= Eitel Cantoni =

Uruguayan racing driver (1906–1997)

- Born: 4 October 1906; Montevideo, Uruguay
- Died: 6 June 1997 (aged 90); Montevideo, Uruguay

Formula One World Championship career
- Nationality: (Uruguay) Uruguayan
- Active years: 1952
- Team: non-works Maserati
- Entries: 3
- Championships: 0
- Wins: 0
- Podiums: 0
- Career points: 0
- Pole positions: 0
- Fastest laps: 0
- First entry: 1952 British Grand Prix
- Last entry: 1952 Italian Grand Prix

Eitel Danilo Cantoni (listed in some sources as Heitel Cantoni; 4 October 1906 – 6 June 1997) was a racing driver from Uruguay. He participated in three World Championship Grands Prix, debuting on 19 July 1952. He was the patron of the Escuderia Bandeirantes outfit, which entered Maserati A6GCM cars for Cantoni and other drivers. He scored no championship points, but also competed in four other Grands Prix during that year, his best finish being seventh at the Modena Grand Prix. Cantoni later competed in South American endurance races.

== Complete World Championship results ==
(key)

Year	Entrant	Chassis	Engine	1	2	3	4	5	6	7	8	WDC	Points
1952	Escuderia Bandeirantes	Maserati A6GCM	Maserati Straight-6	SUI	500	BEL	FRA	GBR; Ret	GER; Ret	NED	ITA; 11	NC	0

=== Non-championship Grand Prix results ===
(key) (Races in bold indicate pole position, races in italics indicate fastest lap)

Year	Entrant	Chassis	Engine	1	2	3	4	5	6	7	8	9	10	11	12	13	14	15	16	17	18	19	20	21	22	23	24	25	26	27	28	29	30	31	32	33	34	35
1952	Escuderia Bandeirantes	Maserati A6GCM	Maserati Straight-6	RIO	SYR	VAL	RIC	LAV	PAU	IBS	MAR	AST	INT	ELÄ	NAP	EIF	PAR	ALB	FRO	ULS	MNZ	LAC	ESS	MAR	SAB; Ret	CAE	DMT	COM; Ret	NAT	BAU	MOD; 7	CAD	SKA	MAD	AVU; 9	JOE	NEW	RIO
