= Charles de Tornaco =

Belgian racing driver (1927–1953)

- De Tornaco during the Albi Grand Prix, 1953
- Born: 7 June 1927; Brussels, Belgium
- Died: 18 September 1953 (aged 26); Modena, Italy

Formula One World Championship career
- Nationality: (Belgium) Belgian
- Active years: 1952–1953
- Team: non-works Ferrari
- Entries: 4 (2 starts)
- Championships: 0
- Wins: 0
- Podiums: 0
- Career points: 0
- Pole positions: 0
- Fastest laps: 0
- First entry: 1952 Belgian Grand Prix
- Last entry: 1953 Belgian Grand Prix

Baron Charles Victor Raymond André Evance de Tornaco (pronounced [ʃaʁl də toʁnako]; 7 June 1927 – 18 September 1953) was a racing driver from Belgium. He participated in 4 Formula One World Championship Grands Prix, debuting on 22 June 1952. He scored no championship points.

De Tornaco was the co-founder of Écurie Belgique, which later became Écurie Francorchamps, and most of his racing career was with this team, driving Ferraris. His father, Baron Raymond de Tornaco (1886-1960), was also a racing driver, competing in endurance events like the inaugural 1923 running of the 24 Hours of Le Mans.

In practice for the 1953 Modena Grand Prix, de Tornaco rolled his car and suffered serious head and neck injuries. There were no adequate medical facilities present, and he died on his way to hospital in a private saloon car.

== Complete Formula One World Championship results ==
(key)

| Year | Entrant | Chassis | Engine | 1 | 2 | 3 | 4 | 5 | 6 | 7 | 8 | 9 | WDC | Points |
|---|---|---|---|---|---|---|---|---|---|---|---|---|---|---|
| 1952 | Ecurie Francorchamps | Ferrari 500 | Ferrari Straight-4 | SUI | 500 | BEL; 7 | FRA | GBR | GER | NED; Ret | ITA; DNQ | | NC | 0 |
| 1953 | Ecurie Francorchamps | Ferrari 500 | Ferrari Straight-4 | ARG | 500 | NED | BEL; DNS | FRA | GBR | GER | SUI | ITA | NC | 0 |

=== Non-Championship Formula One results ===
(key) (Races in bold indicate pole position; Races in italics indicate fastest lap)

| Year | Entrant | Chassis | Engine | 1 | 2 | 3 | 4 | 5 | 6 | 7 | 8 | 9 | 10 | 11 | 12 | 13 | 14 | 15 | 16 | 17 | 18 | 19 | 20 | 21 | 22 | 23 | 24 | 25 | 26 | 27 | 28 | 29 | 30 | 31 | 32 | 33 | 34 | 35 |
|---|---|---|---|---|---|---|---|---|---|---|---|---|---|---|---|---|---|---|---|---|---|---|---|---|---|---|---|---|---|---|---|---|---|---|---|---|---|---|
| 1952 | Charles de Tornaco | Talbot-Lago T26C | Talbot-Lago Straight-6 | RIO | SYR | VAL; NC | RIC | LAV | PAU | IBS | MAR | AST | INT | ELÄ | NAP | EIF | PAR | ALB | | | | | | | | | | | | | | | | | | | | |
| 1952 | Charles de Tornaco | HWM 52 | Alta 2.0 L4 | | | | | | | | | | | | | | | | FRO; 5 | ULS | | | | | | | | | | | | | | | | | | |
| 1952 | Charles de Tornaco | Ferrari 500 | Ferrari 500 2.0 L4 | | | | | | | | | | | | | | | | | | MNZ; Ret | LAC | ESS | 'MAR | SAB | CAE | DMT | COM | NAT | BAU | MOD | CAD; Ret | SKA | MAD | AVU | JOE | NEW | RIO |
| 1953 | Ecurie Francorchamps | Ferrari 500 | Ferrari 500 2.0 L4 | SYR; NC | PAU | LAV | AST | BOR | INT | ELÄ | NAP | ULS | WIN | FRO | COR | EIF | ALB; Ret | PRI | ESS | MID | ROU | CRY | AVU | USF | LAC | BRI | CHE | SAB | NEW | CAD; 5 | RED | SKA | LON | MOD; DNS† | MAD | JOE | CUR | |

| Preceded by Chet Miller | Formula One fatal accidents 18 September 1953 | Succeeded by Onofre Marimón |
