= 1952 Comminges Grand Prix =

Formula Two race

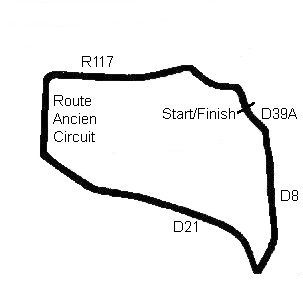

Race details
- Date: 10 August 1952
- Official name: XVI Grand Prix du Comminges
- Location: Saint-Gaudens, Haute-Garonne, France
- Course: Temporary Street Circuit
- Course length: 4.392 km (2.729 mi)
- Distance: 95 laps, 417.24 km (259.26 mi)

Pole position
Driver	(Italy) Alberto Ascari	Ferrari
- Time: 1:51.3

Fastest lap
Driver	(Italy) Alberto Ascari	Ferrari
- Time: 1:51.2

Podium
First	(Italy) Alberto Ascari; (France) André Simon	Ferrari
Second	(Italy) Giuseppe Farina	Ferrari
Third	(France) Jean Behra	Gordini

The XVI Grand Prix du Comminges was a Formula Two motor race held on 10 August 1952 in Saint-Gaudens, Haute-Garonne, France. It was round 7 of Les Grands Prix de France Championship. Race distance was determined by time rather than the number of laps, the result being declared after 3 hours. The win was shared by André Simon and Alberto Ascari in a Ferrari 500; Ascari taking over Simon's car after his own suffered mechanical failure. Ascari had started from pole, and also set fastest lap. Their teammate Giuseppe Farina finished second and Jean Behra in a Simca Gordini Type 15 was third.

== Classification ==
=== Race ===
Pos	No	Driver	Entrant	Car	Time/Retired	Grid
1	12	(France) André Simon (Italy) Alberto Ascari	Scuderia Ferrari	Ferrari 500	95 laps, 138.49 kph	10
2	10	(Italy) Giuseppe Farina	Scuderia Ferrari	Ferrari 500	+1 lap	4
3	4	(France) Jean Behra	Equipe Gordini	Simca Gordini Type 15	+6 laps	5
4	26	(United Kingdom) Graham Whitehead	Peter Whitehead	Alta F2	+6 laps	11
NC	16	(Switzerland) Emmanuel de Graffenried	Scuderia Enrico Platé	Maserati 4CLT/48	+11 laps	15
NC	24	(France) Yves Giraud-Cabantous	HW Motors Ltd.	HWM-Alta	+15 laps	13
Ret	20	(United Kingdom) Lance Macklin	HW Motors Ltd.	HWM-Alta	69 laps, magneto	12
Ret	38	(United States) Harry Schell	Equipe Gordini	Simca Gordini Type 15	68 laps, valve	16
Ret	6	(France) Maurice Trintignant	Equipe Gordini	Gordini Type 16	67 laps, rear axle	2
Ret	34	(Belgium) Johnny Claes	Ecurie Belge	Simca Gordini Type 15	67 laps, gear selector	19
Ret	22	(United Kingdom) Peter Collins	HW Motors Ltd.	HWM-Alta	61 laps, magneto	9
Ret	14	(France) Louis Rosier	Ecurie Rosier	Ferrari 500	56 laps, crash	7
Ret	28	(Brazil) Chico Landi	Escuderia Bandeirantes	Maserati A6GCM	43 laps, split fuel tank	14
Ret	32	(Argentina) Alberto Crespo	Escuderia Bandeirantes	Maserati A6GCM	40 laps, rear axle	8
Ret	30	(Uruguay) Eitel Cantoni	Escuderia Bandeirantes	Maserati A6GCM	39 laps, collapsed wheel	17
Ret	40	(United Kingdom) Archie Bryde	Archie Bryde	Cooper T20-Bristol	28 laps, magneto drive	18
Ret	2	(France) Robert Manzon	Equipe Gordini	Gordini Type 16	16 laps, valve	3
Ret	8	(Italy) Alberto Ascari	Scuderia Ferrari	Ferrari 500	2 laps, steering	1
DSQ	36	(France) Élie Bayol	Élie Bayol	O.S.C.A. Tipo 20	starting outside pits	6
DNA	12	(Italy) Luigi Villoresi	Scuderia Ferrari	Ferrari 500	car driven by André Simon	-
DNA	18	(Italy) Nello Pagani	Scuderia Enrico Platé	Maserati 4CLT/48		-
DNA	40	(United Kingdom) Reg Parnell	Archie Bryde	Cooper T20-Bristol	car driven by Archie Bryde	-

Previous race: 1952 Daily Mail Trophy	Formula One non-championship races 1952 season	Next race: 1952 National Trophy
Previous race: 1949 Comminges Grand Prix	Grand Prix du Comminges	Next race: —
