= 1952 Daily Mail Trophy =

- Non-championship race in the 1952 Formula One season

Race details
- Date: 2 August 1952
- Official name: II Daily Mail Trophy
- Location: Boreham Circuit, Essex, UK
- Course: Airfield circuit
- Course length: 4.828 km (3.000 mi)
- Distance: 67 laps, 323.501 km (201.014 mi)

Pole position
Driver	(Italy) Luigi Villoresi	Ferrari

Fastest lap
Driver	(Italy) Luigi Villoresi	Ferrari
- Time: 1:59.8

Podium
First	(Italy) Luigi Villoresi	Ferrari
Second	(Brazil) Chico Landi	Ferrari
Third	(United Kingdom) Mike Hawthorn	Cooper-Bristol

The 2nd Daily Mail Trophy was a non-championship motor race held for Formula One and Formula Two cars at Boreham Circuit on 2 August 1952. The race was won by Luigi Villoresi in a Ferrari 375, who also set pole and fastest lap. Chico Landi was second in another 375 and Mike Hawthorn was third in a Cooper T20-Bristol, and highest place Formula Two entrant.

After being run for two years in succession, the 3rd Daily Mail Trophy race would not be held until 1984.

== Results ==
Pos	No	Driver	Entrant	Car	Time/Retired	Grid
1	17	(Italy) Luigi Villoresi	Scuderia Ferrari	Ferrari 375	2:25:36.0, 83.11 mph	1
2	29	(Brazil) Chico Landi	Escuderia Bandeirantes	Ferrari 375	+10.0s	3
3	4	(United Kingdom) Mike Hawthorn	Leslie Hawthorn	Cooper T20-Bristol	+1:06.0	6
4	21	(France) Philippe Étancelin	Philippe Étancelin	Talbot-Lago T26C	+1 lap	7
5	18	(France) Louis Rosier	Ecurie Rosier	Ferrari 375	+1 lap	5
6	3	(United Kingdom) Alan Brown	Ecurie Richmond	Cooper T20-Bristol	+1 lap	13
7	1	(United Kingdom) Stirling Moss	English Racing Automobiles	ERA G-Type-Bristol	+1 lap	10
8	10	(United Kingdom) Bobbie Baird	Giovanni Caprara	Ferrari 500	+2 laps	
9	2	(United Kingdom) Eric Brandon	Ecurie Richmond	Cooper T20-Bristol	+3 laps	
10	24	(Argentina) Alberto Crespo	Antonio Lago	Talbot-Lago T26C	+4 laps	12
11	16	(United Kingdom) Peter Whitehead	P. Whitehead	Ferrari 125	+4 laps	
12	20	(France) Yves Giraud-Cabantous	Yves Giraud-Cabantous	Talbot-Lago T26C	+5 laps	9
13	8	(United Kingdom) Ninian Sanderson	Ecurie Ecosse	Cooper T20-Bristol	+5 laps	
14	27	(Republic of Ireland) Joe Kelly	Joe Kelly	Alta GP	+5 laps	
15	7	(United Kingdom) Dennis Poore	Connaught Engineering	Connaught Type A-Lea Francis	+5 laps	8
16	26	(United Kingdom) Ken Wharton	British Racing Motors	BRM P15	61 laps, gearbox	4
17	11	(Italy) Franco Cortese	Scuderia Ambrosiana	Ferrari 166 S	+6 laps	
18	15	(United Kingdom) Ken Downing	Connaught Engineering	Connaught Type A-Lea Francis	+7 laps	11
19	9	(United Kingdom) Bill Dobson	Scuderia Ambrosiana	Ferrari 125	+7 laps	16
20	19	(France) Eugene Chaboud	Ecurie Rosier	Talbot-Lago T26C	+7 laps	15
NC	33	(United Kingdom) Spen King	Gerry Dunham	Rover 75	+8 laps	
NC	14	(United Kingdom) Archie Bryde	A. Bryde	Cooper T20-Bristol	+8 laps	
Ret	37	(United Kingdom) Oliver Simpson	R. York	Alta F2	52 laps	
Ret	28	(France) Pierre Levegh	Antonio Lago	Talbot-Lago T26C	41 laps	
Ret	36	(United Kingdom) Ron Willis	Antonio Lago	BMW-Bristol	37 laps	14
Ret	5	(France) André Loens	Fraser-Hartwell Syndicate	Cooper T20-Bristol	30 laps, mechanical	
Ret	32	(United Kingdom) John James	John James	Maserati 4CLT/48		
Ret	31	(United Kingdom) Gerry Dunham	Gerry Dunham	Alvis		
Ret	38	(United Kingdom) Horace Richards	H.A. Richards	H.A.R.-Riley		
Ret	35	(United States) Harry Schell	Scuderia Enrico Platé	Maserati 4CLT/48		
Ret	34	(Switzerland) Emmanuel de Graffenried	Scuderia Enrico Platé	Maserati 4CLT/48		
Ret	39	(United Kingdom) Roy Salvadori	Giovanni Caprara	Ferrari 166	21 laps	
Ret	12	(United Kingdom) John Barber	John Barber	Cooper T20-Bristol	15 laps	
Ret	22	(United Kingdom) Graham Whitehead	Graham Whitehead	ERA B-Type	7 laps	
Ret	25	(Argentina) José Froilán González	British Racing Motors	BRM P15	3 laps, crash	2
DNA	6	(United Kingdom) Tony Crook	Tony Crook	Frazer Nash Le Mans Replica		
DNA	23	(United Kingdom) David Griffin	Bobby Baird	Baird-Griffin-Maserati		
DNA	30	(United Kingdom) Oscar Moore	Oscar B. Moore	HWM-Jaguar		

Previous race: 1952 Caen Grand Prix	Formula One non-championship races 1952 season	Next race: 1952 Comminges Grand Prix
Previous race: 1951 Daily Mail Trophy	Daily Mail Trophy	Next race: 1984 Daily Mail Trophy
