= 1952 Baule Grand Prix =

Formula Two race

1952 La Baule Grand Prix

Race details
- Date: 24 August 1952
- Official name: XI Grand Prix de La Baule
- Location: La Baule-Escoublac, Loire-Atlantique, France
- Course: Temporary Street Circuit
- Course length: 4.264 km (2.650 mi)
- Distance: 87 laps, 371.034 km (230.550 mi)

Pole position
Driver	(Italy) Alberto Ascari	Ferrari
- Time: 1:57.5

Fastest lap
Driver	(Italy) Luigi Villoresi	Ferrari
- Time: 2:01.1

Podium
First	(Italy) Alberto Ascari	Ferrari
Second	(Italy) Luigi Villoresi	Ferrari
Third	(France) Louis Rosier	Ferrari

The 11th Grand Prix de La Baule was a Formula Two motor race held on 24 August 1952 in La Baule-Escoublac, France. It was round 8, and the final round, of Les Grands Prix de France Championship. Race distance was determined by time rather than the number of laps, the result being declared after 3 hours. The race was won from pole position by Alberto Ascari in a Ferrari 500. Ascari's teammate Luigi Villoresi finished second and set fastest lap, and Louis Rosier in his privateer 500 was third.

== Background ==
=== Race history ===
The Grand Prix of La Baule was a Grand Prix event organized 10 times in La Baule-Escoublac between 1924 and 1952. William Grover-Williams won the event three consecutive years, from 1931 to 1933. Originally raced on the famed beach at La Baule, the 1952 event was moved near the aerodrome of the French coastal town.

== Classification ==
=== Qualifying classification ===
Pos	No	Driver	Constructor	Time	Gap
1	8	(Italy) Alberto Ascari	Scuderia Ferrari	1:57.5	—
2	2	(France) Robert Manzon	Gordini	1:58.5	+1.0
3	12	(Italy) Nino Farina	Ferrari	1:58.9	+1.4
4	10	(Italy) Luigi Villoresi	Scuderia Ferrari	1:59.5	+2.0
5	6	(France) Maurice Trintignant	Gordini	2:02.4	+4.9
6	4	(France) Jean Behra	Gordini	2:02.8	+5.3
7	30	(France) Élie Bayol	O.S.C.A.	2:04.0	+6.5
8	34	(United Kingdom) Eric Brandon	Cooper Car Company	2:05.1	+7.6
9	36	(United Kingdom) Alan Brown	Cooper Car Company	2:06.4	+8.9
10	16	(France) Louis Rosier	Ferrari	2:06.4	+8.9
11	32	(Belgium) Johnny Claes	Simca	2:06.7	+9.2
12	22	(United Kingdom) Lance Macklin	Hersham and Walton Motors	2:07.1	+9.6
13	18	(Switzerland) Emmanuel de Graffenried	Enrico Platé	2:07.3	+9.8
14	14	(United States) Harry Schell	Simca	2:07.9	+10.4
15	20	(Argentina) Alberto Crespo	Platé	2:09.0	+11.5
16	28	(United Kingdom) Peter Whitehead	Alta	2:09.5	+12.0
17	24	(United Kingdom) Peter Collins	Hersham and Walton Motors	2:09.8	+12.3
18	26	(France) Yves Giraud-Cabantous	Hersham and Walton Motors	2:14.2	+16.7
19	38	(France) Jean Lucas	Cooper Car Company	2:17.9	+20.4

=== Race ===
Pos	No	Driver	Entrant	Car	Time/Retired	Grid
1	8	(Italy) Alberto Ascari	Scuderia Ferrari	Ferrari 500	87 laps, 123.49 kph	1
2	10	(Italy) Luigi Villoresi	Scuderia Ferrari	Ferrari 500	+1 lap	4
3	16	(France) Louis Rosier	Ecurie Rosier	Ferrari 500	+4 laps	10
4	24	(United Kingdom) Peter Collins	HW Motors Ltd.	HWM-Alta	+5 laps	17
5	26	(France) Yves Giraud-Cabantous	HW Motors Ltd.	HWM-Alta	+7 laps	18
6	20	(Argentina) Alberto Crespo	Scuderia Enrico Platé	Maserati 4CLT/48	+7 laps	15
7	30	(France) Élie Bayol	Élie Bayol	O.S.C.A. Tipo 20	+8 laps	7
8	32	(Belgium) Johnny Claes	Ecurie Belge	Simca Gordini Type 15	+8 laps	11
NC	34	(United Kingdom) Eric Brandon	Ecurie Richmond	Cooper T20-Bristol	+11 laps	8
NC	36	(United Kingdom) Alan Brown	Ecurie Richmond	Cooper T20-Bristol	+16 laps	9
Ret	4	(France) Jean Behra	Equipe Gordini	Gordini Type 16	58 laps, rear axle	6
Ret	6	(France) Maurice Trintignant	Equipe Gordini	Gordini Type 16	36 laps, rear axle	5
Ret	22	(United Kingdom) Lance Macklin	HW Motors Ltd.	HWM-Alta	33 laps, engine	12
Ret	14	(United States) Harry Schell	Equipe Gordini	Simca Gordini Type 15	29 laps, transmission	14
Ret	18	(Switzerland) Emmanuel de Graffenried	Scuderia Enrico Platé	Maserati 4CLT/48	7 laps, mechanical	13
Ret	2	(France) Robert Manzon	Equipe Gordini	Gordini Type 16	1 lap, crash	2
Ret	12	(Italy) Giuseppe Farina	Scuderia Ferrari	Ferrari 500	1 lap, crash	3
Ret	28	(United Kingdom) Peter Whitehead	Peter Whitehead	Alta F2	1 lap, mechanical	16
Ret	38	(France) Jean Lucas	Archie Bryde	Cooper T20-Bristol	0 laps, mechanical	19

Previous race: 1952 National Trophy	Formula One non-championship races 1952 season	Next race: 1952 Skarpnäcksloppet
Previous race: 1938 Baule Grand Prix	Grand Prix de La Baule	Next race: —
