= 1952 Valentino Grand Prix =

- Non-championship race in the 1952 Formula One season
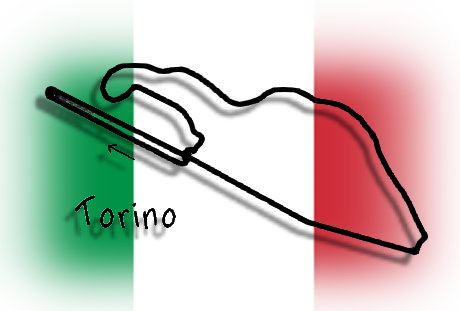

Race details
- Date: 6 April 1952
- Official name: VI Gran Premio del Valentino
- Location: Parco del Valentino, Turin
- Course: Temporary Street Circuit
- Course length: 4.185 km (2.609 miles)
- Distance: 60 laps, 251.10 km (156.54 miles)

Pole position
Driver	(Italy) Giuseppe Farina	Ferrari

Fastest lap
Driver	(Italy) Giuseppe Farina	Ferrari
- Time: 2:01.2

Podium
First	(Italy) Luigi Villoresi	Ferrari
Second	(Italy) Piero Taruffi	Ferrari
Third	(Switzerland) Rudi Fischer	Ferrari

The 6th Gran Premio del Valentino was a non-championship Formula One motor race held on 6 April 1952 at the Parco del Valentino in Turin. The Grand Prix was won by Luigi Villoresi driving a Ferrari 375. Piero Taruffi and Rudi Fischer were second and third in their Ferrari 500s. Giuseppe Farina in another 375 started from pole and set fastest lap but retired after a crash.

== Classification ==
=== Race ===
Pos	No	Driver	Entrant	Car	Time/Retired	Grid
1	24	(Italy) Luigi Villoresi	Scuderia Ferrari	Ferrari 375	2:06:25.3, 119.50kph	3
2	32	(Italy) Piero Taruffi	Scuderia Ferrari	Ferrari 500	+1:09.3	4
3	22	(Switzerland) Rudi Fischer	Ecurie Espadon	Ferrari 500	+2 laps	5
4	8	(United Kingdom) Peter Whitehead	Peter Whitehead	Ferrari 125	+2 laps	6
5	34	(Italy) Alberto Ascari	Scuderia Ferrari	Ferrari 375	+4 laps, fuel tank leak	2
6	28	(Belgium) Johnny Claes	Ecurie Belge	Talbot-Lago T26C	+6 laps	7
NC	12	(Belgium) Charles de Tornaco	Ecurie Francorchamps	Talbot-Lago T26C	+9 laps	11
Ret	20	(Italy) Giuseppe Farina	Scuderia Ferrari	Ferrari 375	31 laps, crash	1
Ret	4	(France) Philippe Étancelin	Philippe Étancelin	Talbot-Lago T26C	16 laps, transmission	8
Ret	30	(Switzerland) Peter Hirt	Ecurie Espadon	Ferrari 212	6 laps, engine	13
Ret	18	(Italy) Adolfo Macchieraldo	Adolfo Macchieraldo	Maserati 4CLT/48	0 laps, crash	9
Ret	16	(Germany) Hans Stuck	Alex von Falkenhausen Motorenbau	AFM-Küchen	0 laps, crash	12
Ret	26	(Italy) Franco Rol	O.S.C.A.	O.S.C.A. 4500G	0 laps	10
DNA	2	(United States) Johnny Parsons	Scuderia Ferrari	Ferrari 375	driver elsewhere	-
DNA	6	(Italy) Felice Bonetto	Enrico Platé	Maserati 4CLT/48		-
DNA	10	(United States) Harry Schell	Enrico Platé	Maserati 4CLT/48		-
DNA	28	(Italy) Luigi Piotti	O.S.C.A.	O.S.C.A. 4500G		-
DNA	36	(United Kingdom) Stirling Moss	BRM	BRM P15	car not ready	-
DNA	38	(Argentina) Juan Manuel Fangio	BRM	BRM P15	car not ready	-
DNA	40	(United Kingdom) Ken Wharton	BRM	BRM P15	car not ready	-

Previous race: 1952 Syracuse Grand Prix	Formula One non-championship races 1952 season	Next race: 1952 Richmond Trophy
Previous race: 1951 Valentino Grand Prix	Valentino Grand Prix	Next race: 1955 Valentino Grand Prix
