= Reif (automobile) =

Formula 2 racing car

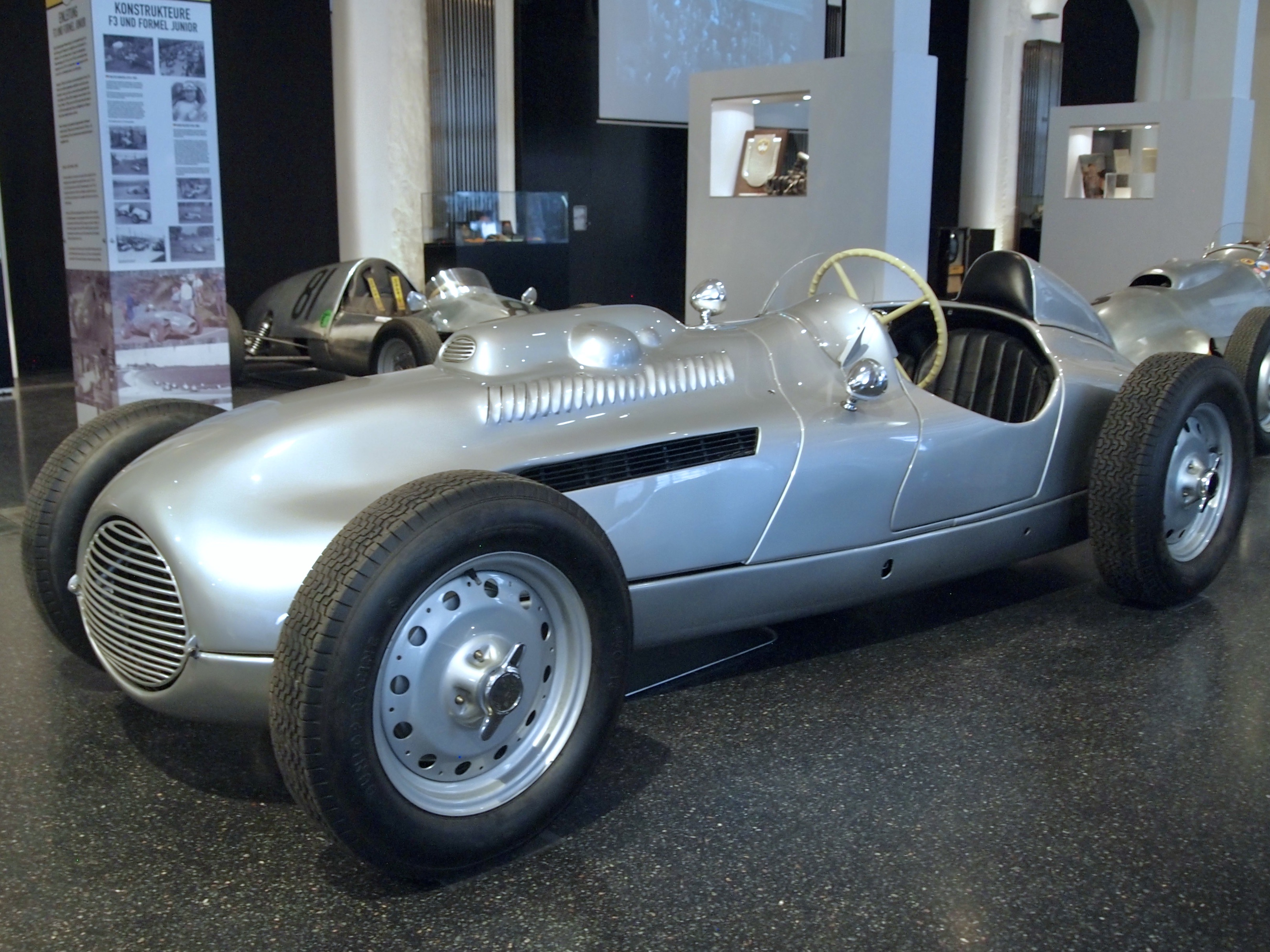
Reif-BMW Formula 2 car, Prototyp Museum, Hamburg

The Reif was a Formula 2 car from East Germany, which raced in the 1952 German Grand Prix.

== History ==
The car was produced by racing driver Rudolf Krause and engineer Erich Reif; it was designed by Eisenach-based BMW specialist Georg Hufnagel, who built the car with fellow specialist Erich Koch. The frame was taken from a 1936 BMW 315/1 and the engine was taken from a BMW 328.

The car made its debut, with Krause at the wheel, on 26 April 1951, in a Formula 2 race at Halle-Saale, and won, also setting fastest lap. Krause competed with the Reif until 1954, including at the 1952 German Grand Prix, when it formed part of the World Championship for Drivers. Krause retired with engine issues on the fourth lap, while lying 14th, having briefly run 10th.

== Complete World Championship results ==
(key)

Year	Chassis	Engines	Tyres	Drivers	1	2	3	4	5	6	7	8
1952	Reif	BMW 328 2.0l L6	E	Rudolf Krause	SUI	500	BEL	FRA	GBR	GER	NED	ITA
1952	Reif	BMW 328 2.0l L6	E	Rudolf Krause						Ret		
