= 1952 Joe Fry Memorial Trophy =

- Non-championship race in the 1952 Formula One season

Race details
- Date: 4 October 1952
- Official name: I Joe Fry Memorial Trophy
- Location: Castle Combe Circuit, Wiltshire, UK
- Course: Airfield circuit
- Course length: 2.961 km (1.840 mi)
- Distance: 20 laps, 59.22 km (36.80 mi)

Pole position
Driver	(United Kingdom) Stirling Moss	ERA
- Time: 1:18.4

Fastest lap
Driver	(United Kingdom) Roy Salvadori	Ferrari
- Time: 1:17.6

Podium
First	(United Kingdom) Roy Salvadori	Ferrari
Second	(United Kingdom) Ken Wharton	Frazer Nash
Third	(United Kingdom) Ninian Sanderson	Cooper-Bristol

The 1st Joe Fry Memorial Trophy was a non-championship Formula Two motor race held at Castle Combe Circuit on 4 October 1952. The race was won by Roy Salvadori in a Ferrari 500, setting fastest lap in the process. Ken Wharton in a Frazer Nash FN48-Bristol was second and Ninian Sanderson third in a Cooper T20-Bristol. Stirling Moss started from pole in an ERA G-Type but retired just after halfway distance.

== Results ==
Pos	No	Driver	Entrant	Car	Time/Retired	Grid
1	65	(United Kingdom) Roy Salvadori	Giovanni Caprara	Ferrari 500	26:32.6, 83.58 mph	3
2	56	(United Kingdom) Ken Wharton	Scuderia Franera	Frazer Nash FN48-Bristol	+11.4s	6
3	63	(United Kingdom) Ninian Sanderson	Ecurie Ecosse	Cooper T20-Bristol	+15.4s	5
4	50	(United Kingdom) Alan Brown	Ecurie Richmond	Cooper T20-Bristol	20 laps	4
5	64	(United Kingdom) Bill Dobson	Ecurie Ecosse	Ferrari 125	+1 lap	10
6	110	(United Kingdom) Lawrence Mitchell	L. Mitchell	Frazer Nash HS-Bristol	+2 laps	12
7	60	(United Kingdom) Ernest Stapleton	E. Stapleton	Aston Martin 15/98	+2 laps	15
8	26	(United Kingdom) Bill Skelly	W. Skelly	Frazer Nash FN56-Bristol	+2 laps	16
Ret	55	(United Kingdom) Kenneth McAlpine	Connaught Racing Syndicate	Connaught Type A-Lea Francis	17 laps	9
Ret	49	(United Kingdom) Eric Brandon	Ecurie Richmond	Cooper T20-Bristol	10 laps	7
Ret	61	(United Kingdom) Stirling Moss	ERA Ltd.	ERA G-Type	6 laps, steering	1
Ret	58	(United Kingdom) Archie Bryde	A. Bryde	Cooper T20-Bristol	5 laps, accident	13
Ret	54	(United Kingdom) Leslie Marr	L. Marr	Connaught Type A-Lea Francis	4 laps, magneto	8
Ret	62	(United Kingdom) Peter Whitehead	P. Whitehead	Alta F2	0 laps, accident	2
DNS	51	(United Kingdom) Oliver Simpson	O. Simpson	Alta F2		11
DNS	70	(United Kingdom) Jimmy Stewart	J. Stewart	Cooper T12-JAP		14
DNA	53	(United Kingdom) Ken Downing	Connaught Racing Syndicate	Connaught Type A-Lea Francis		-
DNA	59	(United Kingdom) Gerry Dunham	G. Dunham	Rover 75		-

Previous race: 1952 Avusrennen	Formula One non-championship races 1952 season	Next race: 1952 Newcastle Journal Trophy
Previous race: —	Joe Fry Memorial Trophy	Next race: 1953 Joe Fry Memorial Trophy
