= 1941 Rio de Janeiro Grand Prix =

Coordinates: 22°59′15″S 43°13′44″W

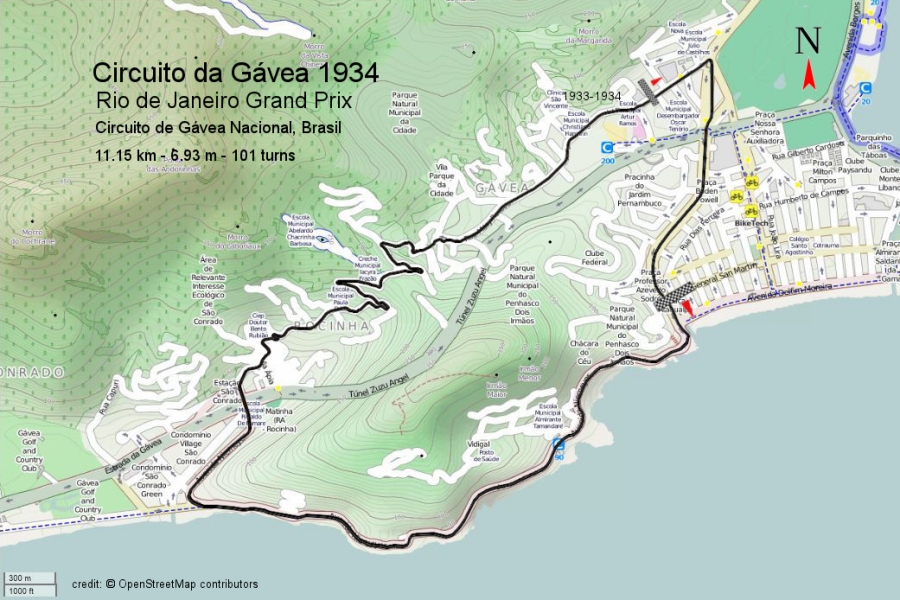
1934 Gavéa street circuit nap

The 1941 Rio de Janeiro Grand Prix was a Formula Libre motor race held at on 28 September 1941 at the Gávea street circuit in Rio de Janeiro, Brazil.

== Classification ==
Pos	Driver	Car	Laps	Time/Retired
1	(Brazil) Chico Landi	Alfa Romeo	20	2:39:51.8
2	(Brazil) Quirino Landi	Maserati	20	+ 4:00.0
3	(Brazil) Manuel de Teffé	Maserati	20	+ 4:59.4
4	(Brazil) Rubem Abrunhosa	Studebaker	20	+ 5:00.1
5	(Brazil) Domingo Lopes	Bugatti	19	+ 1 lap
6	(Brazil) Rodrigo Valentim	Alfa Romeo	19	+ 1 lap
Ret	(Brazil) Oldemar Ramos	Alfa Romeo	18	
