= 1952 National Trophy =

- Non-championship race in the 1952 Formula One season

Race details
- Date: 23 August 1952
- Official name: I National Trophy
- Location: Turnberry, Ayrshire, UK
- Course: Temporary airfield circuit
- Course length: 1.78 mi (2.86 km)
- Distance: 15 laps, 26.70 mi (42.97 km)

Pole position
Driver	(United Kingdom) Mike Hawthorn	Connaught-Lea Francis

Podium
First	(United Kingdom) Mike Hawthorn	Connaught-Lea Francis
Second	(United Kingdom) John Barber	Cooper-Bristol
Third	(United Kingdom) Ninian Sanderson	Cooper-Bristol

The 1st National Trophy was a non-championship Formula Two motor race held at Turnberry on 23 August 1952. The race was won by Mike Hawthorn in a Connaught A Type-Lea Francis, who started from pole. John Barber and Ninian Sanderson were second and third in their Cooper T20-Bristols.

== Results ==
Pos	No	Driver	Entrant	Car	Time/Retired	Grid
1	42	(United Kingdom) Mike Hawthorn	L.D. Hawthorn	Connaught A Type-Lea Francis	20:09.9, 78.80 mph	1
2	41	(United Kingdom) John Barber	J. Barber	Cooper T20-Bristol	15 laps	
3	40	(United Kingdom) Ninian Sanderson	Ecurie Ecosse	Cooper T20-Bristol	15 laps	2
4	39	(Australia) Tony Gaze	T. Gaze	HWM-Alta		
5	25	(United Kingdom) Jack Walton	J. Walton	Frazer Nash LM Replica-Bristol		
6	38	(United Kingdom) Bill Dobson	Scuderia Ambrosiana	Ferrari 125		
Ret	29	(France) André Loens	Fraser-Hartwell Syndicate	Cooper T20-Bristol	14 laps, engine	3
Ret	26	(United Kingdom) John Melvin	J. Melvin	Frazer Nash LM Replica-Bristol		
Ret	31	(United Kingdom) Horace Richards	H.A. Richards	H.A.R.-Riley		
Ret	37	(United Kingdom) Ken Wharton	Scuderia Franera	Frazer Nash FN48-Bristol	6 laps, timing chain	4
Ret	30	(United Kingdom) Bill Skelly	W. Skelly	Frazer Nash FN56-Bristol	0 laps, accident	
Ret	36	(United Kingdom) Dennis Poore	Dennis Poore	Connaught A Type-Lea Francis	0 laps, accident	
Ret	27	(United Kingdom) Joe Little	J. Little	Frazer Nash LM Replica-Bristol		
Ret	28	(United Kingdom) Peter Bolton	P. Bolton	Frazer Nash LM Replica-Bristol		
Ret	32	(United Kingdom) Ernest Stapleton	E. Stapleton	Aston Martin		
Ret	34	(United Kingdom) Ken Downing	K. Downing	Connaught Type A-Lea Francis		
DNA	33	(United Kingdom) Bill Black	W. Black	Connaught Type A-Lea Francis		
DNA	35	(United Kingdom) Kenneth McAlpine	K. McAlpine	Connaught Type A-Lea Francis		
DNA	43	(United Kingdom) Stirling Moss	English Racing Automobiles	ERA G-Type-Bristol		
DNA	40	(United Kingdom) David Murray	Ecurie Ecosse	Cooper T20-Bristol	car driven by Ninian Sanderson	

Previous race: 1952 Comminges Grand Prix	Formula One non-championship races 1952 season	Next race: 1952 Baule Grand Prix
Previous race: —	National Trophy	Next race: 1953 National Trophy
