= 1952 Formula One season =

6th season of FIA's Formula One motor racing

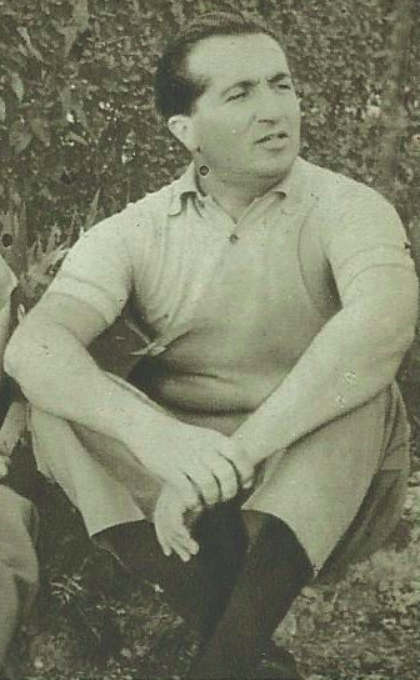
Italian Alberto Ascari won the 1952 World Championship of Drivers, driving for Ferrari.

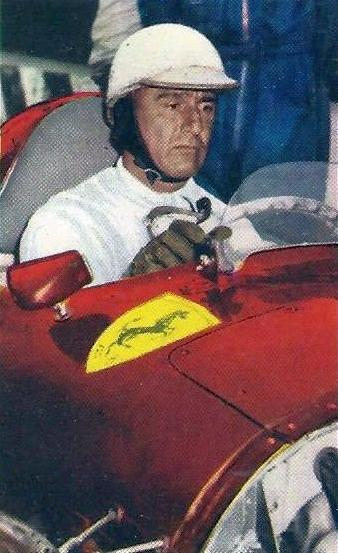
Inaugural 1950 Champion Giuseppe Farina finished runner-up in the World Championship of Drivers.

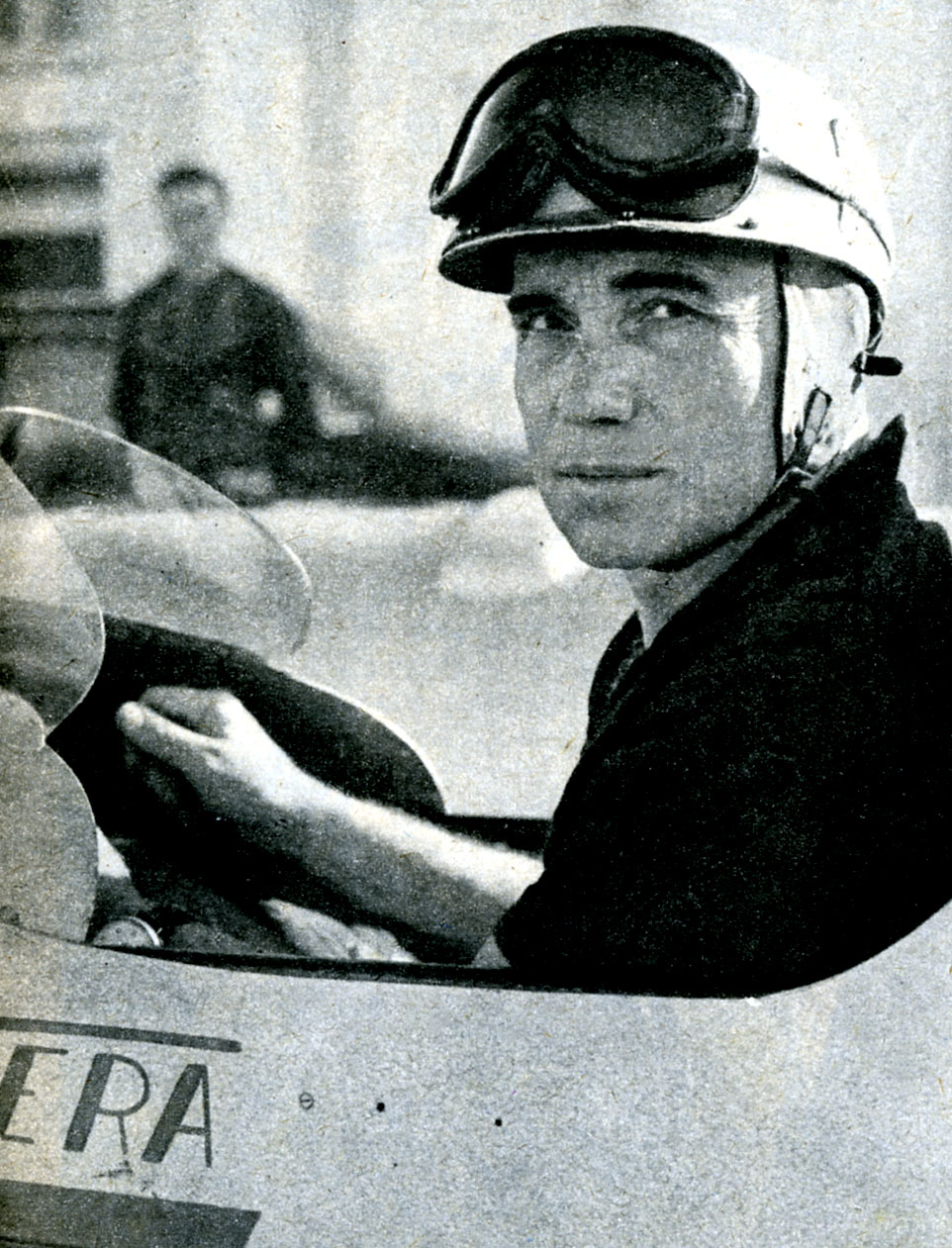
Piero Taruffi finished third in the World Championship of Drivers.

The 1952 Formula One season was the sixth season of FIA Formula One motor racing. The 3rd World Championship of Drivers—contested over eight races between 18 May and 7 September 1952—was to be held under F1 regulations, but the national clubs chose to run their championship events as Formula Two races out of fear for a smaller number of entrants. The Indianapolis 500 continued to be run under the formula dictated by the Contest Board of the American Automobile Association. The season also included several non-championship races for both F1 and F2 cars.

The World Drivers' Championship was won by Alberto Ascari driving for Scuderia Ferrari. The Italian won six out of the seven races he entered.

The 1951 champion Juan Manuel Fangio was unable to defend his title, having been injured in the non-championship Monza Grand Prix early in the season.

Neither British driver nor British constructor won a championship round. This would not happen again until 2023.

== Teams and drivers ==
The following teams and drivers competed in the 1952 FIA World Championship of Drivers. The list does not include those that contested only the Indianapolis 500.

Entrant	Constructor	Chassis	Engine	Tyre	Driver	Rounds
(West Germany) AFM	AFM-Küchen	AFM	Küchen 2.0 V8	E	(West Germany) Hans Stuck	1
(West Germany) Toni Ulmen	Veritas	Meteor	Veritas 2.0 L6	D	(West Germany) Toni Ulmen	1, 6
(France) Équipe Gordini	Gordini	16; 16S; 15	Gordini 20 2.0 L6; Gordini 1500 1.5 L4	E	(France) Jean Behra	1, 3–4, 6–8
(France) Équipe Gordini	Gordini	16; 16S; 15	Gordini 20 2.0 L6; Gordini 1500 1.5 L4	E	(France) Robert Manzon	1, 3–8
(France) Équipe Gordini	Gordini	16; 16S; 15	Gordini 20 2.0 L6; Gordini 1500 1.5 L4	E	(Thailand) Birabongse Bhanudej	1, 3–5
(France) Équipe Gordini	Gordini	16; 16S; 15	Gordini 20 2.0 L6; Gordini 1500 1.5 L4	E	(Belgium) Johnny Claes	3
(France) Équipe Gordini	Gordini	16; 16S; 15	Gordini 20 2.0 L6; Gordini 1500 1.5 L4	E	(France) Maurice Trintignant	4–8
(France) Écurie Rosier	Ferrari	500; 166/F2	Ferrari 500 2.0 L4; Ferrari 166 2.0 V12	D P	(France) Louis Rosier	1, 3–4, 8
(France) Écurie Rosier	Ferrari	500; 166/F2	Ferrari 500 2.0 L4; Ferrari 166 2.0 V12	D P	(France) Maurice Trintignant	1
(United Kingdom) HW Motors	HWM-Alta	52; 51/52	Alta F2 2.0 L4	D	(United Kingdom) George Abecassis	1
(United Kingdom) HW Motors	HWM-Alta	52; 51/52	Alta F2 2.0 L4	D	(United Kingdom) Peter Collins	1, 3–6, 8
(United Kingdom) HW Motors	HWM-Alta	52; 51/52	Alta F2 2.0 L4	D	(United Kingdom) Lance Macklin	1, 3–5, 7–8
(United Kingdom) HW Motors	HWM-Alta	52; 51/52	Alta F2 2.0 L4	D	(United Kingdom) Stirling Moss	1
(United Kingdom) HW Motors	HWM-Alta	52; 51/52	Alta F2 2.0 L4	D	(Belgium) Paul Frère	3, 6
(United Kingdom) HW Motors	HWM-Alta	52; 51/52	Alta F2 2.0 L4	D	(Belgium) Roger Laurent	3
(United Kingdom) HW Motors	HWM-Alta	52; 51/52	Alta F2 2.0 L4	D	(France) Yves Giraud-Cabantous	4
(United Kingdom) HW Motors	HWM-Alta	52; 51/52	Alta F2 2.0 L4	D	(United Kingdom) Duncan Hamilton	5, 7
(United Kingdom) HW Motors	HWM-Alta	52; 51/52	Alta F2 2.0 L4	D	(Belgium) Johnny Claes	6
(United Kingdom) HW Motors	HWM-Alta	52; 51/52	Alta F2 2.0 L4	D	(Netherlands) Dries van der Lof	7
(United Kingdom) Scuderia Franera	Frazer-Nash-Bristol	FN48	Bristol BS1 2.0 L6	D	(United Kingdom) Ken Wharton	1, 3, 7–8
(United Kingdom) Écurie Richmond	Cooper-Bristol	T20	Bristol BS1 2.0 L6	D	(United Kingdom) Eric Brandon	1, 3, 5, 8
(United Kingdom) Écurie Richmond	Cooper-Bristol	T20	Bristol BS1 2.0 L6	D	(United Kingdom) Alan Brown	1, 3, 5, 8
(Italy) Scuderia Ferrari	Ferrari	500; 375S*	Ferrari 500 2.0 L4; Ferrari 375 4.5 V12*	P F	(Italy) Giuseppe Farina	1, 3–8
(Italy) Scuderia Ferrari	Ferrari	500; 375S*	Ferrari 500 2.0 L4; Ferrari 375 4.5 V12*	P F	(Italy) Piero Taruffi	1, 3–6, 8
(Italy) Scuderia Ferrari	Ferrari	500; 375S*	Ferrari 500 2.0 L4; Ferrari 375 4.5 V12*	P F	(France) André Simon	1, 8
(Italy) Scuderia Ferrari	Ferrari	500; 375S*	Ferrari 500 2.0 L4; Ferrari 375 4.5 V12*	P F	(Italy) Alberto Ascari	2–8
(Italy) Scuderia Ferrari	Ferrari	500; 375S*	Ferrari 500 2.0 L4; Ferrari 375 4.5 V12*	P F	(Italy) Luigi Villoresi	7–8
(Switzerland) Enrico Platé	Maserati-Platé	4CLT/48	Platé 2.0 L4	P	(Switzerland) Toulo de Graffenried	1, 4–5, 8
(Switzerland) Enrico Platé	Maserati-Platé	4CLT/48	Platé 2.0 L4	P	(United States) Harry Schell	1, 4–5
(Switzerland) Enrico Platé	Maserati-Platé	4CLT/48	Platé 2.0 L4	P	(Argentina) Alberto Crespo	8
(Switzerland) Écurie Espadon	Ferrari	500; 212	Ferrari 500 2.0 L4; Ferrari 166 2.0 V12	P	(Switzerland) Rudi Fischer	1, 4–6, 8
(Switzerland) Écurie Espadon	Ferrari	500; 212	Ferrari 500 2.0 L4; Ferrari 166 2.0 V12	P	(Switzerland) Peter Hirt	1, 4–5
(Switzerland) Écurie Espadon	Ferrari	500; 212	Ferrari 500 2.0 L4; Ferrari 166 2.0 V12	P	(Switzerland) Rudolf Schoeller	6
(Switzerland) Écurie Espadon	Ferrari	500; 212	Ferrari 500 2.0 L4; Ferrari 166 2.0 V12	P	(West Germany) Hans Stuck	8
(Switzerland) Alfred Dattner	Simca-Gordini	11	Gordini 1500 1.5 L4	E	(Switzerland) Max de Terra	1
(United Kingdom) Leslie D. Hawthorn	Cooper-Bristol	T20	Bristol BS1 2.0 L6	D	(United Kingdom) Mike Hawthorn	3, 5, 7–8
(United Kingdom) English Racing Automobiles Ltd	ERA-Bristol	G	Bristol BS1 2.0 L6	D	(United Kingdom) Stirling Moss	3, 5, 7
(Belgium) Écurie Francorchamps	Ferrari	500	Ferrari 500 2.0 L4	E	(Belgium) Charles de Tornaco	3, 7–8
(Belgium) Écurie Francorchamps	Ferrari	500	Ferrari 500 2.0 L4	E	(Belgium) Roger Laurent	6
(Belgium) Arthur Legat	Veritas	Meteor	Veritas 2.0 L6	E	(Belgium) Arthur Legat	3
(United Kingdom) Robin Montgomerie-Charrington	Aston-Butterworth	NB42	Butterworth 2.0 F4	D	(United Kingdom) Robin Montgomerie-Charrington	3
(Australia) Tony Gaze	HWM-Alta	52	Alta F2 2.0 L4	D	(Australia) Tony Gaze	3, 5–6, 8
(United States) Robert O'Brien	Simca-Gordini	15	Gordini 1500 1.5 L4	E	(United States) Robert O'Brien	3
(United Kingdom) Peter Whitehead	Alta Ferrari	F2; 125/F2	Alta F2 2.0 L4; Ferrari 166 2.0 V12	D	(United Kingdom) Peter Whitehead	4–5, 8
(United Kingdom) Peter Whitehead	Alta Ferrari	F2; 125/F2	Alta F2 2.0 L4; Ferrari 166 2.0 V12	D	(United Kingdom) Graham Whitehead	5
(Brazil) Escuderia Bandeirantes	Maserati	A6GCM	Maserati A6 2.0 L6	P	(France) Philippe Étancelin	4
(Brazil) Escuderia Bandeirantes	Maserati	A6GCM	Maserati A6 2.0 L6	P	(Brazil) Gino Bianco	5–8
(Brazil) Escuderia Bandeirantes	Maserati	A6GCM	Maserati A6 2.0 L6	P	(Uruguay) Eitel Cantoni	5–6, 8
(Brazil) Escuderia Bandeirantes	Maserati	A6GCM	Maserati A6 2.0 L6	P	(Brazil) Chico Landi	7–8
(Brazil) Escuderia Bandeirantes	Maserati	A6GCM	Maserati A6 2.0 L6	P	(Netherlands) Jan Flinterman	7
(Belgium) Écurie Belge	Simca-Gordini	15	Gordini 1500 1.5 L4	E	(Belgium) Johnny Claes	4–5
(Belgium) Écurie Belge	Simca-Gordini	15	Gordini 1500 1.5 L4	E	(Belgium) Paul Frère	7
(Italy) Scuderia Marzotto	Ferrari	166/F2	Ferrari 166 2.0 V12	P	(Italy) Franco Comotti	4
(Italy) Scuderia Marzotto	Ferrari	166/F2	Ferrari 166 2.0 V12	P	(Italy) Piero Carini	4, 6
(United Kingdom) Archie Bryde (United Kingdom) AHM Bryde	Cooper-Bristol	T20	Bristol BS1 2.0 L6	D	(United Kingdom) Mike Hawthorn	4
(United Kingdom) Archie Bryde (United Kingdom) AHM Bryde	Cooper-Bristol	T20	Bristol BS1 2.0 L6	D	(United Kingdom) Reg Parnell	5
(United Kingdom) W. S. Aston	Aston-Butterworth	NB41	Butterworth 2.0 F4	D	(United Kingdom) Bill Aston	5–6, 8
(United Kingdom) Connaught Engineering	Connaught-Lea Francis	A	Lea Francis 2.0 L4	D	(United Kingdom) Kenneth McAlpine	5, 8
(United Kingdom) Connaught Engineering	Connaught-Lea Francis	A	Lea Francis 2.0 L4	D	(United Kingdom) Ken Downing	5
(United Kingdom) Connaught Engineering	Connaught-Lea Francis	A	Lea Francis 2.0 L4	D	(United Kingdom) Eric Thompson	5
(United Kingdom) Connaught Engineering	Connaught-Lea Francis	A	Lea Francis 2.0 L4	D	(United Kingdom) Dennis Poore	5, 8
(United Kingdom) Connaught Engineering	Connaught-Lea Francis	A	Lea Francis 2.0 L4	D	(United Kingdom) Stirling Moss	8
(United Kingdom) Ecurie Ecosse	Cooper-Bristol	T20	Bristol BS1 2.0 L6	D	(United Kingdom) David Murray	5
(Italy) G. Caprara	Ferrari	500	Ferrari 500 2.0 L4	D	(United Kingdom) Roy Salvadori	5
(United Kingdom) Tony Crook	Frazer-Nash-BMW	421	BMW 328 2.0 L6	D	(United Kingdom) Tony Crook	5
(France) Marcel Balsa	Balsa-BMW	Spécial	BMW 328 2.0 L6	E	(France) Marcel Balsa	6
(West Germany) Fritz Riess	Veritas	RS	Veritas 2.0 L6	?	(West Germany) Fritz Riess	6
(West Germany) Theo Helfrich	Veritas	RS	Veritas 2.0 L6	?	(West Germany) Theo Helfrich	6
(West Germany) Willi Heeks	AFM-BMW	8	BMW 328 2.0 L6	?	(West Germany) Willi Heeks	6
(West Germany) Helmut Niedermayr	AFM-BMW	6	BMW 328 2.0 L6	?	(West Germany) Helmut Niedermayr	6
(West Germany) Adolf Brudes	Veritas	RS	Veritas 2.0 L6	?	(West Germany) Adolf Brudes	6
(West Germany) Motor Presse Verlag	Veritas	Meteor	Veritas 2.0 L6	?	(West Germany) Paul Pietsch	6
(West Germany) Hans Klenk	Veritas	Meteor	Veritas 2.0 L6	?	(West Germany) Hans Klenk	6
(West Germany) Josef Peters	Veritas	RS	Veritas 2.0 L6	?	(West Germany) Josef Peters	6
(West Germany) "Bernhard Nacke"	Nacke-BMW	HH48	BMW 328 2.0 L6	?	(West Germany) Günther Bechem	6
(West Germany) Ludwig Fischer	AFM-BMW	8	BMW 328 2.0 L6	?	(West Germany) Ludwig Fischer	6
(West Germany) Willi Krakau	AFM-BMW	6	BMW 328 2.0 L6	?	(West Germany) Willi Krakau	6
(West Germany) Willi Krakau	Krakau-BMW	Eigenbau	BMW 328 2.0 L6	?	(West Germany) Harry Merkel	6
(East Germany) Ernst Klodwig	Heck-BMW	Eigenbau	BMW 328 2.0 L6	?	(East Germany) Ernst Klodwig	6
(East Germany) Rudolf Krause	Reif-BMW	Eigenbau	BMW 328 2.0 L6	?	(East Germany) Rudolf Krause	6
(United Kingdom) Ken Downing	Connaught-Lea Francis	A	Lea Francis 2.0 L4	D	(United Kingdom) Ken Downing	7
(Italy) Officine Alfieri Maserati	Maserati	A6GCM	Maserati A6 2.0 L6	P	(Italy) Felice Bonetto	6, 8
(Italy) Officine Alfieri Maserati	Maserati	A6GCM	Maserati A6 2.0 L6	P	(Italy) Franco Rol	8
(Italy) Officine Alfieri Maserati	Maserati	A6GCM	Maserati A6 2.0 L6	P	(Argentina) José Froilán González	8
(France) Élie Bayol	OSCA	20	OSCA 2000 2.0 L6	P	(France) Élie Bayol	8
(Italy) Piero Dusio	Cisitalia-BPM	D46	BPM 2.0 L4	P	(Italy) Piero Dusio	8
(Belgium) Vicomtesse de Walckiers	Simca-Gordini	15	Gordini 1500 1.5 L4	E	(Belgium) Johnny Claes	8

* Car entered only in the Indianapolis 500 race

=== Team and driver changes ===
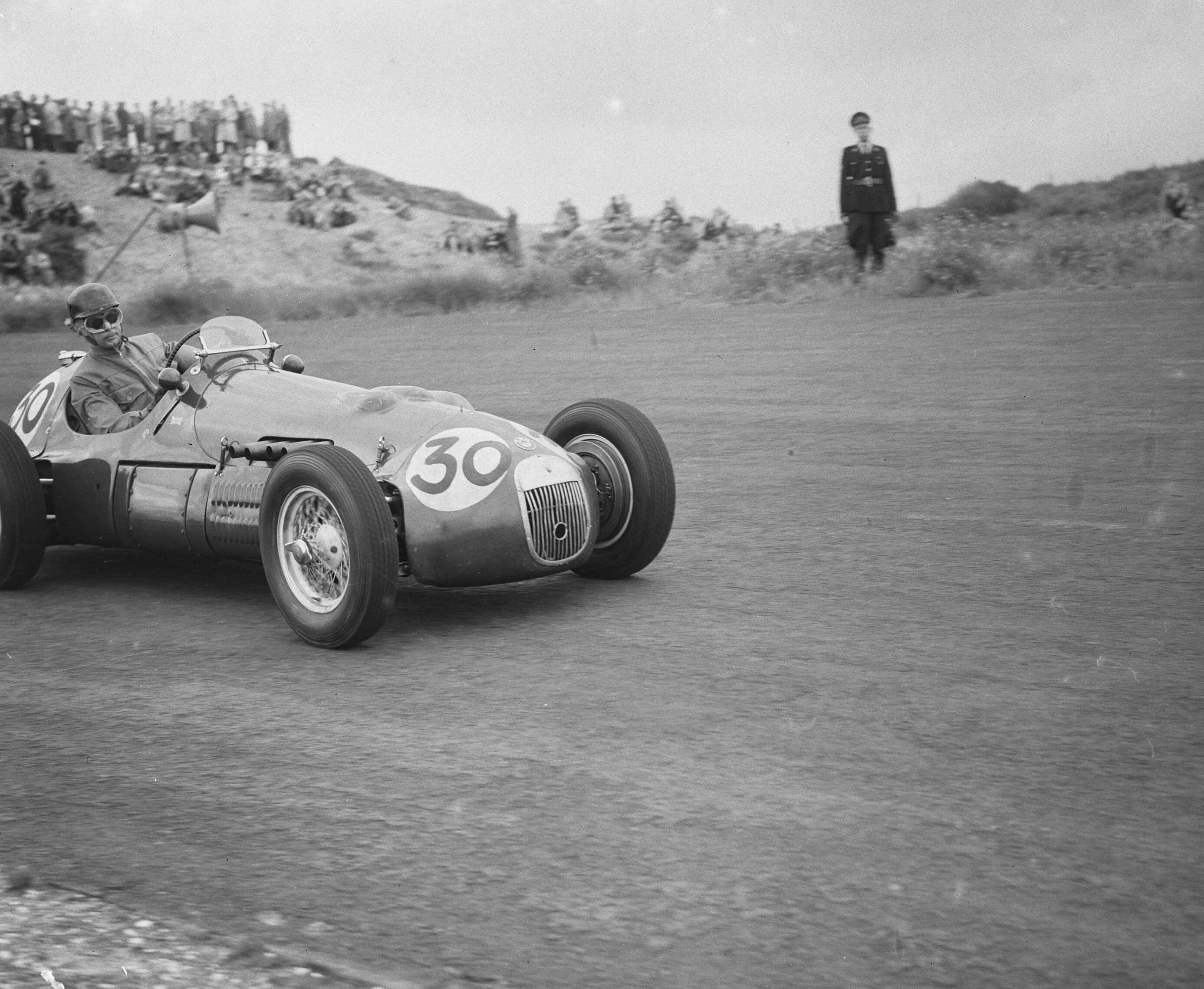
Dutch driver Dries van der Lof in the HWM 52 during the Dutch Grand Prix

- The introduction of Formula Two regulations opened the door for many new constructors (although only a few of them were works teams): AFM, Alta, Aston Butterworth, Connaught, Cooper, Frazer Nash, Veritas and several more German teams who only entered the Nürburgring race.
- Alfa Romeo were unable to fund a new car and withdrew from the sport. Reigning champion Juan Manuel Fangio moved to BRM, while 1950 champion Nino Farina moved to Ferrari.
- BRM were preparing two V16-powered cars for the season, but the project was delayed. Driver Stirling Moss moved to ERA, while Fangio waited until he drove the new BRM in June. He had entered a couple of non-championship races, before he crashed in the race at Monza and suffered a broken neck. After being treated in a Milan hospital, he spent the rest of the year recovering in Argentina.
- After one race in 1951, HWM expanded their operations to enter the full 1952 season. Peter Collins and Lance Macklin were hired full-time, both men making their championship debuts, alongside several part-time drivers.
- Gordini driver André Simon moved to Ferrari, but only entered two championship rounds. The French team welcomed Jean Behra, who had just switched from motorcycle racing, and Thai Prince Bira.
- It took Maserati until the final round of the championship before their new chassis, compliant with the Formula Two regulations, was finished. They hired Felice Bonetto from Alfa Romeo, José Froilán González from Ferrari and Franco Rol, who had previously driven for them in 1950.

== Calendar ==
Round	Grand Prix	Circuit	Date
1	Swiss Grand Prix	(Switzerland) Circuit Bremgarten, Bern	18 May
2	Indianapolis 500	(United States) Indianapolis Motor Speedway, Speedway	30 May (Note: The Indianapolis 500 also counted towards the 1952 AAA Championship Car season, and was run for AAA Championship cars, but was not run to Formula One or Formula Two regulations.)
3	Belgian Grand Prix	(Belgium) Circuit de Spa-Francorchamps, Stavelot	22 June
4	French Grand Prix	(France) Rouen-Les-Essarts, Orival	6 July
5	British Grand Prix	(United Kingdom) Silverstone Circuit, Silverstone	19 July
6	German Grand Prix	(West Germany) Nürburgring, Nürburg	3 August
7	Dutch Grand Prix	(Netherlands) Circuit Zandvoort, Zandvoort	17 August
8	Italian Grand Prix	(Italy) Autodromo Nazionale di Monza, Monza	7 September

=== Calendar changes ===
- The Dutch Grand Prix was included in the championship for the first time.
- The French Grand Prix was moved from Reims-Gueux to Rouen-Les-Essarts for a year.
- The Spanish Grand Prix was scheduled to be held on 26 October but it was cancelled for monetary reasons.

== Regulation changes ==
- Organisers predicted a small number of entrants for the 1952 season, so they decided that all races counting towards the World Championship, except for the Indianapolis 500, would be held for cars complying with Formula Two regulations. This paved the way for a more diverse field of competitors. Maximum allowed engine displacements were halved: Naturally-aspirated engines could be no larger than 2.0 L (down from 4.5) and compressed engines no larger than 750 cc (down from 1.5 L).
- Racing helmets were made mandatory.

== Championship report ==
=== Round 1: Switzerland ===
For the second successive season, the championship's opening round was the Swiss Grand Prix, held at the Bremgarten Circuit in Bern. Ferrari's lead driver Ascari was absent due to his participation in the Indianapolis 500, so it was left to his teammates Nino Farina and Piero Taruffi to secure the first two places on the grid. Farina led from the start until he retired with magneto failure, leaving Taruffi to win his only championship Grand Prix and take the extra point for the fastest lap. Farina took over the car of his other teammate, Andre Simon, and was battling debutant Jean Behra for second place before both experienced mechanical trouble, Farina again unable to continue. It was, therefore, privateer Rudi Fischer who completed a Ferrari 1–2, with Jean Behra in third for Gordini. Ken Wharton finished fourth driving a Frazer-Nash, the manufacturer's only ever points finish.

=== Round 2: Indianapolis 500 ===
As usual, the Indianapolis 500 had little bearing on the championship result, although regular Ferrari driver Alberto Ascari did compete, retiring after 40 laps. The race was dominated by Bill Vukovich, who led 150 laps before retiring. It was left to Troy Ruttman to win the race from Jim Rathmann and Sam Hanks.

=== Round 3: Belgium ===
Ascari returned to Ferrari for round 3 of the championship at Spa-Francorchamps, with Maserati still absent as they developed their A6GCM. The Ferrari cars dominated the weekend, with Ascari taking pole, the race win, and the fastest lap while leading every lap bar one. He was followed home by teammate Nino Farina, and Robert Manzon finished in third for Gordini. Jean Behra again impressed as he led the opening lap before falling behind the Ferrari juggernaut and eventually retiring after an incident with the third Ferrari of Piero Taruffi.

=== Round 4: France ===
Scuderia Ferrari dominated once again at Rouen, taking all three podium places. Ascari led all the way from pole position to assume the championship lead and achieve his fourth career victory, drawing him level with his teammate Nino Farina who finished second. Piero Taruffi finished third after falling behind the Gordinis of Robert Manzon and Jean Behra at the start. Manzon was the highest Non-Ferrari finisher ahead of his teammate Maurice Trintignant, who drove an older model.

=== Round 5: Britain ===
Although Ascari again dominated, it wasn't plain sailing for his teammates as Ferrari eventually dominated as they had done throughout the year. The Italian's third consecutive victory strengthened his eventually successful championship challenge as his main competitor, Nino Farina, failed to score despite taking pole position. The third Ferrari of Piero Taruffi dropped down to ninth at the start but eventually recovered to take second place, while a pitstop for new spark plugs meant Farina finished in the sixth position. It was a triumphant day for British cars and drivers, with Mike Hawthorn taking his first podium driving a Cooper-Bristol, while British cars and drivers occupied the other points-paying positions.

=== Round 6: Germany ===
The belated arrival of the Maserati factory team failed to stop the dominance of Ferrari, with Ascari clinching his first World Title and equalling the injured Juan Manuel Fangio's win record. It was his fourth consecutive victory of the season, again leading every race lap from pole position. He briefly lost the race lead to Farina after pitting for oil, but this is not reflected in the lap charts as he caught and passed his teammate before they crossed the line at the end of the lap. Farina finished second, and privateer Ferrari driver Rudi Fischer finished third ahead of the works car of Taruffi to ensure a Ferrari 1-2-3-4. Jean Behra scored the final points for Gordini just ahead of another Ferrari car, this time driven by Roger Laurent.

=== Round 7: Netherlands ===
Ascari started from pole position and led from start to finish, taking the fastest lap as well, winning his fifth consecutive Grand Prix and earning his second consecutive Grand Slam, and the third his season and career. In addition, with his victory, Ascari overtook Fangio as the winningest Formula One Driver, although the Argentinian would eventually reclaim the record at the 1955 Argentine Grand Prix. Further down the order, Giuseppe Farina and Luigi Villoresi, also driving for Ferrari, completed the podium, resulting in an Italian 1-2-3 and a 1-2-3 for the Scuderia. As a result, Ascari extended his championship points total to 36, extending his lead to 12 points over second-placed Farina.

=== Round 8: Italy ===
The 80-lap race was won by Ferrari driver Alberto Ascari after he started from pole position. José Froilán González finished second for the Maserati team and Ascari's teammate Luigi Villoresi came in third.

== Results and standings ==
=== Grands Prix ===
Round	Grand Prix	Pole position	Fastest lap	Winning driver	Winning constructor	Tyre	Report
1	(Switzerland) Swiss Grand Prix	(Italy) Giuseppe Farina	(Italy) Piero Taruffi	(Italy) Piero Taruffi	(Italy) Ferrari	P	Report
2	(United States) Indianapolis 500	(United States) Fred Agabashian	(United States) Bill Vukovich	(United States) Troy Ruttman	(United States) Kuzma-Offenhauser	F	Report
3	(Belgium) Belgian Grand Prix	(Italy) Alberto Ascari	(Italy) Alberto Ascari	(Italy) Alberto Ascari	(Italy) Ferrari	P	Report
4	(France) French Grand Prix	(Italy) Alberto Ascari	(Italy) Alberto Ascari	(Italy) Alberto Ascari	(Italy) Ferrari	P	Report
5	(United Kingdom) British Grand Prix	(Italy) Giuseppe Farina	(Italy) Alberto Ascari	(Italy) Alberto Ascari	(Italy) Ferrari	P	Report
6	(West Germany) German Grand Prix	(Italy) Alberto Ascari	(Italy) Alberto Ascari	(Italy) Alberto Ascari	(Italy) Ferrari	P	Report
7	(Netherlands) Dutch Grand Prix	(Italy) Alberto Ascari	(Italy) Alberto Ascari	(Italy) Alberto Ascari	(Italy) Ferrari	P	Report
8	(Italy) Italian Grand Prix	(Italy) Alberto Ascari	(Italy) Alberto Ascari (Argentina) José Froilán González	(Italy) Alberto Ascari	(Italy) Ferrari	P	Report

=== Scoring system ===
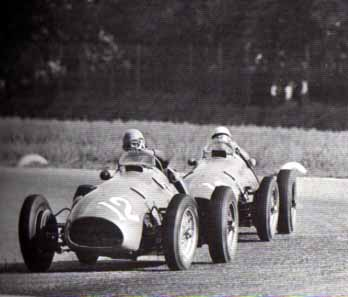
Alberto Ascari won the championship driving a Ferrari 500

Points were awarded to the top five classified finishers, with an additional point awarded for setting the fastest lap, regardless of finishing position or even classification. Only the best four results counted towards the championship. Shared drives result in half points for each driver if they finished in a points-scoring position. If more than one driver set the same fastest lap time, the fastest lap point would be divided equally between the drivers. Points were awarded in the following system:

Position	1st	2nd	3rd	4th	5th	FL
Race	8	6	4	3	2	1

=== World Championship of Drivers standings ===
Pos.	Driver	SUI (Switzerland)	500 (United States)	BEL (Belgium)	FRA (France)	GBR (United Kingdom)	GER (West Germany)	NED (Netherlands)	ITA (Italy)	Pts.
1	(Italy) Alberto Ascari		Ret	1^{P}^{F}	1^{P}^{F}	1^{F}	1^{P}^{F}	(1^{P}^{F})	(1^{P}^{F}*)	36 (53.5)
2	(Italy) Giuseppe Farina	Ret^{P}/ Ret†		2	2	6^{P}	2	2	(4)	24 (27)
3	(Italy) Piero Taruffi	1^{F}		Ret	3	2	4		7	22
4	(Switzerland) Rudi Fischer	2			11†/ DNS	13	3		Ret	10
=	(United Kingdom) Mike Hawthorn			4	Ret	3		4	NC	10
6	(France) Robert Manzon	Ret		3	4	Ret	Ret	5	14	9
7	(United States) Troy Ruttman		1							8
=	(Italy) Luigi Villoresi							3	3	8
9	(Argentina) José Froilán González								2^{F}*	6.5
10	(United States) Jim Rathmann		2							6
=	(France) Jean Behra	3		Ret	7		5	Ret	Ret	6
12	(United States) Sam Hanks		3							4
13	(United Kingdom) Ken Wharton	4		Ret				Ret	9	3
=	(United Kingdom) Dennis Poore					4			12	3
=	(United States) Duane Carter		4							3
16	(United Kingdom) Alan Brown	5		6		22			15	2
=	(France) Maurice Trintignant	DNS			5	Ret	Ret	6	Ret	2
=	(Belgium) Paul Frère			5			Ret	Ret		2
=	(Italy) Felice Bonetto						DSQ		5	2
=	(United States) Art Cross		5							2
=	(United Kingdom) Eric Thompson					5				2
22	(United States) Bill Vukovich		17^{F}							1
—	(Belgium) Roger Laurent			12			6			0
—	(Switzerland) Toulo de Graffenried	6			Ret†	19			DNQ	0
—	(United Kingdom) Peter Collins	Ret		Ret	6	Ret	DNS		DNQ	0
—	(France) André Simon	Ret†							6	0
—	(United States) Jimmy Bryan		6							0
—	(Switzerland) Peter Hirt	7			11†	Ret				0
—	(Belgium) Charles de Tornaco			7				Ret	DNQ	0
—	(United Kingdom) Duncan Hamilton					Ret		7		0
—	(United States) Jimmy Reece		7							0
—	(United Kingdom) Reg Parnell					7				0
—	(West Germany) Fritz Riess						7			0
—	(United Kingdom) Lance Macklin	Ret		11	9	15		8	DNQ	0
—	(United Kingdom) Eric Brandon	8		9		20			13	0
—	(Brazil) Chico Landi							9†	8	0
—	(Belgium) Johnny Claes			8	Ret	14	10		DNQ	0
—	(West Germany) Toni Ulmen	Ret					8			0
—	(United States) George Connor		8							0
—	(France) Philippe Étancelin				8					0
—	(United Kingdom) Roy Salvadori					8				0
—	(United Kingdom) Ken Downing					9		Ret		0
—	(United States) Cliff Griffith		9							0
—	(West Germany) Helmut Niedermayr						9			0
—	(Netherlands) Jan Flinterman							Ret/ 9†		0
—	(Thailand) Birabongse Bhanudej	Ret		10	Ret	11				0
—	(France) Louis Rosier	Ret		Ret	Ret				10	0
—	(United Kingdom) Peter Whitehead				Ret	10			DNQ	0
—	(United States) Johnnie Parsons		10							0
—	(France) Yves Giraud-Cabantous				10					0
—	(Uruguay) Eitel Cantoni					Ret	Ret		11	0
—	(United States) Jack McGrath		11							0
—	(West Germany) Hans Klenk						11			0
—	(United States) Jim Rigsby		12							0
—	(Italy) Franco Comotti				12					0
—	(United Kingdom) Graham Whitehead					12				0
—	(East Germany) Ernst Klodwig						12			0
—	(United States) Joe James		13							0
—	(Belgium) Arthur Legat			13						0
—	(United States) Bill Schindler		14							0
—	(United States) Robert O'Brien			14						0
—	(Australia) Tony Gaze			15		Ret	Ret		DNQ	0
—	(United States) George Fonder		15							0
—	(United Kingdom) Kenneth McAlpine					16			Ret	0
—	(United States) Eddie Johnson		16							0
—	(United States) Harry Schell	Ret			Ret / Ret†	17				0
—	(Brazil) Gino Bianco					18	Ret	Ret	Ret	0
—	(United States) Chuck Stevenson		18							0
—	(United States) Henry Banks		19							0
—	(United States) Manny Ayulo		20							0
—	(United States) Johnny McDowell		21							0
—	(United Kingdom) Tony Crook					21				0
—	(Netherlands) Dries van der Lof							NC		0
—	(United Kingdom) Stirling Moss	Ret		Ret		Ret		Ret	Ret	0
—	(Italy) Piero Carini				Ret		Ret			0
—	(United Kingdom) Bill Aston					DNS	Ret		DNQ	0
—	(West Germany) Hans Stuck	Ret							DNQ	0
—	(United Kingdom) George Abecassis	Ret								0
—	(Switzerland) Max de Terra	Ret								0
—	(United States) Spider Webb		Ret							0
—	(United States) Rodger Ward		Ret							0
—	(United States) Tony Bettenhausen		Ret							0
—	(United States) Duke Nalon		Ret							0
—	(United States) Fred Agabashian		Ret^{P}							0
—	(United States) Bob Sweikert		Ret							0
—	(United States) Gene Hartley		Ret							0
—	(United States) Bob Scott		Ret							0
—	(United States) Chet Miller		Ret							0
—	(United States) Bobby Ball		Ret							0
—	(United States) Andy Linden		Ret							0
—	(United Kingdom) Robin Montgomerie-Charrington			Ret						0
—	(United Kingdom) David Murray					Ret				0
—	(West Germany) Willi Heeks						Ret			0
—	(West Germany) Adolf Brudes						Ret			0
—	(France) Marcel Balsa						Ret			0
—	(West Germany) Günther Bechem						Ret			0
—	(East Germany) Rudolf Krause						Ret			0
—	(Switzerland) Rudolf Schoeller						Ret			0
—	(West Germany) Paul Pietsch						Ret			0
—	(West Germany) Theo Helfrich						Ret			0
—	(West Germany) Josef Peters						Ret			0
—	(Italy) Franco Rol								Ret	0
—	(France) Élie Bayol								Ret	0
—	(West Germany) Willi Krakau						DNS			0
—	(West Germany) Ludwig Fischer						DNS			0
—	(West Germany) Harry Merkel						DNS			0
—	(Argentina) Alberto Crespo								DNQ	0
—	(Italy) Piero Dusio								DNQ	0
Pos.	Driver	SUI (Switzerland)	500 (United States)	BEL (Belgium)	FRA (France)	GBR (United Kingdom)	GER (West Germany)	NED (Netherlands)	ITA (Italy)	Pts.

Key
Colour	Result
Gold	Winner
Silver	Second place
Bronze	Third place
Green	Other points position
Blue	Other classified position
Blue	Not classified, finished (NC)
Purple	Not classified, retired (Ret)
Red	Did not qualify (DNQ)
Black	Disqualified (DSQ)
White	Did not start (DNS)
White	Race cancelled (C)
Blank	Did not practice (DNP)
Blank	Excluded (EX)
Blank	Did not arrive (DNA)
Blank	Withdrawn (WD)
Blank	Did not enter (empty cell)
Annotation	Meaning
P	Pole position
F	Fastest lap

- † Position shared between more drivers of the same car
- * Point for fastest lap shared between different drivers.
- Only the best four results counted towards the championship. Numbers without parentheses are championship points; numbers in parentheses are total points scored.

== Non-championship races ==
Other Formula One/Formula Two races, which did not count towards the World Championship of Drivers, were also held in 1952.

Race name	Circuit	Date	Formula	Winning driver	Constructor	Report
(Brazil) XI Grande Prêmio Cidade do Rio de Janeiro	Gávea	20 January	Formula Libre	(Argentina) José Froilán González	(Italy) Ferrari	Report
(Italy) II Gran Premio di Siracusa	Syracuse	16 March	Formula Two	(Italy) Alberto Ascari	(Italy) Ferrari	Report
(Italy) VI Gran Premio del Valentino	Valentino Park	6 April	Formula One	(Italy) Luigi Villoresi	(Italy) Ferrari	Report
(United Kingdom) IV Richmond Trophy	Goodwood	14 April	Formula One	(Argentina) José Froilán González	(Italy) Ferrari	Report
(United Kingdom) IV Lavant Cup	Goodwood	14 April	Formula Two	(United Kingdom) Mike Hawthorn	(United Kingdom) Cooper-Bristol	Report
(France) XIII Pau Grand Prix	Pau	14 April	Formula Two	(Italy) Alberto Ascari	(Italy) Ferrari	Report
(United Kingdom) I Ibsley Grand Prix	Ibsley	19 April	Formula Two	(United Kingdom) Mike Hawthorn	(United Kingdom) Cooper-Bristol	Report
(France) X Grand Prix de Marseille	Marseille	27 April	Formula Two	(Italy) Alberto Ascari	(Italy) Ferrari	Report
(United Kingdom) I Aston Martin Owners Club Formula 2 Race	Snetterton	3 May	Formula Two	(United Kingdom) Dickie Stoop	(United Kingdom) Frazer Nash-Bristol	Report
(United Kingdom) IV BRDC International Trophy	Silverstone	10 May	Formula Two	(United Kingdom) Lance Macklin	(United Kingdom) HWM-Alta	Report
(Finland) XIV Eläintarhanajot	Eläintarharata	11 May	Formula One	(Belgium) Roger Laurent	(France) Talbot-Lago	Report
(Italy) V Gran Premio di Napoli	Posillipo	11 May	Formula Two	(Italy) Giuseppe Farina	(Italy) Ferrari	Report
(West Germany) XVI Internationales ADAC Eifelrennen	Nürburgring	25 May	Formula Two	(Switzerland) Rudi Fischer	(Italy) Ferrari	Report
(France) VI Grand Prix de Paris	Montlhéry	25 May	Formula Two	(Italy) Piero Taruffi	(Italy) Ferrari	Report
(France) XIV Grand Prix de l'Albigeois	Albi (Les Planques)	1 June	Formula One	(France) Louis Rosier	(Italy) Ferrari	Report
(Belgium) XXII Grand Prix des Frontières	Chimay	1 June	Formula Two	(Belgium) Paul Frère	(United Kingdom) HWM-Alta	Report
(United Kingdom) VI Ulster Trophy	Dundrod	7 June	Formula One	(Italy) Piero Taruffi	(Italy) Ferrari	Report
(Italy) V Gran Premio dell'Autodromo di Monza	Monza	8 June	Formula Two	(Italy) Giuseppe Farina	(Italy) Ferrari	Report
(France) IV Aix les Bains Circuit du Lac	Aix-les-Bains	8 June	Formula Two	(France) Jean Behra	(France) Gordini	Report
(United Kingdom) I West Essex CC Race	Boreham	21 June	Formula Two	(United Kingdom) Reg Parnell	(United Kingdom) Cooper-Bristol	Report
(France) XVI Grand Prix de la Marne	Reims	29 June	Formula Two	(France) Jean Behra	(France) Gordini	Report
(France) II Grand Prix de Sables d'Olonne	Sables	13 July	Formula Two	(Italy) Luigi Villoresi	(Italy) Ferrari	Report
(France) I Grand Prix de Caen	Caen	27 July	Formula Two	(France) Maurice Trintignant	(France) Gordini	Report
(United Kingdom) II Daily Mail Trophy	Boreham	2 August	Formula Two	(Italy) Luigi Villoresi	(Italy) Ferrari	Report
(France) XVI Grand Prix de Comminges	Comminges	10 August	Formula Two	(France) André Simon (Italy) Alberto Ascari	(Italy) Ferrari	Report
(United Kingdom) I National Trophy	Turnberry	23 August	Formula Two	(United Kingdom) Mike Hawthorn	(United Kingdom) Connaught	Report
(France) XI Grand Prix de la Baule	La Baule	24 August	Formula Two	(Italy) Alberto Ascari	(Italy) Ferrari	Report
(Italy) III Gran Premio di Modena	Modena	14 September	Formula Two	(Italy) Luigi Villoresi	(Italy) Ferrari	Report
(France) IV Circuit de Cadours	Cadours	14 September	Formula Two	(France) Louis Rosier	(Italy) Ferrari	Report
(Sweden) II Skarpnäcksloppet	Skarpnäck	14 September	Formula One	(Sweden) Gunnar Carlsson	(United States) Mercury	Report
(United Kingdom) V Madgwick Cup	Goodwood	27 September	Formula Two	(United Kingdom) Ken Downing	(United Kingdom) Connaught	Report
(Germany) VIII Internationales Avusrennen	AVUS	28 September	Formula Two	(Switzerland) Rudi Fischer	(Italy) Ferrari	Report
(United Kingdom) I Joe Fry Memorial Trophy	Castle Combe	4 October	Formula Two	(United Kingdom) Roy Salvadori	(Italy) Ferrari	Report
(United Kingdom) I Newcastle Journal Trophy	Charterhall	11 October	Formula Two	(United Kingdom) Dennis Poore	(United Kingdom) Connaught	Report
(Brazil) XII Grande Prêmio Cidade do Rio de Janeiro	Gávea	14 December	Formula Libre	(Brazil) Henrique Casini	(Italy) Ferrari	Report

=== East German races ===
Note - a blue background denotes a round of the East German Championship.

Race name	Circuit	Date	Winning driver	Constructor	Report
(East Germany) I Rostock Osthafenkurs	Rostock	20 April	(East Germany) Paul Greifzu	(West Germany) BMW-Eigenbau	Report
(East Germany) I Bernau Autobahnschleife	Bernau	4 May	(East Germany) Rudolf Krause	(West Germany) BMW-Reif	Report
(East Germany) I Dessau Autobahnspinne	Dessau	11 May	(West Germany) Fritz Riess	(West Germany) Veritas-Meteor	Report
(East Germany) III Leipzig Stadtparkrennen	Leipzig	2 June	(East Germany) Edgar Barth	(East Germany) IFA-Kollektiv	Report
(East Germany) III Strassen-Rennen Halle-Saale-Schleife	Halle-Saale-Schleife	8 June	(East Germany) Edgar Barth	(East Germany) IFA-Kollektiv	Report
(East Germany) I Strassen-rennen Leipzig	Leipzig	17 August	(West Germany) Hans Stuck	(West Germany) AFM-BMW	Report
(West Germany) V DMV Grenzlandringrennen	Grenzlandring	31 August	(West Germany) Toni Ulmen	(West Germany) Veritas	Report
(East Germany) IV Sachsenringrennen	Sachsenring	7 September	(East Germany) Edgar Barth	(East Germany) EMW-BMW	Report

=== East German Championship ===
The table below shows the points awarded for each race. Only East German drivers were eligible for points.

Place	Driver	Entrant	Car	ROS	LEI	HAL	SAC	Total
1	(East Germany) Edgar Barth	IFA Rennkollektiv	DAMW-BMW 328	3	6	6	6	21
2	(East Germany) Ernst Klodwig	BSG Motor	Heck-BMW 328	2	4		4	10
3	(East Germany) Jürgen Perdus	IFA Renkollektiv	DAMW-BMW 328	4		3		7
4	(East Germany) Paul Greifzu	BSG Motor	Reif-BMW 328	6				6
5	(East Germany) Rudolf Krause	SV Wismut	Reif-BMW 328			4		4
6	(East Germany) Heinz Melkus		ARO-Veritas-Alfa Romeo			2		2
8	(East Germany) Werner Jäger		EMW 340-BMW 328			1		1
