= 1952 Newcastle Journal Trophy =

- Non-championship race in the 1952 Formula One season
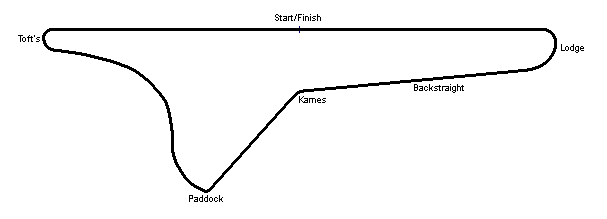

Race details
- Date: 11 October 1952
- Official name: I Newcastle Journal Trophy
- Location: Charterhall, Berwickshire, UK
- Course: Airfield circuit
- Course length: 3.218 km (2.000 mi)
- Distance: 40 laps, 128.72 km (79.98 mi)

Fastest lap
Driver	(Australia) Tony Gaze	HWM-Alta
- Time: 1:26.6

Podium
First	(United Kingdom) Dennis Poore	Connaught-Lea Francis
Second	(United Kingdom) Kenneth McAlpine	Connaught-Lea Francis
Third	(United Kingdom) Mike Oliver	Connaught-Lea Francis

The 1st Newcastle Journal Trophy was a non-championship Formula Two motor race held at Charterhall on 11 October 1952. The race was won by Dennis Poore in a Connaught Type A-Lea Francis, leading home his teammates Kenneth McAlpine and Mike Oliver. Tony Gaze set fastest lap in his HWM-Alta.

Stirling Moss finished fourth in the troublesome ERA G-Type-Bristol; this was the last race entered by the works ERA team.

== Results ==
Pos	No	Driver	Entrant	Car	Time/Retired
1	29	(United Kingdom) Dennis Poore	Connaught Racing Syndicate	Connaught Type A-Lea Francis	59:21.6, 81.14 mph
2	31	(United Kingdom) Kenneth McAlpine	Connaught Racing Syndicate	Connaught Type A-Lea Francis	+34.6s
3	30	(United Kingdom) Mike Oliver	Connaught Racing Syndicate	Connaught Type A-Lea Francis	+41.2s
4	25	(United Kingdom) Stirling Moss	English Racing Automobiles Ltd.	ERA G-Type-Bristol	
5	16	(United Kingdom) Bobbie Baird	Giovanni Caprara	Ferrari 500	
6	32	(France) André Loens	Fraser-Hartwell Syndicate	Cooper T20-Bristol	
7	10	(United Kingdom) Peter Whitehead	P. Whitehead	Alta F2	
Ret	91	(United Kingdom) Alan Brown	A. Brown	Cooper T20-Bristol	timing chain
Ret	82	(Australia) Tony Gaze	T. Gaze	HWM-Alta	
Ret	28	(Belgium) Johnny Claes	Ecurie Belge	Simca Gordini Type 15	broken goggles
Ret	34	(United Kingdom) John Barber	J. Barber	Cooper T20-Bristol	
Ret	35	(United Kingdom) Archie Bryde	A. Bryde	Cooper T20-Bristol	
Ret	38	(United Kingdom) Ninian Sanderson	Ecurie Ecosse	Cooper T20-Bristol	6 laps, transmission
Ret	39	(United Kingdom) Bill Dobson	Scuderia Ambrosiana	Ferrari 125	
Ret	44	(United Kingdom) Horace Richards	H.A. Richards	H.A.R.-Riley	
Ret	45	(United Kingdom) Jack Walton	J. Walton	Frazer Nash Le Mans Replica-Bristol	puncture
Ret	46	(United Kingdom) Peter Bolton	P. Bolton	Frazer Nash Le Mans Replica-Bristol	
Ret	71	(United Kingdom) Albert Wake	A. Wake	HWM-Alta	
Ret	81	(United Kingdom) Ernest Stapleton	E. Stapleton	Aston Martin 15/98	
Ret	83	(United Kingdom) Bill Melville	M.R. Chassels	JP-JAP	
Ret	84	(United Kingdom) Jock White	J. White	MacKay	
Ret	85	(United Kingdom) Eric Brandon	Ecurie Richmond	Cooper T20-Bristol	
Ret	86	(United Kingdom) Joe Little	J. Little	Frazer Nash Le Mans Replica-Bristol	
Ret	87	(United Kingdom) Ken Wharton	Scuderia Franera	Frazer Nash FN48-Bristol	
Ret	89	(United Kingdom) John Melvin	J. Melvin	Frazer Nash Le Mans Replica-Bristol	
Ret	90	(United Kingdom) Peter Scott-Russell	H.A. Mitchell	Frazer Nash High Speed-Bristol	
Ret	116	(United Kingdom) Ian Stewart	J. Brown	HWM-Alta	3 laps
DNS	20	(United Kingdom) Mike Hawthorn	L.M. Hawthorn	Cooper T20-Bristol	

Previous race: 1952 Joe Fry Memorial Trophy	Formula One non-championship races 1952 season	Next race: 1952 Rio de Janeiro Grand Prix
Previous race: —	Newcastle Journal Trophy	Next race: 1953 Newcastle Journal Trophy
