= Gino Bianco =

Brazilian racing driver (1916–1984)

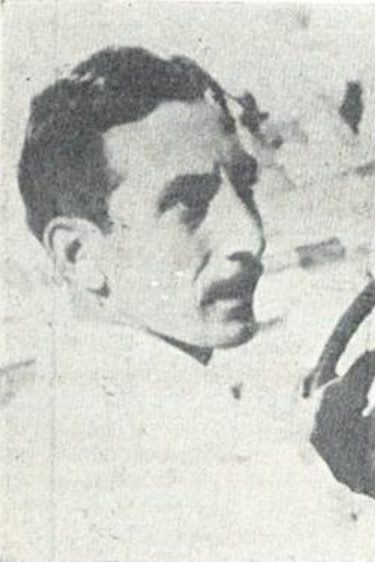
- Bianco in 1949
- Born: 22 July 1916; Milan, Italy
- Died: 8 May 1984 (aged 67); Rio de Janeiro, Brazil

Formula One World Championship career
- Nationality: (Brazil) Brazilian
- Active years: 1952
- Team: non-works Maserati
- Entries: 4
- Championships: 0
- Wins: 0
- Podiums: 0
- Career points: 0
- Pole positions: 0
- Fastest laps: 0
- First entry: 1952 British Grand Prix
- Last entry: 1952 Italian Grand Prix

Luigi Emilio Rodolfo Bertetti Bianco, better known as Gino Bianco (22 July 1916 – 8 May 1984) was a racing driver from Brazil. Born in Milan, Italy, he emigrated to Brazil as a child and started racing there. He raced a Maserati A6GCM for the Escuderia Bandeirantes team and took part in four Formula One World Championship Grands Prix, with a best result of 18th at the 1952 British Grand Prix. Bianco later raced in hillclimbs and died in Rio de Janeiro, aged 67, after suffering from breathing problems.

== Complete Formula One World Championship results ==
(key)

Year	Entrant	Chassis	Engine	1	2	3	4	5	6	7	8	WDC	Points
1952	Escuderia Bandeirantes	Maserati A6GCM	Maserati Straight-6	SUI	500	BEL	FRA	GBR; 18	GER; Ret	NED; Ret	ITA; Ret	NC	0
