= Escuderia Bandeirantes =

- Full name: Escuderia Bandeirantes; Francisco Landi
- Base: Brazil
- Founder(s): Chico Landi
- Noted staff: Chico Landi
- Noted drivers: (Brazil) Gino Bianco (Uruguay) Eitel Cantoni (France) Philippe Étancelin (Netherlands) Jan Flinterman (Brazil) Chico Landi

Formula One World Championship career
- First entry: 1951 Italian Grand Prix
- Races entered: 7
- Drivers' Championships: 0
- Race victories: 0
- Pole positions: 0
- Fastest laps: 0
- Final entry: 1953 Swiss Grand Prix

Escuderia Bandeirantes (English: Team Flag-followers) was a Brazilian motor racing team. It operated as a private entry in Formula One between 1951 and 1953.

== Complete Formula One World Championship results ==
(key) (Results in bold indicate pole position; results in italics indicate fastest lap.)

Year	Entrant	Chassis	Engine(s)	Tyres	Drivers	1	2	3	4	5	6	7	8	9
1951	Francisco Landi	Ferrari 375	Ferrari 375 4.5L V12	P		SUI	500	BEL	FRA	GBR	FRG	ITA	ESP	
1951	Francisco Landi	Ferrari 375	Ferrari 375 4.5L V12	P	(Brazil) Chico Landi							Ret		
1952	Escuderia Bandeirantes	Maserati A6GCM	Maserati A6 2.0L L6	P		SUI	500	BEL	FRA	GBR	FRG	NED	ITA	
1952	Escuderia Bandeirantes	Maserati A6GCM	Maserati A6 2.0L L6	P	(France) Philippe Étancelin				8					
1952	Escuderia Bandeirantes	Maserati A6GCM	Maserati A6 2.0L L6	P	(Brazil) Gino Bianco					18	Ret	Ret	Ret	
1952	Escuderia Bandeirantes	Maserati A6GCM	Maserati A6 2.0L L6	P	(Uruguay) Eitel Cantoni					Ret	Ret		11	
1952	Escuderia Bandeirantes	Maserati A6GCM	Maserati A6 2.0L L6	P	(Brazil) Chico Landi							9^{†}	8	
1952	Escuderia Bandeirantes	Maserati A6GCM	Maserati A6 2.0L L6	P	(Netherlands) Jan Flinterman							9^{†}		
1953	Escuderia Bandeirantes	Maserati A6GCM	Maserati A6 2.0L L6	P		ARG	500	NED	BEL	FRA	GBR	FRG	SUI	ITA
1953	Escuderia Bandeirantes	Maserati A6GCM	Maserati A6 2.0L L6	P	(Brazil) Chico Landi								Ret	

^{†} Indicates shared drive
