= Franco Rol =

Italian racing driver (1908–1977)

- Born: 5 June 1908; Turin, Kingdom of Italy
- Died: 18 June 1977 (aged 69); Rapallo, Genoa, Italy

Formula One World Championship career
- Nationality: (Italy) Italian
- Active years: 1950–1952
- Team(s): Maserati, O.S.C.A.
- Entries: 5
- Championships: 0
- Wins: 0
- Podiums: 0
- Career points: 0
- Pole positions: 0
- Fastest laps: 0
- First entry: 1950 Monaco Grand Prix
- Last entry: 1952 Italian Grand Prix

Franco Rol (5 June 1908 – 18 June 1977) was a racing driver from Italy. He participated in five Formula One World Championship Grands Prix, debuting on 21 May 1950. He scored no championship points. He also participated in many non-championship Formula One events.

== Complete Formula One World Championship results ==
(key)

Year	Entrant	Chassis	Engine	1	2	3	4	5	6	7	8	WDC	Points
1950	Officine Alfieri Maserati	Maserati 4CLT/48	Maserati Straight-4	GBR	MON; Ret	500	SUI; DNA	BEL	FRA; Ret	ITA; Ret		NC	0
1951	O.S.C.A. Automobil	O.S.C.A. 4500G	O.S.C.A. V12	SUI	500	BEL	FRA	GBR	GER	ITA; 9	ESP	NC	0
1952	Officine Alfieri Maserati	Maserati A6GCM	Maserati Straight-6	SUI	500	BEL	FRA	GBR	GER	NED	ITA; Ret	NC	0
