= 1952 West Essex CC Race =

1952 West Essex CC Formula 2 Race
- Non-championship race in the 1952 Formula One season

Race details
- Date: 21 June 1952
- Official name: I West Essex CC Formula 2 Race
- Location: Boreham Circuit, Essex, UK
- Course: Airfield circuit
- Course length: 4.828 km (3.000 mi)
- Distance: 10 laps, 48.28 km (30.00 mi)

Pole position
Driver	(United Kingdom) Ken Downing	Connaught-Lea Francis

Fastest lap
Driver	(United Kingdom) Reg Parnell	Cooper-Bristol
- Time: 1:58.0

Podium
First	(United Kingdom) Reg Parnell	Cooper-Bristol
Second	(United Kingdom) Kenneth McAlpine	Connaught-Lea Francis
Third	(United Kingdom) Bill Dobson	Ferrari

The 1st West Essec CC Formula 2 Race was a non-championship Formula Two motor race held at Boreham Circuit on 21 June 1952. The race was won by Reg Parnell in a Cooper T20-Bristol, who also set fastest lap. Kenneth McAlpine was second in a Connaught Type A-Lea Francis and Bill Dobson was third in a Ferrari 125. Ken Downing in another Connaught Type A started from pole position and finished fourth.

== Results ==
Pos	No	Driver	Entrant	Car	Time/Retired	Grid
1	18	(United Kingdom) Reg Parnell	Archie Bryde	Cooper T20-Bristol	20:05.0, 89.93mph	2
2	10	(United Kingdom) Kenneth McAlpine	Connaught Engineering	Connaught Type A-Lea Francis	+19.0s	3
3	7	(United Kingdom) Bill Dobson	Scuderia Ambrosiana	Ferrari 125	+1:00.4	4
4	11	(United Kingdom) Ken Downing	Connaught Engineering	Connaught Type A-Lea Francis	+1:05.2	1
5	26	(United Kingdom) Charles Bulmer	R.C. Willis	BMW Special	10 laps	6
6	24	(United Kingdom) Dick Jacobs	Sidney Green	Frazer Nash Le Mans Replica	10 laps	7
7	32	(United Kingdom) Cliff Davis	C. Davis	Cooper T14-MG	10 laps	9
8	27	(United Kingdom) Gerry Dunham	G. Dunham	Rover	9 laps, spin/stall	8
9	12	(United Kingdom) Bill Black	Bill Black	Connaught Type A-Lea Francis	9 laps	10
Ret	37	(United Kingdom) John Barber	John Barber	Rebrab-JAP	3 laps, engine	5
Ret	30	(United Kingdom) David Bennett	W. Skelly	Cooper T12-JAP	3 laps, mechanical	11

Previous race: 1952 Circuit du Lac	Formula One non-championship races 1952 season	Next race: 1952 Marne Grand Prix
Previous race: —	West Essex CC Formula 2 Race	Next race: 1953 West Essex CC Formula 2 Race
