= Chico Landi =

Brazilian racing driver (1907–1989)

- Born: Francisco Sacco Landi; 14 July 1907; São Paulo, Brazil
- Died: 7 June 1989 (aged 81); São Paulo, Brazil

Formula One World Championship career
- Nationality: (Brazil) Brazilian
- Active years: 1951–1953, 1956
- Team(s): Maserati inc. as privateer; privateer Ferrari
- Entries: 9 (6 starts)
- Championships: 0
- Wins: 0
- Podiums: 0
- Career points: 1.5
- Pole positions: 0
- Fastest laps: 0
- First entry: 1951 German Grand Prix
- Last entry: 1956 Argentine Grand Prix

Francisco Sacco "Chico" Landi (July 14, 1907 – June 7, 1989) was a racing driver from São Paulo, Brazil. He participated in six Formula One World Championship Grands Prix, debuting on September 16, 1951. He scored a total of 1.5 championship points, awarded for his fourth-place finish in the 1956 Argentine Grand Prix, a drive he shared with Gerino Gerini. He was the first Brazilian ever to take part in a Formula One Grand Prix, and also the first to score points.

== History ==
Landi came from a modest middle-class family of Italian origins, and got into racing through his father, who owned a garage in São Paulo. Along with Manuel de Teffé and Irineu Corrêa, he popularized motor racing in Brazil in the late mid-thirties. Landi had left school at eleven to work as a mechanic, and later began illegal street racing at nights, where he had frequent run-ins with the police. In 1934 he made his racing debut, at the second Rio Grand Prix in 1934. He led until eight laps from the finish, when his engine gave out. He was the most popular Brazilian driver of his time, as many considered Teffé, who was the son of a diplomat of Prussian heritage, a wealthy expat rather than an actual Brazilian, as he had started his racing career while living in Europe. When Corrêa, who ended up winning the 1934 Rio Grand Prix, died in a crash on the first lap of next year, Landi was left as the undisputed master of pre-war racing in Brazil. Landi went abroad in 1938, finishing eighth at Bern in what is generally considered the first Brazilian Grand Prix entry. Landi's first Brazilian GP victory came at the 1941 Rio de Janeiro Grand Prix.

Landi was the first Brazilian driver to win a Grand Prix race, taking a Ferrari to victory at the Bari Grand Prix in 1948, run that year to Formula Two regulations. He also finished second in the 1952 (non-championship) Albi Grand Prix in a Ferrari 375.

Landi also won the 1960 Mil Milhas Brasil in an Alfa Romeo JK 2000, together with Christian "Bino" Heins. This was the first time that a Brazilian-made car won this prestigious race, rather than an American-based "Carretera" special.

== Complete Formula One World Championship results ==
(key)

Year	Entrant	Chassis	Engine	1	2	3	4	5	6	7	8	9	WDC	Points
1951	Francisco Landi	Maserati 4CLT/48	Maserati Straight-4	SUI	500	BEL	FRA	GBR	GER; DNA		ESP; DNA		NC	0
1951	Francisco Landi	Ferrari 375/50	Ferrari V12							ITA; Ret			NC	0
1952	Escuderia Bandeirantes	Maserati A6GCM	Maserati Straight-6	SUI	500	BEL	FRA; DNA	GBR	GER	NED; 9†	ITA; 8		NC	0
1953	Escuderia Bandeirantes	Maserati A6GCM	Maserati Straight-6	ARG	500	NED	BEL	FRA	GBR	GER	SUI; Ret		NC	0
1953	Scuderia Milano	Maserati A6GCM	Maserati Straight-6									ITA; Ret	NC	0
1956	Officine Alfieri Maserati	Maserati 250F	Maserati Straight-6	ARG; 4*	MON	500	BEL	FRA	GBR	GER	ITA		25th	1.5

† Indicates Shared Drive with Jan Flinterman
* Indicates Shared Drive with Gerino Gerini

Sporting positions
Preceded by Catharino Andreatta; Berno Fornari	Winner of the Mil Milhas Brasil; 1960; With: Christian Heins	Succeeded by Italo Bertão; Orlando Menegaz
