= Alberto Crespo =

Argentine racing driver (1920–1991)

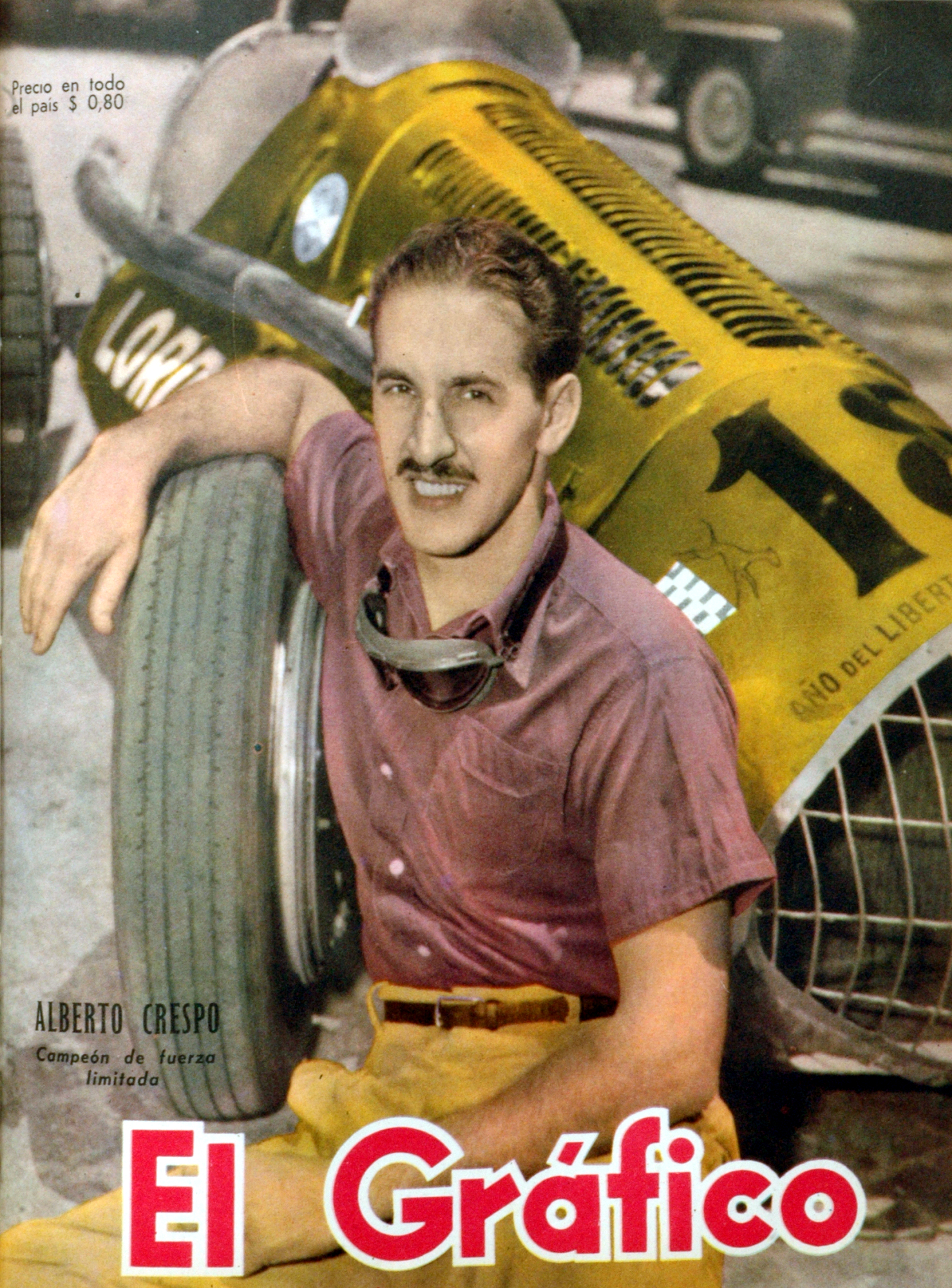
- Born: Alberto Augusto Crespo; 16 January 1920; Buenos Aires, Argentina
- Died: 14 August 1991 (aged 71); Buenos Aires, Argentina

Formula One World Championship career
- Nationality: (Argentina) Argentine
- Active years: 1952
- Team: non-works Maserati
- Entries: 1 (0 starts)
- Championships: 0
- Wins: 0
- Podiums: 0
- Career points: 0
- Pole positions: 0
- Fastest laps: 0
- First entry: 1952 Italian Grand Prix

Alberto Augusto Crespo (16 January 1920 – 14 August 1991) was a racing driver from Buenos Aires, Argentina. He entered one World Championship Formula One Grand Prix, the 1952 Italian Grand Prix, with a Maserati entered for him by Enrico Platé. Crespo posted the 26th best time in the qualifying session of the 35 entrants, although he failed to qualify as only the fastest 24 started the race.

Crespo had previously competed in the 1952 Daily Mail Trophy, in a Talbot-Lago T26C entered by Antonio Lago, in which he qualified 12th and finished 10th. The following year, he competed in the 1953 Buenos Aires Grand Prix in an Alfa-Romeo, and finished 11th.

After his racing career ended, Crespo remained involved with Argentine motorsport administration until his death in 1991.

== Complete Formula One World Championship results ==
(key)

Year	Entrant	Chassis	Engine	1	2	3	4	5	6	7	8	WDC	Points
1952	Enrico Platé	Maserati 4CLT/48	Maserati/Platé Straight-4	SUI	500	BEL	FRA	GBR	GER	NED	ITA; DNQ	NC	0
