= Élie Bayol =

French racing driver (1914–1995)

- Born: 28 February 1914; Marseille, France
- Died: 25 May 1995 (aged 81); La Ciotat, France

Formula One World Championship career
- Nationality: (France) French
- Active years: 1952 – 1956
- Team(s): O.S.C.A., Gordini
- Entries: 8 (7 starts)
- Championships: 0
- Wins: 0
- Podiums: 0
- Career points: 2
- Pole positions: 0
- Fastest laps: 0
- First entry: 1952 Italian Grand Prix
- Last entry: 1956 Monaco Grand Prix

Élie Marcel Bayol (28 February 1914 – 25 May 1995) was a French racing driver who raced in Formula One for the O.S.C.A. and Gordini teams. Bayol also raced sports cars, mostly driving DB-Panhards for the Deutsch Bonnet works team including winning the 750cc class and Index of Performance at the 1954 24 Hours of Le Mans.

== Career ==
=== 1950 ===
Bayol started his career in 1950 racing 500cc DB-Panhards in races and hillclimbs around France. Having previously used Citroën engines, DB found that Panhard were more supportive of their racing endeavours. Panhard decided to take their new 611cc two-cylinder model to the 24 Hours of Le Mans. Bayol shared his car with DB co-founder René Bonnet. On Sunday morning, well in the lead in the Index of Performance category, Bayol's engine broke a conrod. With Bonnet there to instruct him, Bayol was able to repair the engine using tools carried in the car to the extent that he was able to start it and drive with one cylinder to the pits for a full repair. While a great deal of time was lost, they were able to resume and were classified as finishers.

=== 1951 ===
For 1951, Bayol raced DB's Formula 2 car, both he and the car making their debut at the Marseille Grand Prix finishing seventh. He drove the car throughout the year, but as it was based on DB's 500cc car, with an engine of just 750cc, it was greatly underpowered compared with their two-litre Formula 2 opponents, but was fast on very tight and twisty circuits. He also returned to Le Mans with Bonnet, driving the new 850cc car but were outclassed by Porsche in the up to 1100cc class.

=== 1952 ===
For 1952, Bayol ran a modified OSCA MT4 in the Grands Prix de France races with little success, again due to a relatively underpowered 1.3L engine, but performing better at tighter circuits such as at Pau. He returned again to Le Mans in a DB but retired early in the race.

Bayol debuted the new OSCA 20 Formula 2 car (featuring a full-sized two-litre engine) at the Grand Prix du Comminges where he was running third or fourth when his race was ended by issues in the pits. He then went on to make his World Championship debut at the 1952 Italian Grand Prix at Monza where he qualified tenth but retired on the first lap with a gearbox failure. A week later he finished sixth in the Modena Grand Prix, best of the privateers.

=== 1953 ===
Bayol stayed with OSCA for the 1953 season, now joined by veteran Louis Chiron in a second OSCA 20. After a second place for Chiron at Syracuse (a race in which Bayol did not take part), both drivers struggled at Pau (though Bayol was classified in fourth place, a few laps down) and Bordeaux. Bayol qualified on pole at Albi and finished second in his heat, but spun in the final due to a clutch failure.

At Le Mans, Bayol departed from his usual small capacity cars driving one of four 4.5-litre Talbot-Lagos, partnered with Louis Rosier. They retired early in the race with transmission failure.

At his first World Championship race for the year, at the French Grand Prix, Bayol retired with engine trouble. He did however take OSCA's first Formula 2 victory at the Aix-les-Bains Circuit du Lac. Both OSCAs were entered for Switzerland but did not start, and in what would turn out to be OSCA's final World Championship race (as they would instead focus on sports car racing) at the Italian Grand Prix, Bayol retired, while Chiron finished tenth.

=== 1954 ===
With the World Championship races returning to Formula One regulations for 1954, Bayol joined the Gordini team alongside lead driver Jean Behra. Bayol scored his first and only World Championship points with a fifth place at the first race of the season, the Argentine Grand Prix. In the Buenos Aires Grand Prix Formule Libre race he crashed into the crowd on the first lap, killing a spectator and injuring a police officer. Returning to Europe, Bayol finished well at Pau as well as at Bordeaux, but in the Bordeaux race he had been instructed to give his car to Behra, an order he refused, and so he was fired by the team.

At Le Mans, Bayol returned to the DB team, again sharing with Bonnet. In a near perfect race they won the Index of Performance as well as the 750cc class and Biennial Cup, finishing tenth overall. Bayol also drove with Bonnet at the Tourist Trophy in Ulster run under handicap conditions. They were leading the race when Bonnet crashed due to a brake failure, with team-mates Paul Armagnac and Gérard Laureau going on to win in the second DB-Panhard.

=== 1955 ===
As Behra left the Gordini team to drive for Maserati, Bayol was brought back as lead driver for 1955. He drove the aging Gordini 16s in five Formula One races in 1955, including the first two World Championship rounds in Argentina and Monaco, but would retire in all of them. At Le Mans, he was to drive one of the new Gordini T24Ss partnered with Behra. The cars were late to arrive, and in Friday practice as Bayol was pulling into the pits he was clipped by the Mercedes of Stirling Moss, causing him to collide with two journalists and Behra who were standing at the pit counter. Robert Manzon was brought in to replace the injured Behra, Manzon driving a few laps to become familiar with the car. Bayol then went out again and on his second flying lap encountered two spectators crossing the road and swerved to avoid them. This caused him to have a severe crash, destroying the car and leaving him in hospital with a fractured skull and broken vertebrae, ending his season.

=== Later career ===
Bayol stayed with the struggling Gordini team for 1956, without much success, finishing eighth and last in the Glover Trophy at Goodwood and making his only World Championship appearance at Monaco, handing his car over during the race to André Pilette who finished sixth.

== Complete Formula One results ==
(key)

Year	Entrant	Chassis	Engine	1	2	3	4	5	6	7	8	9	WDC	Points
1952	Élie Bayol	O.S.C.A. 20	O.S.C.A. Straight-6	SUI	500	BEL	FRA	GBR	GER	NED	ITA; Ret		NC	0
1953	Élie Bayol	O.S.C.A. 20	O.S.C.A. Straight-6	ARG	500	NED	BEL	FRA; Ret	GBR	GER	SUI; DNS		NC	0
1953	O.S.C.A.	O.S.C.A. 20	O.S.C.A. Straight-6									ITA; Ret	NC	0
1954	Equipe Gordini	Gordini Type 16	Gordini Straight-6	ARG; 5	500	BEL	FRA	GBR	GER	SUI	ITA	ESP	19th	2
1955	Equipe Gordini	Gordini Type 16	Gordini Straight-6	ARG; Ret	MON; Ret	500	BEL	NED	GBR	ITA			NC	0
1956	Gordini	Gordini Type 32	Gordini Straight-8	ARG	MON; 6*	500	BEL	FRA	GBR	GER	ITA		NC	0

* Indicates shared drive with André Pilette
