= 1952 Italian Grand Prix =

← Previous race	Next race →
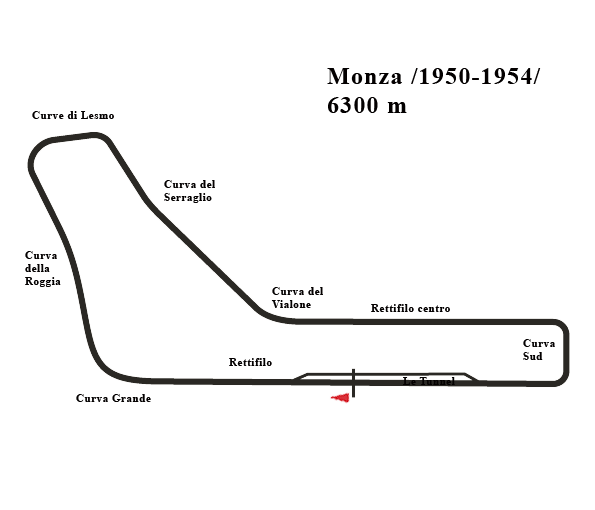

Race details
- Date: 7 September 1952
- Official name: XXIII GRAN PREMIO D'ITALIA
- Location: Autodromo Nazionale di Monza, Monza, Italy
- Course: Permanent racing facility
- Course length: 6.300 km (3.915 miles)
- Distance: 80 laps, 504.000 km (313.171 miles)
- Weather: Sunny

Pole position
Driver	(Italy) Alberto Ascari	Ferrari
- Time: 2:05.7

Fastest lap
Drivers	(Italy) Alberto Ascari (lap 56)	Ferrari
	(Argentina) José Froilán González (lap 57, 60)	Maserati
- Time: 2:06.1

Podium
First	(Italy) Alberto Ascari	Ferrari
Second	(Argentina) José Froilán González	Maserati
Third	(Italy) Luigi Villoresi	Ferrari

The 1952 Italian Grand Prix was a Formula Two race held on 7 September 1952 at Monza. It was the eighth and final round of the 1952 World Championship of Drivers, in which each Grand Prix was run to Formula Two rules rather than the Formula One regulations normally used. The 80-lap race was won by Ferrari driver Alberto Ascari after he started from pole position. José Froilán González finished second for the Maserati team and Ascari's teammate Luigi Villoresi came in third.

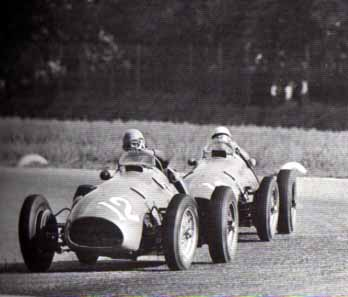
Ferrari's Ascari and Villoresi during the race

== Race report ==
Due to the dominance of the Ferrari team throughout 1952, the World Drivers' Championship had already been clinched a month prior to the season-ending Italian Grand Prix. Nevertheless, Ferrari entered five drivers for their home race, with their Dutch Grand Prix trio—World Champion Alberto Ascari, Nino Farina and Luigi Villoresi—being joined by Piero Taruffi and André Simon, both of whom had competed for the Scuderia at various points of the season. There were also a number of privateer Ferraris, including the Ecurie Espadon pairing of Fischer and Stuck, as well as Charles de Tornaco of Ecurie Francorchamps, Louis Rosier and Peter Whitehead. The works Maserati team appeared for the first and only time in the 1952 World Championship, running three cars for Felice Bonetto, Franco Rol and José Froilán González. Also running A6GCMs were the Escuderia Bandeirantes trio of Bianco, Cantoni and Landi, while Enrico Platé's drivers—Toulo de Graffenried and debutant Alberto Crespo—ran the older 4CLT/48 equipped with the team's own revised engines. Gordini retained their previous driver lineup of Behra, Manzon and Trintignant, while Johnny Claes drove a privateer Simca-Gordini at Monza. HWM entered a pair of cars for Peter Collins and Lance Macklin, with Australian Tony Gaze running a privateer HWM. The Connaught team, absent since the British Grand Prix, returned to the Championship with a three-car entry consisting of Stirling Moss (who had driven for ERA at the previous event), Dennis Poore and Kenneth McAlpine.

For this event, only 24 cars were allowed to take the start, meaning that 11 of the 35 drivers who had entered the race failed to qualify. These included all of the HWMs, three of the privateer Ferraris, and both of the Enrico Platé-entered Maseratis. Ascari took his third consecutive pole position (and his fifth of the season), and the front row was completed by his teammates Villoresi and Farina, and the Gordini of Trintignant. The Maserati of González started from the second row, alongside the remaining works Ferraris of Taruffi and Simon, and the Gordini of Robert Manzon. Row three consisted of Stirling Moss in the leading Connaught, Frenchman Élie Bayol in the sole OSCA, Behra in the third and final works Gordini, and Mike Hawthorn in his privateer Cooper-Bristol. The remaining works Maseratis of Bonetto and Rol were only able to make the fourth row of the grid, starting from 13th and 16th, respectively.

José Froilán González emerged in first place at the start of the race, ahead of Ascari in second. The Argentine remained in the lead for the first 36 laps of the race, until a slow pit stop allowed the Ferraris of Ascari and Villoresi to pass him for first and second, respectively. Ascari held the lead for the remainder of the race, and, in so doing, took his sixth consecutive World Championship race victory. González caught up with Villoresi and passed him to take second place in his only Championship race of the season. Villoresi completed the podium by taking his second consecutive third-place finish. Farina was not far behind in fourth place, while the second Maserati of Felice Bonetto took the final points position in fifth, finishing a lap down on the leaders. The remaining works Ferraris of Simon and Taruffi finished in sixth and seventh place, respectively.

As Taruffi finished outside the points, he was unable to overtake Nino Farina in the Drivers' Championship standings. The Ferrari team monopolised the top three positions, with World Champion Alberto Ascari ahead of teammates Farina and Taruffi.

== Entries ==
No	Driver	Entrant	Constructor	Chassis	Engine	Tyre
2	(France) Robert Manzon	Equipe Gordini	Gordini	Gordini T16	Gordini 20 2.0 L6	E
4	(France) Maurice Trintignant	Equipe Gordini	Gordini	Gordini T16	Gordini 20 2.0 L6	E
6	(France) Jean Behra	Equipe Gordini	Gordini	Gordini T16	Gordini 20 2.0 L6	E
8	(France) André Simon	Scuderia Ferrari	Ferrari	Ferrari 500	Ferrari Type 500 2.0 L4	P
10	(Italy) Nino Farina	Scuderia Ferrari	Ferrari	Ferrari 500	Ferrari Type 500 2.0 L4	P
12	(Italy) Alberto Ascari	Scuderia Ferrari	Ferrari	Ferrari 500	Ferrari Type 500 2.0 L4	P
14	(Italy) Piero Taruffi	Scuderia Ferrari	Ferrari	Ferrari 500	Ferrari Type 500 2.0 L4	P
16	(Italy) Luigi Villoresi	Scuderia Ferrari	Ferrari	Ferrari 500	Ferrari Type 500 2.0 L4	P
18	(Switzerland) Rudi Fischer	Ecurie Espadon	Ferrari	Ferrari 500	Ferrari Type 500 2.0 L4	P
20	(West Germany) Hans Stuck	Ecurie Espadon	Ferrari	Ferrari 212	Ferrari 166 2.0 V12	P
22	(Italy) Felice Bonetto	Officine Alfieri Maserati	Maserati	Maserati A6GCM	Maserati A6G 2.0 L6	P
24	(Italy) Franco Rol	Officine Alfieri Maserati	Maserati	Maserati A6GCM	Maserati A6G 2.0 L6	P
26	(Argentina) José Froilán González	Officine Alfieri Maserati	Maserati	Maserati A6GCM	Maserati A6G 2.0 L6	P
28	(United Kingdom) Kenneth McAlpine	Connaught Engineering	Connaught-Lea Francis	Connaught A	Lea Francis 2.0 L4	D
30	(United Kingdom) Dennis Poore	Connaught Engineering	Connaught-Lea Francis	Connaught A	Lea Francis 2.0 L4	D
32	(United Kingdom) Stirling Moss	Connaught Engineering	Connaught-Lea Francis	Connaught A	Lea Francis 2.0 L4	D
34	(France) Élie Bayol	Élie Bayol	OSCA	OSCA 20	OSCA Tipo 2000 2.0 L6	P
36	(United Kingdom) Eric Brandon	Ecurie Richmond	Cooper-Bristol	Cooper T20	Bristol BS1 2.0 L6	D
38	(United Kingdom) Alan Brown	Ecurie Richmond	Cooper-Bristol	Cooper T20	Bristol BS1 2.0 L6	D
40	(United Kingdom) Ken Wharton	Scuderia Franera	Cooper-Bristol	Cooper T20	Bristol BS1 2.0 L6	D
42	(United Kingdom) Mike Hawthorn	Leslie D. Hawthorn	Cooper-Bristol	Cooper T20	Bristol BS1 2.0 L6	D
44	(Italy) Piero Dusio^{1}	Piero Dusio	Cisitalia-BPM	Cisitalia D46	BPM 2.0 L4	P
46	(Brazil) Gino Bianco	Escuderia Bandeirantes	Maserati	Maserati A6GCM	Maserati A6G 2.0 L6	P
48	(Brazil) Chico Landi^{2}	Escuderia Bandeirantes	Maserati	Maserati A6GCM	Maserati A6G 2.0 L6	P
50	(Uruguay) Eitel Cantoni	Escuderia Bandeirantes	Maserati	Maserati A6GCM	Maserati A6G 2.0 L6	P
52	(United Kingdom) Lance Macklin	HW Motors	HWM-Alta	HWM 52	Alta F2 2.0 L4	D
54	(United Kingdom) Peter Collins	HW Motors	HWM-Alta	HWM 52	Alta F2 2.0 L4	D
56	(Australia) Tony Gaze	Tony Gaze	HWM-Alta	HWM 52	Alta F2 2.0 L4	D
58	(Argentina) Alberto Crespo	Enrico Platé	Maserati-Platé	Maserati 4CLT-48	Platé 2.0 L4	P
60	(Switzerland) Toulo de Graffenried	Enrico Platé	Maserati-Platé	Maserati 4CLT-48	Platé 2.0 L4	P
62	(France) Louis Rosier	Ecurie Rosier	Ferrari	Ferrari 500	Ferrari Type 500 2.0 L4	P
64	(United Kingdom) Bill Aston	W.S. Aston	Aston Butterworth	Aston NB41	Aston Butterworth F4 2.0 F4	D
66	(Belgium) Johnny Claes	Vicomtesse de Walckiers	Simca-Gordini	Simca-Gordini T15	Gordini 1500 1.5 L4	E
68	(United Kingdom) Peter Whitehead	Peter Whitehead	Ferrari	Ferrari 125	Ferrari 166 2.0 V12	D
70	(Belgium) Charles de Tornaco	Ecurie Francorchamps	Ferrari	Ferrari 500	Ferrari Type 500 2.0 L4	E

^1 — Carlo Dusio, named substitute driver for the #44 Cisitalia-BPM, took no part in the Grand Prix.

== Classification ==
=== Qualifying ===
Pos	No	Driver	Constructor	Time	Gap
1	12	(Italy) Alberto Ascari	Ferrari	2:05.7	—
2	16	(Italy) Luigi Villoresi	Ferrari	2:06.6	+0.9
3	10	(Italy) Nino Farina	Ferrari	2:07.0	+1.3
4	4	(France) Maurice Trintignant	Gordini	2:07.2	+1.5
5	26	(Argentina) José Froilán González	Maserati	2:07.6	+1.9
6	14	(Italy) Piero Taruffi	Ferrari	2:07.8	+2.1
7	2	(France) Robert Manzon	Gordini	2:08.2	+2.5
8	8	(France) André Simon	Ferrari	2:09.1	+3.4
9	32	(United Kingdom) Stirling Moss	Connaught-Lea Francis	2:09.8	+4.1
10	34	(France) Élie Bayol	OSCA	2:10.6	+4.9
11	6	(France) Jean Behra	Gordini	2:10.8	+5.1
12	42	(United Kingdom) Mike Hawthorn	Cooper-Bristol	2:11.2	+5.5
13	22	(Italy) Felice Bonetto	Maserati	2:11.6	+5.9
14	18	(Switzerland) Rudi Fischer	Ferrari	2:11.8	+6.1
15	40	(United Kingdom) Ken Wharton	Cooper-Bristol	2:12.2	+6.5
16	24	(Italy) Franco Rol	Maserati	2:12.7	+7.0
17	62	(France) Louis Rosier	Ferrari	2:12.7	+7.0
18	48	(Brazil) Chico Landi	Maserati	2:13.0	+7.3
19	30	(United Kingdom) Dennis Poore	Connaught-Lea Francis	2:14.0	+8.3
20	36	(United Kingdom) Eric Brandon	Cooper-Bristol	2:14.0	+8.3
21	38	(United Kingdom) Alan Brown	Cooper-Bristol	2:15.0	+9.3
22	28	(United Kingdom) Kenneth McAlpine	Connaught-Lea Francis	2:15.1	+9.4
23	50	(Uruguay) Eitel Cantoni	Maserati	2:15.9	+10.2
24	46	(Brazil) Gino Bianco	Maserati	2:17.1	+11.4
25	70	(Belgium) Charles de Tornaco	Ferrari	2:17.5	+11.8
26	58	(Argentina) Alberto Crespo	Maserati-Platé	2:17.8	+12.1
27	60	(Switzerland) Toulo de Graffenried	Maserati-Platé	2:18.4	+12.7
28	54	(United Kingdom) Peter Collins	HWM-Alta	2:18.6	+12.9
29	68	(United Kingdom) Peter Whitehead	Ferrari	2:18.8	+13.1
30	56	(Australia) Tony Gaze	HWM-Alta	2:20.3	+14.6
31	64	(United Kingdom) Bill Aston	Aston Butterworth	2:20.7	+15.0
32	52	(United Kingdom) Lance Macklin	HWM-Alta	2:21.0	+15.3
33	20	(West Germany) Hans Stuck	Ferrari	2:22.8	+17.1
34	44	(Italy) Piero Dusio	Cisitalia-BPM	No time	—
35	66	(Belgium) Johnny Claes	Simca-Gordini-Gordini	No time	—

*Entries with a pink background failed to qualify for the race.

=== Race ===
Pos	No	Driver	Constructor	Laps	Time/Retired	Grid	Points
1	12	(Italy) Alberto Ascari	Ferrari	80	2:50:45.6	1	8.5^{1}
2	26	(Argentina) José Froilán González	Maserati	80	+1:01.8	5	6.5^{1}
3	16	(Italy) Luigi Villoresi	Ferrari	80	+2:04.2	2	4
4	10	(Italy) Nino Farina	Ferrari	80	+2:11.4	3	3
5	22	(Italy) Felice Bonetto	Maserati	79	+1 lap	13	2
6	8	(France) André Simon	Ferrari	79	+1 lap	8	
7	14	(Italy) Piero Taruffi	Ferrari	77	+3 laps	6	
8	48	(Brazil) Chico Landi	Maserati	76	+4 laps	18	
9	40	(United Kingdom) Ken Wharton	Cooper-Bristol	76	+4 laps	15	
10	62	(France) Louis Rosier	Ferrari	75	+5 laps	17	
11	50	(Uruguay) Eitel Cantoni	Maserati	75	+5 laps	23	
12	30	(United Kingdom) Dennis Poore	Connaught-Lea Francis	74	+6 laps	19	
13	36	(United Kingdom) Eric Brandon	Cooper-Bristol	73	+7 laps	20	
14	2	(France) Robert Manzon	Gordini	71	+9 laps	7	
15	38	(United Kingdom) Alan Brown	Cooper-Bristol	68	+12 laps	21	
Ret	32	(United Kingdom) Stirling Moss	Connaught-Lea Francis	60	Engine	9	
Ret	46	(Brazil) Gino Bianco	Maserati	46	Engine	24	
Ret	6	(France) Jean Behra	Gordini	42	Engine	11	
NC	42	(United Kingdom) Mike Hawthorn	Cooper-Bristol	38	Not classified	12	
Ret	24	(Italy) Franco Rol	Maserati	24	Engine	16	
Ret	4	(France) Maurice Trintignant	Gordini	5	Engine	4	
Ret	28	(United Kingdom) Kenneth McAlpine	Connaught-Lea Francis	4	Suspension	22	
Ret	18	(Switzerland) Rudi Fischer	Ferrari	3	Engine	14	
Ret	34	(France) Élie Bayol	OSCA	0	Gearbox	10	
DNQ	70	(Belgium) Charles de Tornaco	Ferrari		Did not qualify	—	
DNQ	58	(Argentina) Alberto Crespo	Maserati-Platé		Did not qualify	—	
DNQ	60	(Switzerland) Toulo de Graffenried	Maserati-Platé		Did not qualify	—	
DNQ	54	(United Kingdom) Peter Collins	HWM-Alta		Did not qualify	—	
DNQ	68	(United Kingdom) Peter Whitehead	Ferrari		Did not qualify	—	
DNQ	56	(Australia) Tony Gaze	HWM-Alta		Did not qualify	—	
DNQ	64	(United Kingdom) Bill Aston	Aston Butterworth		Did not qualify	—	
DNQ	52	(United Kingdom) Lance Macklin	HWM-Alta		Did not qualify	—	
DNQ	20	(West Germany) Hans Stuck	Ferrari		Did not qualify	—	
DNQ	44	(Italy) Piero Dusio	Cisitalia-BPM		Did not qualify	—	
DNQ	66	(Belgium) Johnny Claes	Simca-Gordini-Gordini		Did not qualify	—	

Notes

- ^1 – Includes 0.5 points for shared fastest lap

== Championship standings after the race ==
- **Bold text** indicates the World Champion.

Drivers' Championship standings

Pos	Driver	Points
1	(Italy) **Alberto Ascari**	36 (53.5)
2	(Italy) Nino Farina	24 (27)
3	(Italy) Piero Taruffi	22
4	(Switzerland) Rudi Fischer	10
5	(United Kingdom) Mike Hawthorn	10

- Note: Only the top five positions are included. Only the best 4 results counted towards the Championship. Numbers without parentheses are Championship points; numbers in parentheses are total points scored.

Previous race: 1952 Dutch Grand Prix	FIA Formula One World Championship; 1952 season	Next race: 1953 Argentine Grand Prix
Previous race: 1951 Italian Grand Prix	Italian Grand Prix	Next race: 1953 Italian Grand Prix
