= Ken Downing =

British racing driver (1917–2004)

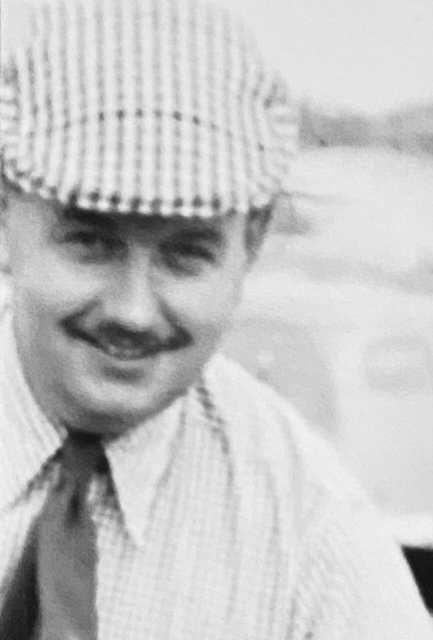
- Born: 5 December 1917; Chesterton, Staffordshire, England
- Died: 3 May 2004 (aged 86); Monte Carlo, Monaco

Formula One World Championship career
- Nationality: (United Kingdom) British
- Active years: 1952
- Team: Connaught (including non-works)
- Entries: 2
- Championships: 0
- Wins: 0
- Podiums: 0
- Career points: 0
- Pole positions: 0
- Fastest laps: 0
- First entry: 1952 British Grand Prix
- Last entry: 1952 Dutch Grand Prix

Kenneth Henry Downing (5 December 1917 – 3 May 2004) was a British racing driver. From a wealthy family connected to G.H. Downing & Co., he began racing as a privateer in the late 1940s, and with Connaught in 1951, winning 17 races throughout the year. He then competed in the 1952 Formula One championship.

Downing switched to single seaters in 1952, racing a Connaught A-Type, and won the Madgwick Cup at Goodwood and second place at the Grand Prix des Frontières at Chimay, where he lost the lead at the end of the race several metres before the finish line. He finished ninth in the British Grand Prix at Silverstone, but had run fourth in the race before spinning while avoiding a backmarker. He competed in the Dutch Grand Prix later that year, but retired from an oil-pressure problem. He switched to an Aston Martin DB3 for 1953, but decided to retire from racing soon after.

Downing emigrated to South Africa in the 1950s and was involved in mining sea diamonds with De Beers. He was later based in Monaco where he died in 2004.

His daughter Anne married Allsport entrepreneur Paddy McNally. His nephews, Ian and David Strickland-Skailes, were also noted racing drivers with the former having entered in the 1970 24 Hours of Le Mans.

== Complete Formula One World Championship results ==
(key)

Year	Entrant	Chassis	Engine	1	2	3	4	5	6	7	8	WDC	Points
1952	Connaught Engineering	Connaught Type A	Lea-Francis	SUI	500	BEL	FRA	GBR; 9	GER	NED	ITA	NC	0
1952	Kenneth Downing	Connaught Type A	Lea-Francis	SUI	500	BEL	FRA	GBR	GER	NED; Ret	ITA	NC	0
