= Dennis Poore =

British racing driver (1916–1987)

- Poore sitting at the wheel of a historic hillclimb car in 1966
- Born: Roger Dennistoun Poore; 19 August 1916; Paddington, London, England
- Died: 12 February 1987 (aged 70); London, England

Formula One World Championship career
- Nationality: (United Kingdom) British
- Active years: 1952
- Team: Connaught
- Entries: 2
- Championships: 0
- Wins: 0
- Podiums: 0
- Career points: 3
- Pole positions: 0
- Fastest laps: 0
- First entry: 1952 British Grand Prix
- Last entry: 1952 Italian Grand Prix

Roger Dennistoun Poore (19 August 1916 – 12 February 1987) was a British racing driver, financier and entrepreneur. He became chairman of Norton Villiers Triumph (NVT) during the final years of the old British motorcycle industry.

== Background and family ==
Poore was born in Paddington, London. His father, Roger Poore, DSO, was killed in action during the First World War on 26 September 1917.

On 24 March 1949, Poore married Peta Farley née Coast. They had one daughter, Victoria Borwick MP.

== Racing career ==
Poore was a keen motor sport participant, and competed in two World Championship Grands Prix in 1952. He made his debut in the British Grand Prix on 19 July 1952, where he finished fourth. He scored three championship points. Poore won the British Hill Climb Championship in 1950 driving a 3.8-litre twin-Wade-blown Alfa Romeo. He finished second at Shelsley Walsh, first at Prescott, second at Bo'ness, taking the win at Rest and Be Thankful, then second at Bouley Bay and first at Val des Terres, rounding off the season with another win at Prescott. After his World Championship Grands Prix, Poore raced sportscars for Aston Martin, winning the Goodwood International Nine Hour race with a DB3S in 1955, co-driven by Peter Walker.

Poore used his personal wealth to bankroll the founding, in 1950, of the motor racing journal Autosport.

== NVT career ==
Poore became chairman of Manganese Bronze Holdings PLC, an engineering company primarily concerned with making marine propellers. Poore later sold off the propeller business and used the funds to buy up a motley collection of failing British motorcycle companies, Associated Motor Cycles, Norton, AJS, James, Francis-Barnett, Matchless, and engine manufacturers Villiers.

Following the collapse of BSA in 1972, the motorcycle interests of Manganese Bronze and BSA/Triumph were merged into Norton Villiers Triumph Ltd. Poore was made chairman of NVT and he quickly sold off BSA's substantial non-motorcycle interests. NVT was assisted by substantial aid from the Government, who were anxious to stave off the collapse of the British motorcycle industry. Poore's restructuring became rather draconian, making 3,000 of the 4,500 workforce redundant. This led to the creation of the Meriden Cooperative which operated for ten years until it became bankrupt. Production of BSA bikes (the A65 twin and the A75 triple) ceased, and with Triumph lost to the Cooperative, the sole NVT model was the Norton Commando. Although this machine won the Motor Cycle News "Bike of the Year" award for several years running, nothing could hide the fact that the Commando was an old design, being a pre-unit pushrod parallel-twin. Eventually Commando production ended and NVT ended up assembling an Asian 125cc trail bike. However, Norton went on to produce a twin-rotor Wankel-engined bike based on David Garside's work at BSA.

Compared with BSA's management team who had led their company to ruin, Poore at first seemed a breath of fresh air who could be the hoped-for saviour of the British motorcycle industry. His sporting past showed he was in tune with motorsport and engineering. However, his reconstruction and redundancy plans were heavy-handed and some regarded him as little more than an asset-stripper.

== London cabs ==
With the purchase of BSA came its subsidiary Carbodies, builder of the FX4 London taxi; the classic "black cab". After disposing of the motorcycle manufacturing arms, Poore continued to head Manganese Bronze as a taxi and component manufacturer until his death in 1987.

== Complete World Drivers' Championship results ==
(key)

| Year | Entrant | Chassis | Engine | 1 | 2 | 3 | 4 | 5 | 6 | 7 | 8 | WDC | Points |
|---|---|---|---|---|---|---|---|---|---|---|---|---|---|
| 1952 | Connaught Engineering | Connaught Type A | Lea-Francis Straight-4 | SUI | 500 | BEL | FRA | GBR; 4 | GER | NED | | 13th | 3 |
| 1952 | Connaught Racing Syndicate | Connaught Type A | Lea-Francis Straight-4 | | | | | | | | ITA; 12 | 13th | 3 |

Sporting positions
| Preceded by Sydney Allard | British Hill Climb Champion; 1950 | Succeeded by Ken Wharton |
