= Eric Brandon =

British racing driver (1920–1982)

- Born: 18 July 1920; East Ham, Essex, England, UK
- Died: 8 August 1982 (aged 62); Gosport, Hampshire, England, UK

Formula One World Championship career
- Nationality: (United Kingdom) British
- Active years: 1952, 1954
- Team: non-works Cooper
- Entries: 5
- Championships: 0
- Wins: 0
- Podiums: 0
- Career points: 0
- Pole positions: 0
- Fastest laps: 0
- First entry: 1952 Swiss Grand Prix
- Last entry: 1954 British Grand Prix

Eric Brandon (18 July 1920 – 8 August 1982) was a motor racing driver and businessman. He was closely associated with the Cooper Car Company, and was instrumental in the early development of the company.

When Brandon and his boyhood friend John Cooper were released from military service after World War II they built two cars to the new National 500 cc (30.5 cu in) regulations. Brandon, whose family business was electrical goods, had access to BTH magnetos for the JAP engines, which Cooper's father Charlie then acquired. Brandon entered his Cooper in numerous hillclimbs and sprints and in 1947, at Gransden Lodge airfield, he won Britain's first-ever 500 cc circuit race. He also won the first Formula Three title, in 1951.

Later in the 1950s, Brandon entered five World Championship Grands Prix in larger, Formula Two Cooper-Bristols, but failed to score any Championship points. For much of his career Brandon raced for the Ecurie Richmond team, which he formed with Alan Brown. In 1955, he funded the construction of his own Halseylec sports car, named after his electrical supplies company. He continued to compete in cars until 1956, but had become increasingly involved in hydroplane racing and by 1957 had devoted himself entirely to this outlet for his competitive spirit.

== Complete Formula One World Championship results ==
(key)

Year	Entrant	Chassis	Engine	1	2	3	4	5	6	7	8	9	WDC	Points
1952	Ecurie Richmond	Cooper T20	Bristol Straight-6	SUI; 8	500	BEL; 9	FRA	GBR; 20	GER	NED	ITA; 13		NC	0
1954	Ecurie Richmond	Cooper T23	Bristol Straight-6	ARG	500	BEL	FRA	GBR; Ret	GER	SUI	ITA	ESP	NC	0
