= Enrico Platé =

Swiss racing driver (1909–1954)

Scuderia Platé
- Full name: Scuderia Enrico Platé
- Base: Switzerland
- Founder(s): Enrico Platé
- Noted staff: Enrico Platé
- Noted drivers: (Italy) Tazio Nuvolari (Switzerland) Toulo de Graffenried (Thailand) B. Bira (United States) Harry Schell (Monaco) Louis Chiron

Formula One World Championship career
- First entry: 1950 British Grand Prix
- Races entered: 12
- Constructors: Maserati
- Engines: Maserati; Platé
- Drivers' Championships: 0
- Race victories: 0
- Pole positions: 0
- Fastest laps: 0
- Final entry: 1953 Dutch Grand Prix

Enrico Platé (28 January 1909, Milan, Italy – 2 February 1954, Buenos Aires, Argentina) was a motor racing driver and team manager. Although born in Italy, Platé raced, and latterly ran his racing team Scuderia Enrico Platé, under Swiss nationality. He began his career as a mechanic, but swiftly took to racing cars in addition to repairing them. His best result as a driver was fourth place (albeit also last place) in the 1938 Modena Autodrome. Although he did not achieve any notable success in the pre-World War II voiturette class, Enrico Platé became a significant and influential figure in post-war grand prix and early Formula One racing as a team owner. During his brief career in this role, Platé ran Maseratis for notable drivers such as Prince Bira, Harry Schell and fellow Swiss Toulo de Graffenried.

== Team owner ==
Although he did not fully withdraw from driving until 1948, Enrico Platé tasted success as a team owner as early as 1946, when he provided the car that took racing legend Tazio Nuvolari to his final grand prix victory, in the Albi Grand Prix. In 1947 Christian Kautz won the prestigious Grand Prix de la Marne at Reims-Gueux in a Platé-entered Maserati 4CL, and the following year Nello Pagani drove the same car to victory in the Pau Grand Prix. Sadly for Scuderia Enrico Platé, the team also tasted tragedy in 1948 when Kautz was killed while driving one of their 4CLs in his home Grand Prix at Bremgarten. In 1949 de Graffenried scored Platé's final major race win with victory in the British Grand Prix, this time in Platé's new Maserati 4CLT/48. Bira took the lesser Swedish Summer Grand Prix later that season.

With the dominance of first the works Alfa Romeo and then Ferrari teams, Platé's cars were never front-runners in the early years of the Formula One World Championship. However, minor and non-Championship Grands Prix events saw Scuderia Enrico Platé take a further five race victories between 1950 and 1953. Always loyal to the Maserati marque, Platé's team rebuilt one of the Italian company's Maserati 4CLT Formula One cars to Formula Two specification for the 1952 and 1953 seasons, which were run to F2 regulations. The revisions and alterations were sufficiently significant for Maserati to allow Scuderia Platé to enter the car as the Maserati-Platé, making Platé the only Formula One engine manufacturer to originate in Switzerland.^{1}

In the early part of 1953 Platé began to run into financial difficulty. Although he maintained a presence at races, this was usually by preparing cars for de Graffenried rather than as an entrant himself. Enrico Platé met a premature end when he was killed in an accident during a brief return to the track, driving in a minor Formula Libre race in Buenos Aires in 1954.

== Complete Formula One World Championship results ==
(key) (Results in bold indicate pole position; results in italics indicate fastest lap; † indicates shared drive.)

Year	Chassis	Engine(s)	Tyres	Drivers	1	2	3	4	5	6	7	8	9
1950	Maserati 4CLT/48	Maserati 4CLT 1.5 L4s	P		GBR	MON	500	SUI	BEL	FRA	ITA		
1950	Maserati 4CLT/48	Maserati 4CLT 1.5 L4s	P	(Switzerland) Toulo de Graffenried	Ret	Ret		6			6		
1950	Maserati 4CLT/48	Maserati 4CLT 1.5 L4s	P	(Thailand) B. Bira	Ret	5		4			Ret		
1951	Maserati 4CLT/48	Maserati 4CLT 1.5 L4s	P		SUI	500	BEL	FRA	GBR	GER	ITA	ESP	
1951	Maserati 4CLT/48	Maserati 4CLT 1.5 L4s	P	(Monaco) Louis Chiron	7								
1951	Maserati 4CLT/48	Maserati 4CLT 1.5 L4s	P	(United States) Harry Schell	12			Ret					
1951	Maserati 4CLT/48	Maserati 4CLT 1.5 L4s	P	(Switzerland) Toulo de Graffenried				Ret		Ret			
1952	Maserati 4CLT/48	Platé 2.0 L4	P		SUI	500	BEL	FRA	GBR	GER	NED	ITA	
1952	Maserati 4CLT/48	Platé 2.0 L4	P	(Switzerland) Toulo de Graffenried	6			Ret†	19			DNQ	
1952	Maserati 4CLT/48	Platé 2.0 L4	P	(United States) Harry Schell	Ret			Ret†	17				
1952	Maserati 4CLT/48	Platé 2.0 L4	P	(Argentina) Alberto Crespo								DNQ	
1953	Maserati A6GCM	Maserati A6 2.0 L6	P		ARG	500	NED	BEL	FRA	GBR	GER	SUI	ITA
1953	Maserati A6GCM	Maserati A6 2.0 L6	P	(Switzerland) Toulo de Graffenried			5						

† Indicates shared drive

== Footnotes ==
^{1} Discounting Sauber's rebranded, British-built engines used during the 1993 Formula One season.
