= Kenneth McAlpine =

British racing driver (1920–2023)

- Born: 21 September 1920; Cobham, Surrey, England
- Died: 8 April 2023 (aged 102)

Formula One World Championship career
- Nationality: (United Kingdom) British
- Active years: 1952, 1953, 1955
- Team: Connaught
- Entries: 7
- Championships: 0
- Wins: 0
- Podiums: 0
- Career points: 0
- Pole positions: 0
- Fastest laps: 0
- First entry: 1952 British Grand Prix
- Last entry: 1955 British Grand Prix

Kenneth McAlpine OBE DL (21 September 1920 – 8 April 2023) was a British racing driver from England.

== Biography ==
McAlpine was born in Cobham, Surrey and was a grandson of Scottish civil engineer Sir Robert McAlpine, 1st Baronet. He participated in seven Formula One World Championship Grands Prix, debuting on 19 July 1952 at the British Grand Prix alongside fellow Connaught driver Kenneth Downing. During the development of the Connaught Racing Team based at Send in Surrey, McAlpine became a considerable financial backer and enjoyed several team owner triumphs including Tony Brooks's memorable F1 victory at the 1955 Syracuse Grand Prix. The team was eventually broken up in 1957 and cars sold off after McAlpine ceased receiving tax concessions.

McAlpine and co-driver Eric Thompson took part in the 1955 24 Hours of Le Mans driving a Connaught ALSR. They retired after 6 hours with engine failure.

After retiring from motor racing, McAlpine returned full-time to his civil engineering business and later established a successful English wine growing and bottling business at his estate in Lamberhurst, Kent. He was also a member of The Air Squadron.

McAlpine died on 8 April 2023, at the age of 102.

=== Complete Formula One World Championship results ===
(key)

Year	Entrant	Chassis	Engine	1	2	3	4	5	6	7	8	9	WDC	Points
1952	Connaught Engineering	Connaught Type A	Lea Francis L4	SUI	500	BEL	FRA	GBR; 16	GER	NED	ITA; Ret		NC	0
1953	Connaught Engineering	Connaught Type A	Lea Francis L4	ARG	500	NED; Ret	BEL	FRA	GBR; Ret	GER; 13	SUI	ITA; NC	NC	0
1955	Connaught Engineering	Connaught Type B	Alta L4	ARG	MON	500	BEL	NED	GBR; Ret	ITA			NC	0

=== Non-championship results ===
(key)

Year	Entrant	Chassis	Engine	1	2	3	4	5	6	7	8	9	10	11	12	13	14	15	16	17	18	19	20	21	22	23	24	25	26	27	28	29	30	31	32	33	34	35
1951	Connaught Engineering	Connaught Type A	Lea-Francis L4	SYR	PAU	RIC	SRM	BOR	INT	PAR	ULS	SCO	NED	ALB	PES	BAR	GOO; DNA																					
1952	Connaught Engineering	Connaught Type A	Lea-Francis L4	RIO	SYR	VAL	RIC; DNA	LAV; DNA	PAU	IBS; DNA	MAR	AST	INT; 10	ELÄ	NAP	EIF	PAR	ALB	FRO	ULS	MNZ	LAC	ESS; 2	MAR	SAB	CAE	DMT	COM	NAT; DNA	BAU	MOD	CAD	SKA	MAD; 5	AVU	JOE; Ret	NEW; 2	RIO
1953	Connaught Engineering	Connaught Type A	Lea-Francis L4	SYR	PAU	LAV; 5	AST	BOR	INT; 7	ELÄ	NAP	ULS; 8	WIN	FRO	COR; Ret	EIF	ALB	PRI	ESS; 1	MID	ROU	CRY; Ret	AVU	USF; Ret	LAC	BRI	CHE	SAB	NEW	CAD	RED	SKA	LON	MOD; NC	MAD	JOE; Ret	CUR; Ret	
1954	Connaught Engineering	Connaught Type A	Lea-Francis L4	SYR	PAU	LAV; 3	BOR	INT; 15	BAR	CUR	ROM	FRO	COR	BRC	CRY	ROU	CAE	AUG	COR	OUL	RED	PES	JOE	CAD	BER	GOO	DTT											
1955	Connaught Engineering	Connaught Type B	Alta L4	BUE	VLN	PAU	GLV	BOR	INT; Ret	NAP	ALB	CUR	CRN	LON	DRT	RDX	DTT	OUL	AVO	SYR																		
