= 1953 Coronation Trophy =

Race details
- Date: 25 May 1953
- Official name: III Coronation Trophy
- Location: Crystal Palace Circuit, London
- Course: Permanent racing facility
- Course length: 2.164 km (1.349 miles)
- Distance: 10 (final) laps, 21.64 km (13.49 miles)

Pole position
Driver	(United Kingdom) Tony Rolt	Connaught
- Grid positions set by heat results

Fastest lap
Driver	(United Kingdom) Tony Rolt	Connaught
- Time: 1:08.8

Podium
First	(United Kingdom) Tony Rolt	Connaught
Second	(United Kingdom) Ken Wharton	Cooper-Bristol
Third	(United Kingdom) Peter Whitehead	Cooper-Alta

The 3rd Coronation Trophy was a Formula Two motor race held on 25 May 1953 at Crystal Palace Circuit, London. The race was run over two heats of 10 laps and a final of 10 laps.

Tony Rolt in a Connaught Type A-Lea Francis won Heat 1 and set fastest lap in that heat. Peter Whitehead in a Cooper T24-Alta won Heat 2 and set fastest lap in that heat.

Rolt won the final, starting from pole by way of being fastest winner in the heats, and set fastest lap. Ken Wharton was second in a Cooper T23-Bristol and Peter Whitehead third.

== Entries ==
Note - a blue background denotes entries that DNA (did not arrive)

No.	Driver	Entrant	Car
1	(United Kingdom) Roy Salvadori	Connaught Engineering	Connaught Type A-Lea Francis
2	(United Kingdom) Kenneth McAlpine	Connaught Engineering	Connaught Type A-Lea Francis
3	(United Kingdom) John Coombs	Connaught Engineering	Connaught Type A-Lea Francis
4	(United Kingdom) Peter Collins	HW Motors Ltd.	HWM-Alta
5	(United Kingdom) Lance Macklin	HW Motors Ltd.	HWM-Alta
6	(United Kingdom) Jack Fairman	HW Motors Ltd.	HWM-Alta
6	(United Kingdom) Duncan Hamilton	HW Motors Ltd.	HWM-Alta
7	(United Kingdom) Stirling Moss	Cooper Car Company	Cooper T24-Alta
8	(United Kingdom) Bobbie Baird	Bobbie Baird	Ferrari 500
9	(Republic of Ireland) Torrie Large	Bobbie Baird	Alta F2
10	(United Kingdom) Peter Whitehead	Atlantic Stable	Cooper T24-Alta
11	(United States) Tom Cole	Atlantic Stable	Cooper T23-Bristol
12	(United Kingdom) Graham Whitehead	Atlantic Stable	Cooper T23-Bristol
14	(United Kingdom) Tony Crook	Tony Crook	Cooper T20-Bristol
15	(United Kingdom) Frank Curtis	Frank Curtis	HWM-Alta
16	(United Kingdom) John Barber	John Barber	Cooper T23-Bristol
17	(United Kingdom) Alan Brown	Equipe Anglaise	Cooper T23-Alfa Romeo
18	(United Kingdom) Leslie Marr	Leslie Marr	Connaught Type A-Lea Francis
19	(United Kingdom) Ken Wharton	Ken Wharton	Cooper T23-Bristol
20	(United Kingdom) John Webb	John Webb	Turner-Lea Francis
21	(United Kingdom) Archie Bryde	Archie Bryde	Cooper T20-Bristol
22	(United Kingdom) Peter Murdoch	Oliver Simpson	Alta F2
23	(United Kingdom) Paul Emery	Emeryson Cars	Emeryson-Alta
24	(United Kingdom) Bertie Bradnack	Bertie Bradnack	Woden-Bristol
25	(United Kingdom) Bill Aston	Bill Aston	Aston Butterworth
26	(United Kingdom) Donald Bennett	Donald Bennett	Cooper T19-Vincent

== Results ==
=== Heats ===
Heat 1

Pos	Driver	Car	Time/Ret.	Grid
1	(United Kingdom) Tony Rolt	Connaught-Lea Francis	11:47.4, 113.92kph	4
2	(United Kingdom) Ken Wharton	Cooper-Bristol	+0.6s	5
3	(United Kingdom) Lance Macklin	HWM-Alta	+18.8s	6
4	(United Kingdom) Stirling Moss	Cooper-Alta	+27.6s	3
5	(United Kingdom) Bill Aston	Aston Butterworth	+47.6s	2
6	(Republic of Ireland) Torrie Large	Alta F2	+1:50.6	8
Ret	(United Kingdom) Archie Bryde	Cooper-Bristol	8 laps, mechanical	1
DNS	(United Kingdom) Paul Emery	Emeryson-Alta		7

Heat 2

Pos	Driver	Car	Time/Ret.	Grid
1	(United Kingdom) Peter Whitehead	Cooper-Alta	12:00.8, 11.70kph	4
2	(United Kingdom) Peter Collins	HWM-Alta	+11.4s	3
3	(United Kingdom) Graham Whitehead	Cooper-Bristol	+12.0s	2
4	(United Kingdom) Jack Fairman	HWM-Alta	+46.2s	1
5	(United Kingdom) Leslie Marr	Connaught-Lea Francis	+46.6s	5
6	(United Kingdom) John Barber	Cooper-Bristol		8
Ret	(United Kingdom) Bobbie Baird	Ferrari	3 laps, crash	7
Ret	(United Kingdom) Tony Crook	Cooper-Bristol	2 laps	6
Ret	(United Kingdom) Donald Bennett	Cooper-Vincent	0 laps, chain drive	10
Ret	(United Kingdom) Alan Brown	Cooper-Alfa Romeo	0 laps, fuel pump	9

=== Final ===
Grid positions for the final were determined by the drivers' finishing times in the heats.

Pos.	Driver	Car	Time/Retired	Grid
1	(United Kingdom) Tony Rolt	Connaught-Lea Francis	11:42.2, 114.72kph	1
2	(United Kingdom) Ken Wharton	Cooper-Bristol	+2.0s	2
3	(United Kingdom) Peter Whitehead	Cooper-Alta	+14.0s	3
4	(United Kingdom) Lance Macklin	HWM-Alta	+14.6s	4
5	(United Kingdom) Stirling Moss	Cooper-Alta	+21.8s	7
6	(United Kingdom) Graham Whitehead	Cooper-Bristol	+25.6s	6
7	(United Kingdom) Peter Collins	HWM-Alta	+29.6s	5
8	(United Kingdom) Bill Aston	Aston Butterworth	+38.2s	8
9	(United Kingdom) Jack Fairman	HWM-Alta	+1:15.4	10
10	(Republic of Ireland) Torrie Large	Alta F2	+1 lap	9
Ret	(United Kingdom) Leslie Marr	Connaught-Lea Francis	1 lap, crash	11

Previous race: 1953 Grand Prix des Frontières	Formula One non-championship races 1953 season	Next race: 1953 Snetterton Coronation Trophy
Previous race: 1952 Coronation Trophy	Coronation Trophy	Next race: 1954 Coronation Trophy
