= 1952 Paris Grand Prix =

- Non-championship race in the 1952 Formula One season
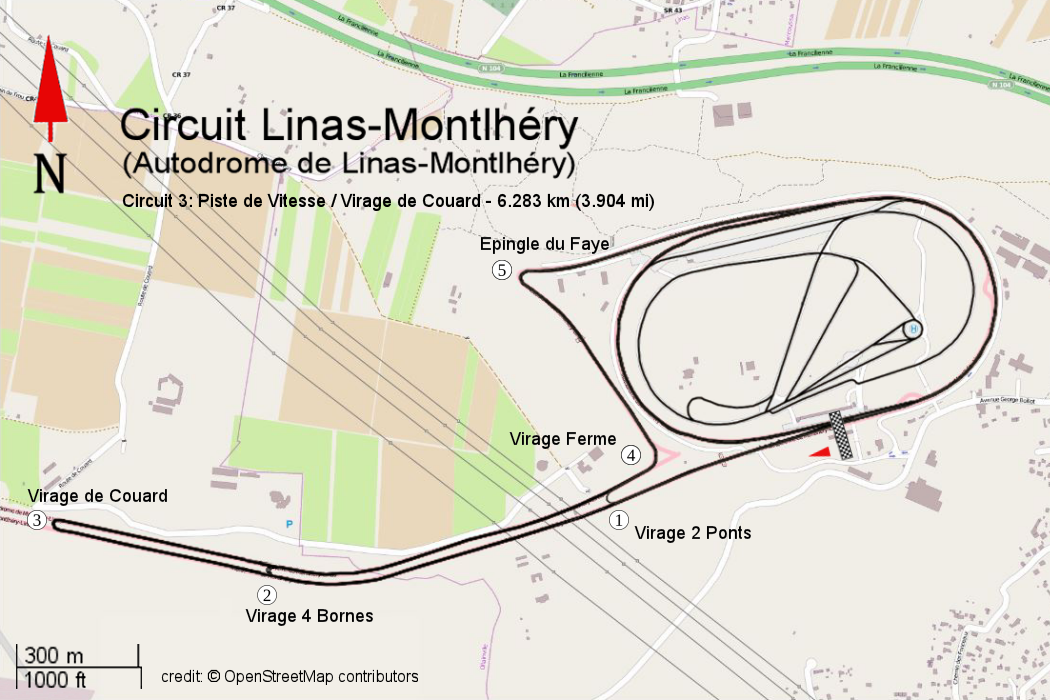

Race details
- Date: 25 May 1952
- Official name: VI Grand Prix de Paris
- Location: Autodrome de Linas-Montlhéry, Montlhéry, France
- Course: Permanent racing facility
- Course length: 6.283 km (3.904 mi)
- Distance: 74 laps, 464.924 km (288.890 mi)

Pole position
| Driver | (France) Robert Manzon | Gordini |
- Time: 2:21.5

Fastest lap
| Driver | (Italy) Piero Taruffi | Ferrari |
- Time: 2:21.2

Podium
| First | (Italy) Piero Taruffi | Ferrari |
| Second | (Italy) Giuseppe Farina; (France) André Simon | Ferrari |
| Third | (France) Louis Rosier | Ferrari |

The 6th Grand Prix de Paris was a Non-Championship Formula Two motor race held on 25 May 1952 at the Autodrome de Linas-Montlhéry, in Montlhéry, Essonne, France. Race distance was decided not by distance but by time, the duration being 3 hours. The race was won by Piero Taruffi in a Ferrari 500, setting fastest lap in the process. Taruffi's teammates Giuseppe Farina and André Simon shared second place, with Louis Rosier third in his own Ferrari 500. Robert Manzon started from pole in a Gordini Type 16 but retired with a differential failure.

== Results ==
| Pos | No. | Driver | Entrant | Constructor | Time/Retired | Grid |
|---|---|---|---|---|---|---|
| 1 | 6 | (Italy) Piero Taruffi | Scuderia Ferrari | Ferrari 500 | 74 laps, 153.35 kph | 2 |
| 2 | 2 | (France) André Simon (Italy) Giuseppe Farina | Scuderia Ferrari | Ferrari 500 | +3 laps | 4 |
| 3 | 14 | (France) Louis Rosier | Ecurie Rosier | Ferrari 500 | +4 laps | 6 |
| NC | 20 | (United Kingdom) Lance Macklin (United Kingdom) Peter Collins | HW Motors Ltd. | HWM-Alta | +10 laps | 11 |
| NC | 8 | (France) Robert Manzon | Equipe Gordini | Gordini Type 16 | +15 laps, differential | 1 |
| NC | 38 | (France) Marcel Balsa | Marcel Balsa | BMW Special | +16 laps | 14 |
| NC | 24 | (France) Yves Giraud-Cabantous | HW Motors Ltd. | HWM-Alta | +23 laps | 13 |
| Ret | 12 | (Thailand) B. Bira | Equipe Gordini | Simca Gordini Type 15 | 48 laps, differential | 7 |
| Ret | 36 | (Italy) Gianfranco Comotti | Scuderia Marzotto | Ferrari 166 | 46 laps, engine | 15 |
| Ret | 16 | (Switzerland) Emmanuel de Graffenried | Scuderia Enrico Platé | Maserati 4CLT/48 | 42 laps, gudgeon pin | 16 |
| Ret | 34 | (United Kingdom) Robin Montgomerie-Charrington | Bill Aston | Aston Butterworth | 26 laps, clutch | 12 |
| Ret | 26 | (United Kingdom) Peter Whitehead | Peter Whitehead | Alta F2 | 20 laps, gear lever | 9 |
| Ret | 30 | (Belgium) Johnny Claes | Johnny Claes | Simca-Gordini Type 15 | 20 laps, stub axle | 10 |
| Ret | 10 | (France) Jean Behra | Yves Giraud-Cabantous | Gordini Type 16 | 19 laps, differential | 5 |
| Ret | 18 | (United States) Harry Schell | Scuderia Enrico Platé | Maserati 4CLT/48 | 12 laps, oil pipe | 18 |
| Ret | 22 | (United Kingdom) Peter Collins | HW Motors Ltd. | HWM-Alta | 2 laps, magneto | 8 |
| DSQ | 4 | (Italy) Luigi Villoresi (Italy) Giuseppe Farina | Scuderia Ferrari | Ferrari 500 | 69 laps, outside assistance | 3 |
| DSQ | 32 | (France) Eugene Martin (France) Armand Philippe | Eugene Martin | Jicey-Veritas | 49 laps, driver change on circuit | 17 |
| DNS | 28 | (France) Elie Bayol | Elie Bayol | O.S.C.A. MT4 | | |

| Previous race: 1952 Eifelrennen | Formula One non-championship races 1952 season | Next race: 1952 Albi Grand Prix |
| Previous race: 1951 Paris Grand Prix | Paris Grand Prix | Next race: 1953 Paris Grand Prix |
