= 1953 Crystal Palace Trophy =

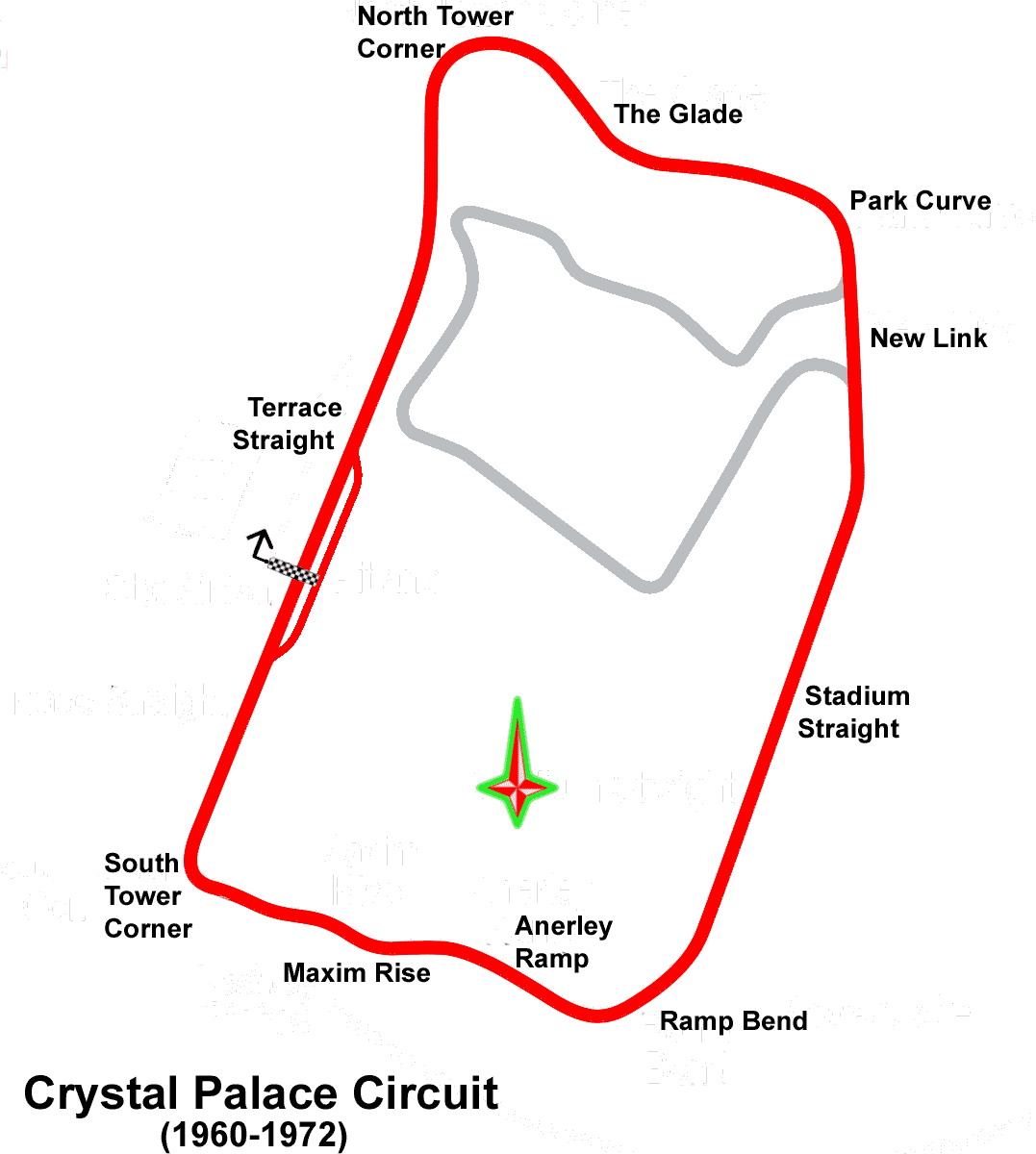

Race details
- Date: 11 July 1953
- Official name: I Crystal Palace Trophy
- Location: Crystal Palace Circuit, London
- Course: Permanent racing facility
- Course length: 2.237 km (1.390 mi)
- Distance: 15 laps, 33.557 km (20.851 mi)
- Attendance: 7823

Pole position
Driver	(United Kingdom) Tony Rolt	Connaught-Lea Francis

Fastest lap
Driver	(United Kingdom) Roy Salvadori	Connaught-Lea Francis
- Time: 1:08.0

Podium
First	(United Kingdom) Tony Rolt	Connaught-Lea Francis
Second	(United Kingdom) Roy Salvadori	Connaught-Lea Francis
Third	(United Kingdom) Les Leston	Cooper-JAP

The 1st Crystal Palace Trophy was a Formula Two motor race held on 11 July 1953 at Crystal Palace Circuit, London. The race was run over 15 laps and was won by Tony Rolt in a Connaught Type A-Lea Francis. Roy Salvadori was second in another Connaught, also setting fastest lap, and Les Leston was third in a Cooper T26-JAP.

== Results ==
Pos.	No.	Driver	Entrant	Car	Time/Retired	Grid
1	1	(United Kingdom) Tony Rolt	R.R.C. Walker Racing Team	Connaught Type A-Lea Francis	17:23.4, 115.78kph	1
2	8	(United Kingdom) Roy Salvadori	Connaught Engineering	Connaught Type A-Lea Francis	15 laps	2
3	14	(United Kingdom) Les Leston	Cooper Car Company	Cooper T26-JAP	15 laps	3
4	11	(United Kingdom) Lance Macklin	HW Motors	HWM-Alta	15 laps	4
5	7	(United Kingdom) Peter Whitehead	Atlantic Stable	Cooper T24-Alta	15 laps	5
6	12	(United Kingdom) Duncan Hamilton	HW Motors	HWM-Alta	15 laps	7
7	5	(United Kingdom) Bill Aston	Bill Aston	Aston Butterworth	+1 lap	8
8	6	(United Kingdom) Austen Nurse	HW Motors	HWM-Alta	+1 lap	9
9	4	(United Kingdom) John Webb	John Webb	Turner-Lea Francis	+1 lap	12
10	3	(United Kingdom) Paul Emery	Emeryson Cars	Emeryson-Aston Martin	+2 laps	10
Ret	16	(United Kingdom) Donald Bennett	Donald Bennett	Cooper T18-Vincent	1 lap, engine	11
Ret	9	(United Kingdom) Kenneth McAlpine	Connaught Engineering	Connaught Type A-Lea Francis	0 laps	6
DNA	2	(United Kingdom) Jimmy Somervail	Border Reivers	Cooper T20-Bristol		
DNA	2	(United Kingdom) Keith Hall	Border Reivers	Cooper T20-Bristol		
DNA	10	(United Kingdom) Cliff Davis	Connaught Engineering	Connaught Type A-Lea Francis		
DNA	11	(United Kingdom) Peter Collins	HW Motors	HWM-Alta	car driven by Macklin	
DNA	15	(United Kingdom) Les Leston	Cooper Car Company	Cooper T26-JAP	drove no. 14	

Previous race: 1953 Rouen Grand Prix	Formula One non-championship races 1953 season	Next race: 1953 Avusrennen
Previous race: —	Crystal Palace Trophy	Next race: 1954 Crystal Palace Trophy
