= 1952 Monza Grand Prix =

Formula Two race

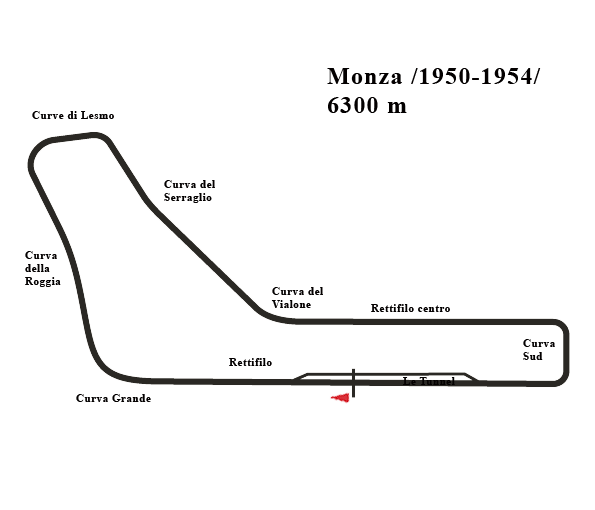

Race details
- Date: 8 June 1952
- Official name: V Gran Premio dell'Autodromo di Monza
- Location: Monza Circuit, Milan, Italy
- Course: Permanent racing facility
- Course length: 6.301 km (3.915 mi)
- Distance: 2 × 35 laps, 441.056 km (274.059 mi)

Pole position
| Driver | (Italy) Alberto Ascari | Ferrari |

Fastest lap
| Driver | (Italy) Giuseppe Farina | Ferrari |
- Time: 2:06.2

Podium
| First | (Italy) Giuseppe Farina | Ferrari |
| Second | (France) André Simon | Ferrari |
| Third | (Switzerland) Rudi Fischer | Ferrari |

The 5th Gran Premio dell'Autodromo di Monza was a Formula Two motor race held on 8 June 1952 at the Monza Circuit, Italy. The race was run over two heats each of 35 laps, with the winner being decided by aggregate time. The winner was Giuseppe Farina in a Ferrari 500, who also set overall fastest lap. Farina's teammate André Simon was second and Rudi Fischer third in a privateer 500. Juan Manuel Fangio suffered a crash in heat 1 on the third lap after suffering extreme fatigue while driving through the night from Dundrod in Northern Ireland to Monza, and he only arrived half an hour before the start. Fangio suffered injuries that sidelined him for the rest of the year. Ferrari driver Alberto Ascari started from pole in both heats and set fastest lap in heat 1 but succumbed to mechanical failure in heat 2. Ascari won heat 1 and Farina won heat 2.

== Classification ==
=== Race ===
| Pos | No | Driver | Entrant | Car | Time/Retired | Grid^{1} | Heat 1 | Heat 2 |
|---|---|---|---|---|---|---|---|---|
| 1 | 20 | (Italy) Giuseppe Farina | Scuderia Ferrari | Ferrari 500 | 2:31:15.0, 176.20 kph | 2 | 2 | 1 |
| 2 | 24 | (France) André Simon | Scuderia Ferrari | Ferrari 500 | +1 lap | 5 | 3 | 2 |
| 3 | 30 | (Switzerland) Rudi Fischer | Ecurie Espadon | Ferrari 500 | +4 laps | 7 | 5 | 3 |
| 4 | 48 | (United Kingdom) Peter Walker | Peter Whitehead | Ferrari 125 | +4 laps | 8 | 6 | 4 |
| 5 | 38 | (United Kingdom) Eric Brandon | Ecurie Richmond | Cooper T20-Bristol | +5 laps | 10 | 10 | 6 |
| 6 | 36 | (United Kingdom) Alan Brown | Ecurie Richmond | Cooper T20-Bristol | +6 laps | 20 | 13 | 5 |
| NC | 16 | (Italy) Felice Bonetto | Officine Alfieri Maserati | Maserati A6GCM | +6 laps | 6 | 4 | NC |
| NC | 32 | (Belgium) Johnny Claes | HW Motors Ltd | HWM-Alta | +7 laps | 15 | 14 | 7 |
| NC | 52 | (Australia) Tony Gaze | HW Motors Ltd | HWM-Alta | +9 laps | 12 | NC | 8 |
| Ret | 8 | (United Kingdom) Robin Montgomerie-Charrington | Bill Aston | Aston Butterworth | 52 laps | 17 | 12 | 20 laps |
| Ret | 22 | (Italy) Alberto Ascari | Scuderia Ferrari | Ferrari 500 | 49 laps | 1 | 1 | 14 laps, camshaft |
| Ret | 10 | (Italy) Piero Carini | Scuderia Marzotto | Ferrari 166 | 45 laps | 13 | 11 | 13 laps |
| Ret | 42 | (United Kingdom) Peter Whitehead | Peter Whitehead | Alta F2 | 37 laps | 14 | 7 | 5 laps |
| Ret | 26 | (Italy) Luigi Villoresi | Scuderia Ferrari | Ferrari 500 | 32 laps | 4 | 8 | DNS, valve |
| Ret | 54 | (United Kingdom) Ken Wharton | Scuderia Franera | Frazer Nash FN48 | 32 laps | 9 | 9 | DNS, chassis |
| Ret | 2 | (Brazil) Chico Landi | Escuderia Bandeirantes | Maserati A6GCM | 31 laps | 19 | 15 | DNS |
| Ret | 4 | (Brazil) Gino Bianco | Escuderia Bandeirantes | Maserati A6GCM | 28 laps | 24 | NC | - |
| Ret | 14 | (Argentina) José Froilán González | Officine Alfieri Maserati | Maserati A6GCM | 27 laps | 3 | 27 laps, magneto | - |
| Ret | 58 | (Belgium) Charles de Tornaco | Ecurie Francorchamps | Ferrari 500 | 17 laps | 26 | 17 laps | - |
| Ret | 40 | (Italy) Giovanni Rocco | Ciro Monaci | Monaci | 10 laps | 23 | 10 laps | - |
| Ret | 44 | (Germany) Toni Ulmen | Toni Ulmen | Veritas Meteor | 9 laps | 18 | 9 laps | - |
| Ret | 34 | (United Kingdom) Duncan Hamilton | HW Motors Ltd | HWM-Alta | 8 laps | 11 | 8 laps | - |
| Ret | 12 | (Italy) Gianfranco Comotti | Scuderia Marzotto | Ferrari 166 | 6 laps | 16 | 6 laps, engine | - |
| Ret | 56 | (Switzerland) Ottorino Volonterio | Ottorino Volonterio | Ferrari 166 | 4 laps | 25 | 4 laps | - |
| Ret | 6 | (United Kingdom) Bill Aston | Bill Aston | Aston Butterworth | 4 laps | 22 | 4 laps, mechanical | - |
| Ret | 18 | (Argentina) Juan Manuel Fangio | Officine Alfieri Maserati | Maserati A6GCM | 2 laps | 29 | 2 laps, crash | - |
| Ret | 60 | (Italy) Giuseppe Ruggiero | Giuseppe Ruggiero | Maserati A6G | 1 lap | 28 | 1 lap | - |
| Ret | 50 | (Italy) Giampiero Bianchetti | Giampiero Bianchetti | Ferrari 166 SC | 1 lap | 27 | 1 lap | - |
| Ret | 28 | (Switzerland) Peter Hirt | Ecurie Espadon | Ferrari 212 | 0 laps | 21 | 0 laps, mechanical | - |

^{1}Heat 1 grid; grid places for heat 2 were determined by the finishing order in heat 1

| Previous race: 1952 Ulster Trophy | Formula One non-championship races 1952 season | Next race: 1952 Circuit du Lac |
| Previous race: 1951 Monza Grand Prix | Monza Grand Prix | Next race: 1953 Monza Grand Prix |
