= 1952 Lavant Cup =

- Non-championship race in the 1952 Formula One season

Race details
- Date: 14 April 1952
- Official name: IV Lavant Cup
- Location: Chichester, West Sussex, UK
- Course: Goodwood Circuit
- Course length: 3.830 km (2.388 miles)
- Distance: 6 laps, 22.980 km (14.328 miles)

Pole position
Driver	(United Kingdom) Mike Hawthorn	Cooper-Bristol

Fastest lap
Driver	(United Kingdom) Mike Hawthorn	Cooper-Bristol
- Time: 1:42

Podium
First	(United Kingdom) Mike Hawthorn	Cooper-Bristol
Second	(United Kingdom) Alan Brown	Cooper-Bristol
Third	(United Kingdom) Eric Brandon	Cooper-Bristol

The 4th Lavant Cup was a non-championship Formula Two motor race held at Goodwood Circuit on 14 April 1952. The race was won by Mike Hawthorn in a Cooper T20-Bristol, setting fastest lap in the process. Alan Brown and Eric Brandon in the same model of car were second and third.

== Results ==
Pos	No	Driver	Entrant	Car	Time/Retired	Grid
1	41	(United Kingdom) Mike Hawthorn	R.J. Chase	Cooper T20-Bristol	10:23.1, 83.46mph	1
2	10	(United Kingdom) Alan Brown	Ecurie Richmond	Cooper T20-Bristol	+20.9s	3
3	4	(United Kingdom) Eric Brandon	Ecurie Richmond	Cooper T20-Bristol	+1:20.9	5
4	33	(United Kingdom) Bill Dobson	Scuderia Ambrosiana	Ferrari 125	+1:48.7	8
5	42	(Australia) Tony Gaze	T. Gaze	Alta F2	6 laps	15
6	39	(United Kingdom) Lawrence Mitchell	L. Mitchell	Frazer Nash-Bristol	6 laps	9
7	45	(United Kingdom) Mike Christie	Mike Christie Racing Stable	Cooper T12-JAP	6 laps	13
8	47	(United Kingdom) Bill Aston	Bill Aston	Aston Butterworth	6 laps	6
9	36	(United Kingdom) Gordon Watson	G. Watson	Alta F2	6 laps	6
10	49	(United Kingdom) John Barber	J. Barber	Cooper T12-JAP	6 laps	10
11	40	(United Kingdom) Mike Keen	M. Keen	HRG-Lea Francis	6 laps	12
12	37	(United Kingdom) Horace Richards	H.A. Richards	H.A.R.-Riley	5 laps	14
Ret	34	(United Kingdom) George Abecassis	Hersham and Walton Motors	HWM-Alta	2 laps, accident	2
Ret	38	(United Kingdom) Norman Pugh	Ecurie Pughey	Cooper T12-JAP	1 lap	16
DNS	28	(United Kingdom) Ken Wharton	Scuderia Franera	Frazer Nash-Bristol	car not ready	4
DNS	46	(United Kingdom) John Cooper	Ecurie Richmond	Cooper T20-Bristol	-	7
DNA	33	(United Kingdom) David Murray	Scuderia Ambrosiana	Ferrari 125	car driven by Bill Dobson	-
DNA	35	(United Kingdom) Kenneth McAlpine	Kenneth McAlpine	Connaught A Type-Lea Francis	-	-
DNA	38	(United Kingdom) Rodney Nuckey	Ecurie Pughey	Cooper T12-JAP	car driven by Norman Pugh	-
DNA	43	(United Kingdom) Philip Fotheringham-Parker	W.B. Black	Connaught A Type-Lea Francis	-	-
DNA	45	(United Kingdom) Noel Johnson	Mike Christie Racing Stable	Cooper T12-JAP	car driven by Mike Christie	-
DNA	48	(United Kingdom) Ken Downing	K. Downing	Connaught A Type-Lea Francis	-	-

Previous race: 1952 Richmond Trophy	Formula One non-championship races 1952 season	Next race: 1952 Pau Grand Prix
Previous race: 1951 Lavant Cup	Lavant Cup	Next race: 1953 Lavant Cup
