= 1952 Grand Prix des Frontières =

1952 Frontières Grand Prix
- Non-championship race in the 1952 Formula One season
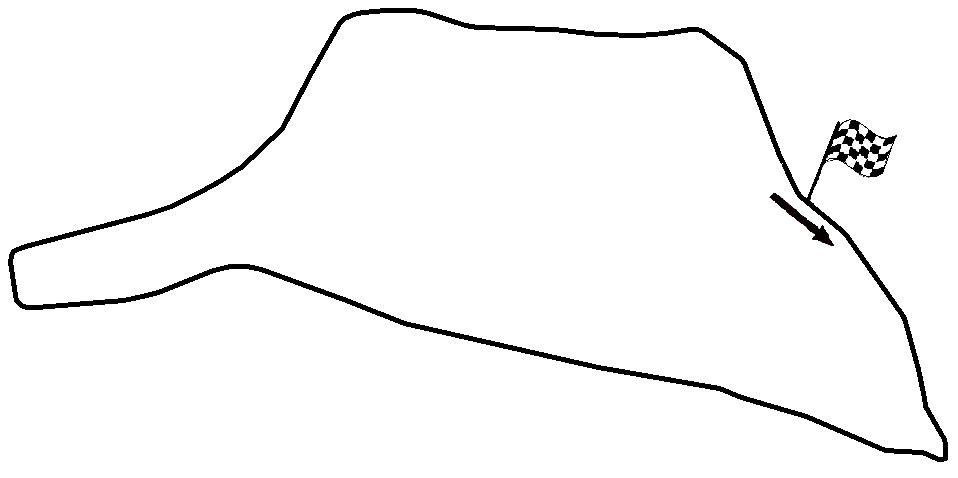

Race details
- Date: 1 June 1952
- Official name: XXII Grand Prix des Frontières
- Location: Chimay, Belgium
- Course: Temporary street circuit
- Course length: 10.799 km (6.710 mi)
- Distance: 22 laps, 237.588 km (147.630 mi)

Pole position
| Driver | (Belgium) Johnny Claes | Gordini |

Fastest lap
| Driver | (Belgium) Paul Frère | HWM-Alta |
- Time: 4:16.0

Podium
| First | (Belgium) Paul Frère | HWM-Alta |
| Second | (United Kingdom) Ken Downing | Connaught-Lea Francis |
| Third | (United Kingdom) Robin Montgomerie-Charrington | Aston Butterworth |

The 22nd Grand Prix des Frontières was a non-championship Formula Two motor race held on 1 June 1952 at the Chimay Street Circuit in Chimay, Belgium. The Grand Prix was won by Paul Frère in an HWM-Alta. Ken Downing finished second in a Connaught Type A-Lea Francis and Robin Montgomerie-Charrington was third in an Aston Butterworth. Johnny Claes started from pole in a Simca Gordini Type 15 but crashed out on the first lap.

== Classification ==
=== Race ===
| Pos | No | Driver | Entrant | Car | Time/Retired | Grid |
|---|---|---|---|---|---|---|
| 1 | 10 | (Belgium) Paul Frère | HW Motors Ltd | HWM-Alta | 1:38:48.0, 145.09 kph | 8 |
| 2 | 16 | (United Kingdom) Ken Downing | Ken Downing | Connaught Type A-Lea Francis | +1.0s | 5 |
| 3 | 44 | (United Kingdom) Robin Montgomerie-Charrington | Bill Aston | Aston Butterworth | +2 laps, out of fuel | 6 |
| 4 | 48 | (Belgium) Marcel Masuy | Marcel Masuy | Veritas RS-BMW | +2 laps | |
| 5 | 32 | (Belgium) Charles de Tornaco | HW Motors Ltd | HWM-Alta | +2 laps | 10 |
| 6 | 22 | (Belgium) Arthur Legat | Arthur Legat | Veritas Meteor | +3 laps | |
| 7 | 34 | (Belgium) Olivier Gendebien | Olivier Gendebien | Veritas RS-BMW | +3 laps | |
| Ret | 8 | (United Kingdom) John Heath | HW Motors Ltd | HWM-Alta | 11 laps, crash | 4 |
| Ret | 42 | (United Kingdom) Bill Aston | Bill Aston | Aston Butterworth | 7 laps, mechanical | 7 |
| Ret | 40 | (France) Paul Delabarre | Paul Delabarre | BMW Special | 5 laps | |
| Ret | 36 | (Belgium) Jacques Swaters | Jacques Swaters | Veritas RS-BMW 328 | 4 laps | - |
| Ret | 24 | (Belgium) Roger Meunier | Roger Meunier | Jicey-BMW 328 | 3 laps | |
| Ret | 20 | (Luxembourg) Honoré Wagner | Mme H. Wagner | Veritas RS-BMW 328 | 2 laps | |
| Ret | 18 | (France) Victor Polledry | Victor Polledry | Ferrari 166 S | 2 laps | |
| Ret | 30 | (Germany) Willi Heeks | Willi Heeks | AFM-BMW 328 | 1 lap, oil pump | |
| Ret | 26 | (Belgium) Roger Laurent | Ecurie Francorchamps | Ferrari 500 | 0 laps, crash | 3 |
| Ret | 4 | (Belgium) Johnny Claes | Vicomtesse de Walckiers | Simca Gordini Type 15 | 0 laps, crash | 1 |
| DNA | 6 | (United Kingdom) Gordon Watson | Vicomtesse de Walckiers | Simca Gordini Type 15 | | |
| DNA | 12 | (Belgium) Roger Laurent | HW Motors Ltd | HWM-Alta | driver drove #26 | |
| DNA | 28 | (Belgium) Camille Chard'Homme | Camille Chard'Homme | BMW Special | | |
| DNA | 46 | (United Kingdom) Bobby Baird | Bobby Baird | Ferrari 500 | | |

| Previous race: 1952 Albi Grand Prix | Formula One non-championship races 1952 season | Next race: 1952 Ulster Trophy |
| Previous race: 1951 Grand Prix des Frontières | Grand Prix des Frontières | Next race: 1953 Grand Prix des Frontières |
