= 1952 Marne Grand Prix =

- Non-championship race in the 1952 Formula One season
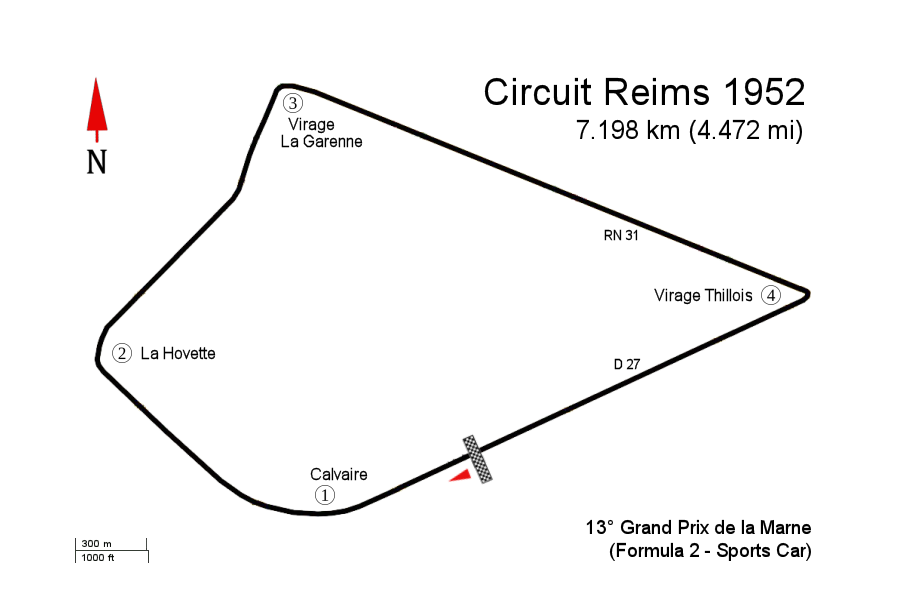

Race details
- Date: 29 June 1952
- Official name: XX Grand Prix de la Marne
- Location: Reims-Gueux, Reims
- Course: Permanent racing facility
- Course length: 7.198 km (4.473 mi)
- Distance: 71 laps, 511.058 km (317.557 mi)

Pole position
Driver	(Italy) Alberto Ascari	Ferrari
- Time: 2:26.2

Fastest lap
Driver	(Italy) Alberto Ascari	Ferrari
- Time: 2:28.2

Podium
First	(France) Jean Behra	Gordini
Second	(Italy) Giuseppe Farina	Ferrari
Third	(Italy) Alberto Ascari; (Italy) Luigi Villoresi	Ferrari

The 20th Grand Prix de la Marne was a non-championship Formula Two motor race held on 29 June 1952 at the Reims-Gueux circuit. It was the fourth round of the 1952 Les Grands Prix de France championship. Race distance was decided not by distance but by time, the duration being 3 hours. The race was won by Jean Behra driving a Gordini Type 16. Giuseppe Farina was second in a Ferrari 500, and his teammates Alberto Ascari and Luigi Villoresi shared third place, Villoresi's own car having suffered engine failure. Ascari set pole and fastest lap.

== Classification ==
=== Race ===
Pos	No	Driver	Entrant	Car	Time/Retired	Grid
1	4	(France) Jean Behra	Equipe Gordini	Gordini Type 16	71 laps, 169.52kph	4
2	12	(Italy) Giuseppe Farina	Scuderia Ferrari	Ferrari 500	+1 lap	2
3	10	(Italy) Alberto Ascari (Italy) Luigi Villoresi	Scuderia Ferrari	Ferrari 500	+1 lap	1
4	6	(Thailand) B. Bira	Equipe Gordini	Gordini Type 16	+2 laps	6
5	38	(France) Louis Rosier	Ecurie Rosier	Ferrari 500	+6 laps	11
6	44	(Belgium) Johnny Claes	Ecurie Belge	Simca Gordini Type 15	+7 laps	19
7	42	(United Kingdom) Mike Hawthorn	Archie Bryde	Cooper T20-Bristol	+7 laps	9
8	20	(France) Yves Giraud-Cabantous	HW Motors	HWM-Alta	+7 laps	13
NC	22	(Switzerland) Emmanuel de Graffenried	Scuderio Enrico Platé	Maserati 4CLT/48	+10 laps	20
NC	26	(United Kingdom) Stirling Moss	HW Motors	HWM-Alta	+11 laps	10
NC	34	(United Kingdom) Eric Brandon (United Kingdom) Alan Brown	Ecurie Richmond	Cooper T20-Bristol	+13 laps	12
Ret	2	(France) Robert Manzon	Equipe Gordini	Gordini Type 16	49 laps, driver injury	3
Ret	24	(United States) Harry Schell	Scuderia Enrico Platé	Maserati 4CLT/48	24 laps	23
Ret	16	(United Kingdom) Lance Macklin	HW Motors	HWM-Alta	23 laps, ignition	18
Ret	30	(Italy) Piero Carini	Scuderia Marzotto	Ferrari 166	17 laps	8
Ret	40	(United Kingdom) Robin Montgomerie-Charrington	Bill Aston	Aston Butterworth	15 laps, transmission	22
Ret	18	(United Kingdom) Peter Collins	HW Motors	HWM-Alta	13 laps, engine	16
Ret	28	(Italy) Gianfranco Comotti	Scuderia Marzotto	Ferrari 166	11 laps	17
Ret	32	(United Kingdom) Alan Brown	Ecurie Richmond	Cooper T20-Bristol	5 laps, engine	7
Ret	14	(Italy) Luigi Villoresi	Scuderia Ferrari	Ferrari 500	4 laps, engine	5
Ret	46	(United Kingdom) Peter Whitehead	Peter Whitehead	Alta F2	3 laps, gearbox	15
Ret	8	(France) Maurice Trintignant	Equipe Gordini	Simca Gordini Type 15	2 laps, engine	14
DNS	36	(France) Élie Bayol	Élie Bayol	O.S.C.A. MT4	car not ready	

Previous race: 1952 West Essex CC Race	Formula One non-championship races 1952 season	Next race: 1952 Sables Grand Prix
Previous race: 1937 Marne Grand Prix	Marne Grand Prix	Next race: —
