= 1953 London Trophy =

Race details
- Date: 19 September 1953
- Official name: I London Trophy
- Location: Crystal Palace Circuit, London
- Course: Permanent racing facility
- Course length: 2.172 km (1.350 mi)
- Distance: 20 laps, 43.452 km (27.000 mi)
- Attendance: 13244

Pole position
Driver	(United Kingdom) Stirling Moss	Cooper-Alta

Fastest lap
Driver	(United Kingdom) Ron Flockhart	Connaught-Lea Francis
- Time: 1:08.0

Podium
First	(United Kingdom) Stirling Moss	Cooper-Alta
Second	(United Kingdom) Tony Rolt	Connaught-Lea Francis
Third	(United Kingdom) Horace Gould	Cooper-Bristol

The 1st London Trophy was a Formula Two motor race held on 19 September 1953 at Crystal Palace Circuit, London. The race was run over two heats of 10 laps with the winner being decided by aggregate time.

Stirling Moss in a Cooper T24-Alta and Tony Rolt in a Connaught Type A-Lea Francis were first and second in both heats and on aggregate time. Bob Gerard in a Cooper T23-Bristol was third in the first heat and Ron Flockhart in a Connaught Type A was third in the second heat, and set fastest lap, but neither performed well in the other heat, and Horace Gould in a Cooper T23 was placed third.

== Entries ==
No.	Driver	Entrant	Car
1	(United Kingdom) Tony Rolt	R.R.C. Walker Racing Team	Connaught Type A-Lea Francis
2	(United Kingdom) Ken Wharton^{1}	Ken Wharton	Cooper T23-Bristol
3	(United Kingdom) Bernie Ecclestone	Bernard Ecclestone	Cooper T20-Bristol
4	(United Kingdom) Bob Gerard	F.R. Gerard	Cooper T23-Bristol
5	(United Kingdom) Rodney Nuckey	Rodney Nuckey	Cooper T23-Bristol
6	(United Kingdom) Horace Gould	Gould's Garage Bristol	Cooper T23-Bristol
7	(United Kingdom) Stirling Moss	Cooper Car Company	Cooper T24-Alta
8	(United Kingdom) John Webb	John Webb	Turner-Lea Francis
9	(United Kingdom) Paul Emery	Emeryson Cars	Emeryson-Aston Martin
10	(United Kingdom) Ron Flockhart	Connaught Engineering	Connaught Type A-Lea Francis
11	(United Kingdom) Tony Crook	Tony Crook	Cooper T20-Bristol
12	(United Kingdom) Austen Nurse	Sibley's Garage	HWM-Alta

^{1}Wharton DNA

== Results ==
=== Heats ===
Heat 1

Pos	Driver	Car	Time/Ret.
1	(United Kingdom) Stirling Moss	Cooper-Alta	11:48.0
2	(United Kingdom) Tony Rolt	Connaught-Lea Francis	+0.4s
3	(United Kingdom) Bob Gerard	Cooper-Bristol	+16.4s
4	(United Kingdom) Rodney Nuckey	Cooper-Bristol	
5	(United Kingdom) Horace Gould	Cooper-Bristol	
6	(United Kingdom) Bernie Ecclestone	Cooper-Bristol	
	(United Kingdom) John Webb	Turner-Lea Francis	
	(United Kingdom) Austen Nurse	HWM-Alta	
	(United Kingdom) Paul Emery	Emeryson-Aston Martin	
	(United Kingdom) Tony Crook	Cooper-Bristol	
DNS	(United Kingdom) Ron Flockhart	Connaught-Lea Francis	Engine

Heat 2

Pos	Driver	Car	Time/Ret.
1	(United Kingdom) Stirling Moss	Cooper-Alta	11:36.4
2	(United Kingdom) Tony Rolt	Connaught-Lea Francis	+2.4s
3	(United Kingdom) Ron Flockhart	Connaught-Lea Francis	+28.0s
4	(United Kingdom) Horace Gould	Cooper-Bristol	
5	(United Kingdom) Rodney Nuckey	Cooper-Bristol	
6	(United Kingdom) Bernie Ecclestone	Cooper-Bristol	
	(United Kingdom) John Webb	Turner-Lea Francis	
	(United Kingdom) Austen Nurse	HWM-Alta	
	(United Kingdom) Paul Emery	Emeryson-Aston Martin	
	(United Kingdom) Bob Gerard	Cooper-Bristol	
	(United Kingdom) Tony Crook	Cooper-Bristol	

=== Aggregate ===
Pos	Driver	Car	Time/Ret.
1	(United Kingdom) Stirling Moss	Cooper-Alta	23:24.2, 114.71kph
2	(United Kingdom) Tony Rolt	Connaught-Lea Francis	+3.0s
3	(United Kingdom) Horace Gould	Cooper-Bristol	+47.8s
4	(United Kingdom) Rodney Nuckey	Cooper-Bristol	+1:48.0
5	(United Kingdom) Bernie Ecclestone	Cooper-Bristol	+2:17.2
	(United Kingdom) John Webb	Turner-Lea Francis	
	(United Kingdom) Austen Nurse	HWM-Alta	
	(United Kingdom) Paul Emery	Emeryson-Aston Martin	
	(United Kingdom) Bob Gerard	Cooper-Bristol	
	(United Kingdom) Tony Crook	Cooper-Bristol	
	(United Kingdom) Ron Flockhart	Connaught-Lea Francis	

Previous race: 1953 RedeX Trophy	Formula One non-championship races 1953 season	Next race: 1953 Modena Grand Prix
Previous race: —	London Trophy	Next race: 1954 London Trophy
