= 1952 British Grand Prix =

← Previous race	Next race →
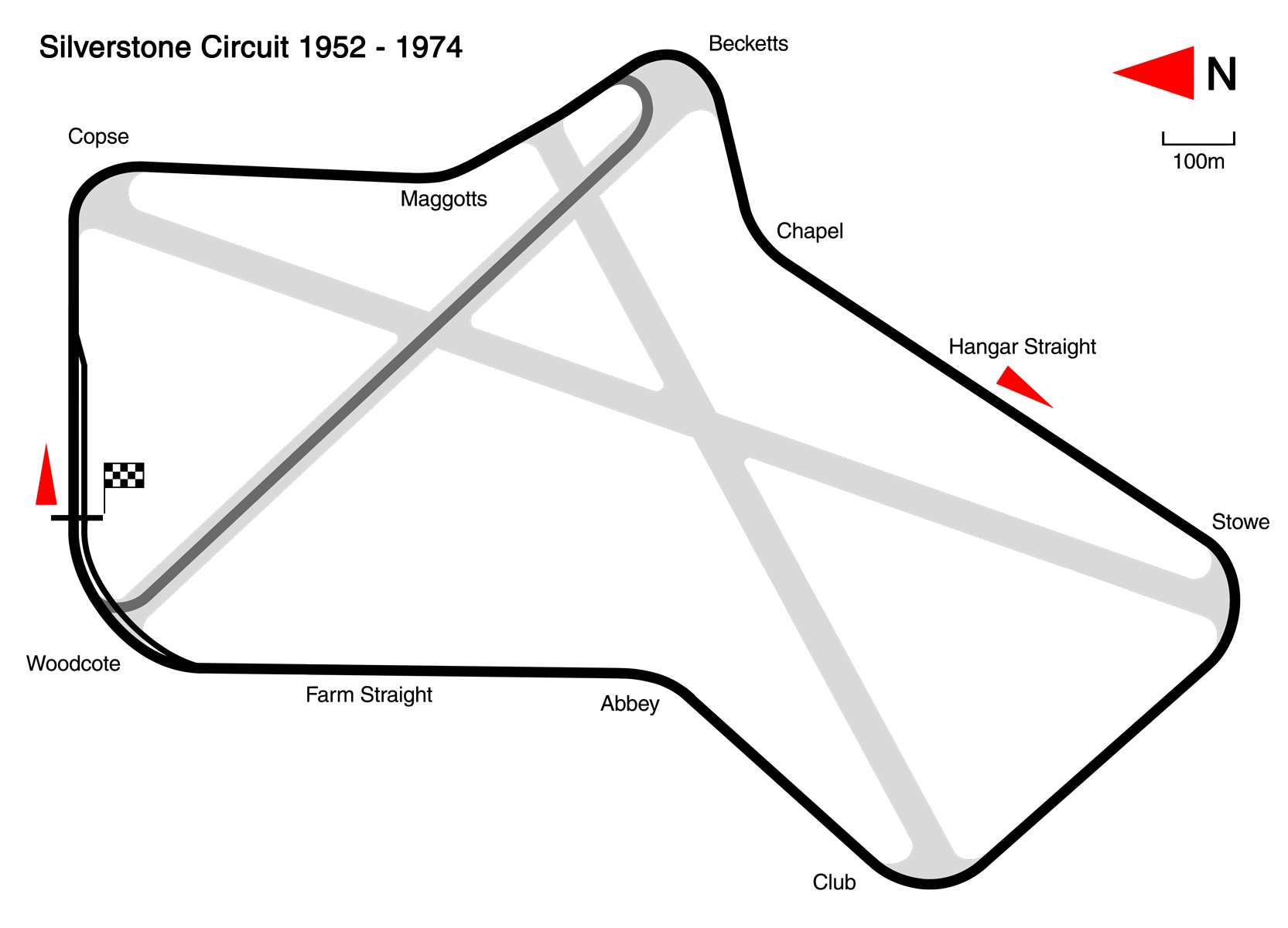
- Silverstone Circuit in 1952–1973 configuration

Race details
- Date: 19 July 1952
- Official name: 5th RAC British Grand Prix
- Location: Silverstone Circuit; Silverstone, England
- Course: Permanent racing facility
- Course length: 4.7105 km (2.927 miles)
- Distance: 85 laps, 400.307 km (248.739 miles)
- Weather: Overcast, dry.
- Attendance: 100,000 (estimate)

Pole position
Driver	(Italy) Nino Farina	Ferrari
- Time: 1:50.0

Fastest lap
Driver	(Italy) Alberto Ascari	Ferrari
- Time: 1:52.0

Podium
First	(Italy) Alberto Ascari	Ferrari
Second	(Italy) Piero Taruffi	Ferrari
Third	(United Kingdom) Mike Hawthorn	Cooper-Bristol

The 1952 British Grand Prix was a Formula Two race held on 19 July 1952 at Silverstone Circuit. It was race 5 of 8 in the 1952 World Championship of Drivers, in which each Grand Prix was run to Formula Two rules rather than the Formula One regulations normally used.

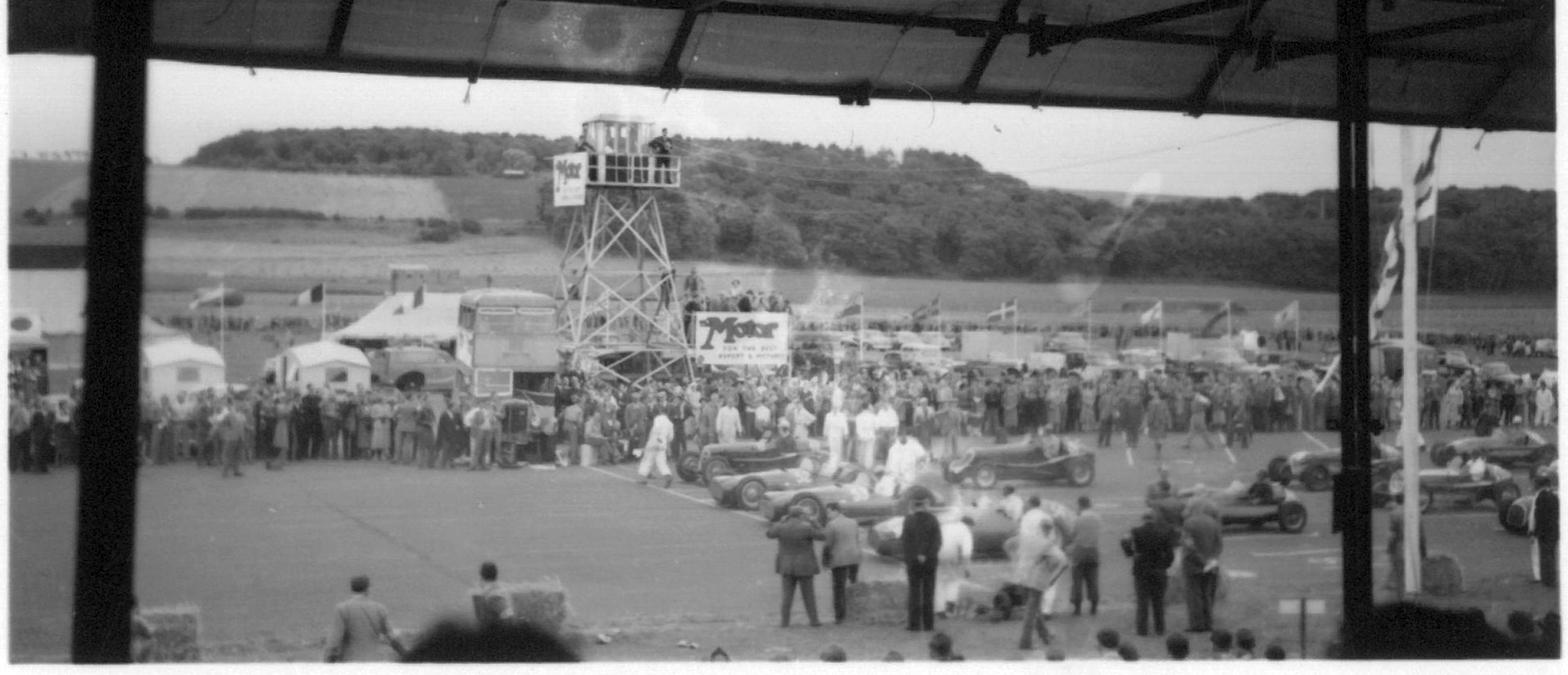
Photo from Grandstand

New pit facilities had been built on the straight between Woodcote and Copse corners; the original pits were located between Abbey and Woodcote.

== Report ==
Jean Behra was unable to take part in the British Grand Prix, having broken his shoulder blade at the non-championship Grand Prix de Sables d'Olonne the previous weekend. Consequently, Maurice Trintignant took over Behra's Gordini T16 for Silverstone, having driven a Simca-Gordini T15 at Rouen-Les-Essarts. The Gordini team also fielded regular drivers Robert Manzon and Prince Bira. As in the previous race, Belgian driver Johnny Claes entered a privateer Simca-Gordini under the 'Ecurie Belge' moniker. Ferrari stuck with the same three drivers — Alberto Ascari, Nino Farina and Piero Taruffi — who had monopolised the podium positions at the French Grand Prix. There were also a number of privateer Ferrari entrants: Fischer and Hirt for Ecurie Espadon, Peter Whitehead and Roy Salvadori. HWM continued their policy of partnering regulars Peter Collins and Lance Macklin with a local driver, in this case Duncan Hamilton. The Connaught team ran a quartet of Lea Francis-engined entries — McAlpine, Downing, Thompson and Poore — while the remainder of the grid was made up of a series of privateers of various constructors, including Coopers and Maseratis.

The three works Ferraris, led on this occasion by Farina, again qualified in the top three positions on the grid, this time being joined on the four-car front row by Manzon. The second row consisted of Downing alongside Reg Parnell and Mike Hawthorn in a pair of Cooper-Bristols. The Connaughts of Poore and Thompson shared row three with Bira's Gordini and Hamilton in his HWM.

Ascari took the lead at the start of the race and held onto it for the whole 85 laps, taking his third consecutive victory in the World Championship. Polesitter Nino Farina was in second place for the first 26 laps but he dropped down the field when he needed to pit to change spark plugs, eventually finishing in sixth, just outside the points. Despite making a bad start that saw him drop to ninth by the end of the first lap, fellow Ferrari driver Taruffi recovered to take second place, finishing a lap behind Ascari. Dennis Poore, who had been running in third after Farina's pit stop, needed to make a stop of his own in order to refuel his car. This allowed Hawthorn to inherit third place, which he held for the remainder of the race. He finished a lap behind Taruffi and took his first World Championship podium in just his third race. Poore took fourth, ahead of Connaught teammate Eric Thompson in the fifth and final points position.

Ascari's win, coupled with yet another fastest lap, allowed him to extend his lead in the Drivers' Championship once again. He now enjoyed an eight-point lead over fellow Ferrari driver Taruffi. Farina, having not scored any points, was seven points adrift of Taruffi.

== Entries ==
No	Driver	Entrant	Constructor	Chassis	Engine	Tyre
1	(United Kingdom) Graham Whitehead	Peter Whitehead	Alta	Alta F2	Alta F2 2.0 L4	D
2	(United Kingdom) Bill Aston	W.S. Aston	Aston Butterworth	Aston NB41	Aston Butterworth F4 2.0 F4	D
3	(United Kingdom) Kenneth McAlpine	Connaught Engineering	Connaught-Lea Francis	Connaught A	Lea Francis 2.0 L4	D
4	(United Kingdom) Ken Downing	Connaught Engineering	Connaught-Lea Francis	Connaught A	Lea Francis 2.0 L4	D
5	(United Kingdom) Eric Thompson	Connaught Engineering	Connaught-Lea Francis	Connaught A	Lea Francis 2.0 L4	D
6	(United Kingdom) Dennis Poore	Connaught Engineering	Connaught-Lea Francis	Connaught A	Lea Francis 2.0 L4	D
7	(United Kingdom) David Murray	Ecurie Ecosse	Cooper-Bristol	Cooper T20	Bristol BS1 2.0 L6	D
8	(United Kingdom) Reg Parnell	AHM Bryde	Cooper-Bristol	Cooper T20	Bristol BS1 2.0 L6	D
9	(United Kingdom) Mike Hawthorn	Leslie D. Hawthorn	Cooper-Bristol	Cooper T20	Bristol BS1 2.0 L6	D
10	(United Kingdom) Eric Brandon	Ecurie Richmond	Cooper-Bristol	Cooper T20	Bristol BS1 2.0 L6	D
11	(United Kingdom) Alan Brown	Ecurie Richmond	Cooper-Bristol	Cooper T20	Bristol BS1 2.0 L6	D
12	(United Kingdom) Stirling Moss	English Racing Automobiles Ltd.	ERA-Bristol	ERA G	Bristol BS1 2.0 L6	D
14	(United Kingdom) Roy Salvadori^{1}	G. Caprara	Ferrari	Ferrari 500	Ferrari Type 500 2.0 L4	D
15	(Italy) Alberto Ascari	Scuderia Ferrari	Ferrari	Ferrari 500	Ferrari Type 500 2.0 L4	P
16	(Italy) Nino Farina	Scuderia Ferrari	Ferrari	Ferrari 500	Ferrari Type 500 2.0 L4	P
17	(Italy) Piero Taruffi	Scuderia Ferrari	Ferrari	Ferrari 500	Ferrari Type 500 2.0 L4	P
18	(France) Louis Rosier^{2}	Ecurie Rosier	Ferrari	Ferrari 500	Ferrari Type 500 2.0 L4	D
19	(Switzerland) Rudi Fischer	Ecurie Espadon	Ferrari	Ferrari 500	Ferrari Type 500 2.0 L4	P
20	(Switzerland) Peter Hirt	Ecurie Espadon	Ferrari	Ferrari 212	Ferrari 166 2.0 V12	P
21	(United Kingdom) Peter Whitehead	Peter Whitehead	Ferrari	Ferrari 125	Ferrari 166 2.0 V12	D
22	(United Kingdom) Ken Wharton^{2}	Scuderia Franera	Frazer Nash-Bristol	Frazer Nash FN48	Bristol BS1 2.0 L6	D
23	(United Kingdom) Tony Crook	Tony Crook	Frazer Nash-BMW	Frazer Nash 421	BMW 328 2.0 L6	D
24	(France) Robert Manzon	Equipe Gordini	Gordini	Gordini T16	Gordini 20 2.0 L6	E
25	(France) Maurice Trintignant	Equipe Gordini	Gordini	Gordini T16	Gordini 20 2.0 L6	E
26	(Thailand) Prince Bira	Equipe Gordini	Gordini	Gordini T16	Gordini 20 2.0 L6	E
27	(Belgium) Johnny Claes	Ecurie Belge	Simca-Gordini	Simca-Gordini T15	Gordini 1500 1.5 L4	E
28	(Australia) Tony Gaze	Tony Gaze	HWM-Alta	HWM 52	Alta F2 2.0 L4	D
29	(United Kingdom) Peter Collins	HW Motors	HWM-Alta	HWM 52	Alta F2 2.0 L4	D
30	(United Kingdom) Duncan Hamilton	HW Motors	HWM-Alta	HWM 52	Alta F2 2.0 L4	D
31	(United Kingdom) Lance Macklin	HW Motors	HWM-Alta	HWM 52	Alta F2 2.0 L4	D
32	(Switzerland) Toulo de Graffenried	Enrico Platé	Maserati-Platé	Maserati 4CLT-48	Platé 2.0 L4	P
33	(United States) Harry Schell	Enrico Platé	Maserati-Platé	Maserati 4CLT-48	Platé 2.0 L4	P
34	(Brazil) Gino Bianco	Escuderia Bandeirantes	Maserati	Maserati A6GCM	Maserati A6G 2.0 L6	P
35	(Uruguay) Eitel Cantoni	Escuderia Bandeirantes	Maserati	Maserati A6GCM	Maserati A6G 2.0 L6	P

^1 — Roy Salvadori qualified and drove the entire race in the #14 Ferrari. Bobbie Baird, named substitute driver for the car, was not used during the Grand Prix.
^2 — Louis Rosier and Ken Wharton both withdrew from the event prior to practice.

== Classification ==
=== Qualifying ===
Pos	No	Driver	Constructor	Time	Gap
1	16	(Italy) Nino Farina	Ferrari	1:50	–
2	15	(Italy) Alberto Ascari	Ferrari	1:50	+ 0
3	17	(Italy) Piero Taruffi	Ferrari	1:53	+ 3
4	24	(France) Robert Manzon	Gordini	1:55	+ 5
5	4	(United Kingdom) Ken Downing	Connaught-Lea Francis	1:56	+ 6
6	8	(United Kingdom) Reg Parnell	Cooper-Bristol	1:56	+ 6
7	9	(United Kingdom) Mike Hawthorn	Cooper-Bristol	1:56	+ 6
8	6	(United Kingdom) Dennis Poore	Connaught-Lea Francis	1:56	+ 6
9	5	(United Kingdom) Eric Thompson	Connaught-Lea Francis	1:57	+ 7
10	26	(Thailand) Prince Bira	Gordini	1:57	+ 7
11	30	(United Kingdom) Duncan Hamilton	HWM-Alta	1:57	+ 7
12	1	(United Kingdom) Graham Whitehead	Alta	1:58	+ 8
13	11	(United Kingdom) Alan Brown	Cooper-Bristol	1:58	+ 8
14	29	(United Kingdom) Peter Collins	HWM-Alta	1:58	+ 8
15	19	(Switzerland) Rudi Fischer	Ferrari	1:58	+ 8
16	12	(United Kingdom) Stirling Moss	ERA-Bristol	1:59	+ 9
17	3	(United Kingdom) Kenneth McAlpine	Connaught-Lea Francis	2:00	+ 10
18	10	(United Kingdom) Eric Brandon	Cooper-Bristol	2:00	+ 10
19	14	(United Kingdom) Roy Salvadori	Ferrari	2:00	+ 10
20	21	(United Kingdom) Peter Whitehead	Ferrari	2:00	+ 10
21	25	(France) Maurice Trintignant	Gordini	2:00	+ 10
22	7	(United Kingdom) David Murray	Cooper-Bristol	2:02	+ 12
23	27	(Belgium) Johnny Claes	Simca-Gordini-Gordini	2:02	+ 12
24	20	(Switzerland) Peter Hirt	Ferrari	2:03	+ 13
25	23	(United Kingdom) Tony Crook	Frazer Nash-BMW	2:03	+ 13
26	28	(Australia) Tony Gaze	HWM-Alta	2:05	+ 15
27	35	(Uruguay) Eitel Cantoni	Maserati	2:06	+ 16
28	34	(Brazil) Gino Bianco	Maserati	2:07	+ 17
29	31	(United Kingdom) Lance Macklin	HWM-Alta	2:08	+ 18
30	2	(United Kingdom) Bill Aston	Aston Butterworth	3:28	+ 1:38
31	32	(Switzerland) Toulo de Graffenried	Maserati-Platé	No time	–
32	33	(United States) Harry Schell	Maserati-Platé	No time	–

=== Race ===
Pos	No	Driver	Constructor	Laps	Time/Retired	Grid	Points
1	15	(Italy) Alberto Ascari	Ferrari	85	2:46:11	2	9^{1}
2	17	(Italy) Piero Taruffi	Ferrari	84	+1 lap	3	6
3	9	(United Kingdom) Mike Hawthorn	Cooper-Bristol	83	+2 laps	7	4
4	6	(United Kingdom) Dennis Poore	Connaught-Lea Francis	83	+2 laps	8	3
5	5	(United Kingdom) Eric Thompson	Connaught-Lea Francis	82	+3 laps	9	2
6	16	(Italy) Nino Farina	Ferrari	82	+3 laps	1	
7	8	(United Kingdom) Reg Parnell	Cooper-Bristol	82	+3 laps	6	
8	14	(United Kingdom) Roy Salvadori	Ferrari	82	+3 laps	19	
9	4	(United Kingdom) Ken Downing	Connaught-Lea Francis	82	+3 laps	5	
10	21	(United Kingdom) Peter Whitehead	Ferrari	81	+4 laps	20	
11	26	(Thailand) Prince Bira	Gordini	81	+4 laps	10	
12	1	(United Kingdom) Graham Whitehead	Alta	80	+5 laps	12	
13	19	(Switzerland) Rudi Fischer	Ferrari	80	+5 laps	15	
14	27	(Belgium) Johnny Claes	Simca-Gordini-Gordini	79	+6 laps	23	
15	31	(United Kingdom) Lance Macklin	HWM-Alta	79	+6 laps	29	
16	3	(United Kingdom) Kenneth McAlpine	Connaught-Lea Francis	79	+6 laps	17	
17	33	(United States) Harry Schell	Maserati-Platé	78	+7 laps	32	
18	34	(Brazil) Gino Bianco	Maserati	77	+8 laps	28	
19	32	(Switzerland) Toulo de Graffenried	Maserati-Platé	76	+9 laps	31	
20	10	(United Kingdom) Eric Brandon	Cooper-Bristol	76	+9 laps	18	
21	23	(United Kingdom) Tony Crook	Frazer Nash-BMW	75	+10 laps	25	
22	11	(United Kingdom) Alan Brown	Cooper-Bristol	69	+16 laps	13	
Ret	29	(United Kingdom) Peter Collins	HWM-Alta	73	Ignition	14	
Ret	30	(United Kingdom) Duncan Hamilton	HWM-Alta	44	Engine	11	
Ret	12	(United Kingdom) Stirling Moss	ERA-Bristol	36	Engine	16	
Ret	25	(France) Maurice Trintignant	Gordini	21	Gearbox	21	
Ret	28	(Australia) Tony Gaze	HWM-Alta	19	Engine	26	
Ret	7	(United Kingdom) David Murray	Cooper-Bristol	14	Engine	22	
Ret	24	(France) Robert Manzon	Gordini	9	Clutch	4	
Ret	20	(Switzerland) Peter Hirt	Ferrari	3	Brakes	24	
Ret	35	(Uruguay) Eitel Cantoni	Maserati	0	Brakes	27	
DNS	2	(United Kingdom) Bill Aston	Aston Butterworth	0	Non Starter		

Notes

- ^1 – Includes 1 point for fastest lap

== Championship standings after the race ==
Drivers' Championship standings

Pos	Driver	Points
1	(Italy) Alberto Ascari	27
2	(Italy) Piero Taruffi	19
3	(Italy) Nino Farina	12
4	(United States) Troy Ruttman	8
5	(France) Robert Manzon	7

- Note: Only the top five positions are included. Only the best 4 results counted towards the Championship.

Previous race: 1952 French Grand Prix	FIA Formula One World Championship; 1952 season	Next race: 1952 German Grand Prix
Previous race: 1951 British Grand Prix	British Grand Prix	Next race: 1953 British Grand Prix
