= Robin Montgomerie-Charrington =

British racing driver (1915–2007)

- Born: 23 June 1915; Mayfair, London, England
- Died: 3 April 2007 (aged 91)

Formula One World Championship career
- Nationality: (United Kingdom) British
- Active years: 1952
- Team: privateer Aston Butterworth
- Entries: 1
- Championships: 0
- Wins: 0
- Podiums: 0
- Career points: 0
- Pole positions: 0
- Fastest laps: 0
- First entry: 1952 Belgian Grand Prix

Robin Victor Campbell Montgomerie-Charrington (born Montgomerie; 23 June 1915 – 3 April 2007) was a British racing driver from England.

== Biography ==
Montgomerie-Charrington was born in Mayfair, the son of Maj. Robert Victor Campbell Montgomerie and Mildred Mary Bellasis. He was the grandson of Rear-Admiral Robert Archibald James Montgomerie.

Montgomerie-Charrington took up 500cc Formula 3 in 1950, achieving modest results through '50 and '51. He participated in one Formula One World Championship Grand Prix, the European Grand Prix at Spa, Belgium, on 22 June 1952. He retired his Aston Butterworth with "engine trouble" after 17 laps and scored no World Championship points.

Montgomerie-Charrington later emigrated to the United States.

== Complete Formula One World Championship results ==
(key)

Year	Entrant	Chassis	Engine	1	2	3	4	5	6	7	8	WDC	Points
1952	Robin Montgomerie-Charrington	Aston Butterworth	Flat-4	SUI	500	BEL; Ret	FRA	GBR	GER	NED	ITA	NC	0

== See also ==
- Bill Aston
