= Bill Aston =

British racing driver (1900–1974)

William "Bill" Aston
- Born: 29 March 1900; Hopton, Staffordshire, England, UK
- Died: 4 March 1974 (aged 73); Lingfield, Surrey, England, UK

Formula One World Championship career
- Nationality: (United Kingdom) British
- Active years: 1952
- Team: Aston Butterworth
- Entries: 3 (1 start)
- Championships: 0
- Wins: 0
- Podiums: 0
- Career points: 0
- Pole positions: 0
- Fastest laps: 0
- First entry: 1952 British Grand Prix
- Last entry: 1952 Italian Grand Prix

William Simpson Aston (29 March 1900 – 4 March 1974) was a British racing driver who participated in three World Championship Grands Prix, in 1952 when the championship was run to Formula Two rules, for his own team Aston Butterworth.

== Career ==
Prior to taking part in World Championship Grand Prix racing, Aston was a test pilot and motorcycle racer. He turned to four-wheel racing with a Cooper-JAP in Formula Three and later graduated into Formula Two. He came close to winning a heat race at Chimay in 1951, driving an 1,100 cc (67 cu in) Cooper, but his car failed on the last lap. In the same year he set a 500 cc (31 cu in) world speed record at Montlhéry in the streamlined Cooper, fitted with a V-twin J.A.P. motor.

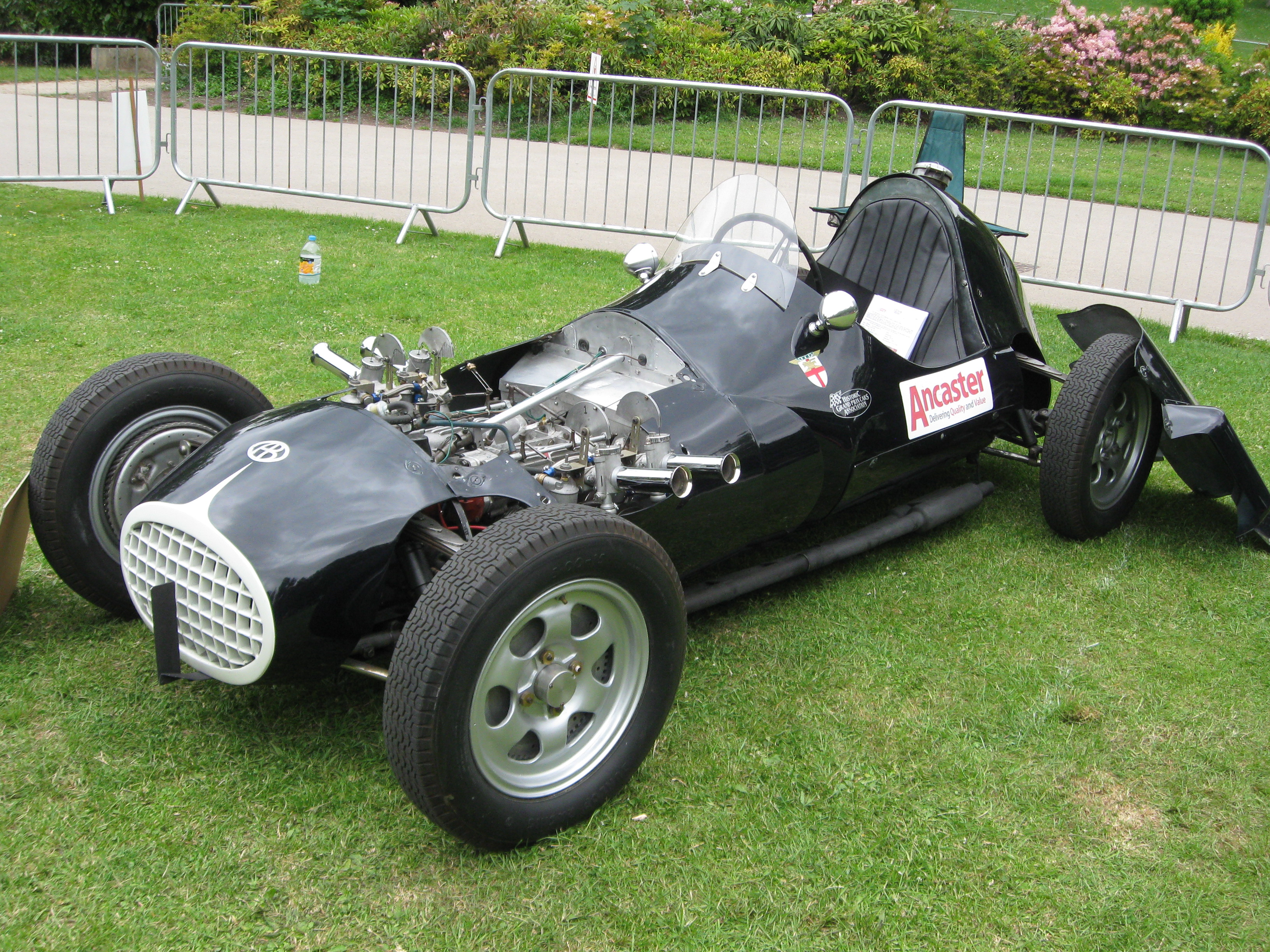
Aston Butterworth NB42 displayed at Motor Sport at the Palace Crystal Palace circuit, 25 May 2015

For 1952, Aston teamed up with Archie Butterworth to build the Aston Butterworth, a car that raced quite well, but was unfortunately very unreliable. He entered the car in the British Grand Prix and qualified 30th and last. However, he was unable to start the race. He then entered the 1952 German Grand Prix, but his car failed on the second lap. At the Italian Grand Prix he failed to make it through qualifying. Aston raced on into his 60s, with a Mini and a Jaguar, before he retired.

== Racing record ==
=== Complete Formula One World Championship results ===
(key)

Year	Entrant	Chassis	Engine	1	2	3	4	5	6	7	8	WDC	Points
1952	W S Aston	Aston NB 41	Butterworth Flat 4	SUI	500	BEL	FRA	GBR; DNS	GER; Ret	NED	ITA; DNQ	NC	0

=== Complete British Saloon Car Championship results ===
(key) (Races in bold indicate pole position; races in italics indicate fastest lap.)

Year	Team	Car	Class	1	2	3	4	5	6	7	8	9	10	11	DC	Pts	Class
1960	Star Hill Racing Equipe	Jaguar Mk II 3.4		BRH	SNE	MAL	OUL	SNE	BRH; 6*	BRH; 4*	BRH; 2*				NC*	0*	
1961	Bill Aston	Morris Mini Minor	A	SNE	GOO ?	AIN ?	SIL ?	CRY; Ret	SIL; 5	BRH ?	OUL	SNE			10th	20	**3rd**
1962	Tourist Trophy Garage	Vauxhall VX4/90	B	SNE	GOO	AIN	SIL	CRY	AIN; 21	BRH ?	OUL ?				18th	8	6th
1963	Team Tourist Trophy	Jaguar Mk II 3.8	D	SNE; 4	OUL; Ret	GOO; 5	AIN	SIL	CRY; 5†	SIL	BRH	BRH	OUL	SNE	40th	2	15th

† Events with 2 races staged for the different classes.

- Car over 1000cc - Not eligible for points.

== See also ==
- Robin Montgomerie-Charrington
