= Aston Butterworth =

British motor racing team

(United Kingdom) Aston Butterworth
- Founded: 1952
- Founder(s): Bill Aston; Archie Butterworth
- Folded: 1954
- Base: United Kingdom
- Team principal(s): Bill Aston
- Former series: World Drivers' Championship
- Noted drivers: (United Kingdom) Bill Aston (United Kingdom) Robin Montgomerie-Charrington
- Teams' Championships: 0
- Drivers' Championships: 0

Aston Butterworth was a Formula Two constructor from the United Kingdom, which competed in the seasons 1952 and 1953 when the World Drivers' Championship was run to Formula Two regulations. The team participated in four World Championship Grands Prix.

The project was instigated by Bill Aston, who decided to build a car for Formula Two. The chassis was a copy of a Formula Two Cooper, fitted with a flat-four engine devised by Archie Butterworth. The car made its debut in April 1952 in the Lavant Cup at Goodwood, finishing eighth with Aston at the wheel. In May, a second car was added, driven by Robin Montgomerie-Charrington, who achieved the team's best finish, a third place at Chimay in June. This car was designated NB42 and as of May 2015 was in its original specification.

Aston entered the car, fitted with Allard-Steyr cylinder heads and a new carburettor, in the 1952 German Grand Prix. He withdrew on lap two after losing oil pressure. Aston continued to appear in races throughout the 1953 season, but there was never enough money to develop the program properly. A major problem was the supply of fuel - the Aston Butterworth sometimes had fuel starvation, and sometimes caught on fire. When the new F1 regulations came in 1954, Aston-Butterworth ceased participating.

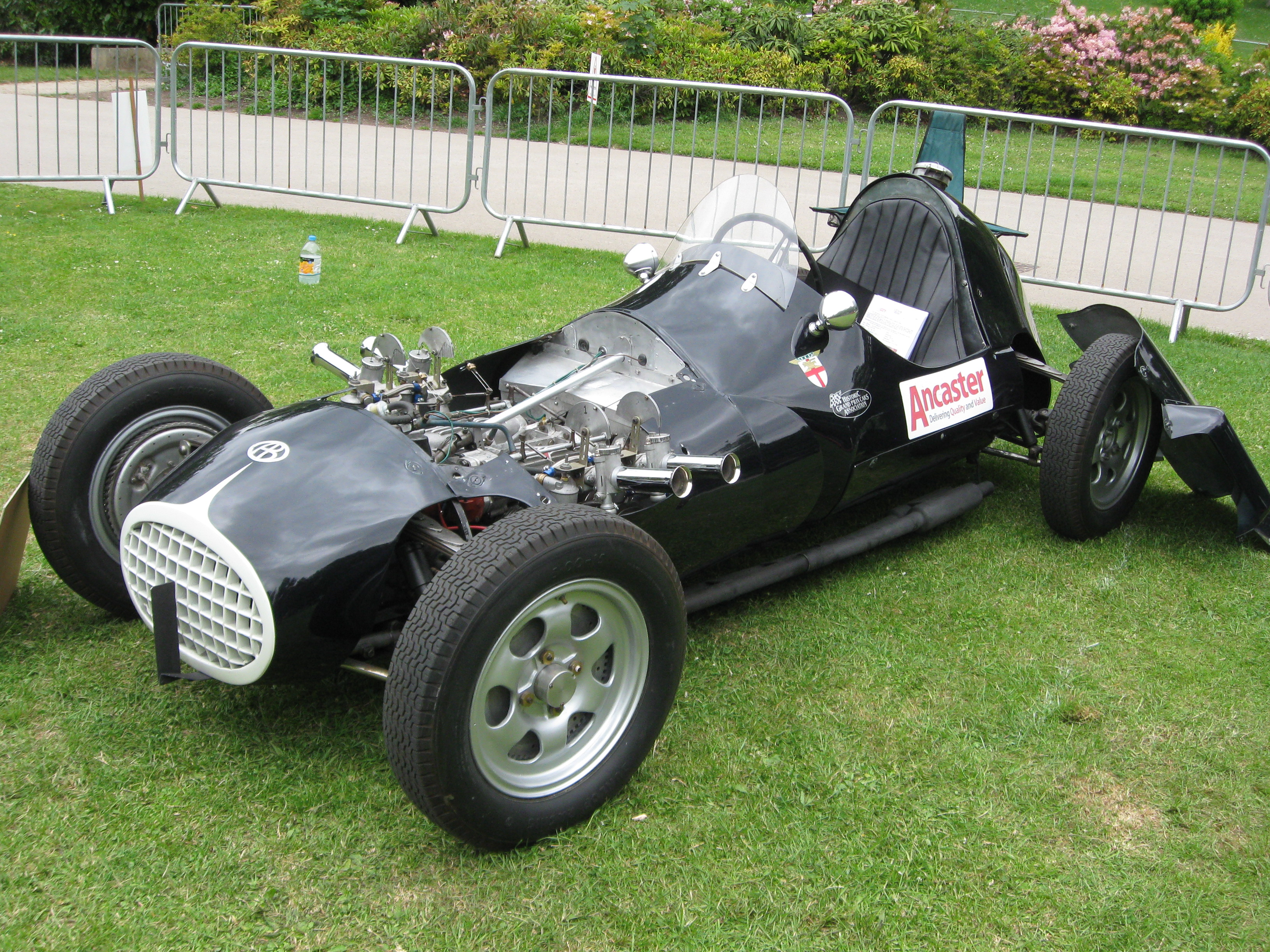
Aston Butterworth NB42 displayed at Motor Sport at the Palace Crystal Palace circuit, 25 May 2015

== Complete World Championship results ==
(key)

| Year | Chassis | Engine | Tyres | Driver | 1 | 2 | 3 | 4 | 5 | 6 | 7 | 8 |
|---|---|---|---|---|---|---|---|---|---|---|---|---|
| 1952 | Aston NB42 | Butterworth F4 | Dunlop | | SUI | 500 | BEL | FRA | GBR | GER | NED | ITA |
| 1952 | Aston NB42 | Butterworth F4 | Dunlop | (United Kingdom) Robin Montgomerie-Charrington | | | Ret | | | | | |
| 1952 | Aston NB41 | Butterworth F4 | Dunlop | (United Kingdom) Bill Aston | | | | | DNS | Ret | | DNQ |
