= Hersham and Walton Motors =

British motoring brand

HWM
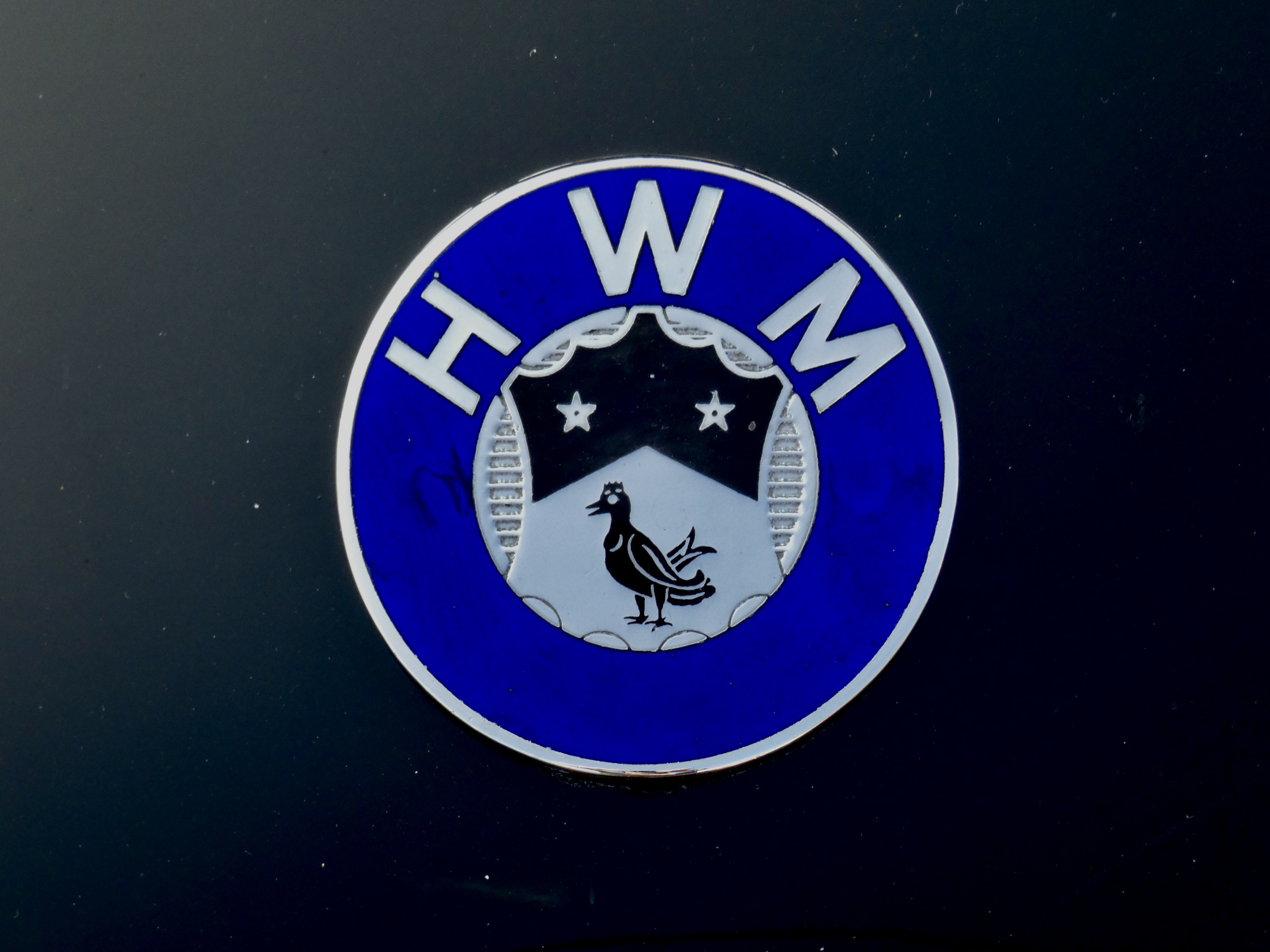
- Full name: Hersham and Walton Motors
- Base: Walton on Thames, UK
- Founder(s): John Heath

Formula One World Championship career
- First entry: 1951 Swiss Grand Prix
- Races entered: 14
- Engines: Alta
- Race victories: 0
- Points: 2
- Pole positions: 0
- Fastest laps: 0
- Final entry: 1954 French Grand Prix

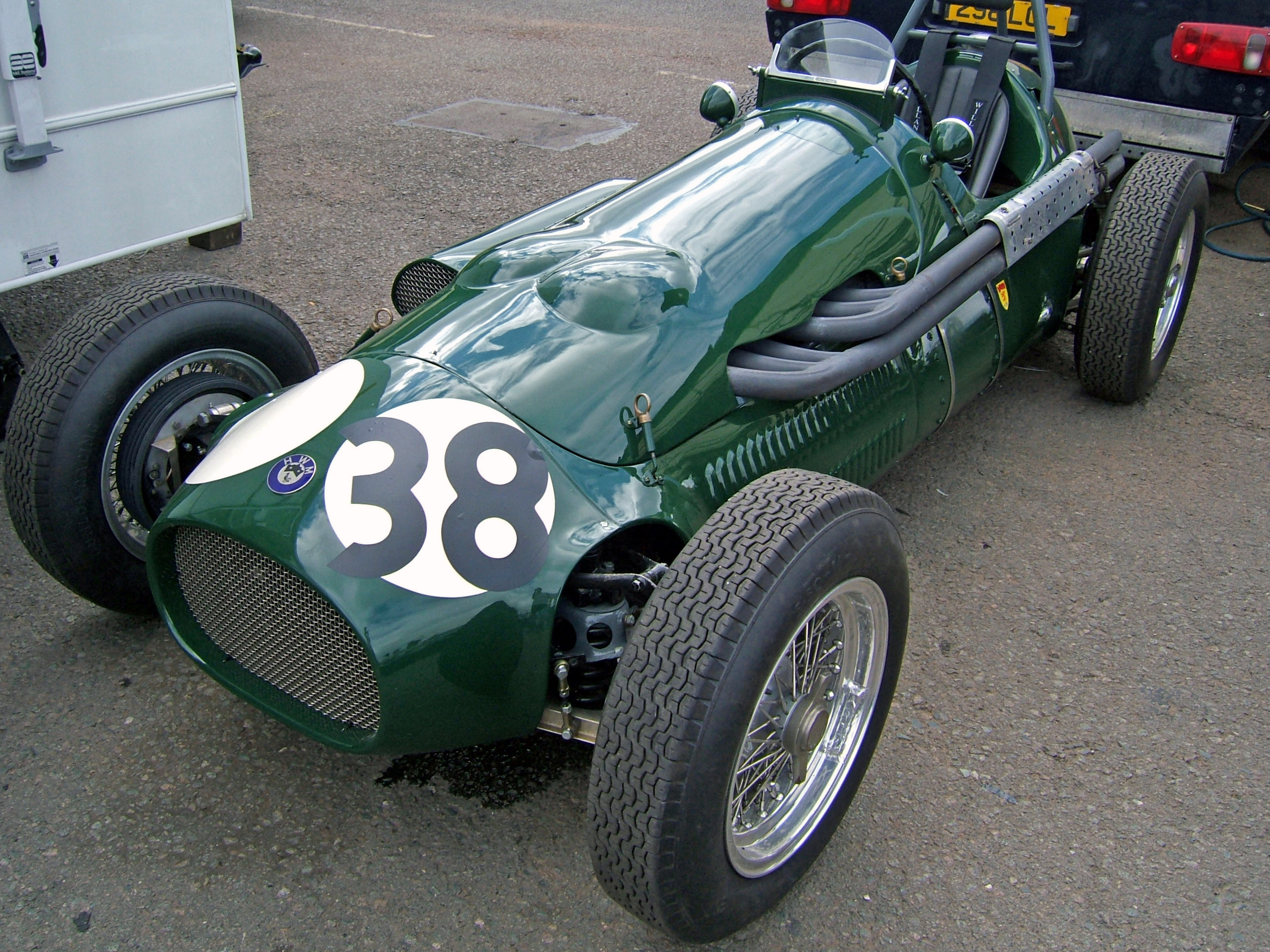
A 1952 HWM Formula Two car

Hersham and Walton Motors (HWM) is the world's longest established Aston Martin business, having acquired the franchise in 1951. As a racing car constructor, HWM competed in Formula One and Formula Two, and in sports car racing.

== Motor racing ==
Hersham and Walton Motors was founded in 1938 by John Heath, an excellent race driver and talented engineer. Heath was joined by George Abecassis in 1946. Together, they moved the business into a building based on New Zealand Avenue in Walton on Thames which was previously used by Vickers during the war as part of their aircraft construction facility.

George Abecassis and John Heath went racing together from 1946 and in 1948 they built a streamlined sports racing car on the chassis of a Sports Alta, and thus embarked upon the construction of racing cars and racing sports cars at the Walton-on-Thames works. The 1948 car gave them encouraging results and so new car, this time called an HW-Alta, was constructed and raced in 1949; this car was sufficiently successful to convince the partners to embark upon building a full team of cars for the 1950 Formula Two season of British and continental events: these cars were known as HWMs.

They were the first British team to find international success after WW2 which is almost forgotten. The operated with a very limited budget from their little garage in Walton-on-Thames. Over HWM's seven-year life as a racing car manufacturer less than two dozen were built, but some 70 per cent of the entire production survives today.

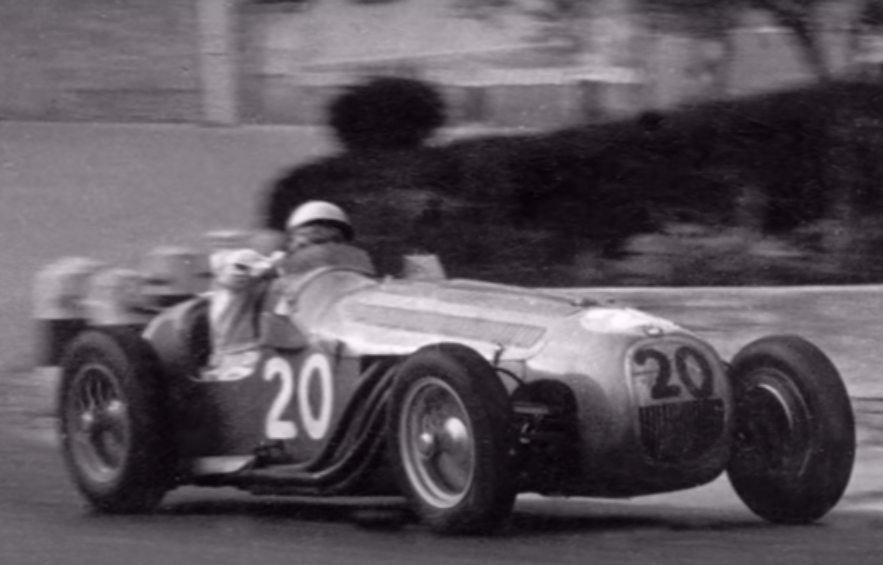
Stirling Moss at the 1950 Circuito del Garda

The HWM leadership had a knack for spotting young talent. The list of drivers that raced for the team including Duncan Hamilton, Peter Collins, Harry Schell, Lance Macklin and Paul Frère but perhaps the most famous was Stirling Moss. Before driving for HWM, Stirling was a privateer racing a Cooper. He was offered his first professional drive at HWM and went on to race for the team for nearly two years. His talent helped the team to gain impressive results.

The HWM's four-cylinder Alta engine lacked the power of most of its rivals, but its all-independent chassis handled well, and Stirling's budding genius exploited it to the full. He finished third at Reims behind Ascari's Ferrari and Simon's Gordini, and, unbelievably, third in the F1 race at Bari behind the 159 Alfas of Farina and Fangio. He set fastest lap in the Rome Grand Prix chasing the F2 Ferraris of Ascari and Villoresi, and was leading the Naples Grand Prix when he was pushed off into a tree by a backmarker. Johnny Claes, meanwhile, scored the first post-war win by a British car in a race titled as a Grand Prix when he won the Belgian Grand Prix des Frontières at Chimay, while Lance Macklin was sixth in the German Grand Prix and Rudi Fischer was sixth at Berne.

In between, bent cars and blown engines were repaired. The hard-pressed transporters frequently broke down, one of the racers caught fire the night before a race, and one of the mechanics, plus car and van, got lost in the middle of Italy, without money and unable to speak Italian. But the team made it to the end of the season, and had built substantial reputation across Europe. The three cars were sold off after the last race at a profit.

Of those three 1950 works cars, one has remained in its Alta-engined form. Another was given a Jaguar XK120 engine by its new owner Oscar Moore, becoming the first in a long line of Jaguar-powered specialist sports-racers. The third was sent to Hollywood, starring in a movie with Kirk Douglas. Following production, it was installed with a Chevrolet V8 engine, racing for the second time on the USA's West Coast as the Stovebolt Special. As of 2022, all three were owned by collectors in England.

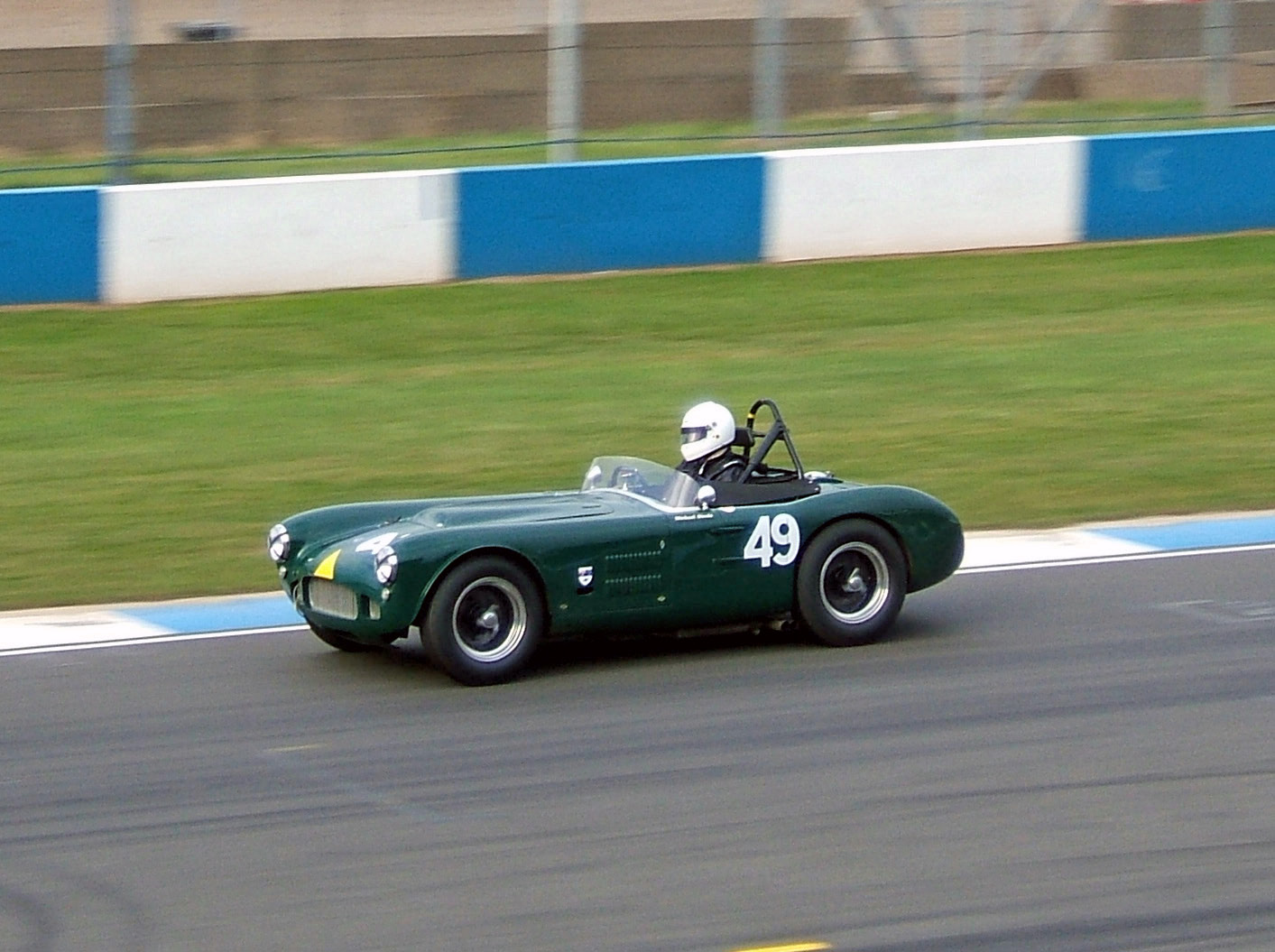
HWM sports car

From 1950 to 1952, HWM achieved remarkable success in Formula Two for a team that was run on very little money and yet which faced the might of continental marques in every race. By 1953 they were outclassed, but when the international Formula changed in 1954, John Heath constructed a works car to compete in Formula One. Right from the first event, the non-championship Lavant Cup at Goodwood, the new car proved to be off the pace. It retired from the BRDC International Trophy and then came its World Championship debut at the French Grand Prix at Reims-Gueux. Macklin qualified a whole 23 seconds behind Juan Manuel Fangio and was running last when the engine failed. With that, HWM abandoned their Formula One programme.

Meanwhile, the first Jaguar-engined HWM sports racing car had appeared in 1953, and this had some success with Abecassis at the wheel. From then on until 1957, the team was involved in sports car racing both in Britain and on the continent, sometimes beating their Jaguar and Aston Martin Works competitors. After John Heath was killed on the 1956 Mille Miglia in Italy in an HWM Works car, Abecassis did not wish to continue and the works racing programme continued for just a year.

== Motor trade ==
In 1950 George Abecassis had won his class at Le Mans in an Aston Martin DB2 with co-driver Lance Macklin. This cemented George's relationship with Aston Martin and the following year HWM was awarded the Aston Martin franchise. It remains an Aston Martin dealership to this day. Having been extremely impressed by Lance Macklin's driving performance at Le Mans, George also secured Lance for the HWM team. Lance went on to be one HWM's most loyal drivers.

In 1958, Mike Harting arrived at HWM as a partner to George Abecassis. He had previously been the global sales manager for Aston Martin at their Feltham facility five miles away from the Walton dealership.

One of those contacts was George Abecassis. George had been running the business on his own since the death of John Heath but was keeping an eye out for a suitable partner. As an Aston Martin Works racing driver, George had struck up a relationship with Mike Harting. It became apparent that there was potential to work together. Mike wanted a career that required him to travel less and therefore see more of his family. The HWM business looked like an attractive option so the deal was agreed and they joined forces.

Eventually when George retired, Mike took ownership of the whole of the HWM business and continued at the helm, later joined by his son Andrew, through the rest of his life.

HWM is today owned by Andrew Harting and the Harting family along with Guy Jenner. HWM trades as HWM Aston Martin and HWM Sports Cars and is an Aston Martin and Sports Cars dealership. It is the oldest Aston Martin dealership in the world.

== Formula One World Championship results ==
=== Works entries ===
(key) (results in bold indicate pole position; results in italics indicate fastest lap)

Year	Chassis	Engine	Tyres	Driver	1	2	3	4	5	6	7	8	9
1951	HWM 51	Alta 2.0 L4	D		SUI	500	BEL	FRA	GBR	GER	ITA	ESP	
1951	HWM 51	Alta 2.0 L4	D	(United Kingdom) George Abecassis	Ret								
1951	HWM 51	Alta 2.0 L4	D	(United Kingdom) Stirling Moss	8								
1952	HWM 51; HWM 52	Alta 2.0 L4	D		SUI	500	BEL	FRA	GBR	GER	NED	ITA	
1952	HWM 51; HWM 52	Alta 2.0 L4	D	(United Kingdom) George Abecassis	Ret								
1952	HWM 51; HWM 52	Alta 2.0 L4	D	(United Kingdom) Peter Collins	Ret		Ret	6	Ret	DNS		DNQ	
1952	HWM 51; HWM 52	Alta 2.0 L4	D	(United Kingdom) Lance Macklin	Ret		11	9	15		8	DNQ	
1952	HWM 51; HWM 52	Alta 2.0 L4	D	(United Kingdom) Stirling Moss	Ret								
1952	HWM 51; HWM 52	Alta 2.0 L4	D	(Belgium) Paul Frère			5			Ret			
1952	HWM 51; HWM 52	Alta 2.0 L4	D	(Belgium) Roger Laurent			12						
1952	HWM 51; HWM 52	Alta 2.0 L4	D	(France) Yves Giraud-Cabantous				10					
1952	HWM 51; HWM 52	Alta 2.0 L4	D	(United Kingdom) Duncan Hamilton					Ret		7		
1952	HWM 51; HWM 52	Alta 2.0 L4	D	(Belgium) Johnny Claes						10			
1952	HWM 51; HWM 52	Alta 2.0 L4	D	(Netherlands) Dries van der Lof							NC		
1953	HWM 53	Alta 2.0 L-4	P		ARG	500	NED	BEL	FRA	GBR	GER	SUI	ITA
1953	HWM 53	Alta 2.0 L-4	P	(United Kingdom) Peter Collins			8	Ret	13	Ret			
1953	HWM 53	Alta 2.0 L-4	P	(United Kingdom) Lance Macklin			Ret	Ret	Ret	Ret		Ret	Ret
1953	HWM 53	Alta 2.0 L-4	P	(Belgium) Paul Frère				10				Ret	
1953	HWM 53	Alta 2.0 L-4	P	(France) Yves Giraud-Cabantous					14				15
1953	HWM 53	Alta 2.0 L-4	P	(United Kingdom) Duncan Hamilton						Ret			
1953	HWM 53	Alta 2.0 L-4	P	(United Kingdom) Jack Fairman						Ret			
1953	HWM 53	Alta 2.0 L-4	P	(Switzerland) Albert Scherrer								NC	
1953	HWM 53	Alta 2.0 L-4	P	(United States) John Fitch									Ret
1954	HWM 53	Alta 2.5 L-4	D		ARG	500	BEL	FRA	GBR	GER	SUI	ITA	ESP
1954	HWM 53	Alta 2.5 L-4	D	(United Kingdom) Lance Macklin				Ret					

=== Privateer entries ===
(key) (Results in bold indicate pole position; results in italics indicate fastest lap.)

Year	Entrant	Chassis	Engine	Driver	1	2	3	4	5	6	7	8
1952	Tony Gaze	HWM 51; HWM 52	Alta 2.0 L-4		SUI	500	BEL	FRA	GBR	GER	NED	ITA
1952	Tony Gaze	HWM 51; HWM 52	Alta 2.0 L-4	(Australia) Tony Gaze			15		Ret	Ret		DNQ
1955	E. N. Whiteaway	HWM 54	Alta 2.5 L-4		ARG	MON	500	BEL	NED	GBR	ITA	
1955	E. N. Whiteaway	HWM 54	Alta 2.5 L-4	(United Kingdom) Ted Whiteaway		DNQ						
