= Alta Car and Engineering Company =

English automobile and a Formula One racing manufacturer

Alta as a Formula One chassis constructor
- Base: (United Kingdom) Surbiton, Surrey, UK
- Founder(s): (United Kingdom) Geoffrey Taylor

Formula One World Championship career
- Engines: Alta
- Entrants: privateers
- First entry: 1950 British Grand Prix
- Last entry: 1952 British Grand Prix
- Races entered: 5
- Race victories: 0
- Pole positions: 0
- Fastest laps: 0

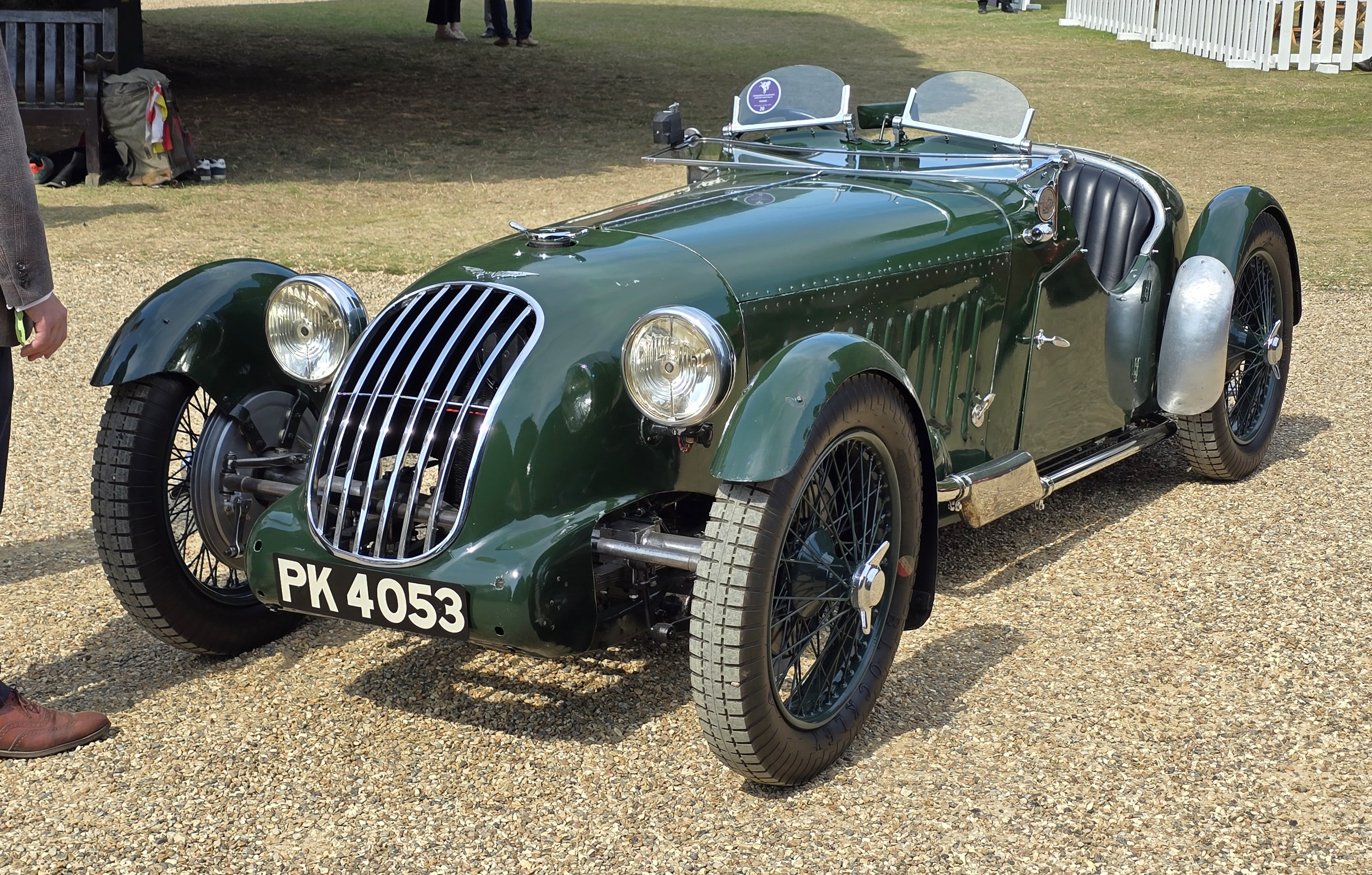
Supercharged 1,1 litre prototype, chassis 119, registered "PK 4053" on 1 November 1928

The Alta Car and Engineering Company was a British sports and racing car manufacturer, commonly known simply as Alta. Their cars contested five FIA World Championship races between 1950 and 1952, as well as Grand Prix events prior to this. They also supplied engines to a small number of other constructors, most notably the Connaught and HWM teams.

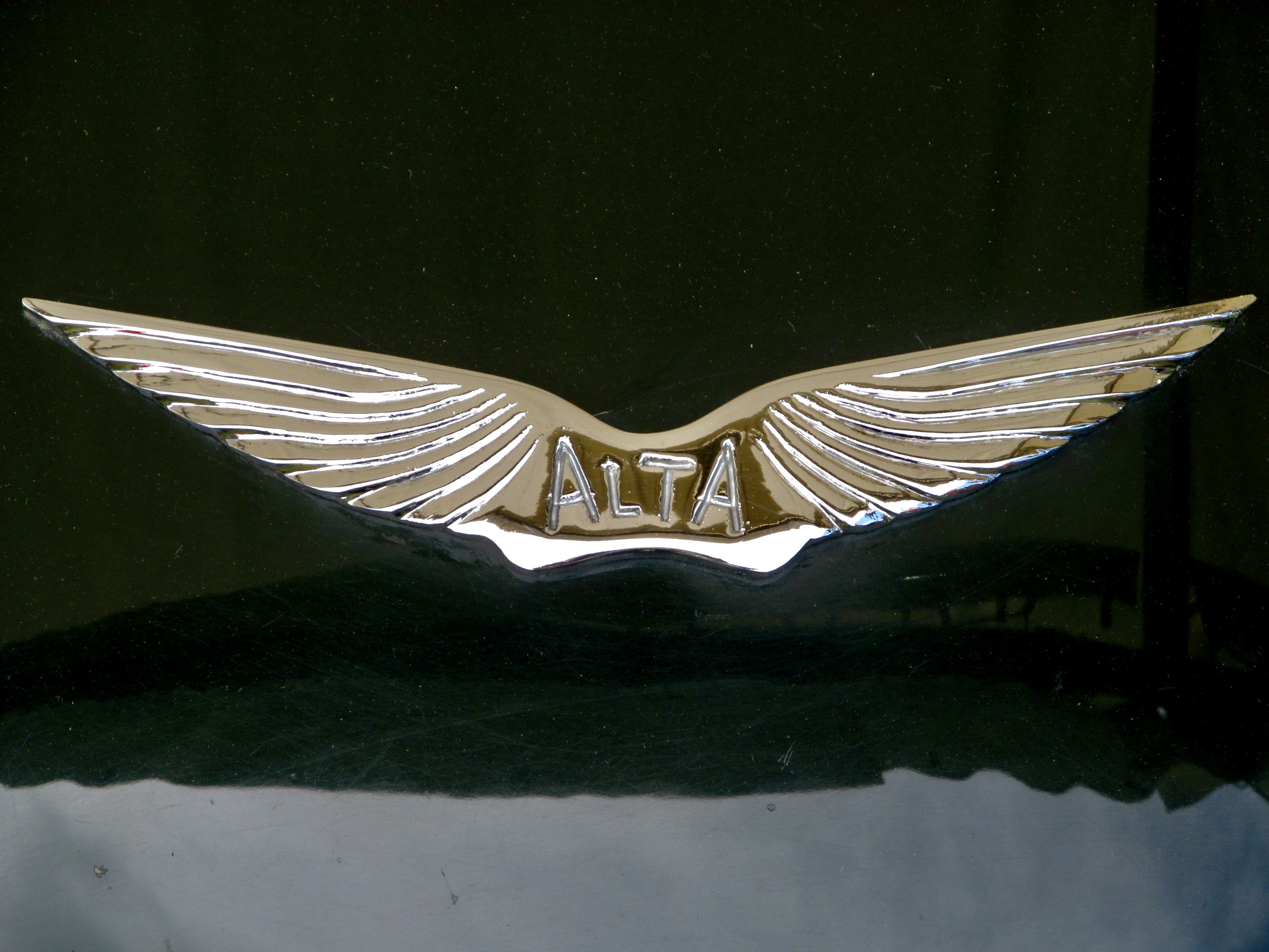
Alta badge, Goodwood Festival of Speed, 2013

== Early history ==
The company was founded by engineer Geoffrey Taylor (1903–1966) in Surbiton, Surrey, and produced its first automobile in 1929. Alta's first vehicle was a sports car powered by a 1.1L engine, featuring an aluminium block, wet liners, and shaft-driven twin overhead camshafts, which Taylor designed himself. It was offered in naturally aspirated or supercharged form giving 49 or 76 bhp (37 or 57 kW; 50 or 77 PS). A choice of four speed non-synchromesh or pre-selector gearboxes was available. These were mounted on a low-slung chassis frame with open two- or four-seat bodies. Thirteen were made, of which five are thought to survive.

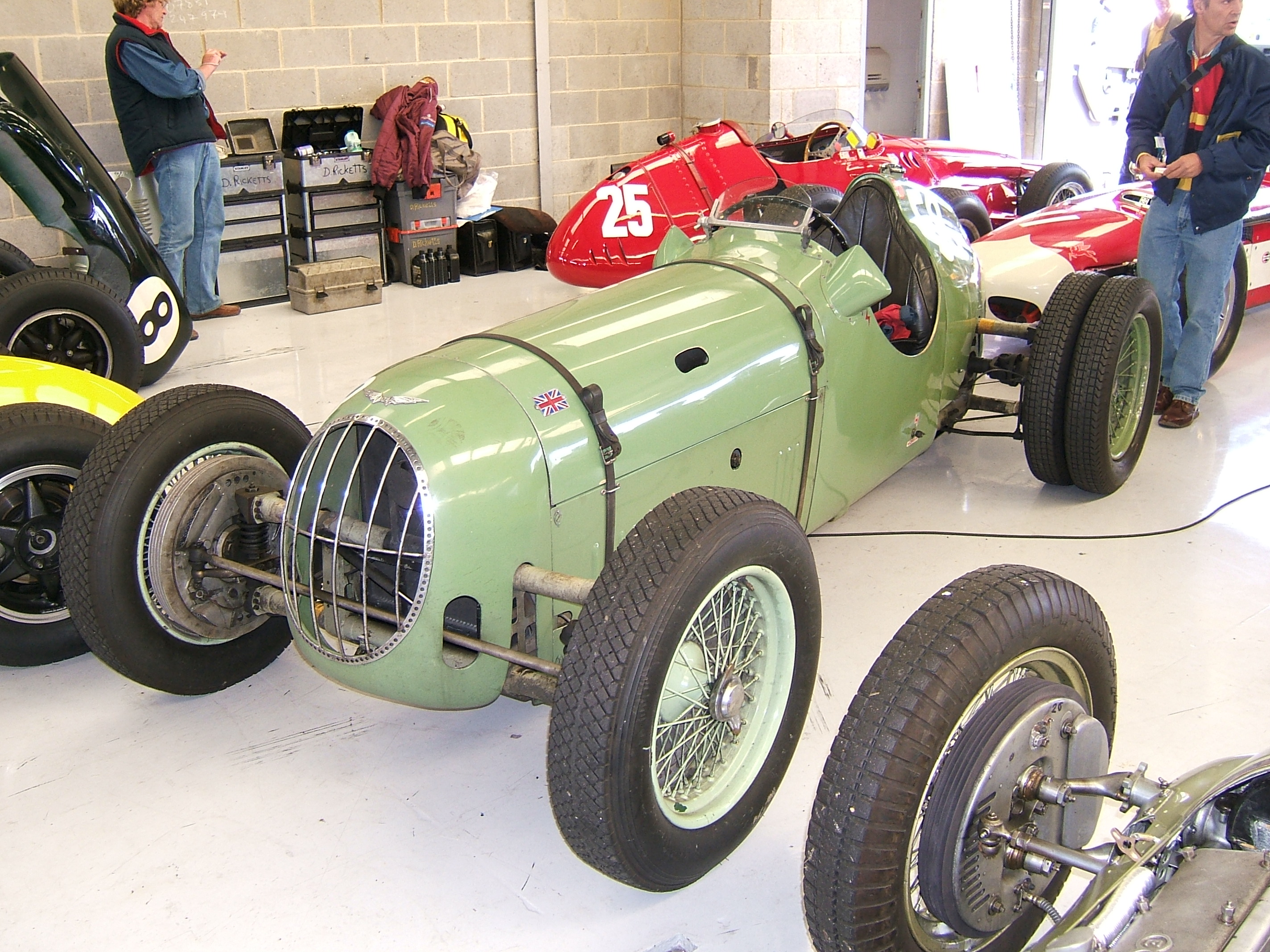
A pre-WWII (c. 1938) Alta competition model fitted with twin rear wheels for added traction in hillclimb events.

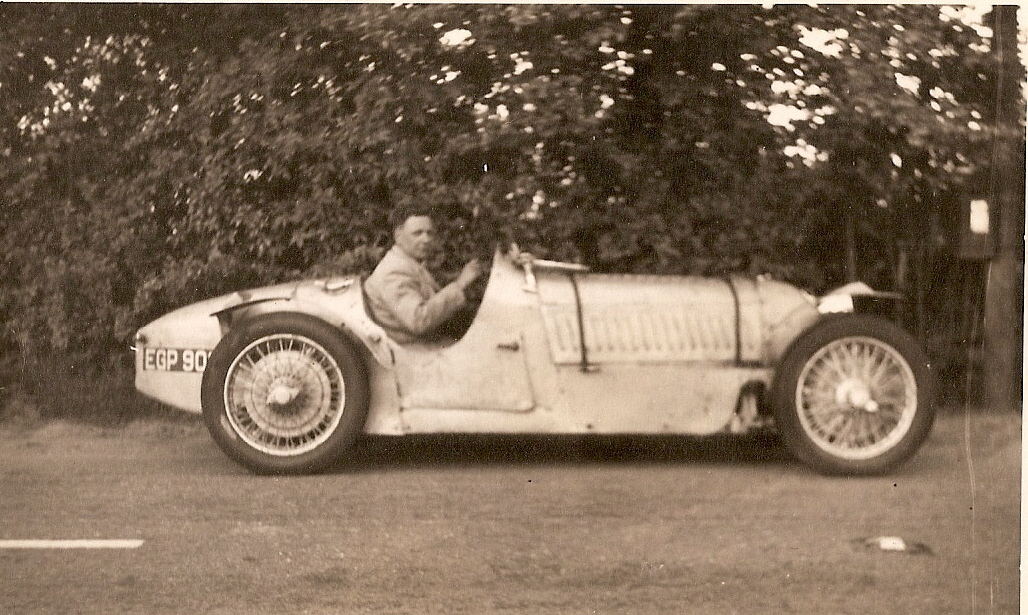
Race car designer John Crosthwaite in his 1937 1100cc Alta

This design, and its later 1.5L and 2L sister cars, sold steadily, but in limited numbers, right up to the outbreak of war in 1939. With the highest power option the car was capable of 120 mph (190 km/h) and 0–60 mph in 7 seconds. In 1937 the company introduced front independent suspension to the chassis. They became popular among club racers due to their ability to be converted easily from 1.5L to 2L or vice versa, allowing drivers on a limited budget to contest more than one class without having to buy a second car.

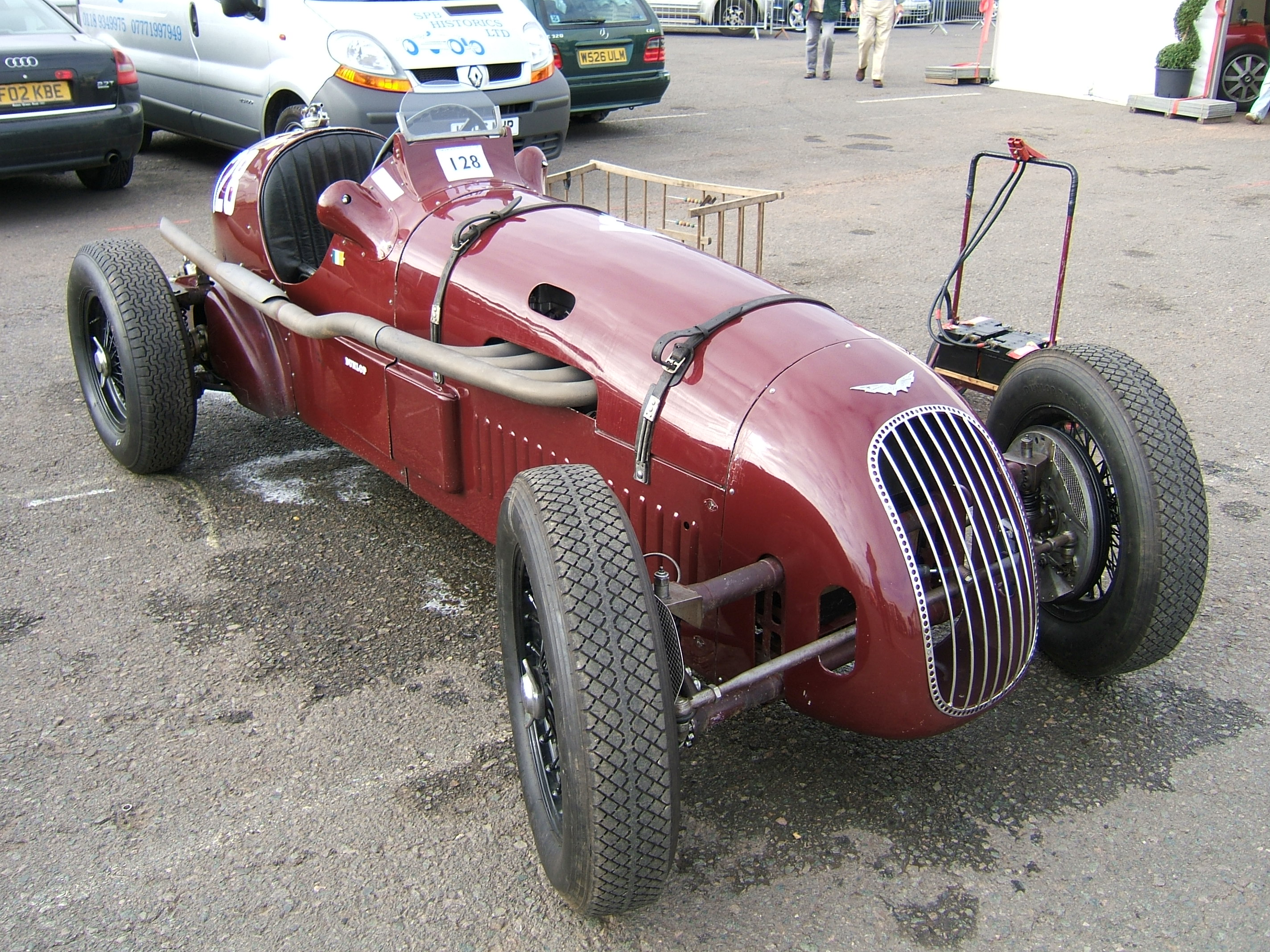
A pre-war Alta competition model in circuit racing trim.

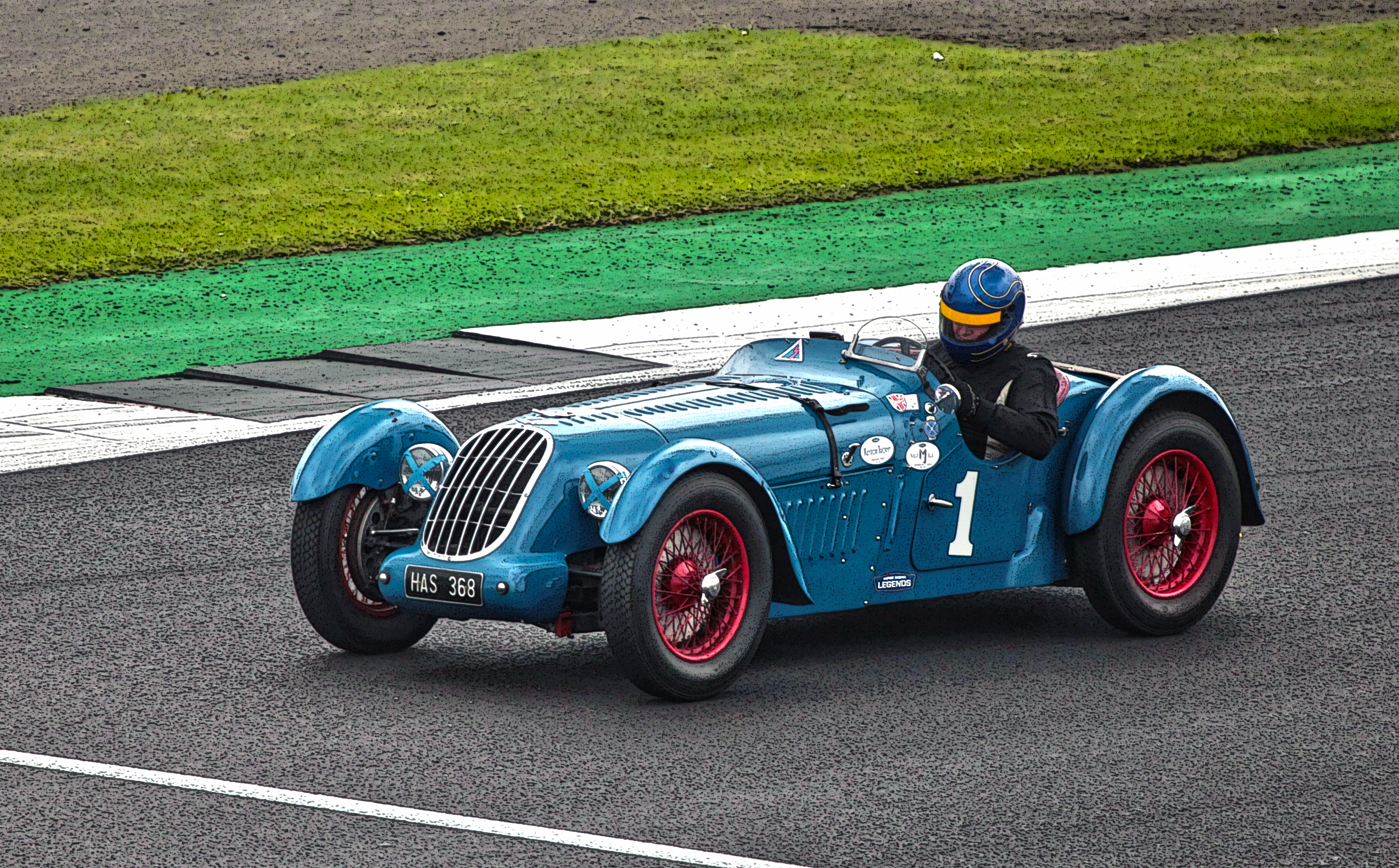
1936 Alta 2-Litre Sports (chassis no. 64S)

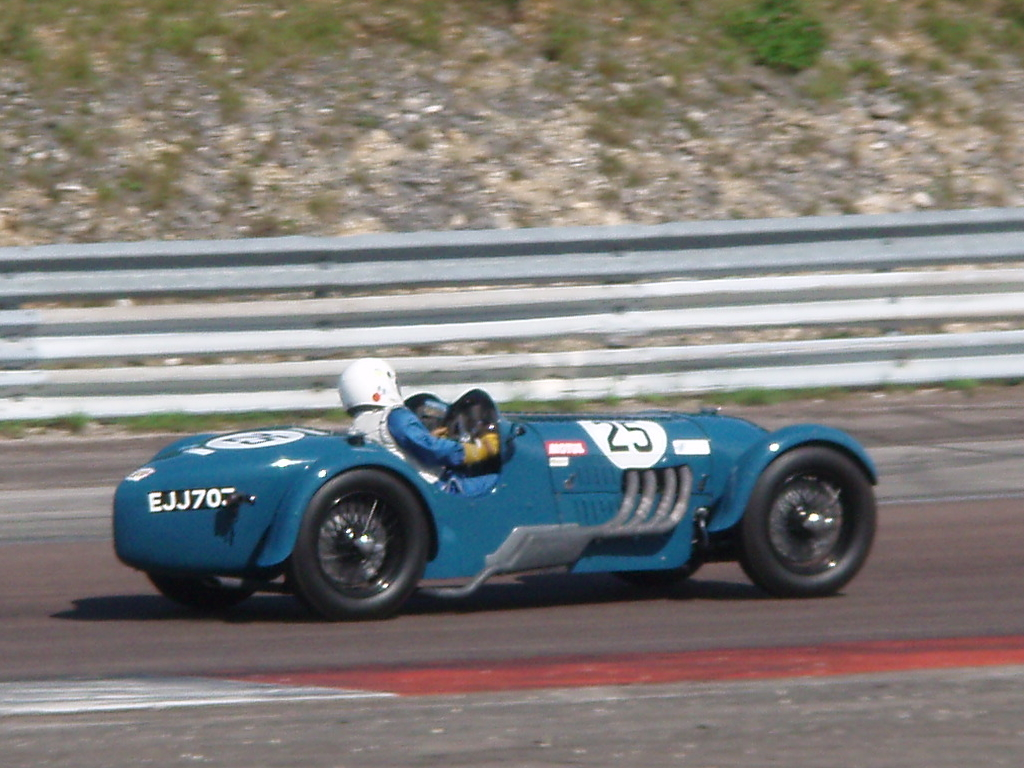
A 1936 Alta 2L S/C Sports

In 1934, Taylor produced the first Alta to be designed solely for competition. The resulting light-weight, off-set single seat voiturette cars achieved quite a reputation in shorter events such as hill-climbs, sprints, and time-trials. Once again, Alta's keen pricing, in comparison to the expensive ERA models, resulted in many sales to amateur racers. However, a lack of reliability kept the Alta name out of the long distance Grand Prix events. A revised voiturette design appeared in 1937, with independent front suspension. George Abecassis had some success with this design, winning a string of events before the Second World War interrupted. As war approached, Taylor was drafting designs for a new straight-8 engine and a third-generation voiturette, this time with fully independent suspension. This last prewar car was highly advanced for its time, and was very nearly complete in late 1939. However, as soon as war was declared, Alta's production capabilities were given over to the war effort, and production of the new designs was halted.

In February 2018, a 1936 Alta 2-Litre Sports (chassis no. 64S) sold at Bonhams' Paris auction for 345,000€ inc. premium.

== Post-war ==
=== Alta GP ===
Despite Alta's diminutive size, and their status as a primarily road car manufacturer, Alta was in fact the first British constructor to produce a new Grand Prix car following the end of World War II. Austerity limitations of raw materials did not stop Taylor beginning production of designs he had been developing throughout the war years, and the Alta GP car appeared in 1948. He also restarted production of the road-going sports cars, although without further development funding the popularity of these models rapidly dwindled. Prior to 1948, the last pre-war Alta was campaigned with varying degrees of success.

The Alta GP car was a development of the pre-war design, but was powered by a supercharged 1.5L engine, developing approximately 230bhp, and retained the 4-speed pre-selector gearbox of the prewar cars. Taylor developed the independent suspension design further, introducing wishbones and rubber linkage bushings. The first car was supplied to privateer driver George Abecassis, who campaigned it throughout 1948 and into 1949, but only finished once. Abecassis would go on to use Alta engines to power his HWM team from 1951 to 1955.

Modifications were made to the bodywork and gearchange for the subsequent 1949 and 1950 GP2 and GP3 vehicles, GP3 also gaining a two-stage supercharger. Once again they were built to order, and supplied to Geoffrey Crossley and Joe Kelly respectively. Crossley took GP2 to the 1949 Belgian Grand Prix, but could only manage seventh place. In 1950 he set a number of speed records over 50 miles, 50 km and 100 km at the Montlhéry circuit. Kelly concentrated mostly on Irish races, and his best finish was third in the 1952 Ulster Trophy. Both drivers took their respective chassis to the 1950 British Grand Prix, the first ever Formula One World Championship race. However, while Kelly finished, he was unclassified; Crossley retired with a transmission fault.

Kelly later carried out extensive modification and rebuilding work on GP3, running it as the Irish Racing Automobiles (IRA) car during 1952 and 1953. His most significant change was to replace the Alta engine with a Bristol unit.

=== Alta F2 ===
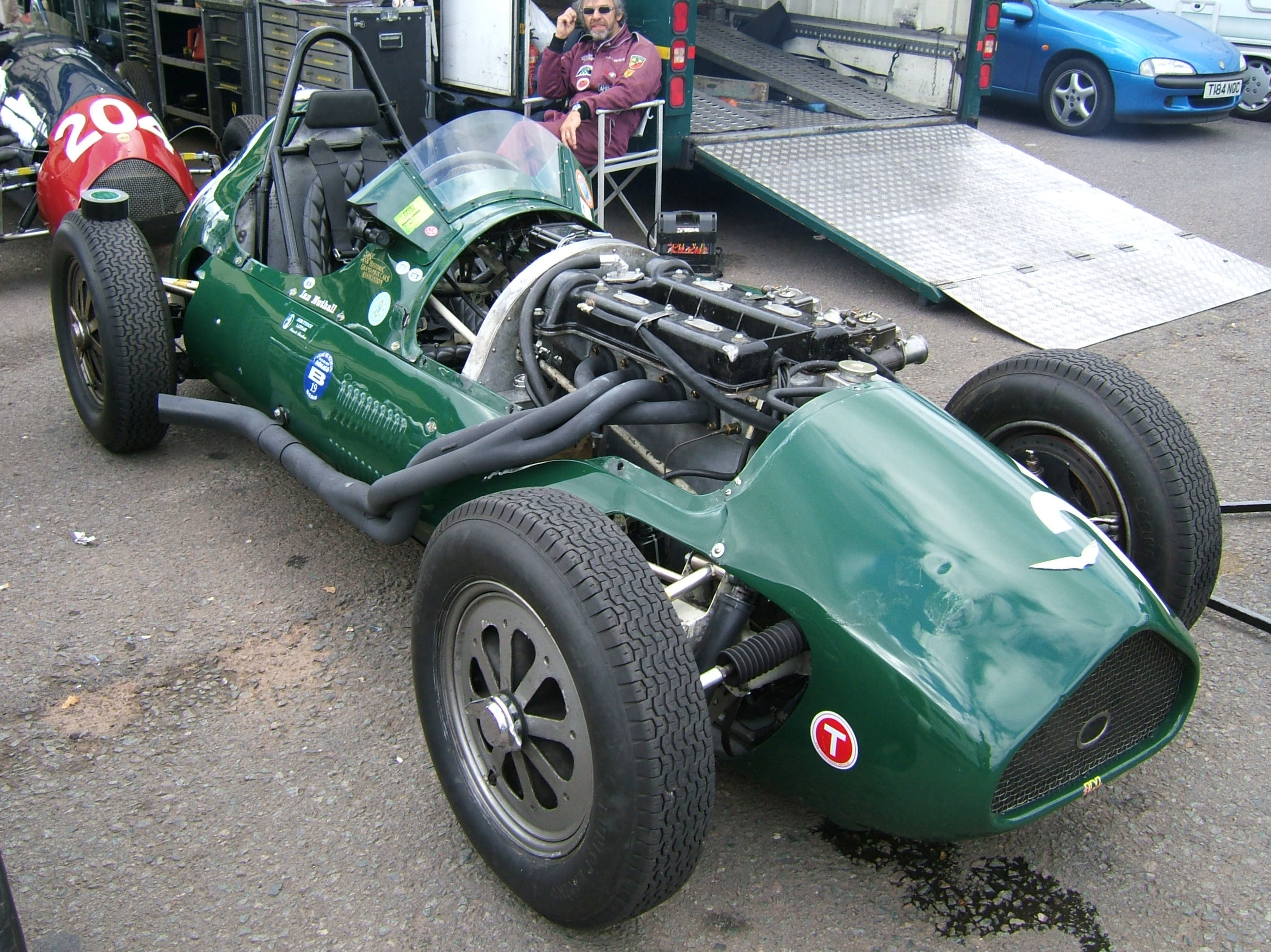
An Alta F2 with bonnet removed.

Lacking the funding necessary to develop a Formula One successor to the GP design, Taylor decided to move into the junior Formula Two category. The engine produced was a 1970 cc inline 4-cylinder, naturally aspirated unit, developing around 130 bhp (97 kW; 132 PS). Unfortunately, Alta's own chassis design followed the preceding GP car very closely, and this resulted in an overweight car considering the greatly reduced power available from the unsupercharged motors. Tony Gaze and Gordon Watson took F2/1 and F2/2 on a tour of European races, but good results were hard to come by.

Although according to Dennis Jenkinson's book Historic Racing Cars the uncompleted GP4 machine was converted and became F2/3 this was not correct and chassis GP4 was sold to Bobbie Baird in Ireland and eventually became a Jaguar engined 2 seater sportscar. It competed in this form and still exists as a Jaguar 2 seater sportscar. F2/3 was no more successful than its siblings. F2/4 followed in construction and was sold to Orlando Simpson before Peter Whitehead placed an order for what was to become the last Alta car built: F2/5. This F2 Alta was entered for World Championship Grands Prix events, first driven by himself in the 1952 French Grand Prix, and then by his half-brother Graham Whitehead at the 1952 British Grand Prix. Neither run produced a points finish, but this was not to be the last time that the Alta name appeared in Formula One.

=== Alta the engine supplier ===
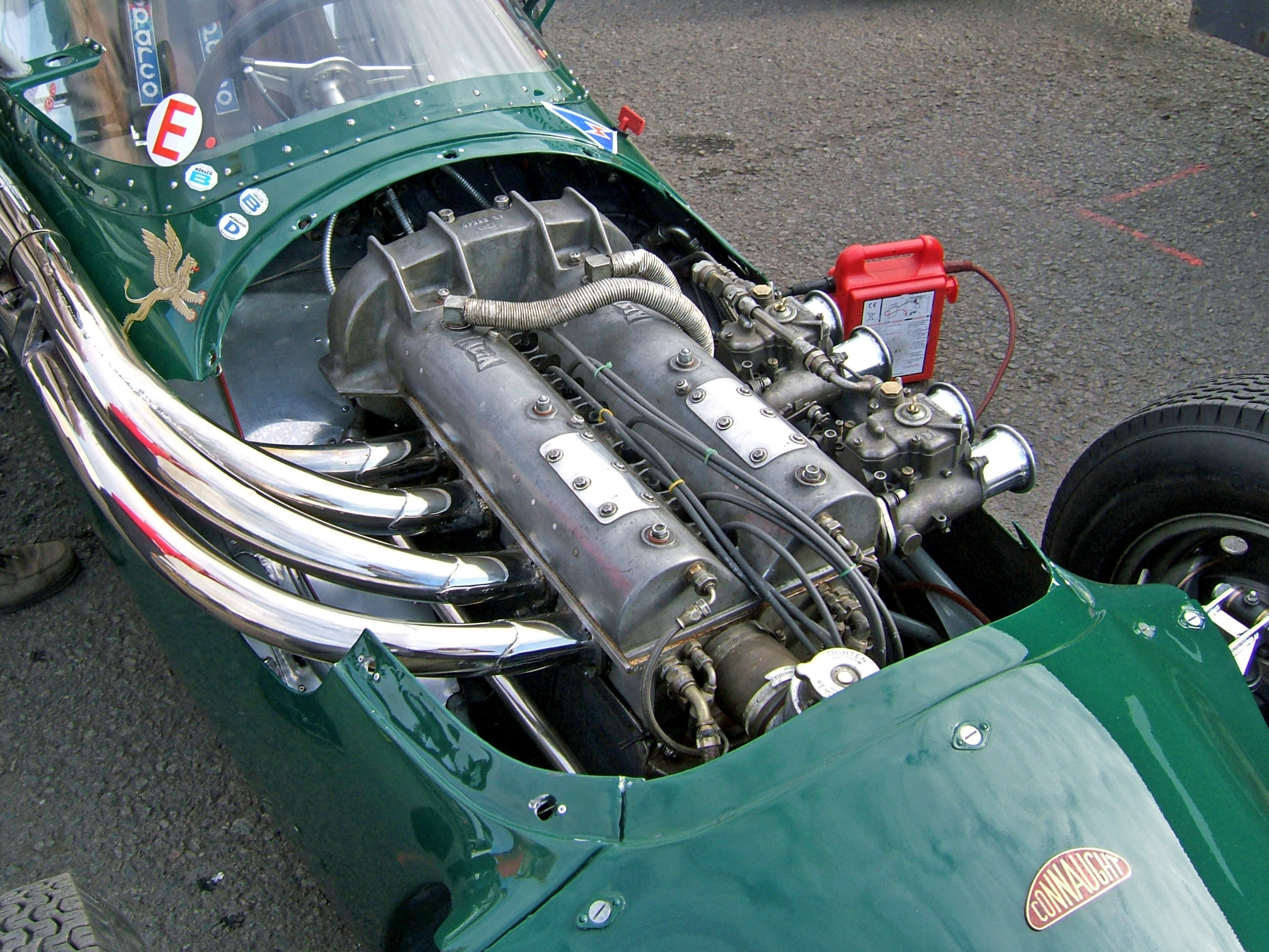
An Alta straight-4 engine, installed into a Connaught Type C Formula One car of 1959.

While the F2 engine might have been overwhelmed by the chassis' bulk, tweaks made by Peter Whitehead to the unit in his car showed that the design had tuning potential. Alta engines had already been used by the HWM team since 1949, and from 1953 many more mechanics would come to know the Taylor-designed power plant. Peter Whitehead led the way by removing the engine from F2/5 and installing it into a Cooper T24 chassis, which he ran in the 1953 British Grand Prix. Also present at Silverstone that day were no fewer than four Alta-powered HWM cars. HWM had, the previous year, scored what was Alta's only significant victory, when Lance Macklin won the 1952 BRDC International Trophy race at Silverstone. Over the next few years 1.5L and 2.5L Alta engines would find their way into many British-built F1 hopefuls, the most successful of which were Connaught and Cooper. Ultimately the engine would prove to be capable of approximately 240 bhp (179 kW; 243 PS). With the collapse of Connaught in 1959, the Alta name disappeared from Formula One for good.

=== Aftermarket speed equipment ===
After World War Two, Alta produced aftermarket speed equipment. Their best known product was an overhead valve head conversion kit for the early Morris Minor & Morris Eight, which came with a flathead engine. This allowed the 27 BHP flathead to double its power. They also made high compression cylinder heads for the Austin 7.

== Recent history ==
Geoffrey Taylor died in 1966 at the age of 63. In 1976, his son Michael attempted to revive the Alta name with a Formula Ford car but was not successful. A handful of the pre-war sports and single seat cars survive, all in private ownership. GP101, which was originally owned by George Abecassis, was rebuilt for Phil Scragg as a hill climb car and is still in use. F2/5 has been reunited with its original powerplant and has participated in a number of Historic race meeting in recent years, including the 1999 Goodwood Revival meeting.

== Complete Formula One World Championship results ==
(key)

Year	Entrant	Chassis	Engine	Tyres	Driver	1	2	3	4	5	6	7	8
1950	Private	Alta GP	Alta L4s	D		GBR	MON	500	SUI	BEL	FRA	ITA	
1950	Private	Alta GP	Alta L4s	D	(United Kingdom) Geoffrey Crossley	Ret				9			
1950	Private	Alta GP	Alta L4s	D	(Republic of Ireland) Joe Kelly	NC							
1951	Private	Alta GP	Alta L4s	D		SUI	500	BEL	FRA	GBR	GER	ITA	ESP
1951	Private	Alta GP	Alta L4s	D	(Republic of Ireland) Joe Kelly					NC			
1952	P. Whitehead	Alta F2	Alta L4	D		SUI	500	BEL	FRA	GBR	GER	NED	ITA
1952	P. Whitehead	Alta F2	Alta L4	D	(United Kingdom) Peter Whitehead				Ret				
1952	P. Whitehead	Alta F2	Alta L4	D	(United Kingdom) Graham Whitehead					12			

n.b. Prior to 1958 there was no Constructor's World Championship, hence constructors were not awarded points.

== See also ==
- List of car manufacturers of the United Kingdom
