= 2006–07 FC Groningen season =

FC Groningen
2006–07 season
- Manager: Ron Jans
- Stadium: Euroborg
- Eredivisie: 8th
- KNVB Cup: Third round
- UEFA Cup: First round
- Top goalscorer: Erik Nevland (13)

The 2006–07 season was FC Groningen's seventh consecutive campaign in the Eredivisie, the top tier of Dutch football, following their promotion in 1999–2000. It was the club's first full season at the newly inaugurated Euroborg, which seated over 20,000 spectators. Having finished fifth the previous year and secured a place in the 2006–07 UEFA Cup via the domestic play-offs, Groningen were eliminated in the first round, losing 4–3 on aggregate to Partizan.

Domestically, Groningen finished eighth in the league, again qualifying for the European play-offs. They defeated Feyenoord in the first round and overcame Utrecht in the final to secure a return to the UEFA Cup for the following season.

In the second half of the campaign, goalkeeper Bas Roorda lost his starting place to Brian van Loo, with manager Ron Jans opting for a change ahead of a league fixture against Twente. Roorda, then 31, had started every match up to that point.

The season is particularly noted for the breakthrough of Luis Suárez, who had joined from Nacional in Uruguay ahead of the campaign. In his only season at the club, Suárez scored 15 goals in 37 appearances across all competitions, earning a transfer to Ajax in the summer of 2007 for a reported fee of €7.5 million.

== First-team squad ==
Squad at end of season

Note: Flags indicate national team as defined under FIFA eligibility rules; some limited exceptions apply. Players may hold more than one non-FIFA nationality.

No.	Pos.	Nation	Player
—	GK	NED	Bas Roorda
—	GK	NED	Brian van Loo
—	DF	NED	Ewald Koster
—	MF	NED	Tom Hiariej
—	MF	SWE	Rasmus Lindgren
—	MF	UKR	Yevhen Levchenko
—	FW	NED	Yuri Cornelisse
—	FW	NED	Marnix Kolder
—	MF	NED	Koen van de Laak
—	MF	SRB	Goran Lovre
—	DF	NED	Martijn van der Laan
—	DF	CZE	Ondřej Švejdík
—	MF	NED	Paul Matthijs
—	FW	NOR	Erik Nevland
—	DF	URU	Bruno Silva

No.	Pos.	Nation	Player
—	DF	NED	Donovan Slijngard (on loan from Ajax)
—	MF	NED	Mark-Jan Fledderus
—	GK	NED	Gijs Koopmans
—	MF	NED	Martijn Meerdink
—	DF	SLE	Gibril Sankoh
—	MF	NED	Marcel Pannekoek
—	MF	NED	Danny Holla
—	FW	NED	Jasmin Ramic
—	FW	NED	Robbin Kieft
—	DF	NED	Koert Thalen
—	FW	URU	Luis Suárez
—	FW	NED	Tim Velten
—	DF	NED	Arnold Kruiswijk
—	MF	NED	Sander Rozema
—	DF	NED	Antoine van der Linden

=== Left club during season ===
Note: Flags indicate national team as defined under FIFA eligibility rules; some limited exceptions apply. Players may hold more than one non-FIFA nationality.

No.	Pos.	Nation	Player
—	MF	NED	Danny Buijs (to Feyenoord)
—	DF	SWE	Mathias Florén (to IF Elfsborg)

No.	Pos.	Nation	Player
—	MF	NED	Stefano Seedorf (to Apollon Limassol)
—	FW	RSA	Glen Salmon (on loan to NAC Breda)
