= 1953 Newcastle Journal Trophy =

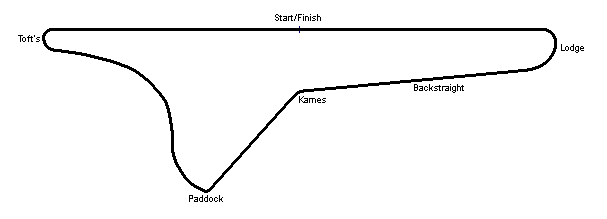

Race details
- Date: 15 August 1953
- Official name: II Newcastle Journal Trophy
- Location: Charterhall, Berwickshire, UK
- Course: Airfield circuit
- Course length: 3.218 km (2.000 mi)
- Distance: 50 laps, 160.934 km (100.000 mi)

Fastest lap
Drivers	(United Kingdom) Ken Wharton	Cooper-Bristol
	(United Kingdom) Roy Salvadori	Connaught-Lea Francis
	(United Kingdom) Ron Flockhart	Connaught-Lea Francis
- Time: 1:26.0

Podium
First	(United Kingdom) Ken Wharton	Cooper-Bristol
Second	(United Kingdom) Roy Salvadori	Connaught-Lea Francis
Third	(United Kingdom) Ron Flockhart	Connaught-Lea Francis

The 2nd Newcastle Journal Trophy was a non-championship Formula Two motor race held at Charterhall on 15 August 1953. The race was won by Ken Wharton in a Cooper T20-Bristol. Roy Salvadori and Ron Flockhart were second and third in their Connaught A Type-Lea Francises All three shared fastest lap.

== Results ==
Pos	No	Driver	Entrant	Car	Time/Retired
1	39	(United Kingdom) Ken Wharton	Ken Wharton	Cooper T20-Bristol	1:15:30.6, 79.72 mph
2	106	(United Kingdom) Roy Salvadori	Connaught Racing Syndicate	Connaught Type A-Lea Francis	+27.4s
3	107	(United Kingdom) Ron Flockhart	Connaught Racing Syndicate	Connaught Type A-Lea Francis	+32.0s
4	32	(United Kingdom) Bob Gerard	F.R. Gerard	Cooper T20-Bristol	50 laps
5	38	(United Kingdom) Tony Rolt	R.R.C. Walker Racing Team	Connaught Type A-Lea Francis	+1 lap
6	58	(United Kingdom) Ian Stewart	Ecurie Ecosse	Connaught Type A-Lea Francis	+1 lap
7	16	(United Kingdom) Eric Brandon	Cooper Car Company	Cooper T16-JAP	+2 laps
8	68	(United Kingdom) Jack Walton	Jack Walton	Cooper T25-Bristol	+2 laps
Ret	105	(United Kingdom) John Coombs	Connaught Racing Syndicate	Connaught Type A-Lea Francis	brakes
Ret	92	(United Kingdom) Jack Fairman	John Webb	Turner-Lea Francis	big end
Ret	66	(United Kingdom) Horace Gould	Gould's Garage Bristol	Cooper T23-Bristol	mechanical
Ret	97	(United Kingdom) Stirling Moss	Stirling Moss	Cooper T24-Alta	fuel injection
Ret	57	(United Kingdom) Jimmy Stewart	Ecurie Ecosse	Cooper T20-Bristol	
	37	(United Kingdom) Bill Skelly	Bill Skelly	Frazer-Nash-Bristol	
	55	(United Kingdom) Jimmy Somervail	Border Reivers	Cooper T20-Bristol	
	62	(United Kingdom) Austen Nurse	Austen Nurse	HWM-Alta	
	69	(United Kingdom) Peter Bolton	Jack Walton	Frazer-Nash-Bristol	
	71	(United Kingdom) Bill Black	Bill Black	Frazer-Nash-Bristol	
DNA	10	(France) André Loens	Kieft Cars	Kieft-Bristol	
DNA	64	(Switzerland) Ottorino Volonterio	Ottorino Volonterio	Maserati 4CLT/48	

Previous race: 1953 Sables Grand Prix	Formula One non-championship races 1953 season	Next race: 1953 Circuit de Cadours
Previous race: 1952 Newcastle Journal Trophy	Newcastle Journal Trophy	Next race: —
