= Kieft =

Kieft is a Dutch surname. Kieft is a regional and/or archaic form of modern Dutch kievit (= lapwing). Notable people with the surname include:

- Adam Kieft (born 1982), American football offensive lineman
- Cyril Kieft (1911–2004), Welsh industrialist and racing driver
- Jan Jacob Kieft (1877–1946), Dutch gymnast
- Ko Kieft (born 1998), American football player
- René Kieft (born 1946), Dutch rower
- Robbin Kieft (born 1987), Dutch footballer
- Willem Kieft (1597–1647), Dutch merchant and director of New Netherland
- Wim Kieft (born 1962), Dutch footballer

Van de(r) Kieft:

- Arjen van der Kieft (born 1985), Dutch speed skater
- Fleur van de Kieft (born 1973), Dutch field hockey player
- nl:Johan van de Kieft (1884–1970), Dutch government minister

== See also ==
- Kieft Cars, a British motorcar company founded by Cyril Kieft
- Kieft's War, a conflict (1643–1645) between settlers of New Netherland and the native Lenape population in what is now New York
