= Don Parker (racing driver) =

English racing driver (1908–1997)

- Nationality: British
- Born: 11 November 1908 Ramsgate, Kent, England
- Died: 20 May 1997 (aged 88) Portsmouth, England
- Retired: 1960

British Formula Three Championship
- Years active: 1951–1960
- Best finish: 1st; in 1952, 1953 and 1959

Don Parker (11 November 1908 – 20 May 1997) was an English racing driver who was British Formula Three Champion on three occasions (1952, 1953 and 1959). He also competed in the British Saloon Car Championship.

== Racing career ==
=== Early career ===
Parker was born in Ramsgate, Kent, England and did not see a motor race until he was 40 years of age. In the late 1940s, Parker was running a small engineering firm in South London and inherited a 500 cc (31 cu in) racing car from an adjacent company. He adapted this to better suit his own slight build and it made a winning debut at Brough in April 1949. He took three other podium finishes that year and set fastest time in his class at the Brighton Speed Trials.

The next season (1950), 500cc racing became recognised by the Fédération Internationale de l'Automobile (FIA) as Formula Three. Parker drove his JAP-engined "special" in competition to the Norton-equipped works and privateer Coopers. In theory, his home-produced car should not have been competitive but he still managed 10 wins during the season and third place in the Monaco Grand Prix Formula Three support race.

1951 was the inaugural season for the British Formula Three Championship and Parker acquired a James Bottoms Special (JBS) chassis and was provided with works JAP engines. However, James Bottoms' son Alf was killed at the 1951 Luxembourg Grand Prix and the factory lost its impetus thereafter. Despite this, Parker achieved 12 wins in the season and was classified fourth in the championship standings. In May he tested the works Kieft chassis and his times equalled those of Stirling Moss.

=== Championship years ===
In 1952, Parker began an important long-term racing partnership with Cyril Kieft, who had left the British steel industry upon its nationalisation. He turned to motorsport and set out to build a 'state-of-the-art' Formula Three car, the Kieft CK1. Moss was the designated driver but could not compete in every event due to commitments elsewhere. Kieft, therefore, turned to Parker and as a director of Norton was able to arrange engine supply. Parker adapted the parts supplied by Kieft to suit him better, his car could be considered a Parker Special due to the changes, and the cars built by him and team mechanic Ray Martin (for Moss) were said to be superior to customer chassis.

The season proved a successful one for Parker with a total of 22 wins and the Autosport Formula Three championship, together with the Light Car Challenge and Veterans Trophy. At the British Grand Prix support race he was denied victory over Moss only by a last lap primary-chain breakage.

1953 was also a successful season for Parker. Continuing to develop the Kieft chassis to his own specification, he achieved 30 wins and a further 12 podium finishes out of 44 races and took the title for a second consecutive season.

In 1954, Parker acquired one of the last Kieft chassis and continued to develop it to his own specification. His closest rival was Les Leston in a Cooper Mk VIII (a much newer design) and the title was only decided after the addition of a Boxing Day race at Brands Hatch, where Leston finished one place ahead of Parker and took the title by half-a-point.

At the beginning of 1955, Parker took over the maintenance and development of all the Kieft Formula Three cars. However, although Moss had by then moved on to other categories, Cooper, with their new Mk IX design, had a strong driver line-up including Jim Russell, Ivor Bueb, Cliff Allison and Stuart Lewis-Evans. Parker still took ten wins but it was not enough to keep him in the title race which was won by Russell.

=== Later career ===
Parker began 1956 with the Kieft chassis and took a win at Brough in March. However, by mid-season he'd made the change to a Cooper-Norton but without any greater success, only two further wins followed and the title was won by Russell. There was little improvement in 1957 when Russell again took the title. Parker achieved several podium finishes but only one win.

1958 began with an early win at Snetterton which was followed by several podium finishes and late-season wins at Snetterton again and Brands Hatch. It was an improvement over the previous seasons but not the dominance of the title-winning years. Parker, however, was nearing the end of his career and was almost 50 years of age. The championship was won by Trevor Taylor.

1959 would be Parker's last full season as a racing driver. A number of his rivals from previous series had moved to other categories but his experience enabled him to compete effectively against a new set of younger drivers. He won again at Snetterton, took two wins at Brands Hatch and further wins at Oulton Park and Crystal Palace. Several other podium finishes yielded his third Formula Three title. He retired shortly after the season ended.

Parker received offers from Lotus and Lister to race in other categories but declined them as he lacked confidence in his own abilities. He also occasionally competed in the British Saloon Car Championship using the cars he used to tow his Formula Three racers. Despite them being road cars and un-modified, he still achieved race wins.

== Personal life ==
Parker's childhood was unconventional in that his education was often interrupted by calls to assist in his father's horse-trading business and he left home at the age of 12, eventually finding his way into the engineering industry.

Parker met his second wife Dora at Goodwood in 1951, when she was still in her teens. Despite the age difference, they married when she became 21 and remained together until Parker's death. They had two daughters.

In 1959, whilst still an active driver, Parker began to manufacture trailers which were used by multiple teams in subsequent seasons.

Don Parker died on 20 May 1997, aged 88, from prostate cancer.

== Racing record ==
=== Complete British Saloon Car Championship results ===
(key)

Year	Team	Car	Class	1	2	3	4	5	6	7	8	9	DC	Pts	Class
1958	Don Parker	Jensen 541	D	BRH; 4†	BRH	MAL	BRH	BRH	CRY	BRH	BRH; 3	BRH; 7	?	?	?
1960	Don Parker	Jaguar XK150	GT +1600cc	BRH	SNE	MAL	OUL; 1*	SNE	BRH	BRH	BRH		NC*	0*	

† Events with 2 races staged for the different classes.

- Car over 1000cc - Not eligible for points.
