= Bas Roorda =

Dutch footballer (born 1973)

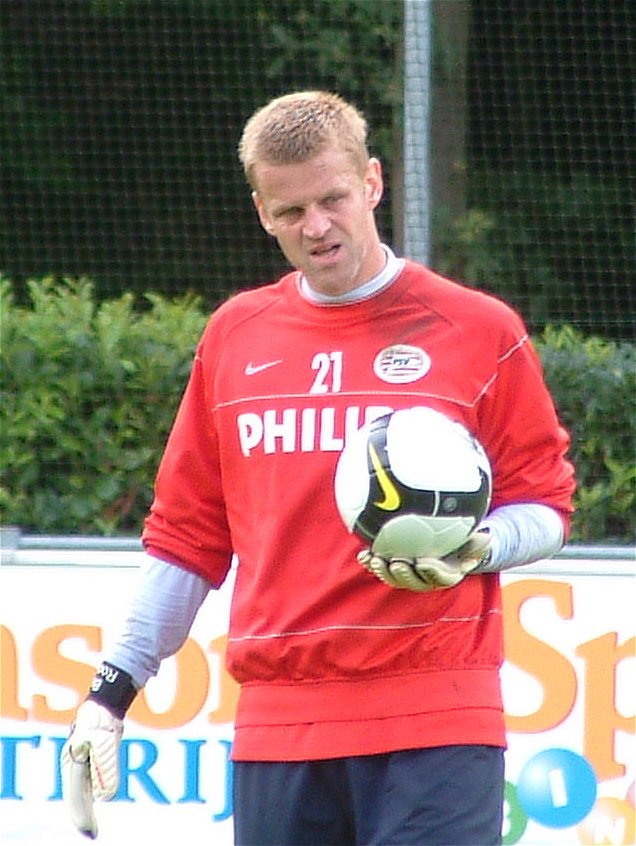
- Roorda in 2006

Personal information
- Date of birth: 13 February 1973 (age 53)
- Place of birth: Assen, Netherlands
- Height: 1.92 m (6 ft 4 in)
- Position: Goalkeeper

Youth career
- –1988: LTC
- 1988–1992: Groningen

Senior career*
Years	Team	Apps	(Gls)
1992–1996	Groningen	26	(0)
1996–2000	NEC	127	(0)
2000–2004	Roda JC	29	(0)
2004–2007	Groningen	97	(0)
2007–2010	PSV	1	(0)
Total		280	(0)
- * Club domestic league appearances and goals

Bas Roorda (born 13 February 1973) is a Dutch former professional footballer who played as a goalkeeper. Since 2020, he has worked as team manager for PSV.

== Playing career ==
Roorda began his professional career with Groningen, serving as understudy to Patrick Lodewijks. Over the course of four seasons, he made 26 league appearances before moving to NEC in 1996. At NEC, he established himself as the first-choice goalkeeper, making 127 appearances across four Eredivisie campaigns.

In 2000, Roorda joined Roda JC, where he initially shared goalkeeping duties with Zeljko Kalac but saw limited action in later seasons, backing up Vladan Kujović. He featured in 14 matches during his first year at the club but did not make a single appearance during the 2003–04 season. Roorda returned to Groningen in 2004 as the successor to Roy Beukenkamp and was installed as the club's starting goalkeeper. He played all 34 league matches in his first season back. However, during the 2006–07 campaign, he lost his place to Brian van Loo.

On 5 June 2007, Roorda signed a two-year contract with PSV, where he served as backup to Heurelho Gomes. His only first-team appearance for the club came in the 2007–08 UEFA Cup quarter-final against Fiorentina, in which he played the final 29 minutes as a substitute. Roorda did not feature in any matches during his subsequent two seasons with the club, and his contract was not renewed at the end of the 2009–10 campaign.

Following his departure from professional football, Roorda joined amateur side Wilhelmina Boys. He also served on the board of the Dutch players' union VVCS, working as a player advisor. In 2011, he was appointed goalkeeping coach for the youth teams at PSV, succeeding Hans Segers.

== Post-playing career ==
After one season as a goalkeeping coach for the youth teams at PSV, Bas Roorda took up the role of team manager for the first team of Groningen at the start of the 2012–13 season, succeeding Theo Huizinga. In 2020, he made the move to PSV, where he serves as team manager.

== Honours ==
PSV

- Eredivisie: 2007–08
- Johan Cruyff Shield: 2008
