= Jaguar XK140 =

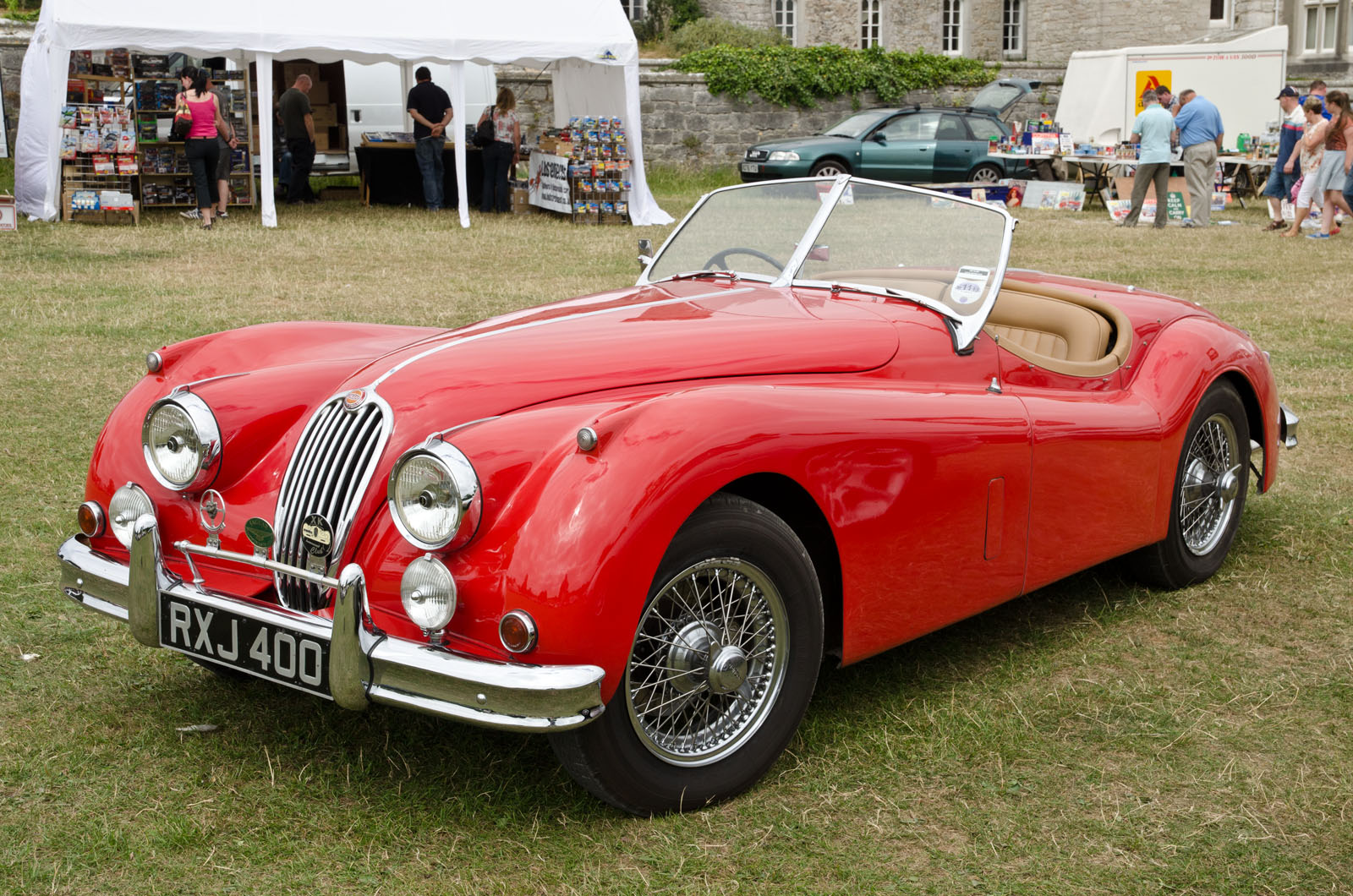
- 1955 XK140 open two-seater or roadster

Overview
- Manufacturer: Jaguar Cars
- Production: 1954–1957
- Assembly: United Kingdom: Coventry

Body and chassis
- Class: Sports car
- Body style: 2-seat roadster 2-seat convertible 2-seat coupé
- Layout: FR layout

Powertrain
- Engine: 3442 cc I6
- Transmission: 4-speed manual

Dimensions
- Wheelbase: 102 in (2,591 mm)
- Length: 176 in (4,470 mm)
- Width: 64.5 in (1,638 mm)
- Kerb weight: 3,136–3,248 lb (1,422–1,473 kg)

Chronology
- Predecessor: Jaguar XK120
- Successor: Jaguar XK150

The Jaguar XK140 is a sports car manufactured by Jaguar between 1954 and 1957 as the successor to the XK120. Upgrades included more interior space, improved brakes, rack and pinion steering, increased suspension travel, and telescopic shock absorbers instead of the older lever arm design.

== History ==
The XK140 was introduced in late 1954 and sold as a 1955 model. Exterior changes that distinguished it from the XK120 included more substantial front and rear bumpers with overriders, and flashing turn signals (operated by a switch on the dash) above the front bumper.

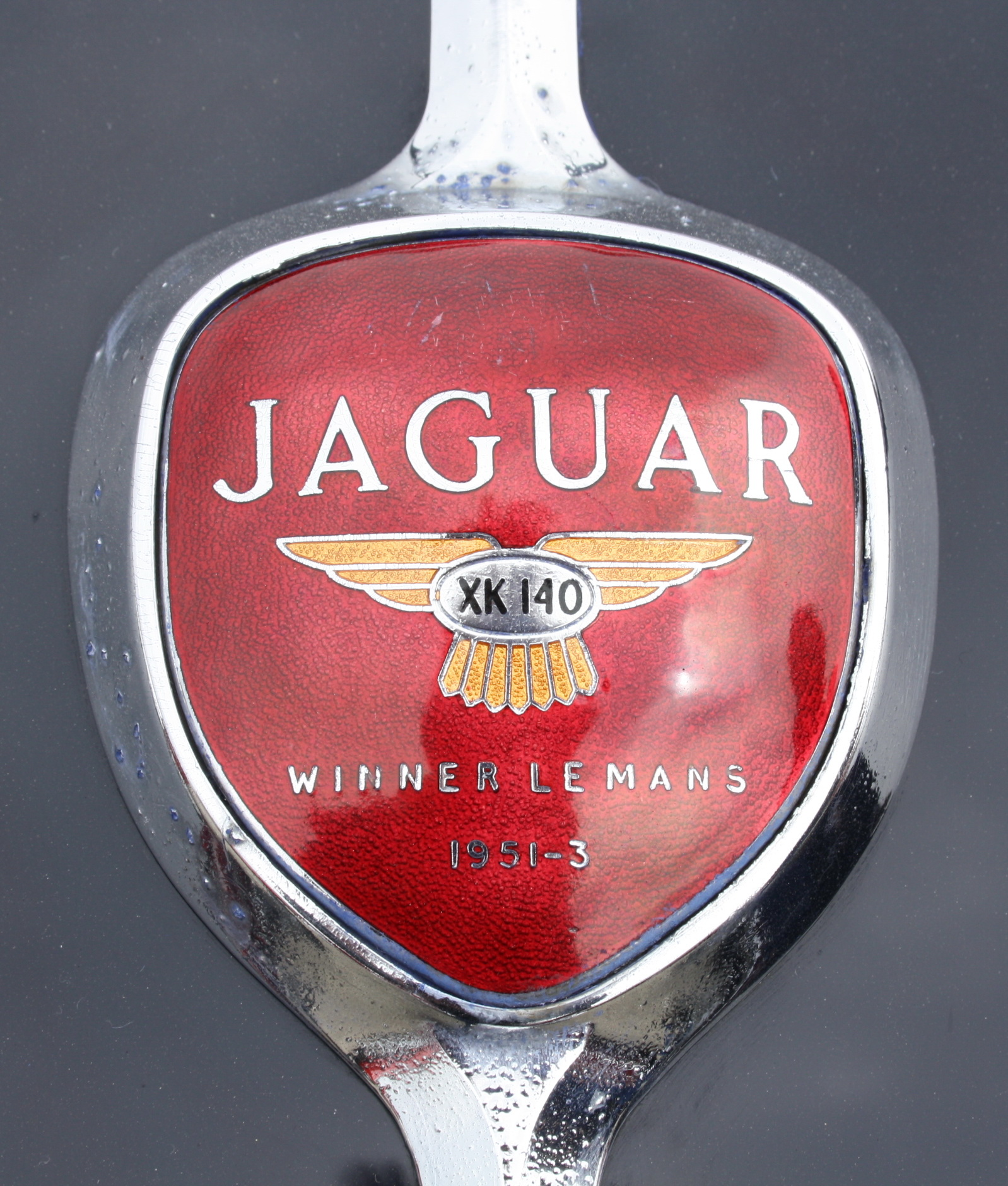
Boot emblem

The grille remained the same size but became a one-piece cast unit with fewer, and broader, vertical bars. The Jaguar badge was incorporated into the grille surround. A chrome trim strip ran along the centre of the bonnet (hood) and boot (trunk) lid. An emblem on the boot lid read "Winner Le Mans 1951–3".

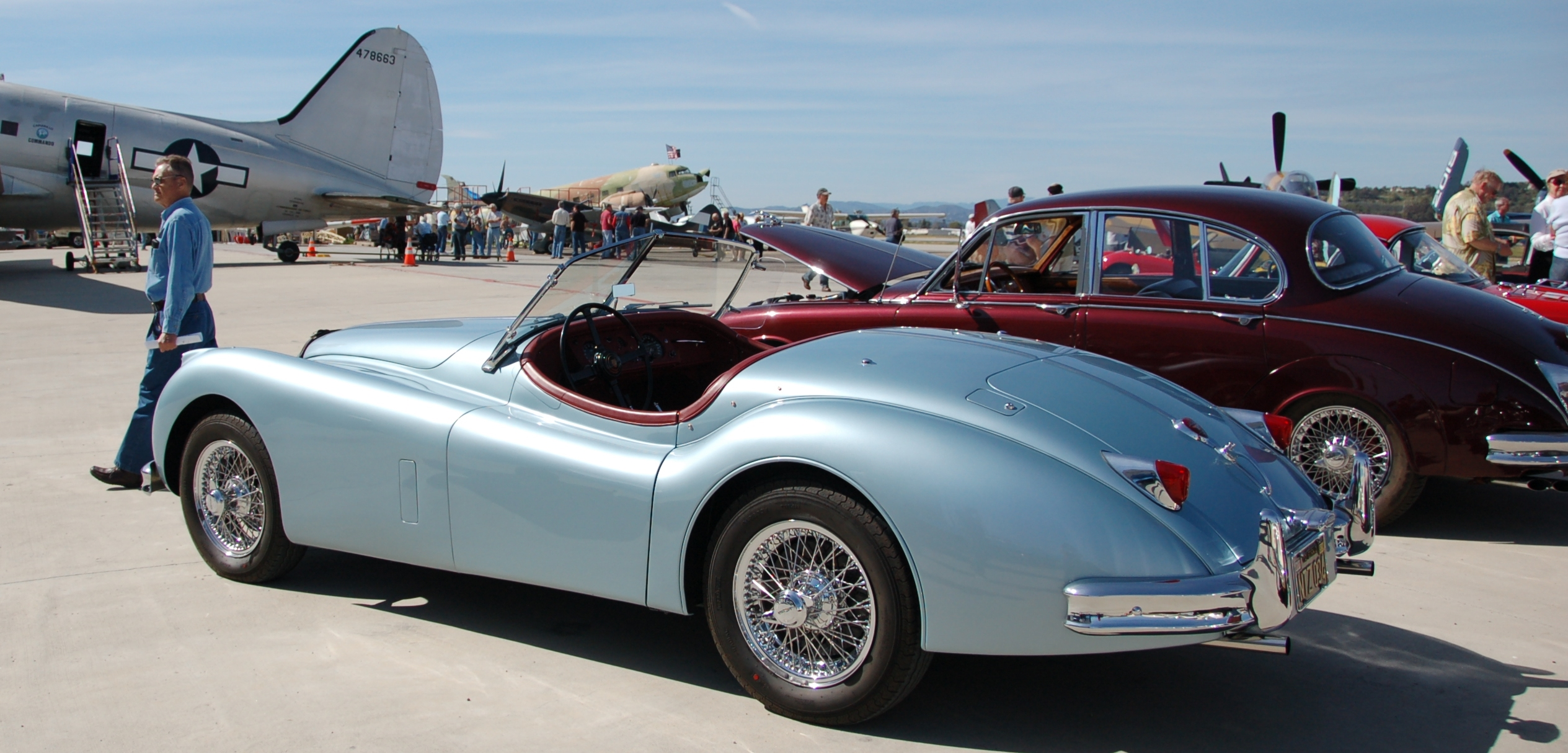
Roadster rear

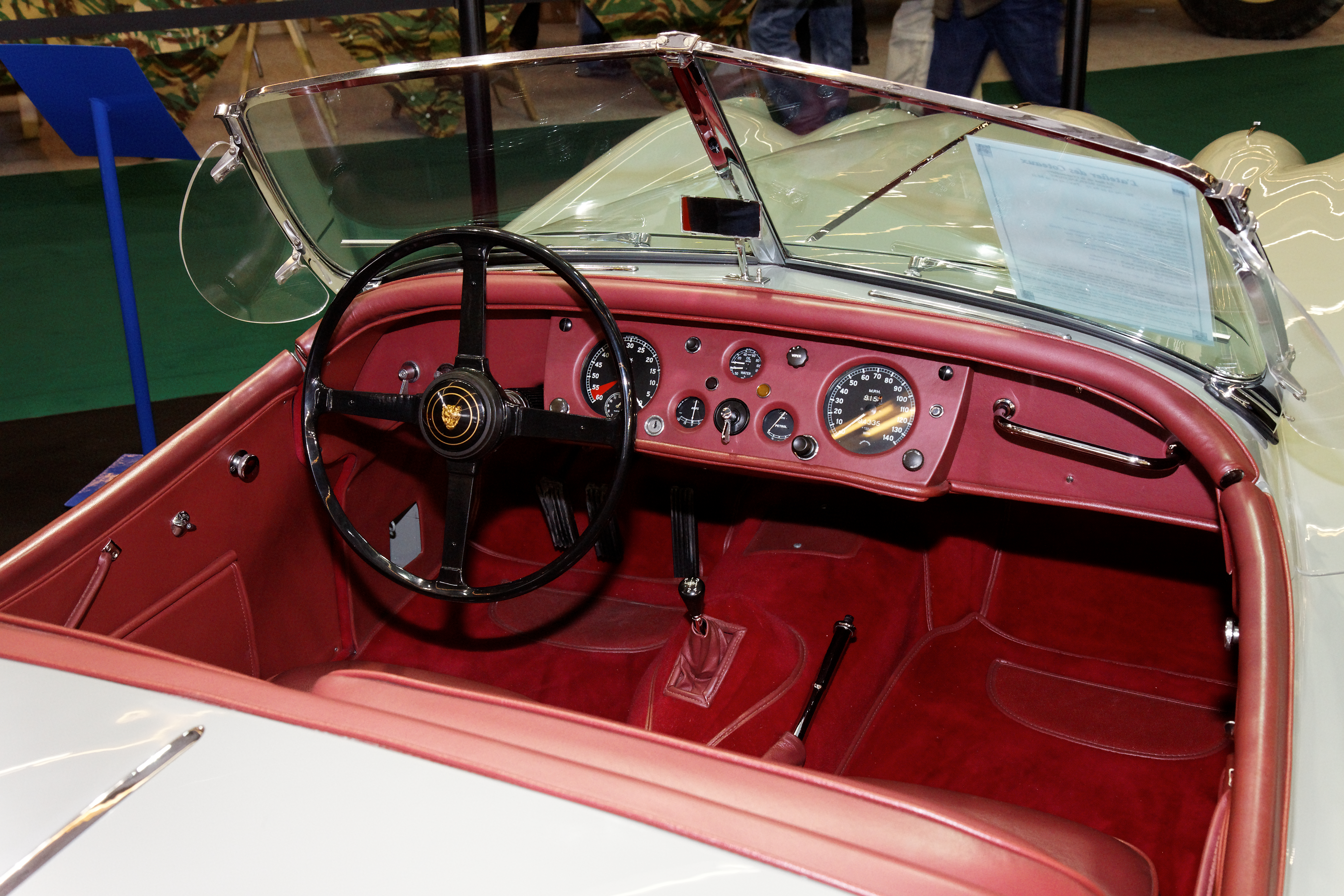
Open two-seater or roadster interior 1956 showing waterproof leather fascia

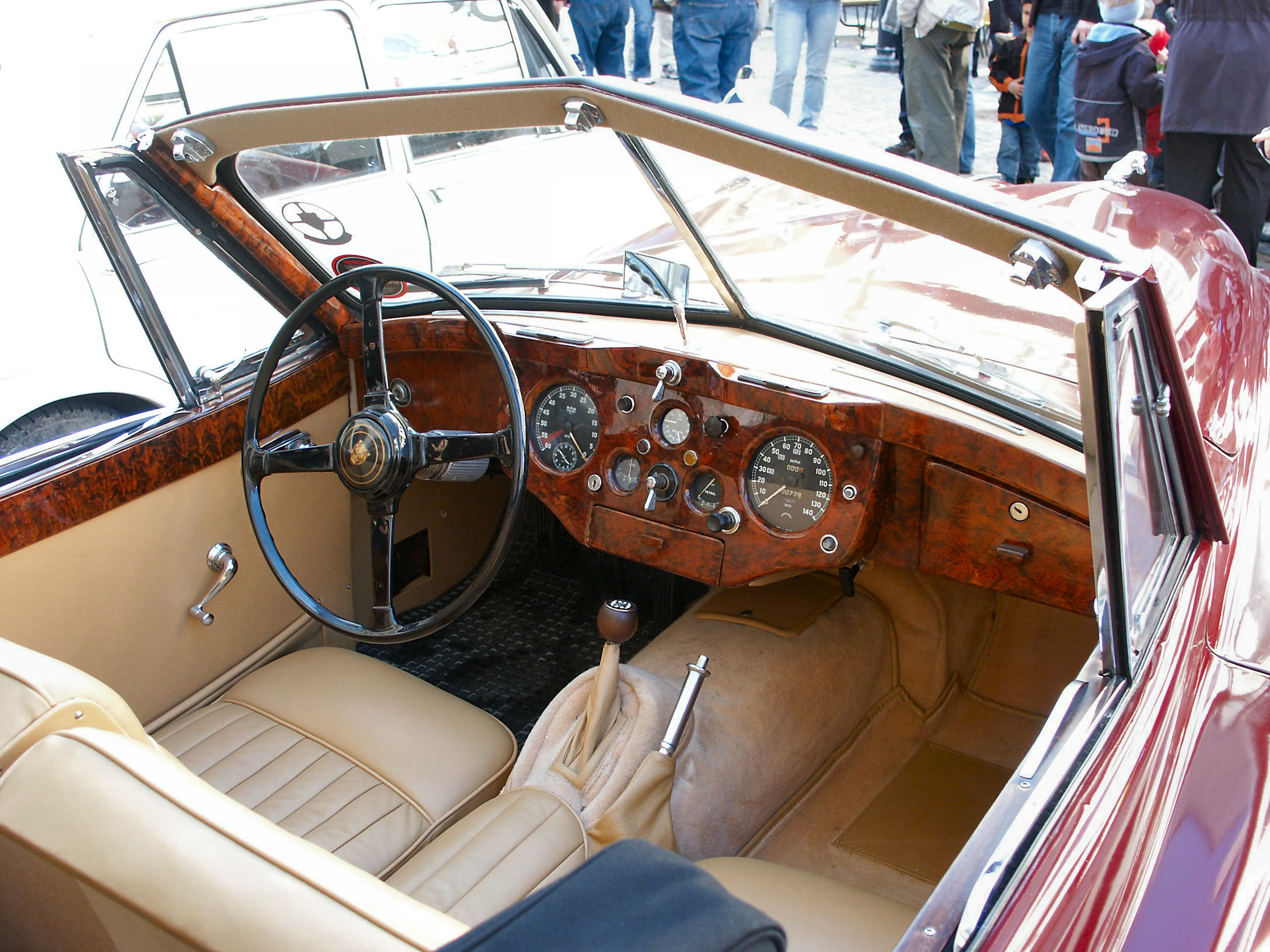
Drophead coupé interior

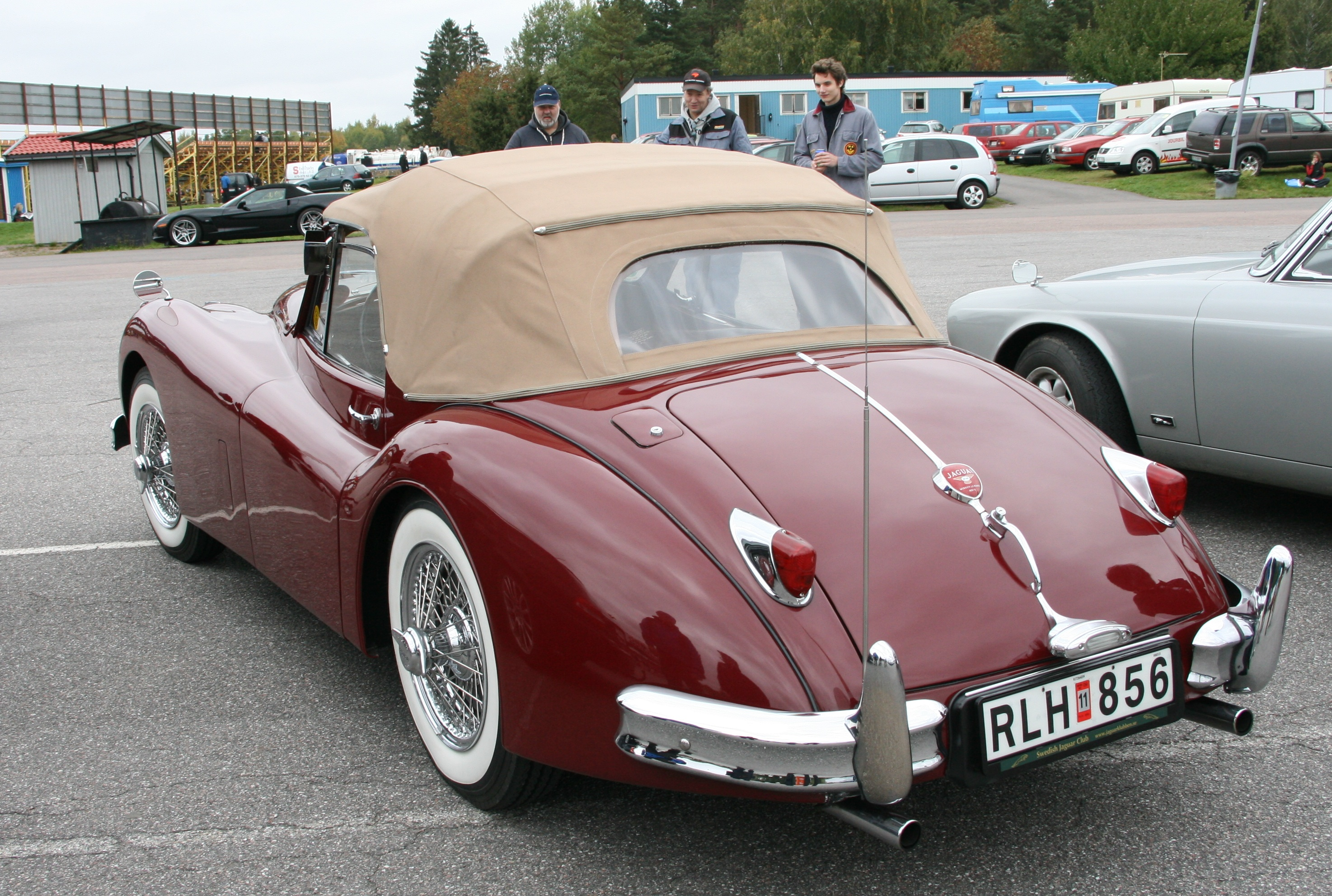
Drophead coupé 1955

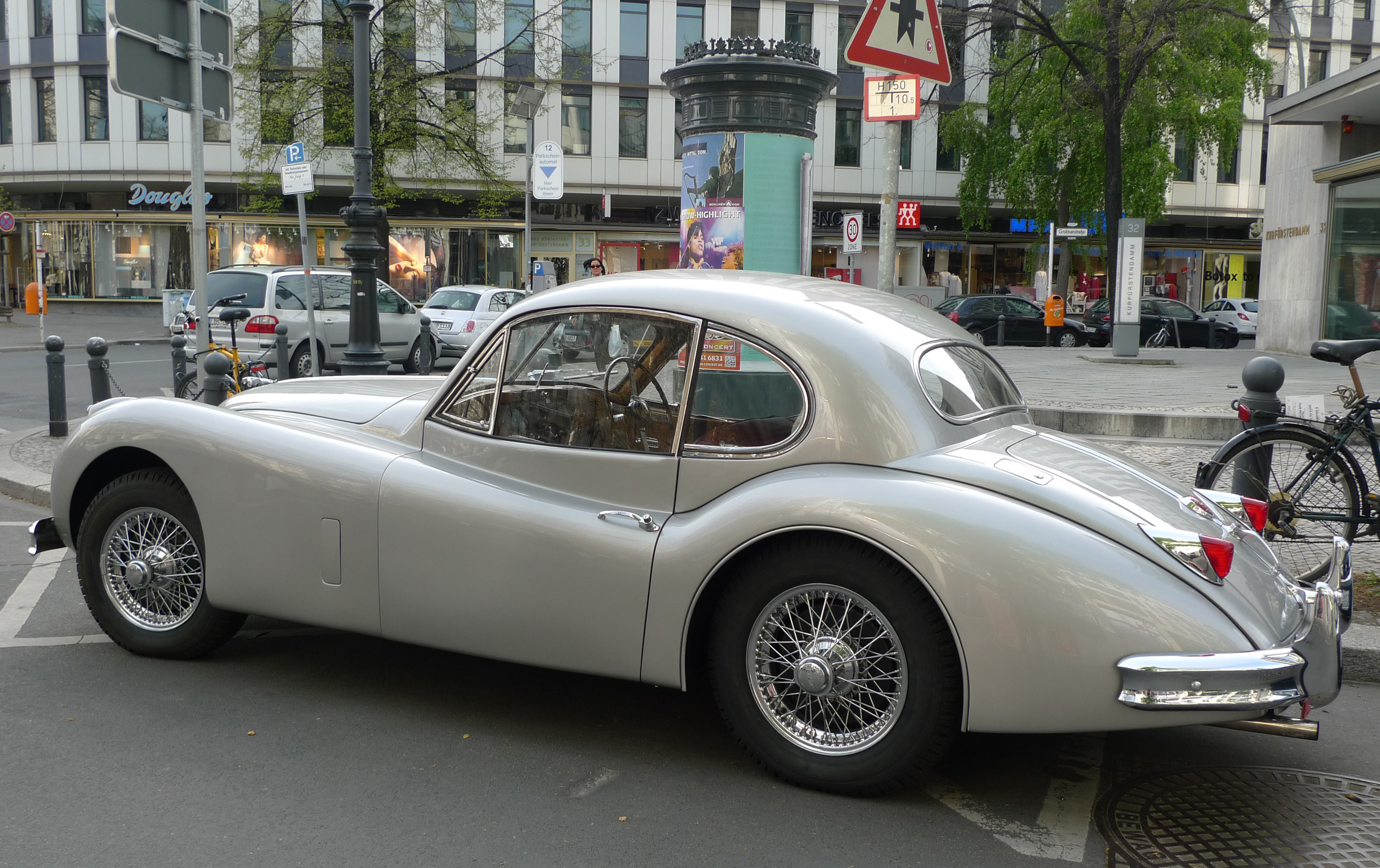
Fixed head coupé

The interior was made more comfortable for taller drivers by moving the engine, firewall and dash forward to give 3 inches (76 mm) more legroom. Two 6-volt batteries, one in each front wing were fitted to the Fixed Head Coupe, but Drop Heads and the Open Two Seater had a single 12-volt battery installed in the front wing on the passenger side.

The XK140 was powered by the William Heynes designed 3.4 litre Jaguar XK double overhead camshaft inline-6 engine, with the Special Equipment modifications from the XK120, which raised the specified power by 10 bhp to 190 bhp (142 kW) gross at 5500 rpm, as standard. The optional C-Type cylinder head carried over from the XK120 catalogue, and produced 210 bhp (157 kW) gross at 5750 rpm.

When fitted with the C-type head, 2-inch sand-cast H8 carburettors, heavier torsion bars and twin exhaust pipes, the car was designated XK140 SE in the UK and XK140 MC in North America.

In 1956 the XK140 became the first Jaguar sports car to be offered with automatic transmission. As with the XK120, wire wheels and dual exhausts were options, with most XK140s imported into the United States having the optional wheels. Cars with the standard disc wheels had spats (fender skirts) over the rear wheel opening. Factory spec 6.00 × 16 inch crossply tyres or optional 185VR16 Pirelli Cinturato CA67 radials could be fitted on either 16 × 5K½ solid wheels or 16 × 5K (special equipment) wire wheels.

== Body styles ==
The OTS, (Open Two Seater) or Roadster as it was designated in America, had a light canvas top that folded out of sight behind the seats. The interior was trimmed in leather and leatherette, including the dash. Like the XK120 Roadster, the XK140 version had removable canvas and plastic side curtains on light alloy barchetta-type doors, and a tonneau cover. The door tops and scuttle panel were cut back by two inches (50 mm) compared to the XK120, to allow a more modern positioning of the steering wheel. The angle of the front face of the doors (A-Post) was changed from 45 degrees to 90 degrees, to make access easier. The windscreen remained removable.

The Drophead Coupé (DHC) had a bulkier lined canvas top that lowered onto the body behind the seats, a fixed windscreen integral with the body, wind-up side windows, and a small rear seat. It also had a walnut-veneered dashboard and door cappings.

The Fixed Head Coupé (FHC) shared the DHC's interior trim and rear seat. The prototype Fixed Head Coupe retained the XK120 Fixed Head roof-profile, with the front wings and doors the same as the Drophead. Production cars had the roof lengthened, windscreen placed further forward, shorter front wings, and longer doors, all resulting in easier entry and more interior space and legroom.

== Engine specifications ==
XK 140 Engines
Model	Years	Displacement	Configuration	Bore/Stroke	Carburettor	Power
XK 140 3.4	1954–1957	3442 cc	DOHC Straight-6	83 mm x 106 mm	Double SU H6	190 bhp (142 kW; 193 PS) @ 5500 rpm
XK 140 3.4 SE (C-Type Head/"MC" in USA)	1954–1957	3442 cc	DOHC Straight-6	83 mm x 106 mm	Double SU H6	210 bhp (157 kW; 213 PS) @ 5750 rpm

== Performance ==
A stock XK-140 SE could achieve a top speed of 120–125 mph (193–201 km/h). Road & Track's XK-140 MC test in June 1955 recorded a best two-way average of 120.3 mph (193.6 km/h). Best one-way run was 121.1 mph (194.9 km/h). Sports Cars Illustrated's test of the same model in Aug 1957 had a fastest two-way average of 121 mph (195 km/h). Their best one-way run was 124 mph (200 km/h). Karl Ludvigsen's test published in Sports Car World (July 1957) had the same results as the SCI test.

Acceleration times from 0–60 mph (97 km/h) were 8.4 seconds and 9.1 seconds respectively. Only the R&T test tried 0–100 mph (161 km/h) which took 26.5 seconds. Standing 1/4 mile (~400 m) times were 16.6 seconds (82 mph (132 km/h) approx) and 16.9 seconds (86 mph (138 km/h)).

== Coachbuilt versions ==
The Jaguar XK140 Zagato Coupé was built for Guido Modiano (a personal friend of Elio and Ugo Zagato) whose XK140 was damaged in an accident. Zagato displayed the car at the 1957 Paris Motor Show, hoping to sell more. Two more were built, although they were XK150s.

Jaguar XK140 Zagato Coupé

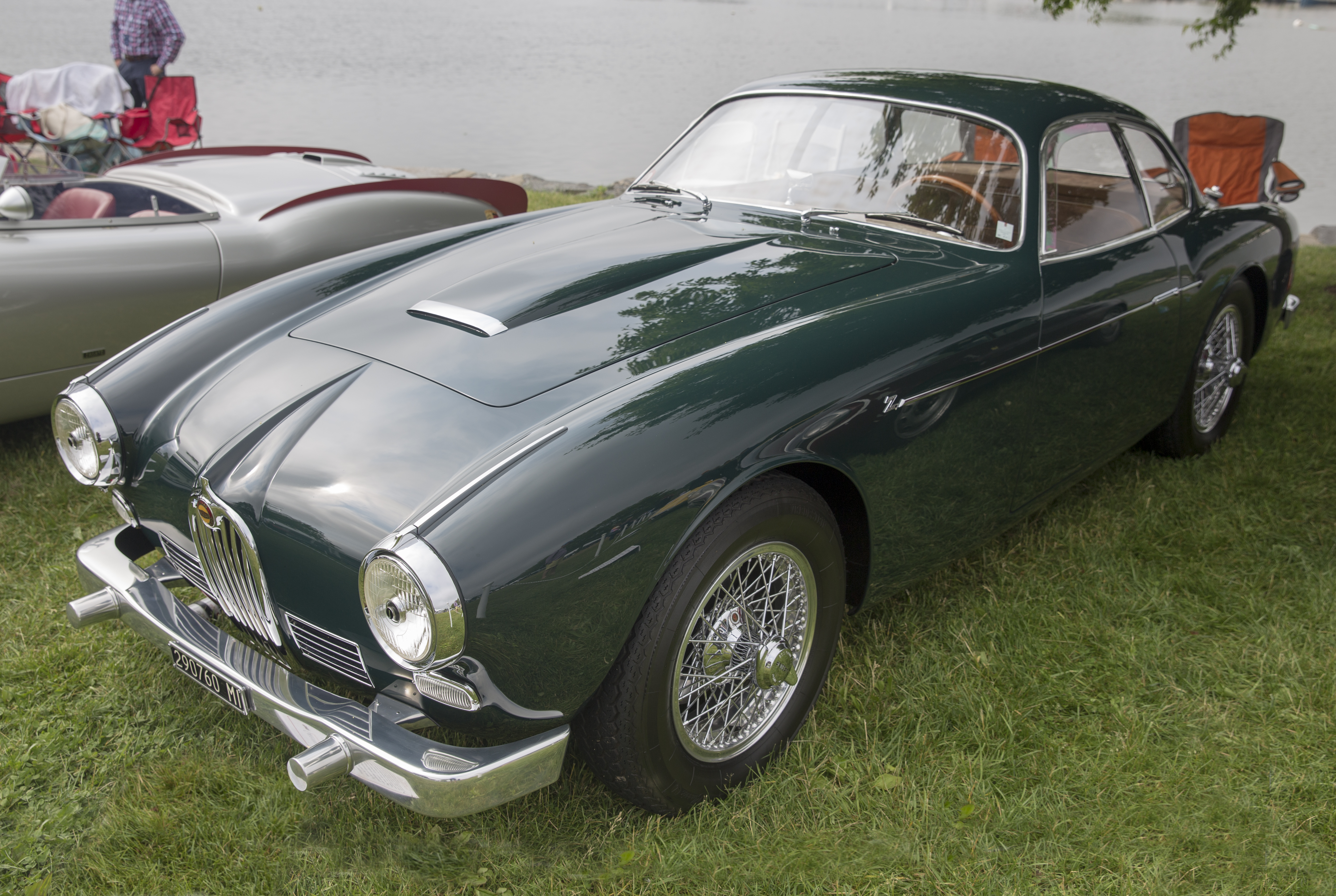

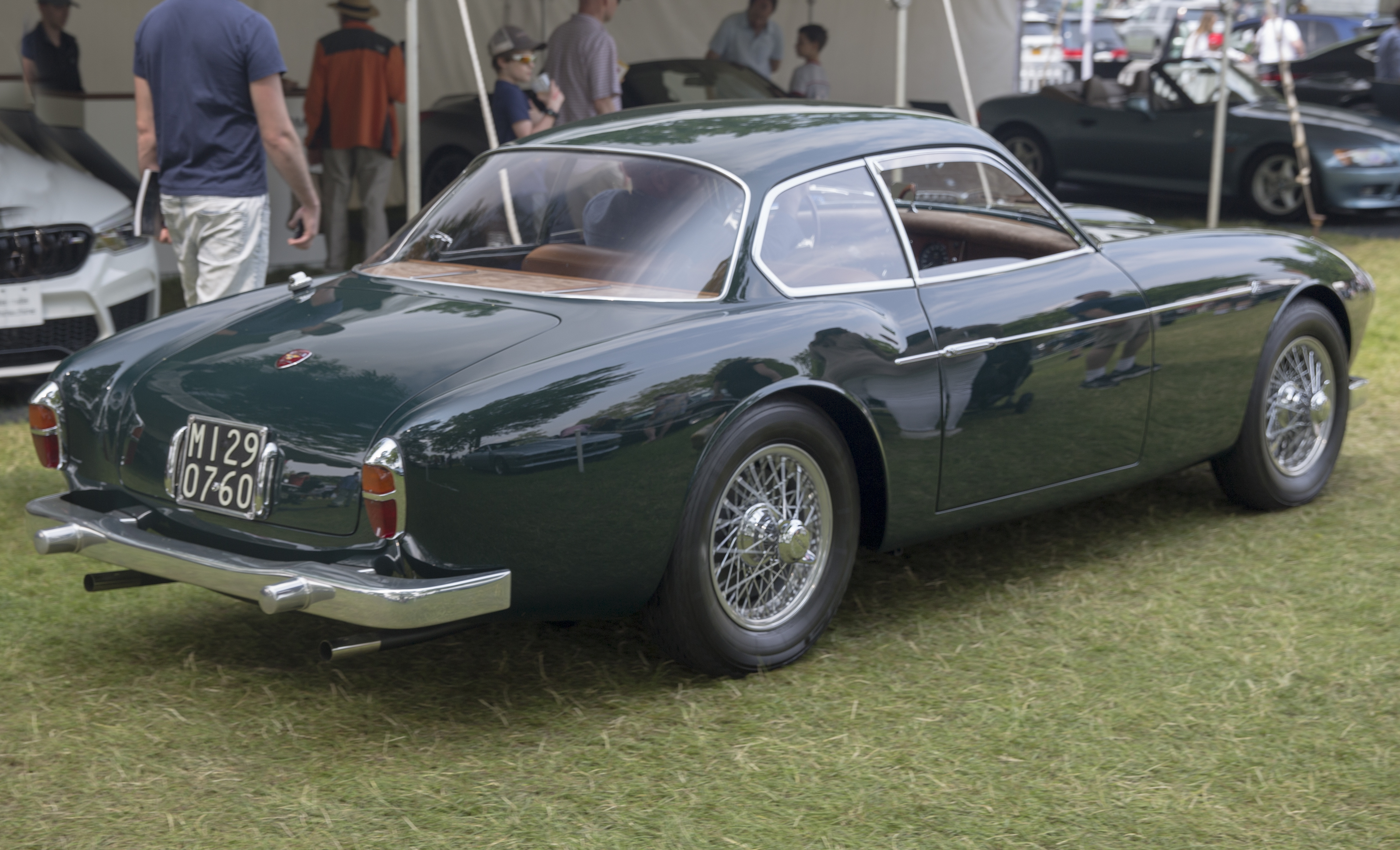

The Jaguar XK140 Coupé by Ghia was designed by Giovanni Michelotti in 1955. Three cars have reportedly been built.

Jaguar XK140 Coupé by Ghia

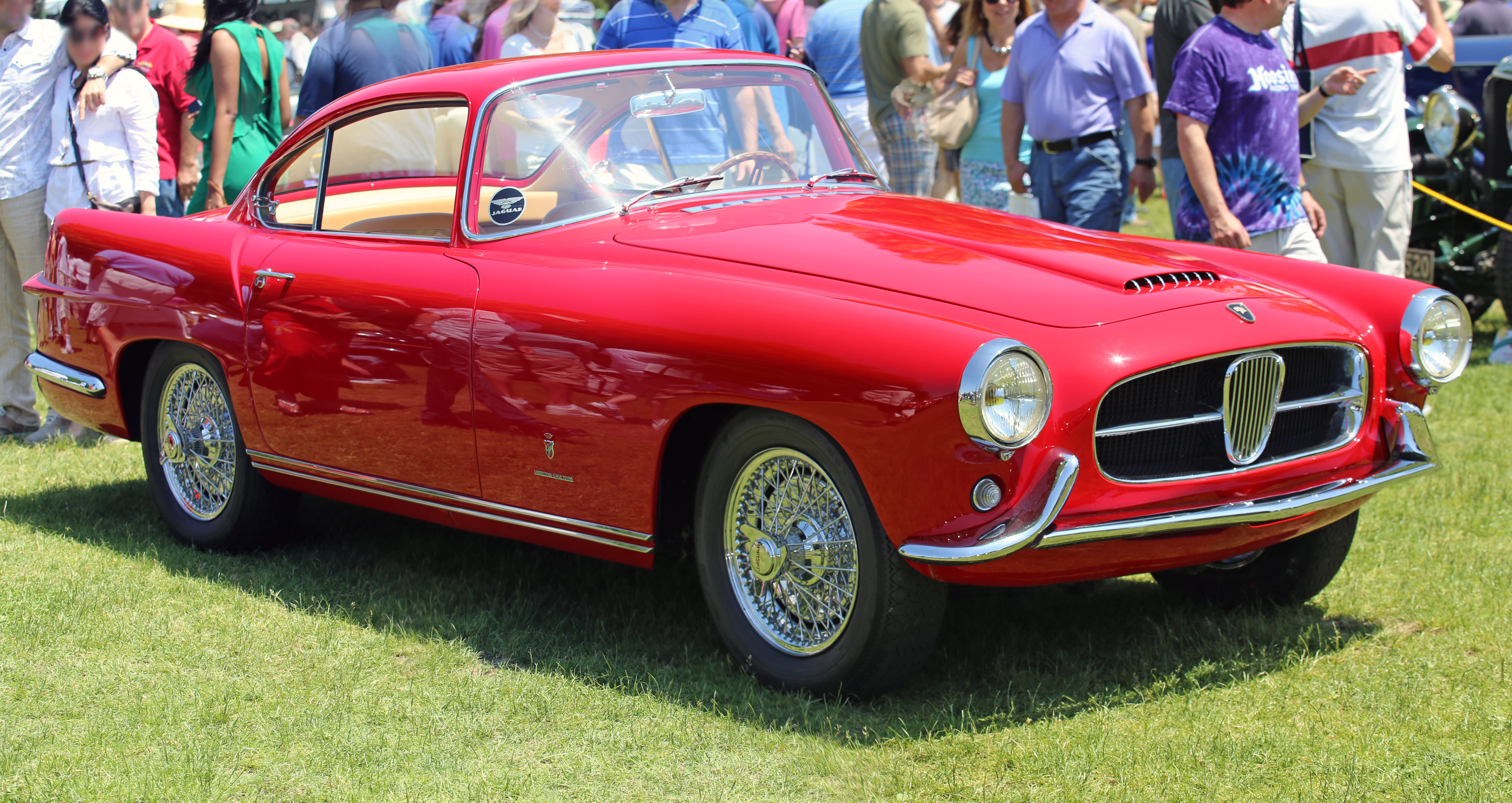

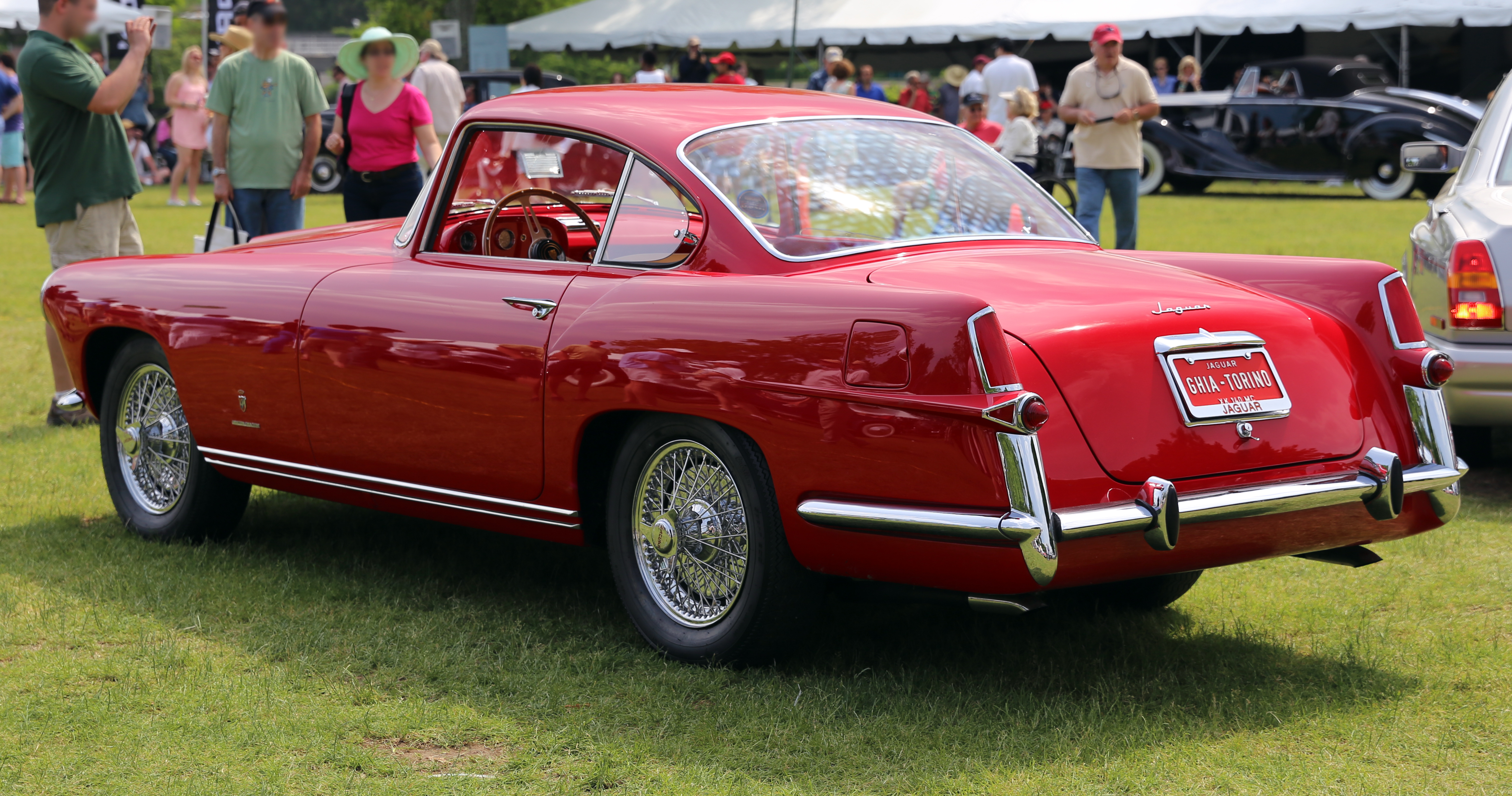

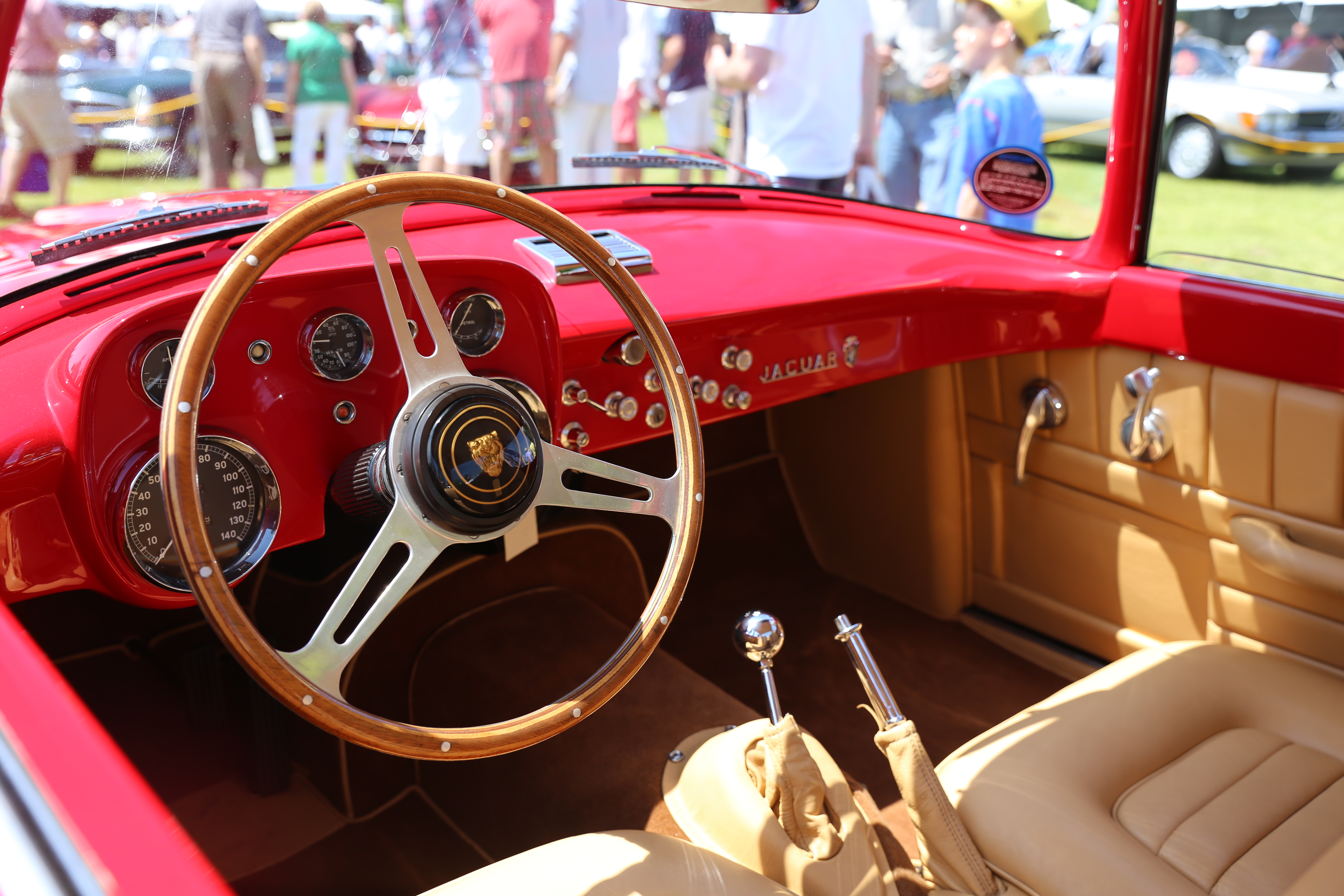

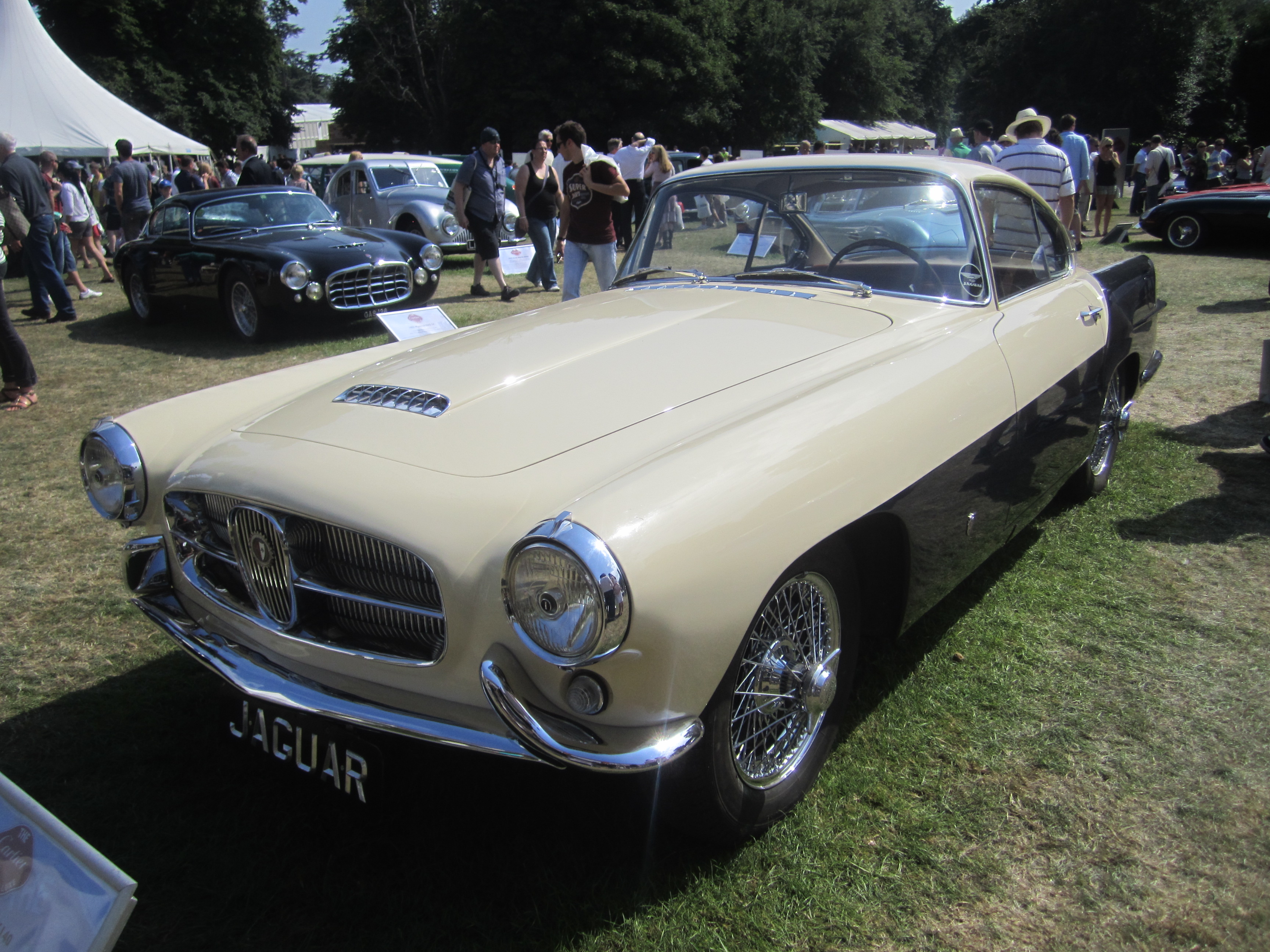

== Production ==
Chassis numbers as supplied by Jaguar Heritage Trust

	Cars			Chassis numbers used		
	RHD	LHD	Total	RHD	LHD	Total
Open two-seater	73	3276	3349	74	3282	3356
Fixed-head	839	1959	2798	843	1966	2809
Drop-head	480	2310	2790	480	2311	2791
Total	1392	7545	8937	1397	7559	8956
