= Cooper Mk.V =

Series of Formula 3 cars

The Cooper Mk.V, is a series of three different Formula 3 cars, designed, developed and built by Cooper Cars in 1951. Like its predecessor, it used a 500 cc (31 cu in) JA Prestwich Industries (JAP) single-cylinder engine, or a 1,000–1,100 cc (61–67 cu in) JAP V-2 engine. The first version was the short-wheelbase Cooper T15; which featured a box-section chassis frame, detachable body panels, and a rack-and-pinion steering system. The second version was the long wheelbase Cooper T16, which featured a lengthened wheelbase to be able to equip the larger 1 L (61 cu in) engine. And the third and final version, the Cooper T17; which was a special streamliner version land speed record attempt car for speed record attempts, and sometimes, used for fast road racing circuits.
