= Sander Rozema =

Dutch footballer

Personal information
- Full name: Sander Rozema
- Date of birth: 19 June 1987 (age 39)
- Place of birth: Roden, Netherlands
- Height: 1.82 m (6 ft 0 in)
- Position: Midfielder

Youth career
- Nieuw Roden
- 1998–2000: GRC Groningen
- 2000–2006: FC Groningen

Senior career*
Years	Team	Apps	(Gls)
2007–2008	FC Groningen	1	(0)
2008	→ Zwolle (loan)	0	(0)
2008–2013	Veendam	115	(6)
2013–2017	Emmen	95	(3)
- * Club domestic league appearances and goals as of 13 May 2017

Sander Rozema (born 19 June 1987) is a Dutch former professional footballer. He formerly played as a midfielder for FC Groningen, FC Zwolle, SC Veendam and FC Emmen.

Rozema retired in 2017 after struggling with recurrent knee injuries.
