= Jaguar XK150 =

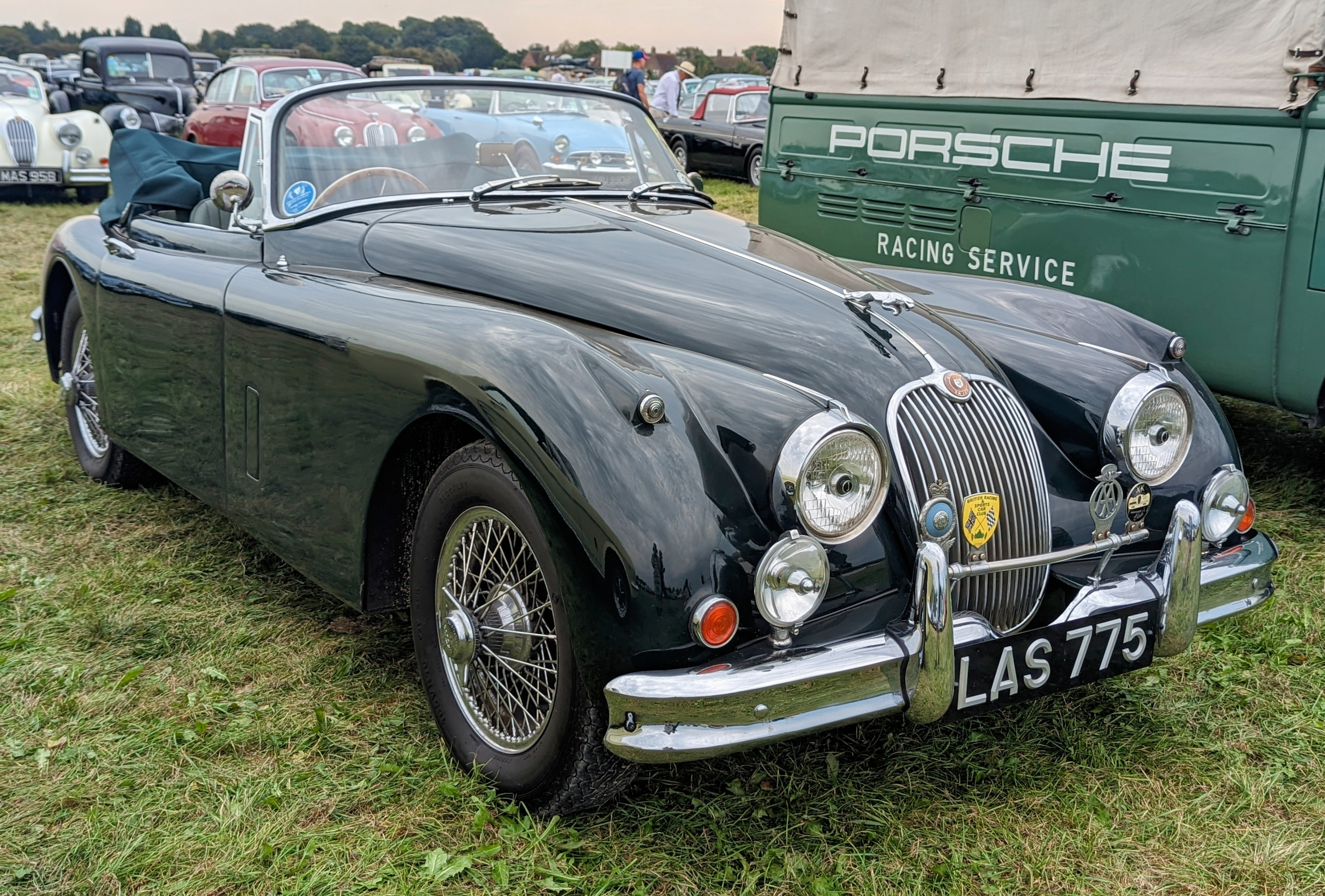
- 1959 Jaguar XK150 drophead coupé

Overview
- Manufacturer: Jaguar Cars
- Production: May 1957 – March 1961
- Assembly: United Kingdom: Coventry

Body and chassis
- Class: Sports car
- Body style: 2–3 seater coupé 2–3 seater convertible or drophead coupé 2 seater roadster or open two-seater
- Layout: FR layout

Powertrain
- Engine: 3442 cc (210 CID) I6; 3781 cc I6
- Transmission: 4-speed manual 3-speed automatic

Dimensions
- Wheelbase: 2,591 mm (102.0 in)
- Length: 4,496 mm (177.0 in)
- Width: 1,580 mm (62.2 in)
- Curb weight: 2,968 lb (1,346 kg)

Chronology
- Predecessor: Jaguar XK140
- Successor: Jaguar E-Type

The Jaguar XK150 is a sports car produced by Jaguar between 1957 and 1961 as the successor to the XK140.

Initially it was only available in fixed head coupé (FHC) and drophead coupé (DHC) versions. The roadster without full weather equipment which had begun the XK line was launched as the XK150 OTS (open two-seater) in 1958. Minimal rear seats were fitted in the coupés. The open two-seater was fitted for the first time with wind-up windows in taller high-silled doors, but retained the very simple folding roof of its predecessors.

== History ==
Announced in its home market in May 1957 the XK150 bore a family resemblance to the XK120 and XK140 but was radically revised. Most visibly, a one-piece windscreen replaced the split screen, and the wing line was carried higher and more streamlined at the doors. The widened bonnet opened down to the wings, and on the coupés the windscreen frame was moved forward 4 inches (102 mm) to make passenger access easier. The car was available in Red, Pearl Grey, White, Indigo Blue, Claret, Cotswold Blue, Black, Mist Grey, Sherwood Green, Carmen Red, British Racing Green, Cornish Grey, and Imperial Maroon.

The XK150's dashboard came trimmed in leather, with walnut optional on all models. On the early drophead coupés, the aluminium centre dash panel, which was discontinued after June 1958, had an X pattern engraving similar to the early 3.8 E-Type. Thinner doors gave more interior space. A little red light reminded the driver that the front parking lights, located atop the wings (fenders), were on.

Suspension and chassis were very similar to the XK140, with manual-only rack and pinion steering. The 3.4 litre DOHC straight-6 XK engine was similar to the XK140's, but a new "B" type cylinder head raised power to 180 SAE bhp at 5750 rpm.

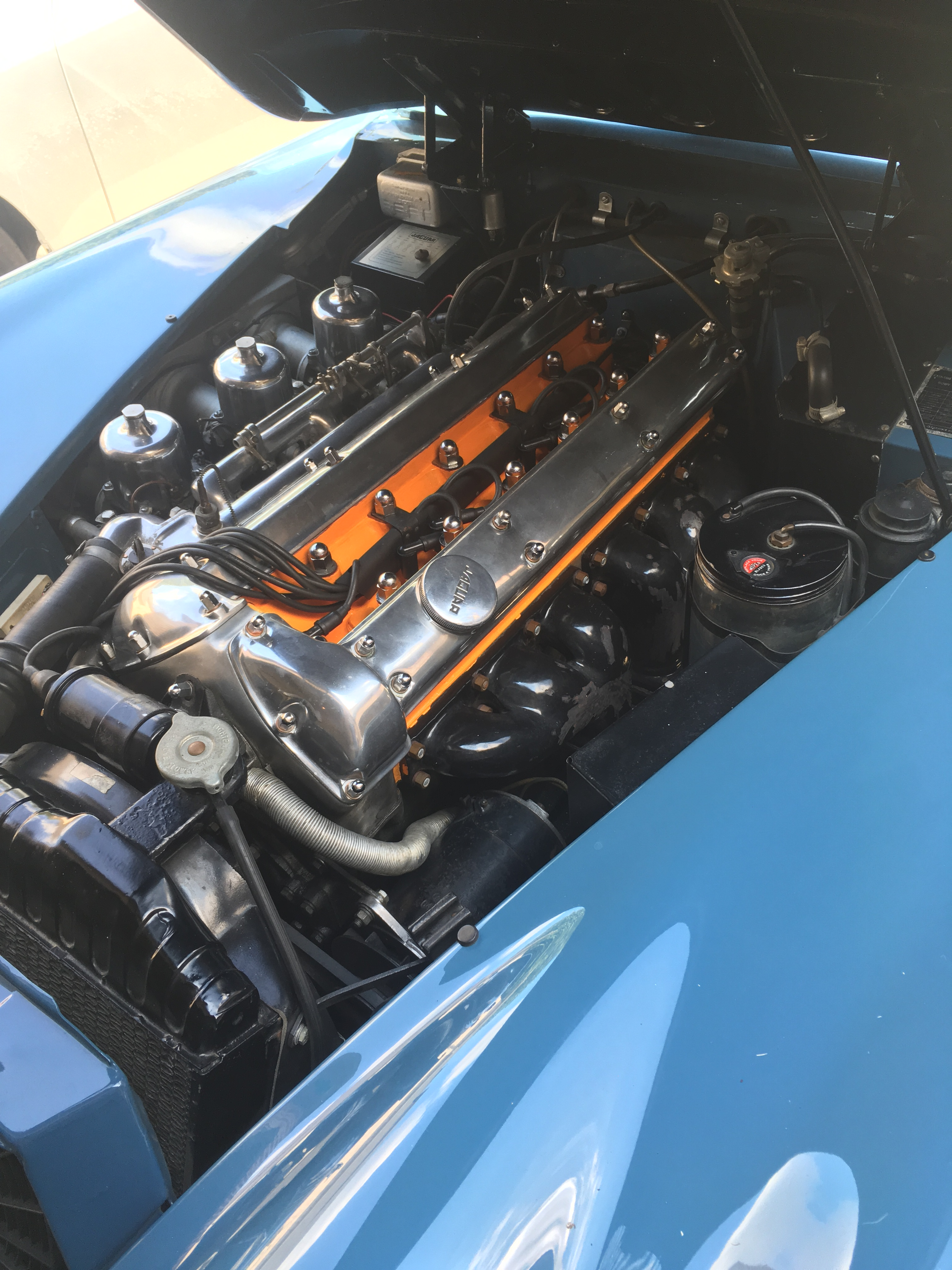
XK150 S 3.4L XK engine with orange paint used on S models with "straight port" cylinder heads fitted with three carburettors

The first closed and convertible XK150s were slower than their predecessors. After a twelve-month delay caused by the February 1957 factory fire, this deficit was corrected in the spring of 1958 with the March release of special equipment models fitted with disc brakes and more powerful SE engine. Twin 1.75-inch (44 mm) SU HD6 carburettors and a modified B type cylinder head with larger exhaust valves improved performance to 210 SAE bhp at 5500 rpm. While most export cars were SE models, a third option for the open two-seater featured an "S" engine with three 2-inch (51 mm) SU HD8 carburettors and a straight-port cylinder head boosting power to a claimed 250 SAE bhp.

In 1960 the 220 hp (164 kW; 223 PS) 3.8 litre engine fitted in the full-sized luxury Mark IX saloon since October 1958 became available. It was tuned to produce up to 265 hp (198 kW; 269 PS) in S models and propel an XK150 to 135 mph (217 km/h) and from 0–60 mph in around 7.0 seconds. Fuel economy was 18mpg. Four-wheel Dunlop 12 in (305 mm) disc brakes appeared for the first time as an option. Factory specification 6.00 × 16 inch Dunlop Road Speed tyres or optional 185VR16 Pirelli Cinturato CA67 radials could be fitted on either 16 × 5K½ solid wheels or optional 16 × 5K wire wheels.

The E-Type replacement was announced in the middle of March 1961.

== Production ==
Production ended in October 1960 with 9,382 vehicles, including 2,265 Roadsters open-two seater OTS, 4,445 Fixed head coupés FHC and 2,672 drop head coupés DHC.

XK150 1957–1960
| Model | Numbers |
|---|---|
| Roadster OTS | 2,265 |
| Fixed Head Coupe FHC | 4,445 |
| Drophead Coupe DHC | 2,672 |
| Total | 9,382 |

== Engine specifications ==
XK 150 ENGINES
| Model | Years | Displacement | Configuration | Bore/Stroke | Carburettor | Power |
|---|---|---|---|---|---|---|
| XK 150 3.4 | 1957–1960 | 3442cc | DOHC Straight-6 | 83 mm x 106 mm | Double SU HD6 | 190 bhp (142 kW; 193 PS) @ 5500 rpm |
| XK 150 3.4 SE | 1957–1960 | 3442cc | DOHC Straight-6 | 83 mm x 106 mm | Double SU HD6 | 210 bhp (157 kW; 213 PS) @ 5500 rpm |
| XK 150 3.4 S | 1958–1960 | 3442 cc | DOHC Straight-6 | 83 mm x 106 mm | Triple SU HD8 | 250 bhp (186 kW; 253 PS) @ 5500 rpm |
| XK 150 3.8 SE | 1959–1960 | 3781 cc | DOHC Straight-6 | 87 mm x 106 mm | Double SU HD6 | 220 bhp (164 kW; 223 PS) @ 5500 rpm |
| XK 150 3.8 S | 1959–1960 | 3781 cc | DOHC Straight-6 | 87 mm x 106 mm | Triple SU HD8 | 265 bhp (198 kW; 269 PS) @ 5500 rpm |

== Performance ==
A 250 bhp 3.4 litre XK150S fixed-head coupé with limited slip differential was tested by The Motor in 1959. It had a top speed of 132 mph (212 km/h) and could accelerate from 0–60 mph (97 km/h) in 7.8 seconds. Fuel consumption of 22.0 miles per imperial gallon (12.8 L/100 km; 18.3 mpg_{‑US}) was recorded. The test car cost £2110 including taxes of £623. It was at the time the fastest closed car the magazine had ever subjected to a full road test.

The bhp figures quoted are SAE gross and not SAE net horsepower ratings. In comparison, the 3.4L 1954 Jaguar 'D'-type with racing camshafts, larger 1.875in. inlet valves, and 3 dual-choke Weber carburettors was rated at 246 bhp.

== Coachbuilt version ==
=== Jaguar XK150 by Bertone ===
A total of 3 bare chassis were sent to Bertone in Turin to be bodied as prototype fixed-head coupés. They were reportedly meant to be the replacement for the XK150 and wore an "XKE" badge on their rear flanks. Jaguar ended up replacing the XK150 with the E-Type.

Jaguar XK150 By Bertone

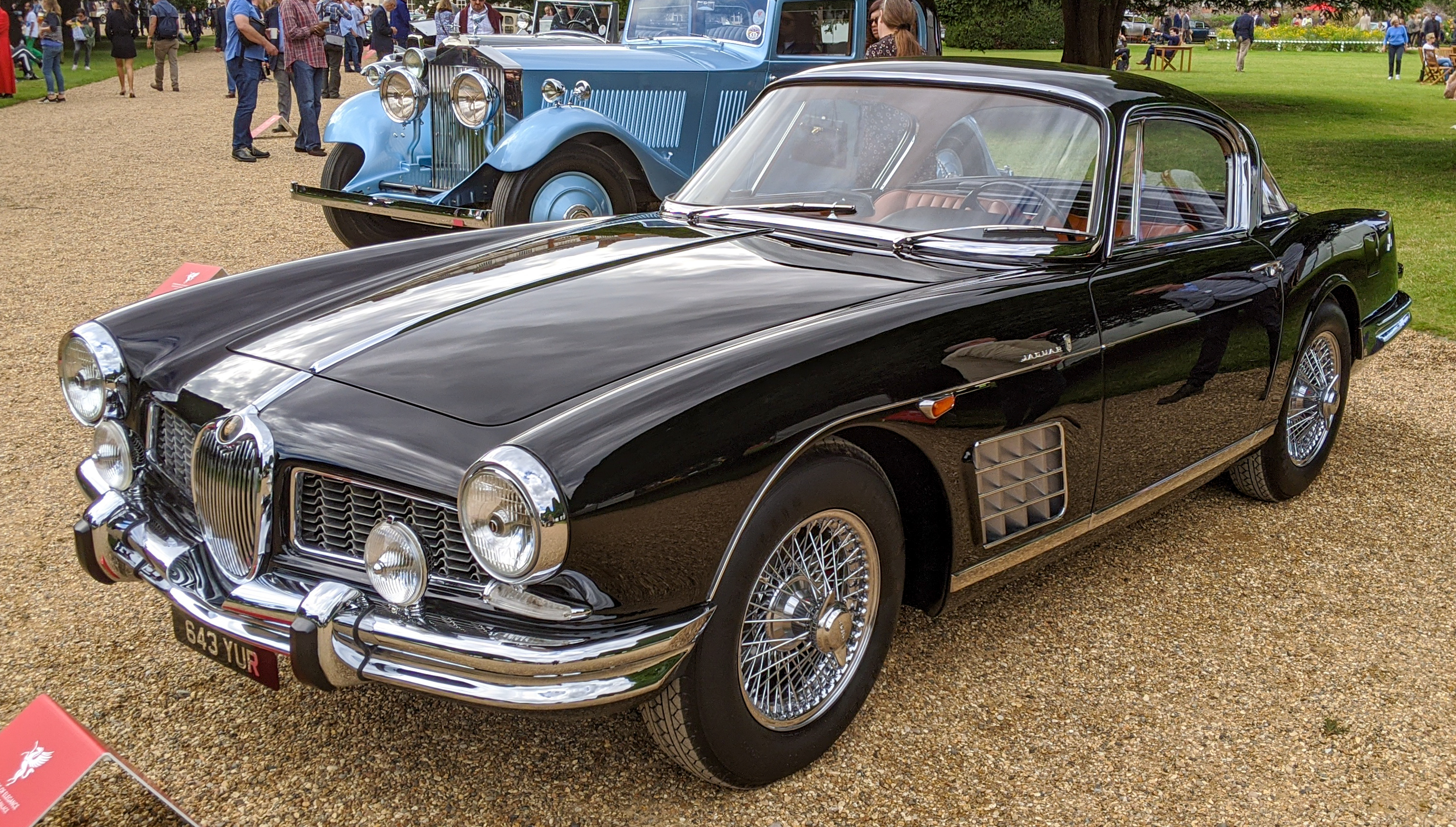

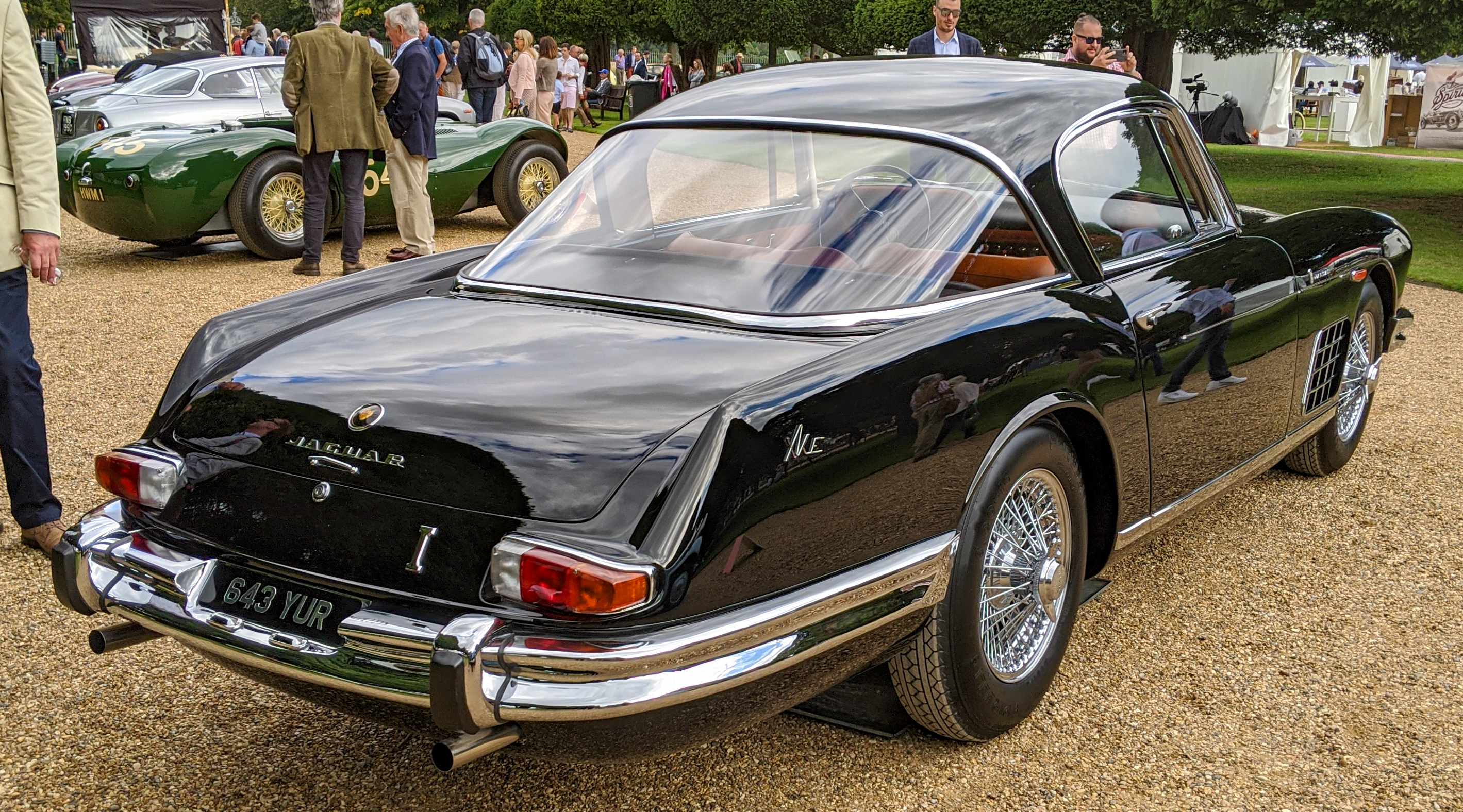

== Gallery ==
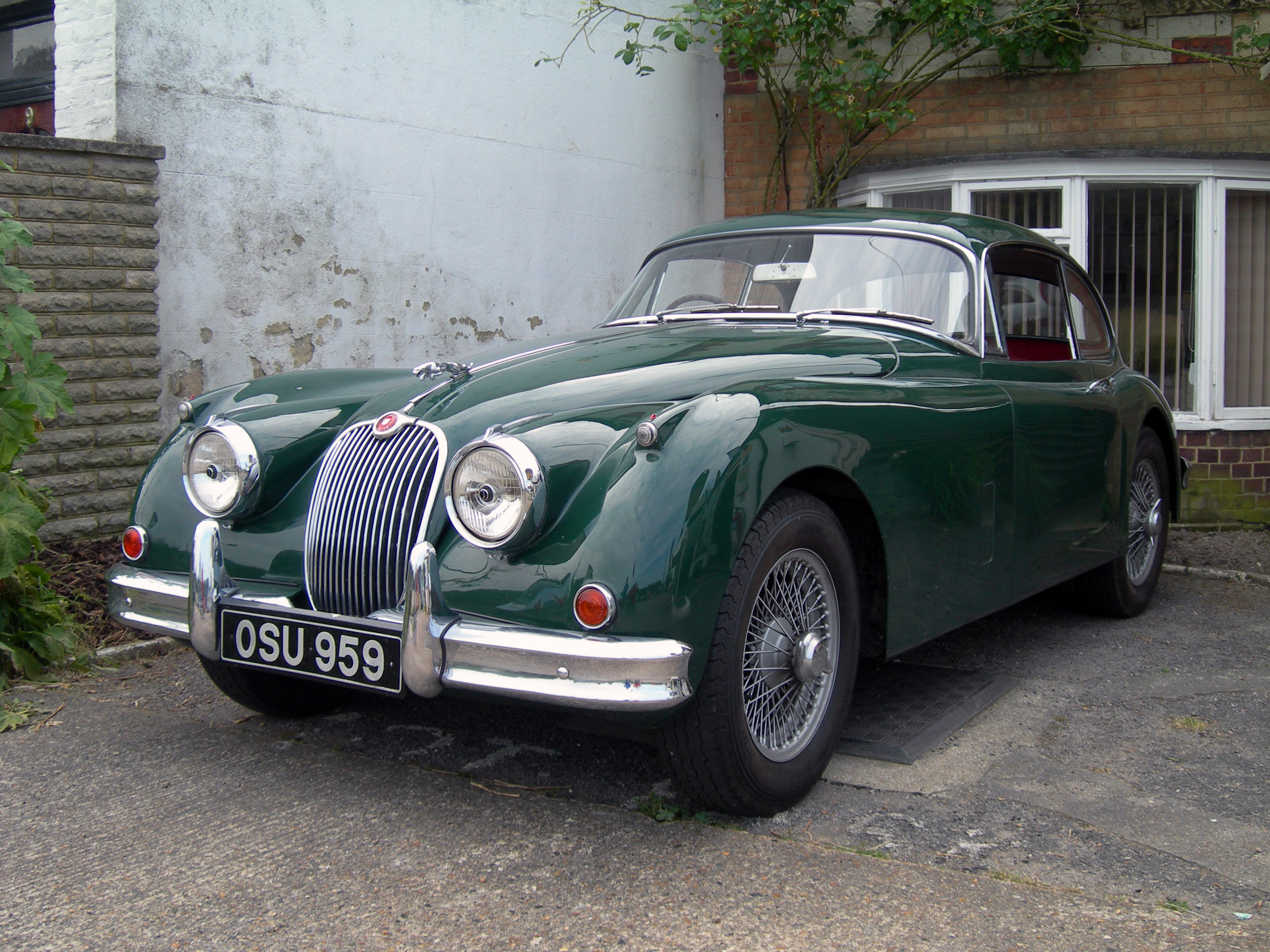
1961 fixed head coupé

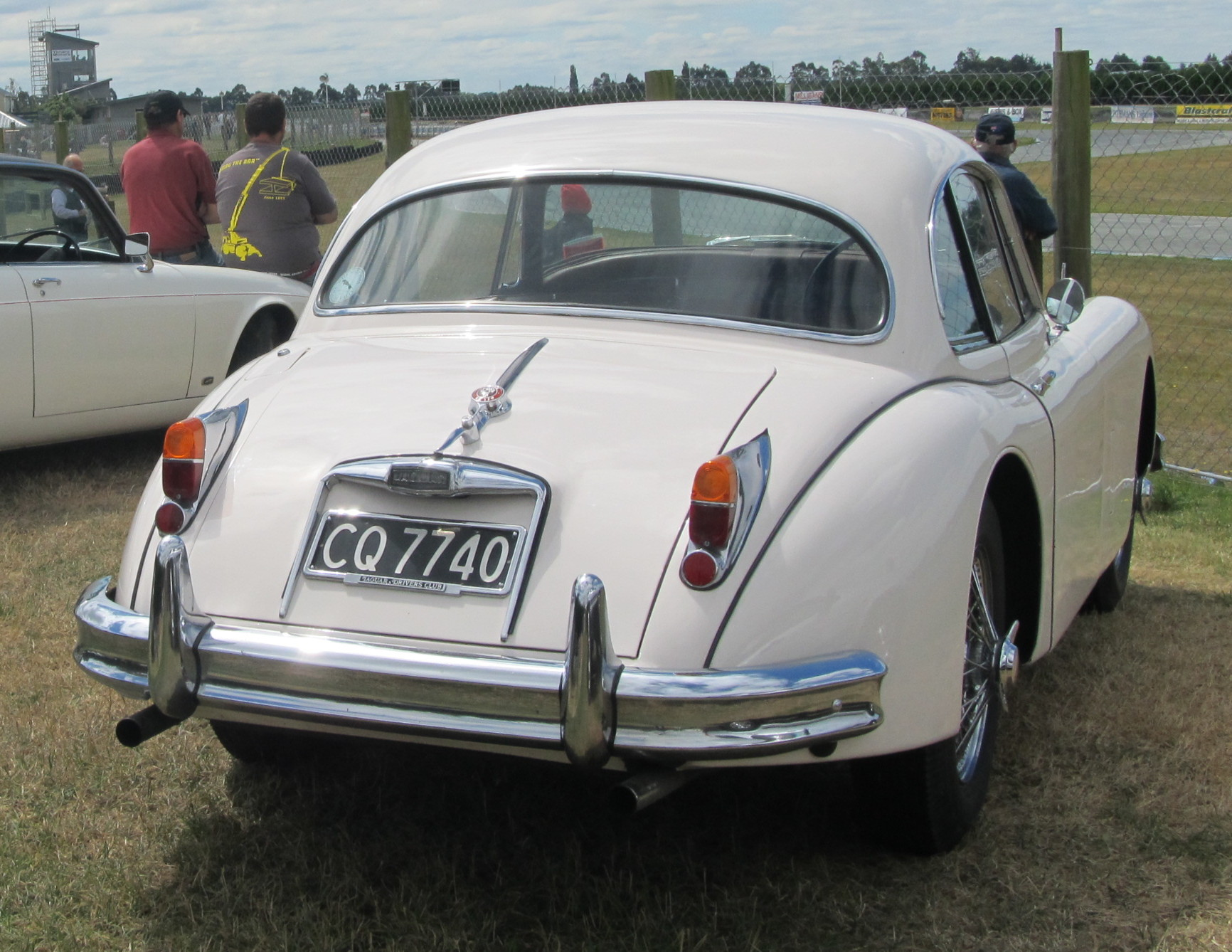
1961 fixed head coupé

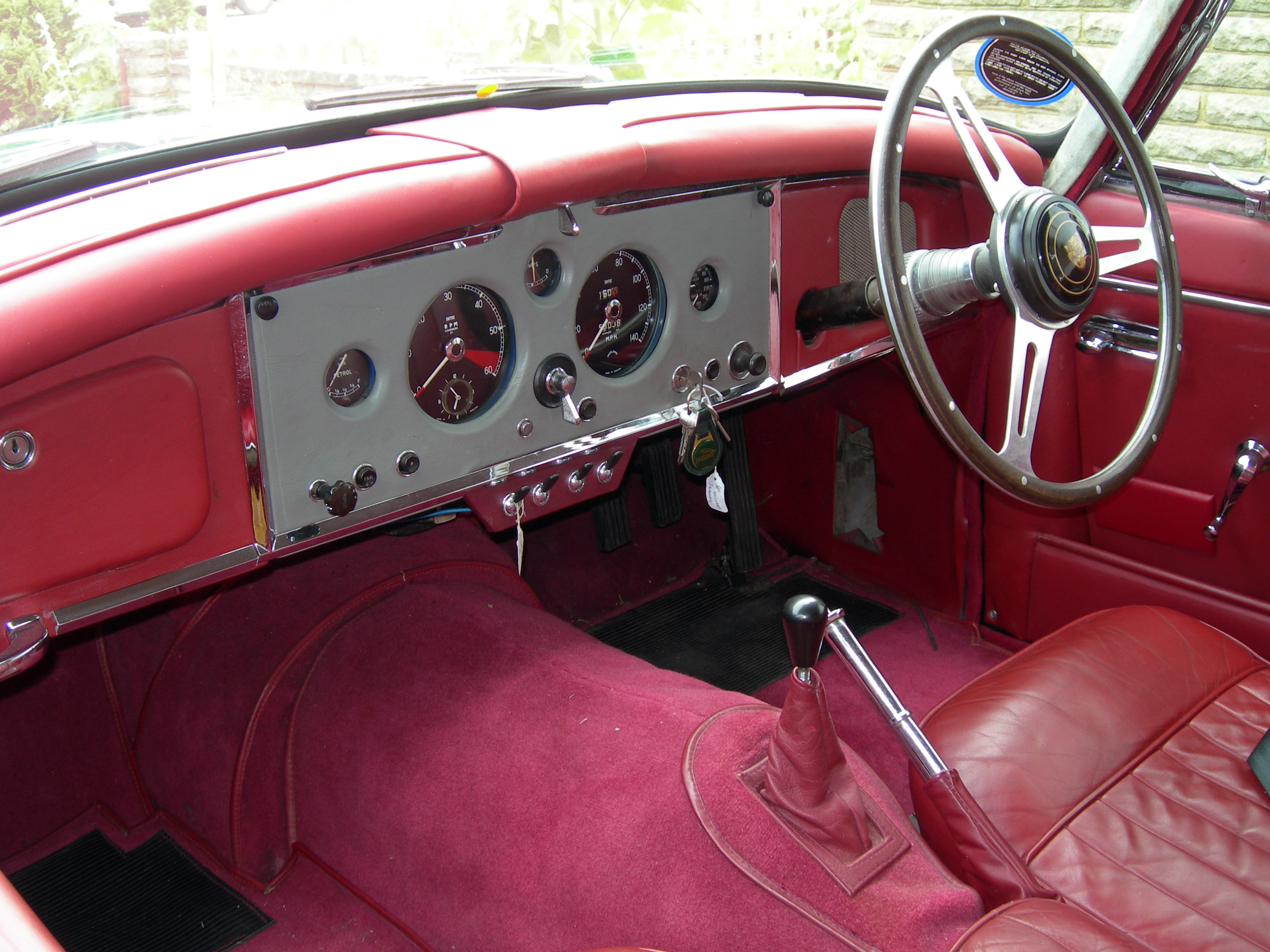
1961 fixed head coupé dash

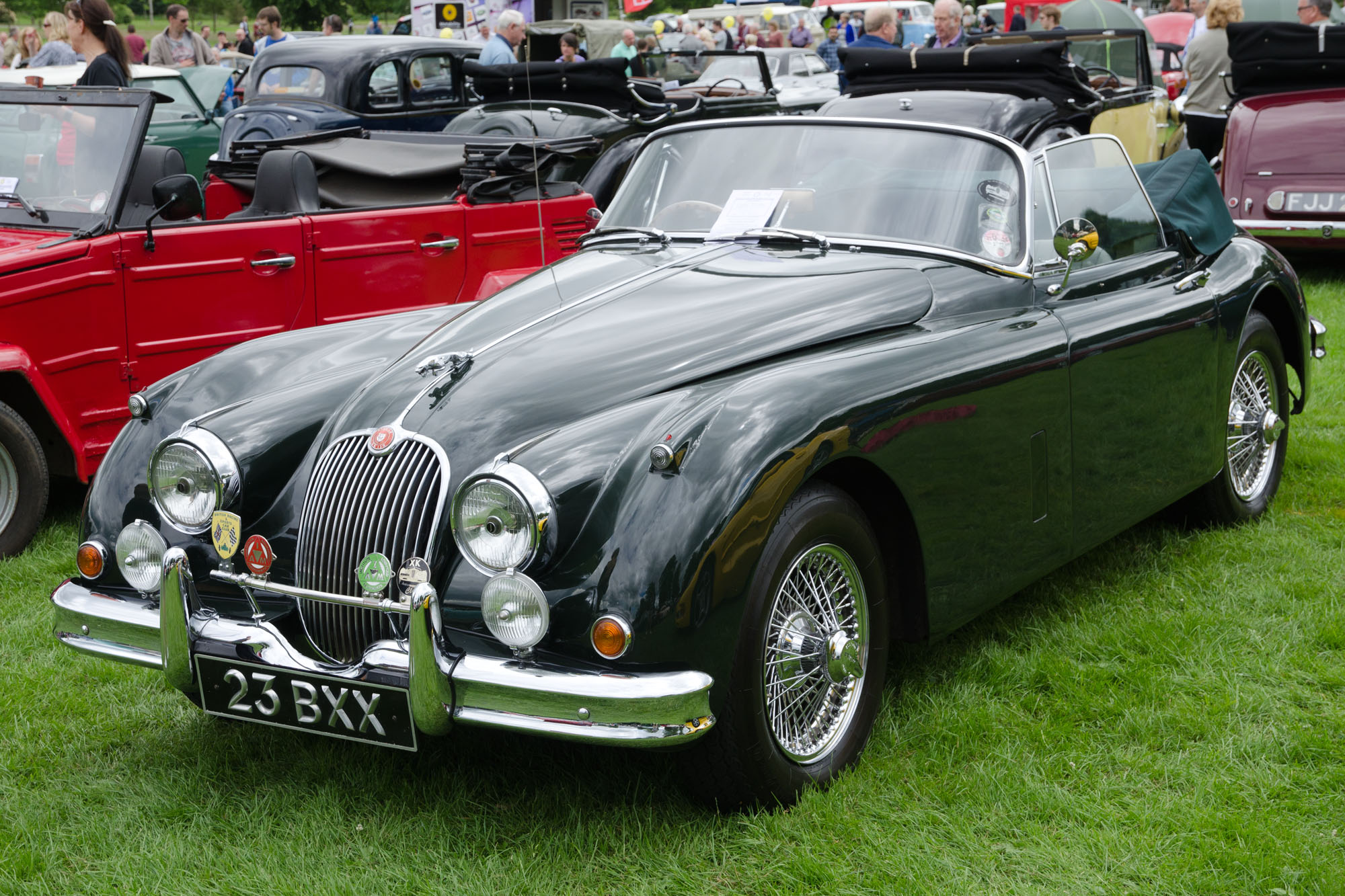
1961 drophead coupé

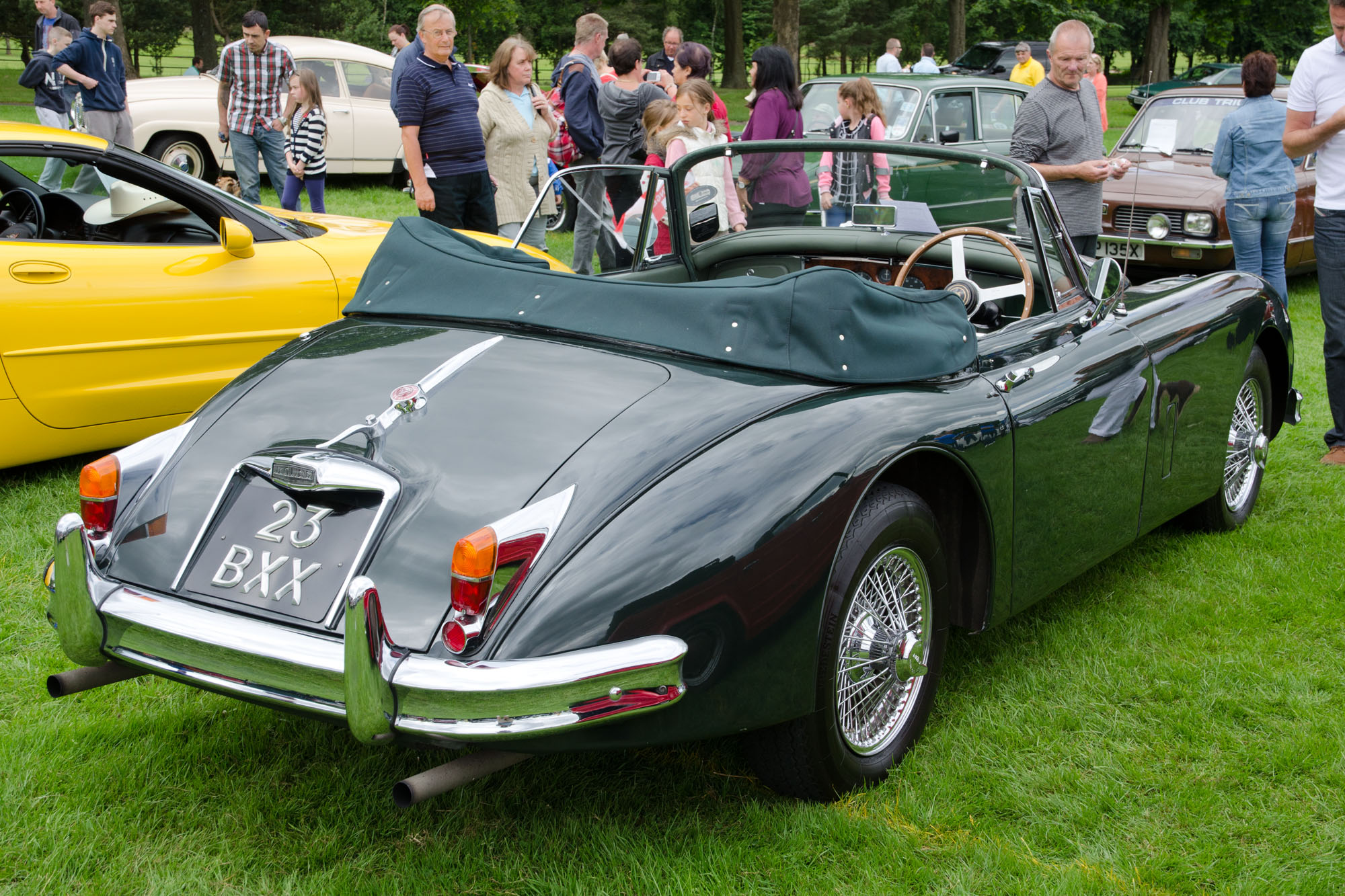
1961 drophead coupé

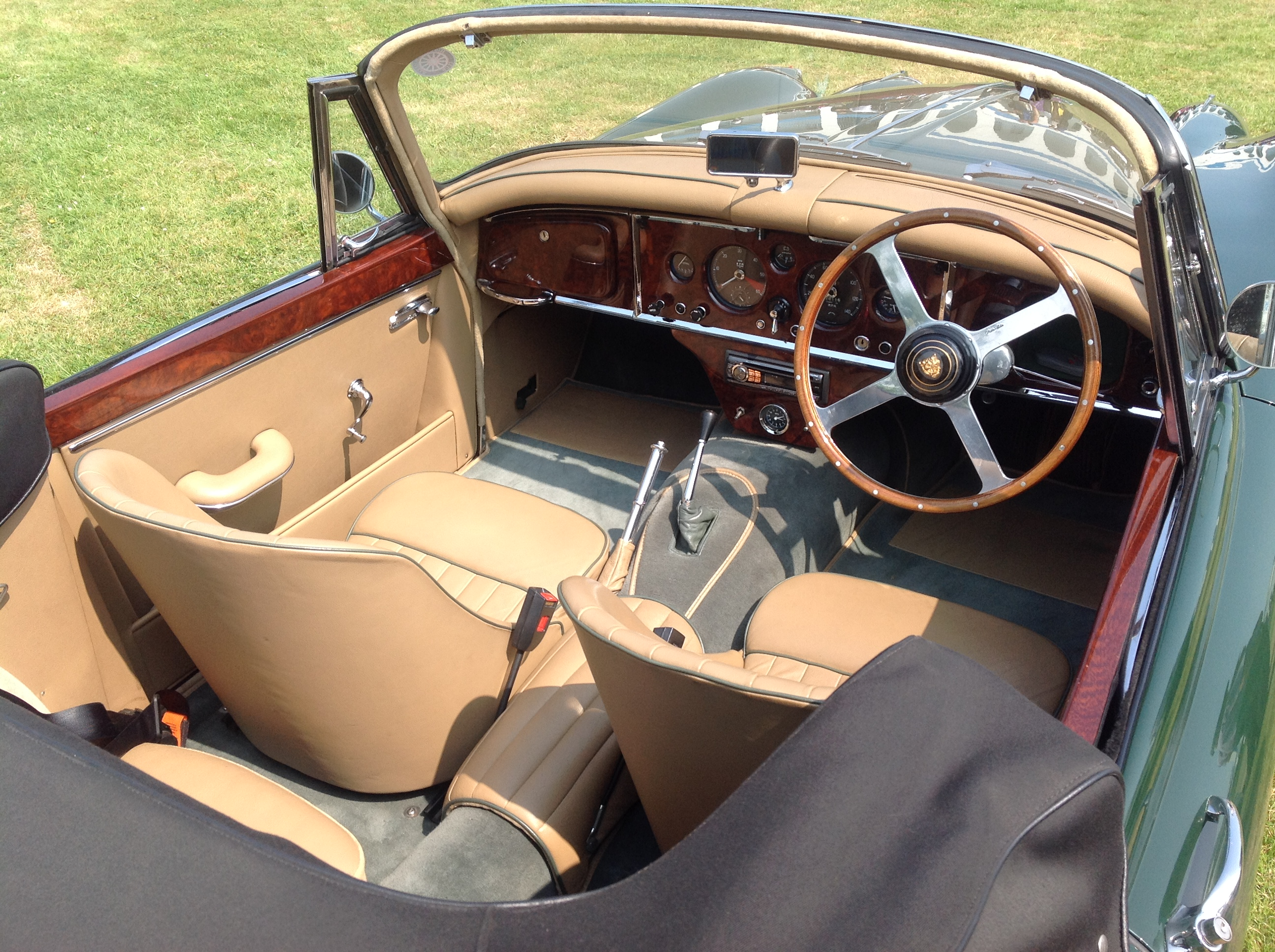
1959 drophead coupé

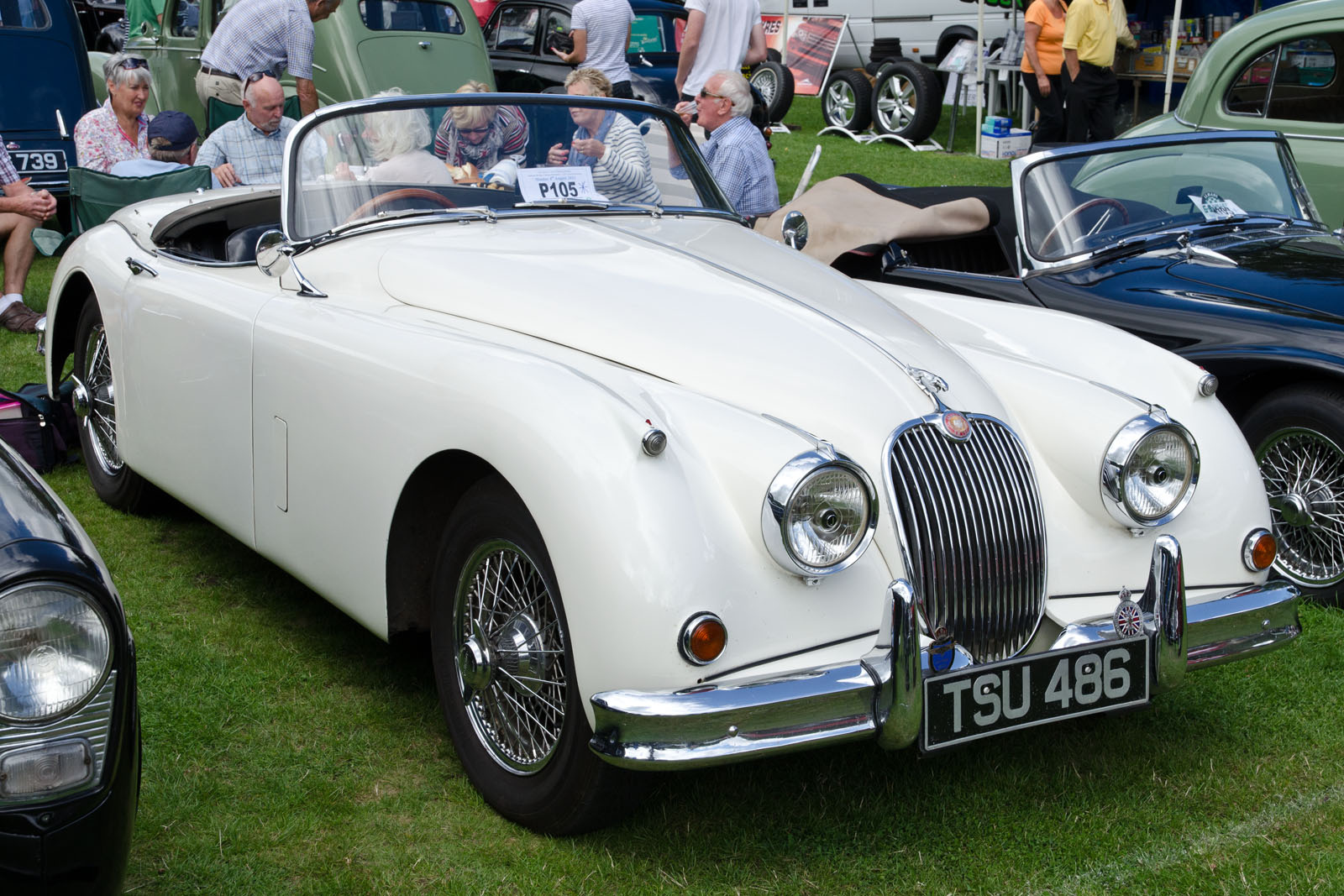
1958 roadster (open two-seater)

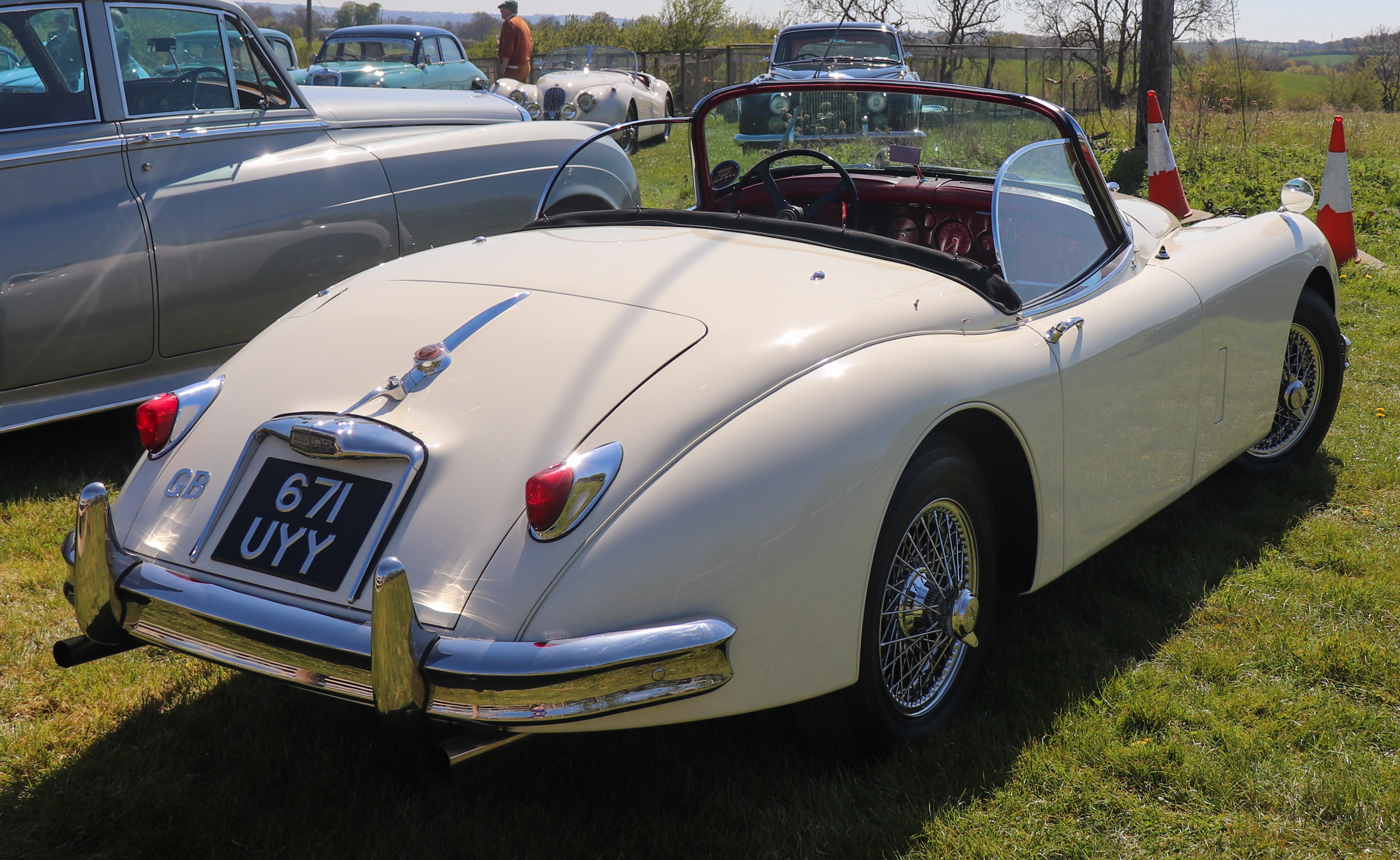
1959 S roadster (open two-seater)

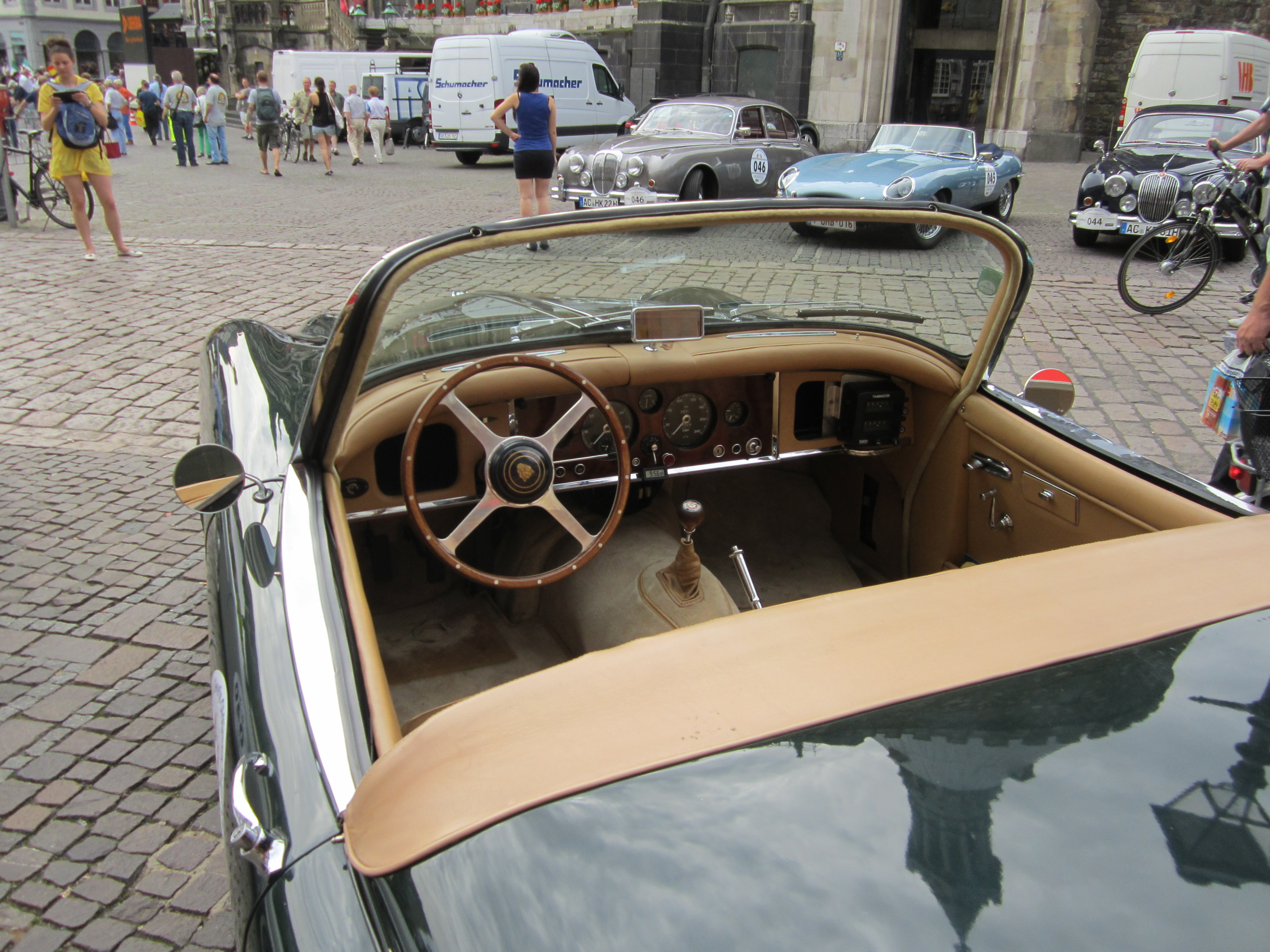
1958 roadster (open two-seater)

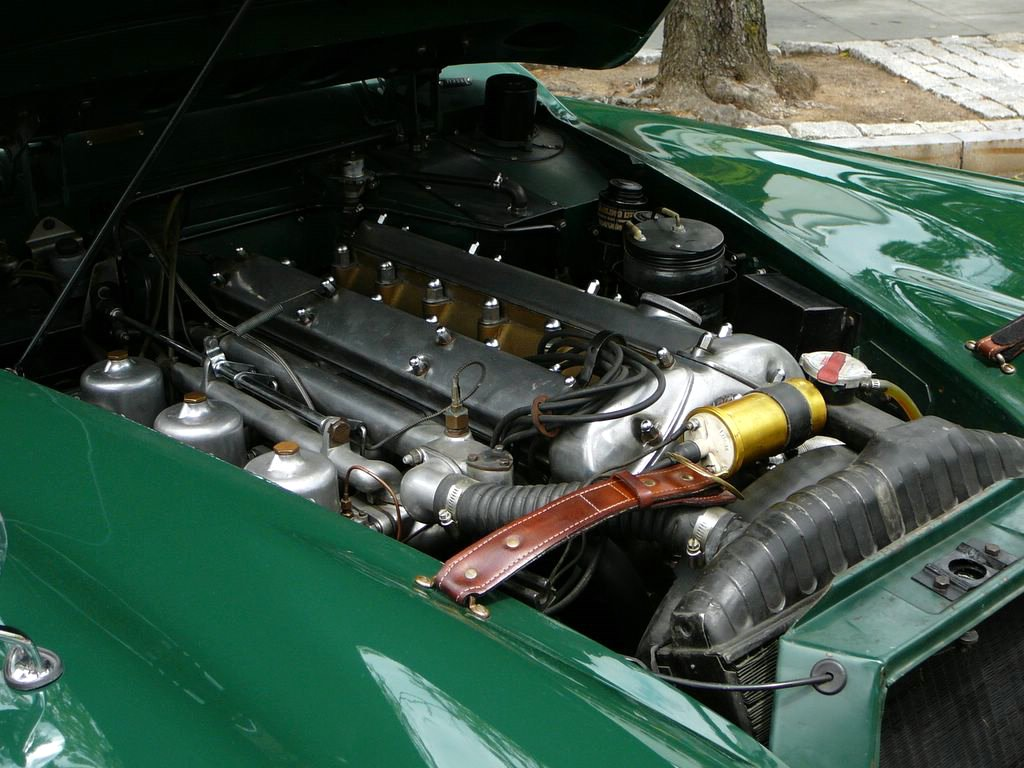
XK150 S triple SU H8 carburettors
