= Kieft Cars =

Kieft
- Industry: Car manufacturing
- Founder: Cyril Kieft
- Headquarters: Wolverhampton, UK

Kieft Cars, founded by Cyril Kieft, was a British car company that built Formula Three racing cars and some road going sports cars in a factory in Derry St, Wolverhampton.

== History ==
Cyril Kieft was born in Swansea and spent his early working life in the steel industry. After the Second World war he started up his own company Cyril Kieft and Co Ltd in Bridgend, Glamorgan, making forgings and pressings including components for the motor industry. He had an interest in motor racing and, when the Formula Three car manufacturer Marwyn failed, he bought their designs and used them as a base for his own 500cc car. Several of these were sold and some competition success resulted. Publicity was gained by successful attempts on a series of records at Montlhéry in France. One of the drivers was Stirling Moss, who explained the shortcomings of the cars. As a result of this, a new design was acquired which copied the novel "free roll" rubber suspended swing axle independent rear suspension layout of the highly successful "Freikaiserwagen" hillclimb race car, Moss and his manager Ken Gregory became directors, and the company moved to new premises at Reliance Works in Derry Street, Wolverhampton.

A new design by Gordon Bedson, who had joined the company from the aircraft industry, was produced in time for the 1951 Whit Monday Meeting at Goodwood where it won the Formula Three event driven by Moss. Don Parker was employed as works driver and won the British Formula Three Championship in 1952 and 1953.

Between 1953 and 1954, Kieft designed a Formula One car. It was designed to accommodate a Coventry-Climax Godiva engine, but the engine was not released in time due to fears it would be uncompetitive, and the project was shelved. It would later be acquired by Bill Morris, a former ERA driver, and restored for historic racing. The car finally debuted in September 2002 at a VSCC Silverstone meeting, with Cyril Kieft in attendance. It also raced in the 2006 Historic Grand Prix of Monaco.

In 1954, Kieft started to make a two-seater sports car which could also be used as a road car. Using a Coventry Climax FWA engine, all independent suspension with transverse leaf springs at the rear and a lightweight glass fibre body, the car was essentially a racing car and at £1560 it is doubtful if any were bought just as road cars.

The company was losing money and at the end of 1954 Kieft sold the company to racing driver Berwyn Baxter.

Kieft Cars left Wolverhampton in 1956 and moved to nearby Birmingham, where they concentrated on preparing and tuning other makes of cars. There were plans for a return to making Kieft cars but these failed to materialise. The company was sold again in 1960 and changed its name to Burmans.

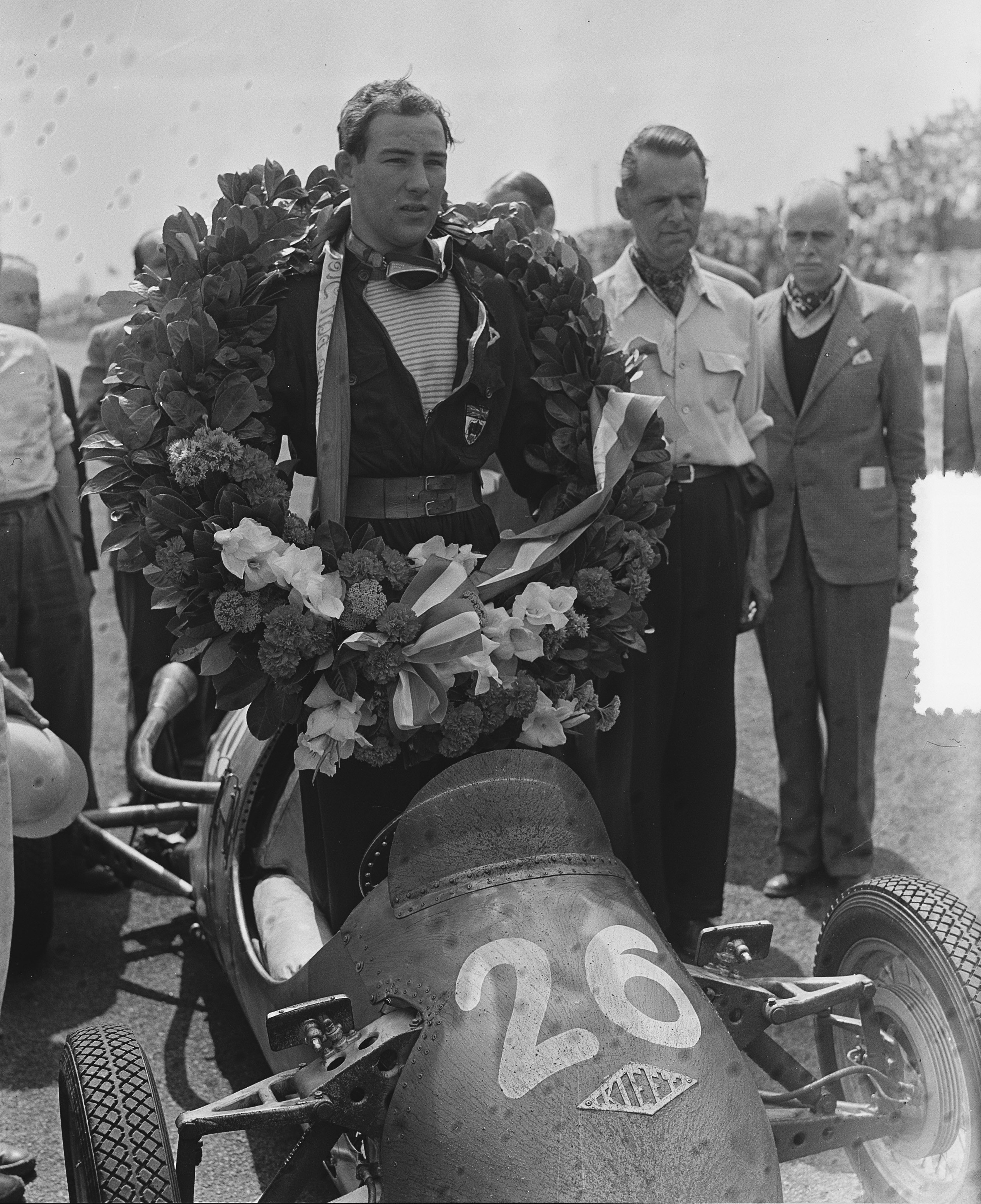
Stirling Moss won the Formula 3 support race at the 1951 Dutch Grand Prix driving a Kieft.

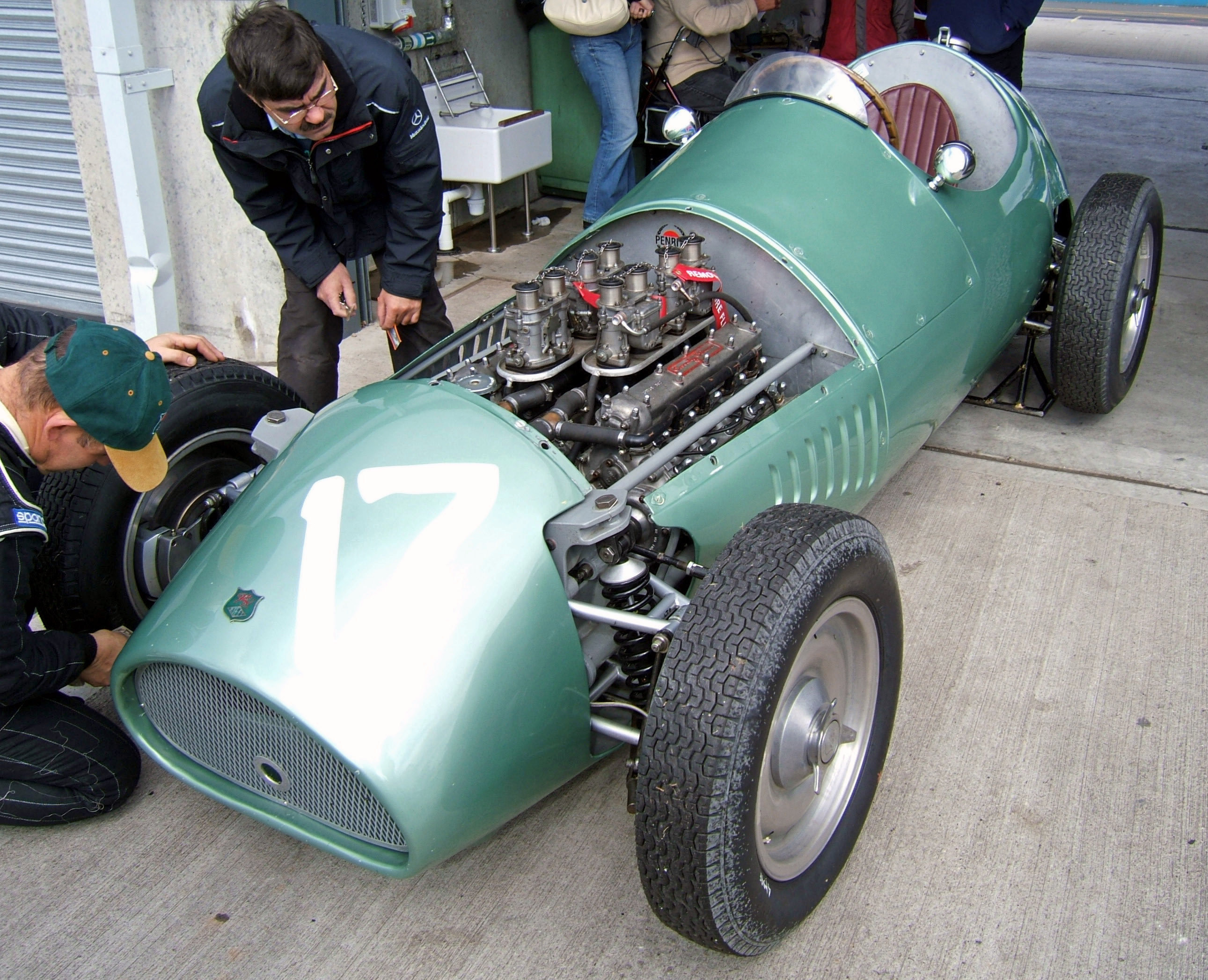
Although best known for their F3 designs, Kieft also designed a Formula One car. It had to wait until 2002 to make its race debut.

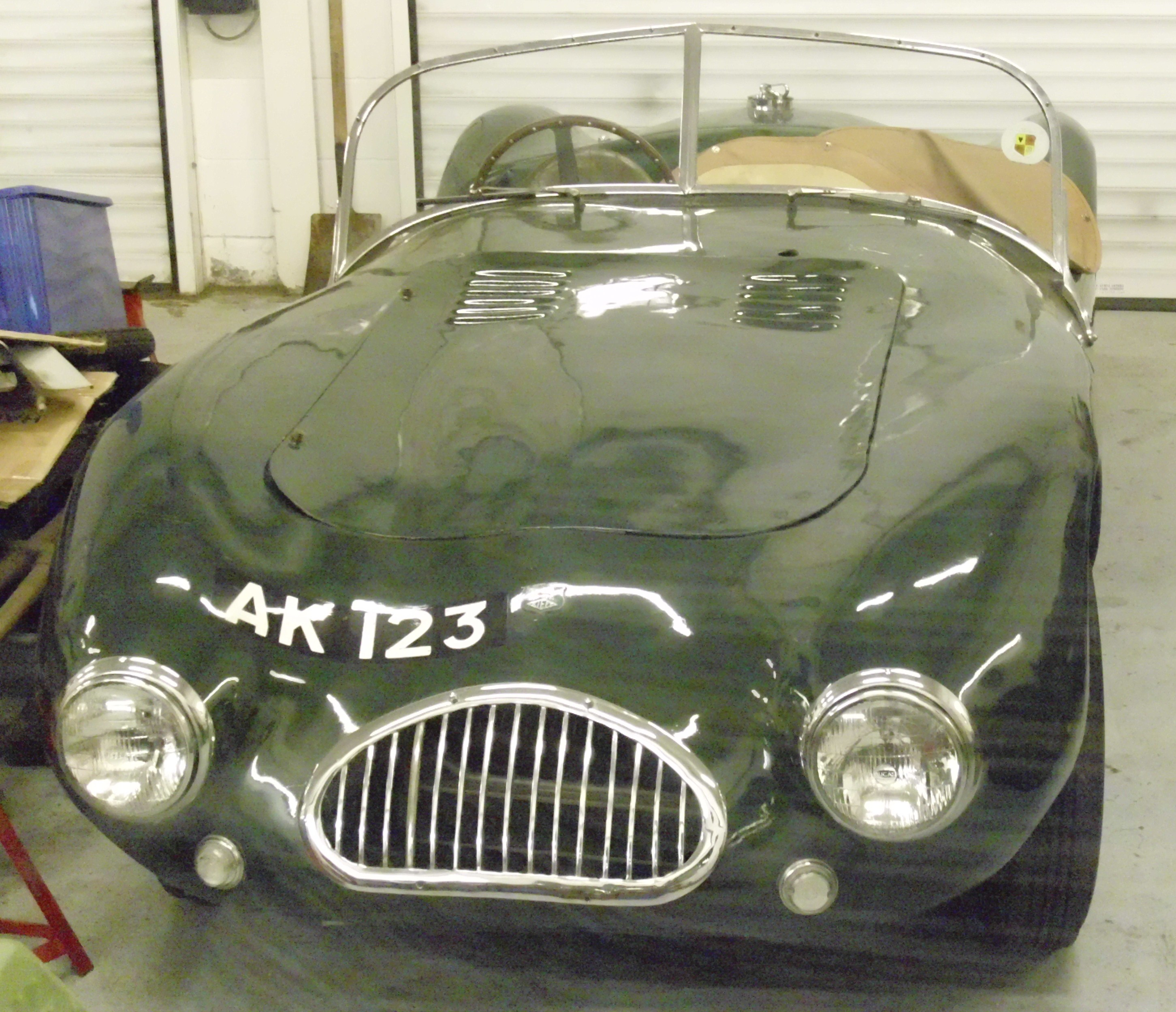
1954 Kieft 1100 sports car

== See also ==
- List of car manufacturers of the United Kingdom

== Sources ==
- G.N. Georgano "Adams-Farwell", The Complete Encyclopedia of Motorcars 1885-1968. New York: E.P. Dutton and Co., 1974, p. 27.
- G.N. Georgano, editor: The Complete Encyclopedia of Motorcars, 1885 to the Present. Dutton Press, New York, 2nd ed. 1973, ISBN 0-525-08351-0
