= Robbin Kieft =

Dutch footballer (born 1987)

Personal information
- Date of birth: 22 July 1987 (age 39)
- Place of birth: Turin, Italy
- Height: 1.87 m (6 ft 2 in)
- Position: Forward

Youth career
- 1993–1999: AFC
- 1999–2005: Ajax
- 2005–2006: Groningen

Senior career*
Years	Team	Apps	(Gls)
2006–2007	Groningen	3	(0)
2007–2009	AFC		
2009–2011	Buitenveldert		
2012–2013	Hilversum		

International career
2002	Netherlands U16	3	(1)
- * Club domestic league appearances and goals

Robbin Kieft (born 22 July 1987) is a Dutch former professional footballer who played for Eredivisie club FC Groningen from 2005 to 2007. He is the son of former Netherlands international footballer Wim Kieft.

Kieft gained three caps for the Netherlands under-16 side, in which he scored once.

== Career ==
Born in Turin, Italy, while his father Wim Kieft played for Torino, Robbin Kieft played youth football for AFC and Ajax. He broke through to senior football as part of the Groningen team in the 2005–06 and 2006–07 seasons. As was the case with his father, he made his debut in a match against Sparta Rotterdam.

In July 2007 he trialled with ADO Den Haag but was unable to secure a contract. He then moved to amateur club AFC, where he had played youth football, but left "after a few months due to a disagreement".

In 2011, Kieft joined FC Hilversum from SC Buitenveldert.
