= Cyril Kieft =

Welsh industrialist and racing driver (1911–2004)

Cyril Kieft (1911–2004) was a Welsh industrialist and racing driver. He founded Kieft Cars, which produced Formula 3 cars and sports cars in the 1950s.
