= Brian van Loo =

Dutch footballer (born 1975)

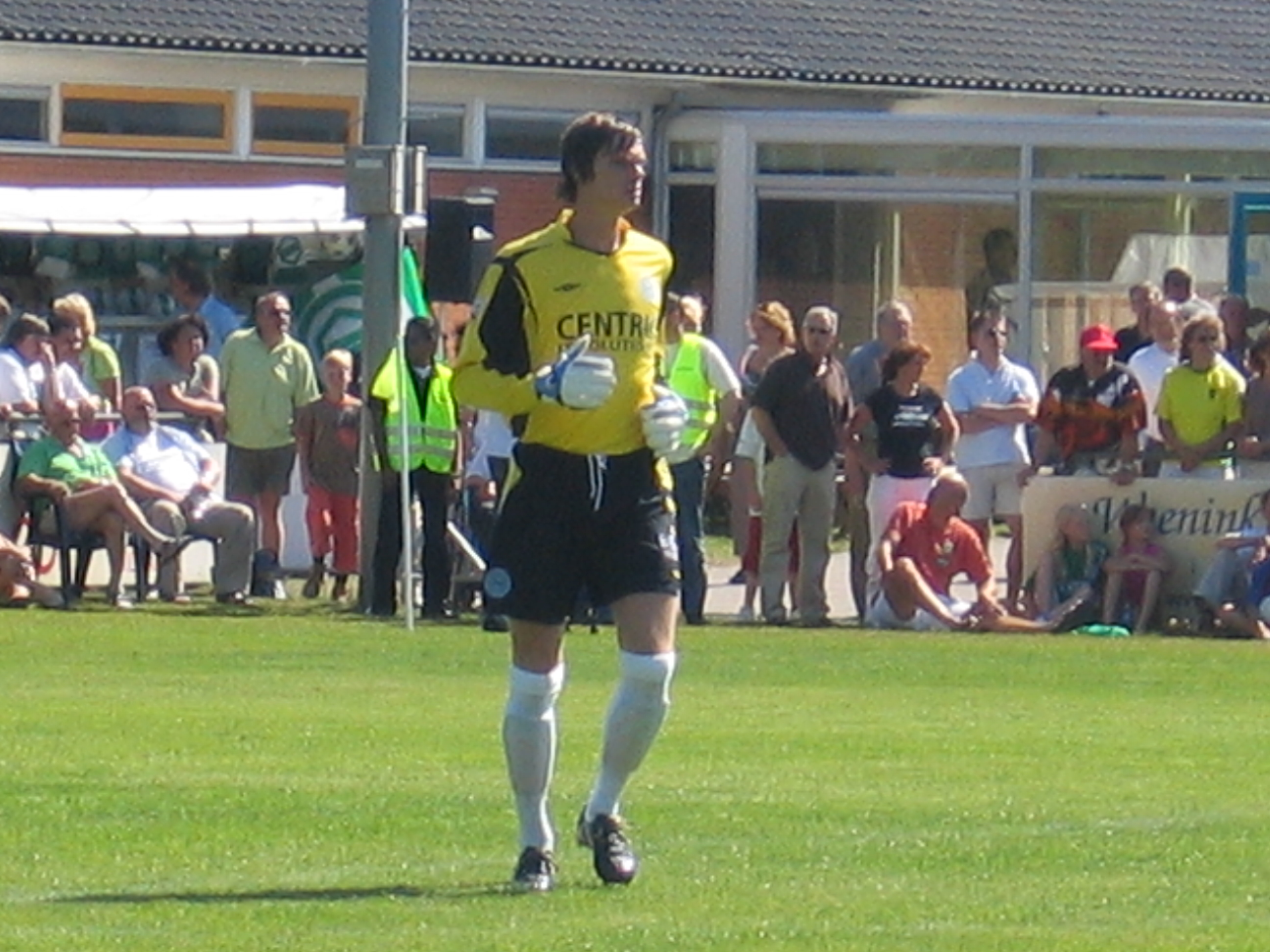

Personal information
- Full name: Brian Marcel van Loo
- Date of birth: 2 April 1975 (age 51)
- Place of birth: Almelo, Netherlands
- Height: 1.98 m (6 ft 6 in)
- Position: Goalkeeper

Youth career
- PH
- Stevo

Senior career*
Years	Team	Apps	(Gls)
1999–2006	Heracles Almelo	198	(0)
2006–2012	FC Groningen	63	(0)
2012–2013	Heracles Almelo	0	(0)
Total		261	(0)
- * Club domestic league appearances and goals

Brian van Loo (Dutch pronunciation: [ˈbrɑi.ə(ɱ) vɑn ˈloː]; born 2 April 1975) is a Dutch former professional footballer. He has played for FC Groningen and Heracles Almelo. In September 2013, Van Loo retired from professional football. He has since worked as the goalkeepers coach at his former club Heracles.

== Honours ==
Heracles Almelo

- Eerste Divisie: 2004–05
