= 1953 BRDC International Trophy =

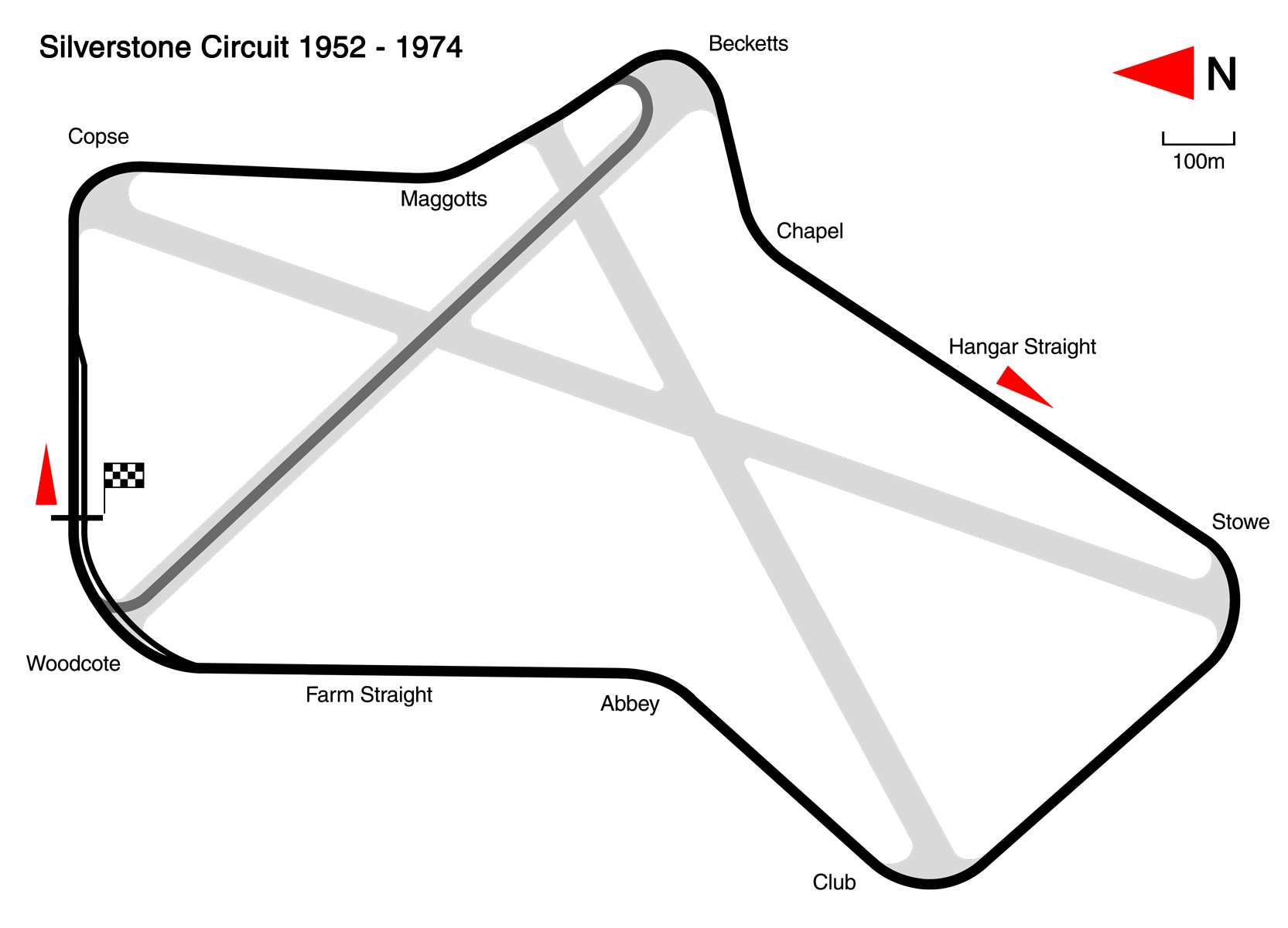

Race details
- Date: 9 May 1953
- Official name: V Daily Express BRDC International Trophy
- Location: Silverstone Circuit, Northamptonshire
- Course: Permanent racing facility
- Course length: 4.70 km (2.93 miles)
- Distance: final 35 laps, 164.31 km (102.44 miles)

Pole position
Driver	(Switzerland) Emmanuel de Graffenried	Maserati
- Time: 1:51

Fastest lap
Drivers	(United Kingdom) Mike Hawthorn	Ferrari
	(Switzerland) Emmanuel de Graffenried	Maserati
- Time: 1:51

Podium
First	(United Kingdom) Mike Hawthorn	Ferrari
Second	(United Kingdom) Roy Salvadori	Connaught-Lea Francis
Third	(United Kingdom) Tony Rolt	Connaught-Lea Francis

The 5th BRDC International Trophy – formally the Daily Express International Trophy – meeting was held on 9 May 1953 at the Silverstone Circuit, Northamptonshire. The race was run to Formula Two regulations, and was held over two heats of 15 laps each, followed by a final race of 35 laps. Mike Hawthorn, driving a Ferrari 500 won the final and shared fastest lap with Emmanuel de Graffenried. de Graffenried was the fastest qualifier.

== Results ==
=== Final – 35 Laps ===
Pos	No.	Driver	Entrant	Car	Time/Ret.	Grid
1	12	(United Kingdom) Mike Hawthorn	Scuderia Ferrari	Ferrari 500	1:06:36, 148.54 kph	1
2	18	(United Kingdom) Roy Salvadori	Connaught Engineering	Connaught Type A-Lea Francis	+12s	5
3	5	(United Kingdom) Tony Rolt	R.R.C. Walker Racing Team	Connaught Type A-Lea Francis	+42s	8
4	47	(Thailand) B. Bira	Autocourse	Maserati A6GCM	+1:51	6
5	36	(United Kingdom) Ken Wharton	Ken Wharton	Cooper T23-Bristol	+1:51	2
6	35	(United Kingdom) Bob Gerard	F.R. Gerard Racing	Cooper T23-Bristol	+1:54	16
7	17	(United Kingdom) Kenneth McAlpine	Connaught Engineering	Connaught Type A-Lea Francis	+1 lap	13
8	10	(United Kingdom) Peter Whitehead	Atlantic Stable	Cooper T24-Alta	+1 lap	7
9	7	(United Kingdom) Stirling Moss	Cooper Car Company	Cooper T24-Alta	+1 lap	4
10	15	(France) Louis Rosier	Ecurie Rosier	Ferrari 500	+1 lap	14
11	24	(United Kingdom) Peter Collins	HW Motors Ltd	HWM-Alta	+1 lap	12
12	21	(United Kingdom) Duncan Hamilton	HW Motors Ltd	HWM-Alta	+1 lap	15
13	28	(United Kingdom) Bobbie Baird	Scuderia Irlandia	Ferrari 500	+1 lap	10
14	14	(United Kingdom) Ninian Sanderson	Ecurie Ecosse	Cooper T20-Bristol	+2 laps	20
15	19	(Belgium) Johnny Claes	Ecurie Belge	Connaught Type A-Lea Francis	+2 laps	22
16	45	(Belgium) Jacques Swaters	Ecurie Francorchamps	Cooper T23-Bristol	+2 laps	21
17	11	(United Kingdom) James Scott Douglas	Ecurie Ecosse	Connaught Type A-Lea Francis	+3 laps	17
18	41	(United Kingdom) Eric Brandon	Eric Brandon	Cooper T20-Bristol	+3 laps	18
19	42	(United Kingdom) John Webb	John Webb	Turner-Lea Francis	+3 laps	28
20	25	(United Kingdom) Frank Curtis	HW Motors Ltd	HWM-Alta	+4 laps	26
21	44	(United Kingdom) Gerry Dunham	Gerry Dunham	DHS-Rover	+4 laps	24
Ret	32	(United Kingdom) Archie Bryde	Archie Bryde	Cooper T20-Bristol	18 laps, fire	23
Ret	29	(Switzerland) Emmanuel de Graffenried	Scuderia Enrico Platé	Maserati A6GCM	16 laps, withdrew after being penalised for false start	3
Ret	16	(Monaco) Louis Chiron	Louis Chiron	O.S.C.A. Tipo 20	16 laps, fuel tank	9
Ret	2	(France) Maurice Trintignant	Equipe Gordini	Gordini Type 16	8 laps, lost wheel	11
Ret	22	(United Kingdom) Lance Macklin	HW Motors Ltd	HWM-Alta	8 laps	19
Ret	37	(United Kingdom) Horace Richards	H.A. Richards	H.A.R.-Riley	4 laps, clutch	25
DNS	9	(United States) Tom Cole	Atlantic Stable	Ferrari 500	mechanical	27
DNS	4	(United States) Harry Schell	Equipe Gordini	Gordini Type 16		
DNQ	43	(United Kingdom) Geoff Richardson	Geoff Richardson	RRA-Riley	Ret, heat 1	
DNQ	1	(Argentina) Roberto Mieres	Equipe Gordini	Gordini Type 16	Ret, heat 1	
DNQ	3	(Germany) Hans Stuck	Hans Stuck	AFM-Küchen	Ret, heat 1	
DNQ	31	(Republic of Ireland) Joe Kelly	Joe Kelly	Alta-Bristol	Ret, heat 1	
DNQ	33	(United Kingdom) Bill Aston	Bill Aston	Aston Butterworth	Ret, heat 1	
DNQ	30	(United Kingdom) Leslie Marr	Leslie Marr	Connaught Type-Lea Francis	Ret, heat 2	
DNQ	20	(United Kingdom) John Coombs	Connaught Engineering	Connaught Type-Lea Francis	Ret, heat 2	
DNS	8	(United Kingdom) Alan Brown	Equipe Anglaise	Cooper T23-Alfa Romeo		
DNS	26	(United Kingdom) Bill Skelly	Bill Skelly	Frazer Nash FN56		
DNS	34	(United Kingdom) Tony Crook	Tony Crook	Cooper T23-Bristol		
DNS	38	(United Kingdom) John Lyons	John Lyons	Connaught Type-Lea Francis		
DNS	39	(France) André Loens	André Loens	Kieft-Butterworth		
DNS	40	(United Kingdom) Paul Emery	Emeryson Cars	Emeryson 56-Alta		
DNA	6	(Belgium) Georges de Kando	Georges de Kando	Veritas RS		
DNA	23	(United Kingdom) Jack Fairman	HW Motors Ltd	HWM-Alta		
DNA	27	(Australia) Tony Gaze	Tony Gaze	Alta F2		
DNA	46	(Switzerland) Ottorino Volonterio	Ottorino Volonterio	Maserati A6GCM		
DNA	1	(France) Jean Behra	Equipe Gordini	Gordini Type 16	car driven by Mieres	
DNA	14	(United Kingdom) Jimmy Stewart	Ecurie Ecosse	Cooper T20-Bristol	car driven by Sanderson	
DNA	39	(United Kingdom) John Nicholson	John Nicholson	Kieft	car driven by Loens	

- Fastest lap: Emmanuel de Graffenried/Mike Hawthorn – 1:51

=== Heats – 15 Laps ===
Heat 1

Pos	Driver	Time/Ret.	Grid
1	(Switzerland) Emmanuel de Graffenried	28:59, 146.28kph	1
2	(United Kingdom) Stirling Moss	+5s	11
3	(Thailand) B. Bira	+22s	6
4	(United Kingdom) Tony Rolt	+28s	3
5	(United Kingdom) Kenneth McAlpine	+55s	4
6	(France) Louis Rosier	+56s	10
7	(United Kingdom) Duncan Hamilton	+1:14	9
8	(United Kingdom) Bob Gerard	+1:43 (inc. 60s penalty for false start)	2
=	(United Kingdom) James Scott Douglas	+1:43	12
10	(United Kingdom) Eric Brandon	+2:00	8
11	(Belgium) Jacques Swaters	+1 lap	16
12	(Belgium) Johnny Claes	+1 lap	7
13	(United Kingdom) Horace Richards	+1 lap	17
14	(United Kingdom) Frank Curtis	+1 lap	19
15	(United States) Tom Cole	+1 lap	20
Ret	(United Kingdom) Geoff Richardson	12 laps	13
Ret	(Argentina) Roberto Mieres	10 laps, transmission	5
Ret	(Germany) Hans Stuck	6 laps, engine	14
Ret	(Republic of Ireland) Joe Kelly	3 laps, crash damage	15
Ret	(United Kingdom) Bill Aston	2 laps, oil leak	18

- Fastest lap: Emmanuel de Graffenried/Stirling Moss – 1:54
Heat 2

Pos	Driver	Time/Ret.	Grid
1	(United Kingdom) Mike Hawthorn	28:23, 149.37kph	2
2	(United Kingdom) Ken Wharton	+1s	1
3	(United Kingdom) Roy Salvadori	+50s	6
4	(United Kingdom) Peter Whitehead	+1:00	10
5	(Monaco) Louis Chiron	+1:09	3
6	(United Kingdom) Bobbie Baird	+1:18	7
7	(United States) Harry Schell	+1:19	5
8	(United Kingdom) Peter Collins	+1:19.2	9
9	(France) Maurice Trintignant	14 laps, transmission	4
10	(United Kingdom) Lance Macklin	+1 lap	8
11	(United Kingdom) Ninian Sanderson	+1 lap	13
12	(United Kingdom) Archie Bryde	+1 lap	12
13	(United Kingdom) Gerry Dunham	+1 lap	14
14	(United Kingdom) John Webb	+2 laps	16
Ret	(United Kingdom) Leslie Marr		15
Ret	(United Kingdom) John Coombs	6 laps, radiator	11

- Fastest lap: Mike Hawthorn – 1:51

Previous race: 1953 Bordeaux Grand Prix	Formula One non-championship races 1953 season	Next race: 1953 Eläintarhanajot
Previous race: 1952 BRDC International Trophy	BRDC International Trophy	Next race: 1954 BRDC International Trophy
