= 1953 Lavant Cup =

Race details
- Date: 6 April 1953
- Official name: V Lavant Cup
- Location: Chichester, West Sussex, UK
- Course: Goodwood Circuit
- Course length: 3.863 km (2.400 mi)
- Distance: 7 laps, 27.039 km (16.801 mi)

Pole position
Driver	(United Kingdom) Roy Salvadori	Connaught-Lea Francis
- Time: 1:35.4

Fastest lap
Driver	(United Kingdom) Roy Salvadori	Connaught-Lea Francis
- Time: 1:36.6

Podium
First	(Switzerland) Emmanuel de Graffenried	Maserati
Second	(United Kingdom) Roy Salvadori	Connaught-Lea Francis
Third	(United Kingdom) Tony Rolt	Connaught-Lea Francis

The 5th Lavant Cup was a non-championship Formula Two motor race held at Goodwood Circuit on 6 April 1953. The race was won by Emmanuel de Graffenried in a Maserati A6GCM. Roy Salvadori, starting from pole, finished second in a Connaught Type A-Lea Francis, setting fastest lap in the process. Tony Rolt was third in another Type A.

== Results ==
Pos	No	Driver	Entrant	Car	Time/Retired	Grid
1	5	(Switzerland) Emmanuel de Graffenried	Baron de Graffenried	Maserati A6GCM	11:30.6, 141.04kph	2
2	26	(United Kingdom) Roy Salvadori	Connaught Engineering	Connaught Type A-Lea Francis	+12.6s	1
3	8	(United Kingdom) Tony Rolt	R.R.C. Walker Racing Team	Connaught Type A-Lea Francis	+19.4s	4
4	25	(United Kingdom) Kenneth McAlpine	Connaught Engineering	Connaught Type A-Lea Francis	+22.8s	6
5	15	(United Kingdom) Peter Whitehead	Atlantic Stable	Cooper T24-Alta	+29.4s	7
6	30	(United Kingdom) Ken Wharton	Ken Wharton	Cooper T23-Bristol	+33.6s	9
7	6	(United Kingdom) Stirling Moss	Cooper Car Company	Cooper T24-Alta	+35.0s	18
8	16	(United Kingdom) Bob Gerard	F.R. Gerard	Cooper T23-Bristol	+35.8s	5
9	21	(United Kingdom) Bobbie Baird	Saipa Modena	Ferrari 500	+41.4s	3
10	27	(United Kingdom) John Coombs	Connaught Engineering	Connaught Type A-Lea Francis	+43.2s	8
11	34	(United Kingdom) James Scott Douglas	Ecurie Ecosse	Connaught Type A-Lea Francis	+47.4s	11
12	35	(United Kingdom) Jimmy Stewart	Ecurie Ecosse	Cooper T20-Bristol	+53.2s	14
13	41	(United Kingdom) John Sparrowe	Fraser-Hartwell Syndicate	Cooper T20-Bristol	+1:03.6	16
14	43	(United Kingdom) Leslie Marr	Leslie Marr	Connaught Type A-Lea Francis	+1:04.0	15
15	9	(United Kingdom) Paul Emery	Equipe Anglaise	Cooper T23-Alfa Romeo	+1 lap	19
Ret	28	(United Kingdom) Eric Brandon	Cooper Car Company	Cooper T20-Bristol		20
Ret	39	(United Kingdom) Frank Curtis	J. Heath	HWM-Alta		17
Ret	37	(United Kingdom) Archie Bryde	A.H.M. Bryde	Cooper T20-Bristol		13
Ret	40	(United Kingdom) Mike Christie	M.A. Christie	Kieft-JAP		12
DNS	32	(United Kingdom) Duncan Hamilton	HW Motors Ltd	HWM-Alta		10
DNS	33	(United Kingdom) Bill Aston	Bill Aston	Aston Butterworth		
DNA	9	(United Kingdom) Alan Brown	Equipe Anglaise	Cooper T23-Alfa Romeo	car driven by Emery	
DNA	41	(United Kingdom) Alan Fraser	Fraser-Hartwell Syndicate	Cooper T20-Bristol	car driven by Sparrowe	
DNA	42	(United Kingdom) John Webb	John Webb	Turner-Lea Francis		
DNA	44	(United Kingdom) Horace Richards	Horace Richards	H.A.R.-Riley		

Previous race: 1953 Pau Grand Prix	Formula One non-championship races 1953 season	Next race: 1953 Aston Martin Owners Club Formula 2 Race
Previous race: 1952 Lavant Cup	Lavant Cup	Next race: 1954 Lavant Cup
