= 1954 RedeX Trophy =

- Non-championship race in the 1954 Formula One season

Race details
- Date: 14 August 1954
- Official name: II RedeX Trophy
- Location: Snetterton Circuit, Norfolk
- Course: Permanent racing facility
- Course length: 4.35 km (2.71 miles)
- Distance: 40 laps, 174.0 km (108.4 miles)

Pole position
Driver	Not known	
- Grid positions set by ballot

Fastest lap
Driver	(United Kingdom) Reg Parnell	Ferrari
- Time: 1:48.4

Podium
First	(United Kingdom) Reg Parnell	Ferrari
Second	(United Kingdom) Bob Gerard	Cooper-Bristol
Third	(United Kingdom) Don Beauman	Connaught-Lea Francis

The 2nd RedeX Trophy was a motor race, run to Formula One rules, held on 14 August 1954 at Snetterton Circuit, Norfolk. The race was run over 40 laps, and was won by British driver Reg Parnell in a Ferrari 625, setting fastest lap in the process. Bob Gerard in a Cooper T23-Bristol was second and Don Beauman in a Connaught Type A-Lea Francis was third.

== Results ==
Pos.	No.	Driver	Entrant	Car	Time/Ret.
1	1	(United Kingdom) Reg Parnell	Scuderia Ambrosiana	Ferrari 500	1:13:16.8, 88.42mph
2	8	(United Kingdom) Bob Gerard	F.R. Gerard	Cooper T23-Bristol	+49.0s
3	3	(United Kingdom) Don Beauman	Sir Jeremy Boles	Connaught Type A-Lea Francis	+1 lap
4	19	(United Kingdom) Horace Gould	Gould's Garage (Bristol)	Cooper T23-Bristol	+1 lap
5	30	(United Kingdom) Rodney Nuckey	Ecurie Richmond	Cooper T23-Bristol	+2 laps
6	17	(United Kingdom) Charles Boulton	Ecurie Ane	Connaught-Lea Francis	+4 laps
7	15	(United Kingdom) Dick Gibson	R. Gibson	Cooper T23-Bristol	+5 laps
8	16	(United Kingdom) Horace Richards	H.A. Richards	H.A.R.-Riley	+14 laps
Ret	5	(United Kingdom) Bill Whitehouse	W.J. Whitehouse	Connaught Type A-Lea Francis	23 laps, transmission
Ret	9	(United Kingdom) Peter Whitehead	P.N. Whitehead	Cooper T24-Alta	19 laps, suspension
Ret	14	(United Kingdom) Ted Whiteaway	E.N. Whiteaway	HWM-Alta	16 laps, steering
Ret	11	(United Kingdom) Jack Fairman	J.H. Webb	Turner-Lea Francis	13 laps, mechanical
Ret	20	(United Kingdom) Charles Mauritzen	The Border Reivers	Cooper T20-Bristol	4 laps, mechanical
Ret	6	(United Kingdom) Leslie Marr	L. Marr	Connaught Type A-Lea Francis	1 lap, crash
Ret	12	(United Kingdom) Anthony Brooke	A. Brooke	HWM-Alta	1 lap, crash
DNA	2	(United Kingdom) Don Beauman	Sir Jeremy Boles	Ferrari 625	car not purchased
DNA	4	(United Kingdom) John Riseley-Prichard	Sir Jeremy Boles	Connaught Type A-Lea Francis	car driven by Beauman
DNA	7	(United Kingdom) Michael Young	Roebuck Engineering	Connaught Type A-Lea Francis	
DNA	10	(United Kingdom) Roy Salvadori	Gilby Engineering	Maserati 250F	car not repaired
DNA	18	(United Kingdom) Paul Emery	Emeryson Cars	Emeryson Mk.1-Alta	
DNA	28	(United Kingdom) Tony Crook	T.A.D. Crook	Cooper T23-Bristol	
DNA	34	(United Kingdom) Peter Collins	G.A. Vandervell	Vanwall	

Previous race: 1954 International Gold Cup	Formula One non-championship races 1954 season	Next race: 1954 Pescara Grand Prix
Previous race: 1953 RedeX Trophy	RedeX Trophy	Next race: 1955 RedeX Trophy
