= 1954 International Gold Cup =

- Non-championship race in the 1954 Formula One season

Race details
- Date: 7 August 1954
- Official name: I International Gold Cup
- Location: Oulton Park Circuit, Cheshire
- Course: Permanent racing facility
- Course length: 4.44 km (2.76 miles)
- Distance: 36 laps, 159.44 km (99.40 miles)

Pole position
Driver	(United Kingdom) Bob Gerard	Cooper
- Time: 1:59.4

Fastest lap
Driver	(United Kingdom) Stirling Moss	Maserati
- Time: 1:56.8

Podium
First	(United Kingdom) Stirling Moss	Maserati
Second	(United Kingdom) Reg Parnell	Ferrari
Third	(United Kingdom) Bob Gerard	Cooper

The 1st International Gold Cup was a non-championship Formula One motor race held on 7 August 1954 at the Oulton Park Circuit, Cheshire. The race was run over 36 laps of the circuit, and was won by British driver Stirling Moss in a Maserati 250F. Reg Parnell was second in a Ferrari and Bob Gerard, who qualified on pole, third in his Cooper-Bristol.

This was Moss's first Formula One win; he had won the Aintree 200 earlier in the season but that was a Formula Libre event.

== Results ==
Pos	No.	Driver	Entrant	Car	Time/Retired	Grid
1	7	(United Kingdom) Stirling Moss	Officine Alfieri Maserati	Maserati 250F	1h11m27.0, 83.48 mph	21
2	5	(United Kingdom) Reg Parnell	Scuderia Ambrosiana	Ferrari 625	1h12m47.4, +1m20.4	3
3	12	(United Kingdom) Bob Gerard	F.R. Gerard	Cooper T23-Bristol	1h12m51.0, +1m24.0	1
4	6	(United Kingdom) Don Beauman	Sir Jeremy Boles	Connaught Type A-Lea Francis	1h13m19.2, +1m52.2	7
5	30	(United Kingdom) Rodney Nuckey	Ecurie Richmond	Cooper T23-Bristol	34 laps	13
6	27	(United Kingdom) Bill Whitehouse	W.J. Whitehouse	Connaught Type A-Lea Francis	34 laps	8
7	17	(Italy) Leslie Marr	L. Marr	Connaught Type A-Lea Francis		5
8	20	(United Kingdom) Charles Boulton	Ecurie Ane	Connaught Type A-Lea Francis		12
9	15	(United Kingdom) Leslie Thorne	Ecurie Ecosse	Connaught Type A-Lea Francis		10
NC	18	(United Kingdom) Michael Young	Roebuck Engineering	Connaught Type A-Lea Francis		15
NC	14	(United Kingdom) Ninian Sanderson	Ecurie Ecosse	Cooper T20-Bristol		9
NC	23	(United Kingdom) Horace Richards	H.A. Richards	H.A.R.-Riley		20
DNF	21	(United Kingdom) Alan Brown	A. Brown	Cooper T23-Bristol	18 laps - fuel pump	4
DNF	3	(United Kingdom) Roy Salvadori	Gilby Engineering	Maserati 250F	14 laps - crash	6
DNF	22	(United Kingdom) Anthony Brooke	A. Brooke	HW-Alta	4 laps - brakes	17
DNF	26	(France) Jean Behra	Equipe Gordini	Gordini Type 16	2 laps - magneto	2
DNF	25	(United Kingdom) Jack Fairman	J.H. Webb	Turner-Lea Francis	0 laps - half-shaft	14
DNF	24	(United Kingdom) Paul Emery	Emeryson Cars	Emeryson-Alta	0 laps - cylinder head	19
DNS	10	(United Kingdom) Albert Wake	Ormskirk Motor Auctions	Alta-Bristol		18
DNS	28	(United Kingdom) Tony Crook	T.A.D. Crook	Cooper T24-Bristol		16
DNA	2	(Italy) Giovanni de Riu	Giovanni de Riu	Maserati A6GCM		-
DNA	4	(United States) Harry Schell	H. Schell	Maserati A6GCM		-
DNA	8	(United Kingdom) Mike Hawthorn	Scuderia Ferrari	Ferrari 625	no car available	-
DNA	9	(France) Robert Manzon	Ecurie Rosier	Ferrari 625		-
DNA	11	(United Kingdom) Jimmy Somervail	Border Reivers	Cooper T20-Bristol		-
DNA	16	(United Kingdom) Tony Rolt	R.R.C. Walker Racing Team	Connaught Type A-Lea Francis		-
DNA	16	(United Kingdom) Peter Walker	R.R.C. Walker Racing Team	Connaught Type A-Lea Francis		-
DNA	19	(United Kingdom) Sir Jeremy Boles	Sir Jeremy Boles	Connaught Type A-Lea Francis		-
DNA	25	(United Kingdom) John Webb	J.H. Webb	Turner-Lea Francis	car driven by Jack Fairman	-
DNA	26	(Belgium) André Pilette	Equipe Gordini	Gordini Type 16		-
DNA	29	(United Kingdom) Eric Brandon	Ecurie Richmond	Cooper T23-Bristol		-

Previous race: 1954 II Cornwall MRC Formula 1 Race	Formula One non-championship races 1954 season	Next race: 1954 RedeX Trophy
Previous race: —	International Gold Cup	Next race: 1955 International Gold Cup
