= 1953 Madgwick Cup =

Race details
- Date: 26 September 1953
- Official name: VI Madgwick Cup
- Location: Chichester, West Sussex, UK
- Course: Goodwood Circuit
- Course length: 3.863 km (2.400 mi)
- Distance: 7 laps, 27.039 km (16.801 mi)

Pole position
Driver	(United Kingdom) Roy Salvadori	Connaught-Lea Francis
- Time: 1:35.4

Fastest lap
Driver	(United Kingdom) Roy Salvadori	Connaught-Lea Francis
- Time: 1:35.0

Podium
First	(United Kingdom) Roy Salvadori	Connaught-Lea Francis
Second	(United Kingdom) Stirling Moss	Cooper-Alta
Third	(United Kingdom) Tony Rolt	Connaught-Lea Francis

The 6th Madgwick Cup was a non-championship Formula Two motor race held at Goodwood Circuit on 26 September 1953. The race was won by Roy Salvadori in a Connaught Type A-Lea Francis, starting from pole and setting fastest lap. Stirling Moss in a Cooper T24-Alta finished second and Tony Rolt was third in another Type A.

== Results ==
Pos	No	Driver	Entrant	Car	Time/Retired	Grid
1	10	(United Kingdom) Roy Salvadori	Connaught Engineering	Connaught Type A-Lea Francis	11:15.0, 144.26kph	1
2	7	(United Kingdom) Stirling Moss	Cooper Car Company	Cooper T24-Alta	+3.4s	2
3	11	(United Kingdom) Tony Rolt	R.R.C. Walker Racing Team	Connaught Type A-Lea Francis	+3.8s	3
4	23	(United Kingdom) Ken Wharton	Ken Wharton	Cooper T23-Bristol	+24.8s	5
5	8	(United Kingdom) Bob Gerard	F.R. Gerard	Cooper T23-Bristol	+33.6s	4
6	27	(United Kingdom) Les Leston	Ecurie Londres	Cooper T26-JAP	+55.2s	6
7	12	(United Kingdom) Leslie Marr	Leslie Marr	Connaught Type A-Lea Francis	7 laps	8
8	14	(United Kingdom) Guy Jason-Henry	Ecurie Brittanique	Connaught Type A-Lea Francis	7 laps	10
9	9	(United Kingdom) Jimmy Somervail	Border Reivers	Cooper T20-Bristol	7 laps	9
Ret	24	(United Kingdom) Rodney Nuckey	Rodney Nuckey	Cooper T23-Bristol	6 laps	16
Ret	28	(United Kingdom) Horace Richards	Horace Richards	H.A.R.-Riley	5 laps	13
Ret	26	(United Kingdom) Jack Fairman	John Webb	Turner-Lea Francis	4 laps	11
Ret	5	(Italy) Ottorino Volonterio	Ottorino Volonterio	Maserati 4CLT/48	2 laps	14
Ret	21	(United Kingdom) Horace Gould	Gould's Garage Bristol	Cooper T23-Bristol	2 laps	7
Ret	22	(United Kingdom) Duncan Hamilton	R.J. Chase	Cooper T23-Bristol	0 laps, drive shaft	12
DNS	16	(United Kingdom) Paul Emery	Emeryson Cars	Emeryson-Aston Martin		15
DNA	6	(West Germany) Willi Sturzebecher	Willi Sturzebecher	Veritas Meteor		
DNA	15	(United Kingdom) Lance Macklin	HW Motors Ltd	HWM-Alta		
DNA	25	(United Kingdom) Austen Nurse	Austen Nurse	HWM-Alta		
DNA	86	(United Kingdom) Mike Hawthorn	L.D. Hawthorn	Cooper T20-Bristol		
DNA	9	(United Kingdom) Keith Hall	Border Reivers	Cooper T20-Bristol	car driven by Somervail	
DNA	26	(United Kingdom) John Webb	John Webb	Turner-Lea Francis	car driven by Fairman	

Previous race: 1953 Modena Grand Prix	Formula One non-championship races 1953 season	Next race: 1953 Joe Fry Memorial Trophy
Previous race: 1952 Madgwick Cup	Madgwick Cup	Next race: 1954 Madgwick Cup
