= 1953 United States Air Force Trophy =

Race details
- Date: 25 July 1953
- Official name: II United States Air Force Trophy
- Location: Snetterton Circuit, Norfolk
- Course: Permanent racing facility
- Course length: 4.362 km (2.710 mi)
- Distance: 15 laps, 65.425 km (40.653 mi)

Pole position
Driver	Not known	

Fastest lap
Driver	(United Kingdom) Bob Gerard	Cooper-Bristol
- Time: 1:51.4

Podium
First	(United Kingdom) Tony Rolt	Connaught-Lea Francis
Second	(United Kingdom) Bob Gerard	Cooper-Bristol
Third	(United Kingdom) Leslie Marr	Connaught-Lea Francis

The 2nd United States Air Force Trophy was a Formula Two motor race held on 25 July 1953 at Snetterton Circuit, Norfolk. The race was run over 15 laps, and was won by British driver Tony Rolt in a Connaught Type A-Lea Francis. Bob Gerard in a Cooper T23-Bristol was second and set fastest lap. Leslie Marr in a Connaught Type A-Lea Francis was third. Earlier in the day of the meeting Ferrari driver Bobbie Baird was killed in a sports-car race.

== Results ==
Pos.	No.	Driver	Entrant	Car	Time/Ret.
1	2	(United Kingdom) Tony Rolt	R.R.C. Walker Racing Team	Connaught Type A-Lea Francis	28:21.2, 137.93kph
2	21	(United Kingdom) Bob Gerard	F.R. Gerard	Cooper T23-Bristol	+2.2s
3	10	(United Kingdom) Leslie Marr	Leslie Marr	Connaught Type A-Lea Francis	+1:09.8
4	18	(United Kingdom) Horace Gould	Gould's Garage (Bristol)	Cooper T23-Bristol	+1:22.6
5	23	(United Kingdom) Tony Crook	Tony Crook	Cooper T20-Alta	15 laps
6	26	(United Kingdom) Jimmy Somervail	Border Reivers	Cooper T20-Bristol	15 laps
7	85	(United Kingdom) Roy Salvadori	Roy Salvadori	Frazer Nash-Bristol	15 laps
Ret	22	(United Kingdom) Brian Naylor	Brian Naylor	Alta-Bristol	8 laps
Ret	60	(United Kingdom) Kenneth McAlpine	Connaught Engineering	Connaught Type A-Lea Francis	6 laps
Ret	57	(United Kingdom) Jack Fairman	John Webb	Turner-Alta	2 laps
Ret	58	(United Kingdom) Horace Richards	H.A. Richards	H.A.R.-Riley	2 laps
Ret	25	(United Kingdom) Joyce Howard	Joyce Howard	Cromard Special-Lea Francis	0 laps
Ret	27	(United Kingdom) Peter Jopp	Emeryson Cars	Emeryson-Aston Martin	0 laps
DNS	4	(United Kingdom) Bobbie Baird	Saipa Modena	Ferrari 500	fatal accident in sports car race
DNA	8	(United Kingdom) Ken Wharton	P.H. Bell	Cooper T23-Bristol	
DNA	17	(United Kingdom) John Webb	John Webb	Turner-Lea Francis	
DNA	24	(United Kingdom) Peter Bolton	Jack Walton	Frazer Nash-Bristol	
DNA	52	(United Kingdom) Duncan Hamilton	H.W. Motors Ltd	HWM-Alta	
DNA	75	(United Kingdom) Jack Walton	Jack Walton	Cooper T25-Bristol	

Previous race: 1953 Avusrennen	Formula One non-championship races 1953 season	Next race: 1953 Circuit du Lac
Previous race: —	United States Airforce Trophy	Next race: —
