= 1953 Bristol MC & LCC Race =

1953 Bristol M.C. & L.C.C. Formula 2 Race

Race details
- Date: 3 August 1953
- Official name: I Bristol M.C. & L.C.C. Formula 2 Race 1953
- Location: Thruxton Circuit, Cheshire
- Course: Permanent racing facility
- Course length: 4.426 km (2.750 mi)
- Distance: 20 laps, 88.52 km (55.00 mi)

Fastest lap
Driver	(United Kingdom) Tony Rolt	Connaught-Lea Francis
- Time: 2:00

Podium
First	(United Kingdom) Tony Rolt	Connaught-Lea Francis
Second	(United Kingdom) Horace Gould	Cooper-Bristol
Third	(United Kingdom) Jack Walton	Cooper-Bristol

The 1st Bristol MC & LCC Formula 2 Race was a Formula Two motor race held on 3 August 1953 at Thruxton Circuit, Hampshire. The race was run over 20 laps of the circuit, and was won by British driver Tony Rolt in a Connaught Type A-Lea Francis; Rolt also set fastest lap. Horace Gould in a Cooper T23-Bristol was second and Jack Walton was third in a Cooper T25-Bristol.

== Results ==
Pos	No.	Driver	Entrant	Car	Time/Retired
1	61	(United Kingdom) Tony Rolt	R.R.C. Walker Racing Team	Connaught Type A-Lea Francis	41:15, 129.09kph
2	60	(United Kingdom) Horace Gould	Gould's Garage (Bristol)	Cooper T23-Bristol	20 laps
3	67	(United Kingdom) Jack Walton	Jack Walton	Cooper T25-Bristol	+1 lap
4	66	(United Kingdom) Peter Bolton	Jack Walton	Frazer Nash Le Mans Replica	+1 lap
	62	(United Kingdom) John Webb	John Webb	Turner-Lea Francis	
	68	(United Kingdom) Horace Richards	Horace Richards	H.A.R.-Riley	
	69	(United Kingdom) Austen Nurse	Austen Nurse	HWM-Alta	
	70	(United Kingdom) Peter Jopp	Emeryson Cars	Emeryson-Aston Martin	
	71	(United Kingdom) John Lyons	William Knight	Connaught Type A-Lea Francis	
	72	(United Kingdom) Leslie Marr	Leslie Marr	Connaught Type A-Lea Francis	
	101	(United Kingdom) Don Calvert	Don Calvert	Kieft-Bristol	
Ret.	73	(United Kingdom) Bernie Ecclestone	Bernie Ecclestone	Cooper T20-Bristol	0 laps, spin
	62	(United Kingdom) Jack Fairman	John Webb	Turner-Lea Francis	car driven by Webb
	70	(United Kingdom) Alan Brown	Emeryson Cars	Emeryson-Aston Martin	car driven by Jopp

Previous race: 1953 Circuit du Lac	Formula One non-championship races 1953 season	Next race: 1953 Mid-Cheshire MC Race
Previous race: —	Bristol M.C. & L.C.C. Formula 2 Race	Next race: —
