= 1955 Glover Trophy =

- Non-championship race in the 1955 Formula One season

Race details
- Date: 11 April 1955
- Official name: III Glover Trophy
- Location: Goodwood Circuit, West Sussex
- Course: Permanent racing facility
- Course length: 3.809 km (2.367 miles)
- Distance: 21 laps, 79.730 km (49.707 miles)

Pole position
| Driver | (United Kingdom) Stirling Moss | Maserati |

Fastest lap
| Driver | (United Kingdom) Roy Salvadori | Maserati |
- Time: 1:33.8

Podium
| First | (United Kingdom) Roy Salvadori | Maserati |
| Second | (United Kingdom) Bob Gerard | Cooper |
| Third | (United Kingdom) Don Beauman | Connaught |

The 3rd Glover Trophy was a motor race, run to Formula One rules, held on 11 April 1955 at Goodwood Circuit, West Sussex. The race was run over 21 laps, and was won by British driver Roy Salvadori in a Maserati 250F. Salvadori also set fastest lap. Stirling Moss, also in a Maserati 250F, started from pole position.

== Results ==
| Pos. | No. | Driver | Entrant | Car | Time/Retired | Grid |
|---|---|---|---|---|---|---|
| 1 | 10 | (United Kingdom) Roy Salvadori | Gilby Engineering | Maserati 250F | 33:53.0, 89.26 mph | 2 |
| 2 | 16 | (United Kingdom) Bob Gerard | F.R. Gerard | Cooper T23-Bristol | +30.4s | 6 |
| 3 | 5 | (United Kingdom) Don Beauman | Sir Jeremy Boles | Connaught A-Type-Lea Francis | +33.0s | 3 |
| 4 | 12 | (United Kingdom) Mike Keen | R.J. Chase | Cooper T23-Alta | +1:26.0 | 7 |
| 5 | 8 | (United Kingdom) Bill Holt | E.W. Holt | Connaught Type A-Lea Francis | +1:41.0 | 4 |
| 6 | 11 | (United Kingdom) Michael Young | M.F. Young | Connaught Type A-Lea Francis | +1 lap | 9 |
| Ret | 14 | (Australia) Jack Brabham | J.A. Brabham | Cooper T24-Alta | 17 laps, out of fuel | 8 |
| Ret | 7 | (United Kingdom) Stirling Moss | Stirling Moss Ltd. | Maserati 250F | 12 laps, fuel pump | 1 |
| Ret | 3 | (United Kingdom) Tony Rolt | Connaught Engineering | Connaught Type B-Alta | 8 laps, fuel pump | 5 |
| Ret | 23 | (United Kingdom) Horace Richards | H.A. Richards | H.A.R.-Riley | 0 laps, retired | 12 |
| DNS | 6 | (United Kingdom) John Riseley-Prichard | Equipe Endeavour | Connaught Type A-Lea Francis | Gearbox | 11 |
| DNS | 17 | (United Kingdom) Tony Crook | T.A.D. Crook | Cooper T24-Bristol | | 13 |
| DNS | 18 | (United Kingdom) Tom Kyffin | Equipe Devone | Cooper T23-Bristol | | 10 |
| DNS | 20 | (United Kingdom) Paul Emery | Emeryson Cars | Emeryson Mk1-Alta | | - |
| DNS | 21 | (United Kingdom) John Webb | Turner Sports Cars | Turner-Alta | | - |
| DNA | 1 | (United Kingdom) Mike Hawthorn | Vandervell Products Ltd | Vanwall | Car not ready | - |
| DNA | 4 | (United Kingdom) Alan Brown | A. Brown | Connaught Type A-Lea Francis | | - |
| DNA | 9 | (United Kingdom) John Young | J. Young | Connaught Type A-Lea Francis | | - |
| DNA | 15 | (United Kingdom) Edward Greenall | Hon. E.G. Greenall | Cooper T24-Alta | | - |

| Previous race: 1955 Pau Grand Prix | Formula One non-championship races 1955 season | Next race: 1955 Bordeaux Grand Prix |
| Previous race: 1954 Glover Trophy | Glover Trophy | Next race: 1956 Glover Trophy |
