= 1953 Aston Martin Owners Club Formula 2 Race =

Race details
- Date: 18 April 1953
- Official name: II Aston Martin Owners Club Formula 2 Race
- Location: Snetterton Circuit, Norfolk
- Course: Permanent racing facility
- Course length: 4.361 km (2.719 miles)
- Distance: 10 laps, 43.61 km (27.19 miles)

Fastest lap
Driver	(United Kingdom) Bobbie Baird	Ferrari
- Time: 1:51.0

Podium
First	(United Kingdom) Eric Thompson	Connaught
Second	(United Kingdom) Bob Gerard	Cooper-Bristol
Third	(United Kingdom) Peter Whitehead	Cooper-Alta

The 2nd Aston Martin Owners Club Formula 2 Race was a Formula Two motor race held on 18 April 1953 at Snetterton Circuit, Norfolk. The race was run over 10 laps of the circuit, and was won by British driver Eric Thompson in a Connaught Type A-Lea Francis. Bob Gerard in a Cooper T23-Bristol was second and Peter Whitehead in a Cooper T24-Alta was third. Bobbie Baird in a Ferrari 500 set fastest lap.

== Results ==
Pos	No.	Driver	Entrant	Car	Time/Retired
1	1	(United Kingdom) Eric Thompson	R.R.C. Walker Racing Team	Connaught Type A-Lea Francis	19:11.0, 135.90kph
2	2	(United Kingdom) Bob Gerard	F.R. Gerard	Cooper T23-Bristol	+1.8s
3	5	(United Kingdom) Peter Whitehead	Atlantic Stable	Cooper T24-Alta	+13.5s
4	8	(United Kingdom) Bobbie Baird	Saipa Modena	Ferrari 500	+27.2s
5	17	(United Kingdom) Rodney Nuckey	R. Nuckey	Cooper T23-Bristol	
6	15	(United Kingdom) Leslie Marr	L. Marr	Connaught Type A-Lea Francis	
7	16	(United Kingdom) Donald Bennett	D. Bennett	Cooper T19-Vincent	
8	23	(United Kingdom) Horace Richards	H.A. Richards	H.A.R.-Riley	
Ret	102	(United Kingdom) Ken Wharton	Ken Wharton	Cooper T23-Bristol	
DNS	46	(United Kingdom) Cliff Davis	C. Davis	Tojeiro-Frazer Nash	
DNA	9	(Republic of Ireland) Joe Kelly	J. Kelly	Cooper T20-Bristol	
DNA	19	(United Kingdom) Berwyn Baxter	Berwyn Baxter	Cooper T20-Bristol	
DNA	21	(United Kingdom) Tony Crook	W. Mardell	Cooper T20-Bristol	
DNA	45	(United Kingdom) Ben Wyatt	Mrs D. Wyatt	Frazer Nash FN48-Bristol	
DNA	102	(United Kingdom) Ron Flockhart	Ken Wharton	Cooper T23-Bristol	car driven by Wharton

Previous race: 1953 Lavant Cup	Formula One non-championship races 1953 season	Next race: 1953 Bordeaux Grand Prix
Previous race: 1952 Aston Martin Owners Club Formula 2 Race	Aston Martin Owners Club F2 Race	Next race: —
