= 1954 August Cup =

- Non-championship race in the 1954 Formula One season

Race details
- Date: 2 August 1954
- Official name: I August Cup
- Location: Crystal Palace Circuit, London
- Course: Permanent racing facility
- Course length: 2.164 km (1.349 miles)
- Distance: 10 (final) laps, 21.64 km (13.49 miles)

Fastest lap
Driver	(United Kingdom) Reg Parnell	Ferrari
- Time: 1:06.4

Podium
First	(United Kingdom) Reg Parnell	Ferrari
Second	(United Kingdom) Roy Salvadori	Maserati
Third	(United Kingdom) Tony Rolt	Connaught-Lea Francis

The 1st August Cup was a motor race, run to Formula One rules, held on 2 August 1954 at Crystal Palace Circuit, London. The race was run over two heats of 10 laps and a final of 10 laps, and was won by British driver Reg Parnell in a Ferrari 500.

Parnell started from pole position in Heat 1 and set fastest lap in the heat, and also in the final. Connaught driver Tony Rolt started from pole position in Heat 2 and won, while Tony Crook set fastest lap in that heat in a Cooper.

Maserati driver Roy Salvadori was second in the final and Rolt was third.

The name of the event is referred to in at least one source as the August Trophy Race.

== Entries ==
No.	Driver	Entrant	Car
3	(United Kingdom) Reg Parnell	Scuderia Ambrosiana	Ferrari 500
4	(United Kingdom) Tony Rolt	R.R.C. Walker Racing Team	Connaught Type A-Lea Francis
5	(United Kingdom) Horace Gould	Gould's Garage (Bristol)	Cooper T23-Bristol
6	(United Kingdom) Tony Crook	T.A.D. Crook	Cooper T24-Bristol
7	(United Kingdom) Keith Hall	Border Reivers	Cooper T20-Bristol
8	(United Kingdom) Jack Fairman	J.H. Webb	Turner-Lea Francis
9	(United Kingdom) Paul Emery	Emeryson Cars	Emeryson Mk.1-Alta
10	(United Kingdom) Roy Salvadori	Gilby Engineering	Maserati 250F
11	(United Kingdom) Horace Richards	H.A. Richards	H.A.R.-Riley
12	(United Kingdom) Ted Whiteaway	E.N. Whiteaway	HWM-Alta
14	(United Kingdom) Geoff Richardson	G.N. Richardson	RRA-Alta
15	(United Kingdom) Gerry Dunham	C.G.H. Dunham	DHS-Alvis
16	(United Kingdom) Oliver Simpson	Ron Searles	Rover
18	(United Kingdom) Ron Searles	Ron Searles	Cooper-JAP

== Results ==
=== Heats ===
Heat 1

Pos	Driver	Car	Time/Ret.	Grid
1	(United Kingdom) Reg Parnell	Ferrari	11:18.8, 73.81mph	1
2	(United Kingdom) Roy Salvadori	Maserati	+8.0s	2
3	(United Kingdom) Horace Gould	Cooper-Bristol	+28.0s	3
4	(United Kingdom) Keith Hall	Cooper-Bristol	10 laps	4
5	(United Kingdom) Paul Emery	Emeryson-Alta	10 laps	6
6	(United Kingdom) Gerry Dunham	DHS-Alvis		5
7	(United Kingdom) Horace Richards	H.A.R.-Riley		7

Heat 2

Pos	Driver	Car	Time/Ret.	Grid
1	(United Kingdom) Tony Rolt	Connaught-Alta	11:47.4, 70.78mph	1
2	(United Kingdom) Tony Crook	Cooper-Bristol	+17.6s	2
3	(United Kingdom) Jack Fairman	Turner-Lea Francis	+26.4s	4
4	(United Kingdom) Ted Whiteaway	HWM-Alta	10 laps	3
5	(United Kingdom) Geoff Richardson	RRA-Alta		6
6	(United Kingdom) Oliver Simpson	Rover		7
7	(United Kingdom) Ron Searles	Cooper-JAP		5

=== Final ===
Pos.	Driver	Car	Time/Retired	Grid
1	(United Kingdom) Reg Parnell	Ferrari	11:10.8, 74.59mph	1
2	(United Kingdom) Roy Salvadori	Maserati	+3.2s	2
3	(United Kingdom) Tony Rolt	Connaught-Lea Francis	+29.0s	4
4	(United Kingdom) Horace Gould	Maserati	+37.0s	3
5	(United Kingdom) Keith Hall	Cooper-Bristol	+37.6s	5
6	(United Kingdom) Ted Whiteaway	HWM-Alta	10 laps	8
7	(United Kingdom) Tony Crook	Cooper-Bristol	10 laps	7
8	(United Kingdom) Jack Fairman	Turner-Lea francis		11
9	(United Kingdom) Paul Emery	Emeryson-Alta		6
Ret	(United Kingdom) Geoff Richardson	RRA-Alta		10
DNS	(United Kingdom) Gerry Dunham	DHS-Alvis		9
DNQ	(United Kingdom) Horace Richards	HAR-Riley		-
DNQ	(United Kingdom) Oliver Simpson	Rover		-
DNQ	(United Kingdom) Ron Searles	Cooper-JAP		-

Previous race: 1954 Caen Grand Prix	Formula One non-championship races 1954 season	Next race: 1954 II Cornwall MRC Formula 1 Race
Previous race: —	August Cup	Next race: —
