= 1952 Madgwick Cup =

Race details
- Date: 27 September 1952
- Official name: V Madgwick Cup
- Location: Chichester, West Sussex, UK
- Course: Goodwood Circuit
- Course length: 3.863 km (2.388 miles)
- Distance: 7 laps, 27.041 km (16.716 miles)

Pole position
Driver	(United Kingdom) Eric Thompson	Connaught-Lea Francis

Fastest lap
Driver	(United Kingdom) Dennis Poore	Connaught-Lea Francis
- Time: 1:39.6

Podium
First	(United Kingdom) Ken Downing	Connaught-Lea Francis
Second	(United Kingdom) Dennis Poore	Connaught-Lea Francis
Third	(United Kingdom) Alan Brown	Cooper-Bristol

The 5th Madgwick Cup was a non-championship Formula Two motor race held at Goodwood Circuit on 27 September 1952. The race was won by Ken Downing in a Connaught Type A-Lea Francis. Teammate Dennis Poore was second, setting fastest lap in the process, and Alan Brown in a Cooper T20-Bristol was third.

== Results ==
Pos	No	Driver	Entrant	Car	Time/Retired	Grid
1	24	(United Kingdom) Ken Downing	Connaught Racing Syndicate	Connaught Type A-Lea Francis	11:53.0; 85.09 mph	2
2	20	(United Kingdom) Dennis Poore	Connaught Racing Syndicate	Connaught Type A-Lea Francis	+13.4s	5
3	16	(United Kingdom) Alan Brown	Ecurie Richmond	Cooper T20-Bristol	+17.4s	4
4	27	(United Kingdom) Peter Whitehead	Peter Whitehead	Alta F2	+21.8s	11
5	21	(United Kingdom) Kenneth McAlpine	Connaught Racing Syndicate	Connaught Type A-Lea Francis	+23.2s	10
6	31	(United Kingdom) Ninian Sanderson	Ecurie Ecosse	Cooper T20-Bristol	+23.3s	12
7	26	(United Kingdom) Roy Salvadori	G. Caprara	Ferrari 500	+23.4s	6
8	23	(United Kingdom) John Barber	J. Barber	Cooper T20-Bristol	+33.0s	14
9	35	(United Kingdom) Ken Wharton	Scuderia Franera	Frazer Nash-Bristol	+50.0s	20
10	33	(United Kingdom) Leslie Marr	Connaught Racing Syndicate	Connaught Type A-Lea Francis	+55.0s	18
11	3	(United Kingdom) Bill Dobson	Scuderia Ambrosiana	Ferrari 125	+1:19.6	17
12	36	(United Kingdom) Bill Skelly	Bill Skelly	Frazer Nash-Bristol	+1:50.0	19
Ret	37	(United Kingdom) Horace Richards	H.A. Richards	H.A.R.-Riley	5 laps	22
Ret	29	(United Kingdom) Oliver Simpson	R. York	Alta F2	5 laps	21
Ret	30	(Republic of Ireland) Richard Odlum	R. Odlum	Frazer Nash-Bristol	5 laps	16
Ret	34	(United Kingdom) Bill Aston	Bill Aston	Aston Butterworth	5 laps, engine	8
Ret	15	(United Kingdom) Eric Brandon	Ecurie Richmond	Cooper T20-Bristol	2 laps	9
Ret	32	(United Kingdom) Eric Thompson	Connaught Racing Syndicate	Connaught Type A-Lea Francis	1 lap, crash	1
Ret	25	(France) André Loens	Fraser-Hartwell Syndicate	Cooper T20-Bristol	0 laps, crash	13
Ret	17	(United Kingdom) Stirling Moss	ERA Ltd	ERA G-Type-Bristol	0 laps, crash	7
DNS	14	(United Kingdom) Duncan Hamilton	L. Hawthorn	Cooper T20-Bristol	engine	3
DNS	28	(United Kingdom) Gordon Watson	G. Watson	Alta F2	clutch	15
DNA	14	(United Kingdom) Mike Hawthorn	L. Hawthorn	Cooper T20-Bristol	driver injured	-
DNA	97	(United Kingdom) Harold Goldschmidt	H. Goldschmidt	Kieft-JAP		-
DNA	98	(United Kingdom) David Bennett	David Bennett	Cooper T12-JAP		-

Previous race: 1952 Skarpnäcksloppet	Formula One non-championship races 1952 season	Next race: 1952 Avusrennen
Previous race: 1951 Madgwick Cup	Madgwick Cup	Next race: 1953 Madgwick Cup
