= 1952 BRDC International Trophy =

- Non-championship race in the 1952 Formula One season
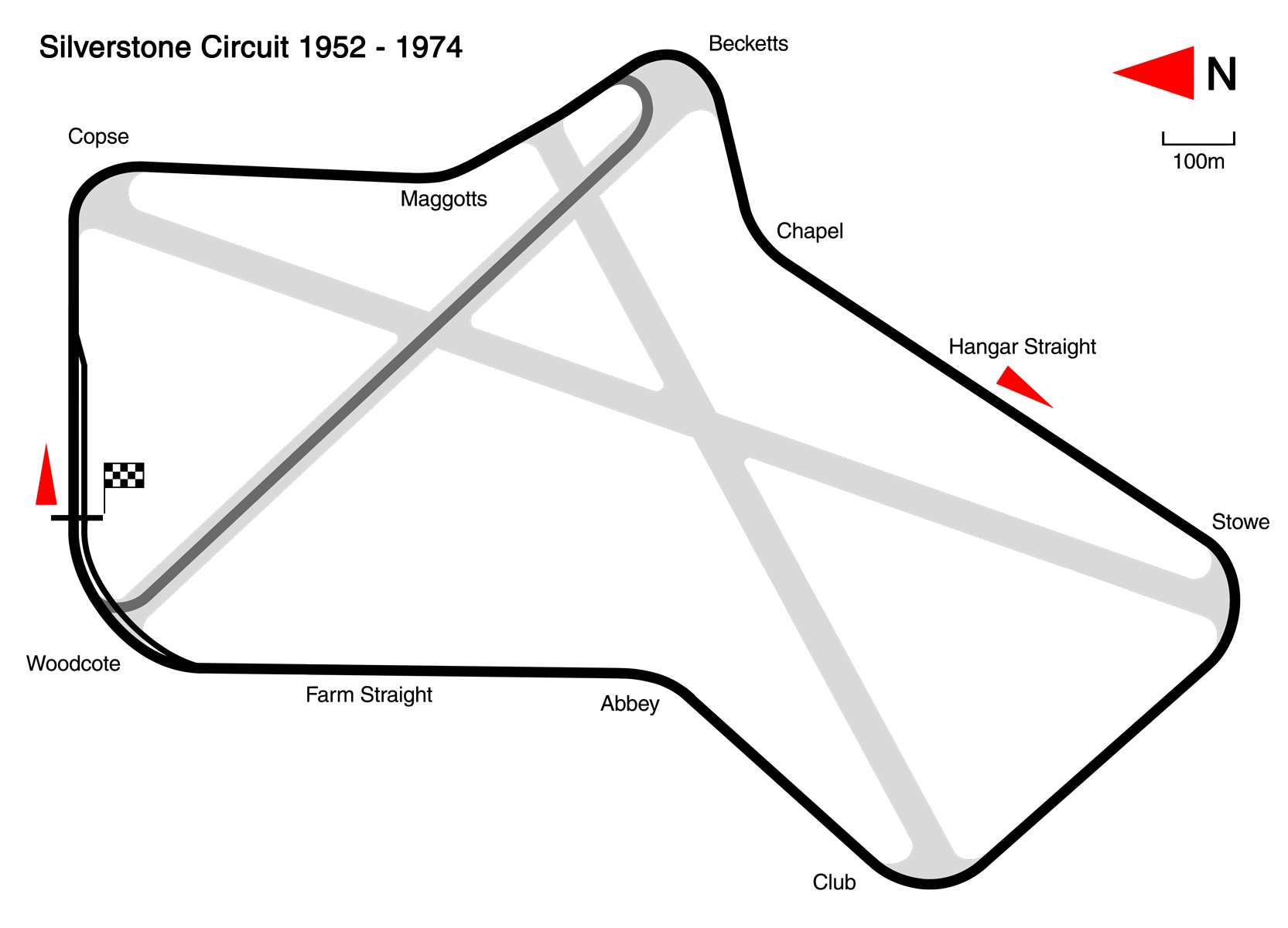

Race details
- Date: 10 May 1952
- Official name: IV Daily Express BRDC International Trophy
- Location: Silverstone Circuit, Northamptonshire
- Course: Permanent racing facility
- Course length: 4.70 km (2.93 miles)
- Distance: final 35 laps, 164.31 km (102.44 miles)

Pole position
Driver	(United Kingdom) Mike Hawthorn	Cooper-Bristol
- Time: 2:00.0

Fastest lap
Driver	(Switzerland) Rudi Fischer	Ferrari
- Time: 1:58.0

Podium
First	(United Kingdom) Lance Macklin	HWM-Alta
Second	(United Kingdom) Tony Rolt	HWM-Alta
Third	(Switzerland) Emmanuel de Graffenried	Maserati

The 4th BRDC International Trophy – formally the International Daily Express Trophy – meeting was held on 10 May 1952 at the Silverstone Circuit, Northamptonshire. The race was run to Formula Two regulations, and was held over two heats of 15 laps each, followed by a final race of 35 laps. British driver Lance Macklin, driving an HWM-Alta won the final. Mike Hawthorn in a Cooper T20-Bristol was the fastest qualifier, and Rudi Fischer in a Ferrari 500 set overall fastest lap.

== Results ==
=== Final – 35 Laps ===
Pos	! No.	Driver	Chassis	Time/Ret.
1	31	(United Kingdom) Lance Macklin	HWM-Alta	1:11:58, 85.70 mph
2	32	(United Kingdom) Tony Rolt	HWM-Alta	+10s
3	36	(Switzerland) Emmanuel de Graffenried	Maserati 4CLT/48	+25s
4	18	(Switzerland) Rudi Fischer	Ferrari 500	+33s
5	1	(United Kingdom) Peter Whitehead	Ferrari 125	+45s
6	25	(Thailand) B. Bira	Simca Gordini Type 15	+1:34
7	23	(United Kingdom) Ken Wharton	Frazer Nash FN48	+1:34
8	41	(Belgium) Johnny Claes	Simca Gordini Type 15	+2:06
9	29	(United Kingdom) Peter Collins	HWM-Alta	+1 lap
10	8	(United Kingdom) Kenneth McAlpine	Connaught Type A-Lea-Francis	+1 lap
11	39	(Germany) Toni Ulmen	Veritas-Meteor	+1 lap
12	21	(United Kingdom) Bill Dobson	Ferrari 125	+1 lap
13	9	(United Kingdom) Ken Downing	Connaught Type A-Lea-Francis	+2 laps
14	4	(United Kingdom) Gordon Watson	Alta F2	+3 laps
15	19	(Switzerland) Peter Hirt	Ferrari 212	+3 laps
16	3	(Australia) Tony Gaze	Alta F2	+4 laps
17	22	(United Kingdom) Tony Crook	Frazer Nash Le Mans Replica	+4 laps
NC	11	(United Kingdom) Mike Hawthorn	Cooper T20-Bristol	+5 laps
NC	20	(United Kingdom) Bobby Baird	Ferrari 500	+6 laps, oil leak
NC	12	(United Kingdom) Alan Brown	Cooper T20-Bristol	+12 laps
Ret	37	(United States) Harry Schell	Maserati 4CLT/48	18 laps, steering
Ret	35	(United Kingdom) Ted Lund	Lea-Francis	14 laps
Ret	30	(United Kingdom) Duncan Hamilton	HWM-Alta	9 laps, fuel feed
Ret	27	(France) Jean Behra	Simca Gordini Type 15	3 laps, transmission
Ret	33	(United Kingdom) Horace Richards	H.A.R.-Riley	2 laps
Ret	26	(France) Robert Manzon	Gordini Type 16	1 lap, transmission

- Fastest lap: Peter Whitehead/Mike Hawthorn – 1:59.0

=== Heats – 15 Laps ===
Heat 1

Pos	Driver	Team	Time/Ret.
1	(United Kingdom) Mike Hawthorn	L.D. Hawthorn	30:49.0, 85.75mph
2	(France) Jean Behra	Equipe Gordini	+2.4s
3	(United Kingdom) Peter Collins	HW Motors Ltd.	+32.0s
4	(United Kingdom) Lance Macklin	HW Motors Ltd.	+45.4s
5	(Thailand) B. Bira	Equipe Gordini	+50.8s
6	(United Kingdom) Ken Wharton	Peter Bell	+55.6s
7	(United Kingdom) Peter Whitehead	Peter Whitehead	+1:18.0
8	(United States) Harry Schell	Scuderia Enrico Platé	+1:18.2
9	(United Kingdom) Bill Dobson	Scuderia Ambrosiana	+1:41.0
10	(Australia) Tony Gaze	Tony Gaze	+1 lap
11	(Germany) Toni Ulmen	Toni Ulmen	+1 lap
12	(Switzerland) Peter Hirt	Ecurie Espadon	+1 lap
13	(United Kingdom) Horace Richards	H.A. Richards	+3 laps
14	(Belgium) Johnny Claes	Ecurie Belge	+4 laps, transmission
15	(United Kingdom) Ted Lund	Bill Skelly	+4 laps
Ret	(United Kingdom) Bill Aston	Aston Butterworth	7 laps
Ret	(United Kingdom) Ken Downing	K. Downing	6 laps, engine

- Fastest lap: Jean Behra/Mike Hawthorn – 2:00.0
Heat 2

Pos	Driver	Entrant	Time/Ret.
1	(France) Robert Manzon	Equipe Gordini	30:37.0, 86.31mph
2	(Switzerland) Rudi Fischer	Ecurie Espadon	+2.4s
3	(United Kingdom) Tony Rolt	HW Motors Ltd.	+15.0s
4	(United Kingdom) Bobby Baird	R. Baird	+25.6
5	(Switzerland) Emmanuel de Graffenried	Scuderia Enrico Platé	+31.0s
6	(United Kingdom) Alan Brown	Cooper Car Company	+54.0s
7	(United Kingdom) Tony Crook	T. Crook	+1:31.4
8	(United Kingdom) Kenneth McAlpine	Kenneth McAlpine	+1 lap
9	(United Kingdom) Bob Gerard	F.R. Gerard	+3 laps
10	(United Kingdom) Gordon Watson	G. Watson	+6 laps
Ret	(United Kingdom) Philip Fotheringham-Parker	Bill Black	8 laps, accident
Ret	(United Kingdom) Reg Parnell	Cooper Car Company	8 laps
Ret	(United Kingdom) Robin Montgomerie-Charrington	Bill Aston	7 laps, gearbox
Ret	(United Kingdom) Duncan Hamilton	HW Motors Ltd.	6 laps, differential
Ret	(Germany) Paul Pietsch	P. Pietsch	4 laps
Ret	(United Kingdom) George Abecassis	HW Motors Ltd.	4 laps, differential
Ret	(United Kingdom) Geoff Richardson	G. Richardson	1 lap

- Fastest lap: Rudi Fischer – 1:58.0

Previous race: 1952 Aston Martin Owners Club Formula 2 Race	Formula One non-championship races 1952 season	Next race: 1952 Naples Grand Prix
Previous race: 1951 BRDC International Trophy	BRDC International Trophy	Next race: 1953 BRDC International Trophy
