= 1954 BRDC International Trophy =

- Non-championship race in the 1954 Formula One season
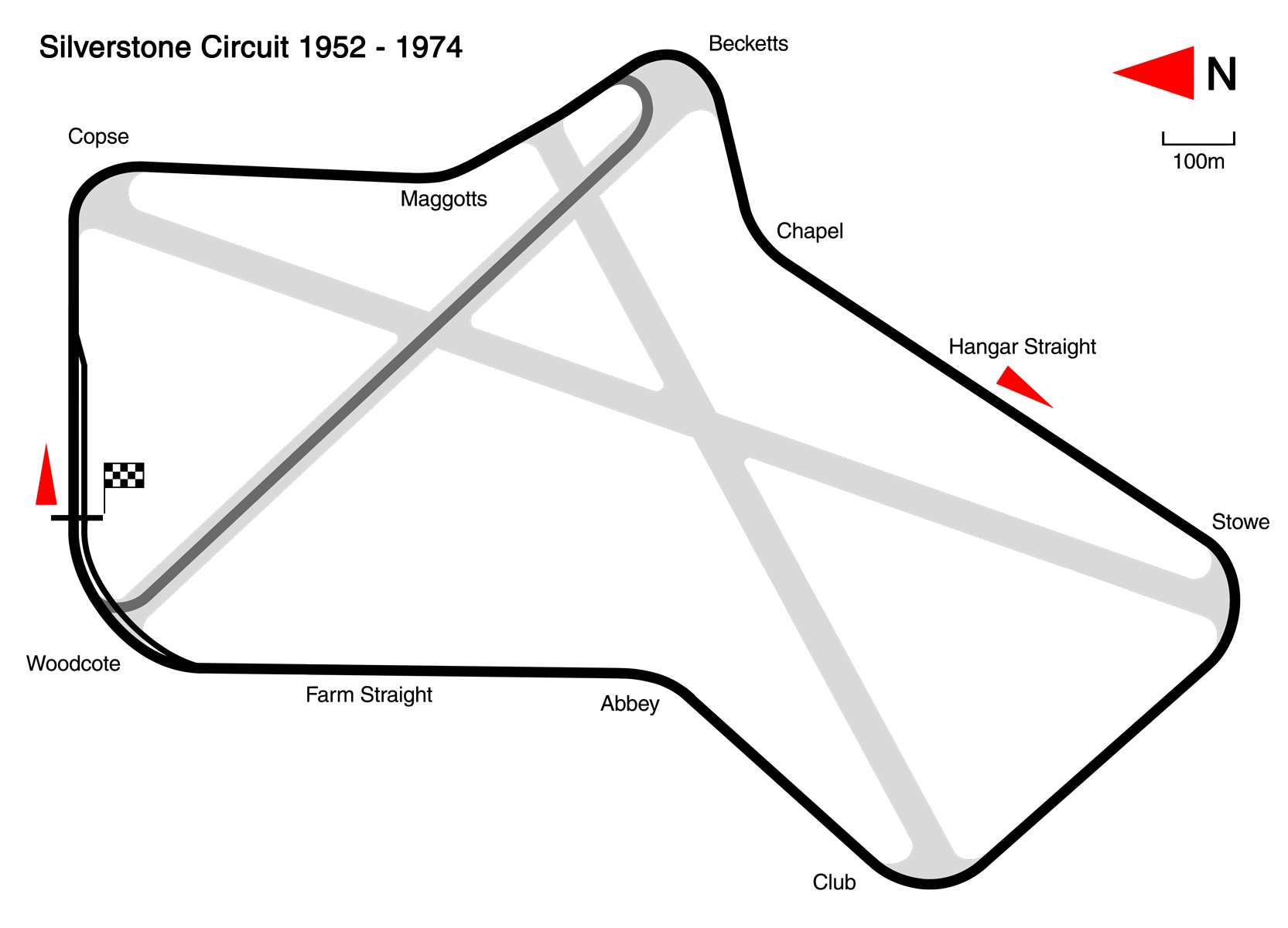

Race details
- Date: 15 May 1954
- Official name: International Daily Express Trophy
- Location: Silverstone Circuit, Northamptonshire
- Course: Permanent racing facility
- Course length: 4.70 km (2.93 miles)
- Distance: 35 laps, 164.31 km (102.44 miles)

Pole position
Driver	(Argentina) José Froilán González	Ferrari
- Time: 1:48

Fastest lap
Driver	(Argentina) José Froilán González	Ferrari
- Time: 1:50

Podium
First	(Argentina) José Froilán González	Ferrari
Second	(France) Jean Behra	Gordini
Third	(France) André Simon	Gordini

The 6th BRDC International Trophy – formally the International Daily Express Trophy – meeting was held on 15 May 1954 at the Silverstone Circuit, Northamptonshire. The race was run to Formula One regulations, and was held over two heats of 15 laps each, followed by a final race of 35 laps. Argentinian driver José Froilán González, driving a Ferrari 625, set fastest qualifying lap, won his qualifying heat (in a Ferrari 553) and the final, and also set fastest lap.

== Results ==
=== Final – 35 Laps ===
Pos	No.	Driver	Chassis	Time/Ret.
1	21	(Argentina) José Froilán González	Ferrari 625	1h06m15, 92.78 mph
2	27	(France) Jean Behra	Gordini Type 16	1h06m51, +36s
3	28	(France) André Simon	Gordini Type 16	+1 lap
4	8	(Argentina) Roberto Mieres	Maserati A6GCM	+1 lap
5	22	(France) Maurice Trintignant	Ferrari 625	+1 lap
6	25	(France) Louis Rosier	Ferrari 500	+1 lap
7	5	(United Kingdom) Tony Rolt	Connaught Type A-Lea-Francis	+1 lap
8	14	(United Kingdom) Bob Gerard	Cooper T23-Bristol	+1 lap
9	1	(United Kingdom) Don Beauman	Connaught Type A-Lea-Francis	+2 laps
10	10	(United Kingdom) Roy Salvadori	Maserati 250F	+2 laps
11	3	(United Kingdom) Leslie Marr	Connaught Type A-Lea-Francis	+2 laps
12	15	(United Kingdom) Jimmy Somervail	Cooper T20-Bristol	+2 laps
13	30	(United Kingdom) Jack Fairman	Turner-Lea-Francis	+3 laps
14	2	(United Kingdom) Michael Young	Connaught Type A-Lea-Francis	+3 laps
15	4	(United Kingdom) Kenneth McAlpine	Connaught Type A-Lea-Francis	+3 laps
NC	29	(United Kingdom) Horace Richards	H.A.R.-Riley	+8 laps
NC	31	(United Kingdom) Colin Chapman	Emeryson-Aston Martin	+8 laps
Ret	7	(United Kingdom) Stirling Moss	Maserati 250F	24 laps, de Dion tube
Ret	17	(United Kingdom) Alan Brown	Vanwall	17 laps, oil pipe
Ret	20	(United Kingdom) Ted Whiteaway	HWM-Riley	14 laps, universal joint
Ret	11	(Thailand) B. Bira	Maserati A6GCM	12 laps, clutch
Ret	6	(United Kingdom) Leslie Thorne	Connaught Type A-Lea-Francis	7 laps, suspension
Ret	26	(United Kingdom) Reg Parnell	Ferrari 500	5 laps, propeller shaft
Ret	24	(France) Robert Manzon	Ferrari 625	2 laps, transmission
DNS	23	(Italy) Umberto Maglioli	Ferrari 625	car used by Trintignant

=== Heats – 15 Laps ===
Heat 1

Pos	Driver	Team	Time/Ret.
1	(Argentina) José Froilán González	Scuderia Ferrari	31:49, 82.79 mph
2	(Thailand) B. Bira	Prince Bira	+14s
3	(United Kingdom) Stirling Moss	Officine Alfieri Maserati	+16s
4	(Italy) Umberto Maglioli	Scuderia Ferrari	+48s
5	(France) Jean Behra	Equipe Gordini	+51s
6	(United Kingdom) Alan Brown	G.A Vandervell	+1:17
7	(United Kingdom) Tony Rolt	R.R.C. Walker Racing Team	+1:18
8	(France) Louis Rosier	Equipe Rosier	+1:57
9	(United Kingdom) Don Beauman	Sir Jeremy Boles	+2:08
10	(United Kingdom) Jimmy Somervail	Border Reivers	+1 lap
11	(United Kingdom) Leslie Marr	Leslie Marr	+1 lap
12	(United Kingdom) Colin Chapman	Emeryson Cars Ltd	+1 lap
NC	(United Kingdom) Horace Richards	H.A.R.-Riley	+3 laps
DNS	(United Kingdom) Lance Macklin	Hersham and Walton Motors	mechanical

- Fastest lap: José Froilán González – 2:03
Heat 2

Pos	Driver	Entrant	Time/Ret.
1	(France) Maurice Trintignant	Scuderia Ferrari	30:09, 87.38 mph
2	(United Kingdom) Reg Parnell	Scuderia Ambrosiana	+6s
3	(France) Robert Manzon	Equipe Rosier	+47s
4	(United Kingdom) Roy Salvadori	Gilby Engineering	+1:08
5	(France) André Simon	Equipe Gordini	+1:18
6	(United Kingdom) Jack Fairman	J.H. Webb	+1 lap
7	(Argentina) Roberto Mieres	Officine Alfieri Maserati	+1 lap
8	(United Kingdom) Ted Whiteaway	E.N. Whiteaway	+1 lap
9	(United Kingdom) Leslie Thorne	Ecurie Ecosse	+1 lap
10	(United Kingdom) Bob Gerard	F.R. Gerard	+2 laps
11	(United Kingdom) Michael Young	Michael Young	+2 laps
12	(United Kingdom) Kenneth McAlpine	Kenneth McAlpine	+2 laps
Ret	(United Kingdom) Horace Gould	Gould's Garage (Bristol)	12 laps - engine
Ret	(United Kingdom) Geoff Richardson	Geoff Richardson	6 laps - valve

- Fastest lap: Maurice Trintignant – 1:57

Previous race: 1954 Bordeaux Grand Prix	Formula One non-championship races 1954 season	Next race: 1954 Bari Grand Prix
Previous race: 1953 BRDC International Trophy	BRDC International Trophy	Next race: 1955 BRDC International Trophy
