= 1953 Midlands MECC Race =

1953 Midlands M.E.C.C. Formula 2 Race
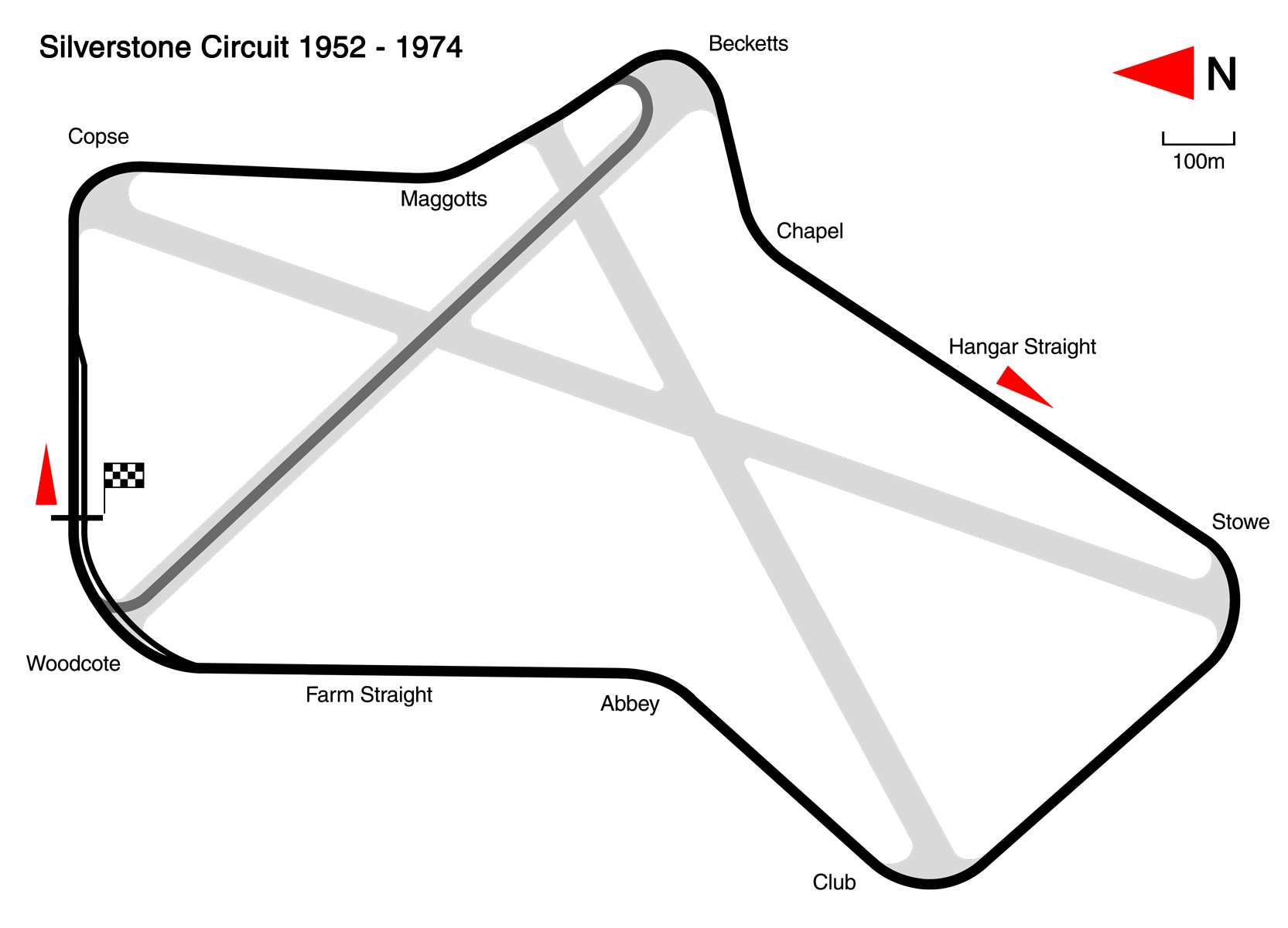

Race details
- Date: 27 June 1953
- Official name: I Midlands M.E.C.C. Formula 2 Race
- Location: Silverstone Circuit, Northamptonshire
- Course: Permanent racing facility
- Course length: 2.586 km (1.607 mi)
- Distance: 6 laps, 16.515 km (10.262 mi)

Podium
First	(United Kingdom) Tony Crook	Cooper-Alta
Second	(United Kingdom) Austen Nurse	HWM-Alta
Third	(United Kingdom) Charles Headland	Kieft-Norton

The 1st Midlands M.E.C.C. Formula 2 Race meeting was held on 27 June 1953 at the Silverstone Circuit, Northamptonshire. The race was run to Formula Two regulations, and was held over 6 laps. Tony Crook, driving a Cooper T24-Alta was first, Austen Nurse in an HWM-Alta was second and Charles Headland in a Kieft-Norton was third.

== Results ==
Pos	Driver	Entrant	Car	Time/Ret.
1	(United Kingdom) Tony Crook	Tony Crook	Cooper T24-Alta	7:34.3, 122.98 kph
2	(United Kingdom) Austen Nurse	Austen Nurse	HWM-Alta	+22.9s
3	(United Kingdom) Charles Headland	Charles Headland	Kieft-Norton	+24.0s
4	(United Kingdom) Alec McMillan	Alec McMillan	BMW 328	
5	(United Kingdom) Johnny Higham	Johnny Higham	Cooper T18-Norton	
Ret.	(United Kingdom) Horace Richards	Horace Richards	H.A.R.-Riley	clutch

Previous race: 1953 West Essex CC Formula 2 Race	Formula One non-championship races 1953 season	Next race: 1953 Rouen Grand Prix
Previous race: —	Midlands M.E.C.C. Formula 2 Race	Next race: —
