= 1955 Curtis Trophy =

- Non-championship race in the 1955 Formula One season

Race details
- Date: 29 May 1955
- Official name: III CurtisTrophy
- Location: Snetterton Circuit, Norfolk
- Course: Permanent racing facility
- Course length: 4.361 km (2.710 miles)
- Distance: 10 laps, 43.610 km (27.100 miles)

Pole position
Driver	(United Kingdom) Roy Salvadori	Maserati

Fastest lap
Driver	(United Kingdom) Roy Salvadori	Maserati
- Time: 1:48.0

Podium
First	(United Kingdom) Roy Salvadori	Maserati
Second	(United Kingdom) Archie Scott Brown	Lister-Bristol
Third	(United Kingdom) Jimmy Somervail	Cooper-Bristol

The 3rd CurtisTrophy was a motor race, run to Formula One rules, held on 29 May 1955 at Snetterton Circuit, Norfolk. The race was run over 10 laps, and was won by British driver Roy Salvadori in a Maserati 250F. Salvadori also set fastest lap and started from pole position.

== Results ==
Pos.	No.	Driver	Entrant	Car	Time/Retired	Grid
1	89	(United Kingdom) Roy Salvadori	Gilby Engineering	Maserati 250F	18:11.8, 89.03 mph	1
2	53	(United Kingdom) Archie Scott Brown	Brian Lister Light Engineering	Lister-Bristol	+1:16.6	2
3	86	(United Kingdom) Jimmy Somervail	Border Reivers	Cooper T20-Bristol	+1:58.0	3
4	87	(United Kingdom) Charles Boulton	Ecurie Ane	Connaught Type A-Lea Francis	+1 lap	5
Ret	88	(United Kingdom) Dick Gibson	R. Gibson	Connaught Type A-Lea Francis	8 laps, overheating	4
DNA	17	(United Kingdom) Tony Crook	T.A.D. Crook	Cooper T24-Bristol		-
DNA	90	(United Kingdom) Peter Collins	Owen Racing Organisation	Maserati 250F	Car not ready	-
DNA	91	(United Kingdom) Reginald Croysdill	R. Croysdill	Cooper T24-Alta		-
DNA	92	(United Kingdom) Alastair Birrell	A.W. Birrell	Cooper T20-Bristol		-
DNA	93	(United Kingdom) Michael Young	Roebuck Engineering	Connaught Type A-Lea Francis	Driver elsewhere	-
DNA	94	(United Kingdom) John Riseley-Prichard	Equipe Endeavour	Connaught Type A-Lea Francis		-
DNA	95	(United Kingdom) Horace Richards	H.A. Richards	H.A.R.-Riley		-

Previous race: 1955 Albi Grand Prix	Formula One non-championship races 1955 season	Next race: 1955 Cornwall MRC Formula 1 Race
Previous race: 1954 Curtis Trophy	Curtis Trophy	Next race: —
