= Marr baronets =

Baronetcy in the Baronetage of the United Kingdom

The Marr Baronetcy, of Sunderland in the County Palatine of Durham, is a title in the Baronetage of the United Kingdom. It was created in 1919 for Sir James Marr, a Sunderland shipbuilder. His grandson, the 2nd Baronet, did not use the title.

== Marr Baronets, of Sunderland (1919) ==
- Sir James Marr, 1st Baronet (1854–1932)
- Sir Leslie Lynn Marr, 2nd Baronet (1922–2021)
- Sir Allan James William Marr, 3rd Baronet (1965- )

The line of succession among persons listed in Debrett's Peerage 1995 (page B590) and Burke's Peerage 1999 (page 1873) and not reported deceased since:

1. Liam James Allan Marr (born 1991) (son of 3rd Baronet)

2. Roderick John Marr (born 1971) (brother of 3rd Baronet)

3. Jeremy Norman Marr (born 1940) (son of younger brother of grandfather of 3rd Baronet)

4. Kyle Jeremy Marr (born 1974) (son of #3)

5. Jordan Hugo Marr (born 1977) (son of #3)

6. Bernard Lynn Marr (born 1943) (son of youngest brother of grandfather of 3rd Baronet)
