= Cooper T25 =

The Cooper T25 is a sports car, designed, developed and built by Cooper Cars for sports car racing competition in 1953. It had humble beginnings; starting out in life as a Cooper-Bristol Mk.1, like its predecessor, the Cooper-Bristol T20/25. It found modest success, winning 18 out of the 80 races it entered between 1953 and 1955, including 2 class victories, and scored 33 podium finishes and one pole position over that same period of time. Like its predecessor, it was powered by the same 2-liter, 6-cylinder, Bristol engine.
