= Boles baronets =

Baronetcy in the Baronetage of the United Kingdom

The Boles Baronetcy, of Bishop's Lydeard in the County of Somerset, is a title in the Baronetage of the United Kingdom. It was created on 17 June 1922 for Dennis Boles, who represented Wellington and Taunton in the House of Commons as a Conservative. As of 2014 the title is held by his great-grandson, the fourth Baronet, who succeeded his father in that year.

== Boles baronets, of Bishop's Lydeard (1922) ==
- Sir Dennis Fortescue Boles, 1st Baronet (1861–1935)
- Sir Gerald Fortescue Boles, 2nd Baronet (1900–1945)
- Sir Jeremy John Fortescue Boles, 3rd Baronet (1932–2014)
- Sir Richard Fortescue Boles, 4th Baronet (born 1958)

The heir apparent is the present holder's only son James Alexander Fortescue Boles (born 1993).
