= Ken Wharton =

British racing driver (1916–1957)

- Ken Wharton in 1953.
- Born: 21 March 1916; Smethwick, Staffordshire, England
- Died: 12 January 1957 (aged 40); Ardmore, Auckland, New Zealand

Formula One World Championship career
- Nationality: (United Kingdom) British
- Active years: 1952–1955
- Team(s): privateer Frazer-Nash & Cooper, BRM, Vanwall
- Entries: 16 (15 starts)
- Championships: 0
- Wins: 0
- Podiums: 0
- Career points: 3
- Pole positions: 0
- Fastest laps: 0
- First entry: 1952 Swiss Grand Prix
- Last entry: 1955 Italian Grand Prix

Frederick Charles Kenneth Wharton (21 March 1916 – 12 January 1957) was a British racing driver from England. He competed in off-road trials, hillclimbs, and rallying, and also raced sports cars and single-seaters. He began racing in the new National 500cc Formula in his own special, and later acquired a Cooper. His World Championship Grand Prix debut was at the 1952 Swiss event, run to Formula 2 regulations, where he started from 13th position on the grid and finished fourth. He participated in a total of 15 World Championship Grands Prix, from which he scored three championship points.

On 17 August 1935, Wharton was involved in a crash at Donington Park while driving an Austin in an 850 c.c. race. The incident, which saw him overturn at Redgate corner occurred on lap one of five. Wharton escaped with abrasions to the arm.

In 1951, Wharton "travelled abroad, with Peter Bell's 2-litre E.R.A., to finish third overall in the Susa/Mont Cenis hill-climb and 4th overall in the Aosta/Grand Saint Bernard hill-climb. With a Cooper 500, he also competed in the German Freiburg hill-climb where he was runner-up in the 500 cc class to Stirling Moss." Wharton won the Freiburg event outright in the E.R.A. on 5 August, climbing the 7.4 miles of the Schauinsland Pass, in 8 minutes 5.33 seconds. On 19 August, he was fastest at the Vue des Alpes hill-climb, with a time of 3 minutes 57.8 seconds. He won the British Hill Climb Championship every year from 1951 to 1954, and remains the only driver to have won four successive BHCC titles. Other successes with ERA R4D included winning the Brighton Speed Trials in 1954, 1955 and 1956.

Success in rallies included winning the Tulip Rally in 1949, 1950 and 1952, driving Fords. Wharton also became the British Trials Champion.

On 4 July 1954, Wharton and Peter Whitehead won the Reims 12-hour race in a Jaguar D-Type.

In 1957, Wharton was fatally injured when his Ferrari Monza crashed in a sports-car race at the Ardmore Circuit in Auckland, New Zealand. More than 1,100 people attended his funeral, including his mother, father, sister, aunt, uncle and cousins.

== Complete World Championship results ==
(key)

Year	Entrant	Chassis	Engine	1	2	3	4	5	6	7	8	9	WDC	Points
1952	Scuderia Franera	Frazer-Nash FN48	Bristol Straight-6	SUI; 4	500	BEL; Ret	FRA	GBR	GER	NED; Ret			13th	3
1952	Scuderia Franera	Cooper T20	Bristol Straight-6								ITA; 9		13th	3
1953	Ken Wharton	Cooper T23	Bristol Straight-6	ARG	500	NED; Ret	BEL	FRA; Ret	GBR; 8	GER	SUI; 7	ITA; NC	NC	0
1954	Owen Racing Organisation	Maserati 250F	Maserati Straight-6	ARG	500	BEL	FRA; Ret	GBR; 8	GER; DNS	SUI; 6	ITA	ESP; 8	NC	0
1955	Vandervell Products Ltd	Vanwall	Vanwall Straight-4	ARG	MON	500	BEL	NED	GBR; 9	ITA; Ret			NC	0

Sporting positions
Preceded by Dennis Poore	British Hill Climb Champion; 1951–1954	Succeeded by Tony Marsh
