= Cooper T24 =

1953 racing automobile model

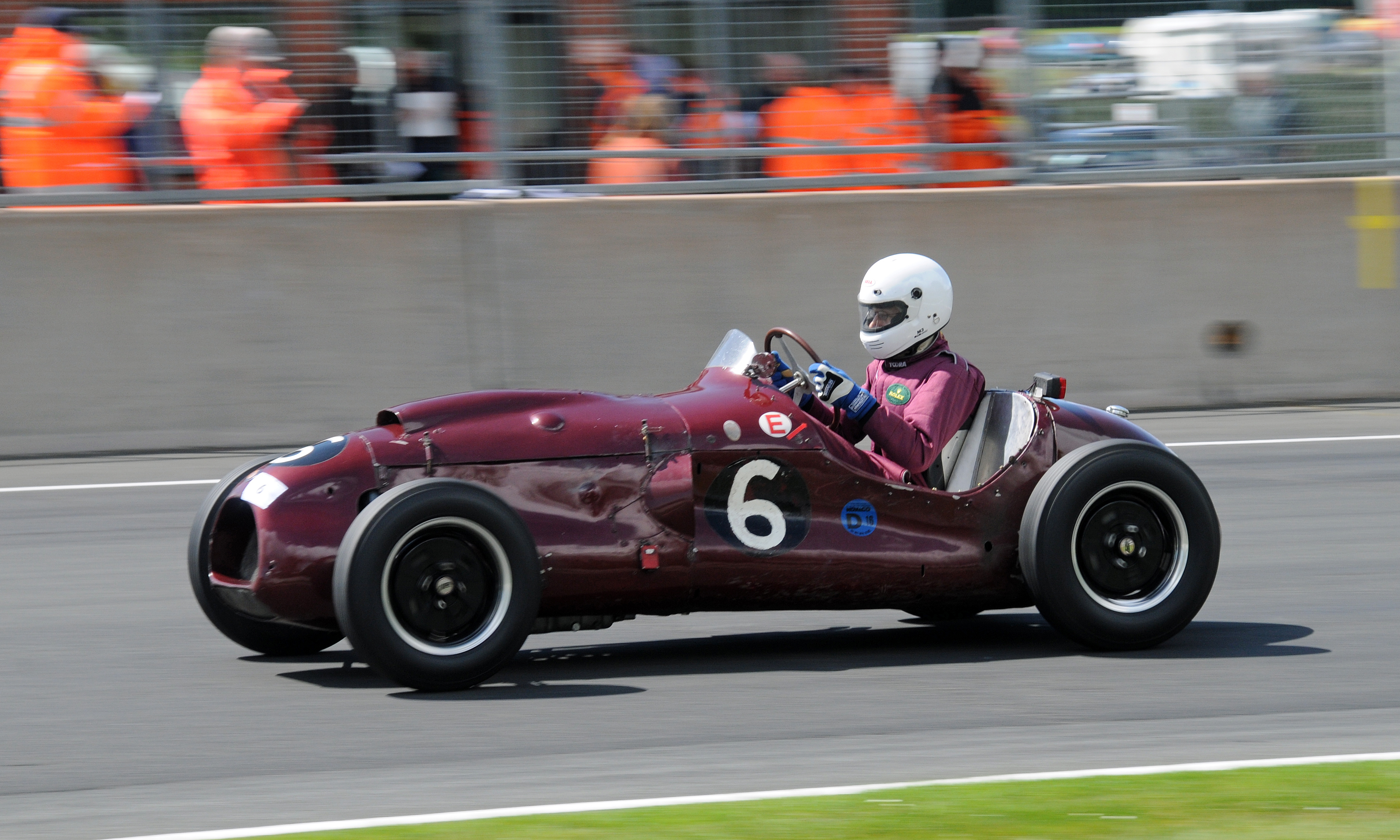
1953 Cooper-Bristol T24/25

The Cooper T24 is a Formula 2 racing car, built, designed and developed by the British manufacturer Cooper Cars in 1953. It was used in Formula 2 racing between 1953 and 1960, and briefly used in Formula One racing, in 1953 and 1954. Based on the Cooper T23, the main difference was that it was powered by a 2 litre Alta L-4 engine that allowed for more streamlined bodywork.

== Formula One World Championship results ==
(key) (results in bold indicate pole position; results in italics indicate fastest lap)

Year	Entrant	Engine	Tyres	Driver	1	2	3	4	5	6	7	8	9
1953	Cooper Car Company	Alta L4	**D**		ARG	500	NED	BEL	FRA	GBR	GER	SUI	ITA
1953	Cooper Car Company	Alta L4	**D**	Stirling Moss					Ret		6		NC
1953	Atlantic Stable	Alta L4	**D**	Peter Whitehead						NC			
1954	Peter Whitehead	Alta L4	**D**		ARG	500	BEL	FRA	GBR	GER	SUI	ITA	ESP
1954	Peter Whitehead	Alta L4	**D**	Peter Whitehead					Ret				
