= Paul Emery =

British racing driver (1916–1993)

- Born: 12 November 1916; Chiswick, London, England
- Died: 3 February 1993 (aged 76); Epsom, Surrey, England

Formula One World Championship career
- Nationality: (United Kingdom) British
- Active years: 1956, 1958
- Team(s): Emeryson, Connaught
- Entries: 2 (1 start)
- Championships: 0
- Wins: 0
- Podiums: 0
- Career points: 0
- Pole positions: 0
- Fastest laps: 0
- First entry: 1956 British Grand Prix
- Last entry: 1958 Monaco Grand Prix

Paul Emery (12 November 1916 – 3 February 1993) was a racing driver from England.

Emery was born in Chiswick, London. He built a number of front wheel drive 500cc Formula 3 cars named Emeryson and drove them himself. He participated in two World Championship Formula One Grands Prix, debuting on 14 July 1956 and numerous non-Championship Formula One races. He scored no championship points.

Emery died in 1993 at the age of 76.

== Complete Formula One World Championship results ==
(key)

Year	Entrant	Chassis	Engine	1	2	3	4	5	6	7	8	9	10	11	WDC	Points
1956	Emeryson Cars	Emeryson Mk1	Alta Straight-4	ARG	MON	500	BEL	FRA	GBR; Ret	GER	ITA				NC	0
1958	B C Ecclestone	Connaught Type B	Alta Straight-4	ARG	MON; DNQ	NED	500	BEL	FRA	GBR	GER	POR	ITA	MOR	NC	0
