= Alan Brown (racing driver) =

British racing driver (1919–2004)

- Born: 20 November 1919; Malton, Yorkshire, England
- Died: 20 January 2004 (aged 84); Guildford, Surrey, England

Formula One World Championship career
- Nationality: (United Kingdom) British
- Active years: 1952–1954
- Team: Cooper inc. non-works
- Entries: 9 (8 starts)
- Championships: 0
- Wins: 0
- Podiums: 0
- Career points: 2
- Pole positions: 0
- Fastest laps: 0
- First entry: 1952 Swiss Grand Prix
- Last entry: 1954 British Grand Prix

Alan Everest Brown (20 November 1919 – 20 January 2004) was a British racing driver from England. He took up motor racing in a Cooper, later forming the Ecurie Richmond team with Eric Brandon. He participated in nine World Championship Formula One Grands Prix, debuting on 18 May 1952 and numerous non-Championship Formula One races. He scored two championship points. He was the first driver to score championship points for Cooper and also gave the first Vanwall its race debut. After he retired, he fielded two drivers in the 1959 British Grand Prix under the team name Alan Brown Equipe.

== Complete Formula One World Championship results ==
(key)

| Year | Entrant | Chassis | Engine | 1 | 2 | 3 | 4 | 5 | 6 | 7 | 8 | 9 | WDC | Points |
|---|---|---|---|---|---|---|---|---|---|---|---|---|---|---|
| 1952 | Ecurie Richmond | Cooper T20 | Bristol Straight-6 | SUI; 5 | 500 | BEL; 6 | FRA | GBR; 22 | GER | NED | ITA; 15 | | 16th | 2 |
| 1953 | Cooper Car Company | Cooper T20 | Bristol Straight-6 | ARG; 9 | 500 | NED | BEL | FRA | | | | | NC | 0 |
| 1953 | RJ Chase | Cooper T23 | Bristol Straight-6 | | | | | | GBR; Ret | | | | NC | 0 |
| 1953 | Equipe Anglaise | Cooper T23 | Bristol Straight-6 | | | | | | | GER; Ret | SUI | ITA; 12 | NC | 0 |
| 1954 | Equipe Anglaise | Cooper T23 | Bristol Straight-6 | ARG | 500 | BEL | FRA | GBR; DNS | GER | SUI | ITA | ESP | NC | 0 |
