= Cooper T23 =

Racing automobile

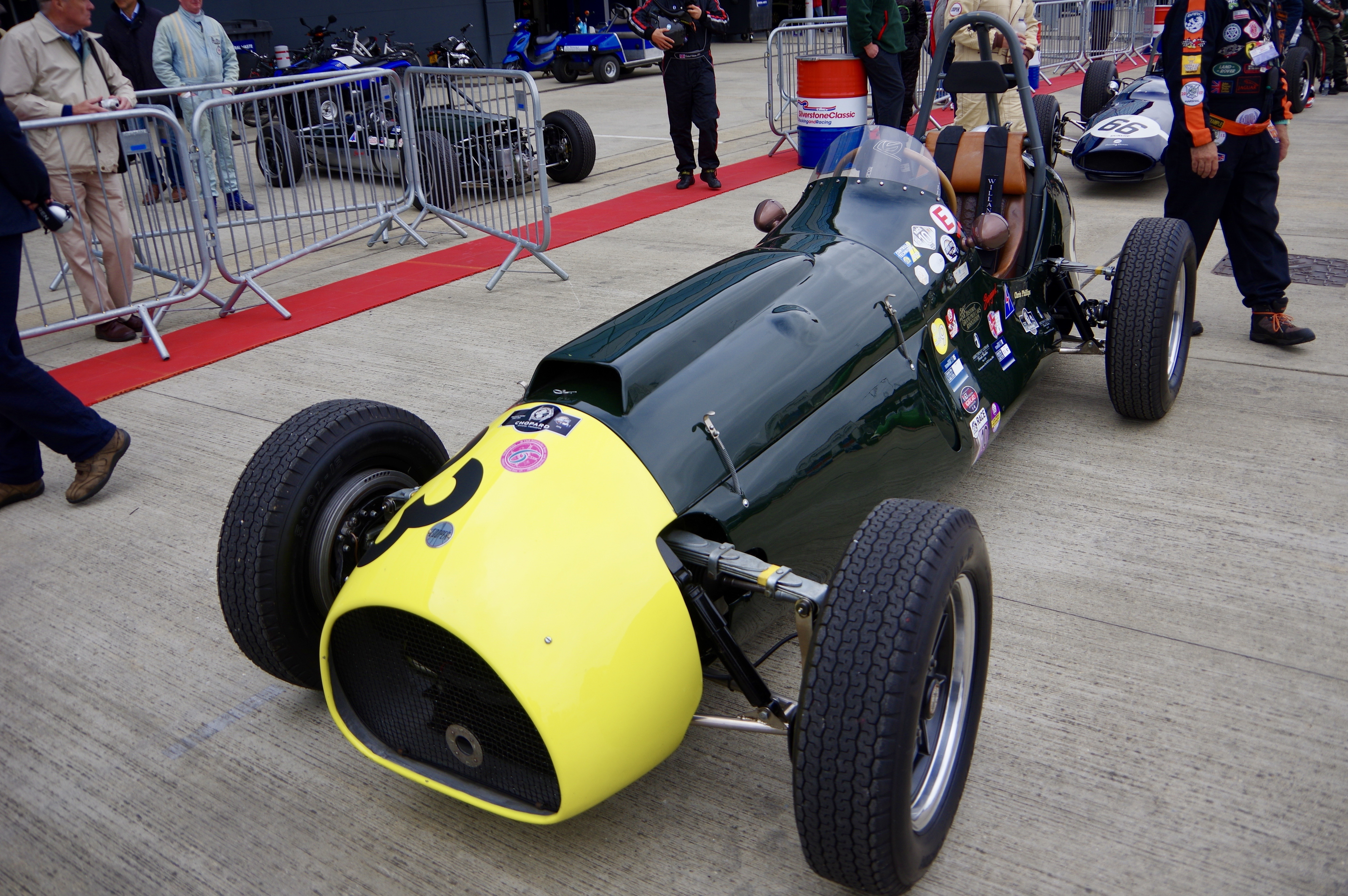
- Category: Formula One, Formula Two
- Constructor: Cooper Car Company
- Designer: Owen Maddock
- Predecessor: Cooper T20
- Successor: Cooper T24/Cooper T41

Technical specifications
- Chassis: Steel spaceframe
- Suspension (front): Lower wishbone, transverse leaf spring and damper
- Suspension (rear): Lower wishbone, transverse leaf spring and damper
- Axle track: 1,168 mm (46.0 in) (front), 1,175 mm (46.3 in) (rear)
- Wheelbase: 2,268 mm (89.3 in)
- Engine: Bristol BS1 1,971cc straight-6, naturally aspirated, longitudinally mounted, front-engine, rear-wheel-drive layout
- Transmission: Bristol 4 speed manual gearbox.
- Weight: 471 kg (1,038 lb)
- Brakes: Drum brakes all round
- Tyres: Dunlop

Competition history
- Notable entrants: Cooper Car Company
- Notable drivers: (United Kingdom) Ken Wharton (United Kingdom) Bob Gerard
- Debut: 1953 Argentine Grand Prix
Races	Wins	Poles	F/Laps
9	0	0	0

The Cooper T23, formally called the Cooper Mk.II, is a Formula 2 racing car, built, designed, and developed by British manufacturer Cooper Cars in 1953. It also competed in Formula One, in 9 Grand Prix between 1953 and 1956. It was powered by the Bristol six-cylinder 2-litre engine.

== Development ==
With the Cooper T23, which was also known as the Cooper-Bristol Mk.II, Cooper was able to draw on some experience in single-seater racing car construction. The car had a lightweight tubular frame and a body built with aerodynamics in mind. The engine got its cooling air from two cooling blocks that were installed in the front end. The exhaust gases were discharged laterally through two pipes. There are no similar vehicles from the T23. Changes were made to each new car and only the two works cars received a Bristol engine.

A version with De Dion rear axle and Alta engine was built for Stirling Moss, and at least two other Alta-engined cars were built, but they were no more successful than the Bristol-engined car. This variant is known as the Cooper T24.

== Racing history ==
The Cooper T23 competed in 9 Grands Prix between 1953 and 1956. John Barber was the first to drive it, on behalf of Cooper Car Company, at the 1953 Argentine Grand Prix. Qualified in sixteenth position, he finished eighth.

Bob Gerard, in a private capacity, was the last driver to use the single-seater, in the 1956 British Grand Prix. Qualified in twenty-second place, he finished eleventh.

Ken Wharton, who entered on a private basis, obtained the best result behind the wheel of this car, finishing seventh in the 1953 Swiss Motor Grand Prix where he qualified in ninth place.

The car was overall unsuccessful. In the Drivers' Championship, Bob Gerard and Ken Wharton failed to score points in 1953. Only in Australian Formula Libre racing has Jack Brabham achieved some good results with the T23.

== Formula One World Championship results ==
(key) (results in bold indicate pole position; results in italics indicate fastest lap)

Year	Entrant	Engine	Tyres	Driver	1	2	3	4	5	6	7	8	9
1953	Cooper Car Company	Bristol BS1 L6	D		ARG	500	NED	BEL	FRA	GBR	GER	SUI	ITA
1953	Cooper Car Company	Bristol BS1 L6	D	John Barber	8								
1953	Cooper Car Company	Bristol BS1 L6	D	Ken Wharton						8			
1953	Ken Wharton	Bristol BS1 L6	D	Ken Wharton			Ret		Ret			7	NC
1953	F.R. Gerard	Bristol BS1 L6	D	Bob Gerard					11	Ret			
1953	R.J. Chase	Bristol BS1 L6	D	Alan Brown						Ret			
1953	Equipe Anglaise	Bristol BS1 L6	D	Alan Brown							Ret		12
1953	Equipe Anglaise	Bristol BS1 L6	D	Helmut Glockler							DNS		
1953	Rodney Nuckey	Bristol BS1 L6	D	Rodney Nuckey							11		
1954	R.J. Chase	Bristol BS1 L6	D		ARG	500	BEL	FRA	GBR	GER	SUI	ITA	ESP
1954	R.J. Chase	Bristol BS1 L6	D	Alan Brown					DNS				
1954	Gould's Garage	Bristol BS1 L6	D	Horace Gould					15				
1954	F.R. Gerard	Bristol BS1 L6	D	Bob Gerard					10				
1954	Ecurie Richmond	Bristol BS1 L6	D	Eric Brandon					Ret				
1954	Ecurie Richmond	Bristol BS1 L6	D	Rodney Nuckey					DNS†				
1956	F.R. Gerard	Bristol BS1 L6	D		ARG	MON	500	BEL	FRA	GBR	GER	ITA	
1956	F.R. Gerard	Bristol BS1 L6	D	Bob Gerard						11			

† Nuckey was awarded a starting position despite not only not having practiced, but also not having a car to drive - Brandon drove the car.
