= Leslie Marr =

British painter and racing driver (1922–2021)

Sir Leslie Marr
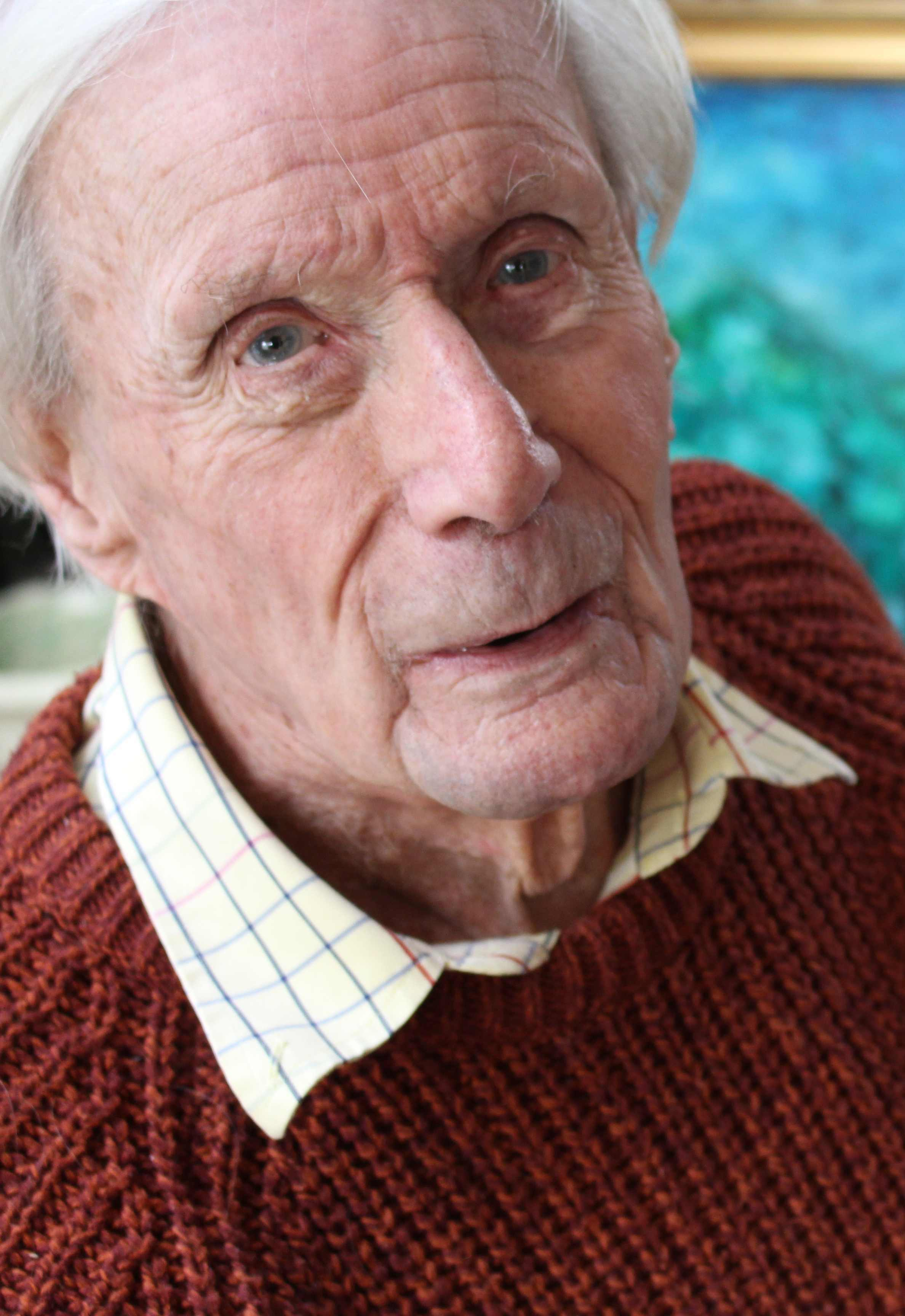
- Marr with a painting, 2019
- Born: 14 August 1922; Durham, County Durham, England
- Died: 4 May 2021 (aged 98); Gimingham, Norfolk, England

Formula One World Championship career
- Nationality: (United Kingdom) British
- Active years: 1954–1955
- Team: Privateer Connaught
- Entries: 2
- First entry: 1954 British Grand Prix
- Last entry: 1955 British Grand Prix

Sir Leslie Lynn Marr of Sunderland, 2nd Baronet (14 August 1922 – 4 May 2021) was a British landscape artist, painter and racing driver.

== Early life, education and military service ==
Marr was born in Durham, England, the son of Lieutenant Colonel and brevet Colonel John Lynn Marr (1877–1931), OBE, TD, of the Royal Garrison Artillery, director of two shipbuilding firms and of the Sunderland Forge and Engineering Company, and Amelia Rachel (1884–1971; known as "May"), daughter of Robert Thompson, of Over Dinsdale Hall, County Durham, a shipbuilder.

Marr was educated at Shrewsbury School and Pembroke College, Cambridge. In 1932, at the age of ten, due to his father's death the previous year he inherited the baronetcy held by his grandfather, shipbuilder Sir James Marr, 1st Baronet, though he did not use the title. He studied engineering at Cambridge University, where he graduated in 1942. During World War II he served as a technician in the Royal Air Force. His interest in painting developed during his posting to Palestine.

== Artistic career ==
Marr is recognised primarily as a landscape artist and painter. After the war ended, Marr attended life classes at Heatherley's Art School in Pimlico and subsequently studied under David Bomberg at what was then known as the Borough Polytechnic (now London South Bank University). He allocated the upper floor of a bookshop he had rented as an exhibition space for Bomberg's students (who became known as the Borough Group). Following the Group's dissolution in 1950, Marr continued to paint and to travel across Britain and the continent, and it was at this time that Marr tried his hand at motor racing.

Between 1983 and 1991, Marr lived and painted on Arran, and later moved to a home and studio in Norfolk. Artworks by Marr are held in the public collections of the British Academy, Imperial College Collection, Laing Art Gallery Newcastle upon Tyne, and Pallant House Gallery, Chichester.

== Racing career ==
Marr participated in two Formula One World Championship Grands Prix, making his debut on 17 July 1954 at the British Grand Prix. Racing in his private Connaught, he finished in 13th place, but retired from his last world championship race in 1955, after a damaged brake pipe caused him to spin off. Marr competed in several non-Championship races, with his best results including winning the 1955 Cornwall MRC Formula 1 Race and finishing fourth in the 1956 New Zealand Grand Prix.

== Personal life ==
In 1948, Marr married artist Dinora Mendelson (1924–2010), daughter of London art dealer Jacob Mendelson and artist Lilian Holt; Lilian's second husband was Marr's former teacher David Bomberg. Marr and his wife separated after two years, and were divorced in 1956. In 1962, Marr married Lynn Moynihan; they had two daughters, the elder of whom predeceased him. His third wife was Maureen Monk. Marr died in Gimingham, Norfolk in May 2021 at the age of 98, survived by his widow, daughter, and three grandchildren. He was succeeded as baronet by his first cousin twice removed, Allan James William Marr.

== Complete Formula One World Championship results ==
(key)

Year	Entrant	Chassis	Engine	1	2	3	4	5	6	7	8	9	WDC	Points
1954	Leslie Marr	Connaught Type A	Lea-Francis Straight-4	ARG	500	BEL	FRA	GBR; 13	GER	SUI	ITA	ESP	NC	0
1955	Leslie Marr	Connaught Type B	Alta Straight-4	ARG	MON	500	BEL	NED	GBR; Ret	ITA			NC	0

Baronetage of the United Kingdom
Preceded by James Marr	Baronet (of Sunderland); 1932–2021	Succeeded by Allan James William Marr
