= Turner Sports Cars =

British sports car manufacturer

Turner Sports Car Company Limited
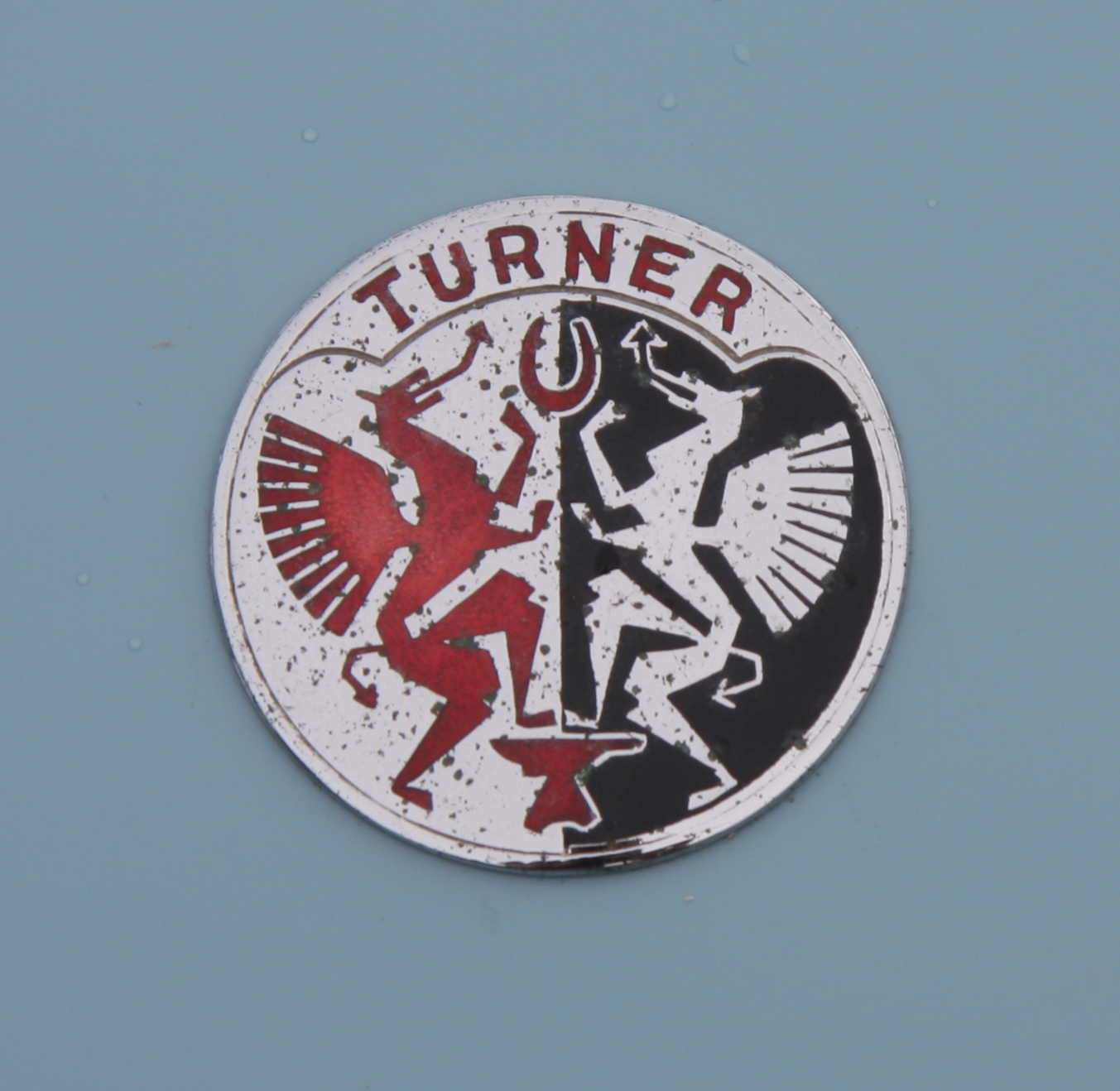
- Type: British car manufacturer
- Industry: Automobiles
- Founded: 1951
- Founder: Jack Turner
- Defunct: 1966
- Headquarters: Wolverhampton, United Kingdom
- Products: Turner Sports

Turner Sports Car Company Limited was a 1950s British sports car manufacturer, that closed in 1966.

== Background ==
The first Turner models were produced between 1951 and 1966 by Turner Sports Car Company Limited, a company established by Jack Turner near Wolverhampton, England. As well as complete cars, Turners were available in kit form. In 1966, the company closed, after the founder had a heart attack. The company's demise may also have been due to the development cost of a completely new coupé model with a rear-mounted Hillman Imp engine, the prototype of which was incomplete.

From the late 1940s, Jack Turner built a series of one-off specials, and prepared racing cars, including building his own engines. The first cars for sale were based on one of the specials, and consisted of chassis, independent suspension units using transverse leaf springs, and Turner's own alloy wheels. It was up to the customer to arrange engine, transmission and body. Eight are thought to have been made.

== Turner A30 and 950 Sports ==
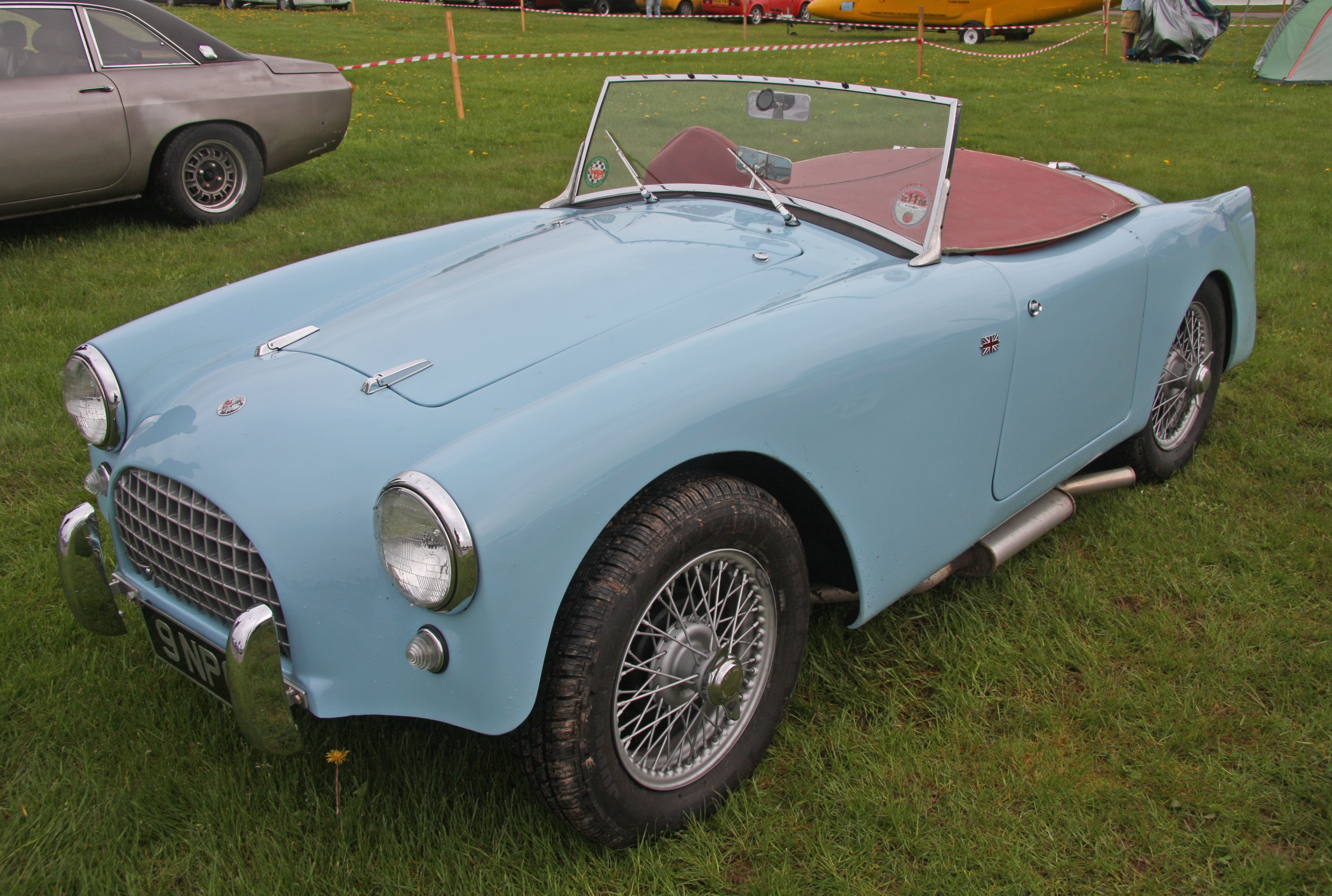
Turner 950 Sports

The first complete car was the Turner A30 Sports, a two-seater also known as the 803 and using an 803 cc Austin A30 engine, transmission and suspension. The car featured a simple ladder frame chassis and open fibreglass two-seater sports bodywork. As BMC would not supply components directly, they had to be purchased from dealers, which increased the price of the car. In 1956, the uprated 948 cc unit from the Austin A35 was adopted, and the model renamed Turner 950 Sports, but, apart from fully hydraulic brakes with optional front discs, was otherwise unchanged. The majority were exported mainly to the United States and South Africa.

In 1960, a Turner 950 Sports, with an Alexander-tuned engine with a crossflow cylinder head, was tested by the British Motor magazine. It had a top speed of 95.7 mph (154.0 km/h), and could accelerate from 0-60 mph (97 km/h) in 13.6 seconds. A fuel consumption of 36.0 miles per imperial gallon (7.8 L/100 km; 30.0 mpg_{‑US}) was recorded. The test car cost £1,052. Approximately 70-80 of the A30 model and 170 of the A35 model were made.

== Turner Sports Mk I ==
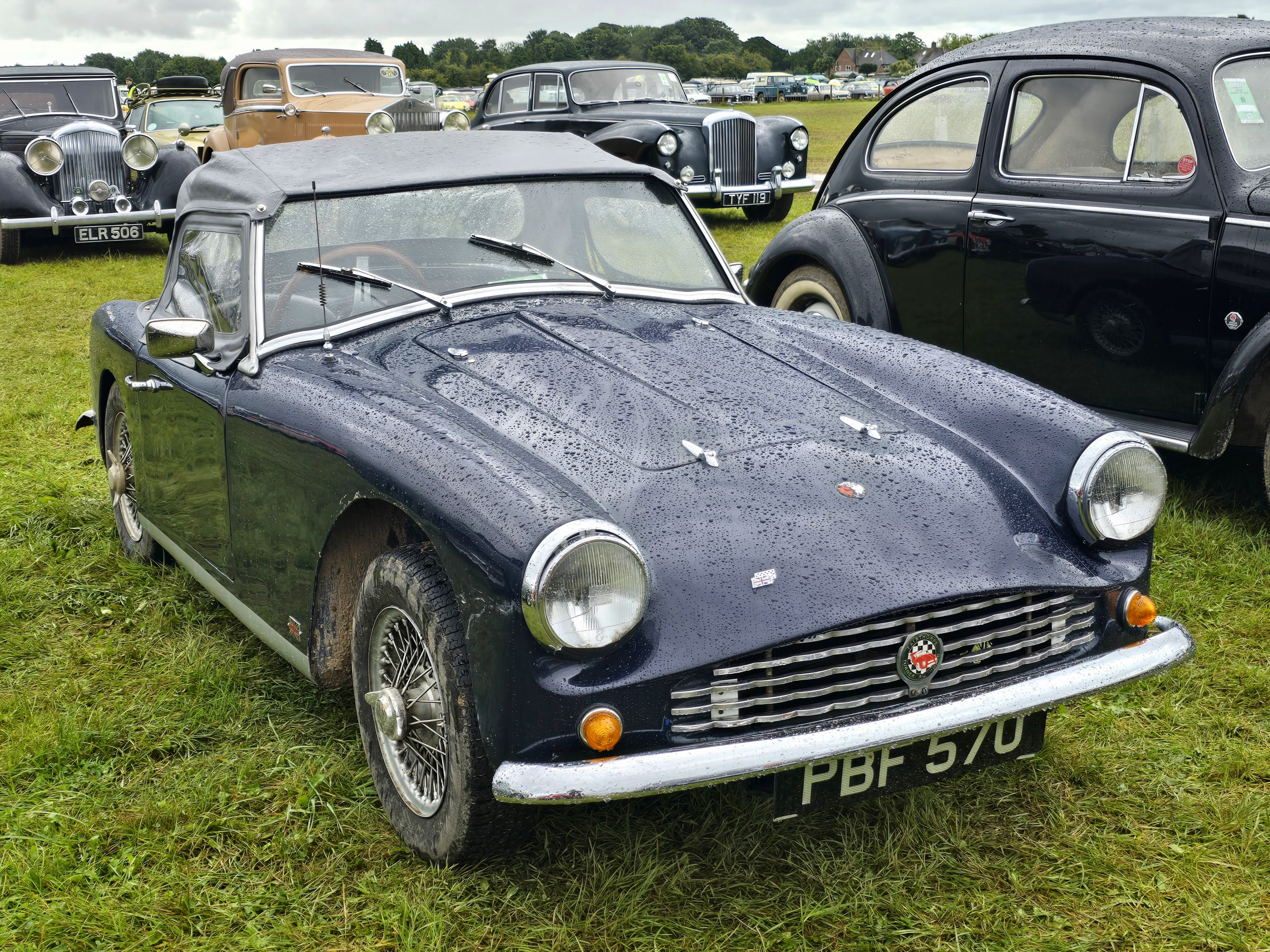
1961 Turner MK I

In 1959, the Turner Sports Mk I was introduced, and although similar to the outgoing model, featured substantial revisions to the body and chassis, and front disc brakes became an option. The 948 cc Austin engine powered version was named the Turner Sports Mk I, and versions known as Turner-Climaxes were also available with the powerful Coventry Climax 1,097 cc FWA and 1,216 FWE units. Almost 40 of the Sports Mk I models were made.

== Turner Sports Mk II ==
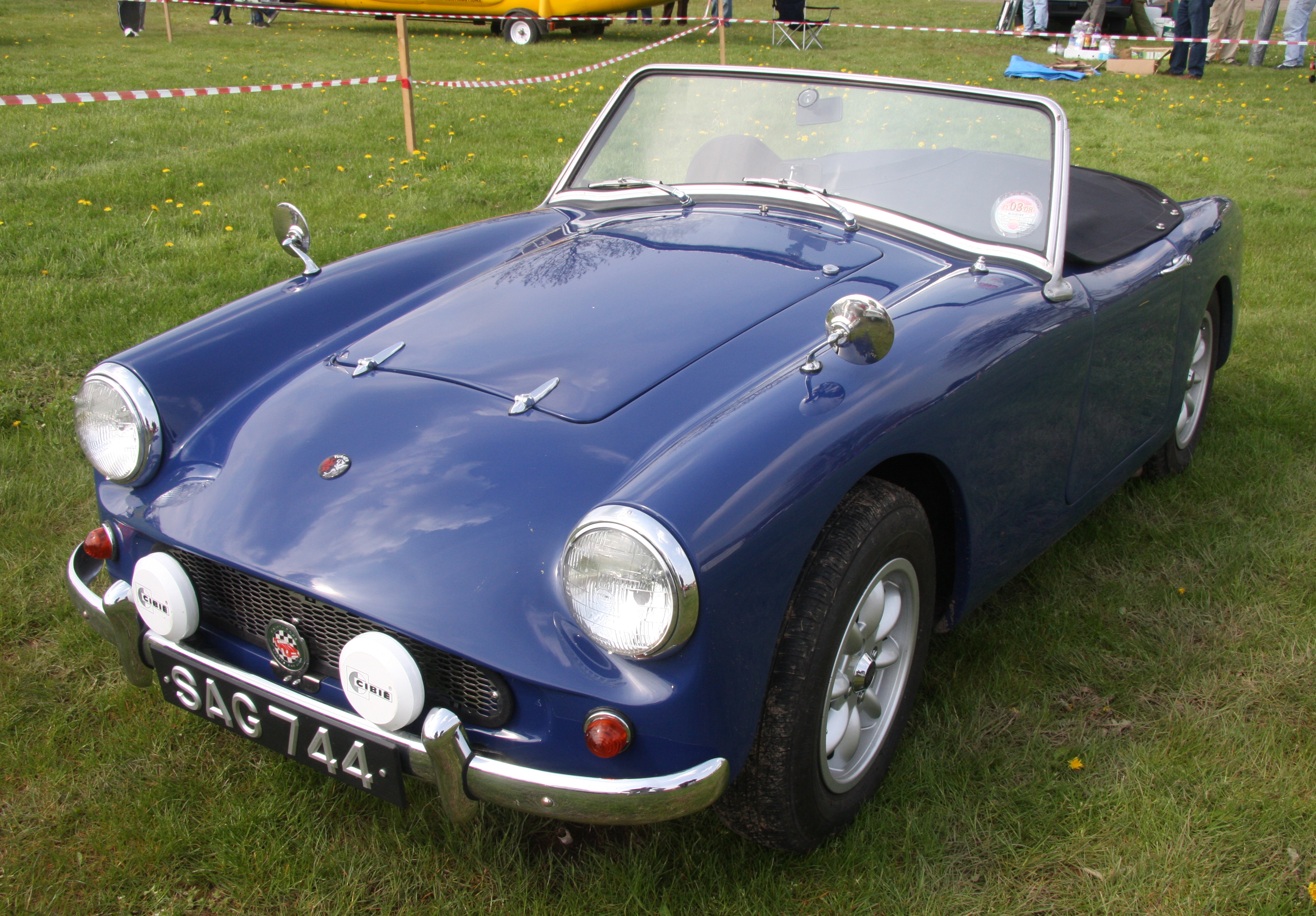
Turner Sports Mk II

In 1960, a Turner Sports Mk II model appeared, with improved interior trim and further minor styling revisions. From 1960, the front suspension became Triumph Herald-based. In 1961, as well as the Austin and Coventry Climax engines, other options were introduced, such as the Ford 105E 997 cc and 109E 1,340 cc units. Finally, in 1963, the new Ford Cortina 1,500 cc engine was also made available. About 150 Turner Sports Mk II models were made. Many Turners had successful racing careers, such as VUD 701 driven by John E Miles in the Autosport National Race Championship of 1963–64, winning outright 15 of the 17 races against the works cars of Jaguar, Lotus and Aston Martin. Fully developed as a space-framed Modsports Race Car using a Cosworth engineered Ford 1824 cc engine, VUD 701 is known to be the fastest of all the racing Turner Sports Cars, holding many UK class lap records to the present day.

== Turner GT ==
In early 1962, a completely new, larger, fixed-head Turner GT had been introduced, at the London Racing Car Show. It had a glass fibre monocoque centre section and could be had with a choice of Ford or Coventry Climax engines. Only nine of this model were produced, all believed to be fitted with the Ford 1,500 cc engine, before the model was discontinued then in 1964.

== Turner Sports Mk III ==
In late 1963, the final model was introduced as the Turner Sports Mk III, and featured a tuned version of the Ford 1,500 cc engine as standard. Externally, the bonnet gained a large air scoop. This model remained in production until the company went into liquidation in April 1966, when approximately 100 had been produced.

== See also ==
- List of car manufacturers of the United Kingdom
