= Tony Crook (racing driver) =

British racing driver (1920–2014)

- Born: 16 February 1920; Rusholme, Manchester, England
- Died: 21 January 2014 (aged 93); Kingston upon Thames, London, England

Formula One World Championship career
- Nationality: (United Kingdom) British
- Active years: 1952 - 1953
- Team(s): Non-works Frazer Nash, Cooper
- Entries: 2
- Championships: 0
- Wins: 0
- Podiums: 0
- Career points: 0
- Pole positions: 0
- Fastest laps: 0
- First entry: 1952 British Grand Prix
- Last entry: 1953 British Grand Prix

Thomas Anthony Donald Crook (16 February 1920 – 21 January 2014) was a racing driver from England. He was born in Manchester and educated at Clifton College, Bristol. He participated in two Formula 2 Grand Prix races counting towards the World Championship of Drivers, debuting on 19 July 1952. He scored no championship points. He also participated in several non-championship races.

Crook had a successful career as a racing driver outside of Formula 2 amassing nearly 400 win or place finishes between 1946 and 1955. His career ended after an accident that season, but he had been planning to retire in 1955 anyway. In his capacity as a motor dealer in Surrey, Crook specialised in Bristols and became part owner of the Bristol company in 1960, before taking full ownership in 1973. He retained the sole ownership of Bristol Cars until 1997 and part ownership until 2002 but remained with the company until his retirement in 2007.

== Racing record ==
=== Complete Formula One World Championship results ===
(key)

Year	Entrant	Chassis	Engine	1	2	3	4	5	6	7	8	9	WDC	Pts
1952	T A D Crook	Frazer Nash 421	BMW 328 2.0 L6	SUI	500	BEL	FRA	GBR; 21	GER	NED	ITA		NC	0
1953	T A D Crook	Cooper T20	Bristol BS1 2.0 L6	ARG	500	NED	BEL	FRA	GBR; Ret	GER	SUI	ITA	NC	0

== See also ==
- Bristol 406 Zagato
