= Cooper-Bristol =

Formula 2 racing car

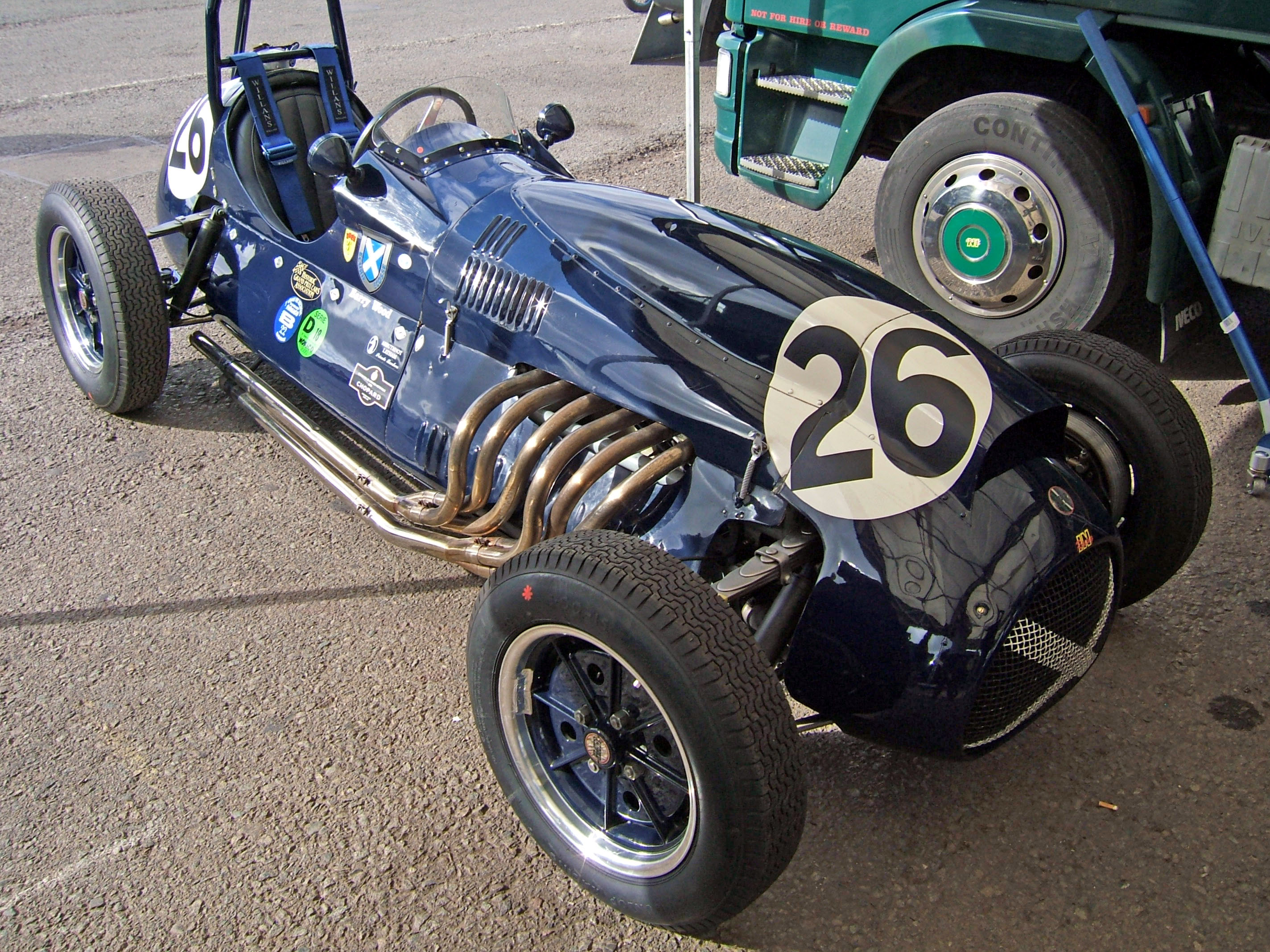
Cooper-Bristol T20 at Donington Park in 2007

The Cooper-Bristol, formally called the Cooper Mk.I or the Cooper T20, is a Formula 2 racing car, built, designed, and developed by British manufacturer Cooper Cars in 1952.

== Development history and technology ==
With the T20 in 1952, Cooper not only interrupted the series of Formula 3 racing cars, but also built the first vehicle for Formula 2. The designation T was originally introduced by Cooper for the 500 cubic centimeter racing car. These racing cars ran in Formula 3.

Through this commitment, Cooper had a large customer base of drivers and their sponsors. Many of them wanted to enter the highest class of motorsport and expected a car from Cooper to do so. The answer was quickly found there and the T20 was developed. The T20 was based on the T15 and, like there, had the engine in a simple frame in front of the driver. The suspension and wheels were also taken over from the T15.

== Racing history ==
The engine used was the 2-liter engine from Bristol, a six-cylinder, the basis of which was the engine from the BMW 328. The engine made about 130 hp. Therefore, the car had to be light and easy to handle in order to keep up with the Ferrari that dominated at the time. As expected, the car had no chance against the vehicles from Italy, but it did score the first points for Cooper in the Formula 1 World Championship by Alan Brown at the Swiss Grand Prix in 1952. Mike Hawthorn achieved his first success on a T20 and in Britain became a popular racing driver almost overnight.

== Complete Formula One World Championship results ==
(key)

Year	Entrant	Engine	Tyres	Driver	1	2	3	4	5	6	7	8	9
1952	Leslie D. Hawthorn	Bristol BS1 2.0 L6	D		SUI	500	BEL	FRA	GBR	GER	NED	ITA	
1952	Leslie D. Hawthorn	Bristol BS1 2.0 L6	D	(United Kingdom) Mike Hawthorn			4		3		4	NC	
1952	AHM Bryde	Bristol BS1 2.0 L6	D	(United Kingdom) Mike Hawthorn				Ret					
1952	AHM Bryde	Bristol BS1 2.0 L6	D	(United Kingdom) Reg Parnell					7				
1952	Ecurie Richmond	Bristol BS1 2.0 L6	D	(United Kingdom) Alan Brown	8		9		20			13	
1952	Ecurie Richmond	Bristol BS1 2.0 L6	D	(United Kingdom) Eric Brandon	5		6		22			15	
1952	Ecurie Ecosse	Bristol BS1 2.0 L6	D	(United Kingdom) David Murray					Ret				
1953	Cooper Car Company	Bristol BS1 2.0 L6	D		ARG	500	NED	BEL	FRA	GBR	GER	SUI	ITA
1953	Cooper Car Company	Bristol BS1 2.0 L6	D	(Argentina) Adolfo Schwelm Cruz	Ret								
1953	Cooper Car Company	Bristol BS1 2.0 L6	D	(United Kingdom) Alan Brown	9								
1953	Ecurie Ecosse	Bristol BS1 2.0 L6	D	(United Kingdom) Jimmy Stewart						Ret			
1953	Tony Crook	Bristol BS1 2.0 L6	D	(United Kingdom) Tony Crook						Ret			
