= Horace Richards =

British amateur racing driver (1902–1961)

- Born: Horace Albert Richards; 1 November 1902 Birmingham, England
- Died: 18 November 1961 (aged 59) Birmingham

Horace Albert Richards (1 November 1902 – 18 November 1961) was a garage owner and amateur racing driver, who took part in a number of British Formula 1 and Formula 2 races in the 1950s, in a car of his own manufacture.

== Career ==
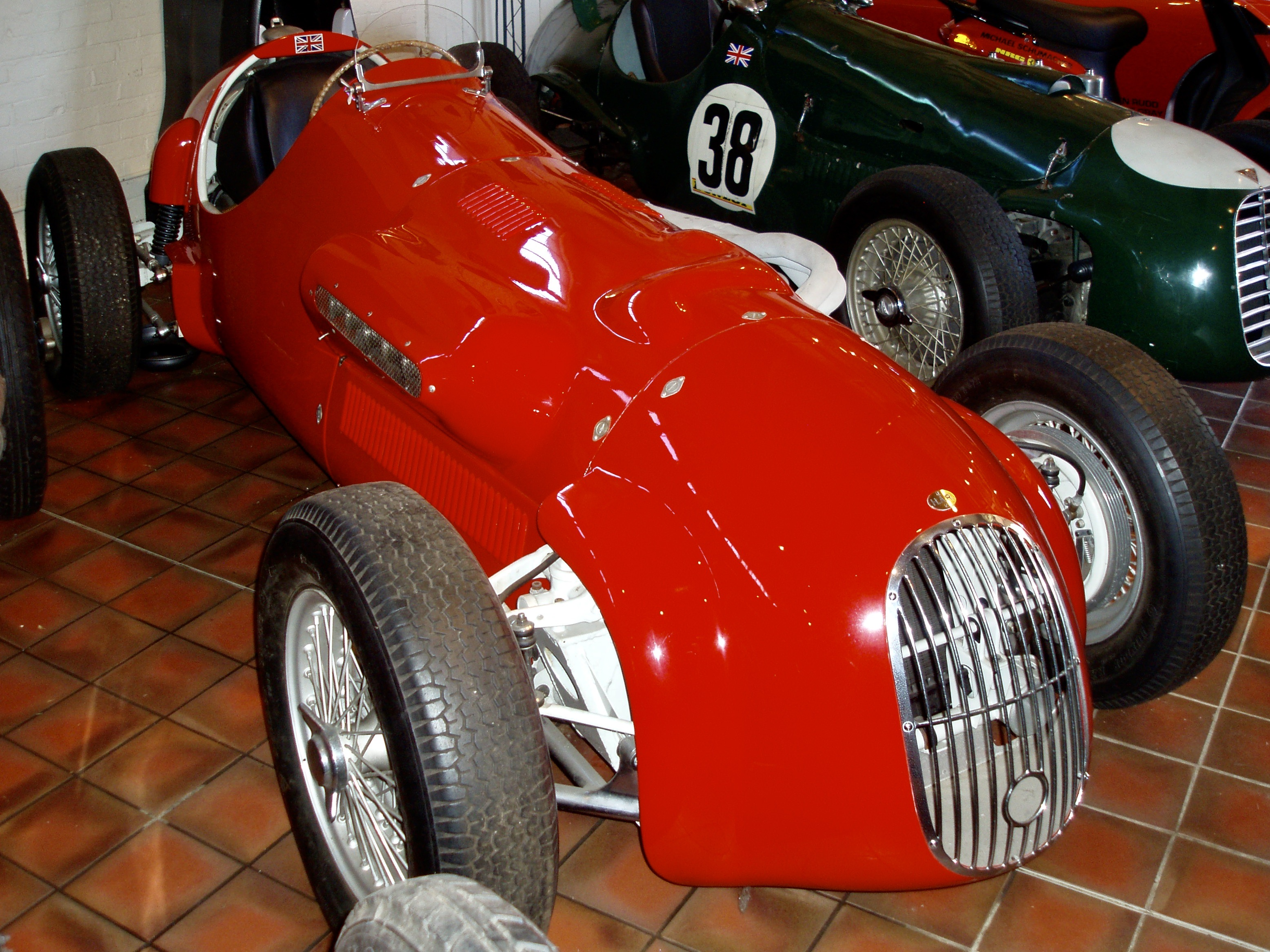
The second H.A.R. chassis, at the Brooklands Museum in 2009

Richards ran a garage on the corner of Halfords Lane and Oxford Road in Smethwick and had started speedway racing in 1933; he started to race Rileys after the Second World War, gaining 22 victories in a Riley 9. With the introduction of the new Formula 2 in 1952, Richards built his own car - named the H.A.R. after his initials - to conform to the formula. He built a second example, dubbed the Woden, for Walsall industrialist Bertie Bradnack, and also made a number of hillclimbing specials.

Richards used the H.A.R. at numerous domestic British racing events, as well as a few international-class events, although never in the World Championship. Racing purely for pleasure, Richards mostly pootled around at the back, occasionally to the laughter of the crowd, and at his most high-profile race - the 1954 BRDC International Trophy - he finished his 15-lap heat 3 laps down, and the 35-lap final 8 laps down.

In 1960, he fit the H.A.R. with an appropriate 1.1 litre Riley engine for the new Formula Junior, and entered it for occasional races, the last of which was at Mallory Park in September 1961. Richards died suddenly two months later, survived by his widow Evelyn.
