= H.A.R. =

English racing car manufacturer, 1952–61

- Full name: H.A. Richards Racing
- Base: Smethwick, United Kingdom
- Founder(s): Horace Richards
- Noted drivers: (United Kingdom) Horace Richards

Formula One World Championship career
- First entry: n/a
- Races entered: 0
- Constructors' Championships: 0
- Drivers' Championships: 0
- Race victories: 0
- Pole positions: 0
- Fastest laps: 0
- Final entry: n/a

H.A.R. was a marque created by Smethwick garage owner and engineer Horace Richards, and named after his initials, the name used for two racing cars in the 1950s.

== Chassis no. 1 ==
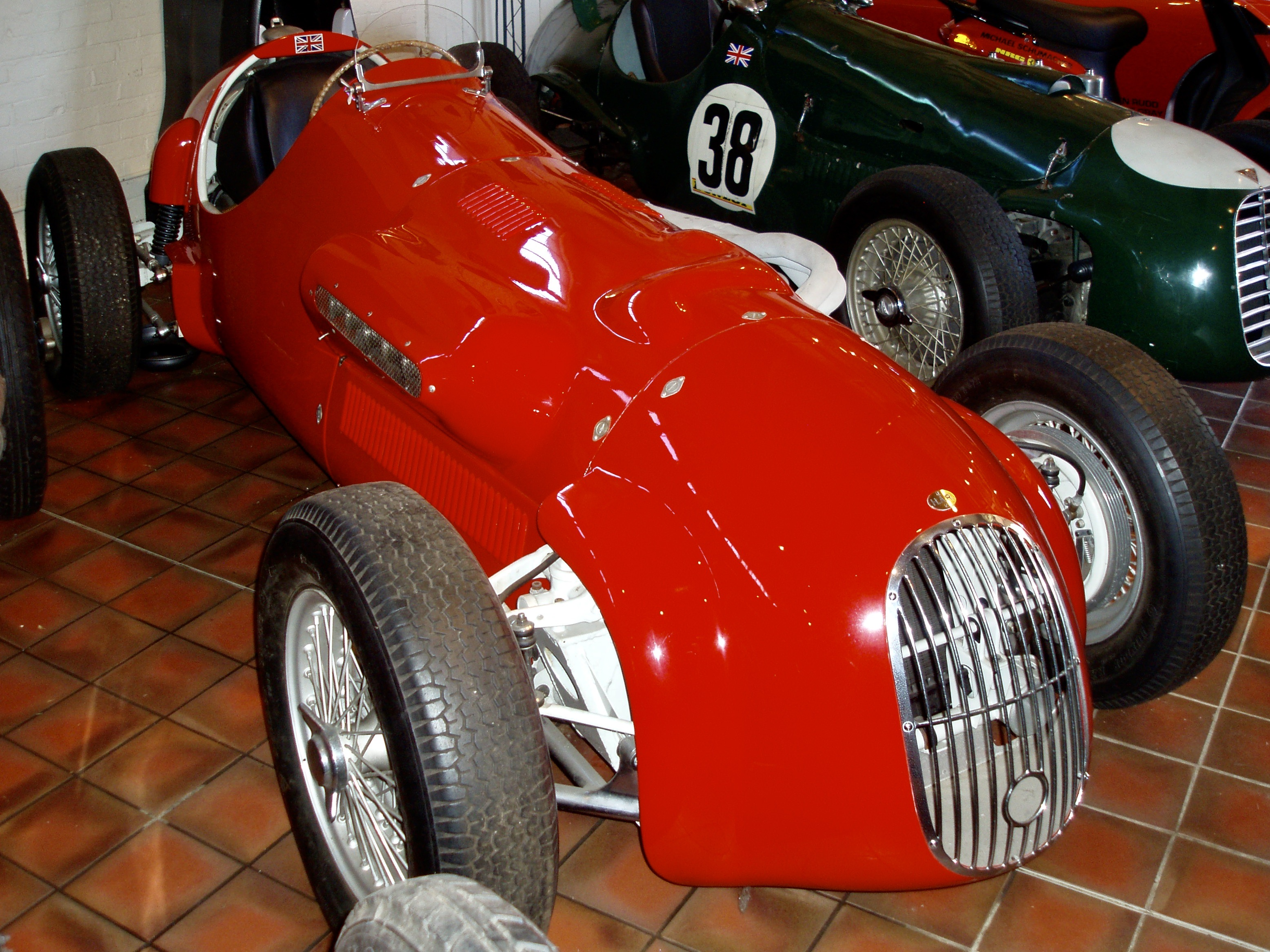
The second H.A.R. chassis, with a Jaguar engine, at the Brooklands Museum, 2009

The first model built was a Formula 2 car powered by Riley engines, modified by Richards, with room for engines of 1,100cc, 1,500cc, or 2,000cc capacity depending on requirements. The car was built on the ladder-frame principle, with separate sections for scuttle and tail, and a low transmission tunnel meant the car was lower than most contemporary competitors. Richards entered the car in Formula 2 races, and from 1954 Formula 1 races, usually pootling at the back to avoid trouble. Richards' swansong with the car came in Formula Junior in 1960 and 1961.

Richards never entered a World Championship Grand Prix; he took part in a Formule Libre supporting the 1953 British Grand Prix, even though the H.A.R. was eligible for the Grand Prix itself. However he finished 11th and last, 4 laps down in a 17 lap race.

== Chassis no. 2 ==
In 1952, Richards built a copy of the Formula 2 car for Bertie Bradnack, which Bradnack christened Woden; it never started a race. Bradnack sold the chassis on to Northern Irish enthusiast Jim Berry, who restored the H.A.R. name and fitted an E.R.A. engine for races from 1954 to 1958s, and - with the E.R.A. engine swapped out to be fitted to Berry's E.R.A. chassis, and a Jaguar 3.4 litre engine fitted - it was eventually used in Australian historic racing in the 1970s.

== Other projects ==
Richards built a handful of hillclimbing specials under different names, and prepared another chassis to accept a 2.3 litre Bugatti engine, which was never completed. An H.A.R. rear end was also incorporated into a Frazer Nash special.
