= Piero Taruffi =

Italian racing driver and motorcycle road racer (1906–1988)

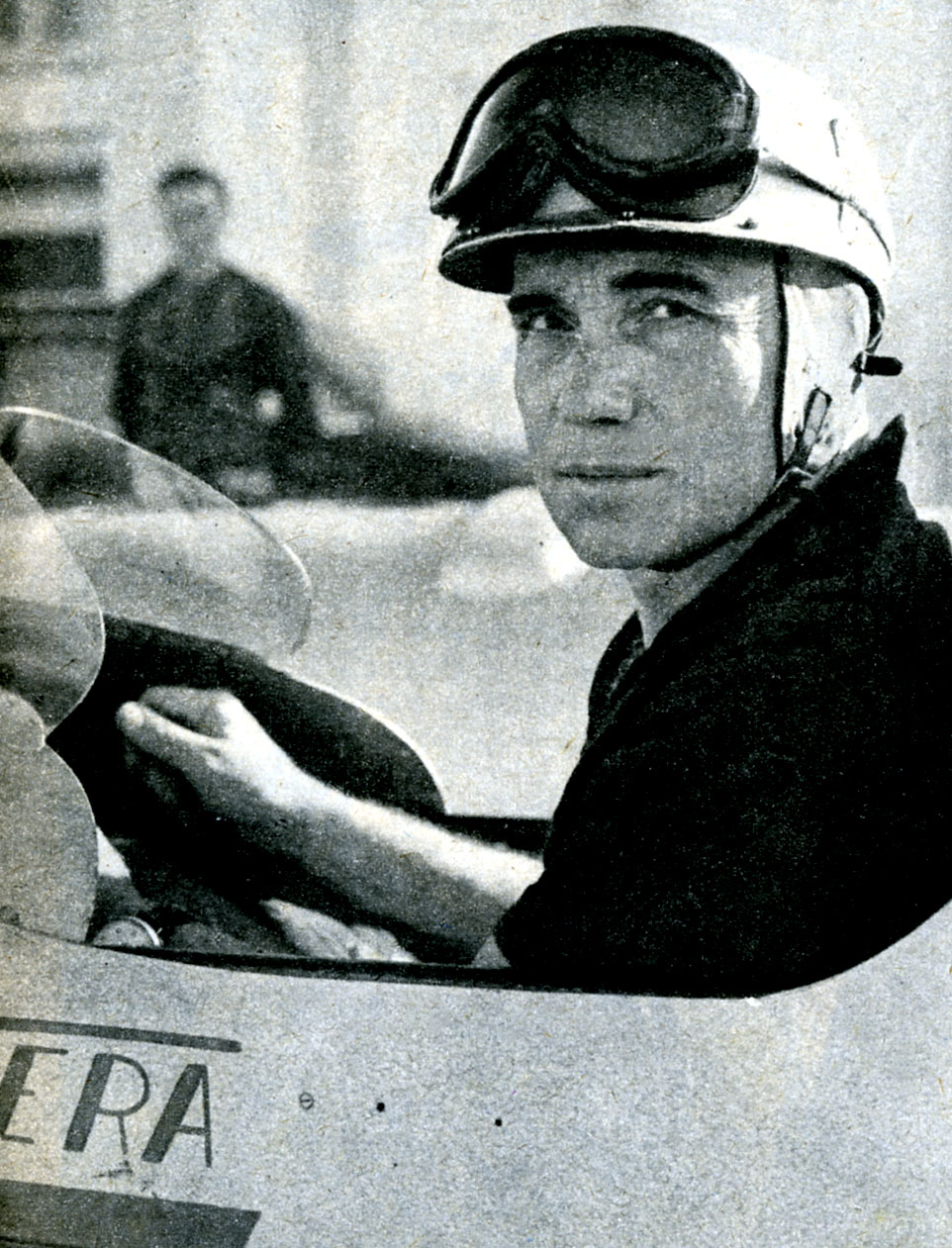
- Taruffi in 1957
- Born: Pierino Antonio Alberto Taruffi; 12 October 1906; Albano Laziale, Rome, Kingdom of Italy
- Died: 12 January 1988 (aged 81); Rome, Italy
- Spouses: Isabella Rotti (m. 1952)

Formula One World Championship career
- Nationality: (Italy) Italian
- Active years: 1950–1952, 1954–1956
- Team(s): Alfa Romeo, Ferrari, Mercedes, Maserati, Vanwall
- Entries: 18
- Championships: 0
- Wins: 1
- Podiums: 5
- Career points: 41
- Pole positions: 0
- Fastest laps: 1
- First entry: 1950 Italian Grand Prix
- First win: 1952 Swiss Grand Prix
- Last entry: 1956 Italian Grand Prix

Pierino Antonio Alberto Taruffi (12 October 1906 – 12 January 1988) was an Italian racing driver, motorcycle road racer, motorsport executive and engineer, who competed in Formula One from 1950 to 1956. Taruffi won the 1952 Swiss Grand Prix with Ferrari. In endurance racing, Taruffi won the Mille Miglia in 1957, also with Ferrari. In Grand Prix motorcycle racing, Taruffi won the 1932 European Championship in the premier 500cc class with Norton.

Born and raised in Rome, Taruffi started his career in motorcycle racing, winning the 500cc European Championship in 1932 with Norton. He also held the motorcycle land-speed record for 38 days in 1937, reaching a speed of 274.18 km/h on the Autostrada Serenissima whilst riding a 492cc Gilera. Taruffi competed in Formula One for Alfa Romeo, Ferrari, Mercedes, Maserati and Vanwall, winning the Swiss Grand Prix in 1952 with Ferrari and finishing third in the World Drivers' Championship that season.

Outside of Formula One, Taruffi competed extensively in sportscar racing, winning the final edition of the Mille Miglia with Ferrari, driving the 315 S and retiring upon his victory. He also managed the Gilera motorcycle team throughout his career, designing the record-breaking Cisitalia Tarf and Gilera Rondine.

== Motorcycle racing career ==
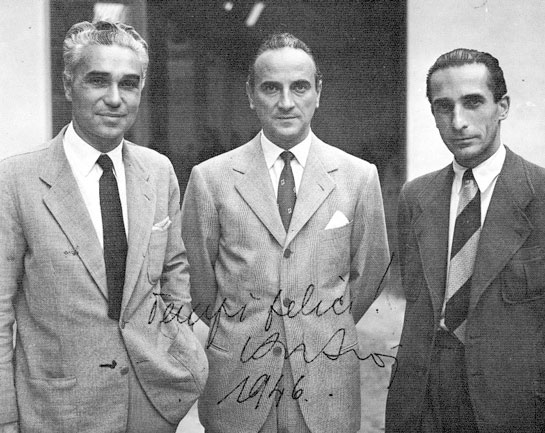
Cisitalia people. From left: Taruffi, Piero Dusio and Giovanni Savonuzzi.

Taruffi began his motorsport career racing motorcycles. He won the 1932 500cc European Championship on a Norton and in 1937 set the motorcycle land speed record at 279.503 km/h (173.68 mph).

== Sportscar racing career ==
Taruffi drove a newly introduced 2-litre, 4-cylinder Ferrari in the 1951 Bari Grand Prix, finishing third behind Juan Manuel Fangio and Froilán González. He completed the 360 km race with a time of 2 hours 58 minutes 40 3/5 seconds. In November 1951 Taruffi participated in the Carrera Panamericana in Mexico. He finished first in the opening leg from Mexico City to León, Guanajuato, a 267-mile (430 km) leg. Taruffi led second-placed Troy Ruttman by more than four minutes. Taruffi trimmed a further 15 minutes on the Mexico City-Leon leg and another 21 minutes between Leon and Durango. In the process he climbed from 12th to third overall. Taruffi and Luigi Chinetti eventually won the race on 25 November, with a time of 21:57:52. His average speed was 87.6 mph (140.97 km/h).

Taruffi set a world record for 50 miles (80 km) in an auto of 22 cubic centimetre (1.3 in^{3}) displacement in January 1952. He attempted a 100-mile (160 km) record but his motor failed after 98 miles (158 km). Taruffi was in a two-litre Ferrari for the running of the third Grand Prix de France, in Paris in May 1952. He captured first place with a time of three hours over a distance of 285 miles (459 km). His average speed was 95 mph (153 km/h). Taruffi placed second to Fangio in the 1953 Carrera Panamericana, with a time of 18:18:51 in a Lancia D24. His time was better than the previous year when he was victorious. In March 1954, Taruffi lost the 12 hours of Sebring with an hour to go, after having led the first three hours, when his Lancia stopped. He pushed it to the pits and team mechanics began working on it with diligence. Taruffi was still out of the car when the O.S.C.A. shared by Stirling Moss and Bill Lloyd crossed the finish line. Taruffi had averaged 81.1 miles per hour (130.5 km/h) before he retired. Taruffi won the 1,080-kilometre (670 mi) Giro di Sicilia in April 1954. His time of 10 hours 24 minutes 37 seconds established a record for an event which opened Italy's sports car racing season. It was 14 years old at the time. He averaged 64.4 miles per hour (103.6 km/h) in a Lancia D24.

Taruffi and Harry Schell placed fifth overall at Sebring in 1955, driving a Ferrari 750 Monza. Taruffi claimed first place in a Ferrari, at the 1955 Tour of Sicily, with an overall time of 10 hours 11 minutes 19.4 seconds, with an average speed of 105.998 kilometres per hour (65.864 mph). Taruffi dropped out of the 1955 Mille Miglia, when he suffered a broken oil pump on the course north of Rome. He and eventual winner, Stirling Moss, were vying for the lead in the early stages of the race. Cesare Perdisa won by 22 seconds in the 1955 Grand Prix of Imola, driving a two-litre Maserati. Taruffi spun his car into a straw bale at the edge of the track on the first lap. He was uninjured, though his car was damaged, and he was forced to retire from the race. Jean Behra and Taruffi teamed to secure a fifth-place finish in a Maserati at the 1956 Sebring 12 hours. Taruffi established a world record for Class E cars in June 1956. He raced 100 miles (160 km) in 46 minutes 27.2 seconds, an average of 129.9 miles per hour (209.04 km/h). Also at Monza, Taruffi broke the one-hour mark of 212.543 kilometres per hour (132.074 mph). A third record he performed was for 200 kilometres. His time was 53 minutes 14.5 seconds. In the 17th running of the Tour of Sicily, in 1957, Taruffi had a small crash while in pursuit of leader Olivier Gendebien. He touched the wall in Gioiosa Marea but continued in his Maserati. Gendebien won in a Ferrari. During the event, J. Olivari was burned to death when his Maserati hit a wall on the course.

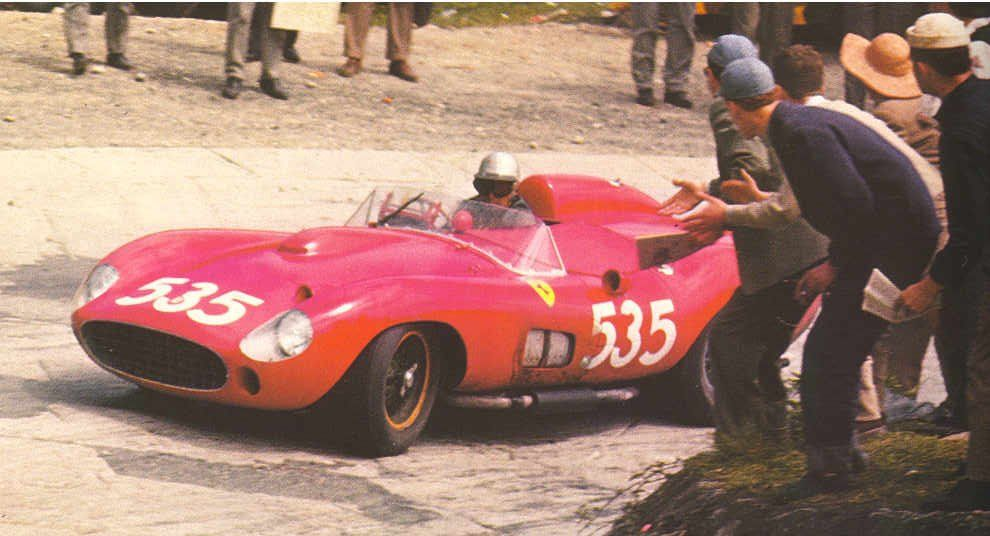
Piero Taruffi during the 1957 Mille Miglia

Taruffi's last victory was at the 1957 Mille Miglia, the last competitive edition of the Italian race, where he won in a Ferrari 315 S. At the race, Alfonso de Portago suffered a tire failure and crashed his car into the crowd, killing himself, his co-driver Edmund Nelson, and nine spectators. Following this, Taruffi officially retired from competitive racing. He was 50 years of age.

== Formula One career ==
Taruffi participated in 18 World Championship Grands Prix, debuting on 3 September 1950. Taruffi drove a Ferrari to victory in the May 1952 Swiss Grand Prix. He led from the start, with the Ferrari of Rudolf Fischer coming in second. Over the course of six seasons, he scored a total of 41 championship points. He also participated in numerous non-championship Formula One races. His best season was 1952 where he finished third behind Giuseppe Farina and World Champion Alberto Ascari.

== Stockcar racing career ==
Taruffi drove a Ford stock car owned by Floyd Clymer of Los Angeles in the 2,000-mile (3,200 km) Pan-American race held in November 1954.

== Other ventures ==
In 1959, Taruffi authored the book The Technique of Motor Racing. In November 1957 the Saturday Evening Post published Taruffi's article, Stop us before we kill again, where he discussed the 1955 Le Mans and 1957 Mille Miglia races where drivers and numerous spectators lost their lives.

In August 1952, Taruffi designed and patented a racing car with the entry 2,608, 264. The car featured three torpedo-shaped parallel bodies joined together. Independent twin motors and wheels were in the two larger bodies, at left and right. The driver and the passengers sit in the car's central part. The central portion is both higher and smaller than the others. Taruffi commented on the low wind resistance and low centre of gravity of his design. Taruffi died in Rome in 1988, age 81.

== Legacy ==
The Piero Taruffi Museum is located in Bagnoregio, a small town between Viterbo and Orvieto in Central Italy. The museum collection includes a selection of vintage cars and motorbikes from Taruffi's racing career.

In the 2023 biographical sports drama film Ferrari, Taruffi is portrayed by American actor Patrick Dempsey.

== Complete World Championship Grand Prix results ==
(key) (Races in italics indicate fastest lap)

Year	Entrant	Chassis	Engine	1	2	3	4	5	6	7	8	9	WDC	Points
1950	SA Alfa Romeo	Alfa Romeo 158	Alfa Romeo Straight-8	GBR	MON	500	SUI	BEL	FRA	ITA; Ret *			NC	0
1951	Scuderia Ferrari	Ferrari 375 F1	Ferrari V12	SUI; 2	500	BEL; Ret	FRA	GBR	GER; 5	ITA; 5	ESP; Ret		6th	10
1952	Scuderia Ferrari	Ferrari 500	Ferrari Straight-4	SUI; 1	500	BEL; Ret	FRA; 3	GBR; 2	GER; 4	NED	ITA; 7		**3rd**	**22**
1954	Scuderia Ferrari	Ferrari 625	Ferrari Straight-4	ARG	500	BEL	FRA	GBR	GER; 6	SUI	ITA; DNA	ESP	NC	0
1955	Scuderia Ferrari	Ferrari 555	Ferrari Straight-4	ARG	MON; 8 †	500	BEL; DNA	NED					6th	9
1955	Daimler Benz AG	Mercedes-Benz W196	Mercedes-Benz Straight-8						GBR; 4	ITA; 2			6th	9
1956	Officine Alfieri Maserati	Maserati 250F	Maserati Straight-6	ARG	MON	500	BEL	FRA; Ret	GBR	GER			NC	0
1956	Vandervell Products Ltd.	Vanwall	Vanwall Straight-4								ITA; Ret		NC	0

* Indicates shared drive with Juan Manuel Fangio
† Indicates shared drive with Paul Frère

=== Non-Championship Formula One results ===
(key) (Races in bold indicate pole position, races in italics indicate fastest lap)

Year	Entrant	Chassis	Engine	1	2	3	4	5	6	7	8	9	10	11	12	13	14	15	16	17	18	19	20	21	22	23	24	25	26	27	28	29	30	31	32	33	34	35
1950	Alfa Romeo SpA	Alfa Romeo 158	Alfa Romeo 158 1.5 L8s	PAU	RIC	SRM	PAR	EMP	BAR	JER	ALB	NED	NAT; 3	NOT	ULS	PES	STT	INT	GOO	PEN; 3																		
1951	Scuderia Ferrari	Ferrari 500	Ferrari 500 2.0 L4	SYR	PAU	RIC	SRM	BOR	INT	PAR	ULS	SCO	NED	ALB	PES	BAR; 3	GOO																					
1952	Scuderia Ferrari	Ferrari 500	Ferrari 500 2.0 L4	RIO	SYR; 2	VAL; 2	RIC	LAV	PAU	IBS	MAR	AST	INT	ELÄ	NAP; 2	EIF	PAR; 1	ALB	FRO																			
1952	Scuderia Ferrari	Ferrari 375	Ferrari 375 4.5 V12																	**ULS**; 1	MNZ	LAC	ESS	MAR	SAB	CAE	DMT	COM	NAT	BAU	MOD	CAD	SKA	MAD	AVU	JOE	NEW	RIO

== See also ==
- Formula One drivers from Italy

Sporting positions
Preceded by Tim Hunt	500cc Motorcycle European Champion; 1932	Succeeded by Gunnar Kalén
