= Luigi Villoresi =

Italian racing driver (1909–1997)

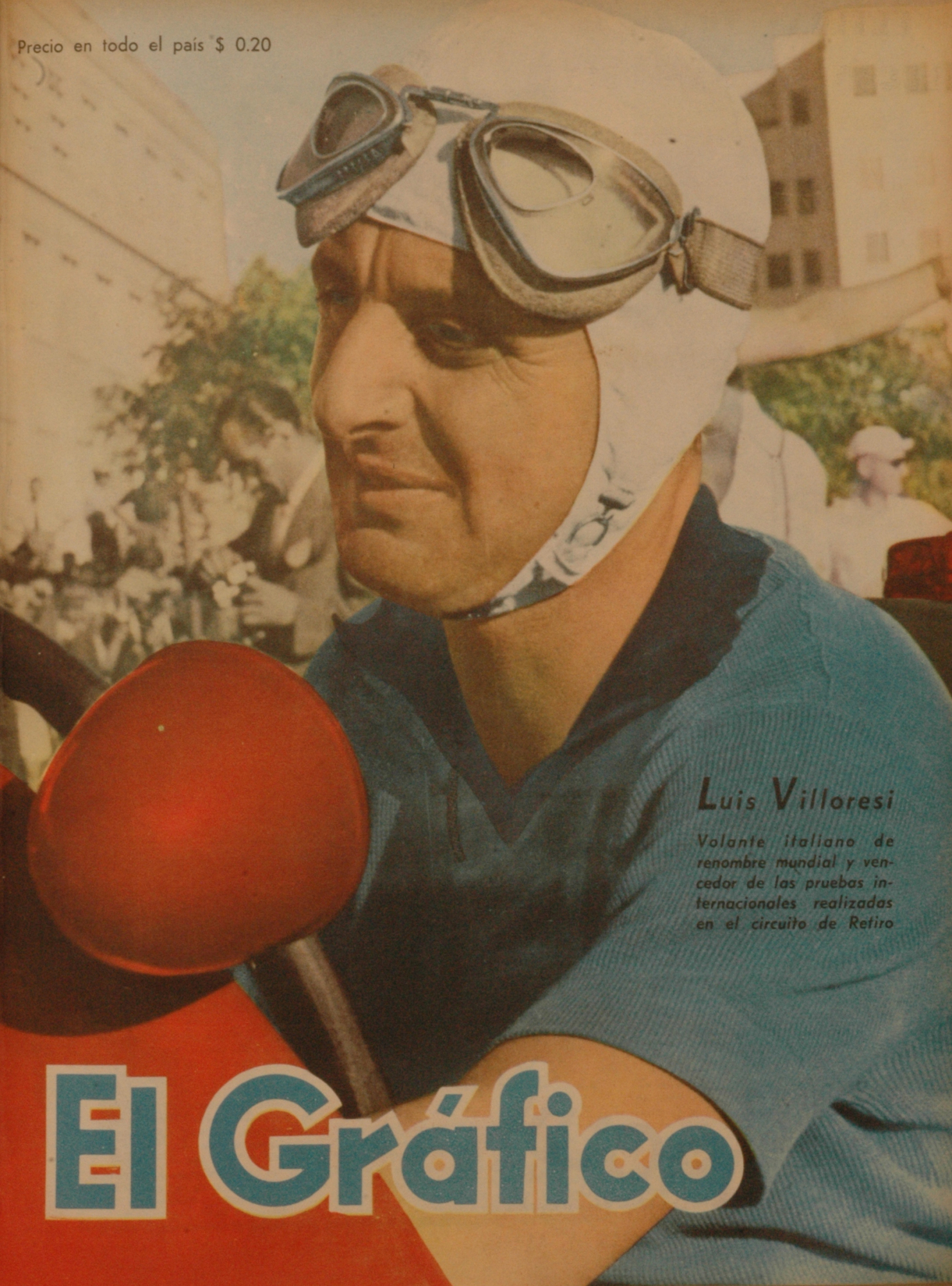
- Villoresi in 1947, on the cover of El Gráfico
- Born: 16 May 1909; Milan, Lombardy, Kingdom of Italy
- Died: 24 August 1997 (aged 88); Modena, Emilia-Romagna, Italy
- Relatives: Emilio Villoresi (brother)

Formula One World Championship career
- Nationality: (Italy) Italian
- Active years: 1950–1956
- Team(s): Ferrari, Maserati, Lancia, Centro Sud
- Entries: 34 (31 starts)
- Championships: 0
- Wins: 0
- Podiums: 8
- Career points: 46 (49) (Note: Up until 1990, not all points scored by a driver contributed to their final World Championship tally (see list of points scoring systems for more information). Numbers without parentheses are Championship points; numbers in parentheses are total points scored.)
- Pole positions: 0
- Fastest laps: 1
- First entry: 1950 Monaco Grand Prix
- Last entry: 1956 Italian Grand Prix

Luigi "Gigi" Villoresi (16 May 1909 – 24 August 1997) was an Italian racing driver, who competed in Formula One from 1950 to 1956.

Villoresi contested 34 Formula One Grands Prix across seven seasons for Italian teams Ferrari, Maserati, Lancia, and Centro Sud. He achieved eight podiums and one fastest lap, finishing fifth in the 1951 and 1953 World Drivers' Championships with Ferrari.

== Biography ==
Born in Milan, Lombardy, and nicknamed "Gigi", Villoresi was the older brother of race car driver Emilio Villoresi, and co-piloted with him in several races at the beginning of their careers. From a prosperous family, Villoresi could afford to buy a car and began competing in local rallies at the age of twenty-two with a Lancia Lambda and a few years later acquired a Fiat Balilla with which he and his brother Emilio competed in the Mille Miglia. In 1935, he raced in the Coppa Ciano, finishing third and went on to capture the Italian driving championship in the 1100cc sports car class. The following year he and his brother purchased a Maserati which they drove individually in different races. Emilio was so successful that he was signed to drive an Alfa Romeo for Scuderia Ferrari in the 1937 season.

In 1938, Villoresi became part of the Maserati team, driving the 8CTF model that Maserati had designed to compete with the dominant German Silver Arrows. In 1939, Maserati introduced the Maserati 4CL which Villoresi drove to victory at the 1939 South African Grand Prix. Unfortunately, his brother Emilio died later that year while testing an Alfa Romeo 158/159 Alfetta factory racer at the Autodromo Nazionale Monza. A little over two weeks after his brother's death, he drove his Maserati to victory at the 1939 Adriatic Grand Prix. His racing career was interrupted by the onset of World War II. At war's end, he went to America to compete in the 1946 Indianapolis 500, and afterwards he then returned to race for Maserati until 1949 when he signed again with Ferrari debuting in Formula One on 21 May 1950.

== 1949 ==
In 1949, Villoresi had major Grand Prix victories. Starting with winning the Brussels Grand Prix, then winning the Luxembourg Grand Prix on successive weekends. The next week Villoresi won the Rome Grand Prix. Villoresi won again in Garda, and took his final win in the Zandvoort Grand Prix. This amounted to a total of 5 Grand Prix victories for Villoresi in 1949.

Villoresi finished second in the 1949 Buenos Aires Grand Prix-President Juan Peron Grand Prix. Alberto Ascari was the winner with a time of 1 hour, 30 minutes, 23.9 seconds, for an average speed of 70.6 miles per hour (113.6 km/h). Villoresi won the first Grand Prix de Bruxelles, beating Alexander Orley of the United States. The winning time was 85 mph (137 km/h) over 188-mile (303 km) distance. Orley was six seconds behind. Louis Rosier was victorious in a blue Talbot, in a 500-kilometre (311 mi) Grand Prix at Spa-Francorchamps, in June 1949. He took the lead following 23 laps and came across the finish line in front of Villoresi. Villoresi was third in a 60-mile (97 km) international race at Silverstone in September 1949. Italian drivers made a clean sweep of the first three positions with Ascari first and Giuseppe Farina second as 100,000 fans looked on. English driver St. John Horsfall died when his car crashed at a turn.

== 1950–1951 ==
In 1950, Villoresi started with a win in the Buenos Aires Grand Prix in January, and then another in the Rosario Grand Prix. Following this, Villoresi also won the Marseille Grand Prix, and the Erlen Grand Prix. His season ended with a win in Monza in May, all in Ferrari 166s.

Villoresi skidded on oil, penetrated a barrier, and killed three spectators at the Grand Prix des Nations race in Geneva (Switzerland). Nino Farina impacted Villoresi's car at high speed but was uninjured. Villoresi broke his left leg and suffered head injuries which were treated at a hospital. The Grand Prix of 272 kilometres was won by Juan Manuel Fangio. The 1951 British Grand Prix was taken by José Froilán González of Argentina. Villoresi finished third, two laps behind the winner, with an average speed of 95.39 miles per hour (153.52 km/h). Villoresi completed 88 laps, two behind Gonzalez.

In 1951, Villoresi moved up to the new Ferrari 375 and won the Siracusa Grand Prix, followed by a win in the Pau Grand Prix, the Marseille Grand Prix, Genoa Grand Prix and then Senigallia Grand Prix in August.

Villoresi's most significant win in 1951 was his monumental victory in the Mille Miglia for Ferrari, marking the second time in history the brand has won the Mille Miglia.

== 1952 ==
In July 1952, Villoresi won the French Grand Prix at Les Sables d'Olonne, driving a Ferrari. He captured the three-hour, 208-mile (335 km) race, with an average speed of 69.3 miles per hour (111.5 km/h). Ferrari achieved a 1,2,3 sweep at the Grand Prix d'France in La Baule, in August 1952. Alberto Ascari was first, followed by Villoresi and Rosier. Ascari had already clinched the Formula One World Championship before this event. Villoresi drove a Ferrari to win the 1952 Grand Prix of Modena in 1:5:21 over a distance of 100 laps, 230.6-kilometre (143 mi). His average speed was 124.236 km/h (77.197 mph).

== 1953–1954 ==
Villoresi displayed his agility as a driver in the 1953 Italian Grand Prix at Monza. Giuseppe Farina made contact with the Maserati driven by Onofre Marimón as he was approaching the finish line. Villoresi made a brilliant manoeuvre while racing at 100 mph (160 km/h) The crowd came to its feet to witness his quick thinking in pulling his car off the track at great speed. Villoresi then finished third after winner Fangio and Farina, who was two seconds behind at the end. The race marked the first time a Ferrari did not win an event in races counting toward the Formula One World Championship. Fangio drove a Maserati to an average speed of 110 mph (180 km/h) over the 313-mile (504 km) Grand Prix.

Already 41 years old, Villoresi served as an elder statesman for the Formula One team, notably as Alberto Ascari's mentor who became his closest friend. In 1954, he and Ascari joined the new Lancia racing team but Ascari's death in the spring of the following year profoundly affected Villoresi and his career went into steep decline.

Villoresi was critically injured while testing a Lancia Aurelia near Rimini, Italy in April 1954. He was riding with his mechanic when he skidded while attempting to avoid a Fiat driving in the opposite direction. Both Villoresi and his mechanic were pinned beneath the Lancia. A group of farmers came to their aid, using oxen to lift the car. Both men remained conscious. Villoresi sustained a number of deep head wounds, facial lacerations, and bruises all over his body. He was listed in serious, but not critical condition.

== 1955–1958 ==
Villoresi was third after Ascari and Luigi Musso in the May 1955 Naples Grand Prix, a 153.5 miles (247.0 km) event. Villoresi was in a Lancia.

Villoresi wrecked his car in the 1956 Grand Prix of Rome, a 2-Litre sports car event. The race was won by Jean Behra in a Maserati.

Villoresi was one of nine drivers, from a starting field of 303, in a January 1958 Monte Carlo auto rally, who completed the first leg of the rigorous touring car event, without incurring a penalty. The 1,900-mile (3,060 km) endurance event featured cars from eight different European starting locales. Of the starters, 72 entrants crossed the finish line but 13 were disqualified because of lateness. The 59 who remained from the opening round faced a 655-mile (1,054 km), 22-hour portion, extending from Monte Carlo through the maritime Alps. Villoresi drove a Lancia.

Villoresi retired from Grand Prix racing in 1957 after 31 Formula One championship starts without a victory but made it to the podium eight times while scoring a total of 49 championship points. Villoresi continued rally racing and won the Acropolis Rally in Greece in 1958 before retiring to a home in Modena.

Villoresi died in 1997 at the age of 88.

== Motorsports career results ==
=== Notable victories ===
- Alsace Grand Prix 1947
- British Grand Prix 1948
- Coppa Acerbo 1938
- Coppa Edda Ciano 1938
- Dutch Grand Prix 1949
- Grand Prix d'Albigeois 1938, 1948
- Grand Prix de Bruxelles 1949
- Grand Prix du Comminges 1948
- Grand Prix de Marseilles 1950, 1951
- Gran Premio de Modena 1952
- Grand Prix de Nice 1946, 1947
- Grand Prix de Nîmes 1947
- Pau Grand Prix 1951
- Grand Prix of Naples 1948
- Gran Premio del Valentino 1952
- Interlagos Grand Prix 1949
- Lausanne Grand Prix 1947
- Mille Miglia 1951
- Penya Rhin Grand Prix 1948
- Buenos Aires Grand Prix-General Juan Perón Grand Prix 1947, 1948
- Buenos Aires Grand Prix-Eva Duarte Perón Grand Prix 1947, 1948
- Rio de Janeiro Grand Prix 1949
- Giro de Sicilia 1953
- Syracuse Grand Prix 1951
- South African Grand Prix 1939
- Targa Florio 1939, 1940
- Masaryk Circuit Grand Prix 1937
- Tripoli Grand Prix 1937
- Zandvoort Grand Prix 1949

=== FIA World Drivers' Championship results ===
(key) (Races in italics indicate fastest lap)

Year	Entrant	Chassis	Engine	1	2	3	4	5	6	7	8	9	WDC	Points
1950	Scuderia Ferrari	Ferrari 125	Ferrari V12	GBR	MON; Ret	500	SUI; Ret	BEL; 6	FRA; DNS	ITA			NC	0
1951	Scuderia Ferrari	Ferrari 375	Ferrari V12	SUI; Ret	500	BEL; 3	FRA; 3	GBR; 3	GER; 4	ITA; 4	ESP; Ret		5th	15 (18)
1952	Scuderia Ferrari	Ferrari 500	Ferrari Straight-4	SUI	500	BEL	FRA; WD	GBR	GER	NED; 3	ITA; 3		8th	8
1953	Scuderia Ferrari	Ferrari 500	Ferrari Straight-4	ARG; 2	500	NED; Ret	BEL; 2	FRA; 6	GBR; Ret	GER; 8 *	SUI; 6	ITA; 3	5th	17
1954	Officine Alfieri Maserati	Maserati 250F	Maserati Straight-6	ARG	500	BEL	FRA; 5	GBR; Ret *	GER; DNS	SUI	ITA; Ret		20th	2
1954	Scuderia Lancia	Lancia D50	Lancia V8									ESP; Ret	20th	2
1955	Scuderia Lancia	Lancia D50	Lancia V8	ARG; Ret	MON; 5	500	BEL; DNA	NED	GBR	ITA; DNS			20th	2
1956	Scuderia Centro Sud	Maserati 250F	Maserati Straight-6	ARG	MON	500	BEL; 5						22nd	2
1956	Luigi Piotti	Maserati 250F	Maserati Straight-6					FRA; Ret	GBR; 6	GER; Ret			22nd	2
1956	Officini Alfieri Maserati	Maserati 250F	Maserati Straight-6								ITA; Ret †		22nd	2

* Indicates shared drive with Alberto Ascari
† Indicates shared drive with Joakim Bonnier

=== Non-championship Formula One results ===
(key)

Year	Entrant	Chassis	Engine	1	2	3	4	5	6	7	8	9	10	11	12	13	14	15	16	17	18	19	20	21	22	23	24	25	26	27	28	29	30	31	32	33	34	35
1950	Scuderia Ferrari	Ferrari 125	Ferrari V12	PAU; 2	RIC	SRM; 2	PAR	EMP	BAR; Ret	JER	ALB; Ret	NED; 2	NAT; Ret	NOT	ULS		STT	INT	GOO	PEN; DNA																		
1950	Scuderia Ferrari	Ferrari 375	Ferrari V12													PES; DNA																						
1951	Scuderia Ferrari	Ferrari 375	Ferrari V12	SYR; 1	PAU; 1	RIC	SRM; Ret	BOR	INT; DNA	PAR	ULS	SCO	NED; DNA	ALB	PES; Ret	BAR; Ret	GOO																					
1952	Scuderia Ferrari	Ferrari 500	Ferrari Straight-4	RIO	SYR; Ret				PAU; Ret	IBS	MAR; Ret	AST	INT; DNA	ELÄ	NAP	EIF	PAR; DSQ†	ALB	FRO	ULS	MNZ; Ret	LAC	ESS	MAR; 3*	SAB; 1	CAE		COM; ALT	NAT	BAU; 2	MOD; 1	CAD	SKA	MAD	AVU	JOE	NEW	RIO
1952	Scuderia Ferrari	Ferrari 375	Ferrari V12			VAL; 1	RIC	LAV																			DAI; 1											
1953	Scuderia Ferrari	Ferrari 500	Ferrari Straight-4	SYR; Ret	PAU	LAV	AST	BOR; 2	INT	ELÄ	NAP; 4	ULS	WIN	FRO	COR	EIF	ALB	PRI	ESS	MID	ROU	CRY	AVU	USF	LAC	BRI	CHE	SAB	NEW	CAD	RED	SKA	LON	MOD	MAD	JOE	CUR	
1955	Scuderia Lancia	Lancia D50	Lancia V8	BUE	VAL; 3	PAU; 4	GLO	BOR	INT	NAP; 3	ALB	CUR	COR	LON	DAR	RED	DAT	OUT	AVO	SYR; 3																		
1956	Luigi Villoresi	Maserati 250F	Maserati Straight-6	BUE	GLO	SYR; 4	BAR	INT	NAP; Ret	AIN	VAN	CAE	BRS																									

* Indicates shared drive with Alberto Ascari
† Indicates shared drive with Giuseppe Farina

== Indianapolis 500 results ==
Year	Car	Start	Qual	Rank	Finish	Laps	Led	Retired
1946	52	28	121.249	18	7	200	0	Running
Totals						200	0	

Starts	1
Poles	0
Front Row	0
Wins	0
Top 5	0
Top 10	1
Retired	0
