= Johnny Claes =

English jazz trumpeter and racing driver (1916–1956)

- Johnny Claes during the 1950 British GP in Silverstone
- Born: Octave John Claes; 11 August 1916; Fulham, London, England
- Died: 3 February 1956 (aged 39); Brussels, Belgium

Formula One World Championship career
- Nationality: (Belgium) Belgian
- Active years: 1950 – 1953, 1955
- Team(s): Écurie Belge, Gordini, HWM, Maserati, Ecurie Nationale Belge
- Entries: 25 (23 starts)
- Championships: 0
- Wins: 0
- Podiums: 0
- Career points: 0
- Pole positions: 0
- Fastest laps: 0
- First entry: 1950 British Grand Prix
- Last entry: 1955 Dutch Grand Prix

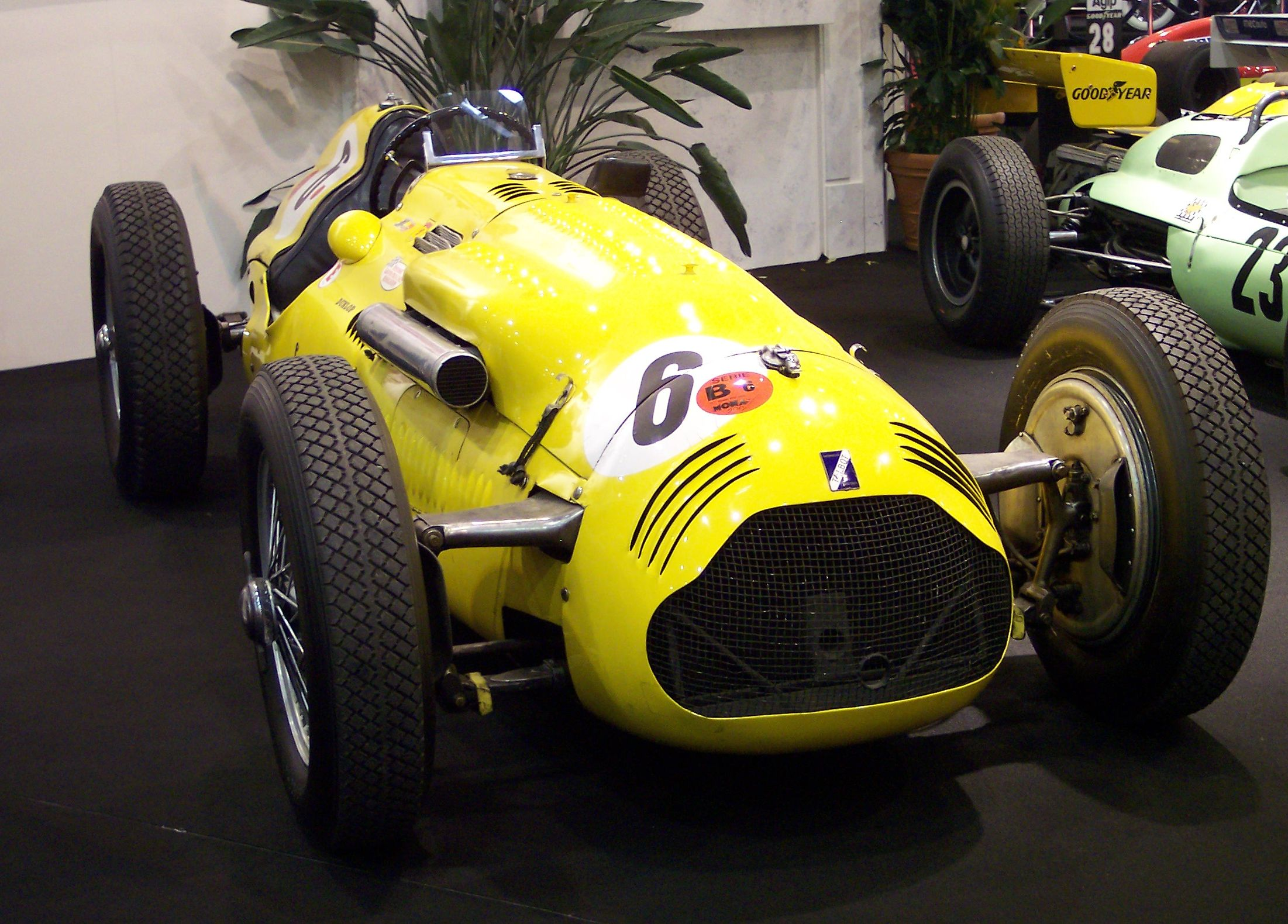
Claes's Talbot Lago T26C, Ecurie Belge 1950

Octave John Claes (/kleɪz/; 11 August 1916 – 3 February 1956) was a British-born racing driver who competed for Belgium. Before his fame as a racing driver, Claes was also a jazz trumpeter and successful bandleader in Britain.

== Early life and jazz career ==
Claes was born in London to a Scottish mother and Belgian father. He was educated in England at Lord Williams's School. In England, he began playing trumpet in a jazz band that included Max Jones on reeds, and another with Billy Mason on piano. In the 1930s, he moved to the Netherlands, where he worked with Valaida Snow and Coleman Hawkins. He also worked with Jack Kluger's band in Belgium. Returning to England, he led his own group, the Claepigeons, making a recording in 1942. In the late 1940s, he abandoned his jazz career and settled in Belgium as a professional racing driver.

== Racing career ==
Claes was one of several gentlemen drivers who took part in Grand Prix racing of post-World War II. His first contact with racing was at the 1947 French Grand Prix, where he served as interpreter for British drivers. He made his debut in 1948, in his own Talbot-Lago, raced under the Écurie Belge banner. Although Claes never scored any points in the World Drivers Championship, he was, like many of his contemporaries, very active in non-Championship Grand Prix races and sports car races. His first win was at the 1950 Grand Prix des Frontières, held at the Chimay race track.

In April 1951, Claes crashed into a crowd while practicing at San Remo Grand Prix in Sanremo, Italy. He was uninjured but an observer was killed and three onlookers were seriously injured. In 1952 he exchanged his outdated Talbot for a Gordini, and later for a Connaught, always with the Écurie Belge colours, but he also raced occasionally for works teams, including Gordini and Maserati. He also won the 1953 Liège–Rome–Liège Rally and took a class win at the 1954 24 Hours of Le Mans. Claes teamed with Pierre Stasse to finish 12th in the 1954 24 Hours of Le Mans. They drove a Porsche. Together with compatriot Jacques Swaters, Claes finished third in the 1955 24 Hours of Le Mans.

Later in 1955, Claes's health problems worsened, as he had contracted tuberculosis. Claes sold his outfit to Swaters, who merged it with his own Écurie Francorchamps to form Écurie Nationale Belge. Claes entered occasional events until the end of the year, but finally succumbed to the disease in Brussels in 1956, aged 39.

== Complete Formula One World Championship results ==
(key)

Year	Entrant	Chassis	Engine	1	2	3	4	5	6	7	8	9	WDC	Pts.
1950	Écurie Belge	Talbot-Lago T26C	Talbot L6	GBR; 11	MON; 7	500	SUI; 10	BEL; 8	FRA; Ret	ITA; Ret			NC	0
1951	Écurie Belge	Talbot-Lago T26C-DA	Talbot L6	SUI; 13	500	BEL; 7	FRA; Ret	GBR; 13	GER; 11	ITA; Ret	ESP; Ret		NC	0
1952	Équipe Gordini	Gordini T16	Gordini L6	SUI	500	BEL; 8							NC	0
1952	Écurie Belge	Simca-Gordini T15	Simca-Gordini L4				FRA; Ret	GBR; 14					NC	0
1952	HW Motors	HWM 52	Alta L4						GER; 10	NED			NC	0
1952	Vicomtesse de Walckiers	Simca-Gordini T15	Simca-Gordini L4								ITA; DNQ		NC	0
1953	Écurie Belge	Connaught Type A	Lea-Francis L4	ARG	500	NED; Ret		FRA; 12	GBR	GER; Ret	SUI	ITA; Ret	NC	0
1953	Officine Alfieri Maserati	Maserati A6GCM	Maserati L6				BEL; Ret						NC	0
1955	Stirling Moss Ltd.	Maserati 250F	Maserati L6	ARG	MON	500	BEL; DNS						NC	0
1955	Écurie Nationale Belge	Ferrari 500	Ferrari L4					NED; 11	GBR	ITA			NC	0

=== Non-championship Formula One results ===
(key)

Year	Entrant	Chassis	Engine	1	2	3	4	5	6	7	8	9	10	11	12	13	14	15	16	17	18	19	20	21	22	23	24	25	26	27	28	29	30	31	32	33	34	35
1950	Johnny Claes	Talbot-Lago T26C	Talbot L6	PAU	RIC	SRM	PAR; DNA	EMP	BAR; 8	JER	ALB; NC	NED; Ret	NAT; Ret	NOT	ULS	PES	STT	INT; Ret	GOO; Ret	PEN; Ret																		
1951	Johnny Claes	Talbot-Lago T26C-DA	Talbot L6	SYR	PAU	RIC; 4	SRM; DNS	BOR	INT; 8	PAR	ULS; 9	SCO	NED; Ret	ALB; 5	PES	BAR; 8	GOO																					
1952	Johnny Claes	Talbot-Lago T26C-DA	Talbot L6	RIO	SYR	VAL; 6	RIC	LAV	PAU; Ret	IBS										ULS; DNA																		
1952	Johnny Claes	Simca-Gordini T15	Simca-Gordini L4								MAR; 3	AST	INT; 8	ELÄ	NAP	EIF; DNA	PAR; Ret	ALB	FRO; Ret					MAR; 6	SAB; 3	CAE	DAI	COM; Ret	NAT	BAU; 8	MOD; NC	CAD	SKA	MAD	AVU	JOE	NEW; Ret	RIO
1952	Johnny Claes	HWM 52	Alta L4																		MNZ; NC	LAC	ESS															
1953	Johny Claes	Connaught Type A	Lea-Francis L4	SYR	PAU; Ret	LAV	AST	BOR; 6	INT; 15	ELÄ	NAP	ULS	WIN	FRO; NC	COR	EIF	ALB; 6	PRI	ESS	MID	ROU; Ret	CRY	AVU; 6	USF	LAC	BRI	CHE	SAB; Ret	NEW	CAD	RED	SKA	LON	MOD; NC	MAD	JOE	CUR	
