= Birabongse Bhanudej =

Prince of Siam (1914–1985)

Prince Bira of Siam; พีรพงศ์ภาณุเดช
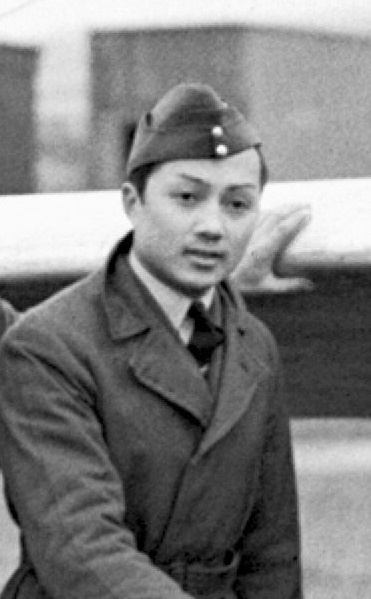
- Bira in 1944
- Born: Mom Chao Birabongse Bhanudej Bhanubandh; 15 July 1914; Grand Palace, Bangkok, Siam
- Died: 23 December 1985 (aged 71); London, England
- Spouse: Ceril Heycock (1938–1949); Celia "Chelita" Howard (1951–1956); Salika Kalantananda (1957); Arunee Chuladakoson (1959–1964); Chuanchom Chaiyananda (1967–1980)
- Issue: Biradej Bhanubandh; Rabibara Bhanubandh; Biranubongse Bhanubandh
Names
- Thai: พีรพงศ์ภาณุเดช
- House: Bhanubandh (Chakri dynasty)
- Father: Prince Bhanubandhubongse Voradej
- Mother: Mom Lek Bhanubandh na Ayudhya (née Yongchaiyudh)

Formula One World Championship career
- Nationality: (Thailand) Thai
- Active years: 1950–1954
- Team(s): Platé, privateer Maserati, Gordini, Connaught, Milano, Maserati
- Entries: 22 (19 starts)
- Championships: 0
- Wins: 0
- Podiums: 0
- Career points: 8
- Pole positions: 0
- Fastest laps: 0
- First entry: 1950 British Grand Prix
- Last entry: 1954 Spanish Grand Prix

24 Hours of Le Mans career
- Years: 1939, 1954
- Teams: Alfa Romeo, Aston Martin
- Best finish: DNF (1939, 1954)
- Class wins: 0

Prince Birabongse Bhanudej Bhanubandh (Note: His full title was His Highness, Prince Birabongse Bhanudej from 1927 until his death, and was previously His Serene Highness, Prince Birabongse Bhanudej Bhanubandh.) (Thai: พีรพงศ์ภาณุเดช; RTGS: Phiraphong Phanudet; 15 July 1914 – 23 December 1985), commonly known as Prince Bira of Siam or simply Prince Bira, (Note: Bira also competed in Formula One under the pseudonym B. Bira.) was a member of the Thai royal family. Bira was also a racing driver, sailor and pilot, who competed in Formula One from 1950 to 1954 and at four editions of the Summer Olympics between 1956 and 1972.

A member of the Chakri dynasty, Bira studied at Eton College before he began competing in Grand Prix motor racing in 1935, later advancing to Formula One for its inaugural 1950 season. He competed for several teams including Platé, Gordini, Connaught, Milano and Maserati, amongst other privateer entries in Maserati machinery. Across five seasons and 19 Grands Prix, Bira scored several points finishes, including fourth-placed finishes at the 1950 Swiss Grand Prix and the 1954 French Grand Prix, amongst two non-championship race victories. He remained the only Southeast Asian to compete in Formula One until Malaysian driver Alex Yoong in 2001, and the only Thai driver until Alexander Albon in 2019. Outside of Formula One, Bira won the New Zealand Grand Prix in 1955, driving the Maserati 250F.

Bira also competed in sailing events at four Summer Olympic Games and was an amateur pilot, undertaking several long-distance flights in light aircraft and gliders; in 1952 he flew from London to Bangkok in his own twin-engine Miles Gemini. During the Second World War, when motor racing was suspended, he applied his aviation skills to the training of Royal Air Force (RAF) fighter pilots, later serving as chief instructor at the St Merryn Royal Naval Air Station with a specialisation in glider-pilot instruction.

Bira is credited with establishing the racing colours of Thailand: pale blue and yellow. Upon his death in December 1985, the Bira Circuit was built in his honour, becoming the first motor racing circuit in Thailand to meet FIA standards.

== Early life ==
Bira's parents were Prince Bhanurangsi Savangwongse and his second wife. Bira's paternal grandfather was King Mongkut, loosely portrayed in the Hollywood movies The King and I and Anna and the King. His mother died when Bira was only four years old. Bira was sent to Europe in 1927 to complete his education in England at Eton College, where he joined one of his nephews, a grandchild of his father through his first marriage. While he was at Eton Bira's father died, leaving him an orphan. He was placed under the care of his cousin, Prince Chula Chakrabongse, who ultimately became Bira's legal guardian. On leaving Eton at age 18, in early 1933, Bira moved in with Prince Chula in London, while he decided on his future.

Bira had been registered to attend Trinity College, Cambridge, but had not passed the Cambridge University entrance examination. Initially, Prince Chula hired a tutor for Bira, to better prepare him for the exam, but Bira changed his mind and expressed a desire to learn sculpture rather than attend university. Prince Chula approached leading sculptor Charles Wheeler, and Wheeler took Bira on as a pupil within his studio. Although Bira showed some talent as a sculptor, in Wheeler's opinion he needed to learn to draw, and so in the autumn of 1934 Bira enrolled at the Byam Shaw School of Art. Bira did not attend the Byam Shaw School for very long, but while there he became friendly with a fellow student, Ceril Heycock, and he began courting her in earnest only a few weeks later. However, both Prince Chula and her parents placed severe limitations on their relationship, and it was not until 1938 that they were able to marry.

== Auto racing ==
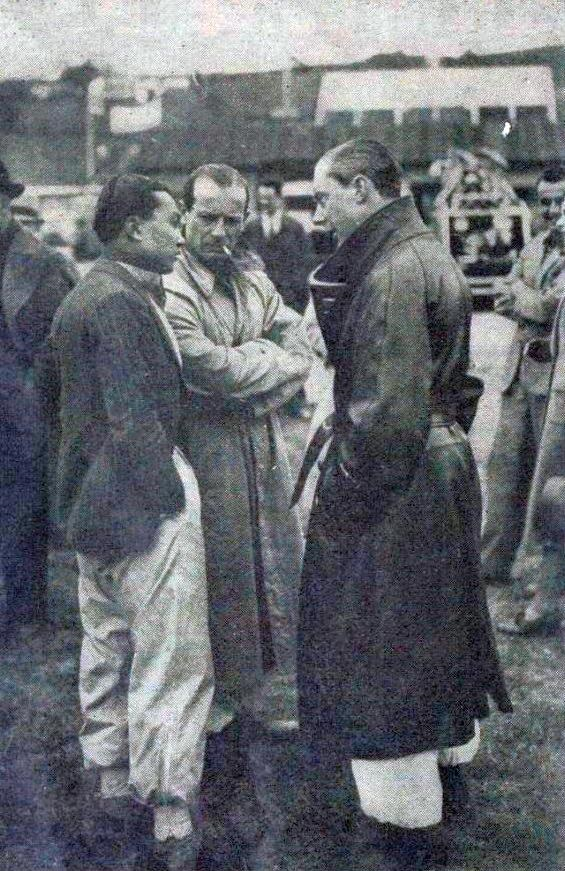
Bira with Franco Comotti and René Dreyfus at the 1938 Cork Grand Prix

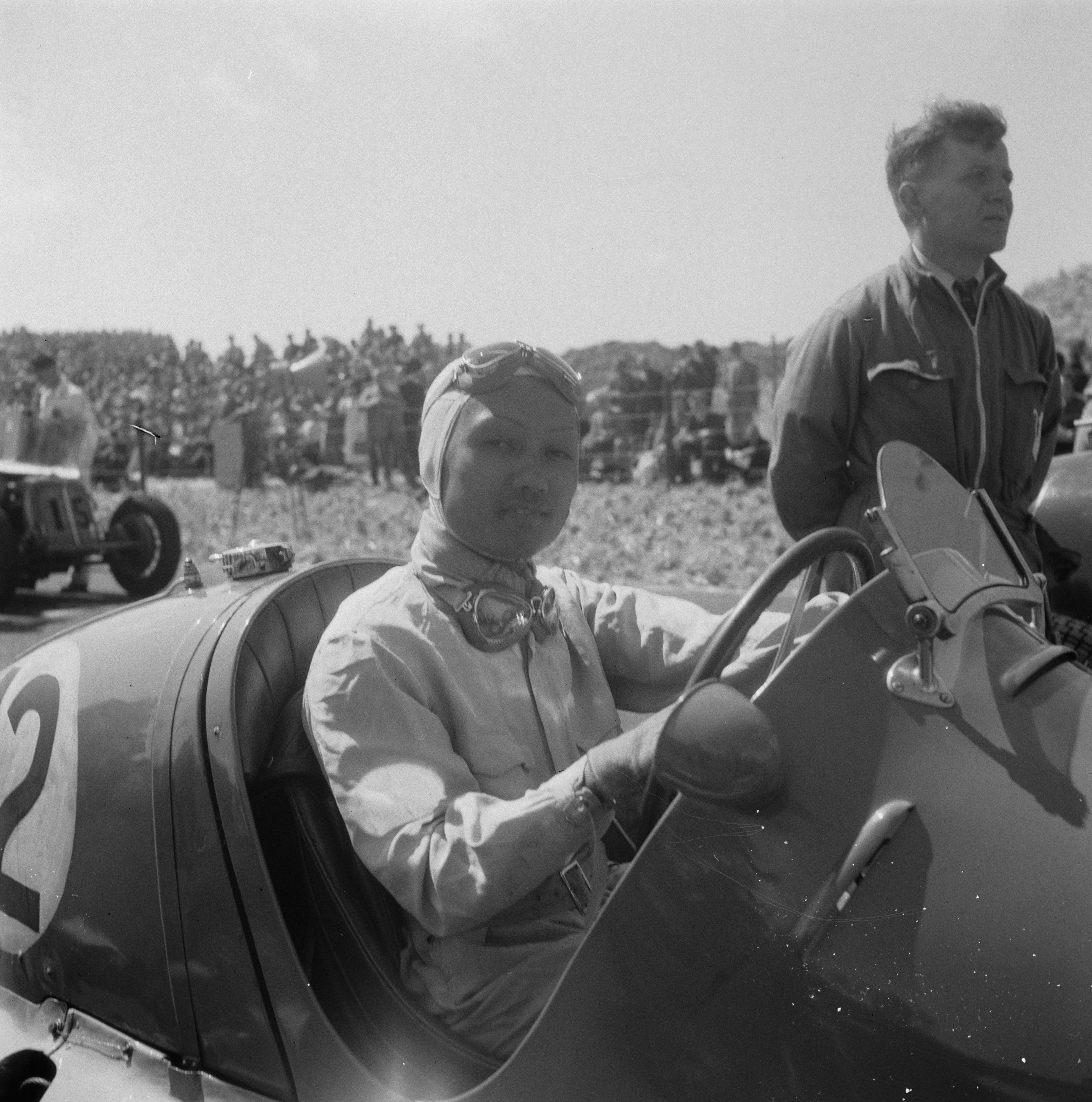
Bira at Zandvoort in 1948, a race which he ended up winning.

Bira first raced with his cousin Prince Chula's team, White Mouse Racing, driving a Riley Imp at Brooklands in 1935. In this car Bira established the national motor racing colours of Siam: pale blue with yellow. He raced under the name 'B Bira'. He later lived near Geneva, Switzerland, and in the south of France.

Later in 1935, Prince Chula gave him one of the new ERA voiturette racing cars—R2B, which was nicknamed Romulus. Bira finished second in his first ever race in Romulus, despite needing to stop for repairs. The remaining races of the season saw Bira consistently placing among the more powerful Grand Prix vehicles, with another second place, and fifth at the Donington Grand Prix.

For 1936, the princes decided that the previous season's results merited a second ERA. They purchased chassis R5B (which Bira named Remus) to use in British events and retained Romulus for international races. Chula also purchased a Maserati 8CM to complete the White Mouse roster. Bira's expertise behind the wheel earned him the Coupe de Prince Rainier at Monte Carlo. Bira won a further four races in the ERAs that season, and took the Grand Prix Maserati to fifth at Donington and third at Brooklands. This was the high point for Bira and the White Mouse team.

Following Dick Seaman's move to Mercedes for 1937, the Thais purchased his Grand Prix Delage and all of its spare parts, along with a second Delage. Despite several upgrades, and hiring experienced race engineer and future Jaguar team manager Lofty England, the cars underperformed, and on many occasions Bira raced in the older and by now substantially inferior ERAs. In addition, the money spent on the Delage upgrades had sapped the resources of the team and corners were being cut in the ERA's race preparations. Later in the year White Mouse did invest in a newer C-Type ERA, chassis R12C. R12C came to be known as Hanuman, and Bira attached a large, embossed, silver badge depicting the Hindu deity after whom he had named the car. Following a major accident in 1939 Hanuman was rebuilt back to B-Type specifications, and in light of this major overhaul Bira renamed the car Hanuman II.

While Bira maintained a respectable results tally in British events, the more costly international races were largely a disaster.

After the war, Bira returned to racing with several teams. He took part in the inaugural World Drivers' Championship in 1950 racing a supercharged Maserati 4CLT/48, starting four Championship races including the first, at Silverstone, where he was obliged to retire from the race with a fuel feed problem, but finished fifth at Monaco and fourth at Bremgarten the same season, giving him five points and finishing eighth in the Championship. 1950 was his best season; Bira took part in each Championship season until 1954, starting a total of 19 races, but only scored points in one more race - a fourth place at Reims in 1954 provided three points and seventeenth place in the Championship. In 1951, he raced in an old Maserati 4CLT fitted with a newer V12 Osca engine. No results were obtained this year as a result of the poor performance of the car combined with a severe accident. By 1954, with a newer car, a Maserati 250F, he won the Grand Prix des Frontières on the Chimay road circuit and then finished fourth in the 1954 French Grand Prix with his own Maserati. In January 1955, he won the New Zealand Grand Prix at Ardmore; he retired at the end of that season.

Bira returned to racing for the one-off Macau Grand Prix Race of Giants in 1978, finishing 13th.

== Training RAF pilots during World War II ==
F1 drivers are sometimes referred to as "pilots," a description that also applied to Bira, who had a strong interest in aviation, he undertook several long-distance journeys in light aircraft and gliders, and in 1952 flew from London to Bangkok in his own twin-engine Miles Gemini. During World War II, when motor racing was suspended, Bira applied his skills to training fighter pilots for Britain's Royal Air Force. He eventually became chief instructor at the St Merryn Royal Naval Air Station, specialising in glider-pilot instruction.

== Sailing ==
Bira competed in sailing events at the 1956 Melbourne Olympics in the Star, 1960 Rome Olympics in the Star, 1964 Tokyo Olympics in the Dragon and the 1972 Munich Olympics in the Tempest. In the 1960 Games he competed against another former Formula One driver, Roberto Mieres, who finished seventeenth, ahead of the prince at nineteenth.

== Death ==
Bira died at Barons Court tube station in London on 23 December 1985. He collapsed and died having suffered a major heart attack, but as he carried no identification with him, his body could not initially be identified. A handwritten note was found in his pocket by the Metropolitan Police and was sent for analysis at the University of London, where it was shown as being written in Thai and addressed to Bira. The Thai Embassy was notified, and realised his significance. A Thai funeral service was held at the Wat Buddhapadipa in Wimbledon, and he was later cremated according to Thai and Buddhist tradition and customs.

== Other honors ==
Bira Circuit, based just outside Pattaya, Thailand, is named after Bira.

In 2016, in an academic paper that reported a mathematical modeling study that assessed the relative influence of driver and machine, Bira was ranked the forty-third best Formula One driver of all time.

== Development of the Thai racing colours ==
Bira was instrumental in developing and setting the national racing colours of Thailand. The base colour for the scheme, a mid to pale powder blue, was adopted by Bira in 1934, and was derived from the evening dress of a young woman that Bira met during his early years in London. Initially the cars were painted solely in blue, but gradually Bira added in some yellow to offset the base colour. He started painting the cars' chassis rails yellow in 1939.

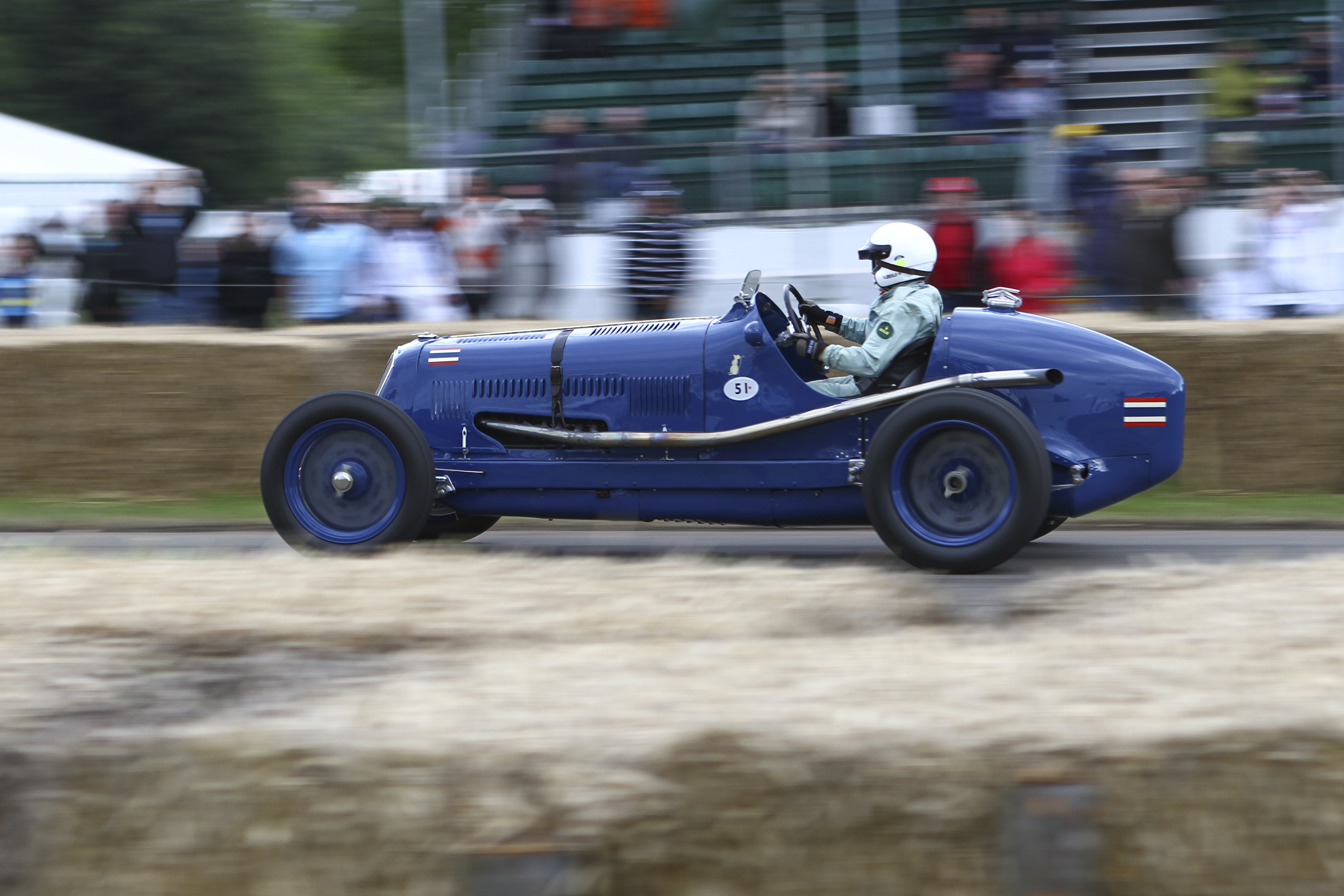
Bira's 1936 Maserati 8CM, seen in his original all blue livery with Siamese flags on the tail and the White Mouse emblem just ahead of the cockpit

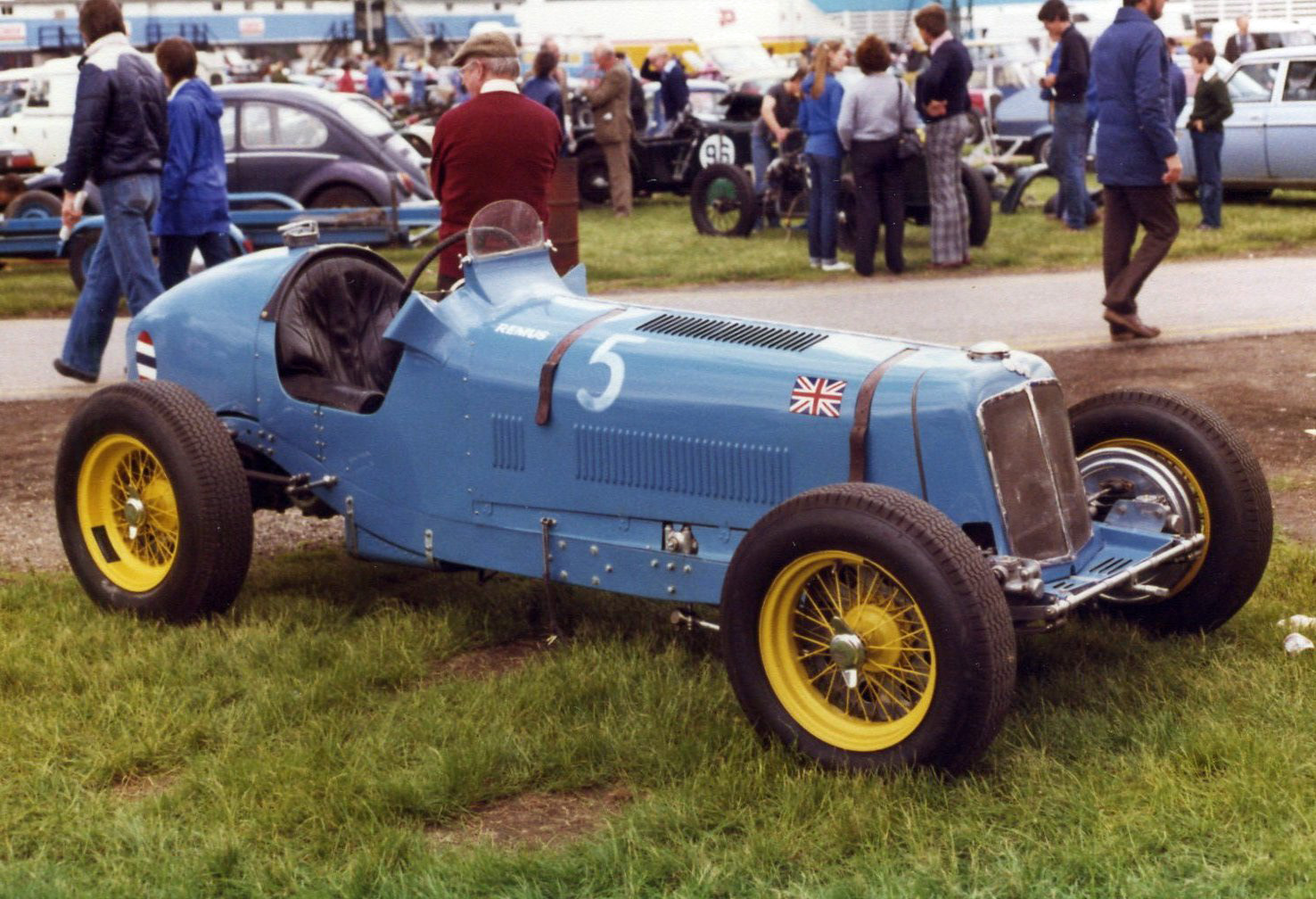
Bira's second ERA racing car, R5B Remus, in an intermediate livery of blue with yellow wheels only. The UK flag is placed in the position of honour, at the right leading edge of the car's bonnet, to represent its manufacturer

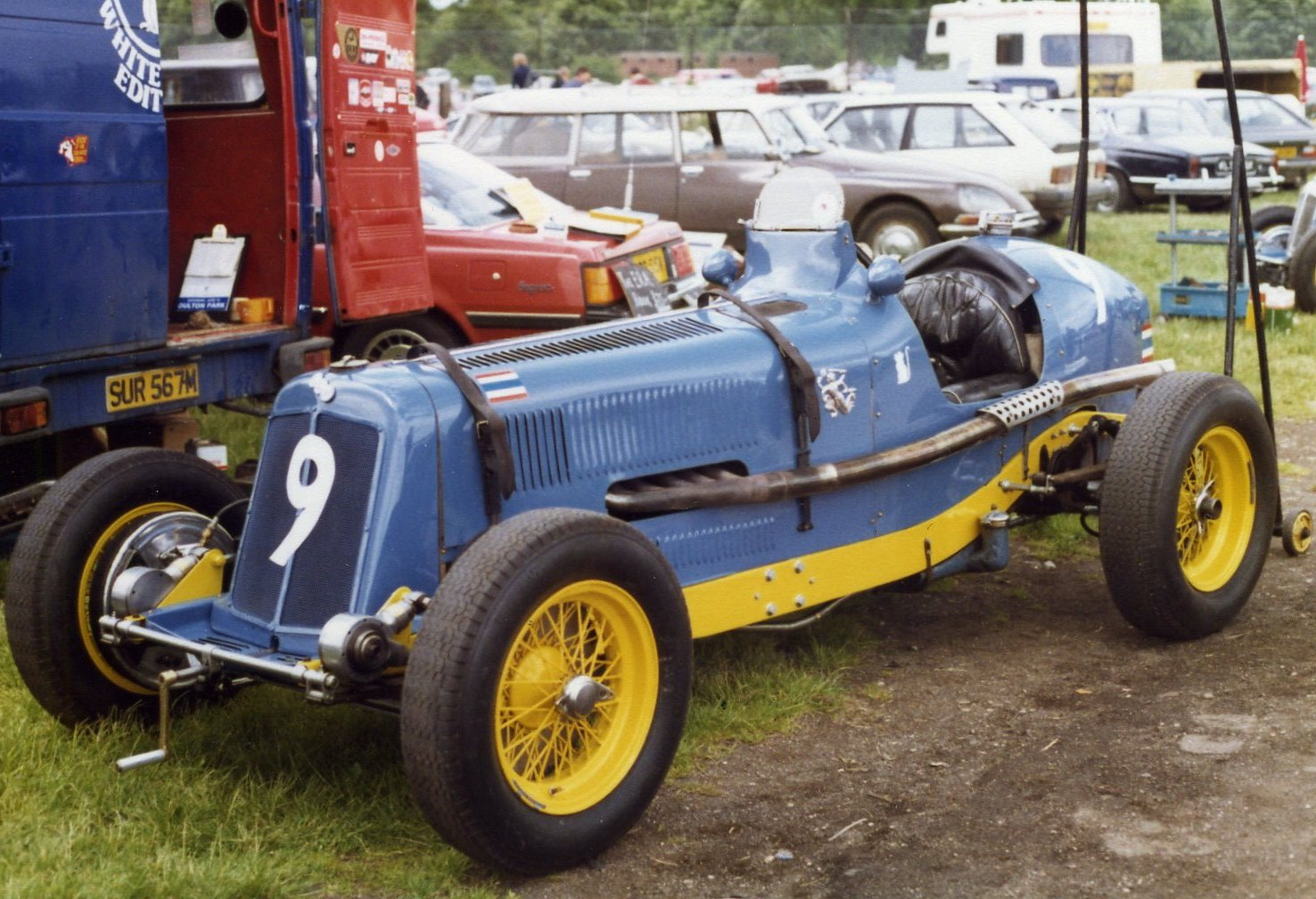
Bira's third ERA, chassis R12B Hanuman II, in the final Thai racing scheme of pale blue with yellow chassis rails and wheels. The Thai flag is placed in the subsidiary position, at the left leading edge of the car's bonnet, to represent the driver (it is also on the tail)

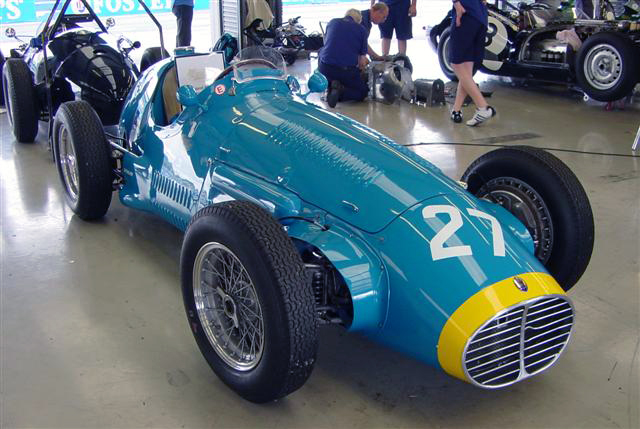
Bira's 1954 Maserati A6GCM Inter in a looser interpretation of his racing colours. Post-WWII, and particularly outside Grand Épreuve events, national racing colour schemes were not strictly enforced

Bira driving his 1954 Maserati 250F in the 1954 French Grand Prix. The adaptations to the official racing scheme needed for post-WWII cars that lacked visible chassis rails are clearly seen: the yellow now forms a broad band around the lower part of the car's bodywork

== Racing record ==
=== Career highlights ===
Season	Series	Position	Team	Car
1936	I Prince Rainier Cup	1st	B. Bira	ERA R2B
1936	XII Picardy Grand Prix	1st	B. Bira	ERA R2B
1936	IV Albi Grand Prix	1st	B. Bira	ERA R2B
1937	I Campbell Trophy	1st	B. Bira	Maserati 8CM
1937	London Grand Prix	1st	B. Bira	ERA R2B
1938	II Campbell Trophy	1st		ERA R2B
1938	Cork Grand Prix	2nd	Prince Chula of Siam	Maserati 8CM
1939	III Campbell Trophy	2nd		ERA R2B
1946	I Ulster Trophy	1st		Maserati 4CL
1947	XVII Grand Prix des Frontières	1st		Maserati 4CL
1948	Stockholm Grand Prix	1st	Equipe Gordini	Simca-Gordini T15
1948	I Zandvoort Grand Prix	1st		Maserati 4CLT-48
1949	IV Roussillon Grand Prix	2nd	Prince Bira	Maserati 4CLT-48
1949	IV San Remo Grand Prix	2nd	Scuderia Ambrosiana	Maserati 4CLT-48
1949	II Mar del Plata Grand Prix	2nd	White Motorsports	Maserati 4CLT-48
1949	VI French Grand Prix	2nd	Enrico Platé	Maserati 4CLT-48
1949	XI Albi Grand Prix	2nd	Enrico Platé	Maserati 4CLT-48
1949	XIX Italian Grand Prix (Note: The XIX Italian Grand Prix in 1949 was also held as the X European Grand Prix.)	3rd	Enrico Platé	Maserati 4CLT-48
1950	III Goodwood Trophy	2nd	Enrico Platé	Maserati 4CLT-48
1950	RAC Woodcote Trophy	2nd	Enrico Platé	Maserati 4CLT-48
1950	FIA Formula One World Championship	8th	Enrico Platé	Maserati 4CLT-48
1951	III Richmond Trophy	1st	Ecurie Siam	Maserati 4CLT-48
1952	XII Marseille Grand Prix	2nd	Equipe Gordini	Simca-Gordini T15
1954	XXIV Grand Prix des Frontières	1st	Prince Bira	Maserati A6GCM
1954	Rouen Grand Prix	2nd	Prince Bira	Maserati 250F
1954	XXIII Pescara Grand Prix	2nd	Prince Bira	Maserati 250F
1954	FIA Formula One World Championship	17th	Prince Bira	Maserati 250F
1955	III New Zealand Grand Prix	1st	Prince Bira	Maserati 250F
1955	VII BRDC International Trophy	3rd	Prince Bira	Maserati 250F

=== Complete European Championship results ===
(key) (Races in bold indicate pole position) (Races in italics indicate fastest lap)

Year	Entrant	Chassis	Engine	1	2	3	4	EDC	Pts
1938	Squadra Sabauda	Maserati 8CM	Maserati 3.0 L8	FRA	GER	SUI; 14^{1}	ITA	— (Note: As a co-driver, Bira was ineligible for championship points.)	

=== Post-World War II Grandes Épreuves results ===
(key) (Races in bold indicate pole position; races in italics indicate fastest lap)

Year	Entrant	Chassis	Engine	1	2	3	4	5
1947	Enrico Platé	Maserati 4CL	Maserati 4CL 1.5 L4 s	SUI; 8				
1947	Ecurie Souris Blanche	ERA B	ERA 1.5 L6 s		BEL; DNS			
1947	Scuderia Milano	Maserati 4CL	Maserati 4CL 1.5 L4 s			ITA; Ret	FRA	
1948	Equipe Gordini	Simca Gordini T15	Simca-Gordini 15C 1.5 L4 s	MON; Ret				
1948	Enrico Platé	Maserati 4CL	Maserati 4CL 1.5 L4 s		SUI; Ret			
1948	Prince Chula	ERA B	ERA 1.5 L6 s			FRA; DNS		
1948	Scuderia Ferrari	Ferrari 125	Ferrari 125 F1 1.5 V12 s				ITA; Ret	
1949	Prince Chula	Maserati 4CLT/48	Maserati 4CLT 1.5 L4 s	GBR; Ret	BEL			
1949	Enrico Platé	Maserati 4CLT/48	Maserati 4CLT 1.5 L4 s			SUI; 5	FRA; 2	ITA; 3

=== Complete Formula One World Championship results ===
(key)

Year	Entrant	Chassis	Engine	1	2	3	4	5	6	7	8	9	WDC	Pts
1950	Enrico Platé	Maserati 4CLT/48	Maserati 4CLT 1.5 L4 s	GBR; Ret	MON; 5	500	SUI; 4	BEL	FRA	ITA; Ret			8th	5
1951	Ecurie Siam	Maserati 4CLT/48	Maserati 4CLT 1.5 L4 s	SUI	500	BEL	FRA; DNA	GBR	GER; DNA	ITA			NC	0
1951	Ecurie Siam	Maserati 4CLT/48	OSCA 4500 4.5 V12								ESP; Ret		NC	0
1952	Equipe Gordini	Gordini T15	Gordini 1500 1.5 L4	SUI; Ret	500	BEL; 10							NC	0
1952	Equipe Gordini	Gordini T16	Gordini 20 2.0 L6				FRA; Ret	GBR; 11	GER	NED	ITA		NC	0
1953	Connaught Engineering	Connaught Type A	Lea-Francis 2.0 L4	ARG	500	NED	BEL	FRA; Ret	GBR; 7	GER; Ret	SUI		NC	0
1953	Scuderia Milano	Maserati A6GCM	Maserati A6 2.0 L6									ITA; 11	NC	0
1954	Officine Alfieri Maserati	Maserati A6GCM	Maserati A6 2.0 L6	ARG; 7	500								17th	3
1954	Prince Bira	Maserati 250F	Maserati 250F1 2.5 L6			BEL; 6	FRA; 4	GBR; Ret	GER; Ret	SUI	ITA	ESP; 9	17th	3
1955	Prince Bira	Maserati 250F	Maserati 250F1 2.5 L6	ARG	MON	500	BEL; DNA	NED	GBR	ITA			NC	0

=== Complete non-championship Formula One results ===
(key) (Races in bold indicate pole position; races in italics indicate fastest lap)

Year	Entrant	Chassis	Engine	1	2	3	4	5	6	7	8	9	10	11	12	13	14	15	16	17	18	19	20	21	22	23	24	25	26	27	28	29	30	31	32	33	34	35	36
1950	Enrico Platé	Maserati 4CLT/48	Maserati 4CLT 1.5 L4 s	PAU	RIC; Ret	SRM; Ret	PAR	EMP; Ret	BAR; Ret	JER; Ret	ALB; Ret	NED; 5	NAT; Ret	NOT	ULS	PES; Ret	STT	INT	GOO; 2	PEN; Ret																			
1951	Enrico Platé	Maserati 4CLT/48	Maserati 4CLT 1.5 L4 s	SYR; Ret	PAU																																		
1951	Ecurie Siam	Maserati 4CLT/48	OSCA 4500 4.5 V12			RIC; 1	SRM; Ret	BOR; 4	INT; 17	PAR	ULS	SCO	NED	ALB	PES	BAR	GOO																						
1952	Equipe Gordini	Gordini T15	Gordini 1500 1.5 L4	RIO	SYR	VAL	AUS	RIC	LAV	PAU	IBS	MAR; 2	AST	INT; 6	ELA	NAP	EIF	PAR; Ret	AGP; NC	FRO			LAC; 5	WEC		SAB; 4	CEA	DMT	COM	NAT	BAU	MOD	CAD	SKA	MAD	AVU	JOE	NEW	RIO
1952	B Bira	Maserati 4CLT/48	OSCA 4500 4.5 V12																		ULS; Ret	MNZ																	
1952	Equipe Gordini	Gordini T16	Gordini 20 2.0 L6																						MAR; 4														
1953	Ecurie Siam	Maserati A6GCM	Maserati A6 2.0 L6	SYR	PAU	LAV	AST	INT; 4	ELA	NAP	ULS	WIN	COR	FRO; Ret	SNE	EIF; 11	AGP	COU	WEC	MID	ROU	CRY	AVU; Ret	USA	LAC	BRI	MCM	SAB	NEW	CAD	RED	SKA	LON	MOD	MAD	JOE	CUR		
1954	Officine Alfieri Maserati	Maserati A6GCM	Maserati Straight-6	RIO	NZM	BUE; 7	SYR	PAU	LAV																														
1954	Prince Bira	Maserati 250F	Maserati 250F1 2.5 L6							BOR; Ret	INT; Ret	BAR; 6	CUR	ROM	FRO; 1	COM	BAF	CRY	ROU; 2	CAE; 4	AUG	COM	OUL	RED	PES; 2	JOE	CAD	GBE	GOO	DAI									
1955	Prince Bira	Maserati 250F	Maserati 250F1 2.5 L6	VAL; 8	PAU	GLO	BOR; 6	INT; 3	NAP	ALB	CUR	COR	LON	DAR	RED	DAT	OUT	AVO	SYR																				

=== Complete 24 Hours of Le Mans results ===
Year	Team	Co-Drivers	Car	Class	Laps	Pos.	Class Pos.
1939	(France) Raymond Sommer	(France) Raymond Sommer	Alfa Romeo 6C 2500SS	3.0	173	DNF	DNF
1954	(United Kingdom) Aston Martin Lagonda	(United Kingdom) Peter Collins	Aston Martin DB3S Coupé	S 3.0	138	DNF	DNF

== Ancestry ==
Ancestors of Birabongse Bhanudej

8. King Phutthaloetla (Rama II)
4. King Mongkut (Rama IV)
9. Queen Sri Suriyendra
2. Prince Bhanurangsi
10. Prince Sirivongse, the Prince Matayaphithak
5. Queen Debsirindra
11. Mom Noi
1. Prince Bira
12. Lord (Khun) Chinda Pichitra
6. Phraya Mahindrasakdi Dhamrong
13. Mon Phenkul
3. Mom Lek Bhanubandh na Ayudhya (Yongchaiyudh)
14. Phraya Nakornindra Ramanya
7. Thanpuying Hun Phenkul
15. Unknown

== See also ==
- Chakri dynasty
- Formula One drivers from Thailand
- List of royal Olympians
