= David Murray (racing driver) =

British racing driver (1909–1973)

- Born: 28 December 1909; Edinburgh, Scotland
- Died: 5 April 1973 (aged 63); Las Palmas de Gran Canaria, Spain

Formula One World Championship career
- Nationality: (United Kingdom) British
- Active years: 1950–1952
- Team(s): Non-works Maserati, non-works Cooper
- Entries: 5 (4 starts)
- Championships: 0
- Wins: 0
- Podiums: 0
- Career points: 0
- Pole positions: 0
- Fastest laps: 0
- First entry: 1950 British Grand Prix
- Last entry: 1952 British Grand Prix

David Hugh Murray (28 December 1909 – 5 April 1973) was a British racing driver from Scotland. He participated in five Formula One World Championship Grands Prix, debuting on 13 May 1950, and also founded the Ecurie Ecosse Scottish motor racing team, based at Merchiston Mews in Edinburgh.

Murray was a chartered accountant by profession and raced an ERA and subsequently a Maserati 4CLT both domestically and in European events, before forming Ecurie Ecosse in 1952. He also participated in rallies and hill-climbs. After one World Championship event, for Ecosse, Murray retired as a driver to concentrate on running the team. Ecurie Ecosse won the Le Mans 24-hour race in both 1956 and 1957 each time with a Jaguar D-Type.

Murray moved abroad and was killed in a road accident in the Canary Isles on 5 April 1973.

== Racing record ==
=== 24 Hours of Le Mans results ===
Year	Team	Co-Drivers	Car	Class	Laps	Pos.	Class Pos.
1937	(United Kingdom) David Murray	(United Kingdom) Pat Fairfield	BMW 328	2.0	8	DNF	DNF

=== Complete Formula One World Championship results ===
(key)

Year	Entrant	Chassis	Engine	1	2	3	4	5	6	7	8	WDC	Pts
1950	Scuderia Ambrosiana	Maserati 4CLT/48	Maserati 4CLT 1.5 L4s	GBR; Ret	MON	500	SUI	BEL	FRA	ITA; Ret		NC	0
1951	Scuderia Ambrosiana	Maserati 4CLT/48	Maserati 4CLT 1.5 L4 s	SUI	500	BEL	FRA	GBR; Ret	GER; DNS	ITA	ESP	NC	0
1952	Ecurie Ecosse	Cooper T20	Bristol BS1 2.0 L6	SUI	500	BEL	FRA	GBR; Ret	GER	NED	ITA	NC	0

=== Complete Formula One non-championship results ===
(key)

Year	Entrant	Chassis	Engine	1	2	3	4	5	6	7	8	9	10	11	12	13	14	15	16	17
1950	Scuderia Ambrosiana	Maserati 4CLT/48	Maserati 1.5 s/c L4	PAU	RIC	SRM	PAR	EMP; Ret	BAR	JER; Ret	ALB	NED; 6	NAT; Ret	NOT	ULS; DNA	PES	STT	INT; Ret	GOO	PEN; NC
1951	Scuderia Ambrosiana	Maserati 4CLT/48	Maserati 1.5 s/c L4	SYR	PAU	RIC; Ret	SRM; NC	BOR	INT; NC	PAR	ULS; 6	SCO; Ret	NED	ALB						
1951	Scuderia Ambrosiana	Ferrari 125	Ferrari 1.5 s/c V12												PES; 8	BAR	GOO			
