= Dorino Serafini =

Italian racing driver (1909–2000)

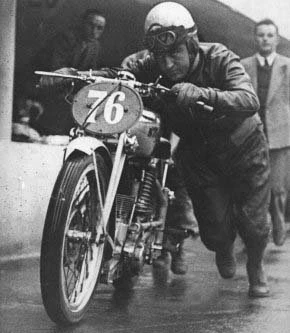
- Serafini in 1936
- Born: 22 July 1909
- Died: 5 July 2000 (aged 90)

Formula One World Championship career
- Nationality: (Italy) Italian
- Active years: 1950
- Team: Ferrari
- Entries: 1
- Championships: 0
- Wins: 0
- Podiums: 1
- Career points: 3
- Pole positions: 0
- Fastest laps: 0
- First entry: 1950 Italian Grand Prix

Teodoro "Dorino" Serafini (22 July 1909 – 5 July 2000) was an Italian racing driver and motorcycle road racer who most notably finished second in his only Formula One World Championship race for Ferrari, the 1950 Italian Grand Prix.

As he shared his drive at Monza on 3 September 1950 with Alberto Ascari, Serafini was awarded only half of the six available points for second place, yet he remains the only Formula One driver to have scored a podium finish in every World Championship Grand Prix they ever entered, even if only one race is taken into account.

== Career ==
A native of Pesaro, Serafini started racing motorcycles in 1928 on a Benelli 175cc. He won the 1939 500cc European Championship on a Gilera with victories in the German, Swedish and Ulster Grands Prix.

Serafini switched to racing single-seater cars in 1947, finishing second in the 1950 Mille Miglia and appearing in several non-Championship Formula One races. He retired from racing full-time after sustaining serious injuries during the 1951 Mille Miglia, which required multiple operations over several years, but came back for the 1954 Brescia-Rome-Brescia race, finishing seventh overall and first in the GT class.

== Racing record ==
=== Complete Formula One World Championship results ===
(key)

Year	Entrant	Chassis	Engine	1	2	3	4	5	6	7	WDC	Points
1950	Ferrari	Ferrari 375	Ferrari V12	GBR	MON	500	SUI	BEL	FRA	ITA; 2*	13th	3

* Indicates shared drive with Alberto Ascari

=== Non-championship Formula One results ===
(key)

Year	Entrant	Chassis	Engine	1	2	3	4	5	6	7	8	9	10	11	12	13	14	15	16	17
1950	Scuderia Ferrari	Ferrari 125	Ferrari V12	PAU	RIC	SRM; Ret	PAR	EMP	BAR; 7	JER	ALB	NED	NAT	NOT	ULS	PES	STT	INT	GOO	
1950	Scuderia Ferrari	Ferrari 375	Ferrari V12																	PEN; 2
1951	Scuderia Ferrari	Ferrari 212	Ferrari V12	SYR; 2	PAU; Ret	RIC														
1951	Scuderia Ferrari	Ferrari 375	Ferrari V12				SRM; Ret	BOR	INT	PAR	ULS	SCO	NED	ALB	PES	BAR	GOO			

Sporting positions
Preceded by Georg Meier	500cc Motorcycle European Champion; 1939	Succeeded by Omobono Tenni (1947)
