= Aldo Gordini =

French racing driver (1921–1995)

- Born: 20 May 1921; Bologna, Emilia-Romagna, Italy
- Died: 28 January 1995 (aged 73); Paris, France

Formula One World Championship career
- Nationality: (France) French
- Active years: 1951
- Team: Simca-Gordini
- Entries: 1
- Championships: 0
- Wins: 0
- Podiums: 0
- Career points: 0
- Pole positions: 0
- Fastest laps: 0
- First entry: 1951 French Grand Prix

Aldo Gordini (20 May 1921 – 28 January 1995) was a racing driver from France. Born in Bologna, Italy, he was the son of Amédée Gordini, owner of the French sports car manufacturer Gordini. Aldo worked for the family's racing team as a mechanic and occasionally drove in Grand Prix motor racing events and Formula Two races.

Gordini participated in one Formula One World Championship race on 1 July 1951 as well as one non-Championship Formula One race. That same year he also drove for the Gordini team at the 24 hours of Le Mans but fuel pump problems forced him out of the race.

Gordini died in Paris in 1995.

== Complete Formula One World Championship results ==
(key)

Year	Entrant	Chassis	Engine	1	2	3	4	5	6	7	8	WDC	Points
1951	Equipe Gordini	Simca-Gordini T11	Gordini Straight-4	SUI	500	BEL	FRA; Ret	GBR	GER	ITA	ESP	NC	0

=== Non-Championship Formula One results ===
(key)

Year	Entrant	Chassis	Engine	1	2	3	4	5	6	7	8	9	10	11	12	13	14
1951	Equipe Gordini	Simca-Gordini T15	Gordini Straight-4	SYR	PAU	RIC	SRM	BOR	INT	PAR; Ret	ULS	SCO	NED	ALB	PES	BAR	GOO
