= 1952 Pau Grand Prix =

Formula Two race

Race details
- Date: 14 April 1952
- Official name: XIII Grand Prix Automobile de Pau
- Location: Pau, France
- Course: Temporary Street Circuit
- Course length: 2.760 km (1.720 miles)
- Distance: 99 laps, 280.571 km (174.338 miles)

Pole position
Driver	(Italy) Alberto Ascari	Scuderia Ferrari
- Time: 1:43.3

Fastest lap
Driver	(Italy) Alberto Ascari	Scuderia Ferrari
- Time: 1:44.4

Podium
First	(Italy) Alberto Ascari	Scuderia Ferrari
Second	(France) Louis Rosier	Ecurie Rosier
Third	(France) Jean Behra	Equipe Gordini

The 1952 Pau Grand Prix was a Formula Two motor race held on 14 April 1952 at the Pau circuit, in Pau, Pyrénées-Atlantiques, France. The Grand Prix served as the first round of the French Formula Two Championship and was won by Alberto Ascari, driving the Ferrari 500. Louis Rosier finished second and Jean Behra third.

== Classification ==
=== Race ===
Pos	No	Driver	Vehicle	Laps	Time/Retired	Grid
1	32	(Italy) Alberto Ascari	Ferrari 500	99	3hrs 00min 10sec	1
2	12	(France) Louis Rosier	Ferrari 500	96	+ 3 laps	8
3	4	(France) Jean Behra	Gordini T16	94	+ 5 laps	10
4	10	(France) Élie Bayol	O.S.C.A. MT4	92	+ 7 laps	14
5	26	(France) Eugène Martin	Veritas Jicey 2	89	+ 10 laps	16
6	16	(Switzerland) Toulo de Graffenried	Maserati 4CLT/48	89	+ 10 laps	4
7	20	(United Kingdom) Lance Macklin	HWM 52	86	+ 13 laps	3
Ret	36	(Italy) Luigi Villoresi	Ferrari 500	78	Accident	2
Ret	8	(Belgium) Johnny Claes	Gordini T16	71	Transmission	13
Ret	6	(France) Robert Manzon	Gordini T16	66	Accident	6
Ret	14	(France) Maurice Trintignant	Ferrari 166	62	Mechanical	12
Ret	30	(Germany) Hans Stuck	AFM 6	49	Mechanical	15
Ret	18	(Italy) Nello Pagani	Maserati 4CLT/48	44	Engine	9
Ret	22	(United Kingdom) Peter Collins	HWM 52	42	Brakes	7
Ret	34	(Italy) Piero Scotti	Ferrari 500	8	Accident	17
Ret	28	(Switzerland) Rudi Fischer	Ferrari 500	4	Oil pipe	5
Ret	24	(France) Yves Giraud-Cabantous	HWM 52	4	Accident	11
DNA	6	(Thailand) B. Bira	Gordini T16		Did Not Attend	
DNA	18	(Monaco) Louis Chiron	Maserati 4CLT/48		Did Not Attend	
DNA	18	(France) André Simon	Maserati 4CLT/48		Did Not Attend	
DNA	34	(Italy) Giuseppe Farina	Ferrari 500		Did Not Attend	
Fastest Lap: Alberto Ascari (Scuderia Ferrari) – 1:44.4

Previous race: 1952 Lavant Cup	Formula One non-championship races 1952 season	Next race: 1952 Ibsley Grand Prix
Previous race: 1951 Pau Grand Prix	Pau Grand Prix	Next race: 1953 Pau Grand Prix
