= 1955 Bordeaux Grand Prix =

- Non-championship race in the 1955 Formula One season

Race details
- Date: 24 April 1955
- Official name: IV Grand Prix de Bordeaux
- Location: Bordeaux, France
- Course: Temporary Street Circuit
- Course length: 2.450 km (1.527 miles)
- Distance: 123 laps, 301.265 km (187.821 miles)

Pole position
| Driver | (France) Jean Behra | Maserati 250F |
- Time: 1:21.7

Fastest lap
| Driver | (United Kingdom) Stirling Moss | Maserati 250F |
- Time: 1:20.9

Podium
| First | (France) Jean Behra | Maserati 250F |
| Second | (Italy) Luigi Musso | MAserati 250F |
| Third | (Argentina) Roberto Mieres | Maserati 250F |

The 1955 Bordeaux Grand Prix was a non-championship Formula One motor race held on 24 April 1955 on a street circuit centred around the Place des Quinconces in Bordeaux, France. The Grand Prix was won by Jean Behra, who also set pole position, driving a Maserati 250F. Luigi Musso finished second and Roberto Mieres third. Less than a minute separated the three drivers after nearly three hours of racing. Stirling Moss, who had lost time fixing a loose tank strap, set fastest lap during a spirited attempt to catch the leading trio.

== Classification ==
=== Race ===
| Pos | No | Driver | Entrant | Car | Time/Retired | Grid |
|---|---|---|---|---|---|---|
| 1 | 14 | (France) Jean Behra | Officine Alfieri Maserati | Maserati 250F | 2:54:12.6, 65.07mph | 1 |
| 2 | 18 | (Italy) Luigi Musso | Officine Alfieri Maserati | Maserati 250F | +0.2s | 2 |
| 3 | 16 | (Argentina) Roberto Mieres | Officine Alfieri Maserati | Maserati 250F | +0.7s | 6 |
| 4 | 10 | (United Kingdom) Stirling Moss | Stirling Moss Ltd. | Maserati 250F | +1 lap | 3 |
| 5 | 2 | (France) Robert Manzon | Equipe Gordini | Gordini Type 16 | +2 laps | 7 |
| 6 | 22 | (Thailand) B. Bira | Prince Bira | Maserati 250F | +4 laps | 9 |
| Ret | 20 | (France) André Simon | André Simon | Maserati 250F | 99 laps, oil pressure | 10 |
| Ret | 10 | (France) Louis Rosier | Equipe Rosier | Maserati 250F | 81 laps, gear selector | 12 |
| Ret | 8 | (France) Maurice Trintignant (Italy) Giuseppe Farina | Scuderia Ferrari | Ferrari 555 | 70 laps, brake pipe | 5 |
| Ret | 4 | (France) Elie Bayol | Equipe Gordini | Gordini Type 16 | 22 laps, engine | 8 |
| Ret | 24 | (Spain) Alfonso de Portago | Marquis de Portago | Ferrari 625 | 15 laps, mechanical | 11 |
| Ret | 6 | (Italy) Giuseppe Farina | Scuderia Ferrari | Ferrari 555 | 14 laps, gearbox casing | 4 |

| Previous race: 1955 Glover Trophy | Formula One non-championship races 1955 season | Next race: 1955 BRDC International Trophy |
| Previous race: 1954 Bordeaux Grand Prix | Bordeaux Grand Prix | Next race: — |
