= 1952 Marseille Grand Prix =

- Non-championship race in the 1952 Formula One season

Race details
- Date: 27 April 1952
- Official name: X Grand Prix de Marseille
- Location: Parc Borély, Marseille
- Course: Temporary Street Circuit
- Course length: 2.629 km (1.639 miles)
- Distance: 134 laps, 352.28 km (219.63 miles)

Pole position
Driver	(Italy) Alberto Ascari	Ferrari
- Time: 1:17.8

Fastest lap
Driver	(Italy) Giuseppe Farina	Ferrari
- Time: 1:15.4

Podium
First	(Italy) Alberto Ascari	Ferrari
Second	(Thailand) B. Bira; (France) Robert Manzon	Simca Gordini
Third	(Belgium) Johnny Claes	Simca Gordini

The 10th Grand Prix de Marseille was a non-championship Formula Two motor race held on 27 April 1952 at the Parc Borély in Marseille. Race distance was decided not by distance but by time, the duration being 3 hours. The race was won by pole-setter Alberto Ascari driving a Ferrari 500. B. Bira and Robert Manzon shared second place in a Simca Gordini Type 15 and Johnny Claes was third in another Type 15. Ascari's teammate Giuseppe Farina set fastest lap but failed to finish the race.

== Classification ==
=== Race ===
Pos	No	Driver	Entrant	Car	Time/Retired	Grid
1	8	(Italy) Alberto Ascari	Scuderia Ferrari	Ferrari 500	134 laps, 119.79kph	1
2	6	(Thailand) B. Bira (France) Robert Manzon	Equipe Gordini	Simca Gordini Type 15	+5 laps	14
3	34	(Belgium) Johnny Claes	Ecurie Belge	Simca Gordini Type 15	+7 laps	16
4	24	(Switzerland) Emmanuel de Graffenried	Scuderio Enrico Platé	Maserati 4CLT/48	+10 laps	9
5	30	(France) Élie Bayol	Élie Bayol	O.S.C.A. MT4	+11 laps	11
NC	4	(France) Jean Behra	Equipe Gordini	Simca Gordini Type 15	+23 laps	4
NC	10	(Italy) Giuseppe Farina	Scuderia Ferrari	Ferrari 500	+23 laps, crash	6
NC	22	(United Kingdom) Peter Collins	HW Motors	HWM-Alta	+35 laps	12
NC	28	(Germany) Hans Stuck	Hans Stuck	AFM-Küchen	+38 laps	15
Ret	18	(United Kingdom) Lance Macklin	HW Motors	HWM-Alta	60 laps, fuel tank	8
Ret	16	(France) Louis Rosier	Ecurie Rosier	Ferrari 500	59 laps, oil loss	7
Ret	14	(France) Maurice Trintignant	Ecurie Rosier	Ferrari 166	48 laps, oil loss	5
Ret	26	(Italy) Franco Cortese	Scuderia Enrico Platé	Maserati 4CLT/48	32 laps, lubrication	10
Ret	32	(United Kingdom) Peter Whitehead	Peter Whitehead	Alta F2	30 laps, oil pipe	18
Ret	2	(France) Robert Manzon	Equipe Gordini	Simca Gordini Type 15	25 laps, gearbox	2
Ret	12	(Italy) Luigi Villoresi	Scuderia Ferrari	Ferrari 500	9 laps, engine	3
Ret	20	(France) Yves Giraud-Cabantous	HW Motors	HWM-Alta	3 laps, oil pump	13
DNS	36	(France) Eugène Martin	Eugène Martin	Jicey-Veritas	car not ready	17

Previous race: 1952 Ibsley Grand Prix	Formula One non-championship races 1952 season	Next race: 1952 Aston Martin Owners Club Formula 2 Race
Previous race: 1951 Marseille Grand Prix	Marseille Grand Prix	Next race: 1953 Marseille Grand Prix
