= 1953 Naples Grand Prix =

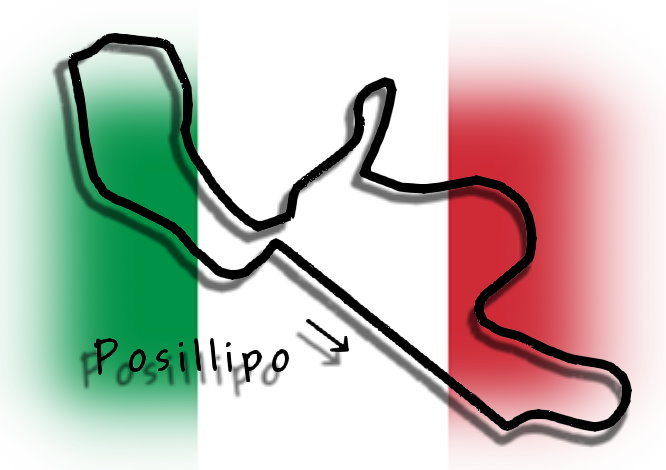

Race details
- Date: 10 May 1953
- Official name: VI Gran Premio di Napoli
- Location: Posillipo, Naples
- Course: Street circuit
- Course length: 4.10 km (2.55 mi)
- Distance: 60 laps, 246.02 km (152.87 mi)

Pole position
Driver	(Italy) Giuseppe Farina	Ferrari
- Time: 2:07.9

Fastest lap
Driver	(Italy) Alberto Ascari	Ferrari
- Time: 2:07.7

Podium
First	(Italy) Giuseppe Farina	Ferrari
Second	(Argentina) Juan Manuel Fangio	Maserati
Third	(Argentina) José Froilán González	Maserati

The 6th Gran Premio di Napoli was a Formula Two motor race held on 10 May 1953 at Posillipo, Naples. The race was run over 60 laps of the circuit, and was won by Italian driver Giuseppe Farina in a Ferrari 500, starting from pole. Maserati teammates Juan Manuel Fangio and José Froilán González were second and third, both driving a Maserati A6GCM. Alberto Ascari set fastest lap in a Ferrari 500 but finished in fifth place, five laps down.

== Results ==
Pos	Driver	Entrant	Constructor	Time/Position	Grid
1	(Italy) Giuseppe Farina	Scuderia Ferrari	Ferrari 500	2:12:17.10, 111.58 kph	1
2	(Argentina) Juan Manuel Fangio	Officine Alfieri Maserati	Maserati A6GCM	+18.30s	3
3	(Argentina) José Froilán González	Officine Alfieri Maserati	Maserati A6GCM	+22.53s	4
4	(Italy) Luigi Villoresi	Scuderia Ferrari	Ferrari 500	+1 lap	5
5	(Italy) Alberto Ascari	Scuderia Ferrari	Ferrari 500	+5 laps	2
NC	(Italy) Raffaele Argenziano	Raffaele Argenziano	Paganelli-Fiat	+8 laps	6
Ret	(Italy) Rodolfo d'Apuzzo	Guglielmo Esposito	Camen-Fiat	22 laps, axle	7
Ret	(Italy) Giuseppe Ruggiero	Giuseppe Ruggiero	Maserati A6GCS	4 laps	8

Previous race: 1953 Eläintarhanajot	Formula One non-championship races 1953 season	Next race: 1953 Ulster Trophy
Previous race: 1952 Naples Grand Prix	Naples Grand Prix	Next race: 1954 Naples Grand Prix
