= Georges Grignard =

French racing driver (1905–1977)

- Born: 25 July 1905; Villeneuve-Saint-Georges, France
- Died: 7 December 1977 (aged 72); Le Port-Marly, France

Formula One World Championship career
- Nationality: (France) French
- Active years: 1951
- Team: Talbot-Lago
- Entries: 1
- Championships: 0
- Wins: 0
- Podiums: 0
- Career points: 0
- Pole positions: 0
- Fastest laps: 0
- First entry: 1951 Spanish Grand Prix

Auguste Georges Paul Grignard (25 July 1905 – 7 December 1977) was a racing driver from France. He raced in Formula One from 1947 to 1953, participating in one World Championship Grand Prix on 28 October 1951. He also participated in numerous non-Championship races, including winning the 1950 Paris Grand Prix.

== Complete Formula One World Championship results ==
(key)

| Year | Entrant | Chassis | Engine | 1 | 2 | 3 | 4 | 5 | 6 | 7 | 8 | WDC | Points |
|---|---|---|---|---|---|---|---|---|---|---|---|---|---|
| 1951 | Georges Grignard | Talbot-Lago T26C-DA | Talbot | SUI | 500 | BEL | FRA | GBR | GER | ITA | ESP; Ret | NC | 0 |
