= 1952 Naples Grand Prix =

- Non-championship race in the 1952 Formula One season
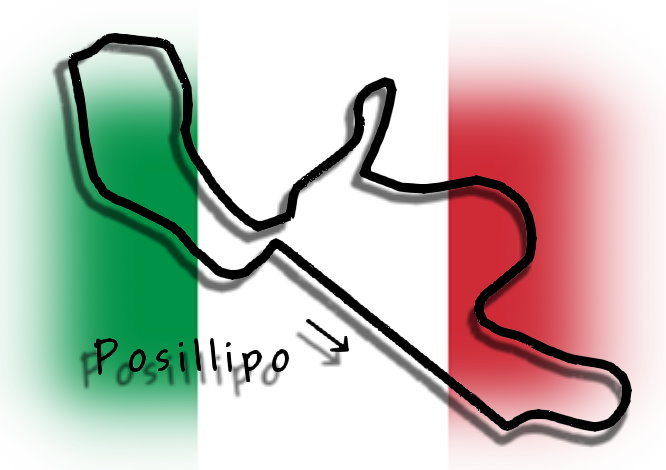

Race details
- Date: 11 May 1952
- Official name: V Gran Premio di Napoli
- Location: Posillipo, Naples
- Course: Street circuit
- Course length: 4.10 km (2.55 mi)
- Distance: 60 laps, 246.02 km (152.87 mi)

Pole position
Driver	(Italy) Giuseppe Farina	Ferrari

Fastest lap
Driver	(Italy) Giuseppe Farina	Ferrari
- Time: 2:15.1

Podium
First	(Italy) Giuseppe Farina	Ferrari
Second	(Italy) Piero Taruffi	Ferrari
Third	(Italy) Franco Comotti	Ferrari

The 5th Gran Premio di Napoli was a motor race, run to Formula Two rules, held on 11 May 1952 at Posillipo, Naples. The race was run over 60 laps of the circuit, and was won by Italian driver Giuseppe Farina in a Ferrari 500. Farina also took pole and set fastest lap. Teammate Piero Taruffi was second and Franco Comotti was third in a privateer Ferrari 166.

== Results ==
Pos	No.	Driver	Entrant	Constructor	Time/Position	Grid
1	10	(Italy) Giuseppe Farina	Scuderia Ferrari	Ferrari 500	2:19:40.4, 105.530 kph	1
2	4	(Italy) Piero Taruffi	Scuderia Ferrari	Ferrari 500	+1:48.6	2
3	2	(Italy) Franco Comotti	Scuderia Marzotto	Ferrari 166	+5 laps	9
4	24	(Italy) Giuseppe Rossi	Giuseppe Rossi	Stanguellini-Fiat	+6 laps	12
5	38	(Italy) Sergio Sighinolfi	Scuderia Marzotto	Ferrari 166	+10 laps, accident	5
6	22	(France) Louis Rosier	Ecurie Rosier	Ferrari 500	+12 laps	4
7	16	(Italy) Giuseppe Ruggiero	Giuseppe Ruggiero	Maserati A6G	+12 laps	7
Ret	20	(Italy) Agostino Accadia	Agostinio Accadia	FDS-Fiat	36 laps	13
Ret	14	(France) André Simon	Scuderia Ferrari	Ferrari 500	34 laps, accident	3
Ret.	32	(Italy) Giovanni Rocco	Giovanni Rocco	Monaci 8C	24 laps, mechanical	6
Ret.	26	(Italy) Luigi Bellucci	Luigi Belluccii	Paganelli-Fiat	18 laps, mechanical	8
Ret.	8	(Italy) Giuseppe Giordano	Giuseppe Giordano	Cisitalia D46	7 laps	10
Ret.	18	(Italy) Clemente Biondetti	Clemente Biondetti	PS Speziale	3 laps	11

Previous race: 1952 Eläintarhanajot	Formula One non-championship races 1952 season	Next race: 1952 Eifelrennen
Previous race: 1951 Naples Grand Prix	Naples Grand Prix	Next race: 1953 Naples Grand Prix
