= 1952 Aston Martin Owners Club Formula 2 Race =

- Non-championship race in the 1952 Formula One season

Race details
- Date: 3 May 1952
- Official name: I Aston Martin Owners Club Formula 2 Race
- Location: Snetterton Circuit, Norfolk
- Course: Permanent racing facility
- Course length: 4.361 km (2.719 miles)
- Distance: 10 laps, 43.61 km (27.19 miles)

Fastest lap
Driver	(United Kingdom) Charles Bulmer	BMW Special
- Time: 2:04.8

Podium
First	(United Kingdom) Dickie Stoop	Frazer Nash
Second	(United Kingdom) Cliff Davis	Cooper-MG
Third	(United Kingdom) Bobby Pattenden	HWM-Alta

The 1st Aston Martin Owners Club Formula 2 Race was a motor race, run to Formula Two rules, held on 3 May 1952 at Snetterton Circuit, Norfolk. The race was run over 10 laps of the circuit, and was won by British driver Dickie Stoop in a Frazer Nash Mille Miglia. Cliff Davis in a Cooper T14-MG was second and Bobby Pattenden in an HWM-Alta was third. Charles Bulmer in a BMW Special set fastest lap.

== Results ==
Pos	No.	Driver	Entrant	Constructor	Time/Retired
1	42	(United Kingdom) Dickie Stoop	R. Stoop	Frazer Nash Mille Miglia	22:22.8, 72.64mph
2	51	(United Kingdom) Cliff Davis	C. Davis	Cooper T14-MG	+12.2s
3	4	(United Kingdom) Bobby Pattenden	R. Pattenden	HWM-Alta	+57.8s
4	52	(United Kingdom) Lionel Leonard	L. Leonard	Cooper T21-MG	+1:38.8
5	41	(United Kingdom) Charles Bulmer	R.C. Willis	BMW Special-Bristol	9 laps, head gasket
Ret	6	(United Kingdom) Ray Merrick	R. Merrick	Cooper T12-JAP	6 laps, engine
Ret	45	(United Kingdom) Gary Gartside	G, Gartside	Aston Martin DB	
DNA	7	(United Kingdom) Eric Brandon	Ecurie Richmond	Cooper T20-Bristol	
DNA	8	(United Kingdom) Alan Brown	Ecurie Richmond	Cooper T20-Bristol	

Previous race: 1952 Marseille Grand Prix	Formula One non-championship races 1952 season	Next race: 1952 BRDC International Trophy
Previous race: —	Aston Martin Owners Club F2 Race	Next race: —
