= 1950 Goodwood Trophy =

- Non-championship race in the 1950 Formula One season

Race details
- Date: 30 September 1950
- Official name: III Goodwood Trophy
- Location: Goodwood Circuit
- Course length: 3.830 km ( miles)
- Distance: 12 laps, 45.966 km ( miles)

Pole position
Driver	(Belgium) Johnny Claes	Talbot-Lago

Fastest lap
Driver	(United Kingdom) Reg Parnell	BRM
- Time: 1:41.8

Podium
First	(United Kingdom) Reg Parnell	BRM
Second	(Thailand) Prince Bira	Maserati
Third	(United Kingdom) Bob Gerard	ERA

The 1950 Goodwood Trophy was a non-championship Formula One motor race held at Goodwood Circuit on 30 September 1950.

== Classification ==
=== Race ===
Pos	No	Driver	Manufacturer	Laps	Time/Retired	Grid
1	1	(United Kingdom) Reg Parnell	BRM	12	20:58.4	7
2	2	(Thailand) Prince Bira	Maserati	12	+ 2.0	8
3	7	(United Kingdom) Bob Gerard	ERA	12	+ 41.0	12
4	3	(Switzerland) Toulo de Graffenried	Maserati	12		9
5	14	(United Kingdom) Brian Shawe-Taylor	ERA	11	+ 1 lap	6
6	9	(United Kingdom) Graham Whitehead	ERA	10	+ 2 laps	2
7	16	(United Kingdom) Stirling Moss	HWM-Alta	10	+ 2 laps	13
8	4	(United Kingdom) David Hampshire	Maserati	10	+ 2 laps	14
9	5	(United Kingdom) Duncan Hamilton	Maserati	10	+ 2 laps	15
10	18	(United Kingdom) Geoff Richardson	RRA	9	+ 3 laps	10
11	6	(Belgium) Johnny Claes	Talbot-Lago	9	+ 3 laps	1
12	8	(United Kingdom) Peter Whitehead	Ferrari	9	+ 3 laps	11
Ret	11	(United Kingdom) Joe Ashmore	ERA	1		3
Ret	10	(United Kingdom) Gordon Watson	Alta	0		4
DNS	15	(United Kingdom) George Abecassis	HWM-Alta	0		5

Previous race: 1950 BRDC International Trophy	Formula One non-championship races 1950 season	Next race: 1950 Penya Rhin Grand Prix
Previous race: 1949 Goodwood Trophy	Goodwood Trophy	Next race: 1951 Goodwood Trophy
