= 1951 Syracuse Grand Prix =

- Non-championship race in the 1951 Formula One season
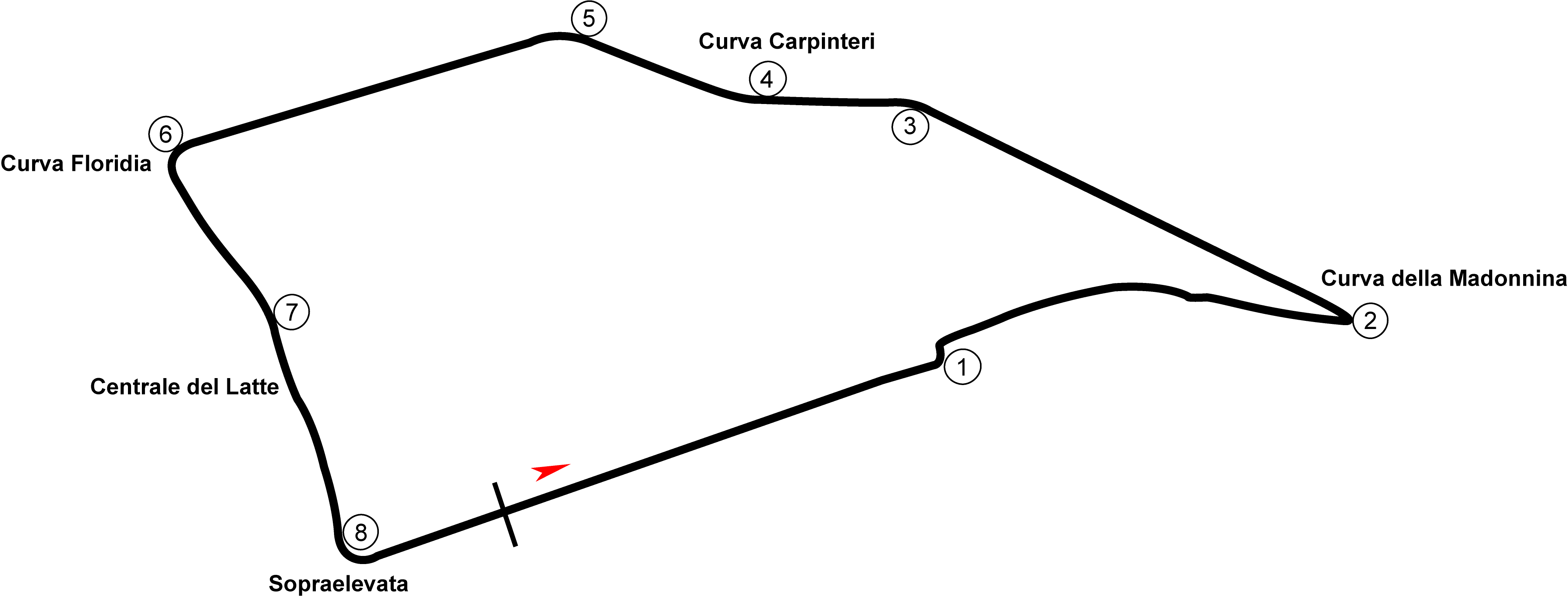

Race details
- Date: 11 March 1951
- Official name: I Gran Premio di Siracusa
- Location: Syracuse Circuit, Syracuse, Sicily
- Course: Temporary road circuit
- Course length: 5.400 km (3.355 miles)
- Distance: 80 laps, 432.027 km (268.449 miles)

Pole position
Driver	(Italy) Alberto Ascari	Ferrari

Fastest lap
Driver	(Italy) Alberto Ascari	Ferrari
- Time: 2:06.1

Podium
First	(Italy) Luigi Villoresi	Ferrari
Second	(Italy) Dorino Serafini	Ferrari
Third	(Switzerland) Rudi Fischer	Ferrari

The 1951 Syracuse Grand Prix was a non-championship Formula One motor race held in Syracuse, Sicily on 11 March 1951.

== Classification ==
=== Race ===
Pos	No	Driver	Manufacturer	Laps	Time/Retired	Grid
1	24	(Italy) Luigi Villoresi	Ferrari	80	2:57:31.6	3
2	18	(Italy) Dorino Serafini	Ferrari	77	+ 3 laps	4
3	26	(Switzerland) Rudi Fischer	Ferrari	77	+ 3 laps	6
4	2	(France) Henri Louveau	Talbot-Lago	76	+ 4 laps	7
5	4	(France) Louis Rosier	Talbot-Lago	75	+ 5 laps	9
Ret	20	(Italy) Alberto Ascari	Ferrari	69	Engine	1
NC	10	(Switzerland) Pierre Staechelin	Ferrari	68	+ 12 laps	12
Ret	16	(Italy) Nino Farina	Maserati	47	Engine	2
Ret	22	(United States) Harry Schell	Maserati	40		10
Ret	14	(Thailand) Prince Bira	Maserati	38		8
Ret	8	(Italy) Ferdinando Righetti	Ferrari	18		11
Ret	12	(Italy) Giovanni Bracco	Ferrari	3		5

Previous race: 1950 Chilean Grand Prix	Formula One non-championship races 1951 season	Next race: 1951 Pau Grand Prix
Previous race: —	Syracuse Grand Prix	Next race: 1952 Syracuse Grand Prix
