= 1950 Pau Grand Prix =

- Non-championship race in the 1950 Formula One season

Race details
- Date: 10 April 1950
- Official name: XI Grand Prix Automobile de Pau
- Location: Pau, France
- Course: Street Circuit
- Course length: 2.769 km (1.720 miles)
- Distance: 110 laps, 304.590 km (189.263 miles)

Pole position
Driver	(Argentina) Juan Manuel Fangio	Maserati
- Time: 1:43.1

Fastest lap
Driver	(Argentina) Juan Manuel Fangio	Maserati
- Time: 1:42.8

Podium
First	(Argentina) Juan Manuel Fangio	Maserati
Second	(Italy) Luigi Villoresi	Ferrari
Third	(France) Louis Rosier	Talbot-Lago

The 1950 Pau Grand Prix was a non-championship Formula One motor race held on 10 April 1950 at the Pau circuit, in Pau, Pyrénées-Atlantiques, France. It was the second race of the 1950 Formula One season, and was conducted on the same day as the 1950 Richmond Trophy. The 110-lap race was won by Maserati driver Juan Manuel Fangio after starting from pole position. Luigi Villoresi finished second in a Ferrari, and Louis Rosier third in a Talbot-Lago.

== Classification ==
=== Race ===
Pos	No	Driver	Entrant	Manufacturer	Laps	Time/Retired	Grid
1	10	(Argentina) Juan Manuel Fangio	Scuderia Achille Varzi	Maserati	110	3:14:20.0	1
2	2	(Italy) Luigi Villoresi	Scuderia Ferrari	Ferrari	110	+ 30.5	2
3	14	(France) Louis Rosier	Ecurie Rosier	Talbot-Lago	110	+ 1:02.2	4
4	6	(France) Raymond Sommer	Scuderia Ferrari	Ferrari	109	+ 1 Lap	3
5	22	(France) Robert Manzon	Equipe Gordini	Simca-Gordini	106	+ 4 Laps	8
6	28	(France) Pierre Levegh	Pierre Levegh	Talbot-Lago	104	+ 6 Laps	10
7	20	(France) Maurice Trintignant	Equipe Gordini	Simca-Gordini	103	+ 7 Laps	11
8	16	(France) Charles Pozzi (France) Georges Grignard	Charles Pozzi	Talbot-Lago	100	+ 10 Laps	13
Ret	18	(Monaco) Louis Chiron	Officine Alfieri Maserati	Maserati	56	Rear axle	7
Ret	8	(France) Philippe Étancelin	Philippe Étancelin	Talbot-Lago	53	Drive shaft	12
Ret	24	(France) André Simon	Equipe Gordini	Simca-Gordini	32	Crash	9
Ret	12	(Argentina) José Froilán González	Scuderia Achille Varzi	Maserati	25	Differential	5
Ret	4	(Italy) Alberto Ascari	Scuderia Ferrari	Ferrari	10	Rear axle	6
DNA	26	(Italy) Felice Bonetto	Scuderia Milano	Maserati		Car not ready	

Previous race: 1949 Buenos Aires Grand Prix (III)	Formula One non-championship races 1950 season	Next race: 1950 Richmond Trophy
Previous race: 1949 Pau Grand Prix	Pau Grand Prix	Next race: 1951 Pau Grand Prix
