= 1951 Richmond Trophy =

- Non-championship race in the 1951 Formula One season

Race details
- Date: 26 March 1951
- Official name: III Richmond Trophy
- Location: Chichester, UK
- Course: Goodwood Circuit
- Course length: 3.830 km ( miles)
- Distance: 12 laps, 45.970 km ( miles)

Pole position
Driver	(United Kingdom) Graham Whitehead	ERA

Fastest lap
Driver	(Thailand) Prince Bira	Maserati
- Time: 1:35.6

Podium
First	(Thailand) Prince Bira	Maserati
Second	(United Kingdom) Brian Shawe-Taylor	ERA
Third	(United Kingdom) Duncan Hamilton	ERA

The 1951 Richmond Trophy was a non-championship Formula One motor race held at the Goodwood Circuit on 26 March 1951.

== Classification ==
=== Race ===
Pos	No	Driver	Manufacturer	Laps	Time/Retired	Grid
1	20	(Thailand) Prince Bira	Maserati	12	19:44.0	3
2	27	(United Kingdom) Brian Shawe-Taylor	ERA	12	+ 17.2	6
3	28	(United Kingdom) Duncan Hamilton	ERA	12	+ 25.4	5
4	30	(Belgium) Johnny Claes	Talbot-Lago	12	+ 29.4	11
5	1	(United Kingdom) Stirling Moss	HWM-Alta	12	+ 50.0	9
6	26	(United Kingdom) Graham Whitehead	ERA	12	+ 1:18.6	1
7	2	(United Kingdom) Lance Macklin	HWM-Alta	12	+ 1:19.4	10
Ret	21	(United Kingdom) Reg Parnell	Maserati	5	Engine	4
Ret	24	(United Kingdom) Bob Gerard	ERA	2	Mechanical	8
Ret	35	(United Kingdom) David Murray	Maserati	0		7
DNS	25	(United Kingdom) Fred Ashmore	ERA	0	Mechanical	2

Previous race: 1951 Pau Grand Prix	Formula One non-championship races 1951 season	Next race: 1951 San Remo Grand Prix
Previous race: 1950 Richmond Trophy	Richmond Trophy	Next race: 1952 Richmond Trophy
