= 1951 Pau Grand Prix =

Race details
- Date: 26 March 1951
- Official name: XII Grand Prix Automobile de Pau
- Location: Pau, France
- Course: Temporary Street Circuit
- Course length: 2.760 km (1.720 miles)
- Distance: 110 laps, 311.591 km (193.613 miles)

Pole position
Driver	(Italy) Alberto Ascari	Ferrari 375
- Time: 1:40.8

Fastest lap
Driver	(Italy) Alberto Ascari	Ferrari 375
- Time: 1:41.7

Podium
First	(Italy) Luigi Villoresi	Ferrari 375
Second	(France) Louis Rosier	Talbot-Lago T26C
Third	(Italy) Giuseppe Farina	Maserati 4CLT

The 1951 Pau Grand Prix was a non-championship Formula One motor race held on 26 March 1951 at the Pau circuit, in Pau, Pyrénées-Atlantiques, France. The Grand Prix was won by Luigi Villoresi, driving the Ferrari 375. Louis Rosier finished second and Giuseppe Farina third.

== Classification ==
=== Race ===
Pos	No	Driver	Vehicle	Laps	Time/Retired	Grid
1	10	(Italy) Luigi Villoresi	Ferrari 375	110	3hrs 17min 39.9sec	2
2	18	(France) Louis Rosier	Talbot-Lago T26C	110	+ 1:35.8 s	4
3	2	(Italy) Giuseppe Farina	Maserati 4CLT	107	+ 3 laps	6
4	28	(France) Yves Giraud-Cabantous	Talbot-Lago T26C	107	+ 3 laps	11
5	16	(France) Philippe Étancelin	Talbot-Lago T26C	105	+ 5 laps	9
6	30	(Switzerland) Rudi Fischer	Ferrari 212	104	+ 6 laps	8
Ret	20	(France) Henri Louveau	Talbot-Lago T26C	92	Crash	13
Ret	26	(Switzerland) Toulo de Graffenried	Maserati 4CLT/48	66	Oil pressure	5
Ret	14	(Italy) Dorino Serafini	Ferrari 212	49	Steering	3
Ret	12	(Italy) Alberto Ascari	Ferrari 375	46	Transmission	1
Ret	22	(France) Georges Grignard	Talbot-Lago T26C	43	Gearbox	15
Ret	6	(France) Robert Manzon	Simca-Gordini T15	42	Gearbox	10
Ret	8	(France) André Simon	Simca-Gordini T15	35	Brake drum	7
Ret	4	(France) Maurice Trintignant	Simca-Gordini T15	25	Engine	12
Ret	24	(United States) Harry Schell	Maserati 4CLT/48	14	Radiator	14
Fastest Lap: Alberto Ascari (Ferrari 375) – 1:41.7

Previous race: 1951 Syracuse Grand Prix	Formula One non-championship races 1951 season	Next race: 1951 Richmond Trophy
Previous race: 1950 Pau Grand Prix	Pau Grand Prix	Next race: 1952 Pau Grand Prix
