= 1952 Eläintarhanajot =

- Non-championship race in the 1952 Formula One season

Race details
- Date: 11 May 1952
- Official name: XIV Eläintarhanajot
- Location: Helsinki, Finland
- Course: Eläintarha
- Course length: 2.000 km (1.247 miles)
- Distance: 25 laps, 50.00 km (31.17 miles)

Pole position
Driver	(Sweden) Gunnar Carlsson	Ardun Special

Podium
First	(Belgium) Roger Laurent	Talbot-Lago
Second	(Sweden) Erik Lundgren	Ford Special
Third	(Norway) Carl Stausland	Ford Special

The XIV Eläintarhajot was a non-championship Formula One motor race held at Eläintarha, Helsinki on 11 May 1952. The race was won by Roger Laurent in a Talbot-Lago T26C by just one tenth of a second from Erik Lundgren.

== Results ==
Pos	Driver	Car	Time/Retired	Grid
1	(Belgium) Roger Laurent	Talbot-Lago T26C	30:19.5, 98.934kph	3
2	(Sweden) Erik Lundgren	Ford Special	+0.1s	2
3	(Norway) Carl Stausland	Ford Special	+8.5s	4
4	Einar Nyhus	Ford Special	+1:22.3	7
5	(Finland) Leo Mattila	Ford Special	+1:22.8	8
6	(Finland) Evert Saloranta	Ford Special	+2:24.1	6
7	(Sweden) Gunnar Wahlberg	TM Special	+2:50.9	9
8	(Finland) Adiel Paananen	Allard J2	+4:16.4	11
Ret	(Finland) Arvo Karlsson	Ford Special		10
Ret	(Sweden) Gunnar Carlsson	Ardun Special		1
Ret	(Sweden) John Kvarnstrom	Hudson Special		5

Previous race: 1952 BRDC International Trophy	Formula One non-championship races 1952 season	Next race: 1952 Naples Grand Prix
Previous race: 1951 Eläintarhanajot	Eläintarhanajot	Next race: 1953 Eläintarhanajot
