= 1950 Paris Grand Prix =

- Non-championship race in the 1950 Formula One season
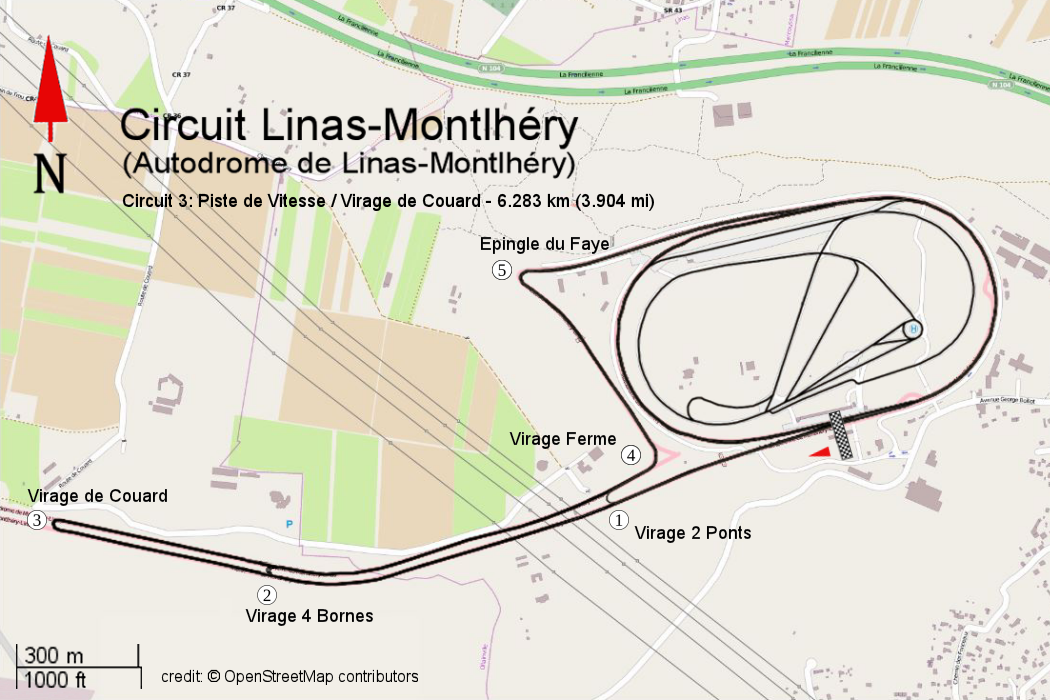

Race details
- Date: 30 April 1950
- Official name: IV Grand Prix de Paris
- Location: Montlhéry, France
- Course length: 9.181 km (5.705 miles)
- Distance: 50 laps, 496.570 km (308.554 miles)

Fastest lap
Driver	(France) Raymond Sommer	Talbot-Lago
- Time: 2:20.3

Podium
First	(France) Georges Grignard	Talbot-Lago
Second	(France) Louis Gérard	Delage
Third	(France) Marc Versini	Delage

The 1950 Paris Grand Prix was a Non-Championship Formula One motor race held on 30 April 1950 at the Autodrome de Linas-Montlhéry, in Montlhéry near Paris, France. It was the fourth race of the 1950 Formula One season.

The 50-lap race was won by Talbot-Lago driver Georges Grignard, who finished four laps ahead of Louis Gérard, who finished second in a Delage, with Marc Versini third, also in a Delage. These were the only three finishers.

== Results ==
Pos	No.	Driver	Entrant	Constructor	Laps	Time/Retired
1	8	(France) Georges Grignard	Georges Grignard	Talbot-Lago	50	2.05:38.8
2	15	(France) Louis Gérard	Louis Gérard	Delage	46	+ 4 Laps
3	12	(France) Marc Versini	Marc Versini	Delage	45	+ 5 Laps
Ret	6	(France) Raymond Sommer	Raymond Sommer	Talbot-Lago	33	Engine
Ret	17	(United Kingdom) Stirling Moss	John Heath	HWM-Alta	33	Con-rod
Ret	5	(France) Pierre Levegh	Pierre Levegh	Talbot-Lago	28	Engine
Ret	11	(France) Jean Judet	Jean Judet	Maserati	26	Fuel tank
Ret	4	(France) Louis Rosier	Ecurie Rosier	Talbot-Lago	21	Engine
Ret	16	(United Kingdom) George Abecassis	John Heath	HWM-Alta	11	Engine
Ret	14	(France) Auguste Veuillet	Auguste Veuillet	Delage	2	Rear axle
Ret	9	(France) Guy Mairesse	Ecurie France	Talbot-Lago	2	Fuel tank
DNA	1	(France) Henri Louveau	Henri Louveau	Maserati		
DNA	2	(France) Yves Giraud-Cabantous	Yves Giraud-Cabantous	Talbot-Lago		
DNA	3	(France) Philippe Étancelin	Philippe Étancelin	Talbot-Lago		
DNA	7	(Belgium) Johnny Claes	Ecurie Belge	Talbot-Lago		
DNA	10	(France) Jean Estager	Ecurie France	Talbot-Lago		

Previous race: 1950 San Remo Grand Prix	Formula One non-championship races 1950 season	Next race: 1950 British Empire Trophy
Previous race: 1949 Paris Grand Prix	Paris Grand Prix	Next race: 1951 Paris Grand Prix
