= 1951 Paris Grand Prix =

- Non-championship race in the 1951 Formula One season

Race details
- Date: 20 May 1951
- Official name: V Grand Prix de Paris
- Location: Bois de Boulogne, France
- Course length: 2.503 km (1.560 miles)
- Distance: 125 laps, 312.831 km (195.032 miles)

Pole position
Driver	(Switzerland) Emmanuel de Graffenried	Maserati
- Time: 1:19.2

Fastest lap
Driver	(Argentina) Juan Manuel Fangio	Simca-Gordini
- Time: 1:18.7

Podium
First	(Italy) Giuseppe Farina	Maserati
Second	(Argentina) José Froilán González	Talbot-Lago
Third	(France) Louis Rosier	Talbot-Lago

The 1951 Paris Grand Prix was a non-championship Formula One motor race held on 20 May 1951 at the Bois de Boulogne, in Paris, France. It was the last motor race to take place at the circuit, due to concerns over driver and spectator safety.

The 125-lap race was won by Maserati driver Giuseppe Farina, with José Froilán González and Louis Rosier second and third in Talbot-Lagos. Emmanuel de Graffenried started from pole in a Maserati and Juan Manuel Fangio set fastest lap in a Simca-Gordini.

== Results ==
Pos	No.	Driver	Entrant	Constructor	Time/Retired	Grid
1	24	(Italy) Giuseppe Farina	Scuderia Milano	Maserati 4CLT/48	2:53:12.5, 108.36 kph	2
2	22	(Argentina) José Froilán González	José Froilán González	Talbot-Lago T26C	+39.6	13
3	2	(France) Louis Rosier	Ecurie Rosier	Talbot-Lago T26C	+62.0	7
4	10	(France) Henri Louveau	Ecurie Rosier	Talbot-Lago T26C	+4 laps	9
5	6	(France) Philippe Étancelin	Philippe Étancelin	Talbot-Lago T26C	+4 laps	3
6	4	(France) Pierre Levegh	Pierre Levegh	Talbot-Lago T26C	+6 laps	11
7	26	(Switzerland) Emmanuel de Graffenried (United States) Harry Schell	Enrico Platé	Maserati 4CLT/48	+9 laps	1
8	4	(France) Louis Gérard	Louis Gérard	Delage	+13 laps	12
Ret	18	(France) André Simon	Equipe Gordini	Simca-Gordini Type 15	93 laps, brakes/valves	4
Ret	32	(France) Aldo Gordini	Equipe Gordini	Simca-Gordini Type 15	73 laps, valves	14
Ret	14	(France) Maurice Trintignant	Equipe Gordini	Simca-Gordini Type 15	53 laps, clutch	8
Ret	1	(Argentina) Juan Manuel Fangio	Equipe Gordini	Simca-Gordini Type 15	49 laps, valve	6
Ret	16	(France) Robert Manzon	Equipe Gordini	Simca-Gordini Type 15	20 laps, clutch	5
Ret	12	(France) Yves Giraud-Cabantous	Yves Giraud-Cabantous	Talbot-Lago T26C	16 laps, valve	10
DNS	28	(United States) Harry Schell	Enrico Platé	Maserati 4CLT/48	shared #26	
DNA	8	(France) Georges Grignard	Georges Grignard	Talbot-Lago T26C		

Previous race: 1951 BRDC International Trophy	Formula One non-championship races 1951 season	Next race: 1951 Ulster Trophy
Previous race: 1950 Paris Grand Prix	Paris Grand Prix	Next race: 1952 Paris Grand Prix
