= 1950 Richmond Trophy =

- Non-championship race in the 1950 Formula One season

Race details
- Date: April 10, 1950
- Official name: II Richmond Trophy
- Location: Goodwood Circuit, West Sussex
- Course: Permanent racing facility
- Course length: 3.788 km (2.354 miles)
- Distance: 11 laps, 41.67 km (25.89 miles)

Pole position
| Driver | (United Kingdom) Cuth Harrison (by ballot) | ERA |

Fastest lap
| Driver | (United Kingdom) Reg Parnell | Maserati |
- Time: 1.46.0

Podium
| First | (United Kingdom) Reg Parnell | Maserati |
| Second | (Switzerland) Toulo de Graffenried | Maserati |
| Third | (United Kingdom) Brian Shawe-Taylor | ERA |

The 2nd Richmond Trophy was a non-championship Formula One race held at Goodwood Circuit, West Sussex, England. It was a short race of only 11 laps and was won by Reg Parnell in a Maserati 4CLT/48. Parnell also set fastest lap.

== Classification ==
| Pos | No | Driver | Entrant | Car | Laps | Time/Retired | Grid^{1} |
|---|---|---|---|---|---|---|---|
| 1 | 22 | (United Kingdom) Reg Parnell | Scuderia Ambrosiana | Maserati 4CLT/48 | 11 | 20:14.4 | 3 |
| 2 | 20 | (Switzerland) Toulo de Graffenried | Enrico Platé | Maserati 4CLT/48 | 11 | + 46.0 | 13 |
| 3 | 29 | (United Kingdom) Brian Shawe-Taylor | Brian Shawe-Taylor | ERA B-Type | 11 | | 7 |
| 4 | 28 | (United Kingdom) Cuth Harrison | Cuth Harrison | ERA B-Type | 11 | | 1 |
| 5 | 25 | (United Kingdom) Graham Whitehead | Peter Whitehead | ERA B-Type | 11 | | 5 |
| 6 | 5 | (United Kingdom) George Abecassis | John Heath | HWM-Alta | 11 | | 12 |
| 7 | 32 | (United Kingdom) Colin Murray | Charles Murray | Maserati 6CM | 10 | | 8 |
| 8 | 31 | (United Kingdom) Philip Fotheringham-Parker | Duncan Hamilton | Maserati 6CM | 10 | | 6 |
| 9 | 33 | (United Kingdom) Gordon Watson | Gordon Watson | Alta | 9 | | 10 |
| Ret | 21 | (Thailand) Prince Bira | Enrico Platé | Maserati 4CLT/48 | 4 | Withdrew - lack of visibility | 9 |
| DNS | 24 | (United Kingdom) Peter Whitehead | Peter Whitehead | Ferrari 125 | Engine problems | | 2 |
| DNS | 26 | (United Kingdom) Peter Walker | Peter Walker | ERA E-Type | Oil leak | | 4 |
| DNS | 23 | (United Kingdom) David Hampshire | Scuderia Ambrosiana | Maserati 4CLT/48 | Car raced by Parnell | | 11 |
| DNQ | 30 | (United Kingdom) Tony Rolt | Rob Walker Racing Team | Delage 15 S8 | Loose cylinder | | - |
| DNQ | 34 | (United Kingdom) Archie J. Butterworth | Archie Butterworth | A.J.B.-Duesenberg | Car not ready | | - |

^{1}Grid places drawn by ballot

| Previous race: 1950 Pau Grand Prix | Formula One non-championship races 1950 season | Next race: 1950 San Remo Grand Prix |
| Previous race: 1949 Richmond Trophy | Richmond Trophy | Next race: 1951 Richmond Trophy |
