= 1950 Ulster Trophy =

- Non-championship race in the 1950 Formula One season

Race details
- Date: 12 August 1950
- Official name: IV Ulster Trophy
- Location: Dundrod, Northern Ireland, UK
- Course: Dundrod Circuit
- Course length: 7.417 km ( miles)
- Distance: 15 laps, 111.255 km ( miles)

Pole position
Driver	(United Kingdom) Brian Shawe-Taylor	ERA

Fastest lap
Driver	(United Kingdom) Peter Whitehead	Ferrari
- Time: 5:06.6

Podium
First	(United Kingdom) Peter Whitehead	Ferrari
Second	(United Kingdom) Bob Gerard	ERA
Third	(United Kingdom) Cuth Harrison	ERA

The 1950 Ulster Trophy was a non-championship Formula One motor race held on 12 August 1950 at the Dundrod Circuit, in Northern Ireland.

== Classification ==
=== Race ===
Pos	No	Driver	Manufacturer	Laps	Time/Retired	Grid
1	14	(United Kingdom) Peter Whitehead	Ferrari	15	1:19.09	2
2	1	(United Kingdom) Bob Gerard	ERA	15	+ 16.0	4
3	2	(United Kingdom) Cuth Harrison	ERA	15	+ 1:15.0	3
4	8	(Republic of Ireland) Joe Kelly	Alta	14	+ 1 lap	5
5	9	(Republic of Ireland) Torrie Large	Maserati	14	+ 1 lap	6
Ret	3	(United Kingdom) Sidney Allard	Allard-Steyr	9	Gasket	7
Ret	4	(United Kingdom) Bobbie Baird	MG	7	Accident	9
Ret	12	(United Kingdom) Brian Shawe-Taylor	ERA	5	Magneto drive	1
Ret	6	(United Kingdom) Geoff Crossley	Alta	4	Magneto drive	8

Previous race: 1950 Nottingham Trophy	Formula One non-championship races 1950 season	Next race: 1950 Coppa Acerbo
Previous race: 1947 Ulster Trophy	Ulster Trophy	Next race: 1951 Ulster Trophy
