= 1950 Nottingham Trophy =

- Non-championship race in the 1950 Formula One season
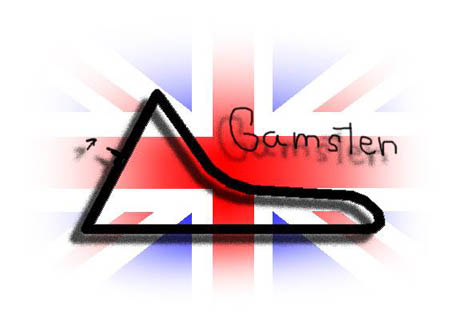

Race details
- Date: 7 August 1950
- Official name: I Nottingham Trophy
- Location: Retford, UK
- Course: Retford Gamston Airport
- Course length: 3.098 km ( miles)
- Distance: 20 laps, 61.96 km ( miles)

Pole position
Driver	(United Kingdom) David Hampshire	Maserati

Fastest lap
Driver	(United Kingdom) David Hampshire	Maserati
- Time: 1:14.4

Podium
First	(United Kingdom) David Hampshire	Maserati
Second	(United Kingdom) Reg Parnell	Maserati
Third	(United Kingdom) Geoff Richardson	ERA

The 1950 Nottingham Trophy was a non-championship Formula One motor race held on 7 August 1950 at the Retford Gamston Airport, in Retford, Nottinghamshire, England.

== Classification ==
=== Race ===
Pos	No	Driver	Entrant	Manufacturer	Laps	Time/Retired	Grid
1	80	(United Kingdom) David Hampshire		Maserati	20	25:21.4	1
2	81	(United Kingdom) Reg Parnell		Maserati	20	+ 5.0	
3	29	(United Kingdom) Geoff Richardson		ERA	19	+ 1 lap	
4	28	(United Kingdom) Gillie Tyrer		BMW	18	+ 2 Laps	

Previous race: 1950 Nations Grand Prix	Formula One non-championship races 1950 season	Next race: 1950 Ulster Trophy
Previous race: —	Nottingham Trophy	Next race: —
