= 1950 Sheffield Telegraph Trophy =

- Non-championship race in the 1950 Formula One season
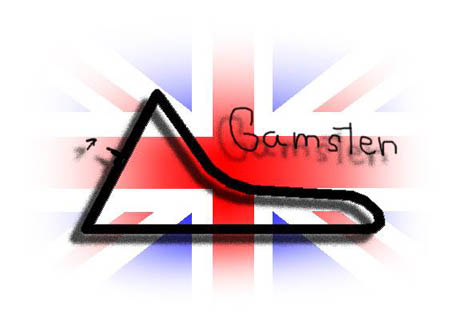

Race details
- Date: 19 August 1950
- Official name: I Sheffield Telegraph Trophy
- Location: Gamston Circuit
- Course length: 1.900 km (1.181 miles)
- Distance: 10 laps, 19.000 km (11.806 miles)

Podium
First	(United Kingdom) Cuth Harrison	ERA
Second	(United Kingdom) Alan Rogers	Cooper

The 1950 Sheffield Telegraph Trophy was a non-championship Formula One race in the 1950 season. It was won by its only finisher, Cuth Harrison. There was no qualifying session.

== Classification ==
=== Race ===
Pos	Driver	Manufacturer
1	(United Kingdom) Cuth Harrison	ERA
2	(United Kingdom) Alan Rogers	Cooper
DNS	(United Kingdom) Crowley Milling	ERA
DNS	(United Kingdom) Gordon Shillito	Riley

Previous race: 1950 Coppa Acerbo	Formula One non-championship races 1950 season	Next race: 1950 BRDC International Trophy
Previous race: —	Sheffield Telegraph Trophy	Next race: —
