= 1951 Bordeaux Grand Prix =

- Non-championship race in the 1951 Formula One season

Race details
- Date: 29 April 1951
- Official name: I Grand Prix de Bordeaux
- Location: Bordeaux, France
- Course: Bordeaux Circuit
- Course length: 2.458 km ( miles)
- Distance: 123 laps, 302.337 km ( miles)

Pole position
Driver	(France) Louis Rosier	Talbot-Lago

Fastest lap
Driver	(France) Louis Rosier	Talbot-Lago
- Time: 1:28.1

Podium
First	(France) Louis Rosier	Talbot-Lago
Second	(Switzerland) Rudi Fischer	Ferrari
Third	(United Kingdom) Peter Whitehead	Ferrari

The 1951 Bordeaux Grand Prix was a non-championship Formula One motor race held in Bordeaux on 29 April 1951.

== Classification ==
=== Race ===
Pos	No	Driver	Manufacturer	Laps	Time/Retired	Grid
1	14	(France) Louis Rosier	Talbot-Lago	123	3:07:11.3	1
2	22	(Switzerland) Rudi Fischer	Ferrari	123	+ 1:09.0	4
3	26	(United Kingdom) Peter Whitehead	Ferrari	121	+ 2 laps	5
4	28	(Thailand) Prince Bira	Maserati	119	+ 4 laps	7
5	4	(France) Maurice Trintignant	Simca-Gordini	117	Retired	2
6	16	(France) Henri Louveau	Talbot-Lago	116	+ 7 laps	14
7	30	(Monaco) Louis Chiron	HWM-Alta	114	+ 9 laps	15
NC	24	(Switzerland) Pierre Staechelin	Ferrari	106	+ 17 laps	13
Ret	8	(France) André Simon	Simca-Gordini	76	Fuel pump	11
Ret	18	(France) Yves Giraud-Cabantous	Talbot-Lago		Gearbox	8
Ret	20	(United Kingdom) Lance Macklin	HWM-Alta		Carburettors	9
Ret	2	(Italy) Nino Farina	Maserati		Supercharger	10
Ret	6	(France) Robert Manzon	Simca-Gordini		Gasket	6
Ret	12	(United States) Harry Schell	Maserati	4		3
Ret	10	(Switzerland) Emmanuel de Graffenried	Maserati	0		12
DNA	32	(Switzerland) Toni Branca	Maserati			

Previous race: 1951 San Remo Grand Prix	Formula One non-championship races 1951 season	Next race: 1951 BRDC International Trophy
Previous race: —	Bordeaux Grand Prix	Next race: —
