= 1951 Dutch Grand Prix =

- Non-championship race in the 1951 Formula One season

Race details
- Date: 22 July 1951
- Official name: II Grote Prijs van Nederland
- Location: Zandvoort, Netherlands
- Course: Permanent racing facility
- Course length: 4.193 km (2.605 miles)
- Distance: 90 laps, 377.370 km (234.488 miles)

Pole position
Driver	(Italy) Nino Farina	Maserati
- Time: 1:52.9

Fastest lap
Driver	(Belgium) André Pilette	Talbot-Lago
- Time: 1:54.0

Podium
First	(France) Louis Rosier	Talbot-Lago
Second	(France) Philippe Étançelin	Talbot-Lago
Third	(United Kingdom) Stirling Moss	HWM-Alta

The 1951 Dutch Grand Prix was a motor race held on 22 July 1951 at Circuit Park Zandvoort, Netherlands. It was the second Dutch Grand Prix set to Formula One rules. The race was won for the second year in a row by French driver Louis Rosier in a Talbot-Lago.

== Results ==
Pos	No	Driver	Constructor	Laps	Time/Retired
1	16	(France) Louis Rosier	Talbot-Lago	90	2:59'19.4
2	8	(France) Philippe Étançelin	Talbot-Lago	89	+1 lap
3	28	(United Kingdom) Stirling Moss	HWM-Alta	89	+1 lap
4	26	(Switzerland) Rudi Fischer	Ferrari	88	+2 Laps
5	30	(United Kingdom) Duncan Hamilton	Talbot-Lago	86	+4 Laps
6	24	(United Kingdom) Lance Macklin	HWM-Alta	84	Out of Fuel
7	14	(Belgium) André Pilette	Talbot-Lago	84	Accident
8	2	(United Kingdom) John Heath	HWM-Alta	82	+8 laps
Ret	10	(Belgium) Johnny Claes	Talbot-Lago	61	Valves
Ret	12	(Italy) Nino Farina	Maserati	46	Oil pipe
Ret	4	(Monaco) Louis Chiron	Talbot-Lago	41	Brakes
Ret	18	(France) Pierre Levegh	Talbot-Lago	37	Valves

Previous race: 1951 Scottish Grand Prix	Formula One non-championship races 1951 season	Next race: 1951 Albi Grand Prix
Previous race: 1950 Dutch Grand Prix	Dutch Grand Prix	Next race: 1952 Dutch Grand Prix
