= Formula One drivers from Switzerland =

List of Formula One drivers who competed as Swiss

- Drivers: 29
- Grands Prix: 427
- Entries: 505
- Starts: 445
- Best season finish: 2nd (1974)
- Wins: 7
- Podiums: 36
- Pole positions: 7
- Fastest laps: 20
- Points: 348
- First entry: 1950 British Grand Prix
- First win: 1968 British Grand Prix
- Latest win: 1979 British Grand Prix
- Latest entry: 2011 Brazilian Grand Prix
- 2026 drivers: None

A total of 29 drivers from Switzerland have entered Formula One World Championship Grands Prix motor races, with 23 of them having started a race.

== Former drivers ==
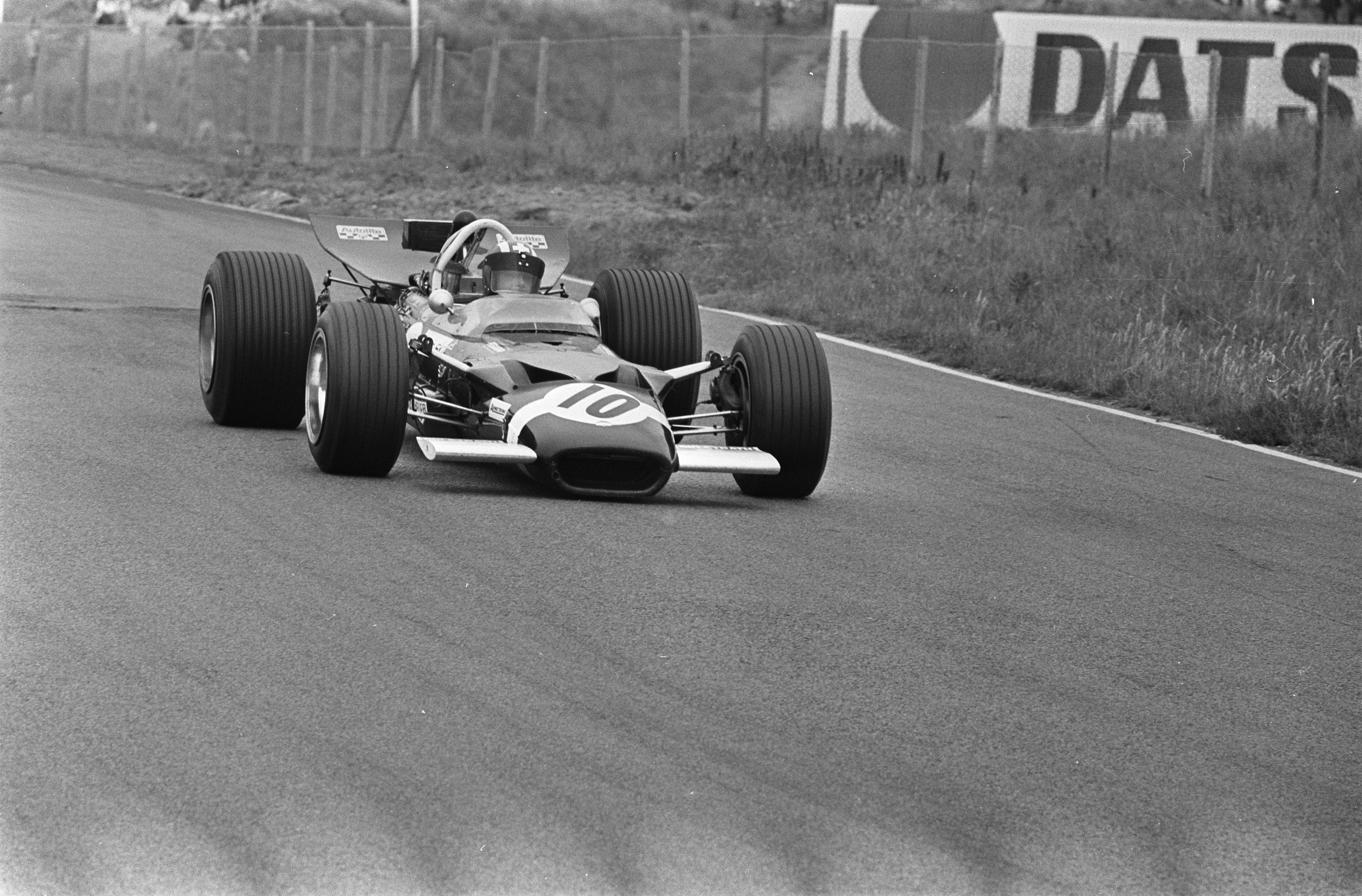
Siffert driving for Rob Walker at the 1969 Dutch Grand Prix

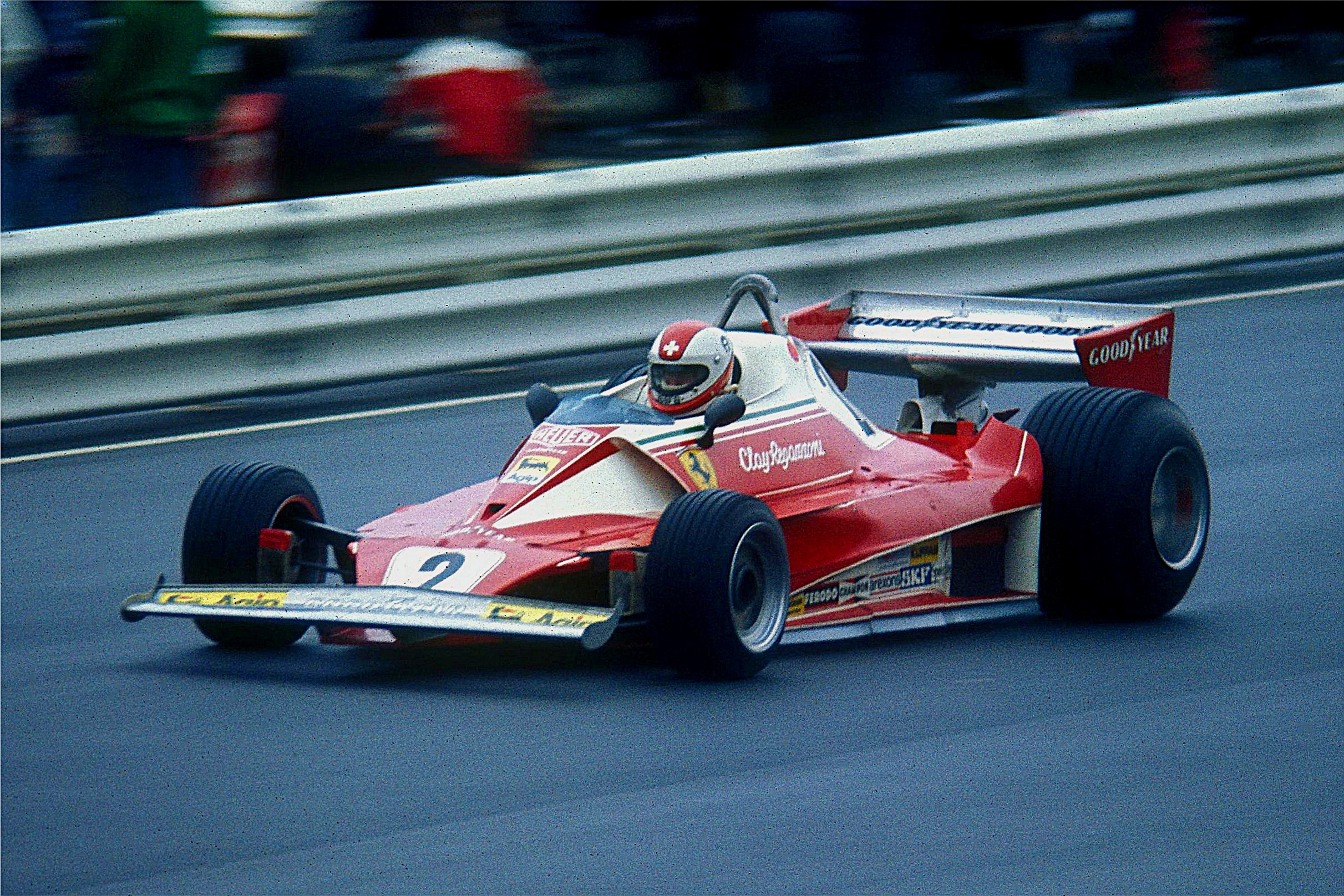
Regazzoni driving for Ferrari at the 1976 German Grand Prix

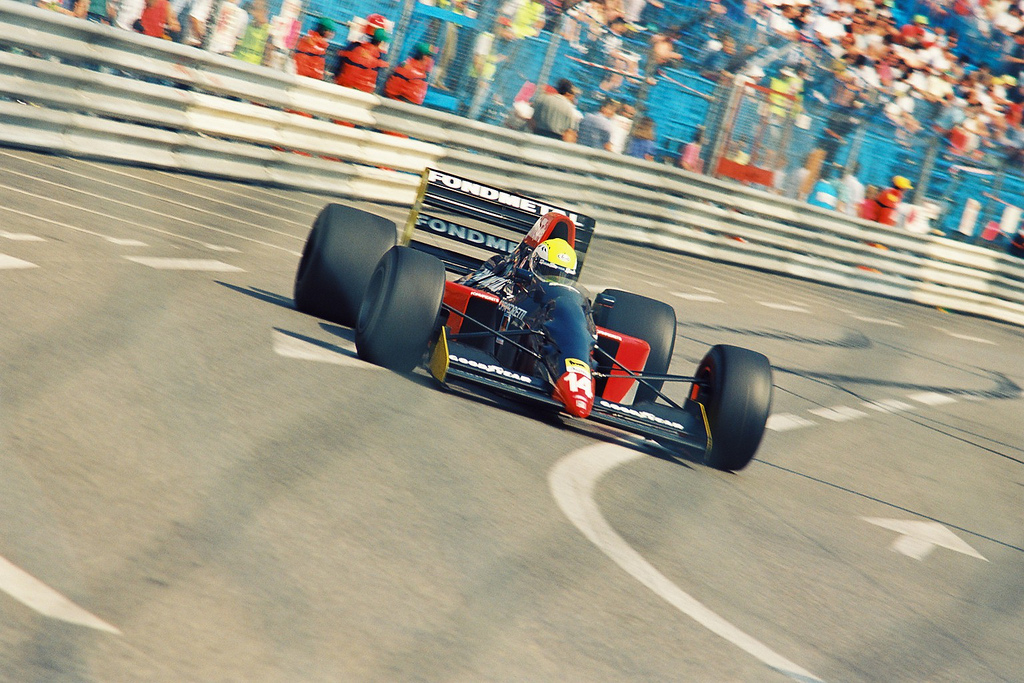
Chiesa driving for Fondmetal at the 1992 Monaco Grand Prix

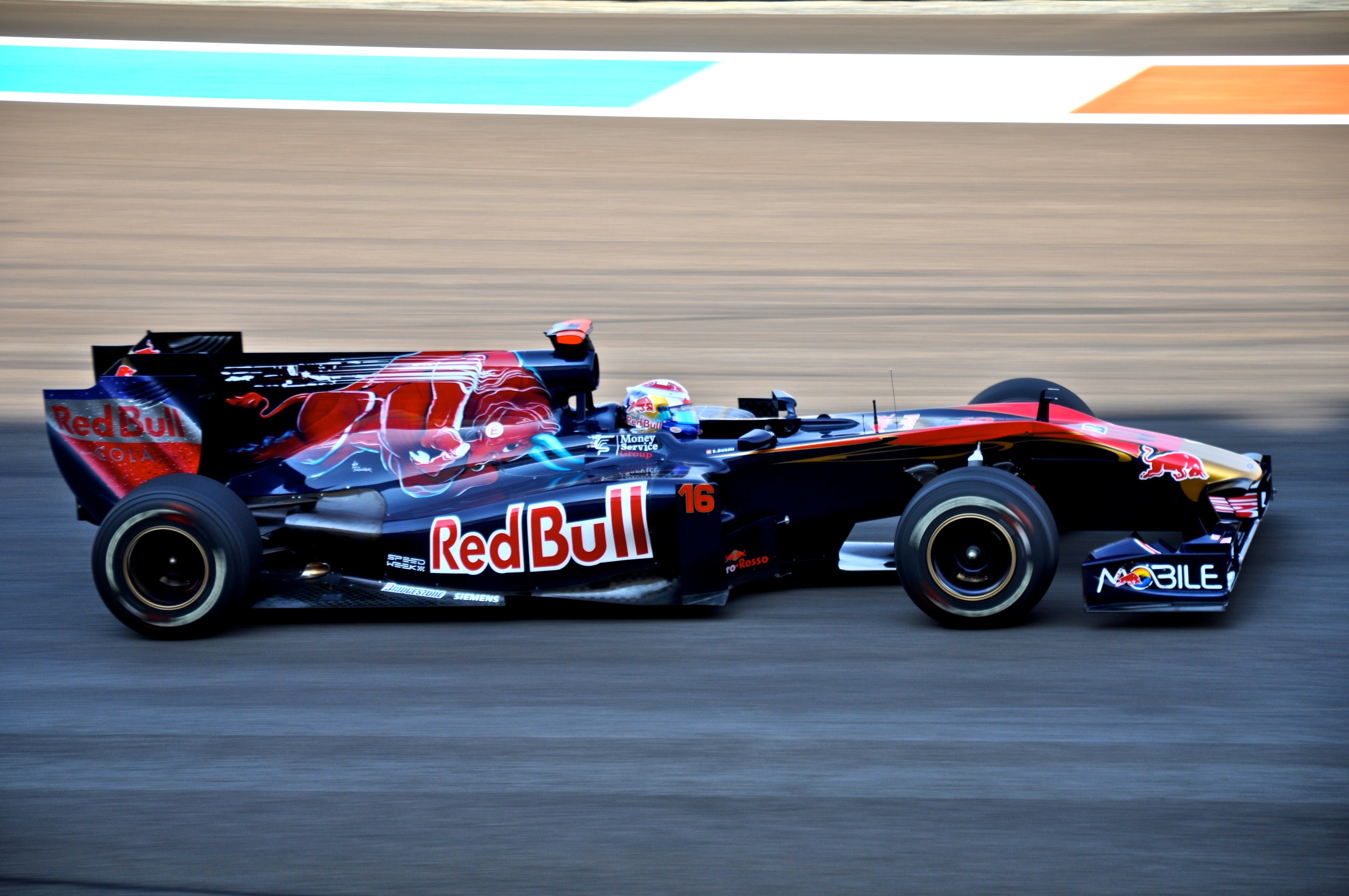
Buemi driving for Toro Rosso at the 2010 Abu Dhabi Grand Prix

Switzerland's first Formula One driver was Emmanuel 'Toulo' de Graffenried who participated in 23 Grands Prix making his debut at the first Formula One Championship Grand Prix. His career spanned the first 7 seasons of Formula One. He managed to score points in 4 races with a best result of 4th in the 1953 Belgian Grand Prix.

Toni Branca made his debut in his home Grand Prix of 1950, finishing 11th. He also competed in the 1950 Belgian Grand Prix and the 1951 German Grand Prix, finishing 10th in the former and retiring with engine failure in the latter.

Rudi Fischer was the first Swiss driver to reach the podium in Formula One. Despite only starting 7 Grands Prix he made the podium twice; with 2nd in Switzerland and 3rd in Germany, both in 1952. Those were his only points finishes.

Switzerland's next driver was Peter Hirt. He entered five races in the early 1950s, culminating in three retirements, a 7th place and an 11th-place finish.

Rudolf Schoeller participated in one race; the 1952 German Grand Prix, he retired on lap three with suspension issues.

Max de Terra entered his home Grands Prix of 1952 and 1953, he retired from the former and finished 8th in the latter.

Albert Scherrer also only entered one race, the 1953 Swiss Grand Prix, he finished 16 laps down and unclassified in his customer HWM.

A lawyer by trade, Ottorino Volonterio entered three Grands Prix between 1954 and 1957. His best result was 11th in the 1957 Italian Grand Prix, a drive he shared with Frenchman André Simon.

Michael May started two races in the 1961 season. He retired in Monaco after 42 laps with oil feeder issues and managed an 11th-place finish in France, albeit four laps down. Former speedboat racer Heinz Schiller made his debut at the 1962 German Grand Prix. He retired after four laps, and only went on to compete in Non-Championship races after that.

Heini Walter also made his sole appearance at the 1962 German Grand Prix. He finished 14th and one lap down.

Switzerland's first Grand Prix winner was Jo Siffert. In a career spanning 10 seasons he won two races (Britain 1968 and Austria 1971) from 96 starts, with a best championship finish of 5th in 1971. His life was cut short following an accident at the non-championship Victory Race in October 1971.

Jean-Claude Rudaz entered one race, the 1964 Italian Grand Prix. His engine blew up in the warm-up and as a result he failed to make the grid.

Silvio Moser entered 20 races between 1966 and 1971, starting 12 times. He scored points twice and only finished on three other occasions. Xavier Perrot entered a single race in 1969 (1969 German Grand Prix) in an F2 car.

Debuting for Ferrari in 1970, Clay Regazzoni made an instant impact in Formula One winning in Italy and finishing the year in third place. Switzerland's most successful racer managed 11 seasons in F1 in teams such as Ferrari, Williams and BRM, alongside drivers such as Niki Lauda and Alan Jones. He won five races and finished second in the 1974 Drivers' Championship, three points shy of Emerson Fittipaldi.

Jo Vonlanthen's sole Grand Prix start came at Austria 1975, but only lasted 14 laps before his engine expired. His entry was at Wilson Fittipaldi's expense.

Loris Kessel competed in six races in 1976 and 1977. He failed to qualify for half and was only a classified finisher in one: the 1976 Belgian Grand Prix. He later ran a privateer GT3 team.

Marc Surer's debut was somewhat troubled. After completing the final three races of 1979 for Ensign (only making the grid once), he'd entered just two in 1980 before breaking his legs at Kyalami. Following his recovery, he began a career as one of Formula One's perennial midfielders. He scored points in 11 of the 82 races he started including a best of fourth in the 1981 Brazilian Grand Prix (incl. fastest lap) and 1985 Italian Grand Prix.

Franco Forini entered three races in 1987 for Osella, he retired from the first two and failed to qualify for the third.

Gregor Foitek entered his first Grand Prix in 1989 for EuroBrun. He failed to qualify for any of the 11 races he entered with the team, so he switched to Rial Racing – and quit after suffering a high-speed crash. He drove for Brabham in the first races of 1990 with whom he made his debut, but following two DNFs he moved to Onyx, making the finish for the first time with 7th in Monaco before the team collapsed six races later.

Fondmetal entered Andrea Chiesa for the first ten races of 1992. He only made the grid three times and retired from all three races. He was replaced with Eric van de Poele.

Jean-Denis Délétraz entered the final race of the 1994 season for the cash-strapped Larrousse team. He started 26th and retired from the race after 57 laps having been lapped ten times. He was later signed by Pacific for two races during their 1995 campaign, retiring in Portugal and finishing 15th, seven laps down and unclassified, at the Nürburgring.

Sébastien Buemi made all 55 of his starts with Scuderia Toro Rosso as a Red Bull junior driver. Another strong midfield contender, he finished in a best position of 7th in both his debut race and the 2009 Brazilian Grand Prix.

Car salesman Peter Monteverdi is credited with an entry to the 1961 German Grand Prix, however withdrew before the event. He later went on to purchase Onyx Grand Prix in 1990, a deal that lasted 10 races before the team collapsed.

There were 4 additional drivers who are credited with entries but did not participate in a grand prix weekend: Herbert Müller, Peter Stæchelin, Francis Rochat and Alfred Dattner.

There have also been 3 drivers who have participated in Friday practice only: Neel Jani, Giorgio Mondini and Fabio Leimer.

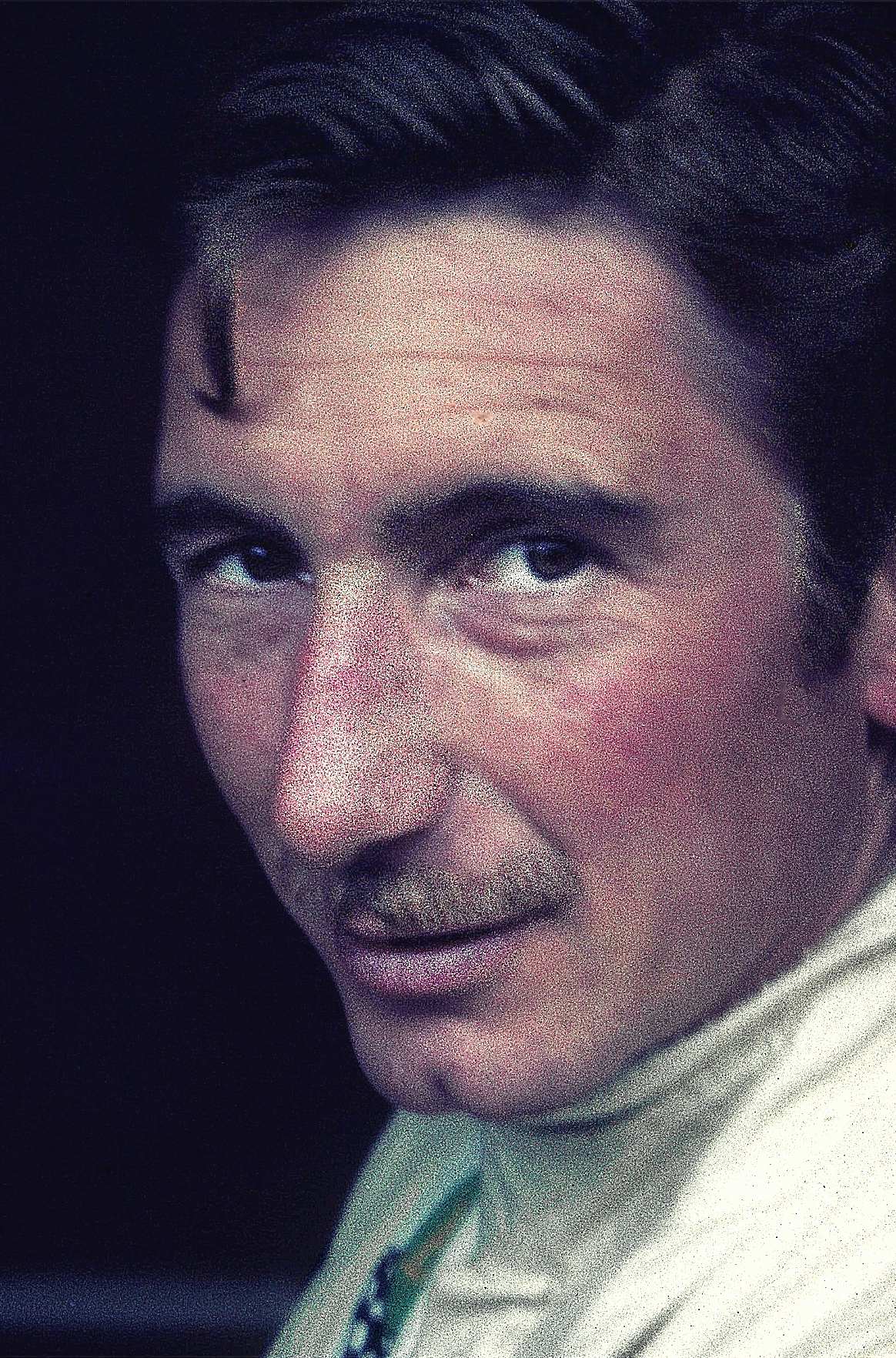
Jo Siffert

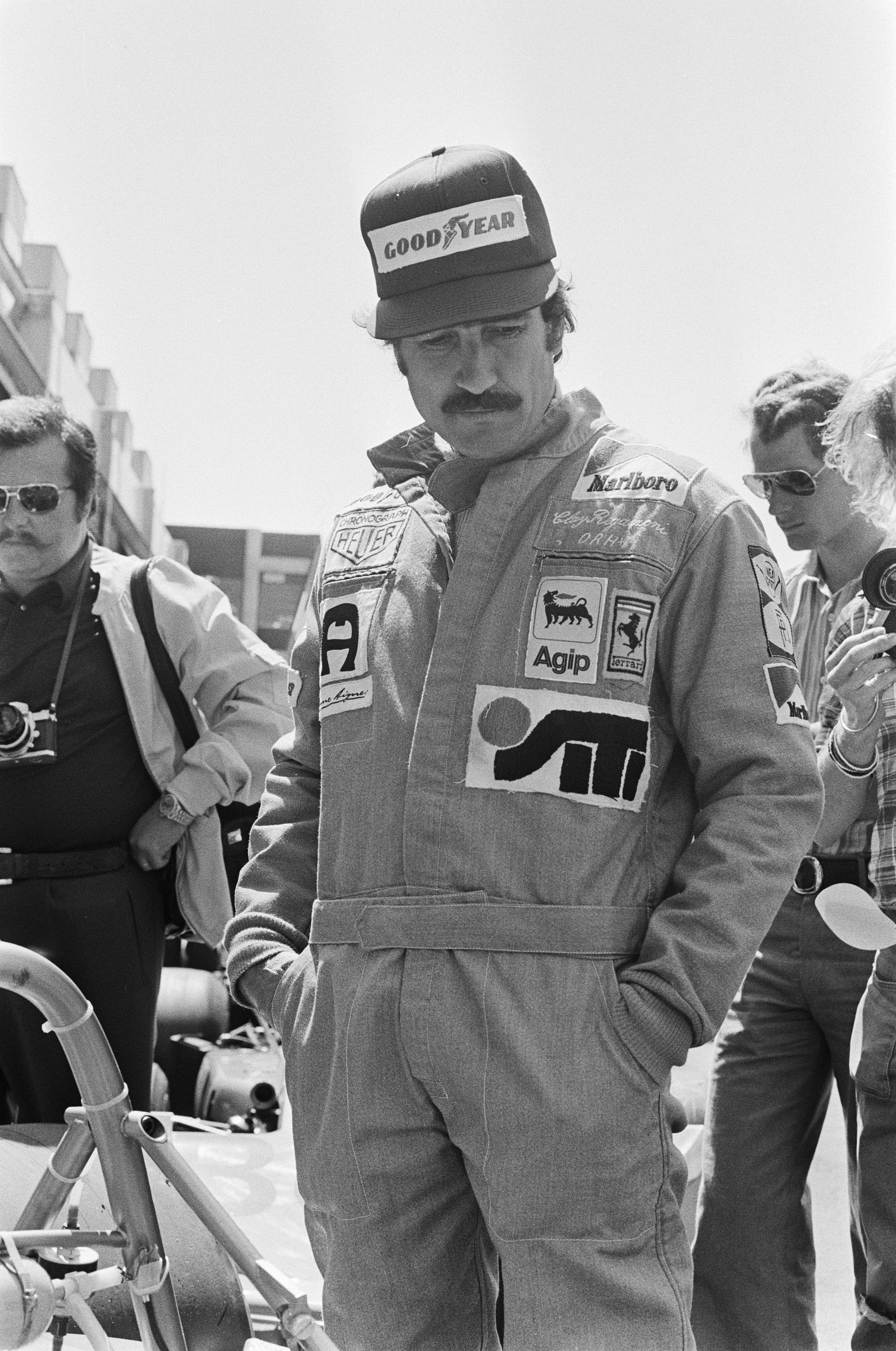
Clay Regazzoni

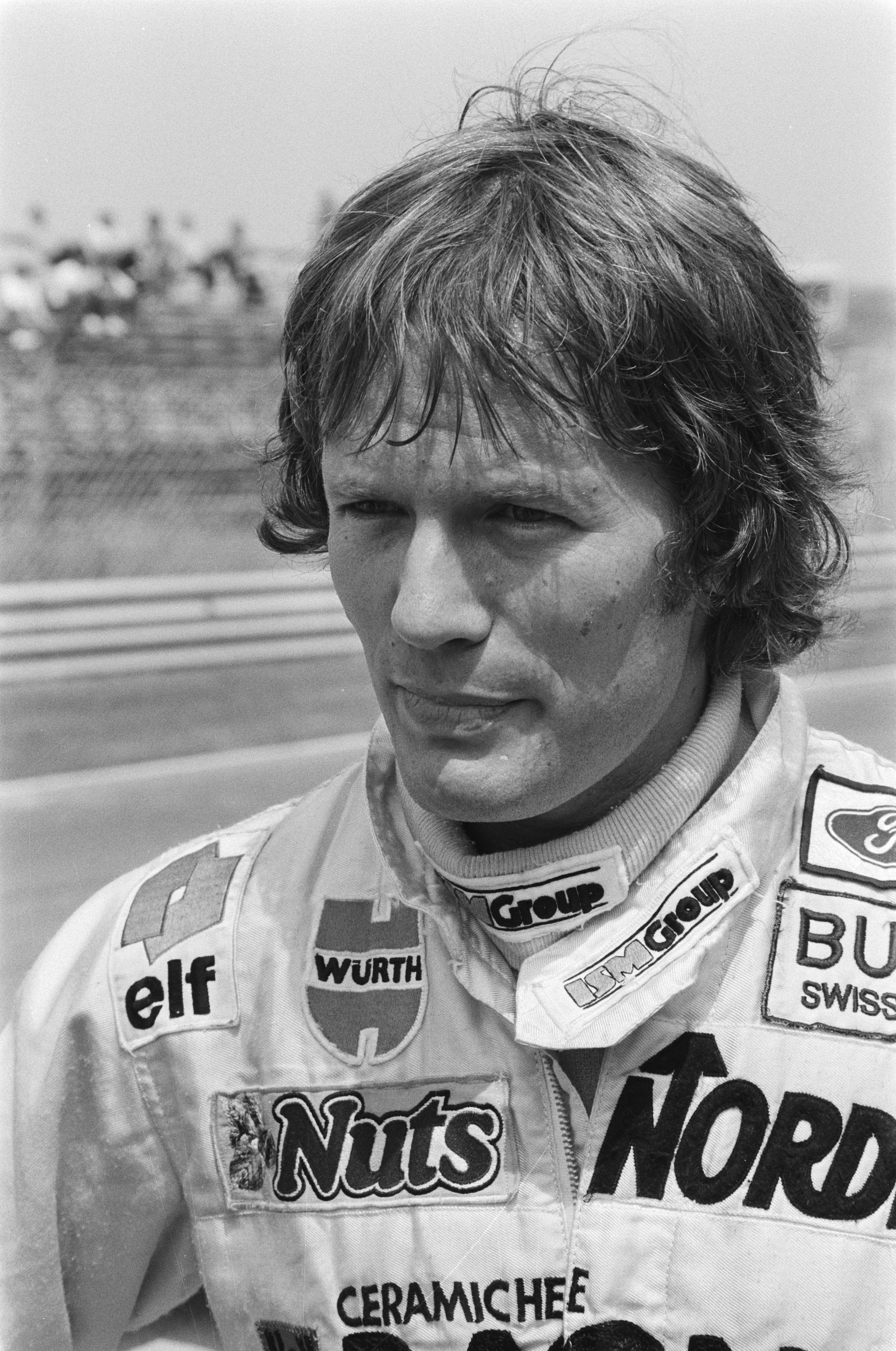
Marc Surer

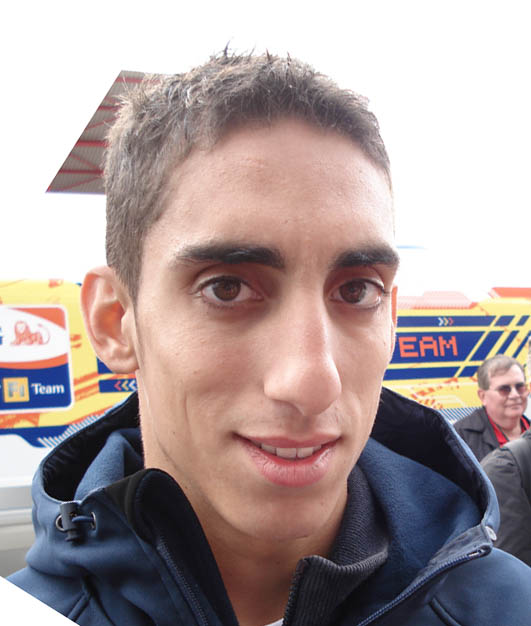
Sébastien Buemi

== Statistics ==
Drivers	Active Years	Entries	Wins	Podiums	Career Points	Poles	Fastest Laps
Toni Branca	1950–1951	3	0	0	0	0	0
Toulo de Graffenried	1950–1954, 1956	23 (22 starts)	0	0	9	0	0
Rudi Fischer	1951–1952	8 (7 starts)	0	2	10	0	0
Peter Hirt	1951–1953	5	0	0	0	0	0
Peter Stæchelin	1951	1 (0 starts)	0	0	0	0	0
Francis Rochat	1951	1 (0 starts)	0	0	0	0	0
Rudolf Schoeller	1952	1	0	0	0	0	0
Alfred Dattner	1952	1 (0 starts)	0	0	0	0	0
Max de Terra	1952–1953	2	0	0	0	0	0
Albert Scherrer	1953	1	0	0	0	0	0
Ottorino Volonterio	1954, 1956–1957	3	0	0	0	0	0
Michael May	1961	3 (2 starts)	0	0	0	0	0
Peter Monteverdi	1961	1 (0 starts)	0	0	0	0	0
Heinz Schiller	1962	1	0	0	0	0	0
Heini Walter	1962	1	0	0	0	0	0
Jo Siffert	1962–1971	100 (96 starts)	2	6	68	2	4
Jean-Claude Rudaz	1964	1 (0 starts)	0	0	0	0	0
Silvio Moser	1966–1971	20 (12 starts)	0	0	3	0	0
Xavier Perrot	1969	1	0	0	0	0	0
Clay Regazzoni	1970–1980	139 (132 starts)	5	28	209 (212)	5	15
Herbert Müller	1971	1 (0 starts)	0	0	0	0	0
Jo Vonlanthen	1975	1	0	0	0	0	0
Loris Kessel	1976–1977	6 (3 starts)	0	0	0	0	0
Marc Surer	1979–1986	88 (82 starts)	0	0	17	0	1
Franco Forini	1987	3 (2 starts)	0	0	0	0	0
Gregor Foitek	1989–1990	22 (7 starts)	0	0	0	0	0
Andrea Chiesa	1992	10 (3 starts)	0	0	0	0	0
Jean-Denis Delétraz	1994–1995	3	0	0	0	0	0
Sébastien Buemi	2009–2011	55	0	0	29	0	0

== See also ==
- List of Formula One Grand Prix winners
