= Peter Hirt =

Swiss racing driver (1910–1992)

- Born: 30 March 1910; Lenzburg, Switzerland
- Died: 28 June 1992 (aged 82); Zürich, Switzerland

Formula One World Championship career
- Nationality: (Switzerland) Swiss
- Active years: 1951 – 1953
- Team(s): Veritas, Ferrari (privateer)
- Entries: 5
- Championships: 0
- Wins: 0
- Podiums: 0
- Career points: 0
- Pole positions: 0
- Fastest laps: 0
- First entry: 1951 Swiss Grand Prix
- Last entry: 1953 Swiss Grand Prix

Peter Hirt (30 March 1910 – 28 June 1992) was a Swiss racing driver. He participated in five World Championship Grands Prix, debuting on 27 May 1951. He scored no championship points.

Hirt was a member of the Écurie Espadon.

== Complete Formula One World Championship results ==
(key)

Year	Entrant	Chassis	Engine	1	2	3	4	5	6	7	8	9	WDC	Pts
1951	Peter Hirt	Veritas Meteor	Veritas 2.0 L6	SUI; Ret	500	BEL	FRA	GBR	GER	ITA	ESP		NC	0
1952	Écurie Espadon	Ferrari 212	Ferrari 166 2.0 V12	SUI; 7	500	BEL	FRA; 11^{†}	GBR; Ret	GER	NED	ITA		NC	0
1953	Écurie Espadon	Ferrari 500	Ferrari 500 2.0 L4	ARG	500	NED	BEL	FRA	GBR	GER	SUI; Ret	ITA	NC	0

^{†} Indicates shared drive with Rudi Fischer
