= 1951 Swiss Grand Prix =

← Previous race	Next race →
- Circuit Bremgarten track layout

Race details
- Date: 27 May 1951
- Official name: XI Großer Preis der Schweiz
- Location: Bremgarten, Bern, Switzerland
- Course: Temporary street/road circuit
- Course length: 7.28 km (4.524 miles)
- Distance: 42 laps, 305.760 km (190.008 miles)
- Weather: Overcast, rain

Pole position
Driver	(Argentina) Juan Manuel Fangio	Alfa Romeo
- Time: 2:35.9

Fastest lap
Driver	(Argentina) Juan Manuel Fangio	Alfa Romeo
- Time: 2:51.1

Podium
First	(Argentina) Juan Manuel Fangio	Alfa Romeo
Second	(Italy) Piero Taruffi	Ferrari
Third	(Italy) Nino Farina	Alfa Romeo

The 1951 Swiss Grand Prix was a Formula One motor race held on 27 May 1951 in Bern. The race was contested over 42 laps of the Bremgarten Circuit with it also being the opening race of the 1951 World Championship of Drivers. The race was the eleventh time that the Swiss Grand Prix was held with all of the races being held at Bremgarten.

After claiming pole position for the race, Argentine driver, Juan Manuel Fangio would go on win the race by 55 seconds over Italian driver, Piero Taruffi who drove for Ferrari. Fellow Italian driver, Nino Farina rounded out the podium in the second Alfa Romeo car.

== Report ==
The Swiss Grand Prix, the first event of the 1951 World Championship due to the absence of Monaco from the calendar, saw the Alfa Romeo team continue their dominance of the previous season. All four of their drivers occupied positions on the front two rows of the grid; the highest non-Alfa qualifier was Ferrari's Luigi Villoresi, who was alongside Fangio and Farina on the front row.

The race took place in the rain, with Fangio initially leading from Farina. Ferrari's Piero Taruffi also challenged for the lead, having started from sixth on the grid. Fangio pitted, handing Nino Farina the lead for the 24th lap of the race. However, Farina's decision not to make a pitstop did not pay off, as Fangio was able to retake the lead on lap 29. Fangio maintained the lead for the remainder of the race, eventually winning by nearly a minute from Taruffi, who had overtaken Farina on the penultimate lap. This was Taruffi's first podium in just his second championship race. The remaining Alfa drivers—Consalvo Sanesi and Toulo de Graffenried—completed the points paying positions, ahead of Ferrari's Alberto Ascari, who competed despite suffering from burns from the previous weekend's Formula 2 race in Genoa. Stirling Moss, driving for HWM, was in seventh, but ran out of fuel on the final lap, therefore yielding the position to Louis Chiron, who was driving a Maserati for Enrico Platé.

== Entries ==
No	Driver	Entrant	Constructor	Chassis	Engine	Tyre
2	(Belgium) Johnny Claes	Ecurie Belge	Talbot-Lago	Talbot-Lago T26C-DA	Talbot 23CV 4.5 L6	D
4	(France) Philippe Étancelin	Philippe Étancelin	Talbot-Lago	Talbot-Lago T26C-DA	Talbot 23CV 4.5 L6	D
6	(France) Yves Giraud-Cabantous	Yves Giraud-Cabantous	Talbot-Lago	Talbot-Lago T26C	Talbot 23CV 4.5 L6	D
8	(France) Louis Rosier	Ecurie Rosier	Talbot-Lago	Talbot-Lago T26C-DA	Talbot 23CV 4.5 L6	D
10	(France) Henri Louveau	Ecurie Rosier	Talbot-Lago	Talbot-Lago T26C	Talbot 23CV 4.5 L6	D
12	(United Kingdom) George Abecassis	HW Motors	HWM-Alta	HWM 51	Alta F2 2.0 L4	D
14	(United Kingdom) Stirling Moss	HW Motors	HWM-Alta	HWM 51	Alta F2 2.0 L4	D
16	(United Kingdom) Peter Whitehead	Scuderia Ferrari	Ferrari	Ferrari 125	Ferrari 125 F1 1.5 V12 s	D
18	(Italy) Luigi Villoresi	Scuderia Ferrari	Ferrari	Ferrari 375	Ferrari Type 375 4.5 V12	P
20	(Italy) Alberto Ascari	Scuderia Ferrari	Ferrari	Ferrari 375	Ferrari Type 375 4.5 V12	P
22	(Italy) Nino Farina	Alfa Romeo SpA	Alfa Romeo	Alfa Romeo 159A	Alfa Romeo 1.5 L8 s	P
24	(Argentina) Juan Manuel Fangio	Alfa Romeo SpA	Alfa Romeo	Alfa Romeo 159A	Alfa Romeo 1.5 L8 s	P
26	(Switzerland) Toulo de Graffenried	Alfa Romeo SpA	Alfa Romeo	Alfa Romeo 159A	Alfa Romeo 1.5 L8 s	P
28	(Italy) Consalvo Sanesi^{1}	Alfa Romeo SpA	Alfa Romeo	Alfa Romeo 159	Alfa Romeo 1.5 L8 s	P
30	(Monaco) Louis Chiron	Enrico Platé	Maserati	Maserati 4CLT-48	Maserati 4 CL 1.5 L4 s	P
32	(United States) Harry Schell	Enrico Platé	Maserati	Maserati 4CLT-48	Maserati 4 CL 1.5 L4 s	P
38	(Switzerland) Rudi Fischer	Ecurie Espadon	Ferrari	Ferrari 212	Ferrari 212 2.5 V12	P
40	(France) Guy Mairesse	Yves Giraud-Cabantous	Talbot-Lago	Talbot-Lago T26C	Talbot 23CV 4.5 L6	D
42	(Argentina) José Froilán González	José Froilán González	Talbot-Lago	Talbot-Lago T26C-GS	Talbot 23CV 4.5 L6	D
44	(Italy) Piero Taruffi	Scuderia Ferrari	Ferrari	Ferrari 375	Ferrari Type 375 4.5 V12	P
46	(Switzerland) Francis Rochat	Francis Rochat	Simca-Gordini	Simca-Gordini T11	Simca-Gordini 16 1.5 L4	E
48	(France) Robert Manzon (Note: Robert Manzon and Maurice Trintignant were co-entered into car 48.)	Equipe Gordini	Simca-Gordini	Simca-Gordini T15	Simca-Gordini 15C 1.5 L4 s	E
48	(France) Maurice Trintignant	Equipe Gordini	Simca-Gordini	Simca-Gordini T15	Simca-Gordini 15C 1.5 L4 s	E
50	(France) André Simon	Equipe Gordini	Simca-Gordini	Simca-Gordini T15	Simca-Gordini 15C 1.5 L4 s	E
52	(Switzerland) Peter Hirt	Peter Hirt	Veritas	Veritas Meteor	Veritas 2.0 L6	?

^1 – Consalvo Sanesi qualified and drove 41 laps of the race in the #28 Alfa Romeo. Gianbattista Guidotti, named substitute driver for the car, was not used at the Grand Prix.

== Classification ==
=== Qualifying ===
Pos	No	Driver	Constructor	Time
1	24	(Argentina) Juan Manuel Fangio	Alfa Romeo	2:35.9
2	22	(Italy) Nino Farina	Alfa Romeo	2:37.8
3	18	(Italy) Luigi Villoresi	Ferrari	2:39.3
4	28	(Italy) Consalvo Sanesi	Alfa Romeo	2:40.3
5	26	(Switzerland) Toulo de Graffenried	Alfa Romeo	2:41.8
6	44	(Italy) Piero Taruffi	Ferrari	2:45.2
7	20	(Italy) Alberto Ascari	Ferrari	2:46.0
8	8	(France) Louis Rosier	Talbot-Lago-Talbot	2:52.7
9	16	(United Kingdom) Peter Whitehead	Ferrari	2:52.9
10	38	(Switzerland) Rudi Fischer	Ferrari	2:54.1
11	10	(France) Henri Louveau	Talbot-Lago-Talbot	2:56.2
12	4	(France) Philippe Étancelin	Talbot-Lago-Talbot	2:57.3
13	42	(Argentina) José Froilán González	Talbot-Lago-Talbot	2:57.3
14	14	(United Kingdom) Stirling Moss	HWM-Alta	2:58.4
15	6	(France) Yves Giraud-Cabantous	Talbot-Lago-Talbot	3:00.3
16	52	(Switzerland) Peter Hirt	Veritas	3:01.6
17	32	(United States) Harry Schell	Maserati	3:02.4
18	2	(Belgium) Johnny Claes	Talbot-Lago-Talbot	3:02.5
19	30	(Monaco) Louis Chiron	Maserati	3:03.8
20	12	(United Kingdom) George Abecassis	HWM-Alta	3:05.1
21	40	(France) Guy Mairesse	Talbot-Lago-Talbot	3:12.0
DNA	34	(Thailand) Prince Bira	Maserati	–
DNA	36	(Switzerland) Toni Branca	Maserati	–
DNA	46	(Switzerland) Francis Rochat	Simca-Gordini	–
DNA	48	(France) Robert Manzon	Simca-Gordini	–
DNA	48	(France) Maurice Trintignant	Simca-Gordini	–
DNA	50	(France) André Simon	Simca-Gordini	–

=== Race ===
Pos	No	Driver	Constructor	Laps	Time/Retired	Grid	Points
1	24	(Argentina) Juan Manuel Fangio	Alfa Romeo	42	2:07:53.64	1	9^{1}
2	44	(Italy) Piero Taruffi	Ferrari	42	+ 55.24	6	6
3	22	(Italy) Nino Farina	Alfa Romeo	42	+ 1:19.31	2	4
4	28	(Italy) Consalvo Sanesi	Alfa Romeo	41	+ 1 Lap	4	3
5	26	(Switzerland) Toulo de Graffenried	Alfa Romeo	40	+ 2 Laps	5	2
6	20	(Italy) Alberto Ascari	Ferrari	40	+ 2 Laps	7	
7	30	(Monaco) Louis Chiron	Maserati	40	+ 2 Laps	19	
8	14	(United Kingdom) Stirling Moss	HWM-Alta	40	+ 2 Laps	14	
9	8	(France) Louis Rosier	Talbot-Lago-Talbot	39	+ 3 Laps	8	
10	4	(France) Philippe Étancelin	Talbot-Lago-Talbot	39	+ 3 Laps	12	
11	38	(Switzerland) Rudi Fischer	Ferrari	39	+ 3 Laps	10	
12	32	(United States) Harry Schell	Maserati	38	+ 4 Laps	17	
13	2	(Belgium) Johnny Claes	Talbot-Lago-Talbot	35	+ 7 Laps	18	
14	40	(France) Guy Mairesse	Talbot-Lago-Talbot	31	+ 11 Laps	21	
Ret	16	(United Kingdom) Peter Whitehead	Ferrari	36	Accident	9	
Ret	10	(France) Henri Louveau	Talbot-Lago-Talbot	30	Accident	11	
Ret	12	(United Kingdom) George Abecassis	HWM-Alta	23	Magneto	20	
Ret	6	(France) Yves Giraud-Cabantous	Talbot-Lago-Talbot	14	Ignition	15	
Ret	18	(Italy) Luigi Villoresi	Ferrari	12	Accident	3	
Ret	42	(Argentina) José Froilán González	Talbot-Lago-Talbot	10	Oil pump	13	
Ret	52	(Switzerland) Peter Hirt	Veritas	0	Fuel System	16	

Notes

- ^1 – Includes 1 point for fastest lap

== Championship standings after the race ==
Drivers' Championship standings

Pos	Driver	Points
1	(Argentina) Juan Manuel Fangio	9
2	(Italy) Piero Taruffi	6
3	(Italy) Nino Farina	4
4	(Italy) Consalvo Sanesi	3
5	(Switzerland) Toulo de Graffenried	2

- Note: Only the top five positions are included. Only the best 4 results counted toward the Championship.

== Notes ==
Previous race: 1950 Italian Grand Prix	FIA Formula One World Championship; 1951 season	Next race: 1951 Indianapolis 500
Previous race: 1950 Swiss Grand Prix	Swiss Grand Prix	Next race: 1952 Swiss Grand Prix
