= Ferrari 212 F1 =

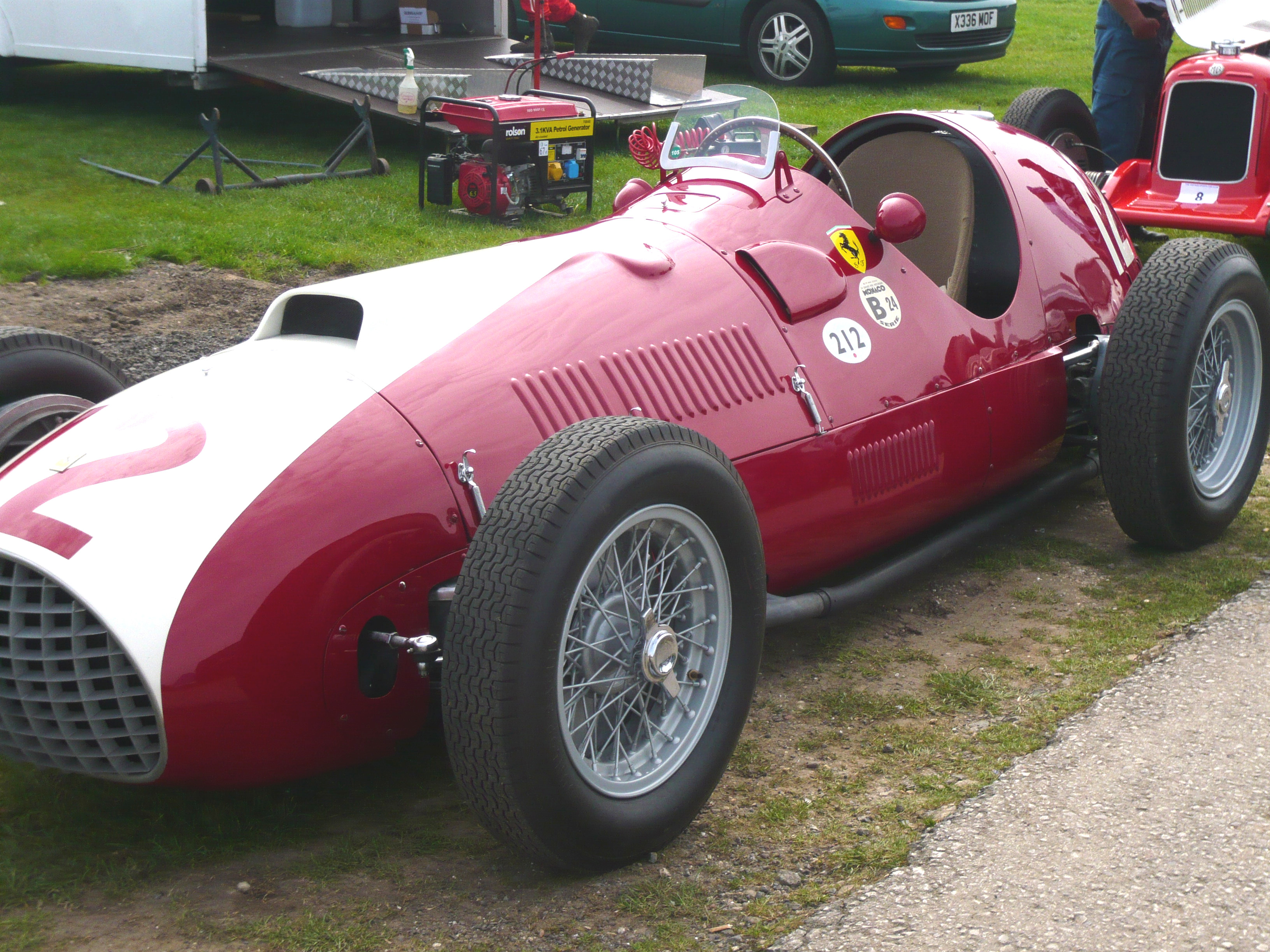
- Category: Formula One / Formula Two
- Constructor: Ferrari
- Designer: Aurelio Lampredi
- Predecessor: 375
- Successor: 500

Technical specifications
- Chassis: Single-seater, tubular frame
- Axle track: Front: 1,255 mm (49.4 in); Rear: 1,200 mm (47 in)
- Wheelbase: 2,320 mm (91 in)
- Engine: Colombo 2,562 cc (156.3 cu in), V12, naturally aspirated, front engine, longitudinally mounted
- Transmission: Ferrari 5-speed manual
- Weight: 700 kg (1,500 lb)
- Tyres: Pirelli

Competition history
- Notable entrants: Ecurie Espadon
- Notable drivers: (Switzerland) Rudi Fischer (Switzerland) Peter Hirt (Switzerland) Rudolf Schoeller (West Germany) Hans Stuck (Switzerland) Max de Terra
- Debut: 1951 Swiss Grand Prix
Races	Wins	Poles	F/Laps
9	0	0	0
- Constructors' Championships: 0
- Drivers' Championships: 0
- Unless otherwise stated, all data refer to Formula One World Championship Grands Prix only.

The Ferrari 212 F1 was a Formula 1 and Formula 2 racing car designed by Aurelio Lampredi for Scuderia Ferrari in 1951.

== Racing history ==
Two 212 F1 chassis were built. One with a De Dion rear axle (chassis 102) and one car with a swing axle (chassis 110). The car was powered by a 2,562.5 cc (156.37 cu in) V12 engine, bore/stroke: 68 mm (2.7 in) × 58.8 mm (2.31 in).

The Ferrari 212 F1 (chassis 102) made its debut at the 1951 Syracuse Grand Prix where it was driven by Dorino Serafini. Serafini finished second behind Ferrari teammate Luigi Villoresi. Two weeks later Serafini was back behind the wheel of the car at Pau. He qualified the car in third place but retired from the race after 49 laps due to steering problems. These are the only two races in which chassis 102 was entered.

Ferrari sold chassis 110 to Swiss driver Rudi Fischer, the leader of Ecurie Espadon. Fischer debuted the car at the non-championship Syracuse Grand Prix. He finished third behind Serafini in the other 212 F1. Fischer finished third at the San Remo Grand Prix and second at the Bordeaux Grand Prix. Fischer made his and the cars' World Championship debut at the 1951 Swiss Grand Prix. After starting tenth he finished the race in eleventh position. Fischer finished sixth at the German Grand Prix, just one position shy of World Championship points. The car was also entered at the Italian Grand Prix but Fischer did not start the race after a crash in practice. Fischer also entered the car in Formula Two races using a Ferrari 166 1995cc V12 engine. He won the Formula Two races at Aix-les-Bains and Angoulême in 1951.

After 1951 the car only appeared as a Formula 2 car as the Formula One World Championship adopted Formula Two regulations for the 1952 and 1953 seasons. For the 1952 season Rudi Fischer bought a Ferrari 500 which he used at all the races he entered. The 212 F1 was now used as a secondary entry. Peter Hirt drove the car at the Swiss Grand Prix. Fischer shared the 212 F1 with Hirt at the French Grand Prix. Fischer was initially due to drive his Ferrari 500, but engine problems in practice meant that he instead participated in the 212 F1. Hirt made his last appearance in the car at the British Grand Prix, where he retired from the race. Rudolf Schoeller drove the car at the Nürburgring but also retired from the race. Hans Stuck was entered at the Italian Grand Prix but he failed to qualify for the race as only 24 cars were allowed to start the race.

The 212 F1 made its final appearance at the 1953 Swiss Grand Prix. Max de Terra drove the car and finished the race in eighth position, 14 laps behind race winner Alberto Ascari.

== Technical specifications ==
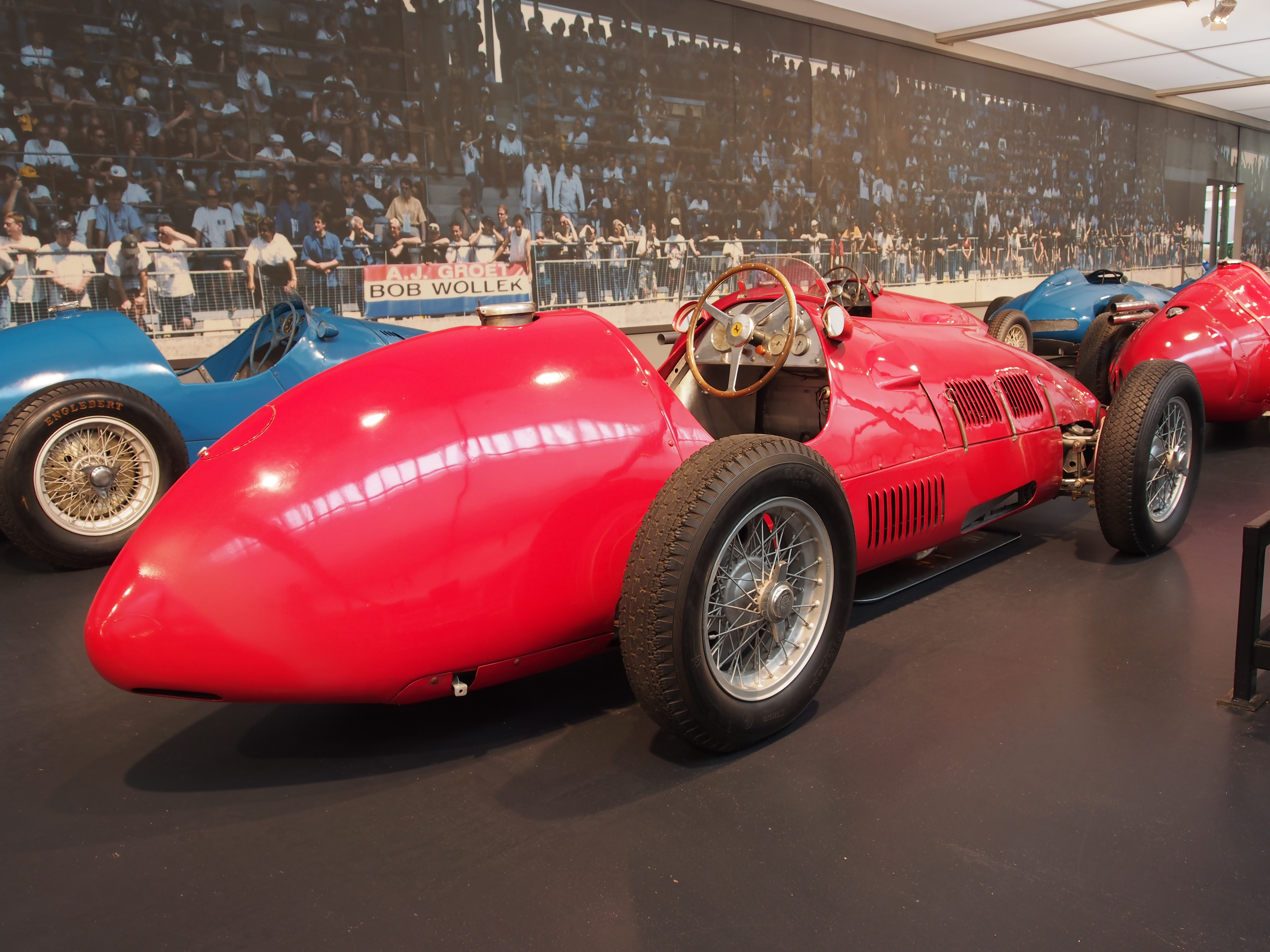
Ferrari 212, here in the F2 version

=== Engine ===
- Name: Ferrari Tipo 212 F1
- Layout: Ferrari 12-cylinder V 60°
- Displacement : 2,562.5 cc (156.37 cu in)
- Bore/stroke: 68 mm (2.7 in) × 58.8 mm (2.31 in)
- Compression: 12.0:1
- Valvetrain: 2 valves / cylinder, SOHC
- Aspiration: Naturally Aspirated
- valve actuation: single overhead camshaft per bank, two valves per cylinder
- fuel feed: 3 Weber 32 DCF carburettors
- Power: 200 hp at 7500 rpm
- BHP/Liter: 78 bhp / liter

=== Drivetrain ===
- Chassis : elliptical-section steel tube chassis
- Front suspension: double wishbones, lower transverse leaf spring
- Rear suspension: DeDion axle, lower longitudinal leaf springs
- Brakes: drums, all-round

Gearbox 5 speed Manual

- Drive: Rear wheel drive

=== Frame ===
- tubular steel
- Wheelbase: 2,320 mm (91 in)
- Front track: 1,255 mm (49.4 in)
- Rear track: 1,200 mm (47 in)
- Weight: 700 kg (1,500 lb)
- Tank: 130 L (34 US gal)

== Complete Formula One World Championship results ==
(key)

Year	Entrant	Engine	Tyres	Driver	1	2	3	4	5	6	7	8	9
1951	Ecurie Espadon	Ferrari 212 2.5 V12	P		SUI	500	BEL	FRA	GBR	GER	ITA	ESP	
1951	Ecurie Espadon	Ferrari 212 2.5 V12	P	(Switzerland) Rudi Fischer	11					6	DNS		
1952	Ecurie Espadon	Ferrari 166 2.0 V12	P		SUI	500	BEL	FRA	GBR	GER	NED	ITA	
1952	Ecurie Espadon	Ferrari 166 2.0 V12	P	(Switzerland) Peter Hirt	7			11	Ret				
1952	Ecurie Espadon	Ferrari 166 2.0 V12	P	(Switzerland) Rudi Fischer				11					
1952	Ecurie Espadon	Ferrari 166 2.0 V12	P	(Switzerland) Rudolf Schoeller						Ret			
1952	Ecurie Espadon	Ferrari 166 2.0 V12	P	(West Germany) Hans Stuck								DNQ	
1953	Ecurie Espadon	Ferrari 166 2.0 V12	P		ARG	500	NED	BEL	FRA	GBR	GER	SUI	ITA
1953	Ecurie Espadon	Ferrari 166 2.0 V12	P	(Switzerland) Max de Terra								8	
