= Società Valdostana Automobili =

Italian racing car constructor

- Founded: 1948; 78 years ago in Pont-Saint-Martin, Aosta Valley, Italy
- Founders: Giovanni Savonuzzi; Virgilio Conrero
- Defunct: 1951

The Societa Valdostana Automobili (SVA), was an Italian automobile manufacturer, active in Pont-Saint-Martin from 1948 to 1951.

== History ==
Founded by Giovanni Savonuzzi and Virgilio Conrero, both originally from Fiat's aviation competitions department, SVA was founded in order to build racing cars.

Despite achieving numerous victories in minor races and gaining the confidence of important drivers such as Giovanni Bracco, SVA ran into severe difficulties after Cisitalia went into receivership. The company changed its focus, resulting in the creation of open-wheel single-seaters.

A first experiment was done with a Formula 3 car with a 500 cc (31 cu in) Moto Guzzi engine. Later a Formula One car was built, with a 1,500 cc (92 cu in) supercharged Fiat-derived engine fueled by a mixture of petrol and alcohol.

The SVA 1500, entrusted to driver Rudi Fischer, took to the track in both the Grand Prix of San Remo and the Swiss Grand Prix in 1950, proving to be powerful and fast, but also very fragile.

SVA closed at the end of 1951.
