= 1953 Swiss Grand Prix =

← Previous race	Next race →
- Circuit Bremgarten track layout

Race details
- Date: 23 August 1953
- Official name: XIII Großer Preis der Schweiz
- Location: Bremgarten, Bern, Switzerland
- Course: Temporary street/road circuit
- Course length: 7.280 km (4.524 miles)
- Distance: 65 laps, 473.200 km (294.033 miles)
- Weather: Sunny, mild, dry

Pole position
Driver	(Argentina) Juan Manuel Fangio	Maserati
- Time: 2:40:1

Fastest lap
Driver	(Italy) Alberto Ascari	Ferrari
- Time: 2:41.3 on lap 50

Podium
First	(Italy) Alberto Ascari	Ferrari
Second	(Italy) Nino Farina	Ferrari
Third	(United Kingdom) Mike Hawthorn	Ferrari

The 1953 Swiss Grand Prix was a Formula Two race held on 23 August 1953 at Bremgarten Circuit. It was race 8 of 9 in the 1953 World Championship of Drivers, which was run to Formula Two rules in 1952 and 1953, rather than the Formula One regulations normally used. World Champion Ferrari driver Alberto Ascari won the race, the last race win and finish of his career.

The race marked the brief return of Grand Prix-era legend Hermann Lang. He was given a chance to participate in Formula 1 racing driving for Officine Alfieri Maserati after one of their team drivers was injured. He raced in two World Drivers' Championship events overall—one in 1953 and one in 1954—and his result here, a fifth-place finish, was his best result.

This race was the last time an Italian driver won a World Championship Grand Prix using Italian Pirelli tyres until Kimi Antonelli won the 2026 Chinese Grand Prix.

== Entries ==
Team	No	Driver	Car	Engine	Tyre
(Belgium) Ecurie Francorchamps	2	(Belgium) Jacques Swaters	Ferrari Tipo 500	Ferrari 500 2.0 L4	E
(Brazil) Escuderia Bandeirantes	4	(Brazil) Chico Landi	Maserati A6GCM	Maserati A6 2.0 L6	P
(France) Equipe Gordini	6	(France) Jean Behra	Gordini Type 16	Gordini 20 2.0 L6	E
(France) Equipe Gordini	8	(France) Maurice Trintignant	Gordini Type 16	Gordini 20 2.0 L6	E
(France) Equipe Gordini	44	(United States) Fred Wacker	Gordini Type 16	Gordini 20 2.0 L6	E
(France) Ecurie Rosier	10	(France) Louis Rosier	Ferrari Tipo 500	Ferrari 500 2.0 L4	E
(Monaco) Louis Chiron	12	(Monaco) Louis Chiron	OSCA 20	OSCA 2000 2.0 L6	P
(United Kingdom) HW Motors	14	(Belgium) Paul Frère	HWM 53	Alta GP 2.5 L4	D
(United Kingdom) HW Motors	16	(United Kingdom) Lance Macklin	HWM 53	Alta GP 2.5 L4	D
(United Kingdom) HW Motors	18	(Switzerland) Albert Scherrer	HWM 53	Alta GP 2.5 L4	D
(United Kingdom) Ken Wharton	20	(United Kingdom) Ken Wharton	Cooper T23	Bristol BS1 2.0 L6	D
(France) Élie Bayol	22	(France) Élie Bayol	OSCA 20	OSCA 2000 2.0 L6	P
(Italy) Scuderia Ferrari	24	(Italy) Nino Farina	Ferrari Tipo 500	Ferrari 500 2.0 L4	P
(Italy) Scuderia Ferrari	26	(United Kingdom) Mike Hawthorn	Ferrari Tipo 500	Ferrari 500 2.0 L4	P
(Italy) Scuderia Ferrari	28	(Italy) Luigi Villoresi	Ferrari Tipo 500	Ferrari 500 2.0 L4	P
(Italy) Scuderia Ferrari	46	(Italy) Alberto Ascari	Ferrari Tipo 500	Ferrari 500 2.0 L4	P
(Italy) Officine Alfieri Maserati	30	(Italy) Felice Bonetto	Maserati A6GCM	Maserati A6 2.0 L6	P
(Italy) Officine Alfieri Maserati	32	(Argentina) Juan Manuel Fangio	Maserati A6GCM	Maserati A6 2.0 L6	P
(Italy) Officine Alfieri Maserati	34	(Germany) Hermann Lang	Maserati A6GCM	Maserati A6 2.0 L6	P
(Italy) Officine Alfieri Maserati	36	(Argentina) Onofre Marimón	Maserati A6GCM	Maserati A6 2.0 L6	P
(Switzerland) Ecurie Espadon	38	(Switzerland) Peter Hirt	Ferrari Tipo 500	Ferrari 500 2.0 L4	P
(Switzerland) Ecurie Espadon	40	(Switzerland) Max de Terra	Ferrari 212 F1	Ferrari 166 2.0 V12	P
(Switzerland) Emmanuel de Graffenried	42	(Switzerland) Toulo de Graffenried	Maserati A6GCM	Maserati A6 2.0 L6	P

== Classification ==
=== Qualifying ===
Pos	No	Driver	Constructor	Time	Gap
1	32	(Argentina) Juan Manuel Fangio	Maserati	2:40.1	—
2	46	(Italy) Alberto Ascari	Ferrari	2:40.7	+ 0.6
3	24	(Italy) Nino Farina	Ferrari	2:42.6	+ 2.5
4	8	(France) Maurice Trintignant	Gordini	2:43.8	+ 3.7
5	36	(Argentina) Onofre Marimón	Maserati	2:44.5	+ 4.4
6	28	(Italy) Luigi Villoresi	Ferrari	2:44.6	+ 4.5
7	26	(United Kingdom) Mike Hawthorn	Ferrari	2:48.1	+ 8.0
8	42	(Switzerland) Toulo de Graffenried	Maserati	2:49.9	+ 9.8
9	20	(United Kingdom) Ken Wharton	Cooper-Bristol	2:51.5	+ 11.4
10	30	(Italy) Felice Bonetto	Maserati	2:52.0	+ 11.9
11	34	(Germany) Hermann Lang	Maserati	2:54.8	+ 14.7
12	6	(France) Jean Behra	Gordini	2:55.0	+ 14.9
13	2	(Belgium) Jacques Swaters	Ferrari	2:55.1	+ 15.0
14	10	(France) Louis Rosier	Ferrari	2:55.4	+ 15.3
15	16	(United Kingdom) Lance Macklin	HWM-Alta	2:57.1	+ 17.0
16	14	(Belgium) Paul Frère	HWM-Alta	2:57.9	+ 17.8
17	38	(Switzerland) Peter Hirt	Ferrari	3:01.5	+ 21.4
18	18	(Switzerland) Albert Scherrer	HWM-Alta	3:07.4	+ 27.3
19	40	(Switzerland) Max de Terra	Ferrari	3:21.1	+ 41.0
20	4	(Brazil) Chico Landi	Maserati	3:29.1	+ 49.0
21	12	(Monaco) Louis Chiron	OSCA	No time	—
22	22	(France) Élie Bayol	OSCA	No time	—
23	44	(United States) Fred Wacker	Gordini	No time	—

=== Race ===
Pos	No	Driver	Constructor	Laps	Time/Retired	Grid	Points
1	46	(Italy) Alberto Ascari	Ferrari	65	3:01:34.40	2	9^{1}
2	24	(Italy) Nino Farina	Ferrari	65	+ 1:12.93	3	6
3	26	(United Kingdom) Mike Hawthorn	Ferrari	65	+ 1:35.96	7	4
4	32	(Argentina) Juan Manuel Fangio (Italy) Felice Bonetto	Maserati	64	+ 1 Lap	1	1.5; 1.5
5	34	(Germany) Hermann Lang	Maserati	62	+ 3 Laps	11	2
6	28	(Italy) Luigi Villoresi	Ferrari	62	+ 3 Laps	6	
7	20	(United Kingdom) Ken Wharton	Cooper-Bristol	62	+ 3 Laps	9	
8	40	(Switzerland) Max de Terra	Ferrari	51	+ 14 Laps	19	
9	18	(Switzerland) Albert Scherrer	HWM-Alta	49	+ 16 Laps	18	
Ret	4	(Brazil) Chico Landi	Maserati	54	Gearbox	20	
Ret	42	(Switzerland) Toulo de Graffenried	Maserati	49	Transmission	8	
Ret	36	(Argentina) Onofre Marimón	Maserati	46	Engine	5	
Ret	8	(France) Maurice Trintignant	Gordini	43	Axle	4	
Ret	6	(France) Jean Behra	Gordini	37	Oil Pressure	12	
Ret	30	(Italy) Felice Bonetto (Argentina) Juan Manuel Fangio	Maserati	29	Engine	10	
Ret	16	(United Kingdom) Lance Macklin	HWM-Alta	29	Engine	15	
Ret	38	(Switzerland) Peter Hirt	Ferrari	17	Engine	17	
Ret	14	(Belgium) Paul Frère	HWM-Alta	1	Engine	16	
Ret	2	(Belgium) Jacques Swaters	Ferrari	0	Spun Off	13	
Ret	10	(France) Louis Rosier	Ferrari	0	Spun Off	14	
DNS	12	(Monaco) Louis Chiron	OSCA	0	Did not start		
DNS	22	(France) Élie Bayol	OSCA	0	Did not start		
DNS	44	(United States) Fred Wacker	Gordini	0	Did not start		

Notes

- ^1 – Includes 1 point for fastest lap

== Shared drives ==
- (Fangio and Bonetto switched cars)
  - Car #32: Fangio (12 laps) then Bonetto (52 laps). They shared the points for 4th place.
  - Car #30: Bonetto (12 laps) then Fangio (17 laps)

== Championship standings after the race ==
Drivers' Championship standings

Pos	Driver	Points
1	(Italy) Alberto Ascari	34.5 (46.5)
2	(Italy) Nino Farina	24 (26)
3	(Argentina) Juan Manuel Fangio	20.5
4	(United Kingdom) Mike Hawthorn	19 (24)
5	(Argentina) José Froilán González	13.5 (14.5)

- Note: Only the top five positions are included. Only the best 4 results counted towards the Championship. Numbers without parentheses are Championship points; numbers in parentheses are total points scored.

Previous race: 1953 German Grand Prix	FIA Formula One World Championship; 1953 season	Next race: 1953 Italian Grand Prix
Previous race: 1952 Swiss Grand Prix	Swiss Grand Prix	Next race: 1954 Swiss Grand Prix
