= Giovanni Savonuzzi =

Italian automobile designer (1911–1988)

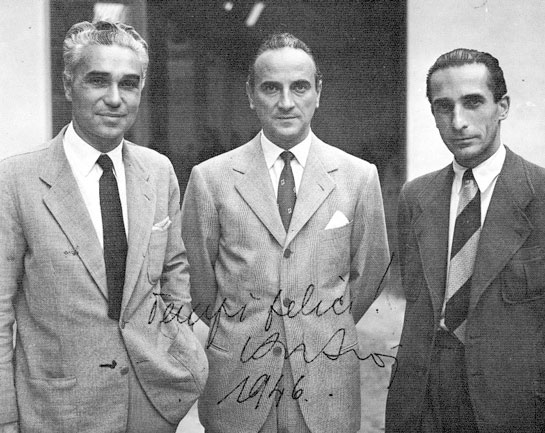
Piero Taruffi, Piero Dusio and Giovanni.

Giovanni Savonuzzi (28 January 1911 – 18 February 1988) was an Italian automobile designer who was born and died in Ferrara.

Savonuzzi received a degree in mechanical engineering from Politecnico di Torino in 1939 and worked for Fiat Aviazione and taught in aeronautics at the politecnico. During World War II he served in Albania. In August 1945 he succeeded Dante Giacosa as technical director of the Cisitalia carmaker, first completing Giacosa's Cisitalia D46 cigarshaped racing car. Before he left for in 1948 due to a disagreement, he had sketched out the Spider Nuvolari and the 202 CMM Aerodinamica Savonuzzi (to be built by Pinin Farina).

He designed the SVA Midget racer while with Società Valdostana Automobili (SVA) 1948–49, lectured at politecnico and had some freelance work, including for Cisitalia in 1951 under Carlo Dusio. He oversaw the production of the Ford-Cisitalia 808 project in 1952.

As the technical director for Carrozzeria Ghia under Luigi Segre from 1953 to 1957, Savonuzzi developed the "Supersonic" series inspired by gas turbines (as a result of his access to wind tunnels at the politecnico). First one-off car was an Alfa Romeo 1900 tuned by Virgilio Conrero for the Mille Miglia race. He then applied this to Fiat 8V (14 chassises), DeSoto Adventurer II, Jaguar XK120 (three chassises) and Aston Martin DB2/4.

Even more futuristic and bold styling saw the 1955 Lincoln Gilda Streamline X (named after Rita Hayworth), and a less radical Ferrari 410 Gilda Superamerica.

From 1957 to 1969 Savonuzzi worked under research director George J. Huebner (1910–96) for the turbine department of Chrysler in Detroit, being chief engineer for automotive research from 1962. The resulting Chrysler Turbine Car 1962–64 were not designed by Savonuzzi, but bodied by Carrozzeria Ghia. He also studied crash-proof cars. Following some time as Director of R&D under Gianni Agnelli at Fiat, he devoted himself to teaching at the politecnico until retirement in 1977.

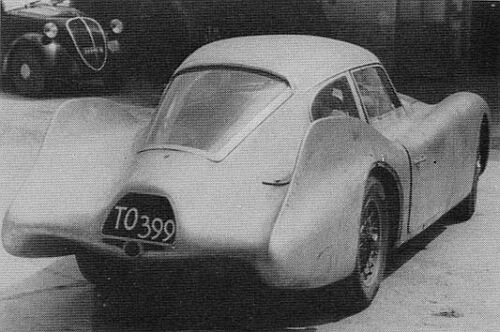
Cisitalia 202 CMM, 1946

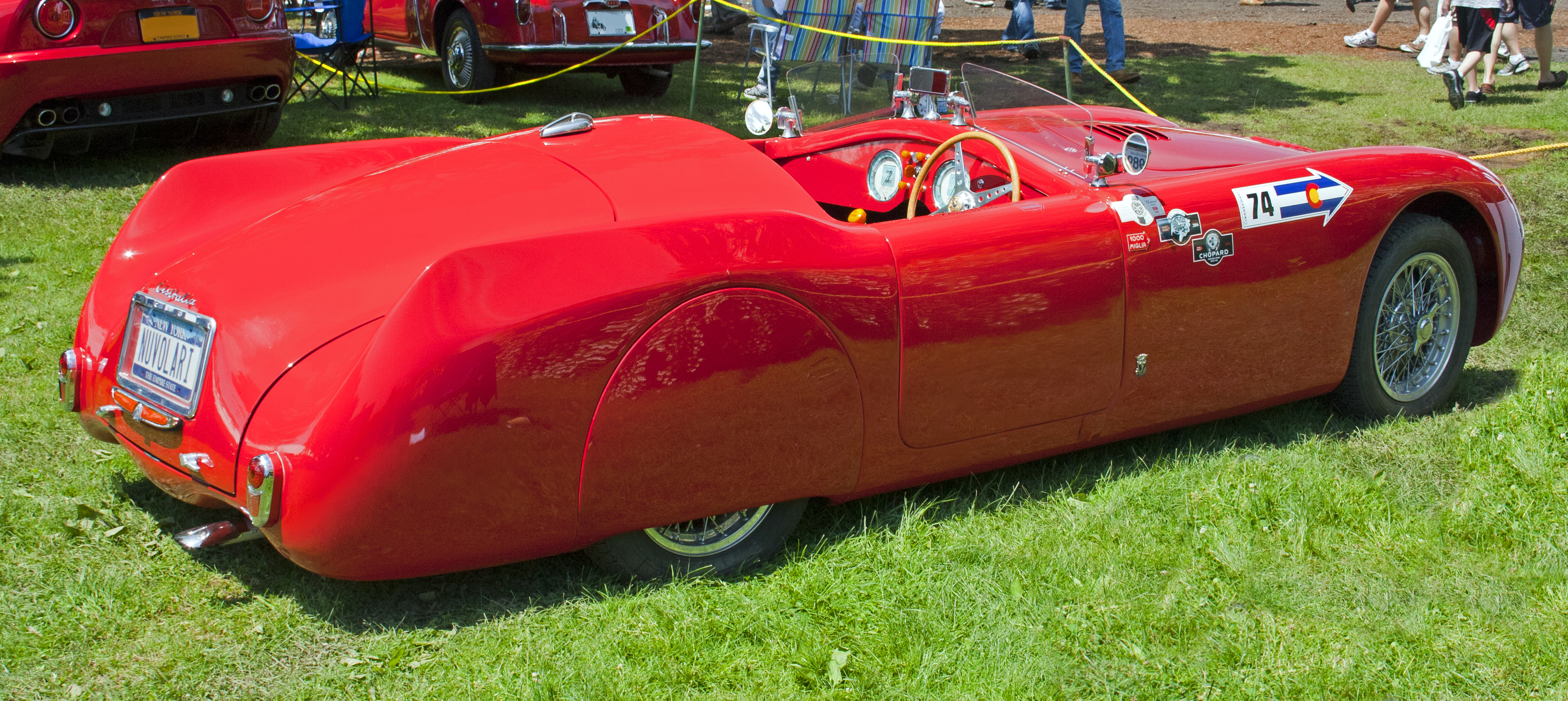
Cisitalia 202SMM Nuvolari, 1949

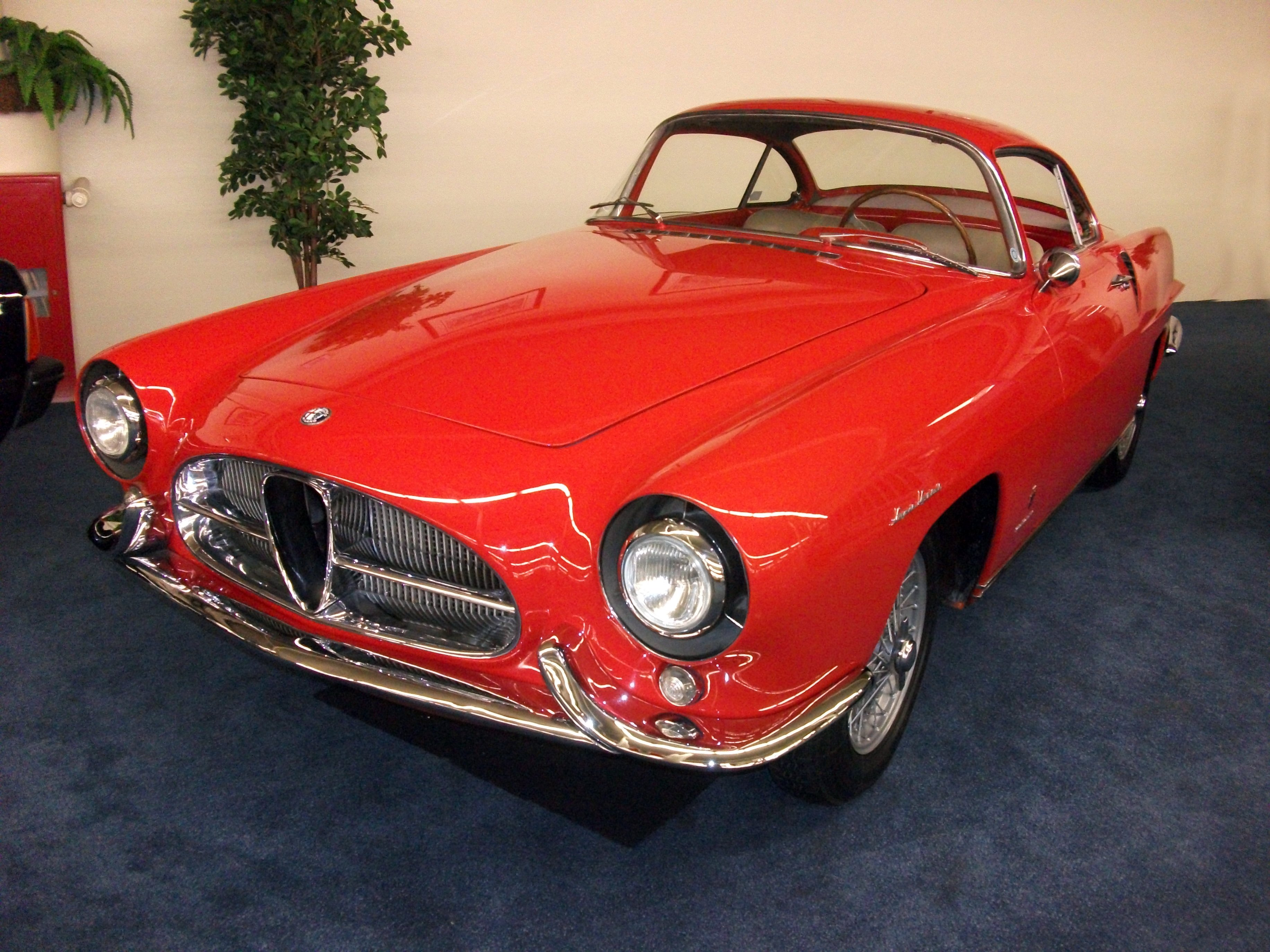
Alfa Romeo 1900 SS, 1953

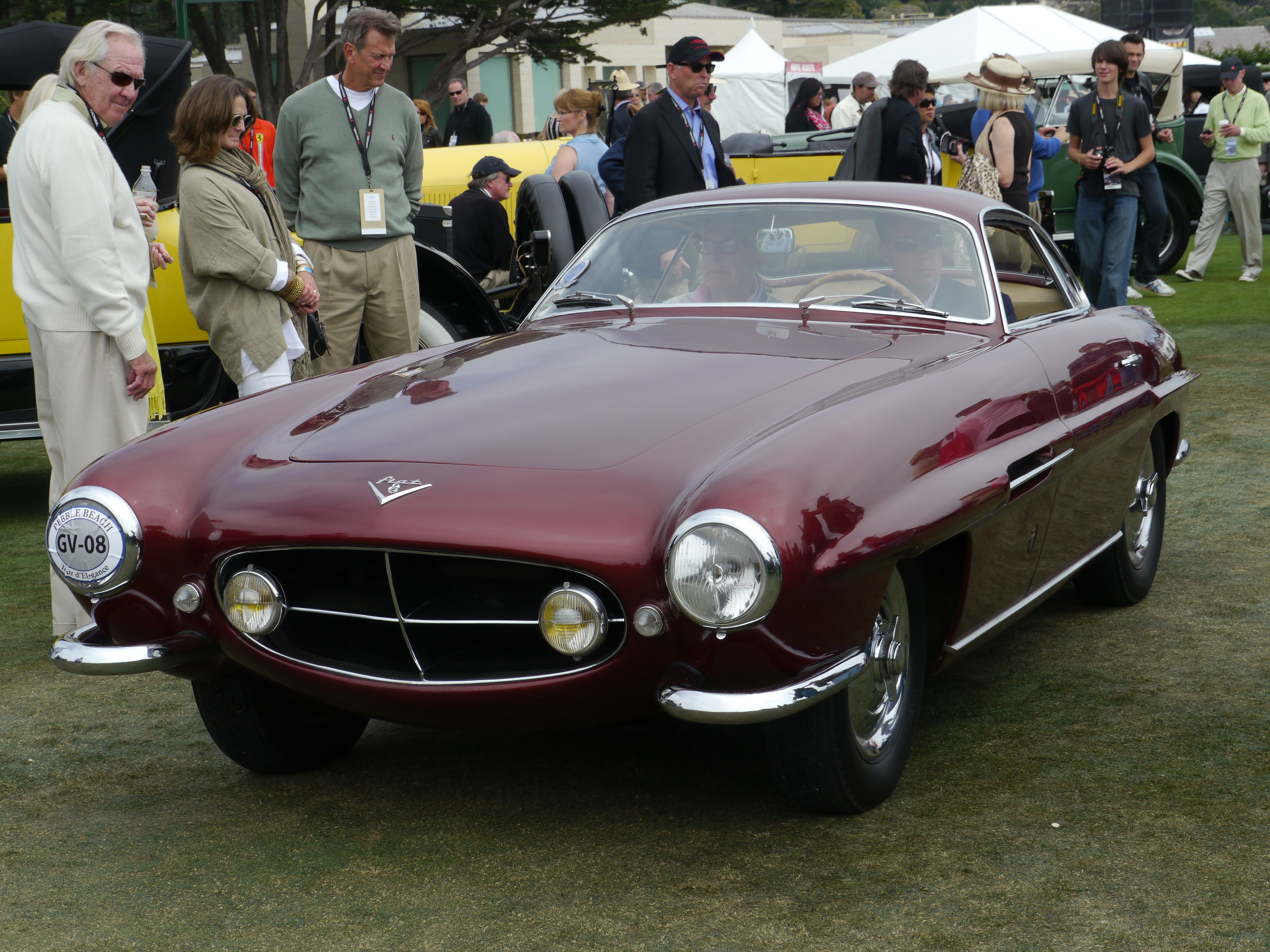
Fiat 8V Supersonic, 1953

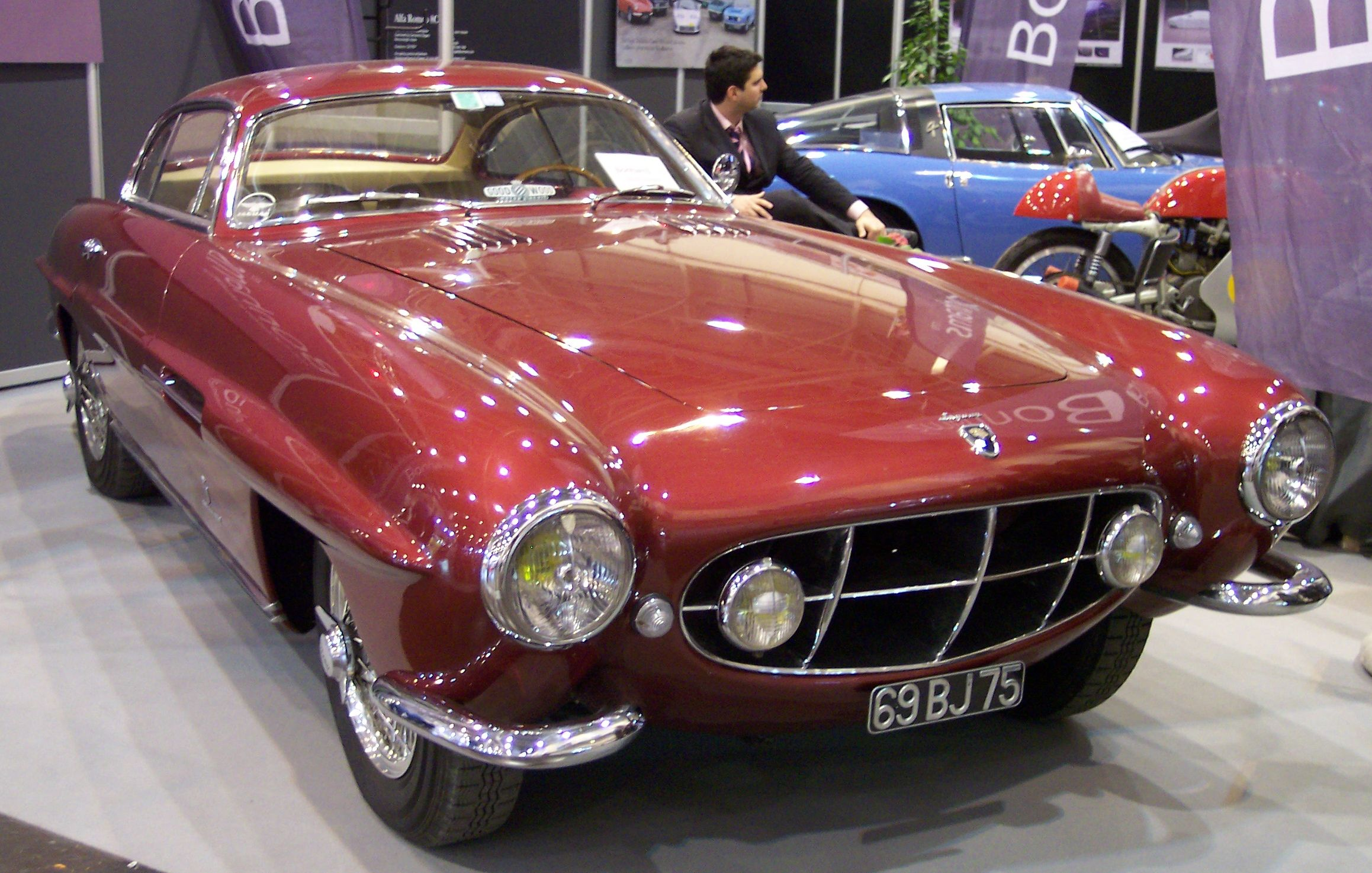
Jaguar XK120 Supersonic, 1954

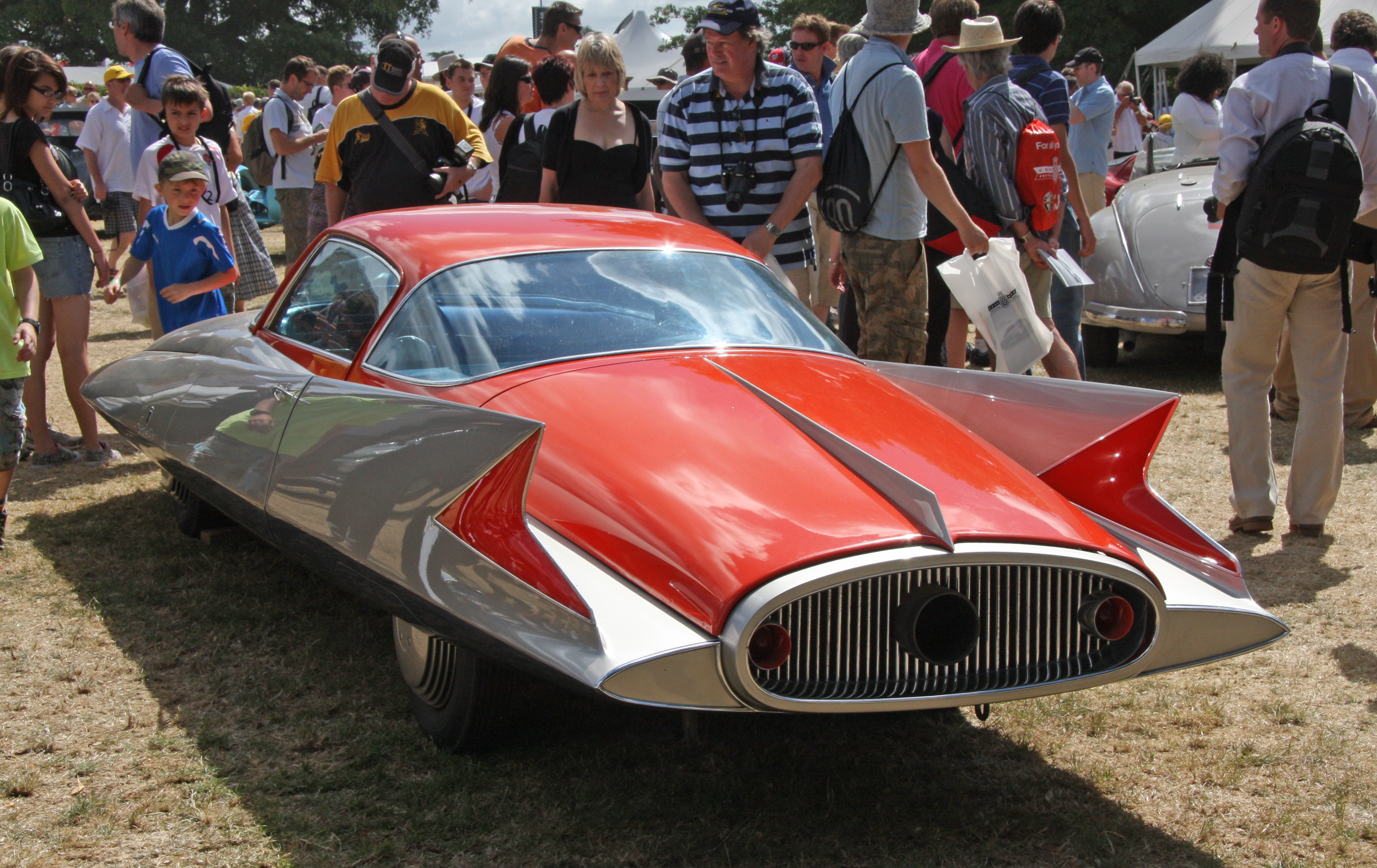
Ghia "Gilda"

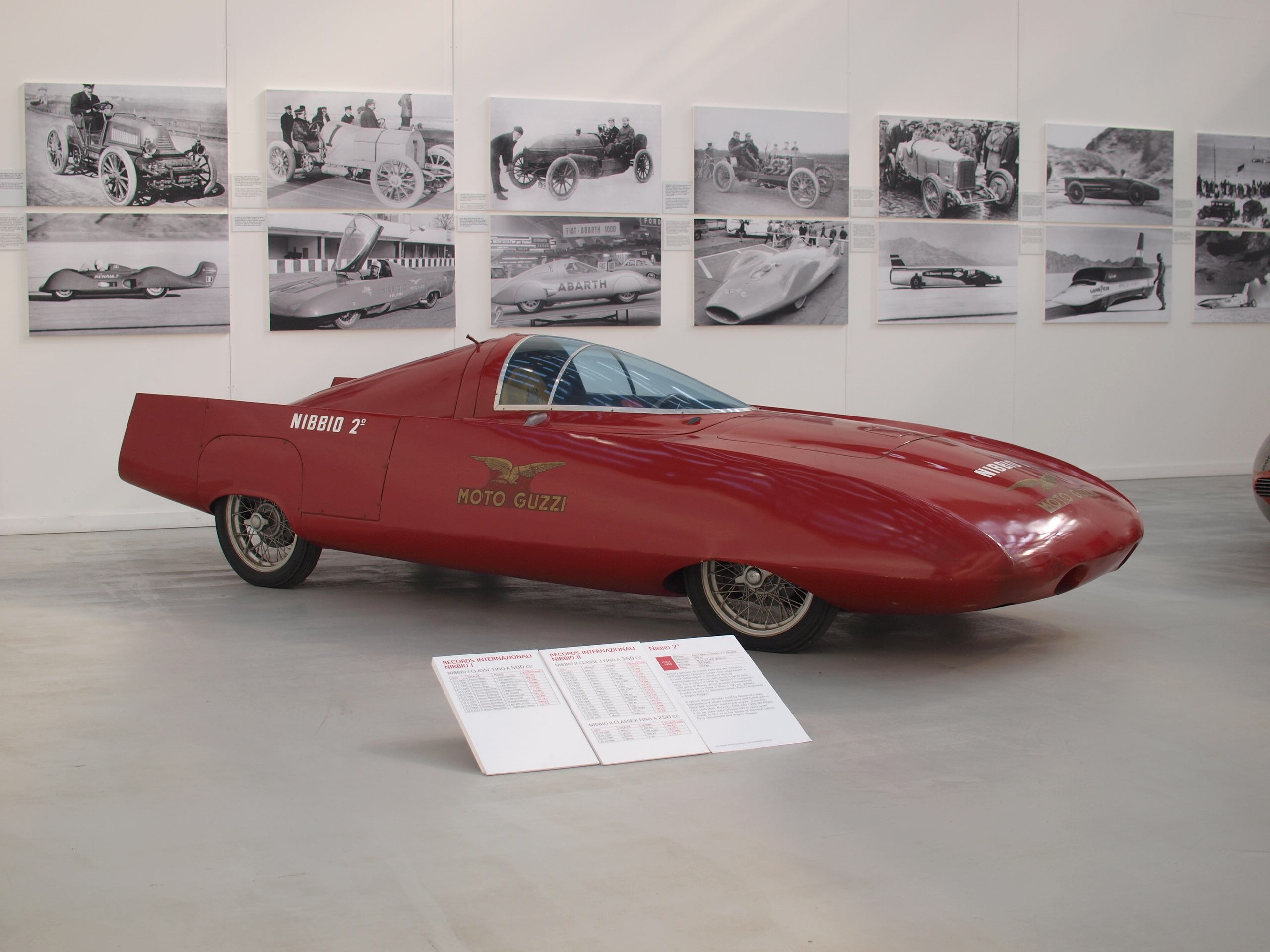
Moto Guzzi Nibbio II, 1956
