= Albert Scherrer =

Swiss racing driver (1908–1986)

- Born: 28 February 1908; Riehen, Switzerland
- Died: 5 July 1986 (aged 78); Basel, Switzerland

Formula One World Championship career
- Nationality: (Switzerland) Swiss
- Active years: 1953
- Team: HWM
- Entries: 1
- Championships: 0
- Wins: 0
- Podiums: 0
- Career points: 0
- Pole positions: 0
- Fastest laps: 0
- First entry: 1953 Swiss Grand Prix

Albert Scherrer (28 February 1908 – 5 July 1986) was a racing driver from Switzerland. He participated in one Formula One World Championship Grand Prix, the 1953 Swiss Grand Prix. He finished 16 laps down and unclassified, scoring no championship points.

== Complete Formula One World Championship results ==
(key)

Year	Entrant	Chassis	Engine	1	2	3	4	5	6	7	8	9	WDC	Points
1953	HW Motors	HWM	Alta Straight-4	ARG	500	NED	BEL	FRA	GBR	GER	SUI; 9	ITA	NC	0
