= Max de Terra =

Swiss racing driver (1918–1982)

- Born: 6 October 1918; Zürich, Switzerland
- Died: 29 December 1982 (aged 64); Zürich, Switzerland

Formula One World Championship career
- Nationality: (Switzerland) Swiss
- Active years: 1952 – 1953
- Team(s): non-works Simca-Gordini, non-works Ferrari
- Entries: 2
- Championships: 0
- Wins: 0
- Podiums: 0
- Career points: 0
- Pole positions: 0
- Fastest laps: 0
- First entry: 1952 Swiss Grand Prix
- Last entry: 1953 Swiss Grand Prix

Max de Terra (6 October 1918 – 29 December 1982) was a Swiss racing driver. He participated in two Formula One World Championship Grands Prix, debuting on 18 May 1952. He scored no championship points.

De Terra was a member of the Ecurie Espadon.

== Complete Formula One World Championship results ==
(key)

Year	Entrant	Chassis	Engine	1	2	3	4	5	6	7	8	9	WDC	Pts
1952	Alfred Dattner	Simca-Gordini 11	Gordini 1500 1.5 L4	SUI; Ret	500	BEL	FRA	GBR	GER	NED	ITA		NC	0
1953	Ecurie Espadon	Ferrari 212	Ferrari 166 2.0 V12	ARG	500	NED	BEL	FRA	GBR	GER	SUI; 8	ITA	NC	0
