= Rudi Fischer =

Swiss racing driver (1912–1976)

- Fischer in 1951
- Born: Rudolf Fischer; 19 April 1912; Stuttgart, Württemberg, German Empire
- Died: 30 December 1976 (aged 64); Lucerne, Switzerland

Formula One World Championship career
- Nationality: (Switzerland) Swiss
- Active years: 1950–1952
- Team(s): Privateer SVA, privateer Ferrari
- Entries: 8 (7 starts)
- Championships: 0
- Wins: 0
- Podiums: 2
- Career points: 10
- Pole positions: 0
- Fastest laps: 0
- First entry: 1950 Swiss Grand Prix
- Last entry: 1952 Italian Grand Prix

Rudolf "Rudi" Fischer (19 April 1912 – 30 December 1976) was a Swiss racing driver, who competed in Formula One at seven Grands Prix from 1951 to 1952. (Note: Fischer was also entered into the 1950 Swiss Grand Prix in a privateer SVA 1500, but did not complete a competitive session.)

Fischer debuted in Formula One at the Swiss Grand Prix in 1951. He achieved two podium finishes, and scored a total of ten championship points. He also participated in numerous non-championship Formula One and Formula Two races.

== Career ==
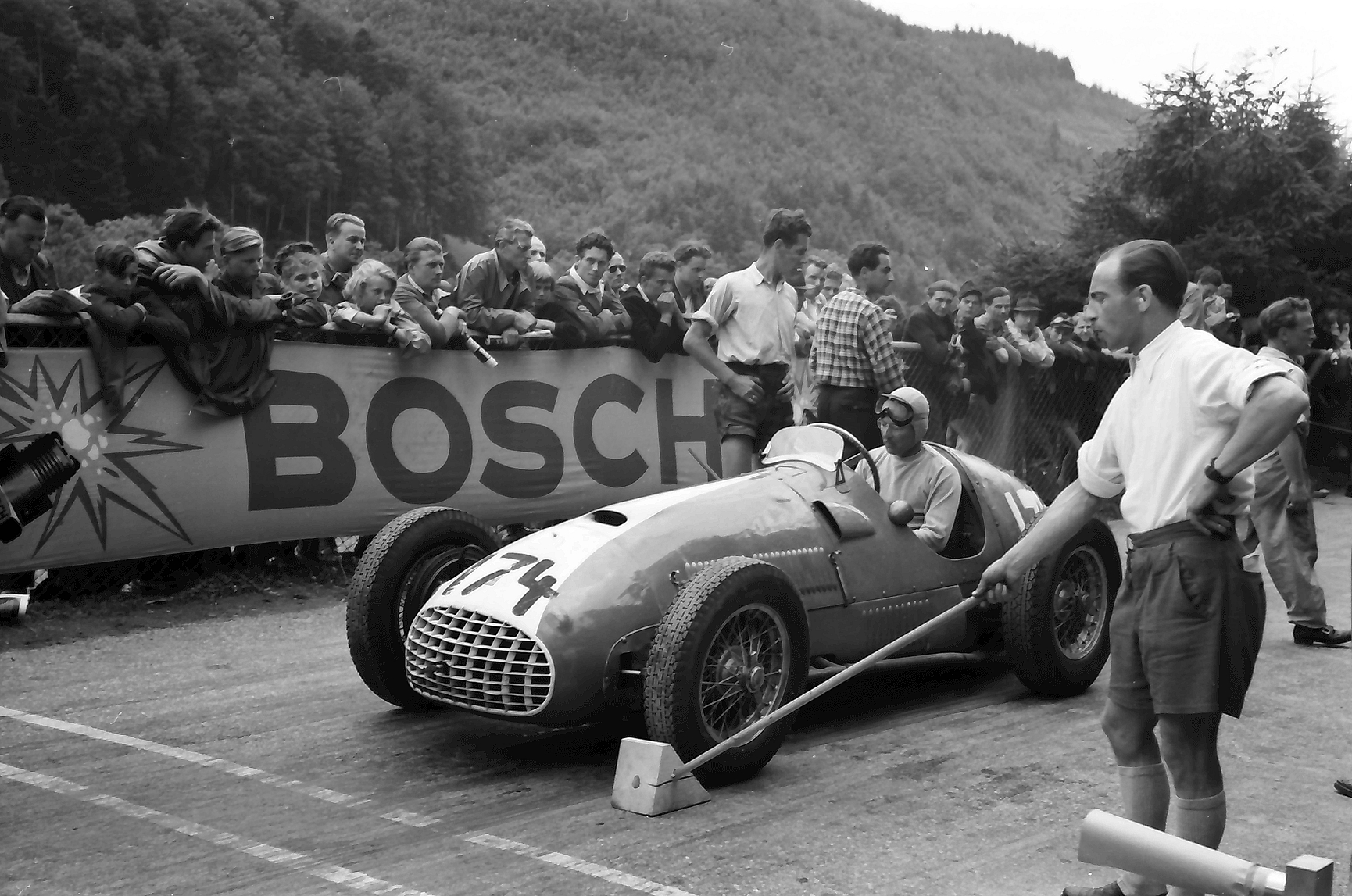
Fischer in Ferrari 500 F2, Schauinsland, 4 August 1951

Fischer finished third in a race which marked the reopening of the AVUS, a German motor racing circuit. It had been closed for a 14-year period and was damaged during World War II. A crowd of 350,000 watched Paul Greifzu of Suhl, Thuringia, win in a car he built himself. Fischer drove a Ferrari to third place over a distance of 207.5 kilometres. His time was 1 hour, 10 minutes, 27.5 seconds. In the 1952 Swiss Grand Prix, in Bern, Fischer finished second to Piero Taruffi; both drivers were in Ferraris.

== Écurie Espadon/Scuderia Espadon ==
Fischer was the leader of the "Écurie Espadon", the entrant name for most of his racing career.

Écurie Espadon was composed of a group of Swiss amateur gentleman racers. The word "Écurie" was used at the beginning as most of the team's cars were French, generally Gordinis. Later the team's equipment changed to Ferraris and other Italian vehicles, thus the name of the team changed to use the equivalent Italian word "Scuderia".

The team was involved in several races all over Europe, as the presentation document described.

The team was composed of:

- Rudolf Fischer: a successful restaurant owner.
- Rudolf Schoeller
- Peter Hirt: a wealthy businessman from Küssnacht, near Zürich, involved in precision tool manufacturing.
- Peter (Pierre) Staechelin from Basel.
- Max de Terra
- Paul Glauser

== Racing record ==
=== Post WWII Grandes Épreuves results ===
(key)

Year	Entrant	Chassis	Engine	1	2	3	4	5
1949	Écurie Espadon	Simca Gordini T11	Simca-Gordini 1.4 L4	GBR	BEL	SUI; 15	FRA	ITA

=== Complete Formula One World Championship results ===
(key)

Year	Entrant	Chassis	Engine	1	2	3	4	5	6	7	8	WDC	Pts
1950	Écurie Espadon	SVA 1500	Fiat 1.5 L4s	GBR	MON	500	SUI; DNA	BEL	FRA	ITA		NC	0
1951	Écurie Espadon	Ferrari 212	Ferrari 212 2.5 V12	SUI; 11	500	BEL	FRA	GBR	GER; 6	ITA; DNS	ESP	NC	0
1952	Écurie Espadon	Ferrari 500	Ferrari 500 2.0 L4	SUI; 2	500	BEL	FRA; DNS	GBR; 13	GER; 3	NED	ITA; Ret	4th	10
1952	Écurie Espadon	Ferrari 212	Ferrari 166 2.0 V12				FRA; 11^{†}					4th	10

^{†} Entered and practiced in his Ferrari 500, but engine failure meant that he reverted to the previous season's 212 model for the race. Drive shared with Peter Hirt.
