= 1950 Swiss Grand Prix =

← Previous race	Next race →
- Circuit Bremgarten track layout

Race details
- Date: 4 June 1950
- Official name: Großer Preis der Schweiz für Automobile
- Location: Bremgarten, Bern, Switzerland
- Course: Temporary street/road circuit
- Course length: 7.28 km (4.524 miles)
- Distance: 42 laps, 305.760 km (190.008 miles)
- Weather: Warm, dry and sunny

Pole position
Driver	(Argentina) Juan Manuel Fangio	Alfa Romeo
- Time: 2:42.1

Fastest lap
Driver	(Italy) Nino Farina	Alfa Romeo
- Time: 2:41.6 on lap 8

Podium
First	(Italy) Nino Farina	Alfa Romeo
Second	(Italy) Luigi Fagioli	Alfa Romeo
Third	(France) Louis Rosier	Talbot-Lago-Talbot

The 1950 Swiss Grand Prix, formally titled the Großer Preis der Schweiz für Automobile, was a Formula One motor race held on 4 June 1950 at Bremgarten. It was race four of seven in the 1950 World Championship of Drivers. The 42-lap race was won by Alfa Romeo driver Nino Farina after he started from second position. His teammate Luigi Fagioli finished second and Talbot-Lago driver Louis Rosier came in third.

== Report ==
The fourth round of the Championship took place just three weeks after the series began at Silverstone (with Monaco and Indianapolis having taken place on consecutive weekends). Once again the event proved to be a battle between the Alfa Romeo factory 158s of Giuseppe Farina, Juan Manuel Fangio and Luigi Fagioli and the Scuderia Ferraris of Alberto Ascari, Luigi Villoresi (who had the latest model with de Dion rear suspension, twin overhead camshaft engine and 4-speed gearbox), Raymond Sommer and Peter Whitehead. There were a number of uncompetitive Talbot-Lagos and Maseratis as usual. José Froilán González was out of action as a result of burns he had received after the first lap accident at Monaco Grand Prix. Also out of action as a result of the crash was Maserati factory driver Franco Rol. This was the last race to be entered by pre-war racer Eugène Martin. It was also the first and only World Championship Grand Prix for Nello Pagani, better known for his exploits in Grand Prix motorcycle racing.

In qualifying Fangio and Farina were well clear of Fagioli with Villoresi and Ascari sharing the second row of the 3-2-3 grid. Peter Whitehead, Franco Rol, Reg Parnell and Rudi Fischer failed to qualify. In the race, on the first lap Ascari managed to get among the Alfa Romeos but he quickly slipped back and it was left to the Alfas to battle. Fangio led early on but then Farina went ahead through a faster refuelling stop. Fagioli was unable to keep up and after both Villoresi and Ascari retired. It was left to Prince Bira to run fourth. He had to refuel and so Philippe Étancelin in a Talbot-Lago was able to move into fourth place. Shortly afterwards, factory Talbot-Lago driver Eugène Martin crashed heavily and was seriously hurt when he was thrown from the car. Étancelin later went out with gearbox trouble and so Talbot-Lago factory driver Louis Rosier moved into fourth. He was promoted to third when Fangio retired on lap 33 with an electrical problem. Farina became the first driver to win multiples Grands Prix, after winning the inaugural World Championship Grand Prix.

== Entries ==
No	Driver	Entrant	Constructor	Chassis	Engine	Tyre
2	(Italy) Nello Pagani^{1}	Scuderia Achille Varzi	Maserati	Maserati 4CLT/48	Maserati 4CLT 1.5 L4s	P
4	(Belgium) Johnny Claes	Ecurie Belge	Talbot-Lago	Talbot-Lago T26C	Talbot 23CV 4.5 L6	D
6	(France) Yves Giraud-Cabantous	Automobiles Talbot-Darracq	Talbot-Lago	Talbot-Lago T26C-DA	Talbot 23CV 4.5 L6	D
8	(France) Eugène Martin	Automobiles Talbot-Darracq	Talbot-Lago	Talbot-Lago T26C-DA	Talbot 23CV 4.5 L6	D
10	(France) Louis Rosier	Automobiles Talbot-Darracq	Talbot-Lago	Talbot-Lago T26C-DA	Talbot 23CV 4.5 L6	D
12	(Italy) Luigi Fagioli	Alfa Romeo SpA	Alfa Romeo	Alfa Romeo 158	Alfa Romeo 158 1.5 L8s	P
14	(Argentina) Juan Manuel Fangio	Alfa Romeo SpA	Alfa Romeo	Alfa Romeo 158	Alfa Romeo 158 1.5 L8s	P
16	(Italy) Nino Farina	Alfa Romeo SpA	Alfa Romeo	Alfa Romeo 158	Alfa Romeo 158 1.5 L8s	P
18	(Italy) Alberto Ascari	Scuderia Ferrari	Ferrari	Ferrari 125	Ferrari 125 F1 1.5 V12s	P
20	(France) Raymond Sommer	Scuderia Ferrari	Ferrari	Ferrari 166 F2-50	Ferrari 166 F2 2.0 V12	P
22	(Italy) Luigi Villoresi	Scuderia Ferrari	Ferrari	Ferrari 125	Ferrari 125 F1 1.5 V12s	P
24	(United Kingdom) Peter Whitehead	Scuderia Ferrari	Ferrari	Ferrari 125	Ferrari 125 F1 1.5 V12s	P
26	(Monaco) Louis Chiron	Officine Alfieri Maserati	Maserati	Maserati 4CLT/48	Maserati 4CLT 1.5 L4s	P
28	(Italy) Franco Rol	Officine Alfieri Maserati	Maserati	Maserati 4CLT/48	Maserati 4CLT 1.5 L4s	P
30	(Thailand) Prince Bira	Enrico Platé	Maserati	Maserati 4CLT/48	Maserati 4CLT 1.5 L4s	P
32	(Switzerland) Toulo de Graffenried	Enrico Platé	Maserati	Maserati 4CLT/48	Maserati 4CLT 1.5 L4s	P
34	(Italy) Felice Bonetto	Scuderia Milano	Maserati	Maserati 4CLT/50	Maserati 4CLT 1.5 L4s	P
36	(United Kingdom) Reg Parnell	Scuderia Ambrosiana	Maserati	Maserati 4CLT/48	Maserati 4CLT 1.5 L4s	P
38	(Switzerland) Rudi Fischer	Ecurie Espadon	SVA-Fiat	SVA 1500	Fiat L4s	P
40	(Switzerland) Toni Branca	Scuderia Achille Varzi	Maserati	Maserati 4CL	Maserati 4CL 1.5 L4s	P
42	(France) Philippe Étancelin	Philippe Étancelin	Talbot-Lago	Talbot-Lago T26C	Talbot 23CV 4.5 L6	D
44	(United States) Harry Schell	Ecurie Bleue	Talbot-Lago	Talbot-Lago T26C	Talbot 23CV 4.5 L6	D

^1 — Nello Pagani qualified and drove all 39 laps of the race in the #2 Maserati. José Froilán González, named substitute driver for the car, was absent due to injury.

== Classification ==
=== Qualifying ===
Pos	No	Driver	Constructor	Time
1	14	(Argentina) Juan Manuel Fangio	Alfa Romeo	2:42.1
2	16	(Italy) Nino Farina	Alfa Romeo	2:42.8
3	12	(Italy) Luigi Fagioli	Alfa Romeo	2:45.2
4	22	(Italy) Luigi Villoresi	Ferrari	2:46.1
5	18	(Italy) Alberto Ascari	Ferrari	2:46.8
6	42	(France) Philippe Étancelin	Talbot-Lago-Talbot	2:51.1
7	6	(France) Yves Giraud-Cabantous	Talbot-Lago-Talbot	2:52.7
8	30	(Thailand) Prince Bira	Maserati	2:53.2
9	8	(France) Eugène Martin	Talbot-Lago-Talbot	2:53.7
10	10	(France) Louis Rosier	Talbot-Lago-Talbot	2:54.0
11	32	(Switzerland) Toulo de Graffenried	Maserati	2:54.2
12	34	(Italy) Felice Bonetto	Maserati	2:54.6
13	20	(France) Raymond Sommer	Ferrari	2:54.6
14	4	(Belgium) Johnny Claes	Talbot-Lago-Talbot	2:59.0
15	2	(Italy) Nello Pagani	Maserati	3:06.8
16	26	(Monaco) Louis Chiron	Maserati	3:06.8
17	40	(Switzerland) Toni Branca	Maserati	3:10.0
18	44	(United States) Harry Schell	Talbot-Lago-Talbot	3:11.5
DNA	24	(United Kingdom) Peter Whitehead	Ferrari	–
DNA	28	(Italy) Franco Rol	Maserati	–
DNA	36	(United Kingdom) Reg Parnell	Maserati	–
DNA	38	(Switzerland) Rudi Fischer	SVA-Fiat	–

=== Race ===
Pos	No	Driver	Constructor	Laps	Time/Retired	Grid	Points
1	16	(Italy) Nino Farina	Alfa Romeo	42	2:02:53.7	2	9^{1}
2	12	(Italy) Luigi Fagioli	Alfa Romeo	42	+ 0.4	3	6
3	10	(France) Louis Rosier	Talbot-Lago-Talbot	41	+ 1 Lap	10	4
4	30	(Thailand) Prince Bira	Maserati	40	+ 2 Laps	8	3
5	34	(Italy) Felice Bonetto	Maserati	40	+ 2 Laps	12	2
6	32	(Switzerland) Toulo de Graffenried	Maserati	40	+ 2 Laps	11	
7	2	(Italy) Nello Pagani	Maserati	39	+ 3 Laps	15	
8	44	(United States) Harry Schell	Talbot-Lago-Talbot	39	+ 3 Laps	18	
9	26	(Monaco) Louis Chiron	Maserati	39	+ 3 Laps	16	
10	4	(Belgium) Johnny Claes	Talbot-Lago-Talbot	38	+ 4 Laps	14	
11	40	(Switzerland) Toni Branca	Maserati	35	+ 7 Laps	17	
Ret	14	(Argentina) Juan Manuel Fangio	Alfa Romeo	32	Engine	1	
Ret	42	(France) Philippe Étancelin	Talbot-Lago-Talbot	25	Gearbox	6	
Ret	8	(France) Eugène Martin	Talbot-Lago-Talbot	19	Accident	9	
Ret	20	(France) Raymond Sommer	Ferrari	19	Suspension	13	
Ret	22	(Italy) Luigi Villoresi	Ferrari	9	Engine	4	
Ret	18	(Italy) Alberto Ascari	Ferrari	4	Oil Pump	5	
Ret	6	(France) Yves Giraud-Cabantous	Talbot-Lago-Talbot	0	Accident	7	

Notes

- ^1 – Includes 1 point for fastest lap

== Championship standings after the race ==
Drivers' Championship standings

	Pos	Driver	Points
	1	(Italy) Nino Farina	18
2	2	(Italy) Luigi Fagioli	12
1	3	(Argentina) Juan Manuel Fangio	9
1	4	(United States) Johnnie Parsons	9
	5	(Italy) Alberto Ascari	6

- Note: Only the top five positions are listed. Only the best 4 results counted towards the Championship.

Previous race: 1950 Indianapolis 500	FIA Formula One World Championship; 1950 season	Next race: 1950 Belgian Grand Prix
Previous race: 1949 Swiss Grand Prix	Swiss Grand Prix	Next race: 1951 Swiss Grand Prix
