= 1951 Italian Grand Prix =

← Previous race	Next race →
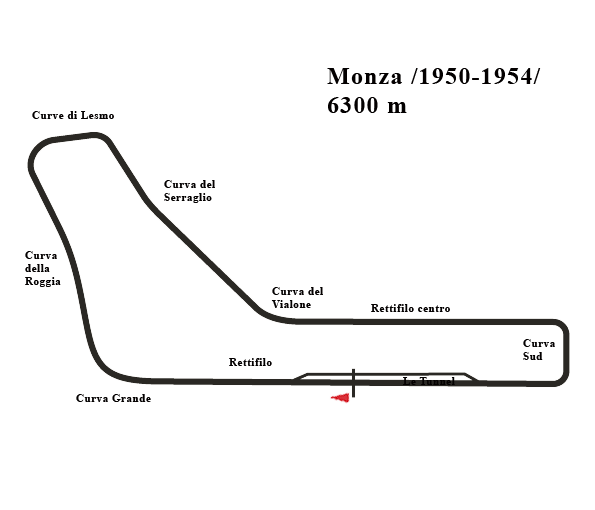

Race details
- Date: 16 September 1951
- Official name: XXII GRAN PREMIO D'ITALIA
- Location: Autodromo Nazionale di Monza, Monza, Italy
- Course: Permanent racing facility
- Course length: 6.300 km (3.915 miles)
- Distance: 80 laps, 504.000 km (313.171 miles)
- Weather: Warm and sunny

Pole position
Driver	(Argentina) Juan Manuel Fangio	Alfa Romeo
- Time: 1:53.2

Fastest lap
Driver	(Italy) Nino Farina	Alfa Romeo
- Time: 1:56.5 on lap 64

Podium
First	(Italy) Alberto Ascari	Ferrari
Second	(Argentina) José Froilán González	Ferrari
Third	(Italy) Felice Bonetto; (Italy) Giuseppe Farina	Alfa Romeo

The 1951 Italian Grand Prix was a Formula One motor race held on 16 September 1951 at Monza. It was race 7 of 8 in the 1951 World Championship of Drivers.

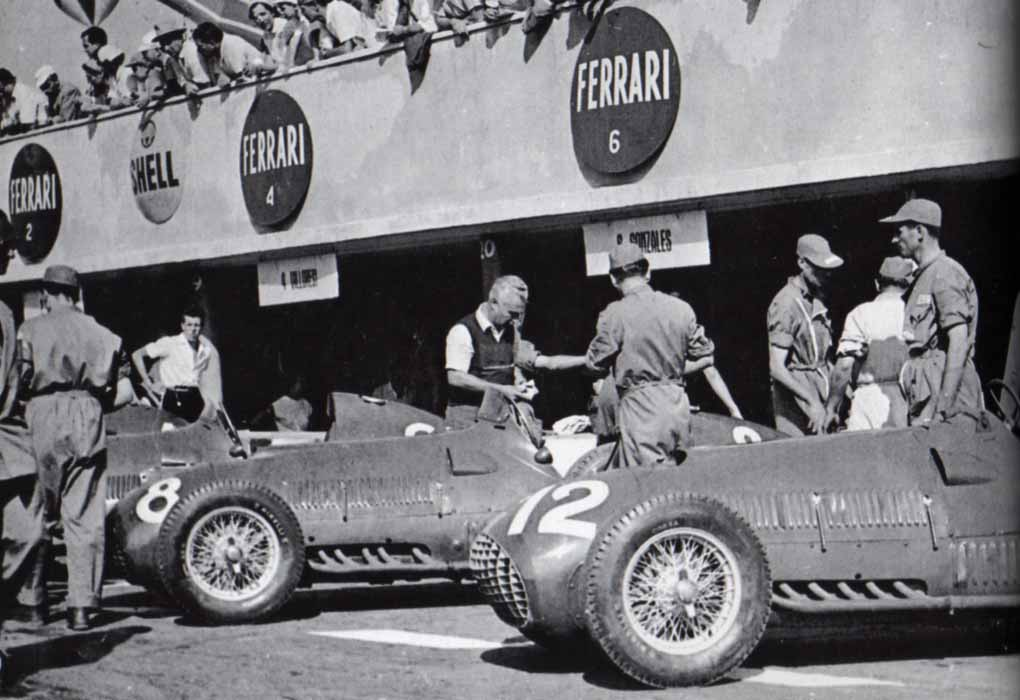
The Ferrari 375 F1s of Chico Landi and Piero Taruffi during the race weekend

== Report ==
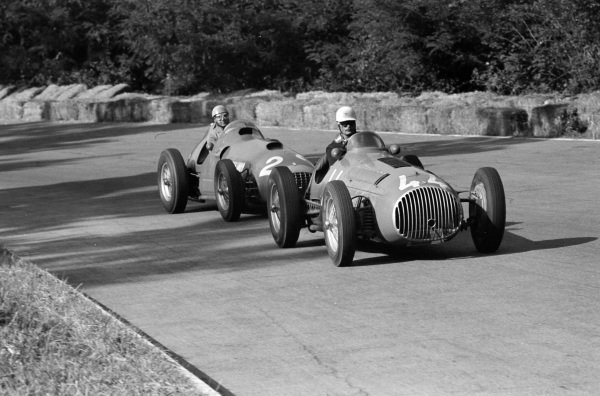
Franco Rol of OSCA Automobili leading Ferrari's Alberto Ascari during the race

Toulo de Graffenried returned to Alfa Romeo's four-car line up, in place of Paul Pietsch, having raced for Enrico Platé in France and Germany. He raced alongside the regular Alfa drivers, Fangio, Farina and Bonetto. The works Ferrari team retained the same four drivers from the race at the Nürburgring — Ascari, Villoresi, González and Taruffi — while Brazilian Chico Landi made his World Championship debut in a privately run Ferrari. The field was completed by works teams from BRM, Simca-Gordini and OSCA, as well as the usual Talbot-Lago entries.

The front row positions on the grid were shared equally between Alfa Romeo and Ferrari, with Fangio, Farina, Ascari and González posting the four fastest qualifying times. The second row consisted of the remaining works Ferraris of Villoresi and Taruffi, alongside Felice Bonetto. Reg Parnell, in a BRM, was also supposed to be on the second row, but was unable to start due to lubrication problems.

Fangio was the initial race leader, having started from pole position, but he soon had to cede the position to Ascari. He retook the lead on lap eight before pitting for a tyre change, which dropped him to fifth. Early retirements for Farina and de Graffenried left José Froilán González in second, behind his teammate Ascari. Fangio attempted to bridge the gap to the Ferraris, but engine problems eliminated his chances. The sole remaining Alfa driver, Nino Farina, who had taken over Bonetto's car on lap 30, inherited third place as a result of Fangio's retirement. He was fast, but fuel leakages meant that he needed to make two further pitstops; he therefore had to settle for third. Alberto Ascari took his second, and Ferrari's third, consecutive Championship race victory, ahead of British Grand Prix winner González. The other works Ferraris of Villoresi and Taruffi completed the points positions in what was another successful race for the Scuderia.

Ascari's victory took him to within two points of Championship leader Fangio, while González was a further four points behind in third.

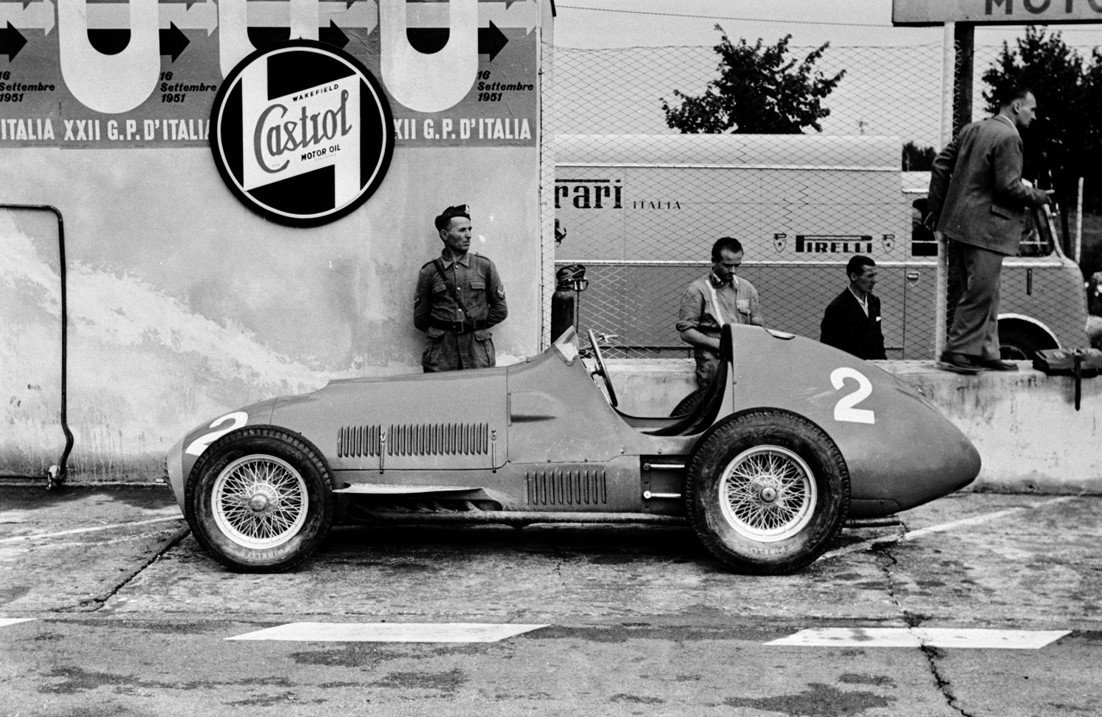
Ascari's winning Ferrari 375 F1 during the race weekend.

== Entries ==
No	Driver	Entrant	Constructor	Chassis	Engine	Tyre
2	(Italy) Alberto Ascari	Scuderia Ferrari	Ferrari	Ferrari 375	Ferrari Type 375 4.5 V12	P
4	(Italy) Luigi Villoresi	Scuderia Ferrari	Ferrari	Ferrari 375	Ferrari Type 375 4.5 V12	P
6	(Argentina) José Froilán González	Scuderia Ferrari	Ferrari	Ferrari 375	Ferrari Type 375 4.5 V12	P
8	(Italy) Piero Taruffi	Scuderia Ferrari	Ferrari	Ferrari 375	Ferrari Type 375 4.5 V12	P
10	(Italy) Gianni Marzotto (Note: Gianni Marzotto withdrew from the event prior to practice)	Scuderia Ferrari	Ferrari	Ferrari 375	Ferrari 375 F1 4.5 V12	P
12	(Brazil) Chico Landi	Francisco Landi	Ferrari	Ferrari 375	Ferrari Type 375 4.5 V12	P
14	(Switzerland) Rudi Fischer	Ecurie Espadon	Ferrari	Ferrari 212	Ferrari 212 2.5 V12	P
16	(United Kingdom) Peter Whitehead	Peter Whitehead	Ferrari	Ferrari 125	Ferrari 125 F1 1.5 V12s	P
18	(France) Louis Rosier	Ecurie Rosier	Talbot-Lago	Talbot-Lago T26C-DA	Talbot 23CV 4.5 L6	D
20	(Monaco) Louis Chiron	Ecurie Rosier	Talbot-Lago	Talbot-Lago T26C	Talbot 23CV 4.5 L6	D
22	(France) Pierre Levegh	Pierre Levegh	Talbot-Lago	Talbot-Lago T26C	Talbot 23CV 4.5 L6	D
24	(France) Yves Giraud-Cabantous	Yves Giraud-Cabantous	Talbot-Lago	Talbot-Lago T26C	Talbot 23CV 4.5 L6	D
26	(Belgium) Johnny Claes	Ecurie Belge	Talbot-Lago	Talbot-Lago T26C-DA	Talbot 23CV 4.5 L6	D
28	(Belgium) Jacques Swaters	Ecurie Belgique	Talbot-Lago	Talbot-Lago T26C	Talbot 23CV 4.5 L6	D
30	(United Kingdom) Reg Parnell	BRM Ltd.	BRM	BRM P15	BRM 15 1.5 V16s	D
32	(United Kingdom) Ken Richardson (Note: Ken Richardson qualified the #32 BRM, although he did not start the race. Hans Stuck was also entered in the same car, but he took no part in either qualifying or the race.)	BRM Ltd.	BRM	BRM P15	BRM 15 1.5 V16s	D
34	(Italy) Nino Farina	Alfa Romeo SpA	Alfa Romeo	Alfa Romeo 159M	Alfa Romeo 1.5 L8s	P
36	(Switzerland) Toulo de Graffenried (Note: Toulo de Graffenried qualified and drove the race in the #36 Alfa Romeo. Consalvo Sanesi was also entered in the car, but injury prevented his participation in the Grand Prix.)	Alfa Romeo SpA	Alfa Romeo	Alfa Romeo 159M	Alfa Romeo 1.5 L8s	P
38	(Argentina) Juan Manuel Fangio	Alfa Romeo SpA	Alfa Romeo	Alfa Romeo 159M	Alfa Romeo 1.5 L8s	P
40	(Italy) Felice Bonetto (Note: Felice Bonetto qualified and drove 29 laps of the race in the #40 Alfa Romeo. Nino Farina, whose own vehicle had already retired, took over the car for a further 50 laps. Points for 3rd position were shared between the drivers (Farina received 1 extra point for setting the fastest race lap).)	Alfa Romeo SpA	Alfa Romeo	Alfa Romeo 159A	Alfa Romeo 1.5 L8s	P
44	(Italy) Franco Rol	OSCA Automobili	OSCA	OSCA 4500G	OSCA 4.5 V12	P
46	(France) Robert Manzon	Equipe Gordini	Simca-Gordini	Simca-Gordini T15	Simca-Gordini 15C 1.5 L4s	E
48	(France) André Simon	Equipe Gordini	Simca-Gordini	Simca-Gordini T15	Simca-Gordini 15C 1.5 L4s	E
50	(France) Maurice Trintignant (Note: Maurice Trintignant qualified the #50 Simca-Gordini. Behra secretly replaced the unwell Trintignant for the race. Team principal Amédée Gordini did not inform the race organizers about the switch as it would have cut the team's starting fee. Behra even wore his compatriot's helmet to disguise the switch.)	Equipe Gordini	Simca-Gordini	Simca-Gordini T15	Simca-Gordini 15C 1.5 L4s	E

== Classification ==
=== Qualifying ===
Pos	No	Driver	Constructor	Time	Gap
1	38	(Argentina) Juan Manuel Fangio	Alfa Romeo	1:53.2	–
2	34	(Italy) Nino Farina	Alfa Romeo	1:53.9	+ 0.7
3	2	(Italy) Alberto Ascari	Ferrari	1:55.1	+ 1.9
4	6	(Argentina) José Froilán González	Ferrari	1:55.9	+ 2.7
5	4	(Italy) Luigi Villoresi	Ferrari	1:57.9	+ 4.7
6	8	(Italy) Piero Taruffi	Ferrari	1:58.2	+ 5.0
7	40	(Italy) Felice Bonetto	Alfa Romeo	1:58.3	+ 5.1
8	30	(United Kingdom) Reg Parnell	BRM	2:02.2	+ 9.0
9	36	(Switzerland) Toulo de Graffenried	Alfa Romeo	2:05.2	+ 12.0
10	32	(United Kingdom) Ken Richardson	BRM	2:05.6	+ 12.4
11	48	(France) André Simon	Simca-Gordini	2:08.0	+ 14.8
12	50	(France) Maurice Trintignant	Simca-Gordini	2:08.9	+ 15.7
13	46	(France) Robert Manzon	Simca-Gordini	2:09.0	+ 15.8
14	24	(France) Yves Giraud-Cabantous	Talbot-Lago-Talbot	2:09.3	+ 16.1
15	18	(France) Louis Rosier	Talbot-Lago-Talbot	2:10.8	+ 17.6
16	12	(Brazil) Chico Landi	Ferrari	2:11.2	+ 18.0
17	20	(Monaco) Louis Chiron	Talbot-Lago-Talbot	2:12.1	+ 18.9
18	44	(Italy) Franco Rol	OSCA	2:13.4	+ 20.2
19	16	(United Kingdom) Peter Whitehead	Ferrari	2:16.2	+ 23.0
20	22	(France) Pierre Levegh	Talbot-Lago-Talbot	2:16.5	+ 23.3
21	26	(Belgium) Johnny Claes	Talbot-Lago-Talbot	2:18.6	+ 25.4
22	28	(Belgium) Jacques Swaters	Talbot-Lago-Talbot	2:18.8	+ 25.6
23	14	(Switzerland) Rudi Fischer	Ferrari	No time	–
24	32	(West Germany) Hans Stuck	BRM	No time	–

=== Race ===
Pos	No	Driver	Constructor	Laps	Time/retired	Grid	Points
1	2	(Italy) Alberto Ascari	Ferrari	80	2:42:39.3	3	8
2	6	(Argentina) José Froilán González	Ferrari	80	+24.6	4	6
3	40	(Italy) Felice Bonetto	Alfa Romeo	79	+1 lap	7	2
3	40	(Italy) Nino Farina	Alfa Romeo	79	+1 lap	7	3^{1}
4	4	(Italy) Luigi Villoresi	Ferrari	79	+1 lap	5	3
5	8	(Italy) Piero Taruffi	Ferrari	78	+2 laps	6	2
6	48	(France) André Simon	Simca-Gordini	74	+6 laps	11	
7	18	(France) Louis Rosier	Talbot-Lago-Talbot	73	+7 laps	15	
8	24	(France) Yves Giraud-Cabantous	Talbot-Lago-Talbot	72	+8 laps	14	
9	44	(Italy) Franco Rol	OSCA	67	+13 laps	18	
Ret	38	(Argentina) Juan Manuel Fangio	Alfa Romeo	39	Engine	1	
Ret	50	(France) Jean Behra	Simca-Gordini	29	Engine	12	
Ret	46	(France) Robert Manzon	Simca-Gordini	29	Engine	13	
Ret	20	(Monaco) Louis Chiron	Talbot-Lago-Talbot	23	Ignition	17	
Ret	22	(France) Pierre Levegh	Talbot-Lago-Talbot	9	Engine	20	
Ret	28	(Belgium) Jacques Swaters	Talbot-Lago-Talbot	7	Overheating	22	
Ret	34	(Italy) Nino Farina	Alfa Romeo	6	Engine	2	
Ret	26	(Belgium) Johnny Claes	Talbot-Lago-Talbot	4	Oil pump	21	
Ret	36	(Switzerland) Toulo de Graffenried	Alfa Romeo	1	Compressor	9	
Ret	16	(United Kingdom) Peter Whitehead	Ferrari	1	Magneto	19	
Ret	12	(Brazil) Chico Landi	Ferrari	0	Transmission	16	
DNS	30	(United Kingdom) Reg Parnell	BRM	0	Non Starter	8	
DNS	32	(United Kingdom) Ken Richardson	BRM	0	Non Starter	10	
DNS	14	(Switzerland) Rudi Fischer	Ferrari	0	Non Starter		
DNS	32	(West Germany) Hans Stuck	BRM	0	Reserve Driver		
DNS	50	(France) Maurice Trintignant	Simca-Gordini	0	Driver Unwell		

Notes

- ^1 – Includes 1 point for fastest lap

== Championship standings after the race ==
Drivers' Championship standings

Pos	Driver	Points
1	(Argentina) Juan Manuel Fangio	27 (28)
2	(Italy) Alberto Ascari	25
3	(Argentina) José Froilán González	21
4	(Italy) Nino Farina	17 (18)
5	(Italy) Luigi Villoresi	15 (18)

- Note: Only the top five positions are listed. Only the best 4 results counted towards the Championship. Numbers without parentheses are Championship points; numbers in parentheses are total points scored.

== Notes ==
Previous race: 1951 German Grand Prix	FIA Formula One World Championship; 1951 season	Next race: 1951 Spanish Grand Prix
Previous race: 1950 Italian Grand Prix	Italian Grand Prix	Next race: 1952 Italian Grand Prix
