= Rudolf Schoeller =

Swiss racing driver (1902–1978)

- Born: 27 April 1902; Düren, Rhine Province, Germany
- Died: 7 March 1978 (aged 75); Grabs, St. Gallen, Switzerland

Formula One World Championship career
- Nationality: (Switzerland) Swiss
- Active years: 1952
- Team: non-works Ferrari
- Entries: 1
- Championships: 0
- Wins: 0
- Podiums: 0
- Career points: 0
- Pole positions: 0
- Fastest laps: 0
- First entry: 1952 German Grand Prix

Rudolf Schoeller (27 April 1902 in Düren, Germany – 7 March 1978 in Grabs) was a racing driver from Switzerland.

== Career ==
Schoeller participated in a single Formula One World Championship Grand Prix, on 3 August 1952. He retired from the race with shock absorber problems, and scored no championship points.

Schoeller was a member of the Ecurie Espadon.

== Complete Formula One World Championship results ==
(key)

Year	Entrant	Chassis	Engine	1	2	3	4	5	6	7	8	WDC	Pts
1952	Ecurie Espadon	Ferrari 212	Ferrari 166 2.0 V12	SUI	500	BEL	FRA	GBR	GER; Ret	NED	ITA	NC	0

== See also ==
- Schoeller family
