= 1951 German Grand Prix =

← Previous race	Next race →

Race details
- Date: 29 July 1951
- Official name: XIV Großer Preis von Deutschland
- Location: Nürburgring; Nürburg, Germany
- Course: Permanent racing facility
- Course length: 22.810 km (14.173 miles)
- Distance: 20 laps, 456.20 km (283.47 miles)
- Weather: Sunny, Mild, Dry

Pole position
Driver	(Italy) Alberto Ascari	Scuderia Ferrari
- Time: 9:55.8

Fastest lap
Driver	(Argentina) Juan Manuel Fangio	Alfa Romeo
- Time: 9:55.8

Podium
First	(Italy) Alberto Ascari	Scuderia Ferrari
Second	(Argentina) Juan Manuel Fangio	Alfa Romeo
Third	(Argentina) José Froilán González	Scuderia Ferrari

The 1951 German Grand Prix was a Formula One motor race held on 29 July 1951 at the Nürburgring Nordschleife. It was race 6 of 8 in the 1951 World Championship of Drivers. The race was won from pole position by Alberto Ascari, ahead of Juan Manuel Fangio and José Froilán González.

== Report ==
As the 1950 German GP was a Formula 2 race, this was the first German Grand Prix held to Formula One regulations. It took place without the German Silver Arrows GP cars that had dominated before the war, and still had quicker lap times than 1950s Formula One, as the 1939 record of 9:43.1 would stand until 1957. Auto Union headquarters were in the communist East Germany, and no other German manufactors showed up. Mercedes had raced old cars in Temporada Argentina Formula Libre races in February, decided not to bring back the pre-war Mercedes-Benz W165, and instead studied a new Mercedes-Benz W195. This was cancelled after the German Grand Prix, and the Mercedes-Benz W196 was built to new 1954 rules. One German driver took part, Paul Pietsch, who had led the 1939 German Grand Prix before finishing 3rd.

Alfa Romeo once again fielded four cars, with Paul Pietsch replacing Consalvo Sanesi, joining Fangio, Farina and Bonetto. Following on from their maiden victory at Silverstone, Ferrari also entered four drivers. Piero Taruffi rejoined their lineup, alongside Ascari, Villoresi and British Grand Prix winner José Froilán González. Ferrari continued their good form from the previous event, with Ascari and González the fastest two qualifiers. Fangio and Farina completed the front row, with Villoresi, Taruffi and Pietsch making up the second row.

Nino Farina initially took the lead, but, by the end of the first lap, had been passed by Fangio, Ascari and González. Paul Pietsch was running in fifth, but ended up at the back of the field after going off on the second lap. When Farina was forced to retire due to overheating problems, Fangio was left as the sole Alfa Romeo able to take the fight to the Ferrari drivers. Alberto Ascari took the lead on the fifth lap as a result of Fangio's first pitstop, but Fangio returned to the lead when Ascari took to the pits. As the Alfas required two pitstops, as opposed to just one for the Ferraris, Fangio needed to build a large lead in his second stint if he wanted to retain the lead after his second stop. He was unable to do so, therefore Ascari reclaimed the lead on the fifteenth lap of the race. Due to a misbehaving engine and a gearbox with only 3rd and 4th (4th being the highest gear), Fangio was unable to take advantage of an unexpected tyre change for Ascari, meaning that the Italian took his maiden World Championship race victory by over half a minute from Fangio. González completed the podium, with the remaining points positions going to the other works Ferraris of Villoresi and Taruffi.

Ascari's victory took him to second in the Championship standings, ten points adrift of Fangio, who extended his lead from the previous race. After his second consecutive podium, José Froilán González moved up to third in the standings, level on points with Farina and Villoresi.

== Entries ==
No	Driver	Entrant	Constructor	Chassis	Engine	Tyre
71	(Italy) Alberto Ascari	Scuderia Ferrari	Ferrari	Ferrari 375	Ferrari Type 375 4.5 V12	P
72	(Italy) Luigi Villoresi	Scuderia Ferrari	Ferrari	Ferrari 375	Ferrari Type 375 4.5 V12	P
73	(Italy) Piero Taruffi	Scuderia Ferrari	Ferrari	Ferrari 375	Ferrari Type 375 4.5 V12	P
74	(Argentina) José Froilán González	Scuderia Ferrari	Ferrari	Ferrari 375	Ferrari Type 375 4.5 V12	P
75	(Argentina) Juan Manuel Fangio	Alfa Romeo SpA	Alfa Romeo	Alfa Romeo 159B	Alfa Romeo 1.5 L8s	P
76	(Italy) Nino Farina	Alfa Romeo SpA	Alfa Romeo	Alfa Romeo 159B	Alfa Romeo 1.5 L8s	P
77	(Italy) Felice Bonetto	Alfa Romeo SpA	Alfa Romeo	Alfa Romeo 159A	Alfa Romeo 1.5 L8s	P
78	(West Germany) Paul Pietsch	Alfa Romeo SpA	Alfa Romeo	Alfa Romeo 159	Alfa Romeo 1.5 L8s	P
79	(Switzerland) Toulo de Graffenried	Enrico Platé	Maserati	Maserati 4CLT-48	Maserati 4 CL 1.5 L4s	P
80	(West Germany) Paul Pietsch^{1}	Enrico Platé	Maserati	Maserati 4CLT-48	Maserati 4 CL 1.5 L4s	P
81	(France) Maurice Trintignant	Equipe Gordini	Simca-Gordini	Simca-Gordini T15	Simca-Gordini 15C 1.5 L4s	E
82	(France) Robert Manzon	Equipe Gordini	Simca-Gordini	Simca-Gordini T15	Simca-Gordini 15C 1.5 L4s	E
83	(France) André Simon	Equipe Gordini	Simca-Gordini	Simca-Gordini T15	Simca-Gordini 15C 1.5 L4s	E
84	(France) Louis Rosier	Ecurie Rosier	Talbot-Lago	Talbot-Lago T26C-DA	Talbot 23CV 4.5 L6	D
85	(Monaco) Louis Chiron	Ecurie Rosier	Talbot-Lago	Talbot-Lago T26C	Talbot 23CV 4.5 L6	D
86	(France) Philippe Étancelin	Philippe Étancelin	Talbot-Lago	Talbot-Lago T26C-DA	Talbot 23CV 4.5 L6	D
87	(France) Yves Giraud-Cabantous	Yves Giraud-Cabantous	Talbot-Lago	Talbot-Lago T26C	Talbot 23CV 4.5 L6	D
88	(United Kingdom) Duncan Hamilton	Duncan Hamilton	Talbot-Lago	Talbot-Lago T26C	Talbot 23CV 4.5 L6	D
89	(United Kingdom) David Murray	Scuderia Ambrosiana	Maserati	Maserati 4CLT-48	Maserati 4 CL 1.5 L4s	D
90	(France) Pierre Levegh	Pierre Levegh	Talbot-Lago	Talbot-Lago T26C	Talbot 23CV 4.5 L6	D
91	(Switzerland) Rudi Fischer	Ecurie Espadon	Ferrari	Ferrari 212	Ferrari 212 2.5 V12	P
92	(Switzerland) Toni Branca	Antonio Branca	Maserati	Maserati 4CLT-48	Maserati 4 CL 1.5 L4s	P
93	(Belgium) Jacques Swaters	Ecurie Belgique	Talbot-Lago	Talbot-Lago T26C	Talbot 23CV 4.5 L6	D
94	(Belgium) Johnny Claes	Ecurie Belge	Talbot-Lago	Talbot-Lago T26C-DA	Talbot 23CV 4.5 L6	D
95	(Thailand) Prince Bira^{2}	Ecurie Siam	Maserati	Maserati 4CLT-48	Maserati 4 CL 1.5 L4s	P
96	(Sweden) Erik Lundgren^{2}	Erik Lundgren	EL-Ford	EL Special	Ford V8	D
97	(Brazil) Chico Landi^{2}	Escuderia Bandeirantes	Maserati	Maserati 4CLT-48	Maserati 4 CL 1.5 L4s	P

^1 — Paul Pietsch qualified and raced in a different car, the #78 Alfa Romeo.
^2 — Prince Bira, Erik Lundgren and Chico Landi all withdrew from the event prior to practice.

== Classification ==
=== Qualifying ===
Pos	No	Driver	Constructor	Time
1	71	(Italy) Alberto Ascari	Ferrari	9:55.8
2	74	(Argentina) José Froilán González	Ferrari	9:57.5
3	75	(Argentina) Juan Manuel Fangio	Alfa Romeo	9:59.0
4	76	(Italy) Nino Farina	Alfa Romeo	10:01.1
5	72	(Italy) Luigi Villoresi	Ferrari	10:06.6
6	73	(Italy) Piero Taruffi	Ferrari	10:12.9
7	78	(West Germany) Paul Pietsch	Alfa Romeo	10:15.7
8	91	(Switzerland) Rudi Fischer	Ferrari	10:23.8
9	82	(France) Robert Manzon	Simca-Gordini	10:28.9
10	77	(Italy) Felice Bonetto	Alfa Romeo	10:46.1
11	87	(France) Yves Giraud-Cabantous	Talbot-Lago-Talbot	10:52.8
12	83	(France) André Simon	Simca-Gordini	10:57.5
13	85	(Monaco) Louis Chiron	Talbot-Lago-Talbot	11:00.2
14	81	(France) Maurice Trintignant	Simca-Gordini	11:07.5
15	84	(France) Louis Rosier	Talbot-Lago-Talbot	11:08.2
16	79	(Switzerland) Toulo de Graffenried	Maserati	11:25.6
17	92	(Switzerland) Toni Branca	Maserati	11:26.7
18	94	(Belgium) Johnny Claes	Talbot-Lago-Talbot	11:33.9
19	90	(France) Pierre Levegh	Talbot-Lago-Talbot	11:41.9
20	88	(United Kingdom) Duncan Hamilton	Talbot-Lago-Talbot	11:49.3
21	86	(France) Philippe Étancelin	Talbot-Lago-Talbot	11:52.9
22	93	(Belgium) Jacques Swaters	Talbot-Lago-Talbot	12:09.1
23	89	(United Kingdom) David Murray	Maserati	No time

=== Race ===
Pos	No	Driver	Constructor	Laps	Time/retired	Grid	Points
1	71	(Italy) Alberto Ascari	Ferrari	20	3:23:03.3	1	8
2	75	(Argentina) Juan Manuel Fangio	Alfa Romeo	20	+30.5	3	7^{1}
3	74	(Argentina) José Froilán González	Ferrari	20	+4:39.0	2	4
4	72	(Italy) Luigi Villoresi	Ferrari	20	+5:50.2	5	3
5	73	(Italy) Piero Taruffi	Ferrari	20	+7:49.1	6	2
6	91	(Switzerland) Rudi Fischer	Ferrari	19	+1 lap	8	
7	82	(France) Robert Manzon	Simca-Gordini	19	+1 lap	9	
8	84	(France) Louis Rosier	Talbot-Lago-Talbot	19	+1 lap	15	
9	90	(France) Pierre Levegh	Talbot-Lago-Talbot	18	+2 laps	19	
10	93	(Belgium) Jacques Swaters	Talbot-Lago-Talbot	18	+2 laps	22	
11	94	(Belgium) Johnny Claes	Talbot-Lago-Talbot	17	+3 laps	18	
Ret	87	(France) Yves Giraud Cabantous	Talbot-Lago-Talbot	17	Accident	11	
Ret	81	(France) Maurice Trintignant	Simca-Gordini	13	Engine	14	
Ret	77	(Italy) Felice Bonetto	Alfa Romeo	12	Magneto	10	
Ret	88	(United Kingdom) Duncan Hamilton	Talbot-Lago-Talbot	12	Oil pressure	20	
Ret	78	(West Germany) Paul Pietsch	Alfa Romeo	11	Accident	7	
Ret	83	(France) André Simon	Simca-Gordini	11	Engine	12	
Ret	76	(Italy) Nino Farina	Alfa Romeo	8	Overheating	4	
Ret	86	(France) Philippe Étancelin	Talbot-Lago-Talbot	4	Gearbox	21	
Ret	85	(Monaco) Louis Chiron	Talbot-Lago-Talbot	3	Ignition	13	
Ret	92	(Switzerland) Toni Branca	Maserati	3	Engine	17	
Ret	79	(Switzerland) Toulo de Graffenried	Maserati	2	Engine	16	

Notes

- ^1 – Includes 1 point for fastest lap

== Championship standings after the race ==
Drivers' Championship standings

	Pos	Driver	Points
	1	(Argentina) Juan Manuel Fangio	27 (28)
4	2	(Italy) Alberto Ascari	17
1	3	(Argentina) José Froilán González	15
2	4	(Italy) Nino Farina	15
2	5	(Italy) Luigi Villoresi	15

- Note: Only the top five positions are listed. Only the best 4 results counted towards the Championship. Numbers without parentheses are Championship points; numbers in parentheses are total points scored.

Previous race: 1951 British Grand Prix	FIA Formula One World Championship; 1951 season	Next race: 1951 Italian Grand Prix
Previous race: 1950 German Grand Prix	German Grand Prix	Next race: 1952 German Grand Prix
