= Jean Behra =

French racing driver (1921–1959)

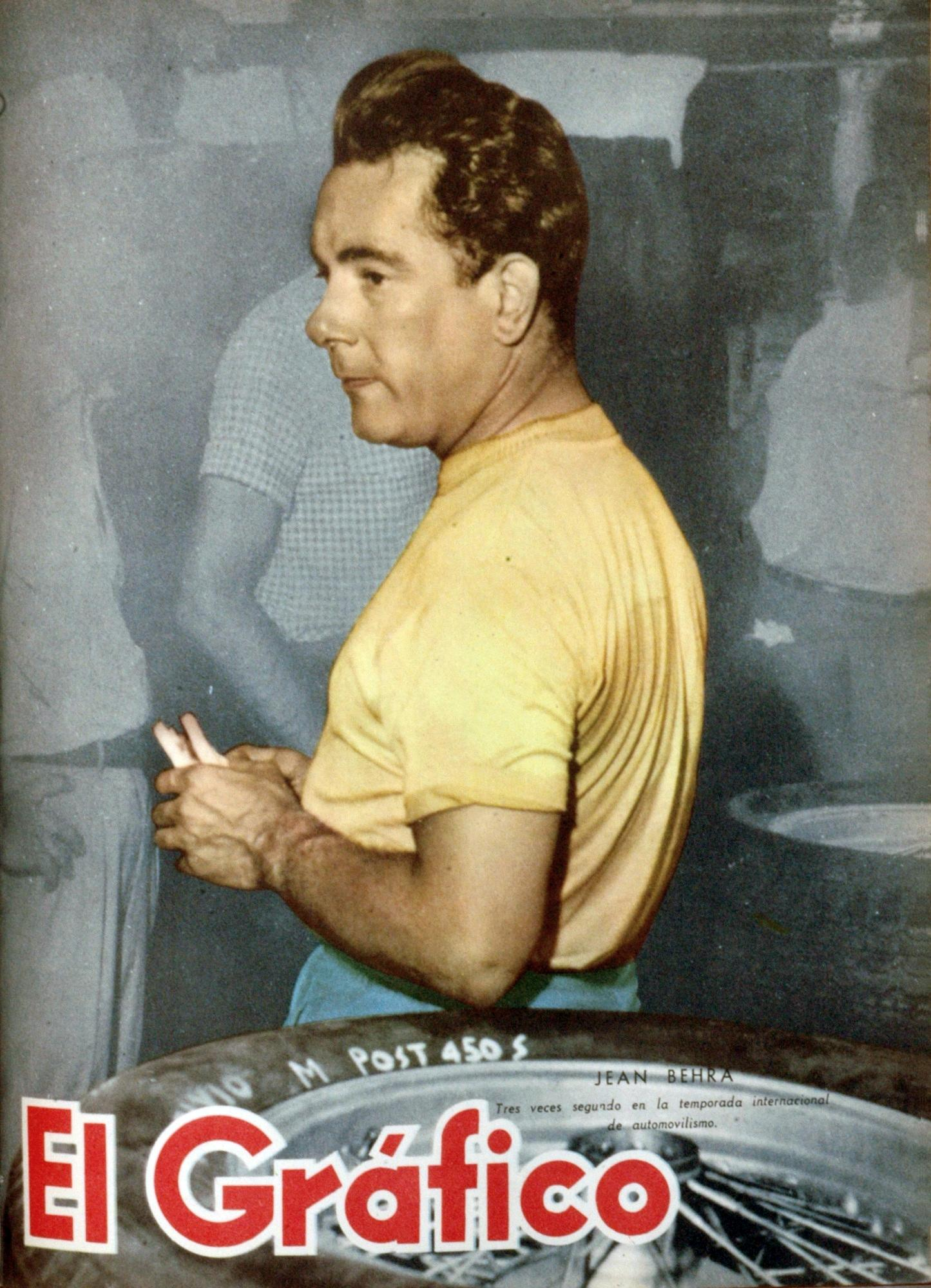
- Behra in 1953, on the cover of El Gráfico
- Born: Jean Marie Behra; 16 February 1921; Nice, France
- Died: 1 August 1959 (aged 38); West Berlin, West Germany
- Cause of death: Injuries sustained at the 1959 AVUS Formula Two round
- Children: 1
- Relatives: José Behra (brother)

Formula One World Championship career
- Nationality: (France) French
- Active years: 1952–1959
- Team(s): Gordini, Maserati, BRM, Ferrari, Behra-Porsche
- Entries: 54 (53 starts) (Note: Behra secretly replaced the unwell Maurice Trintignant for the race of the 1951 Italian Grand Prix. Team principal Amédée Gordini did not inform the race organisers about the switch as it would have cut the team's starting fee. Behra competed in the race but was not officially credited with the race start.)
- Championships: 0
- Wins: 0
- Podiums: 9
- Career points: 51 1/7
- Pole positions: 0
- Fastest laps: 1
- First entry: 1952 Swiss Grand Prix
- Last entry: 1959 French Grand Prix

Jean Marie Behra (16 February 1921 – 1 August 1959) was a French racing driver, who competed in Formula One from 1952 to 1959.

Behra contested 54 Formula One Grands Prix across eight seasons for Gordini, Maserati, BRM, Ferrari, and Behra-Porsche. He achieved nine podiums and one fastest lap, finishing fourth in the 1956 World Drivers' Championships with Maserati.

== Appearance and personality ==
Behra was small in stature, stocky, and weighed 178 pounds. Behra had big shoulders and was scarred from 12 crashes. In 1955 he had an ear torn off from a collision. He sometimes drove magnificently, while at other times he drove with a lack of enthusiasm. Behra was known for being hard-charging and temperamental, which led to confrontations with Ferrari team managers after being accused of overstressing engines at the 24 Hours of Le Mans and the Reims Grand Prix race in 1959. He was dismissed from the Ferrari team after assaulting a team manager, shortly before his death.

== Career synopsis ==
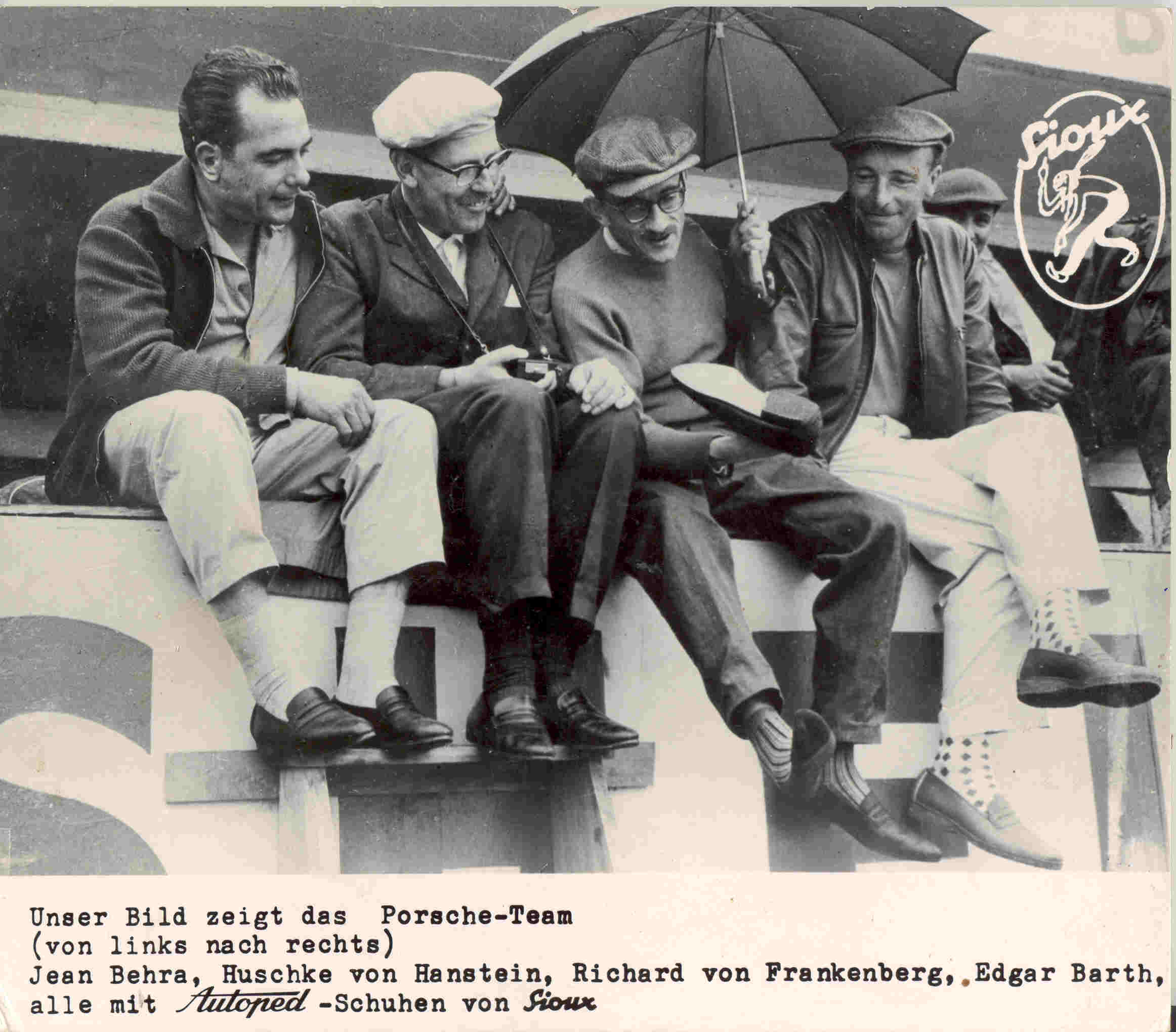
Jean Behra (left) with Fritz Huschke von Hanstein, Richard von Frankenberg and Edgar Barth

Behra raced motorcycles for Moto Guzzi prior to changing to sports cars and Grand Prix racing. In January 1950, he drove (with Julio Quinlin) a Simca 8 coupé to third place in the Monte Carlo Rally. Behra began driving cars competitively in 1952. Joakim Bonnier claimed that he learned the majority of his racing skill from Behra. Although he never achieved victory in a World Championship Formula One race, he managed an unquenchable thirst for motorsport, being considered a formidable competitor to the day he died. He hit the headlines when he won the non-title 1952 Reims Grand Prix. Between then and 1959, he scored many victories, but none in Formula One World Championship races.

== Gordini ==
Behra was in a Gordini in the Panamericana road race in the Mexican state of Oaxaca in November 1952. He won the first stage of the five-day race from Mexico's southern border to the United States border at Ciudad Juárez near El Paso. He started 19th and finished with a time of 3 hours, 41 minutes, and 44 seconds. On the second day of competition, Behra crashed his car on a curve approximately fifty miles from Puebla. In April 1954, Behra passed the leader in the last ten minutes on his way to victory in the Grand Prix of Pau, France. He finished 200 yards (180 m) ahead of Maurice Trintignant after having to make many pit stops due to mechanical trouble. Behra drove a six-cylinder Gordini.

== Maserati ==
Behra finished first at the Grand Prix de Pau for a second consecutive year, this time at the wheel of a Maserati. Alberto Ascari led until the 19th lap but dropped back after brake failure. A crowd of 50,000 watched as only eleven of sixteen starters finished the race. Behra and Luigi Musso were teammates in the 1,008 kilometre Supercortemaggiore Grand Prix at Monza, Italy. The two Italians shared a 3000cc Maserati that won and established course and lap records for 6.3 kilometre track.

Behra had surgery on his leg in June 1956, forcing him to miss a 1,000 kilometre Monza Grand Prix. He earned the pole position for the Rouen GP, a non-championship race for 3000cc sports cars, in July 1956. His Maserati was clocked at an average speed of nearly 155.46 kilometres per hour. Behra drove a Maserati to capture the Grand Prix of Rome, a 2000cc sports car event, in October 1956. His winning distance was 166.030 kilometres. He covered one lap in 2 minutes, 16.9 seconds, to average 174.003 kilometres an hour. This established a record for the Castelfusano track.

Behra had his best season in the Formula One World Championship in 1956, finishing fourth overall in the championship, with five podiums out of seven starts.

In April 1957, Behra turned in the quickest time for the Pau Grand Prix. He circuited the 2.77 kilometre course in 1 minute 35.7 seconds, which was a half second slower than his lap record time. The race covered a distance of 304.6 kilometres or about 190 miles (310 km). Behra won the race which was run through the streets of Pau, with an average speed of 62.7 mph (100.9 km/h). Behra was injured while testing a car for the Mille Miglia in May 1957. He recovered and entered a Maserati in the 24 hours of Le Mans on 22 June. Behra was triumphant in a Maserati at Kristianstad, Sweden in August 1957. He drove in a Swedish 6-hour Grand Prix at the Rabelov, 6,537 metre, asphalt track. He followed this with a win in the Grand Prix of Modena, Italy in September.

== Porsche ==
Behra drove a Porsche to victory in the sixth Rouen Grand Prix. He bested the British drivers, Graham Hill and Alan Stacey. Behra took fourth place at Porto in the 1958 Portuguese Grand Prix, driving for BRM. He drove a Porsche to achieve first place in the Grand Prix of Berlin, Germany held in September. He navigated the twenty circuits of the 5.19-mile (8.35 km) track with a time of 128.2 mph (206.3 km/h). in 48 minutes, 14.8 seconds. Altogether, he scored wins in eight straight European races in 1958. In each sports car event, he piloted a Porsche Spyder. In Formula One, he drove exclusively for BRM that year. Behra finished fourth at Riverside International Raceway in a small Porsche RSK, in October 1958. He made a quick exit and took an airplane to Europe, where he left for the Grand Prix of Morocco at Casablanca. He was in such a hurry that he left Riverside, California in an ambulance to make his flight.

== Final season and death ==
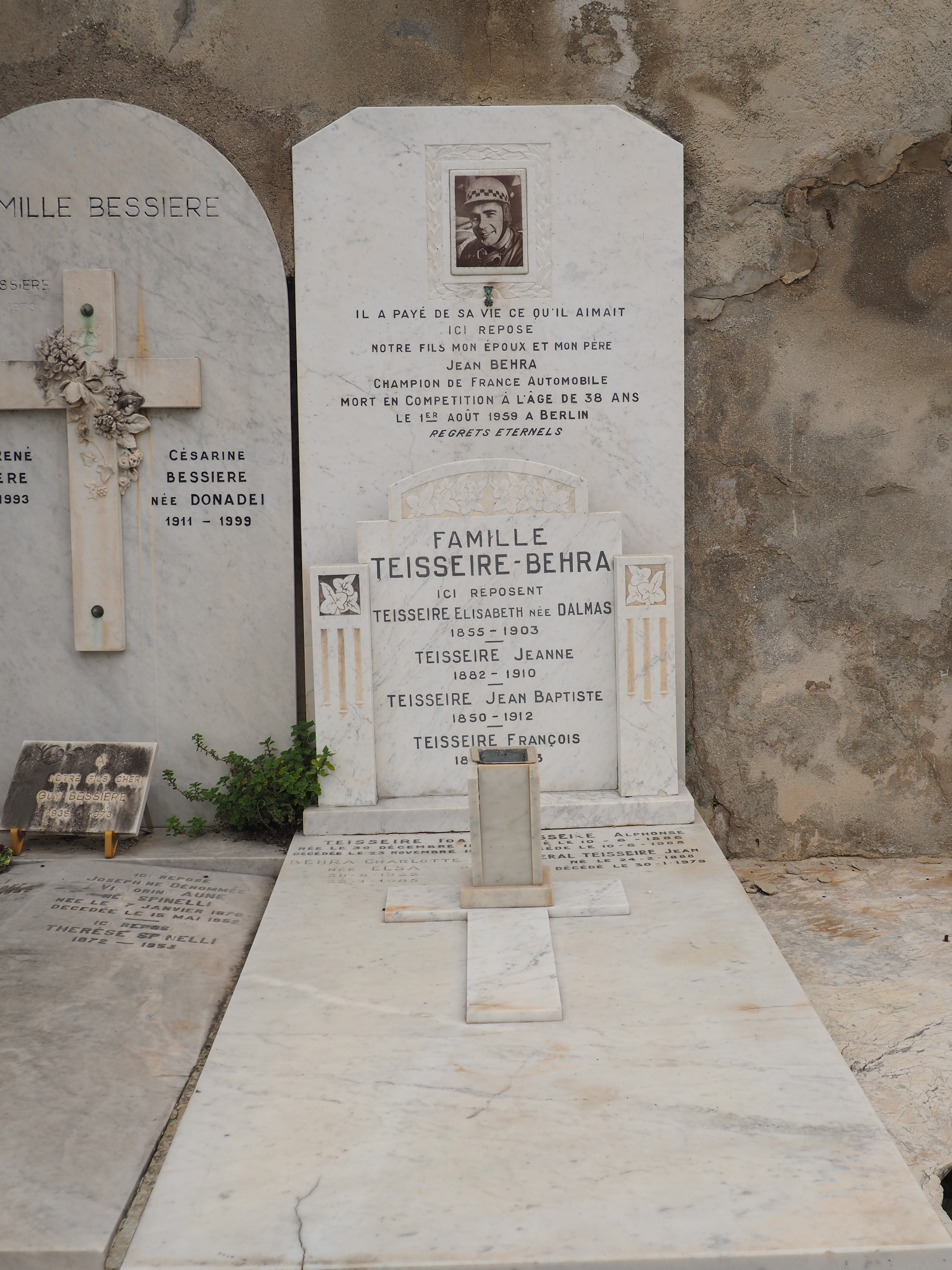
The grave of Jean Behra

In 1959, Behra moved to Ferrari where he partnered with Tony Brooks. Behra won a 200-mile (320 km) international race of Formula One cars at Aintree, in April 1959. He averaged 88.7 miles per hour in an event in which Brooks took second place, 10 seconds behind.

While still contracted to the team, Behra began development of a Formula Two car based on a Porsche 718 RSK. The team, known as Behra-Porsche, entered the 1959 Monaco Grand Prix with Maria Teresa de Filippis at the wheel but did not qualify. Despite the lack of initial success, Behra regarded the project as "tremendous fun" and was rewarded when Hans Herrmann drove the car to second in the prestigious Reims F2 race supporting that year's French Grand Prix. In so doing, Behra had beaten Scuderia Ferrari's own F2 entries, enraging Enzo Ferrari and doing little to ease tensions in an already strained relationship with the team. Things came to a head later that weekend, after he retired from the Grand Prix with a piston failure. Behra was involved in a strong discussion in a restaurant in which he punched team manager Romolo Tavoni and another patron, and was instantly dismissed from the team.

Less than a month later, Behra crashed his Porsche RSK in rainy weather in the sports car race that preceded the German Grand Prix at AVUS, in Berlin, Germany. He was thrown from his car and fatally injured when he hit a flagpole, causing a skull fracture.

The sports car race featured entries of small, under 1,500 c.c. engine capacity. After three laps, Behra was third behind Wolfgang von Trips and Bonnier, who eventually finished one and two. The AVUS was unique among race tracks. It used a strip of the Autobahn 2.5 miles (4.0 km) in length. The north and south bound lanes were fifty feet apart. At one end was a hairpin turn which drivers negotiated at around 30 mph (48 km/h). At the other end was a 30-foot (9.1 m) high, steeply banked loop. Behra lost control in the pouring rain, while going 110 mph (180 km/h). The Porsche began to fishtail with the tail of the car going higher and higher up the slick, steep bank. Then the Porsche spun and went over the top of the banking, with its nose pointing toward the sky. It landed heavily on its side on top of the banking. It remained there wrecked, while the race continued on underneath. Behra was thrown out and for a fleeting moment he could be seen against the background of the sky, with his arms outstretched as though attempting to fly. He impacted one of eight flagpoles arranged at the summit of the embankment which bore the flags of the competing nations. The flagpole toppled over when Behra collided with it, about halfway to its top.

Behra came down into trees and rolled almost into a street where drivers and cars often waited in a paddock to practice. A doctor arrived from a Red Cross ambulance close by. He examined Behra briefly and shook his head. A hospital bulletin stated that Behra broke most of his ribs in addition to the skull fracture which killed him. Currently AVUS is a vital part of the German public highway system as Autobahn A 115.

== Mourning ==
Behra was buried in Nice on 7 August, six days after his fatal crash. He had three funeral services: one in Berlin, another in Paris, and a final one in Nice. At the Nice service, 3,000 mourners lined the streets from wall to wall.

Behra left a nineteen-year-old son, Jean Paul. Behra's demise left only Maurice Trintignant among living French drivers of fame. Trintignant comforted Behra's family and called on the young men of France to defend the colours of their country in international motor racing. Conspicuously absent among those present in the racing community was Enzo Ferrari. He dropped Behra as a factory driver ten days before his death when he learned that Behra was going to race a Porsche at Avus in breach of their agreement and sent no remembrance to the funeral masses.

== Racing record ==
=== Complete Formula One World Championship results ===
(key) (Race in italics indicates fastest lap (shared))

Year	Entrant	Chassis	Engine	1	2	3	4	5	6	7	8	9	10	11	WDC	Points
1951	Equipe Gordini	Simca-Gordini T15	Gordini Straight-4	SUI	500	BEL	FRA	GBR	GER	ITA; Ret	ESP				NC	0
1952	Equipe Gordini	Gordini Type 16	Gordini Straight-6	SUI; 3	500	BEL; Ret	FRA; 7	GBR	GER; 5	NED; Ret	ITA; Ret				11th	6
1953	Equipe Gordini	Gordini Type 16	Gordini Straight-6	ARG; 6	500	NED	BEL; Ret	FRA; 10	GBR; Ret	GER; Ret	SUI; Ret	ITA			NC	0
1954	Equipe Gordini	Gordini Type 16	Gordini Straight-6	ARG; DSQ	500	BEL; Ret	FRA; 6	GBR; Ret	GER; 10	SUI; Ret	ITA; Ret	ESP; Ret			26th	1/7
1955	Officine Alfieri Maserati	Maserati 250F	Maserati Straight-6	ARG; 6 *	MON; 3 †	500	BEL; 5 ‡	NED; 6	GBR; Ret	ITA; 4					9th	6
1956	Officine Alfieri Maserati	Maserati 250F	Maserati Straight-6	ARG; 2	MON; 3	500	BEL; 7	FRA; 3	GBR; 3	GER; 3	ITA; Ret				4th	22
1957	Officine Alfieri Maserati	Maserati 250F	Maserati Straight-6	ARG; 2	MON	500	FRA; 6	GBR; Ret	GER; 6	PES; Ret					11th	6
1957	Officine Alfieri Maserati	Maserati 250F	Maserati V12								ITA; Ret				11th	6
1958	Ken Kavanagh	Maserati 250F	Maserati Straight-6	ARG; 5											11th	9
1958	Owen Racing Organisation	BRM P25	BRM Straight-4		MON; Ret	NED; 3	500	BEL; Ret	FRA; Ret	GBR; Ret	GER; Ret	POR; 4	ITA; Ret	MOR; Ret	11th	9
1959	Scuderia Ferrari	Ferrari Dino 246	Ferrari V6	MON; Ret	500	NED; 5	FRA; Ret	GBR							17th	2
1959	Jean Behra	Behra-Porsche RSK	Porsche Flat-4						GER; DNS	POR	ITA	USA			17th	2

* Indicates shared drive with Harry Schell
† Indicates shared drive with Cesare Perdisa
‡ Indicates shared drive with Roberto Mieres

=== Non-Championship Formula One results ===
(key)

Year	Entrant	Chassis	Engine	1	2	3	4	5	6	7	8	9	10	11	12	13	14	15	16	17	18	19	20	21	22	23	24	25	26	27	28	29	30	31	32	33	34	35	36
1951	Equipe Gordini	Gordini Type 16	Gordini Straight-6	SYR	PAU	RIC	SRM	BOR	INT	PAR	ULS	SCO	NED	ALB; 6	PES	BAR	GOO																						
1952	Equipe Gordini	Gordini Type 11	Gordini Straight-6	RIO	SYR	VAL	RIC	LAV	PAU; 3	IBS																													
1952	Equipe Gordini	Gordini Type 15	Gordini Straight-6								MAR; NC	AST	INT; Ret	ELÄ	NAP	EIF																							
1952	Equipe Gordini	Gordini Type 16	Gordini Straight-6														PAR; Ret	ALB; Ret	FRO	ULS	MNZ	LAC; 1	ESS	MAR; 1	SAB; DNS	CAE; 2	DAI	COM; 3	NAT	NAT	BAU; Ret	MOD; Ret	CAD	SKA	MAD	AVU	JOE	NEW	RIO
1953	Equipe Gordini	Gordini Type 16	Gordini Straight-6	SYR	PAU; Ret	LAV	AST	BOR	INT	ELÄ	NAP	ULS; DNA	WIN	FRO	COR	EIF	ALB	PRI	ESS	MID	ROU; Ret	CRY	AVU	USF	LAC; Ret	BRI	CHE	SAB; NC	NEW	CAD; 3	RED	SKA	LON	MOD; Ret	MAD	JOE	CUR		
1954	Equipe Gordini	Gordini Type 16	Gordini Straight-6	SYR	PAU; 1	LAV	BOR; Ret	INT; 2	BAR; 3	CUR	ROM; 4*	FRO	COR	BRC	CRY	ROU; DSQ	CAE; 3†	AUG	COR	OUT; Ret	RED	PES; 5	JOE	CAD; 1	BER; Ret	GOO	DAI; 16												
1955	Officine Alfieri Maserati	Maserati 250F	Maserati Straight-6	BUE	VLN; Ret	PAU; 1	GLV	BOR; 1	INT	NAP; 4	ALB	CUR	CRN	LON	REC	RDX	TLG	OUL	AVO	SYR																			
1956	Officine Alfieri Maserati	Maserati 250F	Maserati Straight-6	BUE; 3	GLV	SYR; Ret	AIN	INT	NAP	100	VNW	CAE	BRH																										
1957	Officine Alfieri Maserati	Maserati 250F	Maserati Straight-6	BUE; 2	SYR; Ret	PAU; 1	GLV	NAP	RMS; 2			MOD; 1	MOR; 1																										
1957	Jean Behra	BRM P25	BRM Straight-4							CAE; 1	INT; 1																												
1958	Owen Racing Organisation	BRM P25	BRM Straight-4	BUE	GLV; Ret	SYR	AIN; Ret	INT; 4	CAE; Ret																														
1959	Scuderia Ferrari	Ferrari Dino 246	Ferrari V6	BUE	GLV	AIN; 1	INT	OUL	SIL																														

* Indicates shared drive with André Simon
† Indicates shared drive with Jacques Pollet

== Notes ==
Sporting positions
Preceded by Stirling Moss	BRDC International Trophy; Winner; 1957	Succeeded by Peter Collins
Records
Preceded by Juan Manuel Fangio; 52 entries, 51 starts (1950 – 1958)	Most Grand Prix entries 53 entries, 52 starts (1950 – 1959), 53rd at the 1959 German GP	Succeeded by Harry Schell; 56 entries (56 starts), 54th at the 1959 Italian GP
