= Harry Schell =

American racing driver (1921–1960)

- Schell at the 1959 12 Hours of Sebring
- Born: Harry Lawrence O'Reilly Schell; June 29, 1921; Paris, France
- Died: May 13, 1960 (aged 38); Silverstone Circuit, Northamptonshire, England
- Cause of death: Injuries sustained at the 1960 BRDC International Trophy
- Spouse: Monique Pieri de Maretz ()
- Parent: Lucy O'Reilly Schell (mother)

Formula One World Championship career
- Nationality: (United States) American
- Active years: 1950–1960
- Team(s): Privateer Cooper, privateer Talbot-Lago, Platé, Gordini, privateer Maserati, Maserati, Ferrari, Vanwall, Centro Sud, Bonnier, BRM
- Entries: 57 (56 starts)
- Championships: 0
- Wins: 0
- Podiums: 2
- Career points: 32
- Pole positions: 0
- Fastest laps: 0
- First entry: 1950 Monaco Grand Prix
- Last entry: 1960 Argentine Grand Prix

24 Hours of Le Mans career
- Years: 1953, 1955, 1957
- Teams: Gordini, Ferrari, Maserati
- Best finish: 6th (1953)
- Class wins: 1 (1953)

Harry Lawrence O'Reilly Schell (June 29, 1921 – May 13, 1960) was an American racing driver, who competed in Formula One from 1950 to 1960.

Born and raised in Paris, Schell was the son of American motorsport executive and heiress Lucy O'Reilly Schell. With his Formula One debut at the 1950 Monaco Grand Prix, Schell became the first American driver to start a Formula One Grand Prix.

Schell died after crashing his Cooper T51 during practice for the non-championship 1960 BRDC International Trophy at Silverstone.

== Early life ==
Schell was born in the 16th arrondissement, Paris, France, the son of expatriate American and sometime auto racer Laury Schell; his mother was the wealthy American heiress Lucy O'Reilly Schell. O'Reilly was an auto racing enthusiast who had met Laury while visiting France; they soon became familiar names on the rallying scene together. She became heavily invested in the Delahaye concern, first campaigning sports cars for them and then championing the development of a Delahaye Grand Prix car, which she ran under the Ecurie Bleue banner. Frenchman René Dreyfus won the 1938 Pau Grand Prix for the team in a shock upset over Mercedes, but the Delahaye project failed to raise the necessary backing and was never developed to its full extent.

Shortly before the outbreak of the Second World War, Schell's parents were involved in a road accident in which Laury was killed and O'Reilly severely injured. When France was occupied by Germany, Schell and his mother returned to America, where she managed the operations of René Le Bègue and René Dreyfus during the 1940 Indianapolis 500. Having already volunteered in the Finnish Air Force during their Winter War with Russia in 1939, Harry then earned a commission in the United States Tank Corps when America entered the Second World War.

== Racing career ==
After the war, Schell attempted to qualify for the 1946 Indianapolis 500, failing to make the event. He went on to race in Europe, driving Coopers in Formula 3, Formula 2 and even the Formula One World Drivers' Championship upon its inception in 1950. His first appearance was in a Cooper powered by a J.A.P. V-twin engine at Monte Carlo; it ended in an accident at the harbor chicane that involved the majority of the field.

Though Schell never won a championship Grand Prix and enjoyed life as a playboy and womanizer, he was highly respected in period; he twice stood on the podium with a best place of second in the 1958 Dutch Grand Prix, won the Caen Grand Prix of 1956, and balanced those with periodic sports car outings. He partnered with Stirling Moss in securing a second place at the 1957 12 Hours of Sebring, and took third place at the same event in 1959. His most notable spells in Formula One came for BRM, Vanwall, and the Maserati factory effort as a team mate to the five-time champion Juan Manuel Fangio. He also drove for Scuderia Ferrari for two races at the 1955 Monaco Grand Prix and the 1955 Valentino Grand Prix.

Schell carved out a reputation as a safe and prudent competitor and could be counted on as a consistent points scorer, but he also proved his class when the opportunity presented itself. In the 1954 Spanish Grand Prix, he took the lead from the start in his private Maserati and drove off into the distance before spinning out of first place and then retiring with a transmission failure. At the 1956 French Grand Prix, he relieved an ill Mike Hawthorn after his own Vanwall had gone out with an early engine failure and drove back into second position. The Ferrari team, operating under the assumption that Schell was a lap adrift, had been caught out, and a dramatic fight for the lead ensued, but Schell's effort went for nought as he was forced to make a lengthy pit stop soon after. He had succeeded, however, in displaying the full potential of the Vanwall on the world stage for the first time. Driving a Ferrari 375 Indy for Luigi Chinetti's North American Racing Team at the 1958 Race of Two Worlds, Schell joined Phil Hill (Scuderia Ferrari 296 Dino) and Masten Gregory (Ecurie Ecosse Jaguar D-Type) on the Monza high banking as the only American drivers not entered in an American Championship Car.

By the start of 1960, and nearing 40, Schell's prospects appeared dim, and he campaigned a private Cooper run under his family's Ecurie Bleue banner. That changed, however, when he was contracted by the British Racing Partnership team before the start of the European Grand Prix season for a full program of events, to be teamed with Tony Brooks and the up-and-coming Chris Bristow in year-old Coopers. Schell died in practice for the non-championship International Trophy event at Silverstone in 1960, when he crashed his Cooper at Abbey Curve. Schell was driving at approximately 100 mph when his car slid into the mud on the side of the track and lost a wheel. The Cooper somersaulted and penetrated a safety barrier, causing a brick wall to collapse.

Prior to his death, Schell had been extremely vocal in the promotion of the roll-bar on European racing cars, a safety feature required in America. By the 1500cc formula of 1961, it had become standard in Formula One.

== Motorsports career results ==
=== Post WWII Grandes Épreuves results ===
(key)

Year	Entrant	Chassis	Engine	1	2	3	4	5
1947	Ecurie Laury Schell	Cisitalia D46	Fiat 1.1 L4	SUI; DNQ	BEL	ITA	FRA	
1949	Horschell Racing Corporation	Talbot-Lago T26	Talbot 4.5 L6	GBR	BEL	SUI; 16	FRA	ITA

=== FIA World Drivers' Championship results ===
(key)

Year	Entrant	Chassis	Engine	1	2	3	4	5	6	7	8	9	10	11	WDC	Pts
1950	Horschell Racing Corporation	Cooper T12	JAP 1.1 V2	GBR	MON; Ret	500									NC	0
1950	Ecurie Bleue	Talbot-Lago T26C	Talbot 23CV 4.5 L6				SUI; 8	BEL	FRA	ITA					NC	0
1951	Enrico Platé	Maserati 4CLT/48	Maserati 4CLT 1.5 L4s	SUI; 12	500	BEL	FRA; Ret	GBR	GER	ITA	ESP				NC	0
1952	Enrico Platé	Maserati 4CLT/48	Platé 2.0 L4	SUI; Ret	500	BEL	FRA; Ret*	GBR; 17	GER	NED	ITA				NC	0
1953	Equipe Gordini	Gordini T16	Gordini 20 2.0 L6	ARG; 7*	500	NED; Ret	BEL; 7	FRA; Ret	GBR; Ret	GER; Ret	SUI	ITA; 9			NC	0
1954	Harry Schell	Maserati A6GCM	Maserati A6 2.0 L6	ARG; 6	500	BEL	FRA; Ret	GBR; 12	GER; 7						NC	0
1954	Officine Alfieri Maserati	Maserati 250F	Maserati 250F1 2.5 L6							SUI; Ret	ITA				NC	0
1954	Harry Schell	Maserati 250F	Maserati 250F1 2.5 L6									ESP; Ret			NC	0
1955	Officine Alfieri Maserati	Maserati 250F	Maserati 250F1 2.5 L6	ARG; 6+7*											NC	0
1955	Scuderia Ferrari	Ferrari 555	Ferrari 555 2.5 L4		MON; Ret	500	BEL; DNS	NED							NC	0
1955	Vandervell Products	Vanwall VW 55	Vanwall 254 2.5 L4						GBR; 9*	ITA; Ret					NC	0
1956	Vandervell Products	Vanwall VW 2	Vanwall 254 2.5 L4	ARG	MON; Ret	500	BEL; 4	FRA; 10*	GBR; Ret		ITA; Ret				17th	3
1956	Scuderia Centro Sud	Maserati 250F	Maserati 250F1 2.5 L6							GER; Ret					17th	3
1957	Scuderia Centro Sud	Maserati 250F	Maserati 250F1 2.5 L6	ARG; 4											7th	10
1957	Officine Alfieri Maserati	Maserati 250F	Maserati 250F1 2.5 L6		MON; Ret*	500	FRA; 5	GBR; Ret	GER; 7	PES; 3	ITA; 5*				7th	10
1958	Jo Bonnier	Maserati 250F	Maserati 250F1 2.5 L6	ARG; 6											6th	14
1958	Owen Racing Organisation	BRM P25	BRM P25 2.5 L4		MON; 5	NED; 2	500	BEL; 5	FRA; Ret	GBR; 5	GER; Ret	POR; 6	ITA; Ret	MOR; 5	6th	14
1959	Owen Racing Organisation	BRM P25	BRM P25 2.5 L4	MON; Ret	500	NED; Ret	FRA; 7	GBR; 4	GER; 7	POR; 5	ITA; 7				13th	5
1959	Ecurie Bleue	Cooper T51	Climax FPF 2.5 L4									USA; Ret			13th	5
1960	Ecurie Bleue	Cooper T51	Climax FPF 2.2 L4	ARG; Ret	MON	500	NED	BEL	FRA	GBR	POR	ITA	USA		NC	0

* Shared drive/s.

=== Non-championship Formula One results ===
(key) (Races in bold indicate pole position; races in italics indicate fastest lap)

Year	Entrant	Chassis	Engine	1	2	3	4	5	6	7	8	9	10	11	12	13	14	15	16	17	18	19	20	21	22	23	24	25	26	27	28	29	30	31	32	33	34	35
1950	Enrico Platé	Maserati 4CLT/48	Maserati 4CLT 1.5 L4s	PAU	RIC	SRM	PAR	EMP	BAR	JER	ALB	NED	NAT; Ret	NOT	ULS	PES	STT	INT	GOO	PEN																		
1951	Enrico Platé	Maserati 4CLT/48	Maserati 4CLT 1.5 L4s	SYR; Ret	PAU; Ret	RIC	SRM; 4	BOR; Ret	INT; 19	PAR; 7	ULS	SCO	NED	ALB	PES; 7	BAR; Ret	GOO																					
1952	Enrico Platé	Maserati 4CLT/48	Maserati 4CLT 1.5 L4s	SYR	VAL	RIC	LAV	PAU	IBS	MAR	AST	INT; Ret	ELA	NAP	EIF	PAR; Ret					LAC; 4	ESS	MAR; Ret	SAB; Ret		DMT; Ret												
1952	Equipe Gordini	Gordini T16	Gordini 20 2.0 L6														ALB; Ret	FRO	ULS	MNZ											CAD; 2	SKA	MAD	AVU	FRY	NEW		
1952	Equipe Gordini	Gordini T15	Gordini 1500 1.5 L4																						CAE; Ret		COM; Ret	NAT	BAU; Ret	MOD								
1953	Equipe Gordini	Gordini T16	Gordini 20 2.0 L6	SYR	PAU; 3	LAV	AST	BOR; 4	INT; DNS	ELA	NAP	ULS	WIN	COR	FRO	SNE	EIF	ALB; DNQ	PRN	ESS	MID	ROU; 4	CLP	AVU	UST	**LAC**; Ret	BRI	CHE	SAB; Ret	NEW	CAD; 2	RED	SKA	LON	MOD; 6	MAD	FRY	CUR
1954	Officine Alfieri Maserati	Maserati A6GCM	Maserati A6 2.0 L6	SYR	PAU; Ret	LAV																																
1954	Harry Schell	Maserati A6GCM	Maserati A6 2.0 L6				BOR; Ret	INT	BAR; 5	CUR	ROM; 2	FRO	BRC	COR	CLP	ROU; Ret	CAE; Ret	AUG	COR	OUL	RED	PES; 3	FRY	CAD; Ret	BER; 8	GOO												
1954	Harry Schell	Maserati 250F	Maserati 250F1 2.5 L6																								DTT; 3											
1955	Scuderia Ferrari	Ferrari 625	Ferrari 555 2.5 L4	VAL; 5	PAU	GLV	BOR	INT	NAP	ALB	CUR	COR																										
1955	Vandervell Products	Vanwall VW 2	Vanwall 254 2.5 L4										LON; 2	DRT	RED; 1	DTT	OUL; Ret	**AVO**; 1																				
1955	Officine Alfieri Maserati	Maserati 250F	Maserati 250F1 2.5 L6																SYR; 5																			
1956	Vandervell Products	Vanwall VW 55	Vanwall 254 2.5 L4	GLV	SYR	AIN	INT; Ret	NAP	AIN	VAN																												
1956	Officine Alfieri Maserati	Maserati 250F	Maserati 250F1 2.5 L6								CAE; 1	BRS																										
1957	Officine Alfieri Maserati	Maserati 250F	Maserati 250F1 2.5 L6	SYR; Ret				RMS; 4			MOD; 3	MOR; 5																										
1957	Scuderia Centro Sud	Maserati 250F	Maserati 250F1 2.5 L6		PAU; 2	GLV	NAP																															
1957	Owen Racing Organisation	BRM P25	BRM P25 2.5 L4						CAE; Ret	INT; 2																												
1958	Owen Racing Organisation	BRM P25	BRM P25 2.5 L4	GLV; Ret	SYR			CAE; Ret																														
1958	Owen Racing Organisation	Cooper T43	Climax FPF 1.5 L4			AIN; 6	INT																															
1959	Owen Racing Organisation	BRM P25	BRM P25 2.5 L4	**GLV**; 3	AIN; Ret	INT	OUL	SIL																														
1960	Yeoman Credit Racing Team	Cooper T51	Climax FPF 2.5 L4	GLV; Ret	INT; DNS	SIL	LOM	OUL																														

=== 24 Hours of Le Mans results ===
Year	Team	Co-Drivers	Car	Class	Laps	Pos.	Class Pos.
1953	(France) Automobiles Gordini	(France) Maurice Trintignant	Gordini T26S	S 3.0	293	6th	**1st**
1955	(Italy) Scuderia Ferrari	(France) Maurice Trintignant	Ferrari 121LM	S 5.0	107	DNF	DNF
1957	(Italy) Officine Alfieri Maserati	(United Kingdom) Stirling Moss	Maserati 450S Zagato Coupé	S 5.0	32	DNF	DNF

Sporting positions
Preceded by Bob Cortner	Formula One fatal accidents May 13, 1960	Succeeded by Chris Bristow
Records
Preceded by Jean Behra; 53 entries, 52 starts (1950 – 1959)	Most Grand Prix entries 56 entries, 56 starts (1950 – 1960), 54th at the 1959 Italian GP	Succeeded by Stirling Moss; 67 entries (66 starts), 57th at the 1960 Portuguese GP
