= Mario Alborghetti =

Italian racing driver (1928–1955)

- Born: 23 October 1928; Milan, Italy
- Died: 11 April 1955 (aged 26); Pau, France

Mario Alborghetti (23 October 1928 – 11 April 1955) was an Italian motor racing driver who raced in Formula One for the Volpini-Arzani team. He was killed in an accident during his Grand Prix debut.

== Career ==
A wealthy man, Alborghetti commissioned designer Gianpaolo Volpini and engineer Egidio Arzani to build him a Grand Prix car to drive. The group acquired an ex-Scuderia Milano Maserati 4CLT with a Speluzzi engine. The vehicle was overhauled, with new bodywork and an engine which conformed with the 2.5l Formula One regulations then in place. The special was entered for the 1955 Turin Grand Prix but work was not finished and the team failed to arrive.

== Accident and death ==
The car was ready in time for the 1955 Pau Grand Prix. Pau was considered to be a difficult circuit, especially for a driver as inexperienced as Alborghetti. In practice he set 15th fastest time out of 16 runners, nearly 19 seconds slower than Jean Behra's pole time. By the 19th lap of the race he was far behind the majority of the field after three pit-stops when Alborghetti was distracted at the hairpin by the approach of Jacques Pollet's Gordini to lap him. Alborghetti seemed to hit the wrong pedal as he came to the bend, pressing the accelerator instead of the brakes and ploughing into the straw bales. Several spectators received minor injuries in the accident while Alborghetti suffered fatal chest and head wounds, the impact having torn his helmet off. His death was not announced until after Behra had won the race.

The Volpini-Arzani special was mothballed until the 1955 Italian Grand Prix, when it was unsuccessfully entered for Luigi Piotti before disappearing once again.

== Motorsport career results ==
=== Non-championship Formula One results ===
(key) (Races in bold indicate pole position) (Races in italics indicate fastest lap)

Year	Entrant	Chassis	Engine	1	2	3	4	5	6	7	8	9	10	11	12	13	14	15	16
1955	Scuderia Milano	4CLT	Speluzzi	VAL; DNA	PAU; Ret	GLO	BOR	INT	NAP	ALB	CUR	COR	LON	DAR	RED	DAT	OUT	AVO	SYR

Preceded by Onofre Marimón	Formula One fatal accidents 11 April 1955	Succeeded by Manny Ayulo
