= 1954 Caen Grand Prix =

- Non-championship race in the 1954 Formula One season
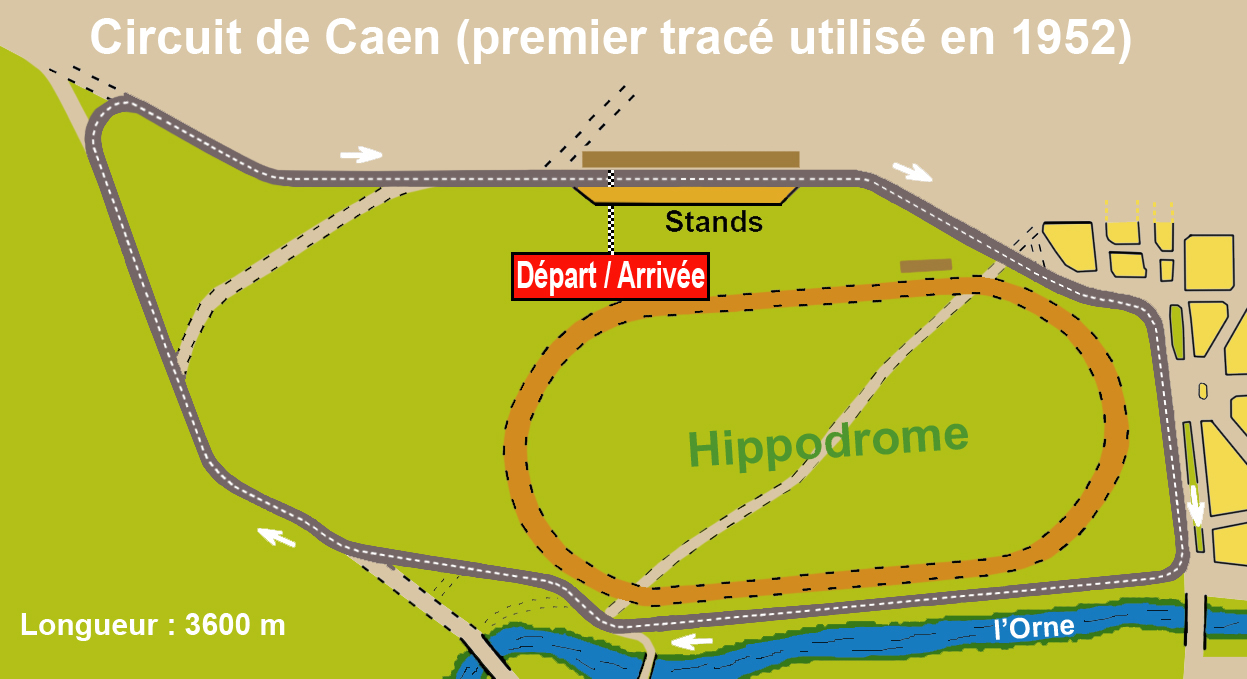

Race details
- Date: 25 July 1954
- Official name: III Grand Prix de Caen
- Location: La Prairie, Caen, France
- Course: Temporary street circuit
- Course length: 3.52 km (2.19 miles)
- Distance: 60 laps, 211.12 km (131.24 miles)

Pole position
| Driver | (France) Maurice Trintignant | Ferrari |
- Time: 1:26.

Fastest lap
| Driver | (United Kingdom) Stirling Moss | Maserati |
- Time: 1:25.7

Podium
| First | (France) Maurice Trintignant | Ferrari |
| Second | (United Kingdom) Stirling Moss | Maserati |
| Third | (France) Jacques Pollet (France) Jean Behra | Gordini |

The 3rd Grand Prix de Caen was a motor race, run to Formula One rules, held on 25 July 1954 at the Circuit de la Prairie, Caen. The race was run over 60 laps of the circuit, and was won by French driver Maurice Trintignant in a Ferrari 625, who started from pole position. British driver Stirling Moss in a Maserati 250F finished a close second and set fastest lap. Gordini driver Jacques Pollet shared third place with Jean Behra after Behra crashed his own car earlier in the race.

== Classification ==
| Pos | No. | Driver | Entrant | Constructor | Time/Retired | Grid |
|---|---|---|---|---|---|---|
| 1 | 8 | (France) Maurice Trintignant | Scuderia Ferrari | Ferrari 625 | 1:29.01, 142.02 km/h | 1 |
| 2 | 14 | (United Kingdom) Stirling Moss | Officine Alfieri Maserati | Maserati 250F | +3.6s | 2 |
| 3 | 6 | (France) Jacques Pollet (France) Jean Behra | Équipe Gordini | Gordini Type 16 | +2 laps | 6 |
| 4 | 20 | (Thailand) B. Bira | Prince Bira | Maserati 250F | +3 laps | 8 |
| 5 | 10 | (France) Louis Rosier | Équipe Rosier | Ferrari 625 | +4 laps | 9 |
| Ret | 12 | (France) Robert Manzon | Équipe Rosier | Ferrari 625 | 38 laps, timing gear | 7 |
| Ret | 4 | (Argentina) Clemar Bucci | Équipe Gordini | Gordini Type 16 | 28 laps, oil pipe | 4 |
| Ret | 18 | (United States) Harry Schell | Harry Schell | Maserati A6GCM | 24 laps, flywheel | 5 |
| Ret | 2 | (France) Jean Behra | Équipe Gordini | Gordini Type 16 | 4 laps, crash | 3 |
| DNS | 16 | (Argentina) Roberto Mieres | Écurie Maserati Argentino | Maserati A6GCM | car not ready | - |

| Previous race: 1954 Rouen Grand Prix | Formula One non-championship races 1954 season | Next race: 1954 August Cup |
| Previous race: 1953 Caen Grand Prix | Caen Grand Prix | Next race: 1956 Caen Grand Prix |
