= 1954 Pau Grand Prix =

- Non-championship race in the 1954 Formula One season

Race details
- Date: 19 April 1954
- Official name: XV Pau Grand Prix
- Location: Pau, France
- Course: Temporary Street Circuit
- Course length: 2.760 km (1.720 miles)
- Distance: 109 laps, 300.840 km (186.933 miles)

Pole position
Driver	(Italy) Giuseppe Farina	Scuderia Ferrari
- Time: 1:36.3

Fastest lap
Driver	(France) Jean Behra	Equipe Gordini
- Time: 1:35.2

Podium
First	(France) Jean Behra	Equipe Gordini
Second	(France) Maurice Trintignant	Ferrari
Third	(Argentina) Roberto Mieres	Maserati

The 1954 Pau Grand Prix was a non-championship Formula One motor race held on 19 April 1954 at the Pau circuit, in Pau, Pyrénées-Atlantiques, France. The Grand Prix was won by Jean Behra, driving with Equipe Gordini. Maurice Trintignant finished second and Roberto Mieres third.

== Classification ==
=== Race ===
Pos	No	Driver	Vehicle	Laps	Time/Retired	Grid
1	2	(France) Jean Behra	Gordini T16	109	3hrs 00min 02sec	6
2	14	(France) Maurice Trintignant	Ferrari 625	109	+ 2.0 s	2
3	20	(Argentina) Roberto Mieres	Maserati A6GCM	106	+ 3 laps	5
4	4	(France) Élie Bayol	Gordini T16	105	+ 4 laps	9
5	10	(Italy) Giuseppe Farina	Ferrari 625	105	+ 4 laps	1
6	16	(France) Louis Rosier	Ferrari 625	104	+ 5 laps	12
7	8	(Belgium) André Pilette	Gordini T16	104	+ 5 laps	11
Ret	18	(Argentina) Onofre Marimón	Maserati 250F	51	de Dion tube	4
Ret	12	(Argentina) José Froilán González	Ferrari 625	24	Crankshaft	3
Ret	6	(France) Eugène Martin	Gordini T16	23	Accident	10
Ret	24	(France) Robert Manzon	Ferrari 500	16	Gearbox	8
Ret	22	(United States) Harry Schell	Maserati A6GCM	6	Rear axle	7
DNA	6	(France) Jacques Pollet	Gordini T16		Did not attend	
Fastest Lap: Jean Behra (Equipe Gordini) – 1:35.2

Previous race: 1954 Syracuse Grand Prix	Formula One non-championship races 1954 season	Next race: 1954 Lavant Cup
Previous race: 1953 Pau Grand Prix	Pau Grand Prix	Next race: 1955 Pau Grand Prix
