= 1954 Bari Grand Prix =

- Non-championship race in the 1954 Formula One season
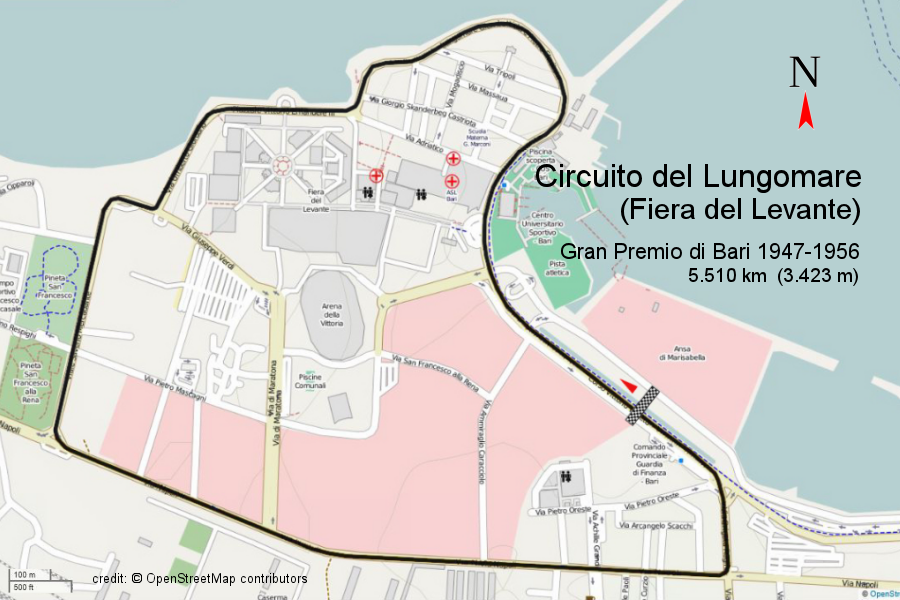

Race details
- Date: 22 May 1954
- Official name: VII Gran Premio di Bari
- Location: Bari, Italy
- Course: Temporary Street Circuit
- Course length: 5.510 km (3.423 miles)
- Distance: 60 laps, 330.60 km (205.38 miles)

Pole position
Driver	(Argentina) José Froilán González	Ferrari

Fastest lap
Driver	(Argentina) Onofre Marimón	Maserati
- Time: 2:16.5

Podium
First	(Argentina) José Froilán González	Ferrari
Second	(France) Maurice Trintignant	Ferrari
Third	(France) Jean Behra	Gordini

The 1954 Bari Grand Prix was a non-championship Formula One motor race held on 22 May 1954 on a street circuit in Bari, Apulia, Italy. The Grand Prix was won by José Froilán González in a Ferrari 625. González also took pole position. Maurice Trintignant finished second in another Ferrari 625 and Jean Behra was third in a Gordini T16. Fastest lap was set by Onofre Marimón in a Maserati 250F.

== Classification ==
=== Race ===
Pos	No	Driver	Entrant	Car	Time/Retired	Grid
1	2	(Argentina) José Froilán González	Scuderia Ferrari	Ferrari 625	2:21:08.4, 140.83kph	1
2	8	(France) Maurice Trintignant	Scuderia Ferrari	Ferrari 625	+6.8s	2
3	6	(France) Jean Behra	Equipe Gordini	Gordini T16	+1:01.4	3
4	4	(Argentina) Onofre Marimón	Officine Alfieri Maserati	Maserati 250F	+1 lap	4
5		(United States) Harry Schell	Harry Schell	Maserati A6GCM	+2 laps	
6		(Thailand) B. Bira	Prince Bira	Maserati A6GCM	+4 laps	
7	16	(Italy) Umberto Maglioli	Scuderia Ferrari	Ferrari 625	+6 laps	7
Ret	14	(Argentina) Roberto Mieres	Officine Alfieri Maserati	Maserati A6GCM		6
Ret	10	(France) André Simon	Equipe Gordini	Gordini T16		8
Ret	20	(France) Robert Manzon	Equipe Rosier	Ferrari 500	27 laps, piston	5
Ret		(France) Louis Rosier	Equipe Rosier	Ferrari 500		
Ret		(Italy) Sergio Mantovani	Officine Alfieri Maserati	Maserati 250F	3 laps, shock absorber	

Previous race: 1954 Bordeaux Grand Prix	Formula One non-championship races 1954 season	Next race: 1954 Curtis Trophy
Previous race: 1953 Bari Grand Prix	Bari Grand Prix	Next race: 1955 Bari Grand Prix
