= 1954 Rouen Grand Prix =

1954 Rouen-les-Essarts Grand Prix
- Non-championship race in the 1954 Formula One season
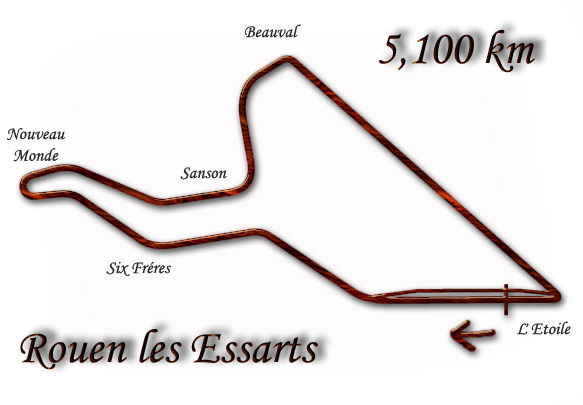

Race details
- Date: 11 July 1954
- Official name: IV Grand Prix de Rouen-les-Essarts
- Location: Rouen, Normandy
- Course: Rouen-Les-Essarts
- Course length: 5.100 km (3.169 miles)
- Distance: 95 laps, 484.50 km (300.840 miles)
- Weather: Warm and Dry

Pole position
Driver	(France) Maurice Trintignant	Ferrari
- Time: 2:09.4

Fastest lap
Driver	(France) Maurice Trintignant	Ferrari
- Time: 2:09.9

Podium
First	(France) Maurice Trintignant	Ferrari
Second	(Thailand) B. Bira	Maserati
Third	(United Kingdom) Roy Salvadori	Maserati

The 4th Grand Prix de Rouen-les-Essarts was a non-championship Formula One motor race held on 11 July 1954 at the Rouen-Les-Essarts circuit, in Rouen, Normandy, France. The winner was Maurice Trintignant in a Ferrari 625. Trintignant also took pole and set fastest lap. B. Bira and Roy Salvadori were second and third in their Maserati 250Fs.

== Classification ==
=== Race ===
Pos	No	Driver	Entrant	Car	Time/Retired	Grid
1	18	(France) Maurice Trintignant	Scuderia Ferrari	Ferrari 625	3:40:34.5, 132.12kph	1
2	22	(Thailand) B. Bira	Prince Bira	Maserati 250F	+1 lap	8
3	30	(United Kingdom) Roy Salvadori	Gilby Engineering	Maserati 250F	+5 laps	9
4	6	(Belgium) Georges Berger	Equipe Gordini	Gordini T16	+5 laps	12
5	34	(Argentina) Jorge Daponte	Jorge Daponte	Maserati A6GCM	+10 laps	14
6	4	(Argentina) Clemar Bucci	Equipe Gordini	Gordini T16	+11 laps, gearbox	7
7	28	(United Kingdom) Ted Whiteaway	E.N. Whiteaway	HWM-Alta	+15 laps	13
8	12	(France) Robert Manzon	Equipe Rosier	Ferrari 625	+15 laps	6
9	10	(France) Louis Rosier	Equipe Rosier	Ferrari 500	+22 laps	11
Ret	8	(Belgium) André Pilette	Equipe Gordini	Gordini T16	40 laps, transmission	5
Ret	24	(United States) Harry Schell	Harry Schell	Maserati A6GCM	33 laps, mechanical	10
Ret	14	(Argentina) José Froilán González	Scuderia Ferrari	Ferrari 553	16 laps, engine	4
DSQ	16	(United Kingdom) Mike Hawthorn	Scuderia Ferrari	Ferrari 625	push start	3
DSQ	2	(France) Jean Behra	Equipe Gordini	Gordini T16	push start	2
DNS	32	(United Kingdom) Alan Brown	Ecurie Richmond	Cooper T23-Bristol		-
DNQ	4	(France) Jacques Pollet	Equipe Gordini	Gordini T16	car qualified by Bucci	-
DNA	6	(Argentina) Roberto Mieres	Roberto Mieres	Maserati A6GCM	transporter crash, car destroyed	-
DNA	6	(Italy) Giovanni de Riu	Giovanni de Riu	Maserati A6GCM		-

Previous race: 1954 Crystal Palace Trophy	Formula One non-championship races 1954 season	Next race: 1954 Caen Grand Prix
Previous race: 1953 Rouen Grand Prix	Rouen Grand Prix	Next race: 1956 Rouen Grand Prix
