= Caen Grand Prix =

French auto racing event

The Grand Prix de Caen was an auto racing event, held in la Prairie park in Caen.

Only six races were held between 1952 and 1958, the 1955 race being cancelled after that year's Le Mans disaster. The first race was run under Formula Two rules. In 1953 the event was run for sports cars, and all subsequent events were run under Formula One rules.

== Winners ==
| Year | Race title | Driver/s | Vehicle | Classification | Report |
|---|---|---|---|---|---|
| 1952 | I Grand Prix de Caen | (France) Maurice Trintignant | Gordini Type 16 | Non-Championship Formula 2 | 1952 Caen Grand Prix |
| 1953 | II Grand Prix de Caen | (France) Pierre Chancel | Panhard X85 | Sports car racing | 1953 Caen Grand Prix |
| 1954 | III Grand Prix de Caen | (France) Maurice Trintignant | Ferrari 625 | Non-Championship Formula 1 | 1954 Caen Grand Prix |
| 1956 | IV Grand Prix de Caen | (United States) Harry Schell | Maserati 250F | Non-Championship Formula 1 | 1956 Caen Grand Prix |
| 1957 | V Grand Prix de Caen | (France) Jean Behra | BRM P25 | Non-Championship Formula 1 | 1957 Caen Grand Prix |
| 1958 | VI Grand Prix de Caen | (United Kingdom) Stirling Moss | Cooper T45-Climax | Non-Championship Formula 1 | 1958 Caen Grand Prix |
