= 1952 Caen Grand Prix =

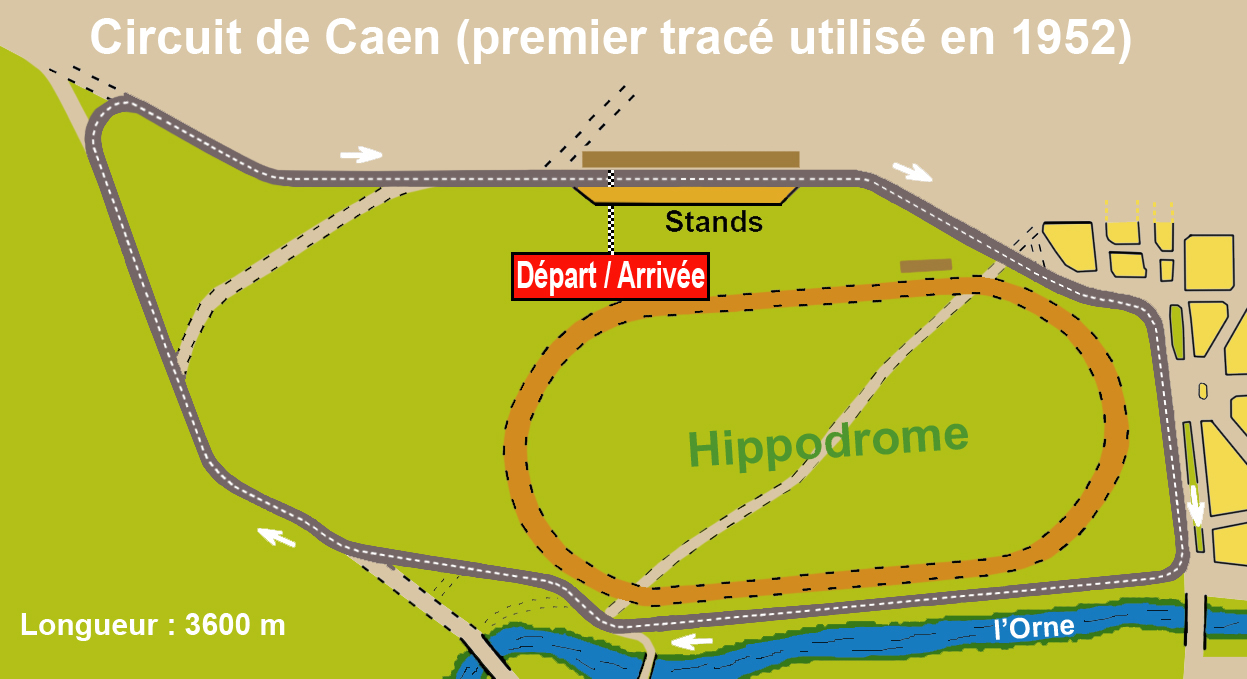

Race details
- Date: 27 July 1952
- Official name: I Grand Prix de Caen
- Location: La Prairie, Caen, France
- Course: Temporary street circuit
- Course length: 4.121 km (2.561 mi)
- Distance: 136 laps, 309.115 km (192.075 mi)

Pole position
Driver	(France) Maurice Trintignant	Gordini

Podium
First	(France) Maurice Trintignant	Gordini
Second	(France) Jean Behra	Gordini
Third	(France) Louis Rosier	Ferrari

The 1st Grand Prix de Caen was a Formula Two motor race held on 27 July 1952 at the Circuit de la Prairie, Caen. The race was run over 75 laps of the circuit, and was won by French driver Maurice Trintignant in a Gordini Type 16. Trintignant's teammate Jean Behra was second and Louis Rosier was third in a Ferrari 500.

== Classification ==
Pos	No.	Driver	Entrant	Constructor	Time/Retired	Grid
1	8	(France) Maurice Trintignant	Équipe Gordini	Gordini Type 16	2:15:34.4, 134.90 km/h	1
2	6	(France) Jean Behra	Équipe Gordini	Gordini Type 16	+36.6s	
3	2	(France) Louis Rosier	Écurie Rosier	Ferrari 500	+2:23.0	2
4	4	(France) Armand Philippe	Écurie Rosier	Ferrari 166	+7 laps	
NC	30	(France) Michel Aunaud	Écurie Jeudy	DB-Panhard	+9 laps	
NC	24	(France) René Bonnet	Écurie Jeudy	DB-Panhard	+9 laps	
NC	32	(France) Louis Pons	Louis Pons	DB-Panhard	+11 laps	
NC	26	(France) Pierre Chaussat	Écurie Jeudy	DB-Panhard	+13 laps	
NC	22	(France) Jean Morel	Jean Morel	Cisitalia D46	+17 laps	
NC	20	(France) Theo Martin	Theo Martin	Simca-Gordini	+21 laps	
Ret	16	(France) André Simon	HW Motors Ltd	HWM-Alta		
Ret	14	(France) Yves Giraud-Cabantous	HW Motors Ltd	HWM-Alta	wheel	3
Ret	12	(France) Jacques Pollet	Équipe Gordini	Simca Gordini Type 15		
Ret	10	(United States) Harry Schell	Équipe Gordini	Simca Gordini Type 15	gearbox	
Ret	18	(France) Marcel Balsa	Marcel Balsa	BMW Special-BMW 328	ignition	
Ret	28	(France) Alphonse de Burnay	Écurie Jeudy	DB-Panhard		

Previous race: 1952 Sables Grand Prix	Formula One non-championship races 1952 season	Next race: 1952 Daily Mail Trophy
Previous race: 1951 Caen Grand Prix	Caen Grand Prix	Next race: 1953 Caen Grand Prix
