= 1955 Pau Grand Prix =

- Non-championship race in the 1955 Formula One season

Race details
- Date: 11 April 1955
- Official name: XVI Pau Grand Prix
- Location: Pau, France
- Course: Temporary Street Circuit
- Course length: 2.760 km (1.720 miles)
- Distance: 110 laps, 303.840 km (188.540 miles)

Pole position
Driver	(Italy) Alberto Ascari	Lancia D50
- Time: 1:34.5

Fastest lap
Driver	(Italy) Alberto Ascari	Lancia D50
- Time: 1:35.3

Podium
First	(France) Jean Behra	Maserati 250F
Second	(Italy) Eugenio Castellotti	Lancia D50
Third	(Argentina) Roberto Mieres	Maserati 250F

The 1955 Pau Grand Prix was a non-championship Formula One motor race held on 11 April 1955 at the Pau circuit, in Pau, Pyrénées-Atlantiques, France. The Grand Prix was won by Jean Behra, driving the Maserati 250F. Eugenio Castellotti finished second and Roberto Mieres third.

1955 proved to be a crucial year for the Pau Grand Prix. Mario Alborghetti was killed in an accident on lap 19 of the Grand Prix. With the 1955 Le Mans disaster, worldwide ramifications led to the 1956 event not being run.

== Classification ==
=== Race ===
Pos	No	Driver	Vehicle	Laps	Time/Retired	Grid
1	14	(France) Jean Behra	Maserati 250F	110	3hrs 02min 09.6sec	2
2	10	(Italy) Eugenio Castellotti	Lancia D50	110	+ 1:01.0 s	5
3	16	(Argentina) Roberto Mieres	Maserati 250F	110	+ 1:31.5 s	3
4	8	(Italy) Luigi Villoresi	Lancia D50	109	+ 1 lap	4
5	6	(Italy) Alberto Ascari	Lancia D50	109	+ 1 lap	1
6	22	(France) André Simon	Maserati 250F	105	+ 5 laps	11
7	12	(France) Louis Rosier	Maserati 250F	104	+ 6 laps	10
8	30	(Spain) Alfonso de Portago	Ferrari 625	103	+ 7 laps	9
9	20	(France) Jean Lucas	Ferrari 500	97	+ 13 laps	12
10	26	(France) Paul Armagnac	DB Monomill	92	+ 18 laps	14
Ret	32	(France) Jacques Pollet	Gordini T16	80	Rear axle	13
Ret	24	(France) Claude Storez	DB Monomill	64	Mechanical	16
Ret	2	(France) Robert Manzon	Gordini T16	48	Brakes	7
Ret	4	(France) Élie Bayol	Gordini T16	35	Engine	8
Ret	18	(Italy) Luigi Musso	Maserati 250F	32	Valve	6
Ret	28	(Italy) Mario Alborghetti	Maserati 4CLT/48	19	Fatal accident	15
Fastest Lap: Alberto Ascari (Lancia D50) – 1:35.3

Previous race: 1955 Valentino Grand Prix	Formula One non-championship races 1955 season	Next race: 1955 Glover Trophy
Previous race: 1954 Pau Grand Prix	Pau Grand Prix	Next race: 1957 Pau Grand Prix
