= 1953 Bordeaux Grand Prix =

Race details
- Date: 3 May 1953
- Official name: II Grand Prix de Bordeaux
- Location: Bordeaux, France
- Course: Temporary Street Circuit
- Course length: 2.458 km (1.527 mi)
- Distance: 120 laps, 294.96 km (183.28 mi)

Pole position
Driver	(Italy) Luigi Villoresi	Ferrari
- Time: 1:23.6

Fastest lap
Driver	(Italy) Giuseppe Farina	Ferrari
- Time: 1:24.6

Podium
First	(Italy) Alberto Ascari	Ferrari
Second	(Italy) Luigi Villoresi	Ferrari
Third	(Argentina) Juan Manuel Fangio	Gordini

The 2nd Bordeaux Grand Prix was a non-championship Formula Two motor race held on 3 May 1953 on a street circuit centred around the Place des Quinconces in Bordeaux, Gironde, France. The Grand Prix was won by Alberto Ascari in a Ferrari 500. Ascari's teammate Luigi Villoresi, starting from pole, was second. Juan Manuel Fangio, in a one-off drive in a Gordini Type 16 at the personal invitation of Amédée Gordini, was third. Giuseppe Farina set fastest lap in another Ferrari 500 but retired with gearbox problems.

== Classification ==
=== Race ===
Pos	No	Driver	Entrant	Car	Time/Retired	Grid
1	4	(Italy) Alberto Ascari	Scuderia Ferrari	Ferrari 500	2:58:59.5, 101.35kph	2
2	8	(Italy) Luigi Villoresi	Scuderia Ferrari	Ferrari 500	+49.4s	1
3	24	(Argentina) Juan Manuel Fangio	Equipe Gordini	Gordini Type 16	+4 laps	8
4	22	(United States) Harry Schell	Equipe Gordini	Gordini Type 16	+5 laps	15
5	32	(France) Élie Bayol	Élie Bayol	O.S.C.A. Tipo 20	+7 laps	6
6	16	(Belgium) Johnny Claes	Ecurie Belge	Connaught Type A-Lea Francis	+8 laps	16
7	18	(Argentina) Roberto Mieres	Equipe Gordini	Gordini Type 16	+12 laps	13
8	12	(Thailand) B. Bira	HW Motors Ltd	HWM-Alta	+13 laps	14
Ret	28	(Switzerland) Emmanuel de Graffenried	Scuderia Enrico Platé	Maserati A6GCM	101 laps, rear axle	9
Ret	10	(United Kingdom) Lance Macklin	HW Motors Ltd	HWM-Alta	80 laps, starter	12
Ret	2	(France) Louis Rosier	Ecurie Rosier	Ferrari 500	75 laps, gearbox	7
Ret	20	(France) Maurice Trintignant	Equipe Gordini	Gordini Type 16	62 laps, half-shaft	3
Ret	6	(Italy) Giuseppe Farina	Scuderia Ferrari	Ferrari 500	57 laps, gearbox	4
Ret	14	(France) Yves Giraud-Cabantous	HW Motors Ltd	HWM-Alta	26 laps, clutch	11
Ret	26	(United Kingdom) Peter Whitehead	Atlantic Stable	Cooper T24-Alta	26 laps, clutch	10
DSQ	30	(France) Louis Chiron	Louis Chiron	O.S.C.A. Tipo 20	67 laps, push start	5
DNA	12	(United Kingdom) Peter Walker	HW Motors Ltd	HWM-Alta	car driven by Bira	
DNA	18	(France) André Simon	Equipe Gordini	Gordini Type 16	car driven by Mieres	
DNA	24	(Argentina) José Froilán González	Equipe Gordini	Gordini Type 16	car driven by Fangio	

Previous race: 1953 Aston Martin Owners Club Formula 2 Race	Formula One non-championship races 1953 season	Next race: 1953 BRDC International Trophy
Previous race: 1952 Bordeaux Grand Prix	Bordeaux Grand Prix	Next race: 1954 Bordeaux Grand Prix
