= 1956 Caen Grand Prix =

- Non-championship race in the 1956 Formula One season
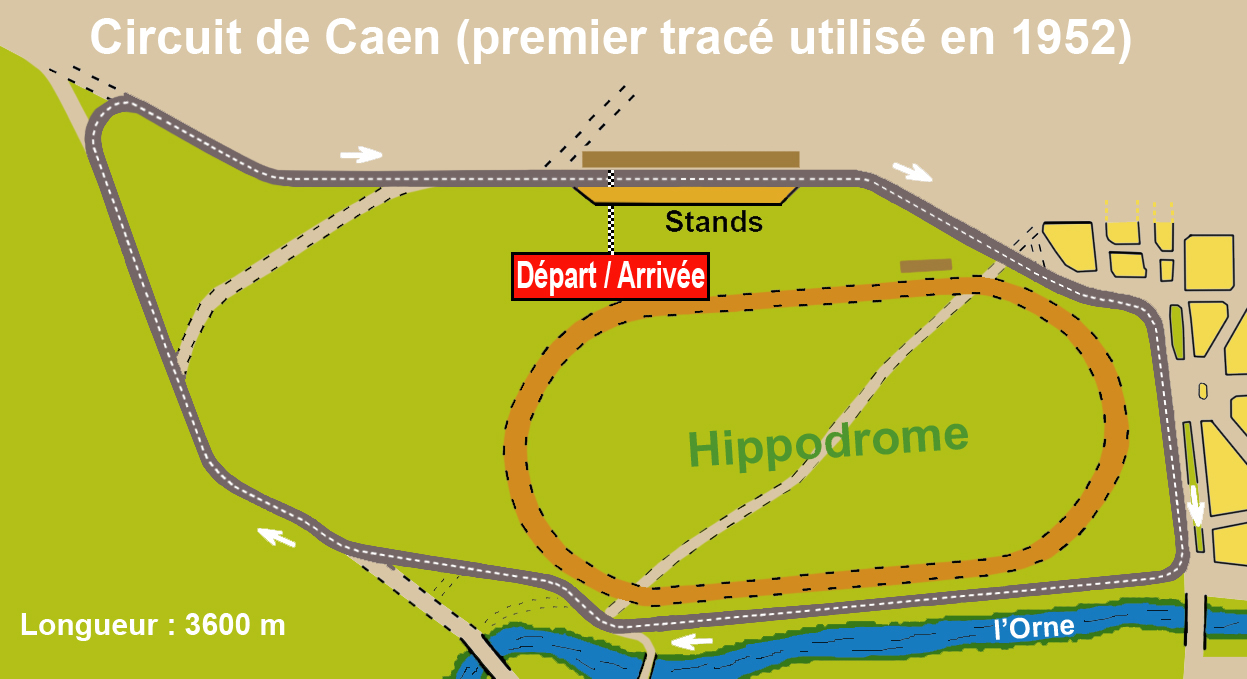

Race details
- Date: 26 August 1956
- Official name: IV Grand Prix de Caen
- Location: La Prairie, Caen, France
- Course: Temporary street circuit
- Course length: 3.52 km (2.19 miles)
- Distance: 70 laps, 244.98 km (153.11 miles)

Pole position
Driver	(United Kingdom) Roy Salvadori	Maserati

Fastest lap
Driver	(United Kingdom) Roy Salvadori	Maserati
- Time: 1:26.2

Podium
First	(United States) Harry Schell	Maserati
Second	(France) André Simon	Gordini
Third	(United Kingdom) Roy Salvadori	Maserati

The 1956 Caen Grand Prix was a motor race, run to Formula One rules, held on 26 August 1956 at the Circuit de la Prairie, Caen. The race was run in very wet conditions over 70 laps of the circuit, and was won by over a minute by American driver Harry Schell in a Maserati 250F. British driver Roy Salvadori set pole and fastest lap.

== Classification ==
Pos	No.	Driver	Entrant	Constructor	Time/Retired	Grid
1	16	(United States) Harry Schell	Officine Alfieri Maserati	Maserati 250F	1:54:19.4, 128.18 km/h	5
2	6	(France) André Simon	Équipe Gordini	Gordini Type 16	+79.7s	7
3	8	(United Kingdom) Roy Salvadori	Gilby Engineering Ltd.	Maserati 250F	69 laps	1
4	20	(France) Georges Burggraff	Équipe Gordini	Gordini Type 16	68 laps	9
5	14	(France) Jean Lucas	Circle Los Amigos	Ferrari 500	65 laps	8
6	26	(New Zealand) W.F. Morice	W.F. Morice	Cooper T23-Bristol	61 laps	12
7	44	(Italy) Aldo Pedini	Scuderia Centro Sud	Ferrari 500	55 laps	13
Ret	2	(France) Louis Rosier	Écurie Rosier	Maserati 250F	35 laps - accident	2
Ret	4	(France) Robert Manzon	Équipe Gordini	Gordini Type 32	31 laps - accident	4
Ret	22	(United Kingdom) Bruce Halford	Bruce Halford	Maserati 250F	21 laps - accident	3
Ret	20	(United Kingdom) Horace Gould	Gould's Garage Bristol	Maserati 250F	11 laps - accident	6
Ret	24	(United Kingdom) Paul Emery	Emeryson Cars	Emeryson-Alta	6 laps - engine	11
Ret	10	(Brazil) Hermano da Silva Ramos	Équipe Gordini	Gordini Type 32	1 lap - clutch	10

Previous race: 1956 Vanwall Trophy	Formula One non-championship races 1956 season	Next race: 1956 BRSCC Formula 1 Race
Previous race: 1954 Caen Grand Prix	Caen Grand Prix	Next race: 1957 Caen Grand Prix
