= 1957 Pau Grand Prix =

- Non-championship race in the 1957 Formula One season

Race details
- Date: 22 April 1957
- Official name: XVII Pau Grand Prix
- Location: Pau, France
- Course: Street Circuit
- Course length: 2.769 km (1.720 miles)
- Distance: 110 laps, 304.590 km (189.263 miles)

Pole position
Driver	(France) Jean Behra	Maserati
- Time: 1:35.7

Fastest lap
Driver	(France) Jean Behra	Maserati
- Time: 1:35.9

Podium
First	(France) Jean Behra	Maserati
Second	(United States) Harry Schell	Maserati
Third	(United Kingdom) Ivor Bueb	Connaught

The 1957 Pau Grand Prix was a non-championship Formula One race held at Pau on 22 April 1957. The 110-lap race was won by Maserati driver Jean Behra after starting from pole position. His teammate, Harry Schell, finished second and Connaught driver Ivor Bueb, came in third.

== Classification ==
Pos	No	Driver	Constructor	Laps	Time/Retired	Grid
1	2	(France) Jean Behra	Maserati	110	3:00:18.7	1
2	20	(United States) Harry Schell	Maserati	108	+ 2 laps	2
3	18	(United Kingdom) Ivor Bueb	Connaught	107	+ 3 laps	5
4	22	(United States) Masten Gregory	Maserati	106	+ 4 laps	3
5	16	(United Kingdom) Les Leston	Connaught	106	+ 4 laps	6
6	8	(Brazil) Hermano da Silva Ramos	Gordini	104	+ 6 laps	9
7	12	(France) André Guelfi	Gordini	103	+ 7 laps	10
8	26	(United Kingdom) Horace Gould	Maserati	96	+ 14 laps	12
Ret	6	(Italy) Luigi Piotti (Spain) Paco Godia	Maserati	0	Piston	14
Ret	10	(France) André Simon	Gordini	36	Magneto	11
Ret	28	(France) Maurice Trintignant (France) Marc Rozier	Ferrari	30	Engine	4
Ret	14	(France) Rene Bourely	Maserati	10	Driver illness	13
Ret	24	(United Kingdom) Bruce Halford	Maserati	10	Transmission	8
Ret	4	(Spain) Paco Godia	Maserati	4	Accident	7
DNS	32	(France) Georges Burgraff	Gordini		Non-starter	
DNQ	30	(France) Lucien Barthe	Maserati			

Previous race: 1957 Syracuse Grand Prix	Formula One non-championship races 1957 season	Next race: 1957 Glover Trophy
Previous race: 1955 Pau Grand Prix	Pau Grand Prix	Next race: 1958 Pau Grand Prix
