= 1953 Rouen Grand Prix =

- Non-championship race in the 1953 Formula One season
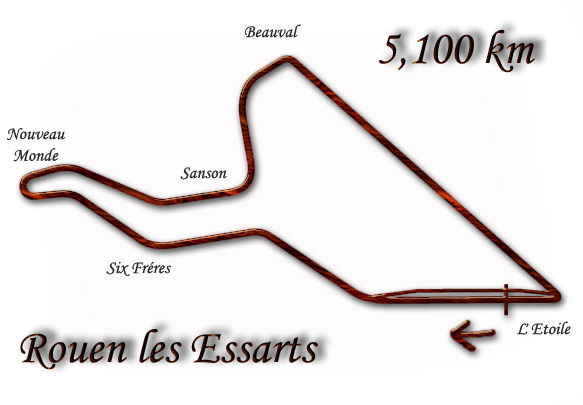

Race details
- Date: 28 June 1953
- Official name: III Grand Prix de Rouen-les-Essarts
- Location: Rouen-Les-Essarts, Orival, Seine-Maritime
- Course: Temporary Road Circuit
- Course length: 5.100 km (3.169 mi)
- Distance: 60 laps, 306.023 km (190.154 mi)

Pole position
Driver	(Italy) Giuseppe Farina	Ferrari
- Time: 2:12.2

Fastest lap
Driver	(United Kingdom) Mike Hawthorn	Ferrari
- Time: 2:12.8

Podium
First	(Italy) Giuseppe Farina	Ferrari
Second	(United Kingdom) Mike Hawthorn	Ferrari
Third	(France) Philippe Étancelin	Talbot-Lago

The III Grand Prix de Rouen-les-Essarts was a combined Formula One and Formula Two motor race held on 28 June 1953 at the Rouen-Les-Essarts circuit. The race was held over 60 laps and was won from pole position by Giuseppe Farina in a Ferrari 625. Teammate Mike Hawthorn was second and set fastest lap, and Philippe Étancelin was third in a Talbot-Lago T26C, the highest Formula One finisher.

== Classification ==
Formula One competitors highlighted in blue.

Pos	No.	Driver	Entrant	Car	Time/Retired	Grid
1	2	(Italy) Giuseppe Farina	Scuderia Ferrari	Ferrari 625	2:!5:05.8, 135.92 kph	1
2	4	(United Kingdom) Mike Hawthorn	Scuderia Ferrari	Ferrari 625	+1.2s	2
3	6	(France) Philippe Étancelin	Philippe Étancelin	Talbot-Lago T26C	+3 laps	10
4	14	(United States) Harry Schell	Equipe Gordini	Gordini Type 16	+3 laps	7
5	8	(France) Pierre Levegh	Pierre Levegh	Talbot-Lago T26C	+4 laps	11
6	14	(France) Georges Grignard	Georges Grignard	Talbot-Lago T26C	+4 laps	9
7	20	(France) Louis Rosier	Ecurie Rosier	Ferrari 375	+4 laps	4
8	18	(United Kingdom) Bob Gerard	F.R. Gerard	Cooper T23-Bristol	+4 laps	14
9	26	(United Kingdom) John Lyons	William Knight	Connaught Type A-Lea Francis	+6 laps	8
10	16	(United Kingdom) Stirling Moss	R.R.C. Walker Racing Team	Cooper T24-Alta	+7 laps	12
Ret.	12	(France) Maurice Trintignant	Equipe Gordini	Gordini Type 16	30 laps, rear axle	3
Ret.	24	(Belgium) Johnny Claes	Ecurie Belge	Connaught Type A-Lea Francis	27 laps, rear axle	15
Ret.	10	(France) Jean Behra	Equipe Gordini	Gordini Type 16	19 laps, steering	5
Ret.	30	(France) Yves Giraud-Cabantous	Yves Giraud-Cabantous	Talbot-Lago T26C	4 laps, transmission	13
Ret.	34	(France) Élie Bayol	Élie Bayol	O.S.C.A. Tipo 20	0 laps, gearbox	6
DNS	32	(Switzerland) Ottorino Volonterio	Ottorino Volonterio	Maserati 4CLT/48		
DNA	16	(United Kingdom) Stirling Moss	R.R.C. Walker Racing Team	Connaught Type A-Lea Francis	drove the Cooper-Alta	
DNA	22	(Thailand) B. Bira	Ecurie Siam	Maserati A6GCM		
DNA	20	(France) Louis Rosier	Ecurie Rosier	Ferrari 500	drove the Ferrari 375	

Previous race: 1953 Midlands MECC Race	Formula One non-championship races 1953 season	Next race: 1953 Crystal Palace Trophy
Previous race: 1952 Rouen Grand Prix	Rouen Grand Prix	Next race: 1954 Rouen Grand Prix
