= 1953 Pau Grand Prix =

Race details
- Date: 6 April 1953
- Official name: XIV Pau Grand Prix
- Location: Pau, France
- Course: Temporary Street Circuit
- Course length: 2.760 km (1.720 miles)
- Distance: 106 laps, 300.410 km (186.666 miles)

Pole position
Driver	(Italy) Alberto Ascari	Scuderia Ferrari
- Time: 1:39.2

Fastest lap
Driver	(Italy) Alberto Ascari	Scuderia Ferrari
- Time: 1:38.9

Podium
First	(Italy) Alberto Ascari	Scuderia Ferrari
Second	(United Kingdom) Mike Hawthorn	Scuderia Ferrari
Third	(United States) Harry Schell	Equipe Gordini

The 1953 Pau Grand Prix was a Formula Two motor race held on 6 April 1953 at the Pau circuit, in Pau, Pyrénées-Atlantiques, France. The Grand Prix was won by Alberto Ascari for the second year running, driving the Ferrari 500. Mike Hawthorn finished second and Harry Schell third.

== Classification ==
=== Race ===
Pos	No	Driver	Vehicle	Laps	Time/Retired	Grid
1	6	(Italy) Alberto Ascari	Ferrari 500	106		1
2	10	(United Kingdom) Mike Hawthorn	Ferrari 500	105	+ 1 lap	3
3	22	(United States) Harry Schell	Gordini T16	102	+ 4 laps	11
4	28	(France) Élie Bayol	O.S.C.A. 20	102	+ 4 laps	7
5	12	(France) Louis Rosier	Ferrari 500	101	+ 5 laps	10
6	26	(Monaco) Louis Chiron	O.S.C.A. 20	99	+ 7 laps	6
7	32	(Italy) Nello Pagani	Maserati A6GCM	98	+ 8 laps	13
8	14	(Belgium) Roger Laurent	Ferrari 500	96	+ 10 laps	12
9	30	(France) Eugène Martin	Veritas Jicey 2	81	+ 15 laps	14
Ret	20	(France) Maurice Trintignant	Gordini T16	75	Retired	5
Ret	16	(Belgium) Johnny Claes	Connaught Type A-Lea Francis	65	Spun-off	8
Ret	24	(France) Andre Simon	Gordini T16	44	Driver illness	9
Ret	8	(Italy) Giuseppe Farina	Ferrari 500	33	Accident	2
Ret	18	(France) Jean Behra	Gordini T16	6	Accident	4
DNA	2	(United Kingdom) Lance Macklin	HWM 53-Alta		Did Not Attend	
DNA	4	(France) Yves Giraud-Cabantous	HWM 53-Alta		Did Not Attend	
Fastest Lap: Alberto Ascari (Scuderia Ferrari) – 1:38.9

Previous race: 1953 Syracuse Grand Prix	Formula One non-championship races 1953 season	Next race: 1953 Lavant Cup
Previous race: 1952 Pau Grand Prix	Pau Grand Prix	Next race: 1954 Pau Grand Prix
