= 1957 Caen Grand Prix =

- Non-championship race in the 1957 Formula One season
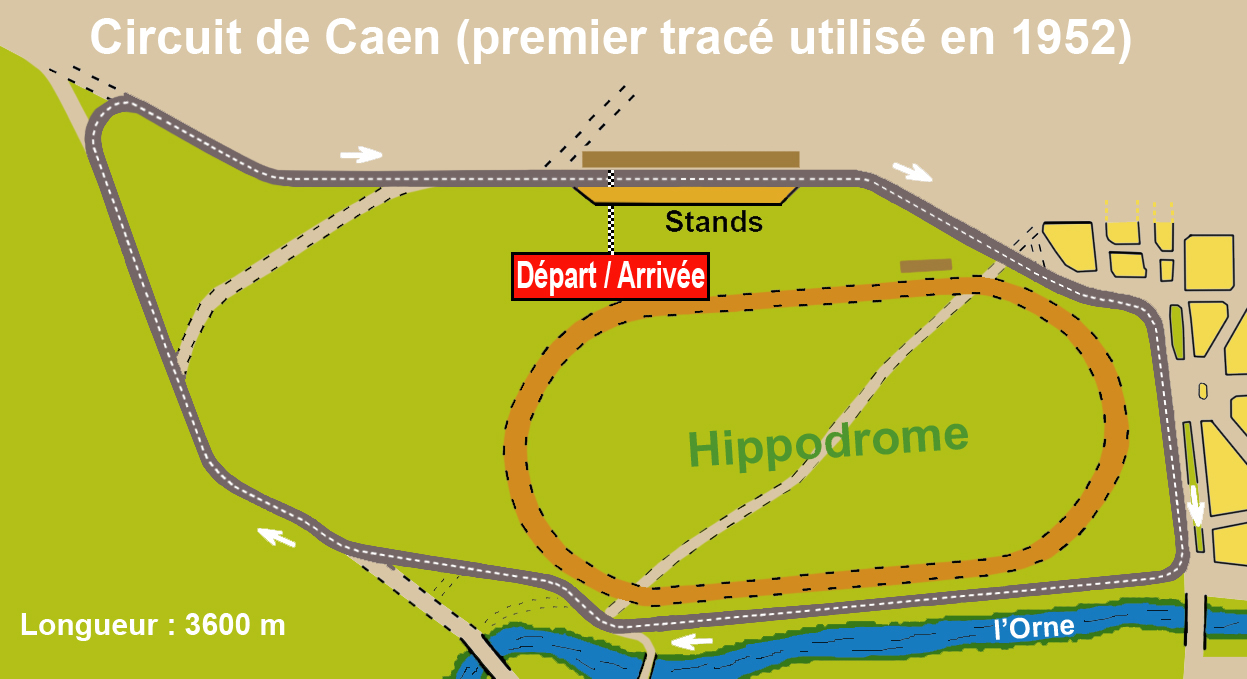

Race details
- Date: 28 July 1957
- Official name: V Grand Prix de Caen
- Location: La Prairie, Caen, France
- Course: Temporary street circuit
- Course length: 3.52 km (2.19 miles)
- Distance: 86 laps, 302.72 km (188.08 miles)

Pole position
Driver	(France) Jean Behra	BRM
- Time: 1:21.1

Fastest lap
Driver	(France) Jean Behra	BRM
- Time: 1:20.7

Podium
First	(France) Jean Behra	BRM
Second	(United Kingdom) Roy Salvadori	Cooper-Climax
Third	(United Kingdom) Bruce Halford	Maserati

The 1957 Caen Grand Prix was a motor race, run to Formula One rules, held on 28 July 1957 at the Circuit de la Prairie, Caen. The race was run over 86 laps of the circuit, and was won by a lap by French driver Jean Behra in a BRM P25, the first Grand Prix win for the P25. Behra also set pole and fastest lap.

== Classification ==
Pos	No.	Driver	Entrant	Constructor	Time/Retired	Grid
1	2	(France) Jean Behra	Owen Racing Organisation	BRM P25	2:01:55, 149.39 km/h	1
2	10	(United Kingdom) Roy Salvadori	Cooper Car Company	Cooper T43-Climax	85 laps	3
3	18	(United Kingdom) Bruce Halford	Bruce Halford	Maserati 250F	85 laps	4
4	20	(Sweden) Jo Bonnier	Jo Bonnier	Maserati 250F	81 laps	6
5	14	(United Kingdom) Horace Gould	Horace Gould	Maserati 250F	80 laps	7
6	22	(Italy) Luigi Piotti	Luigi Piotti	Maserati 250F	78 laps	9
7	16	(France) Jean Lucas	Équipe Alan Brown	Cooper T43-Climax	72 laps	10
Ret	2	(United States) Harry Schell^{1}	Owen Racing Organisation	BRM P25	58 laps - engine	5
Ret	8	(United Kingdom) Tony Brooks	R.R.C. Walker Racing Team	Cooper T43-Climax	29 laps - clutch	2
Ret	28	(France) Marc Rozier	Marc Rozier	Ferrari 500	13 laps - mechanical	11
Ret	12	(Australia) Jack Brabham	Cooper Car Company	Cooper T43-Climax	2 laps - magneto	8

^{1} Schell raced the spare BRM after his Maserati 250F broke a piston during practice.

Previous race: 1957 Reims Grand Prix	Formula One non-championship races 1957 season	Next race: 1957 BRDC International Trophy
Previous race: 1956 Caen Grand Prix	Caen Grand Prix	Next race: 1958 Caen Grand Prix
