= 1954 Bordeaux Grand Prix =

- Non-championship race in the 1954 Formula One season

Race details
- Date: 9 May 1954
- Official name: III Grand Prix de Bordeaux
- Location: Bordeaux, France
- Course: Temporary Street Circuit
- Course length: 2.458 km (1.532 miles)
- Distance: 123 laps, 302.334 km (188.488 miles)

Pole position
Driver	(France) Maurice Trintignant	Ferrari
- Time: 1:21.8

Fastest lap
Driver	(Argentina) José Froilán González	Ferrari
- Time: 1:22.7

Podium
First	(Argentina) José Froilán González	Ferrari
Second	(France) Robert Manzon	Ferrari
Third	(France) Maurice Trintignant	Ferrari

The 1954 Bordeaux Grand Prix was a non-championship Formula One motor race held on 9 May 1954 on a street circuit centred around the Place des Quinconces in Bordeaux, Gironde, France. The Grand Prix was won by José Froilán González, driving with Ferrari. Gonzalez also set fastest lap. Ferrari drivers Robert Manzon and Maurice Trintignant finished second and third, with Trintignant starting from pole.

== Classification ==
=== Race ===
Pos	No	Driver	Entrant	Car	Time/Retired	Grid
1	12	(Argentina) José Froilán González	Scuderia Ferrari	Ferrari 625	3:05:55.1, 07.23kph	2
2	24	(France) Robert Manzon	Equipe Rosier	Ferrari 625	+44.5s	5
3	14	(France) Maurice Trintignant	Scuderia Ferrari	Ferrari 625	+1:03.0	1
4	7	(United Kingdom) Stirling Moss	A.E. Moss	Maserati 250F	+2 laps	7
5	4	(France) Elie Bayol	Equipe Gordini	Gordini T16	+4 laps	6
6	6	(France) Jacques Pollet	Equipe Gordini	Gordini T16	+7 laps	9
7	8	(France) Georges Berger	Equipe Gordini	Gordini T16	+13 laps	11
Ret	18	(Thailand) B. Bira	Prince Bira	Maserati A6GCM	44 laps, oil system	4
Ret	2	(France) Jean Behra	Equipe Gordini	Gordini T16	34 laps, gearbox	3
Ret	22	(United States) Harry Schell	Harry Schell	Maserati A6GCM	16 laps, clutch	8
Ret	16	(France) Louis Rosier	Equipe Rosier	Ferrari 500	9 laps, engine	10
Ret	10	(United Kingdom) Peter Whitehead	Peter N. Whitehead	Cooper T24-Alta	4 laps, engine	12
DNS	20	(Argentina) Roberto Mieres	Roberto Mieres	Maserati A6GCM	Practice crash	-

Previous race: 1954 Lavant Cup	Formula One non-championship races 1954 season	Next race: 1954 BRDC International Trophy
Previous race: 1953 Bordeaux Grand Prix	Bordeaux Grand Prix	Next race: 1955 Bordeaux Grand Prix
