= 1952 Sables Grand Prix =

Race details
- Date: 13 July 1952
- Official name: II Grand Prix de Sables d'Olonne
- Location: Les Sables-d'Olonne, Pays de la Loire, France
- Course: Temporary street circuit
- Course length: 2.350 km (1.460 mi)
- Distance: 136 laps, 319.60 km (198.59 mi)

Pole position
Driver	(Italy) Alberto Ascari	Ferrari
- Time: 1:12.9

Fastest lap
Driver	(Italy) Alberto Ascari	Ferrari
- Time: 1:12.3

Podium
First	(Italy) Luigi Villoresi	Ferrari
Second	(United Kingdom) Peter Collins	HWM-Alta
Third	(Belgium) Johnny Claes	Gordini

The 2nd Grand Prix de Sables d'Olonne was a Formula Two motor race held on 13 July 1952 at Les Sables-d'Olonne, in Pays de la Loire, France. It was round 6 of Les Grands Prix de France Formula Two Championship. Race distance was decided not by distance but by time, the duration being 3 hours. The race was won by Luigi Villoresi in a Ferrari 500. Peter Collins was second in an HWM-Alta and Johnny Claes third in a Simca Gordini Type 15. Alberto Ascari started from pole in a Ferrari 500 and set fastest lap but crashed and retired.

== Results ==
Pos	No.	Driver	Entrant	Constructor	Time/Retired	Grid
1	12	(Italy) Luigi Villoresi	Scuderia Ferrari	Ferrari 500	136 laps, 106.47 kph	4
2	22	(United Kingdom) Peter Collins	HW Motors Ltd	HWM-Alta	+3 laps	8
3	32	(Belgium) Johnny Claes	Equipe Belge	Simca Gordini Type 15	+5 laps	15
4	6	(Thailand) B. Bira (France) Robert Manzon	Equipe Gordini	Simca Gordini Type 15	+7 laps	6
NC	24	(France) Yves Giraud-Cabantous	HW Motors Ltd	HWM-Alta	+12 laps, magneto	11
NC	2	(France) Robert Manzon (France) Maurice Trintignant	Equipe Gordini	Gordini Type 16	+27 laps	3
Ret	34	(Switzerland) Rudi Fischer	Ecurie Espadon	Ferrari 500	102 laps, mechanical	12
Ret	20	(United Kingdom) Lance Macklin	HW Motors Ltd	HWM-Alta	88 laps, engine	7
Ret	16	(Switzerland) Emmanuel de Graffenried	Scuderia Enrico Platé	Maserati 4CLT/48	46 laps, engine	9
Ret	8	(Italy) Alberto Ascari	Scuderia Ferrari	Ferrari 500	45 laps, crash	1
Ret	10	(Italy) Giuseppe Farina	Scuderia Ferrari	Ferrari 500	44 laps, crash	2
Ret	14	(Belgium) Maurice Trintignant	Equipe Gordini	Simca Gordini Type 15	42 laps, crash	5
Ret	28	(Uruguay) Eitel Cantoni	Escuderia Bandeirantes	Maserati A6GCM	42 laps, crash	14
Ret	18	(United States) Harry Schell	Scuderia Enrico Platé	Maserati 4CLT/48	41 laps, engine/crash	10
DNS	4	(France) Jean Behra	Equipe Gordini	Gordini Type 16	crash	13
DNA	26	(United Kingdom) Peter Whitehead	Peter Whitehead	Alta F2	car not ready	-
DNA	30	(Italy) Gino Bianco	Escuderia Bandeirantes	Maserati A6GCM	car not ready	-

Previous race: 1952 Marne Grand Prix	Formula One non-championship races 1952 season	Next race: 1952 Caen Grand Prix
Previous race: 1951 Sables Grand Prix	Sables Grand Prix	Next race: 1953 Sables Grand Prix
