= 1953 Sables Grand Prix =

Race details
- Date: 9 August 1953
- Official name: III Grand Prix de Sables d'Olonne
- Location: Les Sables-d'Olonne, Pays de la Loire, France
- Course: Temporary street circuit
- Course length: 2.949 km (1.832 mi)
- Distance: 90 laps, 265.36 km (164.89 mi)

Podium
| First | (France) Louis Rosier | Ferrari |
| Second | (Monaco) Louis Chiron | O.S.C.A. |
| Third | (United Kingdom) Stirling Moss | Cooper-Alta |

The 3rd Grand Prix de Sables d'Olonne was a Formula Two motor race held on 9 August 1953 at Les Sables-d'Olonne, in Pays de la Loire, France. The race was held over two heats of 45 laps each, with the result being decided by aggregate time. The overall winner was Louis Rosier in a Ferrari 500. Louis Chiron was second in an O.S.C.A. Tipo 20 and Stirling Moss third in a Cooper T24-Alta. Jean Behra and Maurice Trintignant were the winners of heat 1 and 2 respectively, both driving a Gordini Type 16, but both retired from the other heat.

== Results ==
| Pos | No. | Driver | Entrant | Constructor | Time/Retired | Heat 1 | Heat 2 |
|---|---|---|---|---|---|---|---|
| 1 | 8 | (France) Louis Rosier | Ecurie Rosier | Ferrari 500 | 2:12:56.1, 119.78 kph | 3 | 2 |
| 2 | 10 | (Monaco) Louis Chiron | Louis Chiron | O.S.C.A. Tipo 20 | +27.4s | 2 | 3 |
| 3 | 18 | (United Kingdom) Stirling Moss | Cooper Car Company | Cooper T24-Alta | 87 laps | 4 | 5 |
| 4 | 16 | (France) Yves Giraud-Cabantous | HW Motors Ltd | HWM-Alta | 86 laps | 6 | 4 |
| 5 | 2 | (France) Jean Behra | Equipe Gordini | Gordini Type 16 | 78 laps | 1 | NC |
| 6 | 12 | (United Kingdom) Peter Collins | HW Motors Ltd | HWM-Alta | 78 laps | NC | 6 |
| 7 | 14 | (United Kingdom) Lance Macklin | HW Motors Ltd | HWM-Alta | 68 laps | Ret., engine | NC |
| 8 | 4 | (France) Maurice Trintignant | Equipe Gordini | Gordini Type 16 | 65 laps | Ret., 20 laps, transmission | 1 |
| NC | 6 | (United States) Harry Schell | Equipe Gordini | Gordini Type 16 | 50 laps | 5 | Ret., 6 laps, lost wheel |
| NC | 20 | (France) Élie Bayol | Élie Bayol | O.S.C.A. Tipo 20 | 40 laps | 7 | Ret. |
| NC | 22 | (Belgium) Johnny Claes | Ecurie Belge | Connaught Type A-Lea Francis | 26 laps | Ret., 26 laps, magneto | DNS |
| NC | 24 | (Belgium) André Pilette | Ecurie Belge | Maserati A6GCM | 24 laps | Ret. | DNS |

| Previous race: 1953 Mid-Cheshire MC Race | Formula One non-championship races 1953 season | Next race: 1953 Newcastle Journal Trophy |
| Previous race: 1952 Sables Grand Prix | Sables Grand Prix | Next race: — |
