= 1958 Caen Grand Prix =

- Non-championship race in the 1958 Formula One season
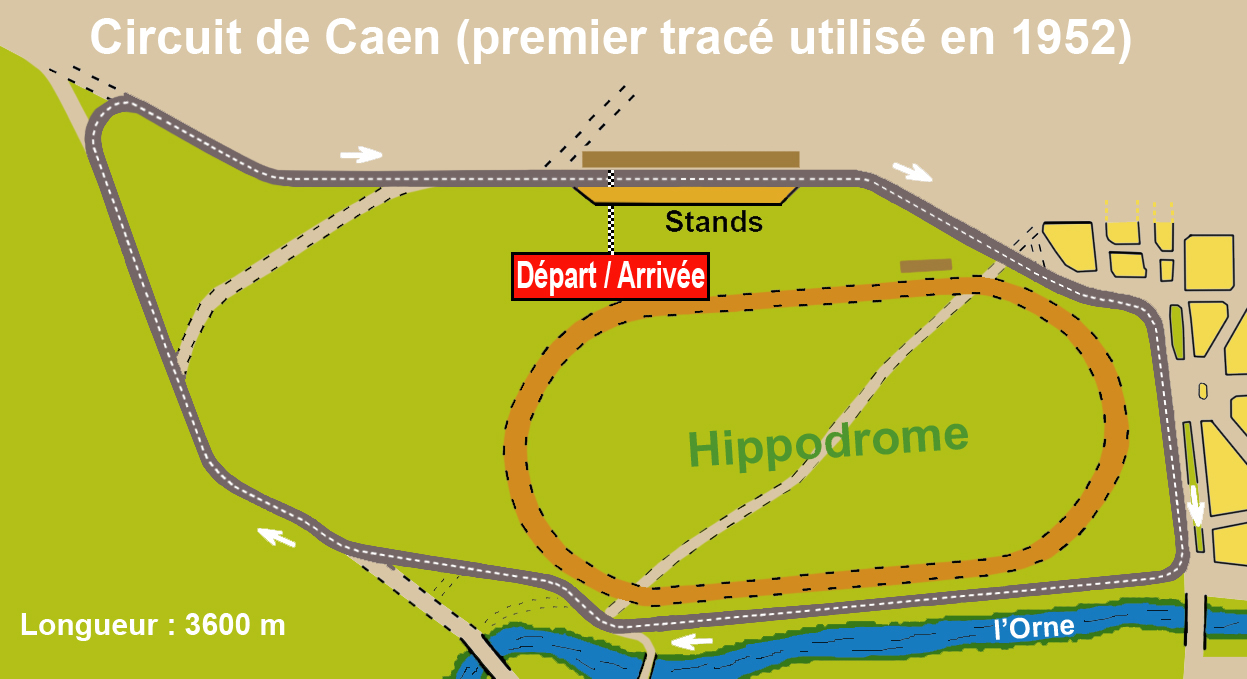

Race details
- Date: July 20, 1958
- Official name: VI Grand Prix de Caen
- Location: La Prairie, Caen, France
- Course: Grand Prix Circuit
- Course length: 3.52 km (2.187 miles)
- Distance: 86 laps, 302.72 km (188.08 miles)

Pole position
| Driver | (United Kingdom) Stirling Moss | Cooper-Climax |

Fastest lap
| Driver | (France) Jean Behra | BRM |
- Time: 1:20.8

Podium
| First | (United Kingdom) Stirling Moss | Cooper-Climax |
| Second | (Sweden) Jo Bonnier | Maserati |
| Third | (United Kingdom) Bruce Halford | Maserati |

The 1958 Caen Grand Prix was a motor race, run to Formula One rules, held on 20 July 1958 at the Circuit de la Prairie, Caen. The race was run over 86 laps of the circuit, and was won by British driver Stirling Moss who lapped the field in a Cooper T45.

== Classification ==
| Pos | No. | Driver | Entrant | Constructor | Time/Retired | Grid |
|---|---|---|---|---|---|---|
| 1 | 4 | (United Kingdom) Stirling Moss | R. R. C. Walker Racing Team | Cooper T45-Climax | 2:00:09.7, 151.18 km/h | 1 |
| 2 | 12 | (Sweden) Jo Bonnier | Joakim Bonnier | Maserati 250F | 85 laps | 6 |
| 3 | 16 | (United Kingdom) Bruce Halford | Bruce Halford | Maserati 250F | 85 laps | 4 |
| 4 | 8 | (France) Maurice Trintignant | R. R. C. Walker Racing Team | Cooper T43-Climax | 84 laps | 5 |
| 5 | | (United Kingdom) Stuart Lewis-Evans | British Racing Partnership | Cooper T43-Climax | 82 laps | 10 |
| 6 | 14 | (Italy) Gerino Gerini | Scuderia Centro Sud | Maserati 250F | 82 laps | 11 |
| 7 | | (United Kingdom) George Wicken | George Wicken | Cooper T43-Climax | 82 laps | 7 |
| Ret | 2 | (France) Jean Behra | Owen Racing Organisation | BRM P25 | Engine | 2 |
| Ret | 6 | (United States) Harry Schell | Owen Racing Organisation | BRM P25 | Gearbox oil leak | 8 |
| Ret | | (United Kingdom) Dick Gibson | Dick Gibson | Cooper T43-Climax | Overheating | 3 |
| Ret | | (United Kingdom) Keith Ballisat | Dick Gibson | Cooper T43-Climax | 1 lap - lost wheel | 9 |
| Ret | | (United Kingdom) Les Leston | John Fisher | Lotus 12-Climax | 1 lap - accident | 12 |

| Previous race: 1958 BRDC International Trophy | Formula One non-championship races 1958 season | Next race: 1959 Glover Trophy |
| Previous race: 1957 Caen Grand Prix | Caen Grand Prix | Next race: — |
