= 1956 BRDC International Trophy =

- Non-championship race in the 1956 Formula One season
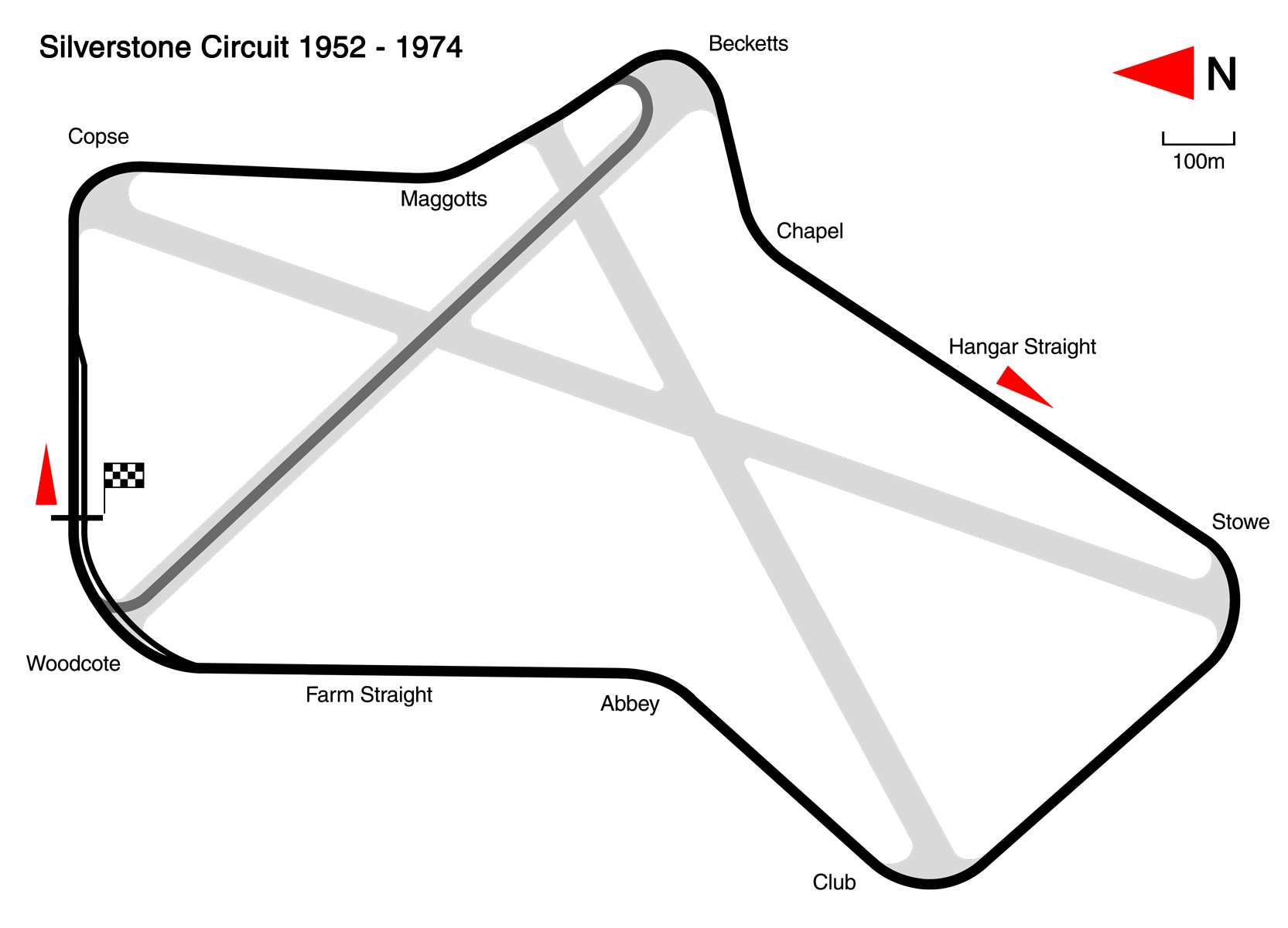

Race details
- Date: 5 May 1956
- Official name: VIII BRDC International Trophy
- Location: Silverstone Circuit, Northamptonshire
- Course: Permanent racing facility
- Course length: 4.71 km (2.93 miles)
- Distance: 60 laps, 282.60 km (175.59 miles)

Pole position
| Driver | (United Kingdom) Stirling Moss | Vanwall |
- Time: 1:42

Fastest lap
| Drivers | (United Kingdom) Mike Hawthorn | BRM |
| | (United Kingdom) Stirling Moss | Vanwall |
- Time: 1:43

Podium
| First | (United Kingdom) Stirling Moss | Vanwall |
| Second | (United Kingdom) Archie Scott-Brown | Connaught Type B |
| Third | (United Kingdom) Desmond Titterington | Connaught Type B |

The 8th BRDC International Trophy – formally the International Daily Express Trophy – was a motor race, run to Formula One rules, held on 5 May 1956 at Silverstone Circuit, Northamptonshire. The race was run over 60 laps, and was won by a lap by British driver Stirling Moss in a Vanwall. Moss also took pole, and shared fastest lap with BRM driver Mike Hawthorn.

== Results ==
| Pos. | No. | Driver | Entrant | Car | Time/Retired | Grid |
|---|---|---|---|---|---|---|
| 1 | 3 | (United Kingdom) Stirling Moss | Vandervell Products | Vanwall | 1h44m53, 161.70 km/h | 1 |
| 2 | 5 | (United Kingdom) Archie Scott-Brown | Connaught Engineering | Connaught Type B-Alta | 59 laps | 7 |
| 3 | 6 | (United Kingdom) Desmond Titterington | Connaught Engineering | Connaught Type B-Alta | 57 laps | 8 |
| 4 | 25 | (United Kingdom) Bob Gerard | Bob Gerard Racing | Cooper T23-Bristol | 56 laps | 6 |
| 5 | 11 | (Brazil) Hermano da Silva Ramos | Equipe Gordini | Gordini Type 16 | 56 laps | 12 |
| 6 | 12 | (France) Louis Rosier | Ecurie Rosier | Maserati 250F | 54 laps | 19 |
| 7 | 20 | (Italy) Piero Scotti | Connaught Engineering | Connaught Type B-Alta | 53 laps | 15 |
| 8 | 22 | (United Kingdom) Dick Gibson | Dick Gibson | Connaught Type A-Lea Francis | 48 laps | 17 |
| 9 | 15 | (United Kingdom) Roy Salvadori | Gilby Engineering | Maserati 250F | 47 laps | 6 |
| 10 | 23 | (United Kingdom) Bill Holt | Bill Holt | Connaught Type A-Lea Francis | 47 laps | 18 |
| DSQ | 16 | (Australia) Jack Brabham | J.A. Brabham | Maserati 250F | 37 laps - oil leak | 14 |
| Ret | 24 | (United Kingdom) John Young | John Young | Connaught Type A-Lea Francis | 39 laps - engine | 16 |
| Ret | 10 | (Belgium) André Pilette | Equipe Gordini | Gordini Type 32 | 37 laps | 13 |
| Ret | 2 | (United Kingdom) Peter Collins (Argentina) Juan Manuel Fangio | Scuderia Ferrari | Lancia-Ferrari D50 | 27 laps - clutch | 5 |
| Ret | 19 | (United Kingdom) Mike Oliver | Connaught Engineering | Connaught Type B-Alta | 24 laps - accident | 21 |
| Ret | 1 | (Argentina) Juan Manuel Fangio | Scuderia Ferrari | Lancia-Ferrari D50 | 20 laps - clutch | 3 |
| Ret | 7 | (United Kingdom) Jack Fairman | Connaught Engineering | Connaught Type B-Alta | 19 laps - engine | 9 |
| Ret | 4 | (United States) Harry Schell | Vandervell Products | Vanwall | 19 laps - fuel pipe | 2 |
| Ret | 9 | (United Kingdom) Mike Hawthorn | Owen Racing Organisation | BRM P25 | 13 laps - magneto | 4 |
| Ret | 17 | (United Kingdom) Reg Parnell | R.R.C. Walker Racing Team | Connaught Type B-Alta | 0 laps - gearbox | 10 |
| DNS | 21 | (United Kingdom) Bruce Halford | Bruce Halford | Maserati 250F | | 20 |
| DNS | 26 | (United Kingdom) Jock Somervail | Alastair Birrell | Cooper T20-Bristol | | |
| DNA | 3 | (France) Maurice Trintignant | Vandervell Products | Vanwall | | |
| DNA | 14 | (United Kingdom) Ken Wharton | Ecurie Rosier | Ferrari 500 | | |
| DNA | 18 | (United Kingdom) Stirling Moss | Stirling Moss Ltd | Maserati 250F | Drove car #3 | |
| DNA | 19 | (Italy) Luigi Piotti | Luigi Piotti | Maserati 250F | | |
| DNA | 19 | (United Kingdom) John Coombs | John Coombs | Connaught Type A-Lea Francis | | |
| DNA | 19 | (United Kingdom) Alastair Birrell | Alastair Birrell | Cooper T20-Bristol | | |

| Previous race: 1956 BARC Aintree 200 | Formula One non-championship races 1956 season | Next race: 1956 Naples Grand Prix |
| Previous race: 1955 BRDC International Trophy | BRDC International Trophy | Next race: 1957 BRDC International Trophy |
