= 1951 Bari Grand Prix =

- Non-championship race in the 1951 Formula One season
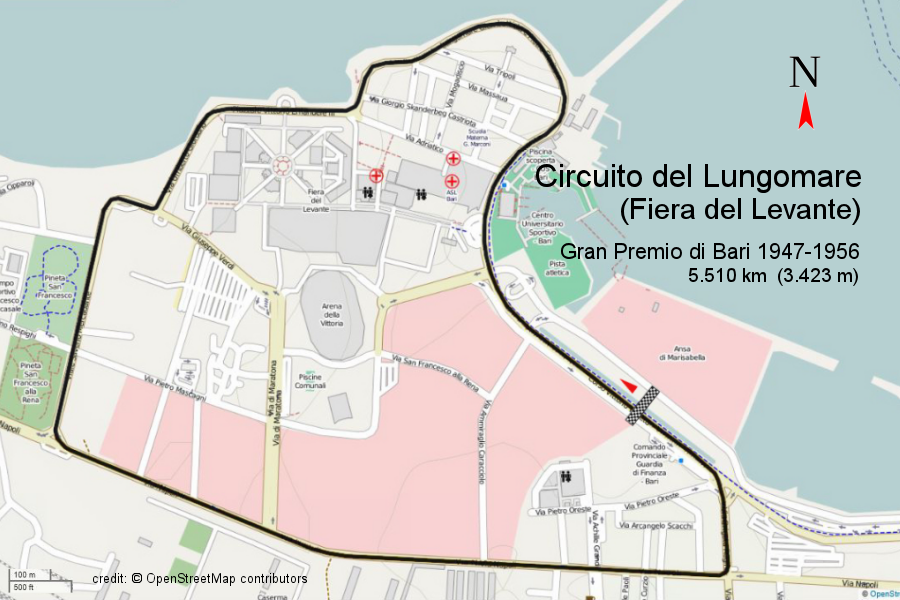

Race details
- Date: 2 September 1951
- Official name: V Gran Premio di Bari
- Location: Lungomare Circuit, Bari, Italy
- Course length: 5.538 km (3.452 miles)
- Distance: 65 laps, 359.988 km (224.431 miles)

Pole position
| Driver | (Argentina) Juan Manuel Fangio | Alfa Romeo |
- Time: 2:20.2

Fastest lap
| Driver | (Argentina) Juan Manuel Fangio | Alfa Romeo |
- Time: 2:20.6

Podium
| First | (Argentina) Juan Manuel Fangio | Alfa Romeo |
| Second | (Argentina) José Froilán González | Ferrari |
| Third | (Italy) Piero Taruffi | Ferrari |

The 1951 Bari Grand Prix was a non-championship Formula One motor race held on 2 September 1951 at the Lungomare Circuit, in Bari, Italy. The 65-lap race was won by Alfa Romeo driver Juan Manuel Fangio. Fangio also set pole position and fastest lap. Ferrari drivers José Froilán González and Piero Taruffi finished second and third.

== Results ==
| Pos | No. | Driver | Entrant | Car | Time/Retired | Grid |
|---|---|---|---|---|---|---|
| 1 | 4 | (Argentina) Juan Manuel Fangio | Alfa Corse | Alfa Romeo 159 | 2.39:58.6, 135.018 kph | 1 |
| 2 | 10 | (Argentina) José Froilán González | Scuderia Ferrari | Ferrari 375 | + 72.4 s | 3 |
| 3 | 20 | (Italy) Piero Taruffi | Scuderia Ferrari | Ferrari 500 | +3 laps | 11 |
| 4 | 6 | (France) Louis Rosier | Ecurie Rosier | Talbot-Lago T26C | +4 laps | 8 |
| 5 | 36 | (France) Yves Giraud-Cabantous | Yves Giraud-Cabantous | Talbot-Lago T26C | +5 laps | 10 |
| 6 | 32 | (United Kingdom) Peter Whitehead | Peter Whitehead | Ferrari 125 | +5 laps | 17 |
| 7 | 22 | (France) Pierre Levegh | Pierre Levegh | Talbot-Lago T26C | +7 laps | 13 |
| 8 | 42 | (Belgium) Johnny Claes | Ecurie Belge | Talbot-Lago T26C | +7 laps | 15 |
| NC | 46 | (Switzerland) Emmanuel de Graffenried | Enrico Platé | Maserati 4CLT/48 | +8 laps | 18 |
| Ret | 40 | (France) Robert Manzon | Equipe Gordini | Simca-Gordini Type 15 | 39 laps, lubrication | 12 |
| Ret | 14 | (France) Maurice Trintignant | Equipe Gordini | Simca-Gordini Type 15 | 35 laps, piston | 14 |
| Ret | 8 | (Italy) Luigi Villoresi | Scuderia Ferrari | Ferrari 375 | 31 laps, oil tank | 5 |
| Ret | 2 | (Italy) Alberto Ascari | Scuderia Ferrari | Ferrari 375 | 18 laps, fire | 2 |
| Ret | 12 | (Brazil) Francisco Landi | Escuderia Bandeirantes | Maserati 4CLT/48 | 15 laps, head gasket | 7 |
| Ret | 28 | (United States) Harry Schell | Enrico Platé | Maserati 4CLT/48 | 12 laps, oil loss | 19 |
| Ret | 28 | (France) André Simon | Equipe Gordini | Simca-Gordini Type 15 | 8 laps, piston | 9 |
| Ret | 28 | (Italy) Giuseppe Farina | Alfa Corse | Alfa Romeo 159 | 8 laps, piston | 4 |
| Ret | 30 | (Switzerland) Antonio Branca | Vickomtesse de Walckiers | Maserati 4CLT/48 | 6 laps, oil pump | 16 |
| Ret | 18 | (Monaco) Louis Chiron | Ecurie Rosier | Talbot-Lago T26C | 5 laps, head gasket | 6 |
| DNS | 38 | (United Kingdom) Stirling Moss | Scuderia Ambrosiana | Ferrari 125 | crash | - |
| DNA | 22 | (Italy) Felice Bonetto | Alfa Corse | Alfa Romeo 159 | | - |

| Previous race: 1951 Pescara Grand Prix | Formula One non-championship races 1951 season | Next race: 1951 Goodwood Trophy |
| Previous race: 1950 Bari Grand Prix | Bari Grand Prix | Next race: 1952 Bari Grand Prix |
