= 1955 BRDC International Trophy =

- Non-championship race in the 1955 Formula One season
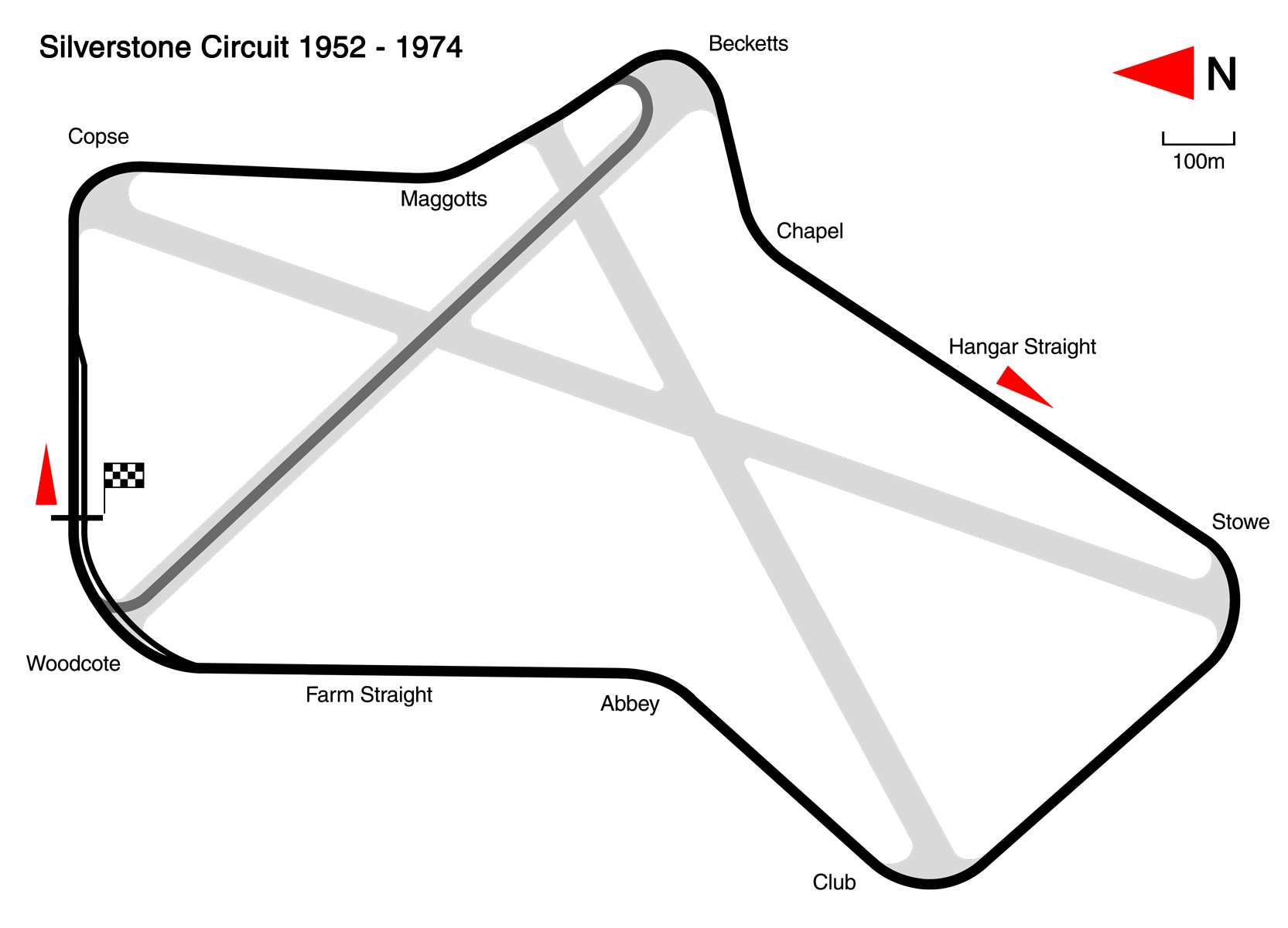

Race details
- Date: 7 May 1955
- Official name: VII BRDC International Trophy
- Location: Silverstone Circuit, Northamptonshire
- Course: Permanent racing facility
- Course length: 4.71 km (2.93 miles)
- Distance: 60 laps, 282.60 km (175.59 miles)

Pole position
Driver	Roy Salvadori	Maserati
- Time: 1:48

Fastest lap
Drivers	(United Kingdom) Roy Salvadori	Maserati
	(United Kingdom) Peter Collins	Maserati
- Time: 1:47

Podium
First	(United Kingdom) Peter Collins	Maserati
Second	(United Kingdom) Roy Salvadori	Maserati
Third	(Thailand) B. Bira	Maserati

The 7th BRDC International Trophy – formally the International Daily Express Trophy – was a motor race, run to Formula One rules, held on 7 May 1955 at Silverstone Circuit, Northamptonshire. The race was run over 60 laps, and was won by British driver Peter Collins in a Maserati 250F. Collins also shared fastest lap with Maserati driver Roy Salvadori, who was on pole position for the start of the race.

== Results ==
Pos.	No.	Driver	Entrant	Car	Time/Retired	Grid
1	3	(United Kingdom) Peter Collins	Owen Racing Organisation	Maserati 250F	1h49m50, 95.94 mph	5
2	4	(United Kingdom) Roy Salvadori	Gilby Engineering	Maserati 250F	1h50m29, +39s	1
3	8	(Thailand) B. Bira	B. Bira	Maserati 250F	59 laps	8
4	5	(France) André Simon	Ecurie Rosier	Maserati 250F	57 laps	16
5	6	(France) Louis Rosier	Ecurie Rosier	Maserati 250F	57 laps	18
6	22	(United Kingdom) John Riseley-Prichard	Equipe Endeavour	Connaught Type A-Lea Francis	55 laps	14
7	15	(Australia) Jack Brabham	Jack Brabham	Cooper T24-Alta	54 laps	19
8	21	(United Kingdom) Bill Holt	Bill Holt	Connaught Type A-Lea Francis	54 laps	17
9	20	(United Kingdom) John Coombs	John Coombs	Connaught Type A-Lea Francis	47 laps	22
10	23	(United Kingdom) Bob Gerard	Bob Gerard	Cooper T23-Bristol	47 laps	18
Ret	10	(United Kingdom) Kenneth McAlpine	Connaught Engineering	Connaught Type B-Alta	43 laps - fuel system	12
Ret	19	(United Kingdom) Don Beauman	Sir Jeremy Boles	Connaught Type A-Lea Francis	42 laps - oil pressure	7
Ret	9	(United Kingdom) Jack Fairman	Connaught Engineering	Connaught Type B-Alta	28 laps - throttle linkage	4
Ret	2	(United Kingdom) Ken Wharton	Vandervell Products	Vanwall	21 laps - accident	9
Ret	16	(United Kingdom) Paul Emery	Emeryson Cars	Emeryson Mk1-Alta	21 laps - accident/fire	21
Ret	1	(United Kingdom) Mike Hawthorn	Vandervell Products	Vanwall	16 laps - oil pipe	2
Ret	12	(France) Robert Manzon	Equipe Gordini	Gordini Type 16	16 laps - rear axle	6
Ret	18	(United Kingdom) Mike Keen	RJ Chase	Cooper T24-Alta	15 laps - mechanical	11
Ret	23	(United Kingdom) Alan Brown	R Gibson	Connaught Type A-Lea Francis	10 laps - mechanical	15
Ret	25	(United Kingdom) Reg Parnell	Scuderia Ambrosiana	Ferrari 625	10 laps - transmission	10
Ret	7	(United Kingdom) Stirling Moss	Stirling Moss Ltd.	Maserati 250F	10 laps - cylinder head	3
Ret	14	(France) Jacques Pollet	Equipe Gordini	Gordini Type 16	6 laps - transmission	20
DNS	24	(Spain) Alfonso de Portago	Alfonso de Portago	Ferrari 625	accident	
DNA	11	(United Kingdom) Leslie Marr	Connaught Engineering	Connaught Type B-Alta	car not ready	
DNA	26	(Italy) Giuseppe Farina	Scuderia Ferrari	Ferrari 625	car not ready	
DNA	27	(France) Maurice Trintignant	Scuderia Ferrari	Ferrari 625	car not ready	

Previous race: 1954 Bordeaux Grand Prix	Formula One non-championship races 1955 season	Next race: 1955 Naples Grand Prix
Previous race: 1954 BRDC International Trophy	BRDC International Trophy	Next race: 1956 BRDC International Trophy
