= 1956 BRSCC Formula 1 Race =

- Non-championship race in the 1956 Formula One season
- Brands Hatch Circuit

Race details
- Date: 14 October 1956
- Official name: I BRSCC Formula 1 Race
- Location: Brands Hatch Circuit, United Kingdom
- Course: Permanent racing facility
- Course length: 1.99 km (1.24 miles)
- Distance: 15 laps, 29.83 km (18.60 miles)

Pole position
| Driver | (United Kingdom) Stuart Lewis-Evans | Connaught |
- Time: 0:58.8

Fastest lap
| Driver | (United Kingdom) Archie Scott-Brown | Connaught |
- Time: 0:59.0

Podium
| First | (United Kingdom) Archie Scott Brown | Connaught |
| Second | (United Kingdom) Stuart Lewis-Evans | Connaught |
| Third | (United Kingdom) Roy Salvadori | Maserati |

The 1956 BRSCC Formula 1 Race was a non-championship Formula One race held on 14 October 1956 at the Brands Hatch circuit in Kent. The race was won by Archie Scott Brown, in a works Connaught-Alta. This was the first Formula 1 race to be held at Brands Hatch.

== Results ==
| Pos | No | Driver | Constructor | Car | Time/Retired | Grid |
|---|---|---|---|---|---|---|
| 1 | 2 | (United Kingdom) Archie Scott Brown | Connaught Engineering | Connaught Type B-Alta | 15m07.6, 73.78mph | 2 |
| 2 | 4 | (United Kingdom) Stuart Lewis-Evans | Connaught Engineering | Connaught Type B-Alta | +3.4s | 1 |
| 3 | 8 | (United Kingdom) Roy Salvadori | Gilby Engineering | Maserati 250F | +5.8s | 4 |
| 4 | 1 | (United Kingdom) Les Leston | Connaught Engineering | Connaught Type B-Alta | +15.6s | 3 |
| 5 | 3 | (United Kingdom) Jack Fairman | Connaught Engineering | Connaught Type B-Alta | +23.6s | 5 |
| 6 | 7 | (United Kingdom) Bruce Halford | B. Halford | Maserati 250F | +49.4s | 9 |
| 7 | 9 | (United Kingdom) Bob Gerard | F.R. Gerard | Cooper T23-Bristol | +1 lap | 8 |
| 8 | 12 | (United Kingdom) Dick Gibson | R. Gibson | Connaught Type A-Lea Francis | +1 lap | 10 |
| 9 | 10 | (United Kingdom) Bill Morice | W.F. Morice | Cooper T23-Bristol | +2 laps | 7 |
| 10 | 6 | (United Kingdom) Leslie Hunt | L.A. Hunt | Cooper T23-Aston Martin | +2 laps | 12 |
| Ret | 5 | (United Kingdom) Paul Emery | Emeryson Cars | Emeryson-Alta | 7 laps, engine | 6 |
| Ret | 11 | (United Kingdom) Alan Mann | A. Mann | HWM-Alta | 2 laps, engine | 11 |

| Previous race: 1956 Vanwall Trophy | Formula One non-championship races 1956 season | Next race: 1957 Buenos Aires Grand Prix |
| Previous race: None | BRSCC Formula 1 Race | Next race: None |
