= 1954 Lavant Cup =

- Non-championship race in the 1954 Formula One season

Race details
- Date: 19 April 1954
- Official name: VI Lavant Cup
- Location: Goodwood Circuit, West Sussex
- Course: Permanent racing facility
- Course length: 3.809 km (2.367 miles)
- Distance: 7 laps, 26.577 km (16.569 miles)

Pole position
Driver	(United Kingdom) Roy Salvadori	Maserati
- Grid positions set by ballot

Fastest lap
Drivers	(United Kingdom) Roy Salvadori	Maserati
	(United Kingdom) Reg Parnell	Ferrari
- Time: 1:36.2

Podium
First	(United Kingdom) Reg Parnell	Ferrari
Second	(United Kingdom) Roy Salvadori	Maserati
Third	(United Kingdom) Kenneth McAlpine	Connaught

The 6th Lavant Cup was a motor race, run to Formula One rules, held on 19 April 1954 at Goodwood Circuit, West Sussex. The race was run over 7 laps, and was won by British driver Reg Parnell in a Ferrari 625. Second-placed driver Roy Salvadori in a Maserati 250F shared fastest lap with Parnell. Kenneth McAlpine was third in a Connaught Type A-Lea Francis.

== Results ==
Pos.	No.	Driver	Entrant	Car	Time/Retired
1	17	(United Kingdom) Reg Parnell	Scuderia Ambrosiana	Ferrari 625	11:21.4, 88.77 mph
2	9	(United Kingdom) Roy Salvadori	Gilby Engineering	Maserati 250F	+0.6s
3	40	(United Kingdom) Kenneth McAlpine	Connaught Engineering	Connaught Type A-Lea Francis	+30.0s
4	43	(United Kingdom) Lance Macklin	HW Motors Ltd.	HWM-Alta	+40.2s
5	18	(United Kingdom) Leslie Marr	Leslie Marr	Connaught Type A-Lea Francis	+44.8s
6	21	(United Kingdom) Eric Brandon	Ecurie Richmond	Cooper T23-Bristol	+1:12.2
7	45	(United Kingdom) Tony Rolt	Connaught Engineering	Connaught Type A-Alta	6 laps, magneto
8	56	(United Kingdom) Charles Boulton	Charles Boulton	Connaught Type A-Lea Francis	+1 lap
9	14	(United Kingdom) Leslie Thorne	Ecurie Ecosse	Connaught Type A-Lea Francis	+1 lap
Ret	57	(United Kingdom) Dick Gibson	R. Gibson	Cooper T23-Bristol	4 laps
Ret	47	(United Kingdom) Alan Brown	R.J. Chase	Cooper T23-Bristol	2 laps
Ret	39	(United Kingdom) Peter Whitehead	Peter N. Whitehead	Cooper T24-Alta	1 lap, throttle linkage
Ret	21	(United Kingdom) John Webb	John H. Webb	Turner-Lea Francis	1 lap
DNA	1	(Italy) Alberto Ascari	G.A. Vandervell	Vanwall	car not ready
DNA	2	(Switzerland) Emmanuel de Graffenried	Baron de Graffenried	Maserati A6GCM	
DNA	23	(United Kingdom) Rodney Nuckey	Ecurie Richmond	Cooper T23-Bristol	
DNA	26	(United Kingdom) Jock McBain	Border Reivers	Cooper T20-Bristol	
DNA	50	(United Kingdom) Paul Emery	Emeryson Cars	Emeryson Mk1-Alta	
DNA	54	(United Kingdom) Ted Whiteaway	E.N. Whiteaway	HWM-Alta	

Previous race: 1954 Pau Grand Prix	Formula One non-championship races 1954 season	Next race: 1954 Bordeaux Grand Prix
Previous race: 1953 Lavant Cup	Lavant Cup	Next race: 1955 Lavant Cup
