= 1956 Vanwall Trophy =

- Non-championship race in the 1956 Formula One season
- Snetterton Circuit

Race details
- Date: 22 July 1956
- Official name: I Vanwall Trophy
- Location: Snetterton Circuit, United Kingdom
- Course: Permanent racing facility
- Course length: 4.35 km (2.71 miles)
- Distance: 15 laps, 65.20 km (40.65 miles)

Pole position
Driver	(United Kingdom) Roy Salvadori	Maserati

Fastest lap
Driver	(United Kingdom) Archie Scott-Brown	Connaught
- Time: 1:41.4

Podium
First	(United Kingdom) Roy Salvadori	Maserati
Second	(United Kingdom) Horace Gould	Maserati
Third	(Australia) Jack Brabham	Maserati

The 1956 Vanwall Trophy was a non-championship Formula One race held on 22 July 1956 at Snetterton Circuit, Norfolk. The race was won by Roy Salvadori, in a privately entered Maserati 250F.

== Results ==
Pos	No	Driver	Constructor	Car	Time/Retired	Grid
1	10	(United Kingdom) Roy Salvadori	Gilby Engineering	Maserati 250F	26m24.8, 92.34mph	1
2	21	(United Kingdom) Horace Gould	Gould's Garage (Bristol)	Maserati 250F	27m32.2, +1m7.4	3
3	37	(Australia) Jack Brabham	J.A. Brabham	Maserati 250F	+1 lap	4
4	22	(United Kingdom) Bill Morice	W.F. Morice	Cooper T20-Aston Martin	+4 laps	5
5	23	(United Kingdom) Leslie Hunt	L.A. Hunt	Cooper T23-Bristol	+1 lap	6
Ret	36	(United Kingdom) Archie Scott-Brown	Connaught Engineering	Connaught Type B-Alta	6 laps, oil pipe	2
DNA		(United Kingdom) Paul Emery	Emeryson Cars	Emeryson-Alta	engine not repaired	-
DNA		(United Kingdom) Tommy Atkins	C.T. Atkins	Connaught Type A-Lea Francis		-
DNA		(United Kingdom) Dick Gibson	R. Gibson	Connaught Type A-Lea Francis		-
DNA		(United Kingdom) Bruce Halford	B. Halford	Maserati 250F	engine not repaired	-
DNA		(United Kingdom) Alastair Birrell	A.W. Birrell	Cooper T20-Bristol		-
DNA		(United Kingdom) Bob Gerard	F.R. Gerard	Cooper T23-Bristol	car not ready	-

Previous race: 1956 Aintree 100	Formula One non-championship races 1956 season	Next race: 1956 Caen Grand Prix
Previous race: None	Vanwall Trophy	Next race: None
