= Roberto Mieres =

Argentine racing driver (1924–2012)

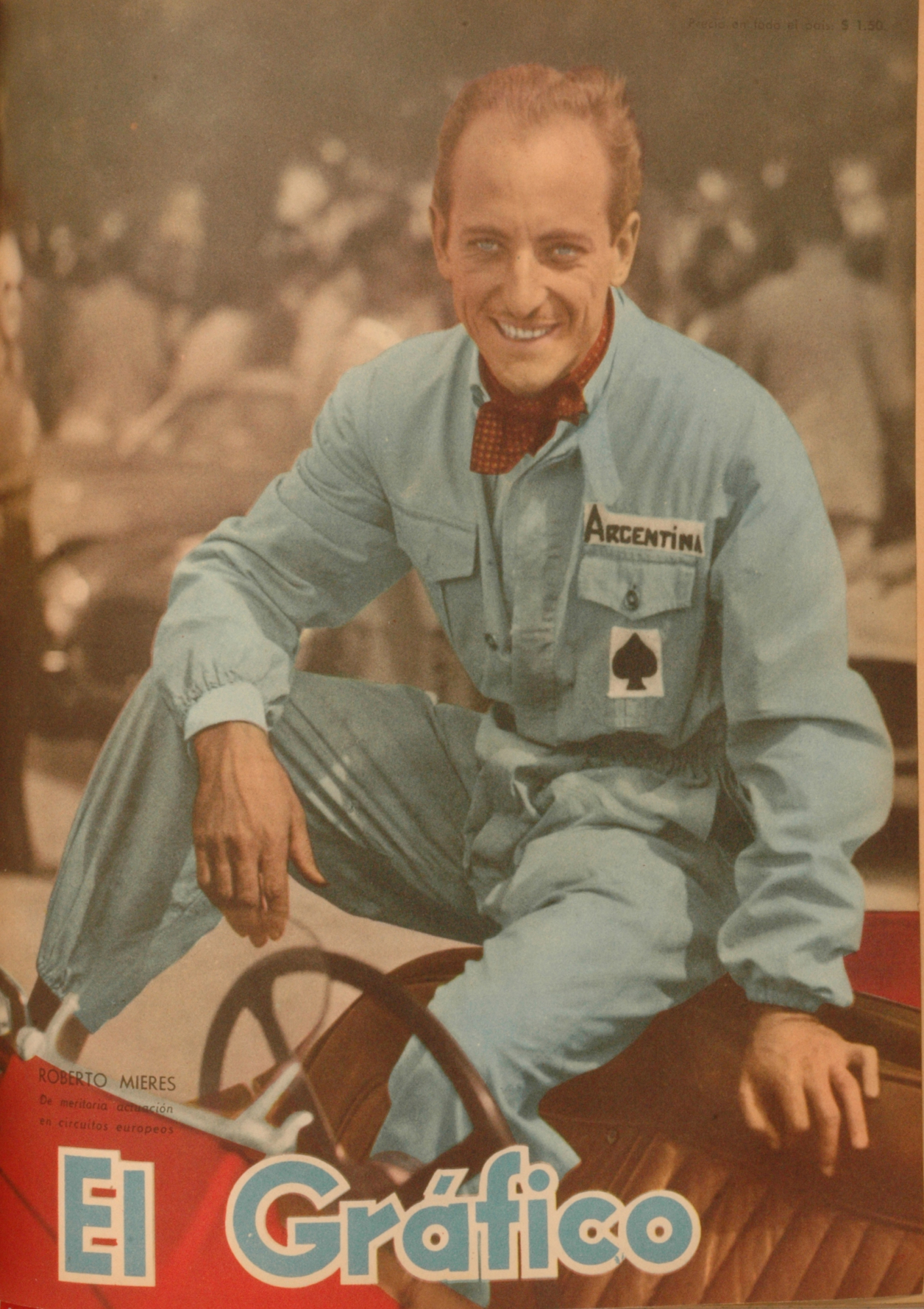
- Mieres in 1953
- Born: Roberto Casimiro Mieres Dasso; 3 December 1924; Mar del Plata, Argentina
- Died: 26 January 2012 (aged 87); Punta del Este, Uruguay

Formula One World Championship career
- Nationality: (Argentina) Argentine
- Active years: 1953–1955
- Team(s): Gordini, Maserati
- Entries: 17
- Championships: 0
- Wins: 0
- Podiums: 0
- Career points: 13
- Pole positions: 0
- Fastest laps: 1
- First entry: 1953 Dutch Grand Prix
- Last entry: 1955 Italian Grand Prix

Roberto Casimiro Mieres Dasso (3 December 1924 – 26 January 2012) was a racing driver from Mar del Plata, Argentina. He participated in 17 Formula One World Championship Grands Prix, debuting on 7 June 1953. He scored a total of 13 championship points.

== Formula One and sports car racer ==
Mieres competed in a number of different sports, including rowing, sailing, rugby, and tennis. He first took up motorsport in Argentina with an MG, which he later replaced with a Mercedes-Benz SSK and then a Bugatti formerly driven by Achille Varzi, using the latter to win the Argentine sports car championship. As a reward, he was invited to join his compatriots Juan Manuel Fangio and José Froilán González on a trip to Europe, during which he finished fourth in the 1950 Circuit des Nations in Geneva driving a Maserati 4CLT/48 Formula Two car. After returning to Argentina, he was recruited by the Gordini team to replace the injured Jean Behra, allowing him to make his début in the World Championship at the 1953 Dutch Grand Prix. He also competed in the French and Italian Grands Prix, taking a best finish of sixth at Monza.

Mieres scored his best result of 1953, however, in the non-championship Grand Prix de l'Albigeois held in Albi, France, finishing in fourth place. He also finished third in a sports car handicap race at Caen in July 1953, which was won by Jean Chancel. In January 1954, Mieres came in second at the Buenos Aires Grand Prix. Maurice Trintignant was victorious after Mike Hawthorn skidded close to the finish. The tail of Mieres' Maserati caught fire during the 1954 Belgian Grand Prix at Spa Francorchamps. After belatedly realising this, he slammed on the brakes and jumped to safety. Mieres then finished fifth in a Maserati at the 1954 British Grand Prix at Silverstone. In the 1957 City of Buenos Aires sports car race, Mieres drove a 3.5 litre Jaguar to a fourth-place finish. His driving partner was Ninian Sanderson of Scotland. Mieres later teamed with Anton Van Dorey for a win in the 1959 USAC Road Racing Championship Daytona 1,000 km, the predecessor to the modern Rolex 24 at Daytona.

It is likely that an oil slick dropped by Mieres' Porsche caused a tragic accident at the 1958 Cuban Grand Prix, in which at least four people were killed and fifty more injured. Ferrari driver Armando Garcia Cifuentes skidded on a large oil slick which had been deposited on the track and crashed into a grandstand; one lap earlier, Mieres had pitted to replenish oil he had lost with a broken oil line.

== Retirement ==
After his racing career wound down in the late 1950s, Mieres returned to his other interest of sailing, and represented Argentina in the 1960 Summer Olympics in Rome. He competed against fellow former racing driver, Prince Bira in the Star class, finishing 17th and beating his old rival in the process. Only five others have competed in both the Formula One World Championships and the Olympics. He died at the age of 87 in Uruguay.

== Complete Formula One World Championship results ==
(key) (results in italics indicate fastest lap)

Year	Entrant	Chassis	Engine	1	2	3	4	5	6	7	8	9	WDC	Points
1953	Équipe Gordini	Gordini Type 16	Gordini Straight-6	ARG	500	NED; Ret	BEL	FRA; Ret	GBR	GER	SUI	ITA; 6	NC	0
1954	Roberto Mieres	Maserati A6GCM	Maserati Straight-6	ARG; Ret	500	BEL; Ret	FRA; Ret	GBR; 6					11th	6
1954	Roberto Mieres	Maserati 250F	Maserati Straight-6						GER; Ret				11th	6
1954	Officine Alfieri Maserati	Maserati 250F	Maserati Straight-6							SUI; 4	ITA; Ret	ESP; 4	11th	6
1955	Officine Alfieri Maserati	Maserati 250F	Maserati Straight-6	ARG; 5	MON; Ret	500	BEL; 5 *	NED; 4	GBR; Ret	ITA; 7			8th	7

* Indicates shared drive with Jean Behra.
