= Jacques Pollet =

French racing driver (1922–1997)

- Born: 2 July 1922; Roubaix, France
- Died: 16 August 1997 (aged 75); Paris, France

Formula One World Championship career
- Nationality: (France) French
- Active years: 1954–1955
- Team: Gordini
- Entries: 5
- Championships: 0
- Wins: 0
- Podiums: 0
- Career points: 0
- Pole positions: 0
- Fastest laps: 0
- First entry: 1954 French Grand Prix
- Last entry: 1955 Italian Grand Prix

Jacques Pollet (2 July 1922 – 16 August 1997) was a racing driver from France. He participated in 5 Formula One World Championship Grands Prix, debuting on 4 July 1954. He scored no championship points.

== Complete Formula One World Championship results ==
(key)

Year	Entrant	Chassis	Engine	1	2	3	4	5	6	7	8	9	WDC	Points
1954	Equipe Gordini	Gordini Type 16	Gordini Straight-6	ARG	500	BEL	FRA; Ret	GBR	GER	SUI	ITA	ESP; Ret	NC	0
1955	Equipe Gordini	Gordini Type 16	Gordini Straight-6	ARG	MON; 7	500	BEL	NED; 10	GBR	ITA; Ret			NC	0
