= British Racing Motors V16 =

BRM P15 V-16

Overview
- Manufacturer: (United Kingdom) British Racing Motors
- Production: 1947–1955

Layout
- Configuration: 135° V16
- Displacement: 1,487.76 cc (91 cu in)
- Cylinder bore: 1.95 in (49.53 mm)
- Piston stroke: 1.90 in (48.26 mm)
- Valvetrain: 32-valve, DOHC, two valves per cylinder

Combustion
- Supercharger: Two-stage centrifugal
- Fuel system: Carburettor
- Oil system: Dry sump

Output
- Power output: 400–600 hp (298–447 kW)

Dimensions
- Dry weight: approx. 200–230 kg (441–507 lb)

The British Racing Motors V16 is a supercharged 1.5-litre (90.8 cu. in.) V-16 cylinder racing engine built by British Racing Motors (BRM) for competing in Formula One motor racing in the immediate aftermath of World War II. Designed in 1947 and raced until 1954–55, it produced 600 bhp (450 kW) at 12,000 rpm, although test figures from Rolls-Royce suggested that the engine would be able to be run at up to 14,000rpm.

The very complex engine was exceptionally powerful for the time, but it initially proved a disappointment, possessing poor reliability so that cars either did not start or failed to finish races. In the 1952 Formula One season, after BRM withdrew their V16 engined cars before a race in Turin while attempting to enlist Juan Manuel Fangio, leaving only Ferrari as the main contestants with no effective competition, the racing organisers abandoned the Formula One series and ran the remaining year's races as Formula Two.

== Development ==
The engine was designed by a team consisting of Peter Berthon, Harry Mundy, Eric Richter, and Frank May. It was conceived as basically two 750cc V8 engines back-to-back with cam drives and gears in the centre of the engine. Components were manufactured by various British companies, including English Steel – the crankshaft, Standard Motors – machining of the main engine components, sump, etc., and David Brown – the gears. Eventually there were around 350 companies that provided support to the project, including Rolls-Royce, which designed, manufactured and tested the two-stage centrifugal supercharger. The firm also developed the flame traps for the inlet manifold, used to prevent the highly compressed fuel/air mixture from exploding in a backfire. The traps were a first on a car engine, reflecting the supercharger's extremely limited use in automobiles, but had become a necessity on high-powered piston aero engines such as the Merlin and Griffon. Twin-pot carburettors were designed for the engine by SU.

=== BRM Type 15 ===
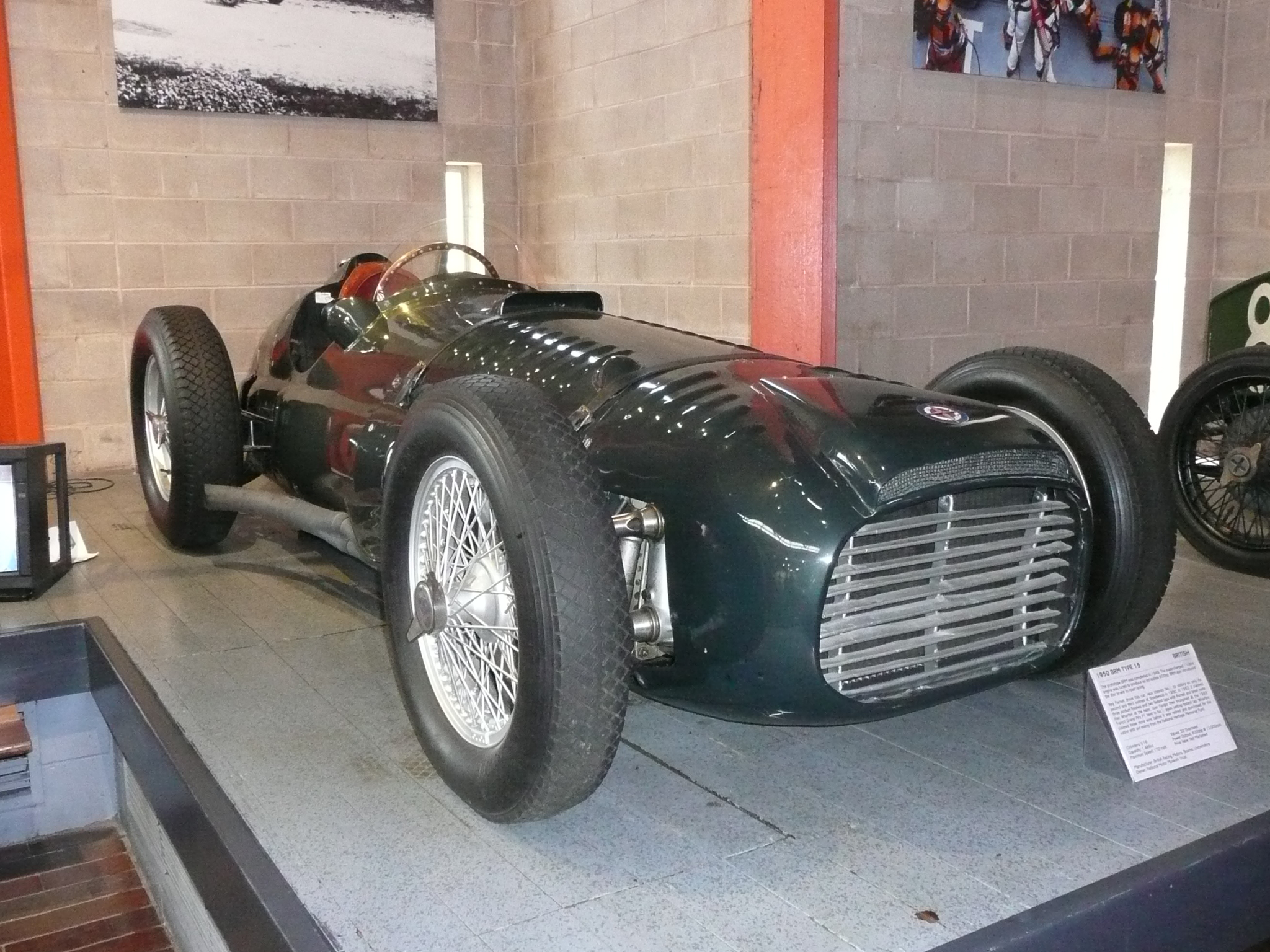
The BRM Type 15 shown with the later enlarged radiator opening and louvred ventilated bonnet

The chassis of the BRM Type 15 car designed for the engine was made by Rubery Owen. The gearbox was designed by Mundy based on the one from the German pre-war 1939 1.5 litre V8 Mercedes-Benz W165 car: part of BRM's ethos was to exploit German technology that had so recently been used against Britain during World War II. Cameron Earl had visited Germany to retrieve any relevant documents. Rear suspension of the new BRM was also derived from Mercedes-Benz, and trailing arm front suspension from Auto Union. Girling provided special three-leading-shoe drum brakes for the car and the springing and shock absorbers were Lockheed air-struts incorporating silicon oil/air pocket adjustable springing/damping on all four wheels. The body panels and styling of the car were designed by Walter Belgrove of Standard Motors. Design of the car and all engineering drawings had been completed by the Spring of 1947.

In many cases parts were produced in the form of donations to the BRM team by the respective companies, which had the advantage of reducing BRM's spending. However, many parts were produced only when suppliers had spare capacity and so were delayed, and because the parts were donated BRM were unable to expedite delivery. Because of this, the engine itself was late. Some completed components did not arrive at BRM for assembly until May 1949, reducing time available for testing before the start of the first season's racing.

The completed car was first run on the aerodrome at RAF Folkingham in December 1949, driven by Raymond Mays, who was suffering from a high fever at the time. The use of Folkingham was the British Government's sole contribution to the project.

== Races ==
It had been intended to début the car at the 1950 Formula One Grand Prix race at Silverstone on 13 May, the first race of the new Formula One World Championship, but problems with the engine, such as cylinders cracking, buckling of connecting rods, and piston failures, led to the postponement of the race début. BRM instead had to settle for displaying the car at Silverstone after the BRM mechanics had worked all the previous night to get the car ready. Mays drove the car for several laps. The demonstration was witnessed by Princess Elizabeth, later Elizabeth II, and her husband, Prince Philip, Duke of Edinburgh.

The car was first entered in a race at the August 1950 Daily Express non-Championship race at Silverstone. The one car that the team had been able to prepare was flown from Folkingham into Silverstone on the morning of the race. It had missed the practice sessions but, after three proving laps driven by Frenchman Raymond Sommer, was allowed to start from the back of the grid. When the flag dropped at the start of the race, the BRM, carrying the racing number 8, merely lurched forward and then stopped, engine screaming, with Sommer unable to get any drive. The car was pushed over to the side of the track and withdrawn. One or both inboard universal joints had failed. This was perceived as a particularly unfortunate event for the car and British Racing Motors as the Daily Express newspaper had produced a glossy brochure about the new car, and the failure of the BRM at the race is considered to have somewhat coloured people's perception of the car ever since.

The next outing was a short sprint event at Goodwood in September of that year. Reg Parnell won two races, including the Goodwood Trophy, despite being unable to use all the car's power due to the poor weather and wet circuit. After the fiasco of Silverstone, the two wins demonstrated that the car could actually go and had tremendous speed and acceleration. Parnell said in a news interview after the races; "All we need now is a little longer time to develop it and then we hope to show the Continent what we really can do". In subsequent races Peter Walker drove a second car, and in July 1951 BRM was able to enter two cars for the 1951 British Grand Prix. During the race the two drivers suffered from extreme heat in the cockpit because the exhaust pipes were routed inside the bodywork. This problem had not been so troublesome in earlier, shorter, races. During one of two pit stops, Parnell and Walker had to wrap burn dressings around their legs to provide insulation from the heat, together with limiting the revs to 10,500rpm to reduce the cockpit temperature to a tolerable level. Despite this, and starting from the back of the field, Parnell finished 5th, with Walker 7th.

Later the team went to Monza, intending to run two cars in the 1951 Italian Grand Prix to be driven by Parnell and Walker, after prospective driver Ken Richardson was vetoed by the RAC. However gearbox trouble in one car led to Berthon, anticipating a similar problem in the other, withdrawing both cars. Disappointed, Mays' team returned home, but one car was able to remain at Monza for further testing due to the generosity of the track's owners, who allowed the team to run the car on the circuit and use the circuit's facilities at no charge. The car was the first Grand Prix car to use disc brakes: Girling created a set of special brakes for the car which were tested in late 1951 while still at Monza.

In 1952 Stirling Moss came to BRM to work on testing the car, with the possibility of racing it. He drove one of two BRMs in the 1952 Ulster Trophy but had problems with his car during the start. Both cars failed to finish and the race was won by Piero Taruffi driving a Ferrari. Later in 1952, BRM entered three cars in a race at Goodwood; the cars finished first, second and third.

In the same year Alfa Romeo, one of the leading players in the sport, stated that they might not participate in further Grands Prix, leaving only two major teams, Ferrari and a temporarily uncompetitive Maserati. The race organisers of Formula One wondered who could take Alfa Romeo's place.

Ferrari had built new cars for the 1952 season and BRM was then asked if it would be entering cars. BRM replied by preparing two cars for an April race at Valentino Park, Turin, one drum-braked car, and the other disc-braked, with Moss as one driver, and with Mays all the while attempting to enlist Fangio, who had until recently been driving for Alfa Romeo, as the other. This Mays succeeded in doing, but this meant missing the Turin race. Fangio came to Folkingham to test the car. At this point the BRM V16 was developing around 400–450 hp. As soon as he got in the car, Fangio seemed to take to the vehicle, driving the car with his usual élan. It was stated that all the drivers who had driven the car prior to Fangio had been in awe of it.

Meanwhile, at the missed Turin race, Ferraris had finished in the first six places, prompting the race organisers to abandon BRM as their hope of providing any real competition for Ferrari in Formula One, and instead run the remaining season's races as Formula Two events. Thus, by not competing in the Turin race, BRM contributed to the downfall of the Formula for which the car had been built.

In the middle of 1952 the cars were substantially rebuilt, including better cooling – most notably a greatly enlarged radiator aperture in the nose, better ventilation, and repositioning of the exhaust pipe stubs. The car had been deliberately designed with a low seating position, but Fangio, asked what changes he would like on the car, replied that amongst other things he would like a little higher seat, as he liked to see where he was going. The car was modified to Fangio's request and he drove the car intermittently throughout 1953. He later said that it was the most formidable car he ever drove during his career. At this stage the engines were developing more than 500 hp, touching 600 hp, albeit with a very peaky power curve. This power curve had been forecast by Rolls-Royce who had recommended that inter-stage throttling of the supercharger be incorporated to provide a curve more suited to road use. Berthon considered the addition an unnecessary complication, and this, and the alternative variable-angle stators at the supercharger's inlet - both used initially on the two-stroke Crecy - which had been developed and tested by Rolls-Royce for the engine, were not proceeded with.

After a particularly trying time with reliability problems during a 1952 race at Ulster, Fangio was asked if he would ever drive the BRM again. He replied; "I will. I consider it to be, basically, the best Formula One car ever made. All it needs is improvement in certain details. No car has ever given me such a thrill to drive, or a greater sense of absolute mastery. I will stand by it". Unfortunately for both Fangio and BRM, the following day, tired after an overnight drive from Folkingham across Europe to Monza for a race, he crashed while driving for Maserati, breaking his neck, and retired from racing to recover until early 1953.

After Fangio's accident at Monza, Mays, looking around for a replacement driver, auditioned Mike Hawthorn, who drove the car at Folkingham but later complained: "It was no use – every time I came to a corner and went below the 8,000rpm mark, the power went right off. Then, suddenly, as you reached the 8,000 mark the full power would come in and you had a job to hold the car straight. At 8,000rpm it really did motor, but the steering was nothing to write home about". Hawthorn went on to drive a Ferrari for Tony Vandervell instead. In the meantime, the car was raced by José Froilán González and Ken Wharton, who was one of BRM's own test drivers.

At around this time the trust that managed BRM decided that they had gone as far as they could with the car and decided to put the assets up for sale. The best offer came from the Rubery Owen Group and Alfred Owen, who, despite the trying times with the car, had remained loyal to the project. In this period the team missed an opportunity to move the entire effort to the Midlands where, due to the prevalence of British motor companies, the team would have benefited from greater and more convenient technical and engineering support. Instead the team remained at The Maltings at Bourne.

Also in 1953, the BRM had a moment of glory at Albi. Three cars were entered in a sprint race specifically for Formula One cars. Driven by a now-recovered Fangio, González and Wharton, their main competitor was a works' Ferrari driven by Alberto Ascari. Fangio went on to win a heat race in spectacular fashion, although Wharton had a bad crash and did not finish. In addition, the BRMs had also suffered from tyre problems. Ascari later commented that with all the noise produced by the BRMs he had been almost unable to hear anything else while driving. This race is regarded as showing what Formula One could have been like had it been continued into 1953. During the race Fangio's car's V16 ran at a claimed 72 psi boost (4.9 ata) and 585 bhp (436 kW) at 11,800 rpm, the car reaching 186 mph (300 km/h).

At around this time Tony Rudd, who had by then joined BRM after his previous period of secondment from Rolls-Royce, suggested that they build a lightweight, short-wheelbase, version of the car for this sort of race, and this subsequently became the Mark II or Type 30. Two were built; the first used components from the wreck of Wharton's car damaged at Albi. Rudd was thinking of chasing the Class F Record with the car, and asked his former employers what they thought the engine was capable of if tuned for all-out speed for only a few miles. Rudd stated that Rolls-Royce replied; "They said it would pull 800hp with all the goodies and 1,000hp with a sprint fuel". However, the attempt on the record was never made.

Amongst the other drivers, the Type 15 Mark II/Type 30 was also driven by Ron Flockhart. The cars were raced in 1954 and 1955 while BRM worked on a car for the new Formula One specification of 2.5 litres un-supercharged. By this time the V16-powered cars were running quite reliably, but the demise of the Formula around which they had been based prevented the Mark II cars from making a greater impact.

The cars last raced around the end of 1955. One of the later drivers was Peter Collins, who, Owen thought, was the only driver other than Fangio who showed the BRM Type 15/Type 30 to its best advantage.

The potential of the engine was illustrated in 1968 when Graham Hill drove the car in a demonstration in South Africa, the car being fitted with the original, larger, Rolls-Royce supercharger inlet. Hill revved the engine to 13,000rpm, at which point Rudd thought the engine would have been producing around 780 bhp.

Fangio's opinion on the BRM Type 15/Type 30 was; "It was the most fantastic car I ever drove – an incredible challenge in every way."

== Results ==
The engine was powerful and the car was fast. Reliability, at least early on, was not adequate: the engine suffered from water leaks into the cylinders, due to the use of a separate head/block assembly. (Most previous supercharged car engines used a combined unit). The V16 head-block union was unable to survive the high pressures involved, leading to warping and lifting of the head.

- Number of Grands Prix 4
- Number of starts 2
- Number of finishes 2
- Number of finishes in points 1

After the fiasco of the Ulster Trophy in June 1952, where both BRM V16-powered Type 15's failed to finish, Stirling Moss wrote to Raymond Mays telling him that he did not want to drive the car in the state that it was in, given its lack of reliability.

== Conclusion ==
Although reliability was a problem during the car's brief Formula One career, the car and engine went on to become quite reliable after the initial problems had been worked out. Unfortunately this did not occur until after the Formula the car had been designed for had been abandoned. The cars themselves contributed to the changing of the Formula due to Mays' withdrawal of the cars at Turin in 1952. By the time the reliability problems had been solved the car had nowhere to race in the Formula it was intended for.

A total of four Type 15s were produced, one of which was written off by a collision during the Glover Trophy and salvaged for spares, while another car that crashed at Albi was used as the basis for one of the two P30s produced. One Type 15 is on display at the National Motor Museum in Beaulieu, the other is on display as part of the Donington Grand Prix Exhibition in its original light green paint scheme alongside a P30 and a cutaway V16 engine. The fourth surviving car, another P30, is in the ownership of Bernie Ecclestone, having previously been owned by Pink Floyd drummer Nick Mason. The cars can sometimes be seen in action at the various historic racing events such as the Goodwood Festival of Speed and Goodwood Revival.

== Technical data ==
- Designer: Peter Berthon
- Cylinders: V16
- RPM: 12,000
- Displacement 1487.76 cc (90.8 cu in)
- Power 550 bhp (410.1 kW)
- Dry sump 50 to 70 lbf/in^{2}
- 135 degree V16 alloy cylinder block and crankcase. Cast iron wet liners.
- Bore 1.95 in (49.53 mm)
- Stroke 1.90 in (48.26 mm)
- Fuel system Rolls-Royce two-stage centrifugal supercharger with two 3 in (76 mm). SU carburettors. 82.6 psi (5.7 bar) maximum boost.
- Fuel Petrol/alcohol fuel
- Ignition Lucas coil, later four Lucas magnetos. One spark plug per cylinder
- Valve gear 2 valves per cylinder @ 80 degrees with twin overhead camshafts per cylinder bank, via gear train from the centre of the crankshaft. Hairpin valve springs.
- Inlet valves 1.25 in (32 mm)
- Exhaust valves 1.09 in (28 mm)
- Crankshaft Counterbalanced two piece with 8 plain bearings & 2 main roller bearings. (Later 10 plain bearings.)

== Power ==
In Raymond Mays' book, he claimed the following power curve with the 4.0:1 supercharger (5.7 ata):

- 100 bhp (75 kW) at 5,000 rpm
- 175 bhp (130 kW) at 6,000 rpm
- 250 bhp (190 kW) at 7,000 rpm
- 335 bhp (250 kW) at 8,000 rpm
- 412 bhp (307 kW) at 9,000 rpm
- 525 bhp (391 kW) at 10,000 rpm
- 585 bhp (436 kW) at 11,000 rpm
- 600 bhp (450 kW) at 12,000 rpm

He also stated that at Albi 1953, Fangio's V16 had 72 psi boost (4.9 ata) and 585 bhp (436 kW) @ 11,800 rpm, and he reached over 190 mph (306 km/h).

Tony Rudd's book showed a power curve peaking at 612 bhp (456 kW).
