= Museo Juan Manuel Fangio =

Motor racing car museum in Balcarce, Buenos Aires, Argentina

Coordinates: 37°50′53″S 58°15′18″W

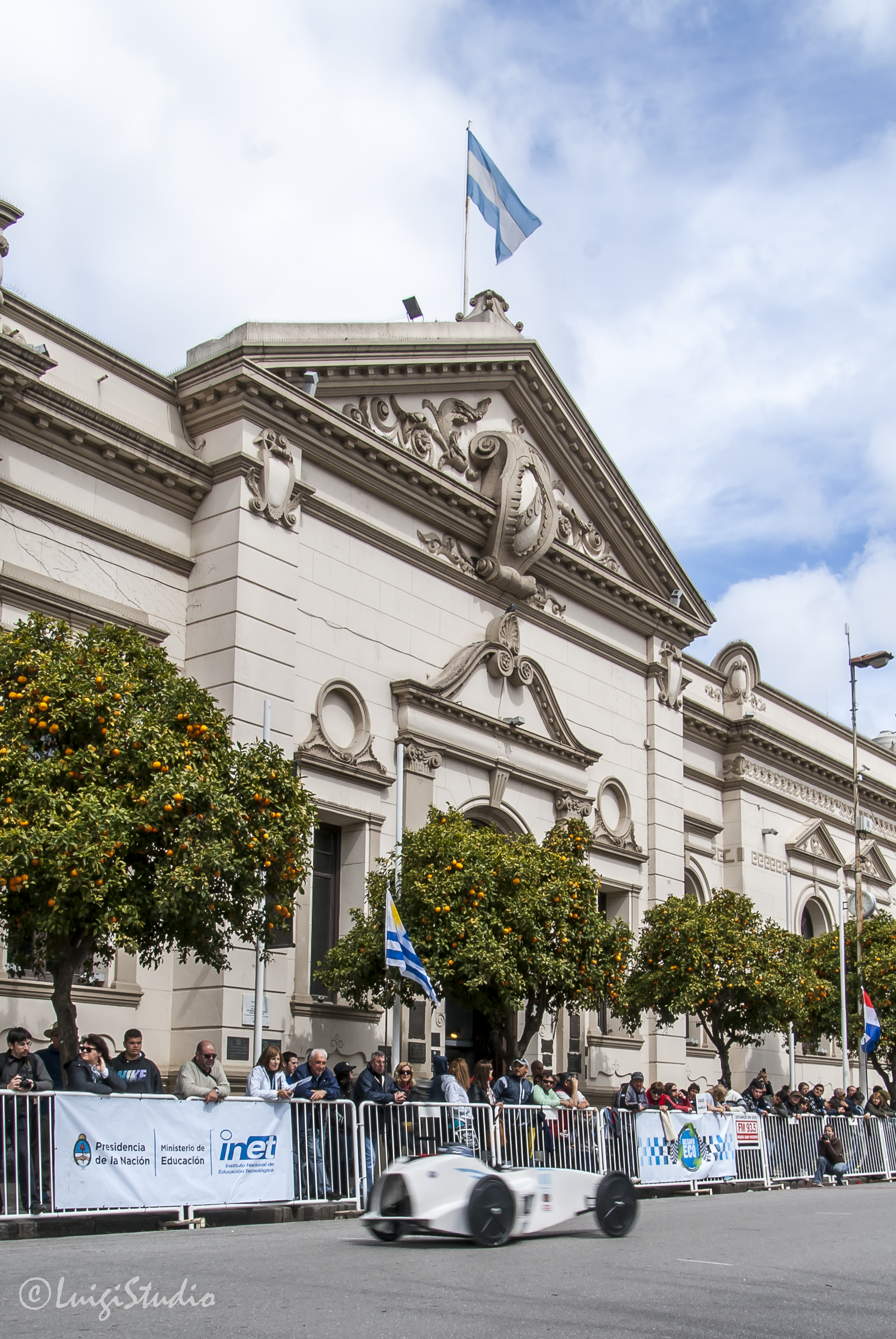
Museo Juan Manuel Fangio in Balcarce.

The Museo Juan Manuel Fangio (Juan Manuel Fangio Museum), is a museum of motor racing cars, dedicated to Formula One driver Juan Manuel Fangio and located in Balcarce, Buenos Aires Province, Argentina.

== The museum ==
The museum opened in 1986, in the presence of five-time Formula One champion Juan Manuel Fangio. Located just a few blocks from where Fangio was born, the museum houses a collection of cars, trophies, photographs and other memorabilia. The museum occupies a total surface of 4,600 square metres (50,000 sq ft) and is divided into six levels. The car collection has over 50 cars.

== Notable racing cars in the collection ==
- McLaren Honda MP4/3B
- Brabham BT 36
- Toyota Eagle MK II
- Renault RE 30B
- McLaren MP4/10
- Sauber Mercedes-Benz C9
- Penske PC-23 Mercedes-Benz
- Alfa Romeo 308
- Mercedes-Benz W196
- Maserati 250F
- Lancia-Ferrari D50
- Simca Gordini T15
- Simca-Gordini T15S Compresseur
- Arrows A21
- Maserati 300S
- Lola T96/20
- Baufer-Ford belonging to Dante Emiliozzi and his brother.

== Other notable cars ==
- Mercedes-Benz C111
- Mercedes-Benz 300SL
- Mercedes-Benz 300 Coupe

== Notable visitors ==
- (Argentina) Juan Manuel Fangio
- (Argentina) José Froilán González
- (Argentina) Carlos Reutemann
- (United Kingdom) Stirling Moss
- (United Kingdom) Jackie Stewart
- (Switzerland) Clay Regazzoni
- (Italy) Luigi Villoresi
- (United States) Phil Hill
- (United States) Carroll Shelby
