= Juan Manuel Fangio =

Argentine racing driver (1911–1995)

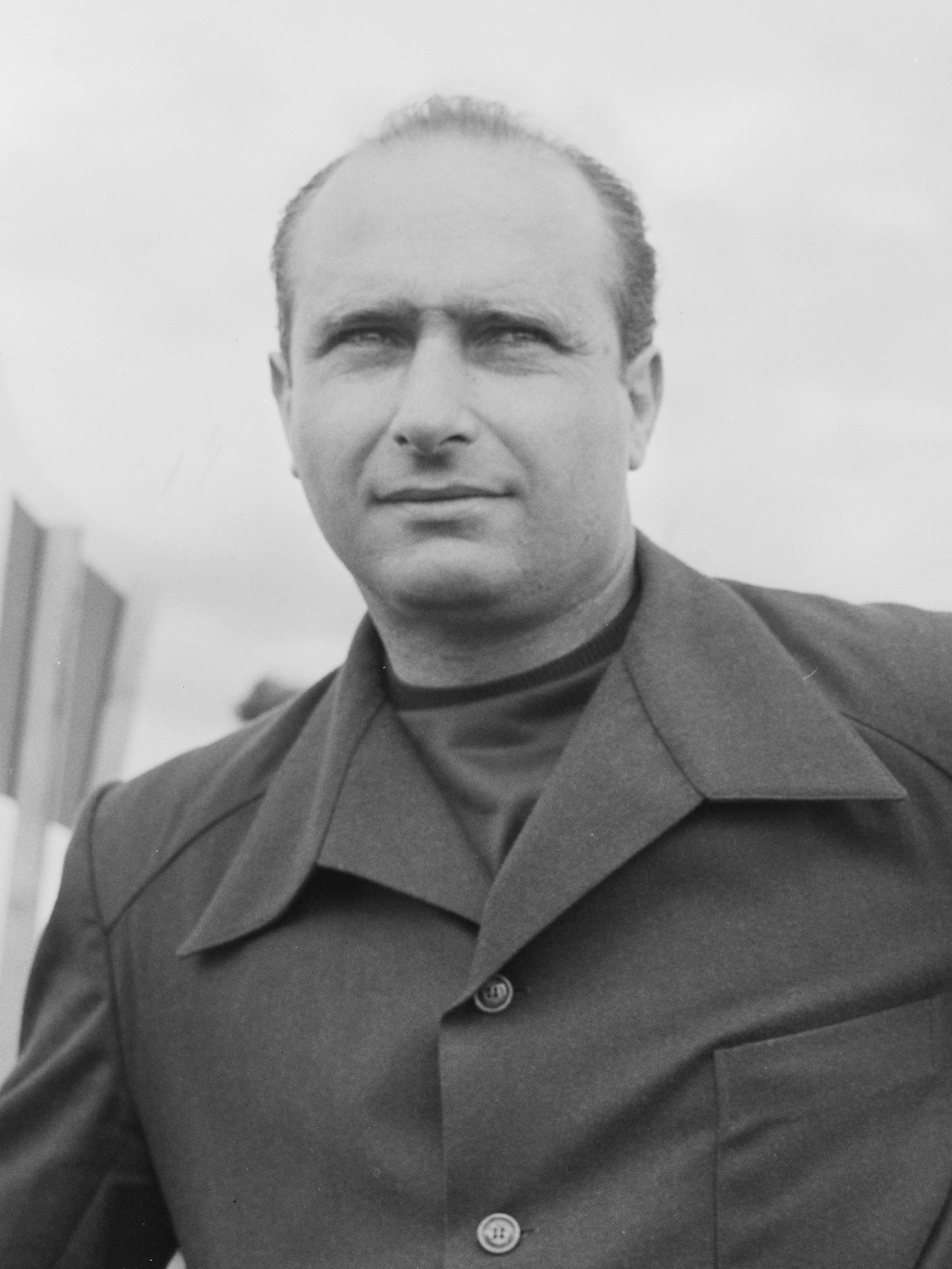
- Fangio in 1955
- Born: 24 June 1911; Balcarce, Buenos Aires, Argentina
- Died: 17 July 1995 (aged 84); Buenos Aires, Argentina
- Children: 3
- Relatives: Juan Manuel Fangio II (nephew)

Formula One World Championship career
- Nationality: (Argentina) Argentine
- Active years: 1950–1951, 1953–1958
- Team(s): Alfa Romeo, Maserati, Mercedes, Ferrari
- Entries: 52 (51 starts)
- Championships: 5 (1951, 1954, 1955, 1956, 1957)
- Wins: 24
- Podiums: 35
- Career points: 245 (277 9/14) (Note: Up until 1990, not all points scored by a driver contributed to their final World Championship tally (see list of points scoring systems for more information). Numbers without parentheses are Championship points; numbers in parentheses are total points scored.)
- Pole positions: 29
- Fastest laps: 23
- First entry: 1950 British Grand Prix
- First win: 1950 Monaco Grand Prix
- Last win: 1957 German Grand Prix
- Last entry: 1958 French Grand Prix

Juan Manuel Fangio (Spanish: [ˈxwan maˈnwel ˈfaŋxjo], Italian: [ˈfandʒo]; 24 June 1911 – 17 July 1995) was an Argentine racing driver, who competed in Formula One from 1950 to 1958. Nicknamed "el Chueco" and "el Maestro", (Note: In Spanish, el Chueco means "the Bow-Legged One" or "the bandy-legged one", and el Maestro means "the Master".) Fangio won five Formula One World Drivers' Championship titles and—at the time of his retirement—held the record for most wins (24), pole positions (29), fastest laps (23), and podium finishes (35), among others.

From childhood, Fangio abandoned his studies to pursue auto mechanics. In 1938, he debuted in the newly-formed Argentine stock car racing series Turismo Carretera, competing in a Ford V8. In 1940, he competed with Chevrolet, winning the Grand Prix International Championship and devoted his time to the Turismo Carretera becoming its champion, a title he successfully defended a year later. Fangio then competed in Europe between 1947 and 1949, where he achieved further success.

One of the most successful drivers in Formula One history, Fangio made his debut in the inaugural Formula One season in 1950 to dominate the first decade of the championship. He went on to win the World Drivers' Championship five times—a record that stood for 46 years—and became the only driver in F1 history to win titles with four different teams: Alfa Romeo (1951), Maserati (1954 and 1957), Mercedes-Benz (1954 and 1955), and Ferrari (1956). (Note: Fangio competed in the 1954 Argentine and Belgian Grands Prix with Maserati, then completed the 1954 Formula One season with Mercedes as soon as the W196 was ready, making him also the only driver in F1 history to win a championship driving for more than one team in the same season.) He holds the highest winning percentage in Formula One at 46.15%, winning 24 of 52 Formula One races he entered. Additionally, Fangio also holds the record for the highest pole percentage at 55.77%, achieving 29 pole positions from 52 entries. Fangio is the only Argentine driver to have won either the World Drivers' Championship or the Argentine Grand Prix.

Among his greatest F1 wins is the 1955 Argentine Grand Prix, contested in very hot weather for three hours. While the few other finishing cars were driven by two or three younger drivers who took turns, the 44 year old drove the whole race on his own, and set fastest lap doing so. His last GP win was for Maserati at the 1957 German Grand Prix where he faced better Ferrari cars, and opted to make a pit stop for fuel and tyres. After this stop was delayed by mistakes, and his lead was lost, he patiently drove with new tyres and half full tank, then went all-out and caught up to the leaders by taking unprecedented risks and beating the lap record several times.

Fangio also competed in endurance sports car racing, winning the 1953 Carrera Panamericana and the 12 Hours of Sebring in 1956 with Ferrari and in 1957 with Maserati. He finished second in the 1955 Targa Florio, and twice in the Mille Miglia.

After retirement, Fangio presided as the honorary president of Mercedes-Benz Argentina from 1987, a year after the inauguration of his museum, until his death in 1995. In 2011, on the centenary of his birth, Fangio was remembered around the world and various activities were held in his honor.

== Early life ==
Fangio's grandfather, Giuseppe Fangio, emigrated to Buenos Aires from Italy in 1887. Giuseppe was able to buy his own farm near Balcarce, a small town near Mar del Plata in southern Buenos Aires Province, Argentina, within three years by making charcoal from tree branches. Giuseppe brought his family, with his 7-year son Loreto, later the racing driver's father, to Argentina from the small central Italian town of Castiglione Messer Marino in the Chieti province of the Abruzzo region. His mother, Herminia Déramo, was from Tornareccio, slightly to the north. Fangio's parents married on 24 October 1903 and lived on farms, where Herminia was a housekeeper and Loreto worked in the building trade, becoming an apprentice stonemason.

Fangio was born in Balcarce on 24 June 1911, San Juan's Day, at 12:10 am. His birth certificate was mistakenly dated 23 June in the Register of Balcarce. He was the fourth of six children. In his childhood he became known as El Chueco, the bandy-legged one, for his skill in bending his left leg around the ball to shoot on goal in football games.

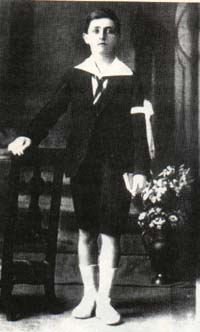
Fangio as a child when he took his Roman Catholic First Communion, c. 1920

Fangio started his education at School No. 4 of Balcarce, before transferring to School No. 1 and 18 Uriburu Av. When Fangio was 13, he dropped out of school and worked in Miguel Angel Casas auto mechanics' workshop as an assistant mechanic. When he was 16, he started riding as a mechanic for his employer's customers. He developed pneumonia that almost proved fatal, after a football game where hard running had caused a sharp pain in his chest. He was bed-ridden for two months, cared for by his mother.

After recovering, Fangio served compulsory military service at the age of 21. In 1932 he was enlisted at the Campo de Mayo cadet school near Buenos Aires. His driving skills caught the attention of his commanding officer, who appointed Fangio as his official driver. Fangio was discharged before his 22nd birthday, after taking his final physical examination. He returned to Balcarce where he aimed to further his football career. Along with his friend José Duffard he received offers to play at a club based in Mar del Plata. Their teammates at Balcarce suggested the two work on Fangio's hobby of building his own car, and his parents gave him space to do so in a rudimentary shed at the family home.

== Early racing career ==
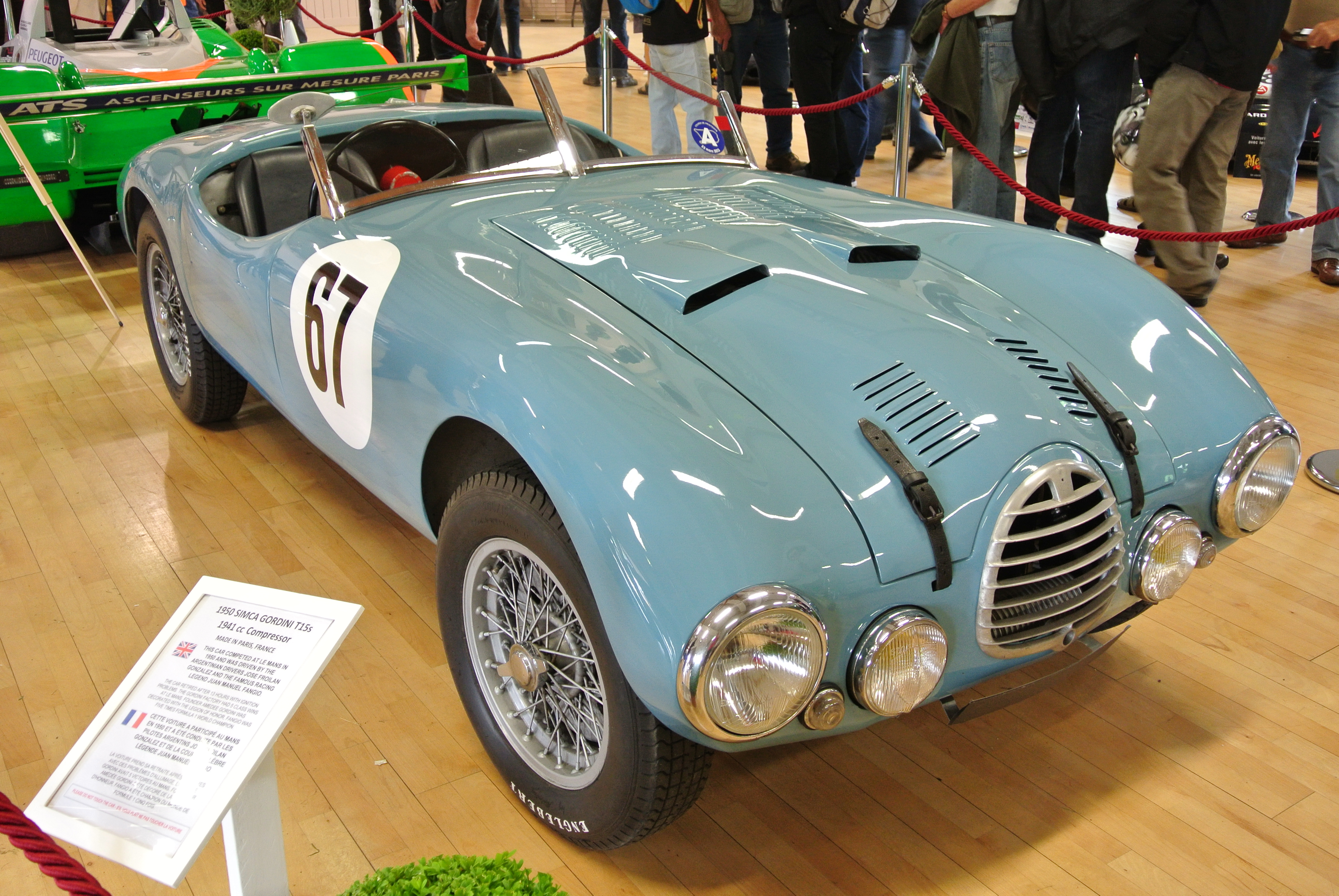
1950 Simca Gordini T15s, as raced, and retired, at the 1950 24 Hours of Le Mans by José Froilán González and Juan Manuel Fangio

After finishing his military service, Fangio opened his own garage and raced in local events. He began his racing career in Argentina in 1936, driving a 1929 Ford Model A that he had rebuilt. In the Tourismo Carretera category, Fangio participated in his first race between 18 and 30 October 1938 as the co-driver of Luis Finocchietti. Despite not winning the Argentine Road Grand Prix, Fangio drove most of the way and finished fifth. In November of that year, he entered the "400 km of Tres Arroyos", but it was suspended due to a fatal accident.

During his time racing in Argentina, Fangio drove Chevrolet cars and was Argentine National Champion in 1940 and 1941. One particular race, the 1940 Gran Premio del Norte, was almost 10,000 km (6,250 mi) long, one that Fangio described as a "terrible ordeal". This rally-style race started in Buenos Aires on 27 September, and ran up through the Andes and Bolivia to Lima, Peru, and then back to Buenos Aires, taking 15 days, ending on 12 October with stages held each day. This gruelling race was held in the most difficult and varied conditions imaginable—drivers had to traverse through hot and dry deserts, insect-ridden jungles with crushing humidity, freezing cold and sometimes snowy mountain passes with 1,000 feet (300 m) cliff drops at extremely high altitude, sometimes in total darkness, and cold, highly elevated deserts such as the Atacama- all on a mixture of dirt and paved roads- none of which were closed off to the public. Early in the race Fangio hit a large rock and damaged the car's driveshaft, which was replaced in the next town. Later on at an overnight stop in Bolivia one of the townspeople crashed into Fangio's car and bent an axle—he and his co-driver spent all night fixing it. Following this repair the fan blade got loose and punctured the radiator, which meant another repair before it was later replaced. They drove 150 miles (240 km) through scorching desert with no water, and during a night stint one of the headlights fell off and they had to be secured with his co-driver's necktie. The weather in the Andes mountains and the Atacama was so cold that Fangio drove with his co-driver's arms around him for hours. These mountainous routes in Bolivia and Peru sometimes involved going up to altitudes of 14,000 feet (4,300 m) above sea level—a 40 percent reduction of air thickness, making breathing incredibly difficult and the engine being severely down on power. When Fangio finally got out of the mountains and back to Buenos Aires, after traversing all these external challenges, he had won the race, which was his first big victory.

In 1941, Fangio beat Oscar Gálvez in the Grand Prix Getúlio Vargas in Brazil, which was a six-day, 3,731-kilometre (2,318 mi) public road race starting from and ending at Rio de Janeiro, going through various cities and towns all over Brazil such as São Paulo and Belo Horizonte. For the second time, Fangio was crowned champion of Argentine TC. In 1942, he took tenth place in the South Grand Prix. In April he won the race "Mar y Sierras", and then had to suspend activity due to World War II. In 1946, Fangio returned to racing with two races in Morón and Tandil driving a Ford T. In February 1947, Fangio competed at National Mechanics (MN) at the Retiro circuit, and on 1 March, he started the race for Rosario City Award. Subsequently, Fangio triumphed in the Double Back Window Race.

In March 1948, Fangio participated in the Grand Prix of Rosario in a French Simca-Gordini at the 2.82 km Parque Independencia circuit in Argentina’s third largest city. He was up against Europe’s top Grand Prix drivers of the time, including Jean-Pierre Wimille, perhaps the best Grand Prix driver of the 1940s. He was also racing top Italian stars Nino Farina and Luigi Villoresi, and pre-WWII legend Achille Varzi. In this 50 lap race, Fangio and Wimille, also driving a Simca-Gordini battled throughout the race, and Fangio in his older Type 11 passed Wimille, who was driving a newer Type 15 for the lead. But Wimille eventually passed Fangio and took back the lead, and Fangio had to retire due to a broken suspension. Wimille won, but Fangio’s performance had left a big impression.

In October 1948, Fangio however suffered a personal tragedy in another gruelling race, this time 1948 South American Grand Prix, another point-to-point race from Buenos Aires to Caracas, Venezuela—a 20-day event covering a distance of 9,580 kilometres (5,950 mi) through Argentina, Bolivia, Peru, Ecuador, Colombia and finally Venezuela. Fangio, with his co-driver Daniel Urrutia battled hard with brothers Juan and Oscar Galvez, and Domingo Marimon throughout- Fangio was pushing hard to make up lost time he incurred in Argentina. On the 10th day, on the Lima to Tumbes stage in northern Peru, on coastal roads along the Pacific Ocean, Fangio was driving at night in thick fog generated from the ocean in near-pitch black darkness when he approached a left-hand bend at 140 kilometres per hour (87 mph) near the village of Huanchaco, not far from the city of Trujillo. With his car's lights not helping him in the thick fog, he approached the bend too fast, lost control of the car and tumbled down an embankment, and Urrutia was thrown out of the car through the front windscreen. Oscar Galvez stopped to help Fangio, who had neck injuries, then soon found the badly injured Urrutia. Another competitor, Luciano Marcilla, stopped and took Fangio and Urrutia to the hospital in the town of Chocope 50 km (31 mi) away. Fangio survived but 35-year-old Urrutia did not, suffering multiple fatal cervical and basal skull fractures. Domingo Marimon won the race, but the race was a disaster and was marred by the deaths of three spectators and three drivers (including Urrutia). Fangio believed he would never race again and entered a depressed state after the death of his friend, but he recovered, and his successes in Argentina caught the attention of the Argentine Automobile Club and the Juan Peron-led Argentine government, so they bought a Maserati and sent him to Europe in December 1948 to continue his career.

== Formula One and sports car racing ==
=== Overview ===
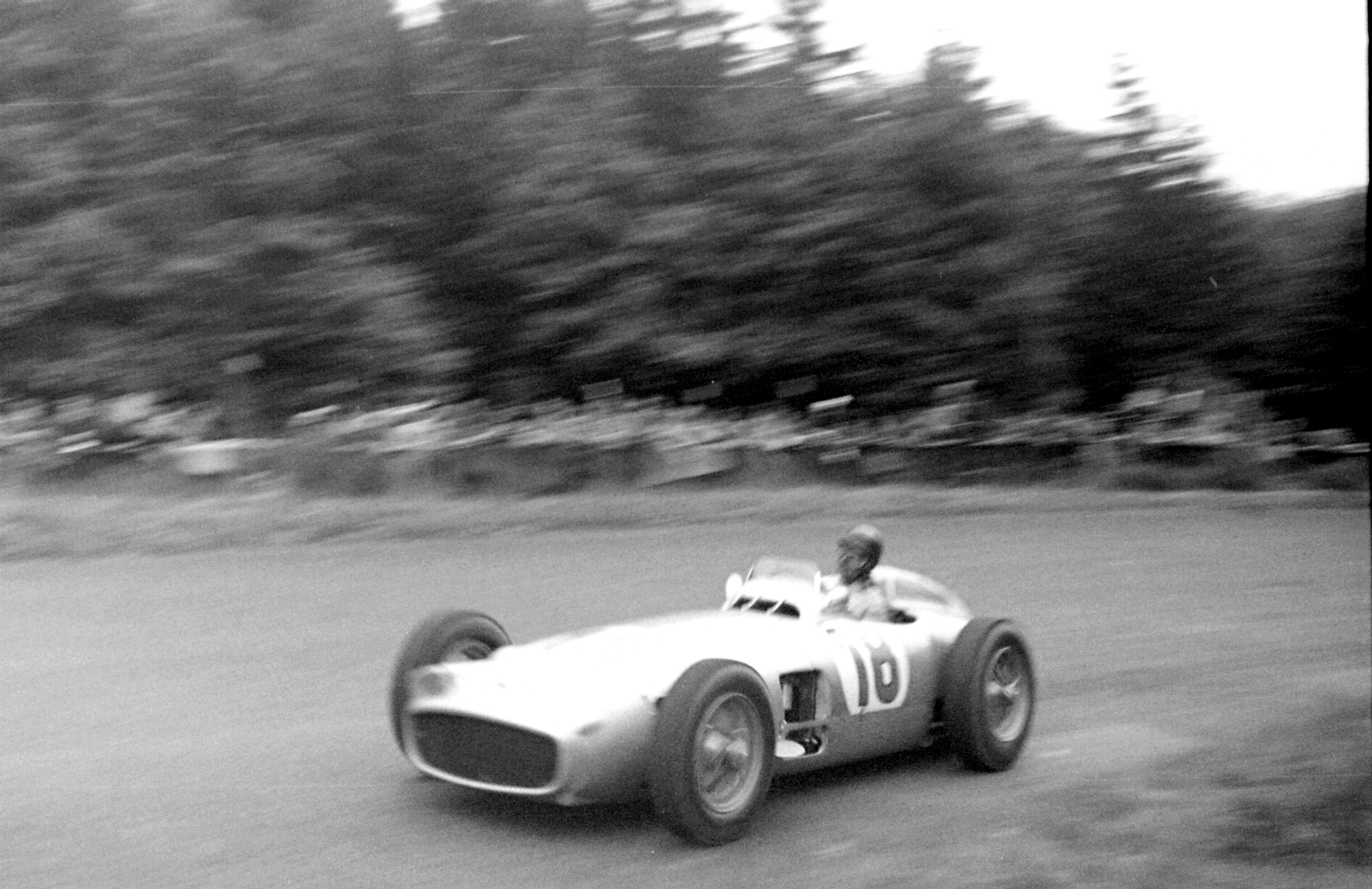
Fangio at the 1954 German Grand Prix at the Nürburgring

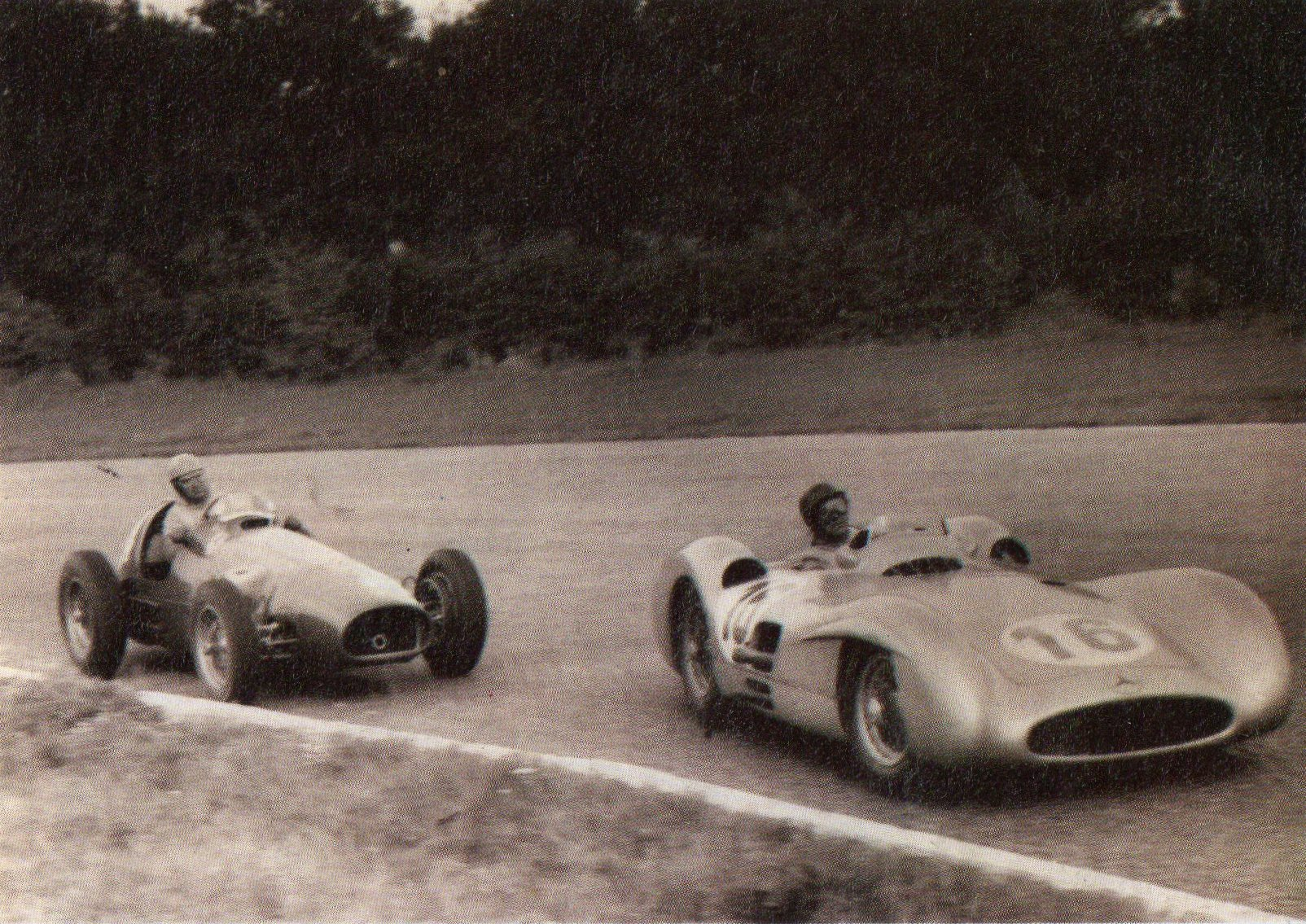
Fangio being chased by Alberto Ascari during the 1954 Italian Grand Prix

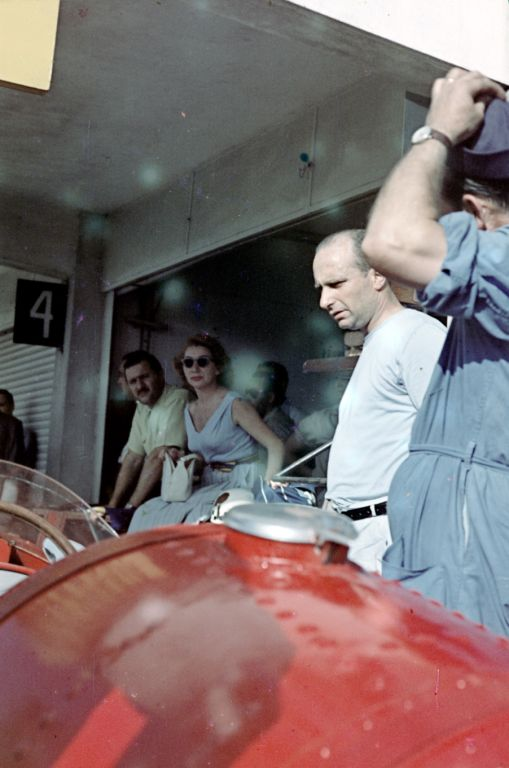
Fangio at the 1957 Argentine Grand Prix in Buenos Aires

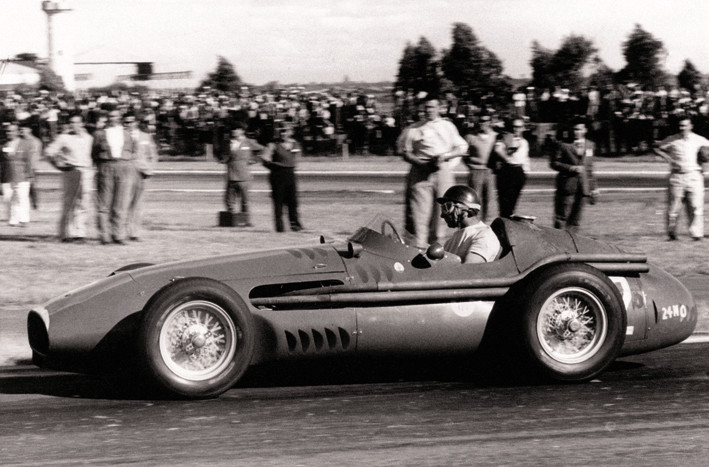
Fangio driving a Maserati 250F

Fangio was the oldest driver in many of his Formula One races, having started his Grand Prix career in his late 30s. During his career, drivers raced with almost no protective equipment on circuits with no safety features. Formula One cars in the 1950s were for the time not only fast, but very physically and mentally demanding to drive; races were much longer than today and demanded incredible stamina. Tyres were very narrow and cross-ply, and far less forgiving; treads often stripped in a race, and spark plugs fouled. The drivers wore goggles with cloth helmets up to 1952, where from that year on helmets were made mandatory, so they wore pie-shaped crash hats made of paper-mache. The cars had no seatbelts, no roll-over protection, no bodywork to contain the driver (up until 1954) and the front-engined layout of these cars meant that the heated air from the engine and the gearbox would often blast the bodies of the drivers for the hours of the race, with the driveshaft spinning between their legs, and there were, of course, no electronic aids or computer intervention. At the end of a GP, drivers often suffered blistered hands caused by heavy steering and gear changing, and their faces were sometimes covered in soot from the inboard brakes. Despite Fangio's short career, he was one of the top GP drivers in history, rivalling Tazio Nuvolari.

Fangio had no compunction about leaving a team, even after a successful year or even during a season, if he thought he would have a better chance with a better car. As was then common, several of his race results were shared with teammates after he took over their car during races when his own had technical problems. His main rivals included Alberto Ascari and Stirling Moss, and on occasion Giuseppe “Nino” Farina and Mike Hawthorn (Farina particularly in the early part of Fangio’s career). Throughout his career, Fangio was backed by funding from the Argentine government of Juan Perón.

=== World championship successes ===
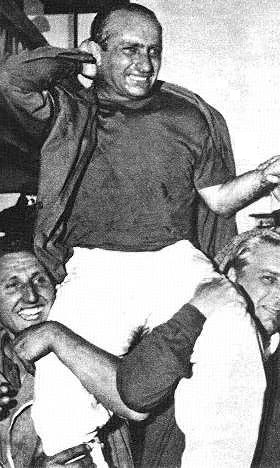
Fangio after winning the 1957 German Grand Prix at the Nürburgring

Fangio's first Grand Prix race was the 1948 French Grand Prix at Reims, where he started his Simca Gordini from 11th on the grid but retired. Fangio briefly returned to South America to compete in the aforementioned Buenos Aires to Caracas race, he then returned to Europe the following year, and raced in Sanremo; having upgraded to a Maserati 4CLT/48 sponsored by the Automobile Club of Argentina he dominated the event, winning both heats to take the aggregate win by almost a minute over Prince Bira. Fangio entered a further six Grand Prix races in 1949, winning four of them against top-level opposition.

==== Alfa Romeo and Monza accident ====
For the first World Championship of Drivers in 1950, Fangio was taken on by the Alfa Romeo team alongside Farina and Luigi Fagioli. With competitive racing cars following the Second World War still in short supply, the pre-war Alfettas proved dominant. Fangio won each of the three races he finished at Monaco, Spa and Reims-Gueux but Farina's three wins at races Fangio retired from and a fourth-place allowed Farina to take the title, even though Fangio was quicker than Farina, who was able to take advantage of Fangio's mechanical woes. Fangio's most notable victory that year was at Monaco, where he dodged a multi-car pile-up and easily won the race. In 1950s non-championship races Fangio took a further four wins at San Remo, Pau and the fearsome Coppa Acerbo at the 16-mile Pescara public road circuit, and two seconds from eight starts. At Pescara in 1950, going down a long straight called the Flying Kilometer, he was clocked doing 194 mph (310 km/h) in his Alfa. He also won a handful of races in South America for the Argentine Automobile Club driving a Maserati 4CLT and a Ferrari 166 during the European off-season.

Fangio won three more championship races for Alfa in 1951 in the Swiss, French and Spanish Grands Prix, and with the new 4.5-litre Ferraris taking points off his teammates Farina and various others, Fangio took the title at the final race in Spain, finishing six points ahead of Ascari at the Pedralbes street circuit. Fangio also finished second at the British Grand Prix at Silverstone after his horrendously fuel-inefficient Alfa had to make two lengthy pit stops to refill the car. He then finished second at the German Grand Prix at the Nürburgring after he lost first and second gear during an intense battle with Alberto Ascari.

With the 1952 World Championship being run to Formula Two specifications, Alfa Romeo did not have a car for the new formula and were unable to use their supercharged Alfettas, so they withdrew. As a result, the defending champion found himself without a car for the first race of the championship and remained absent from F1 until June, when he drove the British BRM V16 in non-championship F1 races at the public road circuits at Albi in France and Dundrod in Northern Ireland. Fangio had agreed to drive for Maserati in a non-championship race at Monza the day after the Dundrod race, but having missed a connecting flight he decided to drive through the night on pre-motorway mountain roads through the Alps from Lyon, arriving half an hour before the start. Arriving at Monza at 2 p.m., he was badly fatigued and with the race starting at 2:30 p.m., Fangio started the race from the back of the grid but lost control on the second lap, crashed into a grass bank, and was thrown out of the car as it flipped end over end, smashing through trees. He was taken to a hospital in Milan with multiple injuries, the most serious being a broken neck, and spent the rest of 1952 recovering in Argentina. Nino Farina, who had won the race, visited Fangio in hospital and gifted him with the winner's laurel wreath.

==== Maserati and sports car racing successes ====
Having returned to Europe and back to full racing fitness in 1953, Fangio rejoined Maserati for the championship season, and against the dominant Ferraris led by Ascari he took a lucky win at Monza. Fangio's car had a bad vibration all throughout practice, and he offered the Maserati mechanics 10% of his winnings if they fixed the vibration; they did, and Fangio qualified second, and won the race, setting fastest lap and beating Nino Farina by just 1.4 seconds. Along with that win, Fangio secured three second-places to finish second in the Championship, and also came third first time out in the Targa Florio. He also competed and won one of two heats in the Albi Grand Prix, again with BRM and driving the fearsome and powerful Type 15, a car with a 600 hp supercharged V16 that was difficult to drive.

Fangio also competed in one of the most dangerous and prestigious races in Europe: the Mille Miglia, a 1,000 miles (1,600 km) race on open public roads covering nearly all of northern Italy driving an Alfa Romeo 6C 3000 CM entered by the factory. The Mille Miglia and also another championship race in 1953, the Carrera Panamericana in Mexico were much like the races he competed in South America in the 1940s (except all the roads used in Italy and Mexico were paved). At the Mille Miglia, the Alfa team was expected to win, and after Farina, Karl Kling and Consalvo Sanesi all crashed, Fangio was leading when he reached Rome, pushing very hard from when he started in Brescia. Fangio then suffered left front steering arm failure near Bologna and only had consistent steering on the right front; this allowed Mille Miglia expert Giannino Marzotto to catch and beat Fangio by 12 minutes, even though the Argentine driver drove hard to keep up with Marzotto. He ended 1953 by winning the dauntingly dangerous and difficult 2,000 mi (3,200 km) Carrera Panamericana in Mexico driving a Lancia D24; Fangio was able to win this 5-day open public road rally that started at the Guatemala-Mexico border and ended at the Mexico-United States border in Ciudad Juarez, setting a new race time completion record of 18.5 hours (despite Fangio not winning a single stage), some 9 hours faster than the winner of the first event in 1950. The race was marred by multiple spectator fatalities, and the death of 50-year-old Felice Bonetto, like Fangio driving a works Lancia, on the third day of the competition in the town of Silao.

==== Mercedes-Benz ====
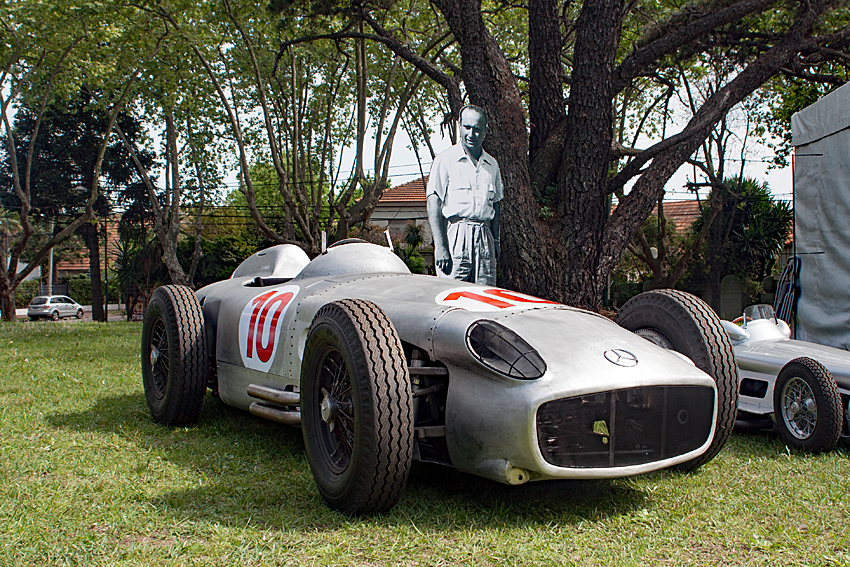
Mercedes W196 F1 car in Buenos Aires

In 1954, Fangio raced for Maserati until Mercedes-Benz entered competition in mid-season. He won his home Grand Prix in Buenos Aires and at Spa with the iconic 250F. Mercedes-Benz's first race was the French Grand Prix at the fast, straight dominated Reims public road circuit, and he won the race with the streamlined, closed-wheel W196 Monoposto- a car that although difficult to drive was ahead of its time. Fangio spent the race battling with teammate Karl Kling down Reims's long straights. Fangio failed to win at Silverstone, with the closed-wheel car designed for straight-line speed struggling at the high speed corner-dominated circuit. Fangio got the more nimble open-wheeled W196 for the Nürburgring, and won the race, as he did at Bremgarten and then at Monza, the latter with the streamlined car. Monza was a particularly brutal race in that Alberto Ascari had turned up with the new Lancia, and young British up-and-comer Stirling Moss in a private Maserati was also competitive during the race. Ascari and Moss both passed Fangio and raced each other hard until Ascari dropped out with engine problems. Moss's engine blew up near the end of the race and Fangio took victory. Winning eight out of twelve races (six out of eight in the championship) and winning his second championship in that year, he continued to race with Mercedes—driving a further developed W196 with improved performance in 1955 in a team that included Moss.

For 1955, Fangio subjected himself to a training programme which was strenuous in an effort to keep up his fitness levels high which was comparable to his younger rivals. He won a particularly brutal race at the Gran Premio de la República Argentina. This race was run in Buenos Aires during a gruelling 40 °C (104 °F) heat wave, and with track temperature of over 57 °C (135 °F) few drivers other than Fangio were able to complete the race. The W196's chassis had heated up and Fangio's right leg rubbed against the chassis structure, but even after receiving severe burns he kept going; it took him three months to recover from his injuries. 1955 also saw Fangio attempt the Mille Miglia again, this time without a navigator, driving a Mercedes-Benz 300 SLR. After leaving at 6:58 a.m., the car's advanced engine began developing problems when he got to Pescara. The Mercedes mechanics apparently found nothing, and sent him off. Fangio was losing time to Moss and Hans Herrmann, and when he got to Rome the engine was still not running smoothly. Again Fangio was sent away by the mechanics. And when he got to Florence, a few loud bangs were heard, so the mechanics raised the bonnet and they found that one of the fuel injection pipes had broken, so Fangio's 300 SLR was running on seven cylinders instead of eight; this could not be repaired and Fangio drove back to Brescia with a misfiring engine, finishing in 2nd behind Moss. Fangio later surmised that Mercedes felt he could not win the race without a navigator so they did not put as much effort behind preparing his car as they did with the car of Moss, who had a navigator. At the end of the second successful season (which was overshadowed by the 1955 Le Mans disaster in which 83 spectators were killed, an accident which happened right in front of and nearly killed him) Mercedes withdrew from racing and after four attempts, Fangio never raced at Le Mans again. A number of races were cancelled after this race except for Britain and Italy (which both already had circuits with new and updated safety facilities), which he finished in second in the former and won the latter, allowing him to win his third world championship. Mercedes's last race was the Targa Florio sportscar race, which Mercedes needed to win in order to beat Ferrari and Jaguar to the title; the German firm had skipped the first two races in Buenos Aires and Sebring, Florida. Fangio, driving with Kling finished second to Moss and Peter Collins, allowing Mercedes to win the title by two points over Ferrari.

==== Last years with Ferrari and Maserati ====
In 1956, Fangio moved to Ferrari to win his fourth title. Neither Enzo Ferrari nor the Ferrari team manager Eraldo Sculati had a warm relationship with Fangio, despite their shared success with the very difficult-to-drive Ferrari-developed Lancia car. Fangio started the year strongly by winning the gruelling 12-hour sportscar race at Sebring in America with Ferrari, driving with Eugenio Castellotti. But during the Grand Prix season, Fangio took over his teammate's cars after he suffered mechanical problems in three races, the Argentine, Monaco and Italian Grands Prix. In each case the points were shared between the two drivers. After the Monaco Grand Prix, where Fangio struggled with the ill-handling Lancia-Ferrari he asked Ferrari if he could have one mechanic exclusively for his car, as Ferrari did not have his mechanics assigned to any of the cars, as Mercedes had. Ferrari granted Fangio's request, and the performance of Fangio's car improved substantially. In addition to winning in Argentina, Fangio won the British and German Grands Prix at Silverstone and the Nürburgring. At the season-ending Italian Grand Prix, Fangio's Ferrari teammate Peter Collins, who was in a position to win the World Championship with just 15 laps to go, handed over his car to Fangio. They shared the six points won for second place, giving Fangio the World title.

"I have never driven that quickly before in my life and I don't think I will ever be able to do it again."

— Fangio after the 1957 German Grand Prix

In 1957, Fangio returned to Maserati, who were still using the same iconic 250F which Fangio had driven at the start of 1954. Fangio started the season with a hat-trick of wins in Argentina, Monaco and France, before retiring with engine problems in Britain. He also won the Sebring sportscar race in driving a Maserati 450S with Jean Behra for the second year running. But at the Grand Prix after Britain, the German Grand Prix at the Nürburgring circuit, Fangio needed to extend his lead by six points to claim the title with two races to spare. From pole position, Fangio dropped to third behind the Ferraris of Mike Hawthorn and Collins but managed to get past both by the end of the third lap. Fangio had started with half-full tanks since he expected that he would need new tyres halfway through the race. In the event, Fangio pitted on lap 13 with a 30-second lead, but a disastrous stop left him back in third place and 50 seconds behind Collins and Hawthorn. Fangio came into his own, setting one fastest lap after another, culminating in a record-breaking time on lap 20 a full eleven seconds faster than the best the Ferraris could do. On the penultimate lap, Fangio got back past both Collins and Hawthorn, and held on to take the win by just over three seconds. With Musso finishing in fourth place, Fangio claimed his fifth title. This performance is often regarded as one of the greatest drives in Formula One history, and it was also Fangio's final victory in the sport. Fangio's record of five championships remained unbroken until 2003, when Michael Schumacher won his sixth championship.

After his series of consecutive championships, Fangio retired in 1958, following the French Grand Prix. Such was the respect for Fangio that during that final race, race leader Hawthorn, who had lapped Fangio, braked as he was about to cross the line so that Fangio could complete the 50-lap distance in his final race; he crossed the line over two minutes down on Hawthorn. Getting out of the Maserati after the race, he said to his mechanic simply, "It is finished." He was famous for winning races at what he described as the slowest possible speed, in order to conserve the car to the finish. Cars in the 1940s and 1950s were unpredictable in their reliability, with almost any component susceptible to breaking. He won 24 World Championship Grands Prix, 22 outright and two shared with other drivers, from 52 entries – a winning percentage of 46.15%, the highest in the sport's history (Alberto Ascari, who has the second-highest, holds a winning percentage of 40.63%). Both drivers were already experienced Grand Prix drivers before the world championship started.

== Kidnapping ==
President Fulgencio Batista of Cuba established the non-Formula One Cuban Grand Prix in Havana in 1957. Fangio won the 1957 event, and had set fastest times during practice for the 1958 race. On 23 February 1958, two gunmen of Fidel Castro's 26th of July Movement entered the Hotel Lincoln in Havana and kidnapped Fangio. Batista ordered the race to continue as usual while police hunted down the kidnappers. They set up roadblocks at intersections, and guards were assigned to private and commercial airports and to all competing drivers.

Fangio was taken to three separate houses. His captors allowed him to listen to the race via radio, bringing a television for him to witness reports of a disastrous crash after the race concluded. In the third house, Fangio was allowed his own bedroom but became convinced that a guard was standing outside the bedroom door at all hours. The captors talked about their revolutionary programme, which Fangio had not wished to speak about, as he did not have an interest in politics. He later said: "Well, this is one more adventure. If what the rebels did was in a good cause, then I, as an Argentine, accept it." He was released after 29 hours, after being "treated very well".

The captors' motives were to force the cancellation of the race in an attempt to embarrass the Batista regime. When Fangio was handed over to the Argentine embassy soon after the race, many Cubans became convinced that Batista was losing his grip on power because he failed to track the captors down. The Cuban Revolution took over the government in January 1959, and the 1959 Cuban Grand Prix was cancelled. The Fangio kidnapping was dramatized in a 1999 Argentine film directed by Alberto Lecchi, Operación Fangio.

== Later life and death ==
=== Post-retirement activities ===
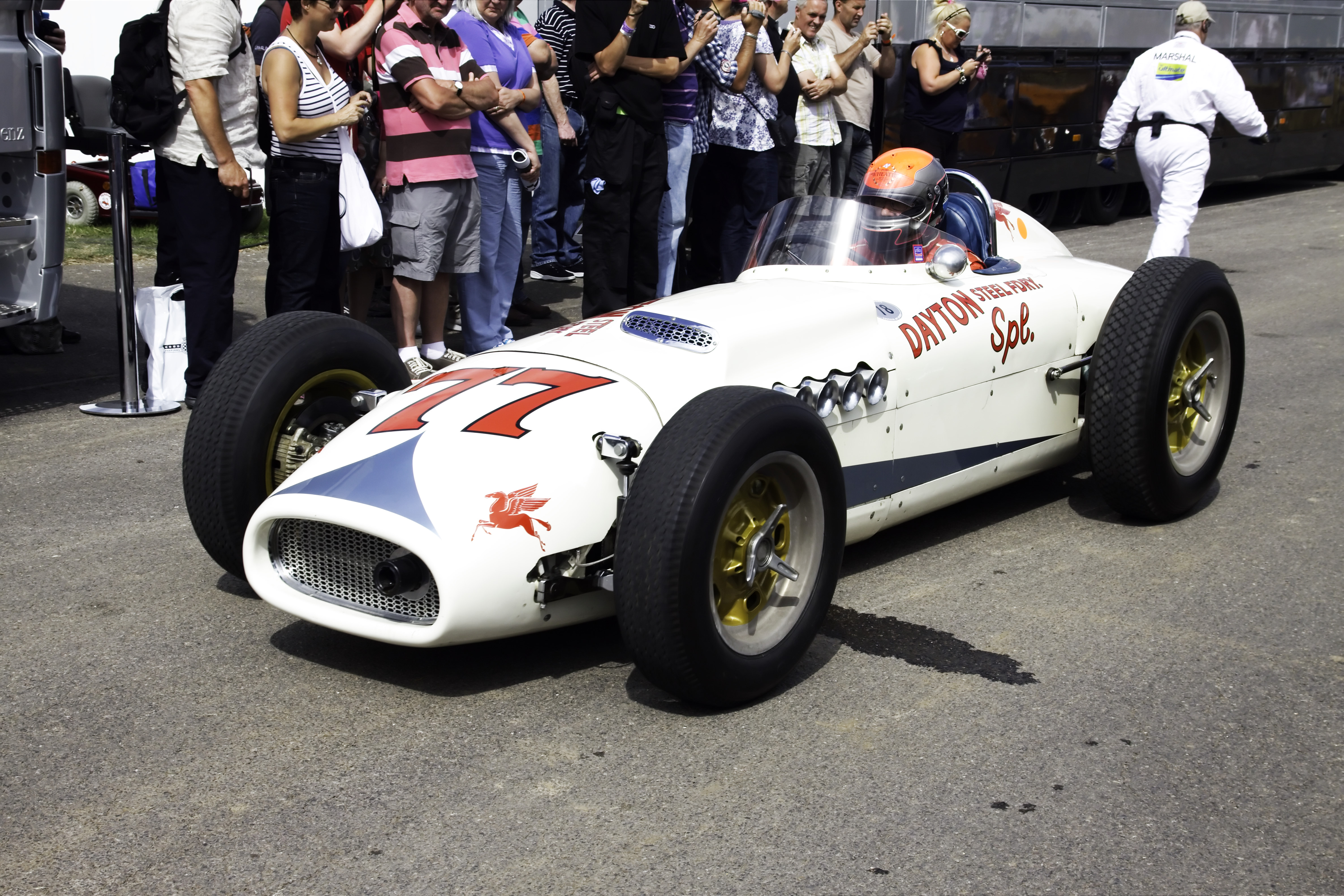
#77 Kurtis Kraft-Offenhauser "Dayton Steel Foundry Special" which Fangio tried to qualify for the 1958 Indy 500

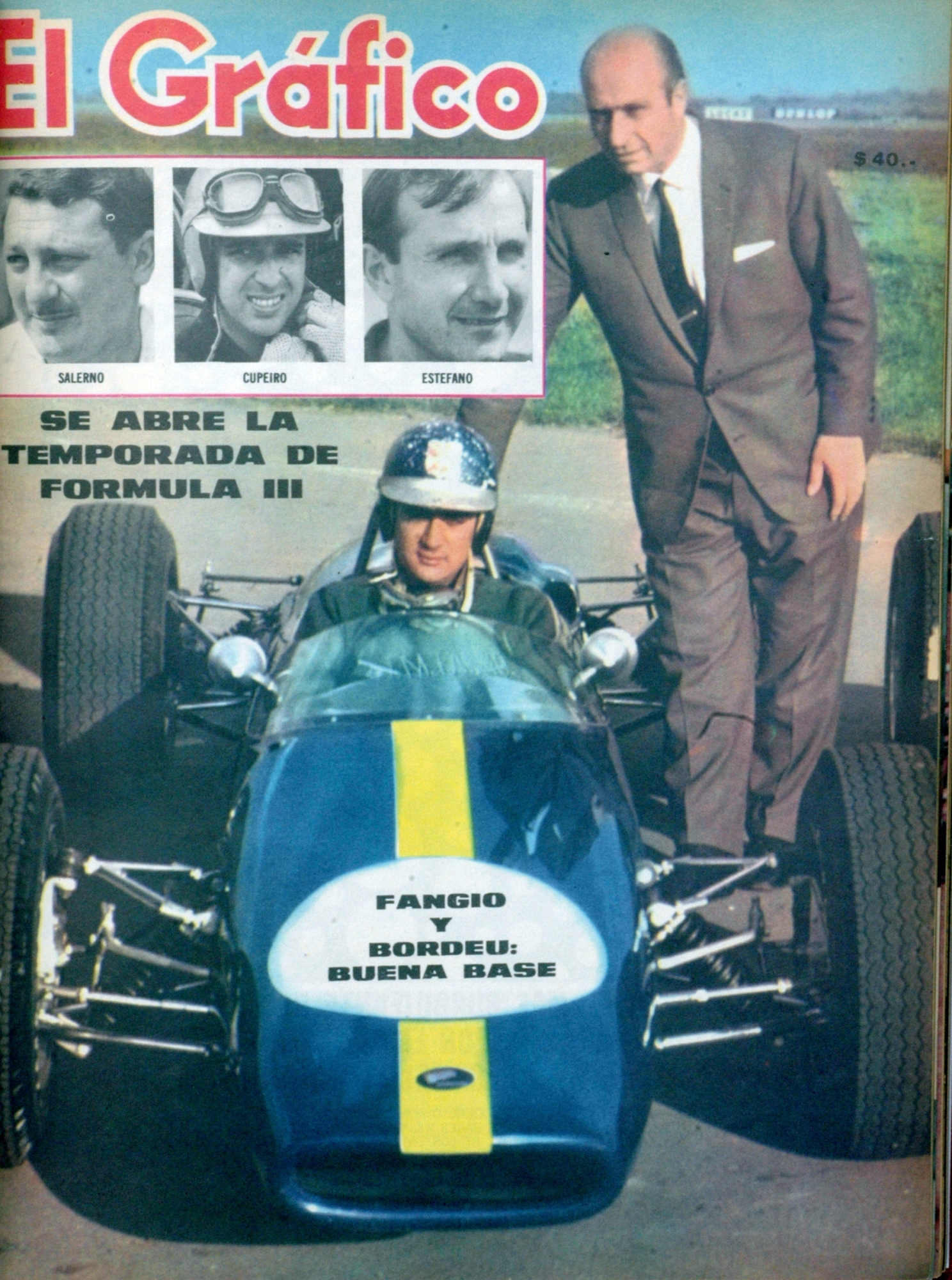
Fangio and Juan Manuel Bordeu, racer and personal friend of the former racer in 1966.

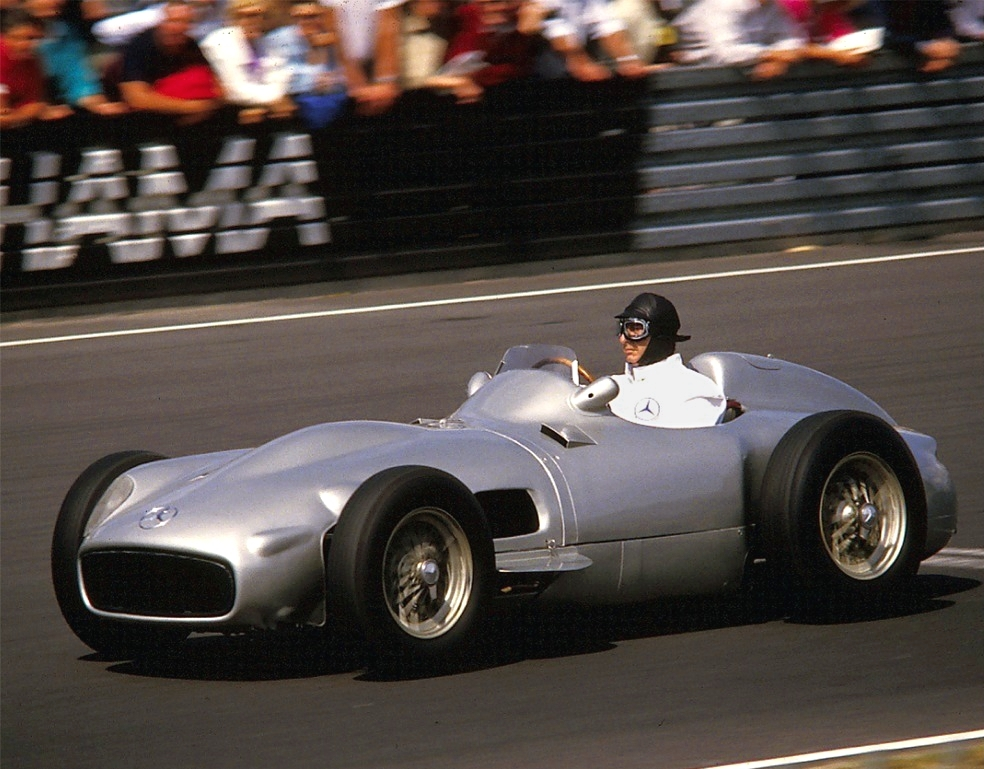
Juan Manuel Fangio driving a Mercedes-Benz W196 in the 1986 Oldtimer Grand Prix at the Nürburgring

In September 1957, Fangio was involved in a road accident in Bologna when he was forced to swerve to avoid an oncoming truck. The car, a Lancia Aurelia GT, clipped a pole, spinning twice and threw Fangio out, which led him to sustain grazed elbows. Cesare Perdisa stated the incident was the first time Fangio had been so terrified.

When Fangio attended the 1958 Indianapolis 500, he was offered $20,000 to qualify the No. 77 Kurtis-Offenhauser by the car's owner, George Walther, Jr , owner of Dayton Steel Foundry and father of future Indy 500 driver Salt Walther). Fangio had previously attended the 1948 Indy 500 at which time he expressed his interest in competing the race. Fangio also tried the #54 car which was not powered by the common 4.2 liter 4-cylinder "Offy", but by the supercharged V8 Novi engine that was very powerful but never succeeded at Indy. Both cars also wore the red Pegasus logo of Mobil Oil. However, Fangio was not interested in participating with cars that did not give him a chance to win. Walther allowed Fangio to stand aside (before a contract with BP came to light). Both cars were barely qualified by other drivers, for the last row of the grid only.

After his retirement, Fangio was distinguished as honorary President of the Automobile Sports Commission of the Argentine Republic. He also participated in many world exhibition races, tributes to motorsport figures and in the organization of events related to his profession. In 1960 he carried out an exhibition at the Sarmiento Park in Córdoba city, with a Maserati 2500 of Ettore Chimeri, with which he suffered a run off the track, brushed a curb and accidentally lifted into the air without consequences. He became honorary president of the Club International des Anciens Pilotes de Grand Prix F1 in 1962.

In 1968, Fangio collaborated with Automóvil Club Argentino in the organization of the Formula 2 International Championship held in Argentina, a task that would become constant during the following years. Shortly thereafter, he headed the "84 Hours of Nürburgring" project for Argentine-made IKA-Renault Torino cars and traveled to Germany as a driver advisor with the Argentine team.

Fangio took part in the so-called "Carrera del Recuerdo", held on 17 October 1973 at the Autódromo de Buenos Aires with a Fiat Berlina 125. Legendary motorsport figures such as Oscar Alfredo Gálvez also took part in the race.

Fangio served as the flagman for the Argentine Grand Prix from 1972 to 1981, and for NASCAR's Winston 500 in 1975.

Fangio was appointed president of Mercedes-Benz Argentina in April 1974 and the following year, he was part of an exhibition test in Dijon on the occasion of the Swiss Grand Prix aboard a Maserati 250F. On the 50th anniversary of the Nürburgring circuit, Fangio took part in the Fifth International Race of Historic Racing and Sports Cars, called "Parade of Remembrance", with the Mercedes-Benz W196 R. In 1979 he raced at the English circuit of Donington Park on the occasion of an event organized by the Gunnar Nilsson Foundation.

Fangio was the special guest of the 50th anniversary 1978 Australian Grand Prix at the Sandown Raceway in Melbourne (seven years before the Australian Grand Prix became a round of the World Championship in 1985). After awarding the Lex Davison Trophy to race winner Graham McRae (who stated that meeting Fangio was a bigger thrill than actually winning the race for the third time), Fangio drove his 1954 and 1955 World Championship-winning Mercedes-Benz W196 in a spirited three lap exhibition against three other cars, including the 1966 World Championship winning Brabham BT19 driven by Australia's own triple World Champion Jack Brabham. Despite his car being over ten years older than the Repco Brabham, Fangio pushed the Australian all the way to the flag. Before the event, Fangio (who at 67 years of age and not having raced competitively in 20 years, still held a full FIA Super Licence) had stated his intention of racing and not just putting in a demonstration drive.

After racing in the Brussels Rally in 1981, Fangio participated aboard a Chevrolet TC in the Gran Premio del Recuerdo, a caravan held in 1983 through the center of the Buenos Aires city to raise funds for the Patronato de la Infancia and the Asociación de Ayuda al Menor of the Buenos Aires province.

In 1980, Konex Foundation granted him the Diamond Konex Award as the best Sportsman of the decade in Argentina. In 1981, Fangio travelled to Monza for the Italian Grand Prix, where he was reunited with his Tipo 159 Alfa Romeo from 1951 and the 1954 Lancia D50 for a couple of demonstrative laps. For the event Fangio was joined by old friends and fellow racers, including Toulo de Graffenried, Luigi Villoresi and Giorgio Scarlatti as well as former Alfa Romeo managers from the 1950s Paolo Marzotto and Battista Guidotti.

Fangio met the young Brazilian driver Ayrton Senna at the opening of the Grand Prix Strecke, the short circuit inside the Nürburgring Norschleiffe, in 1984. After that initial meeting, the five-time champion told the young driver, "Now I understand why people speak so highly of you". The good chemistry between the two drivers was immediate, and over time the friendship was firmly forged. Senna often traveled to Argentina to meet with Fangio, where, among other things, the young Brazilian would ask the champion for advice on how to run better on the circuits, and the experienced former driver would happily give it to him. One of Senna's trips to Argentina to see Fangio saved the Brazilian driver from a dangerous situation: in those days, Comando Vermelho, one of the most powerful and dangerous narco-criminal groups in Brazil, had planned to kidnap Senna.

In the 1990 Australian Grand Prix, which was held on the Adelaide streets, Formula 1 celebrated its 500th race and to celebrate it, they staged a photo-op that would go down in history. They brought together several champions: Nelson Piquet (active driver), Jack Brabham, James Hunt, Jackie Stewart, Denny Hulme, Senna and the Chueco. Ayrton raised Fangio's arm, as if he were the judge of a boxing match, giving his blessing to the winner. After the event, the Argentinean former driver invited the then McLaren driver to Argentina to celebrate that season's title.

Fangio was inducted into the International Motorsports Hall of Fame in 1990. He returned to the spotlight in 1994, when he publicly opposed a new Province of Buenos Aires law denying driving licences to those over 80 (which included Fangio). Denied a renewal of his card, Fangio reportedly challenged Traffic Bureau personnel to a race between Buenos Aires and seaside Mar del Plata (a 400 km (250 mi) distance) in two hours or less, following which an exception was made for the five-time champion.

Senna would later invite Fangio again to the 1993 Brazilian Grand Prix race held at the Interlagos circuit in São Paulo, where the Brazilian driver emerged victorious. Senna celebrated his victory with Fangio, the last time they were seen together in public. Both drivers would later have private meetings where Senna would often travel to Argentina or Fangio would travel to Senna's house in Brazil. When Senna died in an accident at the San Marino Grand Prix in May 1994, Fangio deeply mourned the driver's death. "I have lost my heir and successor" said Fangio at the time, showing his regret for the death of the young Brazilian driver. The former driver participated in Senna's funeral, and the subsequent burial, which was held with honors worthy of a state funeral due to the driver's great popularity, at the Morumbi Cemetery.

Fangio was appointed honorary president of Mercedes-Benz Argentina in 1987, the only distinction granted in its history by the German company, and held the position until 1994. Fangio was appointed president of the Renault Foundation in 1990 and continued to make public appearances especially in international exhibition races until his health began to deteriorate. He held his last competition on the Sardinia Island in 1993 aboard an Alfetta 159 in the company of other figures of his time.

==== Juan Manuel Fangio Motorsport Museum ====
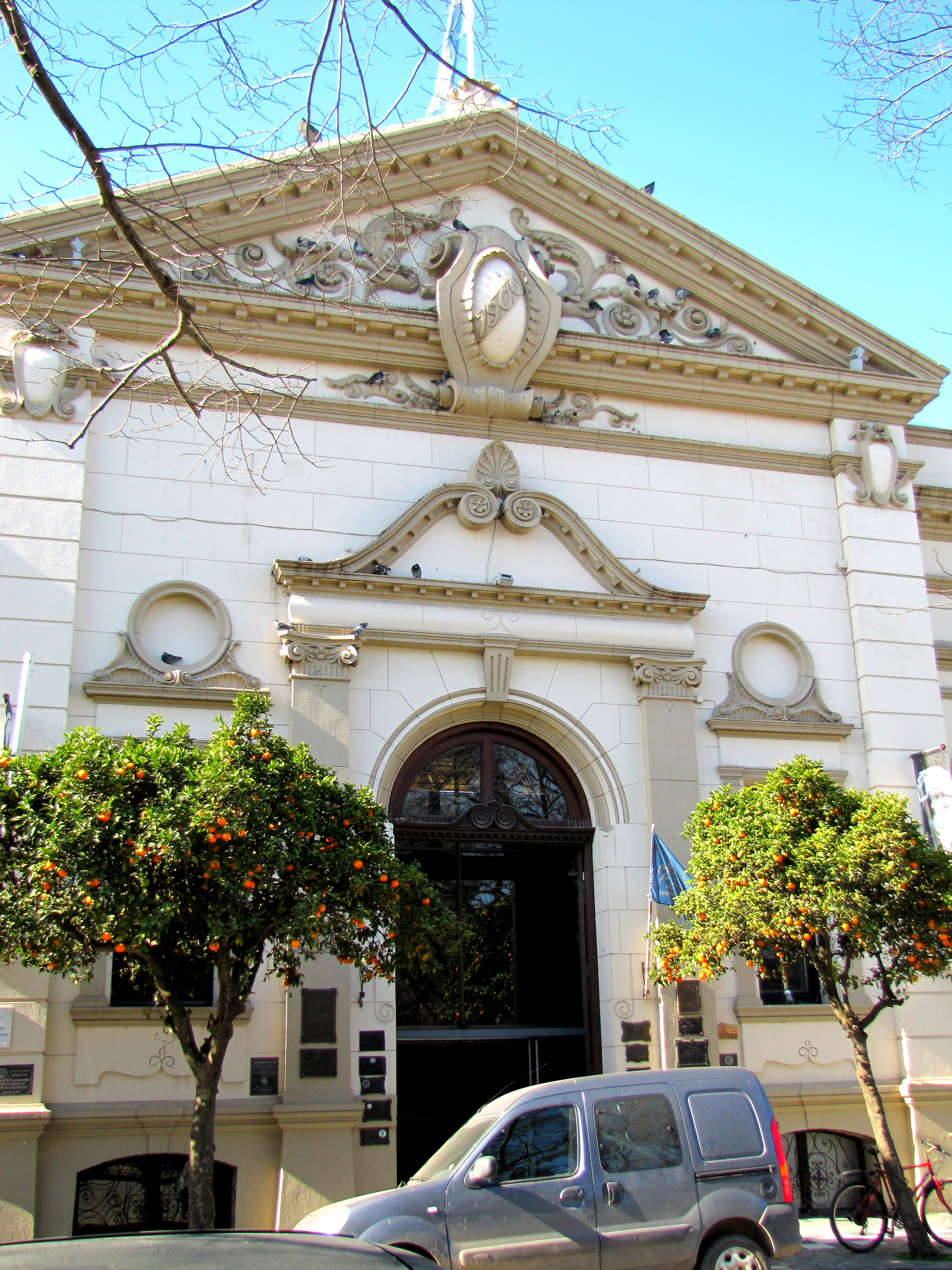
Juan Manuel Fangio Motorsport Museum.

In 1979, some residents of the city of Balcarce began to promote the formation of a work commission to the construction of a Museum when they learned of Fangio's intention to gather all his trophies, cars and presents accumulated throughout his life sports in one place. On 26 October of that year, the "Juan Manuel Fangio Motorsport Pro-Museum Commission" was established under municipal support.

An old building from 1906, in which the Municipality and the Deliberative Council of Balcarce had functioned, was chosen to establish the museum. Although the building had been closed for years, and was in a deplorable state of conservation, it occupied a lot of significant proportions and was located in the southern corner of the town's main square. The community history of the building generated a desire to recover it as the city's architectural heritage.

Aware at the end of 1980 of the proposal of the Pro-museum Commission, Province of Buenos Aires De facto Governor, Ibérico Saint Jean, promoted it and provided the initial capital that made the bidding and the beginnings possible. of the work.

The economic contributions, which given the inflationary process was close to 18% of the cost (at the beginning it represented 75%-80%), was expanded with donations from national and international companies, people adhering to the project, contributions from Fangio himself and was completed with different activities organized by the commission.

The former racer donated all his trophies and a wide variety of automobiles to the municipality of Balcarce in 1983 for later presentation at the Museum. Finally, on 22 November 1986, the Juan Manuel Fangio Technological-Cultural Center and Automobile Museum was inaugurated.

The restoration of the building and its contents caused astonishment among visitors and world journalists, leading it to be described as the most important motorsports museum in South America and the best dedicated to a competitive driver.

Upon concluding its objective, the Pro-Museum Commission was dissolved. However, at the request of Fangio and Juan Manuel Bordeu, the Juan Manuel Fangio Automobile Museum Foundation was created, an entity that manages and governs the destiny of the museum and is responsible for preserving, maintaining and increasing Fangio's sports heritage.

=== Health decline and death ===
Fangio's health deteriorated in the last decades of his life. In December 1970, he suffered a serious heart attack and in 1981, after exhibiting a Mercedes-Benz 300 SLR in Dubai, he had another heart attack. The following year he was subjected to a surgical intervention in which the renowned Cardiologist Doctor René Favaloro implanted five bypass.

In the late 1980s, Fangio was diagnosed with chronic kidney failure and in 1992, he underwent surgery to remove a benign tumor from his kidneys. He suffered an intestinal infection in 1993 in Stuttgart, for which he had to be hospitalized. At the end of that year he had to be admitted again for fifteen days to the Mater Dei Clinic due to blood hypercalcemia. In his last years he had to undergo three weekly sessions of dialysis by Doctor Roque Sala at the same time that he began with a progressive loss of consciousness and motor problems derived from his previous pathologies. After an emergency hospitalization in January 1995, he confined himself to his home in Palermo Viejo, where he continued with treatment and abandoned practically all his public appearances.

On 14 July 1995, Fangio suffered from respiratory failure with excess phlegm that led to his admission to the Mater Dei Clinic, where he was diagnosed with bronchopneumonia. One day later he had a respiratory crisis and his diagnosis worsened on 16 July when he suffered a deterioration in his state of health that until then had remained stable. Fangio died on 17 July 1995 at 84 years old at 4:10 AM UTC-3 in Buenos Aires.

After learning of the death of Fangio, President of the Nation Argentina Carlos Saúl Menem arranged the White Room of the Casa Rosada for his funeral. His pallbearers were his younger brother Ruben Renato ("Toto"), fellow racing icons Stirling Moss and Jackie Stewart, compatriot champions José Froilán González and Carlos Reutemann, and the president of Mercedes-Benz Argentina at the time.

The president of FIFA, João Havelange, expressed his condolences and Jackie Stewart, three-time Formula 1 world champion and personal friend of Fangio, decided to travel for the funeral. The president of the FIA, Max Mosley, immediately traveled to Argentina upon learning of Fangio's death.

After the first funeral at the Casa Rosada, the remains of the former racer were transferred for a new funeral at the headquarters of the Automóvil Club Argentino and then a last funeral was held at the Fangio Museum before finally being placed in the family pantheon of the Balcarce Cemetery.

In 2021, the remains of Fangio were moved from the Balcarce Cemetery to the Museum that bears his name, in the same city where he was born and grew up more than 110 years ago, being the culmination of a ceremony that lasted two days full of tributes to Fangio, coinciding also with the 70th anniversary of his first Formula 1 victory. The ceremony was attended by Oscar "Cacho", Ruben and Juan Carlos, the three sons of the quintuple champion, together with outstanding national and world motorsport personalities such as Sir Jackie Stewart, Oreste Berta and Horacio Pagani, who were also Fangio's friends. After the Roman Catholic religious service, officiated by the Mar del Plata's Bishop, the coffin with the remains of the former racer was placed in a special vault in the Museum, next to the trophies he won and some of the cars with which he had his successful racing career.

== Personal life ==
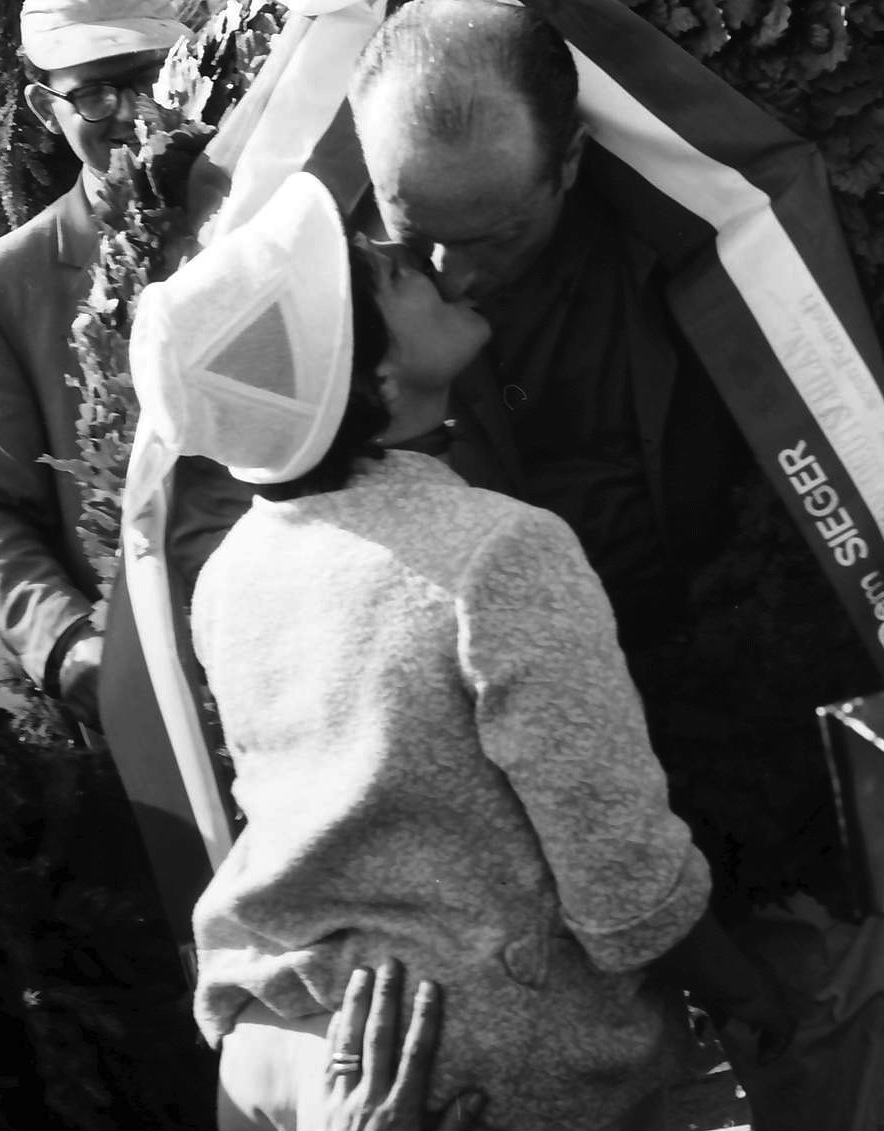
Andrea Berruet congratulates Fangio after his victory in the 1957 German Grand Prix.

Fangio never married, but was romantically involved for more than twenty years with Andrea “Beba” Berruet, with whom he had a son on 6 April 1938: Oscar “Cacho” Espinoza. He was registered with the surname of Berruet's husband, Luis Alcides Espinoza, because they were not legally separated, since at that time civil divorce did not yet exist in Argentina.

The relationship between Berruet and Fangio did not last beyond the racer's sporting retirement in the early 1960s, but shortly before, in 1955, Fangio began legal proceedings for the adoption of his own eldest son, something he abandoned shortly thereafter.

Espinoza, who as a child and teenager lived alternating between Mar del Plata (where his parents visited him every time Fangio returned to Argentina) and Balcarce, where he usually spent most of his time with his paternal grandparents, Loreto and Herminia, would soon begin to develop an interest in motor racing, which caused the first frictions with his father, since Juan Manuel was against his son starting to compete.

As an adult, and against his father's wishes (Fangio wanted his son to study Medicine at the University), "Cacho" began to participate in zonal karting competitions, later jumping to Turismo Carretera, where he stood out competing at the wheel of a Renault Gordini that was nicknamed Trueno Dorado.

Espinoza's first opportunity to try to obtain his real last name was in 1966. Due to his outstanding performance in Turismo Carretera, "Cacho" had the opportunity to compete in the European Formula Two Championship. Because he had to renew his passport to travel to Europe, and the renewal process was delayed, Juan Manuel told his son that the only chance to get his passport renewed as quickly as possible was to add the surname Fangio to his Identity Card, and that was how it was given. Thus began his professional career in motorsport as "Cacho" Fangio, although it was known that this was only a patch and not a concrete reality.

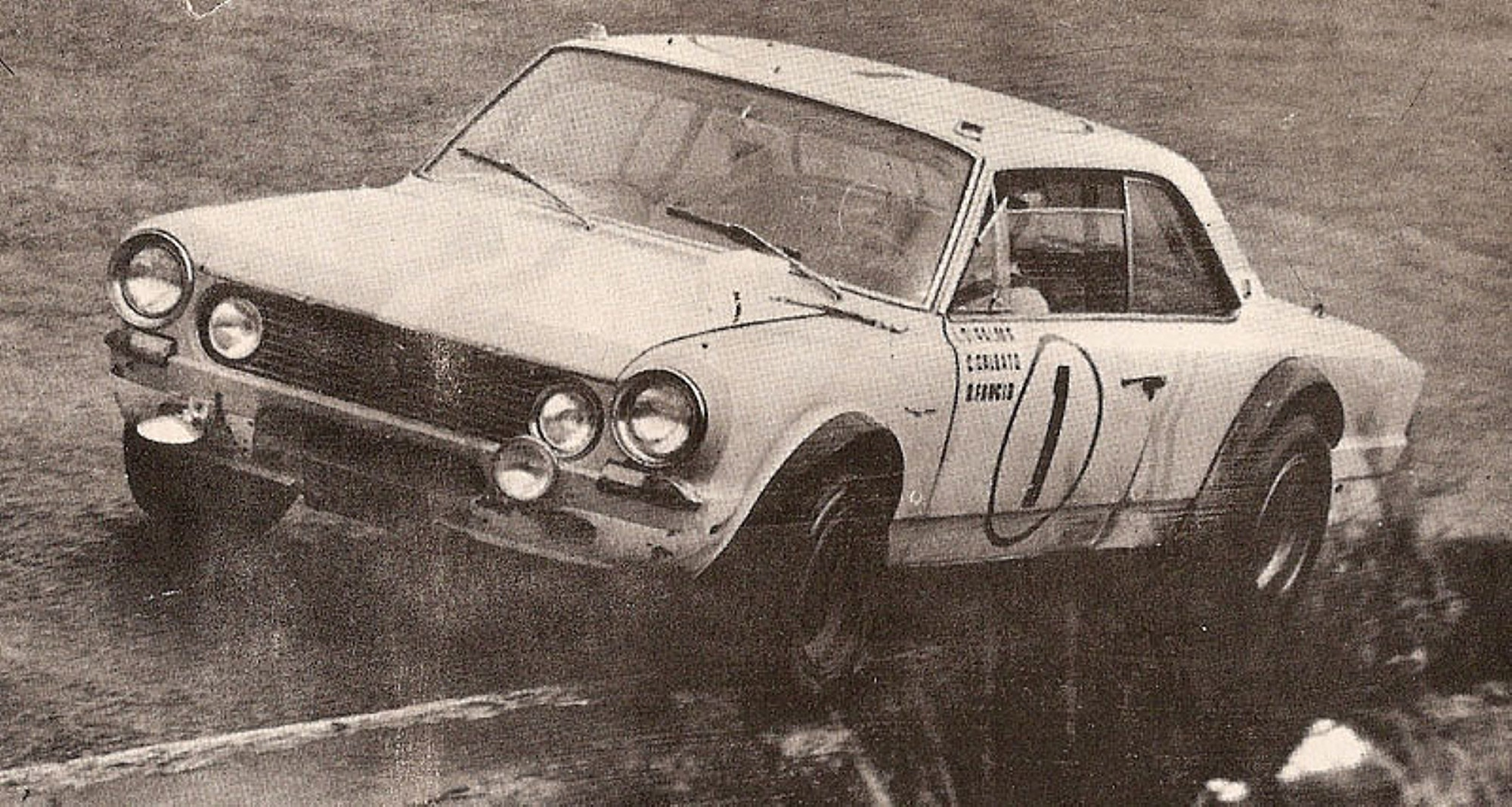
Torino 380W driven by "Cacho" Fangio (Juan Manuel Fangio's eldest son), Luis Rubén Di Palma and Carmelo Galbato during the so-called "Argentine Mission" of the 84 hours of Nürburgring in August 1969

"Cacho" even participated in the Argentine Mission, organized by his father, of the 84 Hours of Nürburgring in August 1969, where national cars IKA Torino, prepared by the renowned mechanic Oreste Berta, competed.

In the 1970s, the relationship between Fangio and his eldest son deteriorated almost completely. The former driver had promised his son that if he ever started a family and had children, he would legally recognize him and give him his surname. "Cacho" had already married and started a family, but Fangio did not keep his promise to his son, which led him to file a paternity suit against Fangio, repudiating Luis Alcides Espinoza's paternity. The lawsuit was rejected in First and Second Instance by the National Civil Court of the Capital Federal. Fangio and his son stopped talking to each other for many years. Even, in the homage that the President of the Nation Argentina Carlos Saúl Menem paid to the former racer in 1994 for the 25th anniversary of the 84 Hours of Nürburgring 1969, they met again and only shook hands. The following year, with Fangio's health deteriorating, they met again at the racer's home in Buenos Aires, where father and son were able to reconcile and have a quiet chat, being the last time Fangio was able to see his eldest son, shortly time before his death.

In 2000, Espinoza publicly admitted in an interview to Olé that he was the former racer's unrecognized son and in 2008 he initiated a case in a Buenos Aires civil court to prove his filiation and to be able to use his paternal surname.

After Fangio's death, it was “Cacho's” youngest daughter, Carolina, who urged her father to continue with the parentage claim even though the former racer was no longer physically present. Espinoza stopped the filiation claim because his daughter, who had urged him to continue with the claim, died of Cancer in 2011. "Cacho" was plunged into sadness by the death of his daughter and only two years later was he able to resume the search for his true identity.

In 2005, Rubén Juan Vázquez, a former railway and hotelier employee born in Balcarce and currently residing in the town of Cañuelas, filed a paternity suit similar to the one already filed by "Cacho" Espinoza to find out if he is indeed also Fangio's son. Born 4 years after Espinoza (on 25 June 1942, the day after Fangio's 31st birthday), Vázquez claimed to be the fruit of an extramarital relationship between his mother, Catalina Basili, and Fangio, whom he met when Rubén's maternal half-brother, Ricardo Vázquez, suffered an accident while working in the mechanical workshop that the racer owned in Balcarce. The extramarital relationship between Basili and Fangio that later resulted in the pregnancy was a secret that not even Pedro Antonio Vázquez, Basili's husband, knew about during his lifetime. Fangio was Vázquez's baptismal godfather, and even at one point, at that time without knowing or suspecting that he was his biological father, he turned to the former racer to ask for a recommendation to go to work at Mercedes Benz, due to the difference salaries since they paid better salaries in the automotive industry than in the Railway, where Vázquez worked at that time.

Rubén's first suspicion about his true identity arose in 1995 when he worked in a Hotel in Pinamar. A doctor, a client of the Hotel, noticed Vázquez's physical resemblance to Fangio, and after a conversation with Rubén in which he told him he was from Balcarce and was the former race driver godson, the doctor told him that when he took a DNA test he was going to get a big surprise.

After ten years and after receiving an increasing number of comments about his resemblance to Fangio, not only physically but also in his voice, in 2005 Vázquez decided to confront his mother to find out the truth about whether or not he was the son of the former racer, although she was still weighed down by the extramarital relationship she had had with the “Chueco” decades ago. After several refusals, Basili finally confessed the truth to his son. Vázquez turned to the Law firm of the renowned Lawyer Miguel Ángel Pierri and his partner, Lisandro Faisal, who initiated the filiation case that would determine if Vázquez was indeed Fangio's son.

Catalina Basili died in December 2012, at 103 years old, but shortly before her death she had signed a deed before a Notary Public admitting that her son was the fruit of a relationship with Fangio.

In order to initially follow up on the filiation lawsuit filed by Espinoza, on 16 July 2015, the Civil and Commercial Judge of Mar del Plata, Rodrigo Cataldo, ordered the exhumation of Fangio's body from the Municipal Cemetery of Balcarce, which took place on 7 August of the same year. After the exhumation and in order to extract samples from the racer's remains, experts sent by the Civil and Commercial Judge of La Plata, Daniel Dipp, who was in charge of Rubén Vázquez's filiation case, were also present. The samples were sent to laboratories in La Plata, where they were compared with the blood samples of Espinoza and Vázquez In December 2015, the Court confirmed that Espinosa was indeed Fangio's son, and in February 2016, it was confirmed that Rubén Vázquez was also Fangio's son.

In June 2016, Juan Carlos Rodríguez, a retired Agricultural Engineer, born in 1945 in Balcarce and currently residing in the same City, underwent an initial DNA study with Oscar Fangio, who had known each other for more than three decades, although at that time both did not know they were brothers, because although Rodríguez knew that his father was Juan Manuel, “Cacho” believed that Rodríguez was the son of Rubén Renato Aniceto Fangio, “Toto”, the younger brother of the racer and father of the also racing driver Juan Manuel Fangio II.

Juan Carlos was the fruit of a brief relationship between Silvia Rodriguez, who was fifteen years old at the time, and the racer, who was already thirty-three years old. The genetic result between Rodriguez and Cacho Fangio was that they are brothers with a certainty of almost 98%, which would lead to the conclusion that Rodriguez would also be the son of Juan Manuel, although the next step was still missing, which was to perform the same study by matching the DNA samples of Rodriguez with those extracted from the remains of the “Chueco”.“

In May 2021, DNA studies confirmed that Juan Carlos Rodriguez is also Fangio's son.

In June 2018, Oscar and Rubén Fangio became the heirs of the multimillion-dollar fortune that their father amassed during his years in motorsport, thus displacing their cousins, the former racer's nephews, who had been left with most of the material assets after Fangio's death. Some time later, the youngest of the three Fangio brothers, Juan Carlos, joined as the third heir to the fortune.

His nephew, Juan Manuel Fangio II, is also a racing driver.

== Legacy ==
"You must always strive to be the best, but you must never believe that you are."

— Juan Manuel Fangio

Fangio's record of five World Championship titles stood for 46 years until German driver Michael Schumacher surpassed it in 2003. Schumacher said, "Fangio is on a level much higher than I see myself. What he did stands alone and what we have achieved is also unique. I have such respect for what he achieved. You can't take a personality like Fangio and compare him with what has happened today. There is not even the slightest comparison." When Lewis Hamilton equaled Fangio's five titles in 2018 he praised Fangio calling him the "Godfather of our sport".

In October 2020, The Economist ranked champion drivers by the relative importance of car quality to driver skill. According to this ranking, Fangio is Formula 1's best driver of all time.

In November 2020, Carteret Analytics used quantitative analysis methods to rank Formula One drivers. According to this ranking, Fangio is Formula 1's best driver of all time. Similar mathematical analysis has also placed Fangio as the greatest of all time, once the era of racing was considered.

In his home country of Argentina, Fangio is revered as one of the greatest sportsmen the nation has ever produced. He is nicknamed El Maestro (the master).

"What he did in his time is something that was an example of professionalism, of courage, of style and as a man, a human being. Every year there is a winner of the championship, but not necessarily a world champion. I think Fangio is the example of a true world champion"

— Ayrton Senna

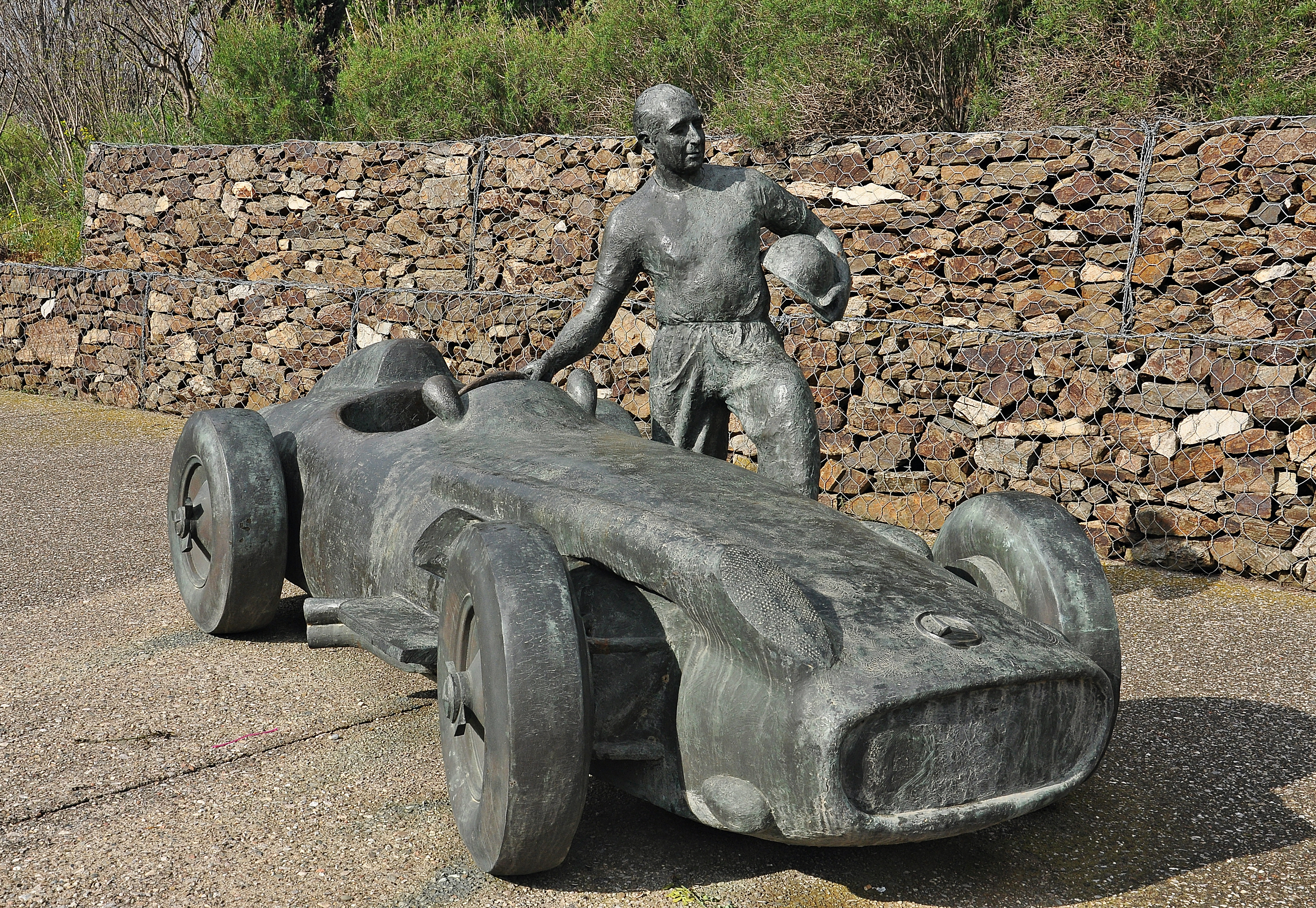
Statue of Fangio by Joaquim Ros Sabaté at the Circuit de Barcelona-Catalunya.

Six statues of Fangio, sculpted by Catalan artist Joaquim Ros Sabaté, stand at race venues around the world: Puerto Madero, Buenos Aires; Monte Carlo, Monaco; Montmeló, Spain; Nürburgring, Germany; Stuttgart-Untertürkheim, Germany; and Monza, Italy.

The Museo Juan Manuel Fangio was established in Balcarce (Fangio's birthplace) in 1986.

Argentina's largest oil company, Repsol YPF, launched the "Fangio XXI" gas brand. The Zonda 2005 C12 F, also known as the Zonda Fangio, was designed in honour of Fangio and was released 10 years after his death. Maserati created a special website in 2007 to commemorate the 50th anniversary of his fifth and final world championship triumph. A Mercedes-Benz W196R Formula 1 race car, driven by Fangio in his World Championship-qualifying Grand Prix races in 1954 and 1955 was sold for a record $30 million at an auction in England on 12 July 2013.

In Australian English slang the term to 'fang it', derived from an abbreviation of Fangio's surname, means to move at high speed, usually in a vehicle. Popularised by the movie Mad Max, early recorded use is in the Australian playwright Alexander Buzo's 1969 The Front Room Boys, scene 1.

Due to the pilot's family's close ties to Castiglione Messer Marino, a sister city agreement (gemellaggio) with Balcarce was officially established in 2010 and subsequently reaffirmed in 2015 and 2025. The initiative sought to honor the family roots of the legendary five-time Formula 1 world champion, as well as to strengthen cultural and historical ties between the two communities. In 2011, the centennial year of the driver’s birth, a monument to Fangio was unveiled in Castiglione Messer Marino.

In February 2017, as part of the 25th National Motorsports Festival held in Balcarce, and in the presence of the Castiglione Messer Marino mayor and officials, a monolith was unveiled bearing the inscription Balcarce, in sisterhood with Castiglione Messer Marino, birthplace of the father of five-time F1 world champion Juan Manuel Fangio.

== Racing record ==
=== Career highlights ===
Season	Series	Position	Team	Car
1940	Turismo Carretera Argentina	**1st**		Chevrolet Cupé
	Gran Premio Internacional del Norte	**1st**		Chevrolet 40 Cupé
1941	Turismo Carretera Argentina	**1st**		Chevrolet Cupé
	Gran Premio "Getulio Vargas" Brasil	**1st**		Chevrolet 40 Cupé
	Mil Millas Argentinas	**1st**		Chevrolet 40 Cupé
1947	Premios Primavera Mecánica Argentine	**1st**		Volpi-Chevrolet
	Premio de Mecánica Argentina	**1st**		Ford-Chevrolet T
	Premio de Mecánica Rioplatense	**1st**		Volpi-Chevrolet
	Turismo Carretera Argentina	3rd		Chevrolet Cupé Model 39
	Gran Premio de Buenos Aires	3rd		Ford-Chevrolet T
	Gran Premio de Vendima	3rd		Ford-Chevrolet T
1948	Premio Doble vuelta Ciudad de Coronel Pringles	**1st**		Chevrolet Cupé
	Gran Premio Otoño	**1st**		Volpi-Chevrolet
	Gran Premio Ciudad de Mercedes	**1st**		Volpi-Chevrolet
	Premio Cien Millas Playas de Necochea	3rd		Volpi-Chevrolet
	Turismo Carretera Argentina	4th		Chevrolet Cupé
1949	Premio Jean Pierre Wimille	**1st**		Volpi-Chevrolet
	Gran Premio Mar del Plata	**1st**		Maserati 4CLT/48
	Premio Fraile Muerto	**1st**		Volpi-Chevrolet
	Gran Premio di San Remo	**1st**	Scuderia Achille Varzi	Maserati 4CLT/48
	Grand Prix de Pau	**1st**		Maserati 4CLT/48
	Grand Prix du Roussillon	**1st**	Automóvil Club Argentino	Maserati 4CLT/48
	Grand Prix de Marseille	**1st**	Scuderia Achille Varzi	Simca-Gordini T15
	Gran Premio dell'Autodromo di Monza	**1st**	A.C.A. Achille Varzi	Ferrari 166 F2
	Gran Premio Internacional San Martín	**1st**	Automóvil Club Argentino	Maserati 4CLT/48
	Grand Prix de l'Albigeois	**1st**	Automóvil Club Argentino	Maserati 4CLT/48
	Gran Premio de Eva Duarte Perón	2nd	Automóvil Club Argentino	Maserati 4CLT/48
	Gran Premio del General Juan Perón y de la Ciudad de Buenos Aires	2nd	Automóvil Club Argentino	Ferrari 166 F2
	Turismo Carretera Argentina	3rd		Chevrolet Cupé
1950	Grand Prix de Pau	**1st**	Automóvil Club Argentino	Maserati 4CLT/48
	Gran Premio di San Remo	**1st**	Scuderia Alfa Romeo	Alfa Romeo 158
	Grand Prix Automobile de Monaco	**1st**	Alfa Romeo SpA	Alfa Romeo 158
	Grand Prix d'Angoulême	**1st**	Automóvil Club Argentino	Maserati 4CLT/48
	Grote Prijs van Belgie	**1st**	Alfa Romeo SpA	Alfa Romeo 158
	Grand Prix de l'A.C.F.	**1st**	Alfa Romeo SpA	Alfa Romeo 158
	Grand Prix des Nations	**1st**	Alfa Romeo SpA	Alfa Romeo 158
	Circuito di Pescara	**1st**	Alfa Romeo SpA	Alfa Romeo 158
	Gran Premio de Paraná	**1st**	Automóvil Club Argentino	Ferrari 166 FL
	Gran Premio del Presidente Alessandri	**1st**	Automóvil Club Argentino	Ferrari 166 FL
	500 Millas de Rafaele	**1st**	Anthony Lago	Talbot-Lago T26C
	Formula One World Championship	2nd	Alfa Romeo SpA	Alfa Romeo 158
	Gran Premio di Bari	2nd	Alfa Romeo SpA	Alfa Romeo 158
	Daily Express BRDC International Trophy	2nd	Alfa Romeo SpA	Alfa Romeo 158
	Grand Prix de Marseilles	3rd	Scuderia Achille Varzi	Ferrari 166 F2
	Mille Miglia	3rd		Alfa Romeo 6C 2500 Competitzione Berlinetta
1951	**Formula One World Championship**	**1st**	**Alfa Romeo SpA**	**Alfa Romeo 159**
	Großer Preis der Schweiz	**1st**	Alfa Romeo SpA	Alfa Romeo 159A
	Grand Prix de l'A.C.F.,	**1st**	Alfa Romeo SpA	Alfa Romeo 159A
	Gran Premio di Bari	**1st**	Alfa Romeo SpA	Alfa Romeo 159A
	Gran Premio de España	**1st**	Alfa Romeo SpA	Alfa Romeo 159M
	RAC British Grand Prix	2nd	Alfa Romeo SpA	Alfa Romeo 159B
	Großer Preis von Deutschland	2nd	Alfa Romeo SpA	Alfa Romeo 159B
	Gran Premio del General Juan Perón y de la Ciudad de Buenos Aires	3rd	Daimler-Benz AG	Mercedes-Benz W154
1952	Grande Prêmio de Interlagos	**1st**	A.C.A.	Ferrari 166 FL
	Grande Prêmio da Qunita da Boa Vista	**1st**	A.C.A.	Ferrari 166 FL
	Gran Premio del General Juan Perón y de la Ciudad de Buenos Aires	**1st**	A.C.A.	Ferrari 166 FL
	Gran Premio Maria Eva Duarte de Perón y de la Ciudad de Buenos Aires	**1st**	A.C.A.	Ferrari 166 FL
	Gran Premio de Uruguay	**1st**	A.C.A.	Ferrari 166 FL
	Gran Premio de Montvideo	**1st**	A.C.A.	Ferrari 166 FL
1953	Vues des Aples	**1st**		Maserati A6GCM/53
	Gran Premio d'Italia	**1st**	Officine Alfieri Alfieri Maserati	Maserati A6GCM/53
	Gran Premio di Modena	**1st**	Officine Alfieri Maserati	Maserati A6GCM/53
	Supercortemaggiore	**1st**	Scuderia Alfa Romeo	Alfa Romeo 6C 3000 CM Spider
	Carrera Panamericana	**1st**	Scuderia Lancia	Lancia D24 Pininfarina
	Formula One World Championship	2nd	Officine Alfieri Maserati	Maserati A6GCM/53
	Mille Miglia	2nd	SP.A. Alfa Romeo	Alfa Romeo 6C 3000 CM
	Gran Premio di Napoli	2nd	Officine Alfieri Maserati	Maserati A6GCM/53
	Grand Prix de l'ACF	2nd	Officine Alfieri Maserati	Maserati A6GCM/53
	Daily Express Trophy	2nd	Owen Racing Organisation	BRM Type 15
	RAC British Grand Prix	2nd	Officine Alfieri Maserati	Maserati A6GCM/53
	Großer Preis von Deutschland	2nd	Officine Alfieri Maserati	Maserati A6GCM/53
	Woodcote Cup	2nd	Owen Racing Organisation	BRM Type 15
	Grand Prix de Bordeaux	3rd	Equipe Gordini	Gordini T16
	Targa Florio	3rd	Officine Alfieri Maserati	Maserati A6GCS/53
1954	**Formula One World Championship**	**1st**	**Officine Alfieri Maserati**; **Daimler Benz AG**	**Maserati A6SSG**; **Mercedes-Benz W196**
	Gran Premio de la Republica Argentina	**1st**	Officine Alfieri Maserati	Maserati A6SSG
	Grand Prix de Belgique	**1st**	Officine Alfieri Maserati	Maserati 250F
	Grand Prix de I'ACF	**1st**	Daimler Benz AG	Mercedes-Benz W196
	Großer Preis von Deutschland	**1st**	Daimler Benz AG	Mercedes-Benz W196
	Großer Preis der Schweiz	**1st**	Daimler Benz AG	Mercedes-Benz W196
	Gran Premio d'Italia	**1st**	Daimler Benz AG	Mercedes-Benz W196
	RAC Tourist Trophy	2nd	Scuderia Lancia	Lancia D24
	Grosser Preis von Berlin	2nd	Daimler Benz AG	Mercedes-Benz W196
	Gran Premio de España	3rd	Daimler Benz AG	Mercedes-Benz W196
1955	**Formula One World Championship**	**1st**	**Daimler Benz AG**	**Mercedes-Benz W196**
	Gran Premio de la Republica Argentina	**1st**	Daimler Benz AG	Mercedes-Benz W196
	Gran Premio de la Ciudad de Buenos Aires	**1st**	Daimler Benz AG	Mercedes-Benz W196
	Internationales ADAC-Eifel-Rennen Nürburgring	**1st**	Daimler Benz AG	Mercedes-Benz 300 SLR
	Grote Prijs van Belgie	**1st**	Daimler Benz AG	Mercedes-Benz W196
	Grote Prijs van Nederland	**1st**	Daimler Benz AG	Mercedes-Benz W196
	Sveriges Grand Prix	**1st**	Daimler Benz AG	Mercedes-Benz 300 SLR
	Gran Premio d'Italia	**1st**	Daimler Benz AG	Mercedes-Benz W196
	Gran Premio de Venezuela	**1st**	Equipo Maserati	Maserati 300S
	Mille Miglia	2nd	Daimler Benz AG	Mercedes-Benz 300 SLR
	RAC British Grand Prix	2nd	Daimler Benz AG	Mercedes-Benz W196
	RAC Tourist Trophy	2nd	Daimler Benz AG	Mercedes-Benz 300 SLR
	Targa Florio	2nd	Daimler Benz AG	Mercedes-Benz 300 SLR
1956	**Formula One World Championship**	**1st**	**Scuderia Ferrari**	**Lancia-Ferrari D50**; **Ferrari D50**
	Gran Premio de la Republica Argentina	**1st**	Scuderia Ferrari	Lancia-Ferrari D50
	Gran Premio de la Ciudad de Buenos Aires	**1st**	Scuderia Ferrari	Lancia-Ferrari D50
	Florida International Grand Prix of Endurance powered by Amoco	**1st**	Scuderia Ferrari	Ferrari 860 Monza
	Gran Premio di Siracusa	**1st**	Scuderia Ferrari	Lancia-Ferrari D50
	RAC British Grand Prix	**1st**	Scuderia Ferrari	Ferrari D50
	Großer Preis von Deutschland	**1st**	Scuderia Ferrari	Ferrari D50
	Grand Prix Automobile de Monaco	2nd	Scuderia Ferrari	Ferrari D50
	Internationales ADAC 1000 Kilometer Rennen auf dem Nürburgring	2nd	Scuderia Ferrari	Ferrari 860 Monza
	Gran Premio d'Italia	2nd	Scuderia Ferrari	Ferrari D50
	Gran Premio de Venezuela	2nd	Scuderia Ferrari	Ferrari 860 Monza
	Supercortemaggiore	3rd	Scuderia Ferrari	Ferrari 500 Mondial
1957	**Formula One World Championship**	**1st**	**Officine Alfieri Maserati**	**Maserati 250F**
	Gran Premio de la Republica Argentina	**1st**	Officine Alfieri Maserati	Maserati 250F
	Gran Premio de la Ciudad de Buenos Aires	**1st**	Officine Alfieri Maserati	Maserati 250F
	Gran Premio de Cuba	**1st**	Scuderia Madunina	Maserati 300S
	12-Hour Florida International Grand Prix of Endurance for The Amoco Trophy	**1st**	Officine Alfieri Maserati	Maserati 450S
	Grand Prix Automobile de Monaco	**1st**	Officine Alfieri Maserati	Maserati 250F
	Circuito de Monsanto	**1st**	Officine Alfieri Maserati	Maserati 300S
	Grand Prix de l'ACF	**1st**	Officine Alfieri Maserati	Maserati 250F
	Großer Preis von Deutschland	**1st**	Officine Alfieri Maserati	Maserati 250F
	Gran Premio de Interlagos	**1st**		Maserati 300S
	Gran Premio de Bos Vista	**1st**		Maserati 300S
	Gran Premio di Pescara	2nd	Officine Alfieri Maserati	Maserati 250F
	Gran Premio d'Italia	2nd	Officine Alfieri Maserati	Maserati 250F
1958	Gran Premio de la Ciudad de Buenos Aires	**1st**	Scuderia Sud Americana	Maserati 250F
	Formula One World Championship	14th	Officine Alfieri Maserati	Maserati 250F

=== Post-World War II Grandes Épreuves results ===
(key)

Year	Entrant	Chassis	Engine	1	2	3	4	5
1948	Equipe Gordini	Simca Gordini T11	Simca-Gordini 1.4 L4	MON	SUI	FRA; Ret	ITA	GBR
1949	Automóvil Club Argentino	Maserati 4CLT/48	Maserati 4CLT 1.5 L4 s	GBR	BEL; Ret	SUI	FRA; Ret	ITA

=== Complete Formula One World Championship results ===
(key) (Races in bold indicate pole position; races in italics indicate fastest lap)

Year	Entrant	Chassis	Engine	1	2	3	4	5	6	7	8	9	10	11	WDC	Pts
1950	Alfa Romeo SpA	Alfa Romeo 158	Alfa Romeo 158 1.5 L8 s	GBR; Ret	**MON**; 1	500	**SUI**; Ret	BEL; 1	**FRA**; 1	**ITA**; Ret*					**2nd**	**27**
1951	Alfa Romeo SpA	Alfa Romeo 159	Alfa Romeo 158 1.5 L8 s	**SUI**; 1	500	**BEL**; 9	**FRA**; 1*	GBR; 2	GER; 2	**ITA**; Ret	ESP; 1				**1st**	**31** **(37)**
1953	Officine Alfieri Maserati	Maserati A6GCM	Maserati A6 2.0 L6	ARG; Ret	500	NED; Ret	**BEL**; Ret*	FRA; 2	GBR; 2	GER; 2	**SUI**; 4*	ITA; 1			**2nd**	**28** **(29 1/2)**
1954	Officine Alfieri Maserati	Maserati 250F	Maserati 250F1 2.5 L6	ARG; 1	500	**BEL**; 1									**1st**	**42** **(57 1/7)**
1954	Daimler Benz AG	Mercedes-Benz W196	Mercedes M196 2.5 L8				**FRA**; 1^{†}	**GBR**; 4^{†}	**GER**; 1	SUI; 1	**ITA**; 1^{†}	ESP; 3			**1st**	**42** **(57 1/7)**
1955	Daimler Benz AG	Mercedes-Benz W196	Mercedes M196 2.5 L8	ARG; 1	**MON**; Ret	500	BEL; 1	**NED**; 1	GBR; 2	**ITA**; 1^{†}					**1st**	**40** **(41)**
1956	Scuderia Ferrari	Lancia-Ferrari D50	Ferrari DS50 2.5 V8	**ARG**; 1*	**MON**; 2*	500	**BEL**; Ret	**FRA**; 4	GBR; 1	**GER**; 1	**ITA**; 2*				**1st**	**30** **(33)**
1957	Officine Alfieri Maserati	Maserati 250F	Maserati 250F1 2.5 L6	ARG; 1	**MON**; 1	500	**FRA**; 1	GBR; Ret	**GER**; 1	**PES**; 2	ITA; 2				**1st**	**40** **(46)**
1958	Scuderia Sud Americana	Maserati 250F	Maserati 250F1 2.5 L6	**ARG**; 4	MON	NED									14th	7
1958	Novi Auto Air Conditioner	Kurtis Kraft 500F	Novi 3.0 L8 s				500; DNQ								14th	7
1958	Juan Manuel Fangio	Maserati 250F	Maserati 250F1 2.5 L6					BEL	FRA; 4	GBR	GER	POR	ITA	MOR	14th	7

* Shared drive.

^{†} Car ran with streamlined, full-width bodywork.

=== Complete non-championship Formula One results ===
(key) (Races in bold indicate pole position; Races in italics indicate fastest lap)

Year	Entrant	Chassis	Engine	1	2	3	4	5	6	7	8	9	10	11	12	13	14	15	16	17	18	19	20	21	22	23	24	25	26	27	28	29	30	31	32	33	34
1950	Scuderia Achille Varzi	Maserati 4CLT/48	Maserati 1.5 s/c straight-4	**PAU**; 1	RIC						**ALB**; Ret	NED; Ret																									
1950	Alfa Romeo SpA	Alfa Romeo 158	Alfa Romeo 1.5 s/c straight-8			SRM; 1	PAR	EMP	BAR; 2	JER			**NAT**; 1	NOT	ULS	**PES**; 1	STT	INT; 2	GOO	PEN																	
1951	Alfa Romeo SpA	Alfa Romeo 159	Alfa Romeo 1.5 s/c straight-8	SYR	PAU	RIC	SRM	BOR	INT; 4		ULS	SCO	NED	ALB	PES	BAR; 1	GOO																				
1951	Equipe Gordini	Simca Gordini Type 11	Gordini 1.5 s/c straight-4							PAR; Ret																											
1952	British Racing Motors	BRM Type 15	BRM P15 1.5 s/c V16	SYR	VAL; DNA	RIC	LAV	PAU	IBS	MAR	AST	INT	ELÄ	NAP	EIF	PAR	**ALB**; Ret	FRO	ULS; Ret																		
1952	Officine Alfieri Maserati	Maserati A6GCM	Maserati 2.0 L6																	MNZ; Ret	LAC	ESS	MAR	SAB	CAE	DMT	COM	NAT	BAU	MOD	CAD	SKA	MAD	AVU	JOE	NEW	
1953	Officine Alfieri Maserati	Maserati A6GCM	Maserati 2.0 L6	SYR	PAU	LAV	AST	BOR; 3	INT	ELÄ	NAP; 2	ULS	WIN	FRO	COR	EIF																		**MOD**; 1	MAD	JOE	CUR
1953	British Racing Motors	BRM Type 15	BRM P15 1.5 s/c V16														**ALB**; Ret	PRI	ESS	MID	ROU	CRY	AVU	USF	LAC	BRI	CHE	SAB	NEW	CAD	RED	SKA	LON				
1954	Officine Alfieri Maserati	Maserati 250F	Maserati 250 2.5 L6	SYR; DNA	PAU	LAV	BOR	INT	BAR	CUR	ROM; DNA	FRO	COR	BRC	CRY	ROU	CAE	AUG	COR	OUL	RED	PES	JOE	CAD													
1954	Daimler Benz AG	Mercedes-Benz W196	Mercedes M196 2.5 L8																						**BER**; 2	GOO	DTT										
1956	Scuderia Ferrari	Ferrari D50	Ferrari DS50 2.5 V8	**BUE**; 1	GLV	**SYR**; 1	AIN	INT; Ret	NAP	100	VNW	CAE	BRH																								
1957	Officine Alfieri Maserati	Maserati 250F	Maserati 250 2.5 L6	**BUE**; 1	SYR	GLV	NAP	**RMS**; 8	CAE	INT	MOD	MOR; 4																									

=== Formula One records ===
Fangio holds the following Formula One records:

Record		Ref
Highest percentage of wins	46.15%	
Highest percentage of pole positions	55.77%	
Highest percentage of front row starts	92.31%	
Highest percentage of fastest laps	45.10%	
Highest percentage of podium finishes	68.63%	
Oldest World Champion	46 years, 41 days	
World Champion with most teams	4	

=== World Sportscar Championship results ===
Year	Entrant	Chassis	Engine	Class	1	2	3	4	5	6	7
1953	S.P.A. Alfa Romeo	Alfa Romeo 6C 3000	Alfa Romeo Straight-6	S +2.0	SEB	MLA; 2	LMS; Ret	SPA; Ret			
1953	Scuderia Lancia	Lancia D24	Lancia V6	S+1.6					**NÜR**; Ret	DUN	CPA; 1
1954	Scuderia Lancia	Lancia D24	Lancia V6	S5.0	BUE	SEB; Ret	MLA	LMS			
1954	Scuderia Lancia	Lancia D25	Lancia V6	S5.0					DUN; Ret	CPA	
1955	Daimler-Benz AG	Mercedes-Benz 300 SLR	Mercedes-Benz Straight-8	S+2.0	BUE	SEB	MLA; 2	LMS; WD	DUN; 2	TGA; 2	
1956	Scuderia Ferrari	Ferrari 410 Sport	Ferrari V12	S+3.0	**BUE**; Ret						
1956	Scuderia Ferrari	Ferrari 860 Monza	Ferrari Straight-4	S+3.0		SEB; 1		**NÜR**; 2	KRI; 2		
1956	Scuderia Ferrari	Ferrari 290 MM	Ferrari V12	S+3.0			MLA; 4				
1957	Officine Alfieri Maserati	Maserati 450S	Maserati V8	S5.0	**BUE**; Ret	SEB; 1	MLA	**NÜR**; Ret	LMS	KRI	CAR
1958	Scuderia Centro Sud	Maserati 300S	Maserati Straight-6	S3.0	BUE; Ret	SEB	TGA	NÜR	LMS	GWD	

=== Complete 24 Hours of Le Mans results ===
Year	Team	Co-Drivers	Car	Class	Laps	Pos.	Class Pos.
1950	(France) Automobiles Gordini	(Argentina) José Froilán González	Gordini T15S	S3.0	95	DNF	DNF
1951	(France) Louis Rosier	(France) Louis Rosier	Talbot-Lago T26C	S5.0	92	DNF	DNF
1953	(Italy) S.P.A. Alfa Romeo	(Argentina) Onofre Marimón	Alfa Romeo 6C 3000 CM	S5.0	22	DNF	DNF
1955	(West Germany) Daimler Benz AG	(United Kingdom) Stirling Moss	Mercedes-Benz 300 SLR	S3.0	134	DNF	DNF

=== Complete 12 Hours of Sebring results ===
Year	Team	Co-Drivers	Car	Class	Laps	Pos.	Class Pos.
1954	(Italy) Scuderia Lancia Co.	(Italy) Eugenio Castellotti	Lancia D24	S5.0	51	DNF	DNF
1956	(Italy) Scuderia Ferrari	(Italy) Eugenio Castellotti	Ferrari 860 Monza	S5.0	194	**1st**	**1st**
1957	(Italy) Maserati Factory	(France) Jean Behra	Maserati 450S	S5.0	197	**1st**	**1st**

=== Complete 24 Hours of Spa ===
Year	Team	Co-Drivers	Car	Class	Laps	Pos.	Class Pos.
1953	(Italy) S.P.A. Alfa Romeo	(Italy) Consalvo Sanesi	Alfa Romeo 6C 3000 CM Spider	S	5	DNF	DNF

=== Complete Mille Miglia results ===
Year	Team	Co-Drivers/Navigator	Car	Class	Pos.	Class Pos.
1950		(Italy) Augusto Zanardi	Alfa Romeo 6C 2500 Competizione	S+2.0	**3rd**	**3rd**
1952		(Italy) Giulio Sala	Alfa Romeo 1900 Sprint	GT2.0	22nd	7th
1953	(Italy) S.P.A. Alfa Romeo	(Italy) Giulio Sala	Alfa Romeo 6C 3000 CM	S+2.0	**2nd**	**2nd**
1955	(West Germany) Daimler Benz AG		Mercedes-Benz 300 SLR	S+2.0	**2nd**	**2nd**
1956	(Italy) Scuderia Ferrari		Ferrari 290 MM	S+2.0	4th	4th

=== Complete Carrera Panamericana results ===
Year	Team	Co-Drivers/Navigator	Car	Class	Pos.	Class Pos.
1953	(Italy) Scuderia Lancia	(Italy) Gino Bronzoni	Lancia D24 Pinin Farina	S+1.6	**1st**	**1st**

=== Indianapolis 500 results ===
Year	Chassis	Engine	Start	Finish	Team	Ref
1958	Kurtis Kraft	Novi	DNQ		Novi Auto Air Conditioner	

== See also ==
- Museo Juan Manuel Fangio

== Notes ==
Sporting positions
Preceded by Ángel Lo Valvo	Turismo Carretera champion 1940–1941	Succeeded by Óscar Alfredo Gálvez
Preceded by Giuseppe Farina	Formula One World Champion; 1951	Succeeded by Alberto Ascari
Preceded by Alberto Ascari	Formula One World Champion; 1954, 1955, 1956, 1957	Succeeded by Mike Hawthorn
Records
Preceded by None	Youngest race leader, for at least one lap in Formula One; 38 years, 323 days (1950 British Grand Prix)	Succeeded by Johnnie Parsons; 31 years, 330 days (1950 Indianapolis 500)
Preceded by Giuseppe Farina; 43 years, 195 days (1950 British GP)	Youngest Grand Prix polesitter 38 years, 331 days (1950 Monaco Grand Prix)	Succeeded by Walt Faulkner; 30 years, 103 days (1950 Indianapolis 500)
Preceded by Giuseppe Farina; 43 years, 195 days (1950 British GP)	Youngest Grand Prix race winner 38 years, 331 days (1950 Monaco Grand Prix)	Succeeded by Johnnie Parsons; 31 years, 330 days (1950 Indianapolis 500)
Preceded by Giuseppe Farina; 43 years, 195 days (1950 British GP)	Youngest driver to set fastest lap in Formula One; 38 years, 331 days (1950 Monaco Grand Prix)	Succeeded by Johnnie Parsons; 31 years, 330 days (1950 Indianapolis 500)
Preceded by None	Youngest Formula One; World Drivers' Championship runner-up 39 years, 71 days (1950 season)	Succeeded by Alberto Ascari; 33 years, 107 days (1951 season)
Preceded by Giuseppe Farina; 43 years, 308 days (1950 season)	Youngest Formula One; World Drivers' Champion; 40 years, 126 days (1951 season)	Succeeded by Alberto Ascari; 34 years, 16 days (1952 season)
Preceded by Giuseppe Farina; 2 wins (1950)	Most Grand Prix wins 6 wins, provisionally, 3rd at the 1950 French GP	Succeeded by Alberto Ascari; 13 wins, 7th at the 1952 Dutch GP
Preceded by Alberto Ascari; 13 wins (1950 – 1955)	Most Grand Prix wins 24 wins, 14th at the 1955 Argentine GP	Succeeded by Jim Clark; 25 wins, 25th at the 1968 South African GP
Preceded by None	Most Grand Prix entries 52 entries, 51 starts (1950 – 1958)	Succeeded by Jean Behra; 53 entries (52 starts), 53rd at the 1959 German GP
Awards and achievements
Preceded by Inaugural award	Olimpia de Oro; 1954	Succeeded by Pascual Pérez
