= Reims-Gueux =

Motor racing circuit in France

Circuit de Reims-Gueux
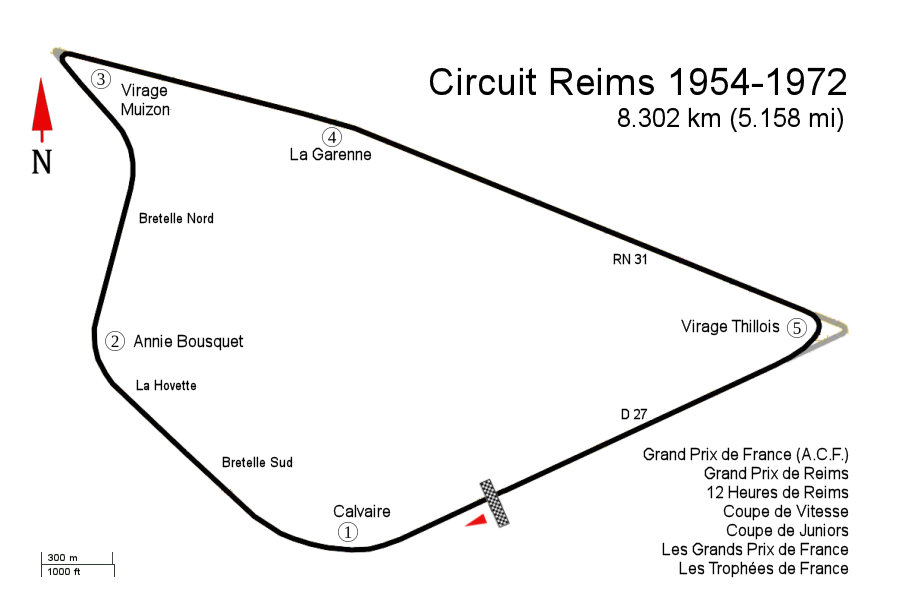
- Grand Prix Circuit (1954–1972)
- Location: Gueux, France
- Coordinates: 49°15′14.67″N 3°55′50.02″E
- Opened: 1926
- Closed: 1972
- Major events: Formula One; French Grand Prix (1950–1951, 1953–1954, 1956, 1958–1961, 1963, 1966); Grand Prix motorcycle racing French motorcycle Grand Prix (1954–1955); Grand Prix de la Marne (1925–1931, 1933–1937, 1952); 12 Hours of Reims (1926, 1953–1954, 1956–1958, 1964–1965, 1967)
- Website: https://www.passionnes-du-circuit-de-gueux.fr/

Grand Prix Circuit (1954–1972)
- Length: 8.302 km (5.159 mi)
- Turns: 7
- Race lap record: 2:10.500 ( (Australia) Paul Hawkins, Lola T70, 1967, Group 4)

Grand Prix Circuit (1953)
- Length: 8.372 km (5.202 mi)
- Turns: 7
- Race lap record: 2:41.000 ( (Argentina) Juan Manuel Fangio, Maserati A6GCM, 1953, F2 (Note: Despite the race was held as the Formula One race, Formula Two rules were used instead of Formula One rules in this race.))

Grand Prix Circuit (1952)
- Length: 7.152 km (4.444 mi)
- Turns: 5
- Race lap record: 2:28.200 ( (Italy) Alberto Ascari, Ferrari Tipo 500, 1952, F2)

Original Circuit (1926–1951)
- Length: 7.826 km (4.863 mi)
- Turns: 8
- Race lap record: 2:27.800 ( (Argentina) Juan Manuel Fangio, Alfa Romeo 159, 1951, F1)

Reims-Gueux was a motor racing circuit made up of rural public roads, located in Gueux, 8 km (5.0 mi) west of Reims in the Champagne region of north-eastern France, established in 1926 as the second venue of the Grand Prix de la Marne. The triangular layout of public roads formed three sectors between the villages of Thillois and Gueux over the La Garenne / Gueux intersection of Route nationale 31. The circuit became known to be among the fastest of the era for its two long straights (approximately 2.2 km; 1¼ miles in length each) allowing maximum straight-line speed, resulting in many famous slipstream battles.

== Circuit history ==
Motor racing at Reims started in 1926 with the second Grand Prix de la Marne, relocating the race from the square-shaped 22 km (14 mi) Circuit de Beine-Nauroy east of Reims to Reims-Gueux, west of Reims. The original 7.816 km (4.857 mi) circuit placed the start/finish line on road D27, approximately 1.6 km (0.99 mi) east of the Gueux village center, where it would remain for the duration of the circuit. This variant of the circuit was made up entirely of long straights, flat out kinks, 2 tight angular corners and a sharp hairpin, which made it very hard on engines, brakes and fuel consumption. Gradual improvements in track width to a few sections including the Garenne-Gueux / Thillois corners prior to the 1932 Grand Prix de France contributed to a new published circuit length of 7.826 km (4.863 mi) after which the circuit remained essentially the same until 1937.

Organizational changes prior to the 1938 GP de France saw extensive widening of the Thillois-Gueux straight. The process was reported to have felled trees and demolished structures to make the circuit yet faster, concluding the Grand Prix era with the 1938-1939 championship editions of the French Grand Prix.

Racing at Reims-Gueux resumed in 1947 with the 16th Grand Prix de Reims, effectively ending the Grand Prix de la Marne series except for a last edition in 1952. 1948 and 1949 saw the first Formula 1 cars at Reims-Gueux for two non-championship rounds. By then temporary grandstands were established fixtures at the Gueux / La Garenne and Thillois corners and after hosting the sixth round of the inaugural 1950 World Drivers' Championship, it became clear that the circuit needed further extensive renovations to comply with the accelerating Formula 1 technology.

For 1952, the track was re-configured to bypass Gueux via the (then) new D26 section, shortening the circuit from 7.826 km (4.863 mi) to 7.152 km (4.444 mi) after which it was renamed "Circuit de Reims" or commonly referred to simply as "Reims". Improvements continued in preparations for 1953, the inaugural year of the 12 Hours of Reims series, which featured a new D26 track extension from the Virage de la Hovette (Annie Bousquet corner) to a new purpose built intersection with the La Garenne straight (Muizon corner) about 1.2 km (0.75 mi) west of the previous Gueux / La Garenne junction, resulting in a new preliminary circuit length of 8.372 km (5.202 mi). The last major modifications were before the 1954 season, re-profiling the new Muizon corner from the previous year and the Thillois corner to a larger and faster radius, which established again a shorter and final circuit length of 8.302 km (5.159 mi). This public road circuit had previously been made up entirely of straights with a few slight and very fast kinks and slow corners; with the addition of these 3 fast sweepers and the extension of the main straight, this circuit, which was already very fast- was now even faster than it had been before, by about 4-5 mph per lap.

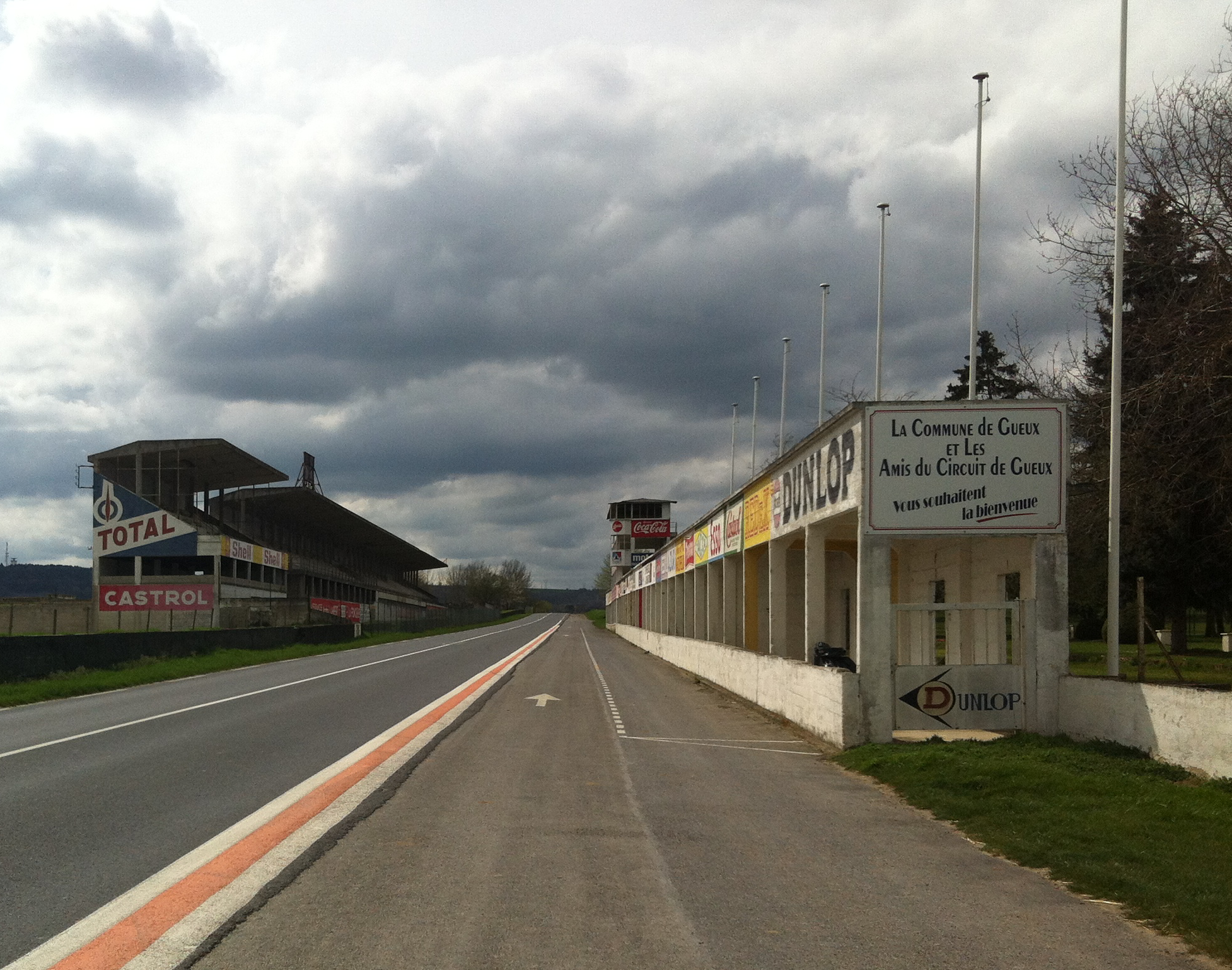
The pit boxes and stands of the former Reims-Gueux circuit pictured in 2016

The last year for Formula One at Reims came in 1966, final sports car competitions were held in 1969 and Motorcycle racing continued for another 3 years. In 1972, Reims-Gueux closed permanently due to financial difficulties. There was to be a historic race held in 1997 but it was cancelled for technical reasons several months before it was due to take place and by 2002, the bulldozers arrived to demolish some portions of the track. A few sections of the old circuit are still visible today around the pit lane, at the D26 / D27 round-about and a part of the D26 extension at the Hovette corner to what once was the 1953 Muizon hair-pin (visible on current sat. images).

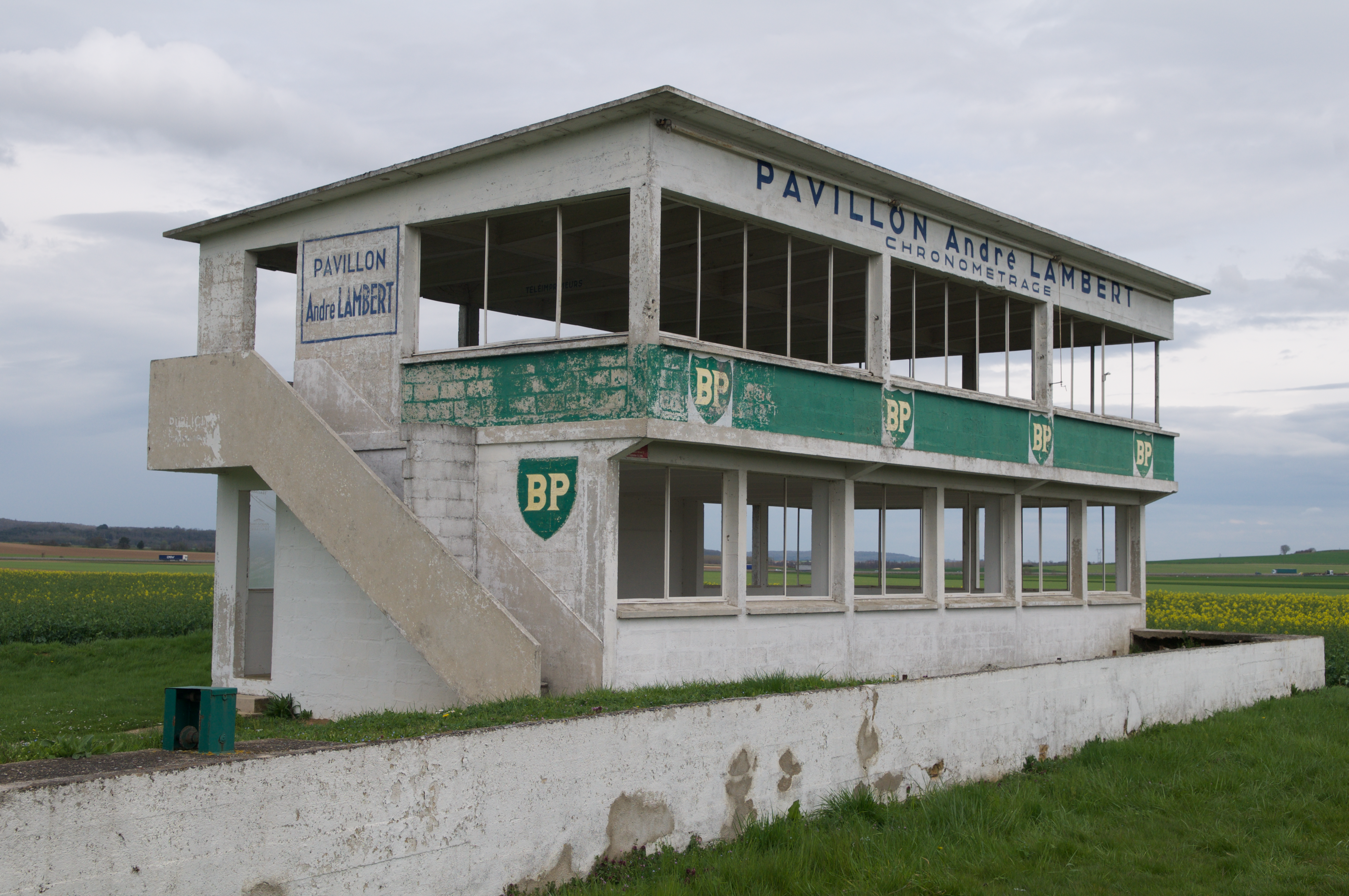
Timekeepers' building at the former Reims-Gueux circuit pictured in 2016

Today, the old RN31 straight between Muizon and Thillois is a wider dual carriageway, although it does follow the same line as the original two-lane road of the former circuit. It is still possible to drive a lap around the (more or less) original 1926 version (through the center of Gueux) and the 1952 variant of the circuit, except for the old Garenne -junction which was demolished as part of the RN31 modernization. It is no longer possible to complete a lap of the circuit used from 1953 onwards as the tarmac between Bretelle Nord and Muizon has been removed. Les Amis du Circuit de Gueux (a non-profit organization) is working to preserve the old pit building, grandstands and other remaining structures of the circuit and actively support historic meetings which use the 1952 Circuit d'Essais.

== Reims-Gueux Circuits by years ==
Circuit de Reims-Gueux layout history
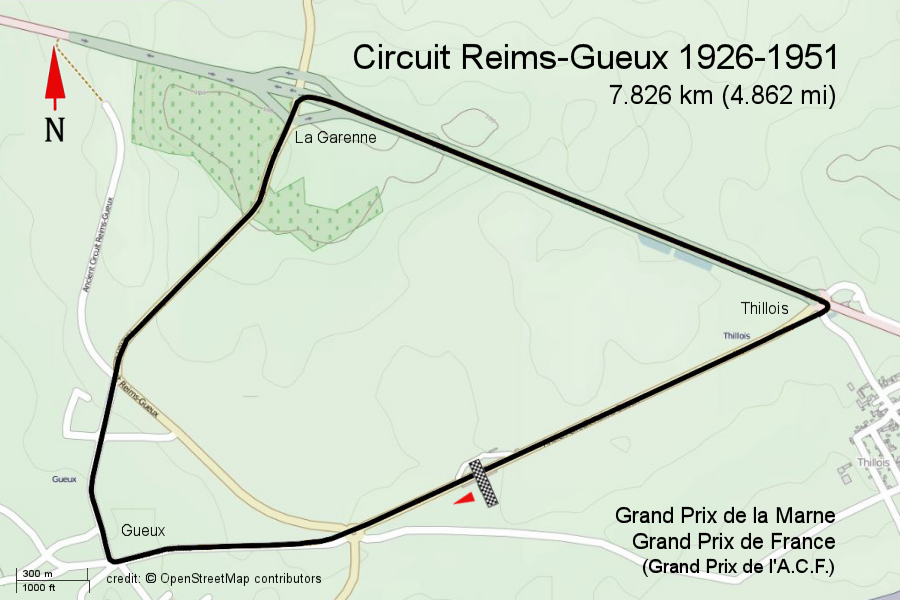
Original Circuit (1926–1951)

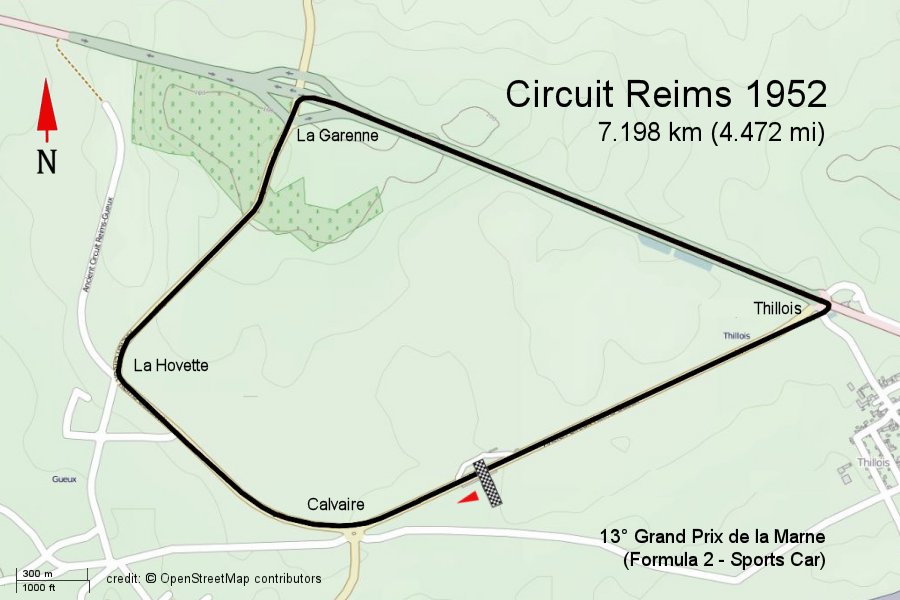
Grand Prix Circuit (1952)

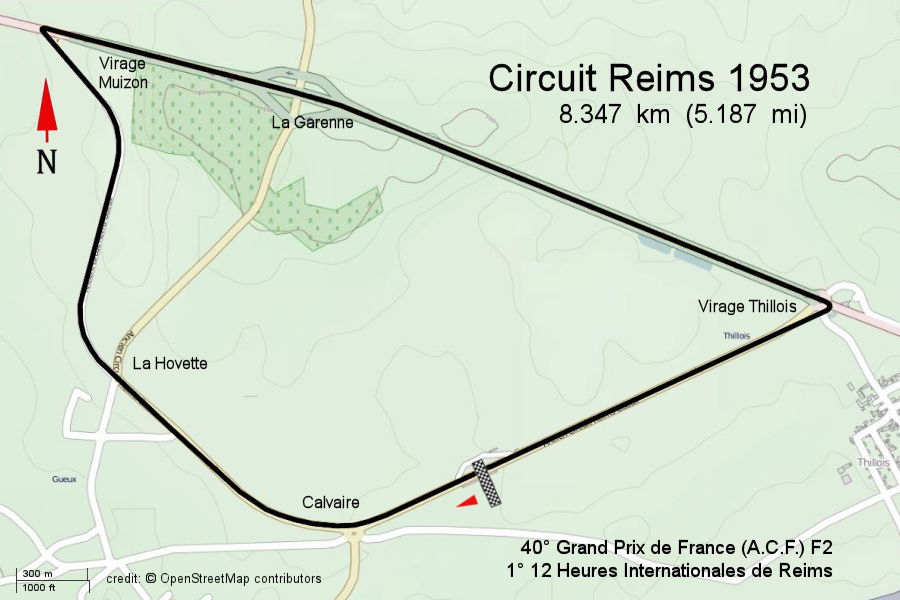
Grand Prix Circuit (1953)

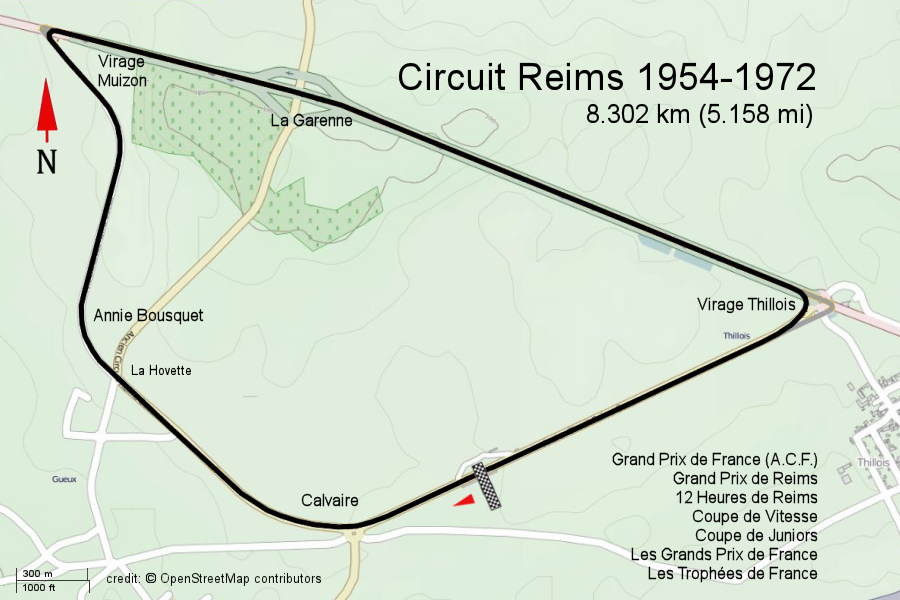
Grand Prix Circuit (1954–1972)

== Lap records ==
The fastest official race lap records at the Reims-Gueux are listed as:

| Category | Time | Driver | Vehicle | Event |
Grand Prix Circuit (1954–1972): 8.302 km (5.159 mi)
| Group 4 | 2:10.500 | Paul Hawkins | Lola T70 | 1967 12 Hours of Reims |
| Formula One | 2:11.300 | Lorenzo Bandini | Ferrari 312 | 1966 French Grand Prix |
| Formula Two | 2:12.600 | Piers Courage | Brabham BT30 | 1969 Reims Grand Prix |
| Sports prototype | 2:25.500 | Mike Parkes | Ferrari 250 P | 1963 Trophee P-GT-Sport |
| Formula Junior | 2:37.600 | Peter Arundell | Lotus 22 | 1962 Coupe de Juniors |
| Formula Three | 2:37.700 | Patrick Depailler | Alpine A330 | 1969 Reims French F3 round |
| 500cc | 2:39.000 | Geoff Duke | Gilera Saturno | 1955 French motorcycle Grand Prix |
| 250cc | 3:01.500 | Hermann Paul Müller | NSU Rennmax G.P. 250 | 1954 French motorcycle Grand Prix |
| 350cc | 3:02.000 | Duilio Agostini | Moto Guzzi 350 GP | 1955 French motorcycle Grand Prix |
| 125cc | 3:16.800 | Romolo Ferri | Mondial 125SS | 1955 French motorcycle Grand Prix |
Grand Prix Circuit (1953): 8.372 km (5.202 mi)
| Formula Two | 2:41.000 | Juan Manuel Fangio | Maserati A6GCM | 1953 French Grand Prix |
Grand Prix Circuit (1952): 7.152 km (4.444 mi)
| Formula Two | 2:28.200 | Alberto Ascari | Ferrari Tipo 500 | 1952 Marne Grand Prix |
| Sports prototype | 2:35.500 | Robert Manzon | Gordini T15S | 1952 Reims Grand Prix |
Grand Prix Circuit (1926–1951): 7.826 km (4.863 mi)
| Formula One | 2:27.800 | Juan Manuel Fangio | Alfa Romeo 159 | 1951 French Grand Prix |
| GP | 2:32.200 | Hermann Lang | Mercedes-Benz W154 | 1939 French Grand Prix |
| Formula Two | 2:53.600 | Alberto Ascari | Ferrari 166 F2 | 1950 Coupe des Petites Cylindrees |
| Sports prototype | 3:07.400 | René Carrière | Delahaye 145 | 1937 Marne Grand Prix |

== Racing series at Reims-Gueux ==
| Race Names Grand Prix de la Marne; Coupe d’Or (1° 12 Heures de Reims); Grand Prix de France (GP de l'ACF); Grand Prix de la Marne de Tourisme; Coupe de la Commission Sportive de l'ACF; Grand Prix de Reims; Coupe des Petites Cylindrées; Coupe des Racers 500; European Grand Prix (honorary) (E); 12 Heures Internationales de Reims; Coupe Internationale de Vitesse; Coupe de Juniors; Trophée International Prototypes Grand Tourisme et Sport; Les Grands Prix France; Les Trophées de France | Editions 13; 1; 16; 1; 1; 3; 4; 1; 3; 8; 9; 4; 1; 3; 3 | First Year 1926; 1926; 1932; 1935; 1939; 1947; 1947; 1950; 1951; 1953; 1957; 1960; 1963; 1964; 1967 | Last Year 1952 - 1966 - - 1962; 1950 - 1966; 1967; 1969; 1963 - 1966; 1969 | Regulations FL - GP - VT - SC; FL - SC; GP - F1 - F2; SC; VT; GP - F1; F2; F3; F1; SC; F2 - F3; FJ; SC; F2; F2 |

=== Reims-Gueux by year ===
Legend

Formula Libre = FL - Grand Prix = GP - Voiturette = VT - Formula 1 = F1 - Formula 2 = F2
Formula 3 = F3 - Formula Junior = FJ - Sports car = SC
Coupe des P. C. = Petites Cylindrées, Trophée P-GT-Sport = Prototypes - Grand Tourisme

French Grand Prix - GP championship rounds
French Grand Prix - F1 non-championship rounds
French Grand Prix - F1 championship rounds

| Year | Date | Event | Reg. | Winner | Constructor / Car | Circuit | Laps | Time | km/h av. | Report |
|---|---|---|---|---|---|---|---|---|---|---|
| 1925 | Aug. 2 | (Champagne-Ardenne) 1° GP de la Marne | FL | (France) Pierre Clause | Bignan | 22.000 km (13.670 mi) | 10 | 2:08:56.4 | 104.20 km/h (64.75 mph) | Report |
| 1926 | July 25 | (Champagne-Ardenne) 2° GP de la Marne | FL | (France) François Lescot | Bugatti T35B 2L C | 7.816 km (4.857 mi) | 40 | 2:50:15.6 | 112.77 km/h (70.07 mph) | Report |
| 1927 | July 10 | (Champagne-Ardenne) 3° GP de la Marne | FL | (France) Philippe Étancelin | Bugatti T35B | 7.816 km (4.857 mi) | 50 | 3:26:20.2 | 116.32 km/h (72.28 mph) | Report |
| 1928 | July 8 | (Champagne-Ardenne) 4° GP de la Marne | GP | (Monaco) Louis Chiron | Bugatti T35 | 7.816 km (4.857 mi) | 50 | 3:00:47.4 | 132.75 km/h (82.49 mph) | Report |
| 1929 | July 7 | (Champagne-Ardenne) 5° GP de la Marne | GP | (France) Philippe Étancelin | Bugatti 35C | 7.816 km (4.857 mi) | 50 | 2:54:14.6 | 137.74 km/h (85.59 mph) | Report |
| 1930 | June 29 | (Champagne-Ardenne) 6° GP de la Marne | GP | (France) René Dreyfus | Bugatti T35B | 7.816 km (4.857 mi) | 50 | 2:49:27.6 | 141.626 km/h (88.002 mph) | Report |
| 1931 | July 5 | (Champagne-Ardenne) 7° GP de la Marne | GP | (France) Marcel Lehoux | Bugatti T51 | 7.816 km (4.857 mi) | 50 | 2:47:37.4 | 143.18 km/h (88.97 mph) | Report |
| 1931 | July 5 | (Champagne-Ardenne) 7° GP de la Marne | VT | (France) Philippe Auber | Bugatti T37A | 7.816 km (4.857 mi) | 50 | 3:19:00.4 | 120.588 km/h (74.930 mph) | Report |
| 1932 | July 3 | (France) 18° GP de l'ACF | GP | (Italy) Tazio Nuvolari | Alfa Romeo Tipo B | 7.826 km (4.863 mi) | 92 | 2:57:52.8 | 145.3 km/h (90.3 mph) | Report |
| 1933 | July 2 | (Champagne-Ardenne) 8° GP de la Marne | GP | (France) Philippe Etancelin | Alfa Romeo Monza | 7.826 km (4.863 mi) | 51 | 2:45:12.4 | 145.0 km/h (90.1 mph) | Report |
| 1934 | July 8 | (Champagne-Ardenne) 9° GP de la Marne | GP | (Monaco) Louis Chiron | Alfa Romeo Tipo B | 7.826 km (4.863 mi) | 64 | 3:25:51.8 | 146.0 km/h (90.7 mph) | Report |
| 1935 | July 7 | (Champagne-Ardenne) 10° GP de la Marne | GP | (France) René Dreyfus | Alfa Romeo Tipo B | 7.826 km (4.863 mi) | 64 | 2:57:52.8 | 157.760 km/h (98.028 mph) | Report |
| 1935 | July 7 | (Champagne-Ardenne) 1° GP de Tourisme | SC | (France) Albert Perrot | Delahaye 135 S | 7.826 km (4.863 mi) | 25 | 1:29:22.7 | 131.34 km/h (81.61 mph) | Report |
| 1936 | July 5 | (Champagne-Ardenne) 11° GP de la Marne | SC | (France) Jean-Pierre Wimille | Bugatti 57G Tank | 7.826 km (4.863 mi) | 51 | 2:50:45.3 | 140.245 km/h (87.144 mph) | Report |
| 1937 | July 18 | (Champagne-Ardenne) 12° GP de la Marne | SC | (France) Jean-Pierre Wimille | Bugatti T59 | 7.826 km (4.863 mi) | 63 | 3:23:58.4 | 145.030 km/h (90.117 mph) | Report |
| 1938 | July 2 | (France) 32° GP de l’ACF | GP | (Germany) Manfred von Brauchitsch | Mercedes W154 | 7.816 km (4.857 mi) | 64 | 2:57:52.8 | 168.707 km/h (104.830 mph) | Report |
| 1939 | July 9 | (France) 33° GP de l’ACF | GP | (Germany) Hermann Paul Müller | Auto Union D | 7.816 km (4.857 mi) | 64 | 2:57:52.8 | 168.707 km/h (104.830 mph) | Report |
| 1939 | July 9 | (France) Coupe Sportive | VT | (Switzerland) Armand Hug | Maserati 4CM | 7.816 km (4.857 mi) | 38 | 1:58:21.6 | 150.6 km/h (93.6 mph) | Report |
1940–1946 (No racing events held)
| 1947 | July 6 | 16° GP de Reims | GP | (Switzerland) Christian Kautz | Maserati 4CL | 7.816 km (4.857 mi) | 51 | 2:34:50.7 | 155.181 km/h (96.425 mph) | Report |
| 1947 | July 6 | 1° Coupe des P.C. | F2 | (Thailand) B. Bira | Simca-Gordini 11 | 7.816 km (4.857 mi) | 26 | 1:29:20.4 | 136.473 km/h (84.800 mph) | Report |
| 1948 | July 18 | (France) 35° GP de l’ACF | F1 | (France) Jean-Pierre Wimille | Alfa Romeo 158 | 7.816 km (4.857 mi) | 64 | 3:01:07.5 | 165.699 km/h (102.961 mph) | Report |
| 1948 | July 18 | 2° Coupe des P.C. | F2 | (France) Raymond Sommer | Ferrari 166 SC | 7.816 km (4.857 mi) | 26 | 1:18:48.0 | 154.714 km/h (96.135 mph) | Report |
| 1949 | July 6 | 6° GP de France | F1 | (Monaco) Louis Chiron | Talbot-Lago | 7.816 km (4.857 mi) | 64 | 3:06:33.7 | 160.870 km/h (99.960 mph) | Report |
| 1949 | July 6 | 3° Coupe des P.C. | F2 | (Italy) Alberto Ascari | Ferrari 166 2L | 7.816 km (4.857 mi) | 26 | 1:19:56.9 | 152.722 km/h (94.897 mph) | Report |
| 1950 | July 6 | (France) 37° GP de l’ACF | F1 | (Argentina) Juan Manuel Fangio | Alfa Romeo 158 | 7.816 km (4.857 mi) | 64 | 2:57:52.8 | 168.722 km/h (104.839 mph) | Report |
| 1950 | July 6 | 4° Coupe des P.C. | F2 | (Italy) Alberto Ascari | Ferrari 166 2L | 7.816 km (4.857 mi) | 26 | 1:16:42.7 | 159.939 km/h (99.381 mph) | Report |
| 1950 | July 6 | Coupe des Racers 500 | F3 | (United Kingdom) Alfred Bottoms | Cowlan-JBS / Norton | 7.816 km (4.857 mi) | 13 | 46:16.9 | 131.720 km/h (81.847 mph) | Report |
| 1951 | July 1 | (France) 38° GP de l’ACF (E) | F1 | (Italy) Luigi Fagioli (Argentina) Juan Manuel Fangio | Alfa Romeo 159 | 7.816 km (4.857 mi) | 77 | 3:22:11.0 | 178.600 km/h (110.977 mph) | Report |
| 1952 | June 29 | (Champagne-Ardenne) 13° GP de la Marne | F2 | (France) Jean Behra | Gordini T16 | 7.152 km (4.444 mi) | 71 | 3 hrs | 169.935 km/h (105.593 mph) | Report |
| 1953 | July 5 | (France) 40° GP de l’ACF | F2 | (United Kingdom) Mike Hawthorn | Ferrari 500 2L | 8.347 km (5.187 mi) | 60 | 2:44:18.6 | 182.881 km/h (113.637 mph) | Report |
| 1954 | July 4 | (France) 41° GP de l’ACF | F1 | (Argentina) Juan Manuel Fangio | Mercedes W196 | 8.302 km (5.159 mi) | 61 | 2:42:47.9 | 186.644 km/h (115.975 mph) | Report |
1955 (No racing events held)
| 1956 | July 1 | (France) 42° GP de l’ACF | F1 | (United Kingdom) Peter Collins | Lancia-Ferrari D50 | 8.302 km (5.159 mi) | 61 | 2:34:23.4 | 196.809 km/h (122.291 mph) | Report |
| 1957 | July 14 | 2° GP de Reims | F1 | (Italy) Luigi Musso | Lancia-Ferrari D50 | 8.302 km (5.159 mi) | 61 | 2:33:02.6 | 198.610 km/h (123.411 mph) | Report |
| 1957 | July 14 | (France) 1° Coupe de Vitesse | F2 | (France) Maurice Trintignant | Ferrari D156 F2 | 8.302 km (5.159 mi) | 37 | 1:40:06.8 | 184.090 km/h (114.388 mph) | Report |
| 1958 | July 6 | (France) 44° GP de l’ACF | F1 | (United Kingdom) Mike Hawthorn | Ferrari 246 | 8.302 km (5.159 mi) | 50 | 2:03:21.3 | 201.905 km/h (125.458 mph) | Report |
| 1958 | July 6 | (France) 2° Coupe de Vitesse | F2 | (France) Jean Behra | Porsche 718 F2 | 8.302 km (5.159 mi) | 30 | 1:19:45.0 | 187.374 km/h (116.429 mph) | Report |
| 1959 | July 5 | (France) 45° GP de l’ACF (E) | F1 | (United Kingdom) Tony Brooks | Ferrari 246 | 8.302 km (5.159 mi) | 50 | 2:01:26.5 | 205.086 km/h (127.435 mph) | Report |
| 1959 | July 5 | (France) 3° Coupe de Vitesse | F2 | (United Kingdom) Stirling Moss | Cooper T45 | 8.302 km (5.159 mi) | 25 | 1:04:54.2 | 191.864 km/h (119.219 mph) | Report |
| 1960 | July 3 | (France) 46° GP de l’ACF | F1 | (Australia) Jack Brabham | Cooper-Climax | 8.302 km (5.159 mi) | 50 | 1:57:24.9 | 212.119 km/h (131.805 mph) | Report |
| 1960 | July 3 | (France) 1° Coupe de Juniors | FJ | (United Kingdom) Mike McKee | Lotus 18 Cosworth | 8.302 km (5.159 mi) | 20 | 58:45.4 | 169.548 km/h (105.352 mph) | Report |
| 1961 | July 2 | (France) 47° GP de l’ACF | F1 | (Italy) Giancarlo Baghetti | Ferrari 156 | 8.302 km (5.159 mi) | 52 | 2:14:17.5 | 192.880 km/h (119.850 mph) | Report |
| 1961 | July 2 | (France) 2° Coupe de Juniors | FJ | (United Kingdom) Trevor Taylor | Lotus 20 Cosworth | 8.302 km (5.159 mi) | 30 | 1:24:44.1 | 176.352 km/h (109.580 mph) | Report |
| 1962 | July 1 | 3° GP de Reims | F1 | (New Zealand) Bruce McLaren | Cooper Climax T60 | 8.302 km (5.159 mi) | 50 | 2:02:32.2 | 203.31 km/h (126.33 mph) | Report |
| 1962 | July 1 | (France) 3° Coupe de Juniors | FJ | (United Kingdom) Mike Spence | Lotus 22 Cosworth | 8.302 km (5.159 mi) | 10 | 27:03.1 | 184.130 km/h (114.413 mph) | Report |
| 1963 | June 30 | (France) 49° GP de l’ACF | F1 | (Scotland) Jim Clark | Lotus-Climax | 8.302 km (5.159 mi) | 53 | 2:10:54.3 | 201.676 km/h (125.316 mph) | Report |
| 1963 | June 30 | (France) Trophee P-GT-Sport | SC | (Italy) Carlo Mario Abate | Ferrari TRI/61 | 8.302 km (5.159 mi) | 25 | 01:02:59.5 | 197.686 km/h (122.836 mph) | Report |
| 1963 | June 30 | (France) 4° Coupe de Juniors | FJ | (New Zealand) Denis Hulme | Brabham BT6 Cosworth | 8.302 km (5.159 mi) | 20 | 54:27.0 | 182.958 km/h (113.685 mph) | Report |
| 1964 | July 5 | Grands Prix France | F2 | (United Kingdom) Alan Rees | Brabham Cosworth | 8.302 km (5.159 mi) | 37 | 01:36:10.6 | 191.625 km/h (119.070 mph) | Report |
| 1964 | July 5 | (France) 4° Coupe de Vitesse | F3 | (Scotland) Jackie Stewart | Cooper BMC | 8.302 km (5.159 mi) | 20 | 57:15.8 | 173.969 km/h (108.099 mph) | Report |
| 1965 | July 4 | Grands Prix France | F2 | (Austria) Jochen Rindt | Brabham Cosworth | 8.302 km (5.159 mi) | 37 | 01:33:55.7 | 196.212 km/h (121.920 mph) | Report |
| 1965 | July 4 | (France) 5° Coupe de Vitesse | F3 | (France) Jean-Pierre Beltoise | Matra - Cosworth | 8.302 km (5.159 mi) | 20 | 54:33.8 | 182.578 km/h (113.449 mph) | Report |
| 1966 | July 2 | Grands Prix France | F2 | (Australia) Jack Brabham | Brabham Honda | 8.302 km (5.159 mi) | 37 | 01:33:32.4 | 197.026 km/h (122.426 mph) | Report |
| 1966 | July 3 | (France) 52° GP de l’ACF (E) | F1 | (Australia) Jack Brabham | Brabham BT19 | 8.302 km (5.159 mi) | 48 | 01:48:31.3 | 220.315 km/h (136.897 mph) | Report |
| 1966 | July 3 | (France) 6° Coupe de Vitesse | F3 | (United Kingdom) John Fenning | Matra - Cosworth | 8.302 km (5.159 mi) | 20 | 55:16.3 | 180.238 km/h (111.995 mph) | Report |
| 1967 | June 25 | Les Trophées de France | F2 | (Austria) Jochen Rindt | Brabham BT23 | 8.302 km (5.159 mi) | 37 | 01:25:25.4 | 215.747 km/h (134.059 mph) | Report |
| 1967 | June 25 | (France) 7° Coupe de Vitesse | F3 | (France) Jean-Pierre Jabouille | Matra - Cosworth | 8.302 km (5.159 mi) | 20 | 54:39.8 | 182.243 km/h (113.241 mph) | Report |
| 1968 | June 25 | Les Trophées de France | F2 | (Scotland) Jackie Stewart | Matra MS7 Cosworth | 8.302 km (5.159 mi) | 35 | 01:25:23.1 | 207.869 km/h (129.164 mph) | Report |
| 1968 | June 25 | (France) 8° Coupe de Vitesse | F3 | (United Kingdom) Peter Westbury | Brabham BT21 | 8.302 km (5.159 mi) | 15 | 41:29.3 | 180.088 km/h (111.901 mph) | Report |
| 1969 | June 25 | Les Trophées de France | F2 | (France) François Cevert | Tecno Ford TF | 8.302 km (5.159 mi) | 35 | 01:19:21.3 | 219.692 km/h (136.510 mph) | Report |
| 1969 | June 25 | (France) 9° Coupe de Vitesse | F3 | (United States) Peter de Merrit | Tecno Toyota | 8.302 km (5.159 mi) | 15 | 53:39.3 | 185.669 km/h (115.369 mph) | Report |

=== Sports car racing at Reims-Gueux by year (condensed) ===
| Year | Date | Event | Drivers | Team | Constructor / Car | Group | Laps | Distance | km/h | Report |
|---|---|---|---|---|---|---|---|---|---|---|
| 1926 | Aug. 27 | Coupe d'Or | (France) Roger Gauthier | (Private) | (France) Bignan 2LC | N/A | 53 | 1,056 km (656 mi) | N/A | Report |
| 1935 | July 7 | 1° GP de Tourisme | (France) Albert Perrot | (Private) | (France) Delahaye 18 CV | +3.0 | 25 | 195.672 km (121.585 mi) | 131.34 km/h (81.61 mph) | Report |
| 1936 | July 5 | 11° GP de la Marne | (France) Jean-Pierre Wimille | (France) Bugatti (Works) | (France) Bugatti 57G Tank | S5.0 | 51 | 399.126 km (248.005 mi) | 140.245 km/h (87.144 mph) | Report |
| 1937 | July 18 | 12° GP de la Marne | (France) Jean-Pierre Wimille | (France) Bugatti (Works) | (France) Bugatti T59 | S5.0 | 63 | 500.0 km (310.7 mi) | 140.245 km/h (87.144 mph) | Report |
| 1952 | June 29 | 13° GP de la Marne | (United Kingdom) Stirling Moss | (United Kingdom) T. H. Wisdom | (United Kingdom) Jaguar C-Type | S+2.0 | 50 | 359.88 km (223.62 mi) | 158.017 km/h (98.187 mph) | Report |
| 1953–1954 | | 12 Heures Internationales de Reims | | | | | | | | |
1955 Cancelled
| 1956–1958 | | 12 Heures Internationales de Reims | | | | | | | | |
1959–1963 Not held
| 1963 | June 30 | Trophee P-GT-Sport | (United Kingdom) Dick Protheroe | (United Kingdom) Protheroe | (United Kingdom) Jaguar E 3L+ | P+3.0 | 25 | 207.550 km (128.966 mi) | 193.910 km/h (120.490 mph) | Report |
| 1964–1965 | | 12 Heures Internationales de Reims - Sportscar World Championship | | | | | | | | |
| 1966 | July 3 | Coupe Nationale R8 Gordini | (France) Jean- Claude Andruet | (France) Gordini | (France) R8 Gordini | S1.2 | 12 | 99.624 km (61.903 mi) | 145.748 km/h (90.564 mph) | Report |
| 1967 | | 12 Heures Internationales de Reims | | | | | | | | |
| 1967 | June 25 | Coupe Nationale R8 Gordini | (France) Francis Stalter | (France) Gordini | (France) R8 Gordini | S1.2 | 15 | 124.530 km (77.379 mi) | 149.401 km/h (92.833 mph) | Report |
| 1968 | June 24 | Coupe Nationale R8 Gordini | (France) Bernard Lagier | (France) Gordini | (France) R8 Gordini | S1.2 | 12 | 99.624 km (61.903 mi) | 154.851 km/h (96.220 mph) | Report |
| 1969 | June 24 | Coupe Nationale R8 Gordini | (France) Alain Cudini | (France) Gordini | (France) R8 Gordini | S1.2 | 12 | 99.624 km (61.903 mi) | 155.759 km/h (96.784 mph) | Report |

== See also ==
- Grand Prix de la Marne
- 12 Hours of Reims
