= 1947 Reims Grand Prix =

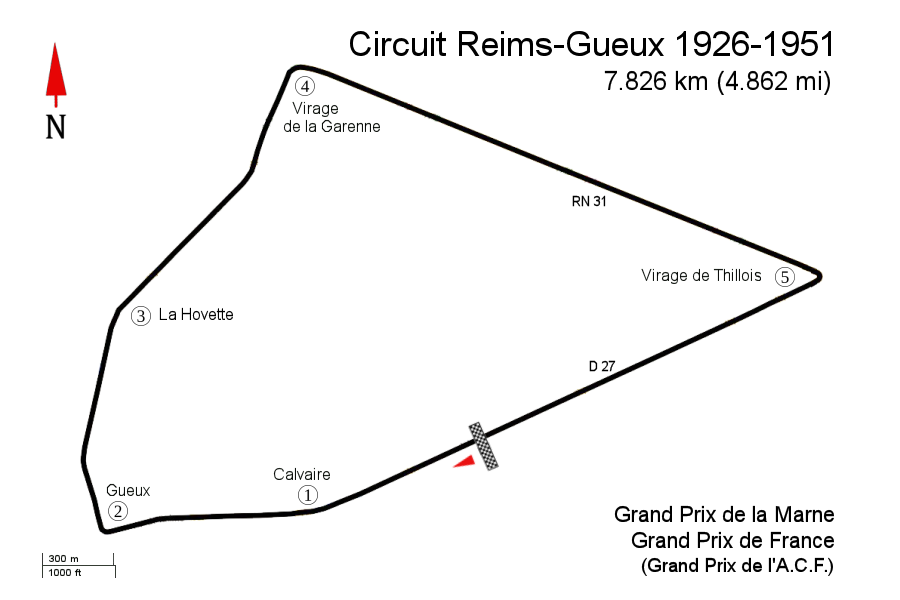

Race details
- Date: 6 July 1947
- Official name: I Grand Prix de Reims
- Location: Reims-Gueux, Reims
- Course: Permanent racing facility
- Course length: 7.816 km (4.856 miles)
- Distance: 51 laps, 398.616 km (247.688 miles)

Pole position
Driver	(Switzerland) Christian Kautz	Maserati
- Time: 2:51.1

Fastest lap
Driver	(Italy) Luigi Villoresi	Maserati
- Time: 2:58.2

Podium
First	(Switzerland) Christian Kautz	Maserati
Second	(Monaco) Louis Chiron	Talbot-Lago
Third	(United Kingdom) Bob Gerard (United Kingdom) Cuth Harrison	ERA

The XVI Grand Prix de Reims, also known as the I Grand Prix de Reims, was a Formula One motor race held on 6 July 1947, at the Reims-Gueux circuit near Reims in north-eastern France. The race was run over 51 laps on a 7.816 km circuit of public roads and was won by Swiss driver Christian Kautz in a Maserati 4CL.

== History ==
The 1947 Grand Prix at Reims (commonly known as the Reims Grand Prix) was the first major Grand Prix motor race held at Reims-Gueux after WW2. Officially billed as the XVI Grand Prix de Reims, the race number has its origin in the Grand Prix de la Marne, a pre-war Grand Prix racing series (1925-1937, plus one commemorative race held in 1952).

Post war political and financial re-organization moved the nationally sanctioned Grand Prix de France (Grand Prix de l'ACF) to the circuit Rouen-Les-Essarts after three editions were held at Reims in 1932, 1938 and 1939. Among those changes was renaming the old pre-war Marne GP to Grand Prix de Reims, officially billed as the XVI Grand Prix de Reims, based on the former Grand Prix de la Marne numbering sequence. Conflicts between local, regional, national and commercial interests, further complicated by the new post-war Formula 1 and Formula 2 series, led to various accounts of race name and numbering formats. As a result, some sources list the 1957 and 1962 Grand Prix de Reims as the 2nd (II) and 3rd (III) GP de Reims respectively.

== Results ==
Pos	No.	Driver	Entrant	Constructor	Time/Retired	Grid
1	40	(Switzerland) Christian Kautz	Scuderia Enrico Platé	Maserati 4CL	2:34:50.7	1
2	20	(Monaco) Louis Chiron	Ecurie France	Talbot-Lago 39	+2:38.9	18
3	32	(United Kingdom) Bob Gerard (United Kingdom) Cuth Harrison	Bob Gerard	ERA B-Type	+3 laps	5
4	48	(France) Eugène Chaboud	Ecurie France	Delahaye 135	+3 laps	8
5	24	(France) Edmond Mouche (France) José Scaron	Edmond Mouche	Talbot-Lago T150C	+4 laps	10
6	26	(France) Louis Rosier	Louis Rosier	Talbot-Lago T26SS	+5 laps	7
7	46	(France) Charles Pozzi	Ecurie France	Delahaye 135S	+5 laps	9
Ret	38	(France) Maurice Trintignant (France) Henri Louveau	Ecurie Gersac	Delage D6-70	45 laps - valves	6
Ret	12	(France) Raymond Sommer	Raymond Sommer	Maserati 4CM	38 laps - transmission	3
Ret	16	(United Kingdom) Fred Ashmore (United Kingdom) Leslie Brooke	E.R.A. Ltd.	ERA B-Type	33 laps - connecting rod	17
Ret	8	(Italy) Luigi Villoresi	Scuderia Ambrosiana	Maserati 4CL	32 laps - engine	15
Ret	10	(Italy) Alberto Ascari	Scuderia Ambrosiana	Maserati 4CLT	26 laps - engine	16
Ret	44	(France) Yves Giraud-Cabantous	Ecurie France	Delahaye 135	22 laps - valves	4
Ret	4	(France) 'Raph'	Ecurie Naphtra Course	Maserati 4CL	19 laps - oil piping	13
Ret	30	(United Kingdom) Peter Whitehead	Peter Whitehead	ERA B-Type	11 laps - piston	11
Ret	34	(United Kingdom) Reg Parnell	Reg Parnell	ERA E Type	7 laps -supercharger	20
Ret	28	(United Kingdom) Leslie Brooke	E.R.A. Ltd.	ERA E-Type	5 laps - oil Pressure	19
Ret	6	(United Kingdom) Kenneth Evans	Connell / Evans	Maserati 6C-1500	4 laps - engine	14
Ret	2	(Switzerland) Enrico Platé	Scuderia Enrico Platé	Maserati 4CL	1 lap - crash	12
DSQ	14	(France) Henri Louveau	Scuderia Enrico Platé	Maserati 4CM	25 laps - outside assistance	2
DNA	18	(France) Jean-Pierre Wimille	Ecurie Naphtra Course	Maserati 4CL	-	-
DNA	22	(United States) Luigi Chinetti	Ecurie France	Talbot MD	-	-
DNA	36	(France) Jean Achard	Ecurie Gersac	Delage D6-70	-	-
DNA	42	(France) Philippe Étancelin	Ecurie Gersac	Delage D6-70	-	-
DNA	44	(France) Maurice Varet	Ecurie France	Delahaye 135CS	-	-

Grand Prix Race
1947 Grand Prix season
Previous race: —	Reims Grand Prix	Next race: 1957 Reims Grand Prix
