= 1957 Reims Grand Prix =

- Non-championship race in the 1957 Formula One season
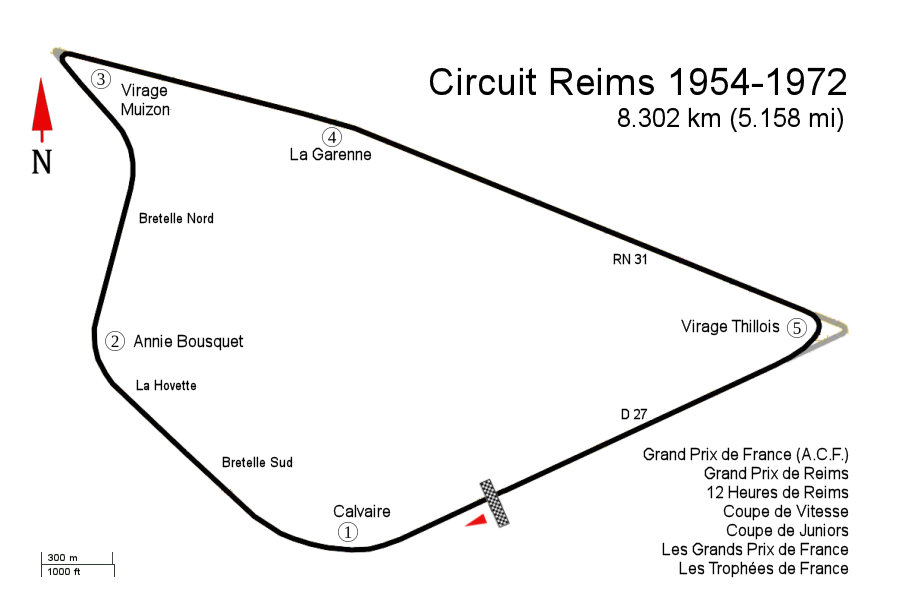

Race details
- Date: July 14, 1957
- Official name: XXIII Grand Prix de Reims
- Location: Reims-Gueux, Reims
- Course: Permanent racing facility
- Course length: 8.302 km (5.158 miles)
- Distance: 61 laps, 506.422 km (314.676 miles)

Pole position
Driver	(Argentina) Juan Manuel Fangio	(Italy) Maserati 250F
- Time: 2:23.3

Fastest lap
Driver	(France) Jean Behra	(Italy) Maserati 250F
- Time: 2:27.8

Podium
First	(Italy) Luigi Musso	(Italy) Lancia-Ferrari
Second	(France) Jean Behra	(Italy) Maserati 250F
Third	(United Kingdom) Stuart Lewis-Evans	(United Kingdom) Vanwall

The XXIII (23rd) Reims Grand Prix (also known as the II Grand Prix de Reims), was a non-championship Formula One motor race, held on July 14, 1957, at the Reims-Gueux circuit, near Reims in France. The race was run over 61 laps on an 8.302 km circuit of public roads and was won by Italian driver Luigi Musso in a Lancia-Ferrari D50. The race weekend suffered the deaths of Bill Whitehouse and Herbert MacKay-Fraser in separate accidents during the 1st Coupe de Vitesse Formula 2 support race.

The Grand Prix de Reims (commonly known as the Reims Grand Prix) has its roots in the pre WW2 Grand Prix de la Marne GP racing series, also known as the Marne Grand Prix (1925-1937). The first "Grand Prix de Reims" (official name: XVI Grand Prix de Reims) was the first major Grand Prix motor race held at Reims-Gueux after WW2. Post war political and financial re-organization moved the nationally sanctioned Grand Prix de France (Grand Prix de l'ACF) to the circuit Rouen les Essarts and renamed the old Marne GP to Grand Prix de Reims, officially billed as the XVI Grand Prix de Reims (based on the GP de Marne year sequence).

== Results ==
Pos	No.	Driver	Entrant	Constructor /Car	Time/Retired	Grid
1	2	(Italy) Luigi Musso	Scuderia Ferrari	Lancia-Ferrari D50	2:33:02.6	4
2	12	(France) Jean Behra	Officine Alfieri Maserati	Maserati 250F	2:33:30.1	3
3	26	(United Kingdom) Stuart Lewis-Evans	Vandervell	Vanwall	2:34:18.6	2
4	14	(United States) Harry Schell	Officine Alfieri Maserati	Maserati 250F	60 Laps	10
5	24	(United Kingdom) Roy Salvadori	Vandervell	Vanwall	59 Laps	5
6	40	(United Kingdom) Horace Gould	Gould's Garage (Bristol) (Private)	Maserati 250F	58 Laps	12
7	18	(United States) Masten Gregory	Scuderia Centro Sud	Maserati 250F	57 Laps	11
8	10	(Argentina) Juan Manuel Fangio	Officine Alfieri Maserati	Maserati 250F	65 Laps	1
9	22	(Italy) Luigi Piotti	Piotti (Private)	Maserati 250F	56 Laps	14
10	20	(United Kingdom) Ivor Bueb	Scuderia Centro Sud	Maserati 250F	55 Laps	18
NC	34	(United Kingdom) Bruce Halford	Halford (Private)	Maserati 250F	53 Laps	15
NC	38	(Australia) Jack Brabham	Cooper Car Company	Cooper-Climax T43	52 Laps	19
DNF	32	(Argentina) Carlos Menditeguy	Officine Alfieri Maserati	Maserati 250F	28 Laps - Gearbox	16
DNF	6	(United Kingdom) Mike Hawthorn	Scuderia Ferrari	Lancia-Ferrari D50	26 Laps - Engine	7
DNF	8	(Belgium) Olivier Gendebien	Scuderia Ferrari	Lancia-Ferrari D50	25 Laps - Engine	8
DNF	16	(Spain) Francisco Godia Sales	Godia (Private)	Maserati 250F	15 Laps - Oil pipe	13
DNF	36	(Sweden) Jo Bonnier	Bonnier (Private)	Maserati 250F	13 Laps - Mechanical	17
DNF	4	(United Kingdom) Peter Collins	Scuderia Ferrari	Lancia-Ferrari D50	2 Laps - Engine	6
DNS	42	(United States) Herbert MacKay-Fraser	Ottorino Volonterio	Maserati 250F	Fatal crash (F2)	9
DNA	18	(United Kingdom) Ron Flockhart	Owen Racing Organisation	BRM P25	Entry withdrawn	-
DNA	30	(United States) Herbert MacKay-Fraser	Owen Racing Organisation	BRM P25	Entry withdrawn	-
DNA	24	(United Kingdom) Stirling Moss	Vandervell	Vanwall	-	-
DNA	26	(United Kingdom) Tony Brooks	Vandervell	Vanwall	-	-
DNA	32	(Italy) Umberto Maglioli	Officine Alfieri Maserati	Maserati 250F	-	-
DNA	40	(France) André Simon	Simon	Maserati 250F	-	-
DNA	42	(Italy) Ottorino Volonterio	Ottorino Volonterio	Maserati 250F	-	-

Previous race: 1957 Naples Grand Prix	Formula One non-championship races 1957 season	Next race: 1957 Caen Grand Prix
Previous race: 1947 Reims Grand Prix	Reims Grand Prix	Next race: 1962 Reims Grand Prix
