= A330 (disambiguation) =

The Airbus A330 is a long-range wide-body airliner.

A330 may also refer to:

- A330 road (Great Britain), a road in Zone 3 of the Great Britain numbering scheme
- Aero A.330, a Czechoslovak biplane
- Alpine A330, an open-wheel Formula 3 race car
- Sony α330, a camera
- Van Hool A330, a transit bus
