= 12 Hours of Reims =

(France) 12 Hours of Reims
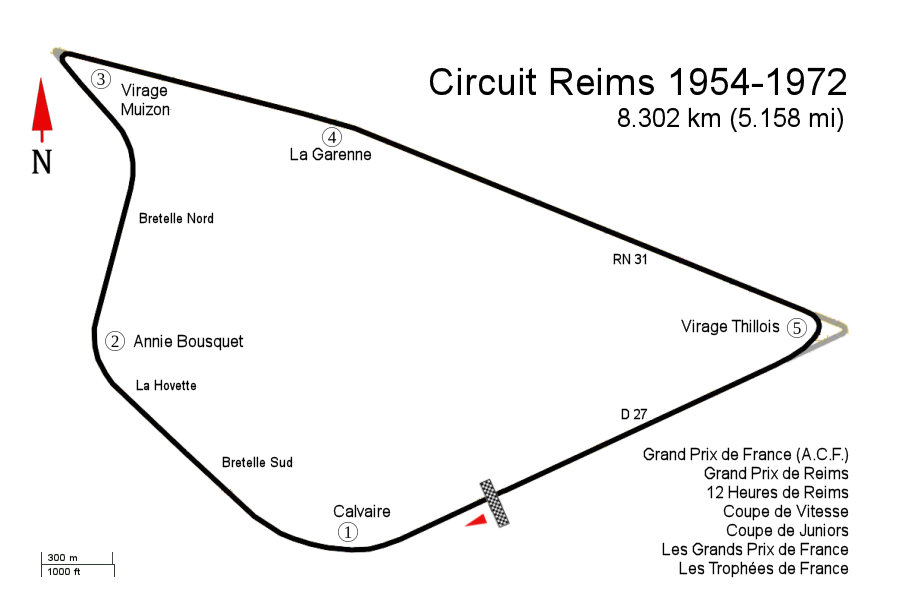

12 Heures internationales de Reims
- Venue: Circuit de Reims-Gueux
- Location: Reims, France; 49°15′14.67″N 3°55′50.02″E
- First race: 1926 Coupe d'Or
- First series race: 1953
- Last race: 1967 Gueux
- Distance: 2458.256 km
- Laps: 296
- Duration: 12 hours
- Previous names: Coupe d'Or
- Most wins (driver): (United Kingdom) Peter Whitehead (2) (Belgium) Olivier Gendebien (2) (Belgium) Paul Frere (2)
- Most wins (team): (Belgium) Ecurie Francorchamps
- Most wins (manufacturer): (United Kingdom) Jaguar (4)

Circuit information
- Surface: Asphalt
- Length: 8.302 km (5.159 mi)
- Turns: 8
- Lap record: 2:10.5 ( (Australia) Paul Hawkins, (United Kingdom) Lola T70 Mk3, 1967, Prototype)

The 12 Hours of Reims (official name: 12 Heures internationales de Reims) was a sports car endurance race held from 1953 to 1967 at the Reims (Gueux) circuit in the Marne district of the Champagne region in north-eastern France. The 1926 Coupe d’Or was the first 12-hour endurance race held at Reims and is considered to be the direct ancestor of the modern endurance series.

== 12 Hours of Reims race names ==
- 1953: 12 heures internationales - 40th Grand Prix de l'ACF
- 1954: 12 heures internationales - Voiture Sport Reims
- 1956: 42nd Grand Prix de l'ACF - 12 heures internationales Reims
- 1957: Les 12 heures internationales - Les Grands Prix Reims
- 1958: V 12 heures internationales - 44th Grand Prix de l'ACF
- 1964: Trophée France-Amérique - Les 12 heures internationales de Reims
- 1965: Grands Prix de France Reims - Trophée Fédération française des Sports Automobiles
- 1967: 12 heures internationales Reims

== The 12 Hours of Reims by year ==
Year	Drivers	Team	Car	Group	Laps	Distance (Miles)	Speed	Report
1926	(France) Roger Gauthier	Private	(France) Bignan 2LC	N/A	N/A	1,056 km (656 mi)	N/A	Report
1927 – 1952	Not held							
1953	(United Kingdom) Stirling Moss (United Kingdom) Peter Whitehead	(United Kingdom) P.N. Whitehead	(United Kingdom) Jaguar C-Type	S+2.0	243	2,063.356 km (1,282.110 mi)	169.696 km/h (105.444 mph)	Report
1954	(United Kingdom) Ken Wharton (United Kingdom) Peter Whitehead	(United Kingdom) Jaguar Cars Ltd.	(United Kingdom) Jaguar D-type	S3.0	222	2,018.826 km (1,254.440 mi)	169.000 km/h (105.011 mph)	Report
1955	Cancelled							
1956	(United Kingdom) Duncan Hamilton (United Kingdom) Ivor Bueb	(United Kingdom) Jaguar Cars Ltd.	(United Kingdom) Jaguar D-type	S3.5	258	2,143.735 km (1,332.055 mi)	178.64 km/h (111.002 mph)	Report
1957	(Belgium) Olivier Gendebien (Belgium) Paul Frère	(Belgium) Ecurie Francorchamps	(Italy) Ferrari 250 GT	GT+2.0	241	2,000.782 km (1,243.228 mi)	166.730 km/h (103.60 mph)	Report
1958	(Belgium) Olivier Gendebien (Belgium) Paul Frère	(Belgium) Ecurie Francorchamps	(Italy) Ferrari 250 GT	GT+2.0	247	2,048.060 km (1,272.605 mi)	170.670 km/h (106.050 mph)	Report
1959 – 1963	Not held							
1964	(United Kingdom) Graham Hill (Sweden) Jo Bonnier	(United Kingdom) Maranello Concessionaires	(Italy) Ferrari 250 LM	P+3.0	296	2,448.933 km (1,521.696 mi)	204.080 km/h (126.810 mph)	Report
1965	(Mexico) Pedro Rodríguez (France) Jean Guichet	(United States) N.A.R.T.	(Italy) Ferrari 365 P2	P+3.0	285	2,365.454 km (1,469.825 mi)	197.120 km/h (122.49 mph)	Report
1966	Cancelled							
1967	(France) Jo Schlesser (France) Guy Ligier	Ecurie Ford France	(United States) Ford GT40 Mk IIA	P+3.0	296	2,458.256 km (1,527.489 mi)	204.85 km/h (127.290 mph)	Report
1968	Cancelled							
Coupe d'Or (1st 12 hrs of Reims) - Sportscar World Championship - Sources:
