= 1967 12 Hours of Reims =

Coordinates: 49°15′14.67″N 3°55′50.02″E

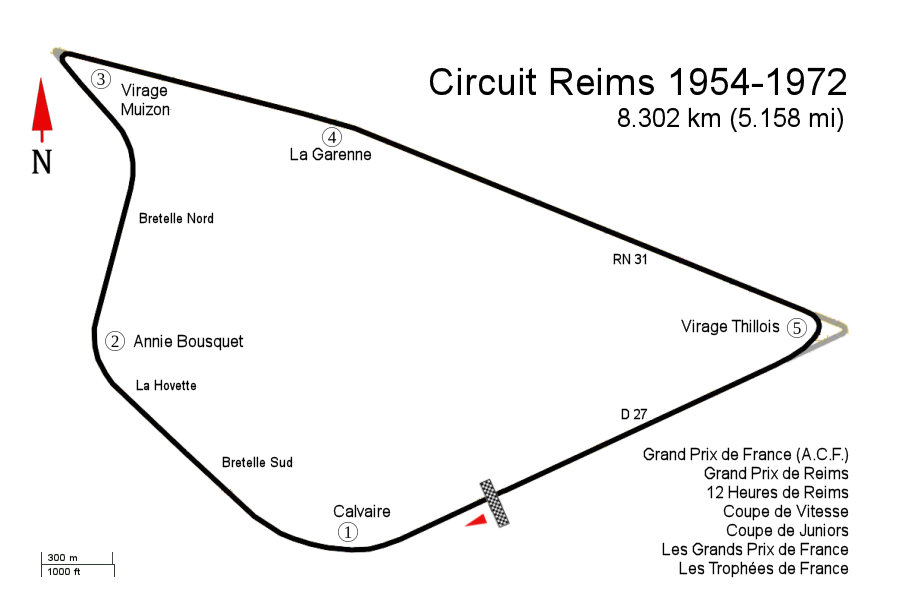
Reims-Gueux (1954-1972)

The 12 Hours of Reims (official name: 12 Heures internationales de Reims) were a sports car endurance racing series held from 1953 to 1967 at the circuit Reims (Gueux). The start of the race was at midnight in "LeMans style" (drivers running across the track) with the cars lined up in order of their fastest practice times.

== Race report ==
- 12 Heures Internationales - Reims
- Saturday, June 25, 1967, Circuit Reims (France), 8.302 km
- Classes Prototypes: +2000 cc (P+2.0), 1600 cc (P1.6), 1300 cc (P1.3)
- Classes Sport, Grand Touring: +2000 cc (S+2.0), 2000 cc (S2.0), 2000 cc (GT2.0), 1300 cc (GT1.3)
- Pole Position overall: (United Kingdom) #4 Lola T70 MK3, (Australia) Paul Hawkins, 2:07.9 - 233.68 km/h (145.20 mph)
- Fastest Lap overall: (United Kingdom) #4 Lola T70 MK3, (Australia) Paul Hawkins, 2:10.5 - 229.02 km/h (142.30 mph)

=== Results Overall ===
Pos	No	Drivers	Team	Constructor / Car	Class	Laps	Distance	km/h - mph av.
1	1	(France) Guy Ligier (France) Jo Schlesser	Ford France	(United States) Ford GT40 MK IIB	P+2.0	296	2457.392 km	204.78 km/h (127.25 mph)
2	9	(United Kingdom) David Piper (Switzerland) Jo Siffert	(United Kingdom) David Piper	(Italy) Ferrari 365 P2	P+2.0	289	2399.278 km	199.94 km/h (124.24 mph)
3	35	(France) Robert Buchet (Germany) Hans Herrmann	(Private)	(Germany) Porsche 906	S2.0	284	2357.768 km	196.48 km/h (122.09 mph)
4	27	(Switzerland) Dieter Spoerry (Switzerland) Rico Steinemann	(Switzerland) Squadra Tartaruga	(Germany) Porsche 906 LH	P2.0	281	2332.862 km	194.41 km/h (120.80 mph)
5	37	(Switzerland) Edgar Berney (Switzerland) André Wicky	(Switzerland) André Wicky	(Germany) Porsche 906	S2.0	277	2299.654 km	191.64 km/h (119.08 mph)
6	36	(United Kingdom) Vic Elford (United Kingdom) William Bradley	(United Kingdom) Midland Racing	(Germany) Porsche 906	S2.0	270	2241.540 km	186.80 km/h (116.07 mph)
7	17	(United Kingdom) Peter Sutcliffe (United Kingdom) Richard Bond	(United Kingdom) Peter Sutcliffe	(United States) Ford GT40	S+2.0	267	2216.634 km	184.72 km/h (114.78 mph)
8	18	(United Kingdom) Colin Crabbe (United Kingdom) Roy Pierpoint	(United Kingdom) Colin Crabbe	(United States) Ford GT40	S+2.0	259	2150.218 km	179.18 km/h (111.34 mph)
9	66	(France) Jean-Louis Marnat (France) Roger de Lageneste	(France) Automobiles Alpine	(France) Alpine A210	P1.3	258	2141.916 km	178.49 km/h (110.91 mph)
10	65	(France) André de Cortanze (France) Alain LeGuellec	(France) Automobiles Alpine	(France) Alpine A210	P1.3	256	2125.312 km	177.11 km/h (110.05 mph)
11	58	(Belgium) Teddy Pilette (Belgium) Serge Trosch	(Italy) VDS Racing	(Italy) Alfa Romeo Giulia TZ	P1.6	252	2092.104 km	174.34 km/h (108.33 mph)
12	16	(United Kingdom) Edward Nelson (United Kingdom) Eric Liddell	(United Kingdom) Ed Nelson	(United States) Ford GT40	S+2.0	249	2067.198 km	172.27 km/h (107.04 mph)
13	67	(France) Alain Bertaut (France) André Guilhaudin	(France) C.D. Racing	(France) C.D. SP66C Peugeot	P1.3	243	2017.386 km	168.12 km/h (104.46 mph)
14	45	(France) Sylvain Garant (Switzerland) Jacques Rey	(Private)	(United Kingdom) Porsche 911 S	GT2.0	233`	1934.366 km	161.20 km/h (100.16 mph)
15	61	(France) Gérard Larrousse (France) Jean-Claude Andruet	(France) Automobiles Alpine	(France) Alpine A110	GT1.3	232	1926.064 km	160.51 km/h (99.73 mph)
16	49	(United Kingdom) Roger Enever (Republic of Ireland) Alec Poole	N/A	(United Kingdom) MGB	GT2.0	204	1693.608 km	141.13 km/h (87.70 mph)
17	46	(France) Alain Finkel (France) Jean-Pierre Hanrioud	(Private)	(Germany) Porsche 911 S	GT2.0	197	1635.494 km	136.29 km/h (84.69 mph)
DNF	26	(France) Jean-Pierre Jaussaud (France) Henri Pescarolo	(France) Matra Sports	(France) Matra MS630 BRM 02	P2.0	77	639.254 km	Transmission
DNF	2	(United Kingdom) John Surtees (United Kingdom) David Hobbs	(United Kingdom) Lola Cars	(United Kingdom) Lola T70 Mk.3 GT Chevrolet	P+2.0			Crankshaft
DNF	3	(New Zealand) Denny Hulme (Australia) Frank Gardner	(Republic of Ireland) Sid Taylor Team Elite	(United Kingdom) Lola T70 Mk.3 GT Chevrolet	P+2.0			Water pump
DNF	4	(United Kingdom) Jackie Epstein (Australia) Paul Hawkins	(United Kingdom) Jackie Epstein	(United Kingdom) Lola T70 Mk.3 GT Chevrolet	P+2.0			Gearbox (housing)
DNF	5	(United Kingdom) Mike De Udy (United Kingdom) Hugh Dibley	(United Kingdom) Mike De Udy	(United Kingdom) Lola T70 Mk.3 GT Chevrolet	P+2.0			Electrical
DNF	15	(France) Henri Greder (France) Jean-Michel Giorgi	Ford France	(United States) Ford GT40	S+2.0			N/A
DNF	19	(United Kingdom) Richard Attwood (Belgium) Mauro Bianchi	(United Kingdom) David Piper	(Italy) Ferrari 250 LM	S+2.0			N/A
DNF	20	(United Kingdom) David Prophet (United Kingdom) John Fitzpatrick	(United Kingdom) David Prophet	(Italy) Ferrari 250 LM	P+2.0			Hub bearing
DNF	24	(Italy) Umberto Maglioli (Italy) Nino Vaccarella	(Italy) Brescia Corse	(United States) Ford GT40	P2.0			Engine
DNF	28	(Mexico) Pedro Rodriguez (France) Jean Guichet	(United States) N.A.R.T.	(Italy) Dino 206 S	P2.0			N/A
DNF	32	(United Kingdom) Mike Knight (France) Simon Delatour	(United Kingdom) Wingfield	(United Kingdom) Lotus 47 Climax	P1.6			N/A
DNF	33	(United Kingdom) Julian Sutton (United Kingdom) Andrew Hedges	(United Kingdom) Fawdington & Ramsey	(United Kingdom) Lotus 47 Climax	P1.6			N/A
DNF	38	(United States) Roy Pike (Australia) John Raeburn	(United Kingdom) Mike De Udy	(Germany) Porsche 906	S2.0			Valve
DNF	48	(France) Gahan ? (Spain) Pedro (Ketelsen?)	(Private)	(Germany) Porsche 911 S	GT2.0			Gearbox
DNF	52	(France) Henri Grandsire (France) Patrick Depailler	(France) Automobiles Alpine	(France) Alpine A210	P1.6			Engine
DNF	55	(Belgium) Mauro Bianchi (France) Jean Vinatier	(France) Automobiles Alpine	(France) Alpine A210	P1.6			Engine
DNF	59	(United Kingdom) Mark Konig (United Kingdom) Rollo Fielding	(United Kingdom) Nomad	(United Kingdom) Nomad Mk.1 Ford	P1.6			Clutch

=== Winners by class ===
Class	Drivers	Team	Constructor	Laps	Distance	km/h - mph av.
P+2.0	(France) Guy Ligier (France) Jo Schlesser	Ford France	(United States) Ford GT40 MK IIB	296	2457.392 km	204.78 km/h (127.25 mph)
P1.6	(Belgium) Teddy Pilette (Belgium) Serge Trosch	(Italy) VDS Racing	(Italy) Alfa Romeo Giulia TZ	252	2092.104 km	174.34 km/h (108.33 mph)
P1.3	(France) Jean-Louis Marnat (France) Roger de Lageneste	(France) Automobiles Alpine	(France) Alpine A210	258	2141.916 km	178.49 km/h (110.91 mph)
S+2.0	(United Kingdom) Peter Sutcliffe (United Kingdom) Richard Bond	(United Kingdom) Peter Sutcliffe	(United States) Ford GT40	267	2216.634 km	184.72 km/h (114.78 mph)
S2.0	(France) Robert Buchet (Germany) Hans Herrmann	(Private)	(Germany) Porsche 906	284	2357.768 km	196.48 km/h (122.09 mph)
GT2.0	(France) Sylvain Garant (Switzerland) Jacques Rey	(Private)	(United Kingdom) Porsche 911 S	233`	1934.366 km	161.20 km/h (100.16 mph)
GT1.3	(France) Gérard Larrousse (France) Jean-Claude Andruet	(France) Automobiles Alpine	(France) Alpine A110	232	1926.064 km	160.51 km/h (99.73 mph)
