= Gueux, Marne =

Gueux
- Commune
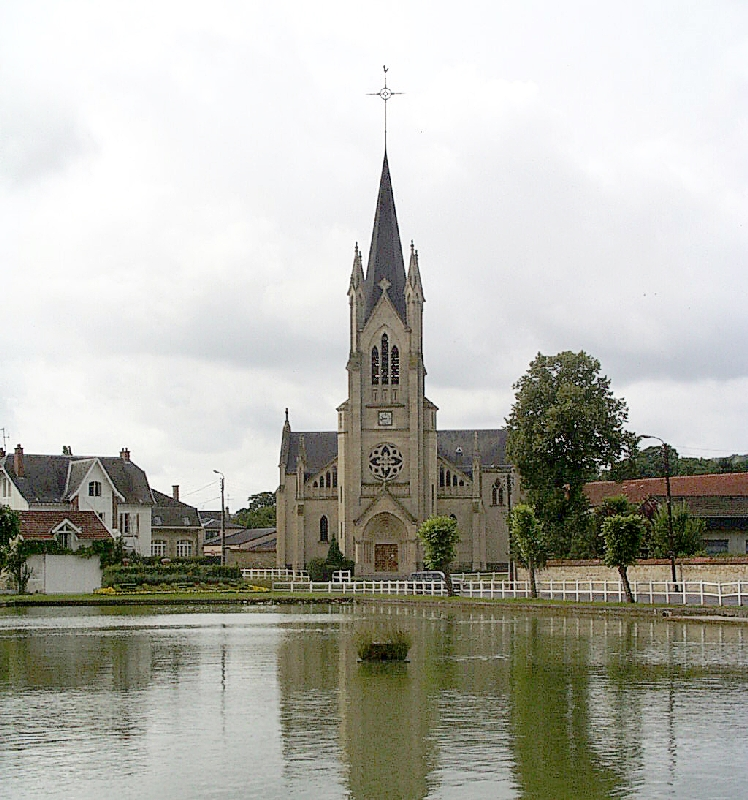
- The church in Gueux

- Coat of arms
- Location of Gueux
- Location within France Location within Grand Est
- Coordinates: 49°15′03″N 3°54′32″E
- Country: France
- Region: Grand Est
- Department: Marne
- Arrondissement: Reims
- Canton: Fismes-Montagne de Reims
- Intercommunality: CU Grand Reims

Government
  - Mayor (2020–2026): Jean-Pierre Ronseaux
- Area^{1}: 8.86 km^{2} (3.42 sq mi)
- Elevation: 110 m (360 ft)
- Highest elevation: 210 m (690 ft)
- Lowest elevation: 77 m (253 ft)
- Population (2023): 1,907
  - Density: 215/km^{2} (557/sq mi)
- Demonym: Gueuxiens
- Time zone: UTC+01:00 (CET)
  - Summer (DST): UTC+02:00 (CEST)
- INSEE/Postal code: 51282 /51390
- ^{1} French Land Register data, which excludes lakes, ponds, glaciers > 1 km^{2} (0.386 sq mi or 247 acres) and river estuaries.

Gueux (French pronunciation: [ɡø]) is a commune in the Marne department in north-eastern France.

== See also ==
- Circuit de Reims-Gueux
- Communes of the Marne department
