= List of Ferrari competition cars =

The following is a complete list of racing cars manufactured by Ferrari.

== Current ==
Year	Car	Image	Category
2015	FXX-K		XX Programmes
2017	FXX-K Evo		XX Programmes
2023	296 GT3		FIA GT3
2023	499P		Le Mans Hypercar
2024	296 Challenge		Ferrari Challenge
2026	SF-26		Formula One

== Past ==
=== Sports cars & GT ===
- 1940 Auto Avio Costruzioni 815
- 1947 125 S
- 1947 159 S
- 1948 166 S/SC/MM
- 1950 195 S
- 1950 275 S
- 1951 340 America
- 1951 212 Export
- 1952 225 S
- 1952 250 S
- 1952 340 Mexico
- 1953 250 MM
- 1953 Ferrari-Abarth 166 MM/53
- 1953 625 TF
- 1953 735 S
- 1953 500 Mondial
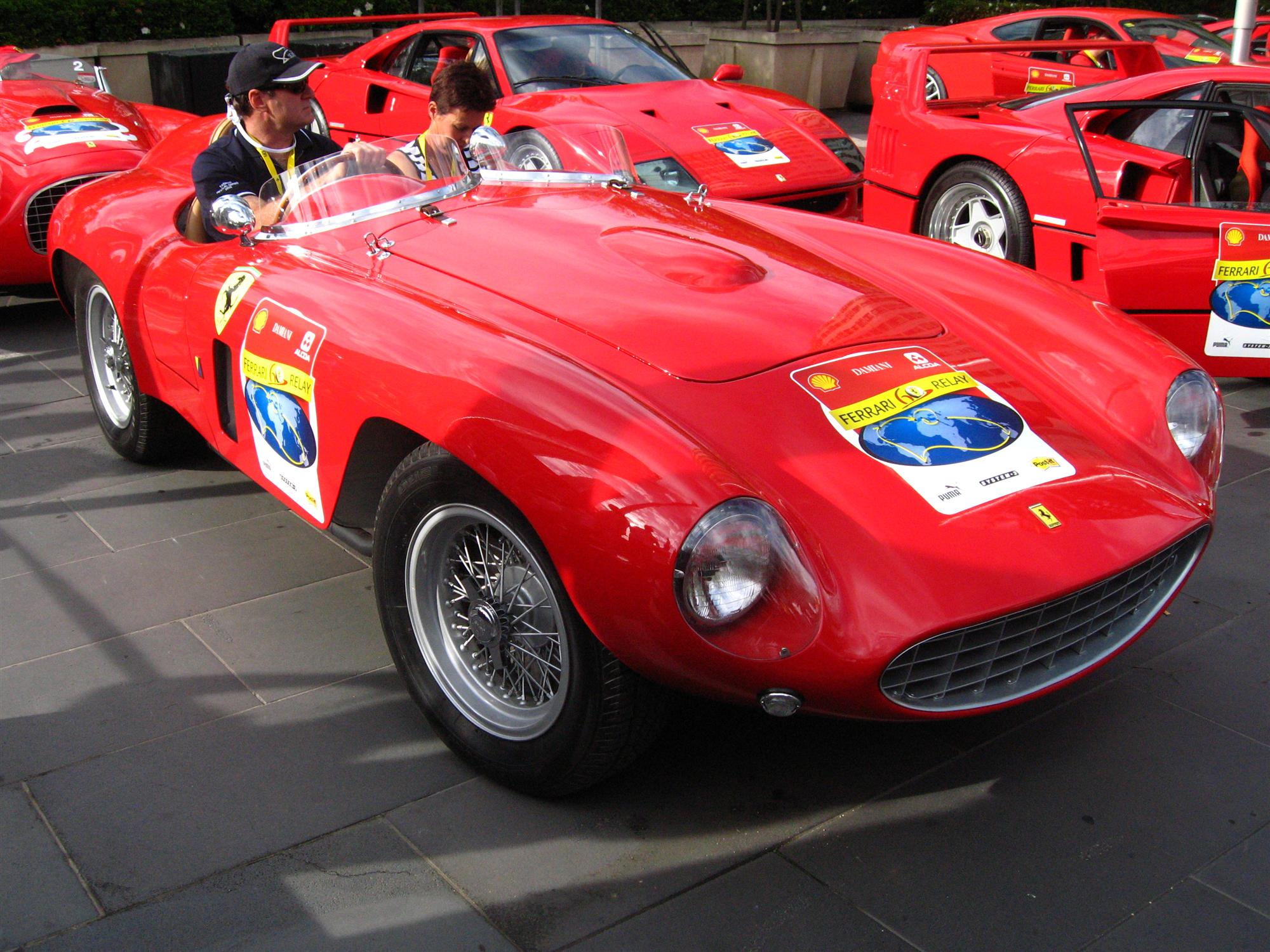
  Ferrari 750 Monza
- 1953 340 MM
- 1953 375 MM
- 1954 750 Monza
- 1954 250 Monza
- 1954 375 Plus
- 1955 376 S
- 1955 735 LM
- 1955 410 S
- 1955 857 S
- 1956 500 TR
- 1956 860 Monza
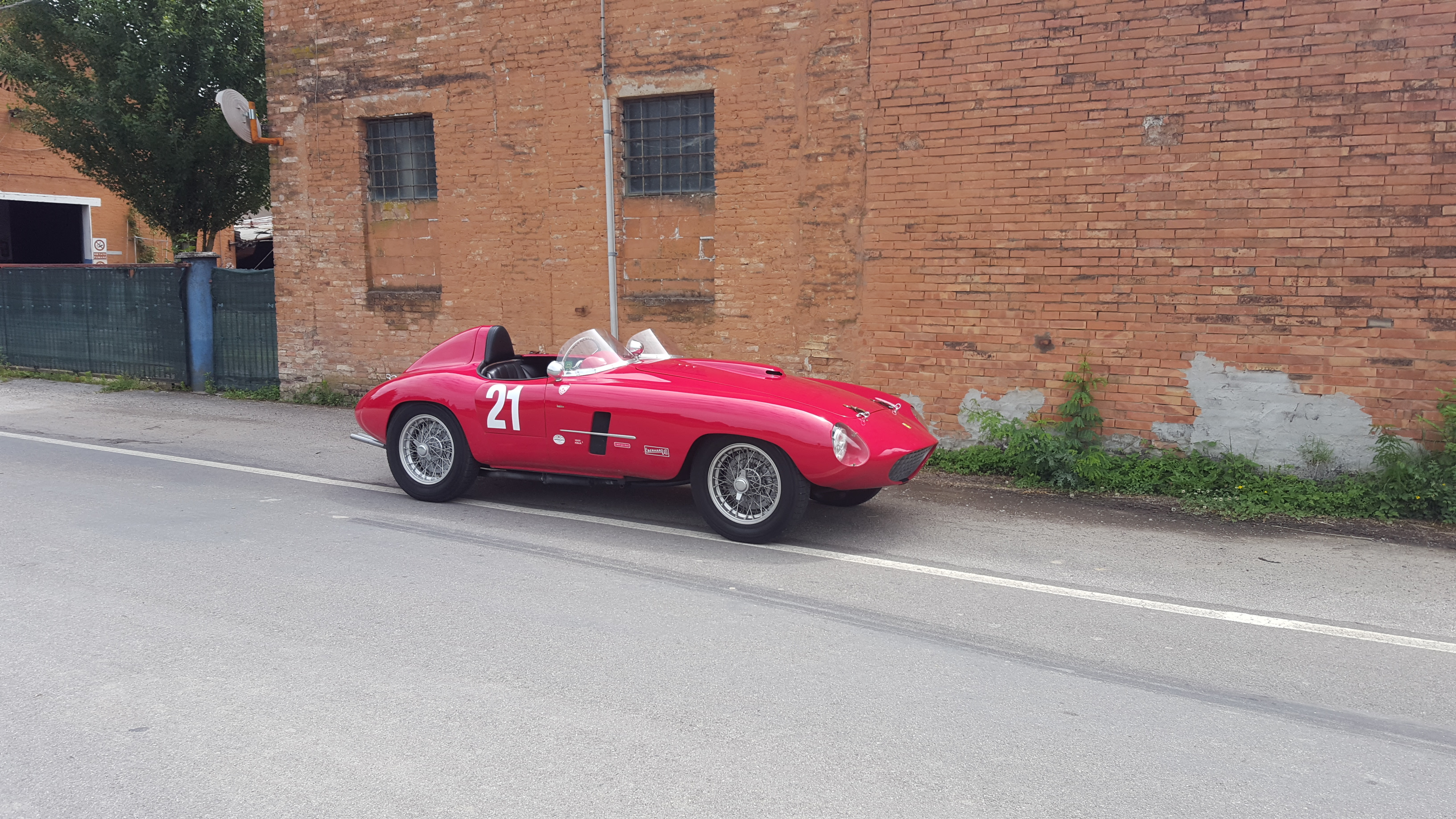
  Ferrari 166 MM/53 Scaglietti
- 1956 290 MM
- 1956 625 LM
- 1956 250 GT Berlinetta "Tour de France"
- 1957 290 S
- 1957 500 TRC
- 1957 315 S
- 1957 335 S
- 1957 250 Testa Rossa
- 1958 Dino 196 S
- 1958 Dino 296 S
- 1958 412 S
- 1959 250 GT Berlinetta "SWB"
  - 1962 250 GT SWB Breadvan
- 1960 Dino 246 S
- 1960 250 TR60
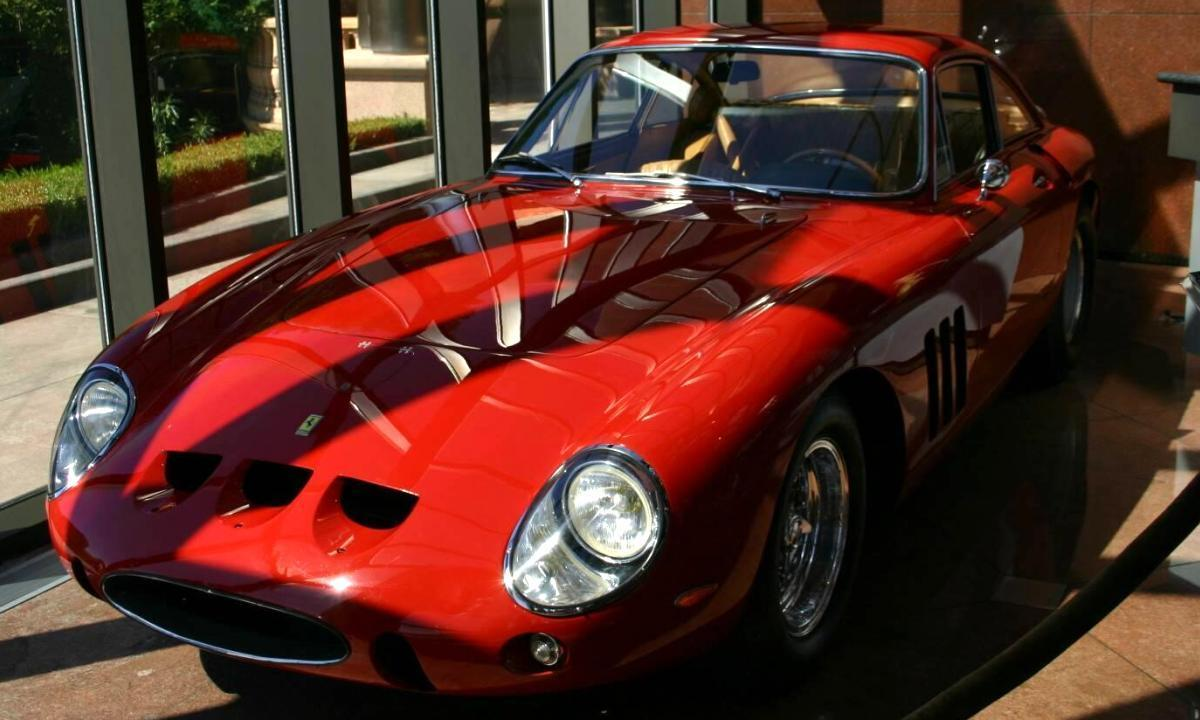
  1962 Ferrari 330 LM-B.
- 1960 250 TRI/61
- 1961 SP series
  - 1961 246 SP
  - 1962 196 SP
  - 1962 286 SP
  - 1962 248 SP
  - 1962 268 SP
- 1962 330 TRI/LM
- 1962 250 GTO
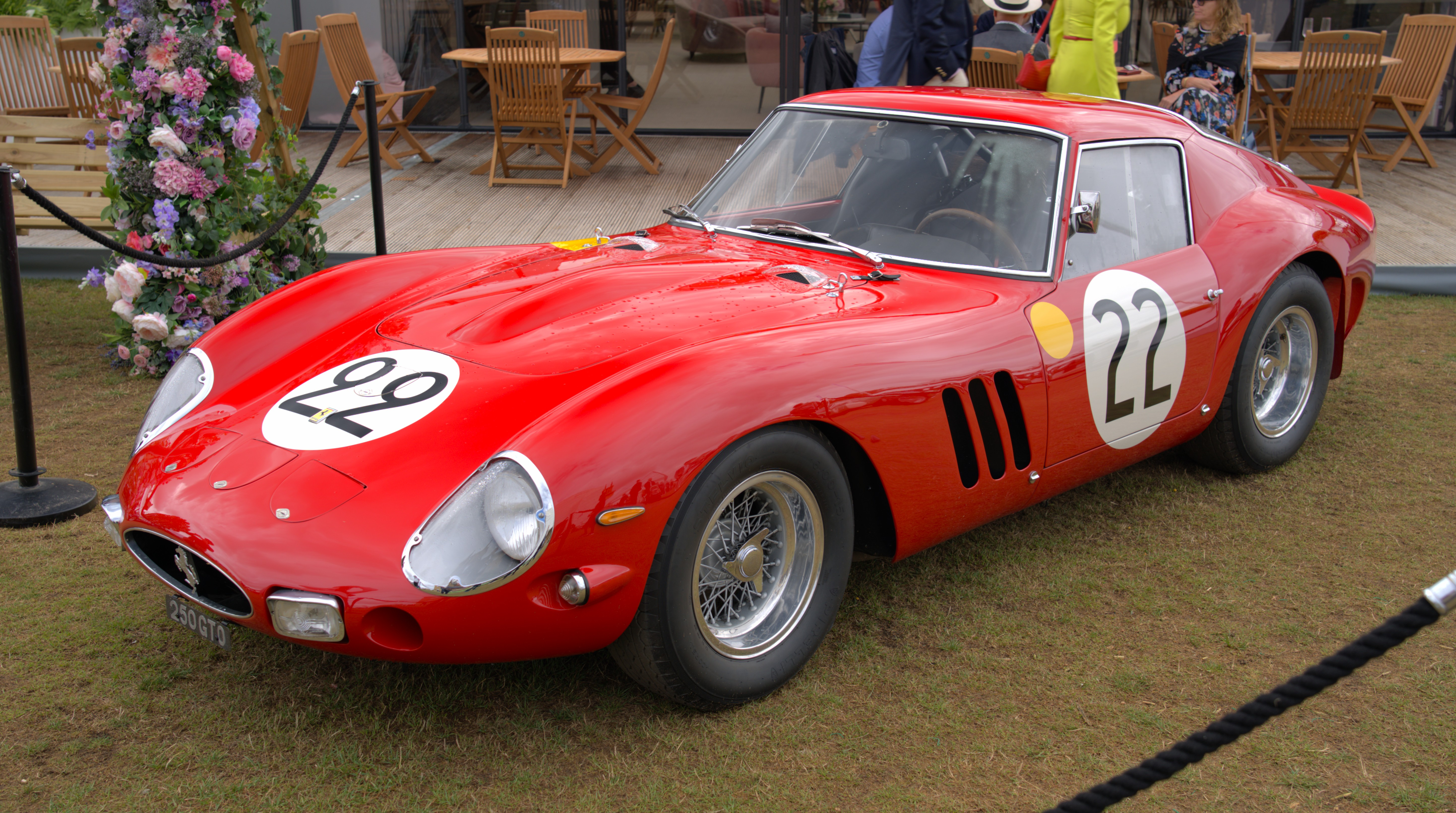
  1962 Ferrari 250 GTO
  - 1964 250 GTO/64
- 1963 330 LM Berlinetta
- 1963 P/LM series
  - 1963 250 P
  - 1964 250 LM
  - 1964 275 P
  - 1964 330 P
  - 1965 275 P2
  - 1965 330 P2
  - 1965 365 P2
  - 1966 330 P3
  - 1967 330 P4
  - 1967 412 P
- 1965 Dino 166 P
- 1965 Dino 206 SP
- 1965 275 GTB Competizione
- 1966 Dino 206 S
- 1968 212 E Montagna
- 1969 312 P
- 1969 512 S and 512 M
- 1971 312 PB
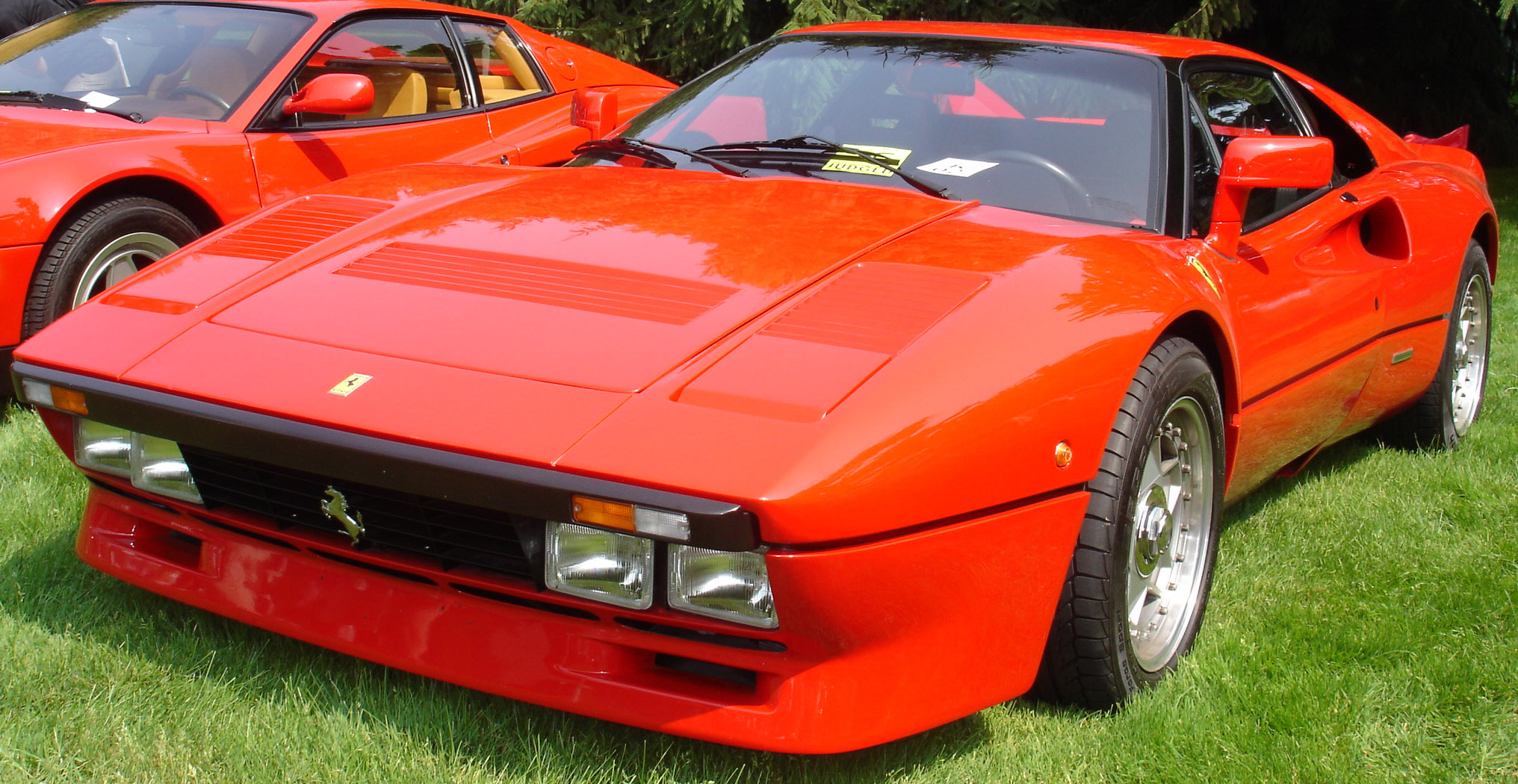
  Ferrari 288 GTO
- 1972 365 GTB/4 Daytona Competizione
- 1979 512 BB LM
- 1987 GTO Evoluzione
- 1987 F40
  - CSAI-GT
  - LM
  - GT
  - GTE
- 1994 333 SP
- 1994 348 GT LM
- 1995 F50 GT
- 1995 F355 GT3
- 2001 550 GTS
- 2001 360 Modena GT
- 2003 575M Maranello GTC
- 2004 360 Modena GTC
- 2006 F430 GTC
- 2007 F430 GT3
- 2009 F430 Scuderia GT3
- 2011 458 Italia GT2
- 2011 458 Italia GT3
- 2012 458 Italia Grand-Am
- 2016 488 GTE
- 2016 488 GT3
- 2023 296 GT3
- 2023 499P

=== Ferrari Challenge ===
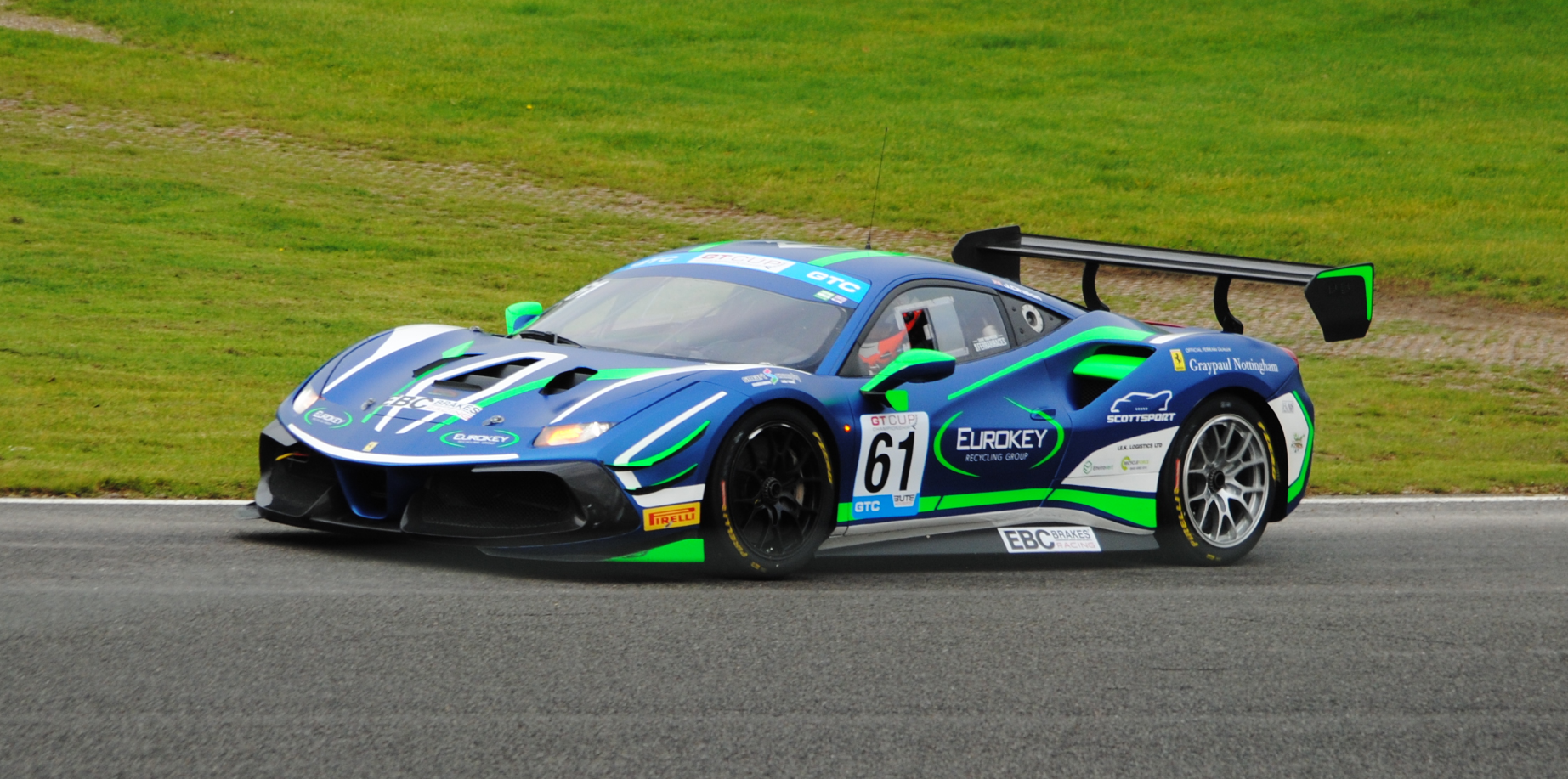
Ferrari 488 Challenge Evo

- 1993 348 Challenge
- 1995 F355 Challenge
- 2000 360 Modena Challenge
- 2006 F430 Challenge
- 2011 458 Challenge
  - 2013 458 Challenge Evo
- 2017 488 Challenge
  - 2020 488 Challenge Evo
- 2024 296 Challenge

=== XX Programmes ===
- 2005 FXX
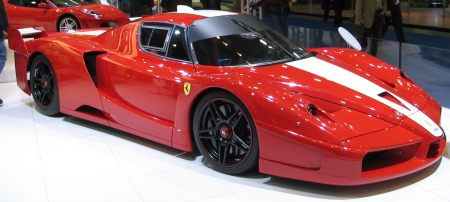
  Ferrari FXX
  - 2008 FXX Evo
- 2009 599XX
  - 2011 599XX Evo
- 2015 FXX-K
  - 2017 FXX-K Evo

=== Formula One ===
1. 1948 125 F1
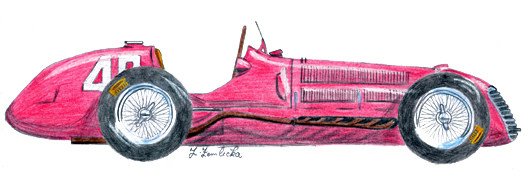
  Ferrari 125 F1
2. 1950 275 F1
3. 1950 340 F1
4. 1950 375 F1
5. 1951 212 F1
6. 1954 553 F1
7. 1954 625 F1
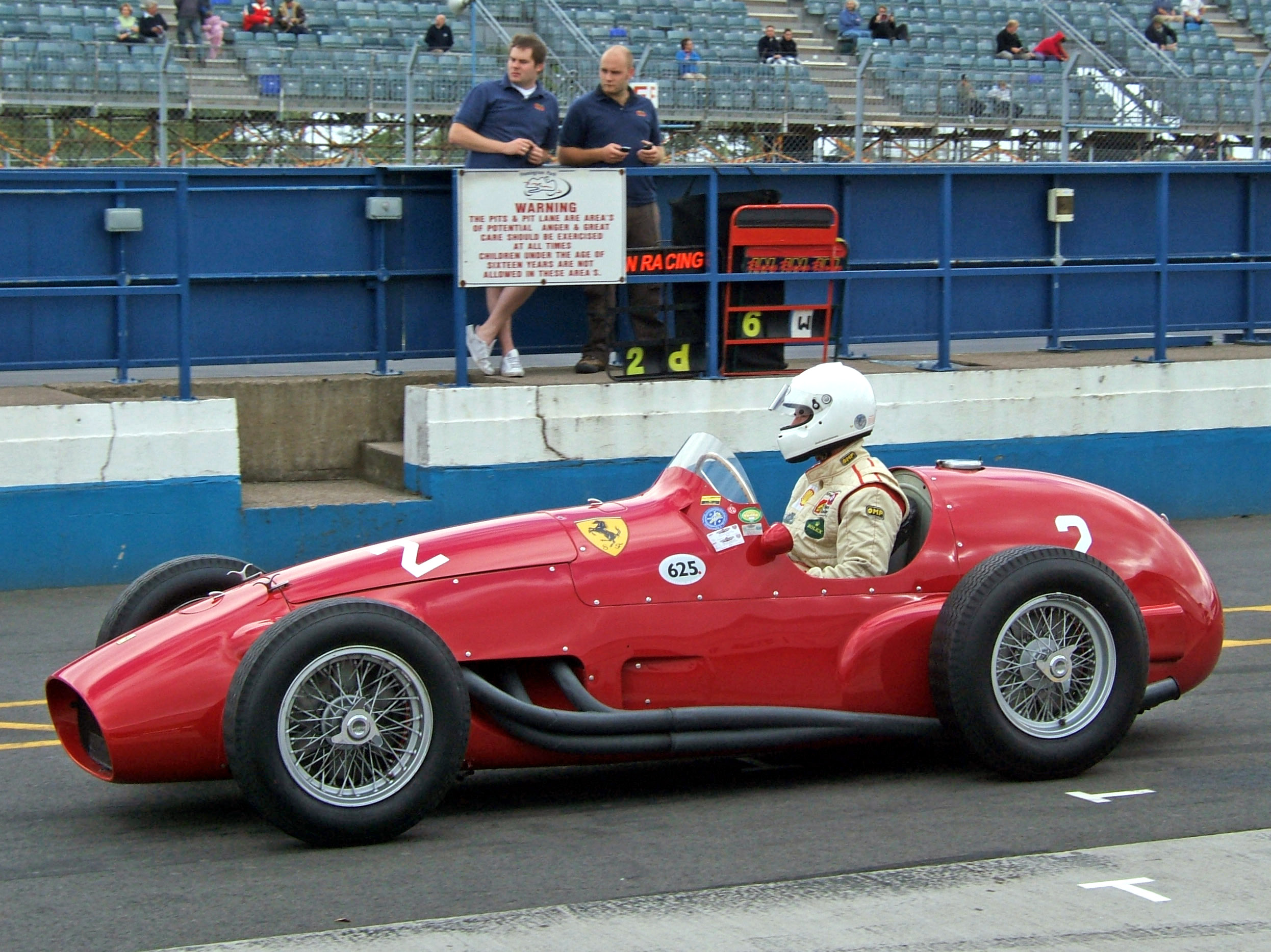
  Ferrari 625 F1
8. 1955 555 F1
9. 1955 Ferrari-Lancia D50
10. 1957 801 F1
11. 1958 246 F1
12. 1959 256 F1
13. 1960 246 P F1
14. 1961 156 F1
15. 1964 158 F1
16. 1964 512 F1 (aka 1512)
17. 1966 246 F1-66
18. 1966 312 F1
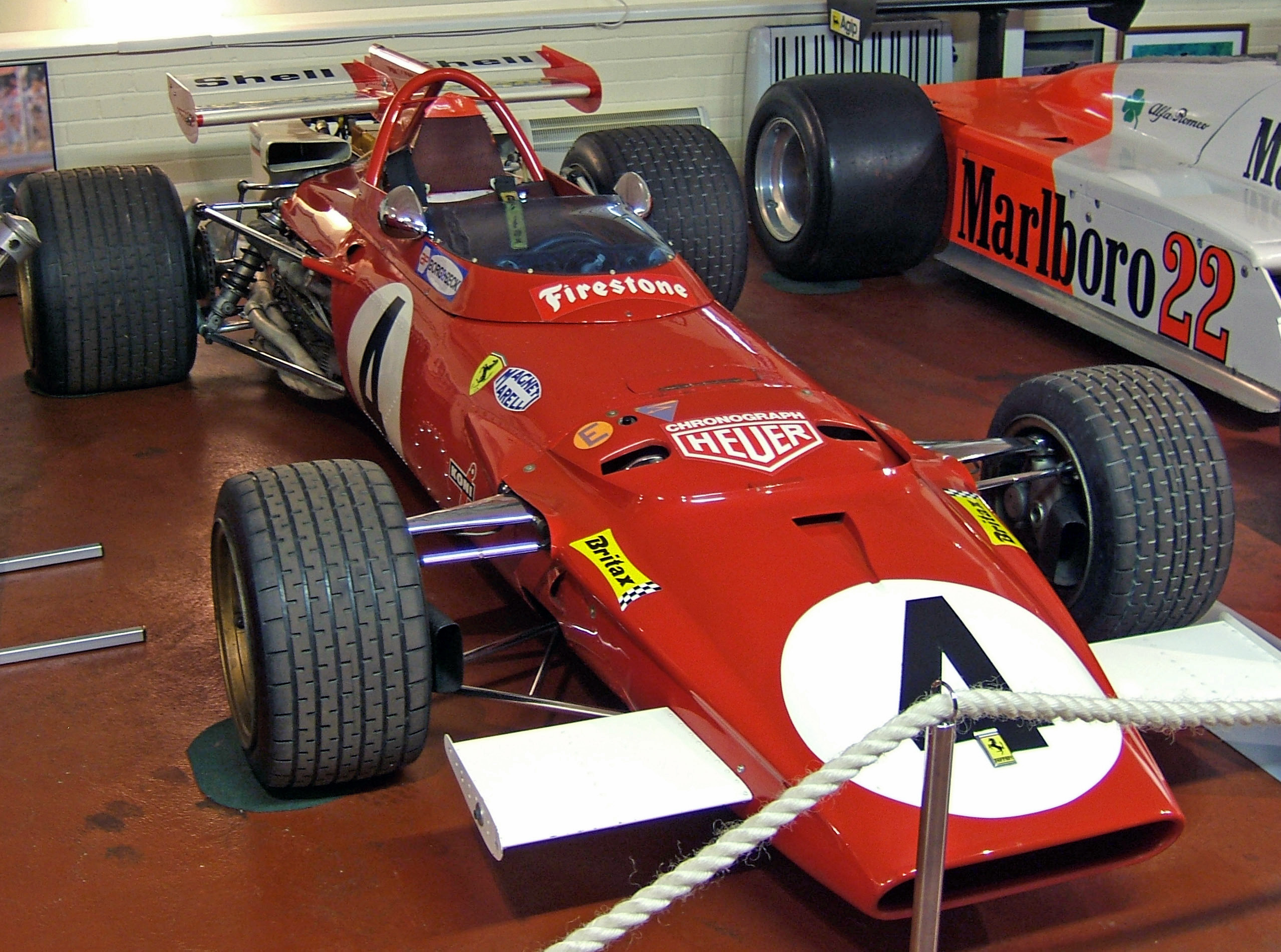
  Ferrari 312B
19. 1970 312 B
20. 1971 312 B2
21. 1973 312 B3
22. 1975 312 T
23. 1976 312 T2
24. 1978 312 T3
25. 1979 312 T4
26. 1980 312 T5
27. 1981 126 C
28. 1982 126 C2
29. 1983 126 C3
30. 1984 126 C4
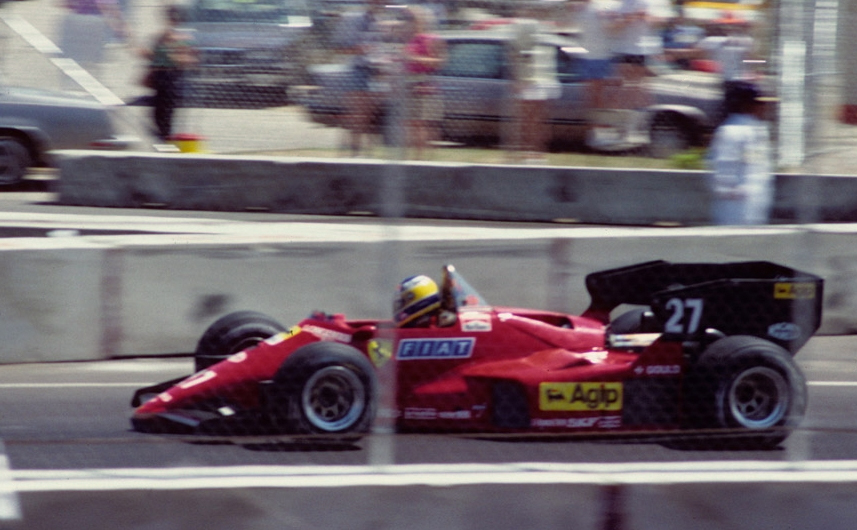
  Ferrari 126C4
31. 1985 156/85
32. 1986 F1-86
33. 1987 F1-87
34. 1988 F1-87/88C
35. 1989 640
36. 1990 641
37. 1991 642
38. 1991 643
39. 1992 F92A
40. 1993 F93A
41. 1994 412 T1
42. 1995 412 T2
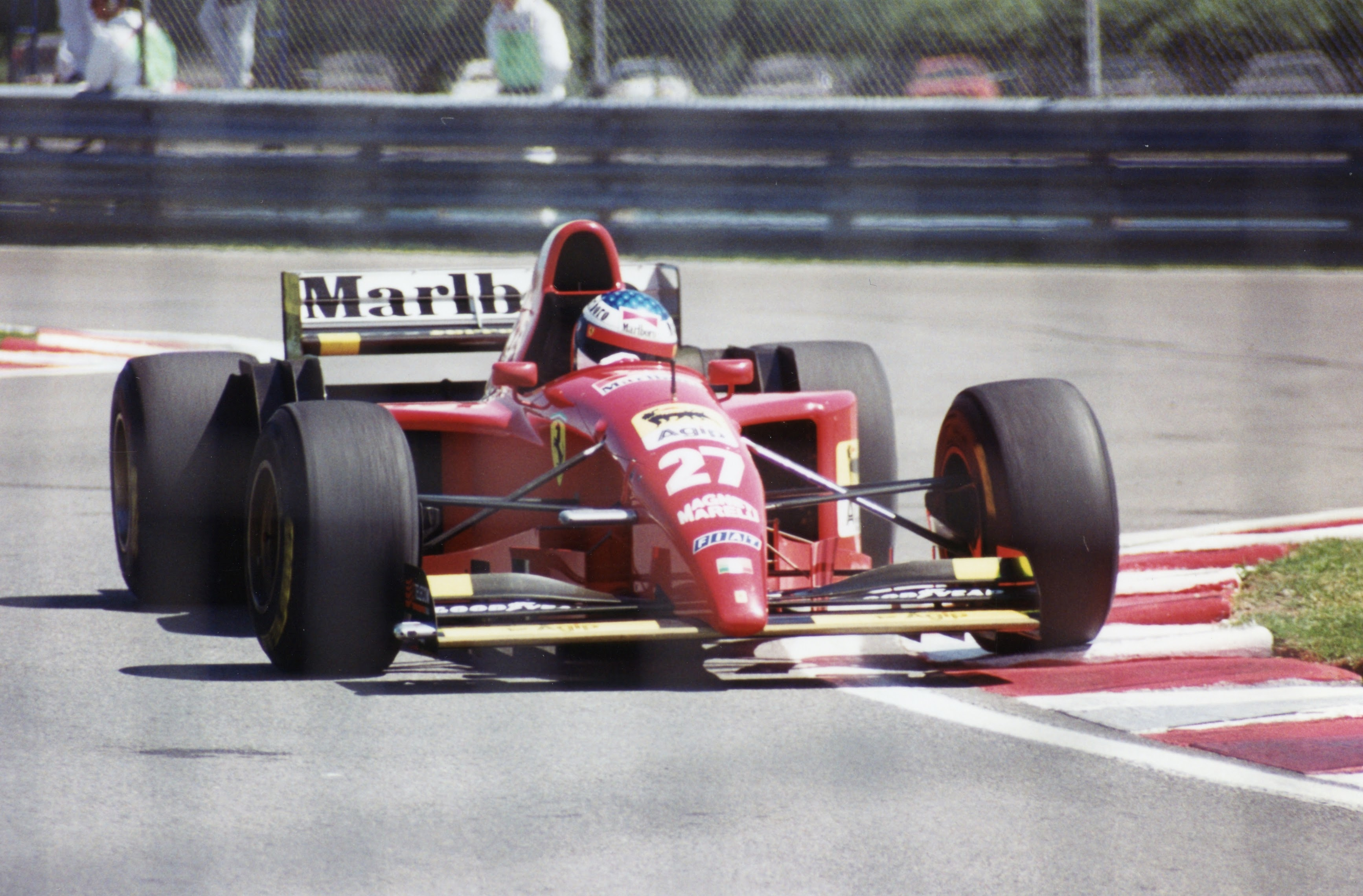
  Ferrari 412 T2
43. 1996 F310
44. 1997 F310B
45. 1998 F300
46. 1999 F399
47. 2000 F1-2000
48. 2001 F2001
49. 2002 F2002
50. 2003 F2003-GA
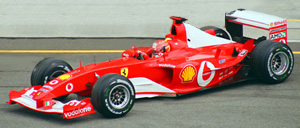
  Ferrari F2003-GA
51. 2004 F2004
52. 2005 F2005
53. 2006 248 F1
54. 2007 F2007
55. 2008 F2008
56. 2009 F60
57. 2010 F10
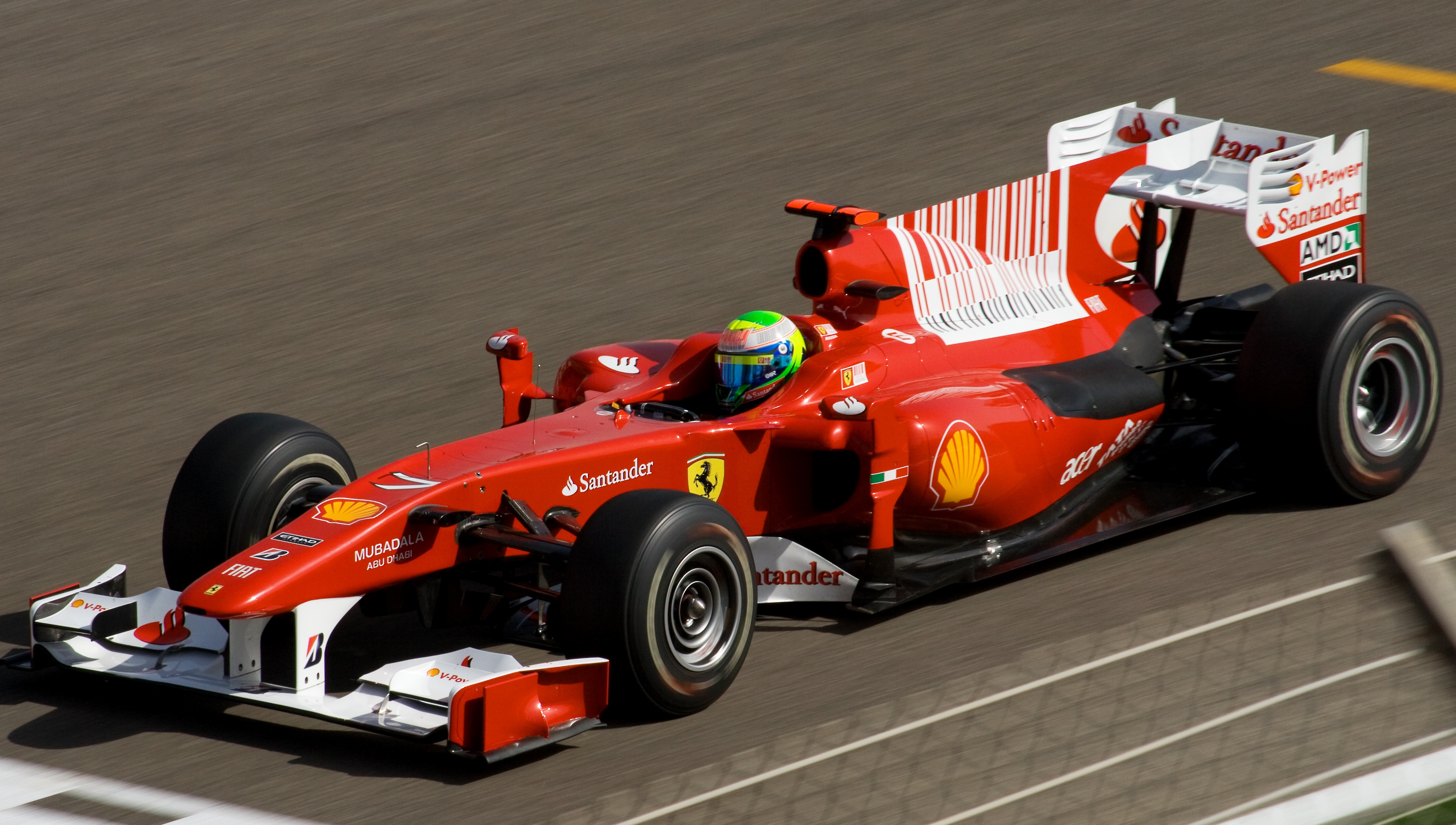
  Ferrari F10
58. 2011 150° Italia
59. 2012 F2012
60. 2013 F138
61. 2014 F14 T
62. 2015 SF15-T
63. 2016 SF16-H
64. 2017 SF70H
65. 2018 SF71H
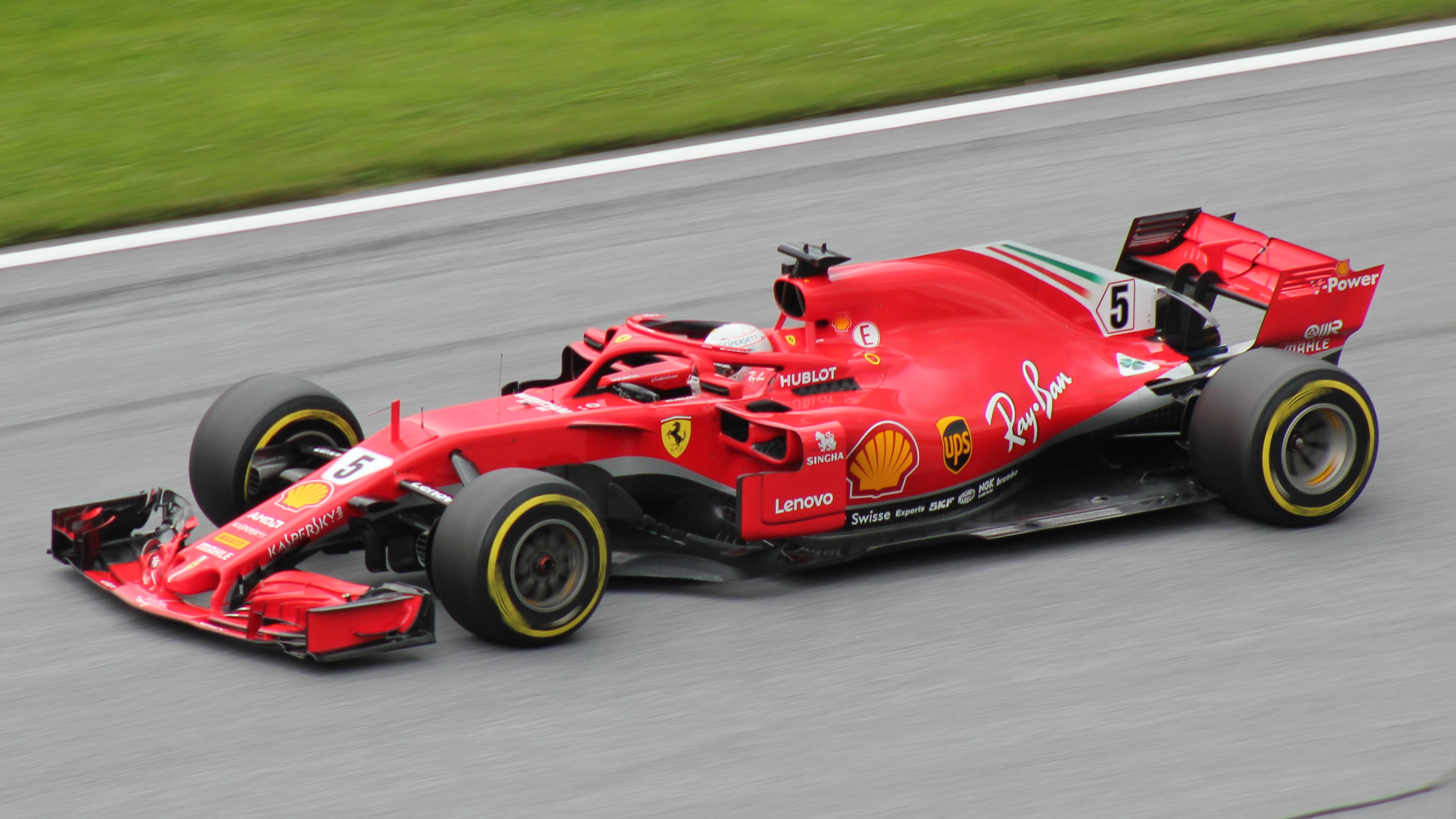
  Ferrari SF71H
66. 2019 SF90
67. 2020 SF1000
68. 2021 SF21
69. 2022 F1-75
70. 2023 SF-23
71. 2024 SF-24
72. 2025 SF-25
73. 2026 SF-26

=== Formula 2 ===
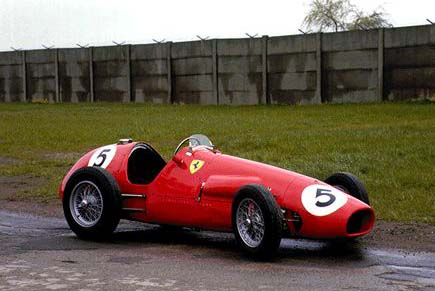
Ferrari 500

- 1948 166 F2
- 1951 500 F2
- 1953 553 F2
- 1957 Dino 156 F2
- 1960 156 F2
- 1967 Dino 166 F2

=== Other single-seaters ===
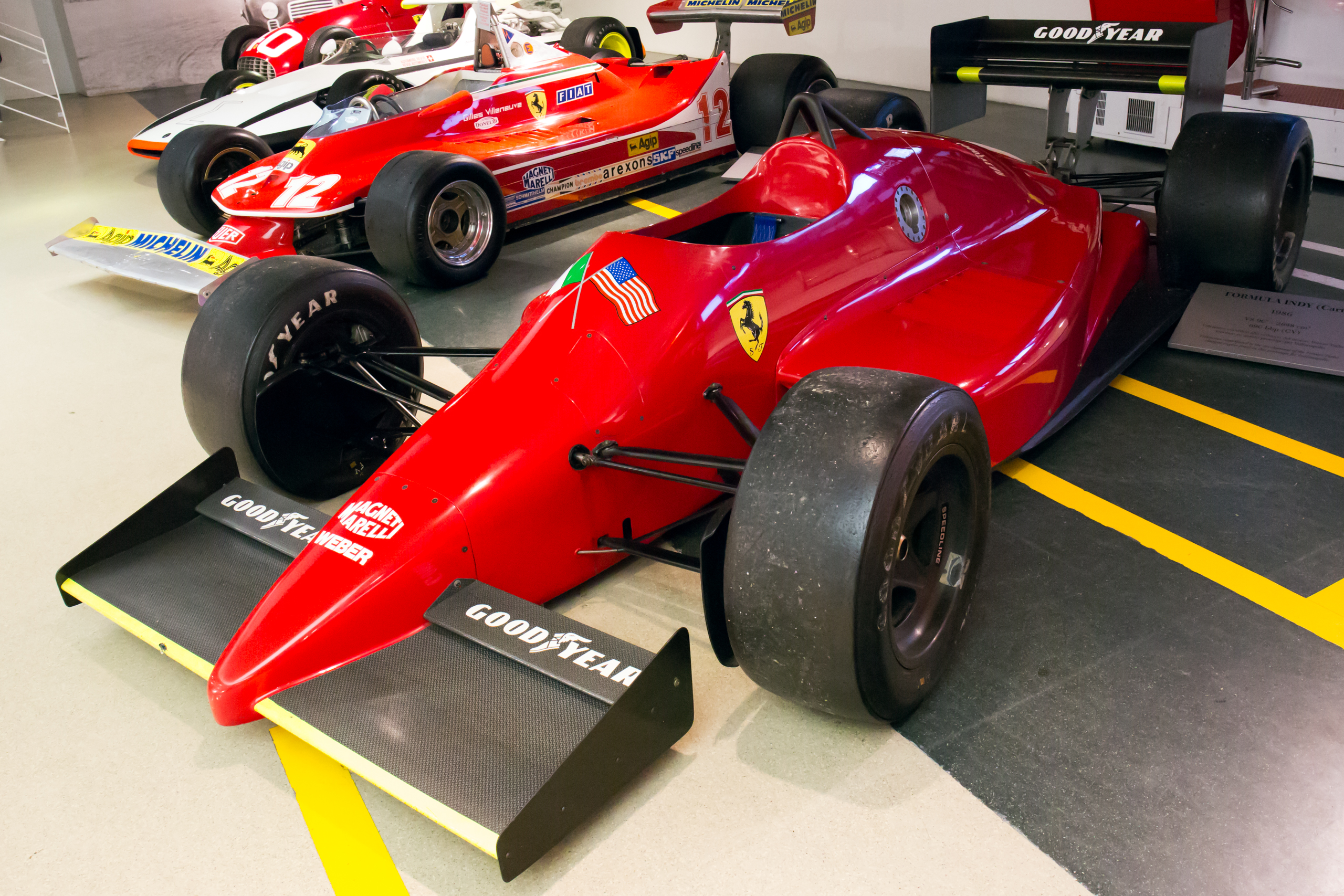
Ferrari 637

- 1949 166 FL
- 1952 375 Indianapolis
- 1958 326 MI
- 1958 412 MI
- 1968 Dino 246 Tasmania
- 1986 637 CART

=== Special Projects ===
- 2019 P80/C
- 2023 KC23

== See also ==
- List of Ferrari road cars
- List of Ferrari engines
