= XX Programmes =

Ferrari research and development program

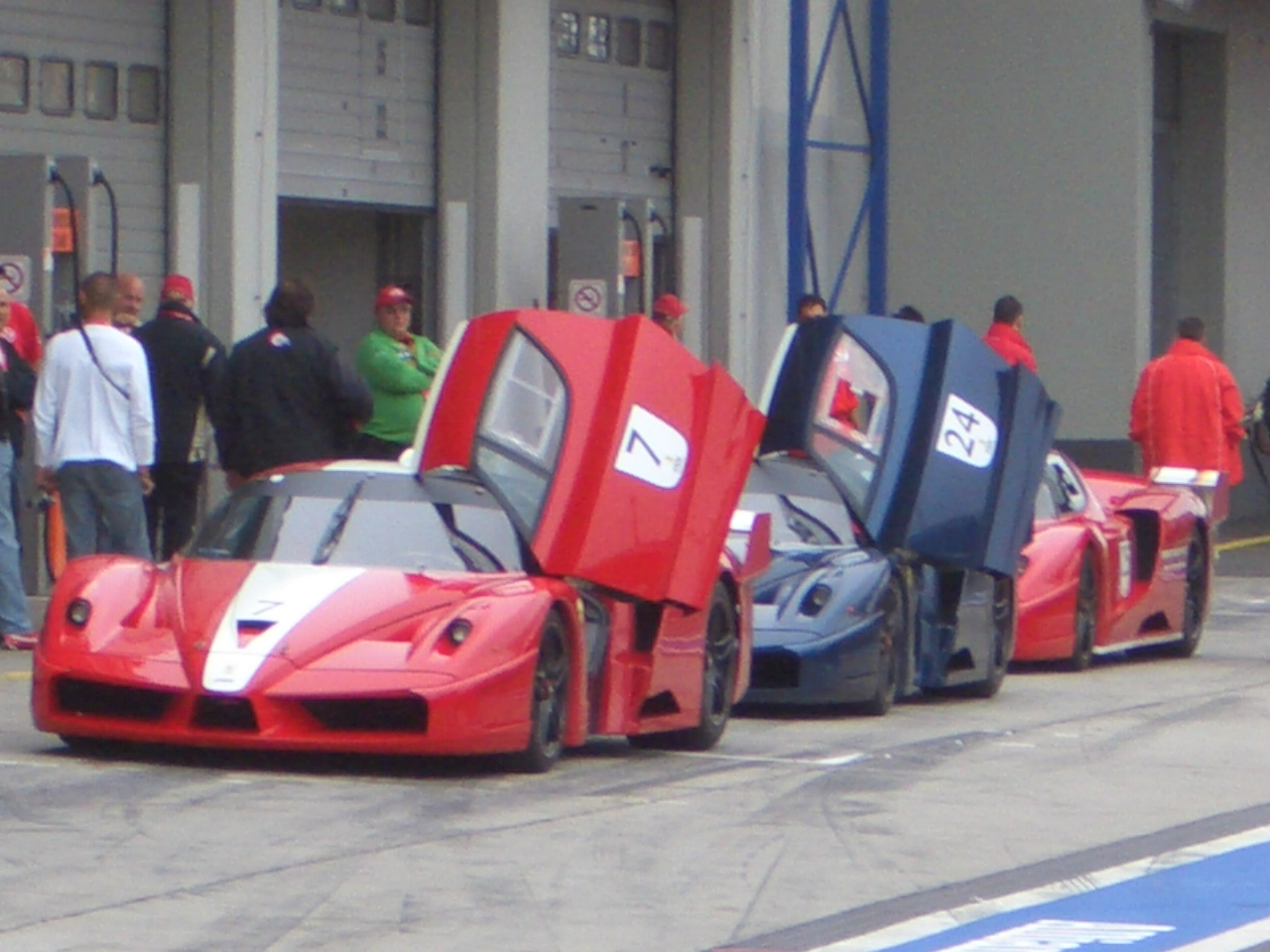
FXX Programmes

The XX Programmes (also known as the FXX Programmes) is a research and development program promoted by Ferrari to test technologies deriving from competitions and new solutions developed by suppliers on hyper cars from any homologation or regulation.

== History ==
=== 2005: FXX ===
The program was started in 2005 with the Ferrari FXX. The car was conceived to provide maximum driving experiences to the most exclusive customers of the Italian car manufacturer, as well as to test all the solutions that Ferrari would apply in future years to its series models. Other than that, the FXX also served as a laboratory to perfect the knowledge gained in competitions and to deepen the technologies without the constraints of the regulations of the same or those of the various homologations, both sports and road.

=== 2008: FXX Evoluzione ===
The program evolved with new updates. Engine, gearbox, mechanics and components by suppliers were modified. The evolution was intended to test the new technologies developed by the car manufacturer during its activity in Formula One.

=== 2010: 599XX and 599XX Evo ===
The program continued with a new prototype developed on the Ferrari 599 sports car. The Ferrari 599XX is however a prototype that has little in common with the production model from which it derives and adopts new solutions almost exclusively all derived from Formula One. In general, the car was used to develop active aerodynamic solutions in the rear and air flow management systems in order to increase dynamic capabilities on the track.

=== 2014: FXX-K ===
In 2014, the FXX program reached a new important evolutionary step with the release of the Ferrari FXX-K based on the LaFerrari. The prototype is the first Ferrari car model that adopts a hybrid-type propulsion system using HY-KERS technology. The FXX-K therefore contains all the Ferrari solutions developed in its experiences in the GT series, Endurance racing and Formula One competitions.

=== 2023: SF90 XX Stradale ===
In 2023, the first road legal XX car was introduced with the release of the Ferrari SF90 XX Stradale, based on the Ferrari SF90 Stradale.
