= Grand Prix de la Marne =

Motor race near Reims, France

(France) Grand Prix de la Marne
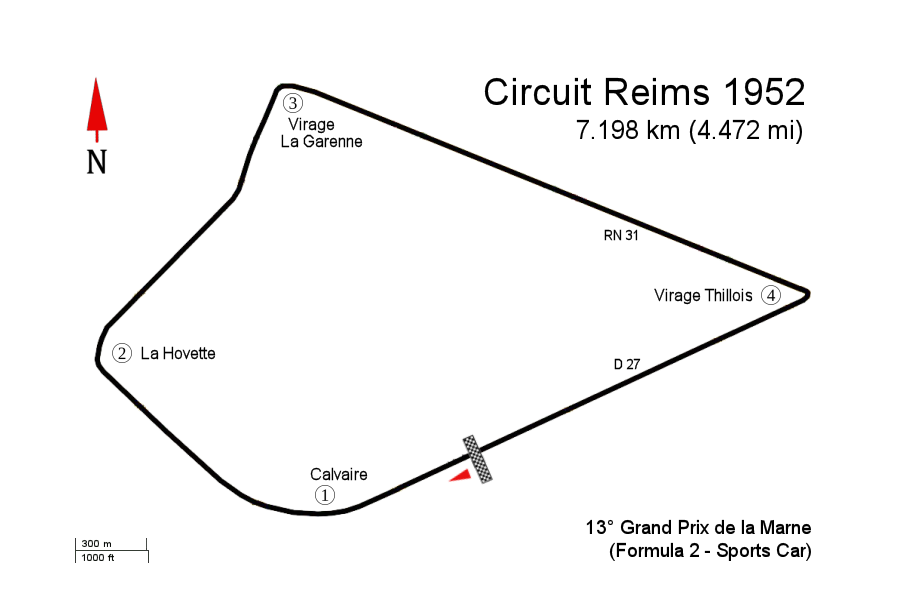

Grand Prix de la Marne
- Venue: Circuit de Reims-Gueux
- Location: Reims, France; 49°15′14.67″N 3°55′50.02″E
- Corporate sponsor: A. C. de Champagne
- First race: 1925 Circuit Beine-Nauroy
- First Gueux race: 1926
- Last race: 1952 Gueux
- Distance: 509.905 km
- Laps: 71
- Duration: 3 hours
- Most wins (driver): (France) Philippe Étancelin (3)
- Most wins (team): (France) Ettore Bugatti
- Most wins (manufacturer): (France) Bugatti (9)

Circuit information
- Surface: Asphalt
- Length: 7.826 km (4.863 mi)
- Turns: 8
- Lap record: 2'28.2 ( (France) Jean Behra, (France) Gordini T16, 1952, Formula 2)

The Grand Prix de la Marne (commonly known as the Marne Grand Prix) was a motor race organized by the Automobile Club de Champagne and staged at the circuit Reims-Gueux on public roads located 7.5 km (4.7 mi) west of the city of Reims in the Marne département of north-eastern France. It proved to be one of the fastest and most prestigious road races in Europe.

== History ==
The origins of motor racing in the Marne district of the Champagne region date to 1912/1913 motorcycle competitions held on a 225 km (140 mi) road course referred to as the Circuit de la Champagne à Reims near the town of Sarcy (about 20 km (12 mi) west-south-west of Reims).

The first race for automobiles was held on August 2, 1925 at the 20 km Circuit de Beine-Nauroy (approximately 10 km south-east of Reims near the Reims-Prunay airport on road D-931). In 1926, the Grand Prix moved to the Reims-Gueux circuit, starting an annual series to run un-interrupted until 1931. By 1932, the popularity and success of the race prompted the French Automobile Club to host the French Grand Prix (billed as the XVIII Grand Prix de l'ACF) at the then 7.826 km (4.9 mi) circuit. The French GP returned in 1938 / 1939 under grand prix regulations, two Formula 1 non-championship rounds in 1948 and 1949 and from the inaugural 1950 Formula 1 championship season for another eleven editions at various years until 1966.

Except for the 1926 Coupe d'Or (the first 12 hrs of Reims), the 1932 Grand Prix de France at Reims was the first major race not billed as the Grand Prix de la Marne even though a few contemporary sources and regional interest continued to refer to the ACF sanctioned Grand Prix de France as "Grand Prix de la Marne". Various race name and numbering systems are still in use today. A typical example among the editions published under different race names and/or numbers is the 1952 Grand Prix: XIII Grand Prix de la Marne (F2 Register), (Stats F1) - XX Grand Prix de la Marne" (GEL Motorsport Information Page) - Grand Prix de France - GP de Reims (sports car) 1952 (Amis de Circuit Gueux).

The last Grand Prix de la Marne was held in 1937, effectively ending the series except for a final edition in 1952.

== Grand Prix de la Marne time line ==
1925
1926–1927
1928–1935
1935–1937
1952

Grand Prix de la Marne - Circuit Beine-Nauroy
Grand Prix de la Marne - Circuit Reims-Gueux
Grand Prix de la Marne - Circuit Reims-Gueux
Grand Prix de la Marne - Circuit Reims-Gueux
Grand Prix de la Marne - Circuit Reims

Formula Libre
Formula Libre
Grand Prix
Sports car
Formula 2

== The Grand Prix de la Marne by year ==
Legend:

Formula Libre = FL - Grand Prix = GP - Voiturette = VT - Sports car = SC - Formula 2 = F2

Year	Date	Event	Reg.	Winner	Constructor / Car	Circuit	Laps	Time	km/h av.	Report
1925	Aug. 2	1° GP de la Marne	FL	(France) Pierre Clause	Bignan	22 km	10	2:08:56.4	104.20 km/h	Report
1926	July 25	2° GP de la Marne	FL	(France) François Lescot	Bugatti T35B 2L C	7.816 km	40	2:50:15.6	112.77 km/h	Report
1927	July 10	3° GP de la Marne	FL	(France) Philippe Étancelin	Bugatti T35B	7.816 km	50	3:26:20.2	116.32 km/h	Report
1928	July 8	4° GP de la Marne	GP	(Monaco) Louis Chiron	Bugatti T35	7.816 km	50	3:00:47.4	132.75 km/h	Report
1929	July 7	5° GP de la Marne	GP	(France) Philippe Étancelin	Bugatti 35C	7.816 km	50	2:54:14.6	137.74 km/h	Report
1930	June 29	6° GP de la Marne	GP	(France) René Dreyfus	Bugatti T35B	7.816 km	50	2:49:27.6	141.626 km/h	Report
1931	July 5	7° GP de la Marne	GP	(France) Marcel Lehoux	Bugatti T51	7.816 km	50	2:47:37.4	143.18 km/h	Report
1931	July 5	7° GP de la Marne	VT	(France) Philippe Auber	Bugatti T37A	7.816 km	50	3:19:00.4	120.588 km/h	Report
1932		XVIII Grand Prix de l'ACF								
1933	July 2	8° GP de la Marne	GP	(France) Philippe Etancelin	Alfa Romeo Monza	7.826 km	51	2:45:12.4	145.0 km/h	Report
1934	July 8	9° GP de la Marne	GP	(Monaco) Louis Chiron	Alfa Romeo Tipo B	7.826 km	64	3:25:51.8	146.0 km/h	Report
1935	July 7	10° GP de la Marne	GP	(France) René Dreyfus	Alfa Romeo Tipo B	7.826 km	64	2:57:52.8	157.760 km/h	Report
1935	July 7	10° GP de la Marne	SC	(France) Albert Perrot	Delahaye 18CV T-138	7.826 km	64	1:29:22.0	131.340 km/h	Report
1936	July 5	11° GP de la Marne	SC	(France) Jean-Pierre Wimille	Bugatti 57G Tank	7.826 km	51	2:50:45.3	140.245 km/h	Report
1937	July 18	12° GP de la Marne	SC	(France) Jean-Pierre Wimille	Bugatti T59	7.826 km	63	3:23:58.4	145.030 km/h	Report
1938–1951		Grand Prix de l'ACF (1938–1939 - GP), (1948–1949 - F1 non-championship), (1950–1951 - F1)								
1952	June 29	13° GP de la Marne	F2	(France) Jean Behra	Gordini T16	7.152 km	71	3 hrs	169.935 km/h	Report

== Circuits by years ==
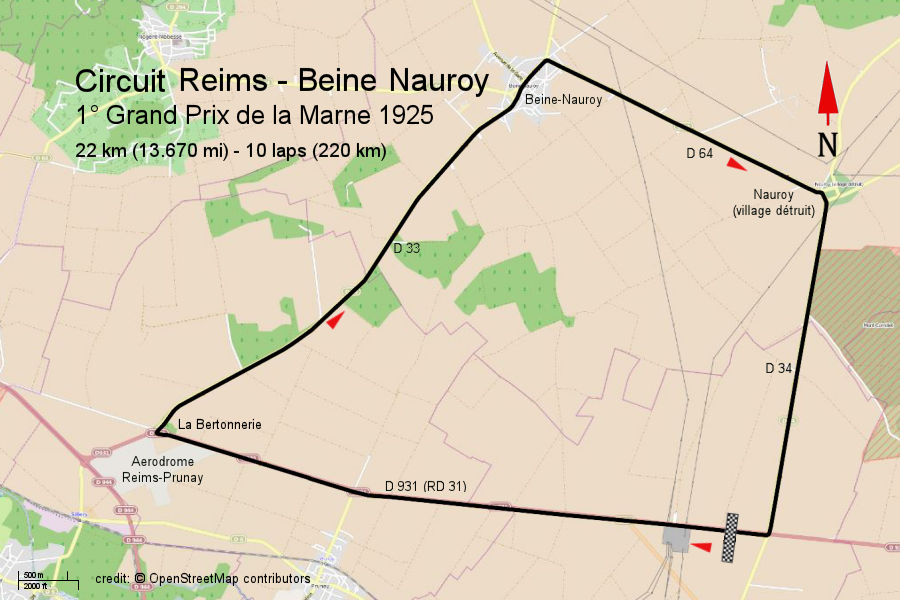
Street Map - Reims - Beine-Nauroy 1925

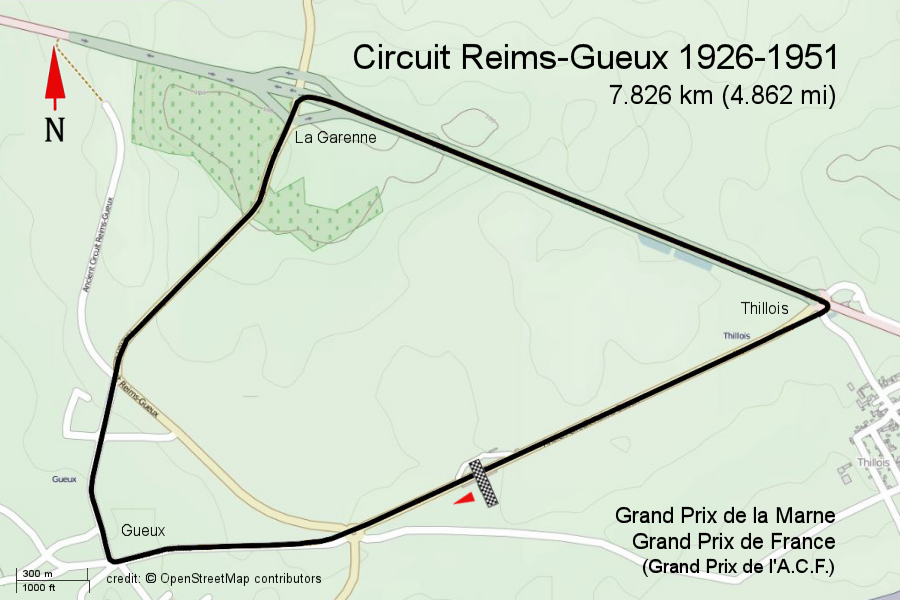
Street Map - Reims Gueux 1926-1951

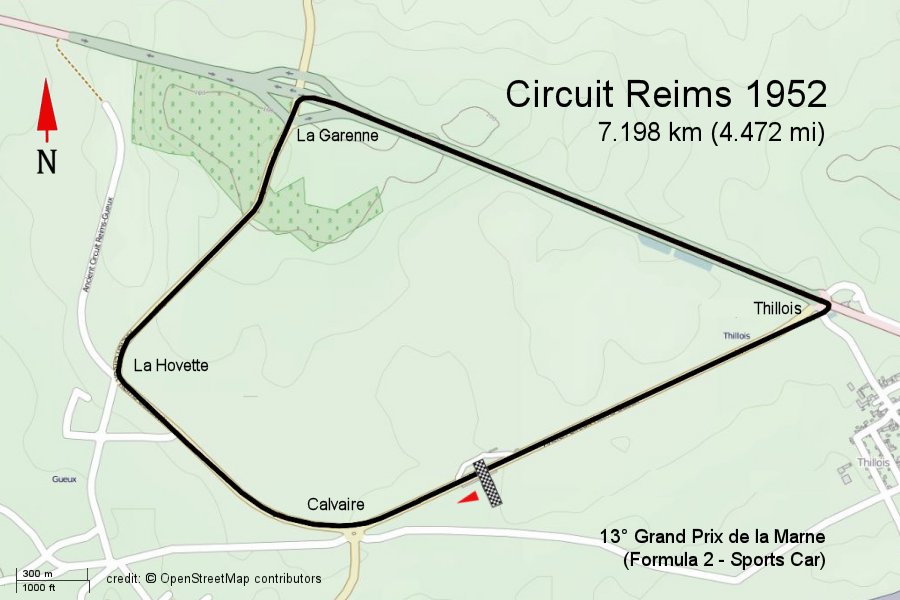
Street Map - Reims- 1952
