= Alpine A330 =

The Alpine A330 was an open-wheel Formula 3 race car, designed, developed and built by French racing team and constructor Renault Alpine in 1967, and competed in motor racing between 1968 and 1969.

In 1968 Alpine built another Formula 3 racing car. The vehicle was considered easy to control and had a short chassis based on a simple space frame. In 1968, the Alpine A330 was the only Formula 3 car (apart from cars from Eastern Europe) not to have a Ford engine in the rear. The in-house engine developed by Alpine in Dieppe had an output of 115 hp and was 10 to 15 hp less than the competition from Ford.

For Alpine, the Formula France, the French Formula 3 Championship, was an absolute priority. The further development of the cars was slowed down by a tight budget, but Patrick Depailler still achieved three second places and several places in the points, thus proving the quality of the small racing car.

In 1969 the car was still used in parallel with the new Alpine A360. Depailler finished fourth in the French Championship driving the A330, one place behind teammate Jean-Pierre Jabouille, who drove the A360.
