= 1937 Campbell Trophy =

Coordinates: 51°21′5.5″N 0°28′9.5″W

1937 Campbell Trophy Grand Prix
- Layout of the Brooklands circuit

Race details
- Date: 1 May 1937
- Official name: I Campbell Trophy
- Location: Brooklands; Weybridge, United Kingdom
- Course: Permanent racing facility
- Course length: 3.648 km (2.267 miles)
- Distance: 100 laps, 364.8 km (226.7 miles)
- Weather: Dry

Pole position
Driver	(United Kingdom) Peter Walker	P. Whitehead
- Time: 1:52.2

Fastest lap
Driver	(United Kingdom) Richard Penn, 5th Earl Howe and (United Kingdom) Raymond Mays	ERA; ERA
- Time: 1:53.0

Podium
First	(Thailand) Prince Bira	Prince Chula of Siam
Second	(United Kingdom) Teddy Rayson	E. Rayson
Third	(United Kingdom) Anthony Powys-Lybbe	A. Powys-Lybbe

The 1937 Campbell Trophy (formally known as I Campbell Trophy) was a Grand Prix that was held on 1 May 1937 at Brooklands near Weybridge, United Kingdom. It was the fourth round of the 1937 Grand Prix season, but it did not count towards the championship. The race, contested over 100 laps of 3.65 km, was won in the Class over 1500cc by Prince Bira, the only non-British driver in this event, driving a Maserati 8CM after starting from fourth position on the grid. The victory in the 1500cc Class was taken by Teddy Rayson, driving a Maserati 4C.

== Entries ==
No.	Driver	Entrant	Car	DNA/DNS
1500cc Class
1	(United Kingdom) Bill Humphreys	B. Humphreys	MG	DNA - rear axle
2	(Thailand) Prince Bira	"B Bira"	Delage	DNA - car not ready
3	(United Kingdom) Arthur Dobson	A.C. Dobson	ERA B-Type	
4	(United Kingdom) Ian Connell	I. Connell	ERA B-Type	
5	(United Kingdom) Reggie Tongue	R. Tongue	ERA B-Type	
6	(United Kingdom) Denis Scribbans	D. Scribbans	ERA B-Type	
7	(United Kingdom) Peter Walker	P. Whitehead	ERA B-Type	
7	(United Kingdom) Peter Whitehead	P. Whitehead	ERA B-Type	DNS - Walker started in his car
8	(United Kingdom) Earl Howe	Earl Howe	ERA B-Type	
9	(United Kingdom) Raymond Mays	H.W. Cook	ERA B-Type	
10	(United Kingdom) Patrick Fairfield	H.W. Cook	ERA	DNS - brake problems
11	(United Kingdom) Andrew Leitch	Hon P. Aitken	Maserati	DNA
12	(United Kingdom) Peter Aitken	Hon P. Aitken	Maserati 6CM	
14	(United Kingdom) Robin Hanson	Mrs. M.E. Hall-Smith	Maserati 6CM	
15	(United Kingdom) Teddy Rayson	E. Rayson	Maserati 4CM	
16	(United Kingdom) Mrs Gwenda Hawkes	Mrs G. Hawkes	Derby	DNA
17	(United Kingdom) "Jack" Bartlett	J. Bartlett	Alta	DNA
18	(United Kingdom) Philip Jucker	P. Jucker	Alta	
18	(United Kingdom) Alan Sinclair	P. Jucker	Alta	DNS - Jucker started in his car
Class over 1500cc (Voiturette class)
19	(United Kingdom) Charlie Dodson	F.W. Dixon	Dixon-Riley Special	
20	(United Kingdom) Cyril Mervyn White	C. Mervyn White	Bugatti T51	
21	(United Kingdom) Anthony Powys-Lybbe	A. Powys-Lybbe	Alfa Romeo Monza	
22	(United Kingdom) Anthony Hamilton	A. Hamilton	Alfa Romeo Monza	
23	(United Kingdom) Wilkie Wilkinson	R.C. Fleming	Alfa Romeo Monza	
24	(United Kingdom) Christopher Staniland	C. Staniland	Alfa Romeo Tipo B	
25	(United Kingdom) Charles Brackenbury	C.E.C. Martin	Alfa Romeo Tipo B	
26	(United Kingdom) Kenneth Evans	K. Evans	Alfa Romeo Tipo B	
26	(United Kingdom) "Bill" Everitt	K. Evans	Alfa Romeo Tipo B	DNS - Evans started in his car
27	(Thailand) Prince Bira	Prince Chula of Siam	Maserati 8CM	
28	(United Kingdom) Francis Ashby	A.F. Ashby	Alfa Romeo Tipo B	
29	(United Kingdom) Austin Dobson	Hon P. Aitken	Alfa Romeo Bimotore	
29	(United Kingdom) Austin Dobson	Hon P. Aitken	Maserati	DNS - He started in another car

== Qualifying results ==
Pos.	Driver	Car Constructor	Time
1	Peter Walker	ERA	1:52.2
2	Earl Howe	ERA	1:52.2
3	Chris Staniland	Alfa Romeo	1:52.3
4	Prince Bira	Maserati	1:53.0
5	Raymond Mays	ERA	1:54.2
6	Austin Dobson	Alfa Romeo	1:56.6
7	Charles Brackenbury	Alfa Romeo	1:57.2
8	Arthur Dobson	ERA	1:57.6
9	Anthony Powys-Lybbe	Alfa Romeo	1:57.6
10	Denis Scribbans	ERA	1:57.8
11	Ian Connell	ERA	2:00.4
12	Teddy Rayson	Maserati	2:00.4
13	Marquis de Belleroche (Took over from Anthony Hamilton in this session)	Alfa Romeo	2:01.0
14	Wilkie Wilkinson	Alfa Romeo	2:01.0
15	Kenneth Evans	Alfa Romeo	2:01.0
16	Charlie Dodson	Dixon Spl.	2:02.8
17	Cyril Mervin White	Bugatti	2:04.0
18	Francis Ashby	Alfa Romeo	2:07.2
19	Peter Aitken	Maserati	2:08.0
20	Philip Jucker	Alta	2:08.2
21	Reggie Tongue	ERA	No Time
22	Robin Hanson	Maserati	No Time

- Drivers shown in cursive drove in the 1500cc class.

== Race report ==
At the start of the race, Aitken stalled his Maserati, so it was pushed away to be started elsewhere. After just one lap, Bira had taken the lead followed by Howe and Walker. However, Walker's engine stopped and, after eight laps, his gearbox broke, so he retired. Likewise did Mays (brake problems) and Dodson (overheated engine).

Bira kept the lead until Howe, who celebrated his fifty-third birthday on this day, overtook him in the nineteenth lap. However, six laps later Howe hit an earth bank on the Vickers bridge and the front of the car hit the palisade. The car then bounced to the other side of the track and ended up on its right side. Howe suffered injuries on the head, arm, shoulder and ribs.

At this point Bira was again first, with Austin Dobson and Rayson behind him, until Dobson's clutch broke in the thirty-first lap. Staniland fell back due to brake problems, as did Arthur Dobson, who had a cup of tea while his mechanics changed the front brake shoes on his ERA. He eventually retired. As for drivers changes, during the fuel stops Jack Duller took over from Ashby, Mays switched seats with Fairfield, as did Fleming with Wilkinson and Hamilton went on in De Belleroche's car.

After eighty laps eleven drivers had retired. Among the last was Evans who had to park his Alta at Hill Bend without brakes and with broken transmission. Bira eventually won the race over two and a half minutes in front of Rayson, who took victory in the voiturette 1500cc class, and Powys-Lybbbe became third.

== Race results ==
Pos.	Driver	Car Constructor	Time (Diff.)/Status
1	Prince Bira	Maserati	3:16:52.6
2	Teddy Rayson	Maserati	+2:36.8
3	Anthony Powys-Lybbe	Alfa Romeo	+8:01.2
4	Denis Scribbans	ERA	+10:14.4
5	Charles Brackenbury	Alfa Romeo	+1 lap
6	Reggie Tongue	ERA	+2 laps
7	Francis Ashby/Jack Duller	Alfa Romeo	+4 laps (DNF - engine)
8	Raymond Mays/Patrick Fairfield	ERA	+8 laps
9	Cyril Mervyn White	Bugatti	+9 laps
10	Robin Hanson	Maserati	+9 laps
11	Chris Staniland	Alfa Romeo	+21 laps (DNF - brakes/clutch)
12	Wilkie Wilkinson/R.C. Fleming	Alfa Romeo	+26 laps (DNF - gearbox)
13	Kenneth Evans	Alfa Romeo	+30 laps (DNF - transmission)
14	Ian Connell	ERA	+31 laps
15	Peter Aitken	Maserati	+52 laps (DNF - fuel feed)
16	Marquis de Belleroche/Anthony Hamilton	Alfa Romeo	+56 laps (DNF - engine)
17	Philip Jucker	Alta	+57 laps (DNF - supercharger)
18	Arthur Dobson	ERA	+68 laps (DNF - brakes)
19	Austin Dobson	Alfa Romeo	+69 laps (DNF - transmission)
20	Earl Howe	ERA	+75 laps (DNF - crash)
21	Charlie Dodson	Dixon-Riley	+89 laps (DNF - clutch)
22	Peter Walker	ERA	+92 laps (DNF - gearbox)

- Drivers shown in cursive drove in the 1500cc class.

== Sources ==
- The Golden Era of Grand Prix Racing - 1937 Campbell Trophy (Archived 2013-07-13)
- Racing Sports Cars - Drivers. The page of each of the aforementioned drivers was consulted. (Archived 2013-07-13)
- The Golden Era of Grand Prix Racing - Drivers. The page of each of the aforementioned drivers was consulted.
