= Robert Mazaud =

French racing driver (1906–1946

- Born: Robert Marcel Mazaud; 4 August 1906 Le Havre, France
- Died: 28 July 1946 (aged 39) Nantes, France

Robert Mazaud, also known as René Mazaud (4 August 1906 – 28 July 1946), was a French racing driver and Résistance member.

== Career ==
Mazaud's career started in the late 1930s, breaking out in 1938 using his own Delahaye 135 CS; he finished 7th at the Mille Miglia with Julio Quinlin, and 2nd at the Formule Libre 1938 Grand Prix des Frontières at Chimay, in Belgium. Mazaud made his 24 Hours of Le Mans debut with Marcel Mongin in the Delahaye, although the duo retired; a month earlier, Mazaud had taken the Delahaye to a win in the first Grand Prix of Antwerp, run over 81 laps of just under 4 miles each to a sportscar formula; Mazaud let two other drivers fight for the lead until both hit mechanical problems - his win was rated as a "nicely judged piece of work."

In 1939, Mazaud added Grand Prix racing to his programme; he finished 6th at the Pau Grand Prix and 5th at the Belgian Grand Prix, and, teamed again with Mongin, led for a long time in the 1939 24 Hours of Le Mans, only for the Delahaye to catch fire just before half-distance. For the German and Swiss Grands Prix, Mazaud joined Lucy O'Reilly Schell's Ecurie Bleue, which used a similar Delahaye. Mazaud finished 5th in the former race, but did not make it out of the heat in the latter, so missed the Grand Prix itself.

During the Second World War, Mazaud worked deep undercover supplying transport equipment and fuel to William Grover-Williams and Robert Benoist for their Special Operations Executive missions; indeed he had concealed his activities so well that, after the war, other drivers initially refused to race him due to their belief that he had been collaborating, until Jean-Pierre Wimille confirmed the truth. Mazaud's racing career continued with Reilly O'Schell's team, now called Ecurie Franco-Americaine and using Maserati 4CLs. The highlight was a 3rd place in the 1946 René le Bègue Cup at Saint Cloud in June, but at the end of July, Mazaud was killed in an accident at the Grand Prix of Nantes, trying to avoid Louis Gérard who had lost control of his Maserati 8CM. Gérard, who ignored a later black flag, temporarily lost his racing licence as a result.

== European Championship Grands Prix ==
(key)

| Year | Entrant | Chassis | Engine | 1 | 2 | 3 | 4 |
|---|---|---|---|---|---|---|---|
| 1939 | R. Mazaud/Ecurie Bleue | Delahaye 135 CS | Delahaye 3.0 straight six | BEL; 5 | FRA – | GER; 6 | SUI; DNQ |

== Le Mans results ==
| Year | Team | Co-Drivers | Car | Class | Laps | Pos. | Class Pos. |
|---|---|---|---|---|---|---|---|
| 1938 | (France) Joseph Paul | (France) Marcel Mongin | Delahaye 135 S | 5.0 | 50 | ret | ret |
| 1939 | (France) R. Mazaud | (France) Marcel Mongin | Delahaye 135 S | 5.0 | 115 | ret | ret |
