= Ian Connell =

Ian Connell may refer to:

- Ian Connell (racing driver) (1913–2003), British racing driver who appeared in a number of Grands Prix either side of the Second World War
- Ian Connell (cricketer) (born 1974), Australian former cricketer who played once for the Tasmania cricket side
