= Wolanowski =

Wolanowski is a Jewish Polish surname. Notable people with the surname include:

- Lucjan Wilhelm Wolanowski (1920–2006), Polish journalist
- Majer Wolanowski (1844–1900)
