= Taso Mathieson =

British racing driver

T.A.S.O. Mathieson
- Born: Thomas Alastair Sutherland Ogilvie Mathieson; 25 July 1908; Glasgow, Scotland
- Died: 12 October 1991 (aged 83); Vichy, France
- Spouse: Mila Parély (m. 1947)

24 Hours of Le Mans career
- Years: 1938 – 1939, 1949 - 1950
- Teams: Norbert Jean Mahé; Luigi Chinetti; Mrs. R.P. Hichens; H.J. Aldington
- Best finish: 9th (1950)
- Class wins: 1 (1950)

Thomas Alastair Sutherland Ogilvie ('Taso') Mathieson (25 July 1908, Glasgow – 12 October 1991, Vichy), stylised as T.A.S.O. Mathieson and sometimes referred to as Donald Mathieson, was a British racing driver and author of automotive history books.

== Racing career and personal life ==
'Taso' was the son of Thomas Ogilvie Mathieson. His family owned the Scottish hand tool manufacturing company Alexander Mathieson & Sons.

'Taso' Mathieson started racing in 1930, when he entered a race at Brooklands restricted to Lagondas. He established his first victory during an Easter Bank-Holiday BARC Open Meeting on 28 March 1932, driving a supercharged Officine Meccaniche. Over the next two years, he won three races in his Bugatti and broke the lap record for 2-litre cars at Snaefell Mountain Course on the Isle of Man, with an average speed of 72.15 mph (116.11 km/h).

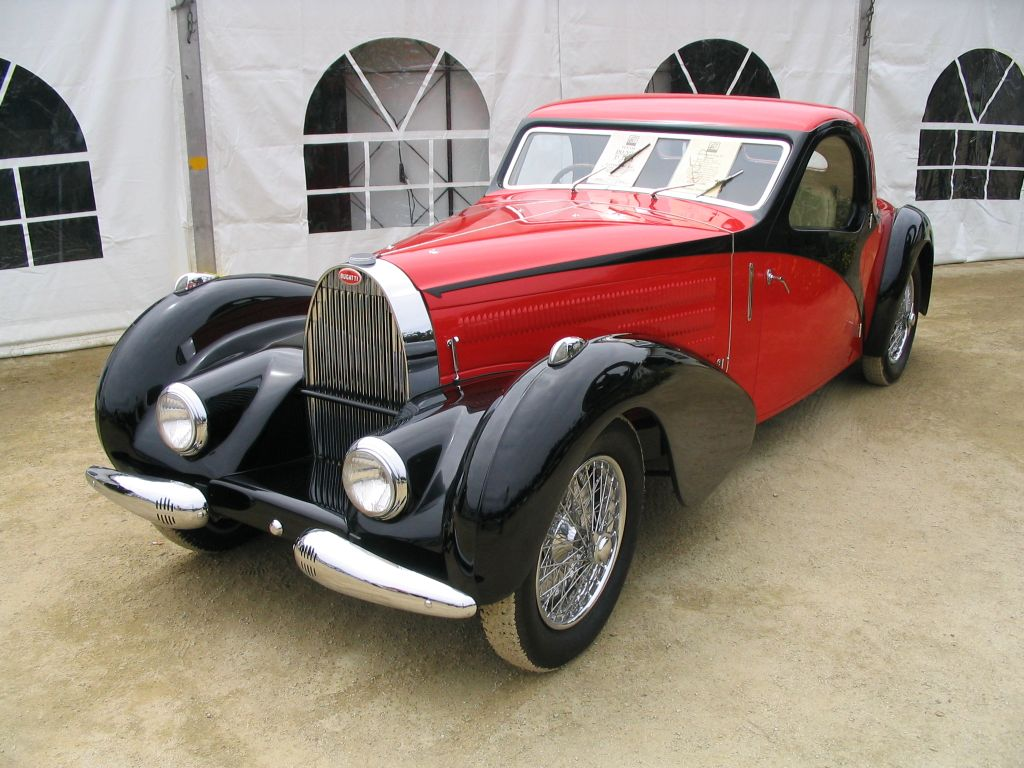
A 1936 Bugatti Type 57 like Mathieson used in 1938

Because of health problems, Mathieson was unable to enter any races from 1934 to 1937, so his Bugatti was driven a few times by Chris Staniland. In 1938 and 1939 he entered the 24 Hours of Le Mans, but both times retired before the finish.

Mathieson was one of the first, if not the first, Briton to race again in Continental Europe after World War II, racing an ex-Henry Birkin 3-litre Maserati in 1946. On 30 May, he raced in the Coupe de la Résistance and retired with an oil leak. He entered the Grand Prix des Frontières on 9 June, but instead raced at the René le Bègue Cup held on the same day, finishing fifth. On 16 June, he attended the Belgian Grand Prix in Brussels, but did not start. He placed sixth in the Roussillon Grand Prix on 30 June, and on 28 July he raced in the Nantes Grand Prix, retiring with engine troubles.

Mathieson entered an ERA E-Type with Leslie Johnson as driver, for 1949 Richmond Trophy, Jersey Road Race and British Empire Trophy, as well as the 1950 British Grand Prix. Some sources attribute these as official ERA entries because Johnson had purchased the car manufacturer three years before. Mathieson bought a 2-litre Frazer Nash Le Mans in which he scored a class victory in the 1950 24 Hours of Le Mans together with Richard "Dickie" Stoop.

He continued racing until 1955, mostly entering Grands Prix in France. When he was injured in a traffic or racing accident, he was forced to retire. After 25 years of racing, Mathieson concentrated on his writing and his collection of photographs, together with his wife Mila Parély, a French actress he had married in 1947. He wrote various authoritative books, including Grand Prix Racing 1906-1914, and wrote several articles in the French magazine Le Fanauto in 1979 and 1980.

== Racing results ==
Year	Date	Race	Entrant	Car	Teammate(s)	Result
1933	14 July	1933 Mannin Moar	T. Mathieson	Bugatti Type 35C	none	DNF
1933	7 October	Donington Park Trophy	T. Mathieson	Bugatti Type 35C	none	DNF
1933	21 October	Mountain Championship	T. Mathieson	Bugatti Type 35C	none	DNF
1938	22 May	Antwerp Grand Prix		Bugatti Type 57		
1938	5 June	Grand Prix des Frontières	TASO Mathieson	Bugatti Type 57	none	3rd
1938	19 June–20	1938 24 Hours of Le Mans		Bugatti Type 57		DNA
1938	19–20 June	1938 24 Hours of Le Mans	Norbert Mahé	Talbot-Lago T150C	Freddy Clifford	DNF (17th)
1938	10 July	24 Hours of Spa		Talbot-Lago T150C		DNA
1938	3 September	RAC Tourist Trophy	TASO Mathieson	Bugatti Type 57	none	20th
1939	28 May	Grand Prix des Frontières	T. Mathieson	Maserati	none	DNA
1939	18 June–19	1939 24 Hours of Le Mans	Luigi Chinetti	Talbot-Lago T26	Luigi Chinetti	DNF (24th)
1939	18 June–19	1939 24 Hours of Le Mans	TASO Mathieson	Talbot 150SS Figoni	Philippe de Massa; Norbert Mahé	DNS *
1946	30 May	Resistance Cup		Maserati 8C		DNF
1946	9 June	1946 René le Bègue Cup		Maserati 8C		5th
1946	16 June	Brussels Grand Prix	TASO Mathieson	Talbot-Lago	none	DNS
1946	30 June	Roussillon Grand Prix		Maserati 8C		6th
1947	13 July	National Gransden (Formula Libre)	John Wyer	HRG	none	DNA
1949	26 June	1949 24 Hours of Le Mans	Mrs. R.P. Hichens	Aston Martin 2-Litre Sports	Pierre Maréchal	DNF (22nd) †
1950	25 June	1950 24 Hours of Le Mans	H.J. Aldington	Frazer Nash Mille Miglia	Richard Stoop	Overall 9th Class 1st
1951	17 June	Circuito do Porto		Frazer Nash Le Mans Replica		9th
1951	12 August	Circuito di Senigallia		Frazer Nash Le Mans Replica		5th
1951	9 September	Targa Florio	TASO Mathieson	Frazer Nash Le Mans Replica	Jacques Pollet	DNF
1952	29 June	Targa Florio		Ferrari 195 S		Overall 6th Class 1st
1953	7 June	12 Hours of Hyères		Maserati A6GCS		
1953	20 June	Roubaix Grand Prix		Maserati A6GCS		6th
1953	28 June	Circuit de Bressuire		Maserati A6GCS		3rd
1953	25 July	Caen Grand Prix	Scuderia della Guestella	Maserati A6GCS	none	4th
Sources:

- Mathieson was the team owner, not a driver.

† Pierre Maréchal was killed in an accident.

=== Complete 24 Hours of Le Mans results ===
Year	Team	Co-Drivers	Car	Class	Laps	Pos.	Class Pos.
1938	(France) Norbert Jean Mahé	(United Kingdom) Freddy Clifford	Talbot T150C	5.0	159	DNF (Fire)	
1939	(Italy) Luigi Chinetti	(Italy) Luigi Chinetti	Talbot T26	5.0	154	DNF (Contact)	
1949	(United Kingdom) Mrs. R.P. Hichens (private entrant)	(France) Pierre Marechal	Aston Martin DB2	S2.0	192	DNF (Accident)	
1950	(United Kingdom) H.J. Aldington (private entrant)	(United Kingdom) Richard "Dickie" Stoop	Frazer Nash Milla Miglia	S2.0	235	9th	1st

=== Complete Targa Florio results ===
Year	Team	Co-Drivers	Car	Class	Laps	Pos.	Class Pos.
1951	(United Kingdom) T.A.S.O. Mathieson	(France) Jacques Pollet	Frazer Nash Le Mans Replica	S+1.1	4	DNF (Engine)	
1952	???	???	Ferrari 195 S Barchetta	S+2.0	8	6th	1st

== Bibliography ==
- Mathieson, T.A.S.O. (1963). A Pictorial Survey of Racing Cars Between the Years 1919 and 1939. Tarporley, GB: Motor Racing Publications, Ltd.
- Mathieson, T.A.S.O. (1965). Grand Prix Racing 1906-1914: A History of the Grand Prix De L'automobile Club De France. Stockholm, SE: Connaisseur Automobile A.B.
