= 1938 Cork Grand Prix =

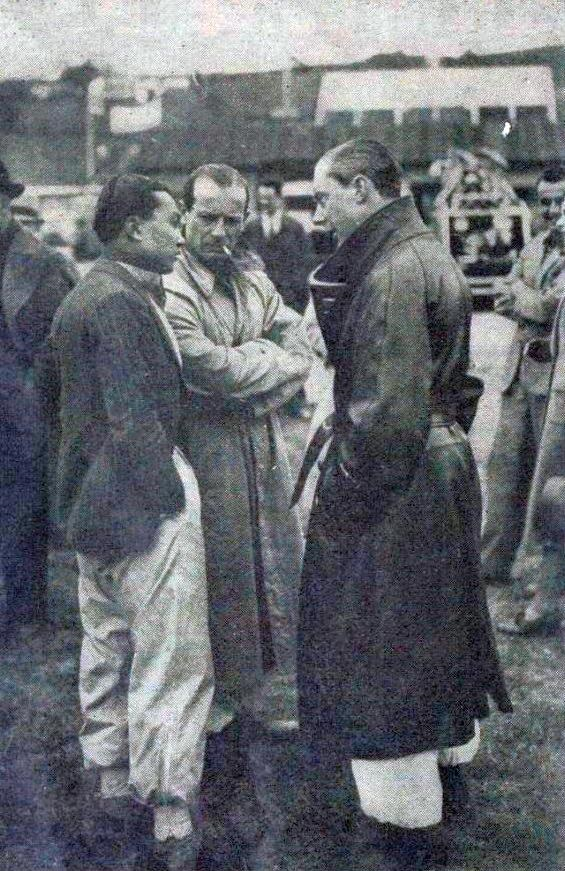
- Prince Bira, Gianfranco Comotti and René Dreyfus pictured at the 1938 Cork Grand Prix

Race details
- Date: 23 April 1938
- Official name: Cork Grand Prix
- Location: Carrigrohane
- Course: Road course
- Course length: 323.3 kilometres (200.9 mi)
- Distance: 33 laps, 9.79 kilometres (6.08 mi)
- Weather: Clear
- Attendance: c. 70,000

Pole position
Driver	(France) René Dreyfus	Ecurie Bleue

Fastest lap
Driver	(France) René Dreyfus	Ecurie Bleue
- Time: 3:49

Podium
First	(France) René Dreyfus	Ecurie Bleue
Second	(Thailand) Prince Bira	Prince Chula
Third	(France) Louis Gerard	Count Heyden

The 1938 Cork Grand Prix was a Grand Prix motor race held at Carrigrohane to the west of Cork city in Ireland on 23 April 1938. The 200-mile race was run over more than 30 laps of a six-mile circuit. It was won by the French driver René Dreyfus in a Delahaye car, with second place going to Prince Bira in a Maserati.

The course ran along the Carrigrohane Straight to Victoria Cross, turned right towards Dennehy's Cross, from there on to Model Farm Road, and west towards eastern outskirts of Ballincollig. This back stretch finished at the Poulavone hairpin bend, before passing "Hell Hole Corner", and back onto the Carrigrohane Straight. The race was watched by an estimated 70,000 spectators, with participants reportedly representing 12 countries.

A collection of photos, relating to the race, is held in University College Cork library as the Cork Motor Derby Collection.

== Classification ==
Pos	No	Driver	Team	Car	Laps	Time/Retired
1	14	(France) René Dreyfus	Ecurie Bleue	Delahaye 145	33	2:09:40
2	20	(Thailand) Prince Bira	Prince Chula of Siam	Maserati 8CM	33	+ 1:50
3	17	(France) Louis Gérard	Count Heyden	Delage 3.0L	30	+ 3 Laps
4	7	(United Kingdom) Kenneth Evans	Alfa Corse	Alfa Romeo Tipo B	30	+ 3 Laps
5	15	(France) Joseph Paul	Count Heyden	Delahaye 135	25	+ 8 Laps
Ret	18	(France) Jean-Pierre Wimille	Automobiles Ettore Bugatti	Bugatti 59/50B	21	Piston
Ret	12	(Italy) Gianfranco Comotti	Ecurie Bleue	Delahaye	12	Oil Leak
Ret	16	(France) Jean Viale	Count Heyden	Delahaye	2	Clutch
