= 1946 René le Bègue Cup =

Race details
- Date: 9 June 1946
- Official name: I Coupe René le Bègue
- Location: Saint-Cloud; Paris, France
- Course: Street circuit
- Course length: 6.002 km (3.729 miles)
- Distance: 30 laps, 180.047 km (111.876 miles)

Pole position
Driver	(France) Raymond Sommer	Maserati
- Time: 2:59.2

Fastest lap
Driver	(Italy) Giuseppe Farina	Alfa Romeo
- Time: 3:08.4

Podium
First	(France) Raymond Sommer	Maserati
Second	(Monaco) Louis Chiron	Talbot-Lago
Third	(France) Robert Mazaud	Maserati

The 1946 René le Bègue Cup was a Grand Prix motor race held at a street course in Saint-Cloud near Paris, France on 9 June 1946.

== Classification ==
Pos	No	Driver	Team	Car	Laps	Time/Retired	Grid
1	3	(France) Raymond Sommer	Scuderia Milano	Maserati 4CL	30	1:38:42.0	1
2	6	(Monaco) Louis Chiron	Automobiles Talbot Darracq	Talbot-Lago T26	30	+17.6	5
3	11	(France) Robert Mazaud	Ecurie Franco-Americaine	Maserati 4CL	29	+1 Lap	6
4	5	(Italy) Arialdo Ruggeri	Scuderia Milano	Maserati 4CL	29	+1 Lap	13
5	21	(United Kingdom) Thomas Mathieson	Private entry	Maserati 8C	28	+2 Laps	9
6	24	(France) Yves Giraud Cabantous (France) Eugène Chaboud	Ecurie France	Delahaye 135S	28	+2 Laps	10 8
7	8	(France) Georges Grignard	Ecurie France	Delahaye 135S	27	+3 Laps	15
8	18	(Netherlands) Eric Verkade	Ecurie Blanche et Noir	Alfa Romeo 8C	27	+3 Laps	17
9	9	(France) Henri Trillaud	Ecurie France	Delahaye 135S	27	+3 Laps	19
10	14	(Italy) Discoride Lanza (France) Maurice Trintignant	Ecurie Tricolore	Maserati 4CL	26	+4 Laps	14
11	23	(France) Charles Pozzi	Ecurie France	Delahaye 135S	26	+4 Laps	18
Ret	1	(France) Jean-Pierre Wimille	Alfa Corse	Alfa Romeo 158	19	Gearbox	2
Ret	2	(Italy) Giuseppe Farina	Alfa Corse	Alfa Romeo 158	15	Gearbox	3
Ret	15	(France) Henri Louveau	Scuderia Automovilistica Milan	Maserati 4CL	14	Shock absorber	7
Ret	4	(Italy) Tazio Nuvolari	Scuderia Milano	Maserati	14	Engine	4
Ret	7	(France) Eugène Chaboud	Ecurie France	Delahaye V12	10	Piston	8
Ret	17	(France) "Raph"	Ecurie Naphtra Course	Maserati 6CM			11
Ret	10	(France) Paul Friderich	Ecurie Blanche et Noir	Delahaye 155			20
Ret	20	(Italy) Enrico Platé	Ecurie Autosport	Maserati 4CL	8		16
Ret	12	(United States) Harry Schell	Ecurie Franco-Americaine	Maserati 6CM	6	Gearbox	12
Ret	28	(France) Eugène Martin	Private entry	Salmson	3	Supercharger	22
Ret	19	(France) Victor-Henri Serve	Private entry	Bugatti Type 35B	1	Magneto	21
DNS	26	(France) Jean Lucas	Ecurie Blanche et Noir	Alfa Romeo 8C			

Grand Prix Race
1946 Grand Prix season
Previous race: None	René le Bègue Cup	Next race: None
