= Lucjan Wolanowski =

Polish writer

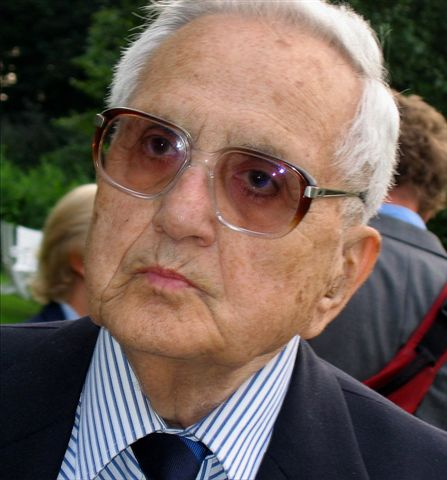
- Lucjan Wolanowski; Warsaw (Poland), September, 2004
- Born: February 26, 1920; Warsaw, Poland
- Died: February 20, 2006 (aged 85); Warsaw, Poland
- Occupations: journalist, translator and traveller
- Partner: Anna-Bożenna Wolanowska (Szumowska) (1924-2016)
- Children: Anna Nathan (b. March 4, 1952)
- Writing career
- Pen name: Wilk; Waldemar Mruczkowski; W. Lucjański; (L.W.); lu; Lu; (lw); WOL.
- Website: lucjanwolanowski.wordpress.com

Lucjan Wilhelm Wolanowski (Lucjan Kon; February 26, 1920 – February 20, 2006), pseudonyms: Wilk; Waldemar Mruczkowski; W. Lucjański; (L.W.); lu; Lu; (lw); WOL., was a Polish journalist, writer and traveller.

== Early life, education, and Second World War ==
Wolanowski was born into an intellectual family in Warsaw, Poland. His father, Henryk Kon, was a lawyer, and his mother, Róża Wolanowska, was the great-granddaughter of Majer Wolanowski (1844–1900), the well-known Polish manufacturer. His sister, Elżbieta (Kon) Wassongowa (1908–2007) was a Polish translator and book editor.

Wolanowski studied chemistry at the Grenoble Polytechnical Institute (France 1938-1939), but the outbreak of World War II caught him during a vacation in his homeland. During World War II he fought as a soldier of the Polish clandestine resistance movement Home Army, and he acted as literary contributor to the Polish underground press.

== Career ==
After the war he worked with the Polish Press Agency (from 1945); he was a commentator from various conferences for journalists in the Foreign Secretary in Warsaw. In this period he met such famous people as Edward R. Murrow, Sydney Gruson, Flora Lewis, Larry Allen, Vicent Buist or Pierre Marechal, who were correspondents in Poland then. He worked as a journalist at the weekly magazine Przekrój (1945–1950); the illustrated weekly Świat (The World, 1951–1969); the magazine Dookoła świata (1969–1976) and with the magazine Magazyn Polski (1976–1988).

He joined a ship-rescue operation in a Norwegian fiord, made a long trip aboard an Icelandic cutter in North Atlantic waters. He went on five trips around the world (1960–1972) and also visited the Pacific region – he visited Australia, Japan, New Zealand, Papua and New Guinea, West Irian, French Polynesia, Fiji, Hong-Kong and Singapore; accredited to the headquarters of the UN Troops in New Guinea during the landing operation (1962–1963); as the US stipendist (he was granted a scholarship United States Department of State - "Program for Leaders"), he belonged to the team of reporters (as the only reporter from the Eastern Bloc) to cover the take off of the space vessel Gemini 5 in 1965 (Cape Kennedy, Florida); he acted as advisor to the World Health Organization Information Department in Geneva, then in a similar capacity at the WHO branches in New Delhi, Bangkok and Manila 1967–1968. He traveled aboard an Australian light-house tender m.v. Cape Moreton, servicing light-houses on the small Coral Sea islands and took part in an Australian whaling expedition. Was rescued by black-trackers during his wanderings across the Kimberley desert.

== Publications ==
He wrote 25 books, translated into 7 languages and depicting mainly his travels. He did not specialize in economics or in politics, but always looked for "the human side of the story" and tried to see for himself the things he was going to write about. All his books are illustrated by pictures he shot himself. He died in Warsaw.

== Organisational affiliations ==
He was a member of the Association of Polish Journalists (1951–1982 and 1991–2006), of the Polish Writers Union (1959–1983), of the Polish PEN Club (1971–2006), of the Association of Polish Writers (1989–2006); former member of the Polish Socialist Party (PPS; 1945–1948), and of the Polish United Workers Party (PZPR; 1948–1980).

== Awards ==
Wolanowski received many awards, including: Order of the Romania Star (1949), Award of the Polish Club of International Publicists (1962); Prize of the Polish Journalists Association for the Best Book of the Year (1973); the Cavalier's Cross of Polonia Restituta; the Golden Cross of Merit; Honorary Citizen of Springfield, United States (1965).

== Works ==
- Ośmiornica (Octopus), 1952 (History of the Unilever Syndicate);
- Przeważnie o ludziach (Mostly about people), 1953;
- Na południe od Babiej Góry (To the East of Babia Góra), 1954 (reports from Czechoslovakia);
- Śladami brudnej sprawy (In the steps of a dirty affair), 1954 (historical reports);
- Czy Stanisław Talarek musiał umrzeć? (Had Stanisław Talarek to die?), 1955 (with Mirosław Azembski);
- Cichy front (The Silent Front), 1955, 1956;
- Dokąd oczy poniosą (To go just anywhere), 1958, 1959 (reports);
- Żywe srebro (Quick-silver), 1959, 1963 (with Henryk Kawka);
- Zwierciadło bogini (The goddess's mirror), 1961, 1962, 1964 (reports from Japan);
- Klejnot korony (The crown jewel), 1963 (report from Hong-Kong);
- Księżyc nad Tahiti (Moon over Tahiti), 1963;
- Dalej niż daleko (Farther than far), 1964 (report from New Zealand);
- Basia nad biegunem (Basia at the pole), 1964 (book for children);
- Ocean nie bardzo spokojny (The not very Pacific Ocean), 1967;
- Poczta do Nigdy-Nigdy (Post to Never-Never Land), 1968, 1970, 1972, 1978, 1989 (reports from Australia);
- Z zapartym tchem (Breathtaking reports), 1969;
- Upał i gorączka (Heat and fever), 1970, 1973, 1996;
- Westchnienie za Lapu-Lapu (Longing for Lapu-Lapu), 1973, 1976;
- Min-Min. Mała opowieść o wielkim lądzie (Min-Min. Short story about a Large Land), 1977;
- Walizka z przygodami. Reporter tu, reporter tam (A luggage full of adventures. A reporter at large), 1977;
- Buntownicy Mórz Południowych. Reporter na tropie buntu na Okręcie Jego Królewskiej Mości "Bounty" (The mutineers of the South Seas. A Reporter on the trail of the Mutiny on HMS "Bounty"), 1980, 1986;
- Ani diabeł, ani głębina. Dzieje odkryć Australii, opowiedziane ludziom, którym się bardzo śpieszy (Neither the devil, nor the deep water. A story of Australia's discovery, told to the people who are in hurry), 1987.

== Image gallery ==
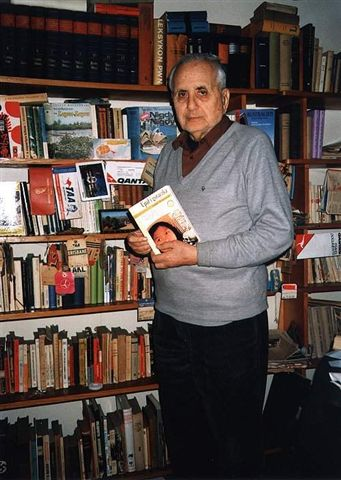
Lucjan Wolanowski, Warsaw, 1998

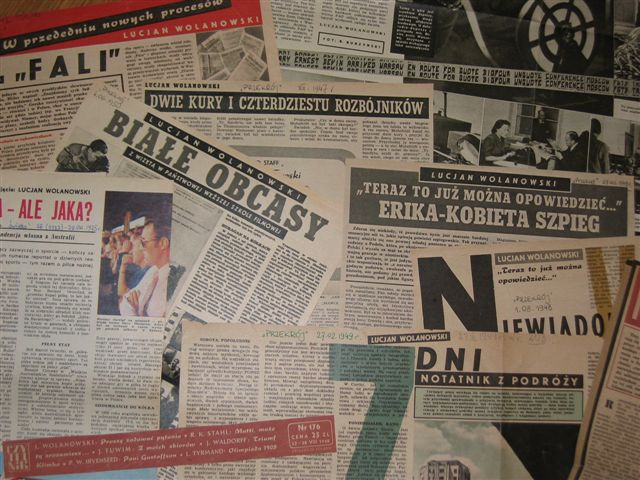
Articles of Wolanowski in the Polish newspapers "Przekrój" and "Dookoła świata", 1947 - 1973

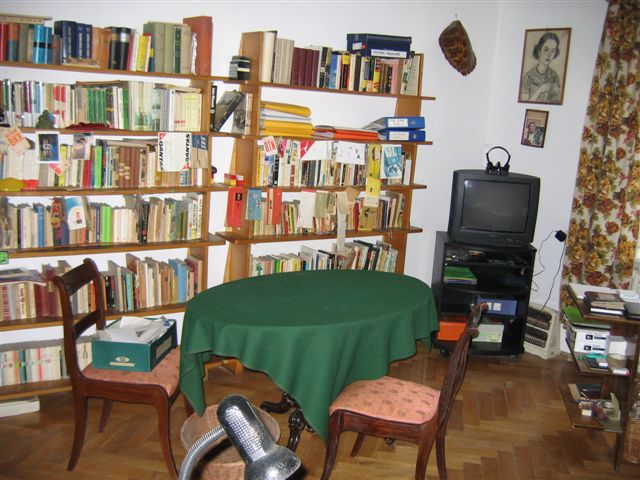
Writer's study, 23 Odolanska Str., Warsaw (Poland), 2005

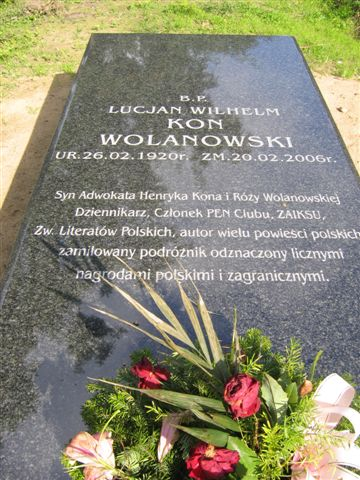
Wolanowski's grave stone, Jewish Cemetery, Warsaw, September 10, 2006

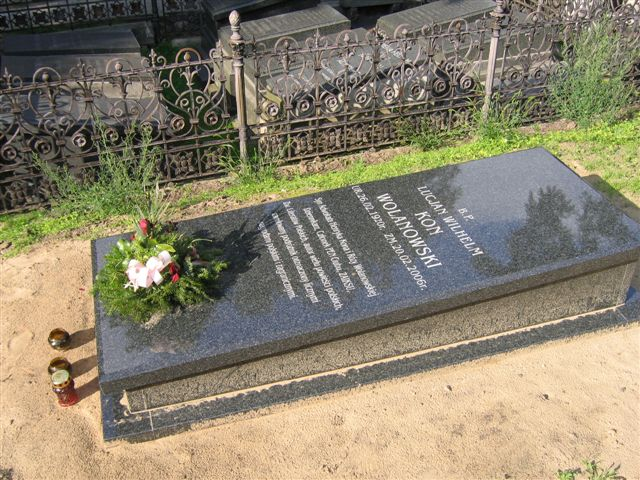
Wolanowski's grave stone, Jewish Cemetery, Warsaw, September 10, 2006
