= Louis Gérard (racing driver) =

French racing driver (born 1899)

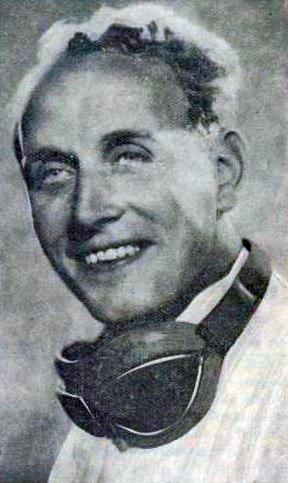
- Gérard, second in the 1939 24 Hours of Le Mans
- Born: April 16, 1899; Arras, France
- Died: May 11, 2000 (aged 101); Saint-Cyr-sur-Mer, France
- Occupation: Racing driver
- Years active: 1937–1951

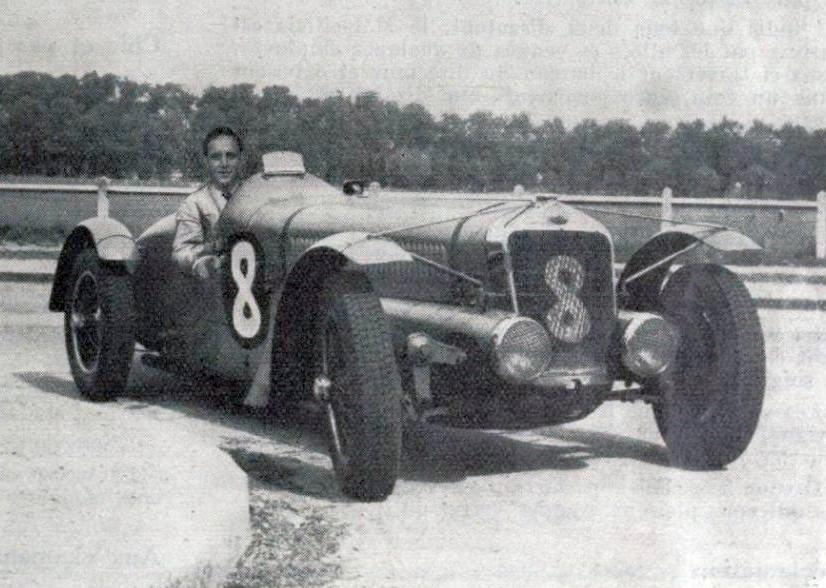
Louis Gérard, winner of the RAC Tourist Trophy in 1938 in a Delage D6-70.

Louis Gustave Adolphe Gérard (16 April 1899 – 11 May 2000) was a French racing driver. Winner of the RAC Tourist Trophy in 1938, he took part in numerous other sports car races and various Grand Prix events between 1937 and 1951. He mainly raced with reliable but moderately powerful Delage cars. Before World War II, he also attempted to drive across Africa from north to south in less than two weeks.

== Biography ==
The second of seven children, Gérard was born in 1899 in Arras (Pas-de-Calais department). During World War I, he joined the army at the age of 17 and served in the heavy artillery. After the war and the end of his military contract, he became a tailor in Paris. He married Marie Yvonne Laurent (1899–1941), with whom he had two children, Jean-Yves and Nicole (future wife of actor Jacques Castelot). He began competing in motor racing in the second half of the 1930s, while he was the owner of slot machines located in Parisian cafés. During World War II, while living in Ferrières (Oise department) in the occupied zone, he was an informant for the Allies and helped organise air raids. He resumed motor racing after the war. At the end of the 1950s, after divorcing his second wife Barbara Raponnet, he married Liliane Françoise Hannedouche (1932–1997), with whom he had a son, Jean-François. He was awarded the Legion of Honour in 1996 for his wartime service. He died in Saint-Cyr-sur-Mer (Var department) in 2000, three years after Liliane.

== Motor racing ==
Gérard's career in motor racing began by chance in 1937, when he was 38 years old. A car enthusiast since he lived in Paris, he was encouraged by his son Jean-Yves to buy a Delage D6-70 3-litre coupé on display on Avenue Victor Emmanuel III. As his income came from slot machines, the purchase was paid for with bags of coins. Shortly afterwards, Gérard was contacted by Jacques de Valence de Minardière, a Delage's agent in Paris, who suggested that he take part in the 24 Hours of Le Mans with the newly acquired car, and offered to be his teammate for the competition. The car had been built for the 1936 24 Hours of Le Mans, which was finally cancelled due to strikes that accompanied the election of the Popular Front in France. Louis Gérard thus took part in the 1937 24 Hours of Le Mans with Jacques de Valence as teammate. The pair finished the race in fourth place.

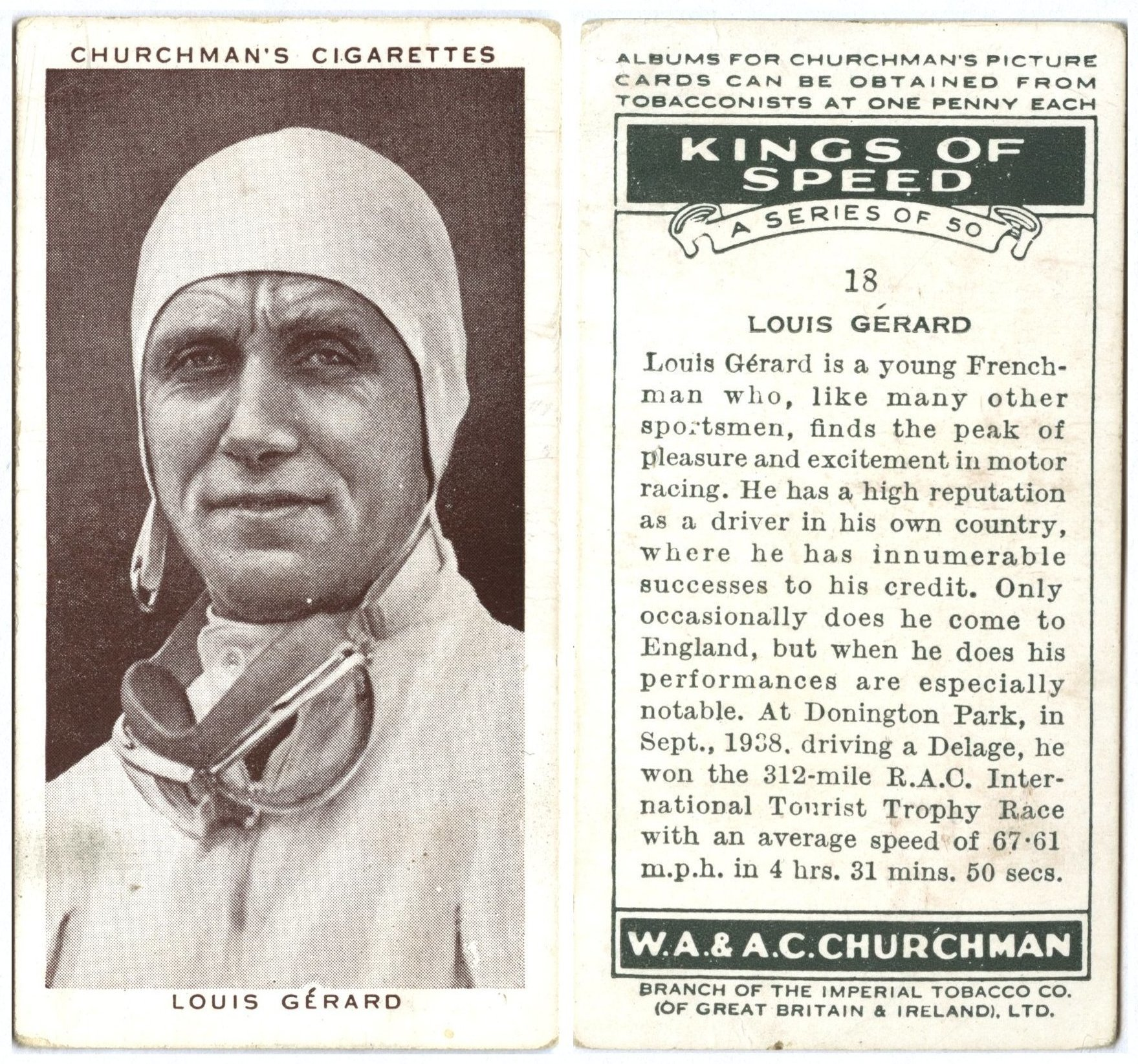
Front and back of a card published by Churman's Cigarettes in 1939.

After the 24 Hours of Le Mans, Gérard continued to race with his own Delage, which was redesigned by Figoni to become an open two-seater racing car at the end of 1937. In April 1938, he finished third in the Cork Grand Prix. In May of the same year, he finished second in the Antwerp Grand Prix after breaking the lap record. In July, with Georges Monneret as teammate, he finished second in the Spa 24 Hours despite terrible weather conditions. In September 1938, in persistent rain, he won the RAC Tourist Trophy organised by the Royal Automobile Club of England at the Donington circuit.

Noticed by Enzo Ferrari during the 1938 Spa 24 Hours, Gérard was contacted by him to become an official Alfa Romeo driver the following year. In addition, his victory at Donington earned him an invitation to participate in the East London Grand Prix and Grosvenor Grand Prix held in South Africa in January 1939. As both races were reserved for single-seater cars, and in light of Enzo Ferrari's proposal, Gérard exchanged his two-seater Delage for a Maserati 6CM. Unfortunately, once in South Africa with this car in January 1939, he was forced to withdraw from both Grand Prix due to mechanical problems. Furthermore, during the same period, Mussolini formally prohibited Enzo Ferrari from hiring a foreign driver.

After these events, Gérard became the lead driver for the Walter Watney team, newly created by Louis Delâge’s partner. He thus competed in several races with one or other of the team's two Delage D6 3-litre cars before the outbreak of World War II. It was in one of these cars that he and Georges Monneret took turns during the 1939 24 Hours of Le Mans. The pair led the race for 17 hours; however, due to a minor mechanical problem that resulted in a prolonged pit stop in the 21st hour, the two drivers finished second behind Jean-Pierre Wimille and Pierre Veyron’s Bugatti Type 57.

A week after the 1939 24 Hours of Le Mans, Gérard participated in the Belgian Grand Prix, during which English driver Richard Seaman was killed in an accident. This time, Gérard was at the wheel of a Delahaye T135CS — a car with a slightly larger engine capacity than the Delages of the Watney team, but one he knew could not compete with the much more powerful German cars on the starting grid (namely four Mercedes W154s and four Auto Union Type Ds). The fact is that he finished the Grand Prix in sixth place, behind winner Hermann Lang in a Mercedes, the drivers of the two other German cars still in contention at the race end, Raymond Sommer, who finished fourth in an Alfa Romeo Tipo 308, and Gérard's friend Robert Mazaud, who finished in fifth place in a Delahaye T135CS.

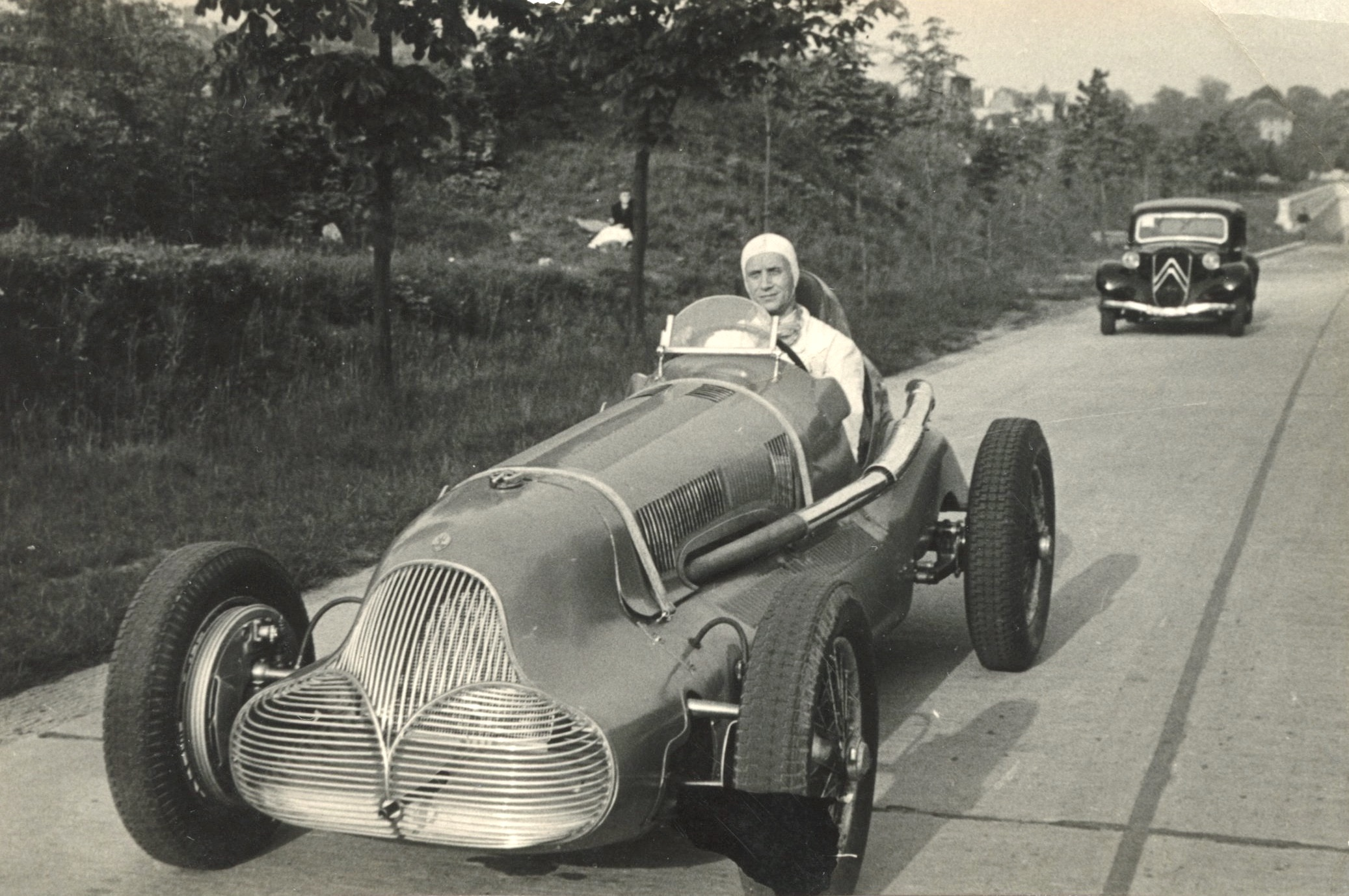
Louis Gérard at the wheel of the Maserati, redesigned by Figoni for the 1946 Indianapolis 500.

Gérard returned to motor racing after World War II. He first competed in Maserati 8CM in the 1945 Coupe des Prisonniers, then in the Indianapolis 500 and Nantes Grand Prix in 1946. During this tragic Grand Prix, a woman was killed among the spectators, and Robert Mazaud also had a fatal accident with his Maserati as he was about to overtake Louis Gérard. Despite testimonies exonerating him, Gérard was deemed partially responsible for Mazaud's accident and had his racing licence temporarily suspended.

Subsequently, Gérard mainly raced in one of the five Delage D6 3‑litre cars built after the war. It was with this Delage that he finished fourth in the 1949 24 Hours of Le Mans with Francisco Godia Sales as teammate. The following year, with the same car, he competed in the Paris Grand Prix, then in the Paris 12 Hours with De Saint Didier as teammate, finishing second in both races. Gérard drove again the 1939 Le Mans Delage twice, first in 1950 at the Coupe du Salon, where he finished second, then in 1951 at the Paris Grand Prix, where, for his last race at the age of 52, he finished eighth behind cars that were newer and more powerful than his own.

== An incomplete crossing of Africa at the end of 1938 ==
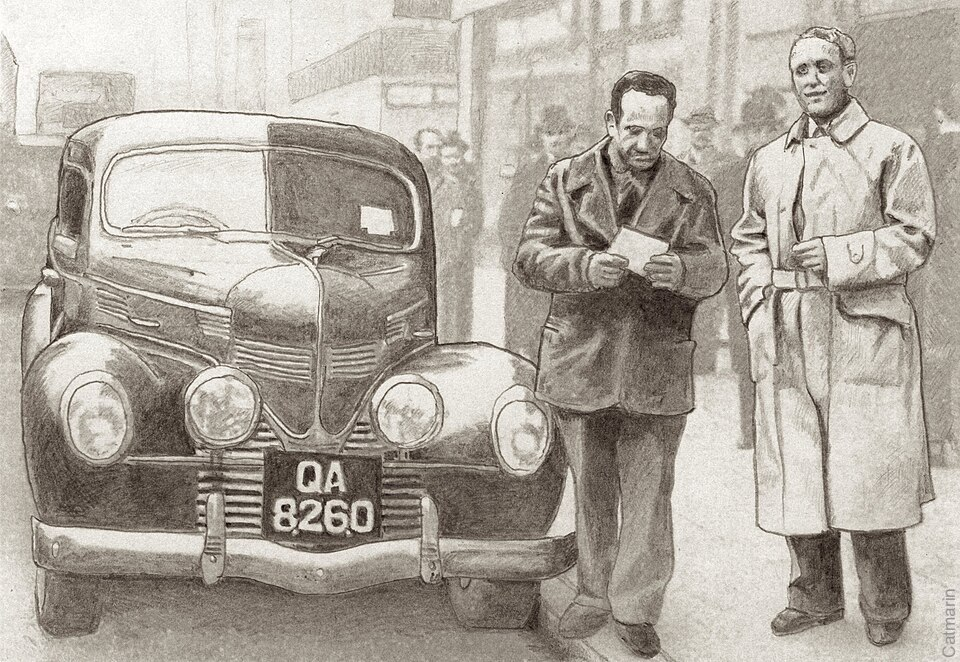
The Dodge, Jack Gleisner and Louis Gérard departing from London in 1938.

Rather than travelling to South Africa by sea (as did the Maserati with which he was going to race there in early January 1939), Gérard joined Englishman Jack Gleisner, who was looking for a teammate to drive from London to Cape Town. The objective was to beat both Gleisner's previous record on the same route (19 days) and the maritime record set in 1936 by the RMMV Stirling Castle (13 days and 9 hours between Southampton and Cape Town). The car trip, reported in newspapers, was carried out using a Dodge D11, the rear of which had been converted into a bunk so that the two drivers could take turns at the wheel. After Algiers and crossing the Sahara via Bidon V, the route passed through Gao in present-day Mali, Kano in northern Nigeria, Fort Archambault (now the city of Sarh) in southern Chad, Nairobi in Kenya, and Mbeya in the south-west of present-day Tanzania. The drive was then to continue via Salisbury in Southern Rhodesia (now Harare in Zimbabwe) and Johannesburg in South Africa.

Gérard and Gleisner crossed the Sahara in 30 hours, setting a new record. However, when leaving Gao, the Dodge took 6 hours to travel 50 km and could only be freed from the mud in which it had become stuck thanks to the intervention of villagers. The large African wildlife provided some thrilling moments between Gao and Nairobi, including a leopard spotted at night during a repair, three lions in no hurry to leave the track where they were lying, and a group of buffaloes surprised by the car's sudden arrival, which resulted in the Dodge having a wing damaged by a headbutt. Nevertheless, the real difficulties encountered on the same section were breakdowns, minor accidents and mechanical problems, requiring either a prolonged stop or driving at low speed over a long distance. Over days, the series of mishaps prevented Gérard and Gleisner from winning their bet, as it took them almost the entire month of December 1938 to cover the three-quarters of the 16,500 km they had to travel to reach Cape Town. Furthermore, the car trip could not be continued beyond Mbeya, as the tracks had become impassable during the rainy season. Louis Gérard finally had to find a plane to complete his journey to South Africa and compete in the East London Grand Prix, without having been able to take part in the trials, and at the wheel of a single-seater Maserati that he had never the opportunity to drive before.

== Best results in motor racing ==
Sports car races:

- Winner of the RAC Tourist Trophy in 1938 at Donington in Delage D6-70 3L I6;
- 2nd in the 1938 Antwerp Grand Prix (a sports cars race despite its name) in Delage D6-70 3L I6;
- 2nd in the 1938 Spa 24 Hours in Delage D6-70 3L I6 (with Georges Monneret as teammate);
- 2nd in the 1939 24 Hours of Le Mans in Delage D6 3L (with Georges Monneret as teammate);
- 2nd in the 1948 Coupe du Salon at Montlhéry in Delage D6 3L;
- 2nd in the 1950 Coupe du Salon at Montlhéry in Delage D6 3L;
- 2nd in the Paris 12 Hours in 1950 at Montlhéry in Delage D6 3L (with De Saint‑Didier as teammate);
- 3rd in the 1937 Coupe d'Automne at Montlhéry in Delage D6-70 3L I6;
- 4th in the 1937 24 Hours of Le Mans in Delage D6-70 3L I6 (with Jacques de Valence de Minardière as teammate);
- 4th in the 1949 24 Hours of Le Mans in Delage D6 3L (with Francisco Godia Sales as teammate).

Grands Prix:

- 2nd in the 1950 Paris Grand Prix at Montlhéry in Delage D6 3L;
- 3rd in the 1938 Cork Grand Prix in Delage D6-70 3L I6;
- 4th in the 1939 Comminges Grand Prix in Delage D6 3L;
- 5th in the 1949 Grand Prix du Salon at Montlhéry in Delage D6 3L;
- 5th in the 1950 Rouen Grand Prix in Delage D6 3L;
- 6th in the 1939 Belgian Grand Prix at Spa-Francorchamps in Delahaye T135CS.
