= Ian Connell (racing driver) =

British racing driver (1913–2003)

- Born: Ian Ferguson Connell; 15 October 1913 Singapore
- Died: 1 March 2003 (aged 89) Chippenham, Wiltshire

Ian Ferguson Connell (15 October 1913 – 1 March 2003) was a British Grand Prix racing driver, active either side of the Second World War.

== Career ==
Connell was a member of the Cambridge University Motor Club, and started racing in 1934. He was a regular racer at Brooklands, primarily in MGs, and ran the sales side of the Monaco Garage in Watford.

Connell raced at the 24 Hours of Le Mans twice, finishing 8th as a team-mate to Rob Walker in a Delahaye 135S in the 1939 event, although Connell had to sit out the last 12 hours, having burnt his feet badly due to a broken exhaust.

He drove in one Grande Epreuve before the war, the 1938 Donington Grand Prix, in his E.R.A. B-type, with Peter Monkhouse sharing the driving; the two came 8th and last, massively outgunned by the leading German cars, Connell estimating his top speed at being 135mph while Tazio Nuvolari could touch 200. (Connell had raced in the 1936 Donington Grand Prix, sharing his Alfa Romeo Monza with Kenneth Evans, the duo not finishing, but that race did not have premier status.)

Connell served in the Second World War as an officer in the Desert Rats, heading up a vehicle workshop. He continued racing after the war and enjoyed a full season in 1947, culminating in a 7th place finish at the 1947 French Grand Prix, sharing an E.R.A. Type B with owner Peter Whitehead. He hung up his helmet in 1949, on getting married, and became an accountant, retiring as chief accountant at Decca Radio and Television.

== Le Mans results ==
Year	Team	Co-Drivers	Car	Class	Laps	Pos.	Class Pos.
1935	(United Kingdom) J. F. Connell	(United Kingdom) Nevil Lloyd	Singer Nine	1.1	17	ret	ret
1939	(France) Comte Heyden	(United Kingdom) Rob Walker	Delahaye 135	5.0	224	8th	5th
