= Wilkie Wilkinson =

British mechanic (1903–2001)

- Born: 7 August 1903; London, England
- Died: 20 August 2001 (aged 98); Easenhall Warwickshire
- Other name: Walter Ernest Wilkinson
- Known for: Le Mans Victories, BRM and ERA riding mechanic

Walter Ernest "Wilkie" Wilkinson (7 August 1903 – 2001) was a British mechanic and a founder member of the BRMC (British Racing Mechanics Club).

== Biography ==
He was born in North London on 7 August 1903, the fifth of eight children born to a printer, and entered motor racing in 1929 as a riding mechanic accompanying George Eyston and Giulio Ramponi in the Italian OM team. In 1931, he moved to Bellevue Garage, located in Wandsworth, which was run by Kenneth Evans and his family. It was at Bellevue Garage that Billy Cotton brought his Riley to be "breathed on". Wilkie prepared Cotton's ERA for the 1938 Donington Grand Prix taking place at Donington Park in which Cotton finished 7th.

1936 was a particularly busy year for Wilkinson as he, Walter Hassan, and ten others founded the BRMC. In 1937, he joined the BRDC as a driver member. During World War II he headed Rotol, a division of Rolls-Royce, distributing aircraft propellers. The war finished and Wilkie teamed up with Reg Parnell at Highlands Garage, Derby. During their partnership they toured Europe enjoying much success. In 1951, David Murray, then an Edinburgh accountant, persuaded Wilkie to become partners with him in a garage in Merchiston Mews. The word soon spread that the "Ace Tuner" had taken up residence and work began to flow in. Through this partnership, Ecurie Ecosse was formed. The team purchased a Cooper Bristol in order to compete in the 1952 season. The 1953 campaign brought about more consistent results including a 2nd place at Spa-Francorchamps with the C-type Jaguars.

Wilkie tuned and prepared the D-type Jags that won the 1956 and 1957 Le Mans races. This peak of success was not reached again with Ecurie Ecosse and so Wilkie moved on to Bourne and BRM working with the likes of Graham Hill and the Jackie Stewart Wilkie retired from BRM in 1972 to carry out other projects he wished to pursue.

He died in 2001.

== See also ==
- George Eyston
- BRM
- Le Mans

== Bibliography ==
- Dymock, Eric: Ecurie Ecosse: David Murray and the Legendary Scottish Motor Racing Team (PJ Publishing, 2007, ISBN 978-0-9550102-2-4)
- Gauld, Graham: Ecurie Ecosse: A Social History of Motor Racing from the Fifties to the Nineties (Graham Gauld Public Relations, Edinburgh, 1992, ISBN 0-9519488-0-6)
- Murray, David: Ecurie Ecosse: The Story of Scotland's International Racing Team (Stanley Paul, London, 1962)
