= Ian Connell (cricketer) =

Australian cricketer (born 1974)

Personal information
- Full name: Ian Michael Connell
- Born: 7 February 1974 (age 52); Hobart, Tasmania, Australia
- Batting: Right-handed
- Bowling: Right-arm fast-medium

Domestic team information
- Years: Team
- 1992/93: Tasmania

Career statistics
Competition	List A
Matches	1
Runs scored	–
Batting average	–
100s/50s	–/–
Top score	–
Balls bowled	66
Wickets	2
Bowling average	23.50
5 wickets in innings	–
10 wickets in match	–
Best bowling	2/47
Catches/stumpings	–/–
- Source: Cricinfo, 5 October 2011

Ian Michael Connell (born 17 February 1974) is an Australian former cricketer and senior planner. He was a right-handed batsman who bowled right-arm fast-medium. He was born at Hobart, Tasmania.

Connell played a single List A match for Tasmania against England A in February 1993. He took the wickets of Paul Prichard and Dominic Cork for the cost of 47 runs from 11 overs, with Tasmania winning by 24 runs. He made no further appearances for Tasmania following this match.

== See also ==
- List of Tasmanian representative cricketers
