= Pierre Maréchal =

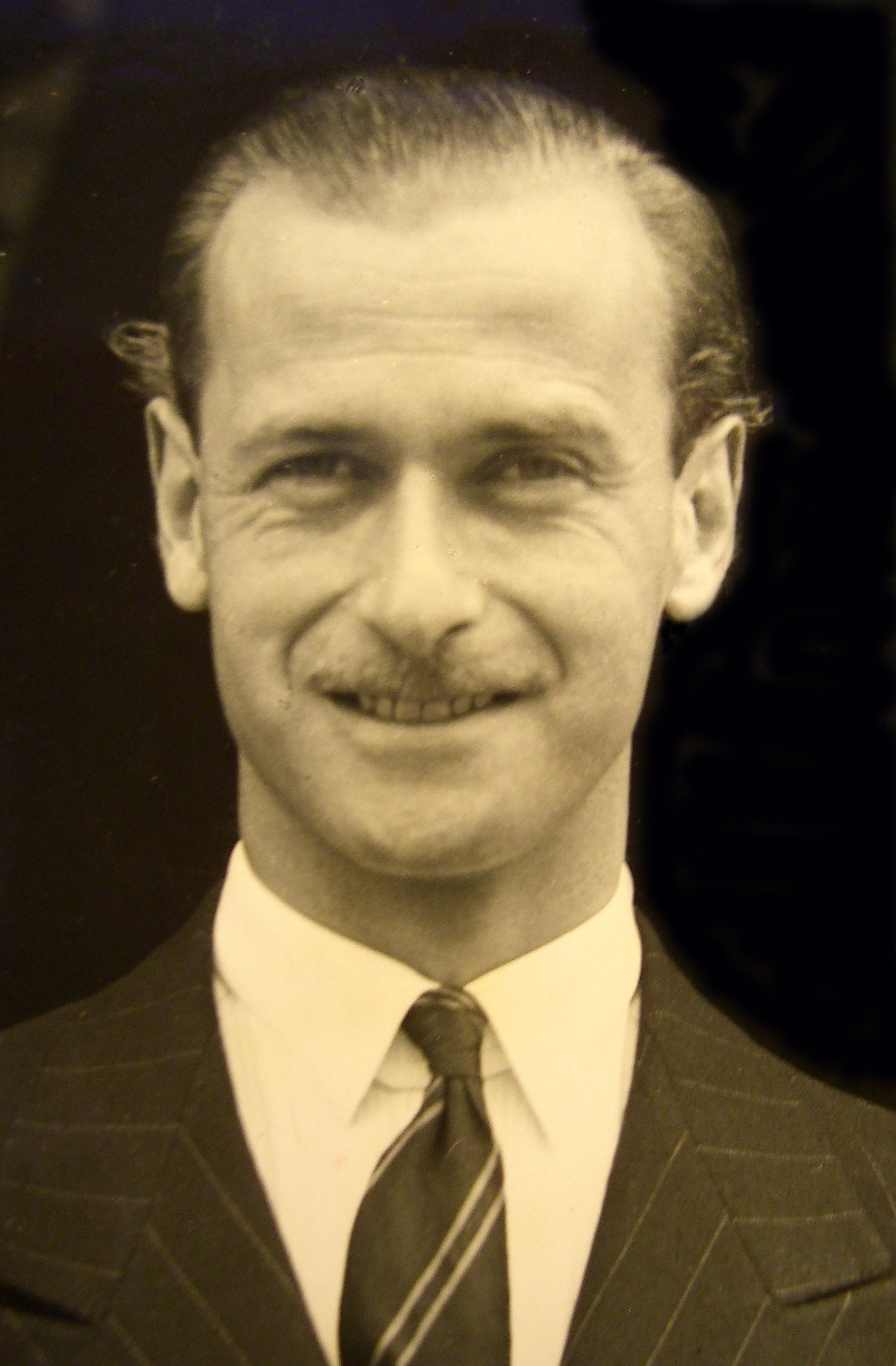
- Pierre Maréchal
- Nationality: (United Kingdom) British (France) French

24 Hours of Le Mans career
- Years: 1949
- Teams: Aston Martin

Jean-Pierre Maréchal (4 October 1915 – 27 June 1949) was an engineer and racing driver who died after his Aston Martin team car crashed in the first postwar running of the 24 Hours of Le Mans endurance race.

French-born, he settled in England and acquired British nationality.

== Biographical Details ==
Son of the French entrepreneur, film producer and Titanic survivor of the same name, Pierre Maréchal won his first races — at Santander, Cantabria, driving hydroplanes owned by family friend Count Soriano — at the age of 13.

He was educated at Downside School, England. From there he joined Ford’s engineering training programme but chronic back pain soon forced him to abandon the course.

At the onset of the Second World War he volunteered for the British army but was invalided out in 1940 because of the problems with his back. He then worked for Freddie Miles, of Miles Aircraft, and finally opened a small auto engineering business in Cheltenham, England.

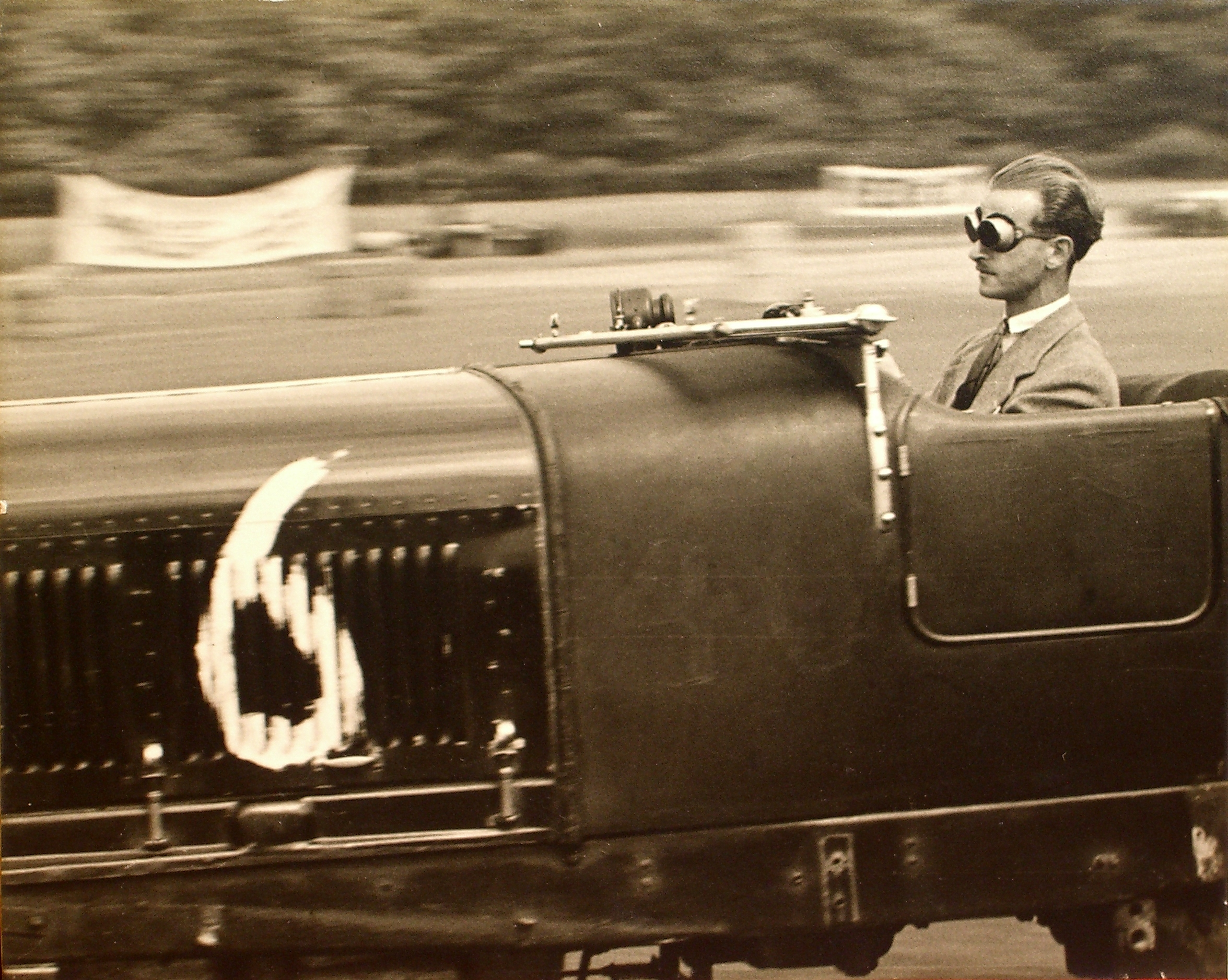
Maréchal racing his Bentley

He ran a modified 6 ½ Litre Bentley Speed Six after the war but declared a preference for his Duesenberg as a road car. He raced the Bentley, a rare short-chassis version thought to have been the pre-war factory racing team’s spare car, with "signal success." Briggs Cunningham, the American millionaire racer, sports car constructor, and car collector, bought the car from Maréchal's widow and it was later acquired, together with the rest of Cunningham's collection, by Miles Collier. It is now displayed at the Revs Institute, formerly the Collier Automotive Museum, in Naples, Florida, USA.

Maréchal was a member of the class-winning Ecurie du Lapin Blanc HRG sports car team in the 1948 Spa 24 Hours race. At this event, for the first time in Europe, the team introduced radio communication between drivers and pit crew. The innovation enabled one of the drivers to repair his car on the circuit and helped the team to win the coveted Coupe du Roi. Maréchal's outstanding natural flair brought him to the attention of Leslie Johnson, who won the race outright in a prototype Aston Martin shared with St. John Horsfall. Johnson picked Maréchal to partner T.A.S.O. Mathieson in one of three prototype Aston Martin DB2s entered by the manufacturer for the 1949 Le Mans 24-hour race. Motor Sport magazine said that "his inclusion . . . in the works team of Aston-Martins making its debut at Le Mans was indicative of the high opinion of his driving held in knowledgeable circles."

At Le Mans, Maréchal's car was well placed — 7th overall, 4th in the Index of Performance — when a brake line fractured, causing a brake fluid leak. He continued. With three hours left to run, he was without brakes but had improved to 4th overall. Motor Sport summarized his ensuing accident: "Alas, just as we hoped to see Maréchal press for his third place, it was reported at 1.05pm that the Aston Martin saloon had overturned at White House corner, Pierre being seriously hurt. His brakes had, it seems, been absent for many laps." The crash tore the engine from its mountings and flattened the roof, trapping Maréchal inside. Delage driver Louis Gérard, first on the scene, stopped to extricate him, losing two laps in the process. (Gérard would finish fourth.) Maréchal was taken to the nearby Delagenière clinic, where he succumbed to his injuries the next day. He was buried in his family's vault at Bailly, near Versailles. He was 33.

The newspaper Ouest-France noted: Le circuit 1949...fait une victime et un parmi les hommes les plus doués de ceux qui participèrent à l'épreuve.

Maréchal left a wife, Brigid, née Macnamara — they had married in 1942; and a son, Christian.

Several years later Brigid Maréchal married Leslie Johnson. Christian Maréchal became a journalist, advertising copywriter and creative director, and helped pioneer the UK ultralight aviation market.
