= Chris Staniland =

British pilot (b. 1905, d. 1942)

Flight Lieutenant Christopher Stainbank Staniland (7 October 1905 – 26 June 1942) was a Royal Air Force pilot, racing driver, and chief test pilot for the Fairey Aviation Company.

== Early life ==
He was born in Fallow Corner, North Finchley; the second son of Geoffrey Staniland, a solicitor, and his wife Millicent Ellen Marianne Leather. The family later moved to Lincolnshire. He attended King Edward VI Grammar School, Louth, then Tonbridge School in Kent.

Geoffrey Staniland was killed in Belgium on 14 April 1915, serving with the Lincolnshire Regiment. Millicent died in 1949.

Staniland joined the Royal Air Force in March 1924 on a Short Service Commission. He undertook his flying training at Shotwick. He was posted to 41 Squadron in February 1925 and remained with the unit until September 1928, when he was posted to the High Speed Flight RAF at Calshot. In November 1925, he was promoted to Flying Officer, and four years later to Flight Lieutenant, by then in the Reserve (RAFO), Class A. He relinquished his commission in the RAFO in March 1937, on completion of service, and was permitted to retain his rank.

== Fairey ==
Early in 1930 Staniland joined Fairey as their chief test pilot, flying from Great West Aerodrome (Harmondsworth Aerodrome). On 21 March 1933 he flew the first prototype F1875 of the Fairey Swordfish from Harmondsworth Aerodrome. He first flew the Fairey Firefly prototype on 22 December 1941.

== Motor Sport ==
Staniland was also a racing driver, winning a multitude of both car and motorcycle races between 1924 and 1938, predominantly at Brooklands racing circuit. In 1931 he drove an MG Midget to victory with the Earl of March at the Junior Car Club (JCC) race. With Malcolm Campbell in 1932 he took part in a JCC 100 mile and a British Racing Drivers' Club 500 mile race, driving a Mercedes Benz; and in 1933 he again partnered Campbell in a Sunbeam.

In George E. T. Eyston's September 1935 land speed record attempt for 24 hours in his car Speed of the Wind, at Bonneville Speedway in Utah, Staniland and Albert W. Denly were the relief drivers. The record attempt was successful, setting a new world record with an average lap speed of 140.522 miles per hour (226.148 km/h). Staniland had driven the final laps at around 154 miles per hour (248 km/h).

Staniland's records and race victories include, but are not limited to, the following:

=== Motorcycles ===
- 3rd place, 8 1/2 mi (13.7 km) Scratch Race for 500cc, Brooklands, 7 Jun 24
- 1st place, 8 1/2 mi (13.7 km) Handicap Race for 500cc, Brooklands, 7 Jun 24
- 2nd place, Handicap Race for Norton Machines, 8 1/2 miles (13.7 km), Brooklands, 18 Oct 24
- 1st place, Scratch Race for Solo Machines up to 500cc, 2 3/4 miles (4.4 km), Brooklands, 18 Oct 24
- 1st place, Team Race bet Norton & Sunbeam Motorcycles, 11 miles (18 km), Brooklands, 18 Oct 24
- 1st place, Scratch Race for Solo Machines up to 500cc, 5 3/4 miles (9.3 km), Brooklands, 18 Oct 24
- 1st place, Scratch Race for Solo Machines, unlimited capacity, 2 3/4 miles (4.4 km), Brooklands, 18 Oct 24
- 1st place, F. R. G. Spiking Silver Cup, Ten Lap Scratch Race, solo up to 500cc, Brooklands, 10 Jul 26
- 1st place, J. A. Welch Silver Cup, 3-Lap Handicap, solos 350-1,100cc, Brooklands, 10 Jul 26
- 2nd place, 3-Lap Passenger Handicap, up to 1,100cc, Brooklands, 20 Apr 27
- 500-mile World Sidecar Speed Record, Brooklands, 21 May 27
- 500-km & 1000-km World Sidecar Speed Records, Brooklands, 21 May 27
- 5, 6, 7, 8, 9, 10, 11 & 12-hr World Sidecar Speed Records, Brooklands, 21 May 27
- 1st place, Junior Race, 350cc, Brooklands, 9 Jul 27
- 1st place, Senior Sidecar Championship, 14 miles (23 km), Brooklands, 24 Sep 27
- 3rd place, Unlimited Sidecar Championship, 14 miles (23 km), Brooklands, 24 Sep 27
- 1st place, Grand Prix, Class F, sidecars up to 600cc, Brooklands, 8 Oct 27
- 1st place, Scratch Race, solo up to 350cc, 8 1/4 miles (13.3 km), Brooklands, 11 Apr 28
- 2nd place, Passenger Handicap, up to 1,100cc, 8 1/4 miles (13.3 km), Brooklands, 11 Apr 28
- 1st place, Light-Weight Grand Prix, 25 miles (40 km), Brooklands, 28 Jul 28
- 2nd place, Junior Grand Prix, 25 miles (40 km), Brooklands, 28 Jul 28
- 2nd place, Junior Sidecar Grand Prix, 25 miles (40 km), Brooklands, 28 Jul 28
- 1st place, Class A Championship Race, solo up to 350cc, 14 miles (23 km), Brooklands, 8 Sep 28
- 1st place, G. E. Totley Cup, 5-lap 350cc solo race, Brooklands, 6 Oct 28
- 1st place, Harry Jay Cup, 3-lap race, sidecars up to 350cc, Brooklands, 6 Oct 28
- 1st place, Lord Wakefield Cup, 5-lap Passenger Handicap, sidecars up to 1,100cc, Brooklands, 6 Oct 28
- 2nd place, George Newman Cup, 50-mile Handicap, solos up to 1,000 cc & sidecars up to 1,100 cc, Brooklands, 6 Oct 28
- 2nd place, 250cc Scratch Race, 8 miles (13 km), Brooklands, 1 Jun 29
- 3rd place, 90 mph Handicap, 6 miles (9.7 km), Brooklands, 1 Jun 29
- 1st place, Lacey Cup, 250cc Grand Prix, 25 miles (40 km), Brooklands, 22 Jun 29
- 1st place, Primrose Cup, 350cc Grand Prix, 25 miles (40 km), Brooklands, 22 Jun 29
- 1st place, Junior Sidecar Race, 25 miles (40 km), Brooklands, 22 Jun 29
- 2nd place, Senior Sidecar Race, 25 miles (40 km), Brooklands, 22 Jun 29
- 1st place, Light-Weight Race, 200 miles (320 km), Brooklands, 27 Jul 29
- 1st place, 250cc Solo Championships, 13 miles (21 km), Brooklands, 5 Oct 29
- 1st place, 250cc Sidecar Championship, 13 miles (21 km), Brooklands, 5 Oct 29
- 3rd place, 350cc Solo Championships, 13 miles (21 km), Brooklands, 5 Oct 29
- 1st place, 1-Lap Sprint Race, up to 250cc, 2 3/4 miles (4.4 km), Brooklands, 5 Apr 30
- 2nd place, 1-Lap Sprint Race, up to 350cc, 2 3/4 miles (4.4 km), Brooklands, 5 Apr 30
- 1st place, 3-Lap Solo Handicap Race, up to 350cc, 8 1/4 miles (13.3 km), Brooklands, 5 Apr 30
- 1st place (team of 3), 3x1-lap Relay Race, 2 3/4 miles (4.4 km) each, Brooklands, 5 Apr 30
- 1st place, Invitation Race, 8 1/4 miles (13.3 km), Brooklands, 5 Apr 30
- 1st place, 250cc solo Grand Prix, 25 miles (40 km), Brooklands, 29 May 30
- 2nd place, 350cc solo Grand Prix, 25 miles (40 km), Brooklands, 29 May 30
- 1st place, 250cc Grand Prix, 25 miles (40 km), Brooklands, 16 Aug 30
- 1st place, Sidecar Grand Prix, 25 miles (40 km), Brooklands, 16 Aug 30
- 2nd place, Winners’ Grand Prix Handicap, 25 miles (40 km), Brooklands, 16 Aug 30

=== Motor Cars ===
- British speed record 5 km Class E (8 cyl), Brooklands, 8 Jun 26
- British speed record 10 km Class E (8 cyl), Brooklands, 8 Jun 26
- 3rd place, 60th 100 mph Long Handicap, 9 1/3 miles (15.0 km), Brooklands, 5 Aug 28
- 2nd place, 43rd Lightning Short Handicap, 6 1/2 miles (10.5 km), Brooklands, 22 Sep 28
- 2nd place, 58th 100 mph Short Handicap, 6 1/2 miles (10.5 km), Brooklands, 22 Sep 28
- 1st place, Kent Short Handicap, 6 1/2 miles (10.5 km), Brooklands, 22 Mar 30
- 1st place, Cornwall Junior Long Handicap, 9 miles (14 km), Brooklands, 4 Aug 30
- 1st place (team of 2), Double 12-Hour Race, Class H, Brooklands, 8–9 May 31
- 5th place (team of 2), 500-Mile Race, Brooklands, 24 Sep 32
- 2nd place, Senior Short Handicap, 6 1/2 miles (10.5 km), Brooklands, 21 May 34
- 1-Lap Speed Record, Donnington, 18 Aug 34
- 5-Lap Speed Record, Donnington, 18 Aug 34
- 10-Lap Speed Record, Donnington, 18 Aug 34
- 2,000 & 3,000-mile World Land Speed Record (Team of 3 w Eyston & Denly), Bonneville Salt Flats, Utah, 16-17 Sep 35
- 2,000, 3,000, 4,000 & 5,000-km World Land Speed Record (Team of 3 w Eyston & Denly), Bonneville Salt Flats, Utah, 16-17 Sep 35
- 12-hr & 24-hr World Land Speed Record (Team of 3 w Eyston & Denly), Bonneville Salt Flats, Utah, 16-17 Sep 35
- 1st place, First Dunlop Outer Circuit Handicap, 9 miles (14 km), Brooklands, 24 Sep 38
- 1st place, Second October Long Handicap, Outer Circuit, 9 miles (14 km), Brooklands, 15 Oct 38
- 2nd place, Mountain Championship, 12 miles (19 km), Brooklands, 15 Oct 38
- 2 1/4 mi (3.6 km) Brooklands speed record, Class D (3 lit), Brooklands, 20 Oct 38
- 5-mile international speed record, Class D (3 lit), Brooklands, 20 Oct 38
- 10-mile international speed record, Class D (3 lit), Brooklands, 20 Oct 38

In March 1932, Staniland's home at Sunbury on Thames was broken into while he and his wife were in London. Twelve trophies, silver, cutlery and his racing car were stolen, but the car was later found abandoned at Clapham Common. It is unclear if any of the items were ever recovered or the thieves caught.

== Family ==
Staniland married Evelyn Mary Gregorie at Southampton register office on 29 June 1929, followed by a church ceremony at St. Peter's-in-Eastgate, Lincolnshire, on 19 February 1930. They divorced in 1937 without issue. Born in 1906, Evelyn, from Skellingthorpe, was the daughter of Frank St Barbe Gregorie. She remarried in November 1942 and died in 1980.

== Death ==
Staniland was killed in an accident on 26 June 1942, aged 36, when his aircraft, Z1827, the second Fairey Firefly prototype, broke up over Sindlesham (now in the Borough of Wokingham). He had taken off from Harmondsworth, and crashed in a field near Hatch Farm at Sindlesham Mill. He died before receiving medical attention. The investigation of the crash by the Accidents Investigation Branch concluded that a structural failure had occurred as the aircraft pulled out of a dive. He is buried in St Margaret's Church, Keddington, near Louth, in East Lindsey, Lincolnshire.

Business positions
Preceded by	Chief Test Pilot of the Fairey Aviation Company; 1930 - 1942	Succeeded by Foster H. Dixon, 1942 - 1945
