= Kenneth Evans (racing driver) =

British racing driver (1912–1985)

- Born: Kenneth Douglas Evans; 4 June 1912 Wimbledon, London
- Died: 30 March 1985 (aged 72) Chelsea, London

Kenneth Evans (4 June 1912 – 30 March 1985) was a British Grand Prix racing driver, active mostly before the Second World War.

== Career ==
Brothers Denis and Kenneth Evans ran a garage in Wandsworth - the Belle Vue garage - which mostly specialized in selling MGs. Sister Doreen was also a racing driver, the threesome being regular entrants at Brooklands, usually in cars painted green with a cream stripe, and their cars fettled by Wilkie Wilkinson.

Kenneth started to enter international racing in 1935, driving in the Coppa Acerbo in an MG R-type. He shared Ian Connell's Alfa Romeo 8C 2300 to a flagged-off 9th at the 1936 Donington Grand Prix, and, after MG withdrew from racing, he bought an ageing Alfa Romeo Tipo B - the very car in which Tazio Nuvolari won the 1935 German Grand Prix. In the Alfa he finished an excellent 9th at the 1937 German Grand Prix, "driving the race of his life".

On 7 August 1939, Evans took part in the last-ever meeting at Brooklands in the Alfa, finishing 6th in the Campbell Trophy scratch race. Two weeks later, Evans drove in his last Grand Prix, the Swiss, in his Tipo B. He finished a safe 11th, albeit only ahead of a pair of voiturettes. He undertook some limited racing after the Second World War, including the 1947 voiturette season, by which time he was driving Connell's Maserati 6CM, having sold the Alfa to Roy Salvadori. His 1947 season included three early Formula 1 races in France, his only finish being a 7th and last (in a shared drive with Connell) at the Pau Grand Prix.

== Post-racing ==
In later life he became a vice-president of the British Racing Drivers Club, his duties including being chief flag marshal for the British Grand Prix, and he was instrumental in the foundation of the Brooklands Museum Trust.

== Results ==
- Pre-war voiturette results
- Post-war results
