= 1939 24 Hours of Le Mans =

16th 24 Hours of Le Mans endurance race

Previous: 1938	Next: 1949
Index: Races | Winners

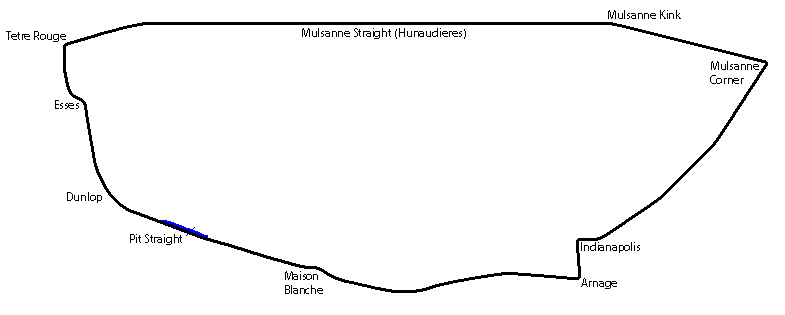
Le Mans in 1939

The 1939 24 Hours of Le Mans was the 16th Grand Prix of Endurance. It took place at Circuit de la Sarthe on 17 and 18 June 1939. The race was won by a supercharged Bugatti Type 57, driver by works drivers Jean-Pierre Wimille and Pierre Veyron, setting a new distance record.

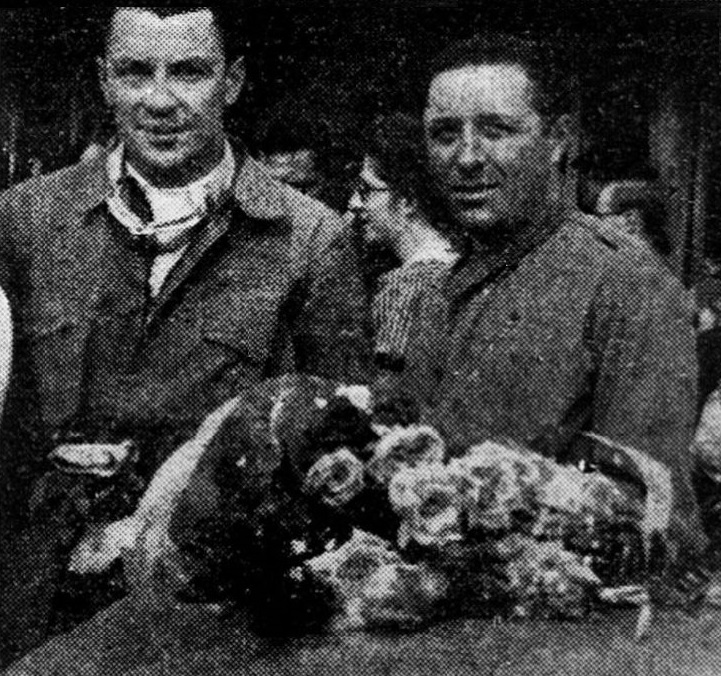
Wimille and Veyron, 1939 race-winners

The race proved to be an even contest between the major French marques of Delahaye, Talbot, Bugatti and the smaller-engined Delage. Soon after the start, Louis Gérard got to the front in his Delage and held off all the others for 20 hours. In the evening and into the night, it was Robert Mazaud in his Delahaye and 2-time winner Luigi Chinetti in a Talbot that provided an exciting 3-way tussle for the lead, that ended when Mazaud's engine caught fire around 2am, and Mathieson had a tyre blow out that planted the Chinetti Talbot into the Tertre Rouge sandbank at breakfast time. The Bugatti had been maintaining a watching brief on these cars in fourth and gradually picked up its speed. When the Delage pitted with a misfiring engine with just over 3 hours to go, Wimille was able to make up the 2-lap deficit, sweep past into the lead, and then ease back to take the victory ahead of Gérard in the ailing Delage. Two brand new Lagonda V12s took third and fourth after a reliable run in their first race.

In a event run in good weather throughout, Mazaud had set a new lap rerecord, and four of the six class-winners set new distance records. The BMW works team had dominated their 2-litre class, running amongst the bigger 3-litre cars. Once again Amédée Gordini and José Scaron had shown great pace in their 1100cc SIMCA, and this time reliability got them to a clear class victory, finishing 10th overall, as well as convincingly winning the Index of Performance and Biennial Cup prizes.

== Regulations and Organisation ==
The German manufacturers had adapted very quickly to the new regulations of the AIACR and continued their dominance in Grand Prix racing. In response, the French association (ACF) promoted and enlarged their national championship running to its broader formula. Now comprising 11 races, there were 5 for sports cars (including Le Mans), 2 Grand Prix to AIACR rules, 3 voiturette races and a hill-climb event. The Automobile Club de l'Ouest (ACO) made no notable changes to its own regulations aside from its regular adjustment of the respective Index targets (as per the table below). For the first time, the ACO approached sponsors to offer prizemoney and a total of FF100,000 (equivalent to about £11.000) was provided in conjunction with three major sponsors. The newspaper Le Matin would pay FF1000 to the overall leader on each hour plus FF10000 to the winner of each class at the end of the race; MGF Insurance would award FF10000 to the winner of the Coupe Biennale. Finally, the Conférence des Assureurs offered prizes to the top six qualifiers in the Index competition including FF25000 to the winner. This year Esso was the fuel supplier with the equivalent four options available: its standard petrol, "Super-Esso" premium, 100% benzole and its ternary blend of the regular with benzole and ethanol. A new spectator bank was built along the first curve in anticipation of greater crowds. The final notable innovation was the first use of an electronic timing system. Provided by the ACF, it was a great improvement on manual stopwatch timing, especially at nighttime and in poor visibility.

Engine size	1938 Minimum distance	1939 Minimum distance	Average speed	Equivalent laps
6000cc+	2,800 km (1,700 mi)	2,822 km (1,754 mi)	117.6 km/h (73.1 mph)	209.2 laps
5000cc	2,727 km (1,694 mi)	2,757 km (1,713 mi)	114.9 km/h (71.4 mph)	204.4 laps
4000cc	2,667 km (1,657 mi)	2,703 km (1,680 mi)	112.6 km/h (70.0 mph)	200.4 laps
3000cc	2,571 km (1,598 mi)	2,616 km (1,626 mi)	109.0 km/h (67.7 mph)	193.9 laps
2000cc	2,400 km (1,500 mi)	2,459 km (1,528 mi)	102.5 km/h (63.7 mph)	182.3 laps
1500cc	2,250 km (1,400 mi)	2,320 km (1,440 mi)	96.7 km/h (60.1 mph)	172.0 laps
1100cc	2,062 km (1,281 mi)	2,143 km (1,332 mi)	89.3 km/h (55.5 mph)	158.8 laps
750cc	1,800 km (1,100 mi)	1,891 km (1,175 mi)	78.8 km/h (49.0 mph)	140.2 laps

== Entries ==
With the ACF Championship recharging French motor-racing, there was a strong field present for the 4.5-litre regulations. with entries from teams with Delahaye, Talbot and Delage cars. The outlier was a single works-supported Bugatti, with a supercharged engine outside the French regulations. They would be up against a new Alfa Romeo and a return from the British Lagonda team. In the other classes, the Adler team was joined by their fellow German BMW works team. Amédée Gordini presented the biggest block with his modified Simca-Fiats for a strong attempt at the Index of Performance prize.

Thirteen entrants from the 15 finishers of the 1938 race arrived for the Coupe Bienniale.

Category	Entries	Classes
Large-sized engines	19 / 17	over 3-litre
Medium-sized engines	16 / 13	1.5 to 3-litre
Small-sized engines	12 / 12	up to 1.1-litre
Total entrants	47 / 42	

- Note: The first number is the total entries, the second the number who started. Using the equivalent engine-size, with supercharged engines having the x1.65 conversion factor

=== Over 2-litre entries ===
The semi-works Écurie Bleue of Laury and Lucy Schell had been broken up after their frustration and disappointment at being passed over for government funding for their Delahaye car-development. However, the success of the reliable Delahaye 135 in the 1938 race saw eight privateers bring their cars to this year's race (although only one was in the Coupe Biennale). Leading them was Robert Mazaud with his car, lightened and modified after a major crash at Spa the year before. Lowered and fitted with aerodynamic cycle wings, he was also running it in Grand Prix races. His co-driver once again was Marcel Mongin. Three other drivers pooled resources and formed a new team, the Écurie Francia: Le Mans winner Eugène Chaboud had his trusty 3-year-old chassis, while Joseph Paul and Marcel Contet bought cars from the Écurie Bleue. Also lightened and lowered, they had been getting reasonable success in French rallying and racing. As they were running as a new team, last year's winner Chaboud was not eligible for the Coupe. Louis Villeneuve, who had finished 4th in 1938, carried the only Coupe entry for Delahaye, running his standard 135 CS. A young Rob Walker, a member of the Johnnie Walker whiskey family, had bought his ex-Bira Delahaye almost on a whim, for £400 from the London showroom in Park Lane. The agent, Count Doric Heyden, lodged his entry to Le Mans. In contrast, Joseph Chotard was the owner of a well-known Parisian brothel, and had bought the Écurie Bleue car that had finished third in 1937. Crashed in practice at the Paris 12-hours race, it had been repaired in time for Le Mans. The final Delahaye was that of André Bellecroix, with Gaston Serraud as his co-driver, who had finished second the year before.

The other big entry came from Talbot. The new single-seater MC90 and two-seat MD90 for the AIACR regulations were proving not as competitive as promised against the might of the German machines, and the new engines (a V16 4.5-litre and a supercharged 3.0-litre) were still in development. Luigi Chinetti was running a nominal works team, with strong factory support, and brought four cars to the race. So, the current 3-litre straight-6 was further developed to now put out 230 bhp and the T150 Course sports cars were fitted with those engines for Le Mans. Chinetti had lined up regular drivers Philippe Étancelin, René Le Bègue and René Carrière in his squad. However, in May, Carrière crashed his MD90 heavily at the Eifelrennen breaking his leg and ending his career; and with Étancelin unavailable in June, Chinetti found himself short of drivers for his four entries. He, himself, took the lead car, with Brit T.A.S.O. Mathieson, who had run a privateer Talbot the year before. Le Bègue would race with Pierre Bouillin, who had bought his Talbot off Le Bègue two years previously. André Morel, who had finished 3rd the previous year, led the other car. Chinetti once again also supported the entry of two 4-litre Super Sports coupés, styled by the Parisian coachbuilding company Figoni et Falaschi. He fitted one with a new works 4.5-litre engine, but when the licence of British amateur C.F. Shrubsall was questioned by the ACO during practice due to his erratic driving, the car was taken over by Parisian banker Pierre Louis-Dreyfus (who had finished second in 1936, racing under his pseudonym "Heldé") and his good friend, Antoine Schumann. The pair had raced together in the 1931 and ’32 races. The other was a brand-new chassis prepared specially for the race for Duke Philippe de Massa and entered by Mathieson. Aside from the works team, there were also two other private entrants. Raoul Forestier had bought the ex-“Raph” car that had burst into flames at the 1938 race. Le Mans winner Jean Trémoulet had his entry to the Biennale and entered the car as Forester's co-driver. Earlier in the year at Pau, Trémoulet had raced the overly-complex French SEFAC in its second, and final, GP start.

Raymond Sommer entered another sleek works-prepared Alfa Romeo coupé. Pulling back from a Grand Prix program, the focus of the company was instead put into sports car racing, and this was a racing version of the new 6C-2500 Super Sport road car, styled by Carrozzeria Touring in Milan. The 2.5-litre Tipo 256 engine was designed by Vittorio Jano and was a DOHC straight-six. In race-trim it was tuned up to 120 bhp and seven short-wheelbase Corsa chassis were built. Italian leader Benito Mussolini had banned all Italian drivers from competing overseas, (in response to League of Nations sanctions), so Sommer was without a works co-driver this year. He approached the young English-educated, Siamese royal Birabongse Bhanudej, who raced under the name of "Prince Bira". Already a regular Grand Prix racer, he had come to Le Mans as a spectator in 1935 with his royal cousin. Being a track on public roads, he had discretely joined the night practice by driving his open-top Bently onto the circuit at the Tertre Rouge corner and completed several high-speed laps before, just as quietly, pulling off the circuit before being noticed by the officials.

Bugatti returned to Le Mans after the works team entered no major sports-car races in 1938. A one-off special was prepared by Jean Bugatti and entered by the team's lead-driver Jean-Pierre Wimille. The ACO regulations allowed for supercharged engines, albeit with a sizeable x1.65 equivalence penalty. The one-off Type 57C was based on the chassis of the luxury tourer, fitted with a 3250cc straight-4 engine. With a supercharger, and fine-tuned by the factory, it put out around 200 bhp. A streamlined magnesium-alley bodyshell had a minimal windscreen for the driver and an angled spotlight recessed on the right-hand side to better illuminate the apex of the corners. Wimille had Bugatti voiturette works-driver Pierre Veyron as his co-driver, who had not raced for two years.

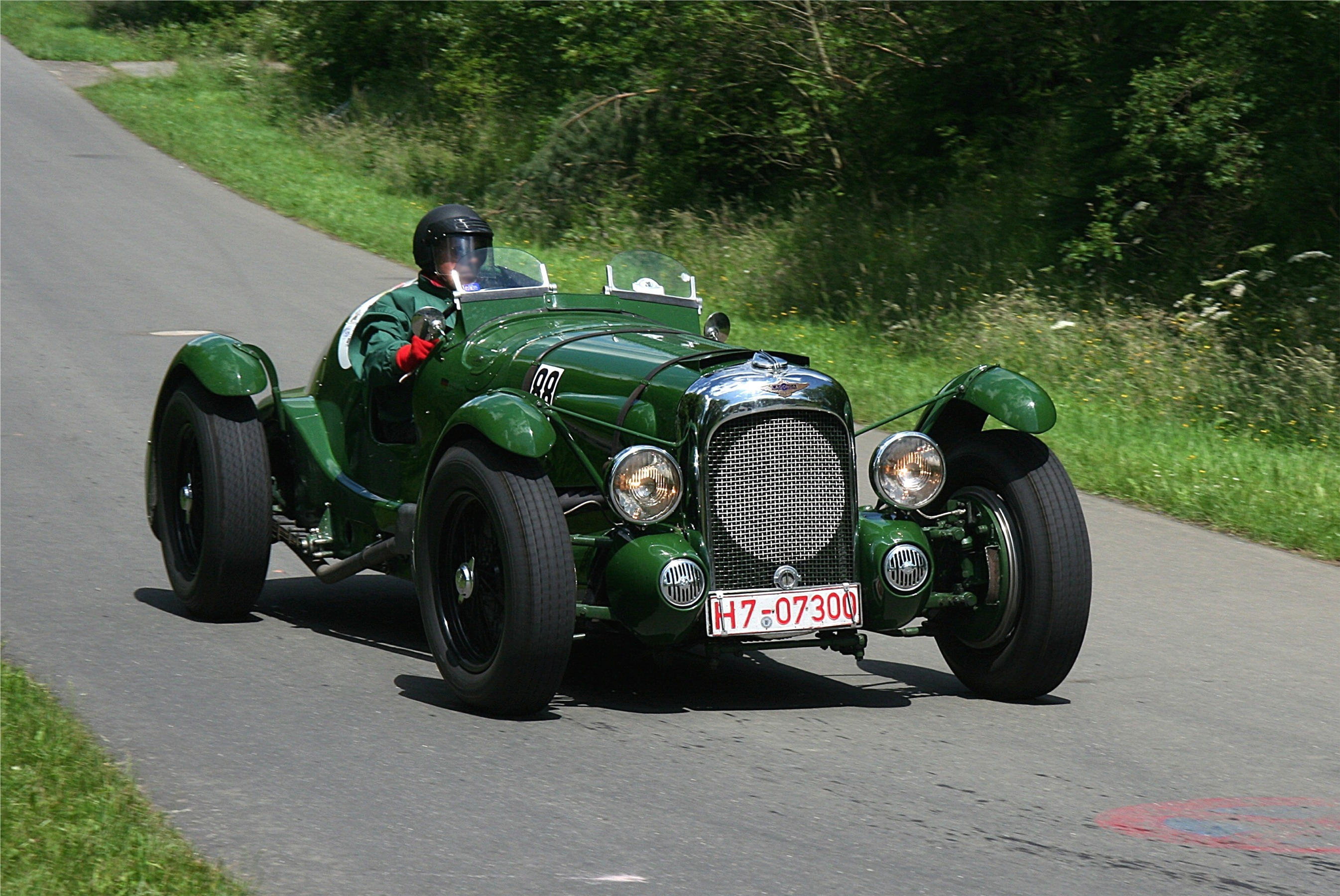
Lagonda V12

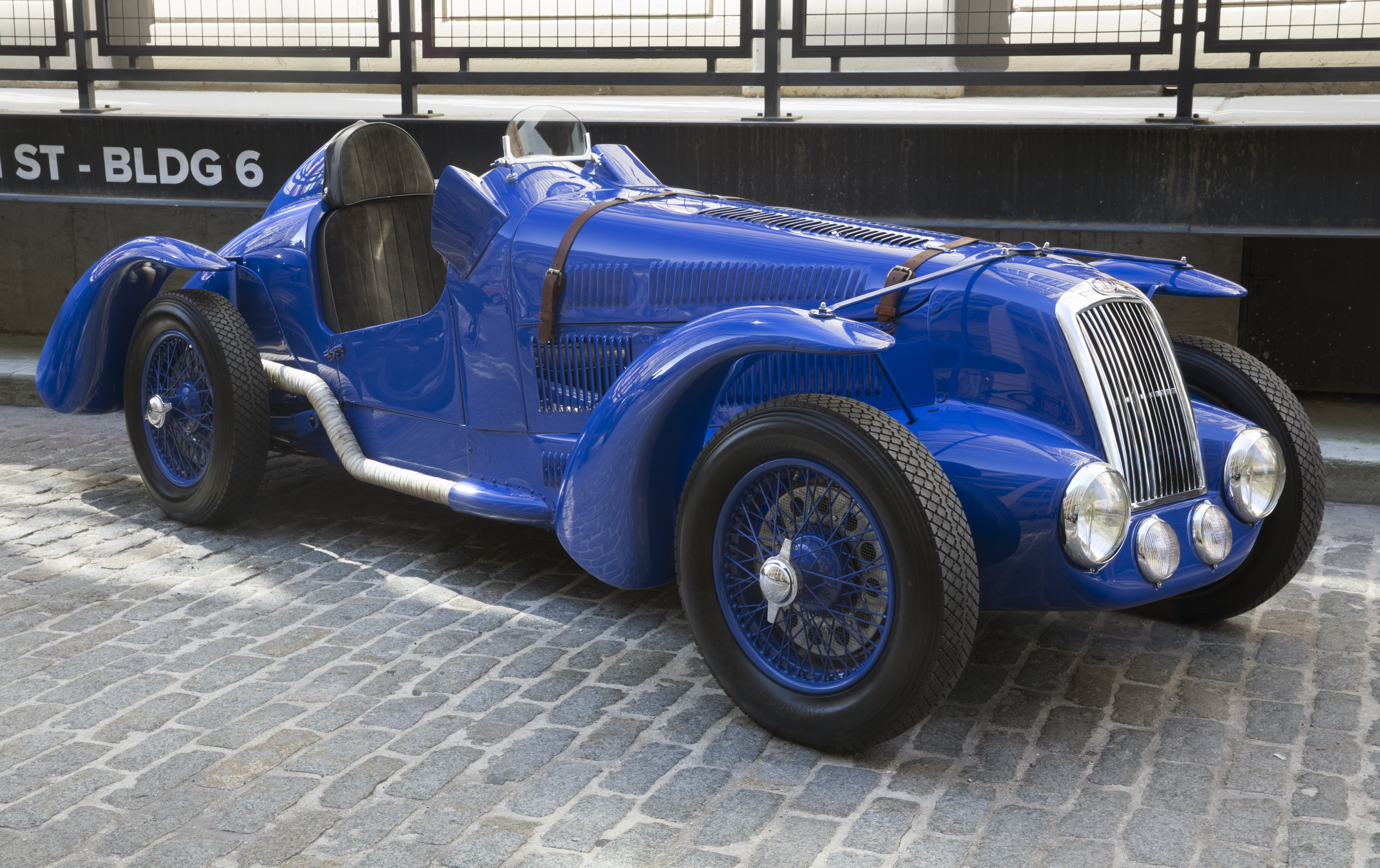
Delage D6-3L

In 1935, the Arthur Fox Lagonda had finally broken the string of Alfa Romeo wins by taking victory. The marque returned this year with its new V12 model. W.O. Bentley had won four Le Mans with his own company before its liquidation. He was now main designer at Lagonda. He brought Stewart Tresilian with him (from his next venture at Rolls-Royce) as the lead engineer for the new car. Tresilian had a proven design record in V12 aero-engines including the Rolls-Royce Merlin. The new engine was a 4480cc V12 DOHC that generated 180 bhp through a 4-speed synchromesh gearbox. The ladder-frame chassis was fitted with fully independent front-suspension and hydraulic brakes. Extensive high-speed testing was done at Brooklands before it entered production in 1938. In December, it was decided to race at Le Mans and a lightened, short-wheelbase chassis was built. The engine was also lightened and tuned up to 210 bhp. Charles Brackenbury was lead driver and was going to be accompanied by British ace Dick Seaman, works driver for the Mercedes GP team, but they would not release him to race (tragically, he would be killed a week later at the Belgian Grand Prix). So, the experienced ERA driver Arthur Dobson was brought in. Meanwhile, the wealthy racer Peter, Lord Selsdon, had recently inherited his title and approached Lagonda offering to pay for a second car to be prepared. Ready at the final moment, it got its pre-race testing being driven, at speed, to Le Mans. For their first competitive event, Bentley wanted the cars to run at a set average pace of 135 km/h which was slightly faster than the race-winner in 1938.

Louis Gérard and Walter Watney had found their 4.5-litre V12 Delage disappointing in grand prix racing. They therefore looked to a new project with the 3-litre supercharged rules. The Briton Watney was the main Delage dealer in Paris and bought the assets when the company filed for bankruptcy in 1935. They based the new racer on the chassis of the Delage D6 Olympic 4-seater tourer. Two cars were fitted with aerodynamic aluminium bodywork, including a shaped cowl behind the driver that led into the long swooping tail. The 3.0-litre engine was a straight-six with an aluminium head. Choosing to run them without the supercharger at Le Mans, it was tuned to 125 bhp and could get up to 210 km/h (130 mph). The works team was named as the Écurie Walter Watney, with Gérard and Georges Monneret as the two drivers. For Le Mans, they were paired together in one car, while French motorcycling champion Roger Loyer and the Swiss Armand Hug raced the second.

=== 1.1- to 2-litre entries ===
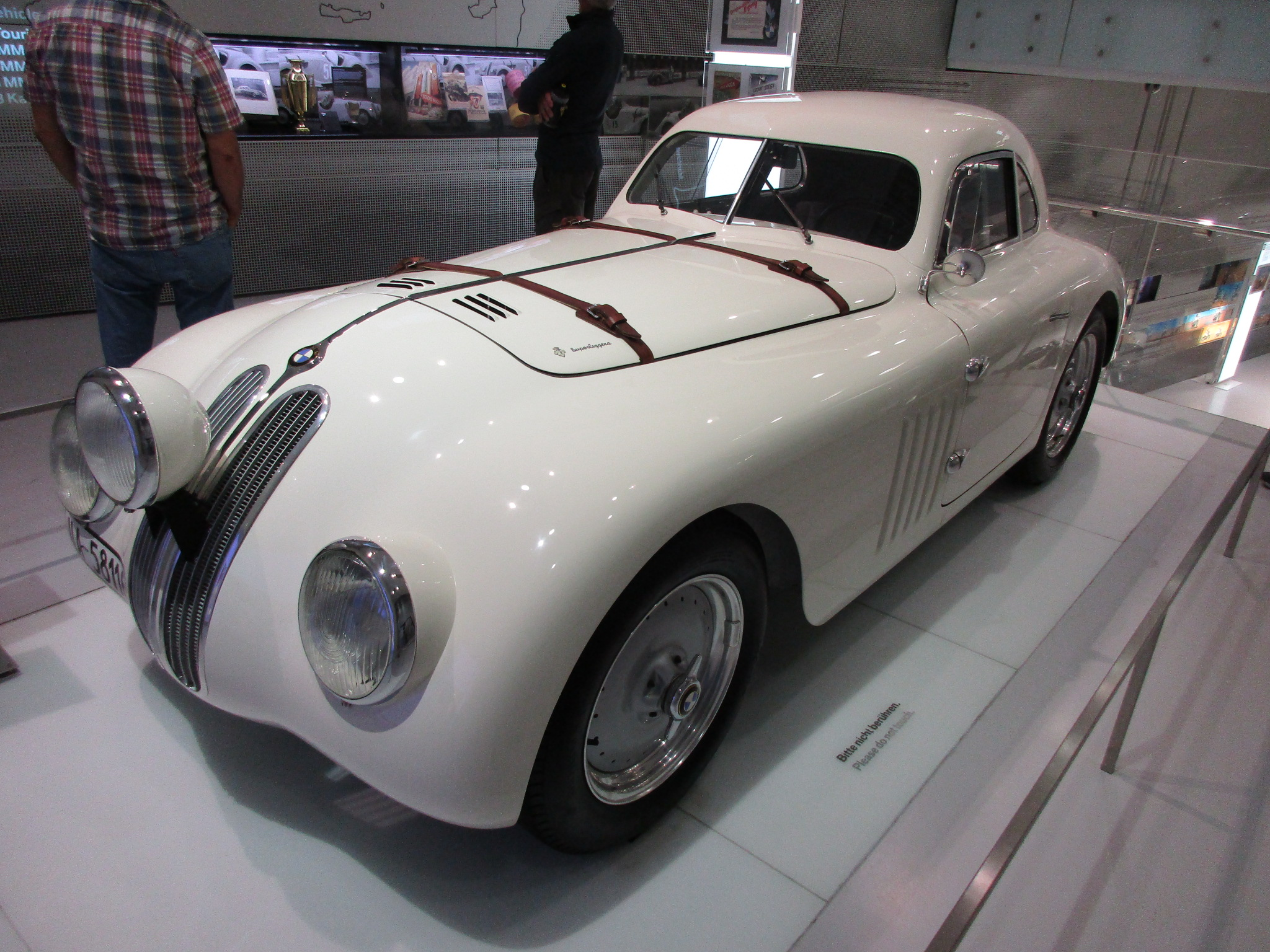
BMW 328 Touring Coupe

A BMW 328 had raced at Le Mans in 1937, but it had been taken out in the multi-car accident at the White House corner. Having subsequently been raced very successfully, the company decided to bring their cars back to Le Mans. Three were entered, now with improved engines that put out 135 bhp that could push them up to 220 km/h (135 mph). One of them was an aerodynamic coupé version, with a body fashioned by Carrozzeria Touring. The works team was supervised by the NSKK, the Nazi government motoring department of Adolf Hühnlein with its team leader, the Prinz zu Schaumburg-Lippe, and BMW engineer Fritz Wenscher in the coupé. The two roadsters were driven by Ralph Röese (who had won the Belgian GP des Frontières in May) and Paul Heinemann and Willi Briem/Rudolf Scholz.

The Adler works team had run like clockwork taking class victories in both 1937 and 1938 with their streamlined "Rennlimousine". However, BMW was taking the competition to them now and a racing model of the new Typ 10 saloon was developed. Moving up another class category, the 2.5-litre side-valve straight-six engine put out 80 bhp when tuned for race performance and the teardrop shape got the car up to 150 km/h (95 mph). “Huschke” von Hanstein was lead driver and would be relying on the better fuel efficiency to beat BMW. Works drivers, Paul von Guilleaume and Otto Löhr, who had won the 1.5-litre class, were back to defend their title with their Adler Trumpf Rennlimousine taking the team's second Coupe Biennale entry.

For the third time, Robert Hichens entered his Aston Martin Speed and returned with his co-driver Mort Morris-Goodall again. The other Aston in the field was Morris-Goodall's 4-year-old 1.5-litre Ulster, now owned and entered by Frenchman Victor Polledry, who had raced it for the past 3 years. Most recently, the car had won the Bol d’Or at Montlhéry, driven by Marcel Contet. With Contet driving a Delahaye this year, Polledry drove with Robert Klempenère. Just-Émile Vernet was racing in his 8th consecutive Le Mans this decade, joining Carl de Bodard and his 1.5-litre Riley TT Sprite that they had raced together in the Paris 12 Hours. Another Riley entered was that of Georges Brunot, who had acquired one of the Paulin streamlined cars from the Écurie Eudel of Guy Lapchin.

Peter Clark returned to Le Mans with a new HRG for his team, the Écurie Lapin Blanc. His co-driver again was factory engineer, Marcus Chambers, who had installed a modified Singer engine along with a lightened body for racing. H. F. S. Morgan had been impressed enough by the publicity the previous year from Prudence Fawcett. Now married, Fawcett had retired from racing but offered her Biennale entry. Faced with competing against the strong Simca team, her car's engine was bored out to just over 1100 cc to put it into the lightly entered 1.5-litre class with no increase to the Index distance required. It was also fitted with twin carburettors and an uprated exhaust. Morgan works manager, Geoff White, would drive the car with Dick Anthony, who race-prepared Aston Martins in his London motor garage.

=== up to 1.1-litre entries ===
The lightning-fast Simcas prepared by Amédée Gordini had amazed people in the previous year’s race and a squadron of seven of his cars looked set to dominate the small classes again this year. Work was done on the Simca 8 to improve the 60 bhp engine’s reliability, the chassis was stiffened and the brakes improved. A new bodyshell was designed, with a longer front and again built of light duralumin alloy. Gordini was effectively running a works team of five cars, which had already scored good results earlier in the year. Two of the Huits had the streamlined body, with Gordini and José Scaron in the lead car, (with the Biennale entry) and Debille/Breillet in the other. Meanwhile, Charles Plantivaux (750 class-winner last year) and Guy Lapchin raced the 1938-car. They also fielded two of the dogged little Simca Cinq, that once again had the 750cc class to themselves. There were also three privateer Simca entries. Just-Émile Vernet brought one of his Gordini-prepared Huits, with one of his regular partners, Gaston Tramer with Robert Cayeux driving this time. Anne-Cécile Rose-Itier was now a veteran female racer and rally driver. She also had a Gordini Huit with Vernet’s former co-driver, Suzanne Largeot. Finally, Victor Camérano returned with his SIMCA Huit saloon.

To take on the Simcas, there were three privateer Singers. Class-winners Jacques and Pierre Savoye returned with their Coupe Biennale entry, while two British drivers, Arthur Jones and Archie Scott, had acquired their Singer Nine Le Mans Replicas from the former works Team Autosports.

Two refurbished MGs rounded out the field. American Miles Collier had bought one of the PA Midgets raced by the all-female team in 1935. Alongside his two brothers, Collier had founded the Automobile Racing Club of America in 1934 and competed successfully with the MG. After a traffic accident, he commissioned Grumman Aircraft engineer John Oliveau to design a new streamlined chassis, now fitted with a supercharged 847cc MG engine. With Oliveau as team manager, Collier submitted only the second American entry to the ACO and brought in experienced British MG trials-driver Lewis Welch as his co-driver. The other MG was that of Frenchman Claude Bonneau who also had an aerodynamic shell fitted over his chassis after a traffic accident.

== Practice and Pre-race ==
During scrutineering Lord Howe, as British RAC representative, pointed out to the ACO that the Adler team were not following the regulations for fuel-tank security. Several teams were having great difficulty getting to scrutineering – Raymond Sommer was being thwarted by heavy snow in bringing his Alfa Romeo over the Mont Cenis Pass from Turin. Sommer, himself, arrived at 2pm, while his car was wheeled in at 3.45pm. Right behind it was the Bugatti works team, just making the 4pm deadline. Practice was run in good weather during the week, and night-practice was done from 1am to 6am to minimise impact on the public roads. Brunot's streamlined Riley had an engine failure and without spares it had to be scratched. His co-driver Lucien Langlois, a former Delahaye owner, found a new seat with the Delahaye of Joseph Chotard. It was worse for the new 2.5-litre Adler which was crashed heavily and could not be repaired for the race. Bugatti's tribulations continued when the car blew its engine during practice. Spare pistons were dispatched overnight from the factory.

== Race ==
=== Start ===
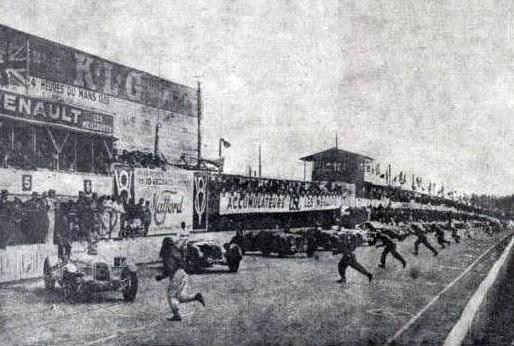
The traditional "Le Mans start", as the drivers run to their cars

Cars on the run down to the Esses

The Villeneuve Delahaye ahead of a BMW roadster with the Bugatti behind

Race day was a warm, sunny summer day bringing 120,000 spectators and tourists flooding out of the city for the event. As often the case, Sommer was the first away, but with him starting halfway down the field it was the Lagonda of Arthur Dobson who led the pack under the Dunlop bridge followed by Chinetti in his Talbot and Wimille in the big Bugatti. Left behind was both Bonneau's MG and Serraud, who could not get his Delahaye gearbox to engage (losing two laps straight away). At the end of the first lap, it was Chinetti ahead of Dobson, Mazaud (Delahaye), Wimille, Le Bègue (Talbot) and Gérard (Delage). The latter was on a mission, and on the second lap, he was up to second and by the third lap, Gérard had taken the lead and set about building a gap. By the end of the first hour, he had a good margin over the Delahayes of Mazaud and Paul, then Wimille and the Talbots of Chinetti, "Heldé" and Le Bègue. The Lagondas fell back, to run to their pre-arranged pace. Sommer's bad luck struck again, stopping out on the circuit on the third lap and losing a lap to the leaders. In the second hour, he pitted on his 19th lap to blow water out of an engine cylinder and change a gasket, spending an hour in the pits. An early retirement was the hitherto reliable Adler. Löhr brought the car in after 45 minutes, and six laps, with a broken piston.

Having settled in, Mazaud now started pulling in the Delage. Relentless in pursuit, on lap 25 he broke the track record with a 5:12.1, previously held by Robert Benoist in the Bugatti Type 57G. He finally caught and passed Gérard just after the 2-hour mark and for the next hour, the two ran nose-to-tail passing each other. The first refuelling stops came round straight after that. In the third hour, ACO race director Charles Faroux stepped out to black-flag Forestier's Talbot for mechanical issues. However, without a number associated with the flag, the driver was unaware. It was several laps before the pit-crew could make him stop. It was found he had a major oil-leak after the oil-filler cap had not been properly secured by the ACO official at the pitstop. Now leaving an oil trail all around the track, it caused big problems for the other drivers. Mahé had a lurid spin in the Talbot coupé but escaped without any damage. Anne-Cécile Rose-Itier crashed her Simca 8 on the slippery track at the Arnage corner, rolling the car. She was taken to hospital with bruising and in shock. Another Simca hit the oil at the sweeping curve after the pits after clipping the inside curb, before skating down the track backwards and hitting the outside fencing and rebounding back into the middle of the track. Without a seatbelt, the driver, Jean Breillet, had been tossed out the car and was fortunate to be uninjured. The spectators got another scare when the ambulance sent to the scene pulled across the track right in front of an approaching car coming around the bend unsighted, only narrowly avoiding another big accident.

=== Night ===
Heavy clouds had been building up through the later day, but the night was clear and the rain stayed away. Going into the evening, there was an exciting race at the front between the Gérard/Monneret Delage, the Mazaud/Mongin Delahaye and the Chinetti/Mathieson Talbot, with the lead changing back and forth according to refuelling stops and driver changes. By quarter-distance, at 10pm, the Talbot had completed 65 laps, along with the Delahaye and Delage both on the same lap, all separated by less than 30 seconds. Between them, they had put a lap on the big Bugatti and a further lap back to the second Delage, of Loyer/Hug (63). The Contet and Chaboud Delahayes were both 3 laps back (62). The Dobson Lagonda was 8th (61) and Le Bègue's Talbot in 9th (60 laps). Strong driving by Gérard got him back in the lead with a lap's advantage by midnight. A serious accident occurred in the early hours when Bellecroix swerved coming onto the Hunaudières straight. The Delahaye clipped a roadside tree and flew off the road between two others, rolled and ending up against the wall of one of the roadside houses. Bellecroix was taken to hospital as a precaution but only had light injuries. Then, soon before 2am, the Mazaud Delahaye made a spectacular exit, its engine bursting into flames on the run from White House. Desperately driving the last kilometre to get to the fire extinguishers in the pits, the car appeared like a blazing torch out of the darkness. Although Mazaud was uninjured, the car could not be saved, its electrics burnt out and their race was over. A number of the French cars failed overnight with mechanical and electrical issues: Chaboud would not win consecutive races, along with the Talbots of Le Bègue and Mahé – all of whom had been running in the top-10.

At the midway point of 4am, the Delage had done 129 laps and established a solid 3-minute lead ahead of Chinetti and Wimille (128) while the sister Delage was still keeping in touch a further lap back in 4th. A bigger margin now stretched the rest of the field, with Contet in fifth (122) ahead of the two Lagondas (121 & 118). The 2-litre BMWs were running very reliably and mixing it with the remaining Delahayes, having long left the Aston Martin (the only other car in the class) behind. Schaumberg-Lippe's coupé was best-placed in 8th (116), with his teammates in 10th and 12th (115). By dawn, at the start of a clear, warm summer day, the top-4 were all on the same lap again. The Index handicap race was still very close. A number of cars were well ahead of their schedules, with Gérard also leading it, being 33% ahead of target. Just behind on paper were team-mate Hug and Gordini's Simca, both on a score of 1.32. Chinetti and Schaumburg-Lippe's BMW were vying for fourth (1.27) while the other two BMWs, by virtue of being 2 laps behind their team-leader, were next on 1.25. All things indicated a record distance was on the cards at this pace.

=== Morning ===
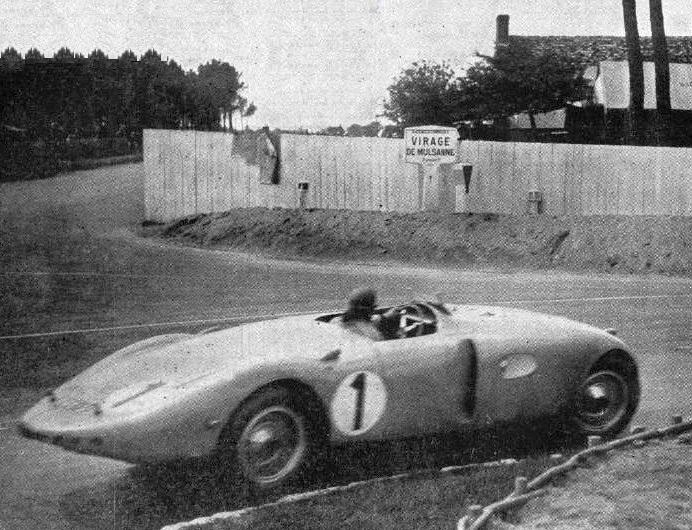
Wimille and his Bugatti taking the Mulsanne corner

More drama occurred at breakfast time, when Mathieson suffered a puncture coming out of Tertre Rouge onto the back straight. Hug, in the second Delage, was following close behind and collided with Mathieson, taking them out the race. The Talbot was pitched into the sandbank which cost a lot of time to be dug out then change the wheel. It was all for nought though, as Mathieson only got as far as the Mulsanne corner at the end of the straight before pulling over with terminal suspension damage. That marked the end of the Talbot challenge, with all six cars now out the race and leaving Monneret with a comfortable lead into the morning. Having just taken second place, the Bugatti lost 10 minutes when it stopped on-track after Wimille felt a wheel-hub breaking. He carefully made his way back to the pits and got it replaced. This now gave Gérard a 3-lap lead over the Bugatti. The two Lagondas were running to their proscribed pace, in 3rd and 4th, until Dobson had an extended pitstop to fix a slipping clutch on his Lagonda. By way of comparison, Gérard and Monneret were doing 5:28 laps, Wimille in pursuit was back to 5:21 while the Lagondas were doing 5:46. The metronomic BMWs had now moved up to 5th, 8th and 9th with the Delahayes of Contet and Villeneuve sandwiched in between them. However, the Contet/Brunet car was forced out soon after with suspension failure while running sixth.

Into the morning, attrition continued to pick off cars regularly and by 9am half of the field had retired. Wisdom and Scott were disqualified by the officials for early refuelling. Rust and dirt from their Singer's fuel tank had tainted the fuel system, however in the process of cleaning it out they lost too much fuel and could only complete 23 of the mandatory 24 laps between fuel top-ups. The Alfa Romeo had had a problematic race; after its initial engine issues, they had run well, moving up the field. But the enclosed saloon was stiflingly hot, and the rear brakes were overheating, costing time as buckets of water were used to dowse them in the pit-stops. Sommer and Bira finally admitted defeat at 11am. In the smaller-classes, the BMWs had been dominating. However, around 9am Gordini overtook them in the Index competition as he moved up the field near the top-10.

=== Finish and post-race ===
The defining moment of the race was shortly before 1pm when Monneret brought the Delage into the pits complaining of a misfire and his feet getting scorched. At the time they held a 2-lap lead over the Bugatti. The bonnet went up and the plugs were changed, but when it went out, it was still misfiring. In that time, Wimille had pulled back a lap. Then, when the Delage pitted again after an exploratory lap, he swept by again, into the lead and that was the race decided. It was found that the Delage's exhaust was loose and a valve-spring had broken. After 40 minutes Gérard was able to get going again, but was in no position to chase the Bugatti, and held station. Jean Bugatti told his drivers to ease back and not stress the engine. Everyone was focused on getting to the finish line as the clock ticked down, with a number of those as walking wounded.

Wimille broke his own distance record with half an hour to spare and took the win at 4pm. It was his second, and what would turn out to be the final major victory for Bugatti. Gérard did make it to the end, finishing three laps behind. Collecting FF17000 in hourly bonuses was some consolation. Both cars exceeded the previous overall distance record, set by the Bugatti of Wimille and Benoist in 1937. Gérard also broke his own class record of 1937 in the 3-litre class by 2 laps. The Lagondas had a trouble-free race and finished third and fourth. Neither car had needed a wheel-change through the race. The BMW team finished fifth, seventh and ninth to take a clean sweep of the 2-litre podium. The coupé led the team home and beat the class distance-record by 10% (22 laps, 291 km / 181 miles). Aside from gearbox problems for the Briem/Scholz roadster in the latter half of the race, the team ran well. However, they were beaten to the Index of Performance prize by Simca. Gordini and Scaron again had an extraordinary race, completely dominating their class. This year, their speed once again had them mixing with the mid-sized cars, but this time reliability got them to the finish, coming home 10th overall. Simca took a 1-2-3 podium in the class, with teammates Lapchin/Plantivaux second, almost 250 km (18 laps) behind and together they took first and second in the Index prize.

Louis Villeneuve's privateer car was the best of the Delahayes, covering just 600m short of the Delahaye winner's distance of the previous year, however this year it was only good enough for sixth place. Debutante Rob Walker finished eighth, having chosen to run the race in full pin-stripe suit. A broken exhaust had severely blistered the right foot of his co-driver, so Walker ended up driving for 16 of the 24 hours, soaking his own foot in water during pit stops. The HRG had been running well and leading the 1.5-litre class. Despite late engine trouble in the last hours again, and running on three cylinders, it held on to finish 14th and take its class victory. Behind them, and second in class, was the Morgan that had a far better performance this year, going 21 laps further than in 1938. Lapping over 40 seconds faster, the first half of the race had been very good with the car only spending 7 minutes in the pits. However, several stops in the last quarter of the race to fix a sticking throttle stymied their charge on the ailing HRG although they did finish 4th in the Index prize. The Arthur Jones Singer had developed engine issues in the afternoon and parked in the pits. It came back out in the last hour, limping around at a touring speed and just managed to make its required distance by mere minutes, finishing 18th. Once again, the two tiny Simca Cinq ran very reliably, finishing within a lap of each other at the tail of the field. Their goal had been to break 2000km for a distance record, and the Alin brothers missed that mark by barely 600 metres.

One of the last races of the year would be at La Baule, in Brittany. Jean Bugatti chose to enter the 57C for Wimille and was taking it for a test-run at dusk when a young cyclist rode onto the Strasbourg main highway. Swerving at high speed to avoid him, he hit three trees head-on and was killed. His loss devastated his father Ettore Bugatti. The company was already in dire financial problems and plans were drawn up to relocate to Belgium to avoid creditors. However, three weeks after that war was declared and virtually all international motor-racing ceased for six years. Many automobile manufacturers would have their factories repurposed to support military production while a number of European circuits, including Le Mans, were converted to airfields. Endurance racing would not return to Le Mans until 1949.

== Official results ==
=== Finishers ===
Results taken from Quentin Spurring’s book, officially licensed by the ACO
Class Winners are in Bold text.

Pos	Class	No.	Team	Drivers	Chassis	Engine	Tyre	Target distance*	Laps
1	**8.0** **	**1**	**(France) J.-P. Wimille** (private entrant)	**(France) Jean-Pierre Wimille** **(France) Pierre Veyron**	Bugatti Type 57C	Bugatti 3.3L S8 supercharged	D	205	248
2	**3.0**	**21**	**(United Kingdom) Écurie Walter Watney**	**(France) Louis Gérard** **(France) Georges Monneret**	Delage D6-3L	Delage 3.0L S6	D	194	245
3	**5.0**	**5**	**(United Kingdom) Lagonda Ltd**	**(United Kingdom) Arthur Dobson** **(United Kingdom) Charles Brackenbury**	Lagonda V12	Lagonda 4.5L V12	D	203	239
4	5.0	6	(United Kingdom) Lord Selsdon (private entrant)	(United Kingdom) Peter Mitchell-Thomson, Lord Selsdon (United Kingdom) William ‘Bill’ Walrond, Lord Waleran	Lagonda V12	Lagonda 4.5L V12	D	203	238
5	**2.0**	**26**	**(Germany) NSKK-Korpsführung**	**(Germany) Max, Prinz zu Schaumburg-Lippe** **(Germany) Fritz Hans Wenscher**	BMW 328 Coupé	BMW 1976cc S6	C	182	236
6	5.0	12	(France) L. Villeneuve (private entrant)	(France) Louis Villeneuve (France) René Biolay	Delahaye 135 CS	Delahaye 3.6L S6	D	199 [B]	235
7	2.0	27	(Germany) NSKK-Korpsführung	(Germany) Ralph Röese (Germany) Paul Heinemann	BMW 328	BMW 1976cc S6	C	182	230
8	5.0	20	(United Kingdom) Count Heyden	(United Kingdom) Rob Walker (United Kingdom) Ian Connell	Delahaye 135 CS	Delahaye 3.6L S6	D	198	224
9	2.0	28	(Germany) NSKK-Korpsführung	(Germany) Willi Briem (Germany) Rudolf Scholz	BMW 328	BMW 1976cc S6	C	182	220
10	**1.1**	**39**	**(France) Écurie Gordini**	**(France) Amédée Gordini** **(France) José Scaron**	Simca 8 Gordini	Fiat 1088cc.S4	D	159 [B]	213
11	5.0	14	(France) J. Chotard (private entrant)	(France) Joseph Chotard (France) "Jacques Seylair" (Lucien Langlois)	Delahaye 135 CS	Delahaye 3.6L S6	D	198	202
12	2.0	29	(United Kingdom) R. P. Hichens (private entrant)	(United Kingdom) Cdr Robert Hichens (United Kingdom) Mortimer Morris-Goodall	Aston Martin Speed	Aston Martin 1967cc S4	D	182	199
13	1.1	41	(France) Écurie Gordini	(France) Guy Lapchin (France) Charles Plantivaux	Simca 8 Gordini	Fiat 1087cc.S4	D	159 [B]	195
14	**1.5**	**32**	**(United Kingdom) Écurie Lapin Blanc** **(United Kingdom) HRG Engineering Company**	**(United Kingdom) Peter Clark** **(United Kingdom) Marcus Chambers**	HRG Le Mans	Singer 1496cc S4	D	172 [B]	192
15	1.5	37	(United Kingdom) Miss P.M. Fawcett (private entrant)	(United Kingdom) Geoffrey White (United Kingdom) Cuthbert "Dick" Anthony	Morgan 4/4	Coventry Climax 1104cc S4	D	159 [B]	184
16	1.5	34	(France) Just-Émile Vernet	(France) Just-Émile Vernet (France) Carl de Bodard	Riley TT Sprite	Riley 1496cc S4	D	172 [B]	180
17	1.1	38	(France) V. Camérano (private entrant)	(France) Victor Camérano (France) Henri Louveau	Simca 8 saloon	Fiat 1090cc.S4	D	159 [B]	163
18	1.1	45	(United Kingdom) A. W. Jones (private entrant)	(United Kingdom) Arthur Jones (United Kingdom) Gordon Wilkins	Singer Nine Le Mans Replica	Singer 972cc S4	D	154	154
19	**750**	**48**	**(France) Écurie Gordini**	**(France) Adrien Alin** **(France) Albert Alin**	Simca 5 Gordini	Fiat 566cc S4	D	125	148
20	750	49	(France) Écurie Gordini	(France) Maurice Aimé (France) Albert Leduc	Simca 5 Gordini	Fiat 568cc S4	D	125	147

=== Did Not Finish ===
Pos	Class	No	Team	Drivers	Chassis	Engine	Tyre	Target distance*	Laps	Reason
DNF	3.0	25	(France) R. Sommer (private entrant)	(France) Raymond Sommer (Thailand) Prince Bira	Alfa Romeo 6C 2500 SS Corsa	Alfa Romeo 2.4L S6	P	189	173	engine (19hr)
DNF	5.0	18	(France) Écurie Francia	(France) Marcel Contet (France) Robert Brunet	Delahaye 135 CS	Delahaye 3.6L S6	D	198	171	suspension (morning)
DNF	1.5	31	(France) V. Polledry (private entrant)	(France) Victor Polledry (France) Robert Klempenère	Aston Martin 1½ Ulster	Aston Martin 1497cc S4	D	172	155	engine (late morning)
DNF	5.0	3	(Italy) Luigi Chinetti	(Italy) Luigi Chinetti (United Kingdom) T.A.S.O. Mathieson	Talbot-Lago T150C	Talbot 4.5L S6	D	203 [B]	154	accident damage (16hr)
DNF	3.0	22	(United Kingdom) Écurie Walter Watney	(France) Roger Loyer (Switzerland) Armand Hug	Delage D6-3L	Delage 3.0L S6	D	194	152	accident (15hr)
DNF	5.0	15	(France) R. Mazaud (private entrant)	(France) Robert Mazaud (France) Marcel Mongin	Delahaye 135 CS	Delahaye 3.6L S6	D	198	115	fire (11hr)
DSQ	1.1	44	(United Kingdom) A.C. Scott (private entrant)	(United Kingdom) Archie Scott (United Kingdom) Tommy Wisdom	Singer Nine Le Mans Replica	Singer 980cc S4	D	154	105	premature refuelling (morning)
DNF	5.0	9	(Italy) Luigi Chinetti	(France) René Le Bègue (France) ”Levegh” (Pierre Bouillin)	Talbot-Lago T150C	Talbot 4.0L S6	D	201	102	electrics (11hr)
DNF	5.0	19	(France) Écurie Francia	(France) Eugène Chaboud (France) Yves Giraud-Cabantous	Delahaye 135 CS	Delahaye 3.6L S6	D	198	99	engine (night)
DNF	5.0	8	(United Kingdom) T.A.S.O. Mathieson (private entrant)	(France) Duke Philippe de Massa (France) Norbert Jean Mahé	Talbot-Lago T150 SS Coupé	Talbot 4.0L S6	D	201	88	engine (8hr)
DNF	5.0	7	(Italy) Luigi Chinetti	(France) André Morel (United Kingdom) Jim Bradley	Talbot-Lago T150C	Talbot 4.5L S6	D	203	88	? (midnight)
DNF	5.0	10	(France) J. Trémoulet (private entrant)	(France) Jean Trémoulet (France) Raoul Forestier	Talbot-Lago T150C	Talbot 4.0L S6	D	201 [B]	68	radiator (late evening)
DNF	1.5**	36	(United States) M. Collier (private entrant)	(United States) Miles Collier (United Kingdom) Lewis Welch	MG Midget PA Special	MG 847cc S4 supercharged	D	170	63	fuel tank (8hr)
DNF	5.0	16	(France) Écurie Francia	(France) Joseph Paul (France) Jean Trévoux	Delahaye 135 CS	Delahaye 3.6L S6	D	199	62	engine (7hr)
DNF	5.0	11	(France) A. Bellecroix (private entrant)	(France) André Bellecroix (France) Gaston Serraud	Delahaye 135 CS	Delahaye 3.6L S6	D	199	50	accident (5hr)
DNF	1.1	43	(France) Just-Émile Vernet	(France) Robert Cayeux (France) Gaston Tramer	Simca 8 Gordini	Fiat 1087cc.S4	D	159	50	engine (night)
DNF	5.0	4	(Italy) Luigi Chinetti	(France) "Heldé" (Pierre Louis-Dreyfus) (France) Antoine Schumann	Talbot-Lago T150 SS Roadster	Talbot 4.5L S6	D	203	45	engine (evening)
DNF	1.1	47	(France) C. Bonneau (private entrant)	(France) Claude Bonneau (France) Max Mathieu	MG Midget PB Spéciale	MG 954cc S4	E	154 [B]	40	fuel system (7hr)
DNF	1.1	40	(France) Écurie Gordini	(France) Jean Breillet (France) Albert Debille	Simca 8 Gordini	Fiat 1087cc.S4	D	159	29	accident (4hr)
DNF	1.1	42	(France) Mme A.-C. Rose-Itier (private entrant)	(France) Anne-Cécile Rose-Itier (France) Suzanne Largeot	Simca 8 Gordini	Fiat 1087cc.S4	D	159	26	accident (4hr)
DNF	1.5	30	(Germany) Adlerwerke	(Germany) Otto Löhr (Germany) Paul von Guilleaume	Adler Trumpf Super Rennlimousine	Adler 1498cc S4 side-valve	E	172 [B]	6	engine (1hr)
DNF	1.1	46	(France) **J. Savoye** (private entrant)	(France) **Jacques Savoye** **(France) Pierre Savoye**	Singer Nine "Savoye Spéciale"	Singer 967cc S4	D	154 [B]	4	engine (1hr)

- Note *: [B]= car also entered in the 1938-39 Biennial Cup.
- Note **: equivalent class for supercharging, with x1.65 modifier to engine capacity.

=== Did Not Start ===
Pos	Class	No	Team	Drivers	Chassis	Engine	Reason
DNS	3.0	24	(Germany) Adlerwerke	(Germany) Fritz “Huschke” von Hanstein (Germany) . Karkmann	Adler Typ 10 Sport; Rennlimousine	Adler 2.5L S4 side-valve	accident in practice
DNS	1.5	33	(France) G. Bruenot (private entrant)	(France) Georges Bruenot (France) "Jacques Seylair" (Lucien Langlois)	Riley TT Sprite	Riley 1496cc S4	engine in practice
DNA	5.0	2	(France) Écurie Bleue	(Italy) Gianfranco Comotti (France) Albert Divo	Delahaye 145	Delahaye 4.5L V12	did not arrive
DNA	5.0**	23	(United Kingdom) R. Arbuthnot (private entrant)	(United Kingdom) Robert Arbuthnot	Alfa Romeo 8C-2900A	Alfa Romeo 2.9L S8 twin-supercharged	did not arrive
DNA	1.5	35	(United Kingdom) C.H.H. Morrison (private entrant)	(United Kingdom) Charles Morrison	Atalanta	Atalanta 1495cc S4	did not arrive

=== 1939 Index of Performance ===
Pos	1938-39 Biennial Cup	Class	No.	Team	Drivers	Chassis	Index Result
1	1st	1.1	39	(France) Écurie Gordini	(France) Amédée Gordini (France) José Scaron	Simca 8 Gordini	1.351
2	-	2.0	26	(Germany) NSKK-Korpsführung	(Germany) Max, Prinz zu Schaumburg-Lippe (Germany) Fritz Hans Wenscher	BMW 328 Coupé	1.299
3	-	3.0	21	(United Kingdom) Écurie Walter Watney	(France) Louis Gérard (France) Georges Monneret	Delage D6-3L	1.267
4	-	2.0	27	(Germany) NSKK-Korpsführung	(Germany) Ralph Röese (Germany) Paul Heinemann	BMW 328	1.256
5	2nd	1.1	41	(France) Écurie Gordini	(France) Guy Lapchin (France) Charles Plantivaux	Simca 8 Gordini	1.237
6	-	2.0	28	(Germany) NSKK-Korpsführung	(Germany) Willi Briem (Germany) Rudolf Scholz	BMW 328	1.213
7	-	8.0	1	(France) J.-P. Wimille (private entrant)	(France) Jean-Pierre Wimille (France) Pierre Veyron	Bugatti Type 57C	1.210
8	3rd	5.0	12	(France) L. Villeneuve (private entrant)	(France) Louis Villeneuve (France) René Biolay	Delahaye 135 CS	1.190
9	-	5.0	5	(United Kingdom) Lagonda Ltd	(United Kingdom) Arthur Dobson (United Kingdom) Charles Brackenbury	Lagonda V12	1.182
10	-	750	48	(France) Écurie Gordini	(France) Adrien Alin (France) Albert Alin	Simca 5 Gordini	1.181
13	4th	1.1	37	(United Kingdom) Miss P.M. Fawcett (private entrant)	(United Kingdom) Geoffrey White (United Kingdom) Cuthbert "Dick" Anthony	Morgan 4/4	1.162
15	5th	1.5	32	(United Kingdom) Écurie Lapin Blanc (United Kingdom) HRG Engineering Company	(United Kingdom) Peter Clark (United Kingdom) Marcus Chambers	HRG Le Mans	1.121
17	6th	1.5	34	(France) Just-Émile Vernet	(France) Just-Émile Vernet (France) Carl de Bodard	Riley TT Sprite	1.050
18	7th	1.1	38	(France) V. Camérano (private entrant)	(France) Victor Camérano (France) Henri Louveau	Simca 8	1.036

- Note: A score of 1.00 means meeting the minimum distance for the car, and a higher score is exceeding the nominal target distance. Only the top 10 of the 20 finishers of this year's competition are listed. There were seven finishers of the 13 eligible cars in the Biennial Cup.

=== Class Winners ===
Class	Winning Car	Winning Drivers
B – 5 to 8-litre	#1 Bugatti Type 57C	Wimille / Veyron *
C - 3 to 5-litre	no finishers	
D - 2 to 3-litre	#21 Delage D6-3L	Gérard / Monneret *
E - 1500 to 2000cc	#26 BMW 328 Coupé	Wenscher / zu Schaumburg-Lippe *
F - 1100 to 1500cc	#32 HRG Le Mans	Clark / Chambers
G - 750 to 1100cc (new class)	#39 Simca Huit Gordini	Gordini / Scaron *
H - Up to 750cc (new class)	#48 Simca Cinq Gordini	Alin / Alin
Note *: setting a new class distance record.

=== Statistics ===
- Fastest Lap – R. Mazaud, #15 Delahaye 135 S – 5:12.1; 155.6 km/h (96.7 mph)
- Winning Distance – 3,354.8 km (2,084.6 mi)
- Winner’s Average Speed – 139.8 km/h (86.9 mph)
- Attendance – 120000
