= 1947 Marseille Grand Prix =

Race details
- Date: 18 May 1947
- Official name: VI Grand Prix de Marseille
- Location: Prado, Marseille
- Course: Temporary Street Circuit
- Course length: 4.399 km (2.733 mi)
- Distance: 69 laps, 303.538 km (188.610 mi)

Pole position
Driver	(France) Raymond Sommer	Maserati
- Time: 2:14.7

Fastest lap
Drivers	(France) Raymond Sommer	Maserati
	(Italy) Luigi Villoresi	Maserati
- Time: 2:17.2

Podium
First	(France) Eugène Chaboud	Talbot-Lago
Second	(Switzerland) Enrico Platé	Maserati
Third	(France) Henri Louveau	Delage

The VI Grand Prix de Marseille was a Formula One motor race held on 18 May 1947 at Prado in Marseille. The race was held over 69 laps and was won by Eugène Chaboud in a Talbot-Lago MC. Enrico Platé was second in a Maserati 4CL and Henri Louveau third in a Delage 3L. Raymond Sommer was on pole position, and set joint fastest lap with Luigi Villoresi; both retired their Maseratis with mechanical problems.

== Classification ==
Pos	No	Driver	Car	Time/Laps	Grid
1	22	(France) Eugène Chaboud	Talbot-Lago MC	2:50:23.6; 106.89kph	3
2	32	(Switzerland) Enrico Platé	Maserati 4CL	+1 lap	5
3	12	(France) Henri Louveau	Delage 3L	+2 laps	9
4	14	(France) Pierre Levegh	Delage 3L	+3 laps	11
5	18	(United Kingdom) David Hampshire (United Kingdom) Fred Ashmore	ERA A-Type	+3 laps	10
6	46	(France) Jean Achard	Delage 3L	+4 laps	
7	24	(France) Yves Giraud-Cabantous	Delahaye 135S	+7 laps	
8	38	(France) Edmond Mouche (France) José Scaron	Talbot-Lago 150C	+8 laps	6
9	42	(Italy) François Michaud	Bugatti Type 57S	+9 laps	
Ret	48	(France) Louis Rosier	Talbot-Lago T150S	Cylinder head	
Ret	26	(France) Charles Pozzi	Delahaye 135S	Half shaft	
Ret	44	(France) Maurice Trintignant	Bugatti Type 51A	Overheating	
Ret	40	(France) Marcel Balsa	Talbot-Lago 150C		
Ret	28	(France) Roger Loyer	Delahaye 135S	Con-rod	
Ret	10	(France) Philippe Étancelin	Delage 3L	Engine	
Ret	20	(United Kingdom) Ian Connell	Maserati 6CM	27 laps, suspension	8
Ret	4	(Monaco) Louis Chiron	Maserati 4CL	27 laps, mechanical	4
Ret	8	(Italy) Nello Pagani	Maserati 4CL	23 laps, mechanical	7
Ret	2	(France) Raymond Sommer	Maserati 4CL	10 laps, engine	1
Ret	30	(Italy) Luigi Villoresi	Maserati 4CL	9 laps, engine	2
Ret	16	(United Kingdom) Reg Parnell	Maserati 4CL	2 laps, piston	
Ret	36	(Switzerland) Emmanuel de Graffenried	Maserati 4CL	0 laps	
DNS	34	(France) Benoit Falchetto	Bugatti Type 35		

Previous race: 1947 Roussillon Grand Prix	Formula One non-championship races 1947 season	Next race: 1947 British Empire Trophy
Previous race: 1946 Marseille Grand Prix	Marseille Grand Prix	Next race: 1949 Marseille Grand Prix
