= 1949 Roussillon Grand Prix =

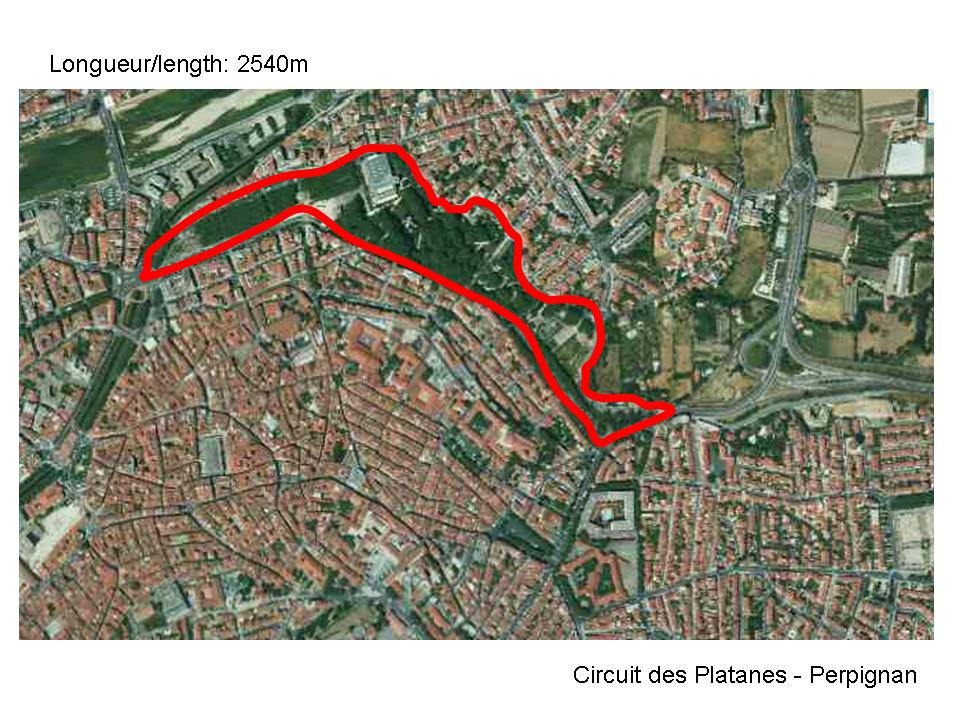

Race details
- Date: 8 May 1949
- Official name: IV Grand Prix du Roussillon
- Location: Circuit des platanes de Perpignan; Perpignan, France
- Course: Street circuit
- Course length: 2.538 km (1.577 miles)
- Distance: 2x50 laps, 253.800 km (157.704 miles)

Pole position
Driver	(Thailand) Prince Bira	Maserati 4CLT/48
- Time: 1:27.9
- Grid positions set by heat results

Fastest lap
Driver	(Thailand) Prince Bira	Maserati 4CLT/48
- Time: 1:27.3

Podium
First	(Argentina) Juan Manuel Fangio	Maserati 4CLT/48
Second	(Thailand) Prince Bira	Maserati 4CLT/48
Third	(Argentina) Benedicto Campos	Maserati 4CLT/48

The 1949 Roussillon Grand Prix (formally the IV Grand Prix du Roussillon) was a Grand Prix motor race held at Circuit des Platanes de Perpignan in Perpignan, France on 8 May 1949. The Grand Prix was raced in two 50 laps sessions, with the final standing given by the addition of the two results.

== Entry list ==
Juan Manuel Fangio is on a two victory in a row (San Remo and Pau) for his first racing season in Europe. Henri Louveau share during the races his Delage 3000 n°22 with Francisco Godia Sales. Eugène Martin wasn't present despite his commitment.

No	Driver	Entrant	Car	Engine	Chassis	Qual.
2	(France) Raymond Sommer	Equipe Gordini	Simca Gordini T11	Gordini	0006GC	5
4	(Argentina) Juan Manuel Fangio	Squadra Argentina	Maserati 4CLT/48	Maserati 4CL		2
6	(Argentina) Benedicto Campos	Squadra Argentina	Maserati 4CLT/48	Maserati 4CL		4
8	(Italy) Luigi Villoresi	Scuderia Ambrosiana	Maserati 4CLT/48	Maserati 4CL		3
10	(Thailand) Prince Bira	Prince Bira	Maserati 4CLT/48	Maserati 4CL		1
12	(Switzerland) Emmanuel de Graffenried	Scuderia Enrico Platé	Maserati 4CLT/48	Maserati 4CL		8
14	(Italy) Nello Pagani	Scuderia Enrico Platé	Maserati 4CL	Maserati 4CL		9
16	(France) Maurice Trintignant	Equipe Gordini	Simca Gordini T15	Gordini	0011GC	6
18	(France) Robert Manzon	Equipe Gordini	Simca Gordini T11	Gordini	0004GC	7
20	(France) Eugène Martin	Eugène Martin	Jicey-BMW	BMW 328		DNA
22	(France) Henri Louveau (Spain) Francisco Godia Sales	Henri Louveau	Delage 3000	Delage D6	880004	11
24	(France) Pierre Levegh	Pierre Bouillin	Talbot-Lago T26C	Talbot 23CV	110005	10

== Qualifying ==
Pos	No	Driver	Car	Time
1	10	(Thailand) Prince Bira	Maserati 4CLT/48	1.27.9
2	4	(Argentina) Juan Manuel Fangio	Maserati 4CLT/48	1.29.2
3	8	(Italy) Luigi Villoresi	Maserati 4CLT/48	1.29.5
4	6	(Argentina) Benedicto Campos	Maserati 4CLT/48	?
5	2	(France) Raymond Sommer	Simca Gordini T11	?
6	16	(France) Maurice Trintignant	Simca Gordini T15	1.31.3
7	18	(France) Robert Manzon	Simca Gordini T11	1.32.6
8	12	(Switzerland) Emmanuel de Graffenried	Maserati 4CLT/48	1.32.6
9	14	(Italy) Nello Pagani	Maserati 4CL	1.34.0
10	24	(France) Pierre Levegh	Talbot-Lago T26C	1.35.3
11	22	(France) Henri Louveau	Delage 3000	1.35.5

== Classification ==
The heat 1 saw Juan Manuel Fangio and Luigi Villoresi fight for the first position but the Italian driver entered the pits to repair an oil pump problem. Luigi Villoresi lost 5 laps and Juan Manuel Fangio finished the 50 laps first with 25 seconds ahead of Prince Bira.

In the second heat, Prince Bira took the lead immediately over Juan Manuel Fangio who kept a close gap with the Siam driver. Prince Bira who needed to distance the Argentine attack and realized the fastest lap was 1:27.3 and won Heat 2 with less than a second ahead of Juan Manuel Fangio, Luigi Villoresi finished third.

Juan Manuel Fangio won the Grand Prix. It was his third of four consecutive wins in France. Prince Bira finished second and Argentine Benedicto Campos third. Fangio won his third victory in a row in Grand Prix motor racing.

=== Heat 1 ===
Pos	No	Driver	Car	Laps	Time/Retired	Grid
1	4	(Argentina) Juan Manuel Fangio	Maserati 4CLT/48	50	1:17:06.8 (98.75 km/h)	2
2	10	(Thailand) Prince Bira	Maserati 4CLT/48	50	1:17:31.9	1
3	6	(Argentina) Benedicto Campos	Maserati 4CLT/48	49	+1 lap	4
4	12	(Switzerland) Emmanuel de Graffenried	Maserati 4CLT/48	49	+1 lap	8
5	18	(France) Robert Manzon	Simca Gordini T11	49	+1 lap	7
6	14	(Italy) Nello Pagani	Maserati 4CL	48	+2 laps	9
7	24	(France) Pierre Levegh	Talbot-Lago T26C	46	+4 laps	10
8	16	(France) Maurice Trintignant	Simca Gordini T15	45	+5 laps	6
9	8	(Italy) Luigi Villoresi	Maserati 4CLT/48	45	+5 laps	3
10	22	(France) Henri Louveau	Delage 3000	44	+6 laps	11
Ret	2	(France) Raymond Sommer	Simca Gordini T11	2	Crash	5

- Pole position: Prince Bira in 1.27.9
- Fastest lap: Juan Manuel Fangio in 1:29.2 (102.37 km/h).

=== Heat 2 ===
Pos	No	Driver	Car	Laps	Time/Retired	Grid
1	10	(Thailand) Prince Bira	Maserati 4CLT/48	50	1:16:09.4 (99.36 km/h)	2
2	4	(Argentina) Juan Manuel Fangio	Maserati 4CLT/48	50	1:16:09.9	1
3	8	(Italy) Luigi Villoresi	Maserati 4CLT/48	50	1:17:14.1	9
4	6	(Argentina) Benedicto Campos	Maserati 4CLT/48	49	+1 lap	3
5	12	(Switzerland) Emmanuel de Graffenried	Maserati 4CLT/48	48	+2 laps	4
6	24	(France) Pierre Levegh	Talbot-Lago T26C	47	+3 laps	7
7	16	(France) Maurice Trintignant	Simca Gordini T15	46	+4 laps	8
8	14	(Italy) Nello Pagani	Maserati 4CL	46	+4 laps	6
9	22	(France) Henri Louveau (Spain) Francisco Godia Sales	Delage 3000	44	+6 laps	10 –
Ret	18	(France) Robert Manzon	Simca Gordini T11	24	Ret	5

- Pole position: Juan Manuel Fangio (The starting grid of the heat 2 is the order of the standing from the heat 1).
- Fastest lap: Prince Bira in 1:27.3

=== Aggregate final standing ===
Pos	No	Driver	Car	Laps	Time/Retired
1	4	(Argentina) Juan Manuel Fangio	Maserati 4CLT/48	100	2.33'16.7 (99.36 km/h)
2	10	(Thailand) Prince Bira	Maserati 4CLT/48	100*	2.33'41.3
3	6	(Argentina) Benedicto Campos	Maserati 4CLT/48	98	+2 laps
4	12	(Switzerland) Emmanuel de Graffenried	Maserati 4CLT/48	97	+3 laps
5	14	(Italy) Nello Pagani	Maserati 4CL	94	+6 laps
6	8	(Italy) Luigi Villoresi	Maserati 4CLT/48	93	+7 laps
7	24	(France) Pierre Levegh	Talbot-Lago T26C	93	+7 laps
8	16	(France) Maurice Trintignant	Simca Gordini T15	91	+9 laps
9	22	(France) Henri Louveau (Spain) Francisco Godia Sales	Delage 3000	88	+12 laps
nc	18	(France) Robert Manzon	Simca Gordini T11	73	Ret
nc	2	(France) Raymond Sommer	Simca Gordini T11	2	Crash

Grand Prix Race
1949 Grand Prix season
Previous race: 1948 Roussillon Grand Prix	Roussillon Grand Prix	Next race: none
