= 1948 Roussillon Grand Prix =

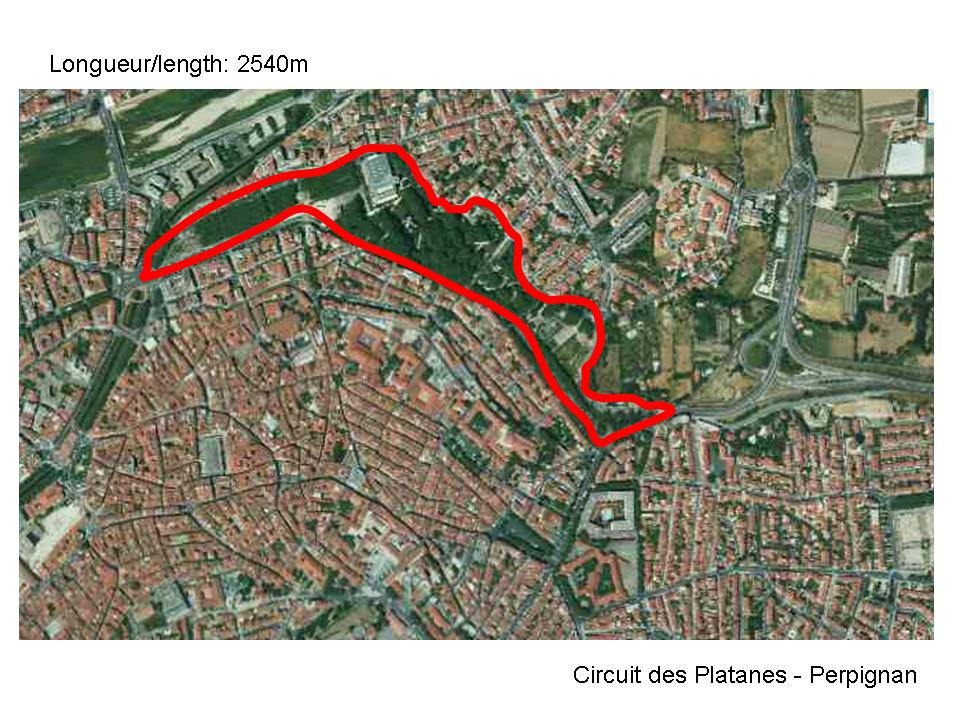

Race details
- Date: April 25, 1948
- Official name: III Grand Prix du Roussillon
- Location: Circuit des platanes de Perpignan; Perpignan, France
- Course: Street circuit
- Course length: 2.538 km (1.577 miles)
- Distance: 40 laps, 101.520 km (63.082 miles)

Fastest lap
Driver	(France) Maurice Trintignant	Equipe Gordini
- Time: 1:32.9

Podium
First	(France) Maurice Trintignant	Equipe Gordini
Second	(France) Robert Manzon	Robert Manzon
Third	(France) Raymond Sommer	Scuderia Ferrari

The 1948 Roussillon Grand Prix (formally the III Grand Prix du Roussillon) was a Formula Two automobile race that took place on April 25, 1948 at Circuit des Platanes de Perpignan in Perpignan, France. it was held over 40 laps with the best drivers from the two 27 laps heats.

== Entry list ==
No	Driver	Entrant	Car	Engine	Chassis	Qual.
2	(France) Jean-Pierre Wimille (France) Amédée Gordini	Equipe Gordini	Simca-Gordini T15/T1430	Gordini	08GC	
4	(Russian Empire) Igor Troubetzkoy	Equipe Gordini	Simca-Gordini T11/T1220	Gordini	04GC	
6	(France) Maurice Trintignant	Equipe Gordini	Simca-Gordini T11/T1430	Gordini	03GC	
8	(France) Raymond Sommer	Scuderia Ferrari	Ferrari 166 SC	Ferrari Colombo	006I	
10	(France) Roger Loyer	Ecurie de Paris	Cisitalia D46	Fiat	019	
12	(France) Guy Michelet (France) 'Robert' ?	Ecurie de Paris	Cisitalia D46	Fiat	025	
14	(Belgium) Eugène Martin	Eugène Martin	Frazer Nash	BMW Martin Spécial		
16	(France) René Bonnet	Ecurie Deutsch et Bonnet	Deutsch Bonnet	Citroën	6	
18	(United States) Harry Schell	Ecurie Bleue	Todd Spéciale	BMW		
20	(Italy) Federico Parriani	Scuderia Milan	Cisitalia D46	Fiat		
22	(Italy) Ernesto Bianchi	Scuderia Milan	Cisitalia D46	Fiat		
24	(France) Raymond de Saugé	Raymond de Saugé	Cisitalia D46	Fiat	010	
26	(France) Robert Manzon	Robert Manzon	Cisitalia D46	Fiat	004	
28	(France) Raoul Martin	Raoul Martin	Simca Martin Spéciale	Simca	2	
30	(Belgium) Georges Berger (Belgium) Eugène Martin	Georges Berger	Jicey 1	BMW	1	
32	(France) Mercier ?	Mercier	Fiat Spéciale	Fiat		
34	(France) René Berté	Alain Berté	Berté Spéciale	Opel	1	
36	(France) Charles Huc	Charles Huc	Simca JR Spéciale			
38	(France) Maurice Varet	Maurice Varet	MG	MG		
	(France) Louis Rosier	Ecurie Rosier	Simca JR Spéciale			

Entrant in italic were not present.

== Classification ==
=== Heat 1 ===
Pos	No	Driver	Car	Laps	Time/Retired	Grid
1	2	(France) Jean-Pierre Wimille	Simca-Gordini T15/T1430	27	42:55.6	
2	8	(France) Raymond Sommer	Ferrari 166 SC	27	43:18.3	
3	16	(France) René Bonnet	DB - Citroën	20	+ 7 laps	
4	30	(Belgium) Georges Berger (France) Eugène Martin	Jicey 1 - BMW	19	+8 laps	
5	28	(France) Raoul Martin	Simca Martin Spéciale	18	+9 laps	
Ret	18	(United States) Harry Schell	Todd Spéciale - BMW	14	Overheating	
Ret	20	(Italy) Federico Parriani	Cisitalia D46 - Fiat	12	Valve	
Ret	10	(France) Roger Loyer	Cisitalia D46 - Fiat	11	Engine	
Ret	32	(France) Mercier	Jicey 1 - BMW	5	?	

=== Heat 2 ===
Pos	No	Driver	Car	Laps	Time/Retired	Grid
1	6	(France) Maurice Trintignant	Simca-Gordini T11/T1430	27	45:01.4	
2	14	(France) Eugène Martin	Frazer Nash - BMW Martin Spl	27	46:18.6	
3	4	(Italy) Igor Troubetzkoy	Simca-Gordini T11/T1220	27	46:39.4	
4	26	(France) Robert Manzon	Cisitalia D46 - Fiat	26	+1 lap	
5	12	(France) 'Robert'	Cisitalia D46 - Fiat	24	+3 laps	
6	36	(France) Charles Huc	Simca - JR Spéciale	24	+3 laps	
7	34	(France) René Berté	Berté Spéciale - Opel	24	+3 laps	
Ret	22	(Italy) Ernesto Bianchi	Cisitalia D46 - Fiat	18	Valve	
Ret	24	(France) Raymond de Saugé	Cisitalia D46 - Fiat	?	?	

=== Final ===
Pos	No	Driver	Car	Laps	Time/Retired	Grid
1	6	(France) Maurice Trintignant	Simca-Gordini T11/T1430	40	1:04:08.8	
2	26	(France) Robert Manzon	Cisitalia D46 - Fiat	39	+1 lap	
3	8	(France) Raymond Sommer	Ferrari 166 SC	38	+2 laps	
4	4	(Italy) Igor Troubetzkoy	Simca-Gordini T11/T1220	38	+2 laps	
5	16	(France) René Bonnet	DB - Citroën	36	+4 laps	
6	36	(France) Charles Huc	Simca - JR Spéciale	35	+5 laps	
7	34	(France) René Berté	Berté Spéciale - Opel	30	+10 laps	
Ret	2	(France) Jean-Pierre Wimille	Simca-Gordini T15/T1430	30	Engine	
Ret	12	(France) Guy Michelet	Cisitalia D46 - Fiat	?	?	
Ret	30	(Belgium) Georges Berger	Jicey 1 - BMW	12	?	
Ret	14	(France) Eugène Martin	Frazer Nash - BMW Martin Spéciale	10	Clutch	

- Pole position: ?
- Fastest lap: Maurice Trintignant in 1:32.9

Grand Prix Race
1948 Grand Prix season
Previous race: 1947 Roussillon Grand Prix	Roussillon Grand Prix	Next race: 1949 Roussillon Grand Prix
