= 1947 Nice Grand Prix =

Race details
- Date: 20 July 1947
- Official name: VI Grand Prix de Nice
- Location: Nice, France
- Course: Street circuit
- Course length: 3.213 kilometres (1.996 miles)
- Distance: 100 laps, 321.3 kilometres (199.6 miles)

Pole position
Driver	(Italy) Luigi Villoresi	Maserati
- Time: 1:43.3

Fastest lap
Driver	(France) Raymond Sommer	Maserati
- Time: 1:44.0

Podium
First	(Italy) Luigi Villoresi	Maserati
Second	(France) Jean-Pierre Wimille	Simca Gordini
Third	(United Kingdom) Fred Ashmore (United Kingdom) Reg Parnell	ERA

The 6th Grand Prix de Nice was a Grand Prix motor race held at Nice in France on 20 July 1947. The race was won by Luigi Villoresi, who started from pole, in a Maserati 4CL. Jean-Pierre Wimille was second in a Simca Gordini Type 15 and Fred Ashmore and Reg Parnell shared third place in an ERA A-Type, Parnell's own car having retired with gearbox problems. Raymond Sommer set fastest lap in a Maserati 4CL but retired after his car caught fire.

== Classification ==
Pos	No	Driver	Car	Time/Retired	Grid
1	12	(Italy) Luigi Villoresi	Maserati 4CL	3:07:07.1 (102.87 km/h)	1
2	28	(France) Jean-Pierre Wimille	Simca Gordini Type 15	+2 laps	11
3	10	(United Kingdom) Fred Ashmore (United Kingdom) Reg Parnell	ERA A-Type	+2 laps	12
4	14	(Italy) Alberto Ascari	Maserati 4CL	+3 laps	3
5	34	(France) Charles Pozzi	Delahaye 135	+5 laps	15
6	4	(France) Louis Rosier	Talbot-Lago 150SS	+7 laps	14
7	8	(United Kingdom) Leslie Brooke	ERA B-Type	+13 laps	20
8	22	(France) Eugène Chaboud	Delahaye 135S	+33 laps	6
Ret	6	(United Kingdom) Reg Parnell	Maserati 4CL	59 laps, selector rod	8
Ret	26	(France) Henri Louveau	Maserati 4CL	46 laps, magneto	13
Ret	42	(France) Pierre Levegh	Maserati 4CL	46 laps, engine	9
Ret	24	(France) "Raph"	Maserati 4CL	43 laps, spun off	7
Ret	30	(Monaco) Louis Chiron	Talbot-Lago T26	38 laps, gasket	5
Ret	38	(France) Raymond Sommer	Maserati 4CL	28 laps, fire	2
Ret	16	(Switzerland) Emmanuel de Graffenried	Maserati 4CL	18 laps, engine	4
Ret	18	(Switzerland) Adolphe Mandirola	Maserati 8CM	16 laps, engine	19
Ret	2	(United Kingdom) Kenneth Evans	Maserati 6CM	8 laps, selector rod	16
Ret	20	(Switzerland) Fred Meyer	Maserati 4CL	5 laps, ignition	17
Ret	32	(France) Yves Giraud-Cabantous	Talbot-Lago 26SS	5 laps, cylinder head	10
DNS	36	(France) Benoit Falchetto	Bugatti Type 35		18

Grand Prix Race
1947 Grand Prix season
Previous race: 1946 Nice Grand Prix	Nice Grand Prix	Next race: —
