= 1947 Salon Grand Prix =

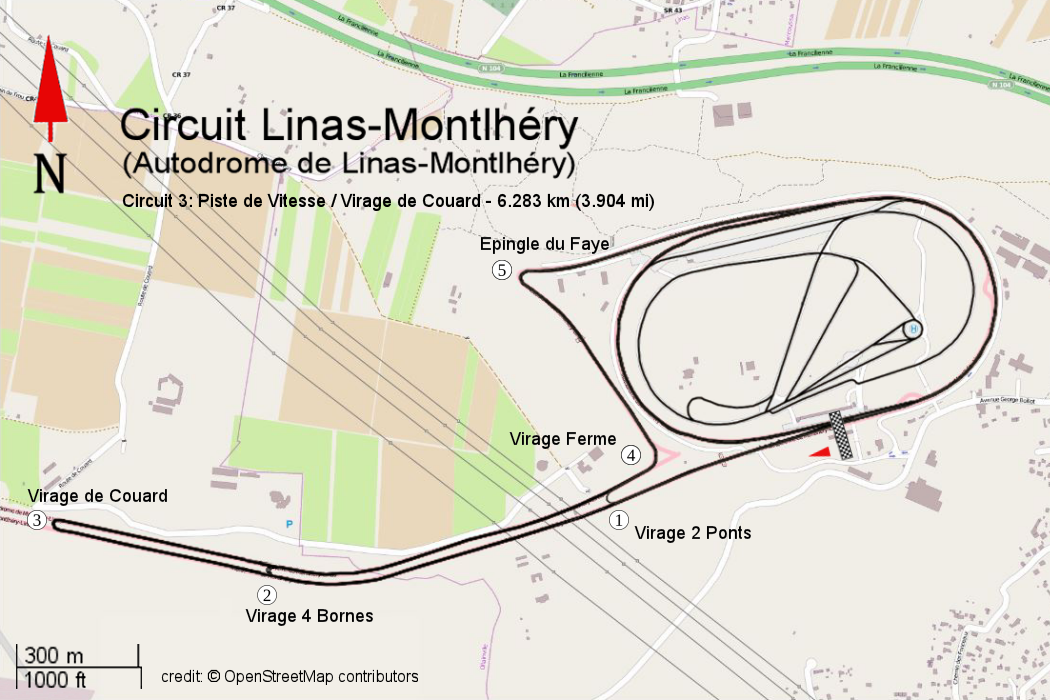

Race details
- Date: 16 November 1947
- Official name: III Grand Prix du Salon
- Location: Montlhéry, Paris
- Course: Permanent racing facility
- Course length: 6.282 km (3.903 mi)
- Distance: 48 laps, 301.543 km (187.370 mi)

Pole position
Driver	(Monaco) Louis Chiron	Talbot-Lago
- Time: 2:36.0

Fastest lap
Driver	(France) Raymond Sommer	Maserati
- Time: 2:29.4

Podium
First	(France) Yves Giraud-Cabantous	Talbot-Lago
Second	(France) Eugène Chaboud	Talbot-Lago
Third	(France) Charles Pozzi	Delahaye

The 3rd Grand Prix du Salon was a Formula One motor race held on 16 November 1947 at the Autodrome de Linas-Montlhéry, in Montlhéry near Paris.

The 48-lap race was won by Talbot-Lago driver Yves Giraud-Cabantous. Eugène Chaboud in another Talbot-Lago was second and Charles Pozzi was third in a Delahaye. Talbot-Lago driver Louis Chiron started from pole but failed to finish, as did Raymond Sommer who set fastest lap in a Maserati.

== Results ==
Pos	No.	Driver	Entrant	Constructor	Time/Retired	Grid
1	8	(France) Yves Giraud-Cabantous	Ecurie France	Talbot-Lago T26C	2:06:28.2, 142.83kph	2
2	2	(France) Eugène Chaboud	Eugène Chaboud	Talbot-Lago T26SS	+3 laps	3
3	12	(France) Charles Pozzi	Charles Pozzi	Delahaye 135S	+3 laps	4
4	16	(France) Alexis Constantin	Alexis Constantin	Delage 3L	+3 laps	8
5	6	(France) Henri Louveau	Henri Louveau	Maserati 4CL	+3 laps	5
6	4	(France) Louis Rosier	Ecurie Rosier	Talbot-Lago T150SS	+5 laps	6
7	42	(France) 'Robert'	'Robert'	Fiat	+5 laps	12
8	54	(France) René Bonnet	Deutsch et Bonnet	DB-Citroen	+8 laps	10
9	20	(France) Pierre Meyrat	Pierre Meyrat	Delahaye 135S	+16 laps	9
Ret	40	(France) Roger Loyer	Roger Loyer	Maserati 4CM	24 laps, rear axle	11
Ret	10	(Monaco) Louis Chiron	Ecurie France	Talbot-Lago T26C	18 laps, transmission	1
Ret	22	(France) Raymond Sommer	Raymond Sommer	Maserati 4CL	18 laps, engine	7
Ret	44	(France) André Boyer	Ecurie France	Cisitalia D46-Fiat	3 laps, retired	15
Ret	50	(France) 'Jannin'	'Jannin'	Testa d'Oro-Fiat	1 lap, retired	16
DNS	28	(France) 'Vedor'	'Vedor'	Talbot-Lago T26C		14
DNS	36	(France) Emile Cornet	Emile Cornet	Delage 3L		13

Grand Prix Race
Previous race: 1947 Lausanne Grand Prix	1947 Grand Prix season Grandes Épreuves	Next race: 1948 Buenos Aires Grand Prix (I)
Previous race: 1946 Salon Grand Prix	Salon Grand Prix	Next race: 1948 Salon Grand Prix
