= 1946 Marseille Grand Prix =

Race details
- Date: 13 May 1946
- Official name: V Grand Prix de Marseille
- Location: Marseille, France
- Course: Prado Street circuit
- Course length: 3.589 km (2.23 miles)
- Distance: 35 laps, 125.615 km (78.054 miles)

Pole position
Driver	(France) Raymond Sommer	Maserati
- Grid positions set by heat results

Fastest lap
Driver	(France) Raymond Sommer	Maserati
- Time: 2:09.5 (99.771 km/h)

Podium
First	(France) Raymond Sommer	Maserati
Second	(Italy) Enrico Platé	Maserati
Third	(France) Georges Grignard	Delahaye

The 1946 Marseille Grand Prix (formally the V Grand Prix de Marseille) was a Grand Prix motor race held at Marseille on 13 May 1946. The event included 2 x 15 lap heats followed by a 35 lap final.

== Classification ==
Pos	No	Driver	Car	Laps	Time/Retired	Heat	Heat Pos
1	2	(France) Raymond Sommer	Maserati 4CL	35	1:20:37.7 (93.477 km/h)	2	1
2	26	(Italy) Enrico Platé	Maserati 4CL	34	+1 lap	2	2
3	38	(France) Georges Grignard	Delahaye 135S	34	+1 laps	1	3
4	10	(France) Arialdo Ruggieri	Maserati 4CL	34	+1 laps	1	ret
5	14	(Switzerland) Emmanuel de Graffenried	Maserati 4CL	33	+2 laps	2	3
6	40	(France) Roger Hillier	Delahaye 135S	33	+2 laps	2	5
7	4	(France) Eugène Chaboud	Delahaye 135S	32	+3 laps	1	2
Ret	16	(Italy) Ciro Basadonna	Maserati 4CL	26	?	1	6
Ret	36	(France) Paul Friderich	Delahaye 135S	5	Fire	1	4
Ret	34	(France) Robert Mazaud	Maserati 4CL	1	Accident	1	1
Ret	46	(France) Jean Lucas	Alfa Romeo 8C 2300	0	Clutch	2	6
DNS	32	(United States) Harry Schell	Maserati 6CM			1	5
DNS	50	(France) Marcel Balsa	Bugatti T51			2	4
DNQ	6	(Italy) Tazio Nuvolari	Maserati 4CL			2	Ret
DNQ	8	(Italy) Franco Cortese	Maserati 4CL			1	Ret
DNQ	12	(Netherlands) Philippe Verkade	Maserati 4CL			1	Crashed
DNQ	18	(France) Alexis Constantin	Maserati 26			1	Ret
DNQ	30	(France) Henri Louveau	Maserati 6CM			2	Ret
DNQ	42	(France) Pierre Larrue	Delahaye 135S			1	Ret
DNQ	48	(France) Maurice Trintignant	Bugatti T35C/51			2	Ret
DNQ	58	(France) Eugène Martin	BMW 328 Martin Spécial			1	Crashed
DNQ	62	(Italy) Discoride Lanza	Maserati 6CM			2	Ret
DNQ	64	(Italy) Ugo Puma	Maserati 6CM			2	Ret
DNA	20	(France) Roger Deho	Maserati 6CM				
DNA	22	(France) Clemente Biodetti	Maserati 4CL				
DNA	24	(Italy) Luigi Plate	Maserati 4CL				
DNA	28	(Italy) Mario Venturelli	Alfa Romeo 8C 2300				
DNA	44	(France) Maurice Varet	Alfa Romeo 8C 2300				
DNA	52	(Italy) Gianpierro Bianchetti	Bugatti 51A				
DNA	54	(France) Jean Achard	Bugatti 35				
DNA	56	(France) Marceron	Bugatti 35				
DNA	60	(France) Roger Wormser	Delahaye 135S				
DNA	66	(France) Georges Raph	Maserati 4CL				
DNA	68	(France) Louis Gerard	Maserati 8C-3000				
DNA	70	(United Kingdom) Charles Lucas	Bugatti 35				
DNA	72	(France) Henri Trillaud	Maserati 26				

Grand Prix Race
1946 Grand Prix season
Previous race: ?	Marseille Grand Prix	Next race: 1947 Marseille Grand Prix
