= 1947 Italian Grand Prix =

Race details
- Date: 7 September 1947
- Official name: XVII Gran Premio d'Italia
- Location: Portello, Milan
- Course: Public roads
- Course length: 3.447 km (2.142 miles)
- Distance: 100 laps, 344.728 km (214.204 miles)

Pole position
Driver	(Italy) Consalvo Sanesi	Alfa Romeo
- Time: 1:44.0

Fastest lap
Driver	(Italy) Carlo Felice Trossi	Alfa Romeo
- Time: 1:44.0

Podium
First	(Italy) Carlo Felice Trossi	Alfa Romeo
Second	(Italy) Achille Varzi	Alfa Romeo
Third	(Italy) Consalvo Sanesi	Alfa Romeo

The 1947 Italian Grand Prix was a Grand Prix motor race held in Portello district on 7 September 1947.

== Entries ==
No	Driver	Entrant	Constructor	Chassis
2	(Italy) Alessandro Gaboardi	Alfa Romeo SpA	Alfa Romeo	Alfa Romeo 158
4	(Italy) Nello Pagani	Scuderia Milano	Maserati	Maserati 4CL
6	(Italy) Luigi Villoresi	Scuderia Ambrosiana	Maserati	Maserati 4CLT
8	(France) Raymond Sommer	Private	Maserati	Maserati 4CL
10	(Italy) Lamberto Grolla	Private	Cisitalia	Cisitalia D46 – Fiat
12	(France) Eugène Chaboud	Private	Delahaye	Delahaye 135S
14	(France) Pierre Levegh	Ecurie Naphtra Course	Maserati	Maserati 4CL
16	(Italy) Achille Varzi	Alfa Romeo SpA	Alfa Romeo	Alfa Romeo 158
18	(Monaco) Louis Chiron	Enrico Platé	Maserati	Maserati 4CL
22	(France) Charles Pozzi	Private	Delahaye	Delahaye 135S
24	(Italy) Consalvo Sanesi	Alfa Romeo SpA	Alfa Romeo	Alfa Romeo 158
26	(Thailand) Prince Bira	Scuderia Milano	Maserati	Maserati 4CL
28	(Italy) Giovanni Bracco	Private	Delage	Delage 3000
30	(Italy) Carlo Felice Trossi	Alfa Romeo SpA	Alfa Romeo	Alfa Romeo 158
32	(Switzerland) Toulo de Graffenried	Private	Maserati	Maserati 4CL
34	(Italy) Alberto Ascari	Scuderia Ambrosiana	Maserati	Maserati 4CL
36	(France) "Raph"	Ecurie Naphtra Course	Maserati	Maserati 4CL
38	(Italy) Arialdo Ruggeri	Scuderia Milano	Maserati	Maserati 4CL
42	(Italy) Gaetano dell'Acqua	Private	Maserati	Maserati 6CM
44	(Italy) Carlo Pesci	Private	Maserati	Maserati 6CM
46	(Italy) Giovanni Minozzi	Private	Maserati	Maserati 6CM
48	(Italy) Renato Balestrero	Private	Maserati	Maserati
52	(Italy) Lorenzo Arrigoni	Private	Maserati	Maserati 6CM
54	(France) Henri Louveau	Ecurie Gersac	Delage	Delage D6.70
56	(Italy) Mario Porrino	Private	Cisitalia	Cisitalia D46 – Fiat

== Classification ==
=== Qualifying ===
Pos	No	Driver	Constructor	Lap Time
1	24	(Italy) Consalvo Sanesi	Alfa Romeo	1:44.0
2	30	(Italy) Carlo Felice Trossi	Alfa Romeo	1:44.8
3	6	(Italy) Luigi Villoresi	Maserati	1:45.4
4	16	(Italy) Achille Varzi	Alfa Romeo	1:47.0
5	34	(Italy) Alberto Ascari	Maserati	1:47.2
6	18	(Monaco) Louis Chiron	Maserati	1:47.6
7	8	(France) Raymond Sommer	Maserati	1:47.6
8	32	(Switzerland) Toulo de Graffenried	Maserati	1:48.8
9	2	(Italy) Alessandro Gaboardi	Alfa Romeo	1:51.8
10	14	(France) Pierre Levegh	Maserati	1:53.6
11	52	(Italy) Lorenzo Arrigoni	Maserati	1:58.6
12	36	(France) "Raph"	Maserati	1:58.8
13	12	(France) Eugène Chaboud	Delahaye	1:59.8
14	22	(France) Charles Pozzi	Delahaye	2:00.2
15	38	(Italy) Arialdo Ruggeri	Maserati	2:00.8
16	46	(Italy) Giovanni Minozzi	Maserati	2:00.8
17	42	(Italy) Gaetano dell'Acqua	Maserati	2:01.4
18	28	(Italy) Giovanni Bracco	Delage	2:01.5
19	10	(Italy) Lamberto Grolla	Cisitalia-Fiat	2:03.4
20	56	(Italy) Mario Porrino	Cisitalia-Fiat	2:03.6
21	44	(Italy) Carlo Pesci	Maserati	2:03.8
22	54	(France) Henri Louveau	Delage	2:05.8
23	26	(Thailand) Prince Bira	Maserati	2:06.0
24	4	(Italy) Nello Pagani	Maserati	2:10.0

=== Race ===
Pos	No	Driver	Constructor	Laps	Time/Retired	Grid
1	30	(Italy) Carlo Felice Trossi	Alfa Romeo	100	3:02:25.0	2
2	16	(Italy) Achille Varzi	Alfa Romeo	100	+0.1	4
3	24	(Italy) Consalvo Sanesi	Alfa Romeo	99	+1 Lap	1
4	2	(Italy) Alessandro Gaboardi	Alfa Romeo	95	+5 Laps	9
5	34	(Italy) Alberto Ascari	Maserati	94	+6 Laps	5
6	54	(France) Henri Louveau	Delage	91	+9 Laps	22
7	22	(France) Charles Pozzi	Delahaye	89	+11 Laps	14
8	12	(France) Eugène Chaboud	Delahaye	87	+13 Laps	13
9	44	(Italy) Carlo Pesci	Maserati	84	+16 Laps	21
Ret	56	(Italy) Mario Porrino	Cisitalia-Fiat	56		20
Ret	52	(Italy) Lorenzo Arrigoni	Maserati	56		11
Ret	10	(Italy) Lamberto Grolla	Cisitalia-Fiat	56		19
Ret	28	(Italy) Giovanni Bracco	Delage	53		18
Ret	6	(Italy) Luigi Villoresi	Maserati	53	Brakes	3
Ret	42	(Italy) Gaetano dell'Acqua	Maserati	23		17
Ret	8	(France) Raymond Sommer	Maserati	20	Engine	7
Ret	14	(France) Pierre Levegh	Maserati	6		10
Ret	36	(France) "Raph"	Maserati	3	Oil pipe	12
Ret	4	(Italy) Nello Pagani	Maserati	2	Tyres	24
Ret	26	(Thailand) Prince Bira	Maserati	0	Supercharger	23
Ret	18	(Monaco) Louis Chiron	Maserati			6
Ret	32	(Switzerland) Toulo de Graffenried	Maserati			8
DNS	38	(Italy) Arialdo Ruggeri	Maserati			15
DNS	46	(Italy) Giovanni Minozzi	Maserati			16

Grand Prix Race
Previous race: 1947 Belgian Grand Prix	1947 Grand Prix season Grandes Épreuves	Next race: 1947 French Grand Prix
Previous race: 1938 Italian Grand Prix	Italian Grand Prix	Next race: 1948 Italian Grand Prix
