= 1949 Salon Grand Prix =

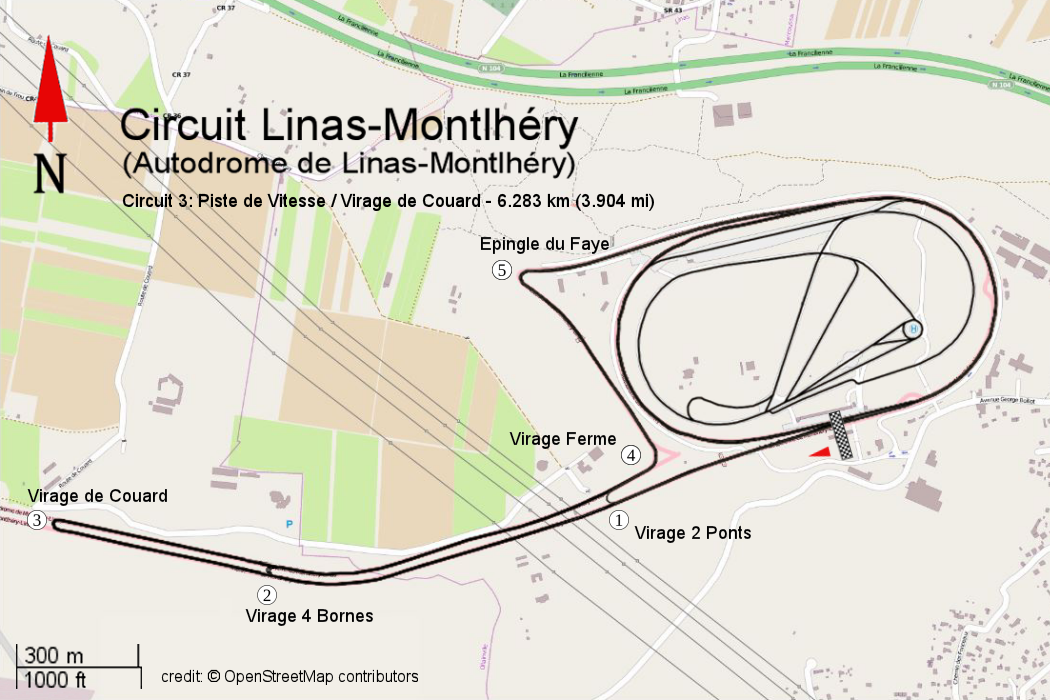

Race details
- Date: 9 October 1949
- Official name: V Grand Prix du Salon
- Location: Montlhéry, France
- Course: Permanent racing facility
- Course length: 6.283 km (3.904 mi)
- Distance: 64 laps, 402.13 km (249.87 mi)

Pole position
Driver	(France) Georges Grignard	Talbot-Lago
- Time: 2:25.1

Fastest lap
Driver	(France) Raymond Sommer	Talbot-Lago
- Time: 2:23.8

Podium
First	(France) Raymond Sommer	Talbot-Lago
Second	(United States) Harry Schell	Talbot-Lago
Third	(France) Pierre Meyrat	Talbot-Lago

The 5th Grand Prix du Salon was a Formula One motor race held on 9 October 1949 at the Autodrome de Linas-Montlhéry, in Montlhéry near Paris, France.

The 64-lap race was won by Talbot-Lago driver Raymond Sommer, who also set fastest lap. Harry Schell and Pierre Meyrat, also in Talbot-Lagos, were second and third.

== Results ==
Pos	No.	Driver	Entrant	Constructor	Time/Retired	Grid
1	6	(France) Raymond Sommer	Raymond Sommer	Talbot-Lago T26C	2:42:18, 148.67kph	9
2	7	(United States) Harry Schell	Ecurie France	Talbot-Lago T26C	+2:10	5
3	14	(France) Pierre Meyrat	Ecurie Lutetia	Talbot-Lago Spéciale	+4 laps	10
4	26	(France) Charles Pozzi	Ecurie Lutetia	Delahaye 135	+5 laps	8
5	20	(France) Louis Gérard	Louis Gérard	Delage D6	+7 laps	12
6	23	(France) Jean Behra	Ecurie France	Talbot-Lago T26C	+8 laps	6
7	21	(France) Marc Versini	Marc Versini	Delage D6	+10 laps	13
8	17	(France) Jean Lucas	H. Louveau	Delage D6	+11 laps	18
9	16	(France) Charles Huc	Charles Huc	Talbot-Lago Spéciale	+13 laps	16
Ret	19	(France) Georges Grignard	Georges Grignard	Talbot-Lago T26C	31 laps	1
Ret	5	(France) Guy Mairesse	Ecurie France	Talbot-Lago T26C	31 laps	4
Ret	24	(France) Jean Judet	Jean Judet	Maserati 4CL	13 laps, supercharger	14
Ret	8	(United Kingdom) Gordon Watson	G.M. Watson	Alta IFS	9 laps, transmission	11
Ret	9	(United Kingdom) Peter Whitehead	P.N. Whitehead	Ferrari 125	0 laps, accident	7
Ret	4	(France) Pierre Levegh	Pierre Levegh	Talbot-Lago T26C	0 laps, accident	3
Ret	3	(France) Yves Giraud-Cabantous	Automobiles Talbot-Darracq	Talbot-Lago T26C	0 laps, accident	2
Ret	18	(United States) Alexander Orley	Alexander Orley	Veritas-BMW 328		15
Ret	10	(France) René Simone	René Bonnet	DB-Citroen		17
DNS	17	(France) Henri Louveau	H. Louveau	Delage D6	Car driven by Lucas	
DNS	20	(France) Maurice Varet	Louis Gérard	Delage D6	Car driven by Gérard	
DNS	15	(France) Eugène Chaboud	Ecurie Letitia	Veritas-BMW 328	Crashed	
DNA	1	(France) Philippe Étancelin	P. Étancelin	Talbot-Lago T26C		
DNA	2	(France) Louis Rosier	Ecurie Rosier	Talbot-Lago T26C		
DNA	10	(France) René Bonnet	René Bonnet	DB-Citroen	Car driven by Simone	
DNA	11	(Spain) Francisco Godia Sales	F. Godia Sales	Maserati 4CL		
DNA	12	(Spain) Juan Jover Sañés	Juan Jover Sañés	Maserati 4CL		
DNA	22	(France) Mariotti	Mariotti	Simca Gordini		
DNA	25	(France) Vallas	Vallas	Maserati		

Grand Prix Race
Previous race: 1949 Czechoslovakian Grand Prix	1949 Grand Prix season Grandes Épreuves	Next race: 1950 Pau Grand Prix
Previous race: 1948 Salon Grand Prix	Salon Grand Prix	Next race: 1950 Salon Grand Prix
