= 1946 Grand Prix season =

First post-war year for Grand Prix motor racing

Seasons
- ← 1940–1945 1947 →

The 1946 Grand Prix season was the first post-war year for Grand Prix motor racing. It was notable for including the first ever race run to the future Formula One criteria which would come into effect on 1 January 1947, the 1946 Turin Grand Prix. There was no organised championship in 1946, although Raymond Sommer proved to be the most successful driver, winning five Grands Prix. Maserati's cars proved difficult to beat, winning 9 of the season's 18 Grand Prix races.

== Season review ==
=== Grands Prix ===
Date	Name	Circuit	Winning driver	Winning constructor	Report
22 April	(France) Nice Grand Prix	Nice	(Italy) Luigi Villoresi	Maserati	Report
12 May	(France) Marseille Grand Prix	Prado	(France) Raymond Sommer	Maserati	Report
19 May	(France) Forez Grand Prix	St Just-Andrezieux	(France) Raymond Sommer	Maserati	Report
30 May	(France) Paris Cup	Bois de Boulogne	(France) Jean-Pierre Wimille	Alfa Romeo	Report
8 June	(Belgium) Grand Prix des Frontières	Chimay	(United Kingdom) Leslie Brooke	ERA	Report
9 June	(France) René le Bègue Cup	Saint-Cloud	(France) Raymond Sommer	Maserati	Report
15 June	(United Kingdom) Gransden Lodge Trophy	Gransden Lodge	(United Kingdom) George Abecassis	Bugatti	Report
30 June	(France) Roussillon Grand Prix	Perpignan	(France) Jean-Pierre Wimille	Alfa Romeo	Report
7 July	(France) Burgundy Grand Prix	Dijon	(France) Jean-Pierre Wimille	Alfa Romeo	Report
14 July	(France) Albi Grand Prix	Albi (Les Planques)	(Italy) Tazio Nuvolari	Maserati	Report
21 July	(Switzerland) Nations Grand Prix	Geneva	(Italy) Giuseppe Farina	Alfa Romeo	Report
28 July	(France) Nantes Grand Prix	Nantes	(France) "Raph"	Maserati	Report
10 August	(United Kingdom) Ulster Trophy	Ballyclare	(Thailand) Prince Bira	ERA	Report
25 August	(France) Circuit des Trois Villes	Lille	(France) Raymond Sommer	Maserati	Report
25 August	(France) Circuit des Trois Villes	Lille	(France) Henri Louveau	Maserati	Report
1 September	(Italy) Turin Grand Prix	Valentino Park	(Italy) Achille Varzi	Alfa Romeo	Report
30 September	(Italy) Milan Grand Prix	Parco Sempione	(Italy) Carlo Felice Trossi	Alfa Romeo	Report
6 October	(France) Coupe du Salon	Bois de Boulogne	(France) Raymond Sommer	Maserati	Report
27 October	(Spain) Penya Rhin Grand Prix	Pedralbes	(Italy) Giorgio Pelassa	Maserati	Report

== Statistics ==
=== Grand Prix winners ===
Driver	Wins
(France) Raymond Sommer	5
(France) Jean-Pierre Wimille	3
(United Kingdom) George Abecassis	1
(France) "Raph"	1
(Thailand) Prince Bira	1
(United Kingdom) Leslie Brooke	1
(Italy) Giuseppe Farina	1
(France) Henri Louveau	1
(Italy) Tazio Nuvolari	1
(Italy) Giorgio Pelassa	1
(Italy) Carlo Felice Trossi	1
(Italy) Achille Varzi	1
(Italy) Luigi Villoresi	1

==== Manufacturers ====
Manufacturer	Wins
(Italy) Maserati	9
(Italy) Alfa Romeo	6
(United Kingdom) ERA	2
(France) Bugatti	1
