= 1947 Rio de Janeiro Grand Prix =

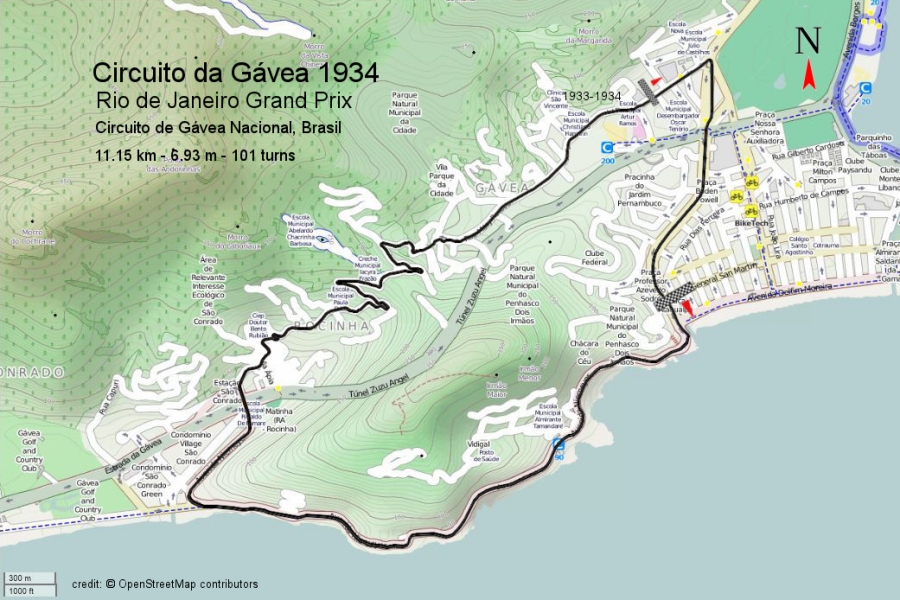

Race details
- Date: 20 April 1947
- Official name: VIII Grande Prêmio da Cidade de Rio de Janeiro
- Location: Gávea, Rio de Janeiro
- Course: Temporary road circuit
- Course length: 10.77 km (6.69 mi)
- Distance: 15 laps, 161.595 km (100.410 mi)

Pole position
Driver	(Italy) Luigi Villoresi	Maserati
- Time: 7:26.1

Podium
First	(Brazil) Chico Landi	Alfa Romeo
Second	(Italy) Luigi Villoresi	Maserati
Third	(France) George Raph	Maserati

The VIII Grande Prêmio da Cidade de Rio de Janeiro was a Grand Prix motor race held on 20 April 1947 at the Gávea street circuit in Rio de Janeiro, Brazil. The race was planned over 20 laps but was reduced to 15 because of rain. Chico Landi won while driving an Alfa Romeo 308. Luigi Villoresi, in a Maserati 4CL started from pole and finished second. George Raph came in third with a Maserati 6CM.

== Classification ==
Pos	Driver	Car	Time/Retired	Grid
1	(Brazil) Chico Landi	Alfa Romeo 308	2:03:14.5, 78.969kph	2
2	(Italy) Luigi Villoresi	Maserati 4CL	+5:52.9	1
3	(France) George Raph	Maserati 6CM	+1 lap	
4	(Brazil) Hélio Ramos	Alfa Romeo	+1 lap	6
Ret	(Italy) Achille Varzi	Alfa Romeo 308	6 laps	7
Ret	(Brazil) Gino Bianco	Maserati 8CM		3
Ret	(Brazil) Ruben Abrunhosa	Studebaker		5
Ret	(Brazil) Henrique Casini	Maserati		
Ret	(Brazil) João Santos Mauro	Maserati		4
Ret	(Italy) Giacomo Palmieri	Maserati		
Ret	(Brazil) Osmar Lage	Maserati		

Grand Prix Race
Previous race: 1947 Pau Grand Prix	1947 Grand Prix season Grandes Épreuves	Next race: 1947 Roussillon Grand Prix
Previous race: 1941 Rio de Janeiro Grand Prix	Rio de Janeiro Grand Prix	Next race: 1948 Rio de Janeiro Grand Prix
