= 1946 Roussillon Grand Prix =

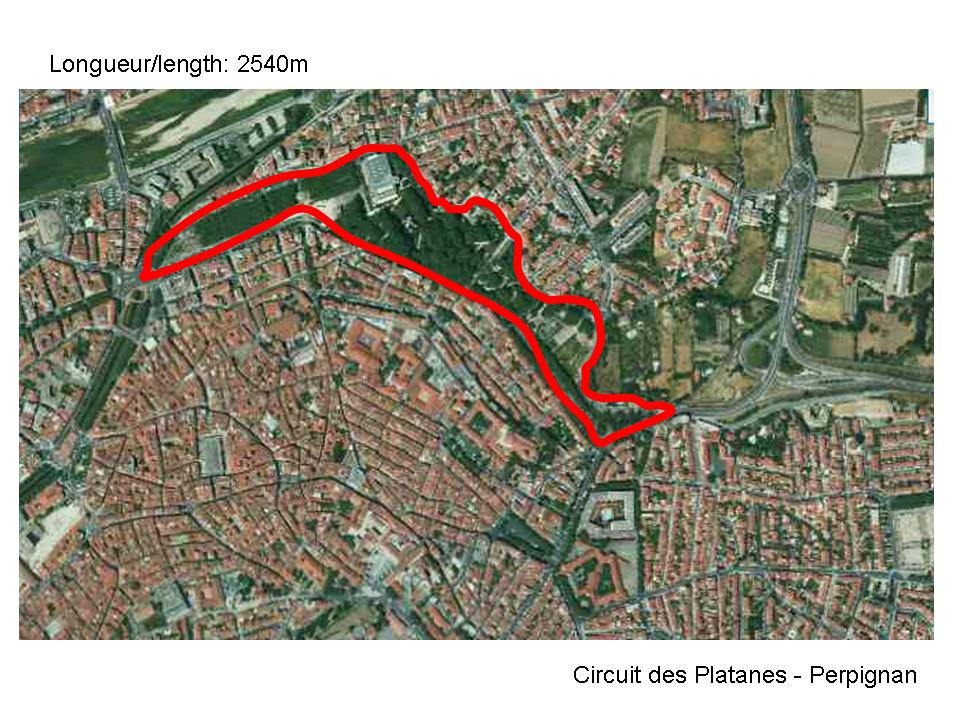

Race details
- Date: 30 June 1946
- Official name: I Grand Prix du Roussillon
- Location: Circuit des platanes de Perpignan; Perpignan, France
- Course: Street circuit
- Course length: 2.217 km (1.378 miles)
- Distance: 68 laps, 150.756 km (93.675 miles)

Pole position
Driver	(France) Jean-Pierre Wimille	Alfa Romeo 308
- Time: ?
- Grid positions set by heat results

Fastest lap
Driver	(France) Raymond Sommer	Maserati 4CL
- Time: 1:36.0

Podium
First	(France) Jean-Pierre Wimille	Alfa Romeo 308
Second	(France) Henri Louveau	Maserati 4CL
Third	(France) Raph	Maserati 4CL

The 1946 Roussillon Grand Prix (formally the I Grand Prix du Roussillon) was a Grand Prix motor race held at Circuit des Platanes de Perpignan on 30 June 1946.

== Entry list ==
No	Driver	Entrant	Car	Engine	Chassis
2	(France) Jean-Pierre Wimille	Ecurie Naphtra Course	Alfa Romeo 308	Alfa Romeo	
4	(United Kingdom) Taso Mathieson	Taso Mathieson	Maserati 8C-3000	Maserati 8C	
6	(France) Eugène Chaboud	Eugène Chaboud	Delahaye 135S	Delahaye	
8	(France) Georges Grignard	Georges Grignard	Delahaye 135S	Delahaye	
10	(France) Louis Villeneuve	Louis Villeneuve	Delahaye 135S	Delahaye	
12	(France) Raymond Sommer	Raymond Sommer	Maserati 6CM	Maserati 4CL	
14	(France) Robert Mazaud	Robert Mazaud	Maserati 4CL	Maserati 4CL	
18	(France) Maurice Trintignant	Maurice Trintignant	Bugatti Type 35C/51	Bugatti 51	
20	(France) Raph	Ecurie Naphtra Course	Maserati 6CM	Maserati 6CM	
15	(France) Henri Louveau	Scuderia Milan	Maserati 6CM	Maserati 4CL	

== Classification ==
Jean-Pierre Wimille and Raymond Sommer held the race until piston troubles show up and oblige the Maserati 4CL to retire. Since then, Wimille wasn't in danger to win the race.

Pos	No	Driver	Car	Laps	Time/Retired	Grid
1	2	(France) Jean-Pierre Wimille	Alfa Romeo 308	68	1:36:31.6 (93.73 km/h)	1
2	24	(France) Henri Louveau	Maserati 6CM/4CL	56	+12 laps	
3	20	(France) Raph	Maserati 6CM	55	+13 laps	
4	8	(France) Georges Grignard	Delahaye 135S	53	+15 laps	
5	18	(France) Maurice Trintignant	Bugatti Type 35C/51	50	+18 laps	
6	4	(United Kingdom) Taso Mathieson	Maserati 8C-3000	49	+19 laps	
7	6	(France) Eugène Chaboud	Delahaye 135S	47	+21 laps	
8	10	(France) Louis Villeneuve	Delahaye 135S	45	+23 laps	
Ret	12	(France) Raymond Sommer	Maserati 6CM/4CL	38	piston	
Ret	14	(France) Robert Mazaud	Maserati 4CL	12	magneto	

- Pole position: Jean-Pierre Wimille in ?
- Fastest lap: Raymond Sommer in 1:36.0 (95.32 km/h).

Grand Prix Race
1946 Grand Prix season
Previous race: none	Roussillon Grand Prix	Next race: 1947 Roussillon Grand Prix
