= 1946 Nice Grand Prix =

Race details
- Date: 22 April 1946
- Official name: V Grand Prix de Nice
- Location: Nice, France
- Course: Street circuit
- Course length: 3.218 km (2.000 miles)
- Distance: 65 laps, 209.170 km (130.000 miles)

Pole position
Driver	(Italy) Luigi Villoresi	Maserati 4CL
- Time: 1:45.0
- Grid positions set by heat results

Fastest lap
Driver	(France) Raymond Sommer	Alfa Romeo 308
- Time: 1:44.8

Podium
First	(Italy) Luigi Villoresi	Maserati
Second	(France) Raymond Sommer	Alfa Romeo
Third	(France) Eugène Chaboud	Delahaye

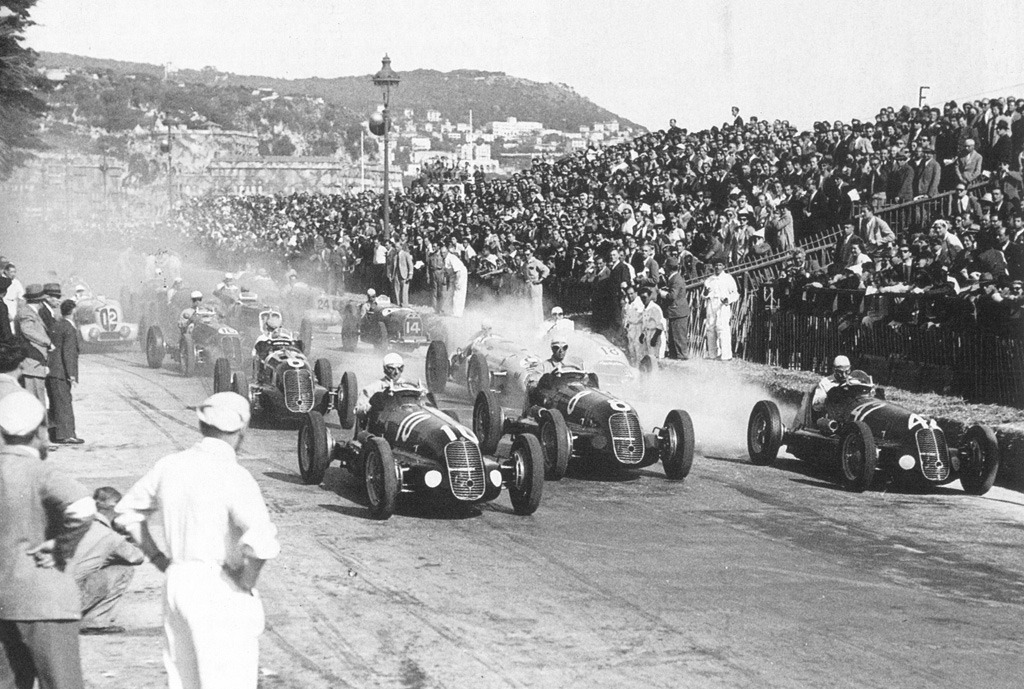
Start of the 1946 Nice Grand Prix

The 1946 Nice Grand Prix (officially the V Grand Prix de Nice) was a Grand Prix motor race held at Nice in France on Monday, 22 April 1946. It was the first race of the 1946 Grand Prix season. According to some sources, this was the first official Formula 1 race.

== Entry list ==
No	Driver	Car	Engine
2	(Monaco) Louis Chiron	Talbot-Lago T26	Talbot-Lago
4	(France) Raymond Sommer	Alfa Romeo 308	Alfa Romeo
6	(France) Philippe Étancelin	Maserati 6CM	Maserati
8	(Italy) Arialdo Ruggieri / (Italy) Franco Cortese	Maserati 4CL	Maserati
10	(Italy) Luigi Villoresi	Maserati 4CL	Maserati
12	(France) Henri Trillaud	Delahaye 135S	Delahaye
14	(France) Maurice Trintignant	Bugatti T35C/51	Bugatti
16	(France) Robert Mazaud	Maserati 4CL	Maserati
18	(France) Eugène Chaboud	Delahaye 135S	Delahaye
20	(France) Henri Louveau	Maserati 6CM	Maserati
22	(France) Pierre Levegh	Talbot-Lago T150C	Talbot-Lago
24	(France) Marcel Balsa	Talbot-Lago T150C	Talbot-Lago
26	(France) Fernand Bianchi	Bugatti T51A	Bugatti
28	(France) Raph	Maserati 4CL	Maserati
30	(Italy) Discoride Lanza	Maserati 4CL	Maserati
32	(France) Georges Grignard	Delahaye 135S	Delahaye
34	(France) Charles Pozzi	Delahaye 135S	Delahaye
36	(France) Maurice Varet	Alfa Romeo 8C-2300	Alfa Romeo
38	(France) Roger Deho	Maserati 6CM	Maserati
40	(United States) Harry Schell	Maserati 6CM	Maserati
42	(Italy) Franco Cortese	Maserati 4CL	Maserati
44	(France) Paul Friderich	Delahaye 155	Delahaye

== Classification ==
Pos	No	Driver	Car	Laps	Time/Retired	Grid
1	10	(Italy) Luigi Villoresi	Maserati	65	2:00:04.5 (104.52 km/h)	1
2	4	(France) Raymond Sommer	Alfa Romeo	64	+1 lap	
3	18	(France) Eugène Chaboud	Delahaye	61	+4 laps	
4	32	(France) Georges Grignard	Delahaye	59	+6 laps	
5	8	(Italy) Arialdo Ruggieri / (Italy) Franco Cortese	Maserati	58	+7 laps	
6	2	(Monaco) Louis Chiron	Talbot-Lago	58	+7 laps	
7	36	(France) Maurice Varet	Alfa Romeo	55	+10 laps	
8	34	(France) Charles Pozzi	Delahaye	51	+14 laps	
9	26	(France) Fernand Bianchi	Bugatti	48	+17 laps	
10	20	(France) Henri Louveau	Maserati	44	+21 laps	
ret	22	(France) Pierre Levegh	Talbot-Lago	41	Rear axle	
ret	14	(France) Maurice Trintignant	Bugatti	30	Ignition	
ret	16	(France) Robert Mazaud	Maserati	22	Magneto	
ret	12	(France) Henri Trillaud	Delahaye	20	Connecting rod	
ret	40	(United States) Harry Schell	Maserati	20	Accident	
ret	28	(France) Raph	Maserati	15		
ret	24	(France) Marcel Balsa	Talbot-Lago	15		
ret	6	(France) Philippe Étançelin	Maserati	8	Magneto	
ret	38	(France) Roger Deho	Maserati	5		
ret	42	(Italy) Franco Cortese	Maserati	0	Supercharger	
DNS	30	(Italy) Discoride Lanza	Maserati	0		
DNS	44	(France) Paul Friderich	Delahaye	0		

- Pole position: Luigi Villoresi in 1:45.0 (110.331 km/h)
- Fastest lap: Raymond Sommer in 1:44.8 (110.542 km/h).
