= 1947 Alsace Grand Prix =

Race details
- Date: 3 August 1947
- Official name: II Grand Prix de l'Alsace
- Location: Strasbourg-Neudorf, France
- Course: Street circuit
- Course length: 2.254 miles (3.627 kilometres)
- Distance: 85 laps, 191.59 miles (308.33 kilometres)

Pole position
Driver	(Italy) Luigi Villoresi	Maserati
- Time: 1:49.5

Fastest lap
Driver	(Italy) Luigi Villoresi	Maserati
- Time: 1:47.2

Podium
First	(Italy) Luigi Villoresi	Maserati
Second	(France) Yves Giraud-Cabantous	Talbot-Lago T26SS
Third	(France) Louis Rosier	Talbot-Lago T150SS

The 2nd Grand Prix de l'Alsace was a Grand Prix motor race held at Strasbourg-Neudorf in France on 3 August 1947. The race was won by Luigi Villoresi, who started from pole and set fastest lap, in a Maserati 4CL. Yves Giraud-Cabantous was second in a Talbot-Lago T26SS and Louis Rosier third in a Talbot-Lago T150SS.

Eugene Chaboud took part in Saturday practice in a mysterious new car, but after inspection the car was banned from the event after it was found that his car was not French as Chaboud pretended, but a German-built Veritas. The Veritas team left the track under military police escort, and Chaboud took part in the race in a Delahaye 135 he drove in Friday practice.

The race was delayed by one hour due to a freak incident involving grand marshal Paul Freiss and 1947 Isle of Man TT podium finisher Peter Goodman in the 500cc bike support race. Freiss was trying to control spectators who had just moved in forbidden areas on the pit straight, and got hit in the leg at high speed by Goodman. Freiss lost his leg on impact, but survived. He remained involved in Alsatian motorsport after the incident. Goodman, who had just won the 350cc support race, was also seriously hurt, and had to retire from professional motorcycle racing.

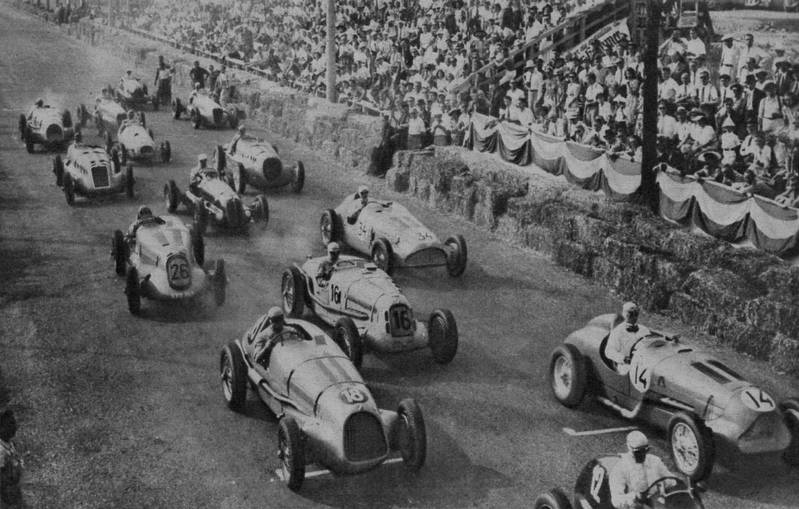
Start of the race

There is still confusion regarding the way grid positions were attributed. Apart from the top 3 positions, the starting order does not entirely fit qualifying times or the event's own rules.

The event received a mixed review from the national press. Several newspapers praised the event for the large crowd (estimated at around 30.000 by the Automobile Club d'Alsace) and interesting races, but others raised concerns about the large number of injured riders, officials and spectators in the 500cc motorcycle race, and many organisational problems. Several cars and bikes had been seen driving the wrong way during the event, and a fight broke out between a marshal and a bike race competitor. The event was also a commercial failure, and the organisers decided against holding another Alsace Grand Prix, or using this track again.

== Classification ==
Pos	No	Driver	Entrant	Car	Time/Retired	Grid
1	8	(Italy) Luigi Villoresi	Scuderia Ambrosiana	Maserati 4CL	2:45:41.9; 111.64 kph	1
2	16	(France) Yves Giraud-Cabantous	Ecurie France	Talbot-Lago T26SS	+1:13.8	6
3	18	(France) Louis Rosier	Louis Rosier	Talbot-Lago T150SS	+3 laps	4
4	22	(France) Henri Louveau	Scuderia Milano	Maserati 4CL	+3 laps	9
5	14	(France) Charles Pozzi	Charles Pozzi	Talbot-Lago T150C	+3 laps	5
6	34	(France) Eugène Chaboud	Eugène Chaboud	Delahaye 135S	+4 laps	8
7	20	(France) "Raph" (France) Pierre Levegh	Ecurie Naphtra Course	Maserati 4CL	+5 laps	16
8	26	(France) Pierre Meyrat	Pierre Meyrat	Delahaye 135S	+10 laps	7
9	28	(France) Edmond Mouche	Edmond Mouche	Talbot-Lago T150C	+13 laps	13
Ret	42	(France) Pierre Levegh	Scuderia Milano	Maserati 4CL		14
Ret	10	(Italy) Alberto Ascari	Scuderia Ambrosiana	Maserati 4CL	Valve	2
Ret	12	(Monaco) Louis Chiron	Ecurie Naphtra Course	Maserati 4CL	Gearbox	3
Ret	24	(Switzerland) Antonio Branca	Fred Meyer	Maserati 4CL		17
Ret	30	(France) Maurice Varet	Henri Louveau	Delage 3L	Engine	10
Ret	32	(France) Jean-Pierre Wimille	Equipe Gordini	Simca Gordini Type 15	Brakes	12
Ret	36	(France) Jean Brault	Jean Brault	Delahaye 135S		11

Grand Prix Race
1947 Grand Prix season
Previous race: 1926 Alsace Grand Prix	Alsace Grand Prix	Next race: —
