= 1948 Salon Grand Prix =

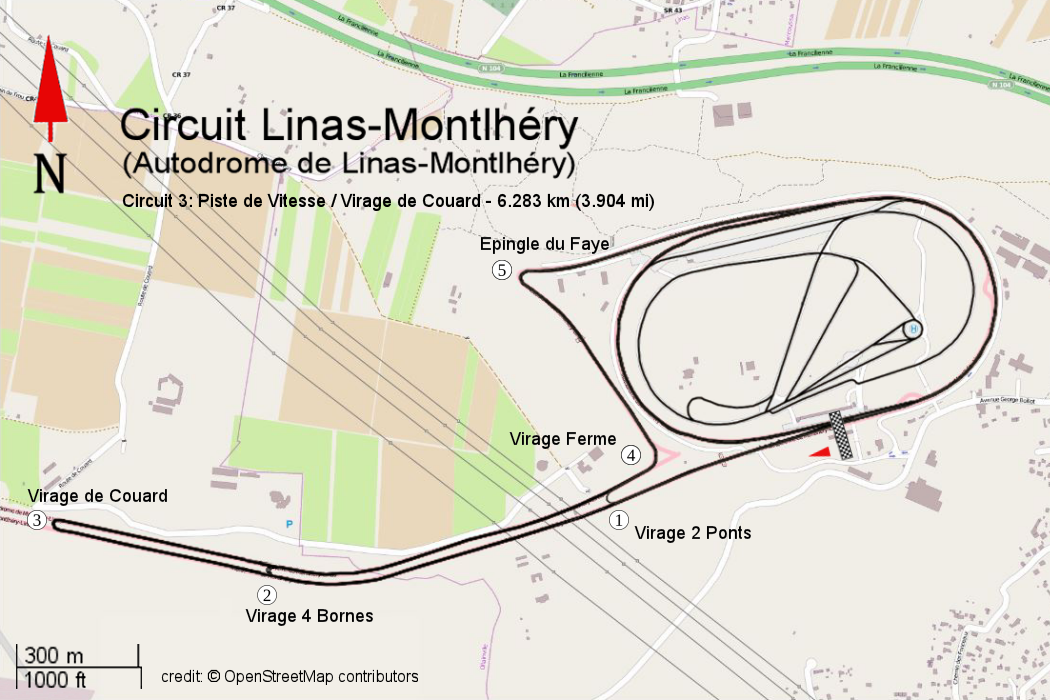

Race details
- Date: 10 October 1948
- Official name: IV Grand Prix du Salon
- Location: Montlhéry, Paris
- Course: Permanent racing facility
- Course length: 6.25 km (3.88 mi)
- Distance: 48 laps, 300.00 km (186.41 mi)

Pole position
Driver	(United Kingdom) Leslie Johnson	ERA
- Time: not known

Fastest lap
Driver	(Thailand) B. Bira	Maserati
- Time: 2:25.9

Podium
First	(France) Louis Rosier	Talbot-Lago
Second	(France) Pierre Levegh	Talbot-Lago
Third	(France) Yves Giraud-Cabantous	Talbot-Lago

The 4th Grand Prix du Salon was a Formula One motor race held on 30 May 1948 at the Autodrome de Linas-Montlhéry, in Montlhéry near Paris.

The 48-lap race was won by Talbot-Lago driver Louis Rosier. Pierre Levegh and Yves Giraud-Cabantous were second and third, also driving Talbot-Lagos. ERA driver Leslie Johnson started from pole but failed to finish, as did B. Bira who set fastest lap in a Maserati.

== Results ==
Pos	No.	Driver	Entrant	Constructor	Time/Retired
1	7	(France) Louis Rosier	Ecurie Rosier	Talbot-Lago T26C	2:03:52.9, 145.74kph
2	8	(France) Pierre Levegh	Pierre Levegh	Talbot-Lago T26C	+1:15.9
3	5	(France) Yves Giraud-Cabantous	Yves Giraud-Cabantous	Talbot-Lago T26C	+2 laps
4	16	(France) Henri Louveau (France) Robert Brunet	Henri Louveau	Maserati 4CL	+3 laps
5	25	(France) Guy Mairesse	Ecurie France	Delahaye 135S	+3 laps
6	28	(Italy) Giuseppe Morra	Giuseppe Morra	Maserati 4CM	+5 laps
7	31	(France) Marc Versini	Marc Versini	Delage 3-litre	+5 laps
8	17	(United Kingdom) Reg Parnell	Reg Parnell	Maserati 4CLT/48	+6 laps
9	20	(France) Robert Manzon	Equipe Gordini	Simca Gordini Type 15	+8 laps
10	15	(Switzerland) Richard Ramseyer	Ecurie Geneve	Maserati 4CM	+14 laps
Ret	19	(France) Igor Troubetzkoy	Equipe Gordini	Simca Gordini Type 15	40 laps
Ret	14	(France) Georges Grignard	Georges Grignard	Talbot-Lago T26C	36 laps
Ret	4	(France) Claude Bernheim (Monaco) Louis Chiron	Ecurie France	Maserati 4CL	33 laps
Ret	18	(United Kingdom) Leslie Johnson	Leslie Johnson	ERA E-Type	3 laps, fuel tank
Ret	3	(Thailand) B. Bira	Prince Chula	Maserati 4CLT/48	Con rod
Ret	6	(Spain) Juan Jover	Scuderia Auto Spagnola	Maserati 4CL	
Ret	10	(Spain) Francisco Godia	Scuderia Auto Spagnola	Maserati 4CL	
Ret	11	(Spain) Salvador Fabregas	Scuderia Auto Spagnola	Maserati 4CL	
Ret	21	(United States) Alexander Orley	Alexander Orley	BMW	
Ret	22	(France) Eugène Martin	Eugène Martin	Jicey-BMW	
Ret	23	(Italy) Luigi Chinetti	Luigi Chinetti	Ferrari 166	
Ret	24	(France) "Robert"	Equipe Deho	Simca-Deho	
Ret	26	(France) Charles de Cortanze	Emil Darl'mat	Darl'mat-Peugeot	
Ret	34	(France) Maurice Monnier	Maurice Monnier	Bristol-Citroen	
DNS	30	(France) Jean Judet	Jean Judet	Maserati 4CL	

Grand Prix Race
Previous race: 1948 British Grand Prix	1948 Grand Prix season Grandes Épreuves	Next race: 1948 Monza Grand Prix
Previous race: 1947 Salon Grand Prix	Salon Grand Prix	Next race: 1949 Salon Grand Prix
