= 1947 Ulster Trophy =

Race details
- Date: 9 August 1947
- Official name: II Ulster Trophy
- Location: Ballyclare, Northern Ireland
- Course: Temporary road circuit
- Course length: 6.664 kilometres (4.141 miles)
- Distance: 36 laps, 239.918 kilometres (149.078 miles)

Pole position
| Driver | (United Kingdom) Bob Gerard | ERA |
- Time: 3:11

Fastest lap
| Driver | (United Kingdom) Bob Gerard | ERA |
- Time: 3:14

Podium
| First | (United Kingdom) Bob Gerard | ERA |
| Second | (United Kingdom) Barray Woodall | Delage |
| Third | (United Kingdom) George Abecassis | ERA |

The 2nd Ulster Trophy was a Formula One motor race held on 9 August 1947 at the Ballyclare circuit in Northern Ireland. The 36 lap race was won from pole position by Bob Gerard in an ERA B-Type, setting fastest lap in the process. Barry Woodall finished second in a Delage 15S8, and George Abecassis was third in an ERA A-Type.

== Results ==
| Pos | No. | Driver | Entrant | Constructor | Time/Retired | Grid |
|---|---|---|---|---|---|---|
| 1 | 3 | (United Kingdom) Bob Gerard | F.R. Gerard | ERA B-Type | 2:05:10, 115.03 kph | 1 |
| 2 | 6 | (United Kingdom) Barry Woodall | Barry Woodall | Delage 15S8 | +2 laps | 8 |
| 3 | 8 | (United Kingdom) George Abecassis | George Abecassis | ERA A-Type | +15 laps | 3 |
| 4 | 4 | (United Kingdom) Cuth Harrison | Cuth Harrison | ERA B-Type | +18 laps | 6 |
| Ret | 14 | (United Kingdom) Gordon Watson | Gordon Watson | Alta | 14 laps, accident | 7 |
| Ret | 2 | (United Kingdom) Reg Parnell | Reg Parnell | ERA E-Type | 11 laps, rear axle | 4 |
| Ret | 1 | (Thailand) B. Bira | Ecurie Souris Blanche | ERA B-Type | 5 laps, bearing | 2 |
| Ret | 12 | (United Kingdom) John Bolster | P.H.C. Bell | ERA B-Type | 4 laps, pinion | 5 |
| DNS | 15 | (United Kingdom) Raymond Mays | Raymond Mays | ERA B-Type | | |

| Previous race: 1947 Alsace Grand Prix | Formula One non-championship races 1947 season | Next race: 1947 Comminges Grand Prix |
| Previous race: 1946 Ulster Trophy | Ulster Trophy | Next race: 1950 Ulster Trophy |
