= 1947 Grand Prix season =

Second post-war year for Grand Prix racing

Seasons
- ← 1946 1948 →

The 1947 Grand Prix season was the second post-war year for Grand Prix racing. It constituted the first full season of the FIA's Formula One motor racing, though some Grands Prix still used other formulas. There was no organised championship in 1947, although several of the more prestigious races were recognised as Grandes Épreuves (great trials) by the FIA. Luigi Villoresi proved to be the most successful driver, winning six Grands Prix. Alfa Romeo's cars proved difficult to beat, winning 13 of the season's 32 Grands Prix.

== Season review ==
=== Grandes Épreuves ===
Date	Name	Circuit	Pole position	Fastest lap	Winning driver	Winning constructor	Report
8 June	(Switzerland) Swiss Grand Prix	Bremgarten	(France) Jean-Pierre Wimille	(France) Jean-Pierre Wimille	(France) Jean-Pierre Wimille	Alfa Romeo	Report
29 June	(Belgium) Belgian Grand Prix	Spa-Francorchamps	(France) Jean-Pierre Wimille	(France) Jean-Pierre Wimille	(France) Jean-Pierre Wimille	Alfa Romeo	Report
7 September	(Italy) Italian Grand Prix	Fiera Campionaria	(Italy) Consalvo Sanesi	(Italy) Carlo Felice Trossi	(Italy) Carlo Felice Trossi	Alfa Romeo	Report
21 September	(France) French Grand Prix	Lyon-Parilly	(France) Henri Louveau	(Italy) Alberto Ascari (Italy) Luigi Villoresi (France) Raph	(Monaco) Louis Chiron	Talbot-Lago-Talbot	Report

=== Other Grands Prix ===
Date	Name	Circuit	Winning driver	Winning constructor	Report
5 January	(Brazil) São Paulo Grand Prix	Interlagos	(Brazil) Chico Landi	Alfa Romeo	Report
9 February	(Argentina) I Buenos Aires Grand Prix	Retiro	(Italy) Luigi Villoresi	Maserati	Report
16 February	(Argentina) II Buenos Aires Grand Prix	Retiro	(Italy) Luigi Villoresi	Maserati	Report
2 March	(Argentina) Rosario Grand Prix	Independence Park	(Italy) Achille Varzi	Alfa Romeo	Report
9 March	(Egypt) Gezira Grand Prix	Gezira streets	(Italy) Franco Cortese	Cisitalia	Report
20 March	(Argentina) Rafaela Grand Prix	Rafaela	(Argentina) Oscar Alfredo Gálvez	Alfa Romeo	Report
30 March	(Brazil) Interlagos Grand Prix	Interlagos	(Italy) Achille Varzi	Alfa Romeo	Report
7 April	(France) Pau Grand Prix	Pau	(Italy) Nello Pagani	Maserati	Report
21 April	(Brazil) Rio de Janeiro Grand Prix	Gávea	(Brazil) Chico Landi	Alfa Romeo	Report
27 April	(France) Roussillon Grand Prix	Perpignan	(France) Eugène Chaboud	Talbot-Lago	Report
8 May	Jersey Road Race	Saint Helier	(United Kingdom) Reg Parnell	Maserati	Report
18 May	(France) Marseille Grand Prix	Prado	(France) Eugène Chaboud	Talbot-Lago	Report
25 May	(Belgium) Grand Prix des Frontières	Chimay	(Thailand) Prince Bira	Maserati	Report
1 June	(France) Nîmes Grand Prix	Nîmes	(Italy) Luigi Villoresi	Maserati	Report
8 June	(France) Challenges AGACI	Montlhéry	(France) Maurice Varet	Delage	Report
6 July	(France) I Grand Prix de Reims	Reims-Gueux	(Switzerland) Christian Kautz	Maserati	Report
12 July	(United Kingdom) Gransden Lodge	Gransden Lodge Airfield	(United Kingdom) Dennis Poore	Alfa Romeo	Report
13 July	(France) Albi Grand Prix	Albi	(France) Louis Rosier	Talbot-Lago	Report
13 July	(Italy) Bari Grand Prix	Lungomare	(Italy) Achille Varzi	Alfa Romeo	Report
13 July	(Argentina) Bell Ville Grand Prix	Bell Ville	(Argentina) Oscar Alfredo Gálvez	Alfa Romeo	Report
20 July	(France) Nice Grand Prix	Nice	(Italy) Luigi Villoresi	Maserati	Report
3 August	(France) Alsace Grand Prix	Strasbourg	(Italy) Luigi Villoresi	Maserati	Report
9 August	(United Kingdom) Ulster Trophy	Ballyclare	(United Kingdom) Bob Gerard	ERA	Report
10 August	(France) XIII Grand Prix du Comminges	Saint-Gaudens	(Monaco) Louis Chiron	Talbot-Lago	Report
17 August	(Uruguay) Montevideo Grand Prix	Playa Ramirez	(Argentina) Oscar Alfredo Gálvez	Alfa Romeo	Report
21 August	(United Kingdom) British Empire Trophy	Douglas Circuit	(United Kingdom) Bob Gerard	ERA	Report
21 September	(Argentina) Mar del Plata Grand Prix	El Torreon	(Argentina) Oscar Alfredo Gálvez	Alfa Romeo	Report
5 October	(Switzerland) Lausanne Grand Prix	Lausanne	(Italy) Luigi Villoresi	Maserati	Report
16 November	(France) III Grand Prix du Salon	Montlhéry	(France) Yves Giraud-Cabantous	Talbot-Lago	Report

== Statistics ==
=== Grand Prix winners ===
==== Drivers ====
Driver	Wins	
Driver	Total	Grandes Épreuves
(Italy) Luigi Villoresi	6	0
(Argentina) Oscar Alfredo Gálvez	4	0
(Italy) Achille Varzi	3	0
(France) Eugène Chaboud	2	0
(Monaco) Louis Chiron	2	1
(United Kingdom) Bob Gerard	2	0
(Brazil) Chico Landi	2	0
(France) Jean-Pierre Wimille	2	2
(Thailand) Prince Bira	1	0
(France) Yves Giraud-Cabantous	1	0
(Switzerland) Christian Kautz	1	0
(Italy) Nello Pagani	1	0
(United Kingdom) Reg Parnell	1	0
(United Kingdom) Dennis Poore	1	0
(France) Louis Rosier	1	0
(Italy) Carlo Felice Trossi	1	1
(Italy) Franco Cortese	1	0
(France) Maurice Varet	1	0

==== Manufacturers ====
Manufacturer	Wins	
Manufacturer	Total	Grandes Épreuves
(Italy) Alfa Romeo	13	3
(Italy) Maserati	10	0
(France) Talbot-Lago-Talbot	6	1
(United Kingdom) ERA	2	0
(France) Delage	1	0
