= Jean Achard =

Jean Achard may refer to:

- Jean Achard (painter) (1807–1884), French painter.
- Jean Achard (racing driver) (1918–1951), French race-car driver, journalist, and member of the French Resistance.
