= Roussillon Grand Prix =

- Circuit des Platanes de Perpignan
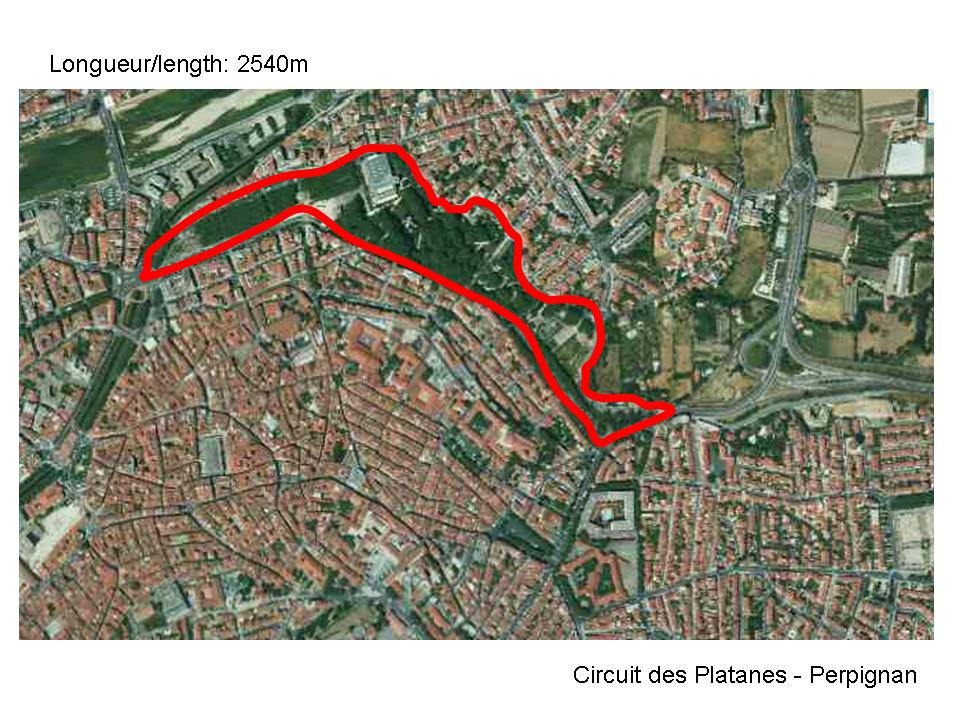

Race information
- Number of times held: 4
- First held: 1946
- Last held: 1949
- Most wins (drivers): no repeat winners
- Most wins (constructors): no repeat winners
- Circuit length: 2.538 km (1.577 miles)
- Race length: 253.8 km (157.7 miles)
- Laps: 100

Last race (1949)

Pole position
- (Thailand) Prince Bira; Maserati; 1:27.9

Podium
- 1. (Argentina) J. M. Fangio; Squadra Argentina Maserati; 2:33:16.7; 2. (Thailand) Prince Bira; Maserati; +24.6s; 3. (Argentina) B. Campos; Squadra Argentina Maserati; +2 laps

Fastest lap
- (Thailand) Prince Bira; Maserati; 1:27.3

The Roussillon Grand Prix (Grand Prix du Roussillon) was a Grand Prix motor racing event that was held between 1946 and 1949 in the streets of Perpignan, France. The race used the 2.538 km (1.577 mi) Circuit des Patanes around the Square Bir Hakeim. In 1948, the grand prix was a part of the Formula 2 series. The Roussillon Grand Prix disappeared after four years, for safety reasons.

A motorbike race was also held in the circuit the same day between 1946 and 1952.

The 1–2 October 1994, an auto-moto historic Grand Prix was organised on the same street circuit. Maurice Trintignant, winner of the 1948 edition was present.

== Winners of the Grand Prix du Roussillon ==
Year	Class	Driver	Constructor	Report
1946	GPR	(France) Jean-Pierre Wimille	Alfa Romeo 308	Report
1947	GPR	(France) Eugène Chaboud	Talbot-Lago T26	Report
1948	F2	(France) Maurice Trintignant	Simca-Gordini T11/T1430	Report
1949	GPR	(Argentina) Juan Manuel Fangio	Maserati 4CLT-48	Report

- GPR: Grand Prix motor racing
- F2: Formula Two

== Motorcycle Grand Prix ==
Year	Class	Driver	Team
1946		?	
1947	175cc	Picout Jean	
1947	250cc	Goll	
1947	300cc	Fourquet	
1947	500cc	Lesur	
1948		?	
1949		?	
1950	not held ?		
1951	350cc	(United Kingdom) Tommy Wood	Velocette
1951	500cc	(Italy) Umberto Masetti	Gilera
1951	sidecar	(France) René Bétemps (France) Georges Burggraf	Triumph
1952	175cc	(France) Gaston Gaury	125 Morini
1952	350cc	(France) Georges Monneret	AJS
1952	500cc	(France) Jacques Collot	Norton
1952	sidecar	(France) Jean Murit (France) André Emo	Norton
