= 1947 Roussillon Grand Prix =

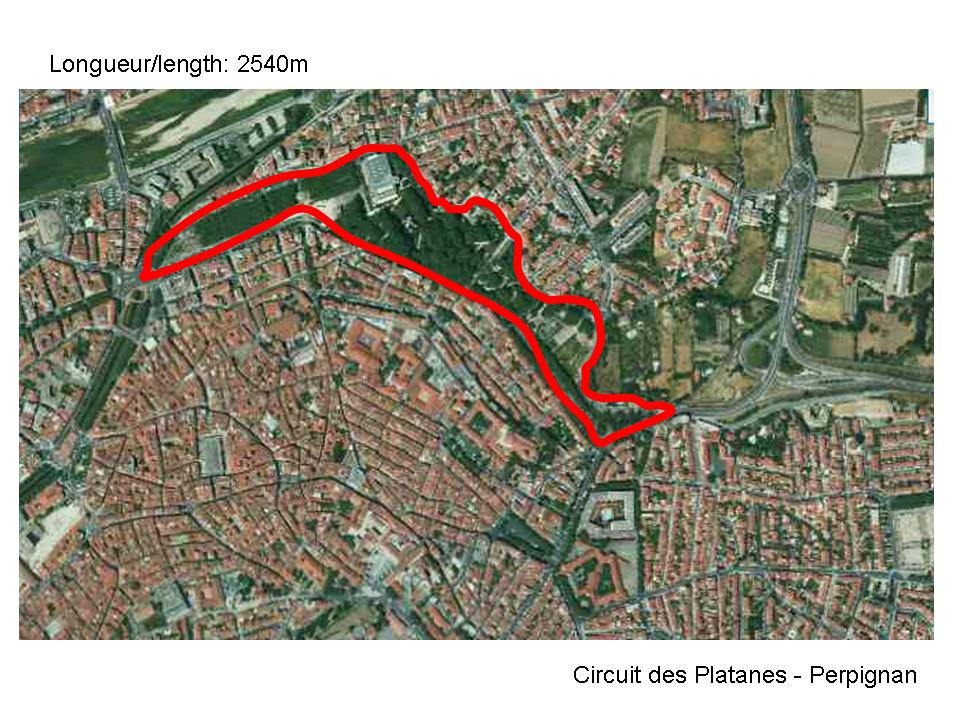

Race details
- Date: 27 April 1947
- Official name: II Grand Prix du Roussillon
- Location: Circuit des platanes de Perpignan; Perpignan, France
- Course: Street circuit
- Course length: 2.538 km (1.577 miles)
- Distance: 58 laps, 147.204 km (91.468 miles)

Pole position
Driver	(France) Raymond Sommer	Maserati 4CM
- Time: 1:34.8
- Grid positions set by heat results

Fastest lap
Driver	(France) Raymond Sommer	Maserati 4CM
- Time: 1:34.2

Podium
First	(France) Eugène Chaboud	Talbot-Lago 26
Second	(France) Henri Louveau	Delage D6
Third	(France) Yves Giraud-Cabantous	Delahaye 135

The 1947 Roussillon Grand Prix (formally the II Grand Prix du Roussillon) was a Grand Prix motor race held at Circuit des Platanes de Perpignan on 8 May 1947.

== Entry list ==
No	Driver	Entrant	Car	Engine	Chassis
2	(France) Eugène Chaboud	SFACS Ecurie France	Talbot-Lago T26	Talbot	90201
4	(France) Henri Trillaud	SFACS Ecurie France	Delahaye 135S	Delahaye	
6	(France) Yves Giraud-Cabantous	SFACS Ecurie France	Delahaye 135S	Delahaye	
8	(France) Raymond Sommer	Raymond Sommer	Maserati 4CM	Maserati 4CL	1555
10	(France) Philippe Étancelin	Ecurie Gersac	Delage 3000	Delage D6	
12	(France) Pierre Levegh	Ecurie Gersac	Delage 3000	Delage D6	
14	(France) Jean Achard	Ecurie Gersac	Delage 3000	Delage D6	880002
16	(France) Henri Louveau	SFACS Ecurie France	Delage 3000	Delage D6	880004
18	(France) Roger Loyer	SFACS Ecurie France	Delahaye 135S	Delahaye	
20	(France) Georges Grignard	Georges Grignard	Delahaye 135	Delahaye	
28	(France) Louis Rosier	SFACS Ecurie France	Talbot-Lago SS	Talbot	90111
30	(France) Jean-Pierre Wimille	Equipe Gordini	Simca-Gordini 15	Gordini	0007GC

== Classification ==
In the first few laps, Georges Grignard, Philippe Étancelin, Jean Achard and Roger Loyer were involved in a four car accident with no injured but the abandon of Achard on his Delage D6 at lap 7. At lap 21, Jean-Pierre Wimille, second behind Sommer had engine trouble and retired. After a pole position and with the fastest lap, Raymond Sommer was still leading the race, but 14 laps from the end he retired. Eugène Chaboud won the race on Talbot-Lago T26, ex-Chiron 4.5l monoposto Darracq. Henri Louveau finish second just ahead of Yves Giraud-Cabantous.

Pos	No	Driver	Car	Laps	Time/Retired	Grid
1	2	(France) Eugène Chaboud	Talbot-Lago T26	58	1:35:06.3 (92.81 km/h)	3
2	16	(France) Henri Louveau	Delage D6	57	+1 lap	4
3	6	(France) Yves Giraud-Cabantous	Delahaye 135	57	+1 lap	5
4	12	(France) Pierre Levegh	Delage D6	57	+1 lap	7
5	20	(France) Georges Grignard	Delahaye 135	55	+3 laps	8
6	28	(France) Louis Rosier	Talbot-Lago SS	55	+3 laps	10
7	4	(France) Henri Trillaud	Delahaye 135S	55	+3 laps	12
Ret	8	(France) Raymond Sommer	Maserati 4CM	44	gearbox	1
Ret	18	(France) Roger Loyer	Delahaye 135S	40	condenser	9
Ret	10	(France) Philippe Étancelin	Delage D6	33	engine	6
Ret	30	(France) Jean-Pierre Wimille	Simca-Gordini 15	21	overheating	2
Ret	14	(France) Jean Achard	Delage D6	7	accident	11

- Pole position: Raymond Sommer in 1:34.8
- Fastest lap: Raymond Sommer in 1:34.2 (96.94 km/h).

Grand Prix Race
1947 Grand Prix season
Previous race: 1946 Roussillon Grand Prix	Roussillon Grand Prix	Next race: 1948 Roussillon Grand Prix
