= Martin-Spéciale =

French car manufacturer

The Martin was a car developed in Paris by Eugène Martin. Only a handful were made.

Eugène Martin (1915–2006) is best remembered as a racing driver. However, he was also a senior and long standing engineer with the French carburettor manufacturer, Solex. He had an exceptional understanding of carburetion issues in particular and of engines in general, and was recognised by colleagues as a talented trouble shooter in technical matters. He was also the director, along with his father, of a Paris-based garage in the Avenue Ledru-Rolin and here, in the 1950s, he began to specialise in developing performance versions of the Peugeot 203: the 203 was hugely popular at the time and by 1950 had, despite its size, become France's second best selling car.

From improving the performance of customers' Peugeots it seemed a natural progression to develop his own car, and the (Peugeot 203 based) Martin-Spéciale was an elegant two-door coupé, designed by Martin, and presented at the Paris Motor Show in October 1952. The Peugeot suspension was reinforced and the Peugeot engine had its capacity increased from 1290 cc to approximately 1500 cc. The extensive use made of Peugeot parts promised a car that would retail at a competitive price.

However, Eugène Martin never got through the hurdles necessary to put his promising design into series production. Nevertheless, its appearance at the Motor Show attracted the attention of Jacques Bernard of Salmson, and Martin found himself invited to take charge of the technical development of Salmson's own contender in the coupé sector. The result was the Salmson 2300 Sport. In the end this would turn out to be the last car produced by Salmson, but it nevertheless enjoyed commercial success ahead of anything achieved by the Martin-Spéciale, and also competed, from 1955, over three successive years in the Le Mans 24 Hour Race.
