= Ecurie Lutetia =

French racing team

- Base: France
- Founder(s): (France) Eugène Chaboud (France) Charles Pozzi

Formula One World Championship career
- First entry: 1950 Belgian Grand Prix
- Races entered: 2
- Constructors: Talbot-Lago
- Engines: Talbot
- Drivers' Championships: 0
- Race victories: 0
- Pole positions: 0
- Fastest laps: 0
- Final entry: 1950 French Grand Prix

Ecurie Lutetia was a French racing team founded by racing drivers Eugène Chaboud and Charles Pozzi. The team's name was derived from Lutetia, a town that stood where Paris is now located, and the fact that Pozzi was born in Paris. Ecurie Lutetia entered two Formula One World Championship Grands Prix, but scored no points. (Note: Eugène Chaboud originally entered the 1950 French Grand Prix under the name of Ecurie Lutetia, but did not start the race, and instead co-drove with Philippe Étancelin.) They also participated in non-championship Formula One, Formula Two and Le Mans races between 1948 and 1950. However, Chaboud and Pozzi entered races under their own names more often than under Ecurie Lutetia.

== Racing record ==
In 1948 and 1949, Ecurie Lutetia entered 12 Grands Prix in France and Italy. Their drivers were Eugène Chaboud, Charles Pozzi, and Pierre Meyrat. Their best result were a 3rd and 4th place in the 1949 Salon Grand Prix.

The team's first Formula One entry was at the 1950 Belgian Grand Prix. Eugène Chaboud drove a Talbot-Lago T26C-DA. He qualified 11th, but retired from the race with a damaged oil pipe after 22 of 35 laps.

Less than a week later, the team competed in the 24 Hours of Le Mans. They entered two cars, both specially modified "S" variants of the Delahaye 175. Charles Pozzi and Pierre Flahaut were behind the wheel of the first car, Gaston Serraud and André Guelfi were driving the second. Unfortunately, Serraud and Guelfi were unable to start the race due to a faulty battery, and Pozzi and Flahaut were disqualified in the 15th hour of the race. They were also troubled by a water leak, but the reason for disqualification is unclear.

Another week later, the first weekend of July 1950, Ecurie Lutetia entered the 1950 French Grand Prix. Again, the driver was Eugène Chaboud, but unlike the previous Grand Prix, he drove a Talbot-Lago T26C model, not the twin-plug "DA" variant used by the Talbot works team. Chaboud qualified 10th, but did not start the race under his original entry. Instead, he shared the car of Philippe Étancelin and together they finished 5th, scoring one World Championship point.

== Complete Formula One results ==
(key) (results in bold indicate pole position; results in italics indicate fastest lap)

Year	Chassis	Engine	Tyres	Driver	GBR	MON	500	SUI	BEL	FRA	ITA
1950	Talbot-Lago T26C-DA	Talbot 23CV 4.5 L6	**D**	(France) Eugène Chaboud					Ret	DNS	
