= 1947 Lausanne Grand Prix =

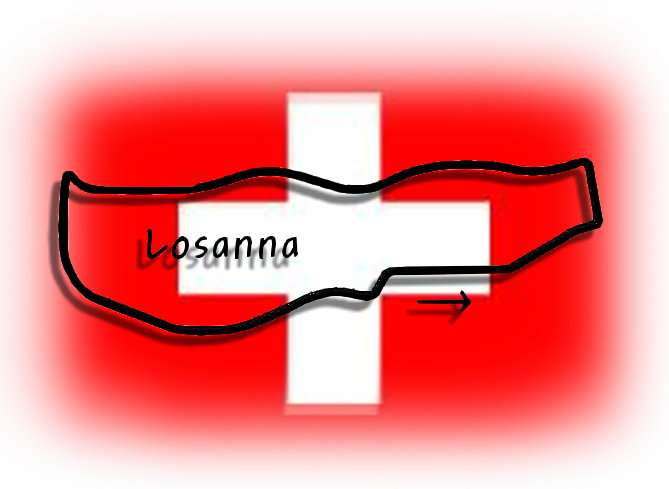

Race details
- Date: 5 October 1947
- Official name: Lausanne Grand Prix
- Location: Lausanne
- Course: Temporary street circuit
- Course length: 3.251 km (2.020 mi)
- Distance: 90 laps, 292.59 km (181.81 mi)

Pole position
Driver	(Italy) Alberto Ascari	Maserati
- Time: not available

Fastest lap
Driver	(Italy) Alberto Ascari	Maserati
- Time: 1:465.

Podium
First	(Italy) Luigi Villoresi	Maserati
Second	(France) Jean-Pierre Wimille	Gordini
Third	(Switzerland) Emmanuel de Graffenried	Maserati

The 1947 Lausanne Grand Prix was a non-championship Formula One motor race held in Lausanne on 5 October 1947. The race was held over 90 laps and was won by Luigi Villoresi in a Maserati 4CL. Jean-Pierre Wimille in a Simca Gordini Type 15 was second and Emmanuel de Graffenried in another Maserati 4CL was third. Alberto Ascari started from pole position in his Maserati 4CL and set fastest lap but retired with brake failure.

== Classification ==
Pos	No	Driver	Entrant	Manufacturer	Time/Retired	Grid
1	4	(Italy) Luigi Villoresi	Scuderia Ambrosiana	Maserati 4CL	2:49:30.4, 103.57kph	5
2	14	(France) Jean-Pierre Wimille	Equipe Gordini	Simca Gordini Type 15	+1:03.7	6
3	28	(Switzerland) Emmanuel de Graffenried	Enrico Platé	Maserati 4CL	+4 laps	10
4	10	(Monaco) Louis Chiron	Ecurie France	Talbot-Lago T26	+4 laps	4
5	12	(France) Yves Giraud-Cabantous	Ecurie France	Talbot-Lago T150	+4 laps	12
6	20	(United Kingdom) Peter Whitehead	Peter Whitehead	ERA B-Type	+7 laps	11
7	22	(United Kingdom) John Heath	George Abecassis	ERA A-Type	+18 laps	14
Ret	2	(France) Raymond Sommer	Raymond Sommer	Maserati 4CL	80 laps, gearbox	2
Ret	26	(Italy) Piero Taruffi	Enrico Platé	Maserati 4CL	68 laps, mechanical	3
Ret	32	(Switzerland) Max Christen	Max Christen	Maserati 4CL	56 laps, mechanical	16
Ret.	36	(United Kingdom) Reg Parnell	Scuderia Milano	Maserati 4CL	42 laps, brakes	13
Ret.	24	(United Kingdom) David Hampshire	Reg Parnell	ERA E-Type	38 laps, clutch	7
Ret.	6	(Italy) Alberto Ascari	Scuderia Ambrosiana	Maserati 4CL	28 laps, brake pipe	1
Ret.	8	(Thailand) B. Bira	Ecurie Souris Blanche	Maserati 4CL	18 laps, engine	8
Ret.	30	(Switzerland) Ernst Hürzeler	Ernst Hürzeler	Maserati 4CL	6 laps, engine	15
Ret.	16	(France) "Raph"	Ecurie Naphtra Course	Maserati 4CL	2 laps	9

Grand Prix Race
1947 Grand Prix season
Previous race: —	Lausanne Grand Prix	Next race: 1949 Lausanne Grand Prix
