= 1948 Monza Grand Prix =

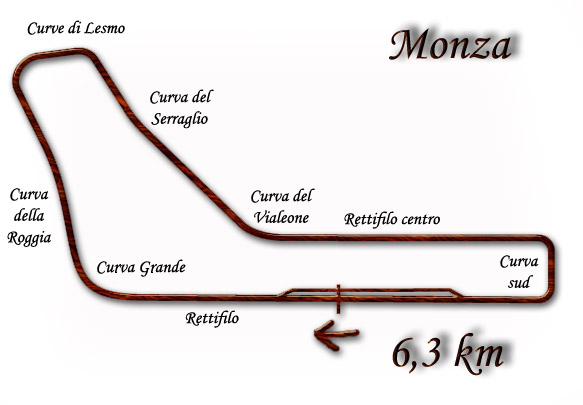

Race details
- Date: 17 October 1948
- Official name: I Gran Premio dell'Autodromo di Monza
- Location: Autodromo Nazionale di Monza, Monza, Italy
- Course: Permanent racing facility
- Course length: 6.300 km (3.915 mi)
- Distance: 80 laps, 503.98 km (313.16 mi)

Pole position
| Driver | (France) Jean-Pierre Wimille | Alfa Romeo |
- Time: 1:59.6

Fastest lap
| Driver | (Italy) Consalvo Sanesi | Alfa Romeo |
- Time: 2:00.4

Podium
| First | (France) Jean-Pierre Wimille | Alfa Romeo |
| Second | (Italy) Carlo Felice Trossi | Alfa Romeo |
| Third | (Italy) Consalvo Sanesi | Alfa Romeo |

The I Gran Premio dell'Autodromo di Monza was a motor race for Formula One cars held at Monza on 17 October 1948. Alfa Romeo dominated the event, the latest development of the 158 taking the first three places with Jean-Pierre Wimille winning from pole position. Carlo Felice Trossi and Consalvo Sanesi were second and third, Sanesi having set fastest lap. Piero Taruffi completed the rout in one of the older 158s.

== Result ==
| Pos | No | Driver | Entrant | Constructor | Time/Retired | Grid |
|---|---|---|---|---|---|---|
| 1 | 32 | (France) Jean-Pierre Wimille | Alfa Corse | Alfa Romeo 158/47 | 2:50:44.4, 177.10kph | 1 |
| 2 | 18 | (Italy) Carlo Felice Trossi | Alfa Corse | Alfa Romeo 158/47 | +42.6s | 3 |
| 3 | 36 | (Italy) Consalvo Sanesi | Alfa Corse | Alfa Romeo 158/47 | +1:40.0 | 4 |
| 4 | 6 | (Italy) Piero Taruffi | Alfa Corse | Alfa Romeo 158 | +2 laps | 2 |
| 5 | 16 | (Italy) Alberto Ascari | Scuderia Ambrosiana | Maserati 4CLT/48 | +5 Laps | 8 |
| 6 | 4 | (France) Eugène Chaboud | Ecurie France | Talbot-Lago T26C | +8 Laps | 10 |
| 7 | 60 | (Argentina) Clemar Bucci | Scuderia Milano | Maserati 4CL | +11 Laps | 9 |
| 8 | 56 | (United Kingdom) Cuth Harrison | Cuth Harrison | ERA B-Type | +13 Laps | 15 |
| 9 | 26 | (United Kingdom) Fred Ashmore | Fred Ashmore | Maserati 4CLT/48 | +13 Laps | 17 |
| 10 | 40 | (Italy) Nello Pagani | Scuderia Milano | Maserati 4CL | +17 laps | 18 |
| Ret | 48 | (Italy) Gianfranco Comotti | Gianfranco Comotti | Talbot-Lago T26C | 65 laps | 20 |
| Ret | 12 | (Italy) Giuseppe Farina | Scuderia Ferrari | Ferrari 125 | 53 laps, transmission | 6 |
| Ret | 46 | (Italy) Luigi Villoresi | Scuderia Ambrosiana | Maserati 4CLT/48 | 48 laps, transmission | 7 |
| Ret | 10 | (Monaco) Louis Chiron | Ecurie France | Talbot-Lago T26C | 46 laps | 13 |
| Ret | 30 | (France) Pierre Levegh | Pierre Levegh | Talbot-Lago T26C | 35 laps | 12 |
| Ret | 22 | (Switzerland) Emmanuel de Graffenried | Enrico Plate | Maserati 4CL | 20 laps | 19 |
| Ret | 52 | (France) Yves Giraud-Cabantous | Ecurie France | Talbot-Lago T26C | 17 laps | 14 |
| Ret | 58 | (United Kingdom) Reg Parnell | Reg Parnell | Maserati 4CLT/48 | 17 laps, engine | 16 |
| Ret | 34 | (United Kingdom) Leslie Brooke | Leslie Brooke | Maserati 4CLT/48 | 16 laps, engine | 11 |
| Ret | 14 | (France) Raymond Sommer | Scuderia Ferrari | Ferrari 125 | 7 laps, driver ill | 5 |
| DNQ | 8 | (Italy) Clemente Biondetti | Clemente Biondetti | Talbot-Darracq 700 | | |
| DNQ | 20 | (Italy) Dorino Serafini | Scuderia Milano | Maserati 4CL | | |
| DNQ | 50 | (Italy) Carlo Minozzi | Carlo Minozzi | Maserati 4CL | | |
| DNQ | 54 | (Italy) Fulvio Tenaglia | Fulvio Tenaglia | Maserati 4CL | | |

Grand Prix Race
| Previous race: 1948 Salon Grand Prix | 1948 Grand Prix season Grandes Épreuves | Next race: 1948 Garda Grand Prix |
| Previous race: — | Monza Grand Prix | Next race: 1949 Monza Grand Prix |
