= Alessandro Gaboardi =

Italian mechanic and Grand Prix driver (1906 – ?)

- Born: Alessandro Gaboardi; 10 May 1906 Mantua, Italy
- Died: unknown

Alessandro Gaboardi (10 May 1906 – ?) was an Italian mechanic, who took part in the 1947 Italian Grand Prix.

== Career ==
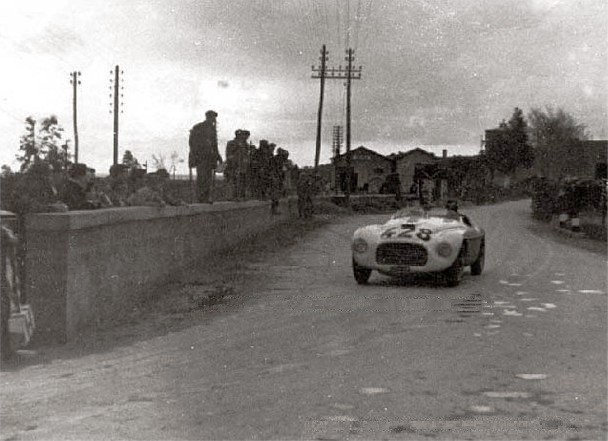
With Luciano Musso at the 1950 Targa Florio

Gaboardi was a mechanic at Alfa Romeo from the 1930s onwards, in 1932 accompanying Tim Birkin from Portello to Ireland in Birkin's new Alfa Romeo 8C 2000 for Birkin to take part in the Irish Grand Prix; Gaboardi remained in Ireland to sit as Birkin's riding mechanic, and the duo took the Eirann Cup for winning the second heat of the Grand Prix. He also shared 15th in the 1935 Mille Miglia, as mechanic to "Frate Ignoto".

After the Second World War, Gaboardi was appointed chief mechanic on the Alfa Romeo 158s, and undertook extensive testing on the cars; this meant that, when the unions at Alfa demanded that one of their members be given a Grand Prix drive, Gaboardi was called up to drive at the 1947 Italian Grand Prix, and Gaboardi drove conservatively and carefully to register a 4th place in an Alfettaa clean sweep of the top four places. It was his only single seater drive of importance, the "working class" complement otherwise generally being long-standing test driver Consalvo Sanesi, who had been four laps ahead of Gaboardi in the Grand Prix.

Gaboardi's only other prominent result was finishing 9th in the 1950 Targa Florio. By this time he had switched to Ferrari, and was sharing a Ferrari 166S with Luciano Musso. His last recorded event was the 1956 Mille Miglia, sharing a Vignale-bodied Ferrari 166MM with Giampaolo Vailetti, but the pair retired before Bologna, having been 159th overall at Florence.

== Sports car results ==
- Racing Sports Cars
