= Simca-Gordini T15 =

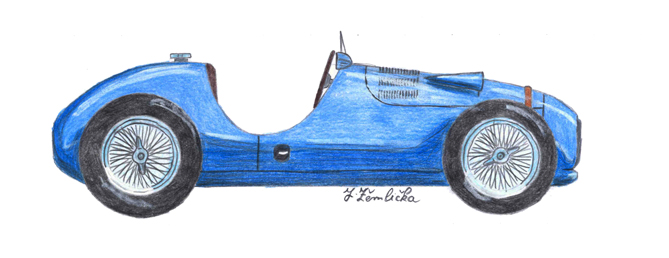
- Category: Formula One
- Constructor: Gordini

Technical specifications
- Chassis: Steel tubular spaceframe, aluminum body
- Suspension (front): Double wishbones, independent with torsion bar springs, Messier shock absorbers, anti-roll bar
- Suspension (rear): Rear rigid live axle, Watts linkage, Messier hydraulic shock absorbers, trailing arms, anti-roll bar
- Axle track: 1,140 mm (45 in) (front); 1,160 mm (46 in) (rear)
- Wheelbase: 2,240 mm (88 in)
- Engine: 1.4–1.5 L (85.4–91.5 cu in) Gordini DOHC L4 naturally-aspirated mid-engined
- Transmission: 4-speed manual
- Power: 94 hp (70 kW) at 6000 rpm (Monoposoto version); 195 hp (145 kW) at 6500 rpm (Formula One version)
- Weight: 680 kg (1,499 lb)
- Brakes: Disc brakes

Competition history
- Debut: 1948 Stockholm Grand Prix

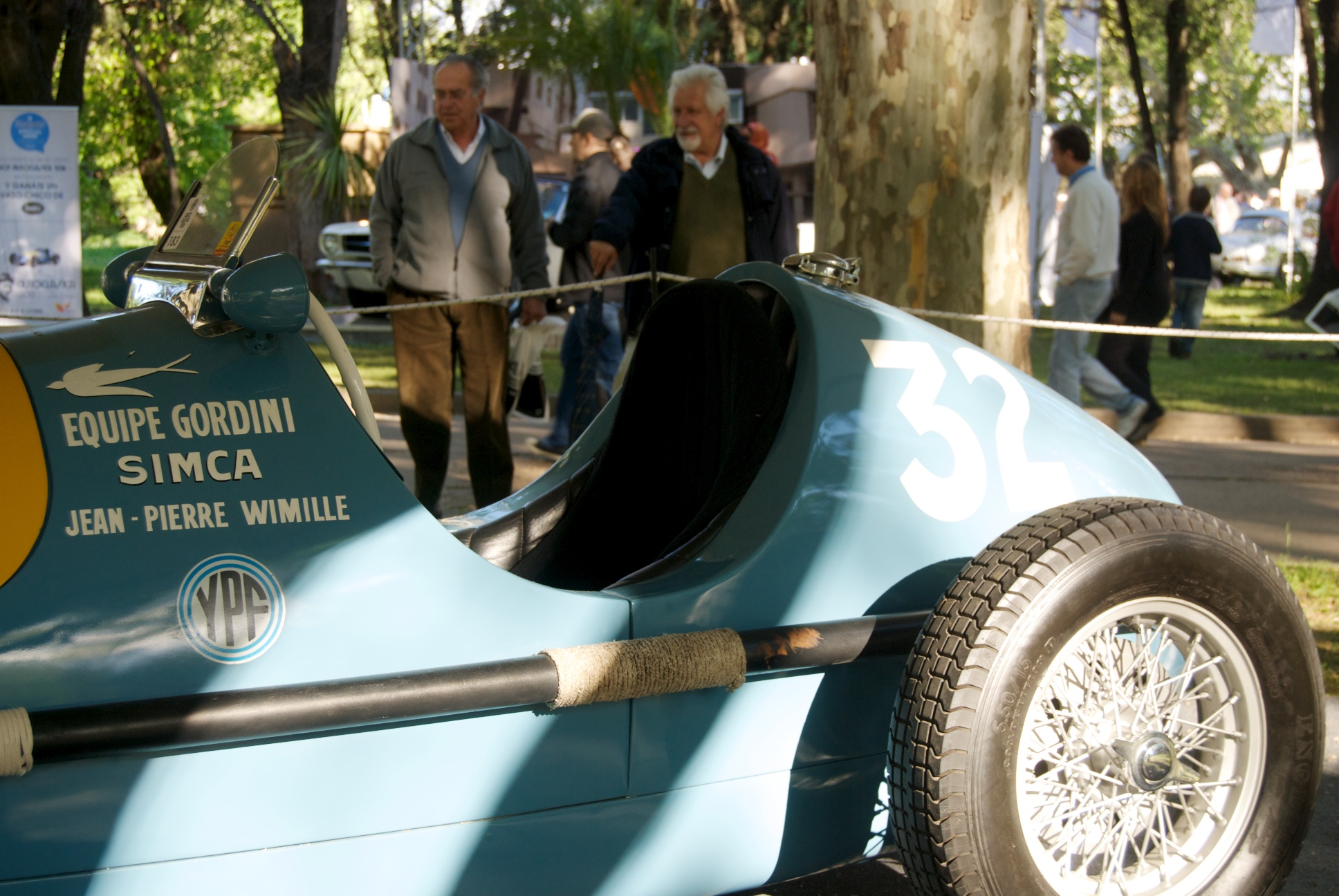
Simca-Gordini T15

The Simca-Gordini Type 15, also known as the Gordini Type 15, is an open-wheel race car designed, developed, and built by French manufacturer Gordini, to compete in Formula One, and was produced between 1947 and 1953.
