= Jean Achard (racing driver) =

French race-car driver

- Born: Jean-Jacques Grosman; 15 March 1918; Paris, France
- Died: 14 July 1951 (aged 33); Brazil
- Cause of death: Killed in a hill climb event.
- Occupation(s): Journalist and an active member of the French Resistance during World War II

Jean-Jacques Grosman, known as Jean Achard (15 March 1918 – 14 July 1951), was a French race-car driver and journalist and a member of the French Resistance during World War II.

== Biography ==
Achard was born in Paris on 14 July 1918. When the Nazis invaded France, Achard, like many Frenchmen, took up arms for the French Resistance, eventually becoming editor-in-chief of one of the many resistance newspapers, "Debout" (French for "On Our Feet"), which was founded by Claude Julien, another member of the French Resistance. Achard eventually became the Chairman of the Fédération nationale française des anciens combattants("French National Federation of Former Combatants"). He made his racing debut in a supercharged Maserati 1500.

Achard was successful in the 1946 and 1947 racing seasons, but in June 1947 he crashed on the first lap, while the V12 Delahaye 155 that he had used in 1946 was lent to Levegh for the race. Achard drove the Delahaye again on 13 July 1947. That same day, he had crashed at the Grand Prix de l’Albigeois at Albi, when one of the wheels from his Delahaye flew into the grandstands, killing a female spectator. He did not race again until 1951. In 1950, Achard decided to make a comeback. He brought Philippe Étancelin's Talbot-Lago T26C and he emigrated to Rio de Janeiro in Brazil.

That year he raced at Interlagos on 13 May, finishing 5th, and at Boavista on 24 June, finishing 3rd. Achard was even accepted into the 1951 running of the Indy 500, but he never made it to the race: he was killed in a hill climb event in Brazil.
