= Roger Loyer =

French motorcycle racer and racing driver (1907–1988)

- Born: 5 August 1907; Paris, France
- Died: 24 March 1988 (aged 80); Paris, France

Formula One World Championship career
- Nationality: (France) French
- Active years: 1954
- Team: Gordini
- Entries: 1
- Championships: 0
- Wins: 0
- Podiums: 0
- Career points: 0
- Pole positions: 0
- Fastest laps: 0
- First entry: 1954 Argentine Grand Prix

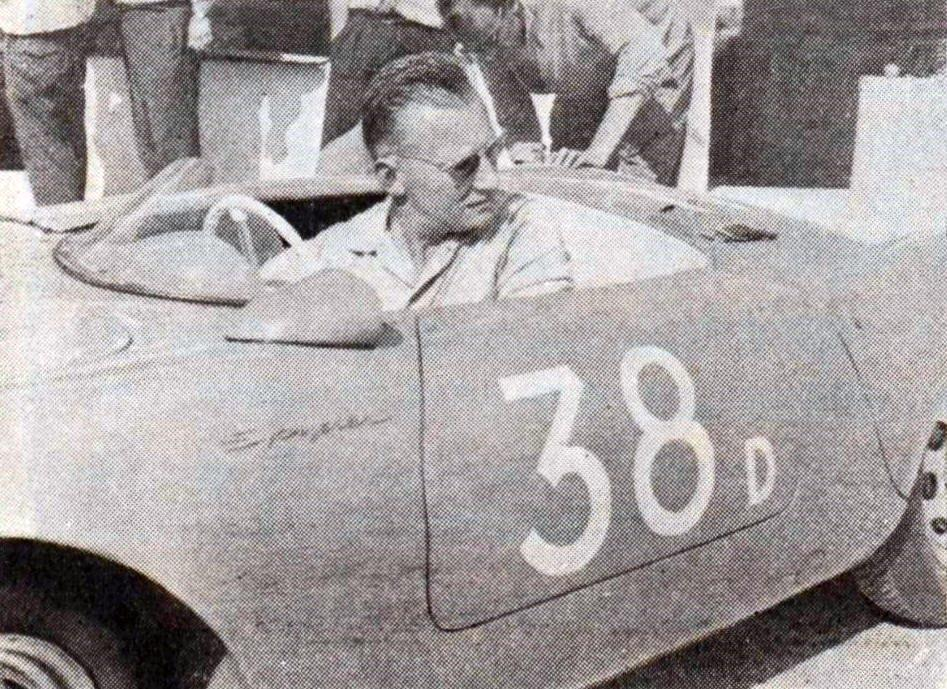
Roger Loyer in a Porsche 550, 1956

Roger Auguste Loyer (5 August 1907 – 24 March 1988) was a motorcycle road racer and racing driver from France. He won the 1937 250cc French motorcycle Grand Prix and the 1938 350cc French motorcycle Grand Prix.

Loyer participated in one Formula One World Championship Grand Prix, the Argentine Grand Prix on 17 January 1954. His Gordini Type 16 ran out of oil, and he scored no championship points. Shortly after, this car failed again during the non-Championship Buenos Aires Grand Prix, but Loyer was able to share Élie Bayol's car to finish tenth.

== Complete Formula One World Championship results ==
(key)

Year	Entrant	Chassis	Engine	1	2	3	4	5	6	7	8	9	WDC	Points
1954	Equipe Gordini	Gordini Type 16	Gordini Straight-6	ARG; Ret	500	BEL	FRA	GBR	GER	SUI	ITA	ESP	NC	0
