= Eugène Martin =

French racing driver (1915–2006)

- Born: 24 March 1915; Suresnes, Hauts-de-Seine, France
- Died: 12 October 2006 (aged 91); Aytré, Charente Maritime, France

Formula One World Championship career
- Nationality: (France) French
- Active years: 1950
- Team: Talbot-Lago
- Entries: 2
- Championships: 0
- Wins: 0
- Podiums: 0
- Career points: 0
- Pole positions: 0
- Fastest laps: 0
- First entry: 1950 British Grand Prix
- Last entry: 1950 Swiss Grand Prix

Eugène Martin (24 March 1915 – 12 October 2006) was a racing driver from France. He participated in two Formula One World Championship Grands Prix, debuting on 13 May 1950. He scored no championship points.

Martin is better known for his participation in several of the prewar grands prix. He won the first Grand Prix Aix les Bains Circuit du Lac in 1949 with a Jicey-BMW developed by Jean Caillas.

In the 1950s, Martin embarked on a brief career as an auto-maker, working at the Paris-based garage he owned with his father to produce the Martin-Spéciale. The car was exhibited at the 1952 Paris Motor Show but never progressed to series production.

Martin was one of the last surviving drivers from that era until his death at a hospital near his home in La Rochelle in 2006.

== Complete Formula One World Championship results ==
(key)

Year	Entrant	Chassis	Engine	1	2	3	4	5	6	7	WDC	Points
1950	Automobiles Talbot-Darracq	Talbot-Lago T26C-DA	Talbot Straight-6	GBR; Ret	MON	500	SUI; Ret	BEL	FRA	ITA	NC	0
