= Charles Pozzi =

French racing driver (1909–2001)

- Born: Carlo Alberto Pozzi; 27 August 1909; Paris, France
- Died: 28 February 2001 (aged 91)

Formula One World Championship career
- Nationality: (France) French
- Active years: 1950
- Team: privateer Talbot-Lago
- Entries: 1
- Championships: 0
- Wins: 0
- Podiums: 0
- Career points: 0
- Pole positions: 0
- Fastest laps: 0
- First entry: 1950 French Grand Prix

Charles Albert Pozzi (born Carlo Alberto Pozzi; 27 August 1909 – 28 February 2001) was a French racing driver who participated in one World Championship Formula One race in 1950, the year of its inception.

== Racing career ==
Born Carlo Alberto Pozzi in Paris, France of Italian parentage, he became known as Charles, the French translation of his name. He was working as an automobile broker and his career as a racing driver only began when he was already 37 years old. Later in life, as the official French importer of Ferrari and Maserati automobiles, his name was to appear on many racing cars.

In 1946, he competed, with his Delahaye 135CS, in several races including the Grand Prix of Bourgogne – Dijon where he finished in fourth position and the Le Mans Grand Prix, raced on the Nantes race track this year, where he finished in fifth position, driving a Delahaye.

In 1949, he won the Comminges sports car Grand Prix, in Saint-Gaudens, with a Delahaye 145 (chassis N° 48775), equipped with a 4.5-litre six-cylinder Delahaye 175 engine.

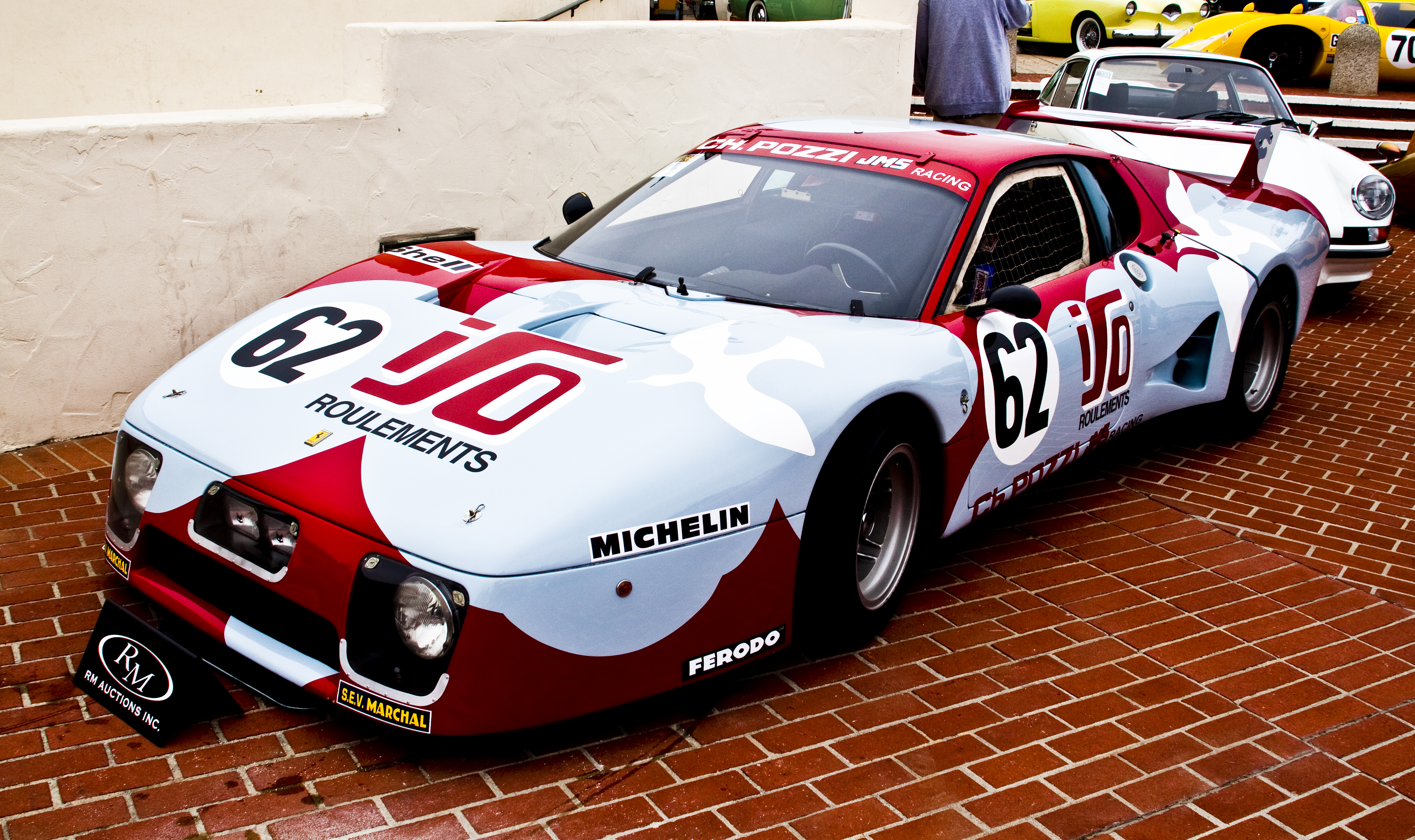
Ferrari Berlinetta Boxer, entered into competition by Charles Pozzi's team

== Major achievements ==
Category	Date	Race	Team	Car	Position
Pre War	apr.-46	5th Grand Prix de Nice	Ecurie France	Delahaye 135S	8
Pre War	may-46	1st Grand Prix du Forez	Ecurie France	Delahaye 135CS	7
Pre War	June-46	1st Coupe René le Bègue	Ecurie France	Delahaye 135CS	11
Pre War	July-46	2nd Grand Prix de Bourgogne – Dijon	Ecurie France	Delahaye 135CS	4
Pre War	July-46	1st Prix des 24 heures du Mans – Nantes	Ecurie France	Delahaye 135CS	5
Pre War	aug.-46	1st Circuit des Trois Villes – Roubaix	Ecurie France	Delahaye 135CS	7
Pre War	febr.-47	Stockholm Grand Prix	Ecurie France	Delahaye 135CS	5
Pre War	June-47	3rd Grand Prix de Nîmes	Ecurie France	Delahaye 135CS	5
Pre War	July-47	16th Grand Prix de la Marne – Reims	Ecurie France	Delahaye 135CS	7
Formula 2	July-47	9th Grand Prix d´Albi	Private	Delahaye 135CS	3
Pre War	July-47	1st Grand Prix de la Ville de Nice	Private	Delahaye 135CS	5
Pre War	aug.-47	2nd Grand Prix d´Alsace	Private	Talbot-Lago T150C Spéciale	5
Pre War	sept.-47	18th Gran Premio d´Italia	Private	Delahaye 135CS	7
Pre War	sept.-47	34th Grand Prix de l´ACF	Private	Delahaye 135CS	5
Pre War	nov.-47	4th Coupe du Salon	Private	Delahaye 135CS	3
Pre War	mar.-48	8th Grand Prix Automobile de Pau	Private	Talbot-Lago T150C	4
Pre War	may-48	2nd Grand Prix de Paris	Ecurie Lutetia	Delahaye 135S	11
Pre War	July-48	8th Grand Prix de Suisse	Private	Talbot-Lago T26SS	7
Pre War	July-48	35th Grand Prix de l´ACF	Private	Talbot-Lago T26SS	10
Pre War	aug.-49	15th Grand Prix de voitures de sport de l´ACF – Comminges	Private	Delahaye 4.5-litre six	1
Pre War	oct.-49	6th Coupe du Salon	Private	Delahaye 135CS	4
Formula 1	July-50	37th Grand Prix de l´ACF	Ecurie Charles Pozzi	Talbot-Lago T26C	6
Sports Car	June-53	21st Grand Prix des 24 heures du Mans	Automobiles Talbot Darracq	Talbot-Lago T26GS	8

Note: 35th Grand Prix de L'ACF results shared with Louis Rosier as co-driver

- 1947, raced at:
  - Grand Prix of Pau,
  - Grand Prix Automobile of Marseille,
  - Circuit des Remparts in Angoulême,
  - Grand Prix du Comminges in Saint-Gaudens.
- 1948, raced at:
  - Grand Prix des Nations in Genève,
  - DNF at Grand Prix du Comminges in Saint-Gaudens (Talbot).
- 1949, raced at Grand Prix Automobile of Pau,
- 1952, won the 12 Hours of Casablanca, Morocco
- 1953, won :
  - the first position of the 12H of Hyères in the 2L category and at the third overall position,
  - the second position of the 12H of Reims in the 2L category and the 6th position in the overall ranking. For these two events, he raced on the Ferrari 166MM Berlinetta Vignale which belong to his teammate François Picard.
  - the third position at the 12 Hours of Agadir Morocco with a Lancia Aurelia
- 1954, finished :
  - the 12 hours of Hyères in 2nd position with a Ferrari 500 Mondial,
  - the 12 hours of Reims in 9th position with the same car.
  - the hillclimb de Planfoy.

== Pozzi's business ==
After his retirement from racing, he founded Charles Pozzi S.A., the official importer of Ferrari and Maserati motor vehicles in France. In 2003, the company was acquired by the Ferrari company. Ferrari dark blue paint Blu Pozzi was named in honour of Charles Pozzi.

Pozzi died in 2001 in Levallois-Perret, a suburb in western Paris.

== Complete Formula One World Championship results ==
(key)

Year	Entrant	Chassis	Engine	1	2	3	4	5	6	7	WDC	Points
1950	Ecurie Rosier	Talbot-Lago T26C	Talbot Straight-6	GBR	MON; DNA	500	SUI	BEL			NC	0
1950	Charles Pozzi	Talbot-Lago T26C	Talbot Straight-6						FRA; 6 *	ITA	NC	0

* Indicates shared drive with Louis Rosier
