= Raph (racing driver) =

French racing driver (1910–1994)

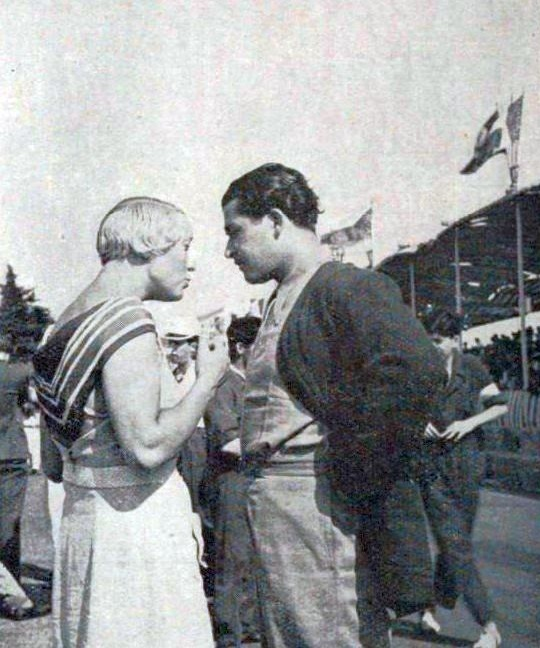
- Bethenod with Hellé Nice in 1935
- Born: Jules Raphaël Bethenod; 8 February 1910 Buenos Aires, Argentina
- Died: 16 June 1994 (aged 84) Neuilly-sur-Marne, Seine-Saint-Denis, France

Champ Car career
- 1 race run over 1 year
- First race: 1936 Vanderbilt Cup (Westbury)
Wins	Podiums	Poles
0	0	0

24 Hours of Le Mans career
- Years: 1935, 1937
- Teams: Hertzberger, Embiricos
- Best finish: DNF (1935, 1937)
- Class wins: 0

Jules Raphaël Bethenod (8 February 1910 – 16 June 1994) was a French racing driver. He styled himself as Comte Jules Raphaël Bethenod de Montbressieux, and commonly competed under the pseudonym "Raph".

== Racing career ==
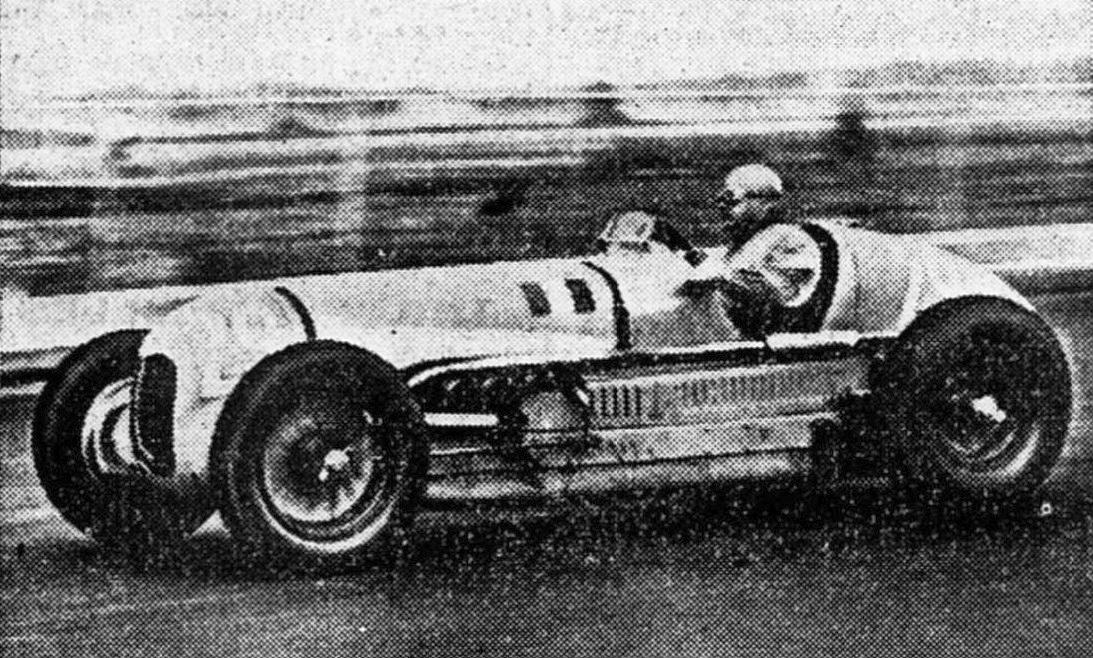
Bethenod in 1938

Bethenod competed in various European events. He also competed in the U.S. on occasion. In 1936, he finished 42nd in the AAA-sanctioned Vanderbilt Cup, being disqualified after a push start.

Bethenod submitted an entry for the 1946 Indianapolis 500, but failed to arrive.
