= Henri Louveau =

French racing driver (1910–1991)

- Born: 25 January 1910; Suresnes, Hauts-de-Seine
- Died: 7 January 1991 (aged 80); Orléans, Loiret

Formula One World Championship career
- Nationality: (France) French
- Active years: 1950–1951
- Team: non-works Talbot-Lago
- Entries: 2
- Championships: 0
- Wins: 0
- Podiums: 0
- Career points: 0
- Pole positions: 0
- Fastest laps: 0
- First entry: 1950 Italian Grand Prix
- Last entry: 1951 Swiss Grand Prix

24 Hours of Le Mans career
- Years: 1939, 1949 – 1951
- Teams: Victor Camerano; Private
- Best finish: 2nd (1949)
- Class wins: 0

Henri Louveau (25 January 1910 – 7 January 1991) was a French racing driver.

Louveau began his racing career in cycling, and later transitioned into cars. He served in the French Army during World War II, and was deployed in Africa. Louveau achieved second place during the 1949 24 Hours of Le Mans, competing with a Delage D6S. He competed in two Formula One Grands Prix utilizing Talbot-Lago cars, including the 1950 Italian Grand Prix and 1951 Swiss Grand Prix, but did not finish either race. As a result of a crash at the 1951 Swiss Grand Prix, Louveau retired from competitive racing. Following his retirement, he became a car salesman in Paris.

== Complete Formula One World Championship results ==
(key)

Year	Entrant	Chassis	Engine	1	2	3	4	5	6	7	8	WDC	Points
1950	Ecurie Rosier	Talbot-Lago T26C-GS	Talbot Straight-6	GBR	MON	500	SUI	BEL	FRA	ITA; Ret		NC	0
1951	Ecurie Rosier	Talbot-Lago T26C	Talbot Straight-6	SUI; Ret	500	BEL	FRA	GBR	GER	ITA	ESP	NC	0
