= Ferrari Indy V8 engine =

Ferrari Tipo 034

Overview
- Manufacturer: Ferrari
- Production: 1986

Layout
- Configuration: 90° V8
- Displacement: 2.65 L (2,649 cc; 161.65 cu in)
- Cylinder bore: 86 mm (3.39 in)
- Piston stroke: 57 mm (2.24 in)
- Valvetrain: 32-valve, DOHC, four-valves per cylinder
- Compression ratio: 11.5:1

Combustion
- Turbocharger: Single-turbocharged
- Fuel system: Mechanical multi-point fuel injection
- Fuel type: Methanol
- Oil system: Dry sump

Output
- Power output: 690–710 hp (515–529 kW)
- Torque output: 400–415 lb⋅ft (542–563 N⋅m)

The Tipo 034 is a turbocharged, 2.65-liter, V8 Indy racing engine designed and built by Ferrari for use in the CART PPG Indy Car World Series. Although track-tested and unveiled to the press in 1986, the engine was never raced.

== Technical ==
The Type 034 engine is a turbocharged, 90°, 32-valve, 2.65-liter V8. It's intake ports are along the outside of the vee, while the exhaust ports are inside the vee. It is methanol-fueled, has no intercooler, and runs 1.6 bar (23 psi) of turbo boost pressure, as per CART regulations.

== Applications ==
- Ferrari 637
