= Scuderia Ferrari =

Italian Formula One team

(Italy) Ferrari
- Full name: Scuderia Ferrari HP
- Base: Maranello, Modena, Italy 44.533124°N 10.863097°E
- Team principal(s): Fred Vasseur; Jérôme d'Ambrosio (Deputy Team Principal)
- Technical Director(s): Loïc Serra (Technical Director – Chassis); Enrico Gualtieri (Technical Director – Power Unit)
- Founder(s): Enzo Ferrari
- Website: ferrari.com/formula1

2026 Formula One World Championship
- Race drivers: 16. (Monaco) Charles Leclerc; 44. (United Kingdom) Lewis Hamilton
- Test driver(s): 99. (Italy) Antonio Giovinazzi
- Chassis: SF-26
- Engine: Ferrari
- Tyres: Pirelli

Formula One World Championship career
- First entry: 1950 Monaco Grand Prix
- Last entry: 2026 São Paulo Grand Prix
- Races entered: 1144 (Note: Includes NART entries.) (1141 starts (Note: Includes NART entries. Does not include the 1950 French Grand Prix, where the team-entered cars did not start the race but Peter Whitehead in a privately entered car did.))
- Engines: Ferrari
- Constructors' Championships: 16 (1961, 1964, 1975, 1976, 1977, 1979, 1982, 1983, 1999, 2000, 2001, 2002, 2003, 2004, 2007, 2008)
- Drivers' Championships: 15 (1952, 1953, 1956, 1958, 1961, 1964, 1975, 1977, 1979, 2000, 2001, 2002, 2003, 2004, 2007)
- Race victories: 249 (Note: Does not include Giancarlo Baghetti's win in the 1961 French Grand Prix in a privately entered Ferrari.)
- Podiums: 844 (Note: Includes NART entries. Does not include five podium finishes achieved in privately entered Ferraris.)
- Pole positions: 255
- Fastest laps: 270 (Note: This is the number of different World Championship races in which a team-entered Ferrari set the fastest lap time. In both the 1954 British Grand Prix and 1970 Austrian Grand Prix, two drivers each set equal fastest lap time in team-entered Ferraris. This number does not include Giancarlo Baghetti's fastest lap in the 1961 Italian Grand Prix in a privately entered Ferrari.)
- 2025 position: 4th (398 pts)

Ferrari as a Formula One chassis constructor
Formula One World Championship career
- Engines: Ferrari, Jaguar
- Entrants: Scuderia Ferrari, NART, numerous minor teams and privateers between 1950 and 1966
- First entry: 1950 Monaco Grand Prix
- Last entry: 2026 São Paulo Grand Prix
- Races entered: 1144 (1142 starts (Note: Includes the 1950 French Grand Prix, where the team-entered cars did not start the race but Peter Whitehead in a privately entered car did.))
- Race victories: 250 (Note: Includes Giancarlo Baghetti's win in the 1961 French Grand Prix in a privately entered Ferrari.)
- Constructors' Championships: 16 (1961, 1964, 1975, 1976, 1977, 1979, 1982, 1983, 1999, 2000, 2001, 2002, 2003, 2004, 2007, 2008)
- Drivers' Championships: 15 (1952, 1953, 1956, 1958, 1961, 1964, 1975, 1977, 1979, 2000, 2001, 2002, 2003, 2004, 2007)
- Podiums: 849
- Points: WCC: 11232; WDC: 12133.77 (Note: The extra 901.77 points (in drivers' vs. constructors' tally) are Ferrari drivers' points from 1950 to 1957, before the World Constructors' Championship was established in 1958, plus the fact that before 1979, only the highest-placed car per constructor scored points towards the Constructors' Championship)
- Pole positions: 255
- Fastest laps: 271 (Note: This is the number of different World Championship races in which a Ferrari car set the fastest lap time. In both the 1954 British Grand Prix and 1970 Austrian Grand Prix, two drivers each set equal fastest lap time in Ferraris. This number includes Giancarlo Baghetti's fastest lap in the 1961 Italian Grand Prix in a privately entered Ferrari.)

Ferrari as a Formula One engine manufacturer
Formula One World Championship career
- First entry: 1950 Monaco Grand Prix
- Last entry: 2026 São Paulo Grand Prix
- Races entered: 1148 (1144 starts)
- Chassis: Ferrari, Kurtis Kraft, Cooper, De Tomaso, Minardi, Dallara, Lola, Red Bull, Toro Rosso, Spyker, Force India, Sauber, Marussia, Haas, Alfa Romeo, Cadillac
- Constructors' Championships: 16 (1961, 1964, 1975, 1976, 1977, 1979, 1982, 1983, 1999, 2000, 2001, 2002, 2003, 2004, 2007, 2008)
- Drivers' Championships: 15 (1952, 1953, 1956, 1958, 1961, 1964, 1975, 1977, 1979, 2000, 2001, 2002, 2003, 2004, 2007)
- Race victories: 251
- Podiums: 856
- Points: WCC: 12492; WDC: 13084.79
- Pole positions: 257
- Fastest laps: 280

Ferrari S.p.A, competing as Scuderia Ferrari HP (/fəˈrɑːri/; Italian: [skudeˈriːa ferˈraːri]), is the racing division of luxury Italian auto manufacturer Ferrari and the racing team that competes in Formula One racing. The team is also known by the nickname "the Prancing Horse" (Italian: il Cavallino Rampante or simply il Cavallino), in reference to their logo. It is the oldest surviving and most successful Formula One team, having competed in every World Championship since 1950.

The team was founded by Enzo Ferrari in 1929, initially to race cars produced by Alfa Romeo. By 1947, Ferrari had begun building its own cars. Among its important achievements outside Formula One are winning the FIA World Endurance Championship, World Sportscar Championship, 24 Hours of Le Mans, 24 Hours of Daytona, 12 Hours of Sebring, 24 Hours of Spa, Targa Florio, and Mille Miglia. Its customers have also secured victories at events including Petit Le Mans, Nürburgring 24 Hours, Bathurst 12 Hour, and Carrera Panamericana. The team is known for its passionate support base, known as the tifosi. The Italian Grand Prix at Monza is regarded as the team's home race.

As a constructor in Formula One, Ferrari has a record 16 Constructors' Championships. Their most recent Constructors' Championship was won in 2008. The team also holds the record for the most Drivers' Championships with 15, won by nine different drivers including Alberto Ascari, Juan Manuel Fangio, Mike Hawthorn, Phil Hill, John Surtees, Niki Lauda, Jody Scheckter, Michael Schumacher, and Kimi Räikkönen. Räikkönen's title in 2007 is the most recent for the team. The 2020 Tuscan Grand Prix marked Ferrari's 1000th Grand Prix in Formula One.

Schumacher is the team's most successful driver. Joining the team in 1996 and driving for them until his first retirement in 2006, he won five consecutive drivers' titles and 72 Grands Prix for the team. His titles came consecutively between 2000 and 2004, and the team won consecutive constructors' titles between 1999 and 2004, marking the era as the most successful period in the team's history. The team's drivers for the 2026 season are Charles Leclerc and seven-time Formula One World Champion Lewis Hamilton.

== History ==
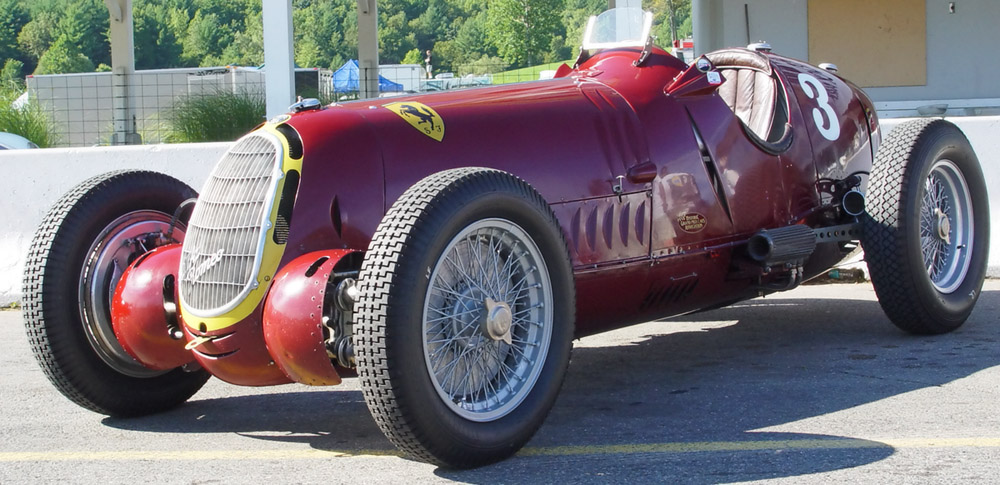
Alfa Romeo 8C 2900 Scuderia Ferrari

Scuderia Ferrari was founded by Enzo Ferrari in 1929 to enter amateur drivers in various races. Ferrari himself had raced in Costruzioni Meccaniche Nazionali and Alfa Romeo cars before that date. The idea came about on the night of 16 November at a dinner in Bologna, where Ferrari solicited financial help from textile heirs Augusto and Alfredo Caniato and wealthy amateur racer Mario Tadini. He then gathered a team which at its peak included over forty drivers, most of whom raced in various Alfa Romeo 8C cars; Ferrari himself continued racing, with moderate success, until the birth of his first son Dino in 1932. The prancing horse blazon first appeared at the 1932 Spa 24 Hours in Belgium on a two-car team of Alfa Romeo 8C 2300 Spiders, which finished first and second.

In 1933, Alfa Romeo experienced economic difficulties and withdrew its team from racing. From then, the Scuderia Ferrari became the acting racing team of Alfa Romeo when the factory released to the Scuderia the up to date Monoposto Tipo B racers. In 1935, Enzo Ferrari and Luigi Bazzi built the Alfa Romeo Bimotore, the first car to wear a Ferrari badge on the radiator cowl. Ferrari managed numerous established drivers (notably Tazio Nuvolari, Giuseppe Campari, Achille Varzi, and Louis Chiron) and several talented rookies (Mario Tadini, Guy Moll, Carlo Maria Pintacuda, and Antonio Brivio) from his headquarters in Viale Trento e Trieste, Modena, Italy, until 1938, at which point Alfa Romeo made him the manager of the factory racing division, Alfa Corse. Alfa Romeo had bought the shares of the Scuderia Ferrari in 1937 and transferred, from 1 January 1938, the official racing activity to Alfa Corse whose new buildings were being erected next to the Alfa factory at Portello, Milan. The Viale Trento e Trieste facilities remained active to assist the racing customers.

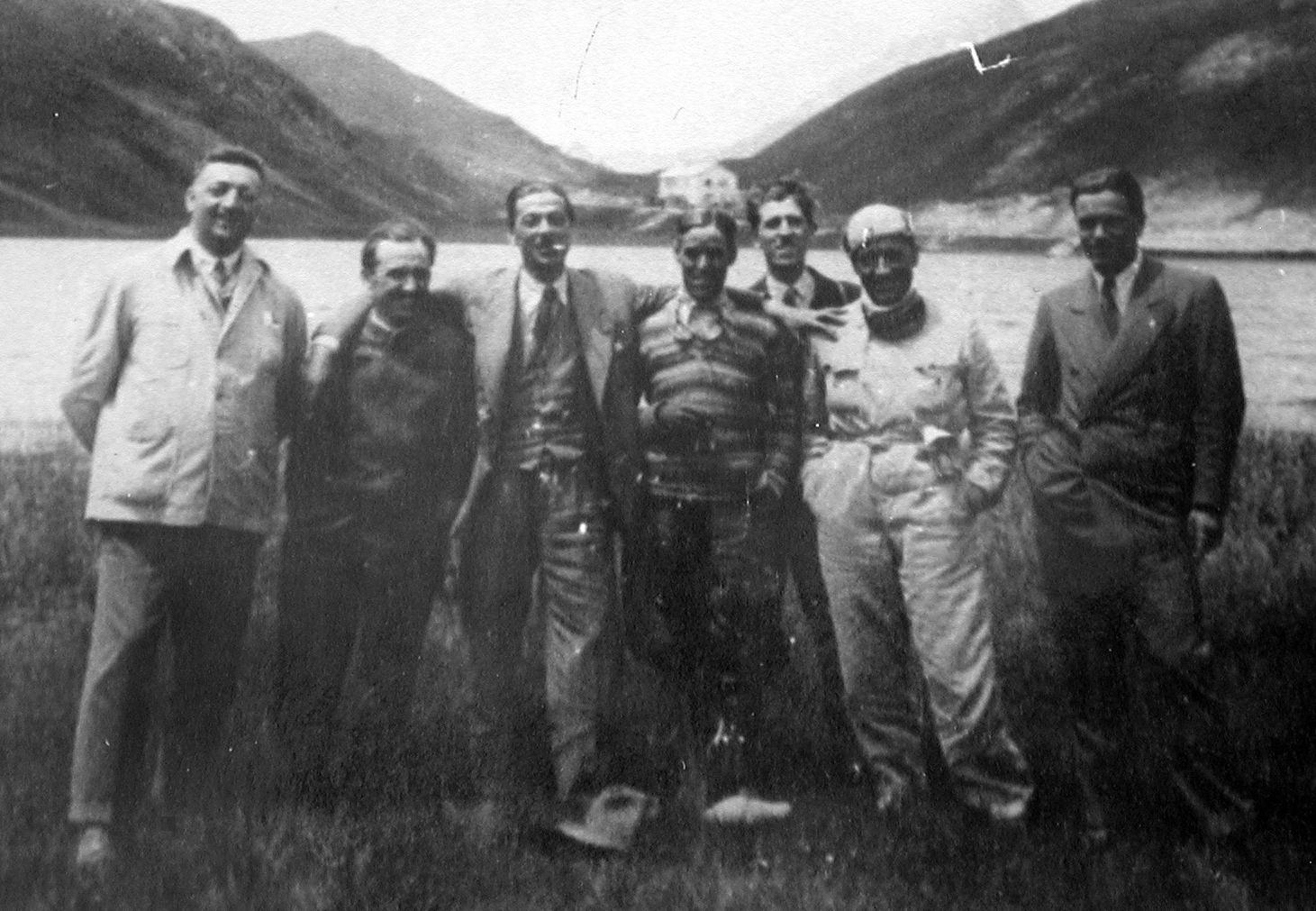
Enzo Ferrari (first from left), Tazio Nuvolari (fourth), and Achille Varzi (sixth) with Alfa Romeo managing director Prospero Gianferrari (third) at Colle Maddalena

Enzo Ferrari disagreed with this policy change and was dismissed by Alfa in 1939. In October 1939, Enzo Ferrari left Alfa when the racing activity stopped and founded Auto Avio Costruzioni Ferrari, which also manufactured machine tools. The agreement with Alfa included the condition that he would not use the Ferrari name on cars for four years. In the winter of 1939–1940, Ferrari started work on a racecar of his own, the Tipo 815 (eight cylinders, 1.5 L displacement). The 815s, designed by Alberto Massimino, were thus the first true Ferrari cars. After Alberto Ascari and the Marchese Lotario Rangoni Machiavelli di Modena drove them in the 1940 Mille Miglia, World War II put a temporary end to racing and the 815s saw no more competition. Ferrari continued to manufacture machine tools (specifically oleodynamic grinding machines). In 1943, he moved his headquarters to Maranello, where it was bombed in November 1944 and February 1945.

Rules for a Grand Prix World Championship had been discussed before the war; it took several years afterwards for the series to become active. Meanwhile, Ferrari rebuilt his works in Maranello and constructed the 12-cylinder, 1.5 L Tipo 125, which competed at several non-championship Grands Prix. The car made its debut at the 1948 Italian Grand Prix with Raymond Sommer and achieved its first win at the minor Circuito di Garda with Giuseppe Farina. After the four-year condition expired, the road car company was called Ferrari S.p.A., while the name SEFAC (Società Esercizio Fabbriche Automobili e Corse) was used for the racing department.

=== Headquarters ===
The team was based in Modena from its pre-war founding until 1943, when Enzo Ferrari moved the team to a new factory in Maranello in 1943, and both Scuderia Ferrari and Ferrari's road car factory remain at Maranello to this day. The team owns and operates a test track on the same site, the Fiorano Circuit built in 1972, which is used for testing road and race cars.

=== Identity ===
The team is named after its founder Enzo Ferrari. Scuderia is Italian for a stable reserved for racing horses, and is also commonly applied to Italian motor racing teams. The prancing horse was the symbol used on Italian World War I ace Francesco Baracca's fighter plane. It became the logo of Ferrari after the fallen ace's parents, close acquaintances of Enzo Ferrari, suggested that Ferrari use the symbol as the logo of the Scuderia, telling him it would "bring him good luck".

== Formula One ==
Since its debut in 1950, Ferrari has become a byword for Formula One. For many, Ferrari and Formula One racing have become inseparable, being the only team to have competed in every season since the world championship began.

=== Engine supply ===
Ferrari produces engines for its own Formula One cars and has supplied engines to other teams.

Ferrari has previously supplied engines to Minardi (1991), Scuderia Italia (1992–1993), Sauber (1997–2005 with engines badged as Petronas, and 2010–2025), Prost (2001, badged Acer), Red Bull Racing (2006), Spyker (2007), Scuderia Toro Rosso (2007–2013, 2016), Force India (2008), and Marussia (2014–2015).

For the 2026 season, Ferrari supplies the Haas F1 Team and Cadillac. In December 2024, Ferrari announced that the forthcoming Cadillac Formula One team had signed a multi-year deal to use their engines and gearboxes from 2026 onwards, until GM PPU develops an F1-ready power unit.

=== Relationship with governing body ===
Ferrari did not enter the first-ever race of the championship, the 1950 British Grand Prix, due to a dispute with the organisers over "start money". In the 1960s, Ferrari withdrew from several races in strike actions. In 1987, Ferrari considered abandoning Formula One for the American IndyCar series. This threat was used as a bargaining tool with the Fédération Internationale de l'Automobile (FIA), and Enzo Ferrari offered to cancel the IndyCar Project and commit to Formula One on the condition that the technical regulations were not changed to exclude V12 engines. The FIA agreed to this, and the IndyCar project was shelved, although a car, the Ferrari 637, had already been constructed. In 2009, it had emerged that Ferrari had an FIA-sanctioned veto on the technical regulations.

=== Team orders controversies ===
Team orders have proven controversial at several points in Ferrari's history. At the 1982 San Marino Grand Prix, the two Ferraris were leading with Gilles Villeneuve ahead of Didier Pironi. The team showed the slow sign to its drivers, and, as per a pre-race agreement, the driver leading at that point was expected to take the win of the Grand Prix. Villeneuve slowed and expected that Pironi would follow; the latter did not and instead passed Villeneuve. Villeneuve was angered by what he saw as a betrayal by his teammate and, at one point, had even refused to go onto the podium. This feud is often considered to have been a contributory factor to his fatal accident in qualifying at the next race, the 1982 Belgian Grand Prix.

At the 2002 Austrian Grand Prix, after having started from pole position and leading the first 70 laps, Rubens Barrichello was instructed to let Ferrari teammate Michael Schumacher pass him, a move that proved to be unpopular among many Formula One fans and the FIA, the sport's governing body. Following this incident and others in which team orders were used, such as McLaren's use of them at the 1997 European Grand Prix and at the 1998 Australian Grand Prix, and Jordan Grand Prix's at the 1998 Belgian Grand Prix, team orders in Formula One were officially banned ahead of the 2003 season.

On lap 49 of the 2010 German Grand Prix, Fernando Alonso went past Felipe Massa for the race lead, after Ferrari had informed Massa that Alonso was "faster than him". This communication has widely been interpreted as a team order from Ferrari. Alonso won the race, with Massa finishing second and Sebastian Vettel taking the final place on the podium. Ferrari were fined the maximum penalty available to the stewards, $100,000, for breach of regulations and for "bringing the sport into disrepute" as per "Article 151c' of the International Sporting Code". Ferrari said they would not contest the fine. The team were referred to the FIA World Motor Sport Council, where they upheld the stewards' view but did not take any further action. The ban on team orders was subsequently lifted for the 2011 season.

=== Racing colours ===
In keeping with their Italian roots, the Ferrari works team has always kept a red colour in the tradition of rosso corsa, the national racing colour of Italy, except for last two races in the 1964 season (the 1964 United States Grand Prix and 1964 Mexican Grand Prix) when Enzo Ferrari let his cars be entered by the NART team in American national racing colours (white with blue lengthwise "Cunningham racing stripes") to protest against Italian racing authorities. However, Ferrari cars entered by non-Italian privateer teams wore their respective national racing colours until the 1961 Belgian Grand Prix when Belgian driver Olivier Gendebien privately entered a Ferrari car painted in the Belgian racing yellow colour, scoring 4th behind three other Ferrari cars painted in red as they were entered by the Scuderia Ferrari works team itself, and driven by US drivers Phil Hill and Richie Ginther as well as German Wolfgang von Trips.

Ferrari won the 1964 World championship with John Surtees by competing the last two races (the United States Grand Prix and Mexican Grand Prix) in Ferrari 158 cars painted white with blue lengthwise "Cunningham racing stripes" -the national colours of the teams licensed in the United States- as these were entered not by the Italian works team themselves but by the American NART team. This was done as a protest against the agreement between Ferrari and the Italian Racing Authorities regarding their planned mid-engined Ferrari race car. Since Ferrari cars entered in 1965 and 1969 seasons by the NART team and at the 1966 Italian Grand Prix by the British privateer team Reg Parnell kept wearing the red colour, the 1964 Mexican Grand Prix was the last time Ferrari cars wore other than the traditional red colour in Formula One.

=== Formula One team sponsorship ===
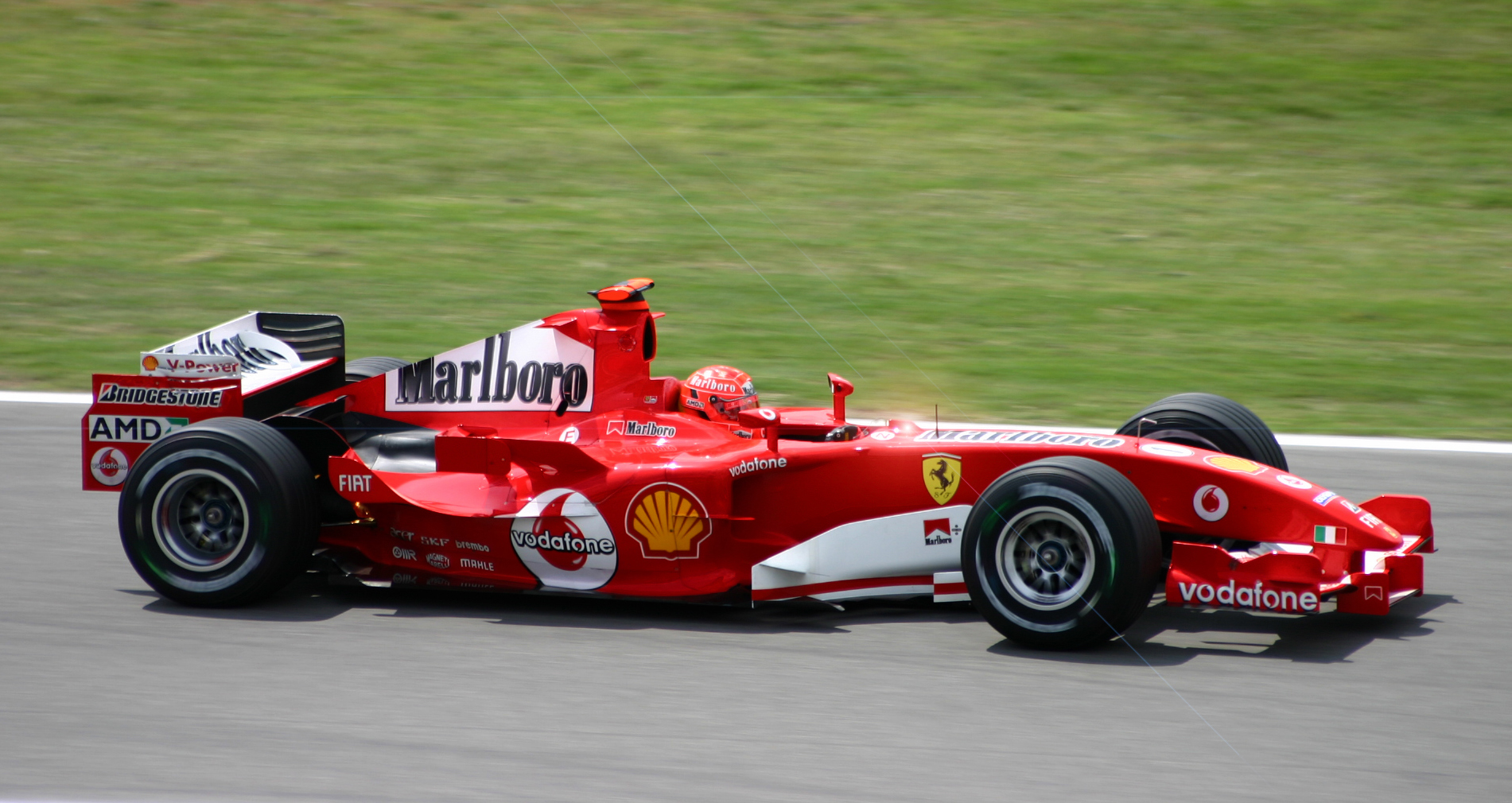
Various company logos on display on Michael Schumacher's F2005 during the 2005 German Grand Prix, showing sponsorship such as from Philip Morris, Shell, Vodafone, Bridgestone and AMD

The Ferrari Formula One team was resistant to the commercial sponsorship for many years and it was not until 1977 that the cars began to feature the logo of the Fiat group (which had been the owners of the Ferrari company since 1969). Until the 1980s, the only other companies whose logos appeared on Ferrari's Formula One cars were technical partners, such as Magneti Marelli, Brembo, and Agip. At the end of the 1996 season, Philip Morris International through its brand Marlboro withdrew its sponsorship agreement with McLaren after 22 years (since the 1974 season) to become the title sponsor of Ferrari, resulting to the change of the official team's name to Scuderia Ferrari Marlboro from the beginning of the 1997 season until the 2011 European Grand Prix. Marlboro had already been Ferrari's minor sponsor since the 1984 season and increased to the team's major sponsorship in the 1993 season.

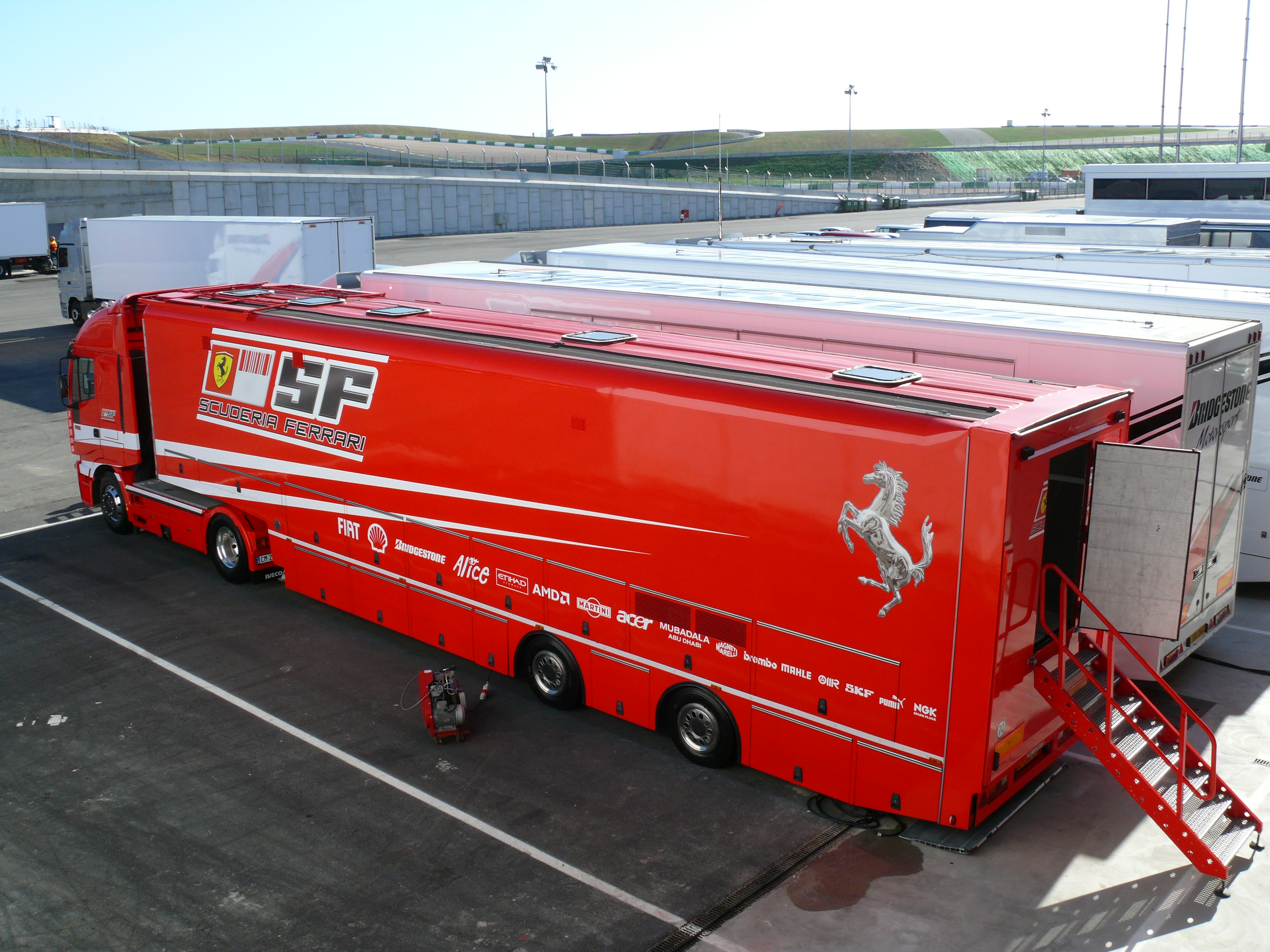
A Ferrari truck displaying Ferrari's sponsors in 2008

Alongside Jordan Grand Prix, the team was required to run non-tobacco liveries in United States Grand Prix in the 2000s due to United States Tobacco Master Settlement Agreement requirements, as Phillip Morris was sponsoring Team Penske at the time; a clause in the settlement allowed each tobacco company to sponsor only one sporting entity. In September 2005, Ferrari signed an extension of the arrangement until 2011 at a time when advertising of tobacco sponsorship had become illegal in the European Union, and other major teams had withdrawn from relationships with tobacco companies (e.g. McLaren had ended its eight-year relationship with West). In reporting the deal, F1 Racing magazine judged it to be a black day for the sport, putting non-tobacco funded teams at a disadvantage and discouraging other brands from entering a sport still associated with tobacco. The magazine estimated that between 2005 and 2011, Ferrari received $1 billion from the agreement. The last time Ferrari ran explicit tobacco sponsorship on the car was at the 2007 Chinese Grand Prix, with barcodes and other subliminal markers used afterwards.

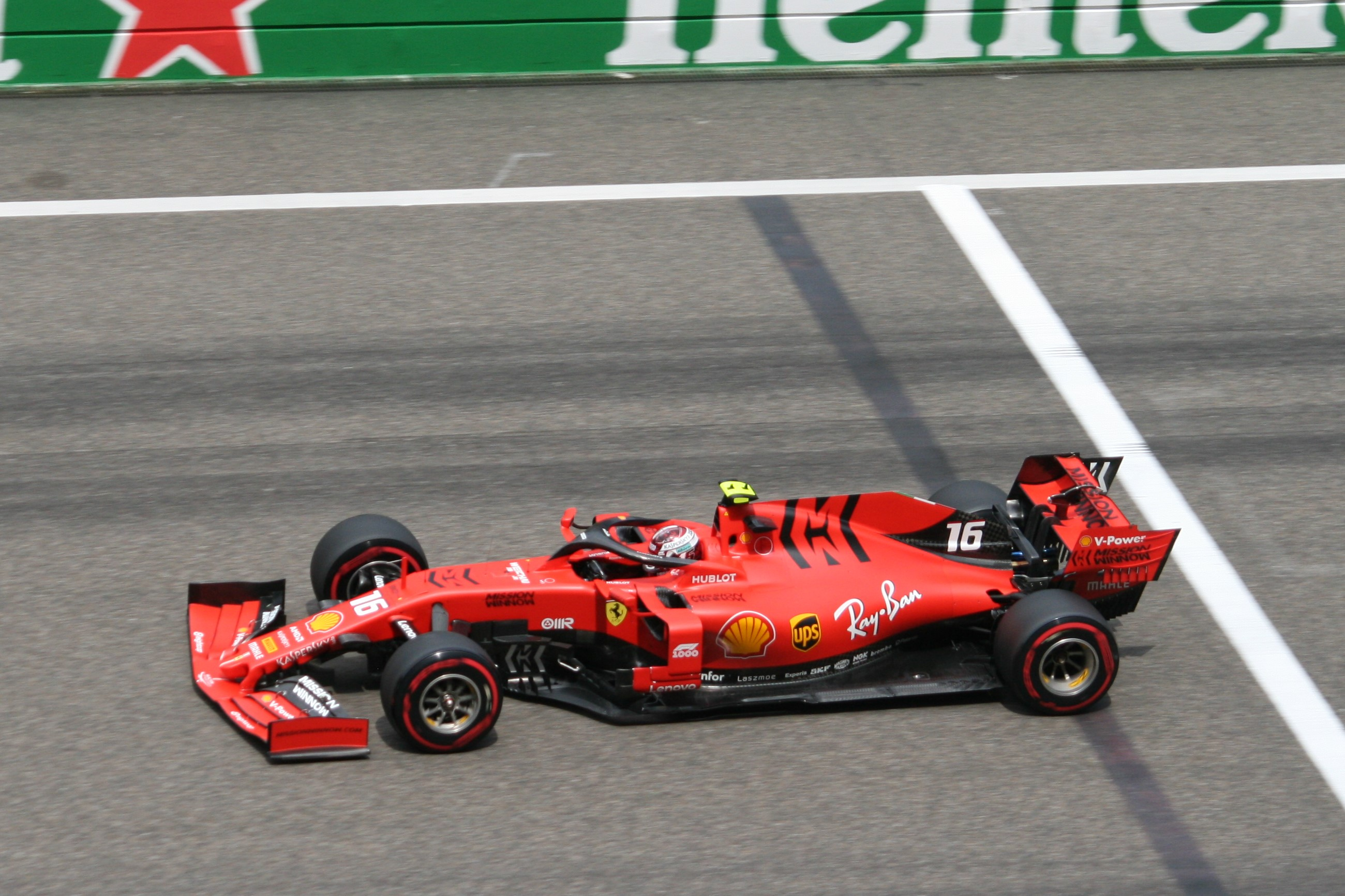
Ferrari SF90, driven by Charles Leclerc, with Mission Winnow branding at the 2019 Chinese Grand Prix

On 8 July 2011, it was announced that the Marlboro section of its official team name had been removed from the 2011 British Grand Prix onwards, following complaints from sponsorship regulators. As a consequence, the official team's name was reverted to Scuderia Ferrari. At the 2018 Japanese Grand Prix, Ferrari added Philip Morris International's new Mission Winnow project logos to the car and team clothing. Although Mission Winnow is described as a non-tobacco brand "dedicated to science, technology and innovation", commentators such as The Guardian's Richard Williams have noted that the logos incorporate elements whose shapes mimic the iconic Marlboro cigarette packet design. In 2019, Mission Winnow became the team's title sponsor, and the team originally entered the 2019 season as Scuderia Ferrari Mission Winnow. Mission Winnow was dropped from team name before the season opener, while the car's Mission Winnow logos were replaced by a special 90th anniversary logo, after Australian authorities had launched an investigation into whether the initiative introduced by Philip Morris contravened laws banning tobacco advertising. Mission Winnow was restored for the second race of the season, and was used until the Monaco Grand Prix. The Mission Winnow logos were again replaced by the 90th anniversary logos for the Canadian until the Russian Grand Prix. The Mission Winnow branding returned at the Japanese Grand Prix. At the end of the 2021 season, the Mission Winnow sponsorship was dropped to promote new technologies.

On 10 September 2009, Ferrari announced that it would be sponsored by Santander from 2010 on a five-year contract. The contract was subsequently extended to end in late 2017. After a four-year break, Santander and Ferrari renewed their partnership on 21 December 2021 with a multi-year contract. As part of the deal with Acer, Acer was allowed to sell Ferrari-badged laptops. On the other hand, semiconductor chip maker AMD, announced in early 2009 that it had decided to drop its sponsorship of the team and was waiting for its contract to expire after its former vice-president/sales executive (who was an avid fan of motorsports) had left the company. AMD returned to sponsor the team in 2018. On 3 July 2014, Ferrari announced a two-year sponsorship agreement with the United States–based Haas Automation tool company, which transferred into a powertrain deal in 2016 when the Haas F1 Team entered the sport.

On 14 April 2018, AMD announced a multi-year sponsorship with Scuderia Ferrari on the occasion of the Chinese Grand Prix held on the Shanghai Circuit. The AMD logo was visible on the nose of the Ferrari SF71H. In December 2021, the team extended its 10-year partnership with Kaspersky Lab, which also became its esports team partner. This deal was terminated following the 2022 Russian invasion of Ukraine. The official suppliers of Ferrari for the 2021 season included Pirelli, Puma, Radiobook, Experis-Veritaaq, SKF, Magneti Marelli, NGK, Brembo, Riedel Communications, VistaJet, and Iveco. Other suppliers included Alfa Romeo, Palantir Technologies, Bell Sports, and Sabelt. The companies sponsoring Ferrari for the 2021 season included Shell, Ray-Ban, United Parcel Service, Estrella Galicia, Weichai Group, Richard Mille, Mahle GmbH, Amazon Web Services, and Officine Meccaniche Rezzatesi.

On 24 April 2024, the team announced a multi-year title partnership with HP Inc., renaming the team (including E-sports and F1 Academy) as Scuderia Ferrari HP from the 2024 Miami Grand Prix onwards.

== Other racing series ==
=== Formula Two ===
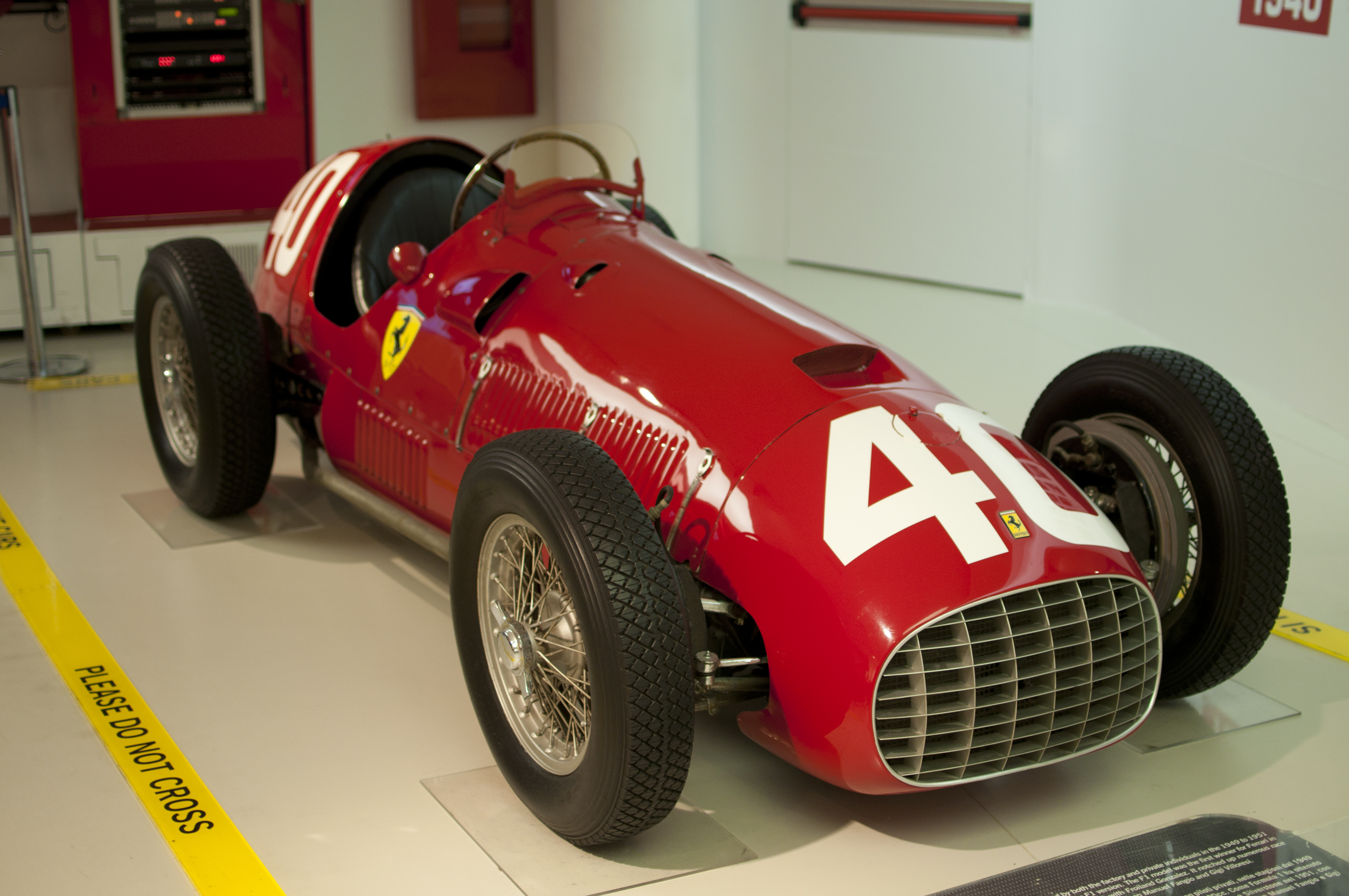
Ferrari 166 F2

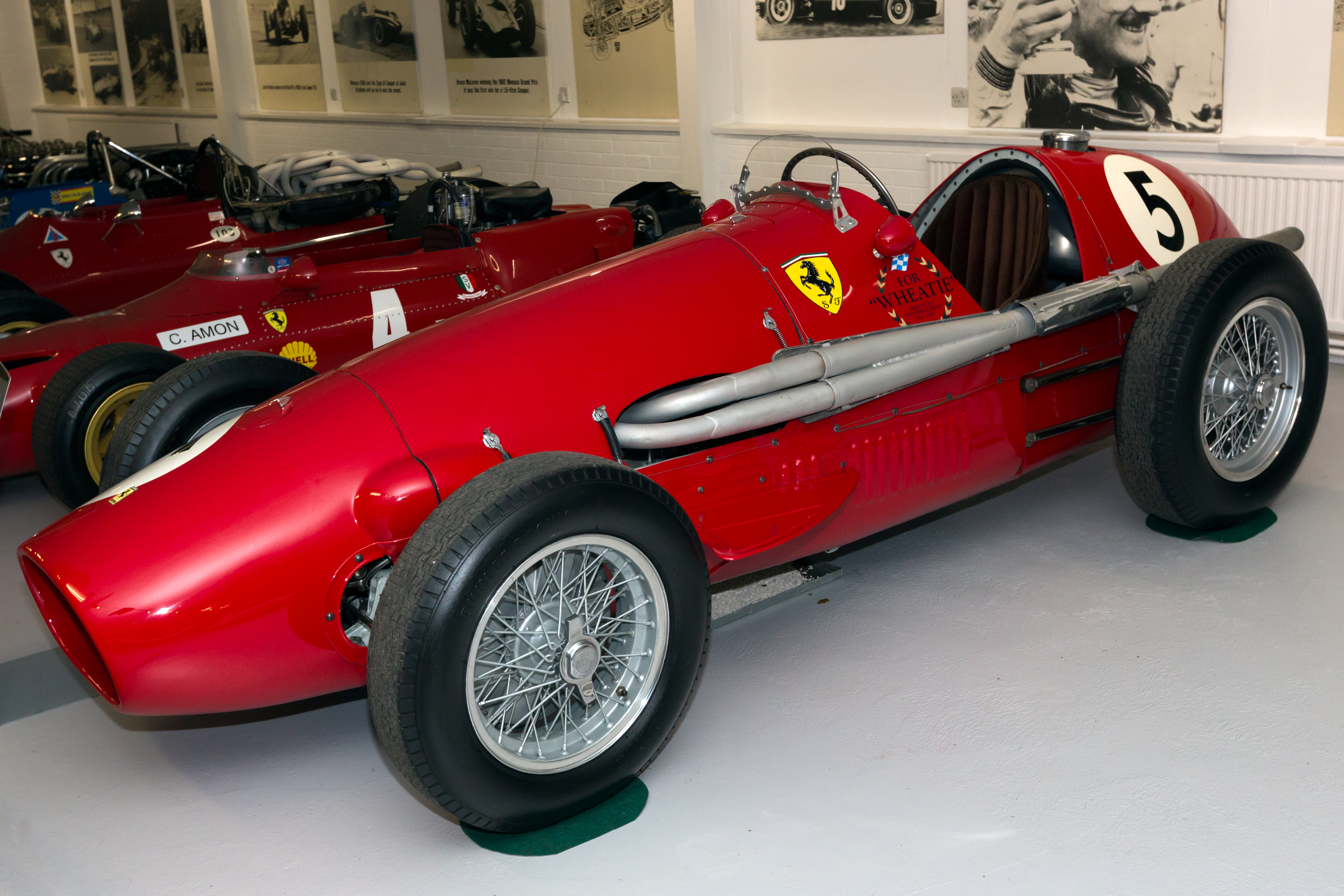
Ferrari 500 F2

Ferrari competed in the Formula 2 series in several years, as follows:

- 1948–1951: 166 F2
- 1951–1953: 500 F2
- 1953: 553 F2
- 1957–1960: Dino 156 F2
- 1967–1969: Dino 166 F2

=== Sportscar racing ===
From the late 1940s to the early 1970s, Ferrari competed in sports car racing with great success, winning the overall World Sportscar Championship (WSC) twelve times. Ferrari cars (including non-works entries) won the Mille Miglia eight times, the Targa Florio seven times, and the 24 Hours of Le Mans nine times. In this span of time, Ferrari was almost the only constructor able to support the participation in both the two most important categories of international car motor racing at the time, i.e. the Formula One and endurance racing championships. The fact that it did so, achieving remarkable success with few resources and coming from an impoverished post-World War II Italy, it is seen as a testament to the prowess, passion, and dedication to the men of the Scuderia and its founder. Ferrari scored international successes in sports car racing while still at the startup phase, taking wins in 1948 at the Mille Miglia and at the Targa Florio with the Ferrari 166 S and in 1949 at the Mille Miglia, at the12 Hours of Paris, at the 24 Hours of Spa, at the Targa Florio, and at the 24 Hours of Le Mans all in the same season. This remarkable streak of victories was achieved with the 2-litre Ferrari 166 MM against larger engined sports cars and already known marques. The 166MM in its famous barchetta form represented also a milestone in car design history and was soon copied abroad, ending up revisited in the lines of the Shelby Cobra of the early 1960s. Ferrari cars, being able to win at the first try at Le Mans and to triumph in all the major races of the time, become soon a product of excellence and famous, rich people started to desire and buy them.

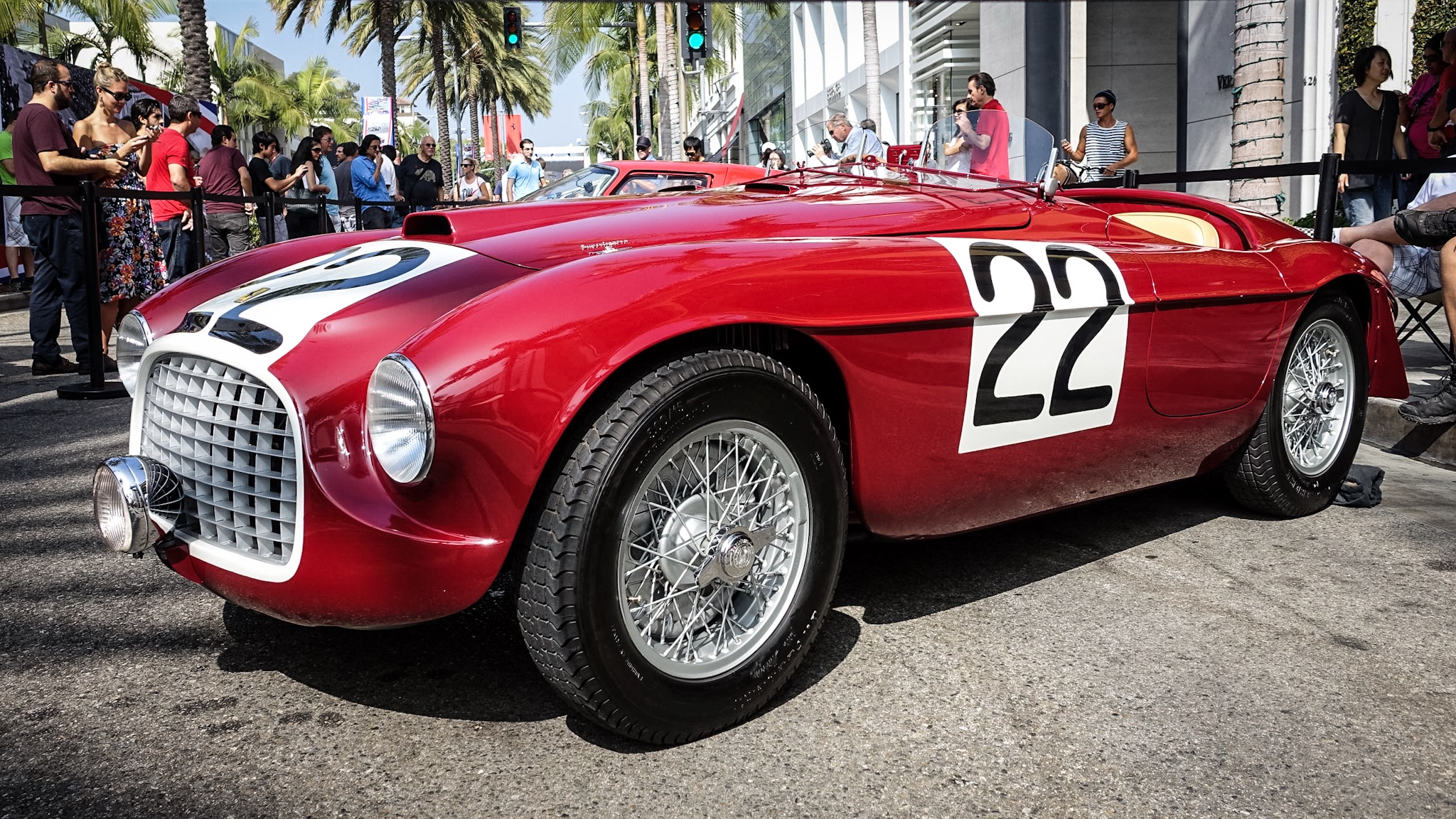
1949 Mille Miglia and Le Mans-winning Ferrari 166 MM

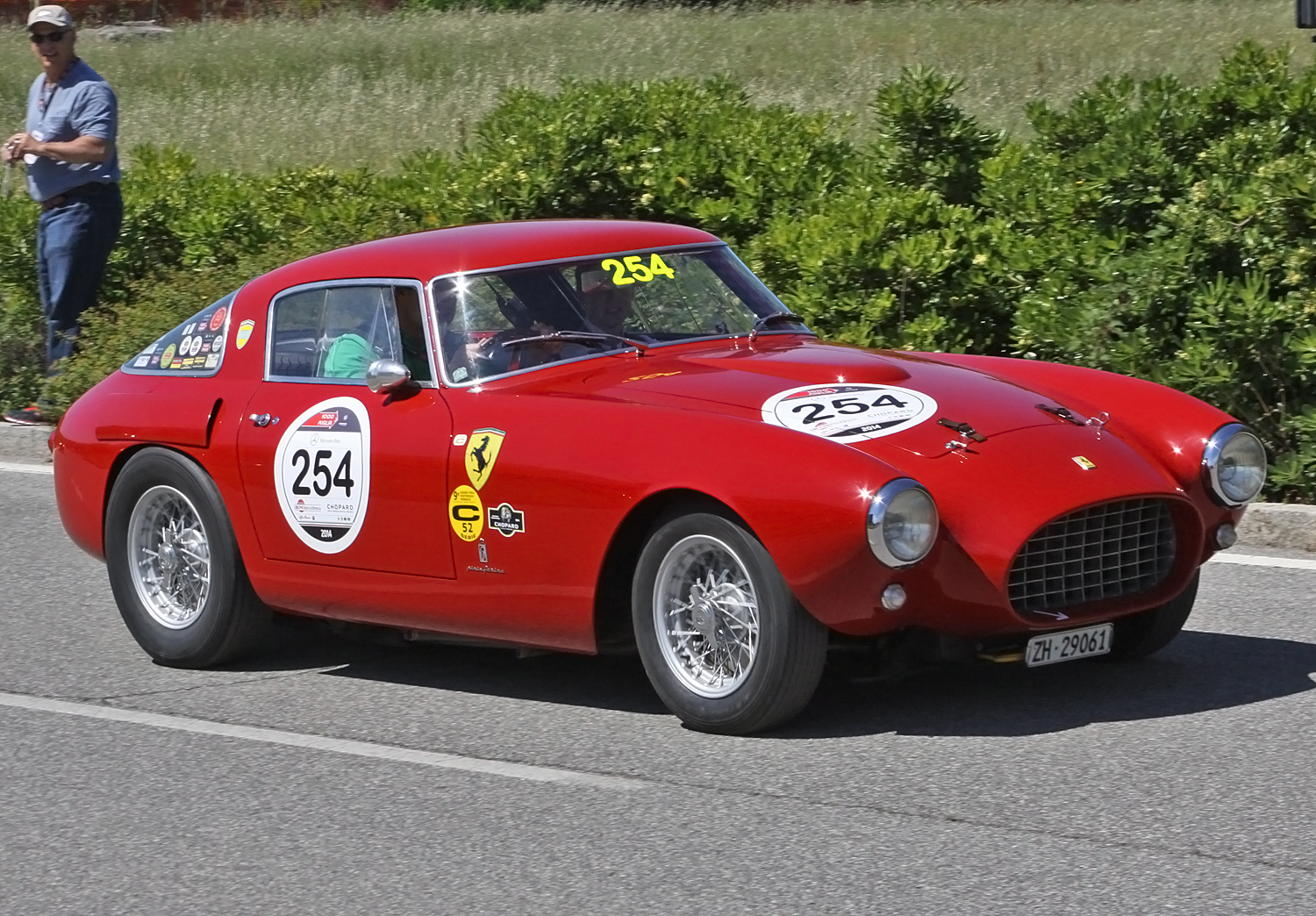
Ferrari 250 MM

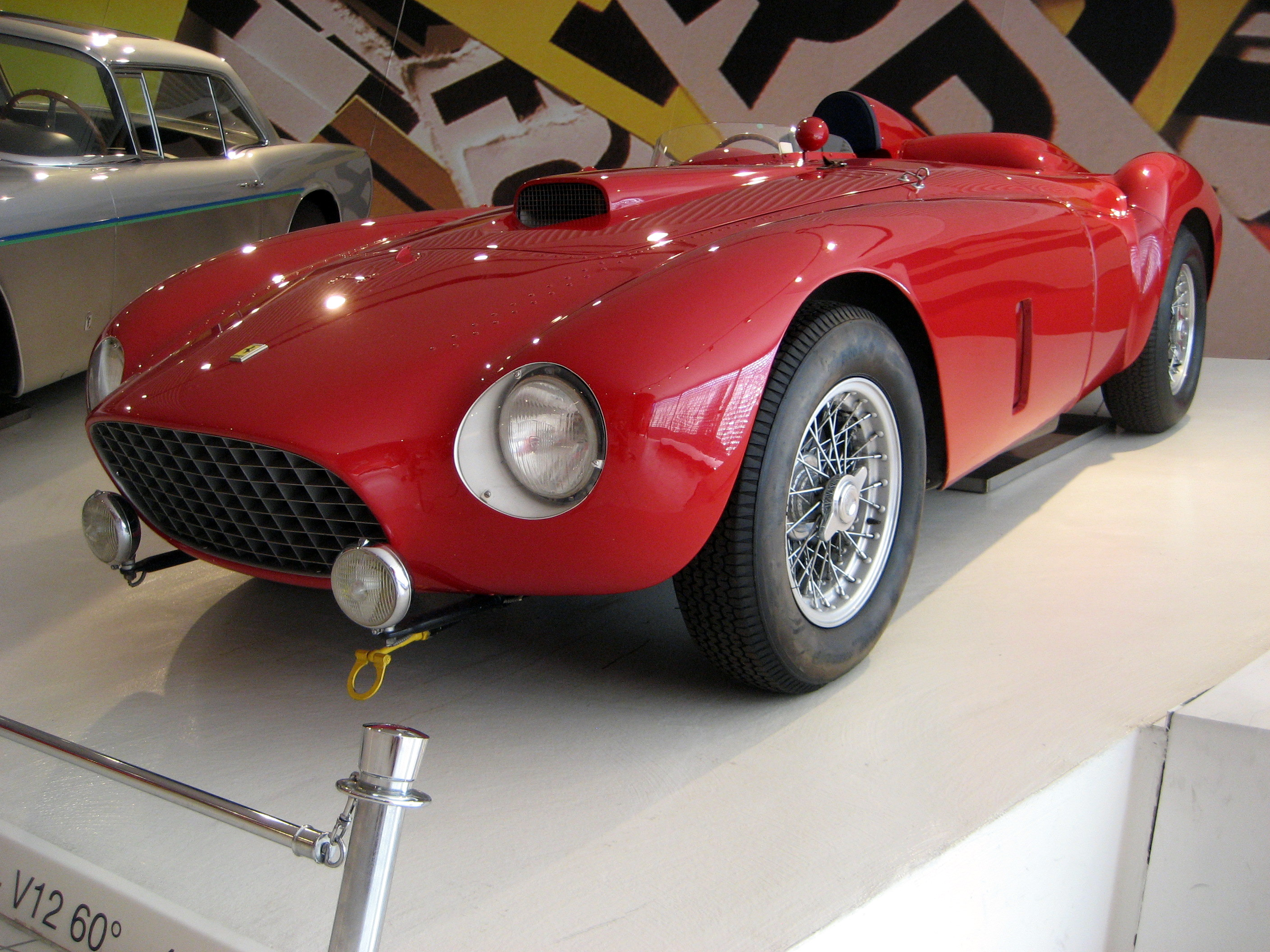
Ferrari 375 Plus that won Silverstone International in 1954

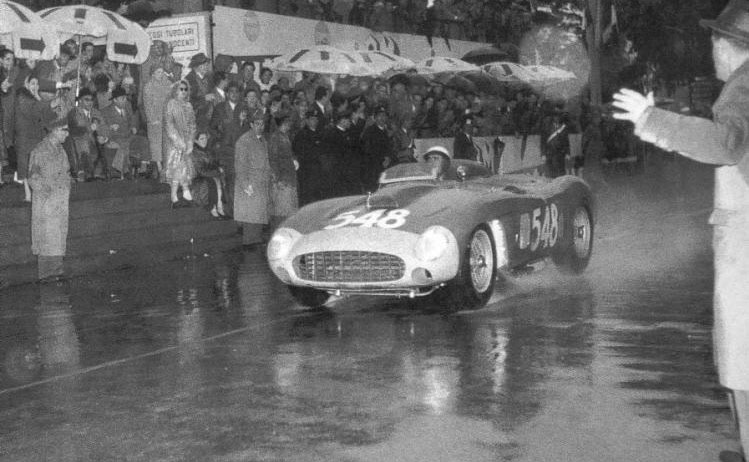
Eugenio Castellotti winning the 1956 Mille Miglia with Ferrari 290 MM

The streak of prestigious victories continued the following seasons with wins at the Carrera Panamericana in 1951, at the 1950 and 1951 Mille Miglia, and almost at the same time Ferrari started to win in Formula One at several international events. In 1953, with the creation of the WSC, Ferrari, along with other manufacturers like Aston Martin, Maserati, Mercedes-Benz, and Jaguar began to enter multiple factory-backed cars in races, such as the Carrera Panamericana in Mexico, the 24 Hours of Le Mans in France, the Mille Miglia in Italy, the 24 Hours of Spa in Belgium, the Nürburgring 1000 km in Germany, and the Sicilian Targa Florio. Ferrari launched a large range of sports racers over the next three years. This included the traditional compact Colombo V12-powered Ferrari 250 MM; the larger V12 Lampredi-powered 340 MM, 375 MM, 375 Plus, and 410 S; and Jano-powered 290 MM, 315 S, and 335 S; the four-cylinder 500, 625, 750, and 860 Monzas; and the six-cylinder 376 S and 735 LM. With this potent line-up, Ferrari was able to claim six of the first seven WSC titles (1953, 1954, 1956, 1957, and 1958).

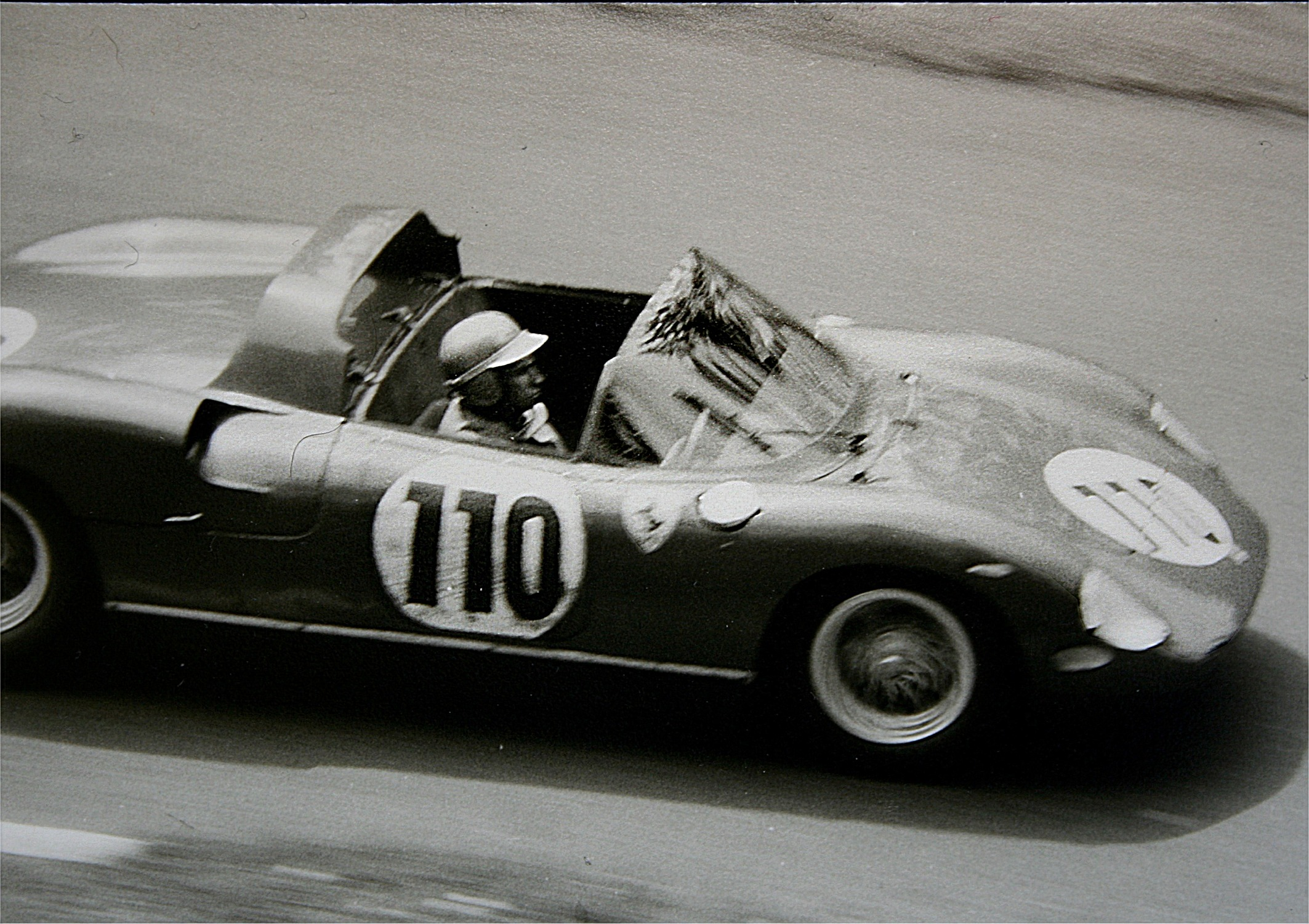
The Willy Mairesse / John Surtees Ferrari 250 P heading for victory at the 1963 1000 km Nürburgring

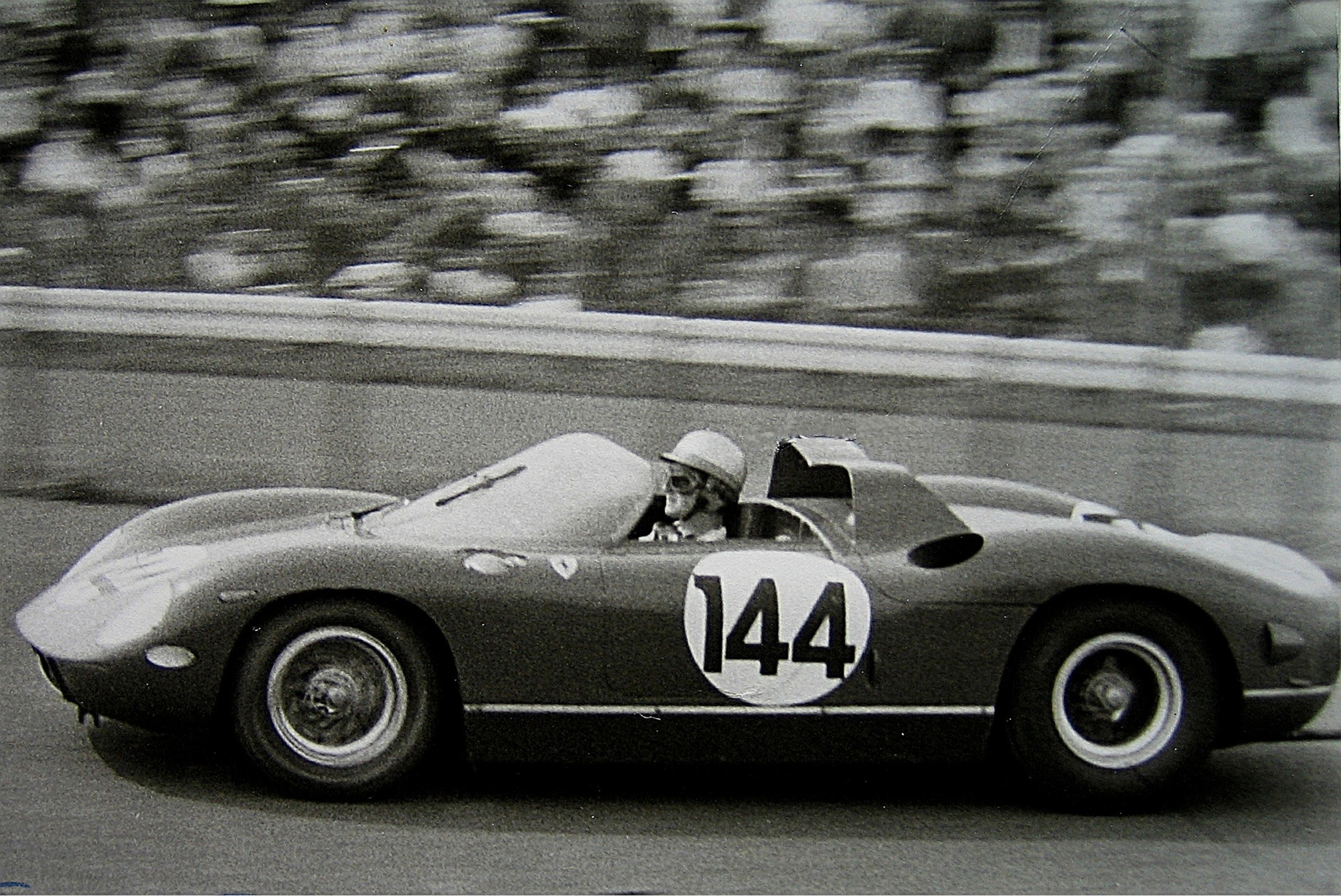
Ferrari 275 P driven by Ludovico Scarfiotti at the 1964 1000 km Nürburgring

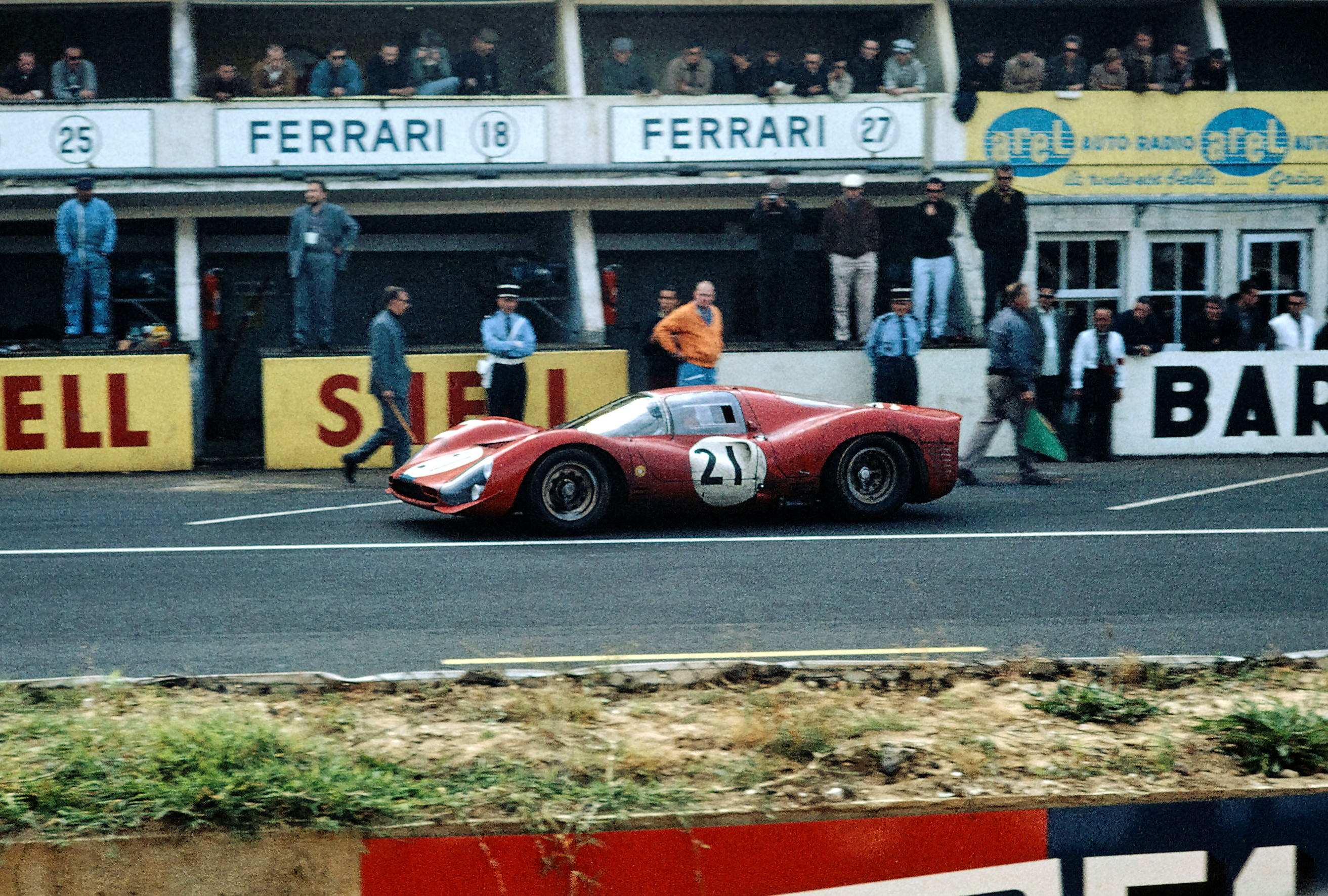
Ferrari 330 P3 at the 1966 24 Hours of Le Mans

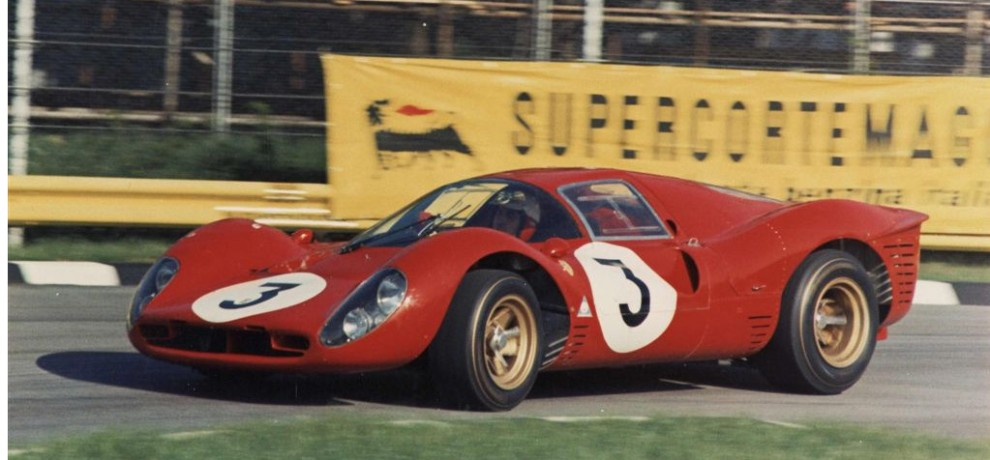
Ferrari 330 P4 s/n 0856 at 1000km Monza, 1967

In the first half of the 1960s, Ferrari continued to enjoy considerable success, including six overall wins in a row at the 24 Hours of Le Mans (from 1960 to 1965). With the introduction of the Sports Prototypes class, the team developed the Ferrari P series of cars. Up to the 1964 season, they faced little competition from major manufacturers, as only Porsche stayed in the series albeit with smaller engined cars that were able to be competitive only in selected races where engine power was less relevant and overall lightness was a premium, such as at the Targa Florio or at the Nurburgring. At the end of 1963, a conflict between Ferrari and Ford over the potential acquisition of the Italian manufacturer by the American giant carmaker gave way to the famous "Ford vs. Ferrari war", a sort of modern David vs. Goliath battle that changed international motorsport forever. Ford decided to enter endurance racing pouring unprecedented amounts of money in the development of a racing department in England with the objective to beat Ferrari in this category of races. The Ford GT40 was born and developed in the years following that initiative. After a few years, Ford entered also the Formula One championship. No European manufacturer was able to compete with this level of investment at the time, and Ford engines dominated Formula One racing for over a decade. Moreover, the advent of the American carmaker brought along munificent sponsorships from American tobacco and oil companies, in addition to a bigger level of media coverage to the sport. Ferrari was able to prevail in the 1964 and 1965 seasons both in the championship and at the 24 Hours of Le Mans but had to concede Ford the victory in the 1966 championship and Le Mans race, when the 7-litre GT40 had a dominant season.

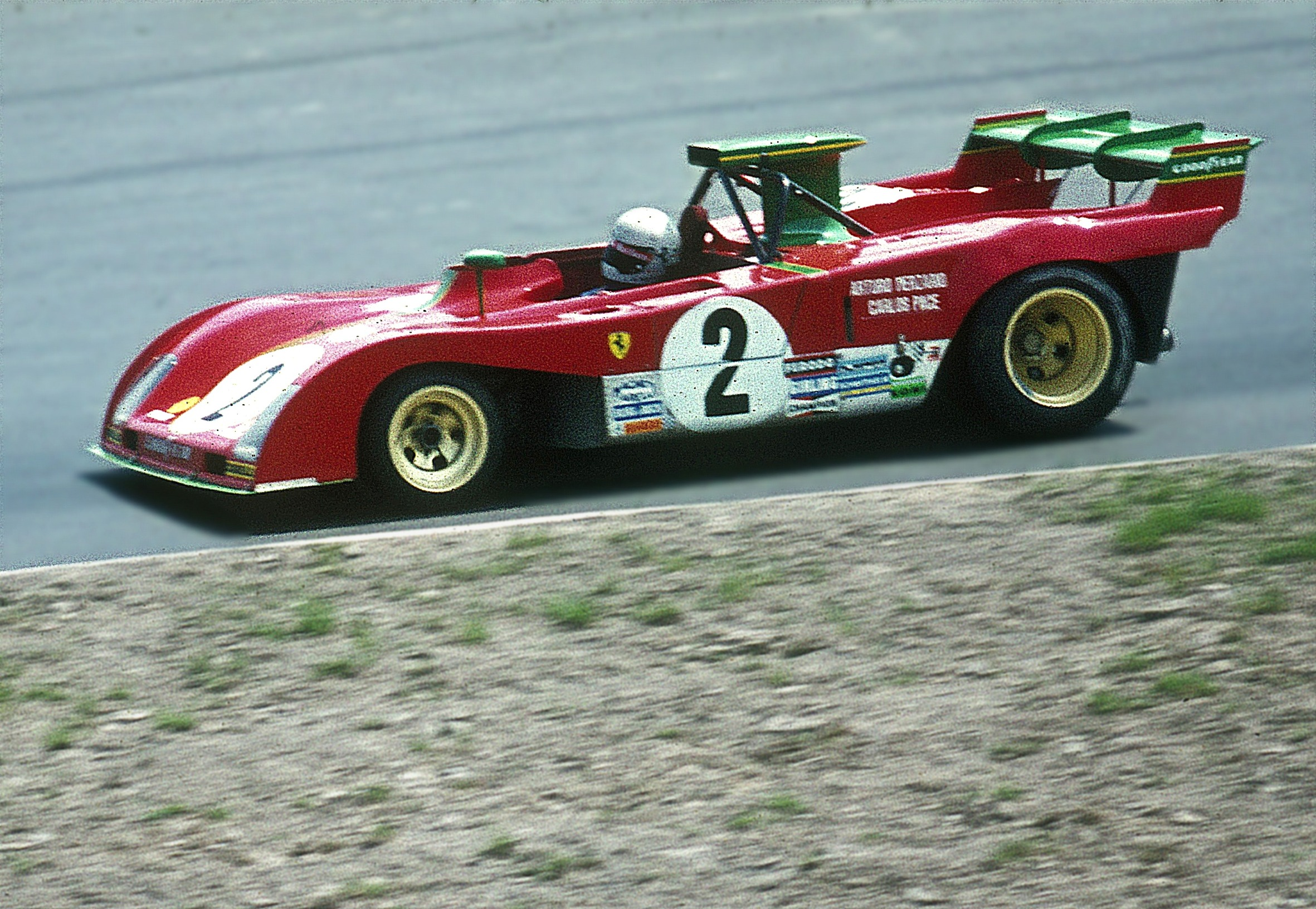
Ferrari 312 PB

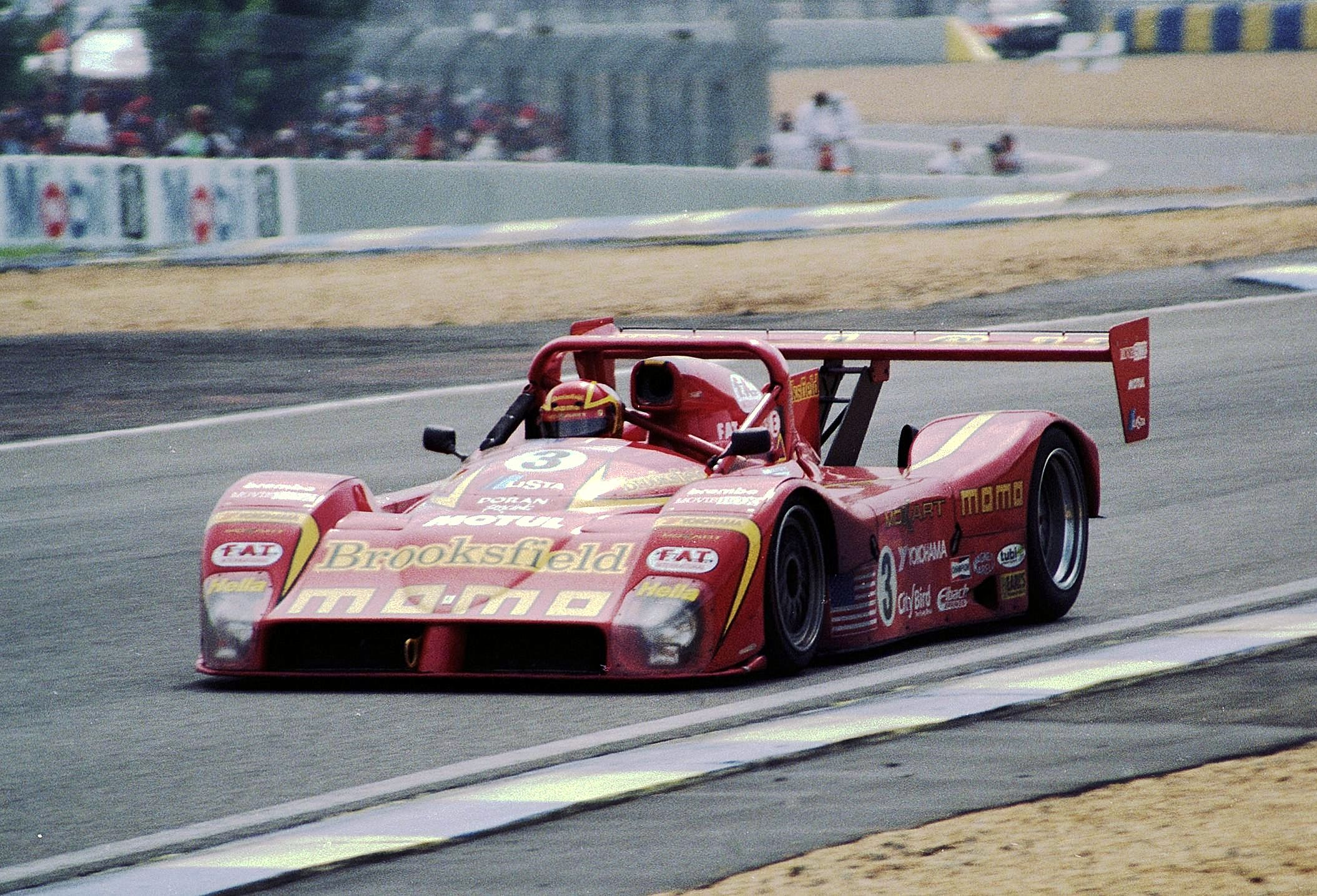
Ferrari 333 SP

In 1967, the last year in which Ford and Ferrari battled for the championship, saw Ferrari taking the championship but losing at the 24 Hours of Le Mans race. This race was very controversial as the race timing disappeared entirely for multiple hours during the night before reappearing with altered results. This and other controversial aspects of the race were recounted by the late Mauro Forghieri, famously quoting a dialogue with Mr Finance, then in charge of organising the Le Mans race. A change of rules denying the participation to prototype cars for the 1968 season forced Ferrari out from the championship and resulted in the end of the Ford vs Ferrari battle in endurance racing. The 1970s was the last decade Ferrari entered as a works effort in sports car racing. After an uninspired performance in the 1973 season, Enzo Ferrari stopped all development of sports cars in prototype and grand touring (GT) racing at the end of the year to concentrate on Formula One. This choice paid off and Ferrari was able to contend the Formula One title already from the 1974 season and then went on to win several titles in the following years. After Ferrari withdrawal from the WSC, the series soon saw a decline in the level of competition and reduced almost to a one-contender show until the 1987 season, when several manufacturers entered the championship again. Since the 1985 season, the championship was declassed to a team one and there was not a largely participated world manufacturer title for sportscars until the inception of the FIA World Endurance Championship (WEC). Ferrari cars were raced in a range of classes, such as GT racing by other entrants, but not by the factory Scuderia Ferrari team. In the 1990s, Ferrari returned to sports prototypes as a constructor with the Ferrari 333 SP with success, although Scuderia Ferrari itself never raced this car.

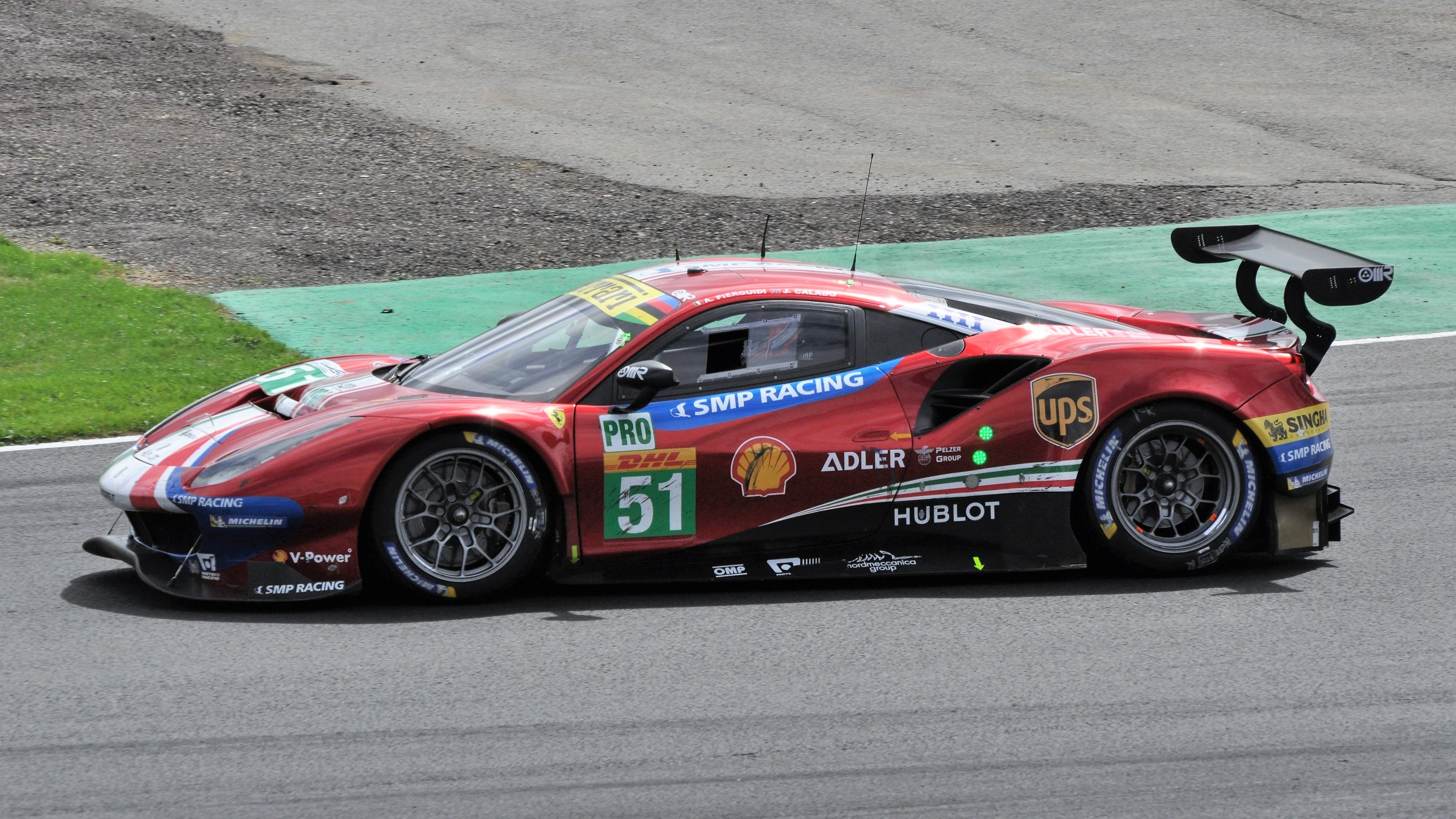
#51 AF Corse Ferrari 488 GTE, 2018 6 Hours of Silverstone

From 2006, Ferrari returned to GT car racing with a factory effort Ferrari Competizioni GT, in partnership with racing teams, such as AF Corse, Kessel Racing, and Risi Competizione, among others. With factory support, these teams achieved great success in major international GT2 and GTE Pro/GTLM competitions. Starting from this same year, AF Corse won the GT2 manufacturers' title along with the team's title each year it was contested in the FIA GT Championship. It also took two drivers' titles in 2006 and 2008 in the same series. Following the demise of the GT Championship and the creation of a new world championship series for endurance racing by the FIA, Ferrari/AF Corse continued to enjoy much success in GT racing. Of the ten GT manufacturers' championships contested from the introduction of the WEC championship in 2012, Ferrari won seven editions (2012, 2013, 2014, 2016, 2017, 2021, and 2022). Almost the same happened with the GT drivers' title, which had been awarded since the 2013 season, with Ferrari/AF Corse winning five out of nine editions (2013, 2014, 2017, 2021, and 2022). To this tally, AF Corse added four out of six LMGTE PRO team trophies. Several other trophies were won also in the LMGTE PRO/AM class in the WEC. Other victories were also achieved in international and national championships both in GT2/LmGTE and GT3 classes all over the world. Among the victories in prestigious racing events are the two GT2 class wins scored at the 24 Hours of Le Mans in 2008 and 2009 by Risi Competizione and the four GTE Pro class wins scored by AF Corse at the same event: in 2012 and 2014 with the Ferrari 458 GT2 driven by Gianmaria Bruni, Giancarlo Fisichella, and Toni Vilander; in 2019 with the Ferrari 488 GTE Ferrari 488 GTE driven by Alessandro Pier Guidi, James Calado, and Daniel Serra; and in 2021 with the same car driven by Pier Guidi, Calado, and Côme Ledogar. A Ferrari 488 GT3 scored the overall win at the 2017 12 Hours of Bathurst and the 2021 24 Hours of Spa.

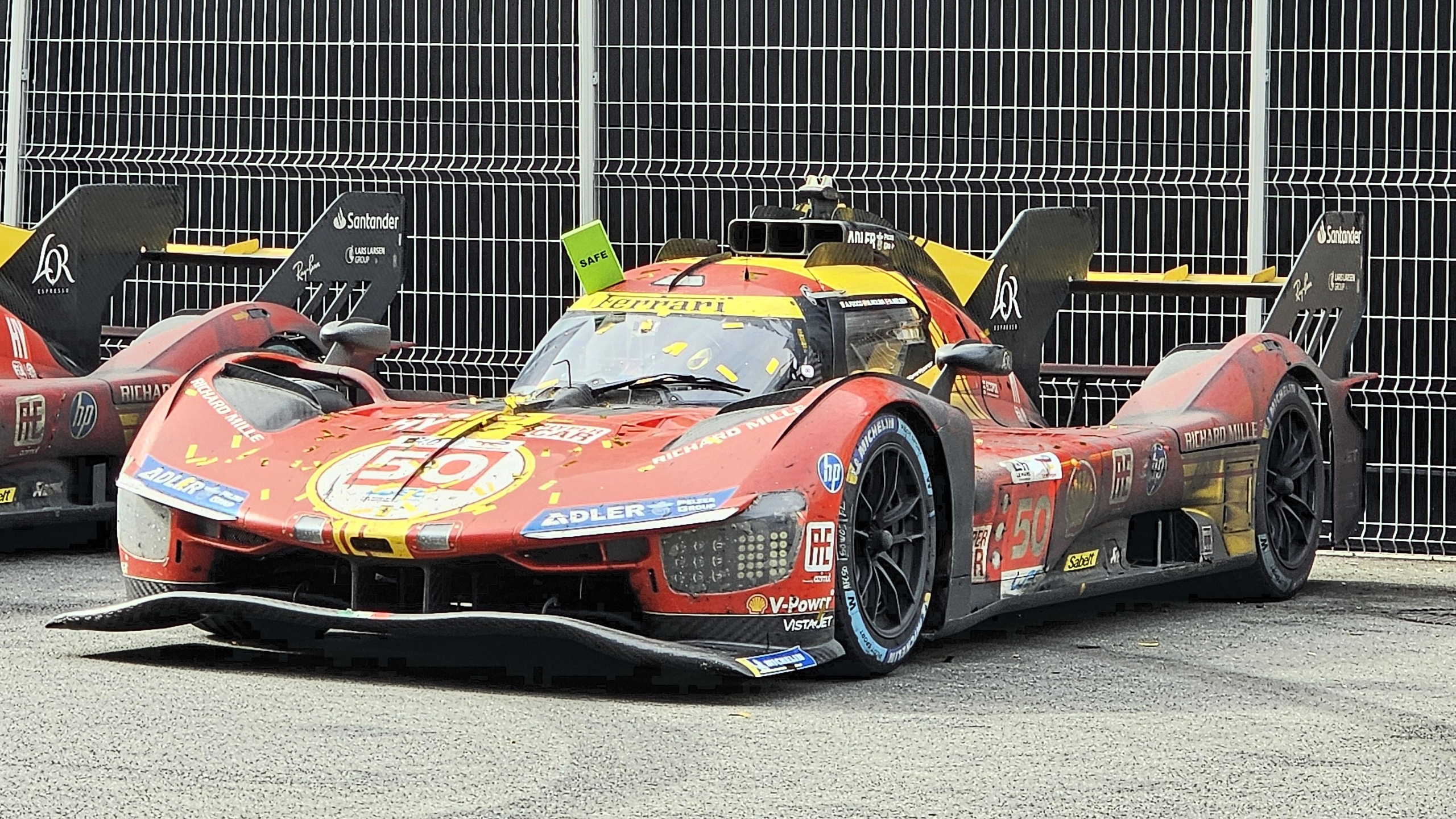
The race-winning No. 50 Ferrari 499P after the 2024 24 Hours of Le Mans parked next to its No. 51 sister car

In 2023, after a 50-year hiatus, Ferrari returned to the top class of endurance racing with its new Ferrari 499P, a Le Mans Hypercar prototype. Subsequently, they were able to compete for the world title and in prestigious events, such as the 24 Hours of Le Mans, the 24 Hours of Daytona, and the 12 Hours of Sebring. The 499P was managed by AF Corse and this caused a restructuring of the GT activities of the successful Italian team. At the 2023 24 Hours of Le Mans, Ferrari achieved its first Le Mans victory since 1965 with the No. 51 499P driven by Alessandro Pier Guidi, James Calado, and Antonio Giovinazzi. In the same year, a Ferrari 296 GT3 run by Frikadelli Racing won the 24 Hours of Nürburgring. At the 2024 24 Hours of Le Mans, Ferrari achieved its eleventh victory, recording consecutive victories at Le Mans for the first time since 1965 with the No. 50 499P driven by Antonio Fuoco, Miguel Molina and Nicklas Nielsen, while the Ferrari No. 51 499P driven by Alessandro Pier Guidi, James Calado, and Antonio Giovinazzi, winner of the previous edition, came in third place. The success was repeated in 2025, with the No. 83 499P driven by Phil Hanson, Robert Kubica and Yifei Ye winning Ferrari's twelfth 24h of Le Mans. Ferrari went on to win the 2025 World Manufacturers' and Drivers' Championships.

== Personnel and statistics ==
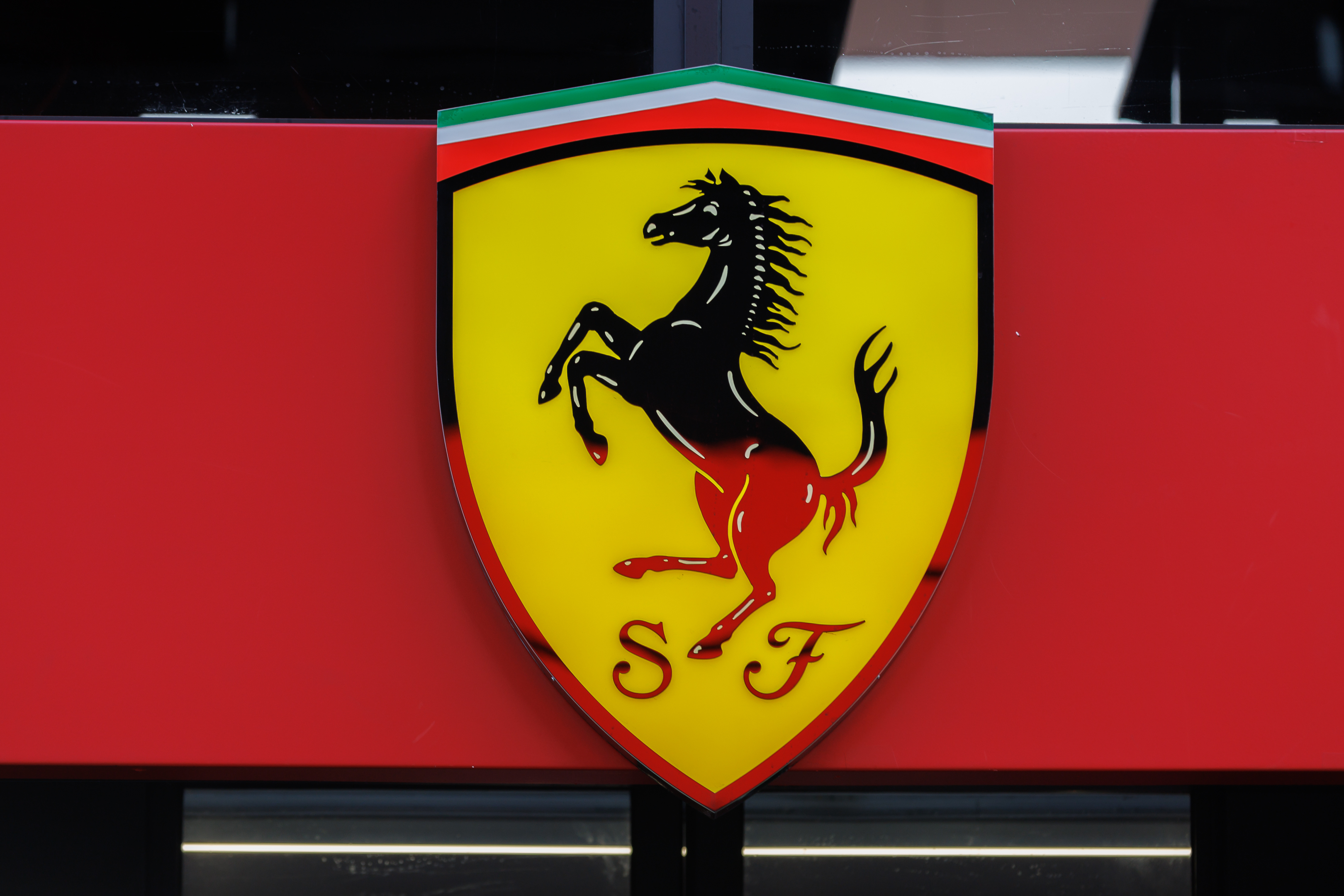
Ferrari have won a record 16 World Constructors' Championship titles.

=== Formula One results ===
As a constructor, Ferrari has achieved the following statistics:

- Constructors' Championship winning percentage: 23.2%
- Drivers' Championship winning percentage: 19.5%
- Winning percentage: 21.9%

=== Formula One records ===
Ferrari has achieved unparalleled success in Formula One and holds many significant records as both a constructor and an engine manufacturer (all numbers are based on World Championship events only). Ferrari is the most successful Formula One engine manufacturer with 251 wins, having achieved a single non-Ferrari victory with Scuderia Toro Rosso at the 2008 Italian Grand Prix, as well as one Ferrari privateer win at the 1961 French Grand Prix.

Record	As a team	As a constructor
Most Constructors' Championships	16	16
Most Drivers' Championships	15	15
Most Grands Prix participated	1144	1144
Most Grands Prix started	1141	1142
Most wins	249	250
Most podium finishes	844 (in 648 races) (Note: Does not include Gilles Villeneuve's third-place finish at the 1982 United States Grand Prix West from which he, despite having participated in a podium ceremony, was eventually disqualified.)	849 (in 651 races) (Note: Includes NART entries. Includes five podium finishes achieved in privately entered Ferraris.)
Most 1–2 finishes	86 (Note: Does not include the 1952 Swiss Grand Prix, where a team-entered Ferrari finished first, and a privately entered Ferrari finished second.)	87 (Note: Includes the 1952 Swiss Grand Prix, where a team-entered Ferrari finished first, and a privately entered Ferrari finished second.)
Most pole positions	255	255
Most fastest laps	270	271
Most laps led	16235 (Note: Does not include Giancarlo Baghetti's 7 laps in the lead at the 1961 French Grand Prix in a privately entered Ferrari.)	16242 (Note: Includes Giancarlo Baghetti's 7 laps in the lead at the 1961 French Grand Prix in a privately entered Ferrari.)
Most Constructors' Championship points		11232
Most Drivers' Championship points		12133.77

=== Drivers' Champions ===
Nine drivers have won the Drivers' Championship while driving for Ferrari, winning a total of fifteen Drivers' Championships.

Driver	Nationality	Place of birth	Championships with Ferrari
Alberto Ascari	Italy	Milan, Italy	2 (1952, 1953)
Juan Manuel Fangio	Argentina	Balcarce, Buenos Aires, Argentina	1 (1956)
Mike Hawthorn	United Kingdom	Doncaster, Yorkshire, England	1 (1958)
Phil Hill	United States	Miami, Florida, U.S.	1 (1961)
John Surtees	United Kingdom	Tatsfield, England	1 (1964)
Niki Lauda	Austria	Vienna, Austria	2 (1975, 1977)
Jody Scheckter	South Africa	East London, Eastern Cape, South Africa	1 (1979)
Michael Schumacher	Germany	Hürth, North Rhine-Westphalia, Germany	5 (2000, 2001, 2002, 2003, 2004)
Kimi Räikkönen	Finland	Espoo, Finland	1 (2007)

=== Team principals / sporting directors ===
- (Italy) Federico Giberti (1950–1951)
- (Italy) Nello Ugolini (1952–1955)
- (Italy) Eraldo Sculati (1956)
- (Italy) Mino Amorotti (1957)
- (Italy) Romolo Tavoni (1958–1961)
- (Italy) Eugenio Dragoni (1962–1966)
- (Italy) Franco Lini (1967)
- (Italy) Franco Gozzi (1968–1970)
- (Switzerland) Peter Schetty (1971–1972)
- (Italy) Alessandro Colombo (1973)
- (Italy) Luca Cordero di Montezemolo (1974–1975)
- (Italy) Daniele Audetto (1976)
- (Italy) Roberto Nosetto (1977)
- (Monaco) Marco Piccinini (1978–1988)
- (Italy) Cesare Fiorio (1989–1991)
- (Italy) Claudio Lombardi (1991)
- (Italy) Sante Ghedini (1992–1993)
- (France) Jean Todt (1993–2007)
- (Italy) Stefano Domenicali (2008–2014)
- (Italy) Marco Mattiacci (2014)
- (Italy) Maurizio Arrivabene (2015–2018)
- (Italy) Mattia Binotto (2019–2022)
- (France) Fred Vasseur (since 2023)

=== Privateer entries ===
Between 1950 and 1966, numerous privateer teams entered Ferrari cars in World Championship events. Between them, these teams achieved five podium finishes, including Giancarlo Baghetti's win at the 1961 French Grand Prix, and one fastest lap (Baghetti at the 1961 Italian Grand Prix). The 1966 Italian Grand Prix was the last time a Ferrari car was entered by a privateer team when Giancarlo Baghetti drove a private Ferrari car entered by the British Reg Parnell team.

=== Ferrari-supplied Formula One engine results ===
Constructor	Season(s)	Win(s)	Pole position(s)	Fastest lap(s)	First win	Last win
(Italy) Ferrari	1950–present	250	255	271	1951 British Grand Prix	2026 British Grand Prix
(United States) Kurtis Kraft	1956	0	0	0	—	—
(United Kingdom) Cooper	1960, 1966	0	0	0	—	—
(Italy) De Tomaso	1963	0	0	0	—	—
(Italy) Minardi	1991	0	0	0	—	—
(Italy) Scuderia Italia	1992–1993	0	0	0	—	—
(United Kingdom) Red Bull Racing	2006	0	0	0	—	—
(Netherlands) Spyker	2007	0	0	0	—	—
(Italy) Toro Rosso	2007–2013, 2016	1	1	1	2008 Italian Grand Prix	2008 Italian Grand Prix
Force India	2008	0	0	0	—	—
(Switzerland) Sauber	2010–2018, 2024–2025	0	0	3	—	—
(Russia) Marussia	2014–2015	0	0	0	—	—
(United States) Haas	2016–present	0	1	3	—	—
(Switzerland) Alfa Romeo	2019–2023	0	0	2	—	—
(United States) Cadillac	2026–present	0	0	0	—	—
Total	1950–present	251	257	280		

=== Esports ===
==== Esports Drivers' Champions ====
The following drivers won the Formula One Esports Drivers' Championship for Scuderia Ferrari Esports Team:

- (Italy) David Tonizza (2019).

== See also ==
- List of Ferrari engines
- List of Ferrari road cars
- Museo Ferrari

== Explanatory notes ==
Achievements
Preceded by Cooper	Formula One Constructors' Champion; 1961	Succeeded by BRM
Preceded by Lotus	Formula One Constructors' Champion; 1964	Succeeded by Lotus
Preceded by McLaren	Formula One Constructors' Champion; 1975–1976–1977	Succeeded by Lotus
Preceded by Lotus	Formula One Constructors' Champion; 1979	Succeeded by Williams
Preceded by Williams	Formula One Constructors' Champion; 1982–1983	Succeeded by McLaren
Preceded by McLaren	Formula One Constructors' Champion; 1999–2000–2001–2002–2003–2004	Succeeded by Renault
Preceded by Renault	Formula One Constructors' Champion; 2007–2008	Succeeded by Brawn
Awards
Preceded by Max Verstappen	Lorenzo Bandini Trophy; 2017	Succeeded by Valtteri Bottas
