= Ferrari 637 =

Ferrari Indycar racing car

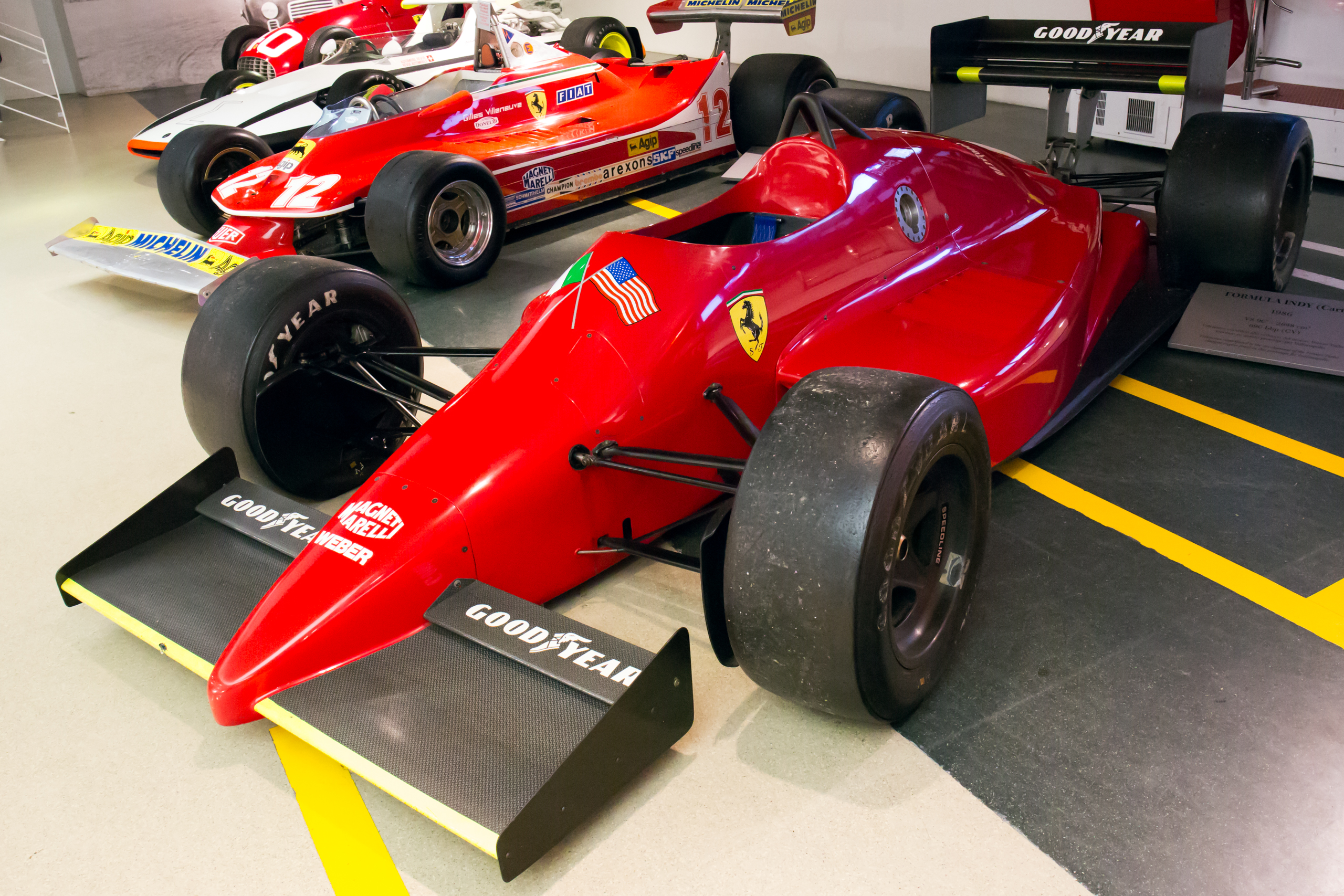
- Category: IndyCar
- Constructor: Ferrari
- Designer: Gustav Brunner

Technical specifications
- Chassis: Blend of moulded aluminium and composite carbon
- Length: 4,420 mm (174 in)
- Width: 1,990 mm (78 in)
- Axle track: 1,708 mm (67 in) (front); 1,610 mm (63 in) (rear)
- Wheelbase: 2,812 mm (111 in)
- Engine: Ferrari 034 2.65 L (162 cu in) 90° V8 Single turbocharger Longitudinal mid/rear
- Transmission: Emco six-speed sequential manual transmission
- Power: 690–710 hp (515–529 kW) at 11,500–12,000 rpm
- Fuel: Methanol (Agip oil)
- Tyres: Goodyear

Competition history
- Notable entrants: Truesports
- Notable drivers: (Italy) Michele Alboreto
- Debut: n/a
Races	Wins	Poles	F/Laps
0	0	0	0

The Ferrari 637 is a Ferrari racing car developed to run in the American CART series. It was designed by Gustav Brunner. Although unveiled to the press in 1986, it never raced.

== Background ==
Unhappy with the impending engine regulations in Formula One which stipulated that the engine must be a V8 configuration, Enzo Ferrari commissioned the design of an Indy car. While he made no secret of his desire to win the Indianapolis 500, many believe that his threat to leave F1 for CART was merely a bargaining tool to make the FIA rethink their engine regulations. Ferrari approached Goodyear about the possible CART program, and Goodyear recommended the Truesports CART team for a research and development partnership.

After the 1985 CART season, Truesports and driver Bobby Rahal traveled to Italy to demonstrate a March 85C-Cosworth. The car was tested by both Rahal and Ferrari driver Michele Alboreto at the Fiorano test track. Afterwards, the car was taken apart and studied by Ferrari. In 1986, Ferrari designed and built their own car, which was tested by Alboreto.

Ultimately, this car was never raced as a Ferrari, but was passed on to fellow FIAT subsidiary Alfa Romeo, who were looking to improve their market share in the US.

== Technical ==
For a car that was supposedly only a bargaining tool, the 637 was well engineered and carefully thought out. The upper body was made of aluminium, mechanically bonded and glued to the lower carbon fibre frame. The Type 034 engine is a turbocharged 32-valve, 90° 2.65-litre V8, as per CART regulations, which used upward mounted exhausts.

When Alfa Romeo unveiled their unrelated 2.65-litre IndyCar engine, it was in the back of a March chassis; however it was seen testing at Fiorano Circuit in the 637 chassis.

== See also ==
- Lotus 96T
- Alfa Romeo's IndyCar project
- Porsche's IndyCar activities
