= BRM Type 15 =

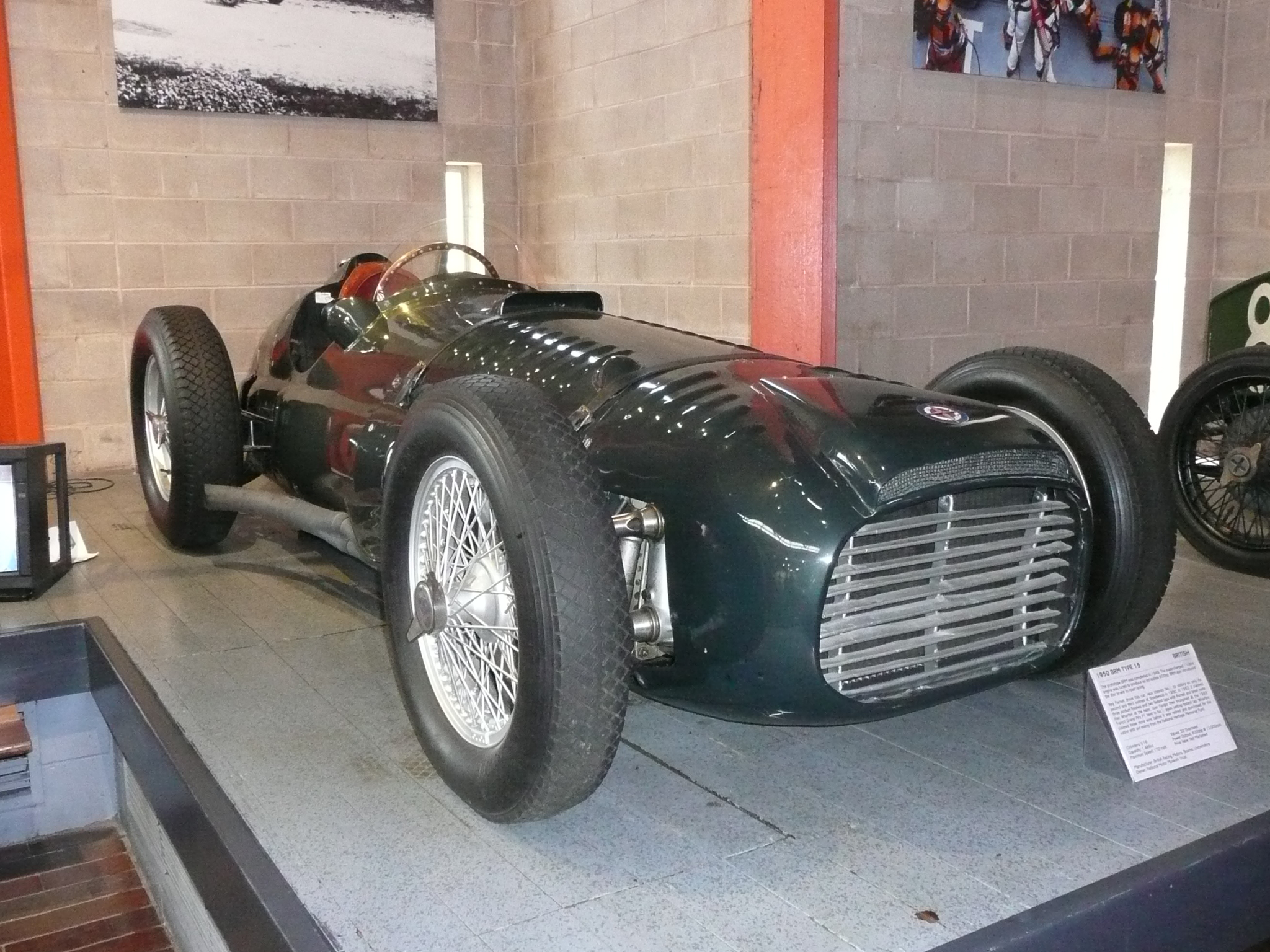
- Category: Formula One; Formule Libre
- Constructor: British Racing Motors
- Designer: Peter Berthon
- Successor: BRM P25

Technical specifications
- Chassis: Steel box-section ladder.
- Suspension (front): Porsche-type trailing arms, with Lockheed oleo struts.
- Suspension (rear): de Dion tube, with Lockheed air struts.
- Axle track: F: 52 in (132.1 cm); R: 51 in (129.5 cm)
- Wheelbase: 104 in (264.2 cm)
- Engine: British Racing Motors V16 1,496 cc (91.3 cu in) V16 supercharged, front-mounted.
- Transmission: BRM 5-speed, transverse shaft. ZF differential.
- Weight: 1,624 lb (736.6 kg) (Unladen)
- Fuel: Petrol/alcohol mix.
- Tyres: Dunlop.

Competition history
- Notable entrants: BRM Ltd. Owen Racing Organisation
- Notable drivers: (United Kingdom) Reg Parnell (Argentina) Juan Manuel Fangio (Argentina) José Froilán González (United Kingdom) Ken Wharton (United Kingdom) Stirling Moss (United Kingdom) Peter Collins
- Debut: 1950 BRDC International Trophy
Races	Wins	Poles	F/Laps
2	0	0	0
- Unless otherwise stated, all data refer to Formula One World Championship Grands Prix only.

The BRM Type 15 was a Formula One racing car of the early 1950s, and the first car produced by British Racing Motors. The car was fitted with a revolutionary and highly complex supercharged 1.5-litre British Racing Motors V16 which produced considerably more power than any of its contemporaries.

The distinctive noise of the car made it a favourite with crowds wherever it appeared, but the initial unreliability of the car, its inability to live up to the hype that the project's leading figures had created around it, and the change to Formula Two regulations in 1952 meant the project never achieved the hoped-for level of success on the Grand Prix stage; the car's complexities meant it had a longer development time than its competitors and was not properly competitive until 1953 (3 years after it first raced), where it saw success at non-championship events.

== Background ==
After the end of the Second World War motor racing slowly returned, based on whatever machinery could be found, largely consisting of the pre-war Voiturette cars conforming to a formula of supercharged 1.5-litre engines. One of the more successful voiturette constructors of the late 1930s had been English Racing Automobiles, founded by Raymond Mays and others. Mays was a very patriotic British driver with an enviable reputation, but despite considerable success in lesser races he had been given little opportunity to race in Grands Prix, since there were very few significant British attempts to build suitable cars to challenge the dominant Italian and later German cars. In early 1939, ERA's wealthy backer Humphrey Cook withdrew his funding, and Mays along with talented and imaginative ERA engineer Peter Berthon founded Automobile Developments Ltd, a project to build a fully-fledged British Grand Prix car along the lines of Mercedes-Benz and Auto Union. Throughout the war, the idea gestated in the two men's minds, with Berthon latching on to the idea of a supercharged 135° V16 engine as had been proposed to power the British Union Grand Prix car. With the end of the war in sight, Mays began to look for backers within British industry for his project.

== Design ==
Designers Berthon and Eric Richter were expecting 500 bhp and at least 12,000rpm from their new British Racing Motors V16 engine, which was a 1.5-litre 135° V16 designed to meet the 1947 "Formula A" or "Formula 1" regulations that would go on to become the formula for the Drivers' World Championship in 1950. A V8 configuration had also been considered but it has been suggested that the V16 was chosen in part to bolster the car's image when approaching potential sponsors.

After Germany fell, Mays had access to several of the Mercedes and Auto Union designs, as well as other relevant German wartime technology. This showed in the design of the chassis, with Auto Union derived trailing arm suspension at the front and Mercedes inspired de Dion radius arms at the rear. This arrangement did little for the car's road-holding, although few cars of the period handled particularly well. However the car used Lockheed oleo-pneumatic struts in place of the conventional coil spring and damper units, it being thought at the time that this aviation-derived system would become a common road car arrangement.

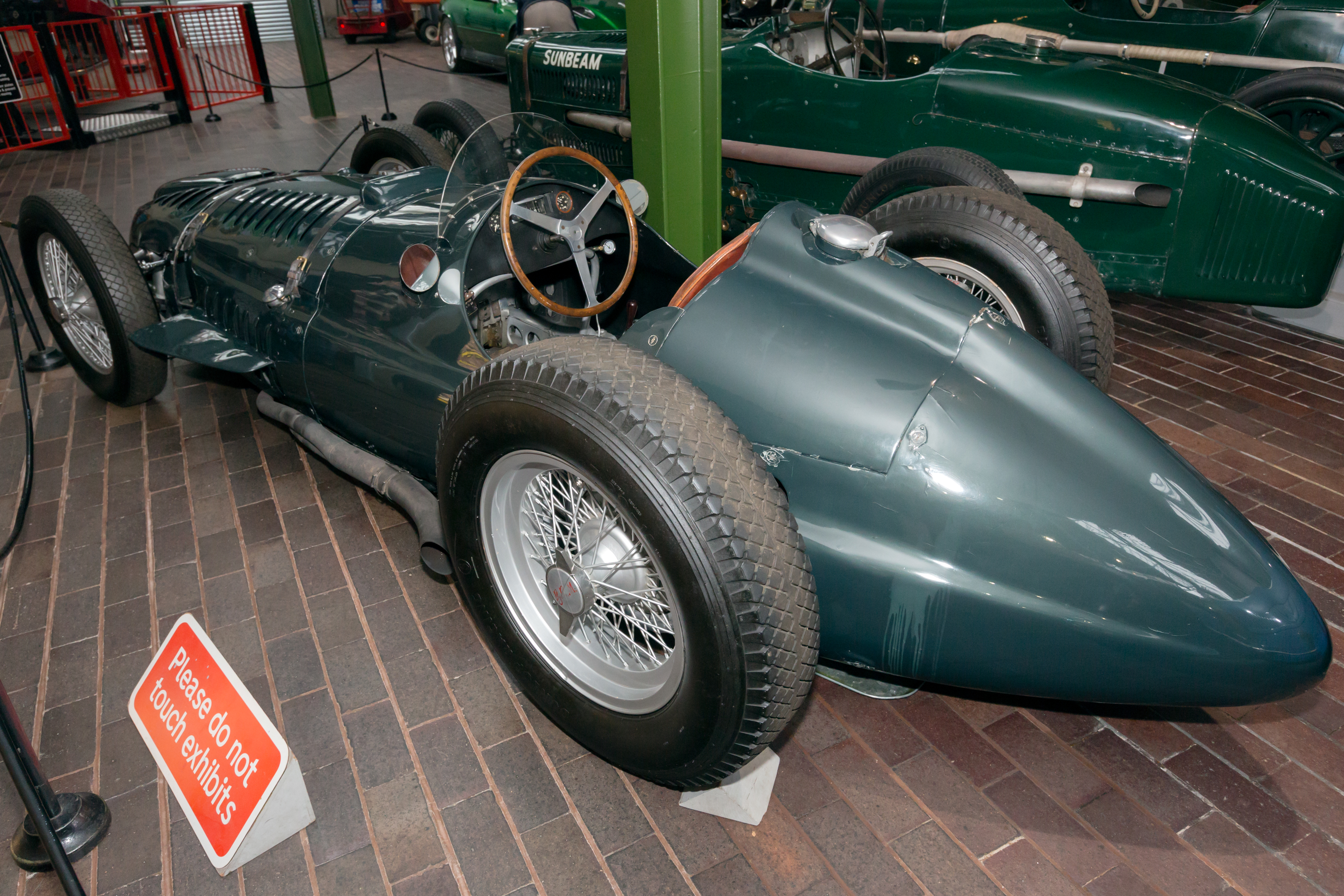
BRM Type 15 rear view

Another significant departure from previous designs was the use of twin centrifugal rather than Roots-type superchargers, developed by Rolls-Royce based on the units used on later versions of the Merlin aero engine. This was to prove one of the car's main shortcomings. While it allowed for tremendous power at high revs, the engine produced significantly less power lower down the rev range. This meant drivers were constantly struggling to keep the revs within a very small power band.

The chassis itself was not particularly advanced, essentially a ladder chassis with pairs of tubes running down either flank of the car each linked with welded sheet metal, with cross members running across the car between the two. Much attention was paid to keeping the centre of gravity low, and the Type 15 has a significantly lower profile compared with other Formula One cars of the time. Steering was by recirculating ball and nut, and continued to be so despite calls from Stirling Moss in particular to switch to a rack and pinion system to increase responsiveness. Initially the car had drum brakes developed by Girling with three shoes per corner, but in late 1951 the team began to fit disc brakes, a first for a Formula One car.

== The project takes shape ==
Mays set about persuading British engineering businesses of the merits of being associated with the project. His main thrust was that it was a matter of British prestige for the country to finally build a World-beating Grand Prix car. With the country still awash with post-war patriotism more than three hundred companies including Lucas, Girling, Rolls-Royce, Vandervell, Rubery Owen, David Brown and Standard Motors enthusiastically backed the project either with cash or help in kind in the form of parts, staff secondments, access to testing equipment and technical information. On 25 April 1947 the British Motor Racing Research Trust was formed with the engine already under development.

The large number of companies involved in the project led to an organisational nightmare which, combined with continued rationing, the difficult financial conditions of post-war Britain and the low priority of work on the project within companies that had agreed to help, meant that the first car was not ready to start running until December 1949. Mays wanted to keep the car under wraps while development continued but was overruled, and after the Type 15 was revealed for the first time a major public relations operation was mounted, with articles in the press (including a very supportive leading article in The Times), features in boys' magazines, pamphlets and even a book titled "BRM Ambassador for Britain: The Story of Britain's Greatest Racing Car". The car ended up costing an astonishing £200,000 (£8,037,000 in 2023, or US$10 million)- at least 20 times more expensive than any other car of the time. A Pathé newsreel of the car's unveiling confidently declared:

"Seldom has so much money been better spent... In the BRM Britain has found a winner!"

== Racing at last ==
With all the delays the team found themselves well behind as the new World Championship began at the British Grand Prix in May. Not being in a position to enter the race itself, Mays gave the car a demonstration run in front of the very large Silverstone crowd and donations from the public flooded in. A second car was completed later in 1950 and the team set the International Trophy as the car's first full race meeting, in part due to pressure from the team's backers and also the Daily Express who in addition to sponsoring the event had prepared a brochure about the car which was to be distributed amongst the spectators.

The much anticipated début by the new machines could not have gone much worse. Of the two cars, only Raymond Sommer's car was fit to start at the back of the qualifying race after the car had been flown down overnight, and at the start the car lurched forward only a few inches before being stranded by a drive shaft failure, putting it out of both that race and the final. Loud boos rang out from the crowd and as the car was wheeled away some even mockingly threw pennies at the car.

The car's second race meeting at Goodwood a month later was considerably more encouraging despite very wet conditions, with Reg Parnell winning not only the minor Woodcote Cup but also the full Formula One Goodwood Trophy later that same day. "All we need now is a little longer time to develop it and then we hope to show the continent what we really can do" said Parnell after the race, but in truth the cold conditions had masked overheating problems that would later come back to haunt the team. The final outing for 1950 came with a two car entry at the Penya Rhin Grand Prix, but after qualifying fourth and fifth Parnell was out early when his supercharger's drive shaft snapped before Peter Walker retired at two-thirds distance because of an oil leak in his gearbox.

=== 1951 ===
For 1951 two new cars were built with improvements to the brakes, steering and fuel tanks, and were entered into the team's first full Championship Grand Prix at Silverstone. Problems with the cars prevented them from setting qualifying times, but both cars were ready to start from the back of the grid. The exhausts of the cars had been designed to run within the bodywork, but this was the first race the cars had run to a full Grand Prix length and the drivers found themselves dealing with almost unbearable heat within the cockpit, to the point that they had to have burns dressings applied during pitstops to act as insulation and protect their arms from the hot exhaust piping. With the thought of all the effort that had gone into the project Parnell and Walker steeled themselves to struggle on to the finish and came home in fifth and seventh, albeit several laps down on the winning Ferrari of José Froilán González.

The car's next race was deep within "enemy territory", at Monza for the Italian Grand Prix. BRM turned up with two cars and a very impressive transporter. Parnell was now partnered by BRM mechanic and test driver Ken Richardson. In practice the pair were unable to run their cars to the full but set the eighth and tenth fastest times, but then Richardson's entry was cancelled on the grounds that he had insufficient racing experience. Mays turned down the organisers' requests that he step in, but 50-year-old Hans Stuck agreed to drive and did a few practice laps. However an inspection of the gearboxes showed they were not too far from seizure, and both cars were withdrawn before the race on safety grounds.

There were to be no further races in 1951. A car entered for Parnell in the Goodwood Trophy failed to arrive. Parnell still managed to finish second in a Ferrari entered by Tony Vandervell, who by now had grown tired of the BRM project and left to conquer Formula One in his own way, becoming a bitter rival to the BRMs.

== Change of regulations 1952 ==
At the start of 1952 Alfa Romeo announced the withdrawal of their Alfettas from the World Championship, and with 1951 Champion Juan Manuel Fangio now a free agent Mays saw an opportunity to sign him up for BRM. Mays invited Fangio to test the car at Folkingham, and in an all-out effort to curry favour with the busy driver he decided that having a working car on hand for testing at a time convenient for Fangio was more important than entering April's Gran Premio del Valentino in Turin, and with financial problems also weighing on Mays' mind BRM withdrew their three entries from the race.

It turned out to be an error for BRM. With not only no Alfa Romeos but now no BRMs to challenge them either, Ferraris romped home in 1st, 2nd, 3rd and 5th, with Peter Whitehead's Thinwall Special Ferrari in 4th. Faced with the prospect of a season dominated by just a single serious Formula One team, the FIA bowed to pressure from race organisers and decreed that the World Championship Grands Prix would be run to Formula Two regulations, for which the Type 15 was not admissible. As it turned out Ferrari won every championship Grand Prix that year anyway, but with no car eligible for the World Championship BRM had to content themselves with various non-championship Formula one, Formula Libre and minor British races.

== Non-championship career ==
Fangio and fellow Argentine González both started on the front row in the BRMs at the Albi GP but after running one and two both suffered overheating problems that put them out. For the Ulster Trophy Moss partnered Fangio, but clutch issues did for Moss at the start and Fangio had to retire with a blocked oil filter.

The next day Fangio's season was terminated by a serious crash in Italy, so Ken Wharton lined up at the Formula Libre race that supported the British Grand Prix with González, who set fastest time in practise but slid off and damaged a radiator while running second in the race. He took over Wharton's car but had to retire from third when his gearbox failed with only three laps left. Neither car managed to finish the International Trophy either, but Reg Parnell did manage to win an FL race in Scotland. BRM entered three cars in each of the races at Goodwood, with first and third closely followed by a one-two-three in two races, another second place following in the car's last race of the year at Charterhall.

By now though many of BRM's backers had already had enough and decided to sell the team to Alfred Owen. Stirling Moss later spoke of the Type 15 and did not have warm feelings of the experience of racing it; he called the car "without doubt the worst car I ever raced - it was a disgrace."

With the new team in place for 1953, the Type 15 finally started to produce some consistent results. The Type 15, needing a longer development time due to its complexity had finally started to reach its peak development point. At the Easter Goodwood races Wharton was second in the first race ahead of Parnell in fourth, with Wharton winning the second race. He also finished third at Charterhall. At Albi the Type 15 struggled with tyres throwing their treads but managed first, second and fifth in the heat, with González second in the final as the other two cars dropped out. At Silverstone for the Grand Prix meeting Fangio came second with Wharton third. Wharton then won three races in succession at Snetterton and Charterhall, and after three podium places in two races for the team at Goodwood Wharton won the last race of the year at Castle Combe.

== Complete Formula One World Championship results ==
The table below details the complete World Championship Grand Prix results for the BRM Formula One team.

(key)

Year	Entrants	Engines	Tyres	Drivers	1	2	3	4	5	6	7	8
1951	BRM Ltd	BRM P15 1.5 V16s	D		SUI	500	BEL	FRA	GBR	GER	ITA	ESP
1951	BRM Ltd	BRM P15 1.5 V16s	D	Prince Bira	DNA			DNA				
1951	BRM Ltd	BRM P15 1.5 V16s	D	Reg Parnell	DNA				5		DNS	
1951	BRM Ltd	BRM P15 1.5 V16s	D	Peter Walker					7			
1951	BRM Ltd	BRM P15 1.5 V16s	D	Ken Richardson							DNS	
1951	BRM Ltd	BRM P15 1.5 V16s	D	Hans Stuck							DNS	DNA

== Non-Championship results ==
(key)

Year	Entrant	Engine	Tyres	Drivers	1	2	3	4	5	6	7	8	9	10	11	12	13	14	15	16	17	18	19	20	21	22	23	24	25	26	27	28	29	30	31	32	33	34	35
1950	BRM Ltd	BRM P15 1.5 V16s	D		PAU	RIC	SRM	EMP	BAR	JER	ALB	NED	NAT	NOT	ULS	PES	STT	INT	GOO	PEN																			
1950	BRM Ltd	BRM P15 1.5 V16s	D	Raymond Mays														DNA																					
1950	BRM Ltd	BRM P15 1.5 V16s	D	Raymond Sommer														DNS																					
1950	BRM Ltd	BRM P15 1.5 V16s	D	Reg Parnell															1	Ret																			
1950	BRM Ltd	BRM P15 1.5 V16s	D	Peter Walker																Ret																			
1951	BRM Ltd	BRM P15 1.5 V16s	D		SYR	PAU	RIC	SRM	BOR	INT	PAR	ULS	SCO	NED	ALB	PES	BAR	GOO																					
1951	BRM Ltd	BRM P15 1.5 V16s	D	Reg Parnell									DNA					DNA																					
1952	BRM Ltd	BRM P15 1.5 V16s	D		RIO	SYR	VAL	RIC	LAV	PAU	IBS	MAR	AST	INT	ELÄ	NAP	EIF	PAR	ALB	FRO	ULS	MNZ	LAC	ESS	MAR	SAB	CAE	DMT	COM	NAT	BAU	MOD	CAD	SKA	MAD	AVU	JOE	NEW	RIO
1952	BRM Ltd	BRM P15 1.5 V16s	D	Juan Manuel Fangio			DNA												Ret		Ret																		
1952	BRM Ltd	BRM P15 1.5 V16s	D	Stirling Moss			DNA														Ret																		
1952	BRM Ltd	BRM P15 1.5 V16s	D	Ken Wharton			DNA																					16											
1952	BRM Ltd	BRM P15 1.5 V16s	D	Jose Froilan Gonzalez															Ret									Ret											
1953	BRM Ltd	BRM P15 1.5 V16s	D		SYR	PAU	LAV	AST	BOR	INT	ELÄ	NAP	ULS	WIN	FRO	COR	EIF	ALB	PRI	ESS	MID	ROU	CRY	AVU	USF	LAC	BRI	CHE	SAB	NEW	CAD	RED	SKA	LON	MOD	MAD	JOE	CUR	
1953	BRM Ltd	BRM P15 1.5 V16s	D	Juan Manuel Fangio														Ret																					
1953	BRM Ltd	BRM P15 1.5 V16s	D	Jose Froilan Gonzalez														2																					
1953	BRM Ltd	BRM P15 1.5 V16s	D	Ken Wharton														Ret																					

== Other entries for BRM Type 15 ==
Date	Event	Circuit	Driver	Grid	Race	Notes
6 April 1953	Glover Trophy	(United Kingdom) Goodwood	Reg Parnell	3	Ret	Supercharger
6 April 1953	Glover Trophy	(United Kingdom) Goodwood	Ken Wharton	1	1	Damaged, car written off

== BRM P30 ==
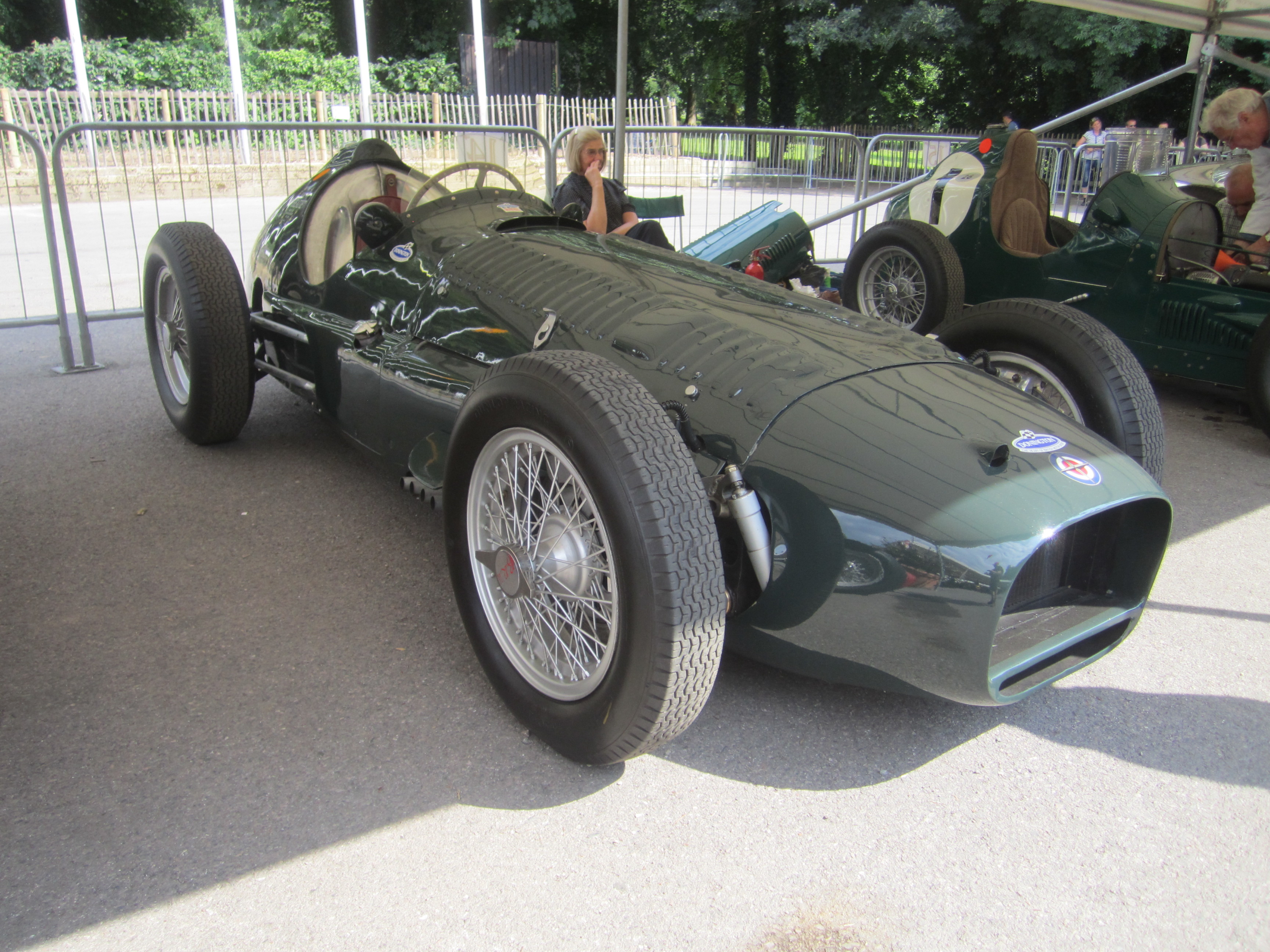
The BRM P30, lacking the blister intake above the main radiator opening

For 1954 an updated version of the Type 15 was produced which weighed over 200 lb (91 kg) less than the original car and featured a shorter wheelbase and a much smaller fuel tank, since the car was no longer taking part in long races. Wharton raced the old car in two races in New Zealand but could do no better than two third places because of car problems. The two new P30s, as the Mk.2 cars came to be known, appeared in thirteen races at ten different meetings in the year, driven by Wharton and Ron Flockhart. Between them they won five of the first six races, but various spins and problems prevented them from adding to their tally. By now though the team was working to get back into Formula One and 1955 was the car's last year of racing. From six races Peter Collins took two wins and Flockhart picked up two second places.

== Survivors ==
A total of four Type 15s were produced, one of which was written off by a collision during the Glover Trophy and salvaged for spares, while another car that crashed at Albi was used as the basis for one of the two P30s produced. One Type 15 is on display at the National Motor Museum in Beaulieu, the other is on display as part of the Donington Grand Prix Exhibition in its original light green paint scheme alongside a P30 and a cutaway V16 engine. The fourth surviving car, another P30, is in the ownership of Bernie Ecclestone, having previously been owned by Pink Floyd drummer Nick Mason. The cars can sometimes be seen in action at the various historic racing events such as the Goodwood Festival of Speed.
