= Geoff Richardson (racing driver) =

- Nationality: (United Kingdom) British
- Born: 26 August 1924
- Died: 20 August 2007 (aged 82)
- Starts: 23 non-Championship Formula One races
- Wins: 0
- Poles: 0
- Fastest laps: 0

Geoff Richardson (26 August 1924 – 20 August 2007) was a British racing driver.

== Career ==
Although he never took part a World Championship Formula One event, he took part in the 1948 British Grand Prix, participated in many non-championship Formula One and Formula Libre events from the 1940s to the 1960s, and enjoyed a varied motorsport career over several decades. He often raced self-built cars, many under the name of Richardson Racing Automobiles (RRA), among them a modified pre-war Riley, and sports cars based on Aston Martins. In 1953 he agreed to run a prototype Zethrin Rennsport in European events with the Belgian Jacques Swaters, but this project never got past a road-going prototype.

Richardson also took part in the Targa Florio in 1955, and the Intercontinental Formula that was devised as a rival to the new official 1.5-litre Formula One series in 1961.

Richardson did put in an entry for the 1958 British Grand Prix in an ex-works Connaught Type B which he had bought from Brian Naylor, having had a good run in the 1958 International Trophy, but the British Racing Drivers Club turned his entry down in favour of two Connaughts from Bernie Ecclestone, much to Richardson's vocal displeasure.

== Results ==
=== Non-championship Formula One results ===
(key)

| Year | Entrant | Chassis | Engine | 1 | 2 | 3 | 4 | 5 | 6 | 7 | 8 | 9 | 10 | 11 | 12 | 13 | 14 | 15 | 16 | 17 | 18 | 19 | 20 | 21 | 22 | 23 | 24 | 25 | 26 | 27 | 28 | 29 | 30 | 31 | 32 | 33 | 34 | 35 |
|---|---|---|---|---|---|---|---|---|---|---|---|---|---|---|---|---|---|---|---|---|---|---|---|---|---|---|---|---|---|---|---|---|---|---|---|---|---|---|
| 1950 | Geoff Richardson | RRA | ERA S6 | PAU | RIC | SRM | PAR | EMP | BAR | JER | ALB | NED | NAT | NOT; 3 | ULS | PES | STT | INT; 13 | GOO; 10 | PEN | | | | | | | | | | | | | | | | | | |
| 1951 | Geoff Richardson | RRA | ERA S6 | SYR | PAU | RIC | SRM | BOR | INT; 13 | PAR | ULS; DNS | SCO | NED | ALB | PES | BAR | GOO | | | | | | | | | | | | | | | | | | | | | |
| 1952 | Geoff Richardson | RRA | Riley S6 | SYR | VAL | RIC | LAV | PAU | IBS | MAR | AST | INT; Ret | ELA | NAP | EIF | PAR | ALB | FRO | | | | | | | | | | | | | | | | | | | | |
| 1952 | Geoff Richardson | RRA | ERA S6 | | | | | | | | | | | | | | | | ULS; Ret | MZA | LAC | ESS | MAR | SAB | CAE | DMT | COM | NAT | BAU | MOD | SKA | CAD | MAD | AVU | FRY | NEW | | |
| 1953 | Geoff Richardson | RRA | Riley S6 | SYR | PAU | LAV | AST | BOR | INT; Ret | ELA | NAP | ULS; 10 | WIN | FRO | CLP | SNE | EIF | ALB | PRN | ESS | MID | ROU | CLP | AVU | UST | LAC | BRI | CHE | SAB | NEW | CAD | RED | SKA | LON | MOD | MAD | FRY | CUR |
| 1954 | Geoff Richardson | RRA | Riley S6 | SYR | PAU | LAV | BOR | INT; Ret | BAR | CUR | ROM | FRO | BRC | COR | CLP | ROU | CAE | | | | | | | | | | | | | | | | | | | | | |
| 1954 | Geoff Richardson | RRA | Alta S4 | | | | | | | | | | | | | | | AUG; Ret | COR | OUL | RED | PES | FRY | CAD | BER | GOO | DTT | | | | | | | | | | | |
| 1957 | Geoff Richardson | RRA | Jaguar S6 | AUS | SYR | PAU | GLV | NAP | RMS | CAE | INT; Ret | MOD | MOR | | | | | | | | | | | | | | | | | | | | | | | | | |
| 1958 | Geoff Richardson | Connaught Type B | Alta S4 | GLV; 10 | SYR; DNA | AIN; 15 | INT; 12 | CAE | | | | | | | | | | | | | | | | | | | | | | | | | | | | | | |
| 1960 | Geoff Richardson | Cooper-RRA T43 | Alta S4 | GLV | INT | SIL; 14 | LOM; Ret | OUL; Ret | | | | | | | | | | | | | | | | | | | | | | | | | | | | | | |

=== Other results ===
==== Formula One ====
- 1948 Jersey Road Race – 11th (ERA-Riley)
- 1948 British Grand Prix – Ret (Riley-ERA)
- 1949 British Empire Trophy – 11th (RRA-ERA)
- 1949 BRDC International Trophy – 21st (RRA-ERA)

==== Targa Florio ====
- 1955 Targa Florio – Ret (Lotus Connaught-Lea Francis)

==== Intercontinental Formula ====
- 1961 Lavant Cup – 9th (Cooper RRA-Alta)
- 1961 BRDC International Trophy – Ret (Cooper-Climax)
