= 1951 BRDC International Trophy =

- Non-championship race in the 1951 Formula One season
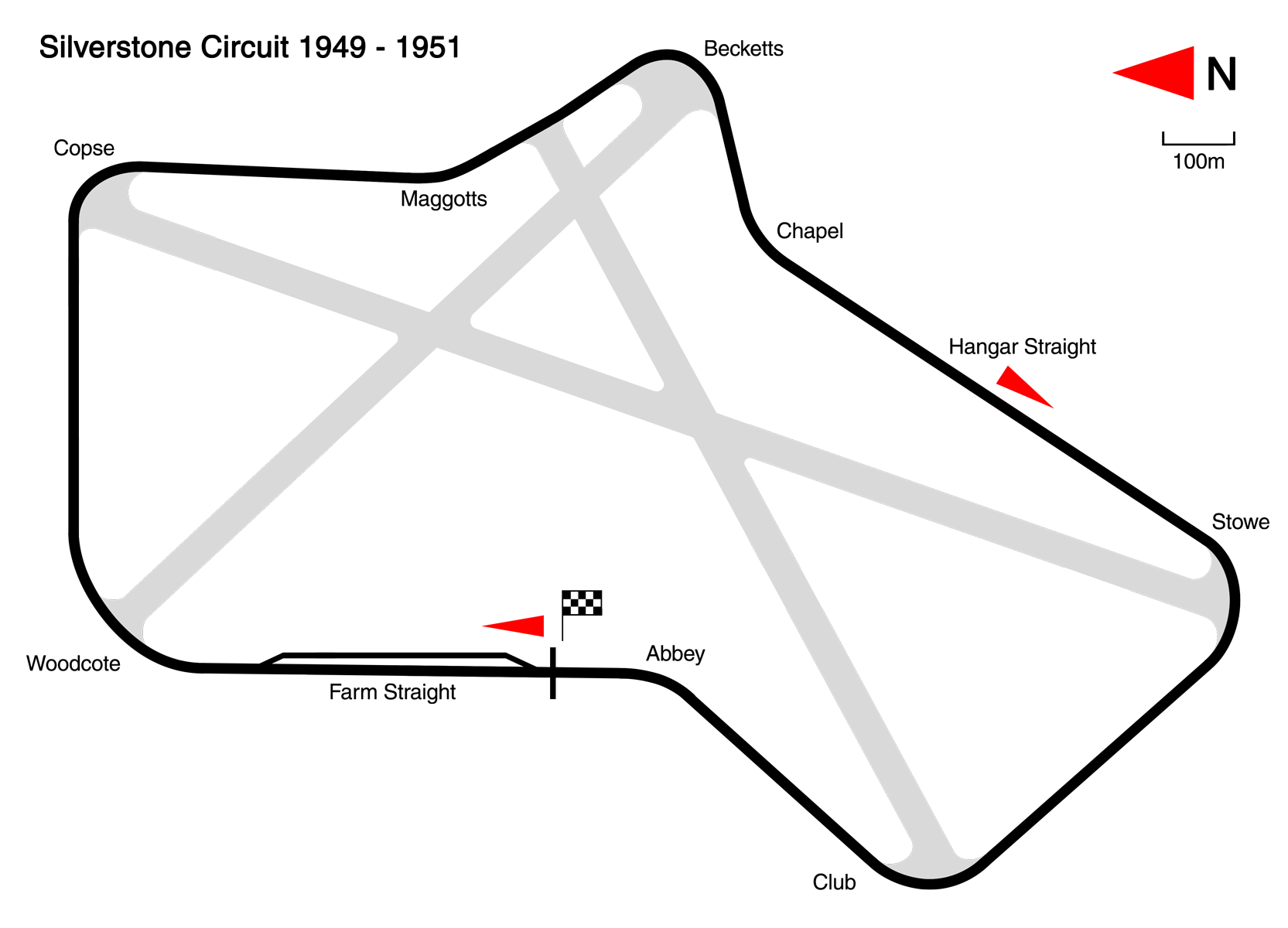

Race details
- Date: 5 May 1951
- Official name: International Daily Express Trophy
- Location: Silverstone Circuit, Northamptonshire
- Course: Permanent racing facility
- Course length: 4.649 km (2.888 miles)
- Distance: 6 laps, 27.888 km (17.387 miles)

Fastest lap
Driver	(United Kingdom) Reg Parnell	Ferrari
- Time: 2:38

Podium
First	(United Kingdom) Reg Parnell	Ferrari
Second	(United Kingdom) Duncan Hamilton	Talbot-Lago
Third	(United Kingdom) Graham Whitehead	ERA

The 3rd BRDC International Trophy meeting – formally the International Daily Express Trophy – was held on 5 May 1951 at the Silverstone Circuit, England. The race was run to Formula One regulations, and was held over two heats of 15 laps each, followed by a final race of 35 scheduled laps. However, the race was stopped after just six laps due to torrential rain and flooding. British driver Reg Parnell, driving a Ferrari 375, was declared the winner.

== Results ==
=== Final – 6 Laps ===
Pos	No.	Driver	Chassis	Time/Ret.
1	35	(United Kingdom) Reg Parnell	Ferrari 375	16:48, 61.89mph
2	31	(United Kingdom) Duncan Hamilton	Talbot-Lago T26C	+21s
3	14	(United Kingdom) Graham Whitehead	ERA B-Type	+1 lap
4	1	(Argentina) Juan Manuel Fangio	Alfa Romeo 159	+1 lap
5	33	(France) Louis Rosier	Talbot-Lago T26C	+1 lap
6	28	(France) Maurice Trintignant	Simca Gordini Type 15	+1 lap
7	7	(United Kingdom) Tony Rolt	Delage Type 15 S8	+1 lap
8	29	(Belgium) Johnny Claes	Talbot-Lago T26C	+1 lap
9	2	(Italy) Giuseppe Farina	Alfa Romeo 159	+1 lap
10	3	(Italy) Felice Bonetto	Alfa Romeo 159	+1 lap
11	32	(France) Henri Louveau	Talbot-Lago T26C	+1 lap
12	34	(France) Philippe Étancelin	Talbot-Lago T26C	+1 lap
13	30	(United Kingdom) Geoff Richardson	RRA-ERA	+1 lap
14	19	(United Kingdom) Stirling Moss	HWM-Alta	+1 lap
15	10	(United Kingdom) Bob Gerard	ERA B-Type	+1 lap
16	4	(Italy) Consalvo Sanesi	Alfa Romeo 159	+1 lap
17	26	(Thailand) B. Bira	Maserati 4CLT-48	+1 lap
NC	21	(Switzerland) Emmanuel de Graffenried	Maserati 4CLT-48	+2 laps
NC	20	(United States) Harry Schell	Maserati 4CLT-48	+2 laps
NC	22	(United Kingdom) David Hampshire	Maserati 4CLT-48	+2 laps
NC	25	(United Kingdom) David Murray	Maserati 4CLT-48	+2 laps
NC	27	(France) Robert Manzon	Simca Gordini Type 15	+2 laps
NC	5	(Republic of Ireland) Joe Kelly	Alta GP	+3 laps
NC	8	(United Kingdom) Gordon Watson	Alta F2	+3 laps
Ret.	9	(United Kingdom) Edward Miles-Martin	ERA A-Type	2 laps, accident
Ret.	12	(United Kingdom) Philip Fotheringham-Parker	ERA B-Type	2 laps, accident
DNS	11	(United Kingdom) Brian Shawe-Taylor	ERA B-Type	-
DNS	6	(Australia) Tony Gaze	Alta-F2	-
DNS	17	(United Kingdom) George Abecassis	HWM-Alta	-

=== Heats – 15 Laps ===
Heat 1

Pos	Driver	Team	Time/Ret.
1	(Argentina) Juan Manuel Fangio	Alfa Corse	28:27, 91.39mph
2	(United Kingdom) Reg Parnell	GA Vandervell	+3s
3	(Italy) Felice Bonetto	Alfa Corse	+45s
4	(France) Robert Manzon	Equipe Gordini	+46s
5	(United Kingdom) Brian Shawe-Taylor	Brian Shawe-Taylor	+1:13
6	(United Kingdom) Stirling Moss	Hersham and Walton Motors	+1:54
7	(France) Louis Rosier	Ecurie Rosier	+1 lap
8	(Switzerland) Emmanuel de Graffenried	Enrico Plate	+1 lap
9	(United Kingdom) Tony Rolt	Rob Walker Racing	+1 lap
10	(United Kingdom) David Murray	Scuderia Ambrosiana	+1 lap
11	(United Kingdom) Duncan Hamilton	Duncan Hamilton	+1 lap
12	(Republic of Ireland) Joe Kelly	Joe Kelly	+1 lap
13	(United Kingdom) Edward Miles-Martin	Edward Miles-Martin	+2 laps
NC	(Belgium) Johnny Claes	Ecurie Belge	+7 laps
Ret	(United Kingdom) John James	John James	3 laps
Ret	(United Kingdom) George Abecassis	Hersham and Walton Motors	3 laps

- Fastest lap: Juan Manuel Fangio – 1:49
Heat 2

Pos	Driver	Entrant	Time/Ret.
1	(Italy) Giuseppe Farina	Alfa Corse	27:51, 93.36mph
2	(Italy) Consalvo Sanesi	Alfa Corse	+31s
3	(Thailand) B. Bira	Ecurie Siam	+59s
4	(United Kingdom) Bob Gerard	Bob Gerard	+1:01
5	(France) Maurice Trintignant	Equipe Gordini	+1:15
6	(United Kingdom) David Hampshire	David Hampshire	+1:36
7	(France) Philippe Étancelin	Philippe Étancelin	+1 lap
8	(United Kingdom) Graham Whitehead	Peter Whitehead	+1 lap
9	(United States) Harry Schell	Enrico Plate	+1 lap
10	(United Kingdom) Geoff Richardson	Geoff Richardson	+1 lap
11	(France) Henri Louveau	Ecurie Rosier	+1 lap
12	(United Kingdom) Philip Fotheringham-Parker	Philip Fotheringham-Parker	+1 lap
13	(Australia) Tony Gaze	Tony Gaze	+2 lap
14	(United Kingdom) Gordon Watson	Gordon Watson	+2 laps

- Fastest lap: Giuseppe Farina – 1:47

Previous race: 1951 Bordeaux Grand Prix	Formula One non-championship races 1951 season	Next race: 1951 Paris Grand Prix
Previous race: 1950 BRDC International Trophy	BRDC International Trophy	Next race: 1952 BRDC International Trophy
