= 1950 BRDC International Trophy =

- Non-championship race in the 1950 Formula One season
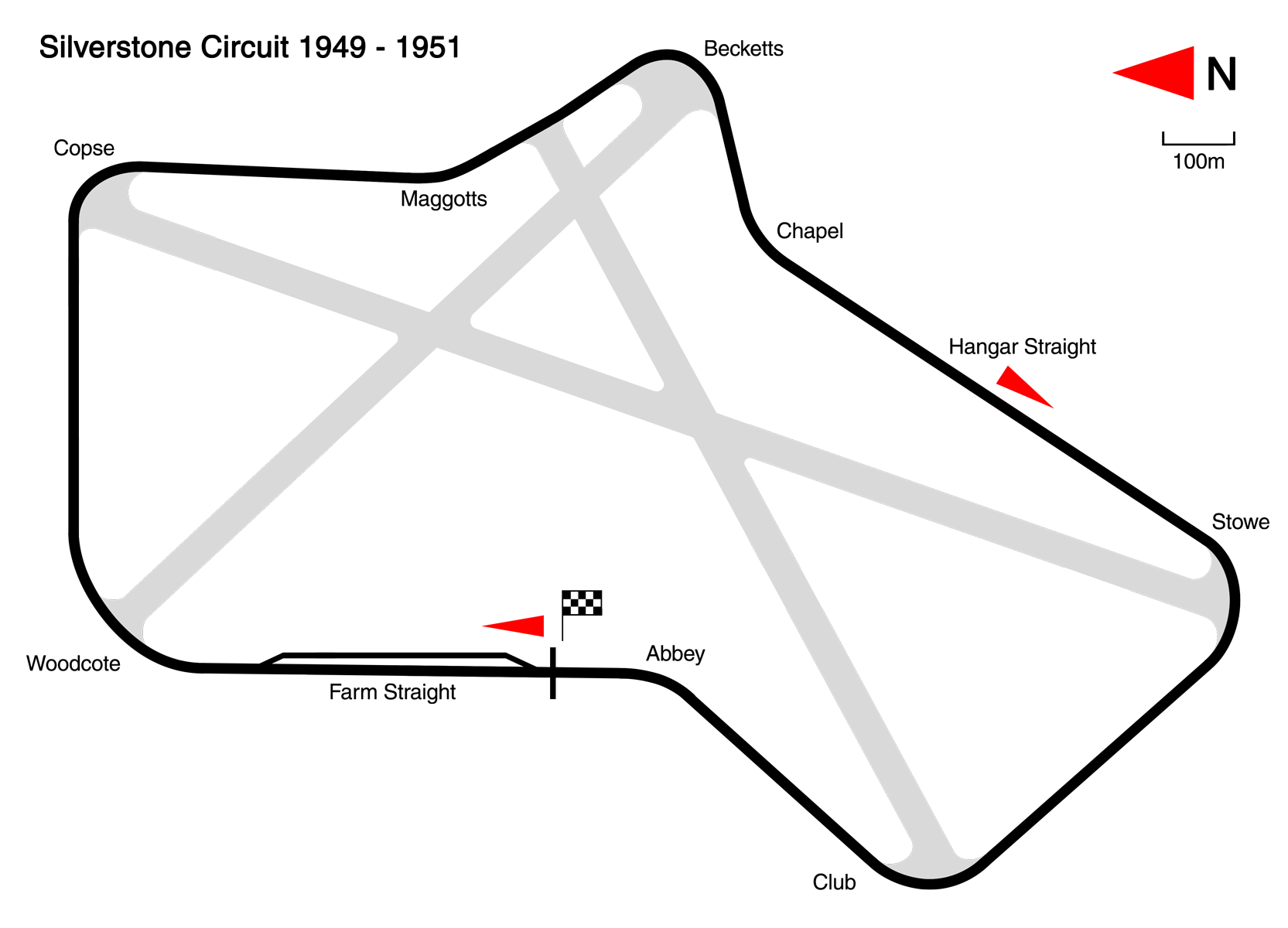

Race details
- Date: 26 August 1950
- Official name: International Daily Express Trophy
- Location: Silverstone Circuit, Northamptonshire
- Course: Permanent racing facility
- Course length: 4.649 km (2.888 miles)
- Distance: 35 laps, 162.716 km (101.106,8 miles)

Pole position
Driver	(Argentina) Juan Manuel Fangio	Alfa Romeo

Fastest lap
Drivers	(Argentina) Juan Manuel Fangio	Alfa Romeo
	(Italy) Nino Farina	Alfa Romeo
- Time: 1:52.0

Podium
First	(Italy) Nino Farina	Alfa Romeo
Second	(Argentina) Juan Manuel Fangio	Alfa Romeo
Third	(United Kingdom) Peter Whitehead	Ferrari

The 2nd BRDC International Trophy meeting – formally the International Daily Express Trophy – was held on 26 August 1950 at the Silverstone Circuit, England. The race was run to Formula One regulations, and was held over two heats of 15 laps each, followed by a final race of 35 laps. Italian driver Nino Farina emerged the winner, in an Alfa Romeo 158, repeating his victory from the 1950 British Grand Prix, held at the same circuit in May. He beat his Argentine team-mate Juan Manuel Fangio, and British driver Peter Whitehead in a Ferrari. Other notable entrants were the two BRM V16 cars entered for Raymond Sommer, Peter Walker, Raymond Mays and Reg Parnell. However, their legendary lack of reliability resulted in neither car completing a lap in anger.

== Results ==
=== Final – 35 Laps ===
Pos	Driver	Chassis	Engine	Laps	Time/Ret.
1	(Italy) Nino Farina	Alfa Romeo 158	Alfa Romeo	35	1:07:17.0
2	(Argentina) Juan Manuel Fangio	Alfa Romeo 158	Alfa Romeo	35	+ 10.4s
3	(United Kingdom) Peter Whitehead	Ferrari 125	Ferrari	35	+ 1:04.4
4	(United Kingdom) Cuth Harrison	ERA B	ERA	35	+ 1:05.0
5	(United Kingdom) Brian Shawe-Taylor	ERA B	ERA	34	+ 1 lap
6	(United Kingdom) Stirling Moss	HWM	Alta	34	+ 1 lap
7	(France) Yves Giraud-Cabantous	Talbot-Lago T26C	Talbot	34	+ 1 lap
8	(Monaco) Louis Chiron	Maserati 4CLT-48	Maserati	33	+ 2 laps
9	(United Kingdom) Bob Gerard	ERA B	ERA	32	accident
10	(United Kingdom) David Hampshire	Maserati 4CLT-48	Maserati	32	+ 3 laps
11	(France) Pierre Levegh	Talbot-Lago T26C	Talbot	32	+ 3 laps
12	(United Kingdom) Philip Fotheringham-Parker	Maserati 6CM	Maserati	32	+ 3 laps
13	(United Kingdom) Geoff Richardson	RRA	RRA	31	+ 4 laps
NC	(United Kingdom) Gordon Watson	Alta F2	Alta	30	+ 5 laps
Ret	(United Kingdom) Fergus Anderson	HWM	HWM	28	Gearbox
Ret	(United Kingdom) Colin Murray	Maserati 6CL	Maserati	13	?
Ret	(United Kingdom) Reg Parnell	Maserati 4CLT-48	Maserati	9	Engine
Ret	(United Kingdom) David Murray	Maserati 4CLT-48	Maserati	2	Oil pipe
Ret	(France) Philippe Étancelin	Talbot-Lago T26C	Talbot	2	Rear axle

- Fastest lap: Nino Farina and Juan Manuel Fangio – 1:52

=== Heats – 15 Laps ===
(Note: Drivers indicated in bold qualified for the final)

**Heat 1**

Pos	Driver	Constructor	Laps	Time/Ret.
1	(Italy) **Nino Farina**	Alfa Romeo	15	28:53
2	(United Kingdom) **Reg Parnell**	Maserati	15	+ 29s
3	(United Kingdom) **Peter Whitehead**	Ferrari	15	+ 31s
4	(United Kingdom) **Cuth Harrison**	ERA	15	+ 33s
5	(France) **Philippe Étancelin**	Talbot-Lago	15	+ 56s
6	(France) **Pierre Levegh**	Talbot-Lago	14	+ 1 lap
7	(United Kingdom) **Fergus Anderson**	HWM	14	+ 1 lap
8	(United Kingdom) **Philip Fotheringham-Parker**	Maserati	14	+ 1 lap
9	(United Kingdom) **Colin Murray**	Maserati	13	+ 2 laps
NC	(United Kingdom) **Geoff Richardson**	RRA	12	+ 3 laps
Ret	(United Kingdom) Tony Rolt	Delage 15S8	?	Gearbox
Ret	(United Kingdom) Archie Butterworth	AJB-Steyr	1	Crankshaft

- Fastest lap: Nino Farina – 1:52
**Heat 2**

Pos	Driver	Constructor	Laps	Time/Ret.
1	(Argentina) **Juan Manuel Fangio**	Alfa Romeo	15	33:53
2	(United Kingdom) **Brian Shawe-Taylor**	ERA	15	+ 32s
3	(United Kingdom) **Bob Gerard**	ERA	15	+ 1:27
4	(United Kingdom) **David Hampshire**	Maserati	14	+ 1 lap
5	(United Kingdom) **David Murray**	Maserati	14	+ 1 lap
6	(United Kingdom) **Gordon Watson**	Alta	14	+ 1 lap
7	(Monaco) **Louis Chiron**	Maserati	14	+ 1 lap
8	(France) **Yves Giraud-Cabantous**	Talbot-Lago	14	+ 1 lap
9	(United Kingdom) **Stirling Moss**	HWM	14	+ 1 lap
Ret	(Republic of Ireland) Joe Kelly	Alta GP	?	DNF
Ret	(Italy) Alberto Ascari	Ferrari 125	7	Spin
Ret	(United Kingdom) Leslie Brooke	Maserati 4CLT-48	6	Accident
Ret	(United Kingdom) Michael Chorlton	Bugatti T51A	4	Valve
Ret	(Belgium) Johnny Claes	Talbot-Lago T26C	1	Spin
Ret	(France) Raymond Sommer	BRM P15	1	Transmission

- Fastest lap: Juan Manuel Fangio – 1:52

Previous race: 1950 Sheffield Telegraph Trophy	Formula One non-championship races 1950 season	Next race: 1950 Goodwood Trophy
Previous race: 1949 BRDC International Trophy	BRDC International Trophy	Next race: 1951 BRDC International Trophy
