= 1951 Ulster Trophy =

- Non-championship race in the 1951 Formula One season

Race details
- Date: 2 June 1951
- Official name: V Ulster Trophy
- Location: Dundrod, Northern Ireland
- Course: Dundrod Circuit
- Course length: 11.936 km (7.441 miles)
- Distance: 27 laps, 322.262 km (200.911 miles)

Pole position
Driver	(Italy) Giuseppe Farina	Alfa Romeo
- Time: 4:51.8

Fastest lap
Driver	(Italy) Giuseppe Farina	Alfa Romeo
- Time: 4:44.0

Podium
First	(Italy) Giuseppe Farina	Alfa Romeo
Second	(United Kingdom) Reg Parnell	Ferrari
Third	(United Kingdom) Brian Shawe-Taylor	ERA

The 1951 Ulster Trophy was a non-championship Formula One motor race held on 2 June 1951 at the Dundrod Circuit, in Northern Ireland. The race was won by Alfa Romeo driver Giuseppe Farina. Farina also set pole position and fastest lap.

== Classification ==
=== Race ===
Pos	No	Driver	Entrant	Car	Time/Retired	Grid
1	9	(Italy) Giuseppe Farina	Alfa Corse	Alfa Romeo 159	2:11:21.8, 91.77 mph	1
2	17	(United Kingdom) Reg Parnell	GA Vandervell	Ferrari 375	+72.4	2
3	3	(United Kingdom) Brian Shawe-Taylor	Brian Shawe-Taylor	ERA B-Type	+1 lap	3
4	2	(United Kingdom) Bob Gerard	Bob Gerard	ERA B-Type	+1 lap	4
5	6	(France) Yves Giraud-Cabantous	Yves Giraud-Cabantous	Talbot-Lago T26C	+1 lap	6
6	23	(United Kingdom) David Murray	Scuderia Ambrosiana	Maserati 4CLT/48	+2 laps	7
7	4	(France) Louis Rosier	Ecurie Rosier	Talbot-Lago T26C	+2 laps	14
8	18	(United Kingdom) Peter Walker	Rob Walker Racing Team	Delage 15 S8	+3 laps	11
9	8	(Belgium) Johnny Claes	Ecurie Belge	Talbot-Lago T26C	+3 laps	16
10	12	(United Kingdom) David Hampshire	Reg Parnell	Maserati 4CLT/48	+3 laps	10
11	21	(France) Philippe Étancelin	Philippe Étancelin	Talbot-Lago T26C	+3 laps	15
NC	5	(France) Guy Mairesse	Ecurie Rosier	Talbot-Lago T26C	+4 laps	17
NC	11	(United Kingdom) Philip Fotheringham-Parker	Duncan Hamilton	ERA B-Type	+9 laps	13
Ret	15	(Switzerland) Emmanuel de Graffenried	Enrico Platé	Maserati 4CLT/48	11 laps, oil leak	5
Ret	20	(United Kingdom) Ernie Wilkinson	Peter Whitehead	ERA B-Type	9 laps, piston	9
Ret	25	(Republic of Ireland) Joe Kelly	Joe Kelly	Alta GP	6 laps, piston	20
Ret	19	(United Kingdom) Graham Whitehead	Graham Whitehead	ERA B-Type	5 laps, fire	18
Ret	10	(United Kingdom) Duncan Hamilton	Duncan Hamilton	Talbot-Lago T26C	3 laps, camshaft	12
Ret	16	(France) Louis Chiron	Enrico Platé	Maserati 4CLT/48	3 laps, crash	19
DNS	1	(United Kingdom) Peter Whitehead	Peter Whitehead	Ferrari 125	Piston	18
DNS	22	(United Kingdom) Bobbie Baird	Bobbie Baird	Baird-Griffin	Engine	-
DNS	24	(United Kingdom) Geoff Richardson	Geoff Richardson	RRA-ERA	Crash	-
DNA	7	(Thailand) B. Bira	B. Bira	Maserati 4CLT/48	No engine available	-

Previous race: 1951 Paris Grand Prix	Formula One non-championship races 1951 season	Next race: 1951 Scottish Grand Prix
Previous race: 1950 Ulster Trophy	Ulster Trophy	Next race: 1952 Ulster Trophy
