= Ken Richardson (racing driver) =

British racing driver (1911–1997)

- Born: 21 August 1911; Bourne, Lincolnshire, England
- Died: 27 June 1997 (aged 85); Bourne, Lincolnshire, England

Formula One World Championship career
- Nationality: (United Kingdom) British
- Active years: 1951
- Team: BRM
- Entries: 1 (0 starts)
- Championships: 0
- Wins: 0
- Podiums: 0
- Career points: 0
- Pole positions: 0
- Fastest laps: 0
- First entry: 1951 Italian Grand Prix

William Kenneth Richardson (21 August 1911 – 27 June 1997) was a British racing and test/development driver from England who competed in one Formula One World Championship event.

== Career ==
Richardson started as an engineer for British Racing Motors, before becoming the main development driver for the BRM V16 project in the early 1950s; as reserve driver for the team, he took part in the 1949 British Grand Prix, taking over the Ferrari 125 (which Tony Vandervell had bought for research purposes) from Raymond Mays. Richardson only lasted 4 laps before hitting a bump at Abbey Curve, and spinning off into the crowd, fortunately without injuring anyone.

Richardson was entered by the team to drive a BRM 15, equipped with the V16 engine, in the 1951 Italian Grand Prix. He qualified the car 10th, but was not allowed to start the race when it emerged that he did not possess the correct racing licence due to his lack of experience. He did not make another attempt at entering a World Championship Formula One race.

Richardson did, however, continue to race in both sportscars and endurance events.

== Complete Formula One World Championship results ==
(key)

Year	Entrant	Chassis	Engine	1	2	3	4	5	6	7	8	WDC	Points
1951	BRM Ltd	BRM P15	BRM V16	SUI	500	BEL	FRA	GBR	GER	ITA; DNS	ESP	NC	0
