= 1952 Ulster Trophy =

- Non-championship race in the 1952 Formula One season

Race details
- Date: 7 June 1952
- Official name: VI Ulster Trophy
- Location: Dundrod Circuit, County Antrim, Northern Ireland
- Course: Temporary road circuit
- Course length: 11.934 km (7.415 mi)
- Distance: 34 laps, 405.761 km (252.128 mi)

Pole position
Driver	(Italy) Piero Taruffi	Ferrari
- Time: 5:06

Fastest lap
Driver	(Italy) Piero Taruffi	Ferrari
- Time: 4:53

Podium
First	(Italy) Piero Taruffi	Ferrari
Second	(United Kingdom) Mike Hawthorn	Cooper-Bristol
Third	(Republic of Ireland) Joe Kelly	Alta

The 6th Ulster Trophy was a non-championship Formula One motor race held at the Dundrod Circuit on 7 June 1952. The race was won from pole position by Piero Taruffi in a Ferrari 375, setting fastest lap in the process. Mike Hawthorn in a Cooper T20-Bristol was second and Joe Kelly third in an Alta GP.

== Results ==
Pos	No	Driver	Entrant	Car	Time/Retired	Grid
1	1	(Italy) Piero Taruffi	G.A. Vandervell	Ferrari 375	3:05:47.0, 81.71mph	1
2	16	(United Kingdom) Mike Hawthorn	L.D. Hawthorn	Cooper T20-Bristol	+3:26.4	2
3	14	(Republic of Ireland) Joe Kelly	J. Kelly	Alta GP	+6:55.0	5
4	20	(France) Louis Rosier	Ecurie Rosier	Ferrari 375	+8:26.6	3
5	12	(France) Philippe Étancelin	Philippe Étancelin	Talbot-Lago T26C	+1 lap	8
6	17	(United Kingdom) Oscar Moore	Oscar Moore	HWM-Jaguar	+3 laps	10
Ret	7	(Argentina) Juan Manuel Fangio	British Racing Motors	BRM P15	25 laps, engine	12^{1}
Ret	10	(United Kingdom) Ron Flockhart	Alba Union	ERA A-Type	18 laps, no fuel	6
Ret	3	(France) Yves Giraud-Cabantous	Y. Giraud-Cabantous	Talbot-Lago T26C	14 laps, engine	4
Ret	8	(United Kingdom) Stirling Moss	British Racing Motors	BRM P15	3 laps. engine	13^{1}
Ret	18	(United Kingdom) Geoff Richardson	G. Richardson	RRA-ERA	3 laps, clutch	7
Ret	6	(Thailand) B. Bira	Prince Bira	Maserati 4CLT/48	0 laps, crash	11
DSQ	4	(United Kingdom) Bobbie Baird	B. Baird	Baird-Griffin-Maserati	22 laps, oil leak	9
DNS	2	(United Kingdom) Graham Whitehead	G. Whitehead	ERA B-Type		-
DNA	5	(United Kingdom) David Griffin		Ferrari 125		-
DNA	11	(United Kingdom) Jimmy Somervail	Border Reivers	ERA B-Type		-
DNA	15	(United Kingdom) Hector Graham		Duesenberg		-
DNA	19	(Belgium) Johnny Claes	Ecurie Belge	Talbot-Lago T26C		-

^{1}Neither Fangio nor Moss recorded a time but were allowed to start from the rear of the grid.

Previous race: 1952 Frontieres Grand Prix	Formula One non-championship races 1952 season	Next race: 1952 Monza Grand Prix
Previous race: 1951 Ulster Trophy	Ulster Trophy	Next race: 1953 Ulster Trophy
