= 1951 Scottish Grand Prix =

- Non-championship race in the 1951 Formula One season

Race details
- Date: 21 July 1951
- Official name: I Scottish Grand Prix
- Location: Winfield, Berwickshire
- Course: Airfield circuit
- Course length: 3.219 km (2.000 mi)
- Distance: 50 laps, 160.946 km (100.007 mi)

Pole position
Driver	(United Kingdom) Reg Parnell	HWM

Fastest lap
Driver	(Republic of Ireland) Joe Kelly	Alta
- Time: 1:29.2

Podium
First	(United Kingdom) Philip Fotheringham-Parker	Maserati
Second	(United Kingdom) Gillie Tyrer	BMW
Third	(United Kingdom) Ian Stewart	Jaguar

The 1951 Scottish Grand Prix was a 50 lap 100-mile (160 km) motor race held on 21 July 1951 at Winfield Airfield in Berwickshire. Although run to Formula One regulations, the paucity of the entries led to the organisers opening up the race to other categories.

An entry had been made for the BRM Type 15 but it failed to appear. Its driver Reg Parnell was loaned local driver John Brown's HWM-Alta; Parnell started from pole position but broke a drive shaft as he left the start line. Archie Butterworth's 4WD A.J.B. led briefly before David Murray took over with a Maserati 4CLT. Joe Kelly's Alta challenged and set fastest lap but retired with gearbox problems. Murray retired with fuel pump problems and Philip Fotheringham-Parker took the lead in Duncan Hamilton's Maserati 4CL, chased home by Gillie Tyrer's BMW 328. Ian Stewart was third in an XK120.

== Results ==
Pos	No.	Driver	Chassis	Time/Retired	Grid
1	9	(United Kingdom) Philip Fotheringham-Parker	Maserati 4CL	1:19:27.0, 121.546kph	2
2	23	(United Kingdom) Gillie Tyrer	BMW 328	1:19:34.4	6
3	5	(United Kingdom) Ian Stewart	Jaguar XK120	+2 laps	10
4	27	(United Kingdom) Rob Dickson	Healey	+2 laps	5
NC	16	(United Kingdom) John Waugh	Jaguar XK120	+6 laps	8
Ret	3	(United Kingdom) David Murray	Maserati 4CLT/48	40 laps, fuel pump	4
Ret	1	(United Kingdom) Bill Skelly	Lea Francis		9
Ret	83	(Republic of Ireland) Joe Kelly	Alta GP	14 laps, gearbox	3
Ret	11	(United Kingdom) Archie Butterworth	A.J.B.-Steyr	13 laps, engine	7
Ret	10	(United Kingdom) Reg Parnell	HWM-Alta	0 laps, driveshaft	1
DNS	2	(United Kingdom) Ron Flockhart	JP-Vincent		
DNS	2	(United Kingdom) Bill Black	Jaguar XK120		
DNS	10	(United Kingdom) John Brown	HWM-Alta	car driven by Parnell	

== Other reading ==
- Paul Sheldon with Duncan Rabagliati (1988). A Record of Grand Prix and Voiturette Racing Volume 5 1950–53. St Leonards Press. pp. 107–108. ISBN 0-9512433-2-2.

Previous race: 1951 Ulster Trophy	Formula One non-championship races 1951 season	Next race: 1951 Dutch Grand Prix
Previous race: —	Scottish Grand Prix	Next race: —
