= 1953 Ulster Trophy =

Race details
- Date: 16 May 1953
- Official name: VII Ulster Trophy
- Location: Dundrod Circuit, County Antrim, Northern Ireland
- Course: Temporary road circuit
- Course length: 11.942 km (7.420 mi)
- Distance: 14 laps, 167.191 km (103.888 mi)

Pole position
Driver	(United Kingdom) Mike Hawthorn	Ferrari

Fastest lap
Driver	(United Kingdom) Mike Hawthorn	Ferrari
- Time: 5:00

Podium
First	(United Kingdom) Mike Hawthorn	Ferrari
Second	(United Kingdom) Ken Wharton	Cooper-Bristol
Third	(United Kingdom) Bobbie Baird	Ferrari

The 7th Ulster Trophy was a non-championship Formula Two motor race held at the Dundrod Circuit on 16 May 1953. The race was held over two heats of 10 laps and a final of 14 laps. Mike Hawthorn driving a Ferrari 500 won the final from pole position ahead of the Cooper T23-Bristol of Ken Wharton and the Ferrari 500 of Bobbie Baird. Hawthorn also set fastest lap in the final, and overall fastest lap in the second heat which he also won, again from pole position. Stirling Moss in a Connaught Type A-Lea Francis set pole and fastest lap in the first heat but finished second behind Duncan Hamilton's HWM-Alta. Moss failed to start the final, while Hamilton finished sixth.

== Results ==
Pos	No	Driver	Entrant	Car	Time/Retired	Grid
1	1	(United Kingdom) Mike Hawthorn	Scuderia Ferrari	Ferrari 500	1:12:01.6, 139.20kph	1
2	39	(United Kingdom) Ken Wharton	Ken Wharton	Cooper T23-Bristol	+1:13.4	3
3	36	(United Kingdom) Bobbie Baird	Scuderia Irlandia	Ferrari 500	+1:46.5	2
4	4	(United Kingdom) Peter Whitehead	Atlantic Stable	Cooper T24-Alta	+3:13.4	6
5	14	(Monaco) Louis Chiron	Louis Chiron	O.S.C.A. Tipo 20	+3:30.0	7
6	28	(United Kingdom) Duncan Hamilton	HW Motors Ltd.	HWM-Alta	+3:56.4	8
7	5	(United Kingdom) Graham Whitehead	Atlantic Stable	Cooper T23-Bristol	+4:43.2	9
8	10	(United Kingdom) Kenneth McAlpine	Connaught Engineering	Connaught Type A-Lea Francis	+4:56.0	10
9	18	(United Kingdom) Jock Lawrence	Ecurie Ecosse	Cooper T20-Bristol	+5:04.4	11
10	34	(United Kingdom) Geoff Richardson	G. Richardson	RRA-Riley	+5:05.4	13
11	7	(United Kingdom) Jimmy Somervail	Border Reivers	Cooper T20-Bristol	+1 lap	14
12	17	(United Kingdom) James Scott Douglas	Ecurie Ecosse	Connaught Type A-Lea Francis	+1 lap	12
13	37	(Republic of Ireland) Torrie Large	Tony Gaze	Alta F2	+1 lap	17
14	35	(United Kingdom) Horace Richards	H.A. Richards	H.A.R.-Riley	+2 laps	18
Ret	9	(United Kingdom) Roy Salvadori	Connaught Engineering	Connaught Type A-Lea Francis	8 laps, rear axle	5
Ret	16	(United Kingdom) Gerry Dunham	Gerry Dunham	DHS-Rover	1 lap, engine	15
Ret	2	(Republic of Ireland) Joe Kelly	Joe Kelly	Alta-Bristol	1 lap, valve	16
DNS	32	(United Kingdom) Stirling Moss	R.R.C. Walker Racing Team	Connaught Type A-Lea Francis	gearbox	4
DNS	30	(United Kingdom) John Lyons	William Knight	Connaught Type A-Lea Francis	front suspension	-
DNS	12	(Belgium) Jacques Swaters	Ecurie Francorchamps	Ferrari 500	magneto	-
DNQ	6	(Thailand) B. Bira	Prince Birabongse	Maserati A6GCM	Ret. heat 2, axle casing	-
DNQ	26	(United Kingdom) Peter Collins	HW Motors Ltd.	HWM-Alta	Ret. heat 2, misfire	-
DNQ	27	(United Kingdom) Lance Macklin	HW Motors Ltd.	HWM-Alta	Ret. heat 2, withdrawn	-
DNQ	25	(Switzerland) Emmanuel de Graffenried	Baron Graffenried	Maserati A6GCM	Ret. heat 2, rear axle	-
DNQ	24	(Switzerland) Ottorino Volonterio	Baron Graffenried	Maserati 4CLT/48		-
DNQ	8	(United Kingdom) Archie Bryde	Archie Bryde	Cooper T20-Bristol	Ret. heat 1, carburettor	-
DNQ	33	(Republic of Ireland) Dick Odlum	Dick Odlum	Frazer Nash-Bristol	Ret. heat 1, mechanical	-

Previous race: 1953 Naples Grand Prix	Formula One non-championship races 1953 season	Next race: 1953 Winfield JC Formula 2 Race
Previous race: 1952 Ulster Trophy	Ulster Trophy	Next race: 1955 Ulster Trophy
