= 1951 Formula One season =

5th season of FIA's Formula One motor racing

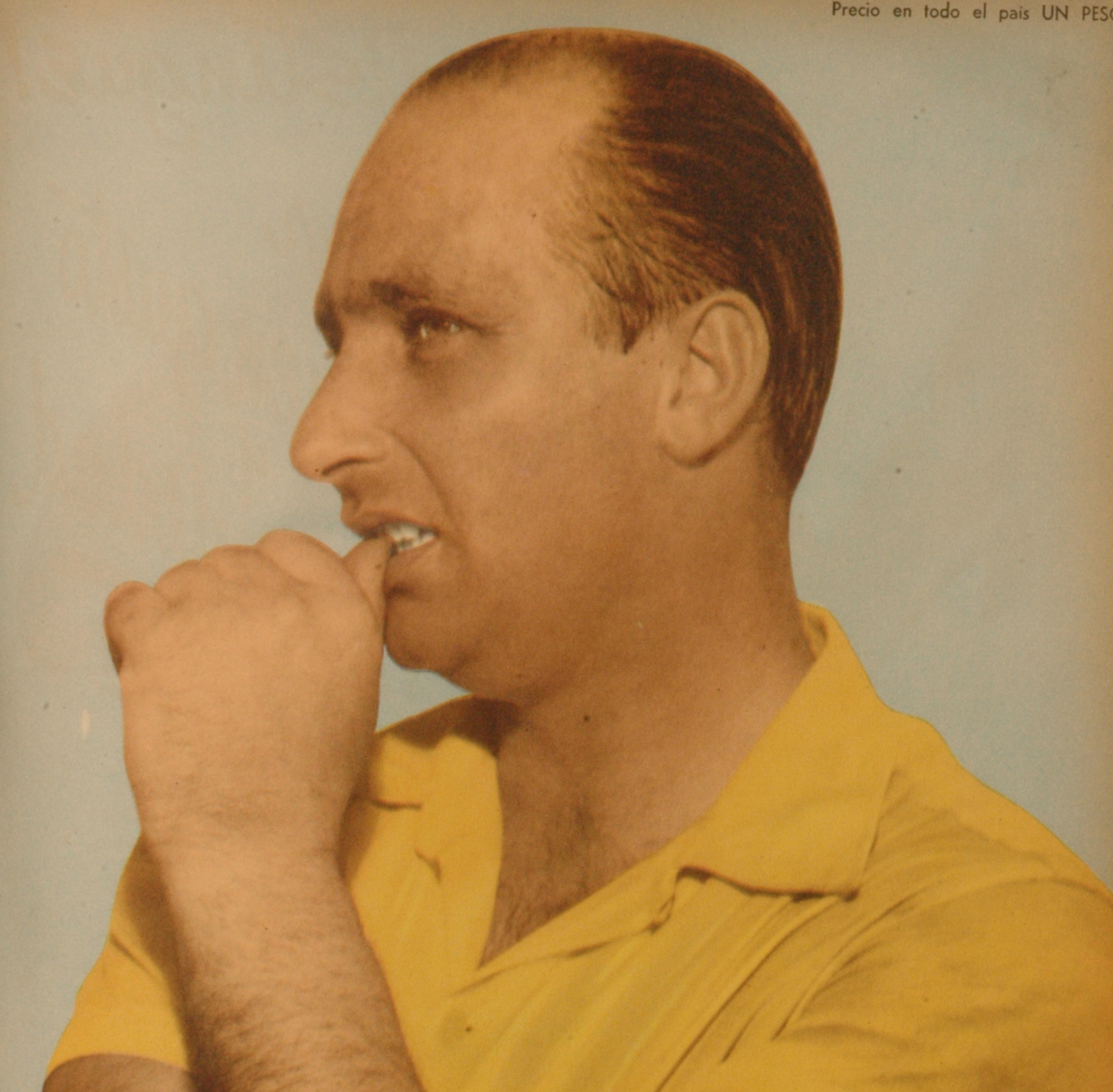
Juan Manuel Fangio driving for Alfa Romeo won the first of his 5 world championships in the 1951 World Championship of Drivers.

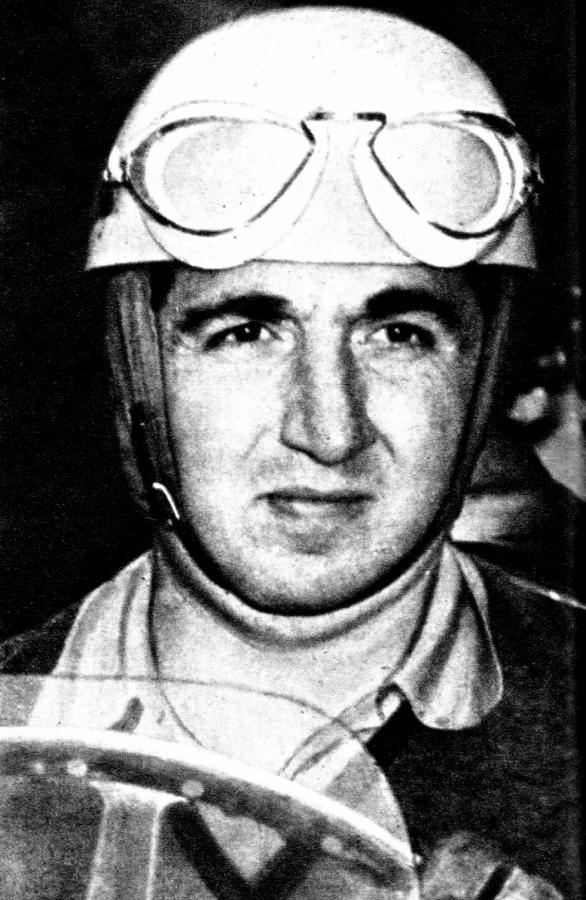
Alberto Ascari finished runner-up in the World Championship of Drivers.

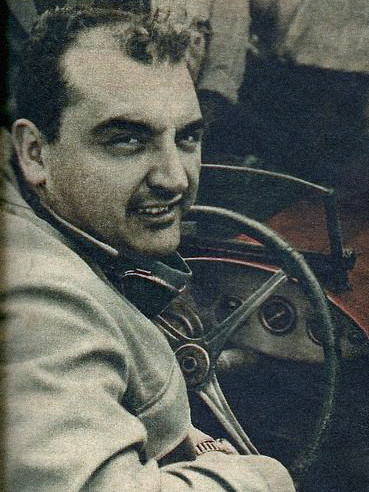
José Froilán González finished in third place in the World Championship of Drivers.

The 1951 Formula One season was the fifth season of FIA Formula One motor racing. It featured the second World Championship of Drivers, which was contested over eight races between 27 May and 28 October 1951. The season also included several non-championship races for Formula One cars.

Juan Manuel Fangio won his first Drivers' Championship, beating reigning champion and Alfa Romeo teammate Nino Farina, as well as several drivers from their main rival, Ferrari. Alfa Romeo has not won any Formula One championship since.

Multiple teams, including Alfa Romeo, were running chassis from before World War II. Regulation changes for 1952, however, would make them obsolete.

== Teams and drivers ==
The following teams and drivers competed in the 1951 FIA World Championship of Drivers. The list does not include those that only contested the Indianapolis 500.

| Entrant | Constructor | Chassis | Engine | Tyre | Driver | Rounds |
|---|---|---|---|---|---|---|
| (Belgium) Ecurie Belge | Talbot-Lago | T26C | Talbot 23CV 4.5 L6 | D | (Belgium) Johnny Claes | 1, 3–8 |
| (France) Philippe Étancelin | Talbot-Lago | T26C | Talbot 23CV 4.5 L6 | D | (France) Philippe Étancelin^{4} | 1, 3–6, 8 |
| (France) Yves Giraud-Cabantous | Talbot-Lago | T26C | Talbot 23CV 4.5 L6 | D | (France) Yves Giraud-Cabantous | 1, 3–4, 6–8 |
| (France) Yves Giraud-Cabantous | Talbot-Lago | T26C | Talbot 23CV 4.5 L6 | D | (France) Guy Mairesse | 1, 4 |
| (France) Ecurie Rosier | Talbot-Lago | T26C | Talbot 23CV 4.5 L6 | D | (France) Louis Rosier | 1, 3–8 |
| (France) Ecurie Rosier | Talbot-Lago | T26C | Talbot 23CV 4.5 L6 | D | (France) Henri Louveau | 1 |
| (France) Ecurie Rosier | Talbot-Lago | T26C | Talbot 23CV 4.5 L6 | D | (Monaco) Louis Chiron | 3–8 |
| (United Kingdom) HW Motors | HWM-Alta | 51 | Alta F2 2.0 L4 | D | (United Kingdom) George Abecassis | 1 |
| (United Kingdom) HW Motors | HWM-Alta | 51 | Alta F2 2.0 L4 | D | (United Kingdom) Stirling Moss | 1 |
| (Italy) Scuderia Ferrari | Ferrari | 375 | Ferrari 375 4.5 V12 | P E | (Italy) Luigi Villoresi | 1, 3–8 |
| (Italy) Scuderia Ferrari | Ferrari | 375 | Ferrari 375 4.5 V12 | P E | (Italy) Alberto Ascari | 1, 3–8 |
| (Italy) Scuderia Ferrari | Ferrari | 375 | Ferrari 375 4.5 V12 | P E | (Italy) Piero Taruffi^{3} | 1, 3-4, 6–8 |
| (Italy) Scuderia Ferrari | Ferrari | 375 | Ferrari 375 4.5 V12 | P E | (Argentina) José Froilán González | 4–8 |
| (Italy) Alfa Romeo SpA | Alfa Romeo | 159 | Alfa Romeo 158 1.5 L8 s | P | (Italy) Giuseppe Farina | 1, 3–8 |
| (Italy) Alfa Romeo SpA | Alfa Romeo | 159 | Alfa Romeo 158 1.5 L8 s | P | (Argentina) Juan Manuel Fangio | 1, 3–8 |
| (Italy) Alfa Romeo SpA | Alfa Romeo | 159 | Alfa Romeo 158 1.5 L8 s | P | (Switzerland) Toulo de Graffenried | 1, 7–8 |
| (Italy) Alfa Romeo SpA | Alfa Romeo | 159 | Alfa Romeo 158 1.5 L8 s | P | (Italy) Consalvo Sanesi | 1, 3–5 |
| (Italy) Alfa Romeo SpA | Alfa Romeo | 159 | Alfa Romeo 158 1.5 L8 s | P | (Italy) Luigi Fagioli | 4 |
| (Italy) Alfa Romeo SpA | Alfa Romeo | 159 | Alfa Romeo 158 1.5 L8 s | P | (Italy) Felice Bonetto | 5–8 |
| (Italy) Alfa Romeo SpA | Alfa Romeo | 159 | Alfa Romeo 158 1.5 L8 s | P | (West Germany) Paul Pietsch | 6 |
| (Switzerland) Enrico Platé | Maserati | 4CLT/48 | Maserati 4CLT 1.5 L4 s | P | (Monaco) Louis Chiron | 1 |
| (Switzerland) Enrico Platé | Maserati | 4CLT/48 | Maserati 4CLT 1.5 L4 s | P | (United States) Harry Schell | 1, 4 |
| (Switzerland) Enrico Platé | Maserati | 4CLT/48 | Maserati 4CLT 1.5 L4 s | P | (Argentina) José Froilán González^{2} | 3 |
| (Switzerland) Enrico Platé | Maserati | 4CLT/48 | Maserati 4CLT 1.5 L4 s | P | (Switzerland) Toulo de Graffenried | 4, 6 |
| (Switzerland) Enrico Platé | Maserati | 4CLT/48 | Maserati 4CLT 1.5 L4 s | P | (West Germany) Paul Pietsch (Note: Pietsch was also entered in the No. 80 Maserati. He only participated with the Maserati in practice and qualified and raced in the No. 78 Alfa Romeo.) | 6 |
| (Switzerland) Ecurie Espadon | Ferrari | 212 | Ferrari 212 2.5 V12 | P | (Switzerland) Rudi Fischer | 1, 6–7 |
| (Switzerland) Ecurie Espadon | Veritas | Meteor | Veritas 2.0 L6 | P | (Switzerland) Peter Hirt | 1 |
| (Argentina) José Froilán González | Talbot-Lago | T26C | Talbot 23CV 4.5 L6 | D | (Argentina) José Froilán González | 1 |
| (Switzerland) Francis Rochat | Simca-Gordini | T11 | Gordini 16C 1.5 L4 s | E | (Switzerland) Francis Rochat^{1} | 1 |
| (United Kingdom) Peter Whitehead | Ferrari | 125 | Ferrari 125 1.5 V12 s | D | (United Kingdom) Peter Whitehead | 1, 7 |
| (Belgium) Ecurie Belgique | Talbot-Lago | T26C | Talbot 23CV 4.5 L6 | D | (Belgium) André Pilette | 3 |
| (Belgium) Ecurie Belgique | Talbot-Lago | T26C | Talbot 23CV 4.5 L6 | D | (Belgium) Jacques Swaters | 6–7 |
| (France) Pierre Levegh | Talbot-Lago | T26C | Talbot 23CV 4.5 L6 | D | (France) Pierre Levegh | 3, 6–7 |
| (United Kingdom) GA Vandervell | Ferrari | 375 tw | Ferrari 375 4.5 V12 | P | (United Kingdom) Reg Parnell^{2} | 3-4 |
| (United Kingdom) GA Vandervell | Ferrari | 375 tw | Ferrari 375 4.5 V12 | P | (United Kingdom) Peter Whitehead | 5 |
| (United Kingdom) Graham Whitehead | Ferrari | 125 | Ferrari 125 1.5 V12 s | D | (United Kingdom) Peter Whitehead | 4 |
| (France) Equipe Gordini | Simca-Gordini | T15; T11 | Gordini 15C 1.5 L4 s | E | (France) Robert Manzon^{1}^{4} | 1, 4–8 |
| (France) Equipe Gordini | Simca-Gordini | T15; T11 | Gordini 15C 1.5 L4 s | E | (France) Maurice Trintignant^{1}^{4} | 1, 4–8 |
| (France) Equipe Gordini | Simca-Gordini | T15; T11 | Gordini 15C 1.5 L4 s | E | (France) André Simon^{1}^{4} | 1, 4–8 |
| (France) Equipe Gordini | Simca-Gordini | T15; T11 | Gordini 15C 1.5 L4 s | E | (France) Aldo Gordini | 4 |
| (France) Equipe Gordini | Simca-Gordini | T15; T11 | Gordini 15C 1.5 L4 s | E | (France) Jean Behra (Note: Behra secretly replaced the unwell Trintignant for the race of the Italian Grand Prix. Team principal Amédée Gordini did not inform the race organizers about this change as it would have reduced the starting fee the team received. Behra even wore his compatriot’s helmet to disguise the switch.) | 7 |
| (France) Eugène Chaboud | Talbot-Lago | T26C | Talbot 23CV 4.5 L6 | D | (France) Eugène Chaboud | 4 |
| (Italy) Scuderia Milano | Maserati-Speluzzi | 4CLT/50 | Speluzzi 1.5 L4 | P | (Argentina) Onofre Marimón | 4 |
| (Italy) Scuderia Milano | Maserati-Speluzzi | 4CLT/50 | Speluzzi 1.5 L4 | P | (Spain) Paco Godia | 8 |
| (Italy) Scuderia Milano | Maserati-Speluzzi | 4CLT/50 | Speluzzi 1.5 L4 | P | (Spain) Juan Jover | 8 |
| (Republic of Ireland) Joe Kelly | Alta | GP | Alta 1.5 L4 s | D | (Republic of Ireland) Joe Kelly | 5 |
| (United Kingdom) BRM Ltd | BRM | P15 | BRM P15 1.5 V16 s | D | (United Kingdom) Reg Parnell | 5, 7 |
| (United Kingdom) BRM Ltd | BRM | P15 | BRM P15 1.5 V16 s | D | (United Kingdom) Peter Walker | 5 |
| (United Kingdom) BRM Ltd | BRM | P15 | BRM P15 1.5 V16 s | D | (United Kingdom) Ken Richardson | 7 |
| (United Kingdom) BRM Ltd | BRM | P15 | BRM P15 1.5 V16 s | D | (West Germany) Hans Stuck | 7 |
| (United Kingdom) Bob Gerard | ERA | B | ERA 1.5 L6 s | D | (United Kingdom) Bob Gerard | 5 |
| (United Kingdom) Brian Shawe-Taylor | ERA | B | ERA 1.5 L6 s | D | (United Kingdom) Brian Shawe-Taylor | 5 |
| (Italy) Scuderia Ambrosiana | Maserati | 4CLT/48 | Maserati 4CLT 1.5 L4 s | D | (United Kingdom) David Murray | 5–6 |
| (United Kingdom) John James | Maserati | 4CLT/48 | Maserati 4CLT 1.5 L4 s | D | (United Kingdom) John James | 5 |
| (United Kingdom) Philip Fotheringham-Parker | Maserati | 4CL | Maserati 4CLT 1.5 L4 s | D | (United Kingdom) Philip Fotheringham-Parker | 5 |
| (United Kingdom) Duncan Hamilton | Talbot-Lago | T26C | Talbot 23CV 4.5 L6 | D | (United Kingdom) Duncan Hamilton | 5–6 |
| (Switzerland) Antonio Branca | Maserati | 4CLT/48 | Maserati 4CLT 1.5 L4 s | P | (Switzerland) Toni Branca^{1} | 1, 6 |
| (Italy) OSCA Automobili | OSCA | 4500G | OSCA 4500 4.5 V12 | P | (Italy) Franco Rol | 7 |
| (Brazil) Francisco Landi | Ferrari | 375 | Ferrari 375 4.5 V12 | P | (Brazil) Chico Landi | 7 |
| (Thailand) Birabongse Bhanudej | Maserati-OSCA | 4CLT/48 | OSCA 4500 4.5 V12 | P | (Thailand) Birabongse Bhanudej^{1}^{2}^{3} | 1, 3-4, 8 |
| (France) Georges Grignard | Talbot-Lago | T26C | Talbot 23CV 4.5 L6 | D | (France) Georges Grignard | 8 |

^1 – Did not attend on Swiss Grand Prix
^2 – Did not attend on Belgian Grand Prix
^3 – Did not attend on French Grand Prix
^4 – Did not attend on British Grand Prix

=== Team and driver changes ===
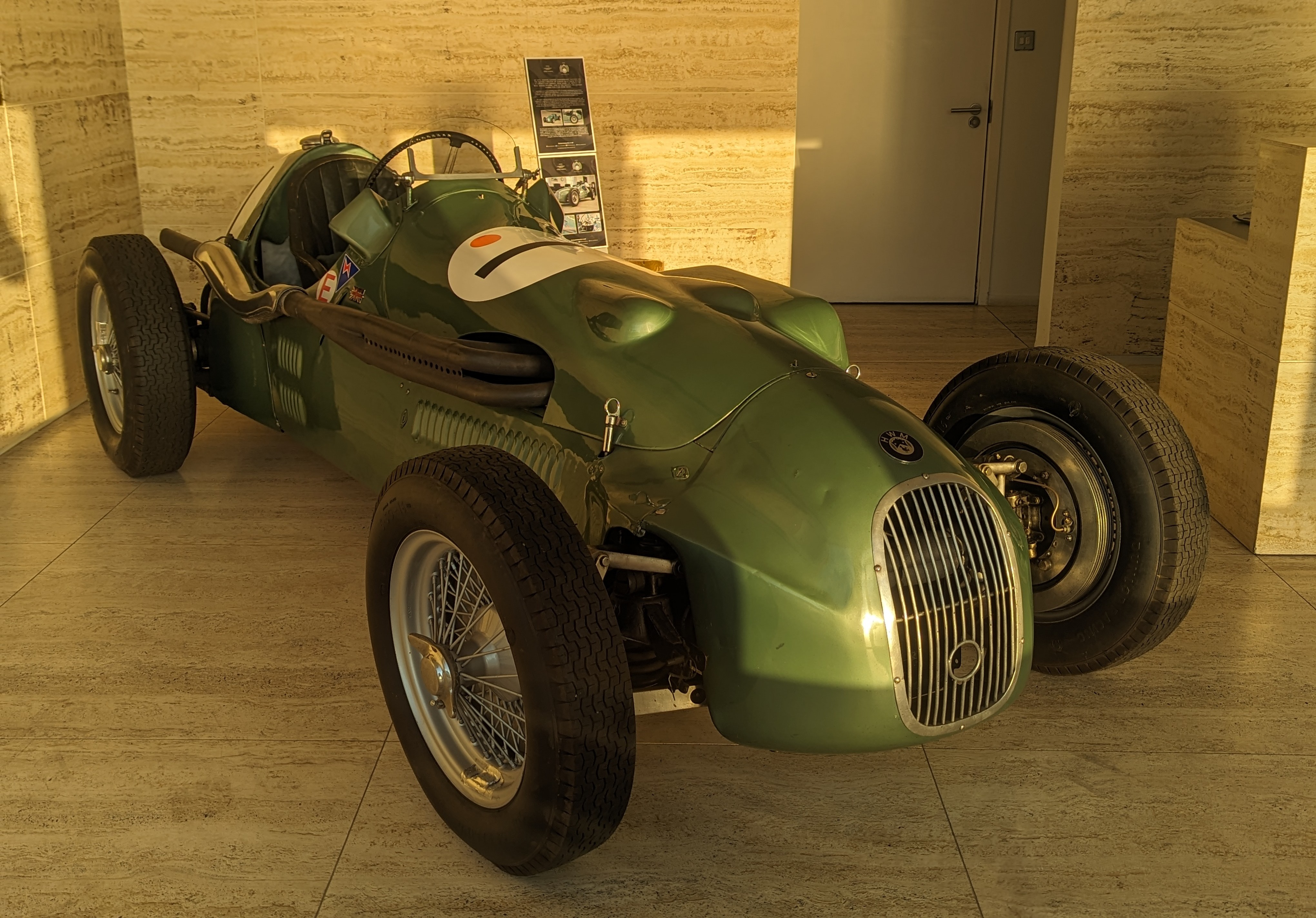
HWM made their debut with the 51, driven by future race winner Stirling Moss.

- Alfa Romeo replaced their full-time driver Luigi Fagioli with Consalvo Sanesi, who had joined the team at the end of 1950. Toulo de Graffenried also drove three races for the team, his only Grands Prix for a works team.
- Ferrari hired Piero Taruffi, who had made his F1 debut with Alfa Romeo at the end of last season, and José Froilán González, coming from a private Maserati team.
- Gordini waited until the fourth race in the calendar to compete. They added André Simon to their line-up.
- Talbot-Lago did not enter their works team for 1951. Three of their drivers decided to each take over a Talbot chassis and race it under their own name.
- Maserati, likewise, did not enter their works team. Driver Louis Chiron moved to Louis Rosier's private Talbot team, while Franco Rol would return later in 1951 with O.S.C.A.
- HWM made their debut with drivers George Abecassis and Stirling Moss. They would only enter the season opener, before returning in 1952.

==== Mid-season changes ====
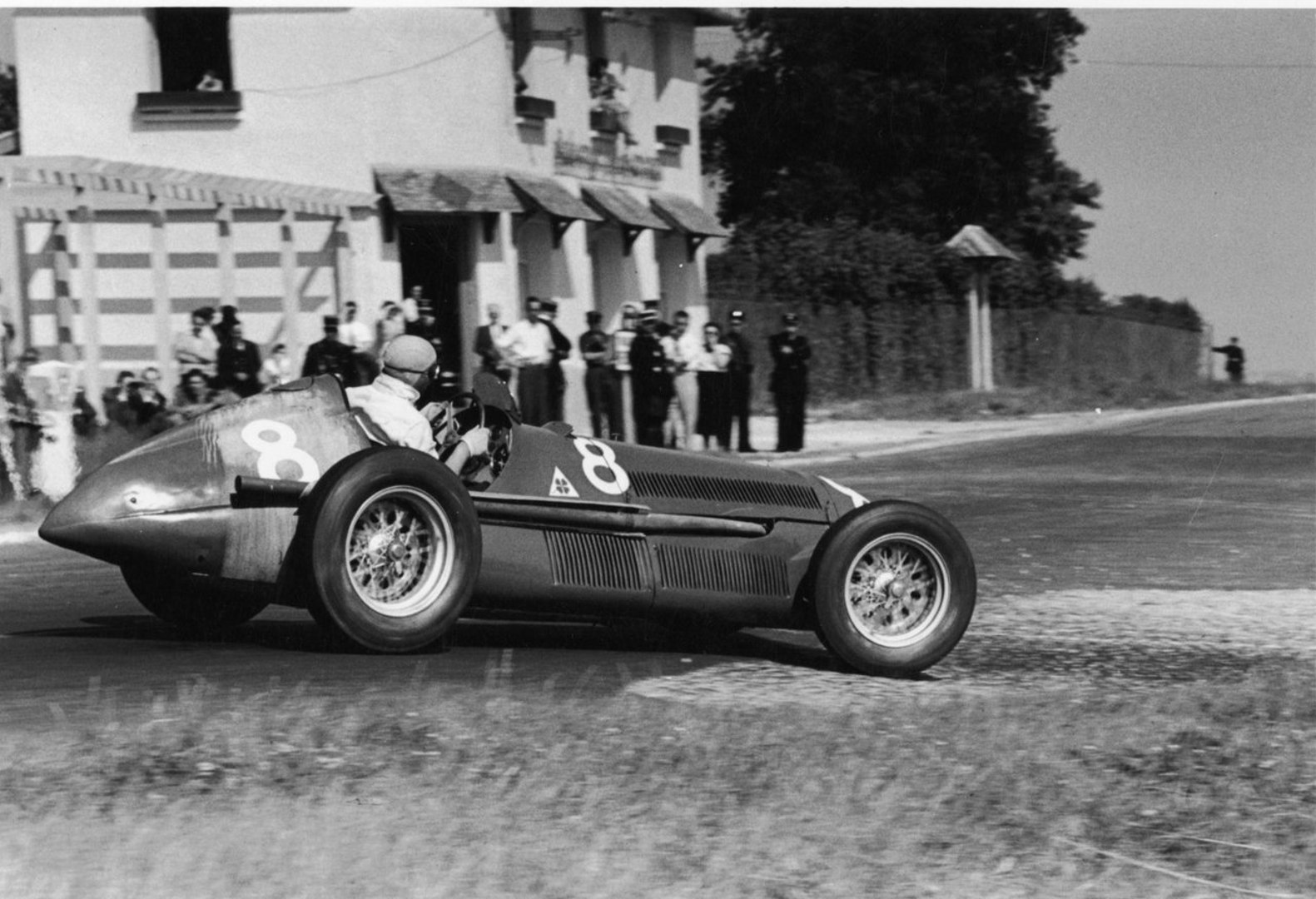
Alfa Romeo driver Luigi Fagioli in his last race, the 1951 French Grand Prix

- Future champions BRM made their debut in the British Grand Prix with Peter Walker and Reg Parnell. It would be their only start, before returning in 1954.
- Luigi Fagioli made his return with Alfa Romeo in the French Grand Prix, in which the team manager ordered him to hand over his car to teammate Juan Manuel Fangio. Fagioli was allegedly so disappointed that he chose to retire from the sport immediately. Felice Bonetto replaced him as Alfa Romeo's third driver, while Consalvo Sanesi left the team.

== Calendar ==
| Round | Grand Prix | Circuit | Date |
|---|---|---|---|
| 1 | Swiss Grand Prix | (Switzerland) Circuit Bremgarten, Bern | 27 May |
| 2 | Indianapolis 500 | (United States) Indianapolis Motor Speedway, Speedway | 30 May (Note: The Indianapolis 500 also counted towards the 1951 AAA Championship Car season, and was run for AAA Championship cars, but was not run to Formula One regulations.) |
| 3 | Belgian Grand Prix | (Belgium) Circuit de Spa-Francorchamps, Stavelot | 17 June |
| 4 | French Grand Prix | (France) Reims-Gueux, Gueux | 1 July |
| 5 | British Grand Prix | (United Kingdom) Silverstone Circuit, Silverstone | 14 July |
| 6 | German Grand Prix | (West Germany) Nürburgring, Nürburg | 29 July |
| 7 | Italian Grand Prix | (Italy) Autodromo Nazionale di Monza, Monza | 16 September |
| 8 | Spanish Grand Prix | (Spain) Pedralbes Circuit, Barcelona | 28 October |

=== Calendar changes ===
- The Monaco Grand Prix was dropped from the calendar due to budgetary concerns and a lack of regulations in the sport.
- The Swiss Grand Prix was moved from June to May to become the season opener.
- The British Grand Prix was moved back from May to July.
- For the first time, the German and Spanish Grand Prix featured on the calendar as championship rounds.

== World Championship season summary ==
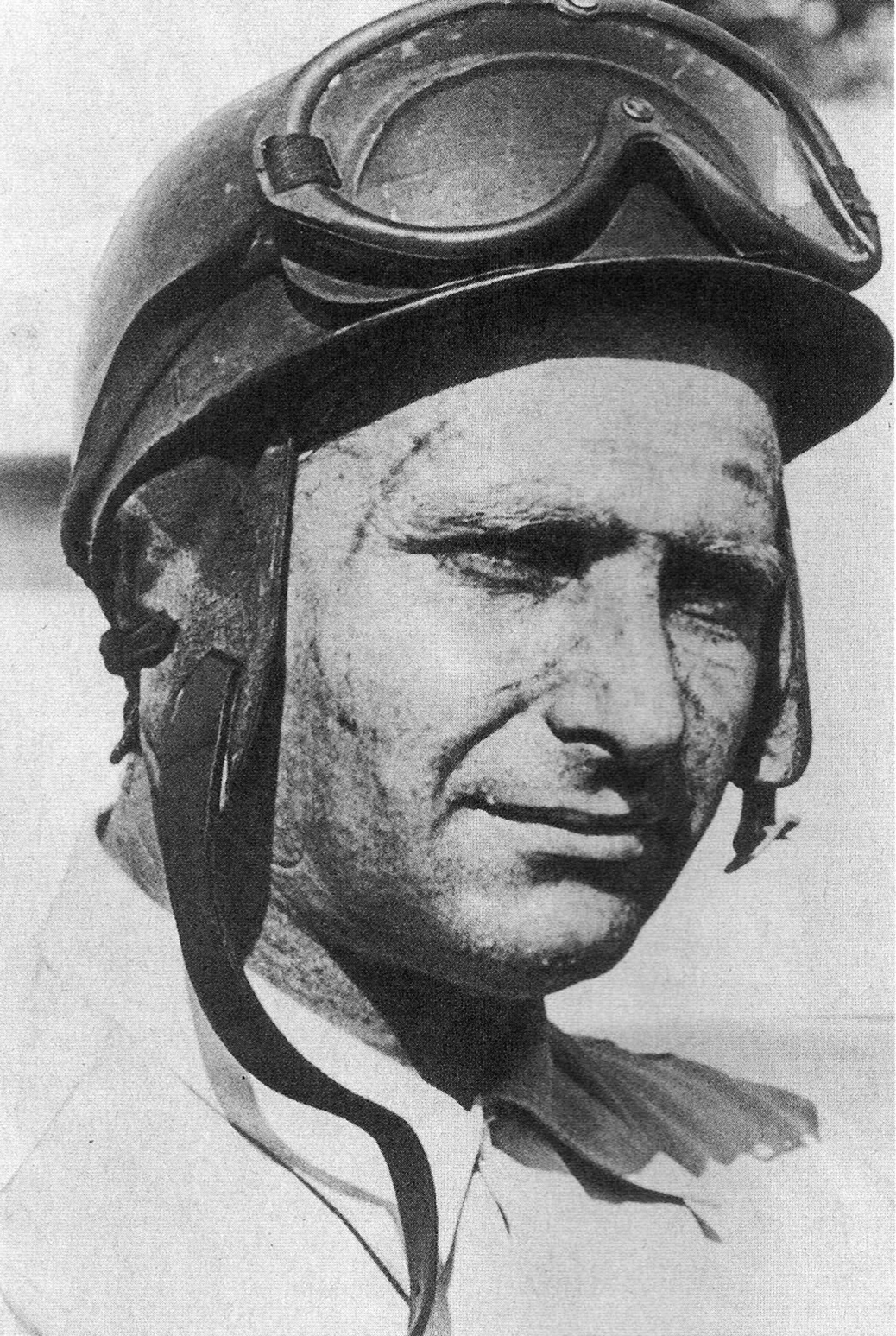
Argentinian Juan Manuel Fangio won the first of his five World Championships in 1951 driving for Alfa Romeo

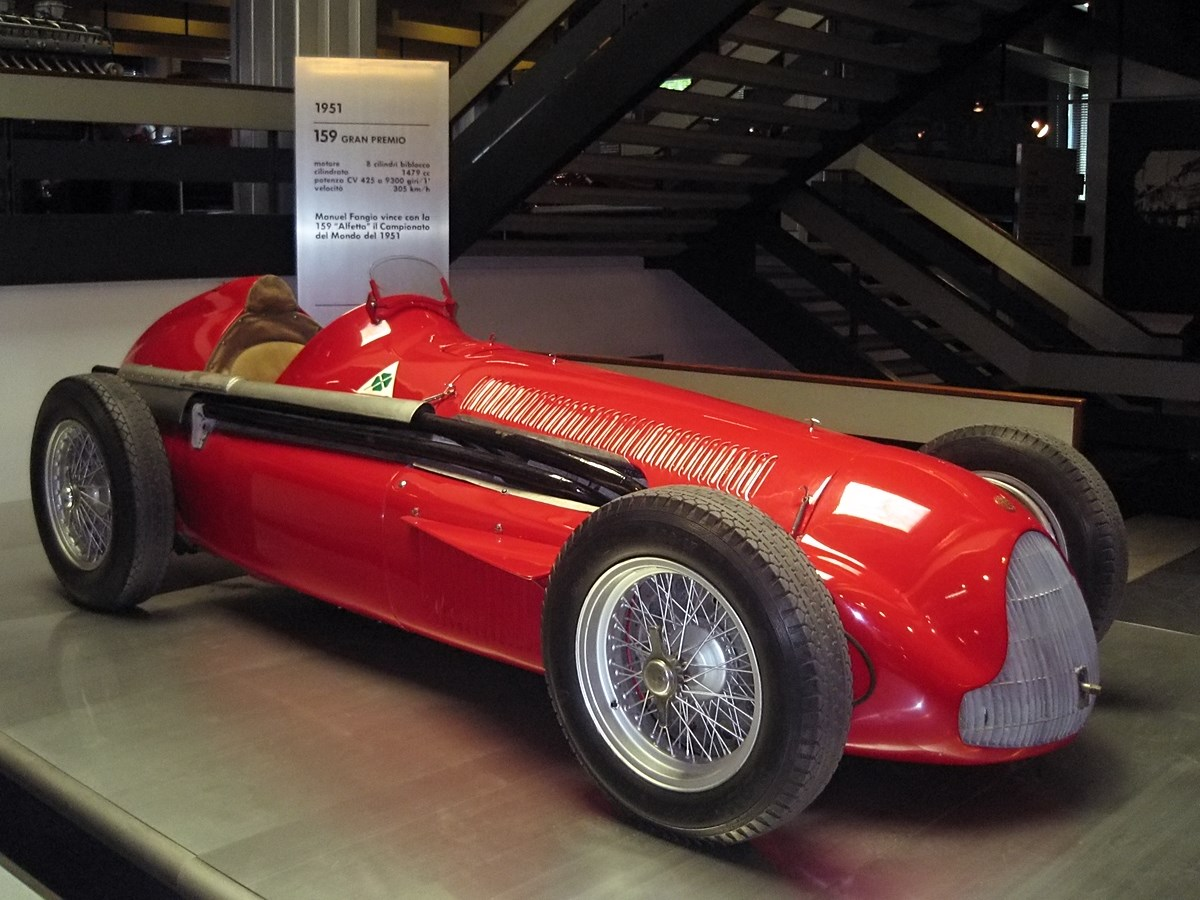
Alfa Romeo won four of the eight World Championship races in 1951 with the Type 159

Ferrari's newer, naturally aspirated 4.5-litre cars offered a real challenge to the Alfas, which were nearing the end of their development potential. The Ferraris were able to capitalize on the inefficiency of the Alfa's very thirsty engines, particularly at Silverstone. Although Alfas won four races, with Fangio taking the championship, Ferrari's three victories spelled the end for the Alfas. BRM made their only championship appearance with the V16 at Silverstone, and the old, slow Talbots were increasingly outclassed.

Points were given to the top 5 finishers (8, 6, 4, 3, 2). One point was given for the fastest lap. Only the best four of eight scores counted towards the world championship. Points for shared drives were divided equally between the drivers, regardless of who had driven more laps.

=== Pre-season non-championship races ===
Although the official championship season would start in late May in Switzerland, a handful of non-championship events were to be run. The first was the first-ever Syracuse Grand Prix near the ancient city of Syracuse on the southern island of Sicily. This race was won by Italian Luigi Villoresi driving the new 4 1/2 litre Ferrari 375 on the 5.5 kilometres (3.4 mi) public road circuit. Villoresi would triumph again two weeks later at Pau in southwest France over homeland hero Louis Rosier and Nino Farina, driving a Maserati for this race. On the same day, Thai driver Birabongse Bhanudej would triumph at the Richmond Trophy race at Goodwood in southern England in his Maserati.

Three weeks after the Goodwood and Pau races, it was the San Remo Grand Prix in western Italy, not far from Monaco. Alberto Ascari made his first appearance of the season and promptly won in a Ferrari 375 on this twisty and demanding 3.4 kilometres (2.1 mi) street circuit, ahead of his countryman Dorino Serafini and Swiss Rudi Fischer, both in Ferraris. A week later was the Bordeaux Grand Prix in western France, and it was won by Rosier in a Talbot, ahead of Fischer and Briton Peter Whitehead in a Ferrari. Besides Farina, this race did not feature any Italians because they were competing in the Mille Miglia.

A week later was the BRDC International Trophy race at Silverstone, with the Alfa Romeos making their first appearance in 1951. Of the first two heats, Fangio won the first while Farina won the second, and Reg Parnell won the final all-important event, which was stopped because of torrential rain and flooding. Two weeks after this was the Paris Grand Prix in the Bois de Boulogne Park in the French capital city, which Farina won in a Maserati.

=== Round 1: Switzerland ===
A week after the BRDC International Trophy race, the Formula One Championship season started in Switzerland at the very dangerous and tree-lined Bremgarten public road circuit near Bern around the time the Monaco Grand Prix would have been held, but that historic race was not held this year. Alfa Romeo, the dominant team in 1950 with its supercharged 159 Alfetta, took the first five places on the grid, except 3rd, which Luigi Villoresi took in a Ferrari. Argentine Juan Manuel Fangio was on pole position, with his Italian teammate Giuseppe "Nino" Farina alongside him. The race started while it was raining, and with its overhanging trees lining the road, this circuit was even more dangerous in the wet. But Fangio made no mistake and won the race from Piero Taruffi in a Ferrari and Farina, whose decision to run the race without changing tires proved wrong.

=== Round 2: Indianapolis 500 ===
The Indianapolis 500 in the United States was run three days after the Swiss Grand Prix on a Wednesday. It was the only non-European championship round and the only round that was not run to FIA Grand Prix regulations. Lee Wallard won this demanding race in his Kurtis Kraft-Offenhauser.

=== Round 3: Belgium ===
Farina won the Ulster Trophy at the Dundrod circuit in Northern Ireland in an Alfa Romeo. The following championship Grand Prix took place at the 14-kilometer (8.7 mi) Spa-Francorchamps circuit in Belgium. Fangio and Farina held the first two positions, while the Ferraris of Villoresi and Alberto Ascari held third and fourth. The race had 13 entries. Farina won the race, finishing ahead of Ascari and Villoresi. Fangio finished in ninth place, four laps behind, due to a mechanical issue with a wheel hub.

=== Round 4: France ===
The French Grand Prix, given the honorary designation of the European Grand Prix this year, was held at the 7.7 kilometres (4.8 mi) Reims-Gueux circuit. Fangio, on pole again, was beaten off the line by 3rd-placed qualifier Ascari, with 2nd-placed qualifier Farina having a poor start and dropping to 11th. About 10 laps into the race, Ascari retired his car with a broken gearbox, and Fangio’s engine developed a misfire. Farina made up for the slow start and eventually took the lead. Argentine José Froilán González was 2nd in a Ferrari, and Italian Luigi Fagioli in an Alfa was 3rd in a one-off appearance this year. Farina's car developed magneto problems and he had to fall back, which put González in the lead, with Fagioli in 2nd. However, during their pitstops, González handed his car over to Ascari, and Fagioli had to exchange his healthy car with Fangio's mechanically unhealthy car (Drivers switching cars was commonplace in Formula One in the 1950s). This meant that Ascari and Fangio were back in 1st and 2nd where they had been before. But Fangio took advantage of Ascari's brake problems on his Ferrari to win a race that holds the record for the longest racing distance ever completed for a Grand Prix at 600 kilometres (370 mi). Fagioli, finishing 22 laps down and furious over having to swap cars with Fangio, quit Grand Prix racing afterwards.

=== Round 5: Britain ===
The British Grand Prix at the Silverstone airfield circuit in England played host to round 5 of the World Championship, and this race was to make history. The Alfa Romeos, with their powerful 420 hp supercharged 1.5L engines were fast but had horrendous fuel consumption: 6.5 km/L per gallon (thanks to the relatively simple pre-World War II engine design), meaning that Fangio and Farina had to stop twice to refuel, José Froilán González in the more fuel-efficient 4.5L naturally aspirated V12 Ferrari went on to win, with Fangio second. This was the first time Enzo Ferrari had won a Grand Prix with a car of his own company's construction, and this team went on to be the most successful in Formula One history.

=== Round 6: Germany ===
A week after the British Grand Prix, the non-championship Dutch Grand Prix at the fast beachside Zandvoort circuit near Amsterdam was won by Louis Rosier in a Talbot, ahead of veteran Phillippe Etancelin and up-and-comer Stirling Moss in an HWM.

West Germany had been banned from international sports competitions until 1951, so the German Grand Prix was able to be a Grand Prix championship round for the first time since 1939. The venue was the same as it had been in 1939 – it was the dauntingly challenging, dangerous, and twisty 22.9 kilometres (14.2 mi) Nürburgring Nordschleife. Ascari took pole position in front of his teammate González and Alfa drivers Fangio and Farina. At the start, Farina took the lead, but the Alfas started to develop overheating problems, and Farina soon retired. In addition to engine problems, the gearbox in Fangio's Alfa lost 1st and 2nd of four gears. After trading the lead with Fangio during pitstops, Ascari took the lead and won his first championship Formula One Grand Prix.

=== Round 7: Italy ===
A week after the German Grand Prix was the Albi Grand Prix on a high-speed and dangerous public road circuit outside the southwestern French village of Albi. Maurice Trintignant won this race in a Simca. Ten days after this race, the Coppa Acerbo at the 25.4 kilometres (15.8 mi) and dauntingly dangerous Pescara Circuit in eastern Italy, which was won by José Froilán González in a Ferrari. Two weeks later, Fangio won the Bari Grand Prix in the small southeastern Italian coastal city.

Italy was the next championship race, and the Monza Autodrome near Milan played host to the seventh round of the Formula One Grand Prix championship. Fangio, in an Alfa, pole position again, but he retired his car, which had engine problems; Farina, who had taken Felice Bonetto's Alfa, had a leaking fuel tank and had to come in twice for fuel, which dropped him down the order far enough for him only to get as far as third. Fellow local hero and Milan native Ascari won again in his Ferrari–which kept his championship hopes alive to catch the leader Fangio going into the last championship Grand Prix in Spain.

=== Round 8: Spain ===
The last non-championship race of the year, the Goodwood Trophy, was won by Farina in an Alfa three weeks after the Italian Grand Prix.

The first ever Formula One Spanish Grand Prix, held at the Pedralbes street circuit in Barcelona, took place four weeks after the Goodwood Trophy race. The Ferrari and Alfa Romeo teams each ran four cars, with Ferrari fielding Ascari, Gigi Villoresi, Froilan González, and Piero Taruffi and Alfa Romeo running Fangio, Giuseppe Farina, Felice Bonetto, and Baron Emanuel de Graffenried. Ascari was fastest in practice and shared the front row of the 4–3–4 grid with Fangio, González, and Farina. Behind them were Villoresi, de Graffenried and Taruffi. Ascari led from the start, with González chasing, but by the end of the first lap, González had dropped to fifth behind Farina, Fangio, and Bonetto. Fangio quickly passed Farina and took the lead from Ascari on the fourth lap. As Fangio sailed away to victory, Ferrari's challenge fell apart along with its tires – the team having opted to use smaller wheels than normal. By the time the team had sorted out the problem, Ascari was two laps behind. Fangio duly won the race and his first of five championships, with González finishing second and Farina third.

== Results and standings ==
=== Grands Prix ===
| Round | Grand Prix | Pole position | Fastest lap | Winning driver | Winning constructor | Tyre | Report |
|---|---|---|---|---|---|---|---|
| 1 | (Switzerland) Swiss Grand Prix | (Argentina) Juan Manuel Fangio | (Argentina) Juan Manuel Fangio | (Argentina) Juan Manuel Fangio | (Italy) Alfa Romeo | P | Report |
| 2 | (United States) Indianapolis 500 | (United States) Duke Nalon | (United States) Lee Wallard | (United States) Lee Wallard | (United States) Kurtis Kraft-Offenhauser | F | Report |
| 3 | (Belgium) Belgian Grand Prix | (Argentina) Juan Manuel Fangio | (Argentina) Juan Manuel Fangio | (Italy) Giuseppe Farina | (Italy) Alfa Romeo | P | Report |
| 4 | (France) French Grand Prix | (Argentina) Juan Manuel Fangio | (Argentina) Juan Manuel Fangio | (Argentina) Juan Manuel Fangio (Italy) Luigi Fagioli | (Italy) Alfa Romeo | P | Report |
| 5 | (United Kingdom) British Grand Prix | (Argentina) José Froilán González | (Italy) Giuseppe Farina | (Argentina) José Froilán González | (Italy) Ferrari | P | Report |
| 6 | (West Germany) German Grand Prix | (Italy) Alberto Ascari | (Argentina) Juan Manuel Fangio | (Italy) Alberto Ascari | (Italy) Ferrari | P | Report |
| 7 | (Italy) Italian Grand Prix | (Argentina) Juan Manuel Fangio | (Italy) Giuseppe Farina | (Italy) Alberto Ascari | (Italy) Ferrari | P | Report |
| 8 | (Spain) Spanish Grand Prix | (Italy) Alberto Ascari | (Argentina) Juan Manuel Fangio | (Argentina) Juan Manuel Fangio | (Italy) Alfa Romeo | P | Report |

=== Scoring system ===
Points were awarded to the top five classified finishers, with an additional point awarded for setting the fastest lap, regardless of finishing position or even classification. Only the best four results counted towards the championship. Shared drives result in half points for each driver if they finished in a points-scoring position. If more than one driver set the same fastest lap time, the fastest lap point would be divided equally between the drivers. Numbers without parentheses are championship points; numbers in parentheses are total points scored. Points were awarded in the following system:

| Position | 1st | 2nd | 3rd | 4th | 5th | FL |
|---|---|---|---|---|---|---|
| Race | 8 | 6 | 4 | 3 | 2 | 1 |

=== World Championship of Drivers standings ===
| Pos. | Driver | SUI (Switzerland) | 500 (United States) | BEL (Belgium) | FRA (France) | GBR (United Kingdom) | GER (West Germany) | ITA (Italy) | ESP (Spain) | Pts. |
|---|---|---|---|---|---|---|---|---|---|---|
| 1 | (Argentina) Juan Manuel Fangio | 1^{P}^{F} | | (9^{P}^{F}) | (1^{F})†/11^{P}† | 2 | 2^{F} | Ret^{P} | 1^{F} | 31 (37) |
| 2 | (Italy) Alberto Ascari | 6 | | 2 | 2†/ Ret | Ret | 1^{P} | 1 | (4^{P}) | 25 (28) |
| 3 | (Argentina) José Froilán González | Ret | | | (2)† | 1^{P} | 3 | 2 | 2 | 24 (27) |
| 4 | (Italy) Giuseppe Farina | 3 | | 1 | (5) | (Ret^{F}) | Ret | 3^{F}†/ Ret | 3 | 19 (22) |
| 5 | (Italy) Luigi Villoresi | Ret | | 3 | 3 | 3 | 4 | (4) | Ret | 15 (18) |
| 6 | (Italy) Piero Taruffi | 2 | | Ret | | | 5 | 5 | Ret | 10 |
| 7 | (United States) Lee Wallard | | 1^{F} | | | | | | | 9 |
| 8 | (Italy) Felice Bonetto | | | | | 4 | Ret | 3† | 5 | 7 |
| 9 | (United States) Mike Nazaruk | | 2 | | | | | | | 6 |
| 10 | (United Kingdom) Reg Parnell | | | | 4 | 5 | | DNS | | 5 |
| 11 | (Italy) Luigi Fagioli | | | | 1† / 11† | | | | | 4 |
| 12 | (Italy) Consalvo Sanesi | 4 | | Ret | 10 | 6 | | | | 3 |
| 13 | (France) Louis Rosier | 9 | | 4 | Ret | 10 | 8 | 7 | 7 | 3 |
| 14 | (United States) Andy Linden | | 4 | | | | | | | 3 |
| 15 | (United States) Manny Ayulo | | 3† | | | | | | | 2 |
| 16 | (United States) Jack McGrath | | 3† | | | | | | | 2 |
| 17 | (Switzerland) Toulo de Graffenried | 5 | | | Ret | | Ret | Ret | 6 | 2 |
| 18 | (France) Yves Giraud-Cabantous | Ret | | 5 | 7 | | Ret | 8 | Ret | 2 |
| 19 | (United States) Bobby Ball | | 5 | | | | | | | 2 |
| — | (Monaco) Louis Chiron | 7 | | Ret | 6 | Ret | Ret | Ret | Ret | 0 |
| — | (Switzerland) Rudi Fischer | 11 | | | | | 6 | DNS | | 0 |
| — | (France) André Simon | | | | Ret | | Ret | 6 | Ret | 0 |
| — | (United States) Henry Banks | | 6 | | | | | | | 0 |
| — | (Belgium) André Pilette | | | 6 | | | | | | 0 |
| — | (France) Robert Manzon | | | | Ret | | 7 | Ret | 9 | 0 |
| — | (Belgium) Johnny Claes | 13 | | 7 | Ret | 13 | 11 | Ret | Ret | 0 |
| — | (United States) Carl Forberg | | 7 | | | | | | | 0 |
| — | (United Kingdom) Peter Walker | | | | | 7 | | | | 0 |
| — | (France) Pierre Levegh | | | 8 | | | 9 | Ret | | 0 |
| — | (France) Philippe Étancelin | 10 | | Ret | Ret | | Ret | | 8 | 0 |
| — | (United Kingdom) Stirling Moss | 8 | | | | | | | | 0 |
| — | (United States) Duane Carter | | 8 | | | | | | | 0 |
| — | (France) Eugène Chaboud | | | | 8 | | | | | 0 |
| — | (United Kingdom) Brian Shawe-Taylor | | | | | 8 | | | | 0 |
| — | (France) Guy Mairesse | 14 | | | 9 | | | | | 0 |
| — | (United Kingdom) Peter Whitehead | Ret | | | Ret | 9 | | Ret | | 0 |
| — | (Italy) Franco Rol | | | | | | | 9 | | 0 |
| — | (Belgium) Jacques Swaters | | | | | | 10 | Ret | | 0 |
| — | (Spain) Paco Godia | | | | | | | | 10 | 0 |
| — | (United Kingdom) Bob Gerard | | | | | 11 | | | | 0 |
| — | (United States) Harry Schell | 12 | | | Ret | | | | | 0 |
| — | (United Kingdom) Duncan Hamilton | | | | | 12 | Ret | | | 0 |
| — | (Republic of Ireland) Joe Kelly | | | | | NC | | | | 0 |
| — | (France) Maurice Trintignant | | | | Ret | | Ret | DNS | Ret | 0 |
| — | (France) Henri Louveau | Ret | | | | | | | | 0 |
| — | (United Kingdom) George Abecassis | Ret | | | | | | | | 0 |
| — | (Switzerland) Peter Hirt | Ret | | | | | | | | 0 |
| — | (United States) Tony Bettenhausen | | Ret | | | | | | | 0 |
| — | (United States) Duke Nalon | | Ret^{P} | | | | | | | 0 |
| — | (United States) Gene Force | | Ret | | | | | | | 0 |
| — | (United States) Sam Hanks | | Ret | | | | | | | 0 |
| — | (United States) Bill Schindler | | Ret | | | | | | | 0 |
| — | (United States) Mauri Rose | | Ret | | | | | | | 0 |
| — | (United States) Walt Faulkner | | Ret | | | | | | | 0 |
| — | (United States) Jimmy Davies | | Ret | | | | | | | 0 |
| — | (United States) Fred Agabashian | | Ret | | | | | | | 0 |
| — | (United States) Carl Scarborough | | Ret | | | | | | | 0 |
| — | (United States) Bill Mackey | | Ret | | | | | | | 0 |
| — | (United States) Chuck Stevenson | | Ret | | | | | | | 0 |
| — | (United States) Johnnie Parsons | | Ret | | | | | | | 0 |
| — | (United States) Cecil Green | | Ret | | | | | | | 0 |
| — | (United States) Troy Ruttman | | Ret | | | | | | | 0 |
| — | (United States) Duke Dinsmore | | Ret | | | | | | | 0 |
| — | (United States) Chet Miller | | Ret | | | | | | | 0 |
| — | (United States) Walt Brown | | Ret | | | | | | | 0 |
| — | (United States) Rodger Ward | | Ret | | | | | | | 0 |
| — | (United States) Cliff Griffith | | Ret | | | | | | | 0 |
| — | (United States) Bill Vukovich | | Ret | | | | | | | 0 |
| — | (United States) George Connor | | Ret | | | | | | | 0 |
| — | (United States) Mack Hellings | | Ret | | | | | | | 0 |
| — | (United States) Joe James | | Ret | | | | | | | 0 |
| — | (United States) Johnny McDowell | | Ret | | | | | | | 0 |
| — | (France) Aldo Gordini | | | | Ret | | | | | 0 |
| — | (Argentina) Onofre Marimón | | | | Ret | | | | | 0 |
| — | (United Kingdom) Philip Fotheringham-Parker | | | | | Ret | | | | 0 |
| — | (United Kingdom) David Murray | | | | | Ret | | | | 0 |
| — | (United Kingdom) John James | | | | | Ret | | | | 0 |
| — | (West Germany) Paul Pietsch | | | | | | Ret | | | 0 |
| — | (Switzerland) Toni Branca | | | | | | Ret | | | 0 |
| — | (France) Jean Behra | | | | | | | Ret | | 0 |
| — | (Brazil) Chico Landi | | | | | | | Ret | | 0 |
| — | (France) Georges Grignard | | | | | | | | Ret | 0 |
| — | (Thailand) Birabongse Bhanudej | | | | | | | | Ret | 0 |
| — | (United Kingdom) Ken Richardson | | | | | | | DNS | | 0 |
| — | (Spain) Juan Jover | | | | | | | | DNS | 0 |
| Pos. | Driver | SUI (Switzerland) | 500 (United States) | BEL (Belgium) | FRA (France) | GBR (United Kingdom) | GER (West Germany) | ITA (Italy) | ESP (Spain) | Pts. |

Key
| Colour | Result |
|---|---|
| Gold | Winner |
| Silver | Second place |
| Bronze | Third place |
| Green | Other points position |
| Blue | Other classified position |
| Blue | Not classified, finished (NC) |
| Purple | Not classified, retired (Ret) |
| Red | Did not qualify (DNQ) |
| Black | Disqualified (DSQ) |
| White | Did not start (DNS) |
| White | Race cancelled (C) |
| Blank | Did not practice (DNP) |
| Blank | Excluded (EX) |
| Blank | Did not arrive (DNA) |
| Blank | Withdrawn (WD) |
| Blank | Did not enter (empty cell) |
| Annotation | Meaning |
| P | Pole position |
| F | Fastest lap |

- † Position shared between two or more drivers of the same car

== Non-championship races ==
Other Formula One races, which did not count towards the World Championship, were also held in 1951.

| Race name | Circuit | Date | Winning driver | Constructor | Report |
|---|---|---|---|---|---|
| (Italy) I Gran Premio di Siracusa | Syracuse | 11 March | (Italy) Luigi Villoresi | (Italy) Ferrari | Report |
| (France) XII Pau Grand Prix | Pau | 26 March | (Italy) Luigi Villoresi | (Italy) Ferrari | Report |
| (United Kingdom) III Richmond Trophy | Goodwood | 26 March | (Thailand) Birabongse Bhanudej | (Italy) Maserati | Report |
| (Italy) VI Gran Premio di Sanremo | Ospedaletti | 22 April | (Italy) Alberto Ascari | (Italy) Ferrari | Report |
| (France) I Grand Prix de Bordeaux | Bordeaux | 29 April | (France) Louis Rosier | (France) Talbot-Lago | Report |
| (United Kingdom) III BRDC International Trophy | Silverstone | 5 May | (United Kingdom) Reg Parnell | (Italy) Ferrari | Report |
| (France) V Grand Prix de Paris | Bois de Boulogne | 20 May | (Italy) Giuseppe Farina | (Italy) Maserati | Report |
| (United Kingdom) V Ulster Trophy | Dundrod | 2 June | (Italy) Giuseppe Farina | (Italy) Alfa Romeo | Report |
| (Scotland) I Scottish Grand Prix | Winfield | 21 July | (United Kingdom) Philip Fotheringham-Parker | (Italy) Maserati | Report |
| (Netherlands) II Grote Prijs van Nederland | Zandvoort | 22 July | (France) Louis Rosier | (France) Talbot-Lago | Report |
| (France) XIII Grand Prix de l'Albigeois | Albi (Les Planques) | 5 August | (France) Maurice Trintignant | (France) Simca-Gordini | Report |
| (Italy) XX Circuito di Pescara | Pescara | 15 August | (Argentina) José Froilán González | (Italy) Ferrari | Report |
| (Italy) V Gran Premio di Bari | Bari | 2 September | (Argentina) Juan Manuel Fangio | (Italy) Alfa Romeo | Report |
| (United Kingdom) IV Goodwood Trophy | Goodwood | 29 September | (Italy) Giuseppe Farina | (Italy) Alfa Romeo | Report |
