= John James (racing driver) =

British racing driver (1914–2002)

- Born: 10 May 1914; Packwood, Warwickshire
- Died: 27 January 2002 (aged 87); St. Julian's, Malta

Formula One World Championship career
- Nationality: (United Kingdom) British
- Active years: 1951
- Team: privateer Maserati
- Entries: 1
- Championships: 0
- Wins: 0
- Podiums: 0
- Career points: 0
- Pole positions: 0
- Fastest laps: 0
- First entry: 1951 British Grand Prix

John Martin James (10 May 1914 – 27 January 2002) was a British racing driver from England. He competed in one Formula One World Championship Grand Prix. James was an engineer who acquired a Maserati 4CLT/48, and entered the 1951 British Grand Prix, retiring from a damaged radiator after 23 laps. Regulation changes for 1952 limited his Maserati to competing in Formula Libre only, and he competed in several sprint races before retiring from racing.

== Complete Formula One World Championship results ==
(key)

Year	Entrant	Chassis	Engine	1	2	3	4	5	6	7	8	WDC	Points
1951	John James	Maserati 4CLT/48	Maserati S6	SUI	500	BEL	FRA	GBR; Ret	GER	ITA	ESP	NC	0
