= 1951 British Grand Prix =

Formula One motor race held at Silverstone Circuit, Northamptonshire, England

← Previous race	Next race →
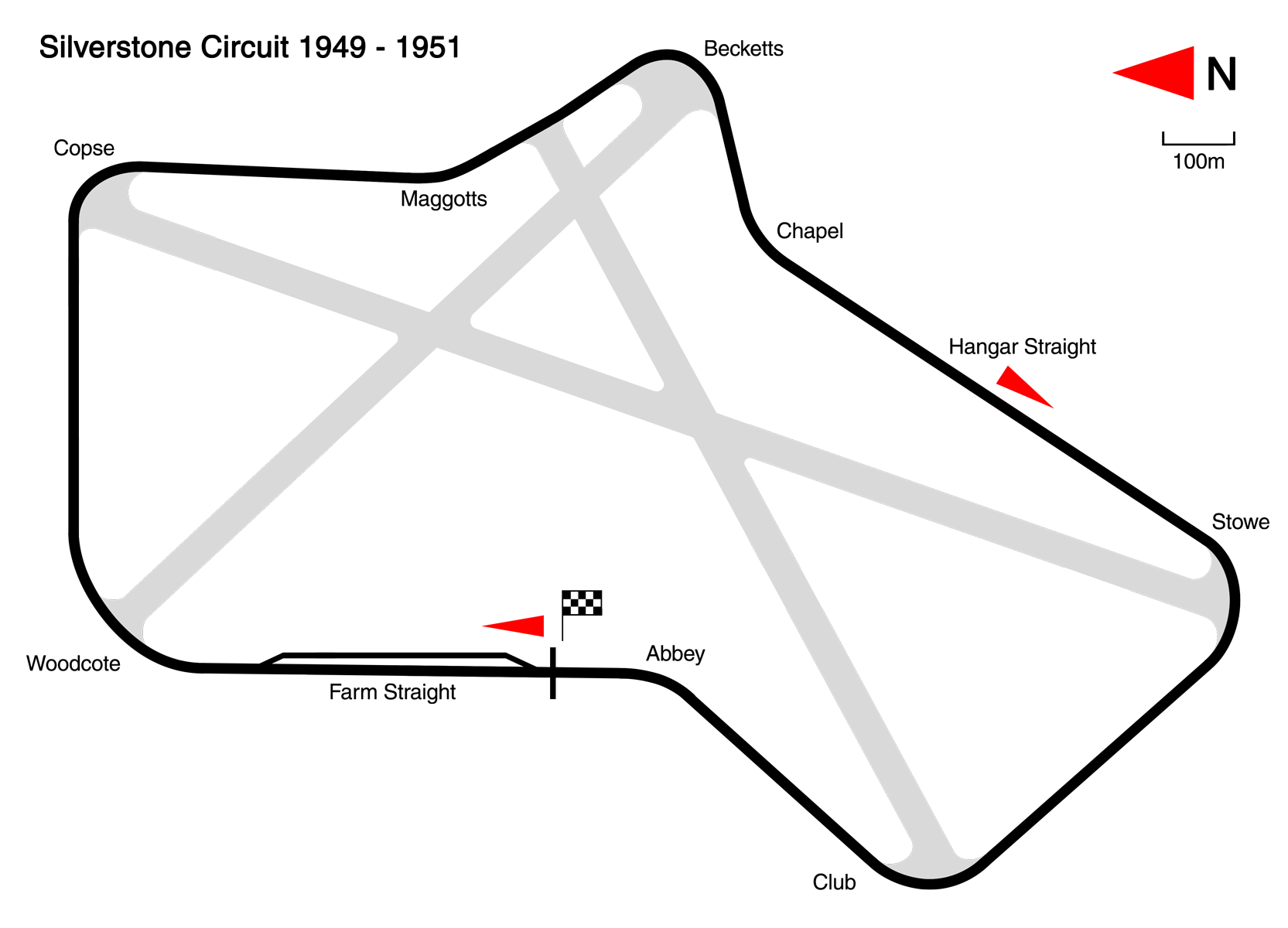
- Silverstone Circuit in 1950–1951 configuration

Race details
- Date: 14 July 1951
- Official name: IV RAC British Grand Prix
- Location: Silverstone Circuit; Silverstone, England
- Course: Permanent racing facility
- Course length: 4.649 km (2.888 miles)
- Distance: 90 laps, 408.410 km (253.774 miles)
- Weather: Mild, Dry

Pole position
Driver	(Argentina) José Froilán González	Ferrari
- Time: 1:43.4

Fastest lap
Driver	(Italy) Nino Farina	Alfa Romeo
- Time: 1:44.0 on lap 38

Podium
First	(Argentina) José Froilán González	Ferrari
Second	(Argentina) Juan Manuel Fangio	Alfa Romeo
Third	(Italy) Luigi Villoresi	Ferrari

The 1951 British Grand Prix was a Formula One motor race held on 14 July 1951 at the Silverstone Circuit in Northamptonshire, England. It was race 5 of 8 in the 1951 World Championship of Drivers and was contested over 90 laps. The race was the first victory for José Froilán González, and was also the first of many for the Scuderia Ferrari team. Both the team and driver also achieved their first ever pole position during the weekend.

== Report ==
José Froilán González was one second quicker than Juan Manuel Fangio in qualifying, achieving the first pole position of his career. It was also the first pole position for the Ferrari team, and the first in the World Championship (excluding the Indy 500 races) not scored by an Alfa Romeo. Nino Farina and Alberto Ascari qualified in third and fourth positions, completing the front row.

González and Fangio shot away almost parallel from the front row of the grid, closely followed by the other Alfa Romeos and Ferraris. Alfa Romeo driver Felice Bonetto, who started in seventh position, was the first man at the first corner, with the Ferrari of González in second position. González took the lead from Bonetto on the second lap with Fangio chasing. The BRM cars of Reg Parnell and Peter Walker were in hot pursuit of the leaders. The team had arrived at the last minute, and had not practiced or even qualified for their debut race, and had started in 19th and 20th positions. Bonetto's Alfa Romeo teammates of Fangio and reigning World Champion, Nino Farina, managed to overtake him to move into second and third places. On lap 6, Fangio began to close in on González; he passed him on the straight on lap 10, and slowly began to draw away. Consalvo Sanesi then pulled into the pits for fuel and new tyres.

The Maserati of John James became the first retirement of the race on lap 23 with a radiator problem, but was soon joined on the sidelines by Louis Chiron, both his Maserati teammates, the Ferrari of Alberto Ascari and Farina. Farina pulled up at Abbey curve after 75 laps with a slipping clutch and his engine on fire. He had set the lap record on lap 38, with a time of 1 minute 44 seconds, an average speed of 100.0003981 mph,(some sources state 99.997382 mph) ensuring he still left the weekend with one point. González retook the lead on lap 39 with an overtake at Becketts corner. He kept his lead for the remainder of the race (excluding one lap when he pitted just before Fangio did) extending it to 1 minute and 5 seconds with 5 laps to go, before easing off at the end of the race. The BRM drivers of Parnell and Walker were still battling on, despite the fact they were suffering from hand and feet burns, and would eventually finish fifth and seventh respectively.

The Alfa Romeos of Fangio and Farina pitted twice for fuel, owing to the awful fuel consumption of their cars. They were doing 1 1/16 miles to the gallon, and needed to take on 90 gallons for every stop. Both drivers needed to stop twice, and, owing to the lengthy, minutes-long pit stops of Formula One in 1951, the more fuel efficient Ferrari of González (who only needed to make one stop) was able to overtake the Alfa Romeos and pull out a considerable lead.

González eventually took his own and Ferrari's first victory in a World Championship race by 51 seconds. It was the first World Championship race (excluding the Indy 500) that was not won by an Alfa Romeo. An Alfa Romeo was still in second place though, in the form of the year's eventual champion Fangio. Luigi Villoresi became the second Ferrari on the podium after he finished in third place, two laps behind. Bonetto and Parnell were the other two-point scorers at the race, finishing in fourth and fifth positions respectively.

As it turned out, González had actually raced with an older chassis and engine than his teammates, Villoresi and Ascari.

== Entries ==
No	Driver	Entrant	Constructor	Chassis	Engine	Tyre
1	(Italy) Nino Farina	Alfa Romeo SpA	Alfa Romeo	Alfa Romeo 159B	Alfa Romeo 1.5 L8 s	P
2	(Argentina) Juan Manuel Fangio	Alfa Romeo SpA	Alfa Romeo	Alfa Romeo 159B	Alfa Romeo 1.5 L8 s	P
3	(Italy) Consalvo Sanesi	Alfa Romeo SpA	Alfa Romeo	Alfa Romeo 159B	Alfa Romeo 1.5 L8 s	P
4	(Italy) Felice Bonetto	Alfa Romeo SpA	Alfa Romeo	Alfa Romeo 159A	Alfa Romeo 1.5 L8 s	P
5	(Republic of Ireland) Joe Kelly	Joe Kelly	Alta	Alta GP	Alta 1.5 L4 s	D
6	(United Kingdom) Reg Parnell	BRM Ltd.	BRM	BRM P15	BRM 15 1.5 V16 s	D
7	(United Kingdom) Peter Walker	BRM Ltd.	BRM	BRM P15	BRM 15 1.5 V16 s	D
8	(United Kingdom) Bob Gerard	Bob Gerard	ERA	ERA B	ERA 1.5 L6 s	D
9	(United Kingdom) Brian Shawe-Taylor	Brian Shawe-Taylor	ERA	ERA B/C	ERA 1.5 L6 s	D
10	(Italy) Luigi Villoresi	Scuderia Ferrari	Ferrari	Ferrari 375	Ferrari Type 375 4.5 V12	P
11	(Italy) Alberto Ascari	Scuderia Ferrari	Ferrari	Ferrari 375	Ferrari Type 375 4.5 V12	P
12	(Argentina) José Froilán González	Scuderia Ferrari	Ferrari	Ferrari 375	Ferrari Type 375 4.5 V12	P
14	(United Kingdom) Peter Whitehead	G. A. Vandervell	Ferrari	Ferrari 375 tw	Ferrari Type 375 4.5 V12	P
15	(United Kingdom) David Murray	Scuderia Ambrosiana	Maserati	Maserati 4CLT-48	Maserati 4 CL 1.5 L4 s	D
16	(United Kingdom) John James	John James	Maserati	Maserati 4CLT-48	Maserati 4 CL 1.5 L4 s	D
17	(United Kingdom) Philip Fotheringham-Parker	Philip Fotheringham-Parker	Maserati	Maserati 4CL	Maserati 4 CL 1.5 L4 s	D
18	(United Kingdom) Duncan Hamilton	Duncan Hamilton	Talbot-Lago	Talbot-Lago T26C	Talbot 23CV 4.5 L6	D
19	(France) Maurice Trintignant^{1}	Equipe Gordini	Simca-Gordini	Simca-Gordini T15	Simca-Gordini 15C 1.5 L4 s	E
20	(France) Robert Manzon^{1}	Equipe Gordini	Simca-Gordini	Simca-Gordini T15	Simca-Gordini 15C 1.5 L4 s	E
21	(France) André Simon^{1}	Equipe Gordini	Simca-Gordini	Simca-Gordini T15	Simca-Gordini 15C 1.5 L4 s	E
22	(France) Louis Rosier	Ecurie Rosier	Talbot-Lago	Talbot-Lago T26C-DA	Talbot 23CV 4.5 L6	D
23	(Monaco) Louis Chiron	Ecurie Rosier	Talbot-Lago	Talbot-Lago T26C	Talbot 23CV 4.5 L6	D
24	(France) Philippe Étancelin^{1}	Philippe Étancelin	Talbot-Lago	Talbot-Lago T26C-DA	Talbot 23CV 4.5 L6	D
25	(Belgium) Johnny Claes	Ecurie Belge	Talbot-Lago	Talbot-Lago T26C-DA	Talbot 23CV 4.5 L6	D

^1 – Maurice Trintignant, Robert Manzon, André Simon and Philippe Étancelin all withdrew from the event prior to practice.

== Classification ==
=== Qualifying ===
Pos	No	Driver	Constructor	Time
1	12	(Argentina) José Froilán González	Ferrari	1:43.4
2	2	(Argentina) Juan Manuel Fangio	Alfa Romeo	1:44.4
3	1	(Italy) Nino Farina	Alfa Romeo	1:45.0
4	11	(Italy) Alberto Ascari	Ferrari	1:45.4
5	10	(Italy) Luigi Villoresi	Ferrari	1:45.8
6	3	(Italy) Consalvo Sanesi	Alfa Romeo	1:50.2
7	4	(Italy) Felice Bonetto	Alfa Romeo	1:52.0
8	14	(United Kingdom) Peter Whitehead	Ferrari	1:54.6
9	22	(France) Louis Rosier	Talbot-Lago-Talbot	1:56.0
10	8	(United Kingdom) Bob Gerard	ERA	1:57.0
11	18	(United Kingdom) Duncan Hamilton	Talbot-Lago-Talbot	1:57.2
12	9	(United Kingdom) Brian Shawe-Taylor	ERA	1:58.2
13	23	(Monaco) Louis Chiron	Talbot-Lago-Talbot	2:00.2
14	25	(Belgium) Johnny Claes	Talbot-Lago-Talbot	2:05.8
15	15	(United Kingdom) David Murray	Maserati	2:06.0
16	17	(United Kingdom) Philip Fotheringham-Parker	Maserati	2:13.2
17	16	(United Kingdom) John James	Maserati	2:17.0
18	5	(Republic of Ireland) Joe Kelly	Alta	2:18.4
19	7	(United Kingdom) Peter Walker	BRM	No time
20	6	(United Kingdom) Reg Parnell	BRM	No time
DNA	19	(France) Maurice Trintignant	Simca-Gordini	–
DNA	20	(France) Robert Manzon	Simca-Gordini	–
DNA	21	(France) André Simon	Simca-Gordini	–
DNA	24	(France) Philippe Étancelin	Talbot-Lago-Talbot	–

=== Race ===
Pos	No	Driver	Constructor	Laps	Time/retired	Grid	Points
1	12	(Argentina) José Froilán González	Ferrari	90	2:42:18.2	1	8
2	2	(Argentina) Juan Manuel Fangio	Alfa Romeo	90	+51.0	2	6
3	10	(Italy) Luigi Villoresi	Ferrari	88	+2 laps	5	4
4	4	(Italy) Felice Bonetto	Alfa Romeo	87	+3 laps	7	3
5	6	(United Kingdom) Reg Parnell	BRM	85	+5 laps	20	2
6	3	(Italy) Consalvo Sanesi	Alfa Romeo	84	+6 laps	6	
7	7	(United Kingdom) Peter Walker	BRM	84	+6 laps	19	
8	9	(United Kingdom) Brian Shawe-Taylor	ERA	84	+6 laps	12	
9	14	(United Kingdom) Peter Whitehead	Ferrari	83	+7 laps	8	
10	22	(France) Louis Rosier	Talbot-Lago-Talbot	83	+7 laps	9	
11	8	(United Kingdom) Bob Gerard	ERA	82	+8 laps	10	
12	18	(United Kingdom) Duncan Hamilton	Talbot-Lago-Talbot	81	+9 laps	11	
13	25	(Belgium) Johnny Claes	Talbot-Lago-Talbot	80	+10 laps	14	
Ret	1	(Italy) Nino Farina	Alfa Romeo	75	Clutch	3	1^{1}
NC	5	(Republic of Ireland) Joe Kelly	Alta	75	Not classified	18	
Ret	11	(Italy) Alberto Ascari	Ferrari	56	Gearbox	4	
Ret	17	(United Kingdom) Philip Fotheringham-Parker	Maserati	46	Oil leak	16	
Ret	15	(United Kingdom) David Murray	Maserati	45	Engine	15	
Ret	23	(Monaco) Louis Chiron	Talbot-Lago-Talbot	41	Brakes	13	
Ret	16	(United Kingdom) John James	Maserati	23	Radiator	17	

Notes

- ^1 – 1 point for fastest lap

== Championship standings after the race ==
Drivers' Championship standings

	Pos	Driver	Points
	1	(Argentina) Juan Manuel Fangio	21
	2	(Italy) Nino Farina	15
2	3	(Italy) Luigi Villoresi	12
5	4	(Argentina) José Froilán González	11
2	5	(United States) Lee Wallard	9

- Note: Only the top five positions are listed. Only the best 4 results counted towards the Championship.

Previous race: 1951 French Grand Prix	FIA Formula One World Championship; 1951 season	Next race: 1951 German Grand Prix
Previous race: 1950 British Grand Prix	British Grand Prix	Next race: 1952 British Grand Prix
