= 1953 Winfield JC Formula 2 Race =

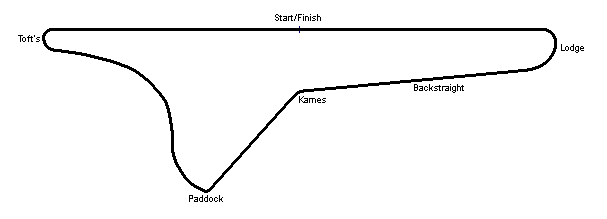

Race details
- Date: 23 May 1953
- Official name: I Winfield Junior Club Formula 2 Race
- Location: Charterhall, Berwickshire, UK
- Course: Airfield circuit
- Course length: 3.218 km (2.000 mi)
- Distance: 20 laps, 64.360 km (39.991 mi)

Pole position
Driver	(United Kingdom) Jimmy Stewart	Cooper-Bristol

Podium
First	(United Kingdom) Ken Wharton	Cooper-Bristol
Second	(United Kingdom) Bobbie Baird	Ferrari
Third	(United Kingdom) Jimmy Stewart	Cooper-Bristol

The 1st Winfield Junior Club Formula 2 Race was a non-championship Formula Two motor race held at Charterhall on 23 May 1953. The race was won by Ken Wharton in a Cooper T23-Bristol. Bobbie Baird was second in a Ferrari 500 and Jimmy Stewart third in a Cooper T20-Bristol.

== Results ==
Pos	No	Driver	Entrant	Car	Time/Retired
1	2	(United Kingdom) Ken Wharton	Ken Wharton	Cooper T23-Bristol	29:30, 81.3 mph
2	11	(United Kingdom) Bobbie Baird	Bobbie Baird	Ferrari 500	
3	6	(United Kingdom) Jimmy Stewart	Ecurie Ecosse	Cooper T20-Bristol	
4	67	(United Kingdom) Jock McBain	Border Reivers	Cooper T20-Bristol	
	5	(United Kingdom) Ian Stewart	Ecurie Ecosse	Connaught Type A-Lea Francis	
	14	(Republic of Ireland) Torrie Large	Bobbie Baird	Alta F2	
	19	(United Kingdom) Jack Walton	Jack Walton	Frazer Nash-Bristol	
	30	(United Kingdom) J.E. Robinson	J.E. Robinson	Aston Martin	
	31	(United Kingdom) Bill Black	W.B. Black	Frazer Nash-Bristol	
	35	(United Kingdom) Frank Curtis	F.G. Curtis	HWM-Alta	
	68	(United Kingdom) Raymond Fielding	Raymond Fielding	HWM-Alta	

Previous race: 1953 Ulster Trophy	Formula One non-championship races 1953 season	Next race: 1953 Grand Prix des Frontières
Previous race: —	Winfield JC Formula 2 Race	Next race: —
