= Philip Fotheringham-Parker =

British racing driver (1907–1981)

- Born: 22 September 1907; Beckenham, Kent, England
- Died: 15 October 1981 (aged 74); Beckley, East Sussex, England

Formula One World Championship career
- Nationality: (United Kingdom) British
- Active years: 1951
- Team: non-works Maserati
- Entries: 1
- Championships: 0
- Wins: 0
- Podiums: 0
- Career points: 0
- Pole positions: 0
- Fastest laps: 0
- First entry: 1951 British Grand Prix

Philip Fotheringham-Parker (22 September 1907 – 15 October 1981) was a racing driver from England.

Fotheringham-Parker participated in the 1951 British Grand Prix, driving a privately run Maserati 4CL, but retired from the race after a problem with an oil pipe. Later that year, he won the 1951 Scottish Grand Prix, a nonchampionship Formula One race at Winfield. Fotheringham-Parker took part in the 1953 24 Hours of Le Mans with Sydney Allard, but retired from the race after four laps due. He also took part in the 1954 Monte Carlo Rally with a Ford Zephyr.

== Complete Formula One World Championship results ==
(key)

Year	Entrant	Chassis	Engine	1	2	3	4	5	6	7	8	WDC	Points
1951	P. Fotheringham-Parker	Maserati 4CL	Maserati L4s	SUI	500	BEL	FRA	GBR; Ret	GER	ITA	ESP	NC	0
