= Brian Shawe-Taylor =

British racing driver (1915–1999)

- Born: 28 January 1915; Dublin, Ireland
- Died: 1 May 1999 (aged 84); Cheltenham, Gloucestershire, England

Formula One World Championship career
- Nationality: (United Kingdom) British
- Active years: 1950–1951
- Team(s): non-works Maserati, Ferrari, ERA
- Entries: 3 (2 starts)
- Championships: 0
- Wins: 0
- Podiums: 0
- Career points: 0
- Pole positions: 0
- Fastest laps: 0
- First entry: 1950 British Grand Prix
- Last entry: 1951 British Grand Prix

Brian Newton Shawe-Taylor (28 January 1915 – 1 May 1999) was a British racing driver. He participated in three World Championship Grands Prix and numerous non-Championship Formula One races. He scored no World Championship points.

== Early life and education ==
Shawe-Taylor was born in Dublin, Ireland, the younger of two sons of Francis Manley Shawe-Taylor (1869–1920), magistrate and high sheriff for the county of Galway, and his wife, Agnes Mary Eleanor née Ussher (1874–1939). His parents were members of the Anglo-Irish ruling classes; he was related to the playwright and co-founder of the Abbey Theatre, Lady Gregory and a cousin of Sir Hugh Lane who founded Dublin's gallery of modern art.

Following the murder of the father in 1920 by Irish nationalists, the family moved to England, where Shawe-Taylor attended Shrewsbury School.

== Career ==
Shawe-Taylor started racing before the war, winning the Nuffield Trophy in 1939. After the war he raced an ERA, with which he tried to enter the 1950 British Grand Prix. The organisers deemed his car to be too old, but he managed to take part in the race anyway, by sharing the Maserati 4CL of Joe Fry. The following year, he practiced a Ferrari entered by Tony Vandervell at the 1951 French Grand Prix, but ultimately Reg Parnell drove the car during the race.

Shawe-Taylor's entry was accepted for the 1951 British Grand Prix, despite the fact that he was still campaigning his old ERA, and he finished the race in 8th position as the top privateer, albeit six laps down on the winner. He also raced in the 24 Hours of Le Mans that year, sharing an Aston Martin DB2 with George Abecassis, finishing 5th. He was later seriously injured in an accident at Goodwood, when he spun the ERA and was hit by Toni Branca. Shawe-Taylor recovered but his career was ended.

== Family ==
Shawe-Taylor was the younger brother of the music critic Desmond Shawe-Taylor, and the father of the art historian and Surveyor of the Queen's Pictures, the younger Desmond Shawe-Taylor, LVO.

== Complete Formula One World Championship results ==
(key)

Year	Entrant	Chassis	Engine	1	2	3	4	5	6	7	8	WDC	Points
1950	Joe Fry	Maserati 4CL	Maserati Straight-4	GBR; 10*	MON	500	SUI	BEL	FRA	ITA		NC	0
1951	G A Vandervell	Ferrari 375 Thinwall	Ferrari	SUI	500	BEL	FRA; DNS					NC	0
1951	Brian Shawe-Taylor	ERA B Type	ERA Straight-6					GBR; 8	GER	ITA	ESP	NC	0

* Indicates shared drive with Joe Fry
