= Peter Whitehead (racing driver) =

British racing driver (1914–1958)

- Nationality: (United Kingdom) British
- Born: Peter Nield Whitehead; 12 November 1914 Menston, Yorkshire, England
- Died: 21 September 1958 (aged 43) Lasalle, France
Peter Whitehead
Formula One World Championship career
- Active years: 1950–1954
- Team(s): Ferrari, (incl. non-works) non-works Alta and Cooper
- Entries: 12 (10 starts)
- Championships: 0
- Wins: 0
- Podiums: 1
- Career points: 4
- Pole positions: 0
- Fastest laps: 0
- First entry: 1950 Monaco Grand Prix
- Last entry: 1954 British Grand Prix
24 Hours of Le Mans career
- Years: 1950–1955, 1957–1958
- Teams: Peter Walker, Jaguar Cars Ltd., Cooper Car Co., David Brown, A. G. Whitehead
- Best finish: 1st (1951)
- Class wins: 1 (1951)

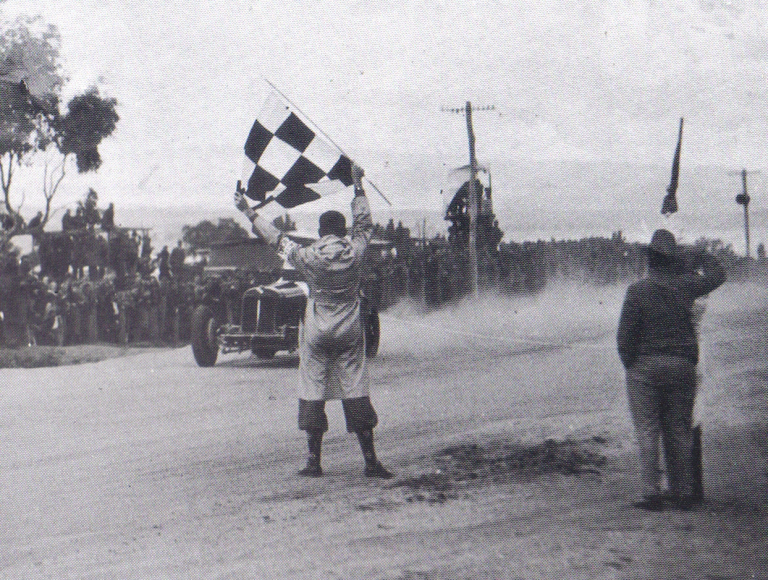
Whitehead (ERA R10B) takes the flag to win the 1938 Australian Grand Prix

Peter Nield Whitehead (12 November 1914 – 21 September 1958) was a British racing driver. He was born in Menston, Yorkshire and was killed in an accident at Lasalle, France, during the Tour de France endurance race. A cultured, knowledgeable and well-travelled racer, he was excellent in sports cars. He won the 1938 Australian Grand Prix, which along with a 24 Heures du Mans win in 1951, probably was his finest achievement, but he also won two 12 Heures internationales de Reims events. He was a regular entrant, mostly for Peter Walker and Graham Whitehead, his half-brother. His death in 1958 ended a career that started in 1935 – however, he was lucky to survive an air crash in 1948.

== Early life and pre-war racing ==
Yorkshireman Whitehead, coming from a wealthy background, gained from the wool industry, started racing in a Riley when he was 19. He moved up to an ERA B-Type the following season and then scored the first major result for the Alta, when he finished third in the Limerick Grand Prix, a Formula Libre race. In 1936, he shared his ERA with Peter Walker, and finished third in the Donington Grand Prix. He took the ERA to Australia in 1938 while touring on business, where he scored his first major victory, winning the 1938 Australian Grand Prix at Bathurst, as well as the inaugural Australian Hillclimb Championship. He returned in England in 1939 and gained a third place in the Nuffield Trophy.

== Post-war racing career ==
During World War II, Whitehead was a pilot with the Royal Air Force, and he was back in competition as soon as racing was revived, taking his trusty ERA to second place in the British Empire Trophy, held at the Douglas Circuit on the Isle of Man in the summer of 1947. He also raced in the Lausanne Grand Prix, finishing sixth.

In 1948, Whitehead survived a plane crash at Croydon Aerodrome, when he was on his way to Milano, to arrange the purchase a Ferrari 125. The accident left him badly hurt and out of racing for a year.

=== Grand Prix racer ===
Whitehead and his close friend and co driver Dudley Folland were the first people to whom Enzo Ferrari ever sold a Formula One car: a Ferrari 125 in 1949. Dudley Folland had the car painted green, with a red Welsh Dragon painted on the bonnet, a reference to his Welsh roots.

Whitehead won the Velká cena Československa. In doing so, he became the first Englishman to win a major international motor race outside of the United Kingdom since Richard Seaman. The following season, Whitehead made his debut in the Drivers' World Championship at Monaco, but did not start. His next outing in the championship came in the Grand Prix l’A.C.F., where he came close to winning but was slowed with a gearbox problem which he dropped to third. That was to be his only podium finished in 11 championship starts between 1950 and 1954.

During 1950 season, Whitehead won two minor Formula One races, the Jersey Road Race and the Ulster Trophy, but the biggest career victory came in Sports Cars. He continued to race and win in Formula Two across Europe. Later, he added victories in the 1954 Lady Wigram Trophy, in New Zealand, and repeated the feat in 1956 and 1957. He also won the 1956 Rand Grand Prix. All four of those victories, he was driving a Ferrari.

=== Sports car racing ===
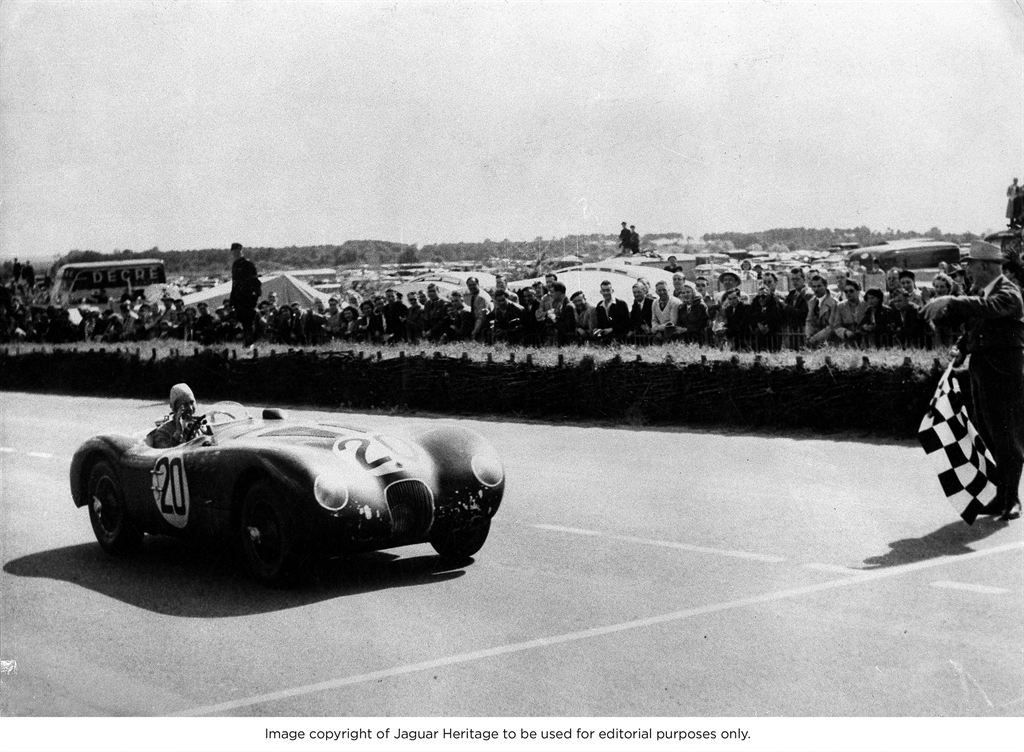
Whitehead takes the flag to win the 1951 24 Hours of Le Mans race

1950 saw Whitehead start his first 24 Hours of Le Mans race, together with John Marshall in a Jaguar XK120. The pair finished in 15th place. He teamed up with Peter Walker to win the 1951 race, however, in a Jaguar C-Type, at an average speed of 93.112 mph (149.849 km/h).

In 1953, Whitehead decided to concentrate on sports cars, and in July, he saw more success sharing a Jaguar C-Type with Stirling Moss in the 12 Heures Internationales de Reims. He returned again in 1954, in a full works supported Jaguar D-Type to win the event again partnered by Ken Wharton. Prior to that first win at Reims, he also won the Hyères 12 Hours.

Later in 1954, again paired with Wharton, Whitehead was placed sixth in the RAC Tourist Trophy road race.

== Death ==
Whitehead's last great performance was at Le Mans in 1958 where he came second in an Aston Martin DB3S, sharing the driving with his half-brother, Graham. A couple of months later, on 21 September 1958, Peter and Graham were competing together in the Tour de France, when their Jaguar 3.4-Litre crashed off a bridge into a 30-foot (9.1 m) ravine at Lasalle, near Nîmes after overturning twice, with Graham at the wheel. Graham escaped with serious but not life-threatening injuries, but Peter was killed instantly.

== Racing record ==
=== Career highlights ===
Season	Series	Position	Team	Car
1935	Limerick Grand Prix	3rd		Alta
1936	Nuffield Trophy	3rd	Peter Whitehead	ERA B-Type
	Donington Grand Prix	3rd	Peter Whitehead	ERA B-Type
1937	JCC 200	2nd	Peter Whitehead	ERA B-Type
	JCC 200 Grand Prix	3rd	Peter Whitehead	ERA B-Type
1938	Australian Hillclimb Championship	1st		ERA B-Type
	Australian Grand Prix	1st		ERA B-Type
1939	Nuffield Trophy	3rd	Peter Whitehead	ERA B-Type
1947	British Empire Trophy	2nd		ERA B-Type
1949	Velká cena Československa	1st		Ferrari 125
	Richmond Trophy	2nd		ERA B-Type
	Woodcote Cup	2nd		ERA B-Type
	Grand Prix de France	3rd		Ferrari 125
1950	Jersey Road Race	1st		Ferrari 125
	Ulster Trophy	1st		Ferrari 125
	RAC Tourist Trophy	2nd		Jaguar XK120
	Grand Prix de l’A.C.F.	3rd	Peter Whitehead	Ferrari 125
	BRDC International Trophy	3rd	Peter Whitehead	Ferrari 125
	FIA Formula One World Championship	9th	Peter Whitehead	Ferrari 125
1951	Les 24 Heures du Mans	1st	Peter Walker	Jaguar C-Type
	Preis der Ostschweiz-Erlen	1st	Peter Whitehead	Ferrari 125/166
	Gran Premio del V Centenario Colombiano	2nd	Peter Whitehead	Ferrari 125/166
	Hastings Trophy	2nd		ERA E-Type
	Grand Prix de Bordeaux	3rd		Ferrari 125
	Grand Prix de Rouen-les-Essarts	3rd		Ferrari 125/166
1953	12 Hours of Hyères	1st	P.N. Whitehead	Jaguar C-Type
	12 heures internationales	1st	P.N. Whitehead	Jaguar C-Type
	Mid-Cheshire M.C. F2 race	2nd	Atlantic Stable	Cooper-Alta T24
	RedeX Trophy	2nd	Atlantic Stable	Cooper-Alta T24
	AMOC Trophy	3rd	Atlantic Stable	Cooper-Alta T24
	Coronation Trophy	3rd	Atlantic Stable	Cooper-Alta T24
	Goodwood Nine-Hours	3rd	W. Lyons	Jaguar XK120C
1954	Lady Wigram Trophy	1st	Peter Whitehead	Ferrari 125
	12 heures internationales	1st	Jaguar Cars Ltd.	Jaguar D-Type
	Circuito do Porto	3rd	Peter Whitehead	Cooper-Jaguar T33
1955	New Zealand Grand Prix	2nd	Peter Whitehead	Ferrari 500/625
1956	Lady Wigram Trophy	1st	Peter Whitehead	Ferrari 500/750S
	Southland Road Race	1st	Peter Whitehead	Ferrari 500/750S
	Rand Grand Prix	1st	Peter Whitehead	Ferrari 500/750S
	Ardmore Grand Prix	2nd	Peter Whitehead	Cooper-Jaguar T38
	New Zealand Grand Prix	3rd	Peter Whitehead	Ferrari 500/750S
	Australian Grand Prix	3rd	Peter Whitehead	Ferrari 555
1957	Lady Wigram Trophy	1st	Peter Whitehead	Ferrari 555/860
	Southland Road Race	1st	Peter Whitehead	Ferrari 555/860
	New Zealand Grand Prix	2nd	Peter Whitehead	Ferrari 555/860
	Dunedin Road Race	3rd	Peter Whitehead	Ferrari 555/860
1958	24 Heures du Mans	2nd	A.G. Whitehead	Aston Martin DB3S

=== Complete Formula One World Championship results ===
(key)

Year	Entrant	Chassis	Engine	1	2	3	4	5	6	7	8	9	WDC	Points
1950	Peter Whitehead	Ferrari 125	Ferrari V12	GBR	MON; DNS	500			FRA; 3	ITA; 7			9th	4
1950	Scuderia Ferrari	Ferrari 125	Ferrari V12				SUI; DNA	BEL					9th	4
1951	Peter Whitehead	Ferrari 125	Ferrari V12	SUI; Ret	500	BEL	FRA; Ret		GER	ITA; Ret			NC	0
1951	Peter Whitehead	Ferrari 375	Ferrari V12								ESP; DNA		NC	0
1951	G A Vandervell	Ferrari 375 Thinwall	Ferrari V12					GBR; 9					NC	0
1952	Peter Whitehead	Alta F2	Alta Straight-4	SUI	500	BEL	FRA; Ret						NC	0
1952	Peter Whitehead	Ferrari 125/166	Ferrari V12					GBR; 10	GER	NED	ITA; DNQ		NC	0
1953	Atlantic Stable	Cooper T24	Alta Straight-4	ARG	500	NED	BEL	FRA	GBR; 9	GER	SUI	ITA	NC	0
1954	Peter Whitehead	Cooper T24	Alta Straight-4	ARG	500	BEL	FRA	GBR; Ret	GER	SUI	ITA	ESP	NC	0

=== Non-Championship Formula One results ===
(key)

Year	Entrant	Chassis	Engine	1	2	3	4	5	6	7	8	9	10	11	12	13	14	15	16	17	18	19	20	21	22	23	24	25	26	27	28	29	30	31	32	33	34	35
1949	Peter Whitehead	Ferrari 125	Ferrari V12	BUE	EVA	RIO	SRM; Ret	PAU	RIC	PAU	JER; 7	ROU	MAR	GBR; 8	EMP	FRO	BEL; 4	SUI; 9	ALB	FRA; 3	ZAN; DNS	INT	LAU; 10	ITA; Ret	GOO	AUS	CSR; 1	SAL	PER									
1950	Peter Whitehead	Ferrari 125	Ferrari V12	PAU	RIC; Ret	SRM; Ret	PAR	EMP	BAR	JER; 1	ALB	NED; 4	NAT	NOT	ULS; 1	PES	STT	INT; 3	GOO; Ret	PEN																		
1951	Peter Whitehead	Ferrari 125	Ferrari V12	SYR	PAU	RIC	SRM; Ret	BOR; 3	INT	PAR	ULS; DNS	SCO	NED; ALT	ALB	PES; 5	BAR; 6	GOO																					
1952	Peter Whitehead	Ferrari 125/166	Ferrari V12	RIO	SYR; 5	VAL; 4	RIC; DNA	LAV	PAU	IBS; DNA			INT; 5	ELÄ	NAP	EIF		ALB; 5	FRO	ULS							DAI; 11	COM	NAT									
1952	Peter Whitehead	Alta F2	Alta L4								MAR; Ret	AST					PAR; Ret				MNZ; Ret	LAC	ESS	MAR; Ret	SAB; DNA	CAE				BAU; Ret	MOD	CAD	SKA	MAD; 4	AVU	JOE; Ret	NEW; 7	RIO
1953	Peter Whitehead	Cooper T24	Alta L4	SYR; 5	PAU	LAV; 5	AST; 3	BOR; Ret	INT; 8	ELÄ	NAP	ULS; 4	WIN	FRO	COR; 3	EIF	ALB; 5	PRI	ESS	MID	ROU	CRY; 5	AVU	USF	LAC	BRI	CHE; 2	SAB	NEW	CAD	RED; 2	SKA	LON	MOD	MAD	JOE	CUR	
1954	Peter Whitehead	Cooper T24	Alta L4	SYR	PAU	LAV; Ret	BOR; Ret	INT; DNA	BAR	CUR	ROM	FRO	COR	BRC	CRY	ROU	CAE	AUG	COR	OUT	RED; Ret	PES	JOE	CAD	BER	GOO	DAI											

=== Complete 24 Hours of Le Mans results ===
Year	Team	Co-Drivers	Car	Class	Laps	Pos.	Class Pos.
1950	(United Kingdom) P.C.D. Walker	(United Kingdom) John Marshall	Jaguar XK120	S5.0	225	15th	8th
1951	(United Kingdom) Peter Walker	(United Kingdom) Peter Walker	Jaguar C-Type	S5.0	267	1st	1st
1952	(United Kingdom) Jaguar Ltd.	(United Kingdom) Ian Stewart	Jaguar C-Type	S5.0		DNF (Head gasket)	
1953	(United Kingdom) Jaguar Cars Ltd.	(United Kingdom) Ian Stewart	Jaguar C-Type	S5.0	297	4th	3rd
1954	(United Kingdom) Jaguar Cars Ltd.	(United Kingdom) Ken Wharton	Jaguar D-Type	S5.0	131	DNF (Gearbox)	
1955	(United Kingdom) Cooper Cars Co	(United Kingdom) Graham Whitehead	Cooper-Jaguar T38	S5.0	36	DNF (Oil pressure)	
1957	(United Kingdom) D. Brown	(United Kingdom) Graham Whitehead	Aston Martin DBR2	S5.0	81	DNF (Gearbox)	
1958	(United Kingdom) A.G. Whitehead	(United Kingdom) Graham Whitehead	Aston Martin DB3S	S3.0	293	2nd	2nd

=== Complete 12 Hours of Reims results ===
Year	Team	Co-Drivers	Car	Class	Laps	Pos.	Class Pos.
1953	(United Kingdom) P.N. Whitehead	(United Kingdom) Stirling Moss	Jaguar C-Type	S+2.0	243	1st	1st
1954	(United Kingdom) Jaguar Cars Ltd.	(United Kingdom) Ken Wharton	Jaguar D-Type		222	1st	1st

=== Complete 12 Hours of Hyères results ===
Year	Team	Co-Drivers	Car	Class	Laps	Pos.	Class Pos.
1953	(United Kingdom) P.N. Whitehead	(United States) Tom Cole	Jaguar C-Type	S+3.0	204	1st	1st
1954	(United Kingdom) Peter Whitehead	(United Kingdom) Duncan Hamilton	Cooper-Jaguar T33			DNS (Broken crankshaft)	
1955	(United Kingdom) Graham Whitehead	(United Kingdom) Graham Whitehead	Aston Martin DB3S			DNF (Cooling)	

=== Complete 12 Hours of Pescara results ===
Year	Team	Co-Drivers	Car	Class	Laps	Pos.	Class Pos.
1953	(United Kingdom) Peter Whitehead	(United Kingdom) Duncan Hamilton	Jaguar C-Type			DNF (Steering)	

=== Complete 12 Hours of Casablanca results ===
Year	Team	Co-Drivers	Car	Class	Laps	Pos.	Class Pos.
1953	(United Kingdom) Graham Whitehead	(United Kingdom) Graham Whitehead	Aston Martin DB3	S+2.0		5th	4th

Sporting positions
Preceded by Les Murphy	Australian Grand Prix; Winner; 1938	Succeeded by Allan Tomlinson
Preceded by Louis Rosier; Jean-Louis Rosier	Winner of the 24 Hours of Le Mans; 1951; With: Peter Walker	Succeeded by Hermann Lang; Fritz Riess
