= 1950 Buenos Aires Grand Prix =

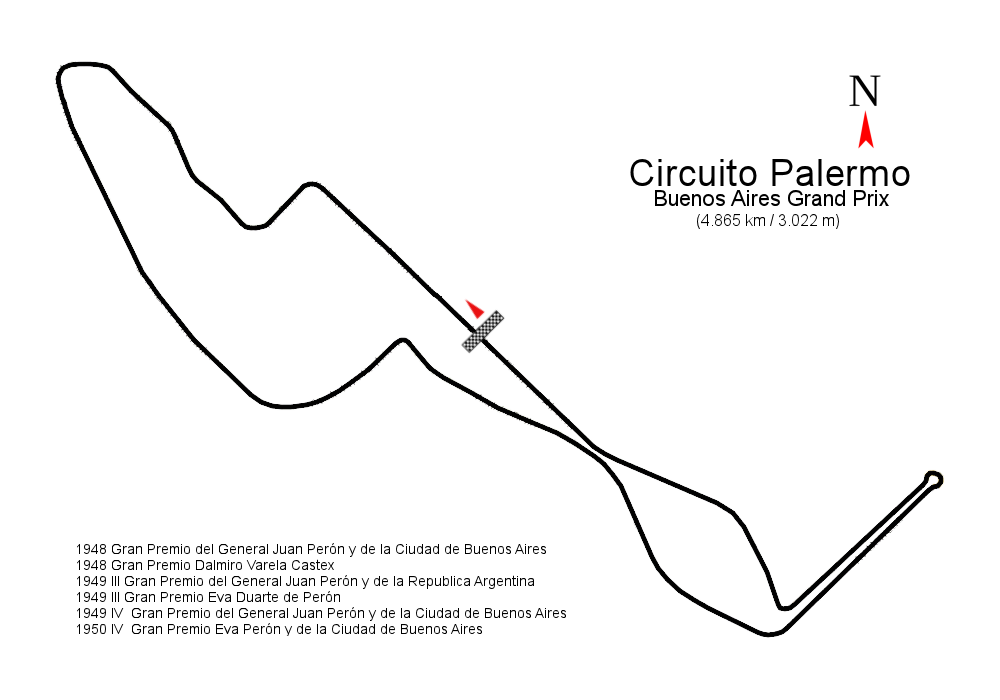

Race details
- Date: January 8, 1950
- Official name: IV Gran Premio Eva Duarte de Perón
- Location: Parco Palermo Buenos Aires
- Course: Public roads
- Course length: 4.865 km (3.022 miles)
- Distance: 30 laps, 145.950 km (90.689 miles)

Pole position
Driver	(Argentina) Juan Manuel Fangio	Ferrari 166C
- Time: 2:29.9 (116.84 km/h)

Fastest lap
Driver	(Italy) Luigi Villoresi	Ferrari 166FL
- Time: 2:28.4 (118.02 km/h)

Podium
First	(Italy) Luigi Villoresi	Ferrari 166FL
Second	(Italy) Dorino Serafini	Ferrari 125C
Third	(Argentina) Clemar Bucci	Alfa Romeo 12C-37

Results from the 1950 Buenos Aires Grand Prix (also called IV Gran Premio Extraordinario Maria Eva Duarte de Perón) held at the Palermo Street Circuit in Buenos Aires on 8 January 1950.

== Classification ==
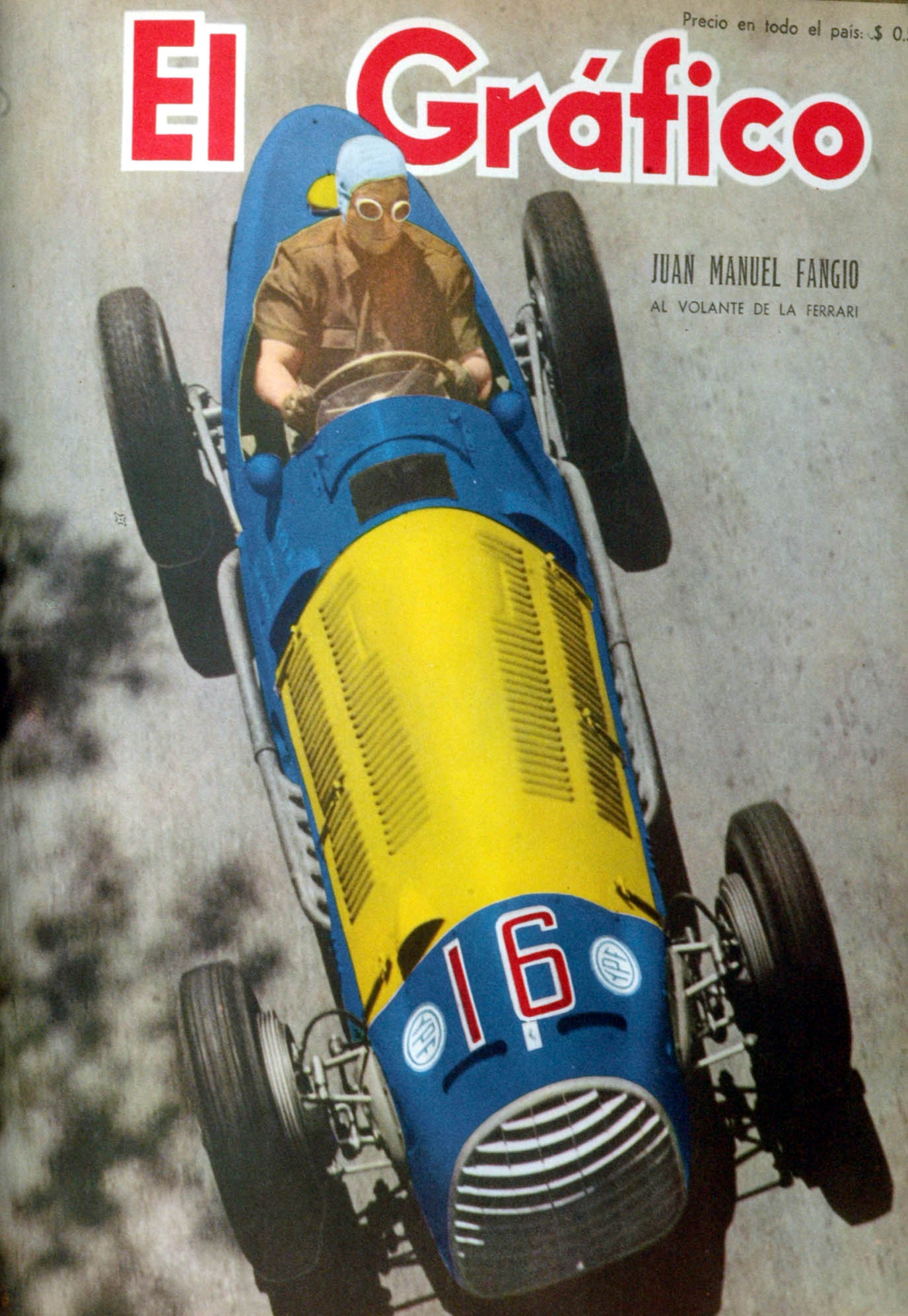
Ferrari 166 FL s/n 011F with the start no. 16 driven by Juan Manuel Fangio in 4th place at the 1950 Buenos Aires Grand Prix on 8 January 1950 at the Circuito Palermo

Pos	Driver	Constructor	Laps	Time/Retired
1	(Italy) Luigi Villoresi	Ferrari 166 FL	30	1:18:20.8
2	(Italy) Dorino Serafini	Ferrari 125 C	30	1:18:45.8
3	(Argentina) Clemar Bucci	Alfa Romeo 12C-37	30	1:18:48.5
4	(Argentina) Juan Manuel Fangio	Ferrari 166 FL	30	1:19:01.0
5	(Italy) Felice Bonetto	Maserati 4CLT Milano	30	1:19:29.8
6	(Italy) Nino Farina	Maserati 4CLT	30	1:20:08.8
7	(France) Louis Rosier	Talbot-Lago T26C	30	1:20:35.0
8	(United Kingdom) Reg Parnell	Maserati 4CLT	30	1:20:39.0
9	(Thailand) Prince Bira	Maserati 4CLT	30	1:20:55.8
10	(United Kingdom) Peter Whitehead	Ferrari 125C	29	
11	(Italy) Clemente Biondetti	Maserati 4CLT	29	
12	(Argentina) José Froilán González	Maserati 4CL	27	DNF
Ret	(Monaco) Louis Chiron	Maserati 4CLT	23	DNF
Ret	(Uruguay) Eitel Cantoni	Maserati 4CL	18	DNF
Ret	(Italy) Piero Taruffi	Maserati 4CLT	17	DNF
Ret	(Switzerland) Emmanuel de Graffenried	Maserati 4CLT	17	DNF
Ret	(France) Philippe Étancelin	Talbot-Lago T26C	16	DNF
Ret	(Italy) Piero Carini	Maserati 4CLT	16	DNF
Ret	(Italy) Alberto Ascari	Ferrari 166 FL	5	DNF
Ret	(Argentina) Benedicto Campos	Ferrari 166 FL		DNF
Ret	(Argentina) Pascual Puopolo	Maserati 4CLT		DNF
Ret	(Germany) Manfred von Brauchitsch	Maserati 4CLT		DNS
Ret	(Argentina) Óscar Alfredo Gálvez	Alfa Romeo 308		DNS
