= 1948 Buenos Aires Grand Prix (II) =

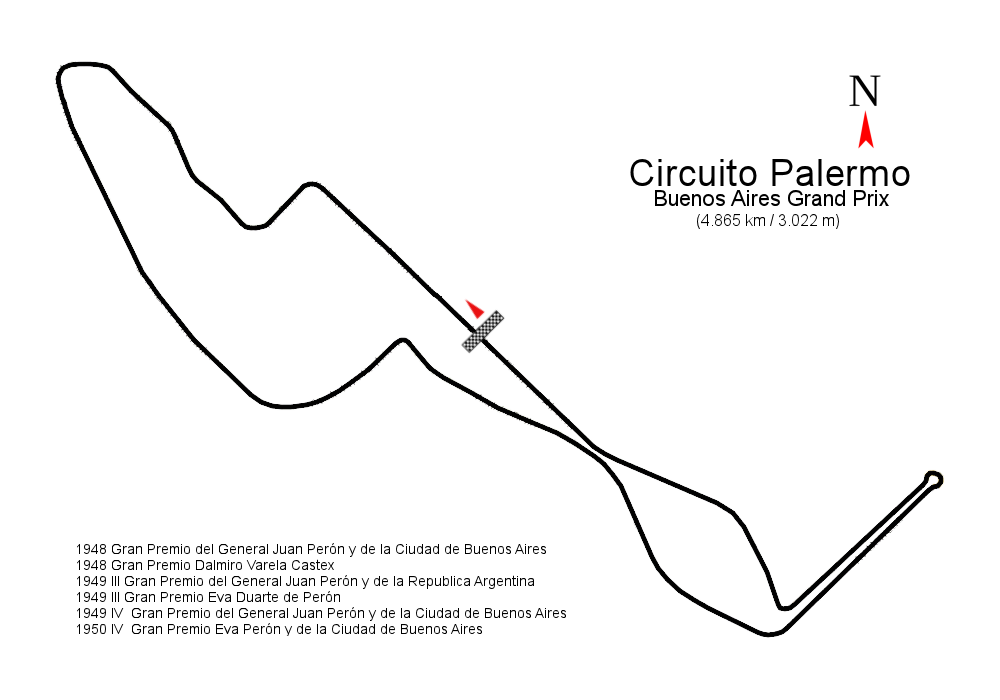

Race details
- Date: February 14, 1948
- Official name: II Gran Premio de Eva Duarte Perón (Gran Premio Dalmiro Varela Castex)
- Location: Parco Palermo Buenos Aires
- Course: Public roads
- Course length: 4.865 km (3.022 miles)
- Distance: 50 laps, 243.25 km (151.14 miles)

Pole position
Driver	(Italy) Luigi Villoresi	Maserati 4CL
- Time: N/A

Fastest lap
Driver	(Italy) Luigi Villoresi	Maserati 4CL
- Time: 2m 33.7 (114.02 km/h))

Podium
First	(Italy) Luigi Villoresi	Maserati 4CL
Second	(Argentina) Óscar Alfredo Gálvez	Alfa Romeo 308
Third	(France) Raph	Maserati 4CL

The second of two 1948 Buenos Aires Grand Prix (official name: II Gran Premio de Eva Duarte Perón (Gran Premio Dalmiro Varela Castex), was a Grand Prix motor race held at the Palermo street circuit in Buenos Aires on February 14, 1948.

== Classification ==
Pos	Driver	Constructor	Laps	Time/Retired
1	(Italy) Luigi Villoresi	Maserati 4CL	50	2:15:16.5
2	(Argentina) Óscar Alfredo Gálvez	Alfa Romeo 308	50	2:15:55.8
3	(France) Raph	Maserati 4CL	48	N/A
4	(Argentina) Pablo Pessatti	Alfa Romeo 8C-35	47	N/A
5	(Argentina) Carlos Fortunati Firpo	Maserati 1.5 sc	47	N/A
6	(Argentina) Benedicto Campos	Maserati 4CL	45	N/A
7	(Argentina) Victorio Rosa	Maserati 1.5 sc	41	N/A
8	(Argentina) Juan Manuel Fangio	Gordini 11	41	N/A
Ret	(Italy) Achille Varzi	Alfa Romeo 12C-37 A	37	Electrical
Ret	(Italy) Nino Farina	Maserati 8CL		Fuel tank
Ret	(Argentina) Pascual Puopolo	Maserati 8CL		DNF
Ret	(Brazil) Chico Landi	Alfa Romeo 308		DNF
Ret	(Uruguay) Eitel Cantoni	Maserati 4CL		Fire
Ret	(Argentina) Italo Bizio	Alfa Romeo 8C-2900A		DNF
Ret	(Argentina) Adriano Malusardi	Alfa Romeo 3.2 sc		DNF
Ret	(Argentina) Andres Fernández	Maserati 1.5 sc		DNF
Ret	(France) Jean-Pierre Wimille	Gordini 15		DNA
Ret	(Italy) Gabriele Besana	Ferrari 166 SC		DNF

Grand Prix Race
1948 Grand Prix season
Previous race: 1948 Buenos Aires Grand Prix (I)	Buenos Aires Grand Prix	Next race: 1949 Buenos Aires Grand Prix (I)
