= 1949 Grand Prix season =

Fourth post-war year for Grand Prix racing

Seasons
- ← 1948 1950 →

The 1949 Grand Prix season was the fourth post-war year for Grand Prix racing and the final year before the beginning of the Formula One World Championship. It was the third season of FIA Formula One motor racing, though some of that season's Grands Prix still used other formulas. Races which were run to Formula One criteria restricted engines to 1.5 litres supercharged or 4.5 litres naturally aspirated. There was no organised championship in 1949, although several of the more prestigious races were recognised as Grandes Épreuves (great trials) by the FIA. Alberto Ascari and Juan Manuel Fangio proved to be the most successful drivers, each winning five Grands Prix. Maserati's cars were the most successful brand, winning 10 of the season's 27 Grand Prix races.

== Season review ==
=== Grandes Épreuves ===
| Date | Name | Circuit | Pole position | Fastest lap | Winning driver | Winning constructor | Report |
|---|---|---|---|---|---|---|---|
| 15 May | (United Kingdom) British Grand Prix | Silverstone | (Italy) Luigi Villoresi | (Thailand) B. Bira | (Switzerland) Toulo de Graffenried | Maserati | Report |
| 19 June | (Belgium) Belgian Grand Prix | Spa-Francorchamps | (Italy) Luigi Villoresi | (Italy) Giuseppe Farina | (France) Louis Rosier | Talbot-Lago-Talbot | Report |
| 3 July | (Switzerland) Swiss Grand Prix | Bremgarten | (Italy) Giuseppe Farina | (Italy) Giuseppe Farina | (Italy) Alberto Ascari | Ferrari | Report |
| 17 July | (France) French Grand Prix | Reims-Gueux | (Italy) Luigi Villoresi | (United Kingdom) Peter Whitehead | (Monaco) Louis Chiron | Talbot-Lago-Talbot | Report |
| 11 September | (Italy) Italian Grand Prix | Monza | (Italy) Alberto Ascari | (Italy) Alberto Ascari | (Italy) Alberto Ascari | Ferrari | Report |

=== Other Grands Prix ===
| Date | Name | Circuit | Winning driver | Winning constructor | Report |
|---|---|---|---|---|---|
| 29 January | (Argentina) III Gran Premio del General Juan Perón y de la Ciudad de Buenos Aires | Palermo | (Italy) Alberto Ascari | Maserati | Report |
| 6 February | (Argentina) III Gran Premio Eva Duarte de Perón | Palermo | (Argentina) Oscar Alfredo Gálvez | Alfa Romeo | Report |
| 27 March | (Brazil) X Grande Prêmio Cidade do Rio de Janeiro | Circuito da Gávea | (Italy) Luigi Villoresi | Maserati | Report |
| 3 April | (Italy) IV San Remo Grand Prix | Ospedaletti | (Argentina) Juan Manuel Fangio | Maserati | Report |
| 18 April | (France) X Grand Prix du Pau | Circuit de Pau | (Argentina) Juan Manuel Fangio | Maserati | Report |
| 18 April | (United Kingdom) I Richmond Trophy | Goodwood | (United Kingdom) Reg Parnell | Maserati | Report |
| 24 April | (France) III Grand Prix de Paris | Linas-Montlhéry | (France) Philippe Étancelin | Talbot-Lago-Talbot | Report |
| 28 April | III JCC Jersey Road Race | St Helier | (United Kingdom) Bob Gerard | ERA | Report |
| 8 May | (France) IV Grand Prix du Roussillon | Perpignan | (Argentina) Juan Manuel Fangio | Maserati | Report |
| 14 May | (France) Grand Prix de Marseille | Marseille | (Argentina) Juan Manuel Fangio | Simca Gordini | Report |
| 26 May | (United Kingdom) XI British Empire Trophy | Douglas | (United Kingdom) Bob Gerard | ERA | Report |
| 5 June | (Belgium) XVIII Grand Prix des Frontières | Chimay | (France) Guy Mairesse | Talbot-Lago-Talbot | Report |
| 10 July | (France) XI Grand Prix de l'Albigeois | Albi (Les Planques) | (Argentina) Juan Manuel Fangio | Maserati | Report |
| 31 July | (Netherlands) II Grote Prijs van Zandvoort | Zandvoort | (Italy) Luigi Villoresi | Ferrari | Report |
| 20 August | (United Kingdom) I BRDC International Trophy | Silverstone | (Italy) Alberto Ascari | Ferrari | Report |
| 27 August | (Switzerland) Lausanne Grand Prix | Lausanne | (Italy) Giuseppe Farina | Maserati | Report |
| 17 September | (United Kingdom) II Goodwood Trophy | Goodwood | (United Kingdom) Reg Parnell | Maserati | Report |
| 18 September | (Australia) Australian Grand Prix | Leyburn | (Australia) John Crouch | Delahaye | Report |
| 25 September | (Czechoslovakia) I Velká cena Československa | Brno | (United Kingdom) Peter Whitehead | Ferrari | Report |
| 9 October | (France) V Grand Prix du Salon | Linas-Montlhéry | (France) Raymond Sommer | Talbot-Lago-Talbot | Report |
| 18 December | (Argentina) IV Gran Premio del General Juan Perón y de la Ciudad de Buenos Aires | Palermo | (Italy) Alberto Ascari | Ferrari | Report |

== Statistics ==
=== Grand Prix Winners ===
==== Drivers ====
| Drivers | Wins | |
| Drivers | Total | Grandes Épreuves |
|---|---|---|
| Alberto Ascari | 5 | 2 |
| Juan Manuel Fangio | 5 | 0 |
| Luigi Villoresi | 2 | 0 |
| Reg Parnell | 2 | 0 |
| Bob Gerard | 2 | 0 |
| Toulo de Graffenried | 1 | 1 |
| Louis Rosier | 1 | 1 |
| Louis Chiron | 1 | 1 |
| Oscar Alfredo Galvez | 1 | 0 |
| Philippe Étancelin | 1 | 0 |
| Guy Mairesse | 1 | 0 |
| Charles Pozzi | 1 | 0 |
| Giuseppe Farina | 1 | 0 |
| John Crouch | 1 | 0 |
| Peter Whitehead | 1 | 0 |
| Raymond Sommer | 1 | 0 |

===== Manufacturers =====
| Manufacturer | Wins | |
| Manufacturer | Total | Grandes Épreuves |
|---|---|---|
| Maserati | 10 | 1 |
| Ferrari | 6 | 2 |
| Talbot-Lago-Talbot | 5 | 2 |
| ERA | 2 | 0 |
| Delahaye | 2 | 0 |
| Alfa Romeo | 1 | 0 |
| Simca Gordini | 1 | 0 |
