= 1949 Buenos Aires Grand Prix (III) =

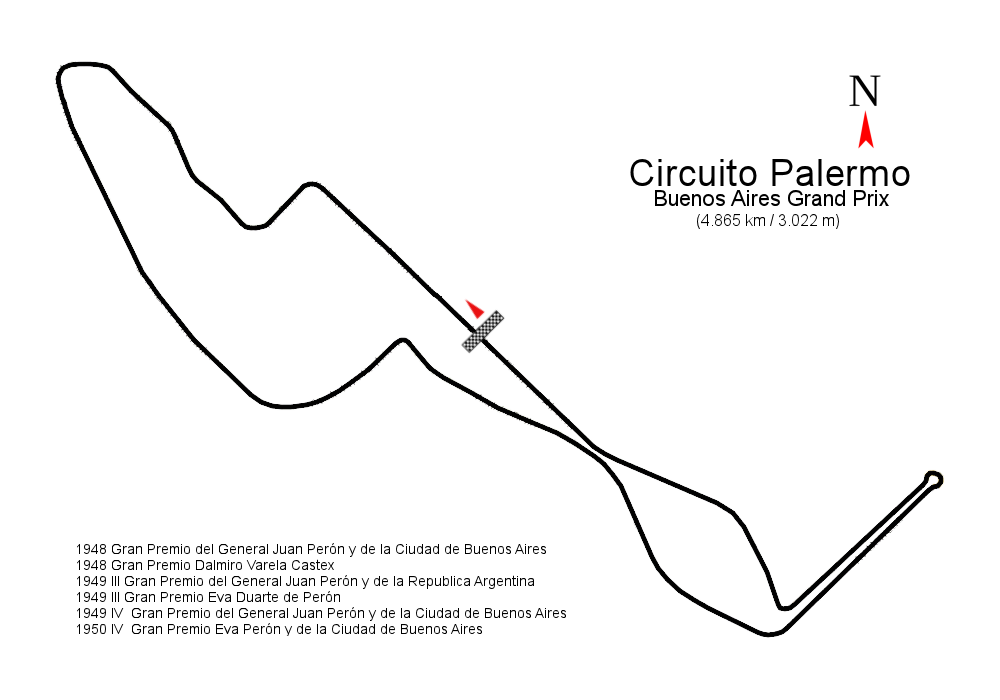

Race details
- Date: December 18, 1949
- Official name: IV Gran Premio del General Juan Perón y de la Ciudad de Buenos Aires
- Location: Parco Palermo Buenos Aires
- Course: Public roads
- Course length: 4.865 km (3.022 miles)
- Distance: 35 laps, 170.27 km (105.80 miles)

Pole position
Driver	(Italy) Luigi Villoresi	Maserati 4CL
- Time: N/A

Fastest lap
Driver	(Argentina) Juan Manuel Fangio	Ferrari 166 FL
- Time: 2m 29.2 (117.39 km/h)

Podium
First	(Italy) Alberto Ascari	Ferrari 166 FL
Second	(Argentina) Juan Manuel Fangio	Ferrari 166 FL
Third	(Italy) Luigi Villoresi	Ferrari 166 FL

The third of three 1949 Buenos Aires Grand Prix (official name: IV Gran Premio del General Juan Perón y de la Ciudad de Buenos Aires), was a Grand Prix motor race held at the Palermo street circuit in Buenos Aires on December 18, 1949.

== Classification ==
Pos	Driver	Constructor	Laps	Time/Retired
1	(Italy) Alberto Ascari	Ferrari 166 FL	35	1:29:00.2
2	(Argentina) Juan Manuel Fangio	Ferrari 166 FL	35	1:29:29.4
3	(Italy) Luigi Villoresi	Ferrari 166 FL	35	1:30:38.
4	(Argentina) Benedicto Campos	Ferrari 166 FL	34	N/A
5	(Argentina) Froilán González	Maserati 4CLT	34	N/A
6	(Thailand) P. Bira	Maserati 4CLT	34	N/A
7	(Switzerland) Emmanuel de Graffenried	Maserati 4CLT	33	N/A
8	(Italy) Dorino Serafini	Ferrari 125C F1	33	N/A
9	(Italy) Clemente Biondetti	Maserati 4CLT	33	N/A
10	(United Kingdom) Peter Whitehead	Ferrari 125C F1	32	N/A
11	(Monaco) Louis Chiron	Maserati 4CLT	32	N/A
Ret	(France) Philippe Étancelin	Maserati 4CLT	32	Oil pressure
Ret	(Uruguay) Eitel Cantoni	Maserati 4CM	32	
Ret	(Italy) Piero Taruffi	Maserati 4CLT	20	
Ret	(Italy) Nino Farina	Maserati 4CLT	16	N/A
Ret	(France) Louis Rosier	Talbot T26	14	
Ret	(Italy) Piero Carini	Maserati 4CLT	11	
Ret	(Argentina) Pascual Puopolo	Maserati 4CLT	9	
Ret	(United Kingdom) Reg Parnell	Maserati 4CLT	6	
Ret	(Argentina) Clemar Bucci	Alfa Romeo 12C	5	
Ret	(Italy) Felice Bonetto	Maserati 4CLT	4	
DNS	(Argentina) Óscar Alfredo Gálvez	Alfa Romeo 308		
DNS	(Germany) Manfred von Brauchitsch	Maserati 8CL		

Grand Prix Race
1949 Grand Prix season
Previous race: 1949 Buenos Aires Grand Prix (II)	Buenos Aires Grand Prix	Next race: 1950 Buenos Aires Grand Prix
