= 1949 Lausanne Grand Prix =

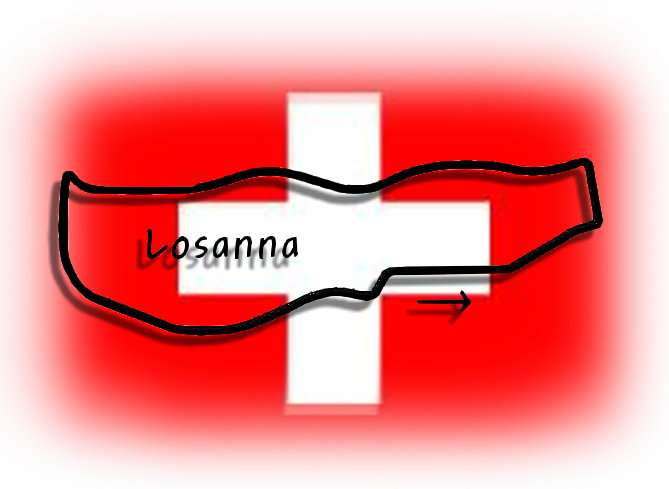

Race details
- Date: 27 August 1949
- Official name: Lausanne Grand Prix
- Location: Lausanne
- Course length: 3.252 km (2.021 mi)
- Distance: 90 laps, 292.67 km (181.86 mi)

Pole position
Driver	(Italy) Giuseppe Farina	Maserati
- Time: 1:42.4

Podium
First	(Italy) Giuseppe Farina	Maserati
Second	(Italy) Alberto Ascari	Ferrari
Third	(Switzerland) Emmanuel de Graffenried	Maserati

The 1949 Lausanne Grand Prix was a non-championship Formula One motor race held in Lausanne on 28 August 1949. The race was held over 90 laps and was won from pole position by Giuseppe Farina in a Maserati 4CLT/48. Alberto Ascari in a Ferrari 125 was second and Emmanuel de Graffenried in another Maserati was third.

== Classification ==
=== Race ===
Pos	No	Driver	Entrant	Manufacturer	Time/Retired	Grid
1	10	(Italy) Giuseppe Farina	G. Farina	Maserati 4CLT/48	2:44:27.2, 105.91kph	1
2	14	(Italy) Alberto Ascari	Scuderia Ferrari	Ferrari 125	+20.8s	2
3	26	(Switzerland) Emmanuel de Graffenried	Scuderia Enrico Platé	Maserati 4CLT/48	+3 laps	5
4	38	(Italy) Franco Cortese	Scuderia Ferrari	Ferrari 166	+3 laps	15
5	4	(Monaco) Louis Chiron	Ecurie France	Talbot-Lago T26C	+4 laps	9
6	12	(Italy) Luigi Villoresi	Scuderia Ferrari	Ferrari 125	+5 laps	3
7	8	(Belgium) Johnny Claes	Ecurie Belge	Talbot-Lago T26C	+6 laps	12
8	30	(Switzerland) Toni Branca	A. Branca	Maserati 4CL	+10 laps	13
9	20	(United Kingdom) David Murray (United Kingdom) Roy Parnell	D.A. Hampshire	ERA B-Type	+12 laps	14
10	22	(United Kingdom) Peter Whitehead	P.N. Whitehead	Ferrari 125	+12 laps	7
Ret.	24	(Thailand) B. Bira	Scuderia Enrico Platé	Maserati 4CLT/48	69 laps, fuel tank	4
Ret.	2	(France) Raymond Sommer	G. Bianchetti	Ferrari 166	48 laps, overheating	8
Ret.	6	(France) Philippe Étancelin	Philippe Étancelin	Talbot-Lago T26C	34 laps, spin	6
Ret.	28	(Switzerland) Frankie Séchehaye	Scuderia Enrico Platé	Maserati 4CL	24 laps, spin	16
Ret.	16	(United Kingdom) David Hampshire	Reg Parnell	Maserati 4CLT/48	14 laps, magneto	10
Ret.	36	(Germany) Hans Stuck	H. Stuck	AFM-BMW 328	6 laps, fuel feed	11
DNQ	32	(Switzerland) Max Christen	M. Christen	Suiza-Maserati		
DNQ	34	(Switzerland) Ernest Ramseyer	Ecurie Geneve	Maserati 4CM		

Previous race: 1949 BRDC International Trophy	Formula One non-championship races 1949 season	Next race: 1949 Goodwood Trophy
Previous race: 1947 Lausanne Grand Prix	Lausanne Grand Prix	Next race: —
