= 1949 Buenos Aires Grand Prix (II) =

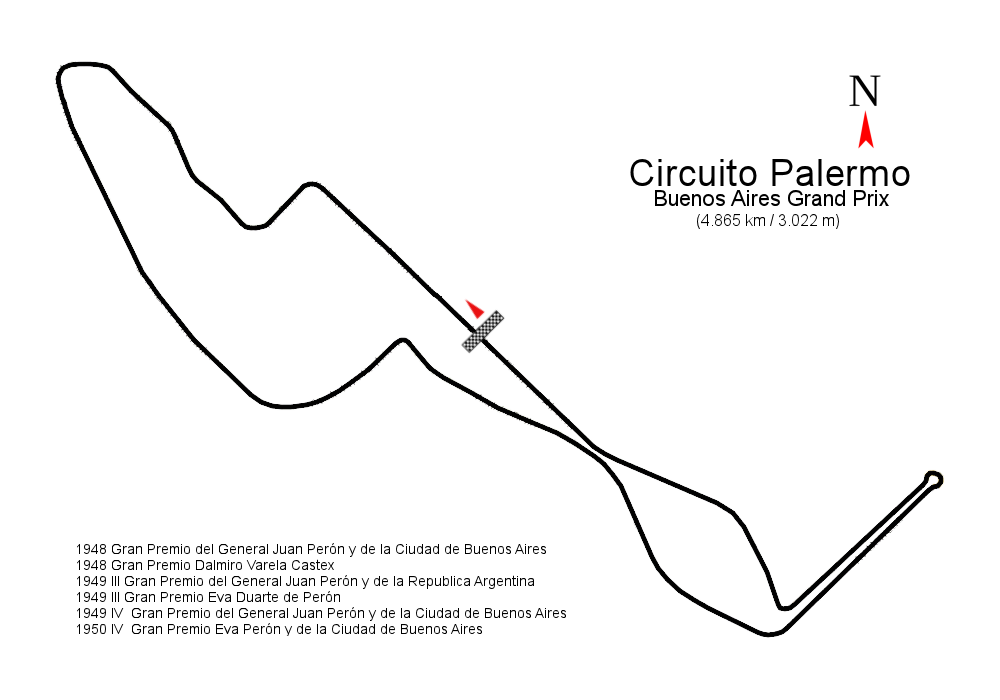

Race details
- Date: February 6, 1949
- Official name: III Gran Premio de Eva Duarte Perón
- Location: Parco Palermo Buenos Aires
- Course: Public roads
- Course length: 4.865 km (3.022 miles)
- Distance: 30 laps, 145.95 km (90.68 miles)

Pole position
Driver	(Italy) Luigi Villoresi	Maserati 4CL
- Time: N/A

Fastest lap
Driver	(Italy) Luigi Villoresi	Maserati 4CLT
- Time: 2m 50.7 (102.60 km/h)

Podium
First	(Argentina) Óscar Alfredo Gálvez	Alfa Romeo 308
Second	(Argentina) Juan Manuel Fangio	Maserati 4CLT
Third	(Uruguay) Eitel Cantoni	Maserati 4CL

The second of three 1949 Buenos Aires Grand Prix (official name: III Gran Premio de Eva Duarte Perón), was a Grand Prix motor race held at the Palermo street circuit in Buenos Aires on February 6, 1949. The race was shortened from 35 laps due to rain.

== Classification ==
Pos	Driver	Constructor	Laps	Time/Retired
1	(Argentina) Óscar Alfredo Gálvez	Alfa Romeo 308	30	1:31:04
2	(Argentina) Juan Manuel Fangio	Maserati 4CLT	28	N/A
3	(Uruguay) Eitel Cantoni	Maserati 4CL	27	N/A
4	(Argentina) Adriano Malusardi	Maserati 4CLT	27	N/A
5	(Thailand) P. Bira	Maserati 4CLT	27	N/A
6	(Italy) Alberto Ascari	Maserati 4CLT	25	Engine
Ret	(Italy) Luigi Villoresi	Maserati 4CLT	11	Carburetor
Ret	(Italy) Nino Farina	Ferrari 125C F1		Crash
Ret	(United Kingdom) Reg Parnell	Maserati 4CLT	10	Radiator
Ret	(Argentina) Benedicto Campos	Maserati 4CLT		Oil Pipe

Grand Prix Race
1949 Grand Prix season
Previous race: 1949 Buenos Aires Grand Prix (I)	Buenos Aires Grand Prix	Next race: 1949 Buenos Aires Grand Prix (III)
