= 1949 Buenos Aires Grand Prix (I) =

- 1949 Grand Prix season
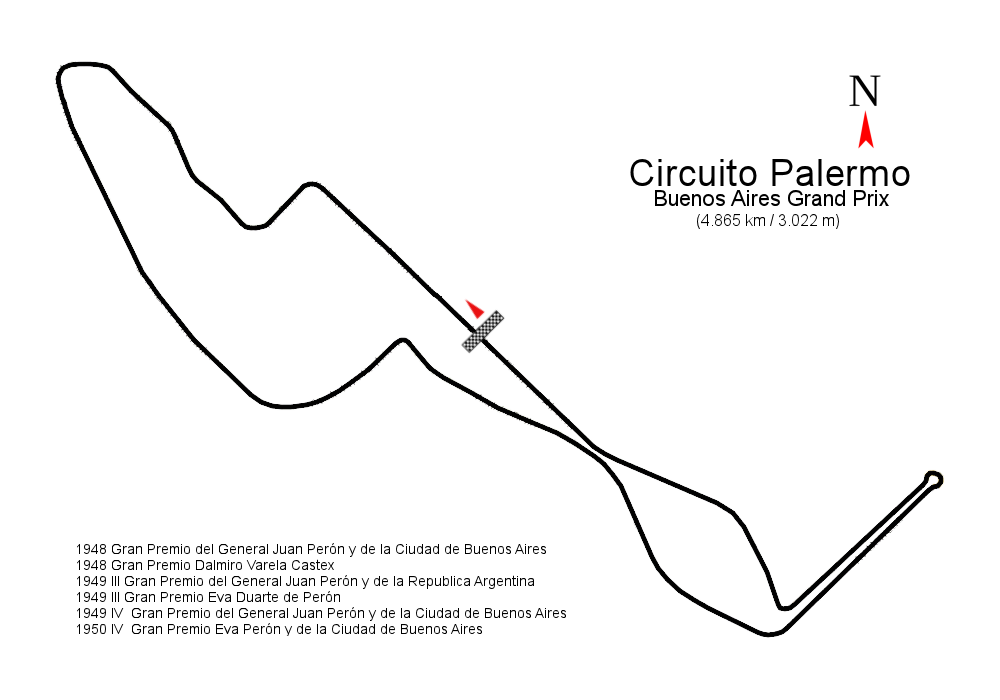

Race details
- Date: January 30, 1949
- Official name: III Gran Premio del General Juan Perón y de la Ciudad de Buenos Aires
- Location: Parco Palermo Buenos Aires
- Course: Public roads
- Course length: 4.87 km (3.03 miles)
- Distance: 35 laps, 170 km (106 miles)

Pole position
Driver	(Italy) Alberto Ascari	Maserati
- Time: 2:36.8

Fastest lap
Drivers	(Italy) Alberto Ascari	Maserati
	(Italy) Luigi Villoresi	Maserati
- Time: 2:32.4 (tied) (114.85 km/h)

Podium
First	(Italy) Alberto Ascari	Maserati
Second	(Italy) Luigi Villoresi	Maserati
Third	(Argentina) Óscar Alfredo Gálvez	Alfa Romeo

The first of three 1949 Buenos Aires Grand Prix (official name: III Gran Premio del General Juan Perón y de la Ciudad de Buenos Aires) was a Grand Prix motor race that took place on January 30, 1949, at the Palermo street circuit in Buenos Aires, Argentina.

The event was marred by the death of popular French driver Jean-Pierre Wimille. He was driving his first flying lap during practice, when his car swerved to avoid children crossing the track, and slammed into a tree. He died instantly of massive head injuries. During the race, local driver Pablo Pessatti was also killed when his car overturned, and he was thrown out.

== Classification ==
Pos	Driver	Constructor	Laps	Time/Retired
1	(Italy) Alberto Ascari	Maserati 4CLT	35	1:30:23.1
2	(Italy) Luigi Villoresi	Maserati 4CLT	35	+41.0
3	(Argentina) Óscar Alfredo Gálvez	Alfa Romeo 308	35	+2:31.9
4	(Argentina) Juan Manuel Fangio	Maserati 4CLT	34	+1 Lap
5	(Thailand) Prince Bira	Maserati 4CLT	31	+4 Laps
6	(Argentina) Victorio Rosa	Maserati 4CLT	29	+6 Laps
7	(Argentina) Adriano Malusardi	Maserati 4CLT	25	+10 Laps
8	(Argentina) Benedicto Campos	Maserati 4CL		
Ret	(Italy) Nino Farina	Maserati 4CL		
Ret	(United Kingdom) Reg Parnell	Maserati 4CL	4	Engine
Ret	(Argentina) Ernesto Tornquist	Maserati 4CL	4	Engine
Ret	(Argentina) Pascual Puopolo	Maserati 8CL	4	Engine
Ret	(Argentina) Ernesto Tornquist	Maserati 4CL	4	Engine
Ret	(Argentina) Pablo Pessatti	Alfa Romeo		Fatal accident
DNS	(France) Jean-Pierre Wimille	Simca-Gordini	0	Fatal accident
DNS	(France) Amédée Gordini	Simca-Gordini	0	

Grand Prix Race
1949 Grand Prix season
Previous race: 1948 Buenos Aires Grand Prix (II)	Buenos Aires Grand Prix	Next race: 1949 Buenos Aires Grand Prix (II)
