= 1949 Rio de Janeiro Grand Prix =

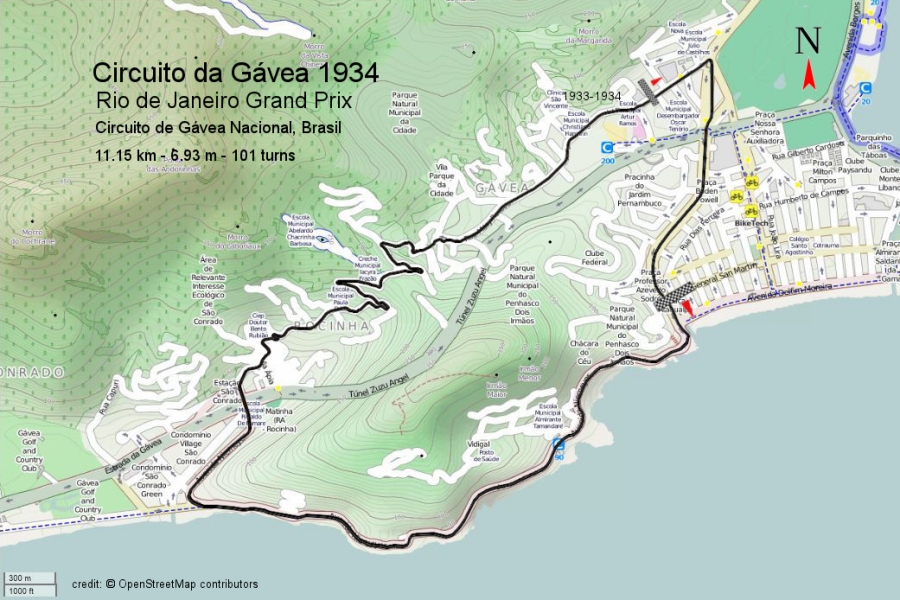

Race details
- Date: 27 March 1949
- Official name: X Grande Prêmio da Cidade de Rio de Janeiro
- Location: Gávea, Rio de Janeiro
- Course: Temporary road circuit
- Course length: 10.78 km (6.70 mi)
- Distance: 15 laps, 161.64 km (100.44 mi)

Fastest lap
| Driver | (Brazil) Chico Landi | Maserati |
- Time: 7:39.6

Podium
| First | (Italy) Luigi Villoresi | Maserati |
| Second | (Italy) Giuseppe Farina | Ferrari |
| Third | (Brazil) Francisco Marques | Maserati |

The X Grande Prêmio da Cidade de Rio de Janeiro was a Grand Prix motor race held on 27 March 1949 at the Gávea street circuit in Rio de Janeiro, Brazil. The race was held over 15 laps and was won by Luigi Villoresi in a Maserati 4CLT. Chico Landi in a Maserati 4CL set fastest lap but retired after an accident.

== Classification ==
| Pos | Driver | Car | Time/Retired |
|---|---|---|---|
| 1 | (Italy) Luigi Villoresi | Maserati 4CLT | 1:57:17.3, 82.806kph |
| 2 | (Italy) Giuseppe Farina | Ferrari 125 C | +42.0s |
| 3 | (Brazil) Francisco Marques | Maserati 4CL | +6:01.3 |
| 4 | (Brazil) Aloísio Fontenelle | Alfa Romeo 8C 2300 | +7:29.4 |
| 5 | (Brazil) Henrique Casini | Alfa Romeo | +1 lap |
| 6 | (Brazil) Annuar de Góes Daquer | Maserati | +2 laps |
| Ret. | (Brazil) Domingo Lopes | Bugatti | 9 laps, accident |
| Ret. | (Brazil) Chico Landi | Maserati 4CL | 7 laps, accident |
| Ret. | (Italy) Alberto Ascari | Maserati 4CLT | Accident |
| Ret. | (Brazil) Benedicto Lopes | Bugatti | |
| | (Brazil) Antônio Fernandes da Silva | Maserati | |
| | (Brazil) Carlos Barbosa | Maserati | |
| | (Brazil) Nino Stefanini | Bugatti | |
| | (Brazil) Rodrigo Miranda | Maserati | |

Grand Prix Race
| Previous race: 1949 Buenos Aires Grand Prix (II) | 1949 Grand Prix season Grandes Épreuves | Next race: 1949 San Remo Grand Prix |
| Previous race: 1948 Rio de Janeiro Grand Prix | Rio de Janeiro Grand Prix | Next race: 1952 Rio de Janeiro Grand Prix |
