= 1948 Buenos Aires Grand Prix (I) =

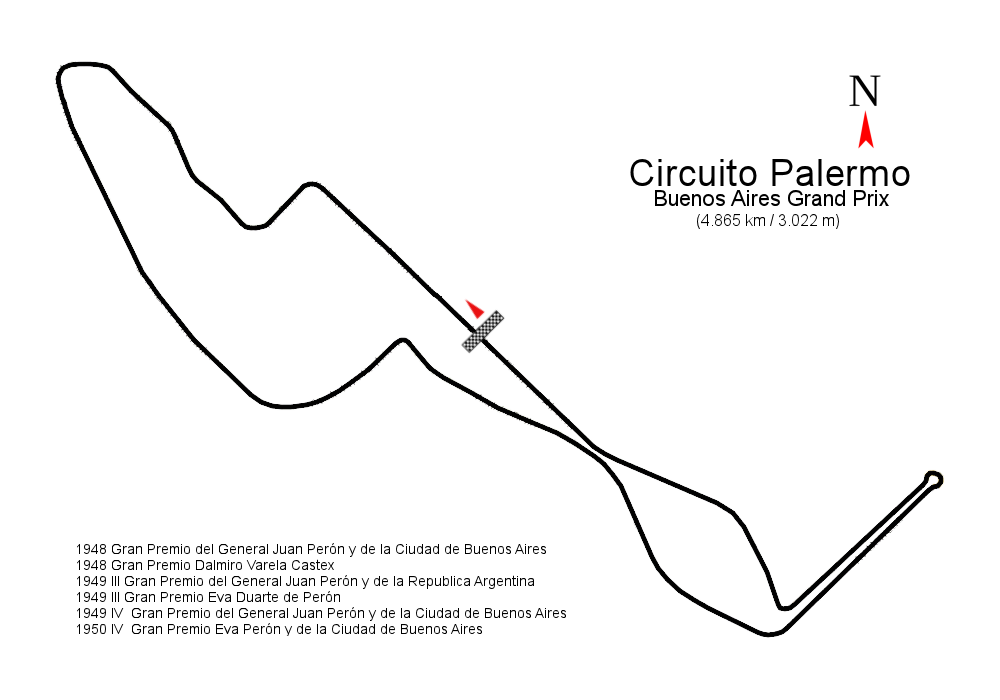

Race details
- Date: January 17/18 1948
- Official name: II Gran Premio del General Juan Perón y de la Ciudad de Buenos Aires
- Location: Parco Palermo Buenos Aires
- Course: Public roads
- Course length: 4.865 km (3.022 miles)
- Distance: 25 laps, 121.6 km (75.55 miles)

Pole position
Driver	(Italy) Nino Farina	Maserati 8CL
- Time: 2:37.6 (111.13 km/h)

Fastest lap
Driver	(Italy) Luigi Villoresi	Maserati 4CL
- Time: 2:37.4 (111.27 km/h)

Podium
First	(Italy) Luigi Villoresi	Maserati 4CL
Second	(Brazil) Chico Landi	Alfa Romeo 308
Third	(Argentina) Andres Fernández	Maserati 6CM

The first of two 1948 Buenos Aires Grand Prix (official name: II Gran Premio del General Juan Perón y de la Ciudad de Buenos Aires) was a Grand Prix motor race held at the Palermo street circuit in Buenos Aires on January 17–18, 1948.

== Classification ==
Pos	Driver	Constructor	Laps	Time/Retired
1	(Italy) Luigi Villoresi	Maserati 4CL	25	1:11:46.6
2	(Brazil) Chico Landi	Alfa Romeo 308	25	1:12:24.6
3	(Argentina) Andres Fernández	Maserati 6CM	24	1:13:31.3
4	(Italy) Arialdo Ruggeri	Maserati 4CL	24	1:14:15.1
5	(Argentina) Victorio Rosa	Maserati 6CM	23	1:14:55.3
6	(France) Raph	Maserati 4CL	21	1:14:20.3
Ret	(Argentina) Óscar Alfredo Gálvez	Alfa Romeo 308	7	DNF
Ret	(Argentina) Juan Manuel Fangio	Maserati 4CL	4	DNF
Ret	(Argentina) Italo Bizio	Alfa Romeo 2900 A	3	DNF
Ret	(Italy) Nino Farina	Maserati 8CL	3	DNF
Ret	(Italy) Achille Varzi	Alfa Romeo 12C-37	2	DNF
Ret	(Italy) Enrico Platé	Maserati 4CL	2	DNF
Ret	(Argentina) Pascual Puopolo	Maserati 8CL		DNS
Ret	(France) Jean-Pierre Wimille	Alfa Romeo 8C-308		DNS
Ret	(Uruguay) Eitel Cantoni	Maserati 4CM		DNS
Ret	(Italy) Gabriele Besana	Ferrari 166 SC		DNS

Grand Prix Race
1948 Grand Prix season
Previous race: 1947 Buenos Aires Grand Prix (II)	Buenos Aires Grand Prix	Next race: 1948 Buenos Aires Grand Prix (II)
