= 1949 Richmond Trophy =

1949 Goodwood Trophy

Race details
- Date: 18 April 1949
- Official name: I Richmond Trophy
- Location: Goodwood Circuit
- Course length: 3.830 km (2.380 mi)
- Distance: 10 laps, 38.30 km (23.80 mi)

Pole position
Driver	(United Kingdom) Bob Ansell	Maserati
- Grid positions set by ballot

Fastest lap
Driver	(United Kingdom) Reg Parnell	Maserati
- Time: 1:40.2

Podium
First	(United Kingdom) Reg Parnell	Maserati
Second	(United Kingdom) Peter Whitehead	ERA
Third	(United Kingdom) Cuth Harrison	ERA

The 1st Richmond Trophy was a non-championship Formula One motor race held at Goodwood Circuit on 18 April 1949. The race was held over 10 laps and was won by Reg Parnell in a Maserati 4CLT/48. Parnell also set fastest lap. ERA drivers Peter Whitehead and Cuth Harrison were second and third.

== Classification ==
=== Race ===
Pos	No	Driver	Manufacturer	Time/Retired
1	22	(United Kingdom) Reg Parnell	Maserati 4CLT/48	17:22.4, 133.39kph
2	26	(United Kingdom) Peter Whitehead	ERA B-Type	+3.8s
3	40	(United Kingdom) Cuth Harrison	ERA C-Type	+6.8s
4	23	(United Kingdom) Fred Ashmore	Maserati 4CLT/48	+18.4s
5	43	(United Kingdom) Leslie Johnson	ERA E-Type	+25.8s
6	39	(United Kingdom) George Abecassis	Alta GP	+1:13.0
7	24	(United Kingdom) Bob Ansell	Maserati 4CL	+1 lap
8	29	(United Kingdom) Dick Habershon	Delage 15S8	+1 lap
9	35	(United Kingdom) Guy Gale	Talbot T150C	+1 lap
Ret	25	(United Kingdom) Duncan Hamilton	Maserati 6CM	3 laps
Ret	28	(United Kingdom) Geoff Ansell	ERA B-Type	3 laps
Ret	27	(United Kingdom) David Murray	Maserati 4CL	2 laps
Ret	42	(United Kingdom) Bob Gerard	Maserati 4CL	1 lap, collision
Ret.	31	(United Kingdom) Tony Rolt	Aitken-Alfa Romeo	
DNA	41	(United Kingdom) Archie Baring	Maserati 4CM	

Previous race: 1949 Pau Grand Prix	Formula One non-championship races 1949 season	Next race: 1949 Paris Grand Prix
Previous race: —	Richmond Trophy	Next race: 1950 Richmond Trophy
