= 1953 Mid-Cheshire MC Race =

1953 Mid-Cheshire M.C. Formula 2 Race
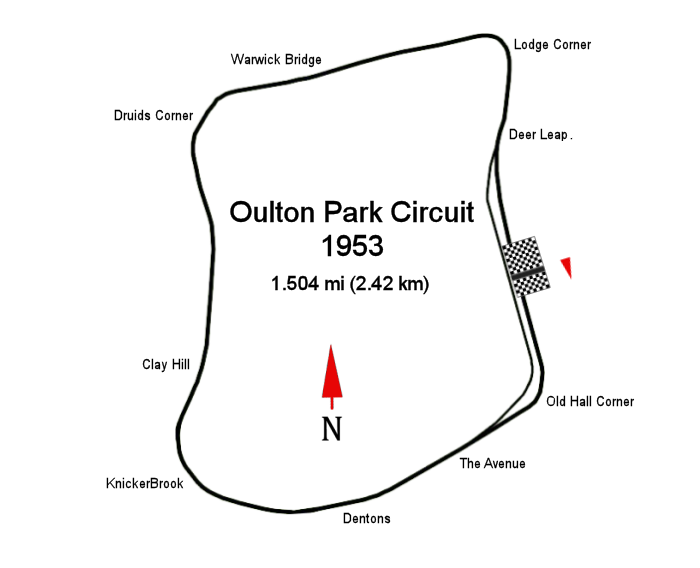

Race details
- Date: 8 August 1953
- Official name: I Mid-Cheshire M.C. Formula 2 Race
- Location: Oulton Park Circuit, Cheshire
- Course: Permanent racing facility
- Course length: 2.421 km (1.504 mi)
- Distance: 33 laps, 79.877 km (49.633 mi)

Pole position
Driver	(United Kingdom) Les Leston	Cooper-JAP
- Time: 1:09.0

Fastest lap
Driver	(United Kingdom) Tony Rolt	Connaught-Lea Francis
- Time: 1:08.2

Podium
First	(United Kingdom) Tony Rolt	Connaught-Lea Francis
Second	(United Kingdom) Peter Whitehead	Cooper-Alta
Third	(United Kingdom) Hon. Edward Greenall	Cooper-JAP

The 1st Mid-Cheshire MC Formula 2 Race was a Formula Two motor race held on 8 August 1953 at Oulton Park Circuit, Cheshire. The race was run over 33 laps of the circuit, and was won by British driver Tony Rolt in a Connaught Type A-Lea Francis; Rolt also setting fastest lap. Peter Whitehead in a Cooper T24-Alta was second and the Hon. Edward Greenall was third in a Cooper T18-JAP. Les Leston in a Cooper T26-JAP started from pole position but retired after 12 laps.

== Results ==
Pos	No.	Driver	Entrant	Constructor	Time/Retired	Grid
1	38	(United Kingdom) Tony Rolt	R.R.C. Walker Racing Team	Connaught Type A-Lea Francis	38:33.4, 124.35kph	2
2	37	(United Kingdom) Peter Whitehead	Atlantic Stable	Cooper T24-Alta	+1 lap	3
3	47	(United Kingdom) Hon. Edward Greenall	Hon. Edward Greenall	Cooper T18-JAP	+1 lap	5
4	39	(United Kingdom) Brian Naylor	Brian Naylor	Alta F2	+1 lap	6
Ret.	45	(United Kingdom) Les Leston	Les Leston	Cooper T26-JAP	12 laps, steering	1
Ret.	44	(United Kingdom) Leslie Marr	Leslie Marr	Connaught Type A-Lea Francis	6 laps, gear lever	4

Previous race: 1953 Bristol MC & LCC Race	Formula One non-championship races 1953 season	Next race: 1953 Sables Grand Prix
Previous race: —	Mid-Cheshire M.C. Formula 2 Race	Next race: —
