= Circuito Palermo =

(Argentina) Circuito Palermo
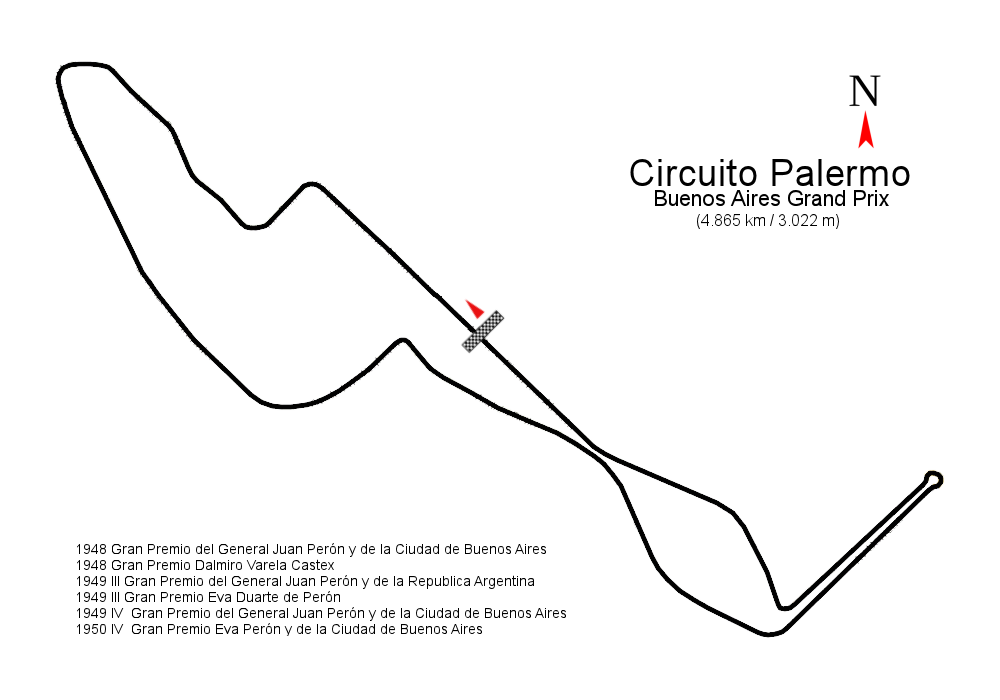
- Grand Prix Circuit (1948–1950)
- Location: Palermo, Buenos Aires
- Coordinates: 34°33′36″S 58°25′35″W
- Opened: 1948
- Closed: 1950
- Major events: Buenos Aires Grand Prix (1948–1950)

Grand Prix Circuit (1948–1950)
- Length: 4.865 km (3.023 mi)
- Turns: 15
- Race lap record: 2:28.400 ( (Italy) Luigi Villoresi, Ferrari 166 FL, 1950, FL)

The Circuito Palermo (English: Palermo Circuit) was a Grand Prix circuit in Buenos Aires (Argentina). The 4.865 km (3.023 mi) circuit used a layout of public roads within the north-end of the Palermo park complex (adjacent to the Hipodromo Argentino), to host the Buenos Aires Grand Prix from 1948 to 1950.

Palermo was the site of the General Juan Perón / Eva Duarte de Perón Grand Prix series, hosting five (of twelve) alternating editions (the first was held at the Retiro circuit in 1947).

== Buenos Aires Grand Prix 1948–1950 ==
| Year | Name | Date | Winning drivers | Constructor | Regulations | Report |
|---|---|---|---|---|---|---|
| 1948 | (Argentina) II Gran Premio del General Juan Perón y de la Ciudad de Buenos Aires | January 17–18 | (Italy) Luigi Villoresi | Maserati 4CL | Formula Libre | Report |
| 1948 | (Argentina) Gran Premio Dalmiro Varela Castex | February 14 | (Italy) Luigi Villoresi | Maserati 4CL | Formula Libre | Report |
| 1949 | (Argentina) III Gran Premio del General Juan Perón y de la Ciudad de Buenos Aires | January 29 | (Italy) Alberto Ascari | Maserati 4CL | Formula Libre | Report |
| 1949 | (Argentina) III Gran Premio de Eva Duarte Perón | February 6 | (Argentina) Óscar Alfredo Gálvez | Alfa Romeo 308 | Formula Libre | Report |
| 1949 | (Argentina) IV Gran Premio del General Juan Perón y de la Ciudad de Buenos Aires | December 18 | (Italy) Alberto Ascari | Ferrari 166 FL | Formula Libre | Report |
| 1950 | (Argentina) IV Gran Premio de Eva Perón y de la Ciudad de Buenos Aires | January 8 | (Italy) Luigi Villoresi | Ferrari 166 FL | Formula Libre | Report |
