= 1949 Paris Grand Prix =

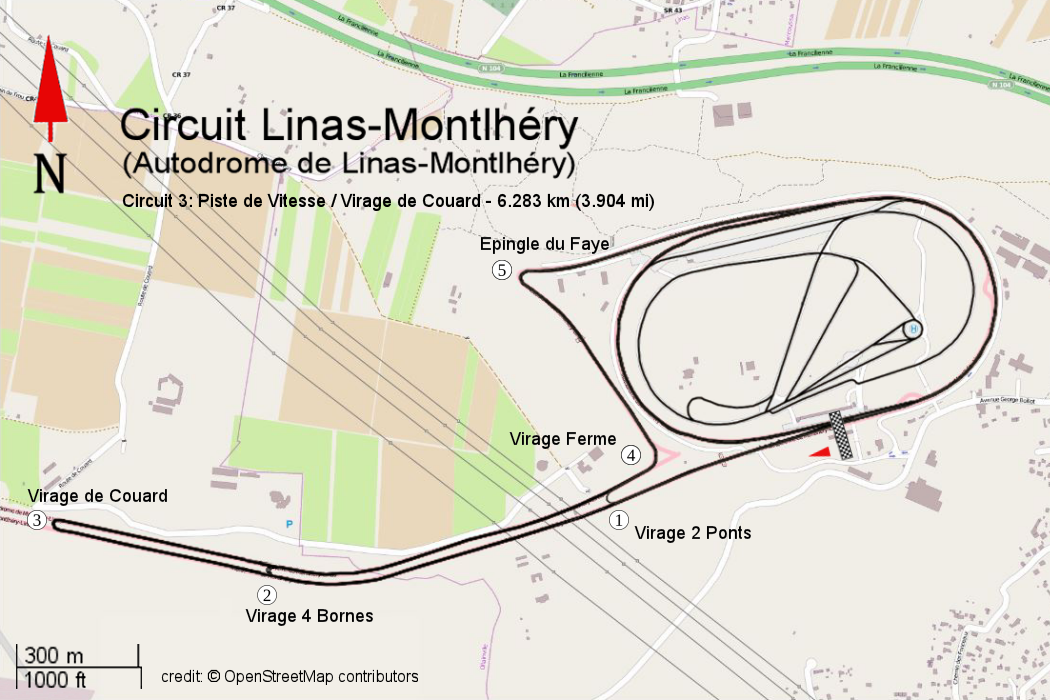

Race details
- Date: 24 April 1949
- Official name: III Grand Prix de Paris
- Location: Montlhéry, France
- Course: Permanent racing facility
- Course length: 3.91 mi (6.29 km)
- Distance: 50 laps, 195.73 mi (315.00 km)

Fastest lap
Driver	(France) Louis Rosier	Talbot-Lago
- Time: 2:24.8

Podium
First	(France) Philippe Étancelin	Talbot-Lago
Second	(France) Yves Giraud-Cabantous (France) Georges Grignard	Talbot-Lago
Third	(Belgium) Johnny Claes	Maserati

The 3rd Grand Prix de Paris was a Formula One motor race held on 24 April 1949 at the Autodrome de Linas-Montlhéry, in Montlhéry near Paris, France.

The 50-lap race was won by Talbot-Lago driver Philippe Étancelin. Yves Giraud-Cabantous and Georges Grignard shared another Talbot-Lago for second place and Johnny Claes was third in a Maserati. Louis Rosier set fastest lap in a Talbot-Lago but failed to finish.

== Results ==
Pos	No.	Driver	Entrant	Constructor	Time/Retired
1	4	(France) Philippe Étancelin	P. Étancelin	Talbot-Lago T26C	2:05:31.8, 149.86kph
2	11	(France) Yves Giraud-Cabantous (France) Georges Grignard	G. Grignard	Talbot-Lago T26C	+2:06.9
3	2	(Belgium) Johnny Claes	Écurie Belge	Talbot-Lago T26C	+4 laps
4	6	(France) Marc Versini	M. Versini	Delage D6	+5 laps
5	18	(France) "Raph"	Écurie Mundia Course	Delahaye 135	+10 laps
6	15	(United Kingdom) Roy Salvadori	R. Salvadori	Maserati 4CL	+19 laps
Ret	1	(France) Pierre Levegh	P. Levegh	Talbot-Lago T26C	44 laps, valves
Ret	20	(France) Guy Mairesse	Écurie France	Talbot-Lago T26C	32 laps, oil pipe
Ret	8	(France) Robert Manzon	Equipe Gordini	Simca Gordini Type 15	18 laps, gearbox
Ret	7	(France) Louis Rosier	Ecurie Rosier	Talbot-Lago T26C	15 laps, head gasket
Ret	3	(France) Jean Judet	Jean Judet	Maserati 4CL	9 laps, accident
Ret	14	(France) Henri Louveau	H. Louveau	Delage D6	9 laps, mechanical
Ret	12	(United Kingdom) Lance Macklin	J.S. Gordon & L. Macklin	Maserati 6CM	7 laps, electrics
Ret	9	(France) Maurice Trintignant	Equipe Gordini	Simca Gordini Type 15	6 laps, gearbox
DNA	5	(Monaco) Louis Chiron	Ecurie France	Talbot-Lago T26C	
DNA	10	(France) Charles Huc	C. Huc	Talbot Speciale	
DNA	16	(France) Eugène Chaboud	Ecurie Lutetia	Delahaye Speciale	
DNA	17	(France) Robert Brunet	R. Brunet	Ferrari 166C	
DNA	18	(France) Raph	Ecurie Mundia Course	Maserati 4CL	
DNA	19	(France) Robert Morra	R. Morra	Maserati 4CM	

Previous race: 1949 Richmond Trophy	Formula One non-championship races 1949 season	Next race: 1949 Jersey Road Race
Previous race: 1948 Paris Grand Prix	Paris Grand Prix	Next race: 1950 Paris Grand Prix
