= 1953 RedeX Trophy =

Race details
- Date: 12 September 1953
- Official name: I RedeX Trophy
- Location: Snetterton Circuit, Norfolk
- Course: Permanent racing facility
- Course length: 4.362 km (2.710 mi)
- Distance: 10 laps, 43.616 km (27.102 mi)

Fastest lap
Driver	(United Kingdom) Eric Thompson	Connaught-Lea Francis
- Time: 1:52.6

Podium
First	(United Kingdom) Eric Thompson	Connaught-Lea Francis
Second	(United Kingdom) Peter Whitehead	Cooper-Alta
Third	(United Kingdom) Les Leston	Cooper-JAP

The 1st RedeX Trophy was a Formula Two motor race held on 12 September 1953 at Snetterton Circuit, Norfolk. The race was run over 10 laps, and was won by British driver Eric Thompson in a Connaught Type A-Lea Francis, setting fastest lap in the process. Peter Whitehead in a Cooper T24-Alta was second and Les Leston in a Cooper T18-JAP was third.

== Results ==
Pos.	No.	Driver	Entrant	Car	Time/Ret.
1	1	(United Kingdom) Eric Thompson	R.R.C. Walker Racing Team	Connaught Type A-Lea Francis	19:00.0; 137.22kph
2	34	(United Kingdom) Peter Whitehead	Atlantic Stable	Cooper T24-Alta	+3.8s
3	10	(United Kingdom) Les Leston	Les Leston	Cooper T18-JAP	+4.2s
4	96	(United Kingdom) Cliff Davis	Cliff Davis	Tojeiro-Frazer Nash	10 laps
Ret	100	(United Kingdom) Tony Crook	A. Crook	Cooper T20-Bristol	
Ret	86	(United Kingdom) Hon. Edward Greenall	Hon. Edward Greenall	Cooper T18-JAP	
Ret	4	(United Kingdom) Guy Jason-Henry	Ecurie Brittanique	Connaught Type A-Lea Francis	
Ret	9	(United Kingdom) Keith Hall	Border Reivers	Cooper T20-Bristol	
DNS	14	(United Kingdom) Brian Naylor	Brian Naylor	Alta-Bristol	Accident in practice
DNA	6	(United Kingdom) Jimmy Somervail	Border Reivers	Cooper T20-Bristol	
DNA	7	(United Kingdom) Jock McBain	Border Reivers	Cooper T20-Bristol	
DNA	8	(United Kingdom) Paul Emery	Emeryson Cars	Emeryson-Aston Martin	
DNA	78	(United Kingdom) Ben Wyatt	Ben Wyatt	Frazer Nash FN48	
DNA	93	(United Kingdom) Bernie Ecclestone	Bernie Ecclestone	Cooper T20-Bristol	
DNA	103	(United Kingdom) D. Brown	D. Brown	Frazer Nash Le Mans Replica	

Previous race: 1953 Circuit de Cadours	Formula One non-championship races 1953 season	Next race: 1953 Skarpnäcksloppet
Previous race: —	RedeX Trophy	Next race: 1954 RedeX Trophy
