= Roy Parnell =

English footballer (1943–2025)

Personal information
- Date of birth: 8 October 1943
- Place of birth: Birkenhead, England
- Date of death: 10 September 2025 (aged 81)
- Position: Right-back

Senior career*
| Years | Team | Apps | (Gls) |
| 1961–1964 | Everton | 3 | (0) |
| 1964–1967 | Tranmere Rovers | 105 | (2) |
| 1967–1970 | Bury | 97 | (2) |
- New Brighton
| Total | | 205+ | (4+) |

Managerial career
- New Brighton
- * Club domestic league appearances and goals

Roy Parnell (8 October 1943 – 10 September 2025) was an English footballer who played as right-back for Everton, Tranmere Rovers and Bury. He was later the player-manager of New Brighton. Parnell was born in Birkenhead, England on 8 October 1943. He died on 10 September 2025, aged 81.
