= 1953 Coupe de Printemps =

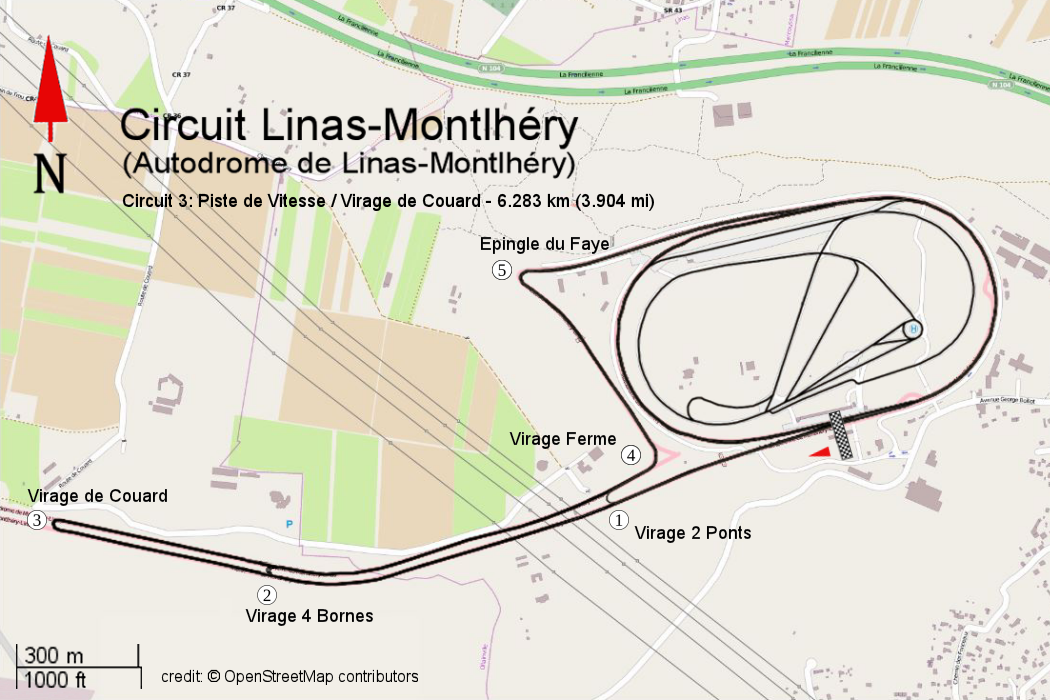

Race details
- Date: 31 May 1953
- Official name: I Coupe de Printemps
- Location: Autodrome de Linas-Montlhéry, Montlhéry, France
- Course: Permanent racing facility
- Course length: 6.284 km (3.905 mi)
- Distance: 16 laps, 100.543 km (62.475 mi)

Fastest lap
Driver	(France) Serge Nersessian	BMW Speciale
- Time: 2:34.4

Podium
First	(France) Marcel Balsa	BMW Speciale
Second	(France) Serge Nersessian	BMW Speciale
Third	(France) Pierre Duval	Duval BMW Speciale

The 1st Coupe de Printemps was a Formula Two motor race held on 31 May 1953 at the Autodrome de Linas-Montlhéry, in Montlhéry, Essonne, France. The race was held over 16 laps and was won by Marcel Balsa in a BMW Special.

== Results ==
Pos	Driver	Constructor	Time/Retired
1	(France) Marcel Balsa	BMW Speciale	42:13.4, 142.18kph
2	(France) Serge Nersessian	BMW Speciale	+3.8s
3	(France) Pierre Duval	Duval BMW Speciale	+1 lap
4	(France) Jean Judet	Ford-Ardun Speciale	+1 lap
5	(France) Noreille	Monnier-Bristol	+1 lap
6	(France) Guimbaud	Cisitalia D46	+2 laps

Previous race: 1953 Albi Grand Prix	Formula One non-championship races 1953 season	Next race: 1953 West Essex CC Formula 2 Race
Previous race: —	Coupe de Printemps	Next race: —
