= Alberto Ascari =

Italian racing driver (1918–1955)

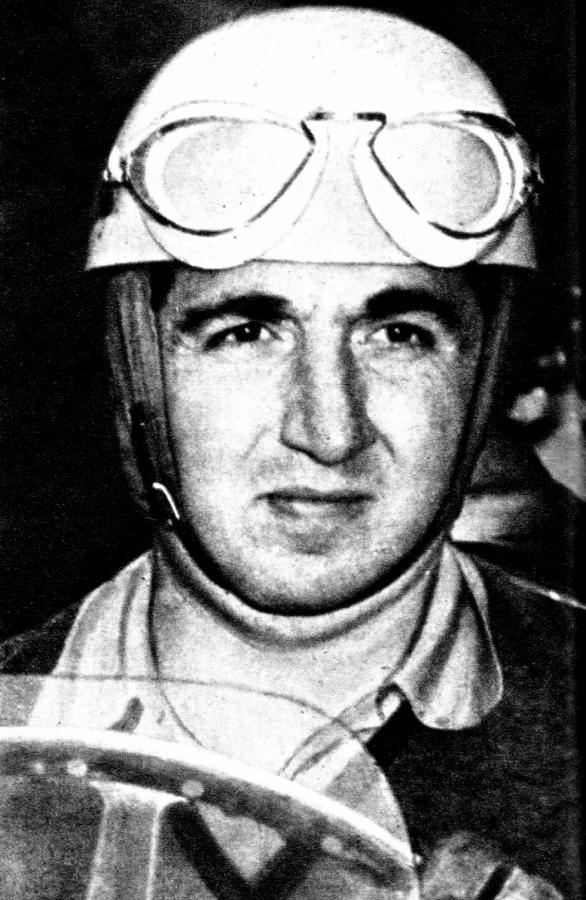
- Ascari at the 1955 Monaco Grand Prix
- Born: 13 July 1918; Milan, Lombardy, Kingdom of Italy
- Died: 26 May 1955 (aged 36); Autodromo Nazionale di Monza, Lombardy, Italy
- Cause of death: Single vehicle collision whilst testing the Ferrari 750 Monza
- Spouse: Mietta Tavola (m. 1942)
- Children: 2
- Parent: Antonio Ascari (father)

Formula One World Championship career
- Nationality: (Italy) Italian
- Active years: 1950–1955
- Team(s): Ferrari, Maserati, Lancia
- Entries: 33 (32 starts)
- Championships: 2 (1952, 1953)
- Wins: 13
- Podiums: 17
- Career points: 107 9/14 (140 1/7) (Note: Up until 1990, not all points scored by a driver contributed to their final World Championship tally (see list of points scoring systems for more information). Numbers without parentheses are Championship points; numbers in parentheses are total points scored.)
- Pole positions: 14
- Fastest laps: 12
- First entry: 1950 Monaco Grand Prix
- First win: 1951 German Grand Prix
- Last win: 1953 Swiss Grand Prix
- Last entry: 1955 Monaco Grand Prix

Alberto Ascari (13 July 1918 – 26 May 1955) was an Italian racing driver who competed in the Drivers World Championship from 1950 to 1955. Ascari won two World Drivers' Championship titles, which he won in 1952 and 1953 with Ferrari, and won 13 Grands Prix across six seasons. In endurance racing, Ascari won the Mille Miglia in 1954 with Lancia.

Noted for careful precision and finely-judged accuracy, Ascari was a multitalented racer who competed in motorcycle racing before switching to cars. He won consecutive Drivers world titles in 1952 and 1953 for Scuderia Ferrari, becoming the first Ferrari-powered World Champion and breaking several records across both seasons. The 1952 and 1953 world championships were contested using cars built to the then current Formula 2 regulations, not Formula 1. This was because the Alfa Romeo team withdrew from the championship after the 1951 season. The CSI, as the world governing body at the time decided, because of this, that a world championship with Formula 1 cars was not viable because of a lack of competitive machines. This does not make Ascari's achievements any less because all the top drivers competed in the new cars. This was sandwiched by an appearance in the 1952 Indianapolis 500, and winning the 1954 Mille Miglia.

Ascari was the first World Champion to defend his title. As of 2026, Ascari and Michael Schumacher are Ferrari's only back-to-back World Champions, and Ascari remains Ferrari's sole Italian champion. He was also the last Italian to become a Formula 1 world champion, until Kimi Antonelli did so in 2026. As the first driver to win a second World Championship in 1953, he became one of only four drivers ever to set a new record for most World Championship titles. He was surpassed by Juan Manuel Fangio's third title in 1955.

When Ascari was a young child, his father Antonio Ascari, also a famous racing driver, died in an accident at the 1925 French Grand Prix. Ascari himself was later killed during a test session for Ferrari at the Autodromo Nazionale Monza in 1955. Both were 36 years old.

== Early life ==
Born in Milan, Alberto Ascari was the son of Antonio Ascari, a talented Grand Prix motor racing star in the 1920s, racing Alfa Romeos. A fortnight after Ascari's seventh birthday, his father was killed while leading the 1925 French Grand Prix at the Autodrome de Linas-Montlhéry; the younger Ascari had an interest in racing in spite of this, and later came to dominate Grand Prix racing like no other before him. Such was his passion to become a racing driver like his father that he ran away from school twice, and sold his school books to finance his racing. Ascari raced motorcycles in his earlier years. At the age of 19, he was signed to ride for the Bianchi team. In 1940, after he entered the prestigious Mille Miglia in an Auto Avio Costruzioni 815 supplied by his father's close friend Enzo Ferrari, Ascari eventually started racing on four wheels regularly. In an interview, he famously said: "I only obey one passion, racing. I wouldn't know how to live without it."

In 1940, Ascari married a local girl. When Italy entered World War II, the family garage, by now run by Ascari, was conscripted to service and maintain vehicles of the Italian military. During this period, he and his partner fellow racing driver Luigi Villoresi established a lucrative transport business, supplying fuel to army depots in North Africa. The pair survived a ship they were aboard carrying lorries capsizing in Tripoli harbour. As their business supported the Italian war effort, it made them exempt from being called up for military service during the war.

== Career ==
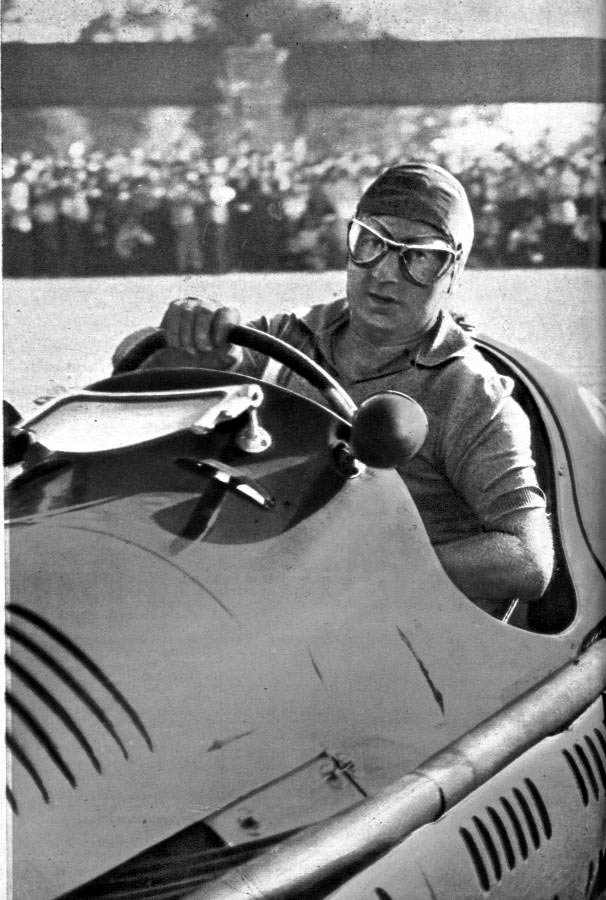
Ascari at the first 1949 Buenos Aires Grand Prix

Following the end of World War II, Ascari began racing in Grands Prix with the Maserati 4CLT. His teammate was Villoresi, who became a mentor and friend to Ascari. The pair were successful on the circuits in Northern Italy. He was nicknamed Ciccio, meaning "Tubby". Formula One regulations were introduced by the FIA in 1946, with the aim of eventually replacing the pre-war Grand Prix structure. During the next four transitional years, Ascari was at the top of his game, winning numerous events around Europe. The 1948 San Remo Grand Prix was his first win. He also took second place at the 1948 British Grand Prix, which was organised by the Royal Automobile Club and is generally considered the first British Grand Prix, at the Silverstone Circuit. With Maserati he won the first 1949 Buenos Aires Grand Prix. His biggest success came when he and Villoresi signed for Scuderia Ferrari. The team boss Enzo Ferrari had been a great friend and teammate to Ascari's father, and had taken a keen interest in his successes. In 1949, he won three more races, all with Ferrari. Driving a Ferrari, he also won the third 1949 Buenos Aires Grand Prix.

The first Formula One World Championship season took place in 1950. The Ferrari team made its World Championship debut at the 1950 Monaco Grand Prix, the second race of the season, with Ascari, Villoresi, and the famous French driver Raymond Sommer on the team. At Monaco, Ascari became the youngest driver to score points and a podium position in Formula One at 31 years, 312 days, finishing second one lap behind Juan Manuel Fangio. The team had a mixed year as the supercharged Ferrari 125 F1 was too slow to challenge the dominant Alfa Romeo team, so Ferrari began working on an unblown 4.5-litre car. Much of the year was lost as the team's 2-litre Formula Two engine was progressively enlarged. When the full 4.5-litre Ferrari 375 F1 arrived for the 1950 Italian Grand Prix, the final round of the championship, Ascari gave Alfa Romeo their sternest challenge of the year before retiring; he then took over teammate Dorino Serafini's car to finish second. The new Ferrari then won the non-championship 1950 Penya Rhin Grand Prix.

Throughout 1951, Ascari was a threat to the Alfa Romeo team, although initially he was undone by unreliability. After winning the 1951 German Grand Prix at Nürburgring, he also won the 1951 Italian Grand Prix, and was only two points behind Fangio in the championship standings ahead of the climactic 1951 Spanish Grand Prix, where Fangio won the race and his first title as the 33-years-old Ascari became the youngest runner-up. Although Ascari had taken pole position, a disastrous tyre choice for the race saw the Ferraris unable to challenge Fangio; Ascari finished fourth.

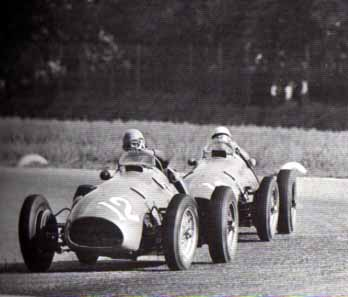
Ascari and Luigi Villoresi in action at the 1952 Italian Grand Prix

For 1952, the World Championship season switched to using the 2-litre Formula Two regulations, with Ascari driving the Ferrari 500. He missed the 1952 Swiss Grand Prix as he was qualifying for the 1952 Indianapolis 500, at the time a World Championship event. He was the only European driver to race at Indy in its eleven years on the World Championship schedule; his race ended after 40 laps without having made much of an impression, as a result of a wheel collapse. Returning to Europe, he then won the remaining six rounds of the series to clinch the world title (also taking five non-championship wins) and recording the fastest lap in each race. He scored the maximum number of points a driver could earn, since only the best four of eight scores counted towards the World Championship. Aged 34, Ascari became Formula One's new youngest champion until the 29-year-old Mike Hawthorn won it in 1958; Hawthorn had been Ascari's teammate in 1951. Meanwhile, Fangio had missed most of the season after a crash in the 1952 Italian Grand Prix in June.

Ascari won three more consecutive races to start the 1953 season, giving him nine straight championship wins (not counting Indy) before his streak ended when he finished fourth at the 1953 French Grand Prix, which proved to be highly competitive. He won twice more later in the year for a second consecutive World Championship, becoming the first two-time champion. Aged 35, he was also the youngest two-time champion and the youngest back-to-back champion, both records beaten by the 34-year-old Jack Brabham in 1960, as the average age of a Formula One driver significantly decreased. The 1953 season is considered Ascari's career high point as he had faced the returning Fangio for the opening race of the season, the 1953 Argentine Grand Prix in Buenos Aires, attended by Fangio's home crowd. Additionally, it was widely expected that Ferrari was to be challenged by a resurgent Maserati, with Fangio at its helm. Instead, Ascari took pole position and achieved the first win of a season that set him on course for his second and last World Championship.

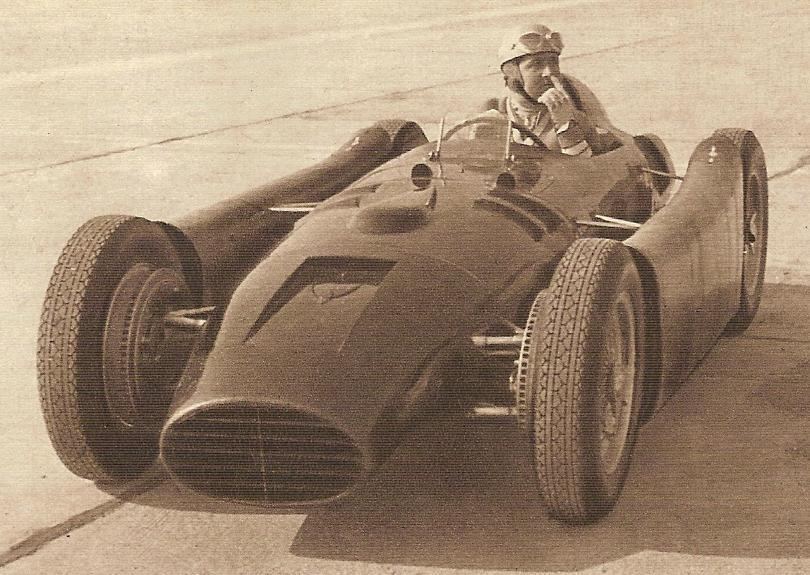
Ascari in the Lancia D50 in 1954

Following a dispute over his salary, Ascari left Ferrari at the end of the season and switched to Lancia for the 1954 campaign. As their car was not eventually ready for the final race of the season, Gianni Lancia allowed him to drive twice for Maserati, sharing the fastest lap at the 1954 British Grand Prix, and once for Ferrari. Ascari also won the Mille Miglia that year, driving a Lancia sportscar, surviving the dreadful weather and the failure of a throttle spring, which was temporarily replaced with a rubber band. When the Lancia D50 was ready, Ascari took pole position on its debut, the 1954 Spanish Grand Prix, and led impressively early on and set fastest lap before retiring with a clutch problem, meaning a full season of competing against Fangio's previously dominant Mercedes was much anticipated. Ascari's decision to move to Lancia is considered his career's low point. Despite promises of a new car and more money, this did not come until the season was nearly over, by which time Fangio was unreachable. While waiting for the Lancia car, Ascari had to take guest drives for Maserati and Ferrari, and he finished the season without completing any of the four Grands Prix he entered.

Ascari's 1955 season started promisingly, the Lancia taking victories at the non-championship races in Turin (Parco del Valentino) and at the Naples Grand Prix, where the Lancias took on and beat the hitherto all-conquering Mercedes. In a world championship event, the 1955 Argentine Grand Prix, he retired. During the 1955 Monaco Grand Prix on 22 May, Ascari crashed into the harbour through hay bales and sandbags late in the race after missing a chicane while leading, reportedly distracted by either the crowd's reaction to Stirling Moss' retirement or the close attentions of the lapped Cesare Perdisa behind. Whatever distracted him, he approached the chicane too quickly, and chose the only way out and took his D50 through the barriers into the sea, missing a substantial iron bollard by about 30 cm. Although his car sank, Ascari was pulled into a boat and escaped with only a broken nose.

== Death ==
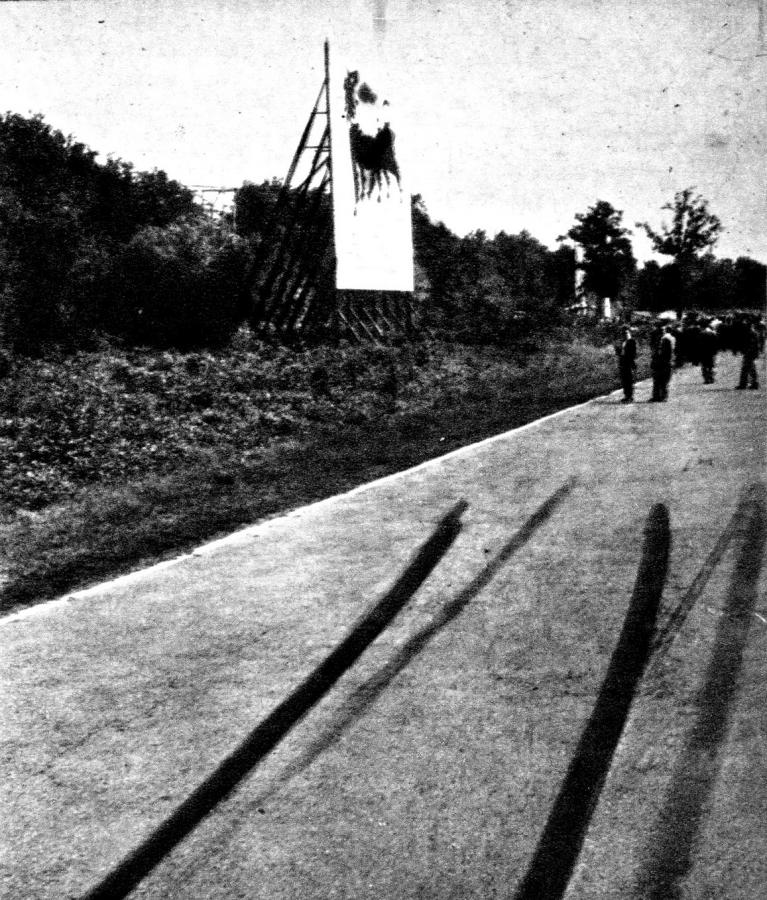
The site of Ascari's fatal accident

On Thursday 26 May 1955, Ascari went to the Autodromo Nazionale Monza to watch his friend Eugenio Castellotti test a Ferrari 750 Monza sports car. They were to co-drive the car in the Agip-sponsored III. Gran Premio Supercortemaggiore 6-hour 1000 km Monza race, having been given special dispensation by his Lancia F1 team which did not compete in sportscar. Ascari was not scheduled to drive that day, but decided to try a few laps. He set off in street clothes and wearing Castellotti's white helmet. As he emerged from a fast curve on the third lap, the car inexplicably skidded, turned on its nose, and somersaulted twice. Thrown out onto the track, Ascari suffered multiple injuries and died a few minutes later. The crash occurred on the kink that led on the back straight, then known as Curva del Vialone, one of the track's challenging high-speed corners. Later it was renamed in his honour, and was subsequently replaced with a chicane called Variante Ascari. The reasons and circumstances of the accident, including why Ascari, who was well known for his attention to safety, drove another driver's car, and without his own lucky blue helmet (he had left it at home, and apparently reasoned that, after his accident in Monaco four days earlier, getting back to race driving as soon as possible was the best way to recover), never came to light.

In 2001, the Swiss newspaper Rinascita published the story of Angelo Consonni, who was seven years old at the time of Ascari's death and was with his grandfather near the Curva del Vialone. Consonni said he saw two workers intent on crossing the road to reach a shed when he heard a car approaching; if the first worker was quick, the second hesitated and stopped. Soon after, the young Consonni felt a silence and saw the Ferrari spin around and overturn. Luigi Villoresi maintained that Ascari would have been afraid of being afraid. In 2014, the racing driver Ernesto Brambilla declared that he had seen the accident, confirming that the car spun around and overturned, excluding the hypothesis that the accident was caused by a spectator who crossed the track.

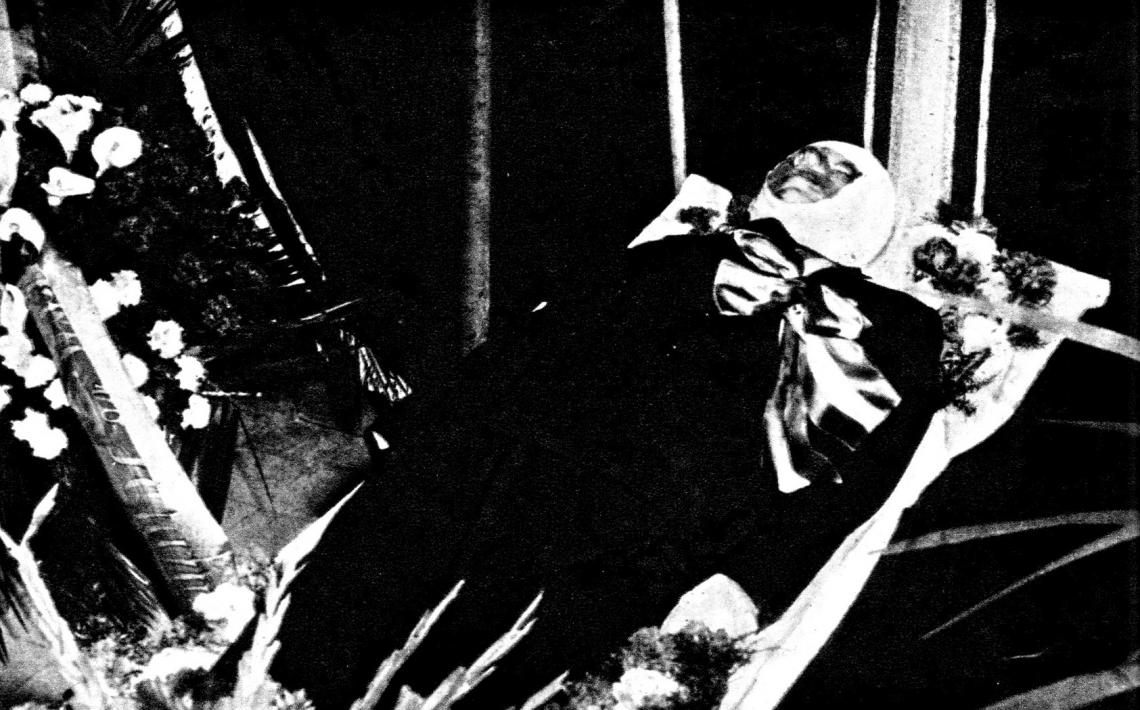
Ascari's funeral

Motor racing fans from all over mourned, as Ascari was buried next to the grave of his father in the Cimitero Monumentale in Milan, to be forever remembered as one of the greatest racers of all time. More than a million people took to the streets in Milan for his funeral. His distraught wife Mietta Ascari told Enzo Ferrari that were it not for their children she would have taken her life. Three days before he died, Ascari had told a friend: "I never want my children to become too fond of me because one day I might not come back and they will suffer less if I don't come back." Upon Ascari's death, his friend and rival Juan Manuel Fangio lamented: "I have lost my greatest opponent. Ascari was a driver of supreme skill and I felt my title last year lost some of its value because he was not there to fight me for it. A great man." Fellow racing driver Stirling Moss recalled Ascari as "wonderfully good... he was rather better than good, he was very good indeed. He may have been as fast as Fangio... but he had not got the polish that so distinguished Fangio." Mike Hawthorn said that "Ascari was the fastest driver I ever saw. And when I say that, I include Fangio."

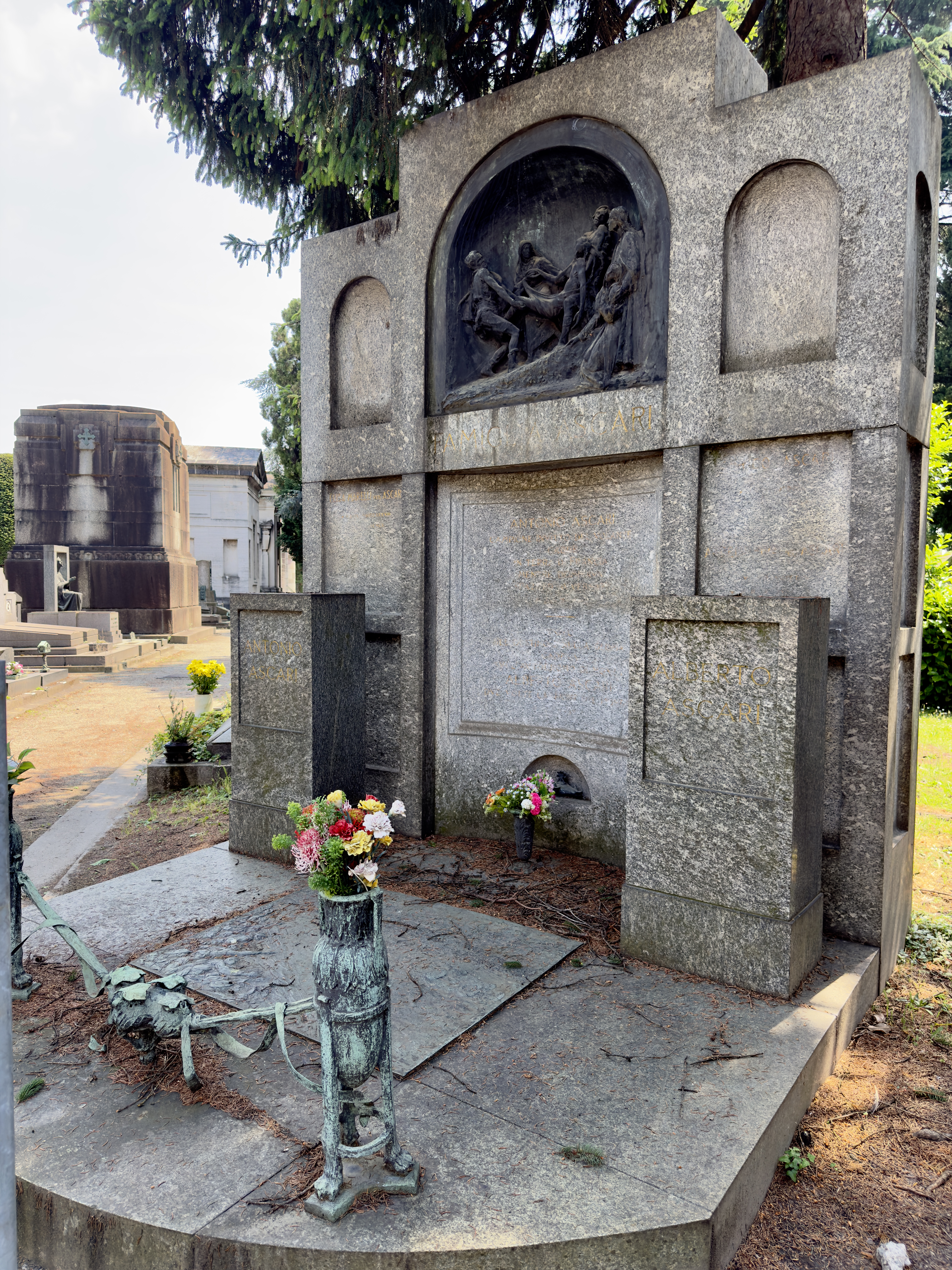
Antonio and Alberto Ascari's graves

Ascari's death is often considered to be a contributing factor to the withdrawal of Lancia from motor racing in 1955, just three days after his funeral (although the company was also in considerable financial trouble, needing a government subsidy to survive), handing his team, drivers, cars, and spare parts over to Enzo Ferrari. He died aged 36 years and 10 months, exactly the same age as his father, who was also killed in an accident at Montlhery thirty years earlier. Both Ascaris won 13 Grands Prix, drove car number 26, and were killed in similar circumstances. His father's death helped fuel Ascari's deeply superstitious nature as he avoided black cats, was concerned about unlucky numbers, and did not allow anyone to touch the briefcase that contained his racing apparel, which included what he believed to be his lucky blue helmet and T-shirt, the goggles, and gloves. Ascari had also promised himself, after his father's death, that he would never race on the 26th of any month, and that he would become the number one racing driver. In 2015, Ascari was included in the Walk of Fame of Italian sport. In 2016, unknown thieves stole the bronze busts, which were placed on the sides of the shrine, of Ascari and his father. Ascari's bust was the work of Michele Vedani, while that of his father was created by the sculptor Orazio Grossoni.

== Legacy ==
"When leading, he could not easily be overtaken – indeed it was virtually impossible to overtake him."

— Enzo Ferrari

Ascari was popular with fellow drivers and crowds because of his modesty and eagerness to praise the ability of his rivals; he is also considered one of the hardest drivers to pass. One criticism was the perceived lack of complete focus when he was chasing for the lead. For example, Enzo Ferrari said: "When he had to follow and pass an opponent, he evidently suffered, not from an inferiority complex, but from a nervousness that did not let him express his true class." In the words of BBC Sport's chief Formula One writer Andrew Benson, Ascari did not look "much like the modern idea of a Formula 1 driver. His double chin and slightly chubby frame brought to mind a Milanese baker more than the lean, pinched athletes of the modern age. Yet this was a man who, for a period, dominated grand prix racing like no other has before or since." In his profile about Ascari, Benson further wrote that "Ascari was a ruthless winning machine. He was a phlegmatic character who approached his racing with an analytical style. With his pale blue shirt and matching helmet, Ascari cut a distinctive figure in the scarlet Ferraris of the early 1950s. He sat upright, hunched slightly forward, closer to the large steering wheel than many of his rivals, his elbows forming sharper angles." About Ascari's driving style, Enzo Ferrari said: "Ascari had a precise and distinctive driving style, but he was a man who had to lead from the start. In that position he was hard to overtake, almost impossible to beat, in my estimation. Alberto was secure when he was playing the hare. That was when his style was at its most superb. In second place, or further back, he was less sure."

A street in Rome, in the Esposizione Universale Roma area, is named in Ascari's honour. The Autodromo Nazionale Monza, the Autodromo Oscar Alfredo Gálvez, and the Circuito del Jarama have chicanes or portions of their tracks named after Ascari. In 1972, one of the chicanes at the Monza Circuit was named in his honour Variante Ascari. In 1992, he was inducted into the International Motorsports Hall of Fame. The British sports car manufacturer Ascari Cars, founded in 1994, is named in his honour. Italian-born American racing legend Mario Andretti counts Ascari as one of his racing heroes, having watched him at the Monza circuit in his youth. Ascari was inducted into the FIA Hall of Fame in December 2017. He appears in Mark Sullivan's novel Beneath a Scarlet Sky.

In 34 entries and 32 race starts, Ascari had 13 wins, 17 podiums, 14 pole positions, and 12 fastest laps, and won two World Championships, making him the first double World Champion and the first back-to-back winner; it was not until Michael Schumacher's fourth World Championship (the second with Ferrari) in 2001, the only other to do so, that a Ferrari driver won back-to-back titles. His rivalry with Juan Manuel Fangio was one of the greatest in Formula One; from 31 starts each, they combined for 27 wins, 30 pole positions, and 27 fastest laps, some of which were shared with others. Either Ascari or Fangio held the lead for at least one lap, often times it was both leading races and for more than a lap, in all except for two of the 37 Grands Prix (from the 1950 British Grand Prix to the 1955 Monaco Grand Prix). In total, they led 66.6% of 2,508 laps. Stirling Moss believed Fangio to be better but that Ascari was very close, while Denis Jenkinson of Motor Sport thought Ascari was better. Ascari was also called the prototype Jim Clark, as well as the last Italian Grand Prix star, being Ferrari's sole Italian World Champion and Italy's sole back-to-back champion. Ascari's rivals thought him faster than Fangio. With a win ratio of more than 40%, Ascari was second only to Fangio at the time. With Ferrari, for which he drove from 1949 to 1953, he had 13 wins in 27 races, a ratio of 48%, the highest win ratio for a Ferrari driver.

Despite his short career, having fewer Grand Prix starts than any other World Champion, Ascari is generally considered among the greatest Formula One drivers. In 2009, an Autosport survey taken by 217 Formula One drivers saw Ascari voted as the 16th-greatest Formula One driver of all time. In 2012, the BBC listed Ascari as the 9th-greatest Formula One driver. In 2020, Carteret Analytics used quantitative analysis methods to rank Formula One drivers. According to this ranking, Ascari is Formula One's fourth-best driver of all time. Similar objective mathematical models, such as Eichenberger and Stadelmann (2009, 12th when the 40 races started criteria is dropped), original F1metrics (2014, 9th), FiveThirtyEight (2018, 19th), and updated F1metrics (2019, 5th), consistently put Ascari among the top 20 greatest Formula One drivers ever. Although Fangio did not take part in the 1952 season, Ascari's performance during that season is considered one of the best single-year performance of all time; he overwhelmingly beat several strong Ferrari teammates, including Giuseppe Farina, whom he beat 53.5 to 27 in total points. Based on a 2019 adjusted scoring-rate calculation, 1952 had the all-time largest margin between first and second in the championship standings, with 8.90 points per race for Ascari and 4.36 points per race for Mike Hawthorn.

Into the 21st century, Ascari continues to hold several Formula One records, some of which have since been equalled by fellow World Champions, such as Clark, Nigel Mansell, Sebastian Vettel, and Lewis Hamilton. During his career, Ascari had seven hat-tricks (pole positions, fastest lap, and race win) and five Grand Chelems (1952 French Grand Prix, 1952 German Grand Prix, 1952 Dutch Grand Prix, 1953 Argentine Grand Prix, and 1953 British Grand Prix); as of July 2023, only 26 drivers had secured a Grand Chelem, of which there had been 66 in total. Ascari is one of three drivers (Clark and Vettel) to have achieved this feat, meaning taking pole, fastest lap, race win, and leading every lap, in consecutive races. Ascari holds the records of most consecutive hat-tricks (4), most consecutive Grand Chelems (2, jointly held with Clark and Vettel), highest number of Grand Chelems in a season (3, jointly held with Clark, Mansell, and Hamilton), most consecutive fastest laps (7), most consecutive laps in the lead (304), most consecutive distance led (2,075 km), highest percentage of fastest laps in a season (75%), and highest percentage of possible championship points in a season (100%, jointly held with Clark). A 51-year record for most consecutive wins (7), which was held by Ascari, (Note: Some sources include the subsequent Dutch and Belgian Grands Prix and discount the intervening 1953 Indianapolis 500 on the basis that very few of the European drivers competed in the Indianapolis 500 when it was part of the Drivers' Championship, and thus extend Ascari's sequence to 9 wins.) was first equalled by Schumacher in 2004, then broken by Vettel (9) in 2013, and broken again (10) by Max Verstappen in 2023. He also held the record for the highest percentage of wins in a season (75) until 2023, when Verstappen broke Ascari's 71-year record.

== Racing record ==
=== Career highlights ===
Season	Series	Position	Team	Car
1947	VIII Circuito di Modena	**1st**		Maserati A6GCS
1947	Sehab Almaz Bey Trophy	2nd		Cisitalia-Fiat D46
1948	Gran Premio di San Remo	**1st**		Maserati 4CLT/48
1948	Circuito di Pescara	**1st**		Maserati A6GCS
1948	RAC International Grand Prix	2nd		Maserati 4CLT/48
1948	Grand Prix de l'ACF	3rd		Alfa Romeo 158
1949	Gran Premio del General Juan Perón y de la Ciudad Buenos Aires	**1st**	Scuderia Ambrosiana	Maserati 4CLT
1949	Gran Premio di Bari	**1st**	Scuderia Ferrari	Ferrari 166C
1949	Grand Prix de Suisse	**1st**		Ferrari 125
1949	Coupe des Petites Cylindrées	**1st**	Scuderia Ferrari	Ferrari 166C
1949	Daily Express BRDC International Trophy	**1st**	Scuderia Ferrari	Ferrari 125
1949	Lausanne Grand Prix	**1st**		Ferrari 125
1949	Gran Premio d'Italia	**1st**		Ferrari 125
1949	Gran Premio del General Juan Perón y de la Ciudad Buenos Aires	**1st**	Scuderia Ferrari	Ferrari 166 FL
1949	Copa Acción de San Lorenzo	3rd	Scuderia Ambrosiana	Maserati 4CLT
1949	Grand Prix de Belgique	3rd	Scuderia Ferrari	Ferrari 125
1949	Gran Premio dell'Autodromo di Monza	3rd	Scuderia Ferrari	Ferrari 166C
1950	Gran Premio Internacional del General San Martín	**1st**	Scuderia Ferrari	Ferrari 166 FL
1950	Gran Premio di Modena	**1st**	Scuderia Ferrari	Ferrari 166 F2/50
1950	Grand Prix de Mons	**1st**	Scuderia Ferrari	Ferrari 166 F2/50
1950	Grand Prix de Luxembourg	**1st**	Scuderia Ferrari	Ferrari 166 MM
1950	Gran Premio di Roma	**1st**	Scuderia Ferrari	Ferrari 166 F2/50
1950	Coupe ds Petites Cylindrées	**1st**	Scuderia Ferrari	Ferrari 166 F2/50
1950	Großer Preis von Deutschland	**1st**	Scuderia Ferrari	Ferrari 166 F2/50
1950	Circuito del Garda	**1st**	Scuderia Ferrari	Ferrari 166 F2/50
1950	Grand Premio do Penya Rhin	**1st**	Scuderia Ferrari	Ferrari 375
1950	Grand Prix de Marseilles	2nd	Scuderia Ferrari	Ferrari 166 F2/50
1950	Grand Prix Automobile de Monaco	2nd	Scuderia Ferrari	Ferrari 125
1950	Gran Premio dell'Autodromo di Monza	2nd	Scuderia Ferrari	Ferrari 166 F2/50
1950	Gran Premio d'Italia	2nd	Scuderia Ferrari	Ferrari 125
1950	Grote Prijs van Nederland	3rd	Scuderia Ferrari	Ferrari 166
1950	FIA Formula One World Championship	5th	Scuderia Ferrari	Ferrari 125; Ferrari 166 F2/50; Ferrari 275; Ferrari 375
1951	Rallye del Sestriere	**1st**		Lancia Aurelia
1951	Gran Premio di San Remo	**1st**		Ferrari 375
1951	Gran Premio dell'Autodromo di Monza	**1st**	Scuderia Ferrari	Ferrari 166 F2/50
1951	Gran Premio di Napoli	**1st**	Scuderia Ferrari	Ferrari 166 F2/50
1951	Großer Preis von Deutschland	**1st**	Scuderia Ferrari	Ferrari 375
1951	Gran Premio d'Italia	**1st**	Scuderia Ferrari	Ferrari 375
1951	Gran Premio di Modena	**1st**	Scuderia Ferrari	Ferrari 500
1951	FIA Formula One World Championship	2nd	Scuderia Ferrari	Ferrari 375
1951	Grote Prijs van Belgie	2nd	Scuderia Ferrari	Ferrari 375
1951	Grand Prix de l'A.C.F.	2nd	Scuderia Ferrari	Ferrari 375
1951	Carrera Panamericana	2nd	Centro Deportivo Italiano	Ferrari 212 Inter Vignale
1952	**FIA Drivers World Championship**	**1st**	Scuderia Ferrari	Ferrari 500
1952	Grand Prix de France	**1st**	Scuderia Ferrari	Ferrari 500
1952	Gran Premio di Siracusa	**1st**	Scuderia Ferrari	Ferrari 500
1952	Grand Prix Automobile de Pau	**1st**	Scuderia Ferrari	Ferrari 500
1952	Grand Prix de Marseille	**1st**	Scuderia Ferrari	Ferrari 500
1952	Grote Prijs van Belgie	**1st**	Scuderia Ferrari	Ferrari 500
1952	Grand Prix de l'ACF	**1st**	Scuderia Ferrari	Ferrari 500
1952	RAC British Grand Prix	**1st**	Scuderia Ferrari	Ferrari 500
1952	Großer Preis von Deutschland	**1st**	Scuderia Ferrari	Ferrari 500
1952	Grand Prix du Comminges	**1st**	Scuderia Ferrari	Ferrari 500
1952	Grote Prijs van Nederland	**1st**	Scuderia Ferrari	Ferrari 500
1952	Grand Prix de La Baule	**1st**	Scuderia Ferrari	Ferrari 500
1952	Gran Premio d'Italia	**1st**	Scuderia Ferrari	Ferrari 500
1952	Grand Prix de la Marne	3rd	Scuderia Ferrari	Ferrari 500
1952	Gran Premio di Modena	3rd	Scuderia Ferrari	Ferrari 500
1953	**FIA Drivers World Championship**	**1st**	Scuderia Ferrari	Ferrari 500
1953	Gran Premio de la Republica Argentina	**1st**	Scuderia Ferrari	Ferrari 500
1953	Grand Prix Automobile de Pau	**1st**	Scuderia Ferrari	Ferrari 500
1953	Grand Prix de Bordeaux	**1st**	Scuderia Ferrari	Ferrari 500
1953	Grote Prijs van Nederland	**1st**	Scuderia Ferrari	Ferrari 500
1953	Grote Prijs van Belgie	**1st**	Scuderia Ferrari	Ferrari 500
1953	RAC British Grand Prix	**1st**	Scuderia Ferrari	Ferrari 500
1953	Großer Preis der Schweiz	**1st**	Scuderia Ferrari	Ferrari 500
1953	Internationales ADAC-1000 km Rennen Weltmeisterschaftslauf Nürburgring	**1st**	Automobili Ferrari	Ferrari 375 MM Vignale Spyder
1953	12 Hours of Casablanca	2nd	Scuderia Ferrari	Ferrari 500 Mondial
1954	Mille Miglia	**1st**	Scuderia Lancia	Lancia D24
1954	FIA Formula One World Championship	25th	Officine Alfieri Maserati; Scuderia Ferrari; Scuderia Lancia	Maserati 250F; Ferrari 625; Lancia D50
1955	Gran Premio del Valentino	**1st**	Scuderia Lancia	Lancia D50
1955	Gran Premio di Napoli	**1st**	Scuderia Lancia	Lancia D50

=== Complete Drivers World Championship results ===
(key) (Races in bold indicate pole position; Races in italics indicate fastest lap)

Year	Entrant	Chassis	Engine	1	2	3	4	5	6	7	8	9	WDC	Pts
1950	Scuderia Ferrari	Ferrari 125	Ferrari 125 1.5 V12s	GBR	MON; 2	500	SUI; Ret						5th	11
1950	Scuderia Ferrari	Ferrari 275	Ferrari 275 3.3 V12					BEL; 5	FRA; DNS				5th	11
1950	Scuderia Ferrari	Ferrari 375	Ferrari 375 4.5 V12							ITA; 2*			5th	11
1951	Scuderia Ferrari	Ferrari 375	Ferrari 375 4.5 V12	SUI; 6	500	BEL; 2	FRA; 2†	GBR; Ret	**GER**; 1	ITA; 1	**ESP**; 4		**2nd**	**25 (28)**
1952	Scuderia Ferrari	Ferrari 375S	Ferrari 375 4.5 V12		500; Ret								**1st**	**36 (53 1/2)**
1952	Scuderia Ferrari	Ferrari 500	Ferrari 500 2.0 L4	SUI		**BEL**; 1	**FRA**; 1	GBR; 1	**GER**; 1	**NED**; 1	**ITA**; 1		**1st**	**36 (53 1/2)**
1953	Scuderia Ferrari	Ferrari 500	Ferrari 500 2.0 L4	**ARG**; 1	500; DNA	**NED**; 1	BEL; 1	**FRA**; 4	**GBR**; 1	**GER**; 8‡	SUI; 1	**ITA**; Ret	**1st**	**34 1/2 (46 1/2)**
1954	Officine Alfieri Maserati	Maserati 250F	Maserati 250F1 2.5 L6	ARG	500	BEL	FRA; Ret	GBR; Ret	GER	SUI			25th	1 1/7
1954	Scuderia Ferrari	Ferrari 625	Ferrari 625 2.5 L4								ITA; Ret		25th	1 1/7
1954	Scuderia Lancia	Lancia D50	Lancia DS50 2.5 V8									**ESP**; Ret	25th	1 1/7
1955	Scuderia Lancia	Lancia D50	Lancia DS50 2.5 V8	ARG; Ret	MON; Ret	500	BEL	NED	GBR	ITA			NC	0

* Indicates shared drive with Dorino Serafini
† Indicates shared drive with José Froilán González
‡ Indicates shared drive with Luigi Villoresi

=== Non-championship Formula One results ===
(key) (Races in bold indicate pole position; Races in italics indicate fastest lap)

Year	Entrant	Chassis	Engine	1	2	3	4	5	6	7	8	9	10	11	12	13	14	15	16	17	18	19	20	21	22	23	24	25	26	27	28	29	30	31	32	33	34
1950	Scuderia Ferrari	Ferrari 166 F2-50	Ferrari 166 F2 2.0 V12	PAU; Ret	RIC				BAR; Ret	JER		NED; 3																									
1950	Scuderia Ferrari	Ferrari 125	Ferrari 125 1.5 V12s			**SRM**; Ret	PAR	EMP			ALB; Ret		NAT; 4	NOT	ULS	PES	STT	INT; DNQ	GOO																		
1950	Scuderia Ferrari	Ferrari 375	Ferrari 375 4.5 V12																	**PEN**; 1																	
1951	Scuderia Ferrari	Ferrari 375	Ferrari 375 4.5 V12	**SYR**; Ret	**PAU**; Ret	RIC	**SRM**; 1	BOR	INT	PAR	ULS	SCO	NED	ALB	**PES**; Ret	BAR; Ret	GOO																				
1952	Scuderia Ferrari	Ferrari 500	Ferrari 500 2.0 L4	**SYR**; 1				**PAU**; 1	IBS	**MAR**; 1	AST	INT	ELÄ	NAP	EIF	PAR	ALB	FRO	ULS	**MNZ**; Ret	LAC	ESS	**MAR**; 3*	**SAB**; Ret	CAE	DMT	**COM**; 1†	NAT	**BAU**; 1	MOD; 3‡	CAD	SKA	MAD	AVU	JOE	NEW	
1952	Scuderia Ferrari	Ferrari 375	Ferrari 375 4.5 V12		VAL; 5	RIC	LAV																														
1953	Scuderia Ferrari	Ferrari 500	Ferrari 500 2.0 L4	**SYR**; Ret	**PAU**; 1	LAV	AST	BOR; 1	INT	ELÄ	NAP; 5	ULS	WIN	FRO	COR	EIF																					
1953	Scuderia Ferrari	Ferrari 375	Ferrari 375 4.5 V12														ALB; DNQ	PRI	ESS	MID	ROU	CRY	AVU	USF	LAC	BRI	CHE	SAB	NEW	CAD	RED	SKA	LON	MOD	MAD	JOE	CUR
1955	Scuderia Lancia	Lancia D50	Lancia DS50 2.5 V8	**VAL**; 1	**PAU**; 5	GLO	BOR	INT	**NAP**; 1	ALB	CUR	COR	LON	DRT	RED	DTT	OUL	AVO	SYR																		

* Indicates shared drive with Luigi Villoresi
† Indicates shared drive with André Simon
‡ Indicates shared drive with Sergio Sighinolfi

=== Complete 24 Hours of Le Mans results ===
Year	Team	Co-Drivers	Car	Class	Laps	Pos.	Class Pos.
1952	(Italy) Scuderia Ferrari	(Italy) Luigi Villoresi	Ferrari 250 S Berlinetta Vignale	S3.0		DNF	DNF
1953	(Italy) Scuderia Ferrari	(Italy) Luigi Villoresi	Ferrari 340 MM Pininfarina Berlinetta	S5.0	229	DNF	DNF

=== Complete 12 Hours of Sebring results ===
Year	Team	Co-Drivers	Car	Class	Laps	Pos.	Class Pos.
1954	(Italy) Scuderia Lancia Co.	(Italy) Luigi Villoresi	Lancia D24	S5.0	87	DNF	DNF

=== Complete 24 Hours of Spa results ===
Year	Team	Co-Drivers	Car	Class	Laps	Pos.	Class Pos.
1953	(Italy) Scuderia Ferrari	(Italy) Luigi Villoresi	Ferrari 375 MM Pininfarina Berlinetta	S	216	DNF	DNF

=== Complete Mille Miglia results ===
Year	Team	Co-Drivers	Car	Class	Pos.	Class Pos.
1940	(Italy) Alberto Ascari	(Italy) Giovanni Minozzi	Auto Avio Costruzioni 815	1.5	DNF	DNF
1948	(Italy) Scuderia Ambrosiana	(Italy) Guerino Bertocchi	Maserati A6GCS	S2./+2.0	DNF	DNF
1950	(Italy) Scuderia Ferrari	(Italy) Senesio Nicolini	Ferrari 275 S Barchetta Touring	S+2.0	DNF	DNF
1951	(Italy) Scuderia Ferrari	(Italy) Senesio Nicolini	Ferrari 340 America Barchetta Touring	S/GT+2.0	DNF	DNF
1954	(Italy) Scuderia Lancia		Lancia D24	S+2.0	**1st**	**1st**

=== Complete Carrera Panamericana results ===
Year	Team	Co-Drivers	Car	Class	Pos.	Class Pos.
1951	(Mexico) Centro Deportivo Italian	(Italy) Luigi Villoresi	Ferrari 212 Inter Vignale	IC	**2nd**	**2nd**
1952	(Mexico) Industrias 1-2-3	(Italy) Giuseppe Scotuzzi	Ferrari 340 Mexico Vignale Spyder	S	DNF	DNF

=== Complete 12 Hours of Casablanca results ===
Year	Team	Co-Drivers	Car	Class	Pos.	Class Pos.
1953	(Italy) Scuderia Ferrari	(Portugal) Casimiro de Oliveira	Ferrari 375 MM	S+2.0	DNS	DNS
1953	(Italy) Scuderia Ferrari	(Italy) Luigi Villoresi	Ferrari 500 Mondial	S2.0	**2nd**	**1st**

=== Indianapolis 500 results ===
Year	Chassis	Engine	Start	Finish	Team	Ref
1952	Ferrari 375 Special	Ferrari	19	31	Scuderia Ferrari	

=== Formula One records ===
Ascari holds the following Formula One records:

Record		Achieved	Ref
Most consecutive fastest laps	7	1952 Belgian Grand Prix – 1953 Argentine Grand Prix	
Highest percentage of fastest laps in a season	75% (1952, 6 out of 8)	1952	
Most consecutive laps in the lead	304	1952 Belgian Grand Prix – 1952 Dutch Grand Prix	
Most consecutive distance led	2,075	1952 Belgian Grand Prix – 1952 Dutch Grand Prix	
Most consecutive hat-tricks	4	1952 German Grand Prix – 1953 Argentine Grand Prix	
Most grand slams in a season	3 (1952) (Note: Record shared with Jim Clark (1963 and 1965), Nigel Mansell (1992), and Lewis Hamilton (2017).)	1952 German Grand Prix – 1952 Dutch Grand Prix	
Most consecutive grand slams	2 (Note: Record shared with Jim Clark (1963 and 1965) and Sebastian Vettel (2013).)	1952 German Grand Prix – 1952 Dutch Grand Prix	
Highest percentage of possible championship points in a season	100% (1952, 36 out of 36) (Note: In 1952, only the best four of eight scores counted towards the World Championship. The record is shared with Jim Clark (1963 and 1965).)	1952	

Footnotes

== See also ==
- Peter Collins (racing driver)

== Notes ==
Awards and achievements
Sporting positions
Preceded by Inaugural	BRDC International Trophy; Winner; 1949	Succeeded by Giuseppe Farina
Preceded by Chico Landi	Gran Premio di Bari; Winner; 1949	Succeeded by Giuseppe Farina
Preceded by Franco Cortese	Gran Premio di Napoli; Winner; 1951	Succeeded by Giuseppe Farina
Preceded by Juan Manuel Fangio	Formula One World Champion; 1952–1953	Succeeded by Juan Manuel Fangio
Preceded by Gianni Marzotto; Marco Crosara	Mille Miglia; Winner; 1954	Succeeded by Stirling Moss; Denis Jenkinson
Preceded by Luigi Musso	Gran Premio di Napoli; Winner; 1955	Succeeded by Robert Manzon
Records
Preceded by Reg Parnell; 38 years, 315 days (1950 British GP)	Youngest driver to score a podium position in Formula One; 31 years, 312 days (1950 Monaco Grand Prix)	Succeeded by Manny Ayulo; 29 years, 221 days (1951 Indianapolis 500)
Preceded by Reg Parnell; 38 years, 315 days (1950 British GP)	Youngest driver to score points in Formula One; 31 years, 312 days (1950 Monaco Grand Prix)	Succeeded by Cecil Green; 30 years, 242 days (1950 Indianapolis 500)
Preceded by Juan Manuel Fangio; 6 wins (1950 – 1952)	Most Grand Prix wins 13 wins, 7th at the 1952 Dutch GP	Succeeded by Juan Manuel Fangio; 24 wins, 14th at the 1955 Argentine GP
Preceded by Juan Manuel Fangio; 39 years, 71 days (1950 season)	Youngest Formula One; World Drivers' Championship runner-up 33 years, 107 days (1951 season)	Succeeded by José Froilán González; 32 years, 19 days (1954 season)
Preceded by Juan Manuel Fangio; 40 years, 126 days (1951 season)	Youngest Formula One; World Drivers' Champion; 34 years, 16 days (1952 season)	Succeeded by Mike Hawthorn; 29 years, 192 days (1958 season)
