= Benedicto Campos =

Argentine racing driver

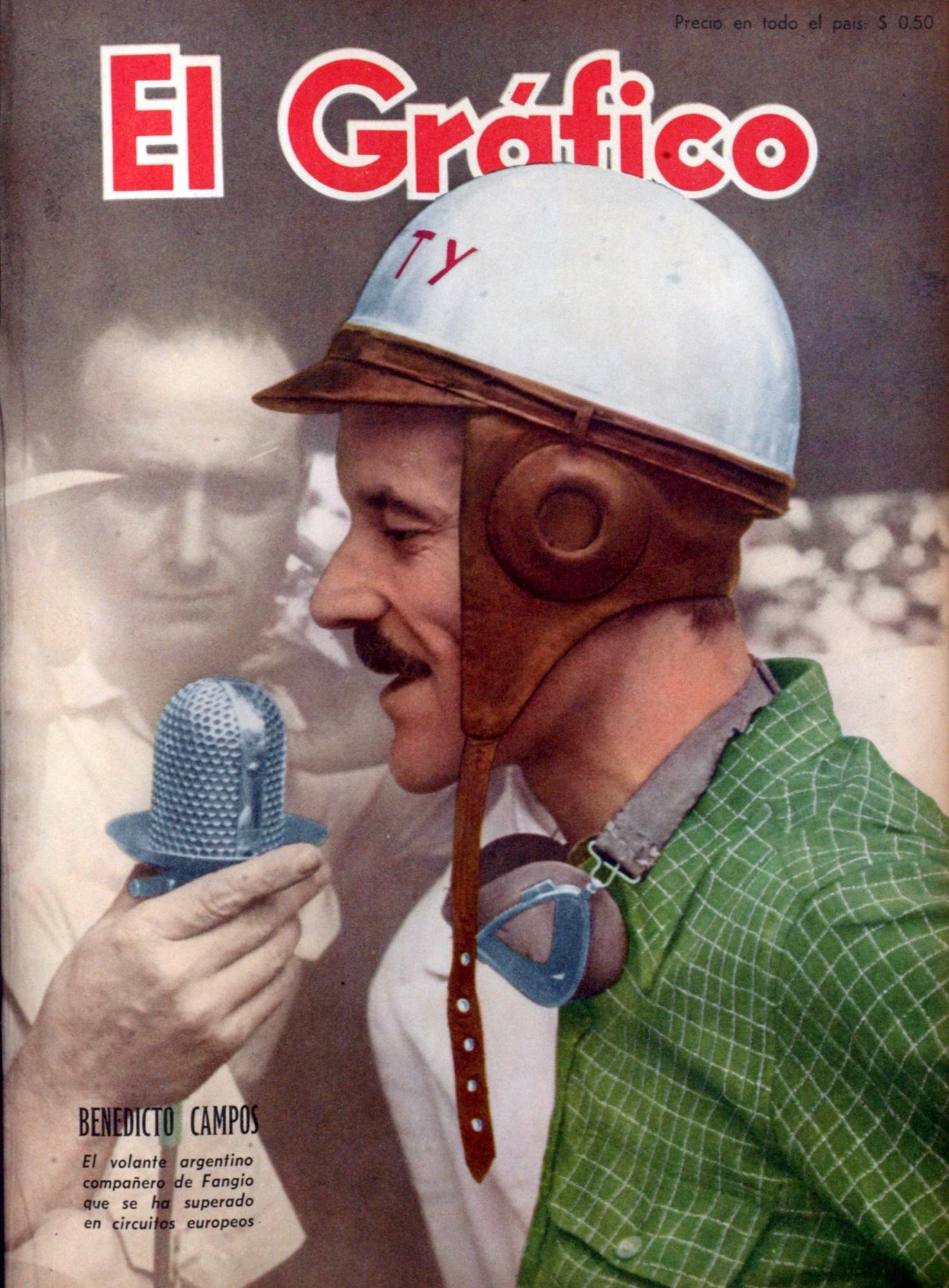
Benedicto Campos

Benedicto Campos (October 27, 1912 in Quequén – February 8, 1972 in Chascomús) was an Argentine racing driver.
