= Oscar Alfredo Gálvez =

Argentine racing driver (1913–1989)

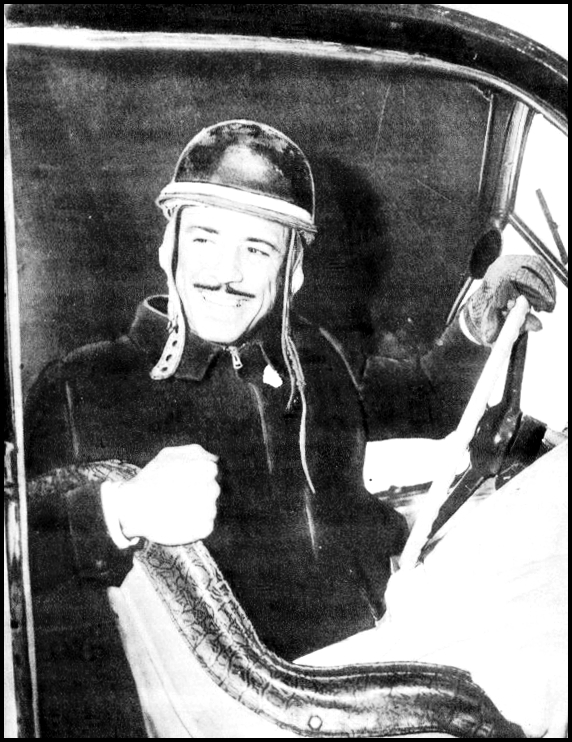
- Born: 17 August 1913; Buenos Aires, Argentina
- Died: 16 December 1989 (aged 76); San Isidro, Buenos Aires, Argentina

Formula One World Championship career
- Nationality: (Argentina) Argentine
- Active years: 1953
- Team: Maserati
- Entries: 1
- Championships: 0
- Wins: 0
- Podiums: 0
- Career points: 2
- Pole positions: 0
- Fastest laps: 0
- First entry: 1953 Argentine Grand Prix

Oscar Alfredo Gálvez (17 August 1913 – 16 December 1989) was an Argentine racing driver, known best for participating – and for scoring two championship points – in the Formula One World Championship Grand Prix on 18 January 1953.

== Life and career ==
Gálvez was born in Buenos Aires, Argentina on 17 August 1913.

A popular driver, Gálvez was a regular entrant and multiple-time champion in the Turismo Carretera series, like his brother, Juan.

Gálvez often raced in vehicles manufactured by Ford. One of the most famous instances occurred in 1960, when he won the Argentine Highway Grand Prix – an annual race which, that year, consisted of 2,860 miles (4,600 km) of Argentine highways for its course. Gálvez participated in the Argentine Highway Grand Prix several times.

== Death and legacy ==
Gálvez on 16 December 1989 from pancreatic cancer, at the age of 76. The Buenos Aires circuit was renamed with his and his brother's name.

== Complete Formula One results ==
(key)

Year	Entrant	Chassis	Engine	1	2	3	4	5	6	7	8	9	WDC	Points
1953	Officine Alfieri Maserati	Maserati A6GCM	Maserati Straight-6	ARG; 5	500	NED	BEL	FRA	GBR	GER	SUI	ITA	15th	2
