= 1948 Grand Prix de Suisse Orientale =

1948 Suisse Orientale Grand Prix

Race details
- Date: 8 August 1948
- Official name: Preis von Ostschweiz-Erlen
- Location: Erlen, Switzerland
- Course: Temporary street circuit
- Course length: 2.8 kilometres (1.7 miles)
- Distance: 50 laps, 140.0 kilometres (87.0 miles)

Pole position
Driver	(Switzerland) Emmanuel de Graffenried	Maserati
- Time: 1:26.8

Fastest lap
Driver	(Switzerland) Emmanuel de Graffenried	Maserati
- Time: 1:31.6

Podium
First	(Switzerland) Emmanuel de Graffenried	Maserati
Second	(Switzerland) Rudi Fischer	Gordini
Third	(Switzerland) Walter Wüst	Cisitalia

The 1948 Preis von Ostschweiz-Erlen was a Formula One motor race held on 8 August 1948 over 50 laps of a street circuit in Erlen, Switzerland. Emmanuel de Graffenried, driving a Maserati 4CL, started from pole, set fastest lap and won the race. Rudi Fischer was second in a Simca Gordini Type 11, and Walter Wüst was third in a Cisitalia D46-Fiat.

== Result ==
Pos	No	Driver	Entrant	Car	Time	Grid
1	12	(Switzerland) Emmanuel de Graffenried	Emmanuel de Graffenried	Maserati 4CL	1:22:14.8	1
2	6	(Switzerland) Rudi Fischer	Ecurie Espadon	Simca Gordini Type 11	+1:17.8	3
3	8	(Switzerland) Walter Wüst	Walter Wüst	Cisitalia D46-Fiat	+2 laps	4
4	16	(Switzerland) Toni Branca	Toni Branca	Maserati 4CL	+3 laps	2
5	10	(Switzerland) Humbert Joly	Humbert Joly	Cisitalia D46-Fiat	+7 laps	8
Ret	4	(Switzerland) André Canonica	Ecurie Autosport	Cisitalia D46-Fiat	12 laps	7
Ret	22	(Switzerland) Richard Ramseyer	Ecurie Autosport	Maserati 4CL	8 laps, gearbox	6
Ret	2	(Switzerland) Claude Bernheim	Ecurie Autosport	Cisitalia D46-Fiat	1 lap, engine	5
DNS	18	(Switzerland) Max Renz	S. Hansen	BMW Eigenbau		9
DNA	14	(Switzerland) Frank Séchehaye	Emmanuel de Graffenried	Maserati 4CL		
DNA	20	(Switzerland) Hans Kaufmann	Hans Kaufmann	Maserati 4CL		

Previous race: 1948 Zandvoort Grand Prix	Formula One non-championship races 1948 season	Next race: 1948 Comminges Grand Prix
Previous race: —	Grand Prix de Suisse Orientale	Next race: 1949 Grand Prix de Suisse Orientale
