= Roberto Vallone =

Italian racing driver

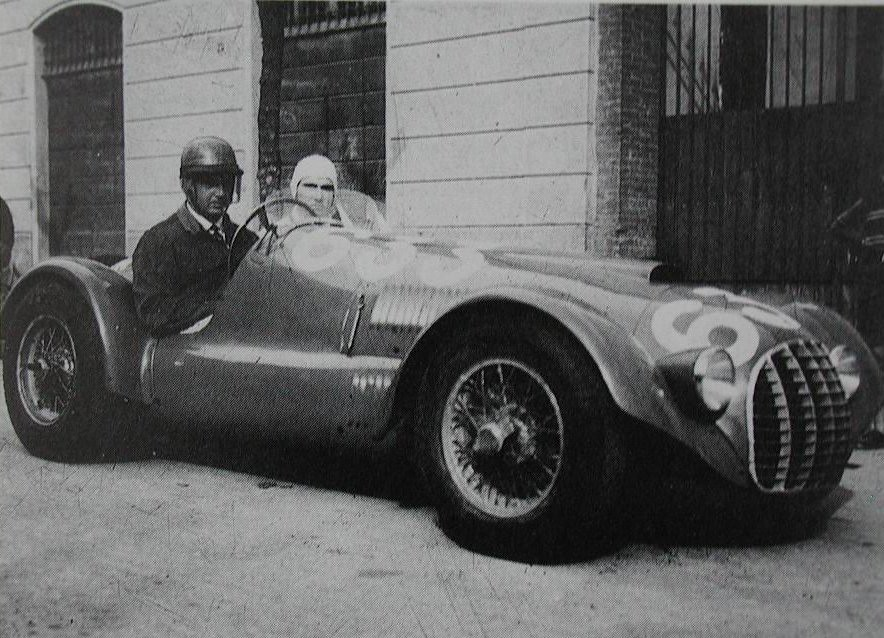
Vallone at the wheel of Ferrari 166 s/n 0012M with co-driver Sergio Sighinolfi at 1949 Mille Miglia

Roberto Vallone (28 June 1915 – 21 June 2001) was an Italian racing driver mostly known for his early association with Scuderia Ferrari.

He entered 13 sports car races (with 12 starts) between 1947 and 1953, mainly in a Stanguellini S1500 and Ferrari 166's that he entered as a privateer. His best season was 1949, when he won three races (the Grand Prix of Naples, Giro dell'Umbria and Coppa d' Oro delle Dolomiti) within four weeks.

Vallone also competed in two non-championship Formula 1 races (the Gran Premio di San Remo in 1949 and the V San Remo Grand Prix) in 1950. He also participated to a Formula Libre event and a Formula 2 race.

Prior to his career in motor racing, he had a brief spell in politics in his native Apulia, when he was mayor of Nardò, a suburb of Lecce. His wife was the artist Carla Lavatelli.

== Complete results ==
Year	Date	Race	Circuit	Entrant	Car	Teammate(s)	Result
1947	April 13	1947 San Remo Grand Prix	Circuito di Ospedaletti	-	-	-	DNS
1948	June 29	Giro Automobilistico dell'Umbria	-	Roberto Vallone	Stanguellini S1500	none	DNF
1948	July 11	Coppa d' Oro delle Dolomiti	-	Roberto Vallone	Stanguellini S1500	none	10th
1948	August 15	Circuito di Pescara	Pescara Circuit	-	Stanguellini S1500	-	DNF
1949	March 20	Targa Florio	Grande Circuito Madonie / Gran Messina	-	Ferrari 166 SC	Sergio Sighinolfi	DNF
1949	April 3	1949 San Remo Grand Prix (Formula 1)	Circuito di Ospedaletti	Scuderia Lazio	Ferrari 166 Inter	none	8th
1949	April 24	Mille Miglia	Brescia-Rome-Brescia	-	Ferrari 166 SC	Sergio Sighinolfi	DNF
1949	May 14	1949 Marseille Grand Prix (Formula Libre)	Parc Borély	Scuderia Lazio	Ferrari 166 Inter	-	8th
1949	June 19	II Gran Premio di Napoli	Posillipo Park	-	Ferrari 166 SC	-	1st
1949	June 29	Giro Automobilistico dell'Umbria	-	-	Ferrari 166 SC	Franco Meloni	1st
1949	July 17	Coppa d' Oro delle Dolomiti	-	Roberto Vallone	Ferrari 166 SC	Franco Meloni	1st
1949	August 15	Circuito di Pescara	Pescara Circuit	Roberto Vallone	Ferrari 166 SC	none	2nd
1950	March 19	1950 Marseille Grand Prix (Formula 2)	Avenue du Prado	Scuderia Ferrari	Ferrari 166 F2/50	Luigi Villoresi; Alberto Ascari; Giovanni Bracco	9th
1950	April 16	1950 San Remo Grand Prix (Formula 1)	Circuito di Ospedaletti	Scuderia Ferrari	Ferrari 166 F2	Luigi Villoresi; Alberto Ascari; Giovanni Bracco; Dorino Serafini; Raymond Sommer	4th
1950	June 11	Gran Premio di Roma	Terme di Caracalla Circuit	-	Ferrari	-	3rd
1951	April 29	Mille Miglia	Brescia-Rome-Brescia	-	Lancia Aurelia	Franco Meloni	25th
1953	April 26	Mille Miglia	Brescia-Rome-Brescia	-	Ferrari-Abarth 166 MM/53	Michelangelo Leonardi	DNF
