= 1948 Grand Prix season =

Third post-war year for Grand Prix racing

Seasons
- ← 1947 1949 →

The 1948 Grand Prix season was the third post-war year for Grand Prix racing. It was the second season of the FIA's Formula One motor racing, though some of that season's Grand Prix still used other formulas. There was no organised championship in 1948, although several of the more prestigious races were recognised as Grandes Épreuves (great trials) by the FIA. Luigi Villoresi proved to be the most successful driver, for the second consecutive year, winning six Grands Prix. Maserati's cars proved difficult to beat, winning 13 of the season's 23 Grands Prix.

== Season review ==
=== Grandes Épreuves ===
Date	Name	Circuit	Pole position	Fastest lap	Winning driver	Winning constructor	Report
16 May	Monaco Grand Prix	Monaco	(Italy) Giuseppe Farina	(Italy) Giuseppe Farina	(Italy) Giuseppe Farina	Maserati	Report
4 July	(Switzerland) Swiss Grand Prix	Bremgarten	(France) Jean-Pierre Wimille	(France) Jean-Pierre Wimille	(Italy) Carlo Felice Trossi	Alfa Romeo	Report
18 July	(France) French Grand Prix	Reims-Gueux	(France) Jean-Pierre Wimille	(France) Jean-Pierre Wimille	(France) Jean-Pierre Wimille	Alfa Romeo	Report
5 September	(Italy) Italian Grand Prix	Torino	(France) Jean-Pierre Wimille	(France) Jean-Pierre Wimille	(France) Jean-Pierre Wimille	Alfa Romeo	Report

=== Other Grands Prix ===
Date	Name	Circuit	Winning driver	Winning constructor	Report
17 January	(Argentina) II Gran Premio del General Juan Perón y de la Ciudad de Buenos Aires	Palermo	(Italy) Luigi Villoresi	Maserati	Report
14 February	(Argentina) II Gran Premio de Eva Duarte Perón (Gran Premio Dalmiro Varela Castex)	Palermo	(Italy) Luigi Villoresi	Maserati	Report
29 March	(France) IX Grand Prix Automobile de Pau	Pau	(Italy) Nello Pagani	Maserati	Report
29 April	II Jersey Road Race	St Helier	(United Kingdom) Bob Gerard	ERA	Report
2 May	(Switzerland) II Grand Prix des Nations	Geneva	(Italy) Giuseppe Farina	Maserati	Report
25 May	(United Kingdom) X British Empire Trophy	Douglas	(United Kingdom) Geoff Ansell	ERA	Report
30 May	(France) II Grand Prix de Paris	Linas-Montlhéry	(France) Yves Giraud-Cabantous	Talbot-Lago	Report
30 May	(Sweden) Stockholm Grand Prix	Skarpnäck Airfield	(Thailand) B. Bira	Simca-Gordini	Report
27 June	(Italy) III Gran Premio di San Remo	Ospedaletti	(Italy) Alberto Ascari	Maserati	Report
7 August	(Netherlands) I Grote Prijs van Zandvoort	Zandvoort	(Thailand) B. Bira	Maserati	Report
8 August	(France) XIV Grand Prix du Comminges	Saint-Gaudens	(Italy) Luigi Villoresi	Maserati	Report
8 August	(Switzerland) Grand Prix de Suisse Orientale	Erlen	(Switzerland) Toulo de Graffenried	Maserati	Report
29 August	(France) X Grand Prix de l'Albigeois	Albi	(Italy) Luigi Villoresi	Maserati	Report
18 September	(United Kingdom) Goodwood Trophy	Goodwood	(United Kingdom) Reg Parnell	Maserati	Report
2 October	(United Kingdom) British Grand Prix	Silverstone	(Italy) Luigi Villoresi	Maserati	Report
10 October	(France) IV Grand Prix du Salon	Linas-Montlhéry	(France) Louis Rosier	Talbot-Lago	Report
17 October	(Italy) Gran Premio di Monza	Monza	(France) Jean-Pierre Wimille	Alfa Romeo	Report
24 October	(Italy) Circuito del Garda	Salò	(Italy) Giuseppe Farina	Ferrari	Report
31 October	(Spain) IX Gran Premio de Penya Rhin	Pedralbes	(Italy) Luigi Villoresi	Maserati	Report

== Statistics ==
=== Grand Prix Winners ===
==== Drivers ====
Driver	Wins	
Driver	Total	Grandes Épreuves
Luigi Villoresi	6	0
Jean-Pierre Wimille	3	2
Giuseppe Farina	3	1
B. Bira	2	0
Carlo Felice Trossi	1	1
Nello Pagani	1	0
Bob Gerard	1	0
Geoff Ansell	1	0
Yves Giraud-Cabantous	1	0
Alberto Ascari	1	0
Toulo de Graffenried	1	0
Reg Parnell	1	0
Louis Rosier	1	0

==== Manufacturers ====
Manufacturer	Wins	
Manufacturer	Total	Grandes Épreuves
Maserati	13	1
Alfa Romeo	4	3
ERA	2	0
Talbot-Lago-Talbot	2	0
Simca-Gordini	1	0
Ferrari	1	0
