= 1949 San Remo Grand Prix =

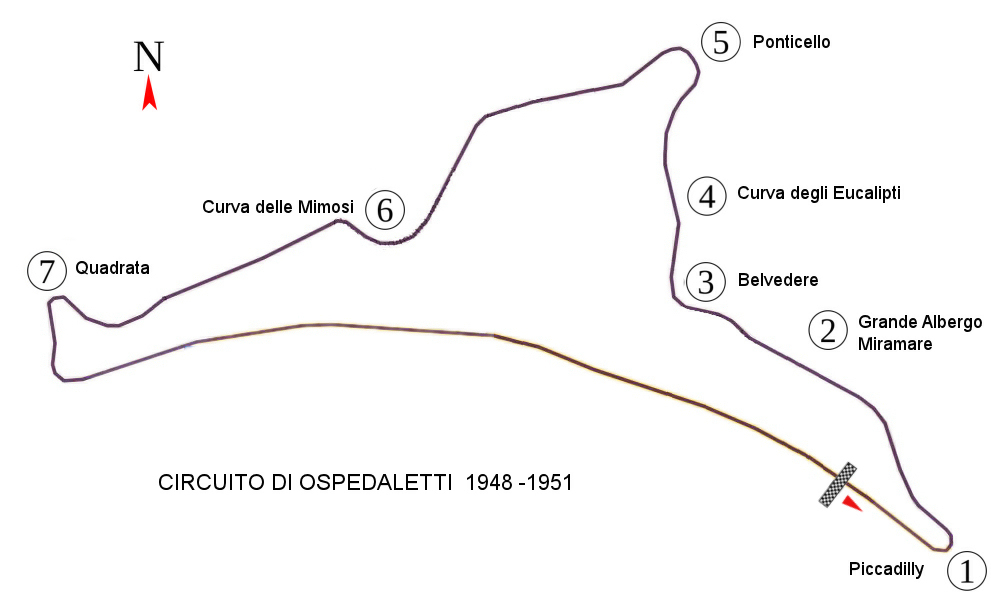

Race details
- Date: 3 April 1949
- Official name: IV Gran Premio di San Remo
- Location: San Remo, Italy
- Course: Ospedaletti
- Course length: 3.380 km (2.100 miles)
- Distance: 90 laps, 304.200 km (189.021 miles)

Pole position
Driver	(Argentina) Juan Manuel Fangio	Maserati

Fastest lap
Driver	(Thailand) B. Bira	Maserati
- Time: 1:56.0

Podium
First	(Argentina) Juan Manuel Fangio	Maserati
Second	(Thailand) B. Bira	Maserati
Third	(Switzerland) Toulo de Graffenried	Maserati

The 1949 San Remo Grand Prix was a Grand Prix motor race held at San Remo on 3 April 1949. The race, held over two heats, was won by Juan Manuel Fangio.

== Entries ==
No	Driver	Entrant	Constructor	Chassis	Engine
4	(Allied-occupied Germany) Ludwig Fischer	Private	Simca-Gordini	Simca-Gordini T11	Gordini L4
6	(France) Louis Rosier	Private	Talbot-Lago	Talbot-Lago T26C	Talbot L6
8	(France) Pierre Levegh	Private	Talbot-Lago	Talbot-Lago T26C	Talbot L6
10	(Italy) Bruno Sterzi	Private	Ferrari	Ferrari 166SC	Ferrari V12
12	(Italy) Giovanni Bracco	Private	Ferrari	Ferrari 166C	Ferrari V12
14	(United Kingdom) Peter Whitehead	Scuderia Ferrari	Ferrari	Ferrari 125	Ferrari V12s
16	(Italy) Discoride Lanza	Scuderia Dimiex	Maserati	Maserati 4CL	Maserati L4s
18	(Argentina) Juan Manuel Fangio	Automóvil Club Argentino	Maserati	Maserati 4CLT/48	Maserati L4s
20	(Italy) Nello Pagani	Scuderia Enrico Platé	Maserati	Maserati 4CL	Maserati L4s
22	(Monaco) Louis Chiron	Automóvil Club Argentino	Simca-Gordini	Simca-Gordini T15	Gordini L4
24	(France) Raymond Sommer	Scuderia Ferrari	Ferrari	Ferrari 125	Ferrari V12s
26	(Switzerland) Frank Séchehaye	Scuderia Enrico Platé	Maserati	Maserati 4CL	Maserati L4s
28	(Thailand) B. Bira	Scuderia Ambrosiana	Maserati	Maserati 4CLT/48	Maserati L4s
30	(Switzerland) Toulo de Graffenried	Enrico Platé	Maserati	Maserati 4CLT/48	Maserati L4s
32	(Italy) Piero Carini	Private	Maserati	Maserati A6GCS	Maserati L6
34	(Argentina) Benedicto Campos	Automóvil Club Argentino	Maserati	Maserati 4CLT/48	Maserati L4s
36	(United Kingdom) Fred Ashmore	Scuderia Ambrosiana	Maserati	Maserati 4CLT/48	Maserati L4s
40	(France) Eugène Chaboud	Scuderia Dimiex	Maserati	Maserati 4CL	Maserati L4s
42	(Italy) Felice Bonetto	Scuderia Ferrari	Ferrari	Ferrari 166C	Ferrari V12
44	(Italy) Ferdinando Righetti	Private	Ferrari	Ferrari 166SC	Ferrari V12
48	(Italy) Roberto Vallone	Scuderia Lazio	Ferrari	Ferrari 166 Inter	Ferrari V12
52	(Italy) Emilio Romano	Private	Maserati	Maserati A6GCS	Maserati L6

== Classification ==
=== First heat ===
Pos	No	Driver	Constructor	Laps	Time/Retired	Grid
1	18	(Argentina) Juan Manuel Fangio	Maserati	45	1:31:33.4	2
2	28	(Thailand) B. Bira	Maserati	45	+ 9.6	1
3	30	(Switzerland) Toulo de Graffenried	Maserati	45	+ 59.4	4
4	42	(Italy) Felice Bonetto	Ferrari	45	+ 1:00.6	8
5	34	(Argentina) Benedicto Campos	Maserati	44	+ 1 Lap	5
6	14	(United Kingdom) Peter Whitehead	Ferrari	44	+ 1 Lap	10
7	12	(Italy) Giovanni Bracco	Ferrari	44	+ 1 Lap	15
8	10	(Italy) Bruno Sterzi	Ferrari	43	+ 2 Laps	19
9	32	(Italy) Piero Carini	Maserati	42	+ 3 Laps	18
10	8	(France) Pierre Levegh	Talbot-Lago-Talbot	41	+ 4 Laps	21
11	48	(Italy) Roberto Vallone	Ferrari	41	+ 4 Laps	12
Ret	40	(France) Eugène Chaboud	Maserati	38	?	17
Ret	24	(France) Raymond Sommer	Ferrari	37	Cylinder head gasket	3
Ret	36	(United Kingdom) Fred Ashmore	Maserati	34	Gearbox	14
Ret	16	(Italy) Discoride Lanza	Maserati	25	accident	11
Ret	6	(France) Louis Rosier	Talbot-Lago-Talbot	25	Accident	13
Ret	26	(Switzerland) Frank Séchehaye	Maserati	23	Gear box	22
Ret	52	(Italy) Emilio Romano	Maserati	19	Valve	20
Ret	20	(Italy) Nello Pagani	Maserati	15	Valve	9
Ret	4	(Allied-occupied Germany) Ludwig Fischer	Simca-Gordini	10	Engine	6
Ret	44	(Italy) Ferdinando Righetti	Ferrari	10	Cylinder head gasket	7
Ret	22	(Monaco) Louis Chiron	Simca-Gordini	9	Accident	16

=== Second heat ===
Pos	No	Driver	Constructor	Laps	Time/Retired	Grid
1	18	(Argentina) Juan Manuel Fangio	Maserati	45	1:29:55.2	1
2	28	(Thailand) B. Bira	Maserati	45	+ 25.8	2
3	34	(Argentina) Benedicto Campos	Maserati	45	+ 1:46.2	5
4	30	(Switzerland) Toulo de Graffenried	Maserati	45	+ 2:22.0	3
5	42	(Italy) Felice Bonetto	Ferrari	44	+ 1 Lap	4
6	48	(Italy) Roberto Vallone	Ferrari	42	+ 3 Laps	11
7	32	(Italy) Piero Carini	Maserati	42	+ 3 Laps	9
8	12	(Italy) Giovanni Bracco	Ferrari	41	+ 4 Laps	7
9	26	(Switzerland) Frank Séchehaye	Maserati	40	+ 5 Laps	15
Ret	40	(France) Eugène Chaboud	Maserati	31	?	12
Ret	8	(France) Pierre Levegh	Talbot-Lago-Talbot	15	?	10
Ret	16	(Italy) Discoride Lanza	Maserati	7	?	14
Ret	14	(United Kingdom) Peter Whitehead	Ferrari	6	?	6
DNS	24	(France) Raymond Sommer	Ferrari			13
DNS	10	(Italy) Bruno Sterzi	Ferrari			8

=== Aggregate ===
Pos	No	Driver	Constructor	Laps	Time/Retired
1	18	(Argentina) Juan Manuel Fangio	Maserati	90	3:01:28.6
2	28	(Thailand) B. Bira	Maserati	90	+ 35.4
3	30	(Switzerland) Toulo de Graffenried	Maserati	89	+ 1 Lap
4	34	(Argentina) Benedicto Campos	Maserati	89	+ 1 Lap
5	42	(Italy) Felice Bonetto	Ferrari	88	+ 2 Laps
6	12	(Italy) Giovanni Bracco	Ferrari	85	+ 5 Laps
7	32	(Italy) Piero Carini	Maserati	84	+ 6 Laps
8	48	(Italy) Roberto Vallone	Ferrari	83	+ 7 Laps
9	40	(France) Eugène Chaboud	Maserati	69	+ 21 Laps
10	26	(Switzerland) Frank Séchehaye	Maserati	63	+ 27 Laps
Ret	8	(France) Pierre Levegh	Talbot-Lago-Talbot	56	?
Ret	14	(United Kingdom) Peter Whitehead	Ferrari	50	?
Ret	10	(Italy) Bruno Sterzi	Ferrari	43	?
Ret	24	(France) Raymond Sommer	Ferrari	37	Cylinder head gasket
Ret	36	(United Kingdom) Fred Ashmore	Maserati	34	Gearbox
Ret	16	(Italy) Discoride Lanza	Maserati	32	?
Ret	6	(France) Louis Rosier	Talbot-Lago-Talbot	25	Accident
Ret	52	(Italy) Emilio Romano	Maserati	19	Valve
Ret	20	(Italy) Nello Pagani	Maserati	15	Valve
Ret	4	(Allied-occupied Germany) Ludwig Fischer	Simca-Gordini	10	Engine
Ret	44	(Italy) Ferdinando Righetti	Ferrari	10	Cylinder head gasket
Ret	22	(Monaco) Louis Chiron	Simca-Gordini	9	Accident

Grand Prix Race
1949 Grand Prix season
Previous race: 1948 San Remo Grand Prix	San Remo Grand Prix	Next race: 1950 San Remo Grand Prix
