= 1947 San Remo Grand Prix =

Coordinates: 43°48′02,8″N 7°43′22.1″E

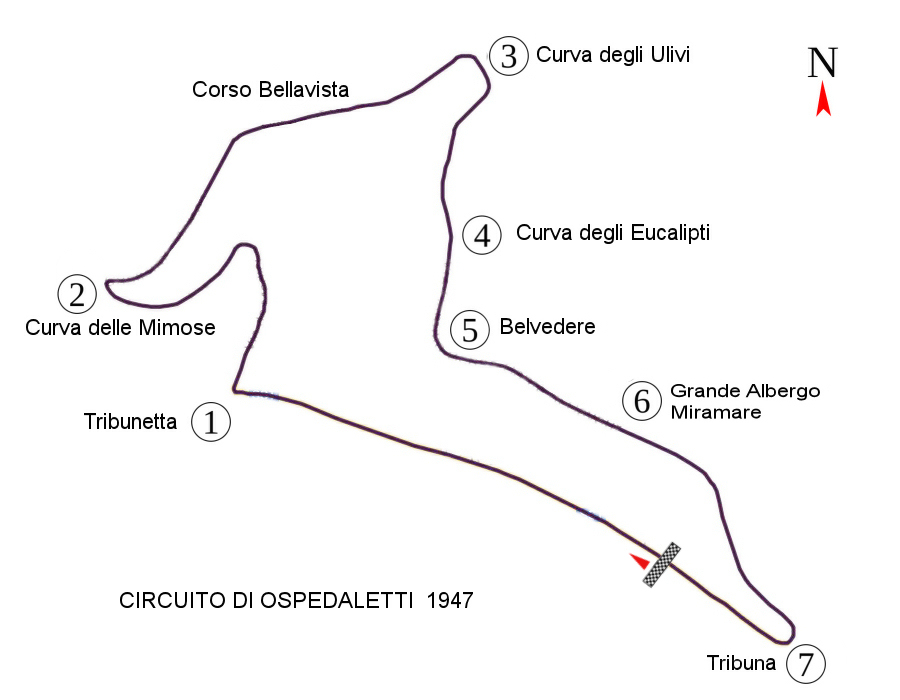
- Circuito di Ospedaletti 1947 (San Remo Grand Prix at Ospedaletti)

Race details
- Date: 13 April 1947
- Official name: II Gran Premio di San Remo
- Location: San Remo, Liguria, Italy
- Course: Ospedaletti
- Course length: 2.625 km (1.631 miles)
- Distance: 25 laps, 65.62 km (40.77 miles)

Pole position
Driver	(France) Yves Giraud-Cabantous	Delahaye 135 CS

Fastest lap
Driver	(France) Yves Giraud-Cabantous	Delahaye 135 CS
- Time: 2'2.76 min on lap 23 (73.370 km/h)

Podium
First	(France) Yves Giraud-Cabantous	Delahaye 135 CS
Second	(Italy) Renato Balestrero	Alfa Romeo
Third	(Italy) Pietro Ghersi	Alfa Romeo

The 2nd San Remo Grand Prix was held on April 13, 1947, for International Sports Cars at the 2.62 km Ospedaletti short circuit (clockwise). Racing was scheduled for 750cc (S750), 1100cc (S1.1) and 1100cc+ (S+1.1) class categories in three separate events.

== S 750 Classification ==
Pos	No	Driver	Manufacturer	Laps	Time/Retired	Grid
1	36	(Italy) Sesto Leonardi	Fiat 500	25	58'21,40	2
2	18	(Italy) Carlo Pesci	Fiat 500	25	59'11,60	1
3	16	(Italy) Piero Avalle	Fiat 500	25	59'51,40	3
4	6	(Italy) Armando Francois	Fiat 500	25	53'22.00	9
5	26	(Italy) Bartolomeo Franceri	Fiat 500	24	+ 1 lap	4
6	14	(Italy) Mario Avalle	Fiat 500	24	+ 1 lap	10
DNF	2	(Italy) Giovanni Dacco	Fiat 500	14	NC	5
DNF	10	(Italy) Enrico Galanti	Fiat 500	8	NC	7
DNF	26	(Italy) Bruno Martignomi	Fiat 500	4	NC	6
DNS	26	(Italy) Gianni Arezzi	Fiat 500		NC	

== S 1.1 Classification ==
Pos	No	Driver	Manufacturer	Laps	Time/Retired	Grid
1	10	(Italy) Piero Torelli	Fiat 1100 Volpini	25	53'34,40	6
2	26	(Italy) Carlo Nissotti	Fiat 1100	25	56'15,40	4
3	20	(Italy) Luigi Zanetti	Stanguellini 1100	25	53'56,60	5
DNF	2	(Italy) Alberto Comirato	Fiat 1100	14	NC	1
DNF	22	(Italy) Guido Scagliarini	Stanguellini 1100	13	NC	2
DNF	40	(Italy) Tazio Nuvolari	Fiat 1100 Speluzzi	10	NC	7
DNF	24	(Italy) Emilio Fioruzzi	Stanguellini 1100	9	NC	3
DNF	44	(Italy) Adolfo Bellini	Fiat 508	7	NC	8
DNF	42	(Italy) Nello Pagani	Fiat 1100 Speluzzi	1	NC	9
DNS	18	(Italy) Antonio Testi	Fiat 1100	1	NC	10
DNS	36	(Italy) Bruno Montagna	Fiat 1100	1	NC	11

== S+ 1.1 Classification ==
Pos	No	Driver	Manufacturer	Laps	Time/Retired	Grid
1	46	(France) Yves Giraud-Cabantous	Delahaye 135 CS	25	52'40,00	1
2	12	(Italy) Renato Balestrero	Alfa Romeo 8C Monza	25	54'19,00	2
3	16	(Italy) Pietro Ghersi	Alfa Romeo 8C 2900	25	54'28,00	8
4	24	(Italy) Nino Rovelli	BMW 328	24	53'22.00	6
5	14	(Italy) G. B. Azzi	Lancia Aprilia	23	53'06.40	5
DNF	28	(Italy) Mario Angiolini	Maserati A6	15	NC	3
DNF	2	(Italy) Giovanni Cattina	Alfa Romeo 2500	5	NC	7
DNF	10	(Italy) Adolfo Aloisio	Alfa Romeo 2500	2	NC	5
DNF	26	(United Kingdom) Oscar Moore	Frazer Nash BMW	1	NC	2

1937 San Remo Grand Prix	San Remo Grand Prix	1948 San Remo Grand Prix
