= 1948 Comminges Grand Prix =

Formula One race

Race details
- Date: 8 August 1948
- Official name: XIV Grand Prix du Comminges
- Location: Saint-Gaudens, Haute-Garonne, France
- Course: Temporary Street Circuit
- Course length: 11.005 km (6.838 mi)
- Distance: 30 laps, 330.15 km (205.15 mi)

Pole position
Driver	(Italy) Luigi Villoresi	Maserati
- Time: 4:02.3

Fastest lap
Driver	(Italy) Luigi Villoresi	Maserati
- Time: 4:12.8

Podium
First	(Italy) Luigi Villoresi	Maserati
Second	(France) "Raph"	Talbot-Lago
Third	(Monaco) Louis Chiron	Talbot-Lago

The XIV Grand Prix du Comminges was a Formula One motor race held on 8 August 1948 in Saint-Gaudens, Haute-Garonne, France. Luigi Villoresi, driving a Maserati 4CLT/48, qualified on pole, set fastest lap and won the race by a margin of four and a half minutes. Talbot-Lago drivers "Raph" and Louis Chiron were second and third.

== Classification ==
=== Race ===
Pos	No	Driver	Entrant	Car	Time/Retired	Grid
1	6	(Italy) Luigi Villoresi	Scuderia Ambrosiana	Maserati 4CLT/48	2:11:45.5, 150.31 kph	1
2	44	(France) "Raph"	Ecurie Mundia Course	Talbot-Lago T26C	+4:30.7	2
3	2	(Monaco) Louis Chiron	Ecurie France	Talbot Lago Monoplace Centrale	+1 lap	11
4	46	(France) Louis Rosier	Ecurie Rosier	Talbot-Lago T26C	+1 lap	4
5	28	(France) Pierre Meyrat	Pierre Meyrat	Delahaye 135S	+2 laps	12
6	10	(Italy) Nello Pagani	Enrico Platé	Maserati 4CL	+3 laps	5
7	24	(France) André Simon	André Simon	Delahaye 135S	+6 laps	14
Ret	4	(France) Yves Giraud-Cabantous	Ecurie France	Talbot-Lago T26C	7 laps, fuel tank	3
Ret	52	(France) Pierre Veyron	Equipe Gordini	Simca Gordini Type 15	5 laps	15
Ret	34	(France) Roger Loyer	Ecurie Paris	Veritas RS-BMW	4 laps	13
Ret	32	(France) Charles Huc	Charles Huc	Talbot-Lago T150SS	3 laps, con rod	19
Ret	36	(France) Charles Pozzi	Charles Pozzi	Talbot-Lago T26SS	3 laps, gearbox	6
Ret	50	(France) Eugene Martin	Eugene Martin	BMW 328	2 laps, fuel pump	20
Ret	16	(France) Richard Ramseyer	Ecurie Geneve	Maserati 4CM	1 lap	18
Ret	12	(Switzerland) Emmanuel de Graffenried	Enrico Plate	Maserati 4CL	Out of fuel	8
Ret	14	(France) Eugene Chaboud	Eugene Chaboud	Veritas RS-BMW		10
Ret	20	(France) Robert Manzon	Equipe Gordini	Simca Gordini Type 15		7
Ret	22	(France) Guy Mairesse	Guy Mairesse	Delahaye 135S		9
Ret	30	(United Kingdom) Pat Garland	Pat Garland	Delage 3000	Engine	16
Ret	48	(France) Charles de Cortanze	Émile Darl'mat	Darl'mat-Peugeot		17

Previous race: 1948 Zandvoort Grand Prix	Formula One non-championship races 1948 season	Next race: 1948 Grand Prix de Suisse Orientale
Previous race: 1947 Comminges Grand Prix	Grand Prix du Comminges	Next race: 1949 Comminges Grand Prix
