= 1949 Goodwood Trophy =

Race details
- Date: 17 September 1949
- Official name: II Goodwood Trophy
- Location: Goodwood Circuit
- Course length: 3.830 km (2.380 mi)
- Distance: 10 laps, 38.30 km (23.80 mi)

Pole position
Driver	(United Kingdom) Stirling Moss	Cooper-JAP
- Grid positions set by ballot

Fastest lap
Driver	(United Kingdom) Reg Parnell	Maserati
- Time: 1:36.8

Podium
First	(United Kingdom) Reg Parnell	Maserati
Second	(United Kingdom) Peter Walker	ERA
Third	(United Kingdom) Bob Gerard	ERA

The 2nd Goodwood Trophy was a non-championship Formula One motor race held at Goodwood Circuit on 17 September 1949. The race was held over 10 laps and was won by Reg Parnell in a Maserati 4CLT/48. Parnell also set fastest lap. ERA drivers Peter Walker and Bob Gerard were second and third.

== Classification ==
=== Race ===
Pos	No	Driver	Manufacturer	Time/Retired
1	1	(United Kingdom) Reg Parnell	Maserati 4CLT/48	16:39.6, 139.09kph
2	16	(United Kingdom) Peter Walker	ERA E-Type	+6.0
3	31	(United Kingdom) Bob Gerard	ERA B-Type	+9.0
4	2	(United Kingdom) David Hampshire	Maserati 4CLT/48	+30.8s
5	28	(United Kingdom) Brian Shawe-Taylor	ERA B-Type	+32.4s
6	19	(United Kingdom) Cuth Harrison	ERA C-Type	+46.4s
7	7	(United Kingdom) Joe Fry	Maserati 4CL	+55.6s
8	32	(United Kingdom) Dick Habershon	Delage 15S8	+1 lap
9	9	(United Kingdom) Duncan Hamilton	Maserati 6CM	+1 lap
Ret.	27	(United Kingdom) Tony Rolt	Aitken-Alfa Romeo	+1 lap
Ret.	4	(United Kingdom) Stirling Moss	Cooper T9-JAP	2 laps, engine
DNS	5	(United Kingdom) Eric Brandon	Cooper T9-JAP	
DNS	18	(United Kingdom) Archie Butterworth	AJB-Steyr	
DNS	26	(United Kingdom) Roy Parnell	ERA B-Type	
DNA	3	(United Kingdom) David Murray	Maserati 4CL	
DNA	8	(United Kingdom) George Bainbridge	Maserati 4CL	
DNA	11	(United Kingdom) Colin Murray	Maserati 6CM	

Previous race: 1949 Lausanne Grand Prix	Formula One non-championship races 1949 season	Next race: 1949 Australian Grand Prix
Previous race: 1948 Goodwood Trophy	Goodwood Trophy	Next race: 1950 Goodwood Trophy
