= 1948 San Remo Grand Prix =

Coordinates: 43°48′02.8″N 7°43′22.1″E

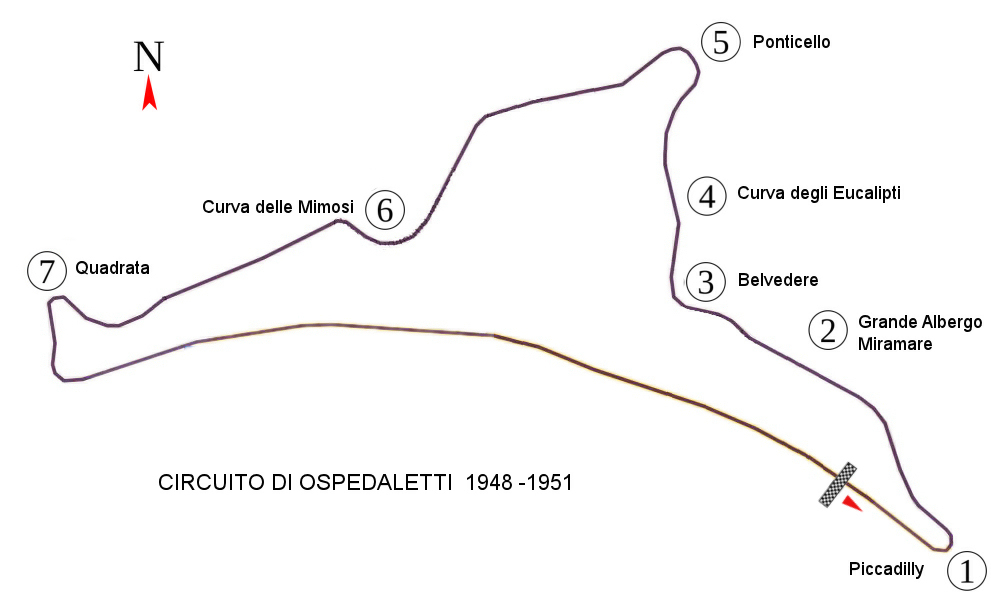
- Circuito di Ospedaletti 1948 (San Remo Grand Prix at Ospedaletti)

Race details
- Date: 27 June 1948
- Official name: III Gran Premio di San Remo
- Location: San Remo, Liguria, Italy
- Course: Ospedaletti
- Course length: 3.380 km (2.100 miles)
- Distance: 90 laps, 304.200 km (186.281 miles)

Pole position
| Driver | (Italy) Alberto Ascari | Maserati |
- Time: N/A

Fastest lap
| Driver | (Italy) Luigi Villoresi | Maserati |
- Time: 2:02.6

Podium
| First | (Italy) Alberto Ascari | Maserati |
| Second | (Italy) Luigi Villoresi | Maserati |
| Third | (Italy) Clemar Bucci | Maserati |

The 1948 San Remo Grand Prix was a non-Championship Voiturette motor race held on 27 June 1948 at the Autodromo di Ospedaletti, in Sanremo, Liguria, Italy. It was the 8th race of the 1948 Grand Prix season. The race, contested over 85 laps, was won by Alberto Ascari in a Maserati 4CLT/48, starting from pole position. Luigi Villoresi finished second also in a Maserati 4CLT/48 and Clemar Bucci third, driving a Maserati 4CL 1502.

== Classification ==
| Pos | No | Driver | Manufacturer | Laps | Time/Retired | Grid |
|---|---|---|---|---|---|---|
| 1 | 34 | (Italy) Alberto Ascari | Maserati | 85 | 2:57:08.2 | 1 |
| 2 | 18 | (Italy) Luigi Villoresi | Maserati | 84 | + 1 Lap | N/A |
| 3 | N/A | (Italy) Clemar Bucci | Maserati | 83 | + 2 Laps | N/A |
| 4 | 26 | (France) Raymond Sommer | Ferrari | 82 | + 3 Laps | N/A |
| 5 | N/A | (France) Louis Rosier | Talbot-Lago | 81 | + 4 Laps | N/A |
| 6 | 22 | (Monaco) Louis Chiron | Talbot-Lago | 80 | + 5 Laps | N/A |
| 7 | 28 | (Thailand) B. Bira | Maserati | 80 | + 5 Laps | N/A |
| 8 | N/A | (France) Yves Giraud-Cabantous | Talbot-Lago | 79 | + 6 Laps | N/A |
| 9 | 40 | (France) Eugene Chaboud | Delahaye | 78 | + 7 Laps | N/A |
| 10 | N/A | (Switzerland) Rudi Fischer | Simca-Gordini | 78 | + 7 Laps | N/A |
| Ret | 30 | (Switzerland) Emmanuel de Graffenried | Maserati | 34 | NC | N/A |
| Ret | 6 | (Italy) Giuseppe Farina | Maserati | 27 | Mechanical | N/A |
| Ret | N/A | (Italy) Luigi Plate | Talbot-Lago | 14 | Accident | N/A |
| Ret | N/A | (Italy) Chico Landi | Maserati | 9 | Suspension | N/A |
| Ret | N/A | (Italy) Franco Comotti | Talbot-Lago | 8 | NC | N/A |
| Ret | N/A | (Italy) Luigi Fagioli | Talbot-Lago | 1 | Mechanical | N/A |

Grand Prix Race
1948 Grand Prix season
| Previous race: 1947 San Remo Grand Prix | San Remo Grand Prix | Next race: 1949 San Remo Grand Prix |
