= 1949 Marseille Grand Prix =

Race details
- Date: 22 May 1949
- Official name: Grand Prix de Marseille
- Location: Parc Borély, Marseille
- Course: Temporary Street Circuit
- Course length: 2.629 km (1.639 miles)
- Distance: 50 laps, 131.45 km (81.95 miles)

Fastest lap
Driver	(Argentina) Juan Manuel Fangio	Simca Gordini
- Time: n/a

Podium
First	(Argentina) Juan Manuel Fangio	Simca Gordini
Second	(France) Philippe Étancelin	Talbot-Lago
Third	(France) Maurice Trintignant	Simca Gordini

The Grand Prix de Marseille was a Formula One motor race held on 22 May 1949 at the Parc Borély in Marseille. The race was held over two heats of 15 laps, from which the top six drivers would qualify for the final; a repechage for those who failed to qualify, from which the first two would qualify for the final; and the final itself of 50 laps. The winner was Juan Manuel Fangio in a Simca Gordini Type 15. Philippe Étancelin was second in a Talbot-Lago T26C and Maurice Trintignant third in a Simca Gordini Type 15.

== Classification ==
=== Heats ===
Heat 1

Pos	No	Driver	Car
1	4	(France) Philippe Étancelin	Talbot-Lago T26C
2	32	(Argentina) Juan Manuel Fangio	Simca Gordini Type 15
3	12	(France) Raymond Sommer	Ferrari 166C
4	28	(France) Eugène Martin	Jicey-BMW 328
5	18	(Italy) Roberto Vallone	Ferrari 166SC
6	10	(France) Eugène Chaboud	Delahaye Speciale
7	24	(Italy) Tazio Nuvolari^{1} (Italy) Piero Carini	Maserati A6GCS
8	30	(Italy) René Bonnet	DB6-Citroen
9	54	(Italy) Henri Degioanni	Bugatti Type 57S
Ret	26	(Spain) Enrique Tintoré	Maserati A6GCS
Ret	36	(France) Robert Manzon	Simca Gordini Type 15

^{1}Nuvolari took ill and retired after the first lap.

Heat 2

Pos	No	Driver	Car
1	34	(Argentina) Benedicto Campos	Simca Gordini Type 15
2	38	(France) Maurice Trintignant	Simca Gordini Type 15
3	42	(Italy) Nando Righetti	Stanguellini - Fiat
4	14	(Italy) Felice Bonetto	Ferrari 166C
5	2	(Monaco) Louis Chiron	Talbot-Lago T26C
6	40	(Switzerland) Rudi Fischer	Simca Gordini Type 11
7	7	(France) Pierre Levegh	Talbot-Lago T26C
8	8	(France) Guy Mairesse	Talbot-Lago T26C
9	44	(France) Roger Loyer	Cisitalia D46-Fiat
10	22	(Italy) Emilio Romano	Maserati A6GCS
11	50	(France) François Landon	Cisitalia D46-Fiat
Ret	46	(United States) Harry Schell	Cisitalia D46-Fiat

=== Miscellaneous ===
The following drivers are mentioned in the entry list but either did not qualify for the heats, or did not attend.

Pos	No	Driver	Entrant	Car
DNQ	52	(France) Elie Bayol	E. Bayol	Bugatti Type 35A
DNQ	56	(Italy) Ange Moscatelli	A. Moscatelli	Simca Speciale
DNQ	58	(France) Adrien Caire	A. Caire	Darl'mat-Peugeot
DNQ	64	(France) Paul Vallée	Vallée	Bugatti Type 35
DNS	44	(France) "Robert"^{2}	Ecurie de Paris	Cisitalia D46-Fiat
DNA	16	(Italy) Bruno Sterzi	Gruppo Inter	Ferrari 166C
DNA	60	(France) François Antonelli	F. Antonelli	BMW
DNA	62	(France) Paul Fabre	P. Fabre	Bugatti Type 37

^{2}Car driven by Loyer

=== Repechage ===
Pos	No	Driver	Car
1	7	(France) Pierre Levegh	Talbot-Lago T26C
2	8	(France) Guy Mairesse	Talbot-Lago T26C
3	30	(Italy) René Bonnet	DB6-Citroen
4	44	(France) Roger Loyer	Cisitalia D46-Fiat
5	26	(Spain) Enrique Tintoré	Maserati A6GCS
6	54	(Italy) Henri Degioanni	Bugatti Type 57S
Ret	24	(Italy) Piero Carini	Maserati A6GCS

=== Final ===
Pos	No	Driver	Entrant	Car	Time/Retired
1	32	(Argentina) Juan Manuel Fangio	Automovil Club Argentino	Simca Gordini Type 15	1:18:33.0, 167.79kph
2	4	(France) Philippe Étancelin	P. Étancelin	Talbot-Lago T26C	+18.6s
3	38	(France) Maurice Trintignant	Equipe Gordini	Simca Gordini Type 15	+35.5s
4	14	(Italy) Felice Bonetto	Scuderia Ferrari	Ferrari 166C	+1:06.6
5	34	(Argentina) Benedicto Campos	Automovil Club Argentino	Simca Gordini Type 15	+1:27.8
6	2	(Monaco) Louis Chiron	Ecurie France	Talbot-Lago T26C	+1 lap
7	10	(France) Eugène Chaboud	Ecurie Lutetia	Delahaye Speciale	+3 laps
8	18	(Italy) Roberto Vallone	R. Vallone	Ferrari 166SC	+4 laps
Ret	12	(France) Raymond Sommer	Scuderia Ferrari	Ferrari 166C	38 laps, fatigue
Ret	8	(France) Pierre Levegh	P. Levegh	Talbot-Lago T26C	30 laps, brakes
Ret	6	(France) Guy Mairesse	Ecurie France	Talbot-Lago T26C	Accident
Ret	40	(Switzerland) Rudi Fischer	R. Fischer	Simca Gordini Type 11	Overheating
Ret	28	(France) Eugène Martin	E. Martin	Jicey-BMW 328	Engine
Ret	42	(Italy) Nando Righetti	F. Righetti	Stanguellini - Fiat	Accident

Previous race: 1949 Roussillon Grand Prix	Formula One non-championship races 1949 season	Next race: 1949 British Empire Trophy
Previous race: 1948 Marseille Grand Prix	Marseille Grand Prix	Next race: 1950 Marseille Grand Prix
