= 1951 San Remo Grand Prix =

Coordinates: 43°48′02.8″N 7°43′22.1″E

- Non-championship race in the 1951 Formula One season
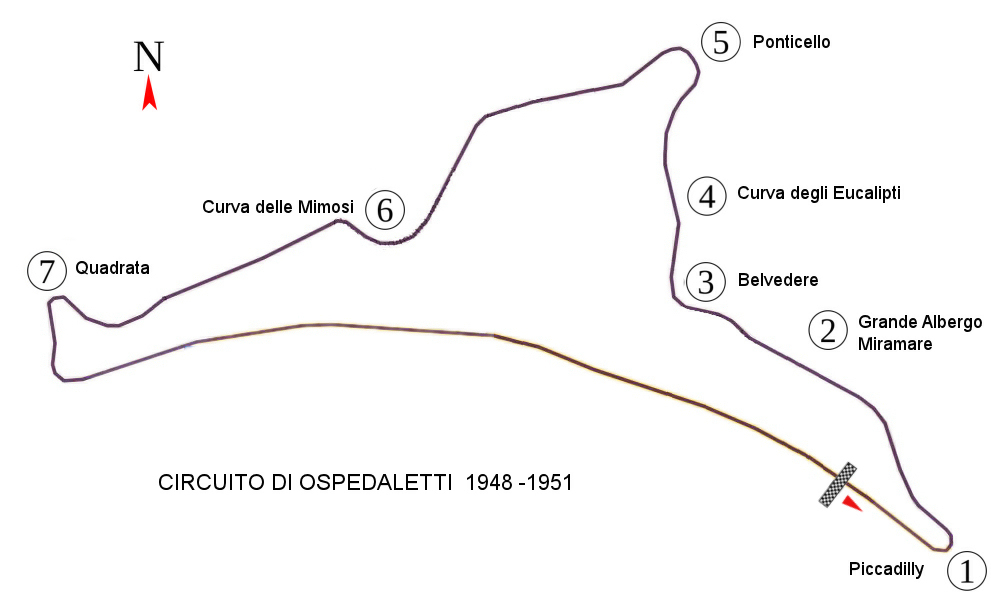
- Circuito di Ospedaletti 1948 (San Remo Grand Prix at Ospedaletti)

Race details
- Date: 22 April 1951
- Official name: VI Gran Premio di San Remo
- Location: San Remo, Liguria, Italy
- Course: Ospedaletti
- Course length: 3.380 km (2.100 miles)
- Distance: 90 laps, 304.200 km (186.281 miles)

Pole position
Driver	(Italy) Alberto Ascari	Ferrari
- Time: 1:52.0

Fastest lap
Driver	(Italy) Alberto Ascari	Ferrari
- Time: 1:53.8

Podium
First	(Italy) Alberto Ascari	Ferrari
Second	(Italy) Dorino Serafini	Ferrari
Third	(Switzerland) Rudi Fischer	Ferrari

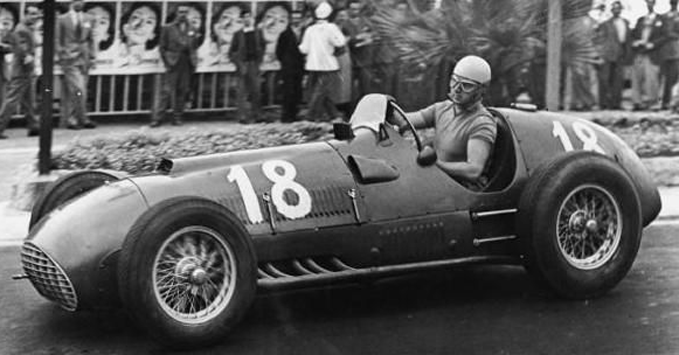
Alberto Ascari in his Ferrari 375 F1

The 1951 San Remo Grand Prix was a non-Championship Formula One motor race held on 22 April 1951 at the Autodromo di Ospedaletti, in San Remo, Liguria, Italy. It was the fourth race of the 1951 Formula One season. The 90-lap race was won by Ferrari driver Alberto Ascari, starting from pole position. Dorino Serafini finished second in a Ferrari and Rudi Fischer third, also in a Ferrari. All cars were 1.5-litre s/c F1 or 4.5-litre F1† unless noted (F2). During practice, Claes crashed his Talbot after a brake pipe broke, injuring four and killing one spectator, Antonino Cavestri.

== Classification ==
Pos	No	Driver	Manufacturer	Laps	Time/Retired	Grid
1	18	(Italy) Alberto Ascari	Ferrari	90	2:57:08.2	1
2	30	(Italy) Dorino Serafini	Ferrari	90	2:58:33.0	4
3	40	(Switzerland) Rudi Fischer	Ferrari	90	2:59:11.0	7
4	8	(United States) Harry Schell	Maserati	87	+ 3 Laps	8
5	16	(United Kingdom) Stirling Moss	HWM-Alta 51 (F2)	85	+ 5 Laps	10
6	14	(France) Guy Mairesse	Talbot-Lago	84	+ 6 Laps	17
7	24	(United Kingdom) Lance Macklin	HWM-Alta 51 (F2)	81	+ 9 Laps	13
8	28	(France) Henri Louveau	Talbot-Lago	79	NC	15
9	10	(United Kingdom) David Murray	Maserati	59	NC	12
10	4	(United Kingdom) Peter Whitehead	Ferrari	56	NC	14
11	36	(Monaco) Louis Chiron	HWM-Alta (F2)	42	NC	16
Ret	22	(France) Yves Giraud-Cabantous	Talbot-Lago	71	Mechanical	9
Ret	26	(Italy) Luigi Villoresi	Ferrari	63	Accident	2
Ret	32	(Switzerland) Emmanuel de Graffenried	Maserati	60	Suspension	3
Ret	34	(United Kingdom) Reg Parnell	Maserati	16	Rear Axle	11
Ret	6	(France) Louis Rosier	Talbot-Lago	8	Piston	6
Ret	20	(Thailand) B. Bira	Maserati	5	Accident	5
DNS	2	(Italy) Toni Branca	Maserati			
DNS	12	(Belgium) Johnny Claes	Talbot-Lago		Practice Accident	
DNA	38	(Italy) Giuseppe Farina	Maserati		Did not appear	

Previous race: 1951 Richmond Trophy	Formula One non-championship races 1951 season	Next race: 1951 Bordeaux Grand Prix
Previous race: 1950 San Remo Grand Prix	San Remo Grand Prix	Next race: — (discontinued for Formula 1)
