= 1937 San Remo Grand Prix =

Coordinates: 43°48′51.5520″N 7°46′21.5328″E

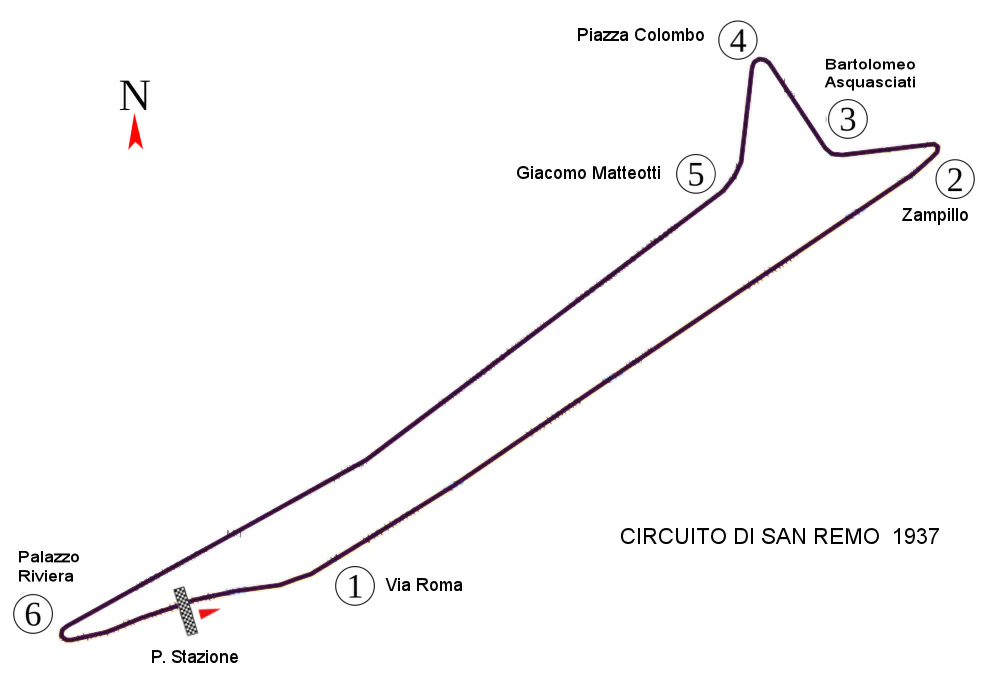

Race details
- Date: 25 July 1937
- Official name: I Gran Premio di San Remo
- Location: San Remo, Liguria, Italy
- Course: San Remo
- Course length: 1.862 km (1.157 miles)
- Distance: 30 (25-Heat) laps, 55.86 km (34.71 miles)

Pole position
Driver	(Italy) Achille Varzi	Maserati
- Time: 1:07.7

Fastest lap
Driver	(Italy) Achille Varzi	Maserati
- Time: 1:07.0 on lap 4

Podium
First	(Italy) Achille Varzi	Maserati
Second	(Italy) Piero Dusio	Maserati
Third	(Italy) Giovanni Rocco	Maserati

The first San Remo Grand Prix was a non-championship event, held on July 25, 1937, for 1500 cc Voiturette class Grand Prix cars and ran counter clockwise on a 1.862 km (1.157 m.) street circuit in the town of San Remo, known as the San Remo Circuit (Circuito di San Remo, official name: Circuita Stracittadino di San Remo)

The race was run in three 25 lap heats, the 2 best of each heat qualifying for the 30 lap (55.860 km.) final, which was won in 34'39" min. by Achille Varzi driving a Maserati 4CM, averaging 96.7 km/h.

== Heat 1 ==
Pos	No	Driver	Manufacturer	Laps	Time/Retired	Grid
1	2	(Italy) Piero Dusio	Maserati	25	30:29.4	1
2	10	(Italy) Emilio Villoresi	Maserati	25	+ 1'31.6	3
3	8	(Italy) Luigi Villa	Bugatti T51	20	+ 5 Laps	4
4	4	(Italy) Ettore Blanco	Maserati	18	+ 7 Laps	2

== Heat 2 ==
Pos	No	Driver	Manufacturer	Laps	Time/Retired	Grid
1	16	(Italy) Achille Varzi	Maserati	25	29:06.0	2
2	22	(Italy) Pasquino Ermini	Maserati	24	+ 1 Lap	4
3	20	(Italy) Nando Righetti	Maserati	24	+ 1 Lap	5
DNF	18	(Italy) Luigi Villoresi	Maserati	15	Crash Damage	1
DNF	14	(Italy) Aldo Marazza	Maserati	5	Ignition	3

== Heat 3 ==
Pos	No	Driver	Manufacturer	Laps	Time/Retired	Grid
1	32	(Italy) Giovanni Rocco	Maserati	25	29'36.0	4
2	26	(Italy) Giovanni Lurani	Maserati	25	+ 1'55.0	1
DNF	34	(Italy) Guido Barbieri	Maserati	21	+ 4 Laps (crash)	5
DNF	28	(Italy) Sergio Carnevalli	MB	21	+ 4 Lap (crash)	2
DNF	30	(Italy) Luigi Rovere	Maserati	21	+ 4 Laps (supercharger)	3

== Final Classification ==
Pos	No	Driver	Manufacturer	Laps	Time/Retired	Grid
1	16	(Italy) Achille Varzi	Maserati	30	34'39.3	1
2	2	(Italy) Piero Dusio	Maserati	30	+ 46.9	3
3	32	(Italy) Giovanni Rocco	Maserati	30	+ 51.7	2
4	22	(Italy) Pasquino Ermini	Maserati	29	+ 1 Lap	4
DNF	26	(Italy) Giovanni Lurani	Maserati	19	+ 11 Laps	5
DNF	10	(Italy) Emilio Villoresi	Maserati	28	+ 2 Laps	6

Grand Prix Race
Previous race: 1937 Milan Grand Prix	1937 Grand Prix season Grandes Épreuves	Next race: 1937 Villa Real Grand Prix
Previous race: NA	San Remo Grand Prix	Next race: 1947 San Remo Grand Prix
