= 1948 Goodwood Trophy =

Race details
- Date: 18 September 1948
- Official name: Goodwood Trophy Race
- Location: Goodwood Circuit, West Sussex
- Course: Permanent racing facility
- Course length: 3.830 km (2.380 mi)
- Distance: 5 laps, 19.15 km (11.90 mi)

Pole position
Driver	(United Kingdom) Archie Baring	Maserati
- Grid positions set by ballot

Fastest lap
Driver	(United Kingdom) Bob Gerard	ERA
- Time: 1:42.8

Podium
First	(United Kingdom) Reg Parnell	Maserati
Second	(United Kingdom) Bob Gerard	ERA
Third	(United Kingdom) David Hampshire	ERA

The Goodwood Trophy Race was a Formula One motor race held at the inaugural meeting at Goodwood Circuit, West Sussex on 18 September 1948. The race was held over five laps and was won by Reg Parnell in a Maserati 4CLT/48. ERA drivers Bob Gerard and David Hampshire were second and third, with Gerard setting fastest lap.

== Classification ==
=== Race ===
Pos	No	Driver	Manufacturer	Time/Retired	Grid^{1}
1	25	(United Kingdom) Reg Parnell	Maserati 4CLT/48	8:56.2, 80.56mph	5
2	16	(United Kingdom) Bob Gerard	ERA B-Type	+0.4s	6
3	24	(United Kingdom) David Hampshire	ERA A-Type	+5.8s	4
4	18	(United Kingdom) Cuth Harrison	ERA B-Type		2
5	29	(United Kingdom) Duncan Hamilton	Maserati 6CM		3
6	20	(United Kingdom) Geoff Ansell	ERA B-Type		7
7	26	(United Kingdom) Roy Salvadori	Maserati 4CM		8
8	28	(United Kingdom) Peter Walker	ERA B-Type		9
9	19	(United Kingdom) Archie Baring	Maserati 6CM		1

^{1}Grid places determined by ballot.

Previous race: 1948 Albi Grand Prix	Formula One non-championship races 1948 season	Next race: 1948 British Grand Prix
Previous race: —	Goodwood Trophy	Next race: 1949 Goodwood Trophy
