= Michelangelo Leonardi =

Michelangelo Leonardi is a former Italian racing driver. He entered one race in 1939 in an Alfa Romeo and eight races in the mid-1950s in a Lancia Aurelia and a Ferrari-Abarth 166 MM/53.

== Complete results ==
Year	Date	Race	Car	Teammate	Result
1939	June 11	Circuito dell'Impero	Alfa Romeo	none	5th
1952	May 4	Mille Miglia	Lancia Aurelia GT	"R.Tomatis"	43rd
1952	June 1	Coppa della Toscana	Lancia Aurelia GT	Carlo Gentili	41st
1952	July 13	Coppa d'Oro delle Dolomiti	Lancia Aurelia GT	-	24th
1953	April 12	Giro di Sicilia	Ferrari-Abarth 166 MM/53	"Regalini"	-
1953	April 26	Mille Miglia	Ferrari-Abarth 166 MM/53	Roberto Vallone	DNF
1953	May 19	Coppa Felice Bonetto	Ferrari-Abarth 166 MM/53	-	-
1955	July 24	10 Hours of Messina	Ferrari-Abarth 166 MM/53	-	-
