= 1950 San Remo Grand Prix =

- Non-championship race in the 1950 Formula One season
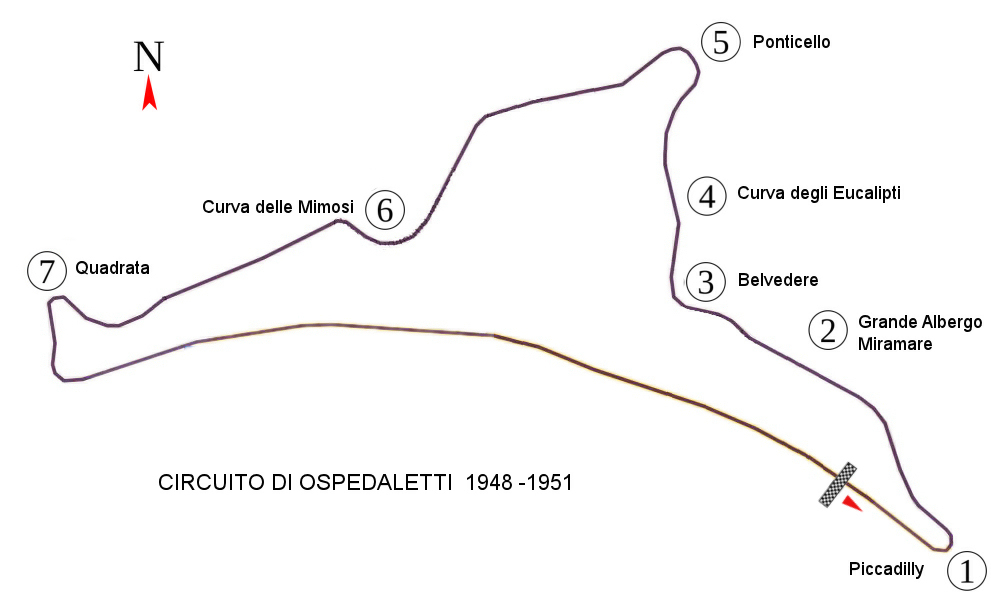

Race details
- Date: 16 April 1950
- Official name: V Gran Premio di San Remo
- Location: San Remo, Liguria, Italy
- Course: Ospedaletti
- Course length: 3.331 km (2.070 miles)
- Distance: 90 laps, 299.790 km (186.281 miles)

Pole position
Driver	(Italy) Alberto Ascari	Ferrari
- Time: 1:52.2

Fastest lap
Driver	(Italy) Luigi Villoresi	Ferrari
- Time: 2:01.2

Podium
First	(Argentina) Juan Manuel Fangio	Alfa Romeo
Second	(Italy) Luigi Villoresi	Ferrari
Third	(Argentina) Alfredo Pián	Maserati

The 1950 San Remo Grand Prix was a non-Championship Formula One motor race held on 16 April 1950 at the Autodromo di Ospedaletti, in Sanremo, Liguria, Italy. It was the third race of the 1950 Formula One season. The 90-lap race was won by Alfa Romeo driver Juan Manuel Fangio after starting from second position. Luigi Villoresi finished second in a Ferrari, and Alfredo Pián third in a Maserati.

== Classification ==
Pos	No	Driver	Manufacturer	Laps	Time/Retired	Grid
1	18	(Argentina) Juan Manuel Fangio	Alfa Romeo	90	3:10:08.3	2
2	24	(Italy) Luigi Villoresi	Ferrari	90	+ 1.1	3
3	6	(Argentina) Alfredo Pián	Maserati	88	+ 2 laps	7
4	2	(Italy) Roberto Vallone	Ferrari	86	+ 4 Laps	8
5	20	(Italy) Franco Rol	Maserati	84	+ 6 Laps	12
6	10	(Monaco) Louis Chiron	Maserati	84	+ 6 Laps	11
Ret	30	(Argentina) José Froilán González	Maserati	70	Fuel pipe	5
Ret	32	(Switzerland) Emmanuel de Graffenried	Maserati	51	Oil loss	18
Ret	28	(France) Raymond Sommer	Ferrari	39	Fuel pump	4
Ret	12	(Italy) Alberto Ascari	Ferrari	32	Crash	1
Ret	34	(Italy) Giovanni Bracco	Ferrari	28	Spin/Stall	9
Ret	40	(Italy) Piero Carini	Maserati	25	Spin/Stall	10
Ret	14	(Thailand) B. Bira	Maserati	11	Head gasket	15
Ret	44	(Italy) Felice Bonetto	Maserati	8	Brakes/Suspension	6
Ret	16	(Italy) Clemente Biondetti	Maserati	8	Gearbox	13
Ret	26	(United Kingdom) Leslie Brooke	Maserati	8	Mechanical	14
Ret	4	(United Kingdom) Peter Whitehead	Ferrari	8	Head gasket	16
Ret	36	(United Kingdom) Reg Parnell	Maserati	8	Engine	17
Ret	38	(Italy) Dorino Serafini	Ferrari	0	Oil pressure	19
Ret	8	(Switzerland) Rudi Fischer	SVA-Fiat	0	Oil pipe	20
DNA	22	(France) Eugène Chaboud	Talbot-Lago		Did not arrive	
DNA	42	(France) Pierre Levegh	Talbot-Lago		Did not arrive	
DNA		(United States) Harry Schell	Talbot-Lago			

Previous race: 1950 Richmond Trophy	Formula One non-championship races 1950 season	Next race: 1950 Paris Grand Prix
Previous race: 1949 San Remo Grand Prix	San Remo Grand Prix	Next race: 1951 San Remo Grand Prix
