= Carla Lavatelli =

Italian-American artist (1928–2006)

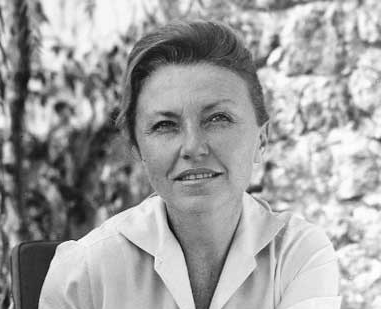
- Carla Lavatelli at Cidonio Foundation
- Born: August 21, 1928; Rome, Italy
- Died: January 18, 2006 (aged 77); Camaiore, Italy
- Known for: Sculpture, Stone Carving, Silk and Paper Installations, Jewelry

Carla Lavatelli (August 21, 1928 – January 18, 2006) was an Italian-American artist whose career spanned five decades, from the 1950s into the early 2000s. Her work is in the permanent collections of several major museums, including the San Francisco Museum of Art, the Phillips Collection in Washington, D.C., the Hakone Open-Air Museum in Japan, and the Cantor Arts Center at Stanford University. She was noted primarily for her abstract sculptures in stone and bronze, which appeared in reproduction in such publications as Arts Magazine, Art in America, and Artforum during the late 1960s and early 1970s.

== Biography ==
Carla Lavatelli was born in Rome, Italy, in 1928. She spent much of her childhood in different parts of Africa. She returned to Italy at the end of the World War II to study literature at Ca' Foscari University of Venice. In Venice she met and married an American man and moved to California. She subsequently divorced and returned to Italy, where she settled in Rome and began a practice of creating sculptural portraits. A self-taught artist, Lavatelli was commercially successful, securing several important commissions for notable sitters, including Grace Kelly, Princess of Monaco, and her three children in 1969. In 1981, she married former Italian Formula 1 racecar driver Roberto Vallone and relocated to Harris County in Texas. In the late 1960s and early 70s, Lavatelli participated in the “Officina Cidonio,” a non-profit organization in the Tuscan town of Pietrasanta for artists who sculpt in stone founded by Erminio Cidonio. Cidonio had previously invited prominent sculptors such as Henry Moore, Jacques Lipchitz and Jean Arp to have their work enlarged in the Henraux workshops in Querceta in the 1950s. In Pietrasanta, Lavatelli, the only female artist invited, worked alongside famed sculptor Isamu Noguchi and met with Moore, Lipschitz and Marino Marini. Upon Cidonio's death in 1971, Lavatelli purchased and restored a 16th-century olive mill in the nearby town of Camaiore, which became her home and studio for the next four decades.

== Exhibitions ==
During the 1960s and 1970s, Lavatelli worked primarily in the United States. In 1968–69, she exhibited her sculptural works, including her fountain “The Rainbow,” at the Palm Beach Galleries in Palm Beach, Florida. She also had a series of exhibitions of her work at the Selected Artists Gallery in New York in 1968 and 1970. In 1972 Alexander Iolas exhibited her entire studio in his gallery in Manhattan. In the mid-1970s, Lavatelli worked with the Gimpel & Weizenhoffer Gallery, where she showed her granite and marble pieces as well several floor sculptures. Between 1976 and 1996 she had a studio in SoHo at 140 Thompson Street. Many of the abstract works that Lavatelli produced with Cidonio at the Officina in Pietrasanta were exhibited in major museums in the early 1970s. In 1972, Lavatelli's sculptures were exhibited at the Hakone Open-Air Museum in Hakone, Japan, which subsequently acquired one of her works for its permanent collection. Two years later, six of Lavatelli's sculptures were exhibited at the Phillips Collection in Washington, D.C.

== Collections ==
Carla Lavatelli's sculptures are in many prominent museum and private collections across the United States and Europe, as well as in public and communal spaces and university campuses. Notable examples include her first abstract work, Ginko Biloba (1971), carved from red Persian travertine, which is located in the Phillips Collection in Washington, D.C. The work had been gifted to the Phillips by Lavatelli in 1974 on the occasion of her exhibition there the same year. Other important works include Stele For a Prayer (1971), a monolithic work in white Carrara marble and slate in the collection of the San Francisco Museum of Modern Art. Her carved stone and silver jewelry, which she called "Sculptures to Wear" are in the collection of the Minneapolis Institute of Arts. Several versions of Lavatelli's large-scale abstract sculpture in bronze and stainless steel, 1 ½ (1969–70), are in the museum collections of institutions such as Stanford University in Palo Alto, California, and Brown University in Providence, Rhode Island. Originally installed on the Stanford campus in front of the law school, 1 ½ was restored in 1996 by Lavatelli and relocated in the Fairchild Chapel. At Brown, 1 ½ has been on view in front of the brutalist high-rise Science Library building since its installation in 1985. Bill Van Siclen, an art critic for the Providence Journal, remarked in a 2007 article that Lavatelli's 1 ½ resembled a “giant chrome-plated engine part,” and that “had she not become a sculptor, [she] clearly had a future as a sports car designer.” In 1978, Lavatelli was commissioned to permanently install a spherical bronze sculpture in a newly created pond at the Botanical Gardens in Freiburg, Germany, which she titled Golden Pond. During the 1990s, she worked on several temporary and permanent site-specific installations, including "happenings" involving paper and reed sculptures in Pistoia, Italy, and New York. In 1995, the town of Mougins, in France, commissioned her to create a stone bench installation with a fountain set into a rough-hewn travertine in Place du Banc des Amis off the Rue d'Eglisse. On the occasion of the unveiling of the sculpture, Lavatelli was presented with the town's honorary gold medal in 1995.

== Notable works ==
- "Portrait of Princess Grace of Monaco" (1969), Monaco, France
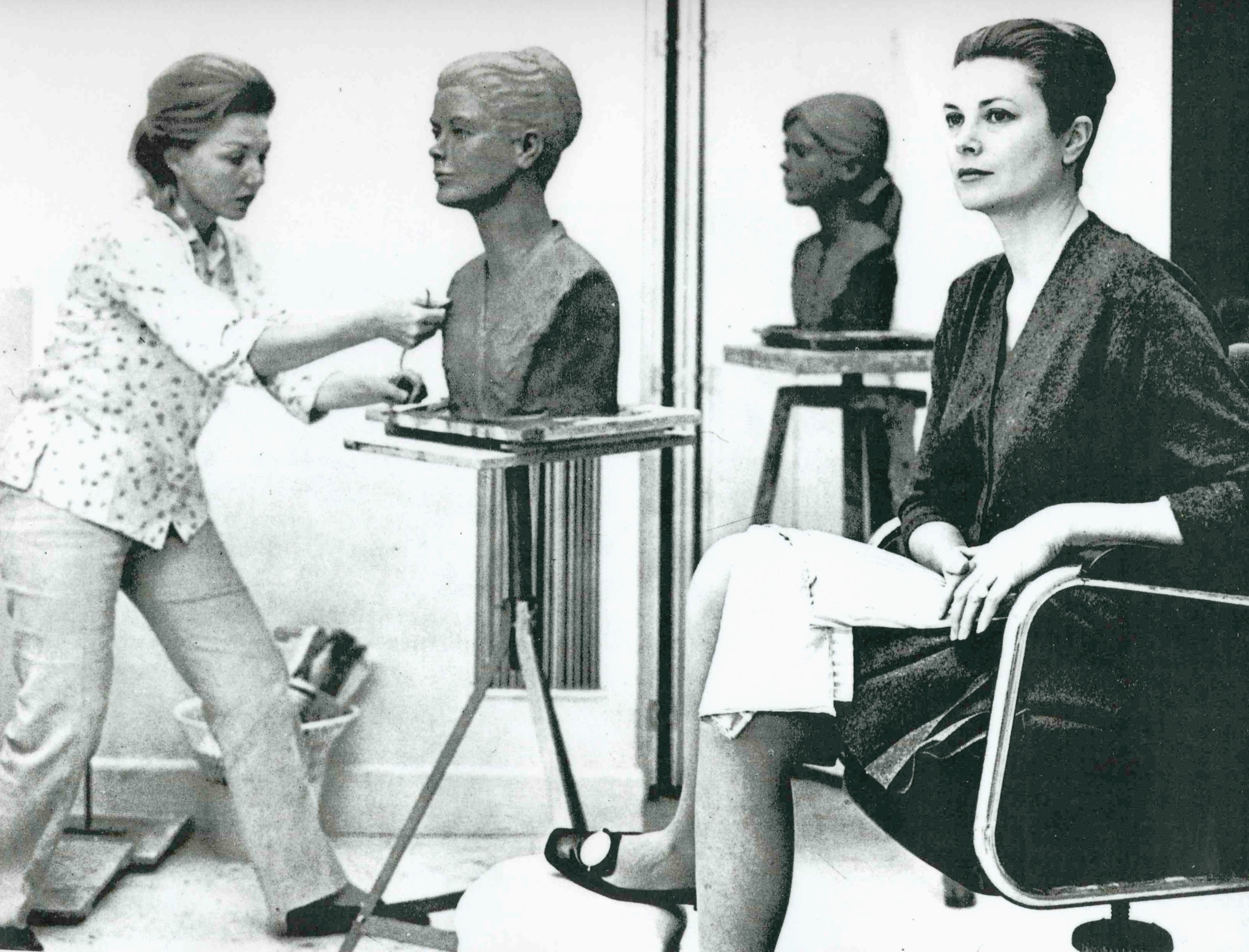
  Princess Grace posing for Carla Lavatelli - 1969
- "Sculptures to Wear" (1969), Minneapolis Institute of Art
- "Stele for a Prayer" (1971), San Francisco Museum of Modern Art, CA

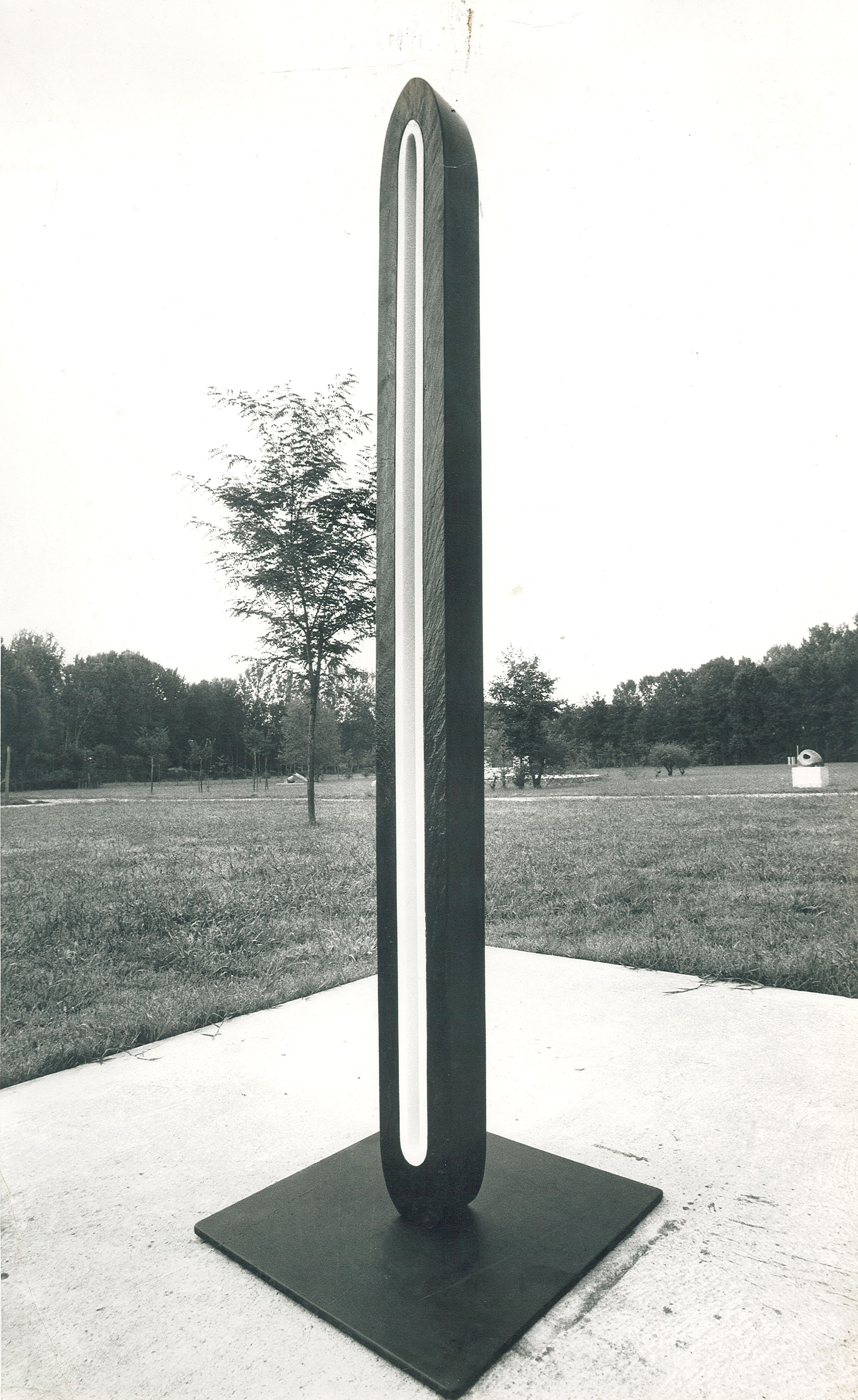
Stele for a Prayer - San Francisco Museum of Modern Art - 1971

- "Untitled", Hakone Open-Air Sculpture Garden (1972), Japan
- "Ginko Biloba" (1974), The Phillips Collection, Washington DC
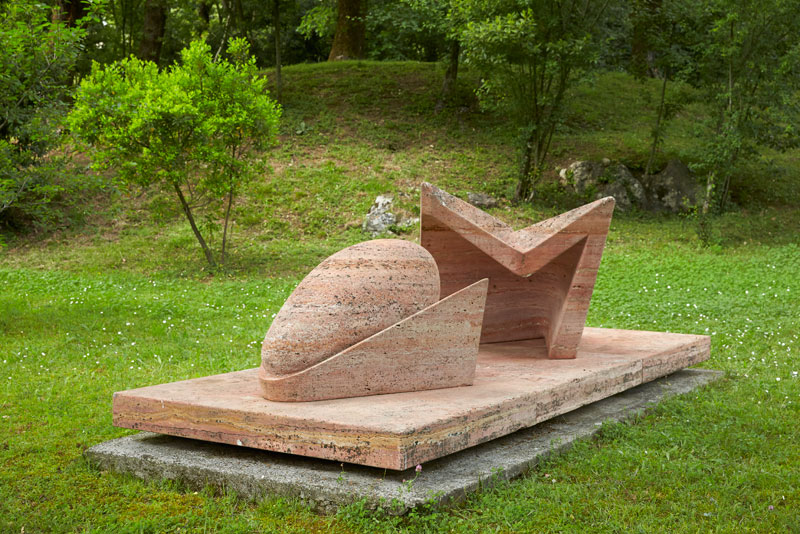
  Ginko Biloba - Philips Collection, Washington, D.C. - 1974
- "Golden Pond" (1973), Botanical Garden, Freiburg im Breisgau, Germany
- "1½"(1975), Stanford University, CA
- "Little Roof Big Sun" (1979–80), Private Collection
- "1½" (1985), Brown University, Providence RI
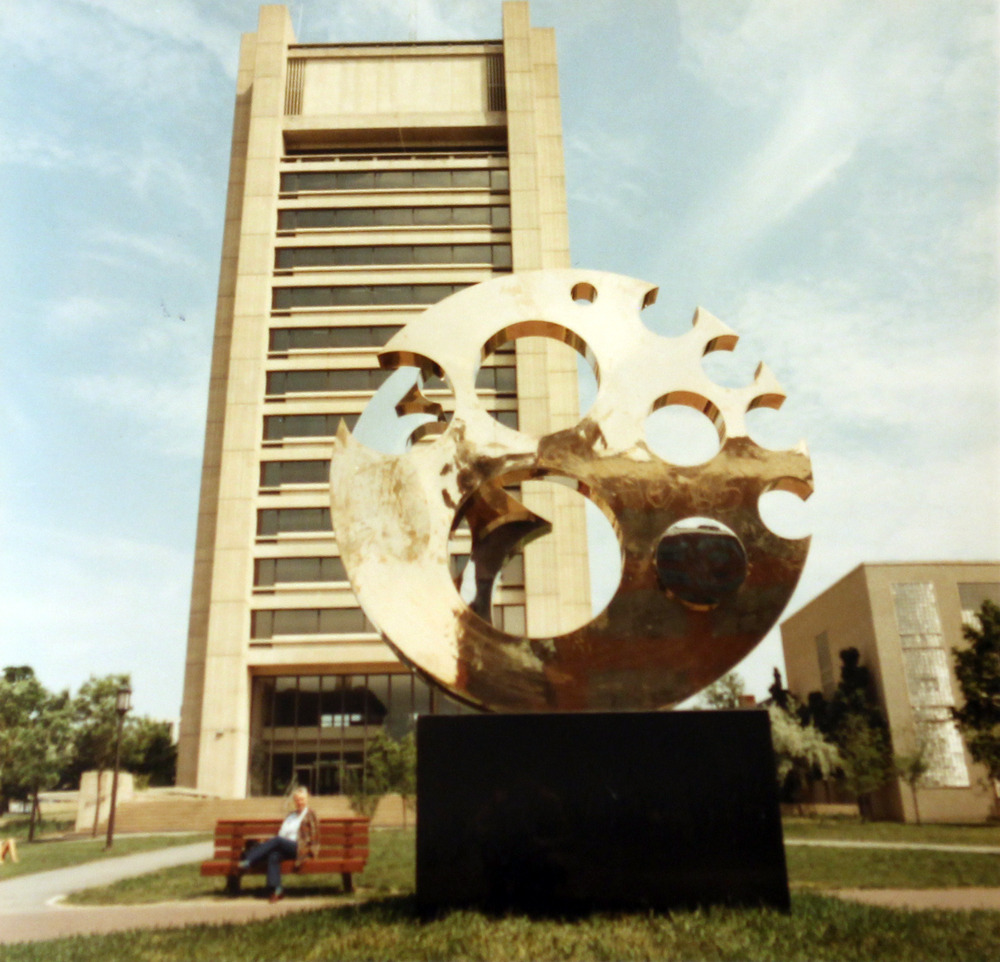
  '1 1/2' - Brown University - Providence, RI - 1985
- Paper Installation: "Happening for a Prayer" (1995), Pistoia, Italy
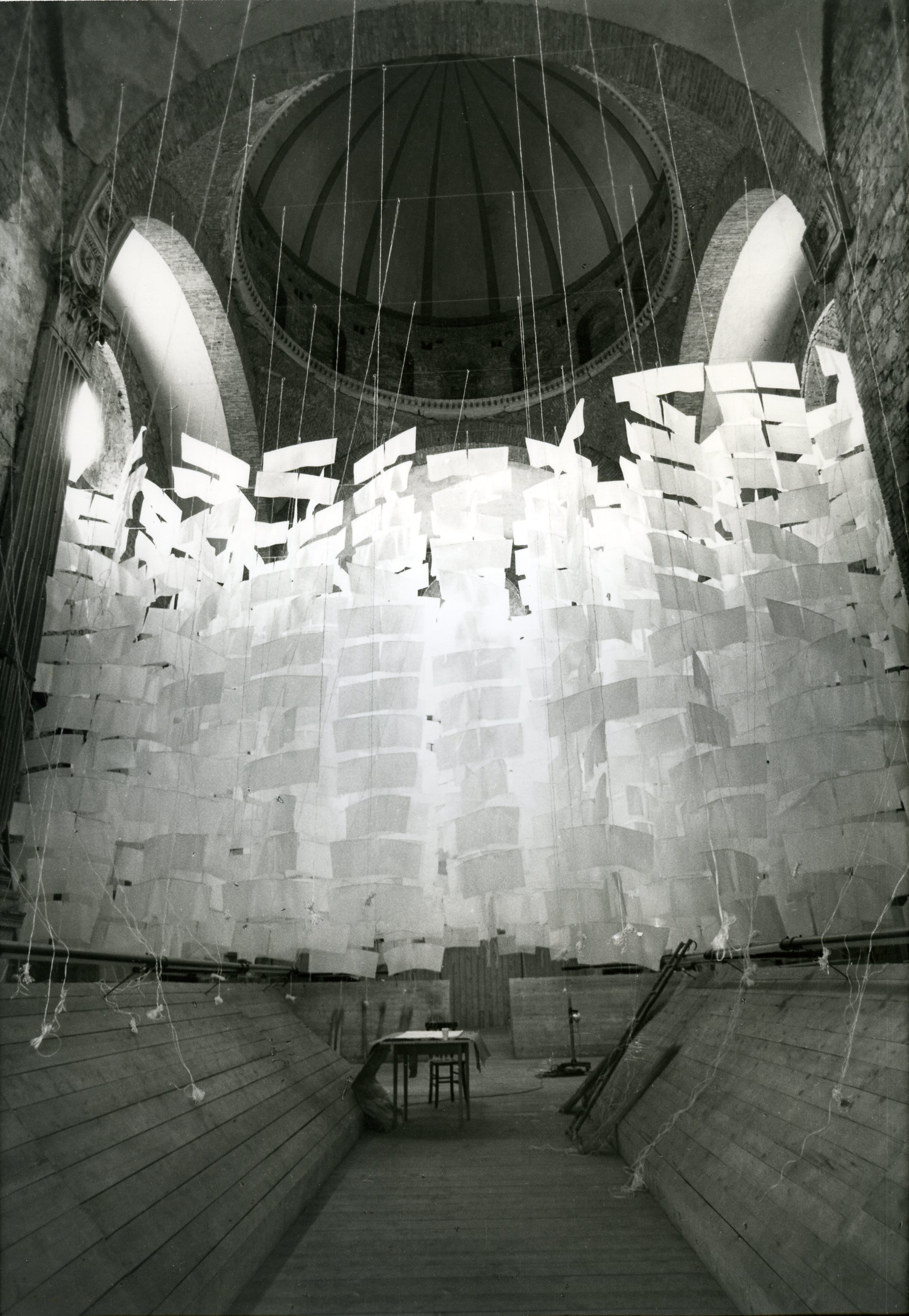
  'Happening for a Prayer' - San Giovanni Batista Church - Pistoia, Italy 1991
- "La Place du Banc des Amis" (1995), Mougins, France
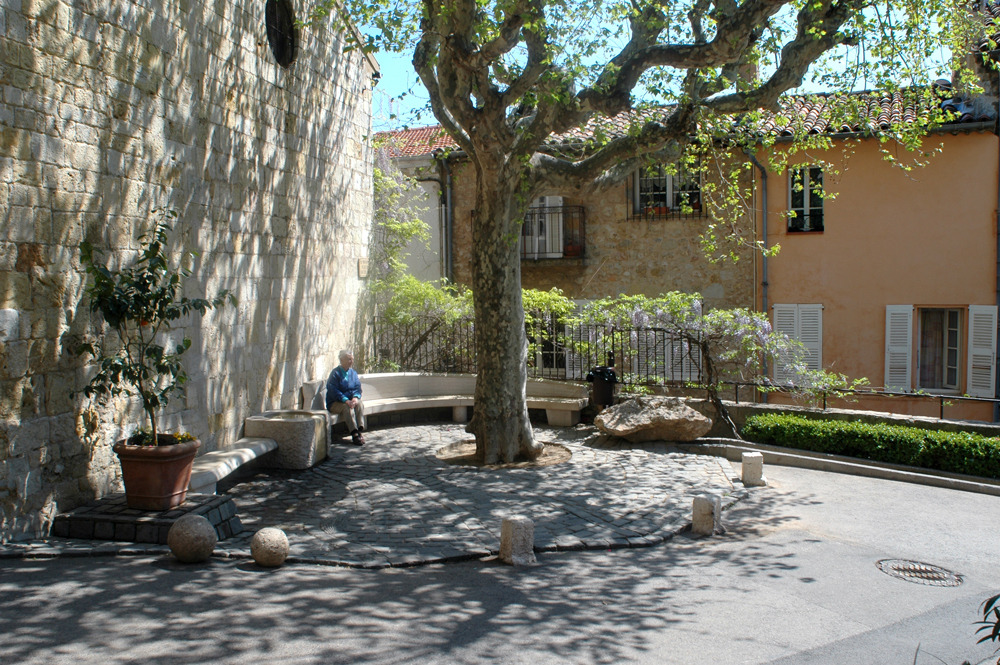
  Carla with her creation - Place du Banc des Amis - Mougins, France - 1995
- "The Wave" (2014), Collezione Gori, Fattoria di Celle, Pistoia, Italy
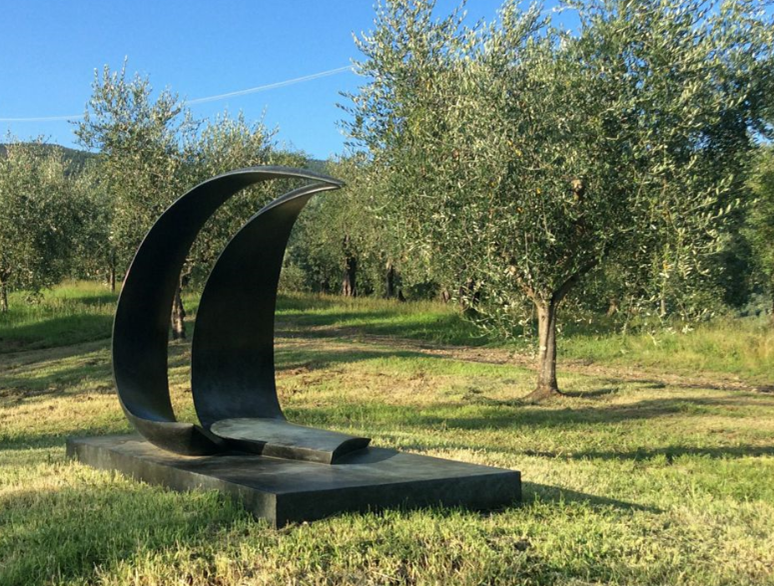
  The Wave - Gori Collection - Celle, Italy - 2014
- "Swirling Seagulls or Une Ronde de Mouettes" (2014) Mougins, France
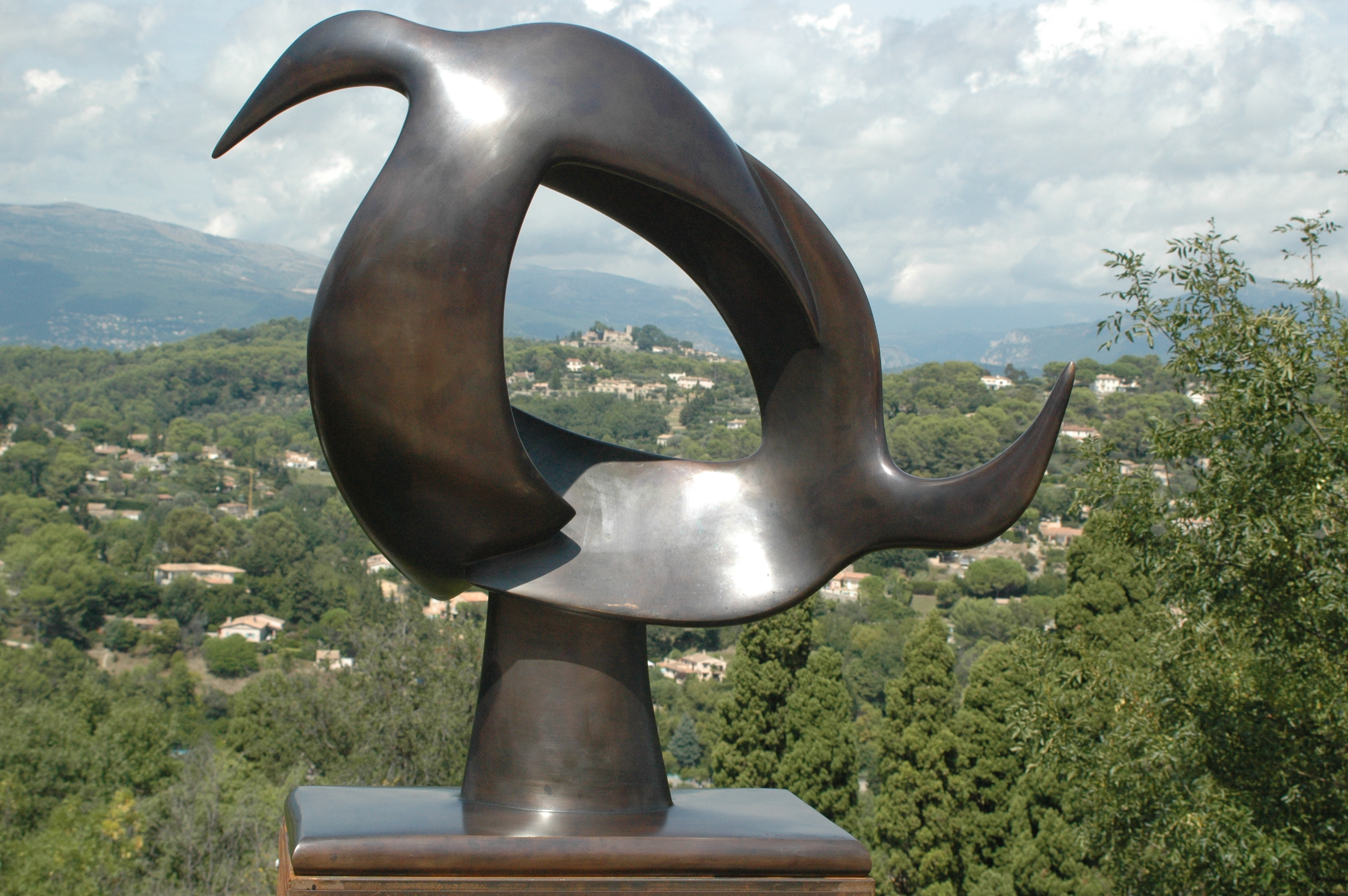
  Ronde de Mouettes in Mougins 2014 - flying over the plain of Grasse with Castellaras in the background

== Selected solo exhibitions ==
- 1959 – Galleria Russo, Rome
- 1960 – Sari Heller Gallery, Beverly Hills
- 1964 – Sari Heller Gallery, Beverly Hills
- 1965 – Palazzo Cerio, Capri, Italy
- 1966 – Galleria Il Carpine, Rome
- 1967 – Galleria degli Argenti, Milan
- 1967 – Galleria La Vernice, Bari, Italy
- 1969 – Palm Beach Galleries, Florida
- 1969 – Herbert Kende Gallery, New York,
- 1970 – Galerie Motte, Geneva, Switzerland
- 1970 – Benjamin Gallery, Chicago
- 1970 – Galerie Moos, Montreal
- 1970 – Palm Springs Art Museum
- 1971 – Sari Heller Gallery, Beverly Hills
- 1972 – Alexander Iolas, New York
- 1972 – Hakone Open Air Museum, Hakone, Japan
- 1974 – The Philips Collection, Washington, D.C.
- 1975 – Palm Beach Galleries, Florida
- 1976 – Gimpel & Weizenhoffer, New York
- 1995 – Centro per l'arte contemporanea Luigi Pecci and Fondazione Gori, Prato, Italy

== Honors and accomplishments ==
- 1972 – A documentary is filmed about Carla working at the 75th Street studio by Josh Gawronsky in New York
- 1980–82 Exhibits "The Life of a Boomerang" and "Stele for a Prayer" at the Einstein Institute of Advanced Studies in Princeton, New Jersey.
- 1985 – Lavatelli self-publishes “The Work of Carla Lavatelli by Carla Lavatelli... 1970-1984”.
- 1986 – Invited to create a paper happening, "Festa," at the Cathedral of St John the Divine, New York City, to celebrate Centennial of the cathedral with a Bach concert.
- 1989 – Lavatelli's home and studio in Camaiore, Italy, is featured in the Italian Architectural Digest series: “Sculptors in Their Studio.”
- 1993 – Inaugurates a photographic exhibit, "4 Photographes et Carla Lavatelli," at the Picasso Museum of Photography in Mougins, France.
- 1994 – Invited to exhibit her alabaster carving "The Light and the Limit" at the St. Augustine church and cloister in Pietrasanta, Italy
- 1995 – Hangs her weavings outdoors at the Musée Renoir in Cagnes sur Mer, France, between the olive trees. Ephemeral event is called "Parmis Les Oliviers."
- 1995 – Awarded the Gold medal honorary award of the City of Mougins, France.
- 1995 – Awarded commission for a photographic project commemorating the United Nations Project for Peace 50th Anniversary.
- 1998 – Creates cope, high altar cloth & processional banner using raw, handmade Indian silks for Easter celebration in San Francisco, CA.
