= San Remo Grand Prix =

Old car race

(Italy) San Remo Grand Prix
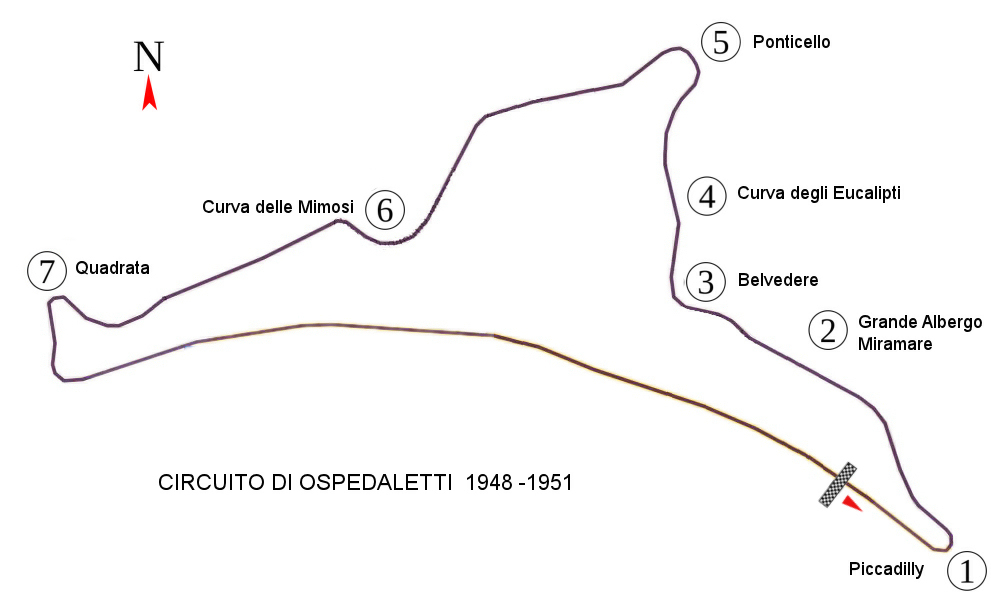
- Location: San Remo, Italy
- Coordinates: 43°48′51.5″N 7°46′21.5″E
- Major events: Grand Prix - Formula One

San Remo Street Circuit (1937)
- Surface: Asphalt
- Length: 1.862 km (1.157 mi)
- Turns: 6
- Race lap record: 1:07 (lap 4) ( (Italy) Achille Varzi, Maserati, 1937, Voiturette)

Circuito di Ospedaletti (1947 layout)
- Surface: Asphalt
- Length: 2.625 km (1.631 mi)
- Turns: 19
- Race lap record: 53.40 ( (France) Yves Giraud-Cabantous, Delahaye 135 CS, 1947, Sports Car)

Circuito di Ospedaletti (1948-1951 layout)
- Surface: Asphalt
- Length: 3.380 km (2.100 mi)
- Turns: 21
- Race lap record: 1:53.8 (1951) ( (Italy) Alberto Ascari, Ferrari, 1951, Formula One)

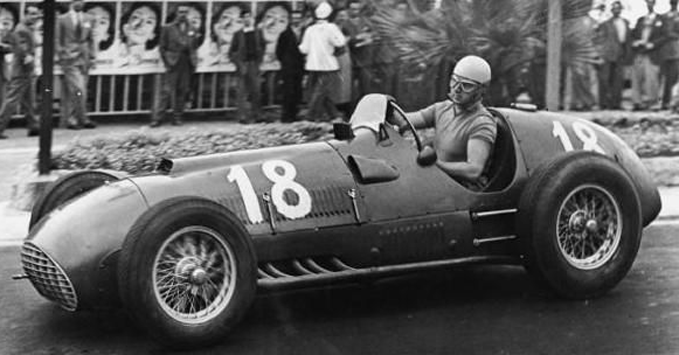
Alberto Ascari winning the 6th San Remo Grand Prix on 22 April 1951 in a Ferrari 375 F1

The Gran Premio Automobilistico di San Remo, commonly known as the San Remo Grand Prix, was a Grand Prix / Formula One and motorcycle race held in the north-western coastal town of San Remo (Italy) from 1937 to 1972. The first Grand Prix was held in 1937 on a street circuit in the town of San Remo, known as the San Remo Circuit (Circuito di San Remo, official name: Circuito Stracittadino di San Remo) and from 1947 to 1972 on the Ospedaletti street circuit.

== History ==
- 1937. The first (non-championship) San Remo GP was held for Voiturette class racing. Maserati was the dominant manufacturer with 4CM and 6CM entries.
- 1947. The 2nd edition of the San Remo Grand Prix was held for International Sport Cars. The event moved from San Remo to the Ospedaletti circuit.
- 1948. The Ospedaletti circuit was reconfigured from the 2.62 km (1.63 m) 1947 version to a longer 3.38 km (2.100 m) circuit. First appearance of Formula One cars.
- 1949–1951. Formula One continued to be the premier event until 1951.
- 1952–1972. Grand Prix motorcycle racing including Sidecar events were held on an annual basis.
- 1973–present. Historic and Club meets are held on a more infrequent schedule.

== Results by year ==
Year	Driver	Constructor	Formula	Type	Circuit	Time	Fast Lap	Report
1937	(Italy) Achille Varzi	Maserati	Voiturette	Maserati 6CM	San Remo	3:3.34.0 - 94.87 km/h	Varzi 1:07.0 - 100.05 km/h	Report
1947	(France) Yves Giraud-Cabantous	Delahaye	Int. Sports Car	Delahaye 135	Ospedaletti	0:53.40 - 73.37 km/h	Cabantous 2:2.75 - 77.0 km/h	Report
1948	(Italy) Alberto Ascari	Maserati	Voiturette (F1 Reg.)	Maserati 4CLT/48	Ospedaletti	3:3.34.0 - 94.87 km/h	L. Villoresi 2:02.6 - 99.37 km/h	Report
1949	(Argentina) Juan Manuel Fangio	Maserati	Voiturette (F1 Reg.)	Maserati 4CLT/48	Ospedaletti	3:1.28.6 - 99.26 km/h	B.Bira 1:56.0 - 104.89 km/h	Report
1950	(Argentina) Juan Manuel Fangio	Alfa Romeo	Formula One	Alfa Romeo 158sc	Ospedaletti	3:10.08.4 - 95.90 km/h	Villoresi 2:01.2 - 100.31 km/h	Report
1951	(Italy) Alberto Ascari	Ferrari	Formula One	Ferrari 375	Ospedaletti	2:57.08.2 - 101.70 km/h	Ascari 1:53.8 - 105.53 km/h	Report

== San Remo Grand Prix Circuit history ==
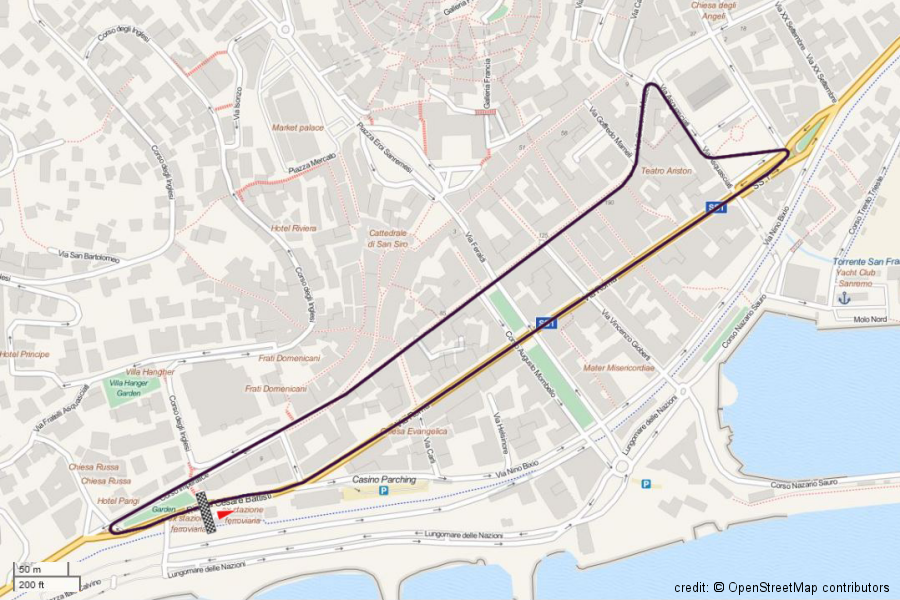
Street Map - San Remo Circuit 1937

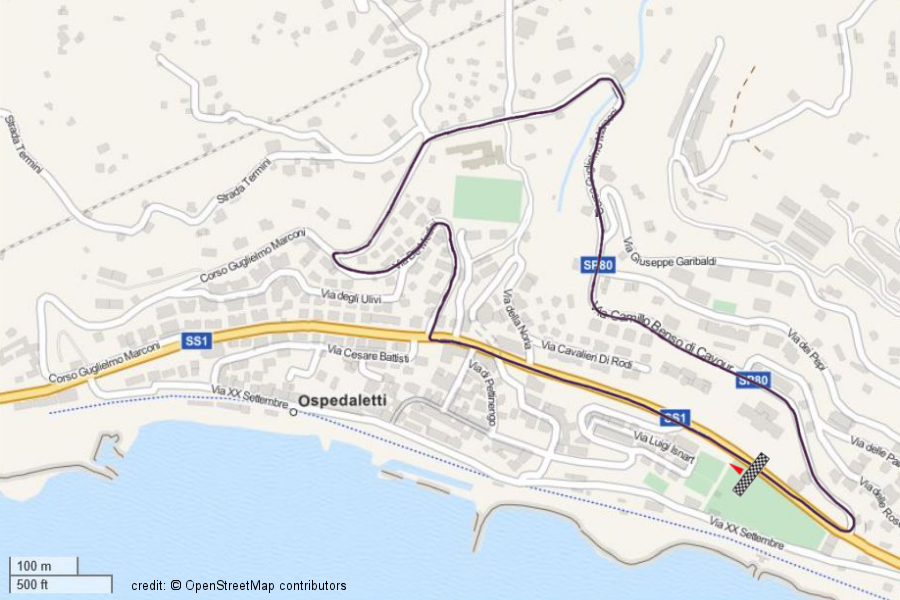
Street Map - Ospedaletti Circuit 1947

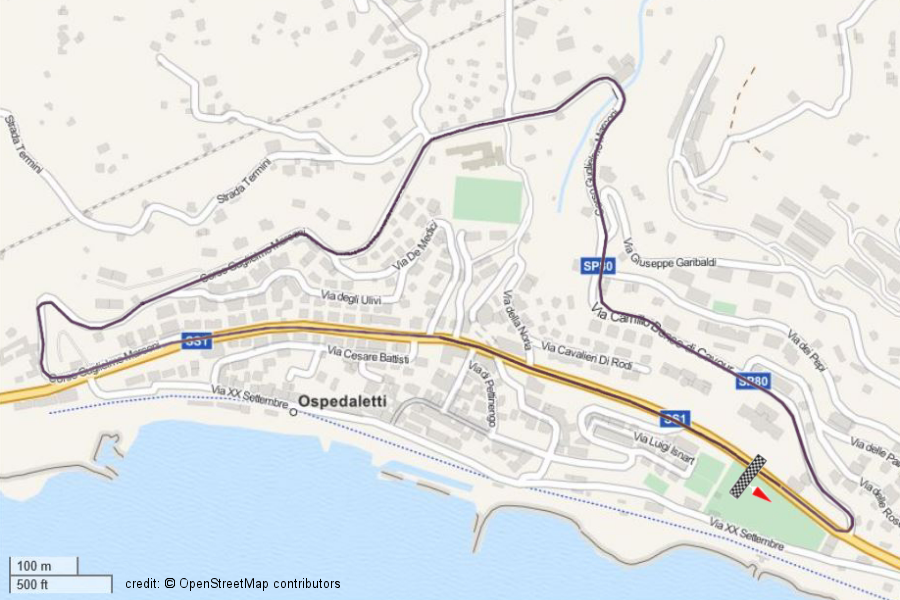
Street Map - Ospedaletti Circuit 1948-1951

== San Remo Grand Prix - Notable Drivers ==
- Louis Chiron (1948-1951), Louis Rosier (1948, 1949), Raymond Sommer (1948-1950), Emmanuel de Graffenried (1949-1951)
- Peter Whitehead (1949-1951), José Froilán González (1950), Reg Parnell (1950, 1951), Stirling Moss (1951)

The motorsport history of San Remo includes the Ralley San Remo dating back to 1929.
