= 1948 Zandvoort Grand Prix =

Race details
- Date: 7 August 1948
- Official name: I Grote Prijs van Zandvoort
- Location: Circuit Zandvoort, Zandvoort, Netherlands
- Course: Permanent racing facility
- Course length: 4.193 km (2.605 miles)
- Distance: 40 laps, 167.720 km (104.216 miles)
- Attendance: 100,000

Pole position
Driver	(United Kingdom) Reg Parnell	Maserati

Fastest lap
Driver	(Thailand) Prince Bira	Maserati
- Time: ? (Note: Motor Sport reports that Bira's fastest lap in the feature race was 77.86 mph (2:00.4 at 2.605 mi) but Motor Sport Database reports 2:02.1. In the 1948 article, the average race speeds for both heats and the final, and the fastest lap of Heat 1, are accurate, but the fastest laps of Heat 2 and the final are not. It also states that the race distance was 108 mi, at odds with other sources.)

Podium
First	(Thailand) Prince Bira	Maserati
Second	(United Kingdom) Tony Rolt	Alfa Romeo-Aitken
Third	(United Kingdom) Reg Parnell	Maserati

The 1948 Zandvoort Grand Prix was a non-championship Formula One race held on 7 August 1948 at Circuit Zandvoort.

== Report ==
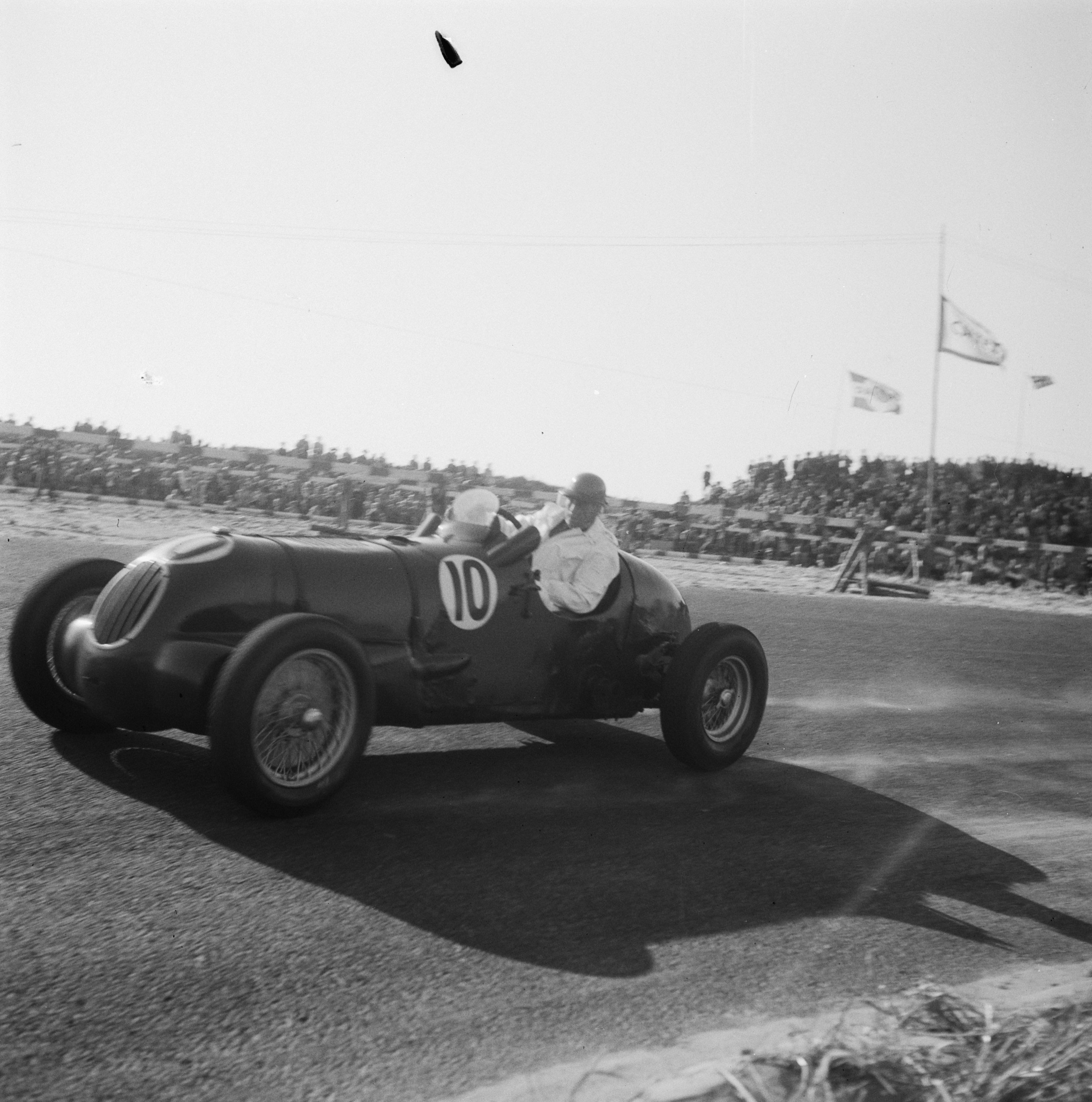
Tony Rolt in the 3.2-litre Aitken-Alfa, made by Peter Aitken (1912–47) based on an Alfa Romeo 8C bimotore

The event consisted of two 24-lap heats and a 40-lap final. The cars were split based on their racing numbers, the lower numbers competing in Heat 1 and the higher numbers in Heat 2. A qualifying session determined the grid for each heat. Bob Gerard did not start the event; it is unclear whether he competed in his heat.

Cuth Harrison secured pole position for Heat 1 at 2:03.8, but retired with a broken half-shaft and the heat went to Reg Parnell from Tony Rolt and John Bolster, Bolster setting the fastest lap at 1:57.9. George Abecassis retired with valve trouble.

Prince Bira secured pole position for Heat 2 at 2:00.2. He won with the fastest lap at 1:53.6, the fastest time of the weekend, with David Hampshire second and Duncan Hamilton third. Peter Walker retired with gearbox issues, while Leslie Johnson was a non-starter due to shock absorber trouble and getting sand in his supercharger.

In the final, Rolt led into the first corner but Bira assumed the lead by lap 3. Bira's engine was not 100% fit, preventing him from pushing hard. Rolt applied intense pressure, closing the gap consistently throughout the race but lacking the pace advantage to make an overtake. The two were separated by a single car length at the chequered flag, Bira's engine screaming as he did not want to risk losing ground with a gear change. Leslie Brooke ran third before stopping for oil and going on to finish 6th. Kenneth Hutchinson was 10th despite only having top gear for most of the race. Michael Chorlton, whose car struggled with carburation issues all day, reached the finish albeit nine laps down.

== Entries ==
No	Driver	Entrant	Constructor	Chassis
1	(United Kingdom) George Abecassis	George Abecassis	Alta	Alta GP
2	(United Kingdom) Geoff Ansell	Geoff Ansell	ERA	ERA R9B
3	(United Kingdom) Archie Baring (Note: A. A. Baring, b. 6 January 1912. Although his forenames are disputed, it is agreed that he was known as Archie. The name Anthony Baring is a common misquotation that appears in the sources cited by this article.)	Archie Baring	Maserati	Maserati 6CM
4	(United Kingdom) Kenneth Bear	Kenneth Bear	Bugatti	Bugatti 59
5	(United Kingdom) John Bolster	John Bolster	ERA	ERA R5B
6	(United Kingdom) Bob Gerard	Bob Gerard	ERA	ERA B
7	(United Kingdom) Cuth Harrison	Cuth Harrison	ERA	ERA B
8	(United Kingdom) Kenneth Hutchinson	Kenneth Hutchinson	Alfa Romeo	Alfa Romeo Tipo B
9	(United Kingdom) Reg Parnell	Scuderia Ambrosiana	Maserati	Maserati 4CL
10	(United Kingdom) Tony Rolt	Tony Rolt	Alfa Romeo-Aitken	Alfa Romeo 8C
11	(United Kingdom) Bob Ansell	Bob Ansell	Maserati	Maserati 4CL
12	(Thailand) Prince Bira	Princa Chula	Maserati	Maserati 4CL
14	(United Kingdom) Leslie Brooke	ERA Ltd	ERA	ERA R7B
15	(United Kingdom) David Hampshire	David Hampshire	ERA	ERA R1A
16	(United Kingdom) Leslie Johnson	ERA Ltd	ERA	ERA GP2 E-Type
17	(United Kingdom) Duncan Hamilton	Duncan Hamilton	Maserati	Maserati 6CM
18	(United Kingdom) Fred Ashmore	Reg Parnell Racing	ERA	ERA R2A
19	(United Kingdom) Roy Salvadori	Roy Salvadori	Maserati	Maserati 4CM (Note: Salvadori used his Maserati in his heat race although he also practiced his spare car, an Alfa Romeo Tipo B.)
20	(United Kingdom) Gordon Watson	Gordon Watson	Alta	Alta F2-2
21	(United Kingdom) Peter Walker	Peter Walker	ERA	ERA R10B
22	(United Kingdom) Michael Chorlton	Michael Chorlton	Bugatti	Bugatti 51A

== Classification ==
=== Heat 1 ===
Pos	No	Driver	Constructor	Laps	Time/retired
1	9	(United Kingdom) Reg Parnell	Maserati	24	50:17.8
2	10	(United Kingdom) Tony Rolt	Alfa Romeo-Aitken	24	+3.6
3	5	(United Kingdom) John Bolster	ERA	24	+5.4
4	8	(United Kingdom) Kenneth Hutchinson	Alfa Romeo	24	+43.0
5	2	(United Kingdom) Geoff Ansell	ERA	24	+2:00.4
6	3	(United Kingdom) Archie Baring	Maserati	?	
7	4	(United Kingdom) Kenneth Bear	Bugatti	?	
Ret	7	(United Kingdom) Cuth Harrison	ERA	?	Half-shaft
Ret	1	(United Kingdom) George Abecassis	Alta	?	Valves
DNS	6	(United Kingdom) Bob Gerard	ERA	?	

=== Heat 2 ===
Pos	No	Driver	Constructor	Laps	Time/retired
1	12	(Thailand) Prince Bira	Maserati	24	50:24.3
2	15	(United Kingdom) David Hampshire	ERA	24	+59.5
3	17	(United Kingdom) Duncan Hamilton	Maserati	24	+1:07.5
4	18	(United Kingdom) Fred Ashmore	ERA	24	+1:26.6
5	14	(United Kingdom) Leslie Brooke	ERA	24	+1:53.2
6	20	(United Kingdom) Gordon Watson	Alta	?	
7	22	(United Kingdom) Michael Chorlton	Bugatti	?	
8	19	(United Kingdom) Roy Salvadori (Note: Motor Sport states that Roy Salvadori qualified by finishing 8th in Heat 2. The rest of its Heat 2 finishing order is accurate. Other sources claim that he was eliminated in his heat.)	Maserati	?	
Ret	11	(United Kingdom) Bob Ansell	Maserati	?	Gearbox
Ret	21	(United Kingdom) Peter Walker	ERA	?	Gearbox
DNS	16	(United Kingdom) Leslie Johnson	ERA		Supercharger

=== Final ===
Pos	No	Driver	Constructor	Laps	Time/retired	Grid
1	12	(Thailand) Prince Bira	Maserati	40	1:25:22.2	4
2	10	(United Kingdom) Tony Rolt	Alfa Romeo-Aitken	40	+0.1	2
3	9	(United Kingdom) Reg Parnell	Maserati	39	+1 lap (Note: StatsF1, ChicaneF1, Silhouet and Motor Sport Database report that Parnell finished the race one lap down. Although Motor Sport states that he reached the flag 1.1 s after Rolt, he had probably just been lapped.)	1
4	17	(United Kingdom) Duncan Hamilton	Maserati	39	+1 lap	7
5	18	(United Kingdom) Fred Ashmore	ERA	39	+1 lap	8
6	14	(United Kingdom) Leslie Brooke	ERA	38	+2 laps	10
7	15	(United Kingdom) David Hampshire	ERA	38	+2 laps	6
8	2	(United Kingdom) Geoff Ansell	ERA	38	+2 laps	9
9	4	(United Kingdom) Kenneth Bear	Bugatti	37	+3 laps	12
10	8	(United Kingdom) Kenneth Hutchinson	Alfa Romeo	37	+3 laps	5
11	22	(United Kingdom) Michael Chorlton	Bugatti	31	+9 laps	14
12	3	(United Kingdom) Archie Baring	Maserati	28	+12 laps	11
Ret	20	(United Kingdom) Gordon Watson	Alta	?		13
Ret	5	(United Kingdom) John Bolster	ERA	?		3
DNS	19	(United Kingdom) Roy Salvadori	ERA			
DNQ	1	(United Kingdom) George Abecassis	Alta		Ret Heat 1	
DNQ	7	(United Kingdom) Cuth Harrison	ERA		Ret Heat 1	
DNQ	6	(United Kingdom) Bob Gerard	ERA		DNS Heat 1	
DNQ	11	(United Kingdom) Bob Ansell	Maserati		Ret Heat 2	
DNQ	21	(United Kingdom) Peter Walker	ERA		Ret Heat 2	
DNQ	16	(United Kingdom) Leslie Johnson	ERA		DNS Heat 2	

== Footnotes ==
Previous race: 1948 French Grand Prix	Formula One non-championship races 1948 season	Next race: 1948 Comminges Grand Prix
Previous race: None	Zandvoort Grand Prix	Next race: 1949 Zandvoort Grand Prix
