= Nino Rovelli =

Italian bobsledder (1917–1990)

Angelo Nino Vittorio Rovelli
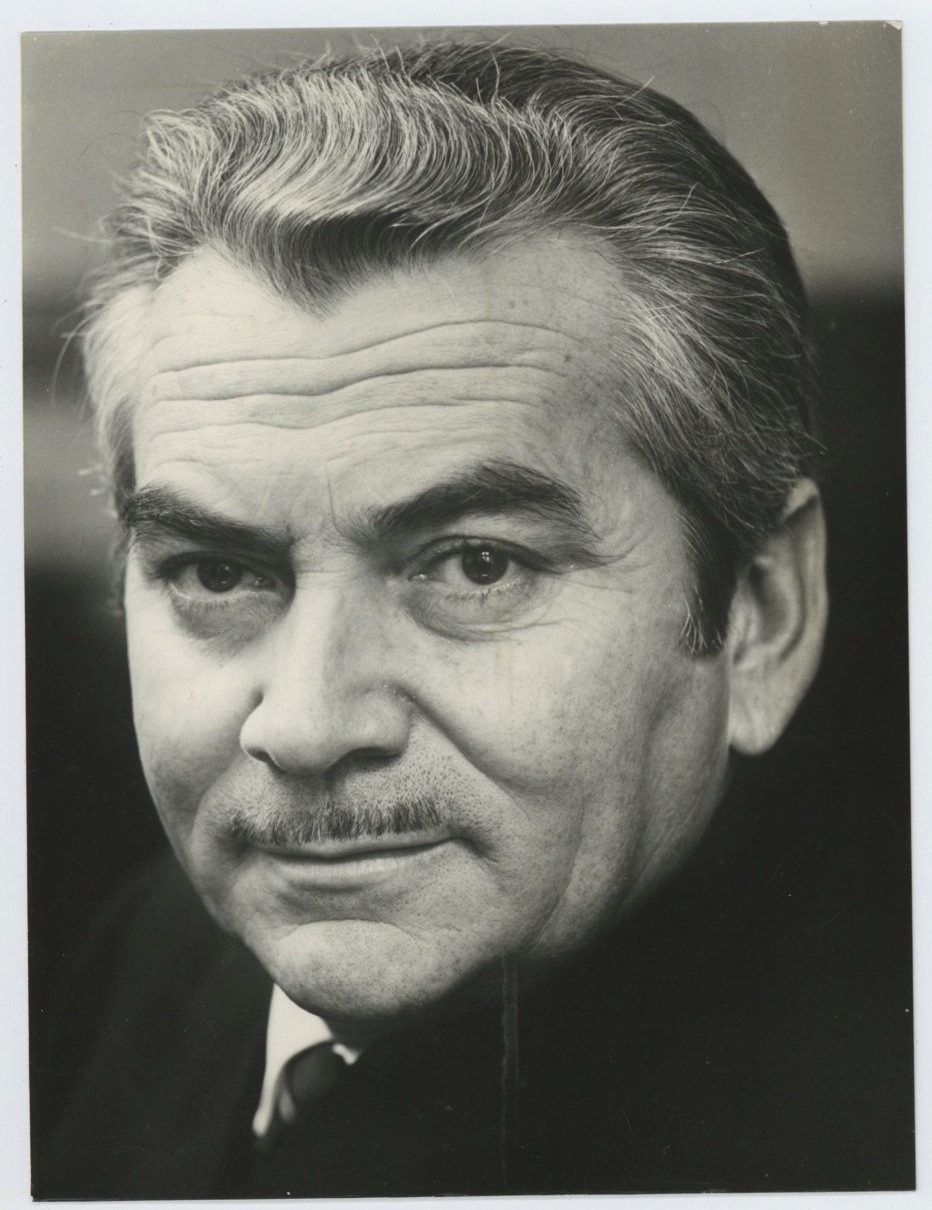
- Angelo Rovelli in the 60s
- Born: Olgiate Olona
- Died: December 30, 1990 (aged 73); Zürich
- Other names: Nino Rovelli
- Education: Industrial engineering degree at the Polytechnic University of Milan
- Occupation: President of the SIR-Società Italiana Resine
- Spouse: Primarosa Battistella

Angelo Nino Vittorio Rovelli, known simply as Nino Rovelli (Olgiate Olona, June 10, 1917 – Zürich, December 30, 1990) was an Italian bobsledder and entrepreneur who competed in the late 1940s. He finished 11th in the four-man event at the 1948 Winter Olympics in St. Moritz.

== Works ==
- Il romanzo degli stranieri, 1985 ISBN 9788817241700 Rizzoli (in Italian)
- Le stelle del Milan, 1986 ISBN 9788844301422 Siad Edizioni (in Italian)
- Azzurri 1910-1983, storia della nazionale di calcio tre volte campione del mondo, 1983 Rizzoli (in Italian; co-author Enzo Baroni)
- Il Romanzo Della Coppa Rimet 1930-1966, 1966 Bietti (in Italian)
