= Frank Séchehaye =

Swiss footballer (1907-1982)

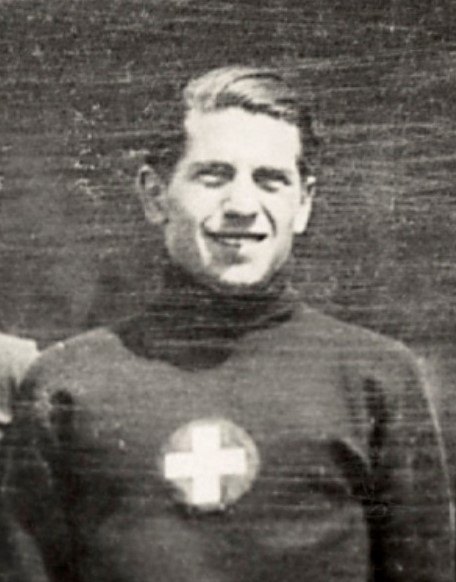
- Frank Séchehaye in 1928

Personal information
- Date of birth: 3 November 1907
- Place of birth: Geneva, Switzerland
- Date of death: 13 February 1982 (aged 74)
- Position: Goalkeeper

Youth career
- FC Thônex

Senior career*
Years	Team	Apps	(Gls)
1923–1929	Etoile-Carouge FC		
1929–1931	Club Français		
1931–1934	Servette FC		
1934–1936	FC Lausanne-Sport		

International career
1927–1935	Switzerland	37	(0)

Managerial career
- 1937–1938: Forward Morges
- 1942–1943: FC Lausanne-Sport
- 1958–1959: Servette FC
- 1959–1961: FC Sion
- 1961–1962: FC Lausanne-Sport
- * Club domestic league appearances and goals

Frank Séchehaye (French: [se.ʃə.ɛ]; 3 November 1907 – 13 February 1982) was a Swiss footballer (goalkeeper). He participated in the 1928 Summer Olympics and the 1934 FIFA World Cup. He played a total of 37 matches for Switzerland.

He played club football for Etoile-Carouge FC, Club Français, Servette FC and FC Lausanne-Sport. He coached Forward Morges, FC Lausanne-Sport, Servette FC and FC Sion.
