= Circuito di Ospedaletti =

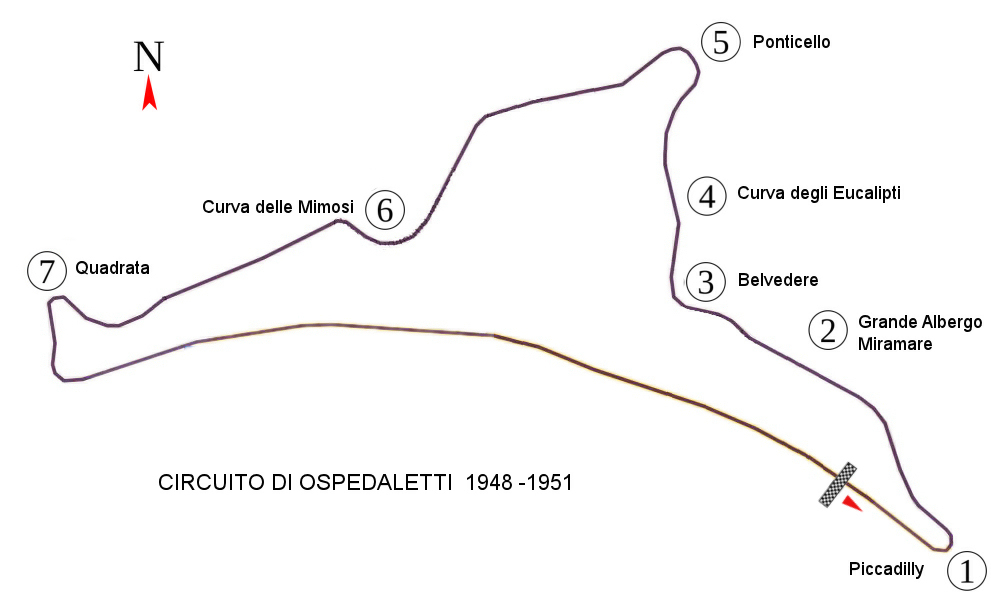
- Grand Prix Circuit (1948–1972)

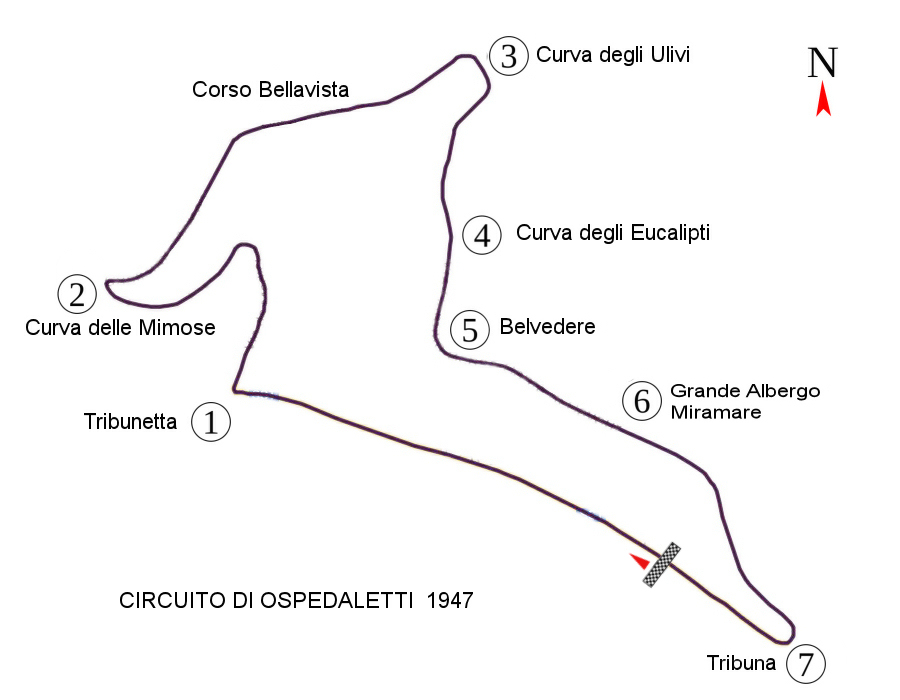
- Original Circuit (1947)
- Location: Ospedaletti, Italy
- Coordinates: 43°48′02.8″N 7°43′22.1″E
- Opened: 1947
- Closed: 1972
- Major events: San Remo Grand Prix (1947–1951)

Grand Prix Circuit (1948–1972)
- Surface: Asphalt
- Length: 3.380 km (2.100 mi)
- Turns: 7
- Race lap record: 1:53.8 ( (Italy) Alberto Ascari, Ferrari 375 F1, 1951, F1)

Original Circuit (1947)
- Surface: Asphalt
- Length: 2.625 km (1.631 mi)
- Turns: 7
- Race lap record: 2:02.76 ( (France) Yves Giraud-Cabantous, Delahaye 135 CS, 1947, Sportscars)

The Circuito di Ospedaletti commonly known as the Ospedaletti Circuit (official name: Autodromo di Ospedaletti) was a motor racing road course in the north-western coastal town of Ospedaletti (Liguria region of Italy), active from 1947 to 1972.

== Circuit history ==
The Autodromo di Ospedaletti was the second designated venue for the San Remo Grand Prix from 1947 to 1951, after the original San Remo street circuit of the 1937 Grand Prix was no longer able to support the changing requirements of post-war Grand Prix racing.

The circuit opened in 1947 as a 2.625 km (1.631 mi) street circuit for the II Gran Premio di San Remo. In 1948 the circuit was reconfigured to a distance of 3.380 km (2.100 mi) prior to the third San Remo Grand Prix.

== Race history ==
1947. The II Gran Premio di San Remo was held on April 13, for International Sports Cars. The race was run clock-wise over 25 laps on the 2.625 km (1.631 mi) short circuit and was won by Yves Giraud-Cabantous in a Delahaye 135. It was also the inaugural year of the "Gran Trofeo" for Motorcycles (official name: Gran Trofeo Motociclistico di San Remo) (1947 to 1972).

1948. The third San Remo Grand prix was held on June 27, on the reconfigured 3.380 km (2.100 mi) circuit for Voiturette class cars running to the new Formula One regulations. The competition was run counter clock-wise over 90 laps and was won from pole position by Alberto Ascari driving a Maserati 4CLT/48. Luigi Villoresi set the first lap record of 2'02.6 min (99.37 km/h) also in a Maserati 4CLT/48.

1949. The Maserati dominance at Ospedaletti continued for the 4CLT at the April 3, 1949 San Remo Grand Prix. The race was contested counter clock-wise over two 45 lap heats which were won by Juan Manuel Fangio to take the overall title by aggregate time of 3 h, 1'28.6 min (99.26 km/h) for both heats. B. Bira posted the fastest lap in 1'56.0 min, also driving a Maserati 4CLT/48.

1950. The 1950 San Remo Grand Prix, held on April 16, was a non-championship round of the inaugural F.I.A. Drivers World Championship season. The race was won again by Juan Manuel Fangio, this time in an Alfa Romeo 158 s/c, marking the end of the Maserati dominance.

1951. The 1951 San Remo Grand Prix was the last year for Formula One to race at Ospedaletti and the last edition of the San Remo Grand Prix. The non-championship event was won from pole position by Alberto Ascari in a Ferrari 375, setting the final lap record of 1'53.8, averaging 105.53 km/h.

== Results by year ==
Year	Driver	Manufacturer	Formula	Type	Circuit	Time	Fast Lap	Report
1947	(France) Yves Giraud-Cabantous	Delahaye	Int. Sports Car	Delahaye 135	Ospedaletti	0:53.40 - 73.370 km/h	Cabantous 2'2.75 - 77.0 km/h	Report
1948	(Italy) Alberto Ascari	Maserati	Voiturette (F1 Reg.)	Maserati 4CLT/48	Ospedaletti	3:3.34.0 - 94.87 km/h	Villoresi 2'02.6 - 99.37 km/h	Report
1949	(Argentina) Juan Manuel Fangio	Maserati	Voiturette (F1 Reg.)	Maserati 4CLT/48	Ospedaletti	3:1.28.6 - 99.26 km/h	B.Bira 1'56.0 - 104.89 km/h	Report
1950	(Argentina) Juan Manuel Fangio	Ferrari	Formula One	Alfa Romeo 158 s/c	Ospedaletti	3:10.08.4 - 95.90 km/h	Villoresi 2'01.2 - 100.31 km/h	Report
1951	(Italy) Alberto Ascari	Ferrari	Formula One	Ferrari 375	Ospedaletti	2:57.08.2 - 101.70 km/h	Ascari 1'53.8 - 105.53 km/h	Report
