= Formula One drivers from Spain =

Group of Formula One drivers who competed as Spanish

- Drivers: 15
- Grands Prix: 627
- Entries: 1002
- Starts: 961
- Best season finish: 1st (2005, 2006)
- Wins: 36
- Podiums: 137
- Pole positions: 28
- Fastest laps: 31
- Points: 3825.5
- First entry: 1951 Spanish Grand Prix
- First win: 2003 Hungarian Grand Prix
- Latest win: 2024 Mexico City Grand Prix
- Latest entry: 2026 Mexico City Grand Prix
- 2026 drivers: Fernando Alonso; Carlos Sainz Jr.

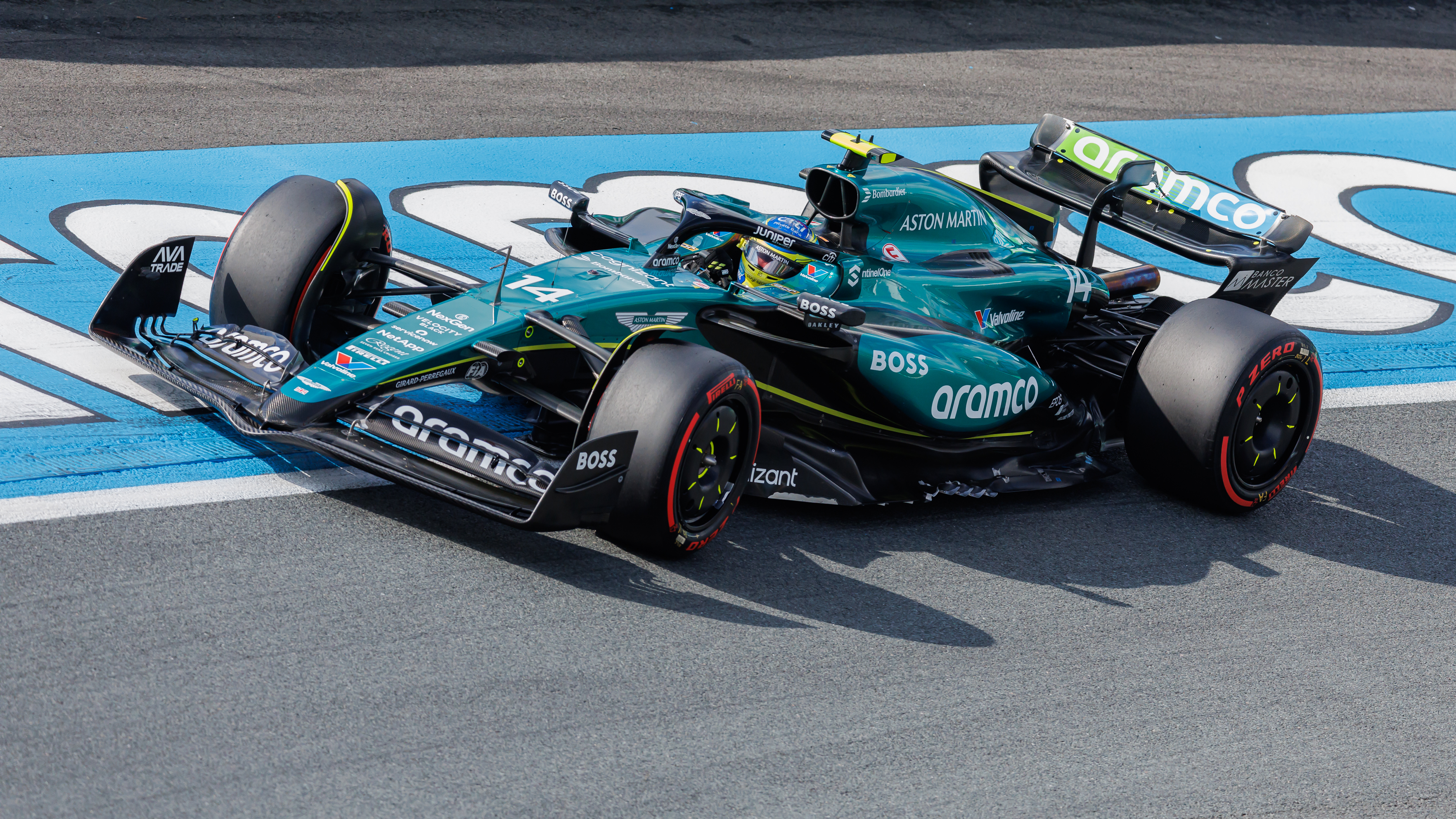
Fernando Alonso in a Aston Martin at the 2024 Dutch Grand Prix

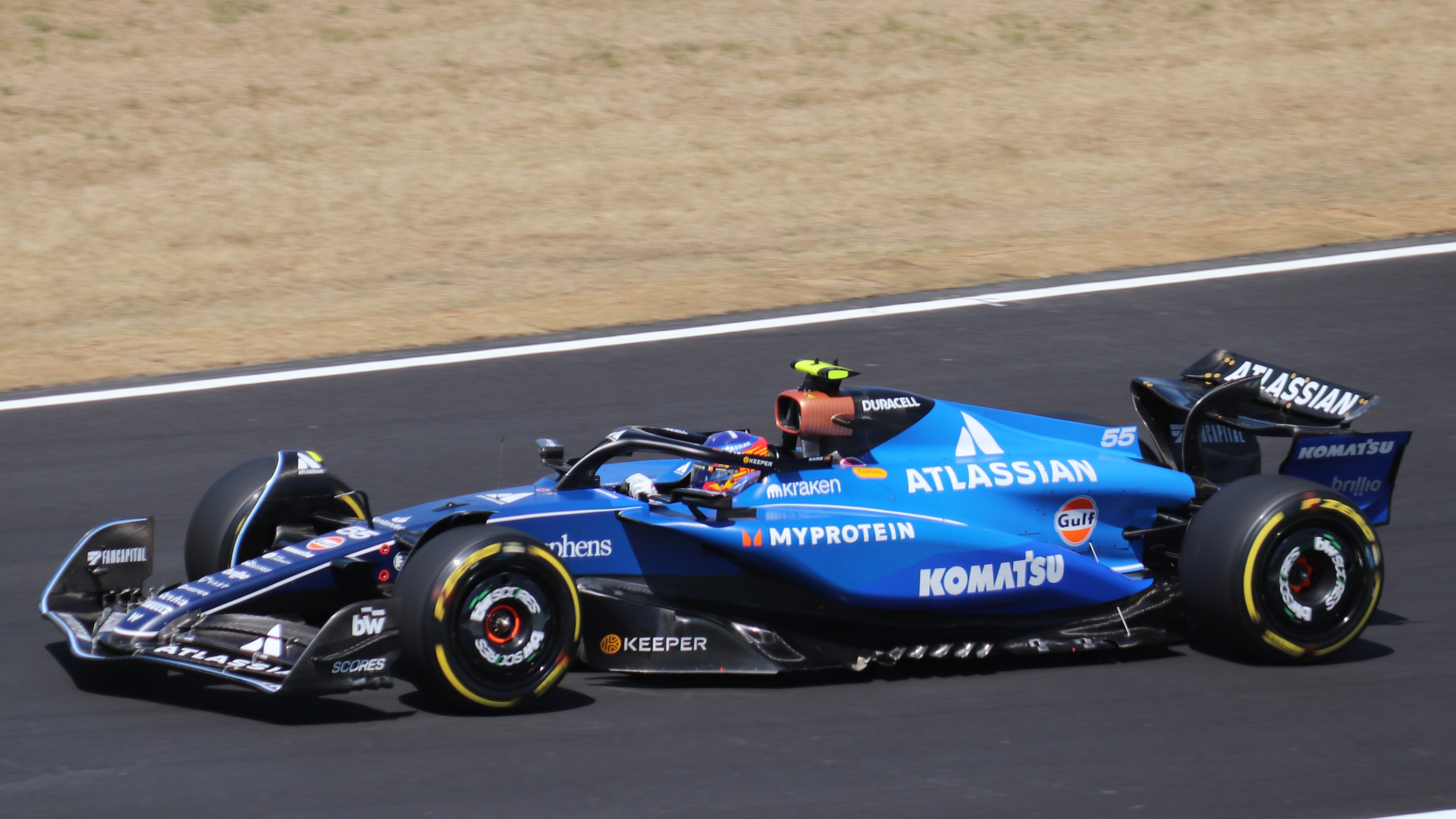
Carlos Sainz Jr. in a Williams at the 2025 Japanese Grand Prix

There have been fifteen Formula One drivers from Spain, the most successful of them being Fernando Alonso who won the World Drivers' Championship twice. Alonso is the only Spanish champion and one of only two Spanish drivers to win a Grand Prix, the other being Carlos Sainz Jr. Two other Spanish drivers have achieved a podium with Pedro de la Rosa and Alfonso de Portago having taken one apiece.

== Current drivers ==
Fernando Alonso debuted in Formula One with Minardi, but the team struggled to produce a competitive car. He moved to Renault to take up a test role and was then given a racing seat with the team in 2003. He won the drivers' championship in 2005 and retained the title the following year. At the time he was the youngest race winner and youngest champion, though the records have since been surpassed by Sebastian Vettel. He moved to McLaren for the 2007 season but had a tense relationship with the team, returning to Renault for the next two years. In 2010 he became the lead driver for Ferrari, winning five races on the way to second in the championship. Alonso again finished 2nd in the championship in both 2012 and 2013. An Autosport survey taken by 217 Formula One drivers saw Alonso voted as the 9th greatest F1 driver of all time, and he has been labelled as "the greatest all-round driver in the sport". He left Formula One at the end of 2018, but returned for 2021, driving for Alpine. He achieved a podium in Qatar, and finished tenth in the championship. Alonso moved to Aston Martin in 2023, where he achieved 8 podiums. As of 2026, he races for Aston Martin.

Carlos Sainz Jr. began his Formula One career in 2015, driving for Scuderia Toro Rosso. He switched to Renault towards the end of 2017 and drove for them in 2018, and then moved to McLaren to replace countryman Alonso, where he drove in 2019 and 2020. There, he achieved two podiums, and he finished sixth in the championship in both years. Sainz then moved to Ferrari for 2021, where he achieved four podiums to finish fifth in the championship. At the 2022 British Grand Prix, Sainz took his first pole position and his first GP victory, becoming the second Spanish driver to do either. Sainz was released from Ferrari at the end of 2024 season and moved to Williams.

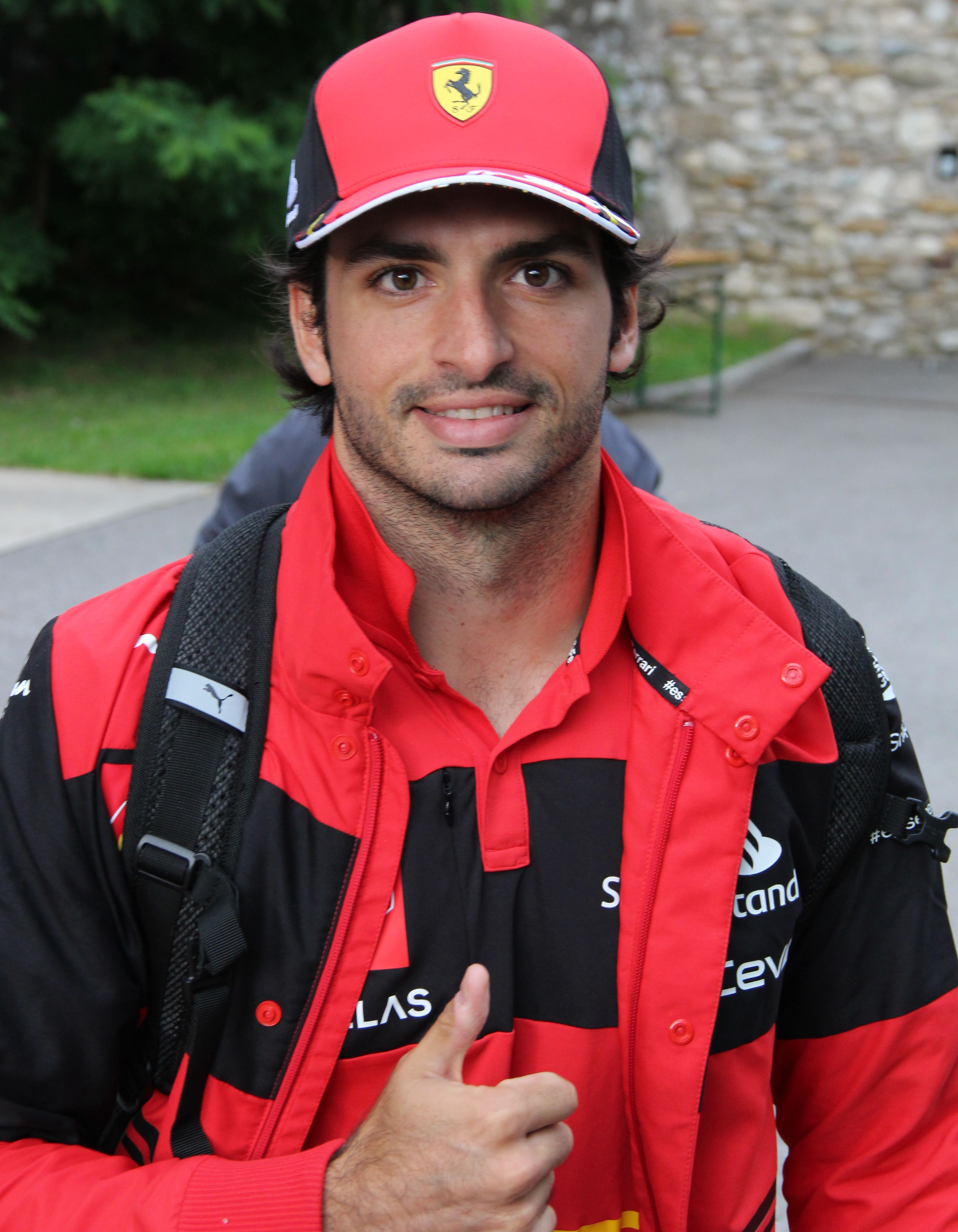
Carlos Sainz Jr.
2026 season position: 18th

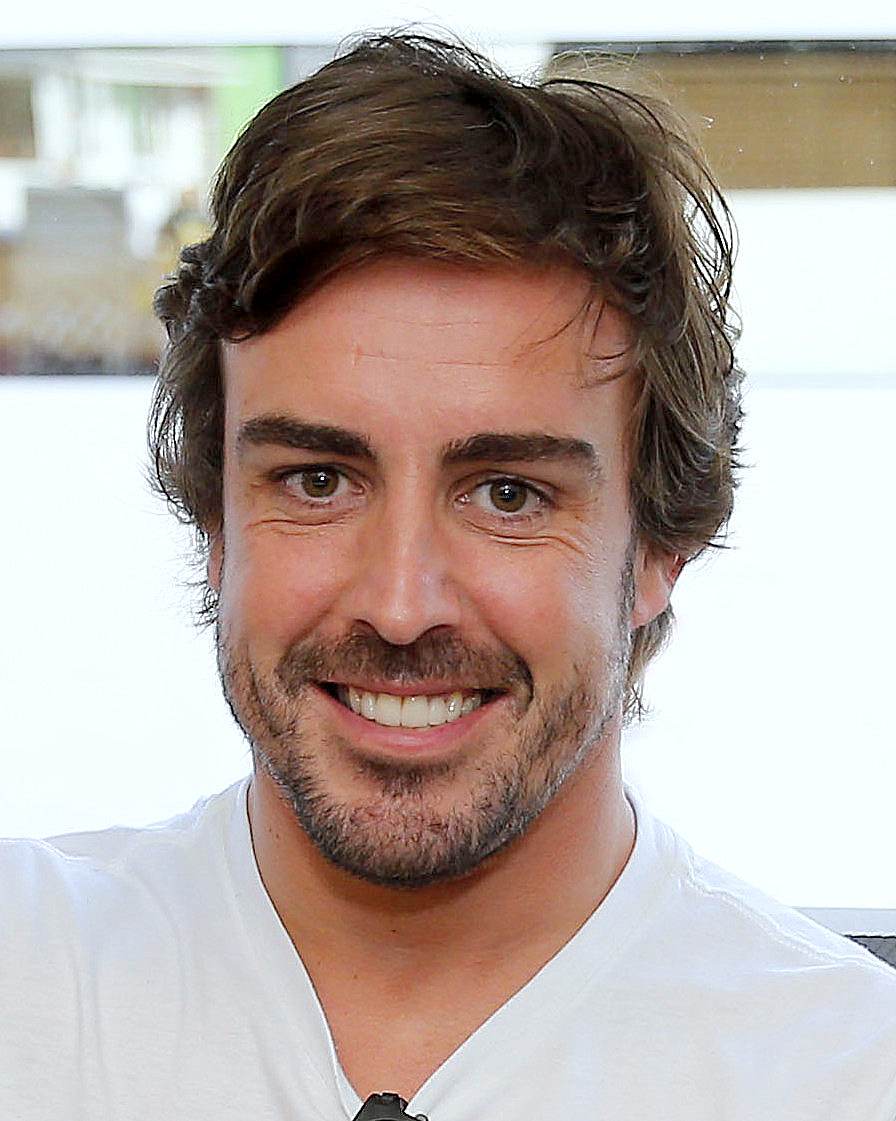
Fernando Alonso
2026 season position: 17th

== Former drivers ==
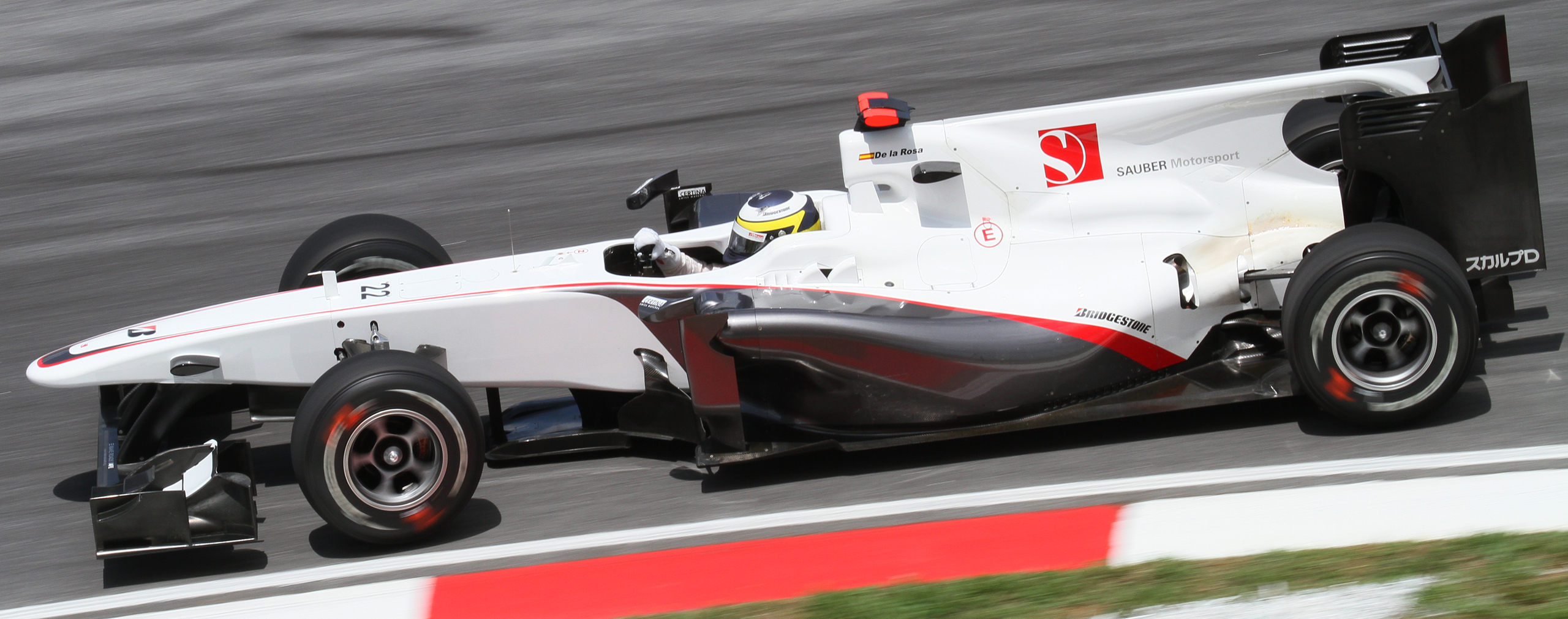
De la Rosa driving for Sauber at the 2010 Malaysian Grand Prix

Pedro de la Rosa has had a lengthy career in Formula One having debuted in 1999. He spent two years with Arrows before taking up a testing role at Jaguar. He was given the race seat as a replacement for Luciano Burti after four Grands Prix and remained with the team for the following year. He moved to McLaren as a test driver, only properly returning to racing when Juan Pablo Montoya left the team in 2006. During the remaining eight races he scored 19 points including a second-place finish. He lost his race seat to Lewis Hamilton but stayed as a test driver until 2010 when he signed with BMW Sauber. He was dropped after 14 races and went back to his testing role with McLaren. He once again secured a race seat, driving for HRT in 2012.

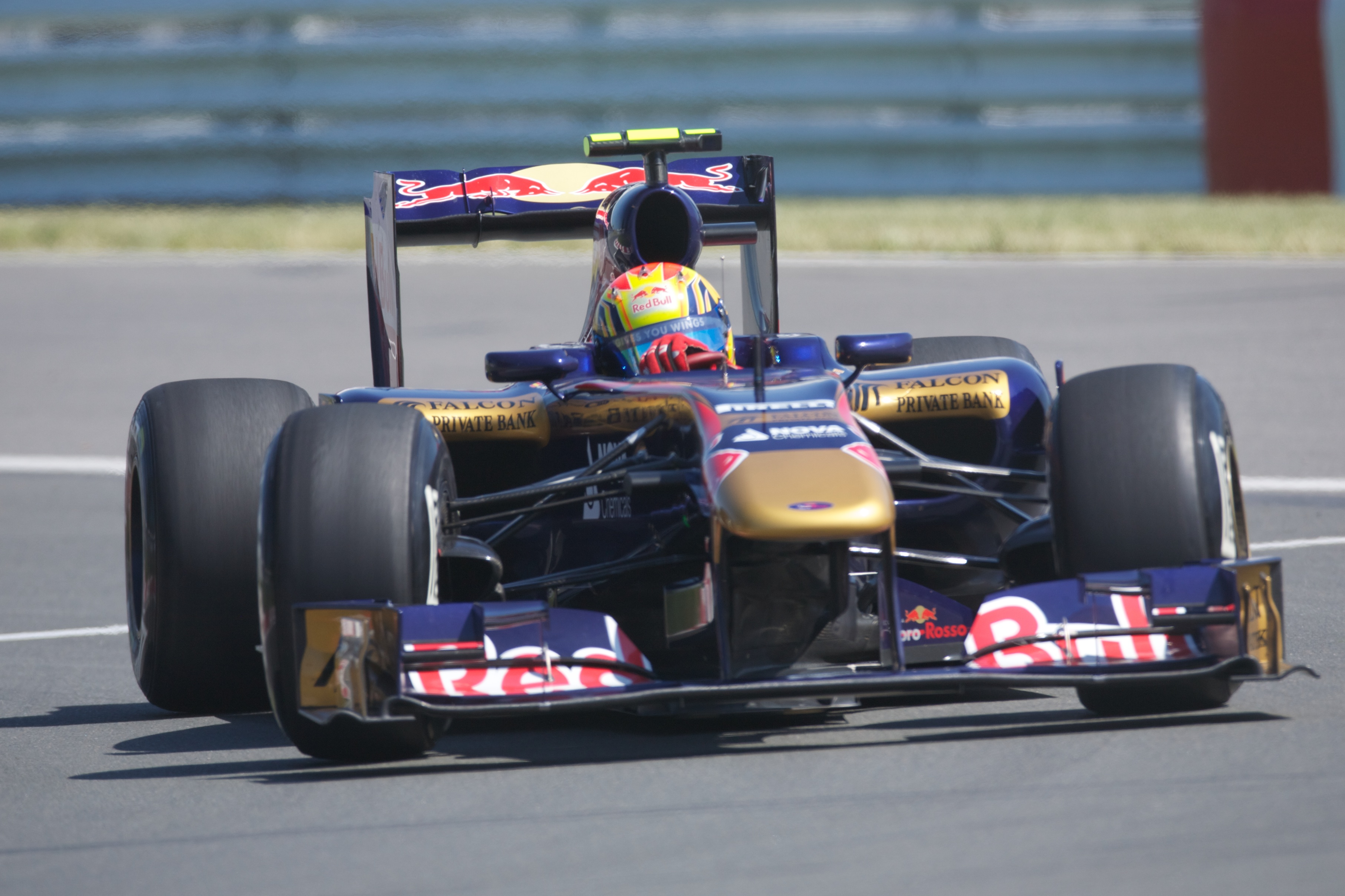
Alguersuari driving for Toro Rosso at the 2011 Canadian Grand Prix

Jaime Alguersuari made his debut midway through the 2009 season. He became the youngest driver to compete in Formula One, racing at the age of 19 years and 125 days. Toro Rosso released Sébastien Bourdais from his contract and signed Alguersuari who would also drive for the team in 2010 and 2011. He was dropped at the end of the year and did not pick up a racing seat for the 2012 season.

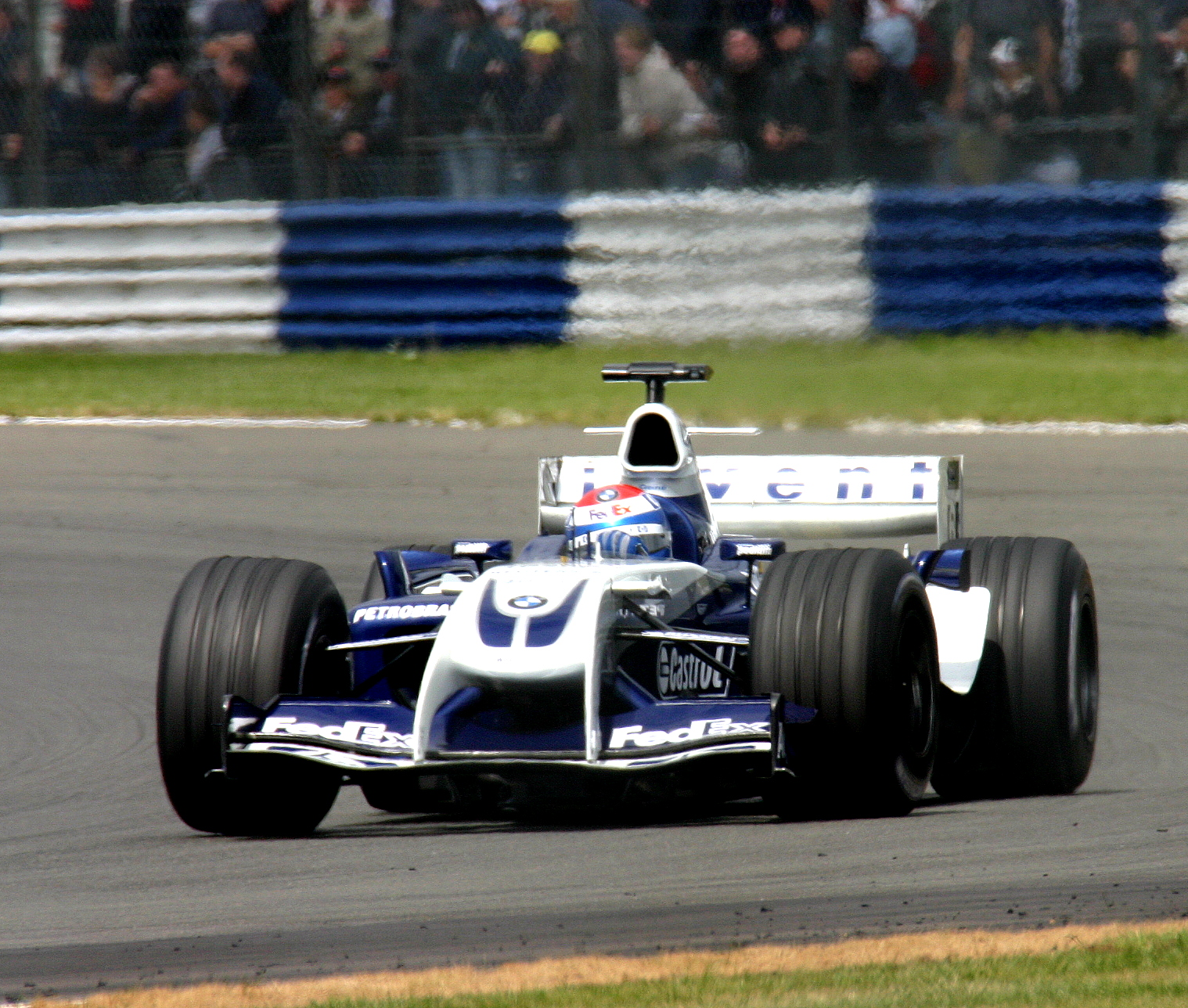
Gené driving for Williams at the 2004 British Grand Prix

Marc Gené started in Formula One in 1999 and drove for two seasons with Minardi. He signed as the test driver for Williams in 2001 and stood in for Ralf Schumacher once in 2003 and twice in 2004.

Luis Pérez-Sala was the team principal for Spanish team HRT, taking on the role in December 2011. As a driver Pérez-Sala raced with Minardi for the 1988 and 1989 seasons, finishing fewer than half the races and scoring one point for a sixth-place finish at the 1989 British Grand Prix.

Adrián Campos drove for Minardi in 1987 but had a very poor season, mainly due to mechanical unreliability. He finished just one race, his home Grand Prix, and was dropped in 1988 after failing to qualify for three consecutive races. In 1998 he started Campos Racing which competed in a variety of racing disciplines and achieved success with Marc Gené and Fernando Alonso. He successfully gained a place for the team on the 2010 F1 grid and it evolved, through a takeover led by Jose Ramon Carabante, into HRT.

Roberto Merhi raced for Manor Marussia in 2015.

Alfonso de Portago competed at six race weekends across 1956 and 1957 with Ferrari. He was classified as finishing second in the 1956 British Grand Prix, though he had given up his car to Peter Collins whose own Ferrari suffered a mechanical failure.

Emilio de Villota was entered for 14 races over four seasons but only qualified for two of them. Both races were with McLaren in 1977 and de Villota was unable to finish higher than 13th place. His daughter, María de Villota, was a Formula One test driver but did not compete at a race weekend. In July 2012 she was testing a Marussia when she crashed into a support truck, suffering head injuries that ended her racing career and would contribute to her death in 2013.

Paco Godia entered 14 races with Maserati over a career that spanned from 1951 to 1958. His best result came in 1956 when he finished in 4th place at the Italian and German Grands Prix.

Alex Soler-Roig made his debut in 1970 with Lotus but did not start any of the three races he was entered for. He switched to March for the following year and though he started four Grands Prix he was unable to finish any of them, nor did he complete the two races he began for BRM the following year.

Juan Jover (1951), Antonio Creus (1960), and Emilio Zapico (1976) all entered for just one Grand Prix each but did not complete their race.

== Timeline ==
Drivers	Active Years	Entries	Wins	Podiums	Career Points	Poles	Fastest Laps	Championships
Juan Jover	1951	1 (0 starts)	0	0	0	0	0	-
Paco Godia	1951, 1954, 1956–1958	14 (13 starts)	0	0	6	0	0	-
Alfonso de Portago	1956–1957	5	0	1	4	0	0	-
Antonio Creus	1960	1	0	0	0	0	0	-
Alex Soler-Roig	1970–1972	10 (6 starts)	0	0	0	0	0	-
Emilio Zapico	1976	1 (0 starts)	0	0	0	0	0	-
Emilio de Villota	1976–1978, 1981–1982	15 (2 starts)	0	0	0	0	0	-
Adrian Campos	1987–1988	21 (17 starts)	0	0	0	0	0	-
Luis Pérez-Sala	1988–1989	32 (26 starts)	0	0	1	0	0	-
Pedro de la Rosa	1999–2002, 2005–2006, 2010–2012	107 (104 starts)	0	1	35	0	1	-
Marc Gené	1999–2000, 2003–2004	36	0	0	5	0	0	-
Fernando Alonso	2001–2018, 2021–2026	447 (444 starts)	32	106	2400	22	26	2 (2005, 2006)
Jaime Alguersuari	2009–2011	46	0	0	31	0	0	-
Roberto Merhi	2015	14 (13 starts)	0	0	0	0	0	-
Carlos Sainz Jr.	2015–2026	252 (248 starts)	4	29	1343.5	6	4	-

== See also ==
- List of Formula One Grand Prix winners
