= 1947 Bari Grand Prix =

- Non-championship race in the 1947 Formula One season
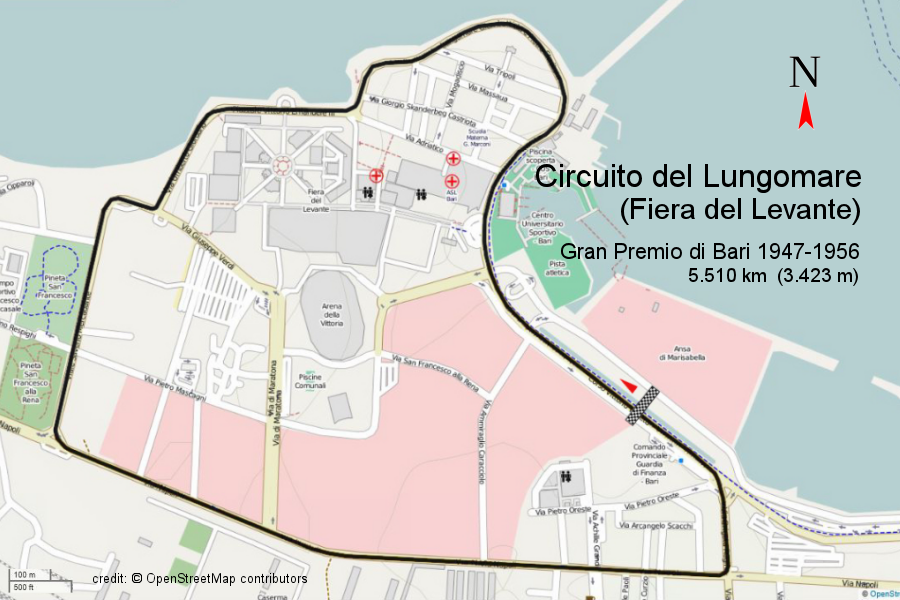

Race details
- Date: 13 July 1947
- Official name: I Gran Premio di Bari
- Location: Lungomare Circuit, Bari, Italy
- Course: Temporary street circuit
- Course length: 5.339 km (3.318 mi)
- Distance: 50 laps, 266.949 km (165.874 mi)

Pole position
Driver	(Italy) Achille Varzi	Alfa Romeo
- Time: not available

Fastest lap
Driver	(Italy) Achille Varzi	Alfa Romeo
- Time: 2:49.0

Podium
First	(Italy) Achille Varzi	Alfa Romeo
Second	(Italy) Consalvo Sanesi	Alfa Romeo
Third	(Italy) Renato Balestrero (Italy) Enrico Ziegler	Alfa Romeo

The 1st Bari Grand Prix was a Formula One motor race held on 13 July 1947 at the Lungomare Circuit, in Bari, Italy. The 50-lap race was won by Achille Varzi in an Alfa Romeo 158, who also started from pole and set fastest lap. Varzi's team mate Consalvo Sanesi finished second, and Renato Balestrero and Enrico Ziegler shared third in an Alfa Romeo 8C.

== Results ==
Pos	No.	Driver	Entrant	Constructor	Time/Retired	Grid
1	12	(Italy) Achille Varzi	Alfa Corse	Alfa Romeo 158	2:32:27.2, 105.23 kph	1
2	13	(Italy) Consalvo Sanesi	Alfa Corse	Alfa Romeo 158	+2.8s	2
3	19	(Italy) Renato Balestrero (Italy) Enrico Ziegler	Renato Balestrero	Alfa Romeo 8C	+7 laps	5
4	15	(Italy) Nino Grieco	Scuderia Milano	Maserati 4CL	+9 laps	8
5	22	(Italy) Raymond de Saugé	R. de Saugé	Cisitalia D46	+10 laps	9
6	14	(Italy) Pasquale Cassano	Scuderia Milano	Maserati 4CL	+22 laps	6
7	21	(Italy) Liborio Fasano	Liborio Fassano	Alfa Romeo 8C 2300	+42 laps	11
Ret	17	(Spain) Juan Jover	Scuderia Milano	Maserati 4CL	19 laps, engine	10
Ret	20	(Brazil) Chico Landi	Enrico Platé	Maserati 4CL	16 laps, spark plugs	3
Ret	18	(Italy) Luigi Marchetti	Scuderia Milano	Maserati 4CL	7 laps, brakes	4
DSQ	16	(Italy) Gaetano dell'Acqua	Scuderia Milano	Maserati 4CM	21 laps, pushed car	7

Grand Prix Race
1947 Grand Prix season
Previous race: —	Bari Grand Prix	Next race: 1948 Bari Grand Prix
