= 2003 Malaysian Grand Prix =

Coordinates: 2°45′39″N 101°44′18″E

Race 2 of 16 in the 2003 Formula One World Championship
← Previous race	Next race →

Race details
- Date: 23 March 2003
- Official name: 2003 Petronas Malaysian Grand Prix
- Location: Sepang International Circuit, Sepang, Selangor, Malaysia
- Course: Permanent racing facility
- Course length: 5.543 km (3.444 miles)
- Distance: 56 laps, 310.408 km (192.879 miles)
- Weather: Fine, air temperature 34°C (93°F)
- Attendance: 101,485

Pole position
Driver	(Spain) Fernando Alonso	Renault
- Time: 1:37.044

Fastest lap
Driver	(Germany) Michael Schumacher	Ferrari
- Time: 1:36.412 on lap 45

Podium
First	(Finland) Kimi Räikkönen	McLaren-Mercedes
Second	(Brazil) Rubens Barrichello	Ferrari
Third	(Spain) Fernando Alonso	Renault

The 2003 Malaysian Grand Prix (officially the 2003 Petronas Malaysian Grand Prix) was a Formula One motor race held at the Sepang International Circuit in Sepang, Selangor, Malaysia on 23 March 2003 before 101,485 spectators. It was the second race of the 2003 Formula One World Championship and the fifth Formula One Malaysian Grand Prix. McLaren driver Kimi Räikkönen won the 56-lap race starting from seventh position. Ferrari's Rubens Barrichello finished second with Renault's Fernando Alonso third.

Before the race, McLaren's David Coulthard was leading the World Drivers' Championship however the Scot retired with electrical problems on lap three. Alonso qualified on pole position after setting the fastest lap time in the second qualifying session, becoming the youngest Formula One pole sitter. He maintained the lead at the start and held it until his first pit stop on lap 14. This promoted Räikkönen to first place, which he held for most of the rest of the race to achieve his maiden Formula One victory. Barrichello was 39.2 seconds down in second, and Alonso finished third, his first podium finish.

The result meant Räikkönen took over the World Drivers' Championship lead from his teammate Coulthard with 16 championship points. Coulthard's retirement dropped him to second ahead of Williams driver Juan Pablo Montoya in third as Montoya failed to score any championship points. McLaren extended their World Constructors' Championship lead to ten championship points, with Ferrari moving from fourth to second and Renault retaining third with 14 races remaining in the season.

== Background ==
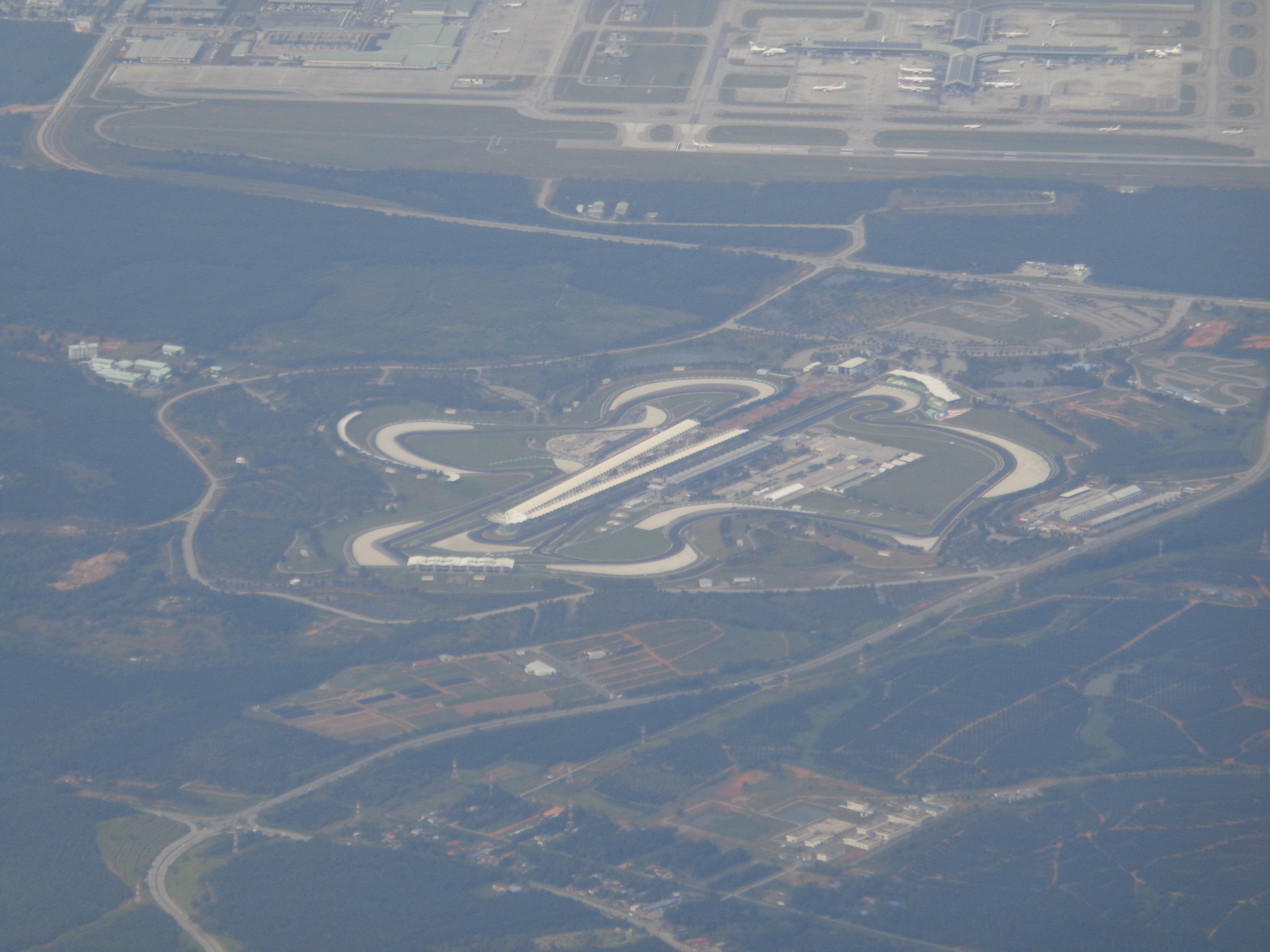
The Sepang International Circuit, where the race was held

The second of sixteen races in the 2003 Formula One World Championship, the Malaysian Grand Prix took place on March 23 at the 15-turn 5.543 km (3.444 mi) Sepang International Circuit in Sepang, Selangor. It was the fifth Formula One World Championship Malaysian Grand Prix. The Formula BMW Asian Championship, Formula Malaysia and Porsche Carrera Cup Asia held support races during the race weekend. The Fédération Internationale de l'Automobile (FIA), motorsport's governing body, had sanctioned a race in Malaysia since the 1960s, with the initial events staged in Singapore, then part of the Malaysian Federation, before moving to the Shah Alam Circuit. When the Formula One Grand Prix arrived in 1999, it was moved to the purpose-built Sepang International Circuit, where it remained until 2017.

After winning the season-opening Australian Grand Prix two weeks earlier, McLaren driver David Coulthard led the World Drivers' Championship with ten championship points. Williams' Juan Pablo Montoya was second with eight championship points, followed by Coulthard's teammate Kimi Räikkönen with six, Ferrari's Michael Schumacher with five and Renault's Jarno Trulli on four. McLaren led the World Constructors' Championship with 16 championship points, seven more than Williams and ten ahead of Renault. Ferrari were fourth with five championship points, one ahead of Sauber in fifth.

Following the Australian Grand Prix on 9 March, the British American Racing (BAR), McLaren, Toyota and Williams teams tested for three days from 12 to 14 March at Spain's Circuito de Jerez before the Malaysian Grand Prix. Toyota's Cristiano da Matta set the pace on the first and second days. Takuma Sato, BAR's test driver, led on the third and final day. Felipe Massa, Ferrari's test driver, spent four days testing Bridgestone tyres at Italy's Fiorano Circuit.

The American-led invasion of Iraq began four days before the race, raising security worries for the Malaysian Grand Prix. Multiple drivers, including Ferrari's Michael Schumacher and Rubens Barrichello, expressed their desire for the race to proceed as planned. Jamaluddin Jarjis, Malaysia's junior finance minister, stated that the Grand Prix would take place, but that war concerns had discouraged European visitors from attending. The race organisers gathered to consider their next steps and decided to proceed with the race. The FIA and Formula One chief Bernie Ecclestone granted Minardi's request to run an anti-war statement on the side of their cars after team owner Paul Stoddart proposed it to Malaysian ministers.

Michael Schumacher lost the championship lead in Australia for the first time since September 2000. Despite this, he stated the competition was closer and was confident he had a good chance of winning in Malaysia. While he was happy to win the Australian Grand Prix, Coulthard cautioned against dismissing Ferrari's performance. He aimed for a podium finish in Malaysia. Montoya said it would be "pretty difficult" to judge how well Williams would perform at Sepang, "We might be really good or we might be 10th. I don't know." He thought the hot climate should suit the Williams car. Renault's Fernando Alonso said of his chances, "It was a good race in Australia. But I can't say how it's going to be here. We're trying hard to get more power in the car and once we get that, it'll be good for us."

A total of ten teams (each represented by a different constructor) entered two race drivers each for the race with no changes from the season entry list. Bridgestone and Michelin were the two companies manufacturing tyres for the race. Since the inaugural Malaysian Grand Prix, the main difficulty in event preparation has been heat dissipation, which is exacerbated by Malaysia's high temperatures and humidity. All the teams had different solutions to combat this. Ferrari fitted cut chimneys and enlarged the vents in the back of the bodywork. The team continued to use the year-old F2002 chassis, while their fuel supplier Shell provided enhanced fuel to help improve engine performance. Williams took a similar approach, although McLaren chose not to use chimneys in conjunction with exhaust terminals. Renault used the test session to run an upgraded engine and assess various cooling systems for the R23 car. BAR used a revised Honda engine specification and Toyota modified the TF103's fuel circuit to address the fuel pressure system issue that affected Olivier Panis' car in Australia.

== Private test session ==
Teams that opted for limited testing during the season were given a two-hour test session on Friday morning. The track was wet from overnight thunderstorms, but the air and track temperatures were warm, so drivers used intermediate tyres before switching to dry compounds. Alonso set the best lap time of 1:37.693, ahead of Jordan's Giancarlo Fisichella, Trulli and Renault's test driver Allan McNish. Some drivers spun during the session. Jaguar's Mark Webber put his left-rear wheel onto the grass under braking and spun into the turn 14 gravel trap on the start of the back straight at high speed. He returned to the pit lane with suspension damage.

== Practice and warm-up sessions ==
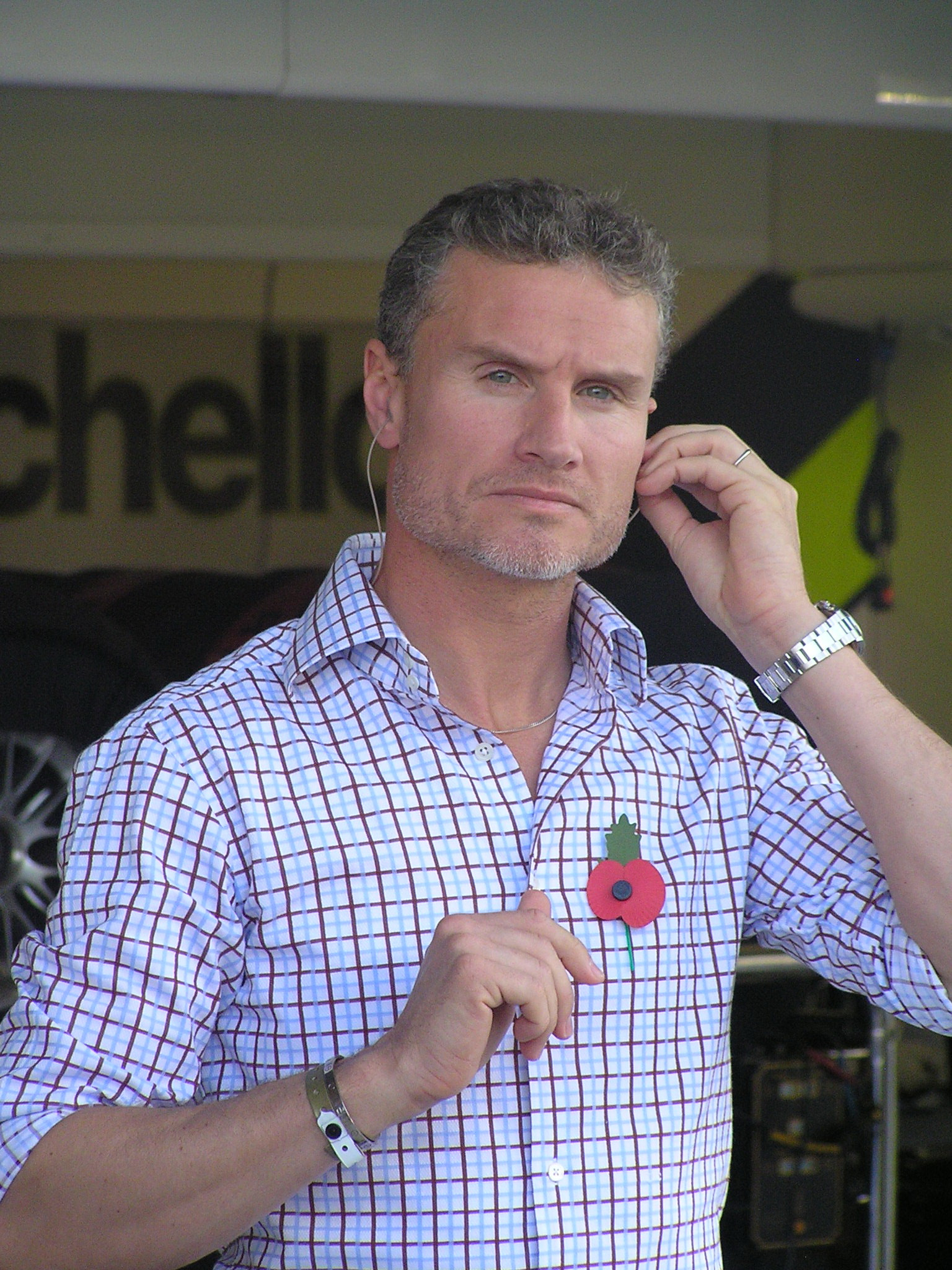
David Coulthard (pictured in 2009) was the fastest driver in the Friday practice session

There were three practice sessions preceding Sunday's race: one 60-minute session on Friday and two 45-minute sessions on Saturday. Conditions were dry and warm for the first practice session on Friday morning and the track was completely dry. Coulthard set the quickest lap just before the session ended, 1:36.102. He was 0.129 seconds faster than Alonso, followed by Renault teammate Trulli. The Williams pair of Montoya and Ralf Schumacher, BAR's Jenson Button, Michael Schumacher, Button's teammate Jacques Villeneuve, Barrichello and Panis completed the top ten. Some drivers ran off the track during the session. Antônio Pizzonia's Jaguar lost its front wing after running into a gravel trap. Sauber's Heinz-Harald Frentzen stopped at turn seven with a faulty electrical connector and his car was towed into the pit lane by marshals. He drove the spare Sauber car for the rest of the session. Jordan's Ralph Firman's ran into the gravel trap when the front-left suspension failed under braking for turn 15.

Saturday morning's second practice session was held in humid and warm conditions. Coulthard was fastest with a lap time of 1:36.777, 0.421 seconds ahead of Trulli. Alonso, Montoya, Fisichella, Panis, Räikkönen, Pizzonia, Ralf Schumacher and Firman made up positions three to ten. Around 25 minutes into the session, Michael Schumacher went backwards into the gravel trap leaving the left-hand turn 12 at 270 km/h (170 mph). He stopped on the far side, damaging the undertray, which Ferrari replaced. His anti-stall system triggered, allowing him to extricate himself from the gravel and return to the Ferrari garage. Coulthard spun at the final corner while Webber made a driver error but avoided damaging his Jaguar.

In the final practice, which took place in humid and warm conditions later on Saturday morning, midway through the session, Räikkönen set the quickest lap time of 1:36.557, 0.220 seconds faster than teammate Coulthard. Alonso, Michael Schumacher, Da Matta, Trulli, Montoya, Button, Barrichello and Ralf Schumacher followed in the top ten. During the session, Coulthard ran off the track and into the gravel traps twice, first at turn six and again at turn seven, but his car was not damaged either time. Justin Wilson's left-rear wheel came off the Minardi car on his first lap. His car was recovered to the pit lane. A 15-minute warm-up session held in dry and hot weather saw Räikkönen go fastest with a 1:37.506 lap, followed by his teammate Coulthard, Barrichello, Alonso, Panis, Trulli, Button, Montoya, Villeneuve and Ralf Schumacher.

== Qualifying ==
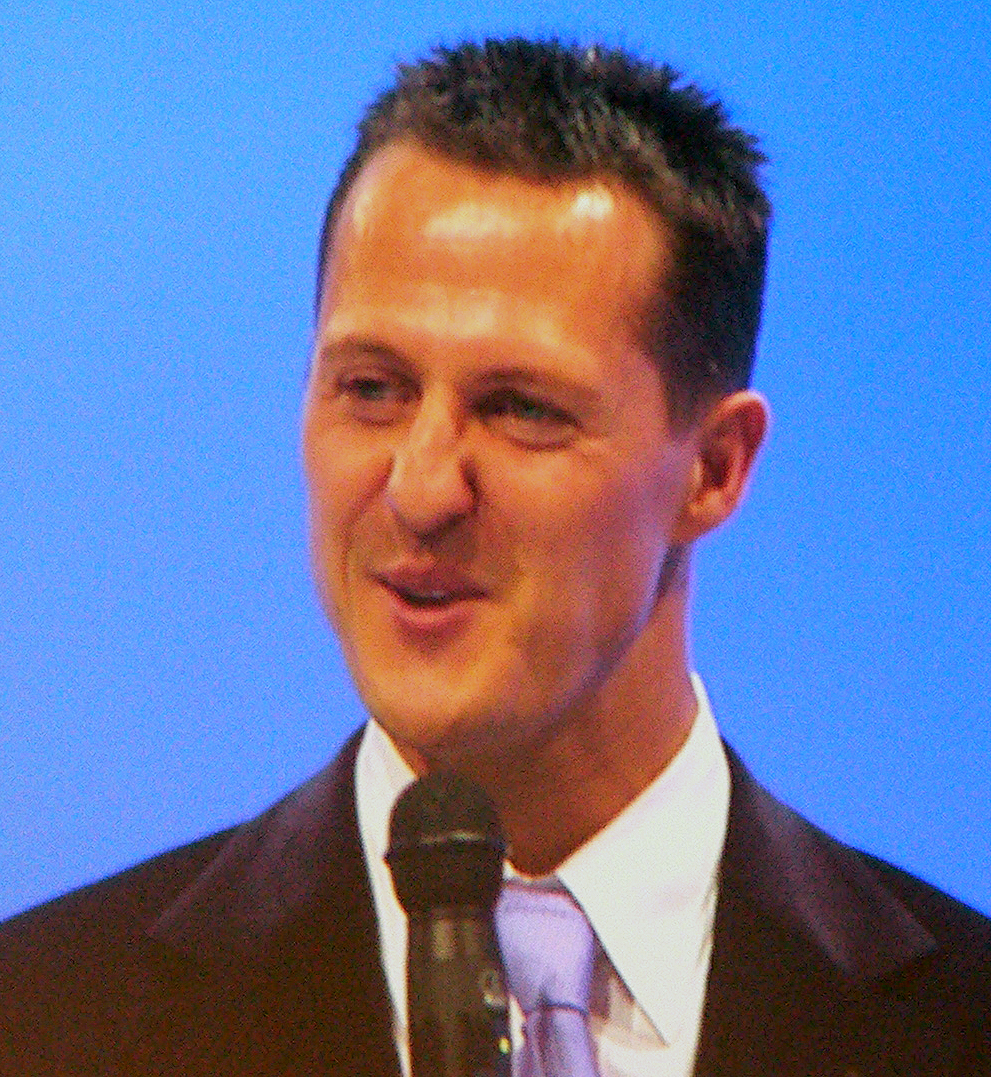
Michael Schumacher (pictured in 2007) paced the field in the first qualifying session

There were two one-hour qualifying sessions on both Friday and Saturday afternoons. The World Drivers' Championship standings determined the running order for the first session (first to last), with the second session's running order reversed from the results of the first session (slowest to quickest). In each session, each driver recorded one timed lap with no other cars on track, and the starting order was set by the quickest laps in the second session. The first qualifying session was held in hot and humid conditions that gradually became less intense. Michael Schumacher was fastest in all three sectors, lapping at 1:34.980. His teammate Barrichello was the last driver to set a lap after crashing in Australia. He was less happy with his car's balance and was second, 0.7 seconds slower. Montoya had severe oversteer in his car and pushed hard to go third. Räikkönen was fourth after locking up into turn one during his lap. Coulthard was the first to set a lap, although he drove conservatively to avoid making an error, going fifth. Trulli was the faster Renault driver in sixth. Nick Heidfeld ran a clean lap to finish seventh after Sauber adjusted his car's aerodynamic set-up to counter ride height issues. His teammate Frentzen was eighth after changing his aerodynamic setup. Button took ninth because his oversteer could not be dialled out with racing setup changes. Alonso was unable to match his teammate Trulli due to more oversteer than he wanted in the final sector, going 10th. Da Matta's Toyota had excessive oversteer and lacked traction due to it jumping around on the bumps, as well as him locking the tyres in the final corner, leaving him 11th. Fisichella was 12th due to lost time with excess tyre graining in the final three turns. Ralf Schumacher battled heavy oversteer on his lap and came 13th despite making no major mistakes on his fast lap. Panis had similar troubles to teammate Da Matta, but he bounced on the kerbing and took 14th. Villeneuve (15th) lost time as he ran wide at turn 14 and was slower down the back straight. Webber, 16th lost time due to a fuel pick-up issue. Firman in 17th had excessive oversteer. Jos Verstappen was the faster Minardi driver in 18th. His teammate Wilson struggled in the first sector because of his unfamiliarlity with the track and ran sideways in the final sector, taking 19th. Pizzonia did not set a lap time; his car would not start because of fuel pick-up issues.

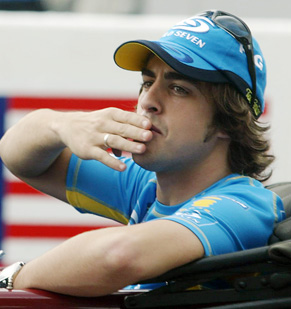
Fernando Alonso (pictured in 2006) qualified on pole position in the second qualifying session, becoming the youngest pole sitter in Formula One history.

The second qualifying session was held in dry and humid conditions, which gradually dropped in intensity. In his second race for the Renault team, Alonso secured the first pole position of his career with a lap time of 1:37.044, using the soft Michelin tyre compound and a lower fuel load. He became the youngest Formula One pole sitter aged 21 years, 7 months, and 23 days, (Note: The record was surpassed by Sebastian Vettel, who qualified on pole position for the 2008 Italian Grand Prix, aged 21 years, 2 months and 11 days.) breaking Barrichello's record from the 1994 Belgian Grand Prix by six months. Alonso took the first pole position for a Spanish driver, ending Michael Schumacher's streak of poles in Malaysia dating back to 1999. Trulli came second on the soft Michelin tyre compound, 0.173 seconds behind his teammate. This was Renault's first front-row lockout since Alain Prost and Eddie Cheever in the 1983 French Grand Prix. Michael Schumacher had gearbox trouble during the warm-up, so it was replaced. He took third despite losing time due to increased oversteer in his tyres as track temperatures dropped. Coulthard, fourth, experienced moderate understeer in turn nine and the corner before the back straight, slowing him out of corners; he qualified ahead of his teammate Räikkönen for the second time in the season. Despite losing three-tenths of a second due to a mistake between turns 13 and 14, Barrichello was conservative and half a second down in fifth. Heidfeld secured sixth by using less fuel than teammate Frentzen and completing a clean lap. Räikkönen locked the rear brakes while braking for the hairpin and slid sideways, losing time and taking seventh. Montoya was slower than the Renaults early on and lacked traction on the main straight, slowing him. He complained about understeer, which landed him in eighth, and wished he had more front wing. Button made errors in the final two sectors because he thought he could gain time under braking by pushing hard, qualifying ninth. Panis continued to drive a jumpy car, lapping three-thousandths of a second faster than teammate Da Matta in 10th. Da Matta, 11th, had to drive the spare Toyota due to a clutch issue in his race car. Villeneuve (12th) lost time due to an error at the hairpin and understeer. Frentzen, the slower Sauber driver, was 13th due to a heavy fuel load, running an error-free lap. Fisichella qualified 14th on the harder Bridgestone compound tyres. Pizzonia was the first driver to set a lap time. He ran conservatively and a light fuel load for 15th, experiencing snap oversteer. For the first time in his career, Webber was outqualified by a teammate. He lost three-tenths of a second at the hairpin and was 16th. Ralf Schumacher took 17th after two driver errors lost him time. Verstappen qualified 18th, ahead of Minardi teammate Wilson in 19th, despite having greater oversteer than in practice and balancing issues. Firman decided to run a heavy fuel load; he qualified 20th and last, with power oversteer that intensified near the end of his lap as the temperatures rose and a lack of grip.

=== Qualifying classification ===
Pos	No.	Driver	Constructor	Q1 Time	Q2 Time	Gap	Grid
1	8	(Spain) Fernando Alonso	Renault	1:36.693	1:37.044	—	1
2	7	(Italy) Jarno Trulli	Renault	1:36.301	1:37.217	+0.173	2
3	1	(Germany) Michael Schumacher	Ferrari	1:34.980	1:37.393	+0.349	3
4	5	(United Kingdom) David Coulthard	McLaren-Mercedes	1:36.297	1:37.454	+0.410	4
5	2	(Brazil) Rubens Barrichello	Ferrari	1:35.681	1:37.579	+0.535	5
6	9	(Germany) Nick Heidfeld	Sauber-Petronas	1:36.407	1:37.766	+0.722	6
7	6	(Finland) Kimi Räikkönen	McLaren-Mercedes	1:36.038	1:37.858	+0.814	7
8	3	(Colombia) Juan Pablo Montoya	Williams-BMW	1:35.939	1:37.974	+0.930	8
9	17	(United Kingdom) Jenson Button	BAR-Honda	1:36.632	1:38.073	+1.029	9
10	20	(France) Olivier Panis	Toyota	1:36.995	1:38.094	+1.050	10
11	21	(Brazil) Cristiano da Matta	Toyota	1:36.706	1:38.097	+1.053	11
12	16	(Canada) Jacques Villeneuve	BAR-Honda	1:37.585	1:38.289	+1.245	12
13	10	(Germany) Heinz-Harald Frentzen	Sauber-Petronas	1:36.615	1:38.291	+1.247	13
14	11	(Italy) Giancarlo Fisichella	Jordan-Ford	1:36.759	1:38.416	+1.372	14
15	15	(Brazil) Antônio Pizzonia	Jaguar-Cosworth	No time^{1}	1:38.516	+1.472	15
16	14	(Australia) Mark Webber	Jaguar-Cosworth	1:37.669	1:38.624	+1.580	16
17	4	(Germany) Ralf Schumacher	Williams-BMW	1:36.805	1:38.789	+1.745	17
18	19	(Netherlands) Jos Verstappen	Minardi-Cosworth	1:38.904	1:40.417	+3.373	18
19	18	(United Kingdom) Justin Wilson	Minardi-Cosworth	1:39.354	1:40.599	+3.555	19
20	12	(Republic of Ireland) Ralph Firman	Jordan-Ford	1:38.240	1:40.910	+3.866	20

Notes

- ^1 – Antônio Pizzonia set no time in the first qualifying session due to a fuel pick-up problem issue in the car.

== Race ==
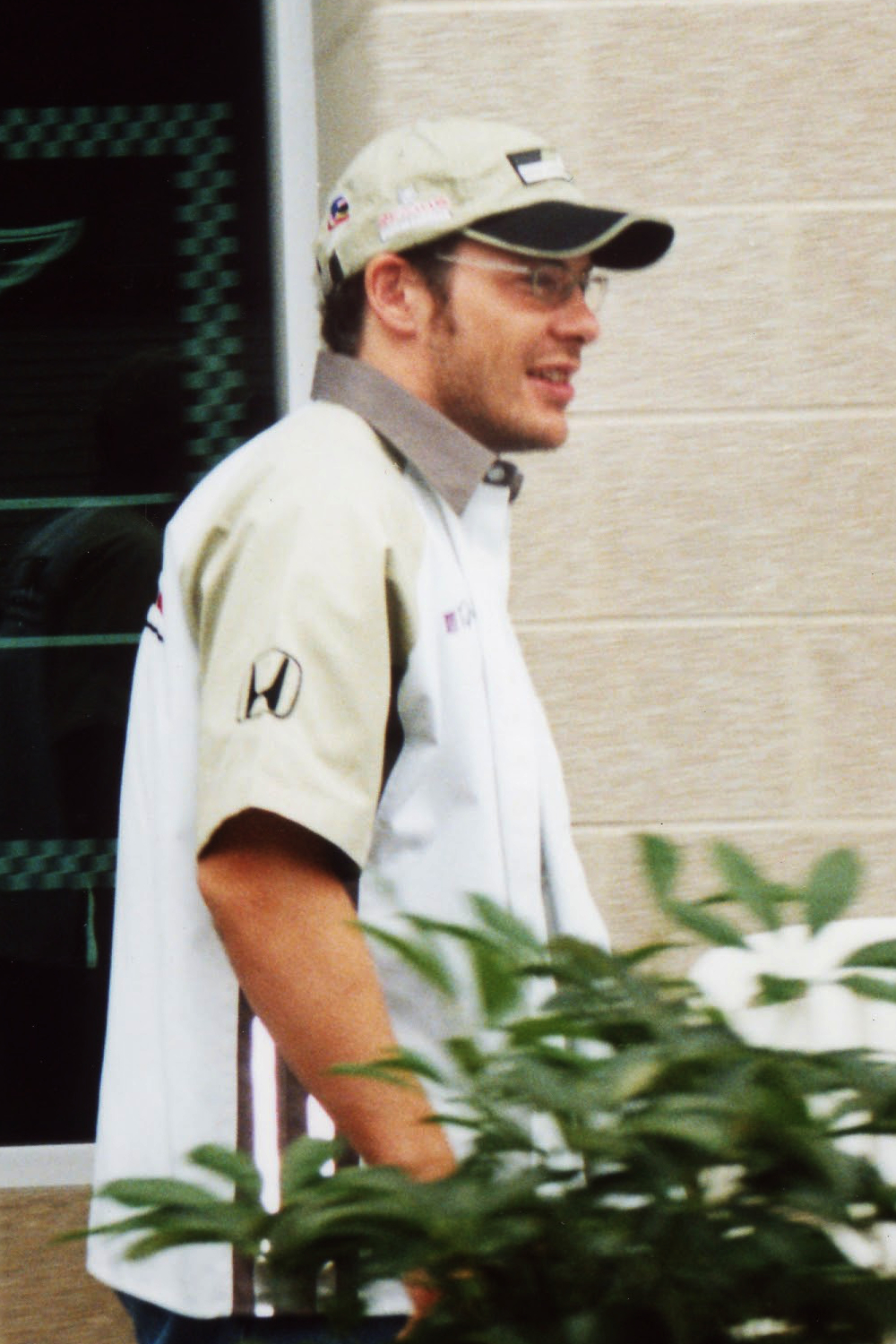
Jacques Villeneuve (pictured in 2002) failed to start the race because of an electrical problem causing the gearbox in his car to fail.

The race began at 15:00 local time, partially cloudy but dry, in front of 101,485 spectators. Before the race, rain was expected, with a 60% chance of heavy showers. Some people forecast high humidity, which caused the teams to be divided tactically. The air temperature was 35 to 36 °C (95 to 97 °F) and the asphalt temperature was between 45 to 53 °C (113 to 127 °F). The race stewards granted Barrichello permission not to wear the HANS device based on the recommendation of FIA medical delegate Sid Watkins because he had a small hernia that made driving his Ferrari uncomfortable. Villeneuve's gearbox failed due to an electrical malfunction, which prevented him from starting the formation lap. He ran to the pit lane garage to use the spare car, but this was illegal by the rules unless approved by the race stewards. Villeneuve's team told him that he needed to return to his race car, which had failed to start. Da Matta began the race from the pit lane for driving the spare Toyota. This caused confusion as Fisichella ran into the wrong grid slot and had to reverse to the correct place, parking at an angle to the circuit.

When the five red lights went out to start the race, Alonso, who had a 38.5 °C (101.3 °F) fever, maintained the lead heading into the first corner. Coulthard made a quick start to overtake Michael Schumacher and attempted to pass Trulli for second place, but was stopped at the end of the main straight. Michael Schumacher attempted a dive down the inside of Trulli at the left-hand turn two to retake third from Coulthard, but there was insufficient space. He hit Trulli's rear tyre, sending Trulli spinning into the grass and to the back of the running order. This set off a chain reaction in which Pizzonia collided with Montoya's car from behind, removing Montoya's rear wing and Pizzonia's front wing and propelling Pizzonia into the air. Then Pizzonia veered into Verstappen. Montoya, Verstappen and Pizzonia made pit stops at the end of the first lap for replacement car parts. This moved Coulthard to second and Heidfeld to third. Further back, Fisichella was left on the starting grid due to an electrical launch control system failed owing to the clutch overheating, and he was unable to start.

At the conclusion of lap one, Alonso led Coulthard by 2.4 seconds. They were followed in turn by Heidfeld, Räikkönen, Button, Barrichello, Panis and the fast-starting Wilson. Alonso raced away from the field, with Räikkönen battling Heidfeld for third. On lap three, at the end of the main straight before turn one, Räikkönen overtook Heidfeld for third. On the same lap, Coulthard retired on the grass due to an electronics failure. On lap four, Michael Schumacher made a pit stop for a replacement nose cone, fuel and tyres. He rejoined the circuit in 14th. Montoya returned at the back of the field, two laps down. Ralf Schumacher and Webber both overtook Wilson to move into seventh and eighth on the same lap. On lap five, Barrichello passed Button for fourth heading into the first corner. Panis overtook Button for fifth at Langkawi Curve turn and Trulli passed Wilson for ninth.

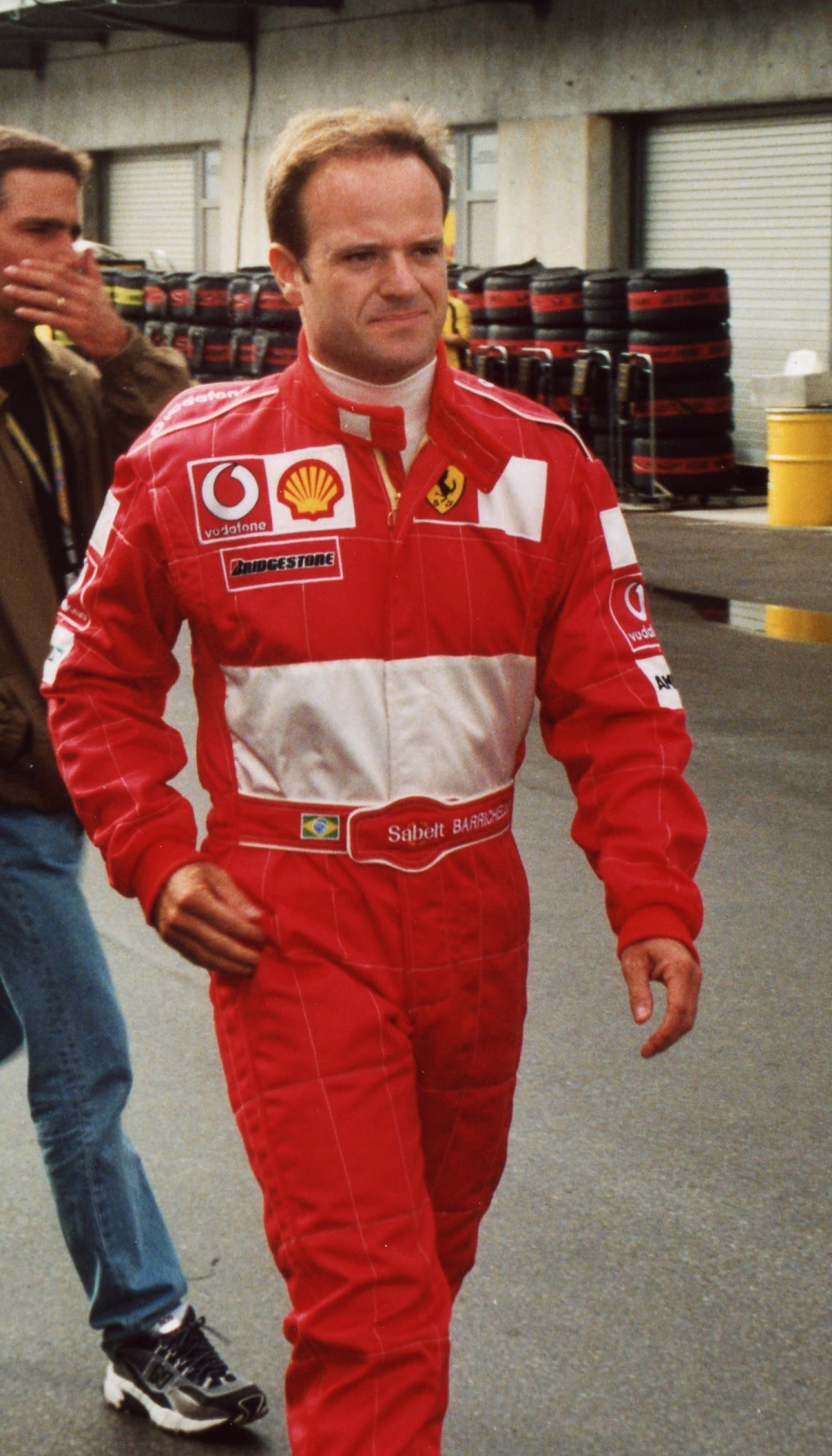
Rubens Barrichello (pictured in 2002) finished the race in second position

While Räikkönen was slowly gaining on race leader Alonso, whose soft compound tyres were deteriorating, Michael Schumacher received a drive-through penalty "for causing an avoidable accident" as a result of his first-lap collision with Trulli. He served the penalty at the conclusion of lap nine. He remained in 14th, but was 89 seconds behind the race leader. Barrichello battled Heidfeld for third and overtook him into turn one on lap 10. The first round of pit stops began on the following lap. Panis was the first of the leaders to make a pit stop on lap 12. After rejoining the track, he passed Firman, but on the next lap, he pulled over to the side of the circuit to retire due to a fuel supply fault. At the end of lap 14, Alonso took his first pit stop for fuel and tyres while leading. He fell to fourth, behind Barrichello and Button. This promoted Räikkönen to first, leading Barrichello by 14.1 seconds. Seventh-placed Webber lost half a minute in pit lane after his clutch malfunctioned trying to leave on lap 15, dropping him to 13th. Button, Da Matta, Frentzen made pit stops over the next three laps.

Räikkönen held the lead until his first pit stop at the end of lap 19, when he used his McLaren's lighter fuel load to set quicker lap times. He rejoined the track after a 10.8-second stop in second, behind Barrichello but in front of Alonso. Trulli was in Firman's car's aerodynamic turbulence and was unable to get close enough to overtake until the first turn on lap 21, but Firman retook sixth when Trulli ran wide. Barrichello gained time over Räikkönen before his first pit stop for fuel and tyres on lap 22. He fell to third, behind Räikkönen and Alonso. After the pit stops, Räikkönen led Alonso by nine seconds, with Barrichello catching him by two seconds per lap. By the time the second round of pit stops began on lap 34, Räikkönen had moved away from Alonso by 17.8 seconds. Trulli closed up to Button and battled for fifth, but he was unable to pass until Button's second pit stop on lap 34 because Trulli's Renault engine was less powerful than Button's Honda engine.

Just as Barrichello got close to him, Alonso made his second pit stop at the end of lap 35. Mechanics increased downforce on his Renault's front wing, and he rejoined the race in third, behind Barrichello. The next lap saw Webber retire in the garage due to an engine failure caused by an oil issue. Trulli was close behind Ralf Schumacher and was slightly slowed when he nearly collided with Schumacher's rear instead of following the wide path for his second pitstop on the same lap. Trulli's pit stop was complicated by an electrical malfunction that brought him to a halt and closed his fuel filler. The mechanics used a screwdriver to force open the fuel flap, losing Trulli ten seconds. He dropped to sixth. Barrichello was unhindered by slower cars for three laps before his second pit stop on lap 38. He remained in second, ahead of Alonso, who had a misfiring engine and lost the use of fifth gear. Räikkönen led by 53 seconds by the time of his final pit stop on lap 40. He stayed in the lead, ahead of Barrichello. Ralf Schumacher made a pit stop on the same lap and remained in fourth.

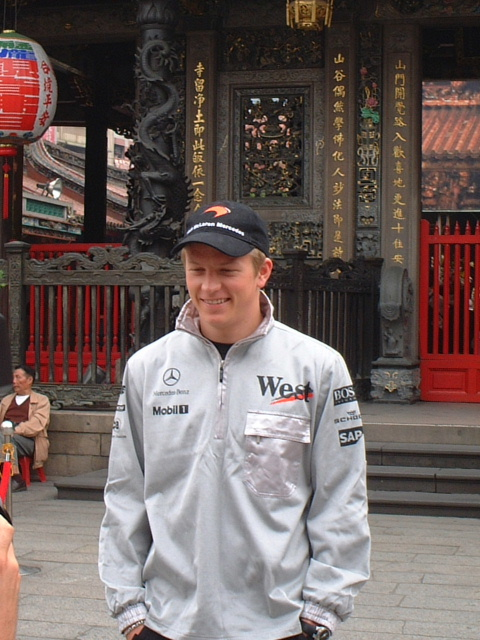
Kimi Räikkönen (pictured in 2002) achieved the first victory of his Formula One career.

Michael Schumacher overtook Trulli at turn one on lap 41 and passed Button for fifth place braking for the final turn on lap 42, as Button's tyres were losing grip quickly. Pizzonia's brakes failed and retired after spinning into the turn 15 gravel trap on lap 45. Wilson retired in the garage on the following lap because the car lacked power steering and the straps on his HANS device had become loose and pinched his shoulders, causing temporary paralysis in both arms. It took Minardi eight minutes to ease Wilson out of the car before he was taken to hospital. He recovered before the next race. McLaren instructed Räikkönen to slow to conserve his car and not be risky with nine laps remaining. On lap 51, Trulli spun at the final corner while attempting to pass Button, whose tyres were blistering heavily and causing chronic oversteer. He remained on the circuit but had to aggressively hold off Michael Schumacher into the first turn. On the final lap, Button spun at the final corner due to worn tyres, allowing Trulli and Michael Schumacher to demote him to seventh.

At the front, Räikkönen held the lead since Barrichello's first pit stop on lap 22 to win his first Formula One race in his 36th Grand Prix. Barrichello finished second, 39.286 seconds behind. Alonso took third for his maiden podium finish. He became the first Spanish driver to finish on the podium since Alfonso de Portago shared second at the 1956 British Grand Prix; he asked for a doctor on the slowing down lap, worried he might be ill. Having started 17th, Ralf Schumacher pushed hard throughout the race, finishing fourth, the last driver on the lead lap. Trulli finished fifth, followed by Michael Schumacher in sixth and Button in seventh; Button registered BAR's first points score of the season. Heidfeld was the last of the points-scorers in eighth. Frentzen stalled on the starting grid because he could not select first gear but was ninth. Firman took tenth after Frentzen passed him on the final lap due to him running economically because not enough fuel was put into his car at a pit stop and he ran out of fuel after finishing the race. Da Matta was on a one-stop strategy, however a fuel pressure issue forced him to drive with a full fuel tank for the duration of the race and make three pit stops, finishing 11th. Montoya's one-stop strategy following his first lap contact with Pizzonia put him in 12th, and his water bottle failed after 12 laps. Verstappen was the final classified finisher, four laps behind, having spent most of the race at the back of the pack. 13 drivers finished the race but two were treated for dehydration in the hot weather.

=== Post-race ===
The top three drivers appeared on the podium to collect their trophies and spoke to the media in the subsequent press conference. Räikkönen said he was not expecting to win the Grand Prix "but nevertheless it was very nice to win it", adding he felt lucky to win and he had not had his focus on how many races other drivers had entered before winning. Now he had won a Grand Prix, there was less pressure from others asking when his first win would come. Barrichello said he lost a large amount of time because of the first lap collisions, "It was just that we fell back during the first lap so I had to catch up. When you follow another car, you lose quite a bit of time. But I had a trouble free race." Alonso lauded Renault's tactics and thanked the team because the entire race weekend was "fantastic" for him and possibly the finest in his career, adding, "It was an amazing feeling for me to be leading 14 laps, keeping the gap to Kimi more or less constant. It was really a good fight and a very special feeling."

The Finnish press praised Räikkönen's maiden victory. Daily newspaper Helsingin Sanomat wrote that the victory resulted in "much-needed" excitement in Formula One being injected into the series while the tabloid Iltalehti said Räikkönen's win "could have a spectacular impact." Rival tabloid Ilta-Sanomat questioned whether there had been a power shift in Formula One following Michael Schumacher's defeat by Räikkönen in two consecutive Grands Prix. McLaren CEO Ron Dennis was emotional over the achievement, "He was cool and calm after the race and that's a pleasure to see because he's able to focus in a pressured situation." Dennis added that Räikkönen's success would help him a lot from feeling a great sense of relief from his achievement. The team's managing director Martin Whitmarsh predicted that Räikkönen would win more races during the season.

Coulthard heavily criticised McLaren for the car's unreliability, "These are the sort of situations [we have to capitalise on], especially with a year-old car. We should have reliability and we still can't get the car to the finish." Michael Schumacher admitted he was at fault for the first lap collision with Trulli and apologised to the latter. Two Italian newspapers chastised the Ferrari driver for the collision, one calling him a "buffoon" and the other accusing him of betraying Ferrari. Renault team principal Flavio Briatore argued that Michael Schumacher should have learnt to drive by this stage of his career. Coulthard said of the accident, "You just know Michael will try to intimidate people to move over. I was turning wide because I could see that Michael was going to have a go with his usual bullying tactics. It didn't come off at all and it cost him badly." BMW Motorsport director Mario Theissen remarked on Ralf Schumacher finishing fourth after starting in 17th, "You don't often see a driver achieving fourth place having started 17th!" Button described the Grand Prix as "the worst race of my entire life!" because he was shaking after his drinks bottle failed early in the race and could not be used for 40 laps, "It was very tough."

As a result, Räikkönen took the World Drivers' Championship lead from his teammate Coulthard, with 16 championship points. Coulthard's failure to score dropped him to second with ten championship points, while Montoya's 12th place result dropped him to third with eight. Barrichello was fourth with eight championship points, the same number as Alonso in fifth. McLaren extended their World Constructors' Championship lead to 36 points, ten more than second-place Ferrari. Renault remained third with 16 championship points and Williams dropped from second to fourth with 14 races remaining in the season.

=== Race classification ===
Drivers who scored championship points are denoted in bold.

Pos	No	Driver	Constructor	Tyre	Laps	Time/Retired	Grid	Points
1	6	(Finland) **Kimi Räikkönen**	**McLaren-Mercedes**	M	56	1:32:22.195	7	10
2	2	(Brazil) **Rubens Barrichello**	**Ferrari**	B	56	+39.286	5	8
3	8	(Spain) **Fernando Alonso**	**Renault**	M	56	+1:04.007	1	6
4	4	(Germany) **Ralf Schumacher**	**Williams-BMW**	M	56	+1:28.026	17	5
5	7	(Italy) **Jarno Trulli**	**Renault**	M	55	+1 Lap	2	4
6	1	(Germany) **Michael Schumacher**	**Ferrari**	B	55	+1 Lap	3	3
7	17	(United Kingdom) **Jenson Button**	**BAR-Honda**	B	55	+1 Lap	9	2
8	9	(Germany) **Nick Heidfeld**	**Sauber-Petronas**	B	55	+1 Lap	6	1
9	10	(Germany) Heinz-Harald Frentzen	Sauber-Petronas	B	55	+1 Lap	13	
10	12	(Republic of Ireland) Ralph Firman	Jordan-Ford	B	55	+1 Lap	20	
11	21	(Brazil) Cristiano da Matta	Toyota	M	55	+1 Lap	PL^{2}	
12	3	(Colombia) Juan Pablo Montoya	Williams-BMW	M	53	+3 Laps	8	
13	19	(Netherlands) Jos Verstappen	Minardi-Cosworth	B	52	+4 Laps	18	
Ret	15	(Brazil) Antônio Pizzonia	Jaguar-Cosworth	M	42	Brakes/Spun off	15	
Ret	18	(United Kingdom) Justin Wilson	Minardi-Cosworth	B	41	Fatigue	19	
Ret	14	(Australia) Mark Webber	Jaguar-Cosworth	M	35	Engine	16	
Ret	20	(France) Olivier Panis	Toyota	M	12	Fuel pressure	10	
Ret	5	(United Kingdom) David Coulthard	McLaren-Mercedes	M	2	Electrical	4	
Ret	11	(Italy) Giancarlo Fisichella	Jordan-Ford	B	0	Launch control	14	
DNS	16	(Canada) Jacques Villeneuve	BAR-Honda	B	0	Electrical	12	

Notes

- **^2** - Cristiano da Matta started the race from the pit lane.

== Championship standings after the race ==
Drivers' Championship standings

+/–	Pos	Driver	Points
2	1	(Finland) Kimi Räikkönen	16
1	2	(United Kingdom) David Coulthard	10
1	3	(Colombia) Juan Pablo Montoya	8
10	4	(Brazil) Rubens Barrichello	8
2	5	(Spain) Fernando Alonso	8

Constructors' Championship standings

+/–	Pos	Constructor	Points
	1	(United Kingdom) McLaren-Mercedes	26
2	2	(Italy) Ferrari	16
	3	(France) Renault	16
2	4	(United Kingdom) Williams-BMW	14
	5	(Switzerland) Sauber-Petronas	4
Sources:

- Note: Only the top five positions are included for both sets of standings.

== Notes ==
Previous race: 2003 Australian Grand Prix	FIA Formula One World Championship; 2003 season	Next race: 2003 Brazilian Grand Prix
Previous race: 2002 Malaysian Grand Prix	Malaysian Grand Prix	Next race: 2004 Malaysian Grand Prix
