= Bari Grand Prix =

Coordinates: 41°7′51″N 16°50′56″E

- Bari Street Circuit
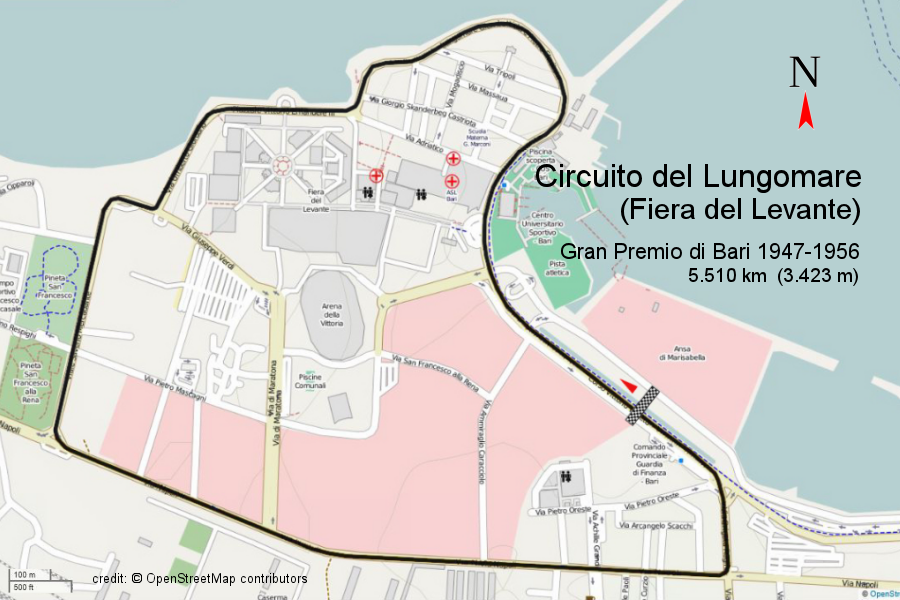

Race information
- Number of times held: 9
- First held: 1947
- Last held: 1956
- Most wins (drivers): (Brazil) Chico Landi (2)
- Most wins (constructors): (Italy) Ferrari (4)
- Circuit length: 5.5 km (3.4 miles)
- Race length: 200 km (125 miles)
- Laps: 36

Last race (1956)

Pole position

Podium
- 1. (United Kingdom) Stirling Moss; Maserati; 1:30:52.4; 2. (France) Jean Behra; Maserati; +2m 9.8s; 3. (Italy) Cesare Perdisa; Maserati; +2m 13.8s

Fastest lap

The Bari Grand Prix was a Grand Prix road race, held in Bari, Italy, between 1947 and 1956. The course was 3.449 miles (6 km) and, except for 1956, was run in an anticlockwise direction. In 1953 the race was not contested.

== Winners ==
Year	Winner	Car	Class	Report
1947	(Italy) Achille Varzi	Alfa Romeo 158	Grand Prix	Report
1948	(Brazil) Chico Landi	Ferrari 166	Formula Two	Report
1949	(Italy) Alberto Ascari	Ferrari 166	Formula Two	Report
1950	(Italy) Nino Farina	Alfa Romeo 158	Formula One	Report
1951	(Argentina) Juan Manuel Fangio	Alfa Romeo 159	Formula One	Report
1952	(Brazil) Chico Landi	Ferrari 225S	Sports car	Report
1953	Not held			
1954	(Argentina) José Froilán González	Ferrari 625	Formula One	Report
1955	(Italy) Cesare Perdisa	Maserati A6GCS	Sports car	Report
1956	(United Kingdom) Stirling Moss	Maserati 300S	Sports car	Report

== Bari Grand Prix circuits 1947–2011 ==
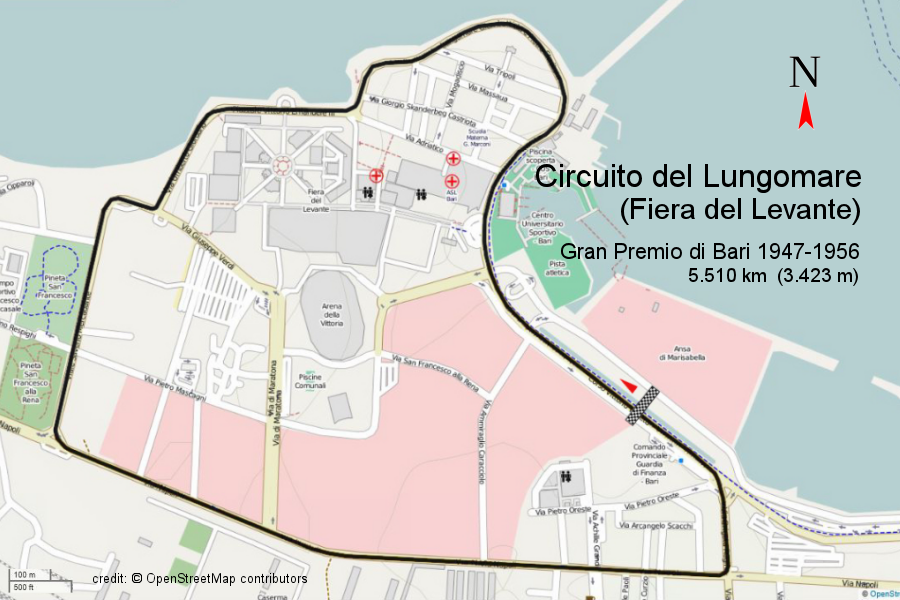
Street Map – Lungomare Circuit (1947–1955(

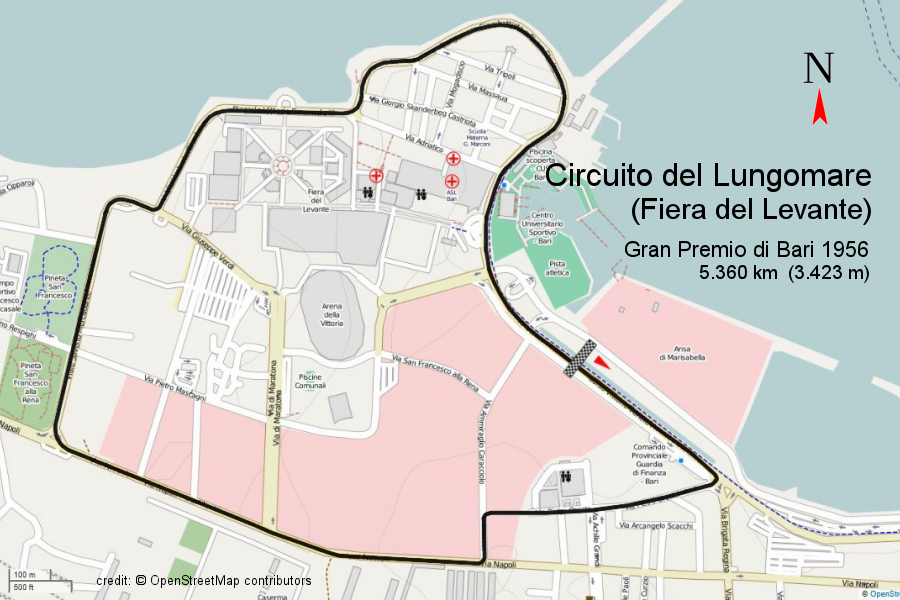
Street Map – Lungomare Circuit 1956

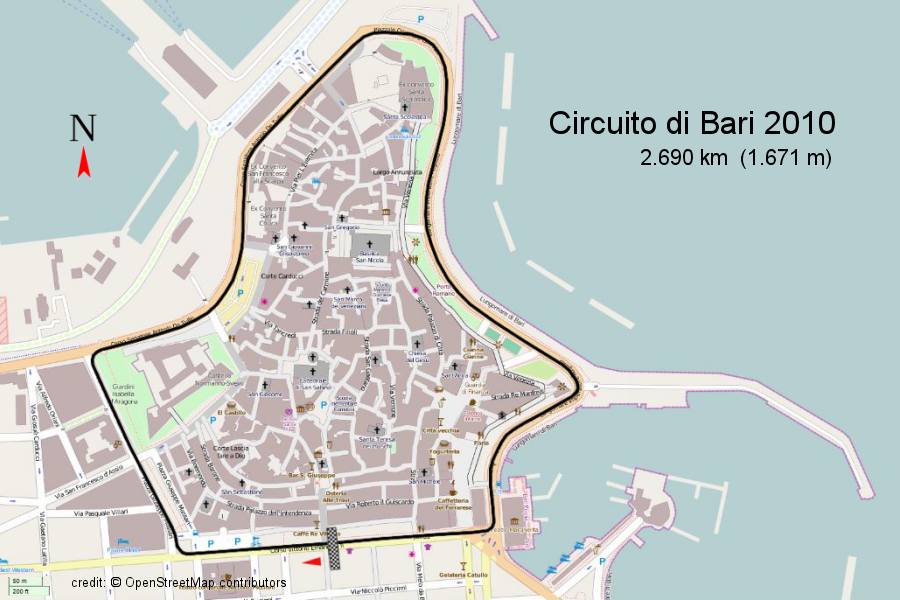
Street Map – Bari Circuit 2010

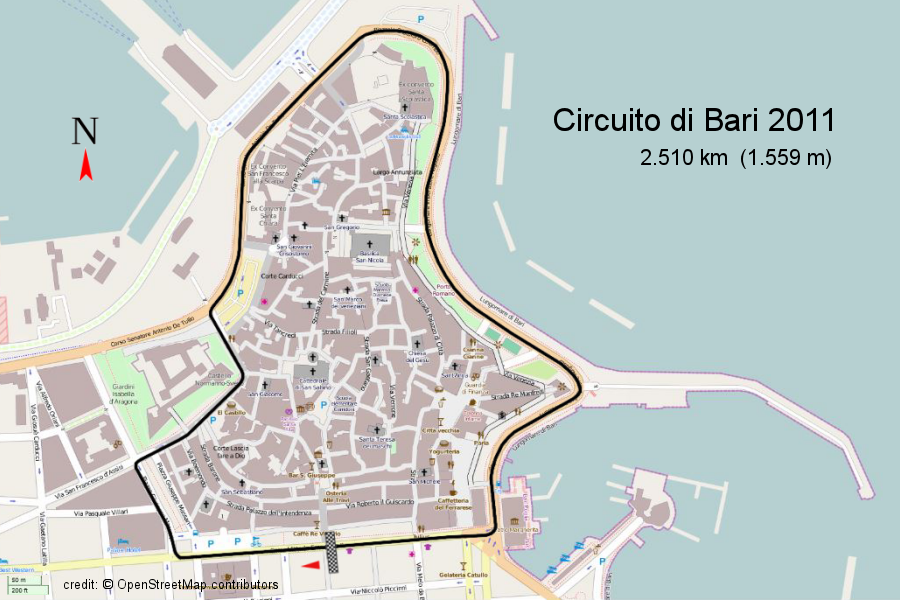
Street Map – Bari Circuit 2011

== Bibliography ==
- Acerbi, Leonardo (2006). Ferrari: A Complete Guide to All Models. St. Paul: Motorbooks.
- (1951). "Bari Race to Fangio." The New York Times. September 3.
- (1956). "Moss Wins Bari Race." The New York Times. July 23.
- Complete Bari Grand Prix results.
- 1956 Bari Grand Prix results.
