= 1951 Spanish Grand Prix =

← Previous race	Next race →
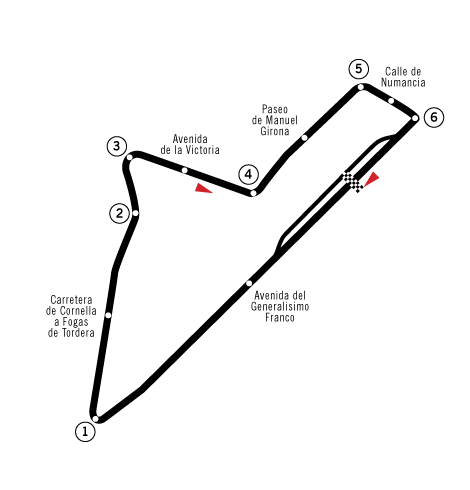
- Pedralbes street circuit

Race details
- Date: 28 October 1951
- Official name: XI Gran Premio de España
- Location: Pedralbes Circuit, Barcelona, Catalonia
- Course: Street circuit
- Course length: 6.316 km (3.925 miles)
- Distance: 70 laps, 442.120 km (274.721 miles)
- Weather: Hot, Dry

Pole position
Driver	(Italy) Alberto Ascari	Scuderia Ferrari
- Time: 2:10.59

Fastest lap
Driver	(Argentina) Juan Manuel Fangio	Alfa Romeo
- Time: 2:16.93

Podium
First	(Argentina) Juan Manuel Fangio	Alfa Romeo
Second	(Argentina) José Froilán González	Scuderia Ferrari
Third	(Italy) Nino Farina	Alfa Romeo

The 1951 Spanish Grand Prix was a Formula One motor race held on 28 October 1951 at Pedralbes Circuit. It was the eighth and final race of the 1951 World Championship of Drivers.

This race was determined by tyre choice – Ferrari chose a 16-inch rear wheel, whilst Alfa Romeo settled for the 18 inch, which proved to be the better of the two options. Juan Manuel Fangio led Alberto Ascari by two points before the race. Ascari led the race from José Froilán González, but the Ferraris suffered numerous tread problems. Piero Taruffi threw a tyre tread on lap 6 and was followed on lap 7 by Luigi Villoresi, Ascari on lap 8 and Gonzalez on lap 14. The Ferraris were forced to stop frequently to change tyres and Fangio comfortably won the race and his first drivers' title, after Ascari finished 4th was not able to overhaul Fangio's total. After the race, Alfa Romeo announced that due to lack of finances, they would not be competing in the 1952 season.

== Entries ==
No	Driver	Entrant	Constructor	Chassis	Engine	Tyre
2	(Italy) Alberto Ascari	Scuderia Ferrari	Ferrari	Ferrari 375	Ferrari Type 375 4.5 V12	P
4	(Italy) Luigi Villoresi	Scuderia Ferrari	Ferrari	Ferrari 375	Ferrari Type 375 4.5 V12	P
6	(Argentina) José Froilán González	Scuderia Ferrari	Ferrari	Ferrari 375	Ferrari Type 375 4.5 V12	P
8	(Italy) Piero Taruffi	Scuderia Ferrari	Ferrari	Ferrari 375	Ferrari Type 375 4.5 V12	P
10	(United Kingdom) Peter Whitehead^{1}	Peter Whitehead	Ferrari	Ferrari 375	Ferrari 375 F1 4.5 V12	P
12	(France) Maurice Trintignant	Equipe Gordini	Simca-Gordini	Simca-Gordini T15	Simca-Gordini 15C 1.5 L4s	E
14	(France) Robert Manzon	Equipe Gordini	Simca-Gordini	Simca-Gordini T15	Simca-Gordini 15C 1.5 L4s	E
16	(France) André Simon	Equipe Gordini	Simca-Gordini	Simca-Gordini T15	Simca-Gordini 15C 1.5 L4s	E
18	(Thailand) Prince Bira	Prince Bira	Maserati-OSCA	Maserati 4CLT-48	OSCA V12	P
20	(Italy) Nino Farina	Alfa Romeo SpA	Alfa Romeo	Alfa Romeo 159M	Alfa Romeo 1.5 L8s	P
22	(Argentina) Juan Manuel Fangio	Alfa Romeo SpA	Alfa Romeo	Alfa Romeo 159M	Alfa Romeo 1.5 L8s	P
24	(Italy) Felice Bonetto	Alfa Romeo SpA	Alfa Romeo	Alfa Romeo 159M	Alfa Romeo 1.5 L8s	P
26	(Switzerland) Toulo de Graffenried	Alfa Romeo SpA	Alfa Romeo	Alfa Romeo 159M	Alfa Romeo 1.5 L8s	P
28	(France) Louis Rosier	Ecurie Rosier	Talbot-Lago	Talbot-Lago T26C-DA	Talbot 23CV 4.5 L6	D
30	(Monaco) Louis Chiron	Ecurie Rosier	Talbot-Lago	Talbot-Lago T26C	Talbot 23CV 4.5 L6	D
32	(France) Yves Giraud-Cabantous	Yves Giraud-Cabantous	Talbot-Lago	Talbot-Lago T26C	Talbot 23CV 4.5 L6	D
34	(France) Philippe Étancelin	Philippe Étancelin	Talbot-Lago	Talbot-Lago T26C-DA	Talbot 23CV 4.5 L6	D
36	(Belgium) Johnny Claes	Ecurie Belge	Talbot-Lago	Talbot-Lago T26C-DA	Talbot 23CV 4.5 L6	D
38	(France) Georges Grignard	Georges Grignard	Talbot-Lago	Talbot-Lago T26C-DA	Talbot 23CV 4.5 L6	D
40	(United Kingdom) Reg Parnell^{1}	BRM Ltd.	BRM	BRM P15	BRM 15 1.5 V16s	D
44	(Spain) Paco Godia	Scuderia Milano	Maserati	Maserati 4CLT-48	Maserati 4 CL 1.5 L4s	P
46	(Spain) Juan Jover^{2}	Scuderia Milano	Maserati	Maserati 4CLT-48	Maserati 4 CL 1.5 L4s	P
48	(Switzerland) Toni Branca^{3}	Antonio Branca	Maserati	Maserati 4CLT-48	Maserati 4 CL 1.5 L4s	P

^1 — Peter Whitehead and Reg Parnell both withdrew from the event prior to practice.
^2 — Juan Jover qualified in the #46 Maserati, although he did not start the race. Joaquin Palacio had been entered in car #46, but he withdrew prior to practice.
^3 — Toni Branca withdrew from the event prior to practice. Chico Landi had also been entered in car #48, but he too withdrew from the Grand Prix before practice.

== Championship permutations ==
Three drivers were fighting for the championship going into the race: Fangio on 27 points, Ascari on 25 points and González on 21 points. Championship leader Fangio only needed a second place in order to win his maiden drivers' title.

The championship would have been won by either of the top three drivers in the following manner:

	Fangio would have won if:		
	(Argentina) Juan Manuel Fangio	(Italy) Alberto Ascari	(Argentina) José Froilán González
Pos.	2nd or better	Any position	Any position
Pos.	3rd	3rd or lower	Any position
Pos.	4th	3rd or lower	Any position
Pos.	5th	4th or lower	Any position
Pos.	lower than 5th + FL	4th or lower	Any position
Pos.	lower than 5th w/o FL	4th or lower	2nd or lower + FL

	Ascari would have won if:		
	(Italy) Alberto Ascari	(Argentina) Juan Manuel Fangio	(Argentina) José Froilán González
Pos.	1st	Any position	Any position
Pos.	2nd	3rd or lower	Any position

	González would have won if:		
	(Argentina) José Froilán González	(Argentina) Juan Manuel Fangio	(Italy) Alberto Ascari
Pos.	1st + FL	lower than 5th w/o FL	3rd or lower

== Classification ==
=== Qualifying ===
Pos	No	Driver	Constructor	Time	Gap
1	2	(Italy) Alberto Ascari	Ferrari	2:10.59	–
2	22	(Argentina) Juan Manuel Fangio	Alfa Romeo	2:12.27	+ 1.68
3	6	(Argentina) José Froilán González	Ferrari	2:14.01	+ 3.42
4	20	(Italy) Nino Farina	Alfa Romeo	2:14.94	+ 4.35
5	4	(Italy) Luigi Villoresi	Ferrari	2:16.38	+ 5.79
6	26	(Switzerland) Toulo de Graffenried	Alfa Romeo	2:16.40	+ 5.81
7	8	(Italy) Piero Taruffi	Ferrari	2:16.80	+ 6.21
8	24	(Italy) Felice Bonetto	Alfa Romeo	2:21.80	+ 11.21
9	14	(France) Robert Manzon	Simca-Gordini	2:23.81	+ 13.22
10	16	(France) André Simon	Simca-Gordini	2:24.60	+ 14.01
11	12	(France) Maurice Trintignant	Simca-Gordini	2:25.25	+ 14.66
12	30	(Monaco) Louis Chiron	Talbot-Lago-Talbot	2:30.32	+ 19.73
13	34	(France) Philippe Étancelin	Talbot-Lago-Talbot	2:31.00	+ 20.41
14	32	(France) Yves Giraud-Cabantous	Talbot-Lago-Talbot	2:32.18	+ 21.59
15	36	(Belgium) Johnny Claes	Talbot-Lago-Talbot	2:34.46	+ 23.87
16	38	(France) Georges Grignard	Talbot-Lago-Talbot	2:35.58	+ 24.99
17	44	(Spain) Paco Godia	Maserati	2:37.45	+ 26.86
18	46	(Spain) Juan Jover	Maserati	2:41.99	+ 31.40
19	18	(Thailand) Prince Bira	Maserati-OSCA	2:45.99	+ 35.40
20	28	(France) Louis Rosier	Talbot-Lago-Talbot	2:46.78	+ 36.19

=== Race ===
Pos	No	Driver	Constructor	Laps	Time/retired	Grid	Points
1	22	(Argentina) Juan Manuel Fangio	Alfa Romeo	70	2:46:54.10	2	9^{1}
2	6	(Argentina) José Froilán González	Ferrari	70	+54.28	3	6
3	20	(Italy) Nino Farina	Alfa Romeo	70	+1:45.54	4	4
4	2	(Italy) Alberto Ascari	Ferrari	68	+2 laps	1	3
5	24	(Italy) Felice Bonetto	Alfa Romeo	68	+2 laps	8	2
6	26	(Switzerland) Toulo de Graffenried	Alfa Romeo	66	+4 laps	6	
7	28	(France) Louis Rosier	Talbot-Lago-Talbot	64	+6 laps	20	
8	34	(France) Philippe Étancelin	Talbot-Lago-Talbot	63	+7 laps	13	
9	14	(France) Robert Manzon	Simca-Gordini	63	+7 laps	9	
10	44	(Spain) Paco Godia	Maserati	60	+10 laps	17	
Ret	4	(Italy) Luigi Villoresi	Ferrari	48	Ignition	5	
Ret	16	(France) André Simon	Simca-Gordini	48	Engine	10	
Ret	36	(Belgium) Johnny Claes	Talbot-Lago-Talbot	37	Accident	15	
Ret	8	(Italy) Piero Taruffi	Ferrari	30	Wheel	7	
Ret	12	(France) Maurice Trintignant	Simca-Gordini	25	Engine	11	
Ret	38	(France) Georges Grignard	Talbot-Lago-Talbot	23	Engine	16	
Ret	32	(France) Yves Giraud-Cabantous	Talbot-Lago-Talbot	7	Accident	14	
Ret	30	(Monaco) Louis Chiron	Talbot-Lago-Talbot	4	Ignition	12	
Ret	18	(Thailand) Prince Bira	Maserati-OSCA	1	Engine	19	
DNS	46	(Spain) Juan Jover	Maserati	0	Engine	18	

Notes

- ^1 – Includes 1 point for fastest lap

== Final Championship standings ==
- **Bold text** indicates the World Champion.

Drivers' Championship standings

Pos	Driver	Points
1	(Argentina) **Juan Manuel Fangio**	31 (37)
2	(Italy) Alberto Ascari	25 (28)
3	(Argentina) José Froilán González	24 (27)
4	(Italy) Nino Farina	19 (22)
5	(Italy) Luigi Villoresi	15 (18)

- Note: Only the top five positions are included. Only the best 4 results counted towards the Championship. Numbers without parentheses are Championship points; numbers in parentheses are total points scored.

Previous race: 1951 Italian Grand Prix	FIA Formula One World Championship; 1951 season	Next race: 1952 Swiss Grand Prix
Previous race: 1935 Spanish Grand Prix	Spanish Grand Prix	Next race: 1954 Spanish Grand Prix
