= Juan Jover =

Spanish racing driver (1903–1960)

- Born: 23 November 1903; Barcelona, Catalonia, Spain
- Died: 28 June 1960 (aged 56) near Sitges, Catalonia, Spain

Formula One World Championship career
- Nationality: Spanish
- Active years: 1951
- Team: non-works Maserati
- Entries: 1 (0 starts)
- Championships: 0
- Wins: 0
- Podiums: 0
- Career points: 0
- Pole positions: 0
- Fastest laps: 0
- First entry: 1951 Spanish Grand Prix

Juan Jover Sañes (23 November 1903 – 28 June 1960) was a Spanish racing driver, born in Barcelona. With Paco Godia, Jover was the first Spanish driver to compete in Formula One.

Jover raced for Scuderia Milano-Maserati in the 1947 Bari Grand Prix, where he finished sixth, and in the 1948 Albi Grand Prix, where he came seventh. He then finished second in the 1949 24 Hours of Le Mans with Henri Louveau.

In 1951, Jover participated in the Formula One 1951 Spanish Grand Prix, qualifying 18th, but he did not start the race after blowing his engine.

Jover then switched to hillclimbing, and also endurance racing with Scuderia Pegaso. He suffered serious injuries to his left leg when he crashed his Pegaso Z-102 during trials for the 1953 24 Hours of Le Mans, but returned to hillclimbing in June 1954. In 1957, he won the Gran Premio de Barajas in a Maserati 200S, and the following year he won the La Rabassada hillclimb, driving a Mercedes-Benz 300SL.

Jover died in a road accident in 1960, when his convertible left the road and fell off a cliff near Sitges in Catalonia.

== Complete Formula One results ==
(key)

Year	Entrant	Chassis	Engine	1	2	3	4	5	6	7	8	WDC	Points
1951	Scuderia Milano	Maserati 4CLT/48	Maserati Straight-4	SUI	500	BEL	FRA	GBR	GER	ITA	ESP; DNS	NC	0
