= Paco Godia =

Spanish racing driver (1921–1990)

- Born: Francisco Godia Sales; 21 March 1921; Barcelona, Spain
- Died: 28 November 1990 (aged 69); Barcelona, Spain

Formula One World Championship career
- Nationality: (Spain) Spanish
- Active years: 1951, 1954, 1956–1958
- Team: Maserati including non-works
- Entries: 14 (13 starts)
- Championships: 0
- Wins: 0
- Podiums: 0
- Career points: 6
- Pole positions: 0
- Fastest laps: 0
- First entry: 1951 Spanish Grand Prix
- Last entry: 1958 French Grand Prix

Francisco "Paco" Godia Sales (21 March 1921 – 28 November 1990) was a Spanish racing driver. He drove intermittently in Formula One between 1951 and 1958, participating in 14 World Championship Grands Prix and numerous non-Championship races. He was the first Spaniard ever to take part in a Formula One Grand Prix.

== Complete Formula One World Championship results ==
(key)

Year	Entrant	Chassis	Engine	1	2	3	4	5	6	7	8	9	10	11	WDC	Points
1951	Scuderia Milano	Maserati 4CLT/48	Maserati Straight-4	SUI	500	BEL	FRA	GBR	GER	ITA	ESP; 10				NC	0
1954	Officine Alfieri Maserati	Maserati 250F	Maserati Straight-6	ARG	500	BEL	FRA	GBR	GER	SUI	ITA	ESP; 6			NC	0
1956	Officine Alfieri Maserati	Maserati 250F	Maserati Straight-6	ARG	MON	500	BEL; Ret	FRA; 7	GBR; 8	GER; 4	ITA; 4				9th	6
1957	Francesco Godia Sales	Maserati 250F	Maserati Straight-6	ARG	MON	500	FRA	GBR	GER; Ret	PES; Ret	ITA; 9				NC	0
1958	Francesco Godia Sales	Maserati 250F	Maserati Straight-6	ARG; 8	MON; DNQ	NED	500	BEL; Ret	FRA; Ret	GBR	GER	POR	ITA	MOR	NC	0

== Complete European Formula Two Championship results ==
(key)

Year	Entrant	Chassis	Engine	1	2	3	4	5	6	7	8	9	10	Pos.	Points
1967	Frank Manning Racing	Lola T64	Lotus Straight-4	SNE	SIL	NÜR	HOC	TUL	JAR; DNS	ZAN	PER	BRH	VAL	NC	0

== Sources ==
- Formula One World Championship results are derived from "The Official Formula 1 website". Archived from the original on 2015-02-19.
