= 1955 International Gold Cup =

- Non-championship race in the 1955 Formula One season

Race details
- Date: 24 September 1955
- Official name: II International Gold Cup
- Location: Oulton Park Circuit, Cheshire
- Course: Permanent racing facility
- Course length: 4.44 km (2.76 miles)
- Distance: 54 laps, 239.14 km (149.09 miles)

Pole position
Driver	(United Kingdom) Mike Hawthorn	Ferrari
- Time: 1:52.4

Fastest lap
Driver	(United Kingdom) Stirling Moss	Maserati
- Time: 1:53.2

Podium
First	(United Kingdom) Stirling Moss	Maserati
Second	(United Kingdom) Mike Hawthorn	Ferrari
Third	(United Kingdom) Desmond Titterington	Vanwall

The 2nd International Gold Cup was a motor race, run to Formula One rules, held on 24 September 1955 at the Oulton Park Circuit, Cheshire. The race was run over 54 laps of the circuit, and was won by British driver Stirling Moss in a Maserati 250F.

== Results ==
Pos	No.	Driver	Entrant	Constructor	Time/Retired	Grid
1	4	(United Kingdom) Stirling Moss	Officine Alfieri Maserati	Maserati 250F	1h44m05.4, 85.94 mph	2
2	1	(United Kingdom) Mike Hawthorn	Scuderia Ferrari	Lancia D50	1h45m11.6, +66.2s	1
3	9	(United Kingdom) Desmond Titterington	Vandervell Products Ltd.	Vanwall VW3	53 laps	6
4	11	(United Kingdom) Reg Parnell	Connaught Engineering	Connaught Type B-Alta	53 laps	9
5	16	(United Kingdom) Roy Salvadori	Gilby Engineering Ltd.	Maserati 250F	52 laps	7
6	18	(United Kingdom) Bob Gerard	F.R. Gerard	Cooper T23-Bristol	52 laps	10
7	2	(Italy) Eugenio Castellotti	Scuderia Ferrari	Lancia D50	51 laps	4
8	5	(Italy) Luigi Musso	Officine Alfieri Maserati	Maserati 250F	49 laps - gearbox	3
9	19	(United Kingdom) Michael Young	Roebuck Engineering	Connaught Type A-Alta	47 laps	18
10	15	(United Kingdom) Peter Walker	R.R.C. Walker Racing Team	Connaught Type A-Alta	45 laps - transmission	8
11	12	(United Kingdom) Jack Fairman	Connaught Engineering	Connaught Type B-Alta	44 laps	15
Ret	3	(Spain) Alfonso de Portago	Marquis de Portago	Ferrari 625	35 laps - spin	14
Ret	21	(United Kingdom) John Young	John Coombs	Connaught Type A-Lea Francis	24 laps - spin	17
Ret	7	(United States) Harry Schell	Vandervell Products Ltd.	Vanwall VW2	16 laps - universal joint	5
Ret	17	(United Kingdom) Leslie Marr	L. Marr	Connaught Type B-Alta	16 laps - crash	11
Ret	24	(United Kingdom) Bruce Halford	Equipe Devone	Cooper T23-Bristol	14 laps - engine	16
Ret	6	(United Kingdom) Horace Gould	Gould's Garage (Bristol)	Maserati 250F	9 laps - engine	12
Ret	10	(United Kingdom) Peter Collins	Owen Racing Organisation	BRM P25	9 laps - oil pressure	13
Ret	22	(United Kingdom) Dick Gibson	R. Gibson	Connaught Type A-Lea Francis	7 laps - engine	19
DNA	8	(United Kingdom) Ken Wharton	Vandervell Products Ltd.	Vanwall	driver injured	-
DNA	14	(Switzerland) Ottorino Volonterio	O. Volonterio	Maserati A6GCM		-
DNA	8	(United Kingdom) Charles Boulton	Ecurie Ane	Connaught Type A-Lea Francis		-

Previous race: 1955 Daily Telegraph Trophy	Formula One non-championship races 1955 season	Next race: 1955 Avon Trophy
Previous race: 1954 International Gold Cup	International Gold Cup	Next race: 1956 International Gold Cup
