= 1955 London Trophy =

- Non-championship race in the 1955 Formula One season
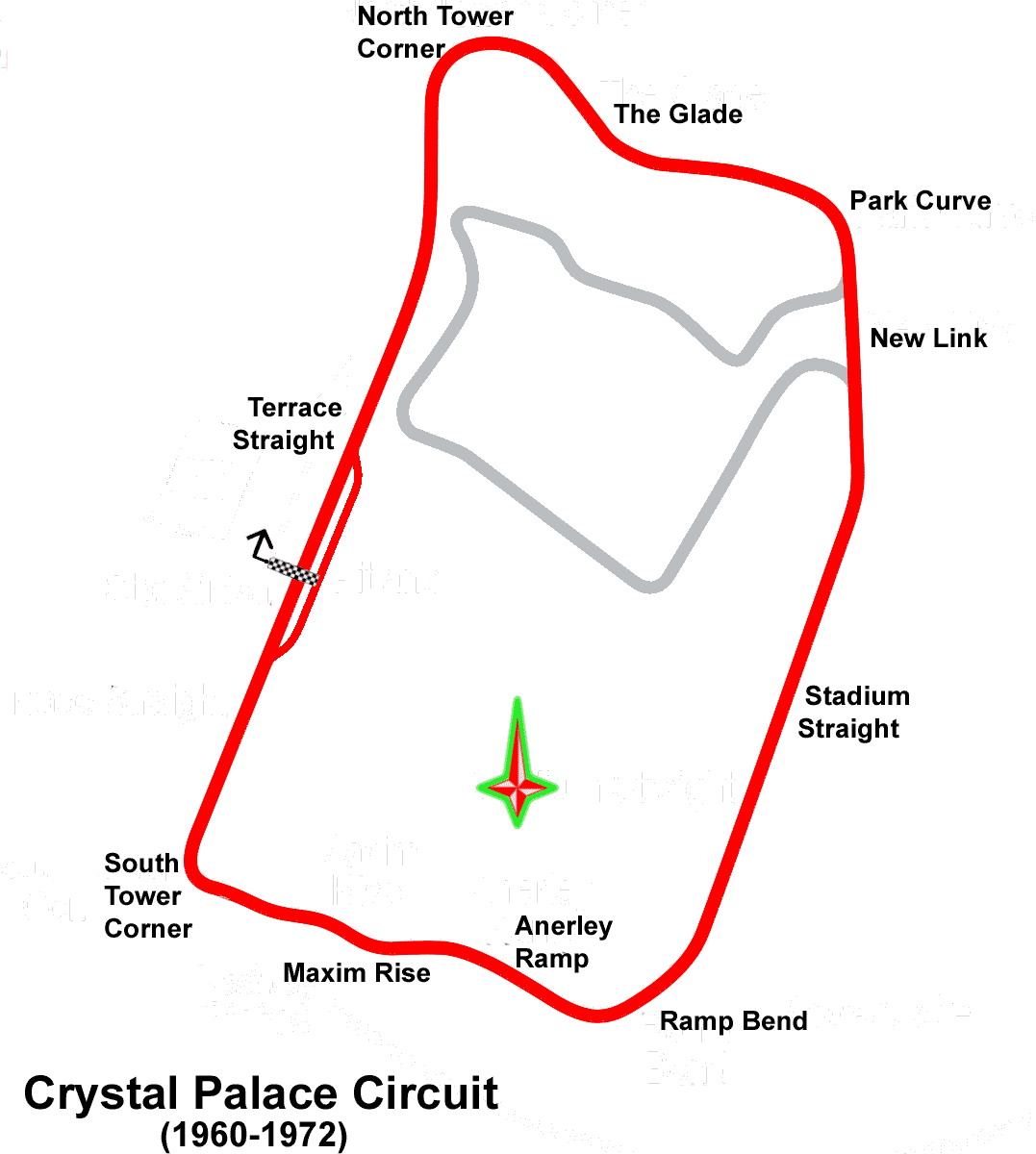

Race details
- Date: 30 July 1955
- Official name: III London Trophy
- Location: Crystal Palace Circuit, London
- Course: Permanent racing facility
- Course length: 2.240 km (1.390 miles)
- Distance: 15 (final) laps, 32.457 km (20.235 miles)

Pole position
| Driver | (United Kingdom) Mike Hawthorn | Maserati |

Fastest lap
| Driver | (United Kingdom) Mike Hawthorn | Maserati |
- Time: 1:03.4

Podium
| First | (United Kingdom) Mike Hawthorn | Maserati |
| Second | (United States) Harry Schell | Vanwall |
| Third | (United Kingdom) Roy Salvadori | Maserati |

The 3rd London Trophy (International Trophy) was a motor race, run to Formula One rules, held on 30 July 1955 at Crystal Palace Circuit, London. The race was run over two heats of 10 laps and a final of 15 laps, and was won by British driver Mike Hawthorn in a Maserati 250F. Hawthorn started from pole position in Heat 1 and set fastest lap in the heat, and also in the final. Vanwall driver Harry Schell started from pole position in Heat 2 and set fastest lap in that heat. Schell was second in the final and Roy Salvadori in a Maserati 250F was third.

== Entries ==
| No. | Driver | Entrant | Car |
|---|---|---|---|
| 1 | (United Kingdom) Jack Fairman | R.R.C. Walker Racing Team | Connaught Type B-Alta |
| 2 | (United States) Harry Schell | Vandervell Products Ltd. | Vanwall VW2 |
| 3 | (United Kingdom) Horace Gould | Gould's Garage (Bristol) | Maserati 250F |
| 5 | (United Kingdom) Tony Brooks | Equipe Endeavour | Connaught Type A-Lea Francis |
| 6 | (United Kingdom) Michael Young | Roebuck Engineering | Connaught Type A-Alta |
| 7 | (United Kingdom) Mike Hawthorn | Stirling Moss Ltd. | Maserati 250F |
| 8 | (United Kingdom) Charles Boulton | Ecurie Ane | Connaught Type A-Lea Francis |
| 9 | (United Kingdom) Roy Salvadori | Gilby Engineering | Maserati 250F |
| 10 | (United Kingdom) Bill Holt | E.W. Holt | Connaught Type A-Lea Francis |
| 11 | (United Kingdom) Tony Crook | T.A.D. Crook | Cooper T24-Bristol |
| 12 | (United Kingdom) John Young | J.A. Young | Connaught Type A-Lea Francis |
| 15 | (United Kingdom) Mike Keen | R.J. Chase | Cooper T23-Alta |
| 16 | (United Kingdom) Bob Gerard | F.R. Gerard | Cooper T23-Bristol |
| 17 | (United Kingdom) Paul Emery | Emeryson Cars | Emeryson Mk.1-Alta |
| 18 | (United Kingdom) Tom Kyffin | Equipe Devone | Cooper T23-Bristol |
| 19 | (United Kingdom) Alastair Birrell | A.W. Birrell | Cooper T20-Bristol |
| 20 | (Australia) Jack Brabham | Cooper Car Company | Cooper T40-Bristol |
| 21 | (United Kingdom) Keith Hall | Border Reivers | Cooper T20-Bristol |
| 23 | (United Kingdom) Bruce Halford | Equipe Devone | Cooper T23-Bristol |
| 24 | (United Kingdom) John Webb | J.H. Webb | Turner-Lea Francis |
| 4^{1} | (United Kingdom) Kenneth McAlpine | Connaught Engineering | Connaught Type B-Alta |
| 14^{1} | (United Kingdom) Dick Gibson | R. Gibson | Connaught Type A-Lea Francis |
| 22^{1} | (United Kingdom) David Hewitt | D.A. Hewitt | Cooper T23-Alta |

^{1}Numbers 4, 14 and 22 DNA

== Results ==
=== Heats ===
Heat 1

| Pos | Driver | Car | Time/Ret. |
|---|---|---|---|
| 1 | (United Kingdom) Mike Hawthorn | Maserati | 11:00.6, 75.75mph |
| 2 | (United Kingdom) Roy Salvadori | Maserati | +1.6s |
| 3 | (United Kingdom) Horace Gould | Maserati | +14.4s |
| 4 | (United Kingdom) Jack Fairman | Connaught-Alta | +17.8s |
| 5 | (United Kingdom) Tony Brooks | Connaught-Lea Francis | |
| 6 | (United Kingdom) Keith Hall | Cooper-Bristol | +1:12.0 |
| 7 | (United Kingdom) Mike Keen | Cooper-Alta | |
| Ret | (United Kingdom) Bruce Halford | Cooper-Bristol | 5 laps |
| Ret | (United Kingdom) Alastair Birrell | Cooper-Bristol | |
| Ret | (United Kingdom) Tony Crook | Cooper-Bristol | |

Heat 2

| Pos | Driver | Car | Time/Ret. |
|---|---|---|---|
| 1 | (United States) Harry Schell | Vanwall | 11:04.4, 75.33mph |
| 2 | (United Kingdom) Paul Emery | Emeryson-Alta | +5.4s |
| 3 | (Australia) Jack Brabham | Cooper-Alta | +54.2s |
| 4 | (United Kingdom) Michael Young | Connaught-Alta | +55.6s |
| 5 | (United Kingdom) Tom Kyffin | Cooper-Bristol | +56.2s |
| 6 | (United Kingdom) Bill Holt | Connaught-Lea Francis | +57.2s |
| 7 | (United Kingdom) John Webb | Turner-Lea Francis | +1 lap |
| Ret | (United Kingdom) John Young | Connaught-Lea Francis | 7 laps, valve |
| Ret | (United Kingdom) Charles Boulton | Connaught-Lea Francis | 1 lap, crash |
| Ret | (United Kingdom) Bob Gerard | Cooper-Bristol | 0 laps, half-shaft |

=== Final ===
Grid positions for the final were determined by the drivers' finishing times in the heats. Only the top six drivers from each heat qualified for the final.

| Pos. | Driver | Car | Time/Retired | Grid |
|---|---|---|---|---|
| 1 | (United Kingdom) Mike Hawthorn | Maserati | 16:10.0, 77.30mph | 1 |
| 2 | (United States) Harry Schell | Vanwall | +1.4s | 3 |
| 3 | (United Kingdom) Roy Salvadori | Maserati | +32.8s | 2 |
| 4 | (United Kingdom) Tony Brooks | Connaught-Lea Francis | +53.0s | 6 |
| 5 | (United Kingdom) Paul Emery | Emeryson-Alta | +1 lap | 7 |
| 6 | (United Kingdom) Michael Young | Connaught-Alta | +1 lap | 9 |
| 7 | (United Kingdom) Keith Hall | Cooper-Bristol | +1 lap | 12 |
| 8 | (United Kingdom) Bill Holt | Connaught-Lea Francis | | 11 |
| Ret | (United Kingdom) Horace Gould | Maserati | 10 laps, transmission | 4 |
| DNS | (Australia) Jack Brabham | Cooper-Bristol | | 8 |
| DNS | (United Kingdom) Jack Fairman | Connaught-Alta | | 5 |
| DNS | (United Kingdom) Tom Kyffin | Cooper-Bristol | | 10 |

| Previous race: 1955 Cornwall MRC Formula 1 Race | Formula One non-championship races 1955 season | Next race: 1955 Daily Record Trophy |
| Previous race: 1954 London Trophy | London Trophy | Next race: — |
