= 1955 Daily Telegraph Trophy =

- Non-championship race in the 1955 Formula One season

Race details
- Date: 3 September 1955
- Official name: II Daily Telegraph Trophy
- Location: Aintree Circuit, Merseyside
- Course: Permanent racing facility
- Course length: 4.81 km (3.00 miles)
- Distance: 17 laps, 81.80 km (51.00 miles)

Pole position
Driver	(United Kingdom) Stirling Moss	Maserati
- Time: 2:06.4

Fastest lap
Driver	(United Kingdom) Roy Salvadori	Maserati
- Time: 2:05.2

Podium
First	(United Kingdom) Roy Salvadori	Maserati
Second	(United Kingdom) Bob Gerard	Cooper-Bristol
Third	(United Kingdom) Horace Gould	Maserati

The 2nd Daily Telegraph Trophy was a motor race, run to Formula One rules, held on 3 September 1955 at Aintree Circuit, Merseyside. The race was run over 17 laps, and was won by British driver Roy Salvadori in a Maserati 250F. Salvadori also set fastest lap, and Stirling Moss was on pole position in a 250F but retired with engine problems. Bob Gerard was second in a Cooper T23-Bristol and Horace Gould third in another 250F.

This was the first race for the BRM P25. It only managed a few laps in practice before oil leaking onto the tyres caused driver Peter Collins to spin off and damage the car.

== Results ==
Pos.	No.	Driver	Entrant	Car	Time/Retired	Grid
1	5	(United Kingdom) Roy Salvadori	Gilby Engineering	Maserati 250F	36:33.0, 83.72mph	2
2	10	(United Kingdom) Bob Gerard	F.R. Gerard	Cooper T23-Bristol	+15.2s	4
3	4	(United Kingdom) Horace Gould	Gould's Garage (Bristol)	Maserati 250F	+25.6s	3
4	17	(United Kingdom) Tony Brooks	Equipe Endeavour	Connaught Type A-Lea Francis	+1:57.4	7
5	18	(United Kingdom) John Young	J.A. Young	Connaught Type A-Lea Francis	+2:14.6	12
6	2	(United Kingdom) Reg Parnell	Connaught Engineering	Connaught Type B-Alta	+1 lap	5
7	19	(United Kingdom) Bill Holt	E.W. Holt	Connaught Type A-Lea Francis	+1 lap	10
8	11	(United Kingdom) Bruce Halford	Equipe Devone	Cooper T23-Bristol	+1 lap	9
9	14	(United Kingdom) Alastair Birrell	A.W. Birrell	Cooper T20-Bristol	+1 lap	14
10	12	(United Kingdom) Tom Kyffin	Equipe Devone	Cooper T23-Bristol		19
Ret	7	(United Kingdom) Stirling Moss	Stirling Moss Ltd.	Maserati 250F	13 laps, engine	1
Ret	21	(United Kingdom) Horace Richards	H.A. Richards	H.A.R.-Riley	9 laps	17
Ret	6	(France) Louis Rosier	Ecurie Rosier	Maserati 250F	8 laps, clutch	6
Ret	8	(United Kingdom) Paul Emery	Emeryson Cars	Emeryson Mk.1-Alta	7 laps, oil pressure	15
Ret	20	(United Kingdom) Dick Gibson	R. Gibson	Connaught Type A-Lea Francis	3 laps, oil pressure	18
Ret	1	(United Kingdom) Jack Fairman	Connaught Engineering	Connaught Type B-Alta	2 laps, crash	8
Ret	15	(United Kingdom) Jimmy Somervail	Border Reivers	Cooper T20-Bristol	0 laps, crash	13
DNS	9	(United Kingdom) Peter Collins	Owen Racing Organisation	BRM P25	Crashed in practice	16
DNA	3	(United Kingdom) Michael Young	Roebuck Engineering	Connaught Type A-Alta		-
DNA	16	(United Kingdom) Charles Boulton	Ecurie Ane	Connaught Type A-Lea Francis		-

Previous race: 1955 RedeX Trophy	Formula One non-championship races 1955 season	Next race: 1955 International Gold Cup
Previous race: 1954 Daily Telegraph Trophy	Daily Telegraph Trophy	Next race: —
