= 1955 Avon Trophy =

- Non-championship race in the 1955 Formula One season

Race details
- Date: 1 October 1955
- Official name: I Avon Trophy
- Location: Castle Combe Circuit, Wilts.
- Course: Permanent racing facility
- Course length: 2.961 km (1.84 miles)
- Distance: 55 laps, 162.831 km (101.2 miles)

Pole position
Driver	(United States) Harry Schell	Vanwall
- Time: 1:14.4

Fastest lap
Driver	(United States) Harry Schell	Vanwall
- Time: 1:13.6

Podium
First	(United States) Harry Schell	Vanwall
Second	(United Kingdom) Horace Gould	Maserati
Third	(United Kingdom) Bob Gerard	Cooper-Bristol

The I Avon Trophy was a non-championship Grand Prix which was held at the Castle Combe Circuit on 1 October 1955, three weeks after the end of the season. It was the inaugural running of the Avon Trophy, and the last race run to Formula One regulations to be held at the circuit.

The race was won from pole by American, Harry Schell, ahead of privateer Horace Gould, in second and Bob Gerard in third.

== Background ==
The Castle Combe circuit, converted from an airfield just five years earlier, welcomed Formula One racing for the fourth consecutive year, having hosted the Joe Fry Memorial Trophy in previous years.

The inaugural Avon Trophy, although post-season and non-championship, was attended by numerous championship contenders from the 1955 season, as well as some new faces ahead of 1956. Among those who entered the race were American, Harry Schell, privateer Horace Gould and Frenchman, Louis Rosier. Peter Collins and future championship runner-up, Tony Brooks also attended.

== Classification ==
=== Qualifying ===
Pos	No.	Driver	Constructor	Time/Gap	Grid
1	26	(United States) Harry Schell	Vanwall	1m14.4	1
2	6	(United Kingdom) Horace Gould	Maserati	+0.6	2
3	12	(United Kingdom) Bob Gerard	Cooper-Bristol	+0.6	3
4	30	(United Kingdom) Tony Brooks	Connaught-Lea-Francis	+2.6	4
5	10	(United Kingdom) Roy Salvadori	Maserati	+2.8	5
6	4	(France) Louis Rosier	Maserati	+3.2	6
7	40	(United Kingdom) Graham Whitehead	Connaught-Lea-Francis	+3.2	7
8	2	(United Kingdom) Peter Walker	Connaught-Alta	+4.4	8
9	20	(United Kingdom) Paul Emery	Emeryson-Alta	+5.8	9
10	34	(United Kingdom) Tom Kyffin	Cooper-Bristol	+9.0	10
11	28	(United Kingdom) Alastair Birrell	Cooper-Bristol	+12.4	11
12	32	(United Kingdom) Dick Gibson	Connaught-Lea-Francis	+12.4	12
13	14	(United Kingdom) Peter Collins	Maserati	unknown	13
14	18	(United Kingdom) Michael Young	Connaught-Alta	unknown	14
DNA	8	(United Kingdom) Les Leston	Maserati		
DNA	16	(United Kingdom) Ron Flockhart	BRM		
DNA	22	(United Kingdom) Mike Hawthorn	Ferrari		
DNA	36	(United Kingdom) Bruce Halford	Cooper-Bristol		
DNA	38	(United Kingdom) John Young	Connaught-Lea-Francis		

=== Race ===
Pos	No.	Driver	Constructor	Laps	Time/Retired
1	26	(United States) Harry Schell	Vanwall	55	1:10:32.8
2	6	(United Kingdom) Horace Gould	Maserati	55	+20.0 s
3	12	(United Kingdom) Bob Gerard	Cooper-Bristol	55	+32.6 s
4	10	(United Kingdom) Roy Salvadori	Maserati	55	
5	30	(United Kingdom) Tony Brooks	Connaught-Lea-Francis	54	
6	40	(United Kingdom) Graham Whitehead	Connaught-Lea-Francis	54	
7	32	(United Kingdom) Dick Gibson	Connaught-Lea-Francis	53	
8	2	(United Kingdom) Peter Walker	Connaught-Alta		Gearbox
9	18	(United Kingdom) Michael Young	Connaught-Alta		
10	20	(United Kingdom) Paul Emery	Emeryson-Alta		
Ret	4	(France) Louis Rosier	Maserati	18	Broken shock absorber
Ret	14	(United Kingdom) Peter Collins	Maserati	9	De Dion tube
Ret	28	(United Kingdom) Alastair Birrell	Cooper-Bristol		
Ret	34	(United Kingdom) Tom Kyffin	Cooper-Bristol		

Previous race: 1955 International Gold Cup	Formula One non-championship races 1955 season	Next race: 1955 Syracuse Grand Prix
Previous race: —	Avon Trophy	Next race: —
