= 1955 RedeX Trophy =

- Non-championship race in the 1955 Formula One season

Race details
- Date: 13 August 1955
- Official name: III RedeX Trophy
- Location: Snetterton Circuit, Norfolk
- Course: Permanent racing facility
- Course length: 4.35 km (2.71 miles)
- Distance: 25 laps, 108.67 km (67.75 miles)

Pole position
Driver	(United Kingdom) Stirling Moss	Maserati

Fastest lap
Driver	(United Kingdom) Stirling Moss	Maserati
- Time: 1:56.0

Podium
First	(United States) Harry Schell	Vanwall
Second	(United Kingdom) Ken Wharton	Vanwall
Third	(United Kingdom) Stirling Moss	Maserati

The 3rd RedeX Trophy was a motor race, run to Formula One rules, held on 13 August 1955 at Snetterton Circuit, Norfolk. The race was run over 25 laps, and was won by American driver Harry Schell in a Vanwall. Maserati driver Stirling Moss was on pole position and set fastest lap.

This was the first Formula 1 win for the Vanwall marque.

== Results ==
Pos.	No.	Driver	Entrant	Car	Time/Retired	Grid
1	142	(United States) Harry Schell	Vandervell Products Ltd.	Vanwall VW2	50:07.4, 80.80 mph	2
2	149	(United Kingdom) Ken Wharton	Vandervell Products Ltd.	Vanwall VW3	+11.0s	4
3	125	(United Kingdom) Stirling Moss	Stirling Moss Ltd.	Maserati 250F	+18.6s	1
4	122	(Australia) Jack Brabham	J.A. Brabham	Cooper T40-Bristol	25 laps	11
5	127	(United Kingdom) Roy Salvadori	Gilby Engineering	Maserati 250F	25 laps	7
6	135	(United Kingdom) Jack Fairman	Connaught Engineering	Connaught Type B-Alta	25 laps	8
7	140	(France) Louis Rosier	Ecurie Rosier	Maserati 250F	25 laps	5
8	136	(United Kingdom) Mike Oliver	Connaught Engineering	Connaught Type B-Alta	25 laps	9
9	133	(United Kingdom) Michael Young	Roebuck Engineering	Connaught Type A-Alta		
10	139	(United Kingdom) Charles Boulton	Ecurie Ane	Connaught Type A-Lea Francis		
11	120	(Switzerland) Ottorino Volonterio	O. Volonterio	Maserati A6GCM		
Ret	126	(United Kingdom) Peter Walker	R.R.C. Walker Racing Team	Connaught Type B-Alta		6
Ret	138	(United Kingdom) John Webb	J.H. Webb	Turner-Lea Francis		
Ret	133	(United Kingdom) John Young	John Coombs	Lotus Mark IX-Lea Francis		
Ret	137	(United Kingdom) Horace Gould	Gould's Garage (Bristol)	Maserati 250F	2 laps	3
DNS	11	(United Kingdom) Leslie Marr	L. Marr	Connaught Type B-Alta		10

Previous race: 1955 Daily Record Trophy	Formula One non-championship races 1955 season	Next race: 1955 Daily Telegraph Trophy
Previous race: 1954 RedeX Trophy	RedeX Trophy	Next race: —
