= 1955 Daily Record Trophy =

- Non-championship race in the 1955 Formula One season
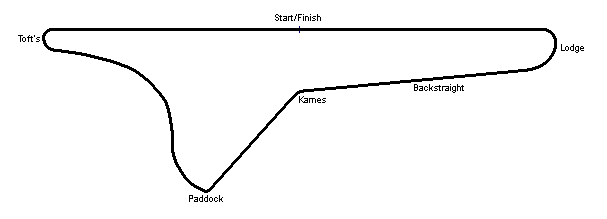

Race details
- Date: 6 August 1955
- Official name: III Daily Record Trophy
- Location: Charterhall Circuit, Berwickshire
- Course: Permanent racing facility
- Course length: 3.2 km (2.0 miles)
- Distance: 20 (final) laps, 64.0 km (40.0 miles)

Fastest lap
| Drivers | (United Kingdom) Bob Gerard | Maserati |
| | (France) Louis Rosier | Maserati |
- Time: 1:23.5

Podium
| First | (United Kingdom) Bob Gerard | Maserati |
| Second | (United Kingdom) Horace Gould | Maserati |
| Third | (France) Louis Rosier | Maserati |

The 3rd Daily Record Trophy was a motor race, run to Formula One rules, held on 6 August 1955 at Charterhall Circuit, Berwickshire. The race was run over two heats of 15 laps and a final of 20 laps, and was won by British driver Bob Gerard in a Maserati 250F. Horace Gould and Louis Rosier were second and third, also in 250Fs. Gerard and Rosier shared fastest lap.

This was the only occasion on which the Daily Record Trophy was run under Formula 1 rules, the previous races in 1953 and 1954 being Formula Libre events. It was also the last occurrence of the event.

== Results ==
=== Heats ===
Heat 1

| Pos | No. | Driver | Entrant | Car | Time/Ret. |
|---|---|---|---|---|---|
| 1 | 36 | (United Kingdom) Mike Anthony | M. Anthony | Lotus Mark X-Bristol | 23:04.2, 78.02mph |
| 2 | 70 | (United Kingdom) Alex McMillan | A. McMillan | Cooper T23-Bristol | |
| 3 | 18 | (United Kingdom) Jimmy Somervail | Border Reivers | Cooper T20-Bristol | |
| 4 | 38 | (United Kingdom) Dick Gibson | R. Gibson | Cooper T23-Bristol | |
| 5 | 25 | (United Kingdom) Cedric Brierley | J.C. Brierley | Frazer Nash-Bristol | |
| 6 | 37 | (United Kingdom) Horace Richards | H.A.R.-Riley | HAR-Riley | |
| Ret | 20 | (United Kingdom) Bruce Halford | Equipe Devone | Cooper T23-Bristol | |
| Ret | 23 | (United Kingdom) Alastair Birrell | A.W. Birrell | Cooper T20-Bristol | |
| Ret | 26 | (United Kingdom) Jack Walton | J.H. Walton | Cooper T23-Bristol | |
| Ret | | (United Kingdom) John Young | | Connaught Type A-Lea Francis | |
| DNS | 24 | (United Kingdom) Archie Scott Brown | Brian Lister Light Engineering | Lister-Bristol | |

Heat 2

| Pos | No. | Driver | Entrant | Car | Time/Ret. |
|---|---|---|---|---|---|
| 1 | 32 | (United Kingdom) Bob Gerard | Stirling Moss Ltd. | Maserati 250F | 21:26.4, 83.96mph |
| 2 | 71 | (United Kingdom) Horace Gould | Gould's Garage (Bristol) | Maserati 250F | +14.4s |
| 3 | 30 | (United Kingdom) Leslie Marr | L. Marr | Connaught Type B-Alta | +36.0s |
| 4 | 31 | (Australia) Jack Brabham | Cooper Car Company | Cooper T40-Bristol | +45.2s |
| 5 | 28 | (United Kingdom) Michael Young | Roebuck Engineering | Connaught Type A-Alta | |
| 6 | 19 | (United Kingdom) Tom Kyffin | Equipe Devone | Cooper T23-Bristol | |
| Ret | 33 | (France) Louis Rosier | Ecurie Rosier | Maserati 250F | 3 laps, fuel system |

=== Final ===
| Pos. | Driver | Car | Time/Retired |
|---|---|---|---|
| 1 | (United Kingdom) Bob Gerard | Maserati | 28:49.0, 83.29mph |
| 2 | (United Kingdom) Horace Gould | Maserati | |
| 3 | (France) Louis Rosier | Maserati | |
| 4 | (Australia) Jack Brabham | Cooper-Bristol | |
| 5 | (United Kingdom) Leslie Marr | Connaught-Alta | |
| Ret | (United Kingdom) Archie Scott Brown | Lister-Bristol | 12 laps, suspension |
| Ret | (United Kingdom) Mike Anthony | Lotus-Bristol | 5 laps |

| Previous race: 1955 London Trophy | Formula One non-championship races 1955 season | Next race: 1955 RedeX Trophy |
| Previous race: 1954 Daily Record Trophy | Daily Record Trophy | Next race: — |
