= 1954 Daily Telegraph Trophy =

- Non-championship race in the 1954 Formula One season

Race details
- Date: 2 October 1954
- Official name: I Daily Telegraph Trophy
- Location: Aintree Circuit, Lancashire
- Course: Permanent racing facility
- Course length: 4.81 km (3.00 miles)
- Distance: 17 laps, 81.80 km (51.00 miles)

Pole position
Driver	(United Kingdom) Stirling Moss	Maserati
- Time: 2:03.6

Fastest lap
Driver	(United Kingdom) Stirling Moss	Maserati
- Time: 2:04.8

Podium
First	(United Kingdom) Stirling Moss	Maserati
Second	(United Kingdom) Mike Hawthorn	Vanwall
Third	(United States) Harry Schell	Maserati

The 1st Daily Telegraph Trophy was a motor race, run to Formula One rules, held on 2 October 1954 at Aintree Circuit, Merseyside. The race was run over 17 laps, and was won by British driver Stirling Moss in a Maserati 250F. Moss also set pole and fastest lap. Mike Hawthorn was second in a Vanwall and Harry Schell third in another 250F.

== Results ==
Pos.	No.	Driver	Entrant	Car	Time/Retired	Grid
1	7	(United Kingdom) Stirling Moss	Officine Alfieri Maserati	Maserati 250F	35:49.0, 85.43 mph	1
2	8	(United Kingdom) Mike Hawthorn	Vandervell Products Ltd.	Vanwall Special	+14.4s	3
3	15	(United States) Harry Schell	Harry Schell	Maserati 250F	+15.4s	4
4	6	(Italy) Sergio Mantovani	Officine Alfieri Maserati	Maserati 250F	+17.8s	6
5	17	(Belgium) André Pilette	Equipe Gordini	Gordini Type 16	+1:30.6	5
6	1	(France) Louis Rosier	Equipe Rosier	Maserati 250F	2:06.2	10
7	10	(United Kingdom) Roy Salvadori	Gilby Engineering	Maserati 250F	17 laps	18
8	11	(United Kingdom) Bob Gerard	F.R. Gerard	Cooper T23-Bristol	+1 lap	11
9	21	(United Kingdom) John Riseley-Prichard	J. Riseley-Prichard	Connaught Type A-Lea Francis	+1 lap	9
10	23	(United Kingdom) Don Beauman	Sir Jeremy Boles	Connaught Type A-Lea Francis	+1 lap	8
11	14	(United Kingdom) Horace Gould	Gould's Garage (Bristol)	Maserati 250F	+1 lap	12
12	32	(United Kingdom) Jock Lawrence	Ecurie Ecosse	Cooper T20-Bristol	+1 lap	16
13	16	(France) Jean Behra	Equipe Gordini	Gordini Type 16	+2 laps, clutch	2
NC	5	(United Kingdom) Reg Parnell	Scuderia Ambrosiana	Ferrari 500	+3 laps, gearbox	7
NC	27	(United Kingdom) Paul Emery	Emeryson Cars	Emeryson Mk.1-Alta	+3 laps	17
Ret	34	(United Kingdom) Bill Whitehouse	W.J. Whitehouse	Connaught Type A-Lea Francis	9 laps	13
Ret	33	(United Kingdom) Leslie Thorne	Ecurie Ecosse	Connaught Type A-Lea Francis	8 laps	19
Ret	26	(United Kingdom) Keith Hall	The Border Reivers	Cooper T20-Bristol	8 laps	15
Ret	20	(United Kingdom) Charles Boulton	C.D. Boulton	Connaught Type A-Lea Francis	1 lap	14
DNA	2	(United Kingdom) Ken Wharton	Owen Racing Organisation	Maserati 250F		-
DNA	12	(United Kingdom) Jack Fairman	J.W. Webb	Turner-Lea Francis		-
DNA	19	(United Kingdom) Michael Young	Roebuck Engineering	Connaught Type A-Lea Francis	car not repaired	-
DNA	24	(United Kingdom) Alan Brown	R.J. Chase	Cooper T24-Alta		-
DNA	28	(United Kingdom) Ted Whiteaway	E.J. Whiteaway	HWM-Alta	car not repaired	-

Previous race: 1954 Goodwood Trophy	Formula One non-championship races 1954 season	Next race: 1955 Valentino Grand Prix
Previous race: —	Daily Telegraph Trophy	Next race: 1955 Daily Telegraph Trophy
