= Paul England (racing driver) =

Australian racing driver (1929–2014)

- Born: 28 March 1929; Melbourne, Australia
- Died: 17 June 2014 (aged 85)

Formula One World Championship career
- Nationality: (Australia) Australian
- Active years: 1957
- Team: privateer Cooper
- Entries: 1
- Championships: 0
- Wins: 0
- Podiums: 0
- Career points: 0
- Pole positions: 0
- Fastest laps: 0
- First entry: 1957 German Grand Prix

Paul Thomas England (28 March 1929 – 17 June 2014) was an Australian racing driver. He worked for the Repco company and raced his own 138 Holden-powered grey motor Ausca sports racing car that used a fibreglass body based on the A6GCS Maserati.

England contested a single Formula One World Championship Grand Prix race, the 1957 German Grand Prix, in a Formula Two Cooper T41-Climax. He retired from the race due to a fault with the distributor. After his return from Europe, England used a car by the same name Ausca but was a totally different creation – an 1800cc VW in front and a 2200cc VW in back both supercharged by the one supercharger with a special manifold to take the compressed intake to the other end, to win three Australian Hillclimb Championships, in 1970, 1973 and 1974. The Ausca is now in a VW museum in Ballarat.

After retiring from racing, England owned a general engineering company called Paul England & Staff in Essendon, Victoria, Australia. Paul England & Staff is run by his first child and eldest daughter, Lisa Mary Coulton and her husband Steven Coulton. Paul had ten grandchildren.

In the 1970s, England's company built 1.6 litre Ford engines for motor racing which were referred to as an England engine.

== Complete Formula One World Championship results ==
(key)

Year	Entrant	Chassis	Engine	1	2	3	4	5	6	7	8	WDC	Points
1957	Ridgeway Managements	Cooper T41 (F2)	Climax FWB 1.5 L4	ARG	MON	500	FRA	GBR	GER; Ret	PES	ITA	NC	0
