= Vanwall =

British Formula One team and constructor

- Full name: (United Kingdom) Vanwall
- Base: Acton, London, United Kingdom
- Founder(s): Tony Vandervell
- Noted staff: Colin Chapman; Frank Costin
- Noted drivers: (United Kingdom) Stirling Moss (France) Maurice Trintignant (United States) Harry Schell (United Kingdom) Stuart Lewis-Evans (United Kingdom) Tony Brooks

Formula One World Championship career
- First entry: 1954 British Grand Prix
- Races entered: 29 (28 starts)
- Engines: Vanwall
- Constructors' Championships: 1 (1958)
- Drivers' Championships: 0
- Race victories: 9
- Podiums: 13
- Points: 57
- Pole positions: 7
- Fastest laps: 6
- Final entry: 1960 French Grand Prix

Vanwall as a Formula One engine manufacturer
Formula One World Championship career
- First entry: 1954 British Grand Prix
- Last entry: 1960 French Grand Prix
- Races entered: 29 (28 starts)
- Chassis: Vanwall
- Constructors' Championships: 1 (1958)
- Drivers' Championships: 0
- Race victories: 9
- Podiums: 13
- Points: 57
- Pole positions: 7
- Fastest laps: 6

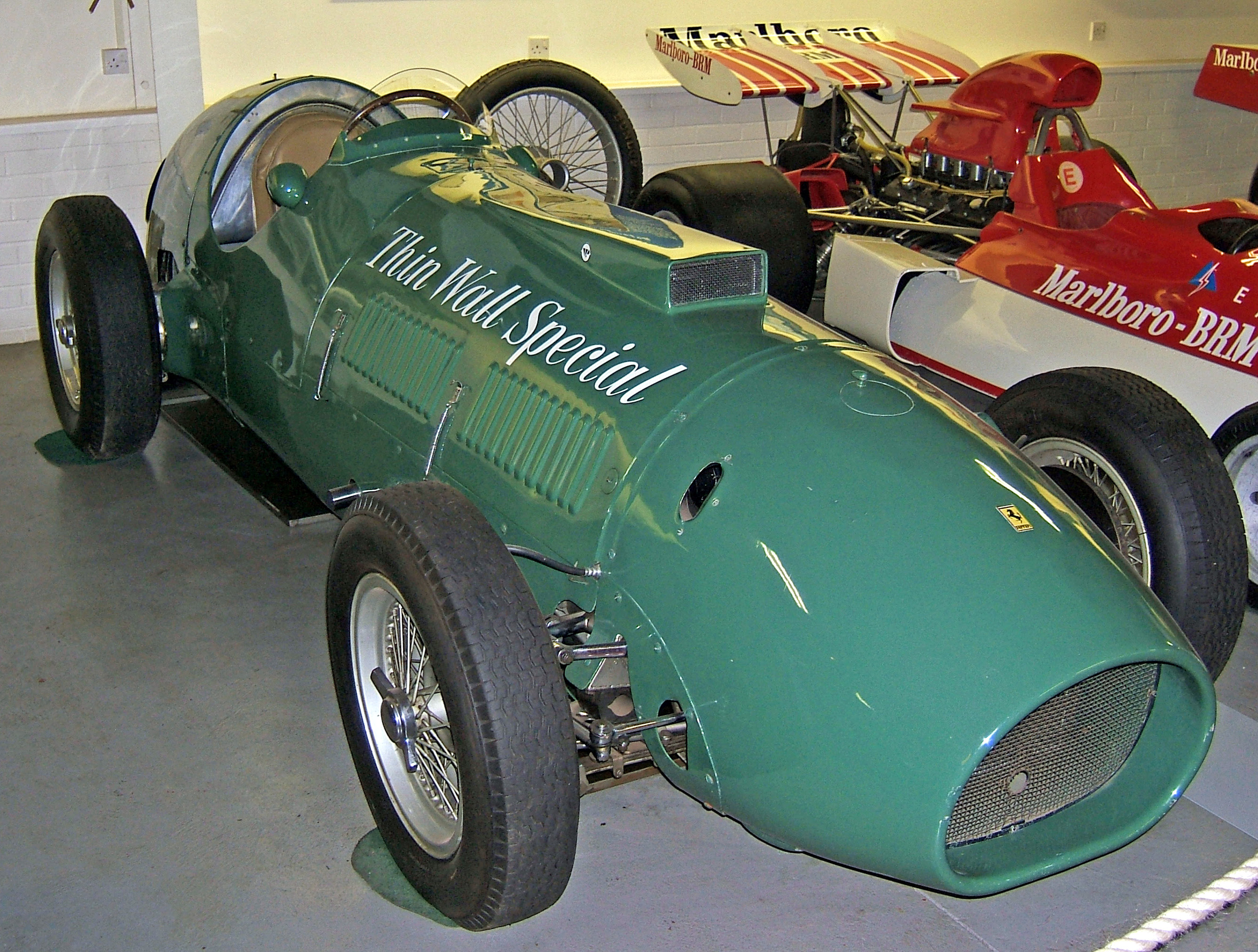
The fourth, and last, Thinwall Special. Used between 1952 and 1954.

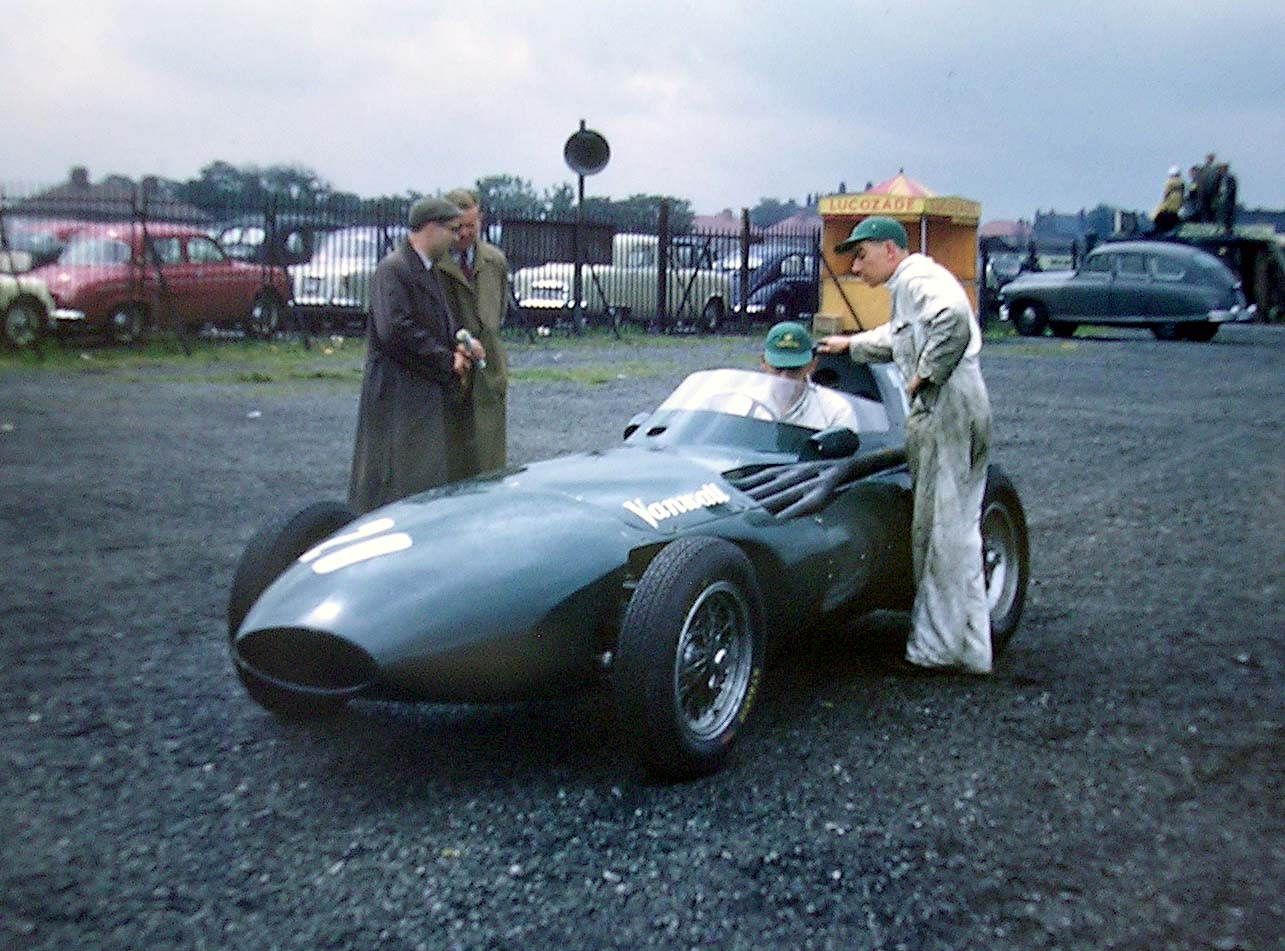
The winning Vanwall VW5 before the 1957 British Grand Prix.

Vanwall was a British motor racing team and racing car constructor that was active in Formula One during the 1950s. Founded by Tony Vandervell, the Vanwall name was derived by combining the name of the team owner with that of his Thinwall bearings produced at the Vandervell Products factory at Acton, London. Originally entering modified Ferraris in non-championship races, Vanwall constructed their first cars to race in the 1954 Formula One season.

The team achieved their first race win in the 1957 British Grand Prix, with Stirling Moss and Tony Brooks sharing VW 5, earning the team the distinction of constructing the first British-built car to win a World Championship race. Vanwall won the inaugural Constructors' Championship in Formula One in 1958, in the process allowing Moss and Brooks to finish second and third in the Drivers' Championship standings, each winning three races for Vanwall. Vandervell's failing health meant 1958 would be the last full season; the squad ran cars in a handful of races in the following years, but finished racing in 1961.

== History ==
Tony Vandervell's Vanwall Company made Babbit bearings (UK White Metal bearings) under licence from the Cleveland Graphite Bronze Company; W. A. Robotham of Rolls-Royce said that "it was an exceedingly difficult task ... knowing the American company well".

Tony Vandervell was one of the original backers of British Racing Motors. In the early 1950s he entered a series of modified Ferraris in Formule Libre races under the name "Thinwall Special".

The first actual Vanwalls were known as Vanwall Specials and were built for the new Formula 1 regulations in 1954 at Cox Green, Maidenhead. The chassis was designed by Owen Maddock and built by the Cooper Car Company. The 2.0 L engine was designed by Norton engineer Leo Kuzmicki, and was essentially four Manx single-cylinder 498 cc (30.4 cu in) (86.1 mm × 85.6 mm (3.39 in × 3.37 in)) engines with a common waterjacket, cylinder head (a copy of the Norton's) and valvetrain, with induction by four AMAL motorcycle carburetors. This combination was fitted to a Rolls-Royce B40 military engine crankcase, copied in aluminium. Designed for Formula Two, which was supplanted before it appeared, the car debuted in a Grande Epreuve in the 1954 British Grand Prix. Against 2½ litre Formula One competition, it was at a decided disadvantage. The Goodyear disc brakes (built by Vanwall) proved successful, but the front suspension and fuel and cooling systems were troublesome. Development continued with a switch to Bosch fuel injection (thanks to Vandervell's "persuading" Daimler-Benz, a major Bosch customer, to allow it), while retaining the AMAL throttle bodies; they were plagued with throttle linkage trouble, due to vibration from the big four-cylinder. Vanwall also increased the capacity of the engines, first to 2,237 cc (137 cu in) (91.0 mm × 86.0 mm (3.58 in × 3.39 in)) for Peter Collins at Monaco 1955, and then a full 2,489 cc (151.9 cu in) (96.0 mm × 86.0 mm (3.78 in × 3.39 in)). Vanwalls then ran for a season in F1 without much in the way of success. At the end of the 1955 season, it was plain that the engine was sound, but that the Ferrari-derived chassis needed improvement. It was suggested to Vandervell that he should hire the services of a young up-and-coming designer to improve their cars. The designer was Colin Chapman.

The new 1956 cars designed by Chapman (along with the aerodynamicist Frank Costin) were of space frame construction, the De Dion rear axle's unsprung weight reduced and front torsion bar added. (None of these ideas were revolutionary, but Chapman was happy simply to be meticulous.) Furthermore, a fifth gear and Porsche synchromesh were added to the transmission. The driving seat was placed above this and could not be reduced below 13 in (330 mm) above the road, making the height very problematic (the top of the driver's helmet was fully 50 in (1,270 mm) from the road surface, while the vertically mounted engine made a reduction impractical in any case), and the handling was suspect despite Chapman's best efforts. The solution which today is obvious, mounting the engine behind the driver, would take two more years to be accepted. Costin made the most of it, and produced a car "much faster in a straight line than any of its rivals".

The new car showed early promise in 1956 by winning the non-championship F1 race at Silverstone against strong opposition. It set the lap record at Syracuse Stirling Moss drove the car to victory in what was his only drive for Vanwall that year, as he was still contracted to drive for Maserati in F1. Talented drivers Harry Schell and Maurice Trintignant were the full-timers for the season. However, neither of them had much success although the car showed obvious potential.

With the car developing and becoming ever more competitive, Moss eventually decided to drive for the team in 1957. He was joined by two Englishmen, Tony Brooks and Stuart Lewis-Evans. As the 1957 season unfolded, the cars became faster and more reliable. Moss and Brooks duly shared Vanwall's first Grand Prix victory in Britain at Aintree, and Moss went on to win both the Italian (where only being piloted by Fangio enabled the Maserati to run with the Vanwalls, for Moss finished with 41 seconds in hand even after a pit stop) and Pescara Grands Prix.

At the end of 1957, alcohol fuels were banned and replaced by a compulsory 130-octane aviation gasoline. This caused problems for Vanwall and BRM with their large bore engines that required methanol for engine cooling. As a result, the Vanwall's power dropped from 290 bhp (220 kW) at 7,500 rpm (308 bhp with nitromethane) to 278 bhp (207 kW) on the test bed. During the race, where revs were reduced, only 255–262 bhp at 7,200–7,400 rpm was available. This put them at a disadvantage to the new Dino Ferrari V6 cars with a claimed 290 PS (286 bhp) at 8,300 rpm. The Vanwall's superior road holding (thanks to suspension changes, new steel wheels, and new nylon-cord Dunlop R5 racing tyres), streamlining, 5-speed gearbox, and disc brakes helped to offset this.

All three drivers stayed with the team in 1958, and Moss (wins in the Netherlands, Portugal and Morocco) and Brooks (wins in Belgium, Germany and Italy) each won three championship races that season. Vanwall became the first team to win the Constructors' Championship, held for the first time that season. However, Moss lost out to Mike Hawthorn in the Drivers' Championship by a single point to finish second, with Brooks ending the season in third. Their triumph at the end of the season was sadly marred when, during the final race of the year in Morocco, Lewis-Evans was fatally injured in an accident.

The 1958 season was the last one in which Vanwall entered every race. Vandervell's health was failing and he had been advised by his doctors to rest. The team continued half-heartedly. Brooks made one appearance in a lower and lighter Vanwall at 1959 British Grand Prix, proving less successful against the new mid-engined Coopers, and the team tried again with VW5, upgraded and renumbered VW11, in the 1960 French Grand Prix. These efforts lacked the seriousness of the past however and they were unsuccessful.

The last racing Vanwall was an "unwieldy" rear-engined machine produced for the 1961 3.0 litre Intercontinental Formula. The existing engine was enlarged to 2,605 cc (159 cu in) (96.0 mm × 90.0 mm (3.78 in × 3.54 in)), rated at 290 bhp (220 kW) on 100 octane petrol. Although showing promise when campaigned by John Surtees in the BRDC International Trophy and British Empire Trophy, development was stopped short when the formula petered out after just 5 races.

The Donington Collection had a complete example of each model, including the rear-engined car.

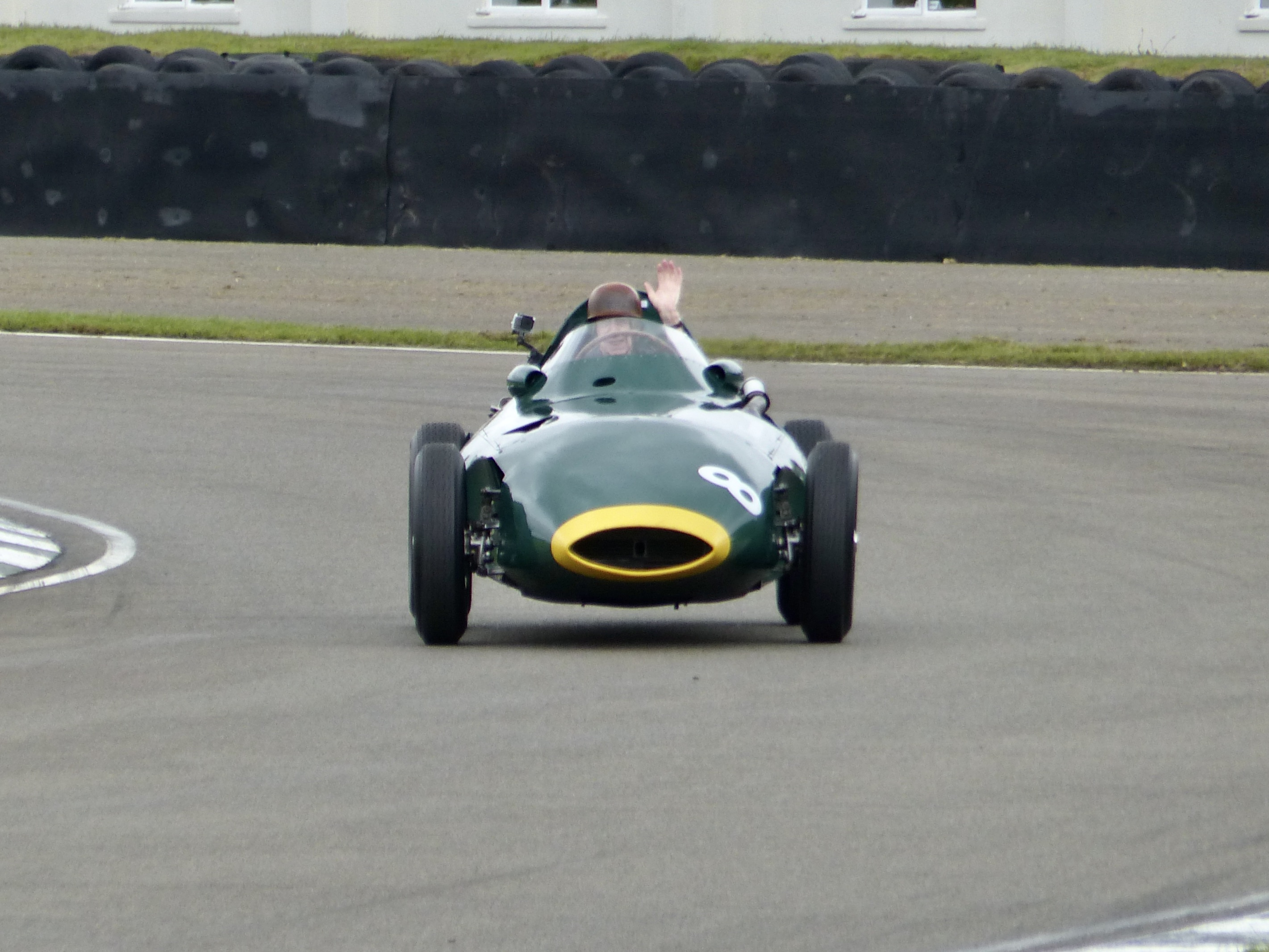
Tony Brooks in Vanwall VW5/11, 2017 Goodwood Revival Meeting

In 2003 Vanwall Cars was formed by Arthur Wolstenholme, producing the Vanwall GPR V12, a single-seater road-legal car bearing a strong resemblance to early Vanwall racing cars, and the Sports Racer, a two-seater of a similar style. In 2012 the trademark was acquired from Mahle Engine Systems UK by Sanderson International Marketing Ltd. In Summer 2016 Vanwall completed and sold an official replica 1957 Vanwall and then in Autumn 2020 Vanwall 1958 Ltd, majority owned by Iain Sanderson, announced the commissioning of Hall & Hall to build 6 original 1958 specification 'continuation cars'.

== Formula One World Championship results ==
(key)

Year	Chassis	Engine	Tyres	Driver	1	2	3	4	5	6	7	8	9	10	11	Points	WCC
1954	Vanwall Special	Vanwall L4	P		ARG	500	BEL	FRA	GBR	GER	SUI	ITA	ESP			n/a	n/a (Note: The Constructors' Championship was not awarded until 1958.)
1954	Vanwall Special	Vanwall L4	P	(United Kingdom) Peter Collins					Ret			7	DNS			n/a	n/a
1955	Vanwall VW 55	Vanwall L4	P		ARG	MON	500	BEL	NED	GBR	ITA					n/a	n/a
1955	Vanwall VW 55	Vanwall L4	P	(United Kingdom) Mike Hawthorn		Ret		Ret								n/a	n/a
1955	Vanwall VW 55	Vanwall L4	P	(United Kingdom) Ken Wharton						9 (Note: Shared drive)	Ret					n/a	n/a
1955	Vanwall VW 55	Vanwall L4	P	(United States) Harry Schell						9	Ret					n/a	n/a
1956	Vanwall VW 2	Vanwall L4	P		ARG	MON	500	BEL	FRA	GBR	GER	ITA				n/a	n/a
1956	Vanwall VW 2	Vanwall L4	P	(France) Maurice Trintignant		Ret		Ret		Ret		Ret				n/a	n/a
1956	Vanwall VW 2	Vanwall L4	P	(United States) Harry Schell		Ret		4	10	Ret		Ret				n/a	n/a
1956	Vanwall VW 2	Vanwall L4	P	(United Kingdom) Mike Hawthorn					10							n/a	n/a
1956	Vanwall VW 2	Vanwall L4	P	(United Kingdom) Colin Chapman					DNS							n/a	n/a
1956	Vanwall VW 2	Vanwall L4	P	(Argentina) José Froilán González						Ret						n/a	n/a
1956	Vanwall VW 2	Vanwall L4	P	(Italy) Piero Taruffi								Ret				n/a	n/a
1957	Vanwall VW 5	Vanwall L4	P		ARG	MON	500	FRA	GBR	GER	PES	ITA				n/a	n/a
1957	Vanwall VW 5	Vanwall L4	P	(United Kingdom) Stirling Moss		Ret			1^{P}^{F}	5	1^{F}	1				n/a	n/a
1957	Vanwall VW 5	Vanwall L4	P	(United Kingdom) Tony Brooks		2			1	9	Ret	7^{F}				n/a	n/a
1957	Vanwall VW 5	Vanwall L4	P	(United Kingdom) Stuart Lewis-Evans				Ret	7	Ret	5	Ret^{P}				n/a	n/a
1957	Vanwall VW 5	Vanwall L4	P	(United Kingdom) Roy Salvadori				Ret								n/a	n/a
1958	Vanwall VW 5	Vanwall L4	D		ARG	MON	NED	500	BEL	FRA	GBR	GER	POR	ITA	MOR	48 (57)	1st
1958	Vanwall VW 5	Vanwall L4	D	(United Kingdom) Stirling Moss		Ret	1^{F}		Ret	2	Ret^{P}	Ret^{F}	1^{P}	Ret^{P}	1^{F}	48 (57)	1st
1958	Vanwall VW 5	Vanwall L4	D	(United Kingdom) Tony Brooks		Ret^{P}	Ret		1	Ret	7	1	Ret	1	Ret	48 (57)	1st
1958	Vanwall VW 5	Vanwall L4	D	(United Kingdom) Stuart Lewis-Evans		Ret	Ret^{P}		3	Ret	4		3	Ret	Ret	48 (57)	1st
1959	Vanwall VW 59	Vanwall L4	D		MON	500	NED	FRA	GBR	GER	POR	ITA	USA			0	NC
1959	Vanwall VW 59	Vanwall L4	D	(United Kingdom) Tony Brooks					Ret							0	NC
1960	Vanwall VW 11	Vanwall L4	D		ARG	MON	500	NED	BEL	FRA	GBR	POR	ITA	USA		0	NC
1960	Vanwall VW 11	Vanwall L4	D	(United Kingdom) Tony Brooks						Ret						0	NC

=== Non-championship Formula One results ===
(key)

Year	Chassis	Engine	Driver	1	2	3	4	5	6	7	8	9	10	11	12	13	14	15	16	17	18	19	20	21	22	23	24
1954	Vanwall Special	Vanwall L4		SYR	PAU	LAV	BOR	INT	BAR	CUR	ROM	FRO	COR	BRC	CRY	ROU	CAE	AUG	COR	OUL	RED	PES	JOE	CAD	BER	GOO	DTT
1954	Vanwall Special	Vanwall L4	(Italy) Alberto Ascari			DNA																					
1954	Vanwall Special	Vanwall L4	(United Kingdom) Alan Brown					Ret																			
1954	Vanwall Special	Vanwall L4	(United Kingdom) Peter Collins																		DNA					2	
1954	Vanwall Special	Vanwall L4	(United Kingdom) Mike Hawthorn																								2
1955	Vanwall VW 1/ VW2/ VW3	Vanwall L4		NZL	BUE	VAL	PAU	GLO	BOR	INT	NAP	ALB	CUR	COR	LON	DRT	RED	DTT	OUL	AVO	SYR						
1955	Vanwall VW 1/ VW2/ VW3	Vanwall L4	(United Kingdom) Mike Hawthorn					DNA		Ret																	
1955	Vanwall VW 1/ VW2/ VW3	Vanwall L4	(United Kingdom) Ken Wharton							Ret							2										
1955	Vanwall VW 1/ VW2/ VW3	Vanwall L4	(United States) Harry Schell												2		1		Ret	1^{P}^{F}							
1955	Vanwall VW 1/ VW2/ VW3	Vanwall L4	(United Kingdom) Desmond Titterington																3								
1956	Vanwall VW 1/ VW2	Vanwall L4		BUE	GLV	SYR	AIN	INT	NAP	100	VNW	CAE	BRH														
1956	Vanwall VW 1/ VW2	Vanwall L4	(United States) Harry Schell				DNA	Ret																			
1956	Vanwall VW 1/ VW2	Vanwall L4	(United Kingdom) Stirling Moss				DNA	1^{P}^{F}																			
1957	Vanwall VW 1/ VW3/ VW7/ VW8/ VW10	Vanwall L4		BUE	SYR	PAU	GLV	NAP	RMS	CAE	INT	MOD	MOR														
1957	Vanwall VW 1/ VW3/ VW7/ VW8/ VW10	Vanwall L4	(United Kingdom) Stirling Moss		3^{F}		Ret^{P}						DNS														
1957	Vanwall VW 1/ VW3/ VW7/ VW8/ VW10	Vanwall L4	(United Kingdom) Tony Brooks		Ret		6^{F}				DNA		Ret														
1957	Vanwall VW 1/ VW3/ VW7/ VW8/ VW10	Vanwall L4	(United Kingdom) Stuart Lewis-Evans						3				2														
1957	Vanwall VW 1/ VW3/ VW7/ VW8/ VW10	Vanwall L4	(United Kingdom) Roy Salvadori						5																		
1960	Vanwall VW 5	Vanwall L4		GLV	INT	SIL	LOM	OUL																			
1960	Vanwall VW 5	Vanwall L4	(United Kingdom) Tony Brooks	7	DNA																						
1960	Lotus 18	Vanwall L4	(United Kingdom) Tony Brooks				DNS																				

== See also ==
- Vanwall Racing Team

== Notes ==
Sporting positions
Preceded by None (inaugural champion)	Formula One Constructors' Champion; 1958	Succeeded by Cooper
