= 1956 British Grand Prix =

← Previous race	Next race →
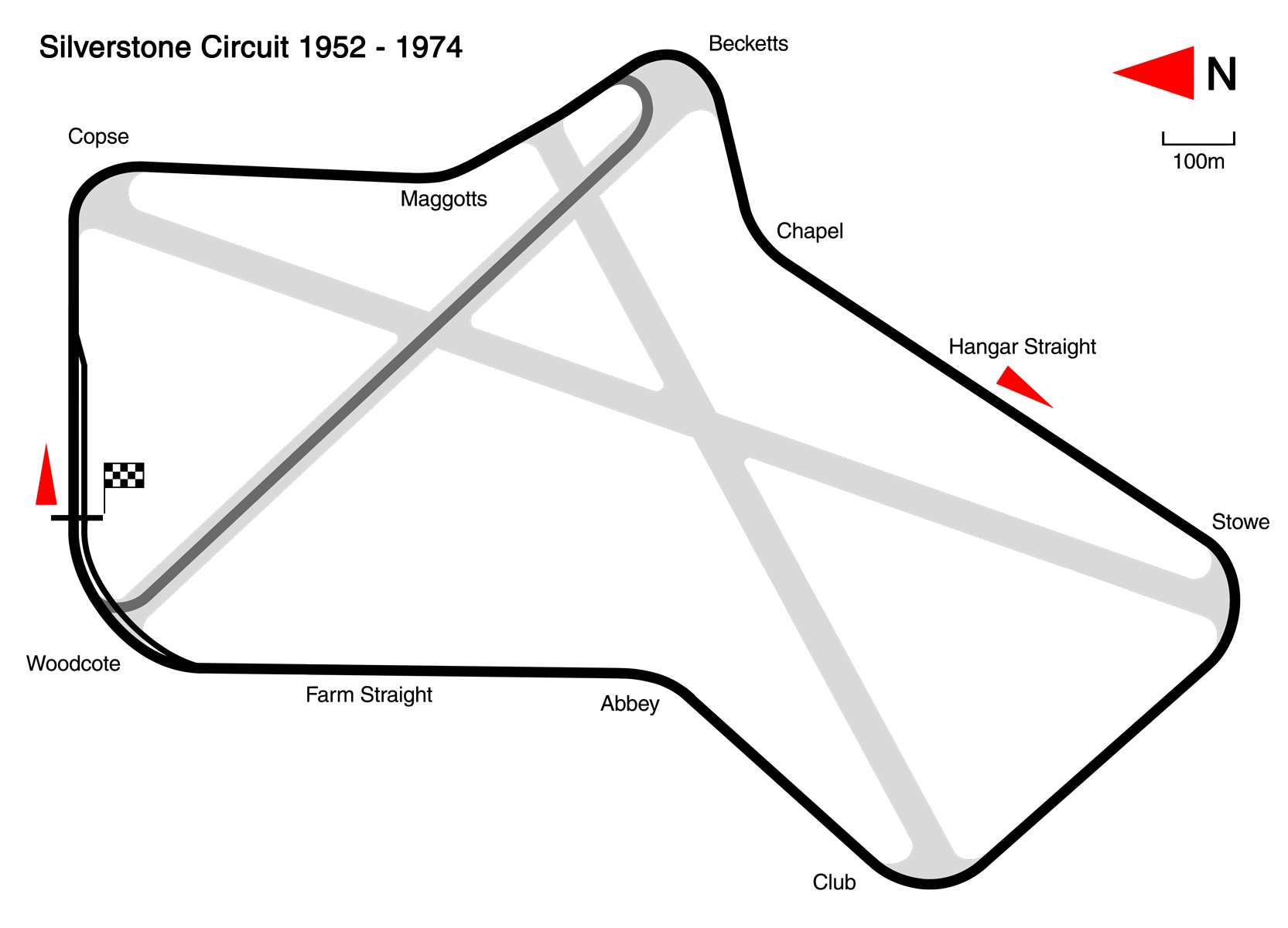
- Silverstone Circuit in 1952-1973 configuration

Race details
- Date: 14 July 1956
- Official name: 9th RAC British Grand Prix
- Location: Silverstone Circuit; Silverstone, England
- Course: Permanent racing facility
- Course length: 4.7105 km (2.927 miles)
- Distance: 101 laps, 475.766 km (295.627 miles)
- Weather: Overcast, dry

Pole position
Driver	(United Kingdom) Stirling Moss	Maserati
- Time: 1:41.0

Fastest lap
Driver	(United Kingdom) Stirling Moss	Maserati
- Time: 1:43.2

Podium
First	(Argentina) Juan Manuel Fangio	Ferrari
Second	(Spain) Alfonso de Portago (United Kingdom) Peter Collins	Ferrari
Third	(France) Jean Behra	Maserati

The 1956 British Grand Prix was a Formula One motor race held on 14 July 1956 at Silverstone. It was race 6 of 8 in the 1956 World Championship of Drivers.

== Classification ==
=== Qualifying ===
Pos	No	Driver	Constructor	Time	Gap
1	7	(United Kingdom) Stirling Moss	Maserati	1:41.0	—
2	1	(Argentina) Juan Manuel Fangio	Ferrari	1:41.0	+0.0
3	23	(United Kingdom) Mike Hawthorn	BRM	1:43.0	+2.0
4	2	(United Kingdom) Peter Collins	Ferrari	1:43.0	+2.0
5	16	(United States) Harry Schell	Vanwall	1:44.0	+3.0
6	18	(Argentina) José Froilán González	Vanwall	1:44.0	+3.0
7	28	(United Kingdom) Roy Salvadori	Maserati	1:44.0	+3.0
8	3	(Italy) Eugenio Castellotti	Ferrari	1:44.0	+3.0
9	24	(United Kingdom) Tony Brooks	BRM	1:45.0	+4.0
10	19	(United Kingdom) Archie Scott Brown	Connaught-Alta	1:45.0	+4.0
11	20	(United Kingdom) Desmond Titterington	Connaught-Alta	1:46.0	+5.0
12	4	(Spain) Alfonso de Portago	Ferrari	1:47.0	+6.0
13	8	(France) Jean Behra	Maserati	1:47.0	+6.0
14	31	(United Kingdom) Horace Gould	Maserati	1:48.0	+7.0
15	9	(Italy) Cesare Perdisa	Maserati	1:49.0	+8.0
16	17	(France) Maurice Trintignant	Vanwall	1:49.0	+8.0
17	25	(United Kingdom) Ron Flockhart	BRM	1:49.0	+8.0
18	15	(France) Robert Manzon	Gordini	1:49.0	+8.0
19	11	(Italy) Luigi Villoresi	Maserati	1:50.0	+9.0
20	29	(United Kingdom) Bruce Halford	Maserati	1:51.0	+10.0
21	21	(United Kingdom) Jack Fairman	Connaught-Alta	1:51.0	+10.0
22	26	(United Kingdom) Bob Gerard	Cooper-Bristol	1:53.0	+12.0
23	32	(United Kingdom) Paul Emery	Emeryson-Alta	1:54.0	+13.0
24	12	(Italy) Umberto Maglioli	Maserati	1:54.0	+13.0
25	10	(Spain) Paco Godia	Maserati	1:55.0	+14.0
26	14	(Brazil) Hermano da Silva Ramos	Gordini	1:56.0	+15.0
27	27	(France) Louis Rosier	Maserati	1:59.0	+18.0
28	30	(Australia) Jack Brabham	Maserati	2:01.0	+20.0

=== Race ===
Pos	No	Driver	Constructor	Laps	Time/Retired	Grid	Points
1	1	(Argentina) Juan Manuel Fangio	Ferrari	101	2:59:47.0	2	8
2	4	(Spain) Alfonso de Portago (United Kingdom) Peter Collins	Ferrari	100	+1 Lap	12	3; 3
3	8	(France) Jean Behra	Maserati	99	+2 Laps	13	4
4	21	(United Kingdom) Jack Fairman	Connaught-Alta	98	+3 Laps	21	3
5	31	(United Kingdom) Horace Gould	Maserati	97	+4 Laps	14	2
6	11	(Italy) Luigi Villoresi	Maserati	96	+5 Laps	19	
7	9	(Italy) Cesare Perdisa	Maserati	95	+6 Laps	15	
8	10	(Spain) Paco Godia	Maserati	94	+7 Laps	25	
9	15	(France) Robert Manzon	Gordini	94	+7 Laps	18	
10	3	(Italy) Eugenio Castellotti (Spain) Alfonso de Portago	Ferrari	92	+9 Laps	8	
11	26	(United Kingdom) Bob Gerard	Cooper-Bristol	88	+13 Laps	22	
Ret	7	(United Kingdom) Stirling Moss	Maserati	94	Axle	1	1^{1}
Ret	16	(United States) Harry Schell	Vanwall	87	Fuel System	5	
Ret	20	(United Kingdom) Desmond Titterington	Connaught-Alta	74	Engine	11	
Ret	17	(France) Maurice Trintignant	Vanwall	74	Fuel System	16	
Ret	14	(Brazil) Hermano da Silva Ramos	Gordini	71	Axle	26	
Ret	2	(United Kingdom) Peter Collins	Ferrari	64	Oil Pressure	4	
Ret	28	(United Kingdom) Roy Salvadori	Maserati	59	Fuel System	7	
Ret	24	(United Kingdom) Tony Brooks	BRM	39	Accident	9	
Ret	23	(United Kingdom) Mike Hawthorn	BRM	24	Transmission	3	
Ret	27	(France) Louis Rosier	Maserati	23	Electrical	27	
Ret	29	(United Kingdom) Bruce Halford	Maserati	22	Engine	20	
Ret	12	(Italy) Umberto Maglioli	Maserati	21	Gearbox	24	
Ret	19	(United Kingdom) Archie Scott Brown	Connaught-Alta	16	Transmission	10	
Ret	32	(United Kingdom) Paul Emery	Emeryson-Alta	12	Ignition	23	
Ret	30	(Australia) Jack Brabham	Maserati	3	Engine	28	
Ret	25	(United Kingdom) Ron Flockhart	BRM	2	Engine	17	
Ret	18	(Argentina) José Froilán González	Vanwall	0	Transmission	6	

Notes

- ^1 – 1 point for fastest lap

== Shared drives ==
- Car #4: Alfonso de Portago (70 laps) and Peter Collins (30 laps). They shared the 6 points for second place.
- Car #3: Eugenio Castellotti (80 laps) and Alfonso de Portago (12 laps).

== Notes ==
- This race marked the first Formula One podium for a Spanish driver.
- This was the first race entry and start for British manufacturer Emeryson.

== Championship standings after the race ==
Drivers' Championship standings

	Pos	Driver	Points
	1	(United Kingdom) Peter Collins	22
1	2	(Argentina) Juan Manuel Fangio	21
1	3	(France) Jean Behra	18
	4	(United Kingdom) Stirling Moss	13
	5	(United States) Pat Flaherty	8

- Note: Only the top five positions are included.

Previous race: 1956 French Grand Prix	FIA Formula One World Championship; 1956 season	Next race: 1956 German Grand Prix
Previous race: 1955 British Grand Prix	British Grand Prix	Next race: 1957 British Grand Prix
