= Archie Scott Brown =

British racing driver (1927–1958)

- Born: 13 May 1927; Paisley, Renfrewshire
- Died: 19 May 1958 (aged 31); Heusy, Belgium

Formula One World Championship career
- Nationality: (United Kingdom) British
- Active years: 1956
- Team: Connaught
- Entries: 1
- First entry: 1956 British Grand Prix

William Archibald Scott Brown, known as Archie, (13 May 1927 – 19 May 1958) was a British Formula One and sports car racing driver from Scotland who had a prodigious racing ability despite having the fingers of his right hand missing and having to use his palm to drive.

Scott Brown became known as motorsport's first disabled driver and battled considerable adversity (including having his licence revoked) to participate in, and win, several prestigious races.

== Early life ==
Scott Brown (although often shown as Scott-Brown, the name should not be hyphenated) was born in Paisley on 13 May 1927. As a result of German Measles during his mother's pregnancy, he was born with severe disablement to his legs (with his feet twisted almost backwards) and without the fingers of his right hand. Tremendous determination, 22 operations over a two-year period, and months spent in plaster meant that he was able to walk, although he never grew over 5'0" (152 cm) tall. He was able to walk unaided by the age of six. He was educated at Clifton Hall School and Merchiston Castle School, in Edinburgh, Scotland.

Scott Brown took up motor sport early in life after his father built him a small car to aid his mobility. His first competitive race was in 1951, in his own MG roadster, bought using a small legacy.

== Career ==
After Scott Brown won two races at Snetterton on 3 April 1954, Sid Green of Gilby Engineering noticed that he had an unformed right hand and brought this to the attention of the race stewards. Scott Brown was forthwith banned from motor racing, a devastating blow to the up-and-coming racing driver. It brought his burgeoning career to a sudden halt and his future looked uncertain. However, Earl Howe, the president of the British Racing Drivers' Club, had previously seen Scott Brown driving and had made a note to find out who he was. When he made contact with Scott Brown and discovered that he had subsequently been banned from racing, he supported Scott Brown's appeal to the Royal Automobile Club. Dr Dudley Benjafield and Gregor Grant, the then-editor of Autosport, also supported Scott Brown's appeal. By June 1954, Scott Brown had his licence back.

After being discovered and championed by Brian Lister, Scott Brown enjoyed great success racing Lister Cars. As his reputation grew, his name became closely linked with that of Lister, initially driving Lister's Tojeiro special, and later in racing cars built by Lister himself, and bearing his name. He enjoyed much success driving Lister-Jaguars Knobblys. Known for his courageous driving style, he was often to be seen in corners getting his Lister very sideways indeed. Once when asked about the possibility of the Lister's brakes failing completely, he responded that he would "carry on without them, old boy".

Over the few years Scott Brown was in the sport, he developed a fierce but good-natured rivalry with the rising American driving talent Masten Gregory. He participated in one Formula One World Championship Grand Prix on 14 July 1956, scoring no championship points. He also attempted to qualify for the Italian Grand Prix in the same year, but was excluded due to his lack of the required International Licence, his disability precluding the granting of such a licence at the time. He won the British Empire Trophy in 1955 and again in 1957. In his short career, he scored a total of 71 race victories, 15 of which came from international competition.

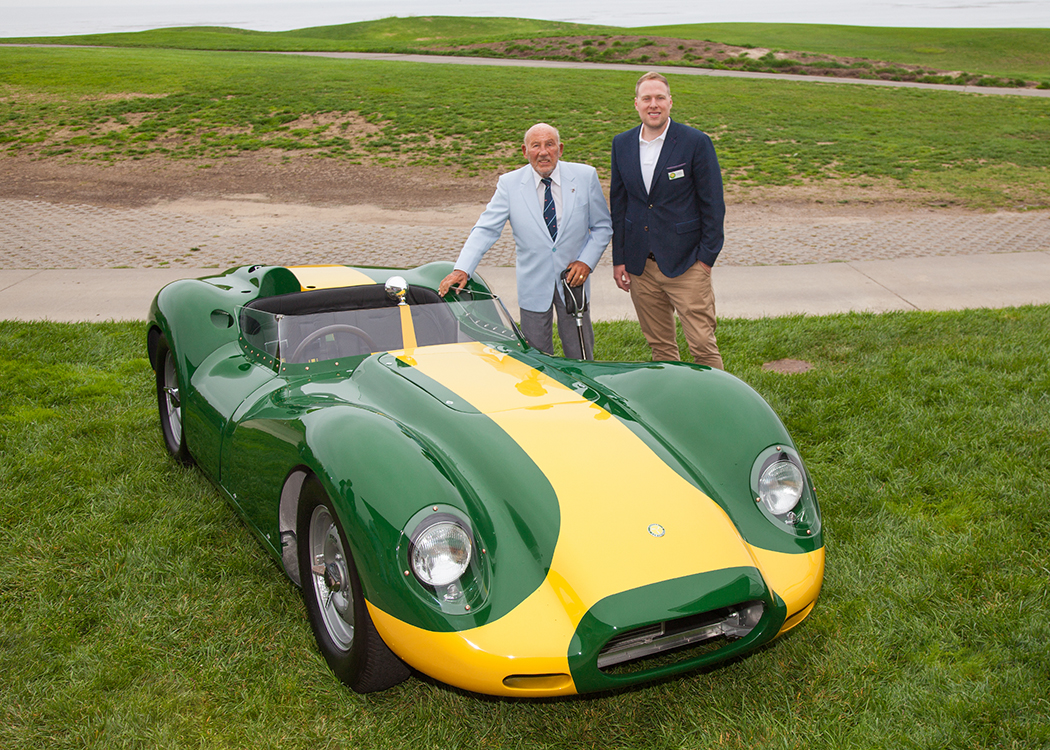
Scott Brown was famous for racing the Lister Knobbly. Sir Stirling Moss also raced the car and is pictured here with an owner of Lister Cars

== Death ==
Scott Brown was fatally injured on 18 May 1958 during a sports car race at Spa-Francorchamps, driving a Lister Knobbly and duelling for the lead with Masten Gregory driving an Ecurie Ecosse Lister Jaguar. Battling hard, they swapped the lead between them, inches apart. The competition was so fierce that Scott Brown dented his car's nose on the rear of the Ecosse car on lap three. With Scott Brown leading on lap six, they arrived at Blanchimont, then in the Clubhouse bend (where Richard Seaman had died in 1939), found the track slick with rain; the right-hand front wheel of the Lister hit a road sign, snapping the track rod and causing a disastrous accident. Scott Brown died in hospital at Heusy the following day, less than a week after his 31st birthday.

== Complete Formula One World Championship results ==
(key)

Year	Entrant	Chassis	Engine	1	2	3	4	5	6	7	8	WDC	Points
1956	Connaught Engineering	Connaught B	Alta Straight-4	ARG	MON	500	BEL	FRA	GBR; Ret	GER	ITA	NC	0
