= 1957 German Grand Prix =

← Previous race	Next race →
- Nürburgring layout

Race details
- Date: 4 August 1957
- Official name: XIX Großer Preis von Deutschland
- Location: Nürburgring, Nürburg, West Germany
- Course: Permanent road course
- Course length: 22.810 km (14.173 miles)
- Distance: 22 laps, 501.820 km (311.806 miles)

Pole position
Driver	(Argentina) Juan Manuel Fangio	Maserati
- Time: 9:25.6

Fastest lap
Driver	(Argentina) Juan Manuel Fangio	Maserati
- Time: 9:17.4

Podium
First	(Argentina) Juan Manuel Fangio	Maserati
Second	(United Kingdom) Mike Hawthorn	Ferrari
Third	(United Kingdom) Peter Collins	Ferrari

The 1957 German Grand Prix was a Formula One motor race held on 4 August 1957 at Nürburgring which due to its length with 9-minute lap times also was opened to Formula Two cars which were not eligible for World Championship points.

It was race 6 of 8 in the 1957 World Championship of Drivers. The 22 lap race was won by Juan Manuel Fangio, and is often cited as one of the greatest victories in racing history. It was Fangio's fourth victory out of the seven races in the season contested by Formula 1 cars - excluding the Indianapolis 500, in which only US drivers competed, using USAC Championship cars.

Furthermore, due to the number of points he had accumulated in the season (34 to Luigi Musso's 16), his victory at the Nürburgring mathematically clinched Fangio's fifth World Championship title with two races to go – a record that stood until 2003 when Michael Schumacher won his sixth title to become the new record world champion. The race was also notable for being Fangio's 24th and last victory in F1; his career still stands as having the highest win percentage ever, with 46.15% of his 52 race entries being wins.

== Report ==
Fangio had taken notice of the tyre and fuel-level selection of the Ferrari drivers, and realized they were probably going to run the entire race without a pit stop. Fangio decided he would use softer tyres, and only a half tank of fuel. This would allow the car to take corners faster, but also require a pit stop. Behra did the same, and was the first to come into the pits after lap 10. He even left his car, to reduce the weight that had to get jacked up, and to wash his face. After the car was refuelled, the filler cap, opening forward from his head rest, was snapped off when Behra jumped back into the seat. With the cap retrieved and closed, Behra rejoined in 9th position.

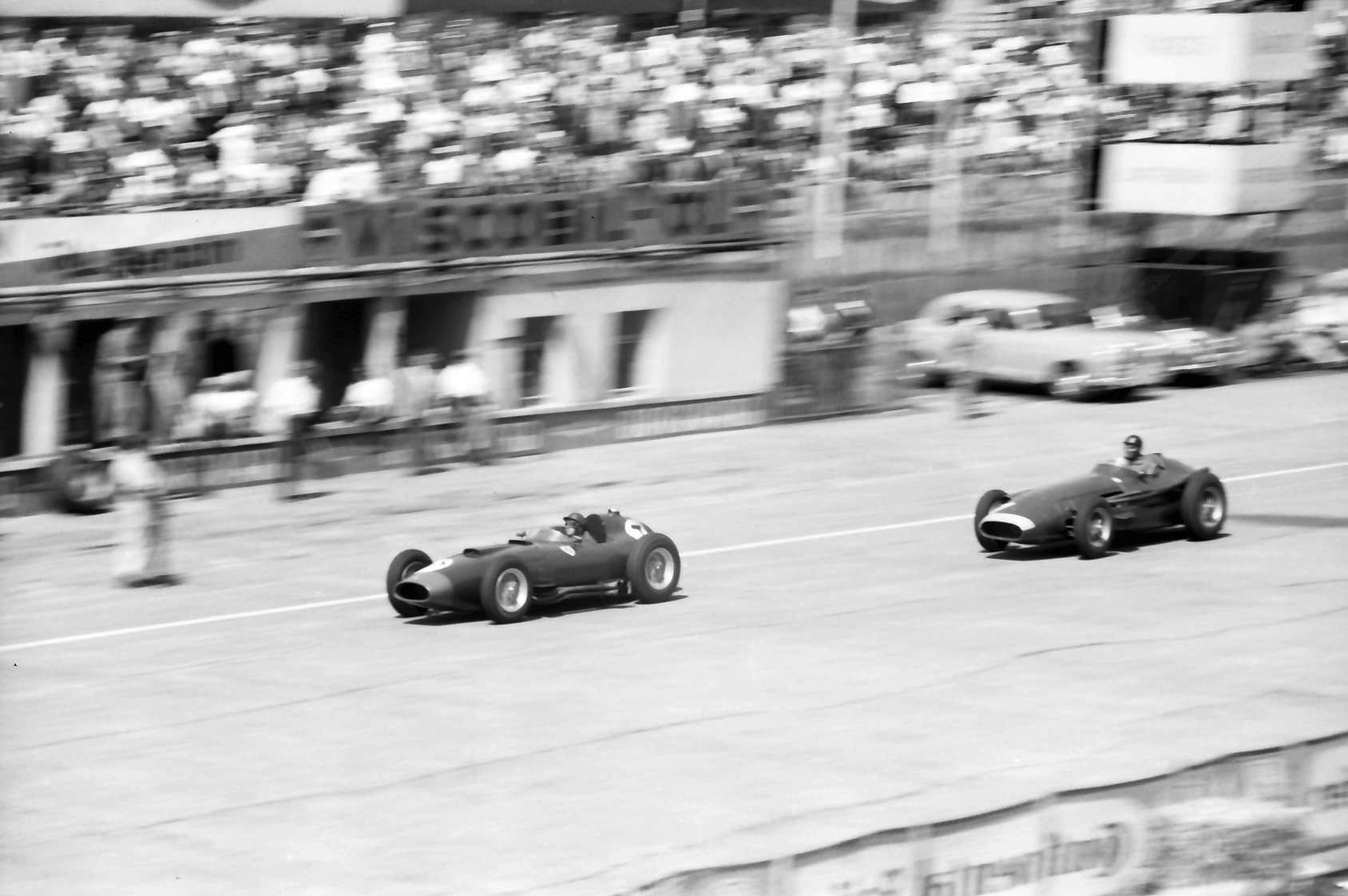
Fangio chases down Collins

Fangio took his pit stop on lap 13, in first place, and 30 seconds ahead of Hawthorn and Collins. His stop was even more of a disaster than the preceding one of Behra. With Fangio out, the mechanic on the right removed his rear right Centrelock wheel quickly but let the winged nut roll under the car without noticing. He had the new tyre on while the left side mechanic was still hammering on the knock-off nut to open it. Finding the nut took nearly half a minute. Fangio left the pit lane in third place, and 48 seconds behind Collins who was in second place. But in his Maserati 250F he began to mount a charge. Over the next 10 laps, Fangio broke and rebroke the lap record 9 times (7 of the records were in successive laps) and he took 15.5 seconds off Hawthorn's lead in the first lap, then another 8.5 seconds in the next lap. Early in the 21st lap, Fangio went on the inside of the left corner at the ESSO Terrasse taking second place from Collins. Late in the 21st lap, during a left corner, Fangio cut past Hawthorn on the inside of the corner, with only his right tyres on the track and his left tyres on the grass. This probably took place at the left-right combination before the Breidscheid bridge, as Fangio said it was at a 90° left followed by an also tight right just before Breidscheid and Hawthorn recollected being overtaken at a right turning bend. Fangio probably overtook Hawthorn in the left turn and then closed the door going to the right turn, thus boxing Hawthorn in. Fangio maintained his lead, but not easily, as Hawthorn fought back, nearly overtaking Fangio at a few corners, but to no avail, and Fangio won the race with about 3 seconds of a lead.

After the race, Fangio commented, "I have never driven that quickly before in my life and I don't think I will ever be able to do it again". Later on, Fangio was also quoted as saying: "Nürburgring was my favourite track. I fell totally in love with it and I believe that on that day in 1957 I finally managed to master it. It was as if I had screwed all the secrets out of it and got to know it once and for all... For two days I couldn't sleep, still making those leaps in the dark on those curves where I had never before had the courage to push things so far."

=== Formula 2 ===
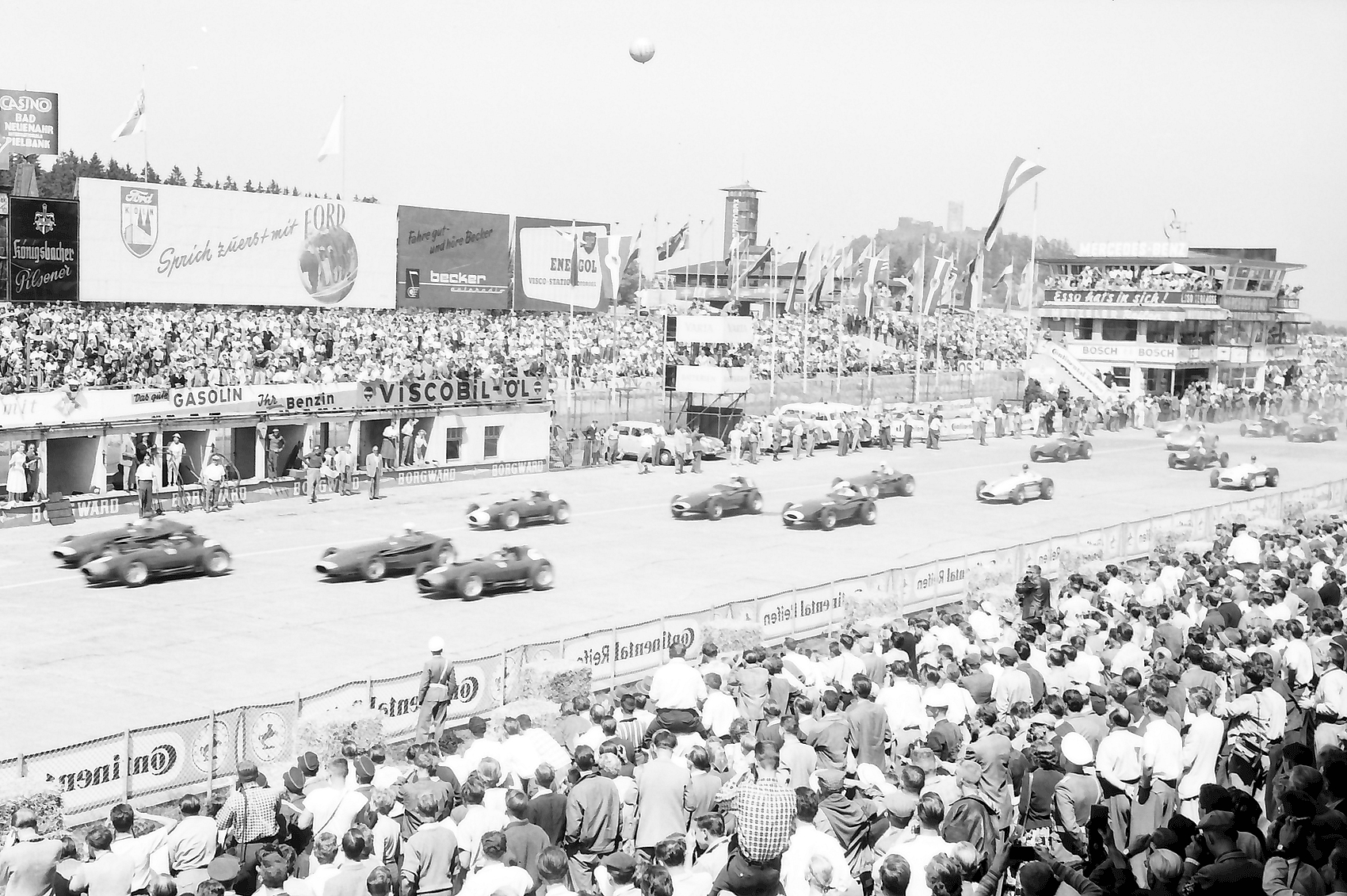
Race start with eight red and green F1s leading. On the right two white Centro Sud Maserati, then the first F2s, a Cooper and two Porsche

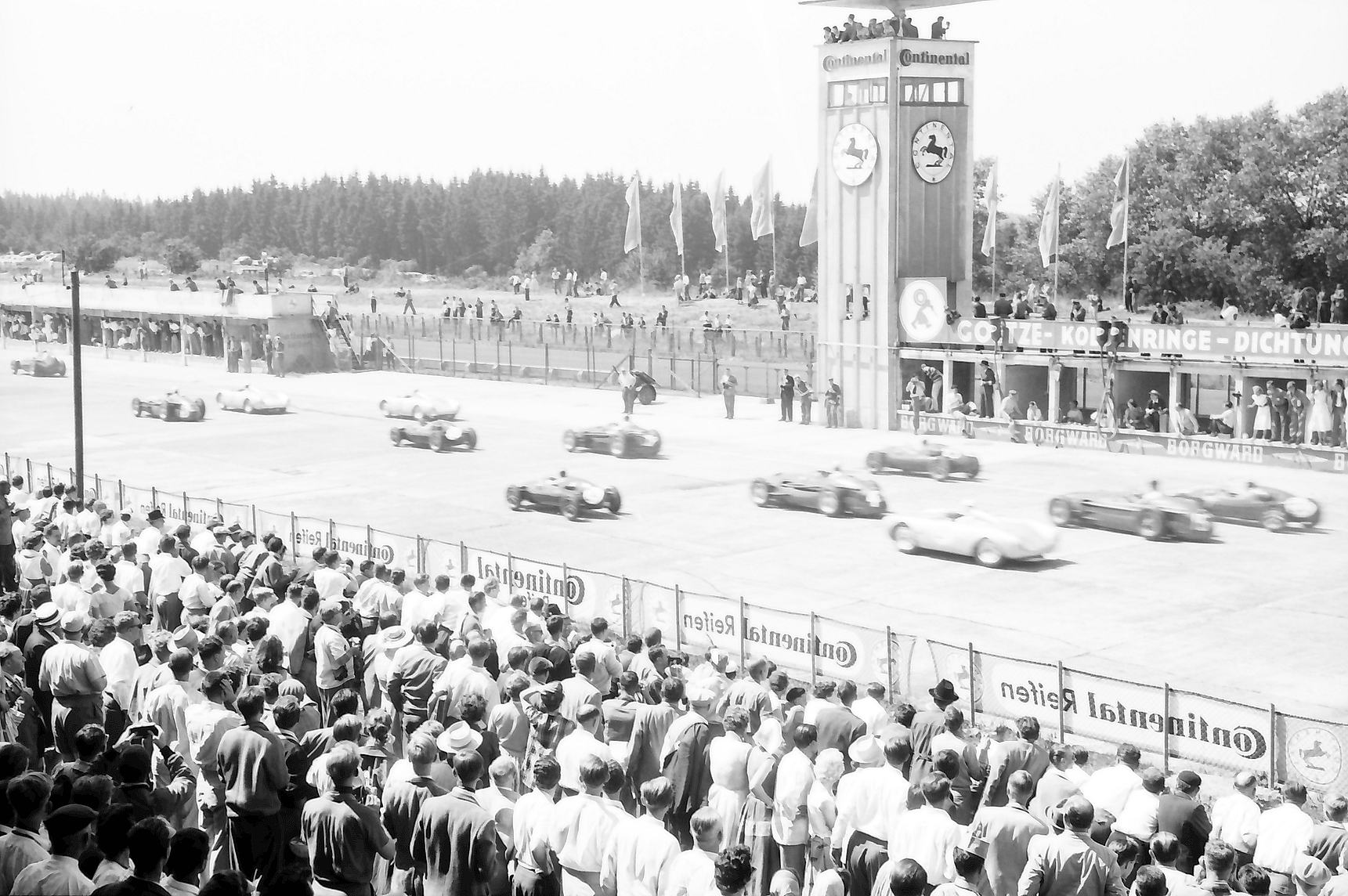
Mix of F1 and F2s in the middle of the field

To increase participation and provide more action for the spectators, the organizers opened the field to 1500cc Formula 2 cars. The two races were run at the same time but the Formula 2 entries (shown in yellow) were not eligible for World Championship points and some sources do not consider these starts in career stats. While all F1 cars still had the engine in front, with the driver sitting above or next to the drivetrain, all the F2 entrants already used the Rear mid-engine, rear-wheel-drive layout that would dominate F1 from 1959 onwards. F2 regulations allowed closed bodywork, thus three Porsche 550A sportscars were entered from which only passenger seat and spare wheel were removed.

The best F2 was the Porsche of Edgar Barth who qualified and finished 12th, ahead of several 2500cc F1, and ahead of no less than six Cooper T43-Climax, including future World Champion Jack Brabham.

== Classification ==
=== Qualifying ===
Pos	No	Driver	Constructor	Time	Gap
1	1	(Argentina) Juan Manuel Fangio	Maserati	9:25.6	—
2	8	(United Kingdom) Mike Hawthorn	Ferrari	9:28.4	+2.8
3	2	(France) Jean Behra	Maserati	9:30.5	+4.9
4	7	(United Kingdom) Peter Collins	Ferrari	9:34.7	+9.1
5	11	(United Kingdom) Tony Brooks	Vanwall	9:36.1	+10.5
6	3	(United States) Harry Schell	Maserati	9:39.2	+13.6
7	10	(United Kingdom) Stirling Moss	Vanwall	9:41.2	+15.6
8	6	(Italy) Luigi Musso	Ferrari	9:43.1	+17.5
9	12	(United Kingdom) Stuart Lewis-Evans	Vanwall	9:45.0	+19.4
10	16	(United States) Masten Gregory	Maserati	9:51.5	+25.9
11	17	(Germany) Hans Herrmann	Maserati	10:00.0	+34.4
12	21	(West Germany) Edgar Barth	Porsche	10:02.2	+36.6
13	4	(Italy) Giorgio Scarlatti	Maserati	10:04.9	+39.3
14	23	(United Kingdom) Roy Salvadori	Cooper-Climax	10:06.0	+40.4
15	20	(Italy) Umberto Maglioli	Porsche	10:08.9	+43.3
16	15	(United Kingdom) Bruce Halford	Maserati	10:14.5	+48.9
17	28	(United Kingdom) Brian Naylor	Cooper-Climax	10:15.0	+49.4
18	24	(Australia) Jack Brabham	Cooper-Climax	10:18.8	+53.2
19	19	(United Kingdom) Horace Gould	Maserati	10:20.8	+55.2
20	27	(Netherlands) Carel Godin de Beaufort	Porsche	10:25.9	+1:00.3
21	18	(Spain) Paco Godia	Maserati	10:32.3	+1:06.7
22	25	(United Kingdom) Tony Marsh	Cooper-Climax	10:48.2	+1:22.6
23	26	(Australia) Paul England	Cooper-Climax	11:08.4	+1:42.8
24	29	(United Kingdom) Dick Gibson	Cooper-Climax	11:46.4	+2:20.8

=== Race ===
Pos	No	Driver	Constructor	Laps	Time/Retired	Grid	Points
1	1	(Argentina) Juan Manuel Fangio	Maserati	22	3:30:38.3	1	9^{1}
2	8	(United Kingdom) Mike Hawthorn	Ferrari	22	+3.6 secs	2	6
3	7	(United Kingdom) Peter Collins	Ferrari	22	+35.6 secs	4	4
4	6	(Italy) Luigi Musso	Ferrari	22	+3:37.6	8	3
5	10	(United Kingdom) Stirling Moss	Vanwall	22	+4:37.2	7	2
6	2	(France) Jean Behra	Maserati	22	+4:38.5	3	
7	3	(United States) Harry Schell	Maserati	22	+6:47.5	6	
8	16	(United States) Masten Gregory	Maserati	21	+1 Lap	10	
9	11	(United Kingdom) Tony Brooks	Vanwall	21	+1 Lap	5	
10	4	(Italy) Giorgio Scarlatti	Maserati	21	+1 Lap	13	
11	15	(United Kingdom) Bruce Halford	Maserati	21	+1 Lap	16	
12	21	(West Germany) Edgar Barth	Porsche	21	+1 Lap	12	
13	28	(United Kingdom) Brian Naylor	Cooper-Climax	20	+2 Laps	17	
14	27	(Netherlands) Carel Godin de Beaufort	Porsche	20	+2 Laps	20	
15	25	(United Kingdom) Tony Marsh	Cooper-Climax	17	+5 Laps	22	
Ret	17	(Germany) Hans Herrmann	Maserati	14	Chassis	11	
Ret	20	(Italy) Umberto Maglioli	Porsche	13	Engine	15	
Ret	23	(United Kingdom) Roy Salvadori	Cooper-Climax	11	Suspension	14	
Ret	18	(Spain) Paco Godia	Maserati	11	Steering	21	
Ret	12	(United Kingdom) Stuart Lewis-Evans	Vanwall	10	Gearbox	9	
Ret	24	(Australia) Jack Brabham	Cooper-Climax	6	Transmission	18	
Ret	26	(Australia) Paul England	Cooper-Climax	4	Distributor	23	
Ret	29	(United Kingdom) Dick Gibson	Cooper-Climax	3	Steering	24	
Ret	19	(United Kingdom) Horace Gould	Maserati	1	Axle	19	

Notes

- ^1 – Includes 1 point for fastest lap

== Notes ==
- Due to F2 cars being allowed to participate, this was the Formula One World Championship debut for British drivers Brian Naylor, Tony Marsh and Dick Gibson, Dutch driver Carel Godin de Beaufort and Australian driver Paul England.
- Due to F2 cars being allowed to participate, this was the Formula One World Championship debut for German manufacturer Porsche (both as a constructor and as an engine supplier).

== Championship standings after the race ==
- **Bold text** indicates the World Champion.

Drivers' Championship standings

	Pos	Driver	Points
	1	(Argentina) **Juan Manuel Fangio**	34
	2	(Italy) Luigi Musso	16
3	3	(United Kingdom) Mike Hawthorn	13
1	4	(United Kingdom) Tony Brooks	10
1	5	(United States) Sam Hanks	8

- Note: Only the top five positions are included.

Previous race: 1957 British Grand Prix	FIA Formula One World Championship; 1957 season	Next race: 1957 Pescara Grand Prix
Previous race: 1956 German Grand Prix	German Grand Prix	Next race: 1958 German Grand Prix
