= Jack Fairman =

British racing driver (1913–2002)

- Born: 15 March 1913; Horley, Surrey, England, UK
- Died: 7 February 2002 (aged 88); Rugby, Warwickshire, England, UK

Formula One World Championship career
- Nationality: (United Kingdom) British
- Active years: 1953, 1955 – 1961
- Team(s): HWM, Connaught, BRM, Cooper, Ferguson
- Entries: 13 (12 starts)
- Championships: 0
- Wins: 0
- Podiums: 0
- Career points: 5
- Pole positions: 0
- Fastest laps: 0
- First entry: 1953 British Grand Prix
- Last entry: 1961 Italian Grand Prix

John Eric George "Jack" Fairman (15 March 1913 – 7 February 2002) was a British racing driver from England. He participated in 13 Formula One Grands Prix, making his debut on 18 July 1953. He scored a total of five championship points, all of which came in the 1956 season.

== Career summary ==
Fairman was born in Horley, and was only an occasional racing driver, his main source of income coming from running the family precision tool manufacturing company. He got his first taste of motorsport before World War II, driving an Alvis 12/50 in trials and hill climb events from 1934. He quickly moved on to races at the Brooklands circuit, but the war intervened and he spent the duration on active service in the Tank Corps.

Postwar, Fairman's reliable and dogged driving attributes saw him achieve many successes in sports car racing, particularly in endurance events. He drove for a number of top-rank teams during this time, including Bristol, Jaguar, Ecurie Ecosse, and Aston Martin. It was with Aston that Fairman won his most significant events, partnering Stirling Moss in the 1959 Nürburgring 1000 km, and Tourist Trophy at Goodwood. He also made a brief Formula One debut at the 1953 British Grand Prix, driving and retiring an HWM 53.

Fairman's engineering experience and dependable driving made him an obvious choice for constructors to contact when they needed a test driver. His most significant contribution in this role was during the development of Connaught's Formula Two and later Formula One cars. Between sports car commitments and his own factory, Fairman managed to fit in occasional Formula One starts, usually at the British or Italian Grands Prix. He took a Connaught Type B to two points finishes during the 1956 Formula One season, his only points in a very long Formula One career, finishing tenth in the World Championship that year.

Following Bernie Ecclestone's purchase of the remains of Connaught in 1958, Fairman continued with his sporadic Formula One career in a wide variety of machines. His only notable entry in the years that followed was when he became simultaneously the last man ever to start a Grand Prix with a front engined car and the first to drive a four-wheel drive car, at the 1961 British Grand Prix. The car in question was the experimental Ferguson P99, designed by Ferguson Research Ltd. and run by the Rob Walker Racing Team. Unfortunately for Fairman, his RWR teammate Stirling Moss suffered brake failure in his Lotus 18 and took over the 4WD machine in Fairman's stead. Moss was then later disqualified for receiving a push start, which also ended Fairman's race. Fairman's last Formula One race was in the 1963 non-Championship Imola Grand Prix event, driving a Porsche for Ecurie Maarsbergen.

Fairman died, aged 88, in Rugby, Warwickshire. The pub chain Wetherspoons has opened a pub named The Jack Fairman in his birthplace of Horley. Opened on 12 February 2007, it occupies the buildings in Victoria Road which originally housed Fairman's garage and has pictures of him around the walls and details can be located on their website. Prior to the pub opening, it was the local Kwik Fit for many years.

== Complete Formula One World Championship results ==
(key)

Year	Entrant	Chassis	Engine	1	2	3	4	5	6	7	8	9	10	11	WDC	Points
1953	HW Motors	HWM 53	Alta	ARG	500	NED	BEL	FRA	GBR; Ret	GER	SUI				NC	0
1953	Connaught Engineering	Connaught Type A	Lea Francis									ITA; NC			NC	0
1955	Connaught Engineering	Connaught Type B	Alta	ARG	MON	500	BEL	NED	GBR; DNS	ITA					NC	0
1956	Connaught Engineering	Connaught Type B	Alta	ARG	MON	500	BEL	FRA	GBR; 4	GER	ITA; 5				10th	5
1957	Owen Racing Organisation	BRM P25	BRM	ARG	MON	500	FRA	GBR; Ret	GER	PES	ITA				NC	0
1958	BC Ecclestone	Connaught Type B	Alta	ARG	MON	NED	500	BEL	FRA	GBR; Ret	GER	POR	ITA		NC	0
1958	Cooper Car Company	Cooper T45	Coventry Climax											MOR; 8	NC	0
1959	High Efficiency Motors	Cooper T45	Coventry Climax	MON	500	NED	FRA	GBR; Ret	GER	POR					NC	0
1959	High Efficiency Motors	Cooper T45	Maserati								ITA; Ret	USA			NC	0
1960	CT Atkins	Cooper T51	Coventry Climax	ARG	MON	500	NED	BEL	FRA	GBR; Ret	POR	ITA	USA		NC	0
1961	Rob Walker Racing	Ferguson P99	Coventry Climax	MON	NED	BEL	FRA	GBR; DSQ	GER						NC	0
1961	Fred Tuck Cars	Cooper T45	Coventry Climax							ITA; Ret	USA				NC	0
