= 1958 Argentine Grand Prix =

← Previous race	Next race →

Race details
- Date: 19 January 1958
- Official name: VI Gran Premio de la Republica Argentina
- Location: Autódromo Municipal Ciudad de Buenos Aires, Buenos Aires
- Course: Permanent racing facility
- Course length: 3.912 km (2.431 miles)
- Distance: 80 laps, 312.96 km (194.48 miles)

Pole position
Driver	(Argentina) Juan Manuel Fangio	Maserati
- Time: 1:42.0

Fastest lap
Driver	(Argentina) Juan Manuel Fangio	Maserati
- Time: 1:41.8

Podium
First	(United Kingdom) Stirling Moss	Cooper-Climax
Second	(Italy) Luigi Musso	Ferrari
Third	(United Kingdom) Mike Hawthorn	Ferrari

The 1958 Argentine Grand Prix was a Formula One motor race held on 19 January 1958 at Autodromo Municipal Ciudad de Buenos Aires Circuit. It was race 1 of 11 in the 1958 World Championship of Drivers and race 1 of 10 in the 1958 International Cup for Formula One Manufacturers which was introduced for that year, without including the Indy 500. The sixth Argentine Grand Prix was held on the #2 four kilometre variation of the circuit, over 80 laps for a total race distance of 313 kilometres.

The 10-car-race was won by British driver Stirling Moss, who, in absence of his Vanwall team, drove Rob Walker's privately entered Cooper T43-Climax. Apart from being the first World Drivers' Championship race win for Cooper as a constructor it was also the first win for a rear-mid-engined car in Formula One, the first in a Grand Prix since the 1930s Auto Union racing cars, the first F1 win for a car entered by a privateer team, the first win for a car powered by an engine built by another manufacturer and the first win for a British car with a blue livery, deviating from the traditional green colour used by British teams until then, apart from Germans often racing as Silver Arrows rather than in white. Moss took his seventh Grand Prix victory by 2.7 seconds over Italian driver Luigi Musso (Ferrari 246 F1). Musso's British teammate Mike Hawthorn (Ferrari 246 F1) was third.

== Report ==
A change in fuel regulations that banned alcohol and methanol meant that the re-tuning of British teams Vanwall and BRM engines would not be ready in time for the long trip to the Argentine race held in mid-January, four months ahead of the second race of the season in Monaco. Teams and engine suppliers that not only were racing in F1 but also with sports cars had more experience with using also regular gasoline.

As a result, his race had the fewest entries (10) of any Grand Prix in the history of the F1 World Championship. Vanwall released Moss to compete with another team and he linked up with the Rob Walker Racing Team to drive their Cooper T43, a car about to be superseded at the factory Cooper team by the new T45.

With the race set to be held in very hot conditions, as in the 1955 Argentine Grand Prix, it was shortened from 400 kilometres to 313. The shorter race led the Walker team to consider running the race without stopping for tyres. The car's four stud wheels would take the time of almost two laps to complete a four tyre change, much slower than their Ferrari and Maserati rivals with Centerlock wheels. Moss and his team began a deception, complaining about the tyre situation and how much time they would lose changing tyres.

Jean Behra in a privateer Maserati 250F led at the start but was quickly passed by Hawthorn. By lap ten Juan Manuel Fangio had taken the lead in the Scuderia Sud Americana entered Maserati 250F and Moss had worked his way forward into second position as the pitstops began for the heavier Italian built cars.

After the pitstops Moss led from Musso and Hawthorn. Behra was delayed by a spin and Fangio by a misfire. With ten laps remaining the others realized Moss was not going to pit at all, and Musso and Hawthorn picked up the pace to catch. Moss' tyres were disintegrating but there was enough with careful driving that Moss limped to the line for a remarkable victory. Behind the two Ferraris Fangio was the first Maserati to finish. Behra, two laps down, scored the remaining points. Harry Schell was next ahead of Fangio's teammate Carlos Menditeguy, both Maserati 250F mounted. Peter Collins was the only retirement of the ten entries having stopped on the opening lap with a broken axle in the third Ferrari.

It was the first F1 victory for a rear-engined car but for the moment it would be an aberration brought on by hot weather and tactics that took maximum advantage of reduced tyre wear in the better balanced mid-engine car. It was not yet obvious that the death of the front-engined F1 car was just a year away, as 1958 was the last year a driver won the World Championship with one.

== Classification ==
=== Qualifying ===
Pos	No	Driver	Constructor	Time	Gap
1	2	(Argentina) Juan Manuel Fangio	Maserati	1:42.0	
2	20	(United Kingdom) Mike Hawthorn	Ferrari	1:42.6	+0.6
3	18	(United Kingdom) Peter Collins	Ferrari	1:42.6	+0.6
4	4	(France) Jean Behra	Maserati	1:42.7	+0.7
5	16	(Italy) Luigi Musso	Ferrari	1:42.9	+0.9
6	6	(Argentina) Carlos Menditeguy	Maserati	1:43.7	+1.7
7	14	(United Kingdom) Stirling Moss	Cooper–Climax	1:44.0	+2.0
8	8	(United States) Harry Schell	Maserati	1:44.2	+2.2
9	10	(Spain) Paco Godia	Maserati	1:49.3	+7.3
10	12	(United Kingdom) Horace Gould	Maserati	1:51.7	+9.7

=== Race ===
Pos	No	Driver	Constructor	Laps	Time/Retired	Grid	Points
1	14	(United Kingdom) Stirling Moss	Cooper-Climax	80	2:19:33.7	7	8
2	16	(Italy) Luigi Musso	Ferrari	80	+2.7 secs	5	6
3	20	(United Kingdom) Mike Hawthorn	Ferrari	80	+12.6 secs	2	4
4	2	(Argentina) Juan Manuel Fangio	Maserati	80	+53.0 secs	1	4^{1}
5	4	(France) Jean Behra	Maserati	78	+2 Laps	4	2
6	8	(United States) Harry Schell	Maserati	77	+3 Laps	8	
7	6	(Argentina) Carlos Menditeguy	Maserati	76	+4 Laps	6	
8	10	(Spain) Paco Godia	Maserati	75	+5 Laps	9	
9	12	(United Kingdom) Horace Gould	Maserati	71	+9 Laps	10	
Ret	18	(United Kingdom) Peter Collins	Ferrari	0	Halfshaft	3	

Notes

- ^1 – Includes 1 point for fastest lap

== Notes ==
- This was Juan Manuel Fangio's 29th pole position, setting a new record that would only be broken by Jim Clark at the 1967 Canadian Grand Prix.
- This was Juan Manuel Fangio's 23rd fastest lap, setting a new record that equally would be broken by Jim Clark at the 1967 Dutch Grand Prix.

== Championship standings after the race ==
Drivers' Championship standings

Pos	Driver	Points
1	(United Kingdom) Stirling Moss	8
2	(Italy) Luigi Musso	6
3	(United Kingdom) Mike Hawthorn	4
4	(Argentina) Juan Manuel Fangio	4
5	(France) Jean Behra	2

Constructors' Championship standings

Pos	Constructor	Points
1	(United Kingdom) Cooper-Climax	8
2	(Italy) Ferrari	6
3	(Italy) Maserati	3

- Note: Only the top five positions are included for both sets of standings.

Previous race: 1957 Italian Grand Prix	FIA Formula One World Championship; 1958 season	Next race: 1958 Monaco Grand Prix
Previous race: 1957 Argentine Grand Prix	Argentine Grand Prix	Next race: 1960 Argentine Grand Prix
