= 1960 French Grand Prix =

← Previous race	Next race →
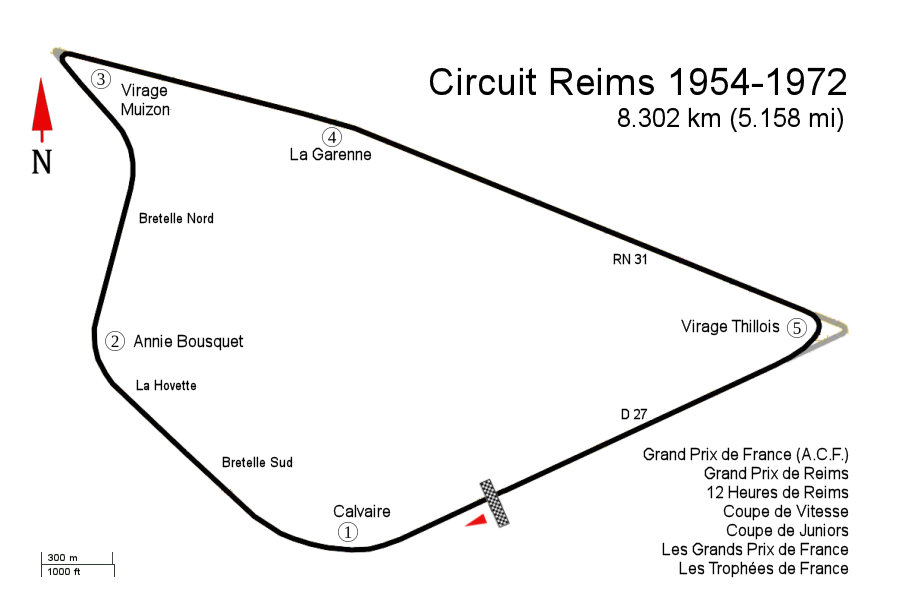
- Reims-Gueux

Race details
- Date: 3 July 1960
- Official name: XLVI Grand Prix de l'ACF
- Location: Reims-Gueux, Reims, France
- Course: Temporary road course
- Course length: 8.348 km (5.187 miles)
- Distance: 50 laps, 417.383 km (259.350 miles)
- Weather: Dry

Pole position
Driver	(Australia) Jack Brabham	Cooper-Climax
- Time: 2:16.8

Fastest lap
Driver	(Australia) Jack Brabham	Cooper-Climax
- Time: 2:17.5

Podium
First	(Australia) Jack Brabham	Cooper-Climax
Second	(Belgium) Olivier Gendebien	Cooper-Climax
Third	(New Zealand) Bruce McLaren	Cooper-Climax

The 1960 French Grand Prix was a Formula One motor race held at Reims-Gueux on 3 July 1960. It was race 6 of 10 in the 1960 World Championship of Drivers and race 5 of 9 in the 1960 International Cup for Formula One Manufacturers.

The 50-lap race was won from pole position by Australian driver Jack Brabham, driving a works Cooper-Climax. Belgian driver Olivier Gendebien finished second in a Cooper-Climax entered by the British Racing Partnership, while New Zealander Bruce McLaren was third in the other works Cooper-Climax. This was the final race for inaugural Constructors' Champions Vanwall.

== Classification ==
=== Qualifying ===
Pos	No	Driver	Constructor	Time	Gap
1	16	(Australia) Jack Brabham	Cooper-Climax	2:16.8	—
2	2	(United States) Phil Hill	Ferrari	2:18.2	+1.4
3	12	(United Kingdom) Graham Hill	BRM	2:18.4	+1.6
4	20	(United Kingdom) Innes Ireland	Lotus-Climax	2:18.5	+1.7
5	6	(Belgium) Willy Mairesse	Ferrari	2:19.3	+2.5
6	4	(Germany) Wolfgang von Trips	Ferrari	2:19.4	+2.6
7	10	(United States) Dan Gurney	BRM	2:19.4	+2.6
8	22	(United Kingdom) Ron Flockhart	Lotus-Climax	2:19.5	+2.7
9	18	(New Zealand) Bruce McLaren	Cooper-Climax	2:19.6	+2.8
10	8	(Sweden) Jo Bonnier	BRM	2:19.8	+3.0
11	44	(Belgium) Olivier Gendebien	Cooper-Climax	2:20.1	+3.3
12	24	(United Kingdom) Jim Clark	Lotus-Climax	2:20.3	+3.5
13	46	(United Kingdom) Henry Taylor	Cooper-Climax	2:22.8	+6.0
14	14	(United Kingdom) Tony Brooks	Vanwall	2:23.3	+6.5
15	36	(Belgium) Lucien Bianchi	Cooper-Climax	2:23.6	+6.8
16	48	(United Kingdom) Bruce Halford	Cooper-Climax	2:23.6	+6.8
17	40	(United States) Masten Gregory	Cooper-Maserati	2:24.3	+7.5
18	38	(France) Maurice Trintignant	Cooper-Maserati	2:24.7	+7.9
19	30	(Italy) Gino Munaron	Cooper-Castellotti	2:31.3	+14.5
20	28	(United States) Richie Ginther	Scarab	2:31.4	+14.6
21	34	(United Kingdom) David Piper	Lotus-Climax	2:32.0	+15.2
22	42	(United Kingdom) Ian Burgess	Cooper-Maserati	2:36.7	+19.9
23	26	(United States) Chuck Daigh	Scarab	2:46.1	+29.3

=== Race ===
Pos	No	Driver	Constructor	Laps	Time/Retired	Grid	Points
1	16	(Australia) Jack Brabham	Cooper-Climax	50	1:57:24.9	1	8
2	44	(Belgium) Olivier Gendebien	Cooper-Climax	50	+ 48.3	11	6
3	18	(New Zealand) Bruce McLaren	Cooper-Climax	50	+ 51.9	9	4
4	46	(United Kingdom) Henry Taylor	Cooper-Climax	49	+ 1 Lap	13	3
5	24	(United Kingdom) Jim Clark	Lotus-Climax	49	+ 1 Lap	12	2
6	22	(United Kingdom) Ron Flockhart	Lotus-Climax	49	+ 1 Lap	8	1
7	20	(United Kingdom) Innes Ireland	Lotus-Climax	43	+ 7 Laps	4	
8	48	(United Kingdom) Bruce Halford	Cooper-Climax	40	Engine	16	
9	40	(United States) Masten Gregory	Cooper-Maserati	37	+ 13 Laps	17	
10	42	(United Kingdom) Ian Burgess	Cooper-Maserati	36	+ 14 Laps	22	
11	4	(Germany) Wolfgang von Trips	Ferrari	30	Transmission	6	
12	2	(United States) Phil Hill	Ferrari	29	Transmission	2	
Ret	8	(Sweden) Jo Bonnier	BRM	22	Engine	10	
Ret	36	(Belgium) Lucien Bianchi	Cooper-Climax	18	Transmission	15	
Ret	10	(United States) Dan Gurney	BRM	17	Engine	7	
Ret	30	(Italy) Gino Munaron	Cooper-Castellotti	16	Transmission	19	
Ret	6	(Belgium) Willy Mairesse	Ferrari	14	Transmission	5	
Ret	14	(United Kingdom) Tony Brooks	Vanwall	7	Vibration	14	
Ret	12	(United Kingdom) Graham Hill	BRM	0	Accident	3	
Ret	38	(France) Maurice Trintignant	Cooper-Maserati	0	Accident	18	
DNS	28	(United States) Richie Ginther	Scarab		Engine	20	
DNS	34	(United Kingdom) David Piper	Lotus-Climax		Engine	21	
DNS	26	(United States) Chuck Daigh	Scarab		Engine	23	

== Championship standings after the race ==
Drivers' Championship standings

	Pos	Driver	Points
1	1	(Australia) Jack Brabham	24
1	2	(New Zealand) Bruce McLaren	24
	3	(United Kingdom) Stirling Moss	11
7	4	(Belgium) Olivier Gendebien	10
1	5	(United States) Jim Rathmann	8

Constructors' Championship standings

Pos	Constructor	Points
1	(United Kingdom) Cooper-Climax	38
2	(United Kingdom) Lotus-Climax	19
3	(Italy) Ferrari	15
4	(United Kingdom) BRM	6
5	(United Kingdom) Cooper-Maserati	3

- Note: Only the top five positions are included for both sets of standings.

Previous race: 1960 Belgian Grand Prix	FIA Formula One World Championship; 1960 season	Next race: 1960 British Grand Prix
Previous race: 1959 French Grand Prix	French Grand Prix	Next race: 1961 French Grand Prix
