= Connaught Type B =

Formula One car (1955–1958)

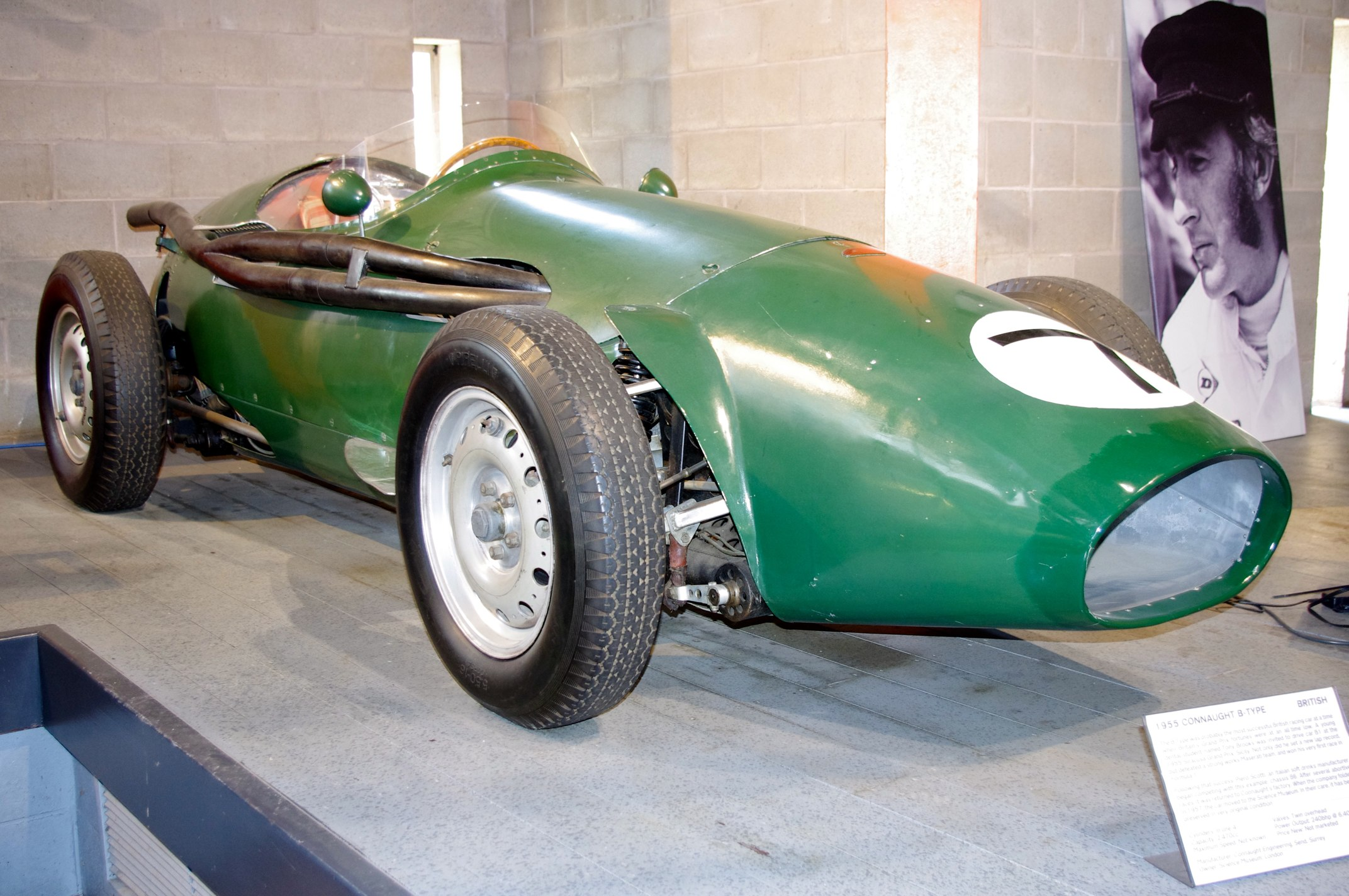
- Category: Formula One
- Constructor: Connaught Engineering
- Designers: Mike Oliver; Rodney Clarke
- Predecessor: Connaught Type A
- Successor: Connaught Type C

Technical specifications
- Chassis: tubular ladder chassis supporting spaceframe with aluminium bodywork
- Suspension (front): Independent double wishbones with coilover shock-absorbers
- Suspension (rear): De Dion tube, torsion bars
- Engine: Alta 2,470 cc (150.7 cu in) straight 4 naturally aspirated, front engine, longitudinally mounted
- Transmission: 4 speed manual preselector gearbox
- Tyres: D

Competition history
- Notable entrants: Connaught Engineering
- Notable drivers: (United Kingdom) Tony Brooks (United Kingdom) Jack Fairman, (United Kingdom) Ron Flockhart
- Debut: 1955 British Grand Prix
- Last event: 1958 British Grand Prix
Races	Wins	Poles	F/Laps
7	0	0	0
- Constructors' Championships: 0 (Note that the Constructors' Championship was first awarded in 1958)
- Drivers' Championships: 0
- Unless otherwise stated, all data refer to Formula One World Championship Grands Prix only.

The Connaught Type B was a racing car made by Connaught Engineering of England used in Formula One racing between 1955 and 1958. Although not a success in the Formula One World Championship, it became the first British car since 1924 to win a Continental European motor race when Tony Brooks won the non-championship 1955 Syracuse Grand Prix.

== Development history ==
Connaught had intended to build a streamlined Grand Prix car based around the 2.5-litre Coventry Climax FPE 'Godiva' engine. When that project was abandoned, Connaught instead switched to using the Alta straight 4 engine. The streamliner design was rejected as impractical, the drivers complaining of similar problems to that of the Mercedes-Benz W196 streamliner, in that they were unable to place the car accurately at the apex of bends. It was replaced by more conventional bodywork, close-fitting and streamlined.

Seven Type B chassis were built between 1954 and 1958. All had a conventional space frame body on a tubular chassis independent suspension with wishbones and torsion bars at the front and a de Dion axle at the rear. Disk brakes were fitted all round. The cars were powered by Alta 2.5-litre four-cylinder engines that delivered 250 bhp through a four-speed preselector gearbox.

== Race history ==
The Type B made its debut at the 1955 Glover Trophy, where Tony Rolt qualified fifth but retired after eight laps with a faulty fuel pump. Thereafter the new car struggled to compete against the Maserati 250F and Vanwall competition. In its debut World Championship appearance at the 1955 British Grand Prix all five entries failed to finish the race. Disheartened, owner Kenneth McAlpine considered winding up the team, but the lure of substantial starting money from the organisers of the 1955 Syracuse Grand Prix led to two cars being entered, to be driven by Tony Brooks and Les Leston. Against all expectations Brooks won the race by 50 seconds from the works Maserati 250F of Luigi Musso. It was the first victory on a Continental European race track since Henry Segrave won the 1924 San Sebastián Grand Prix in a Sunbeam.

However, the Syracuse result proved to be the exception rather than the rule, with the cash-strapped team generally struggling to compete against the Maserati 250F and Vanwall opposition. A limited World Championship programme, just five races over the next three seasons, yielded a best place of third for Ron Flockhart at the 1956 Italian Grand Prix. In national UK events it was slightly more successful, with Archie Scott Brown winning the 1956 BRSCC Formula 1 Race and Stuart Lewis-Evans winning the 1957 Glover Trophy.

In its final World Championship race, with the team now being run by Bernie Ecclestone, both cars retired from the 1958 British Grand Prix.
