= 1957 British Grand Prix =

← Previous race	Next race →

Race details
- Date: 20 July 1957
- Official name: Grand Prix d'Europe incorporating the 10th RAC British Grand Prix
- Location: Aintree Circuit, Liverpool, England
- Course: Permanent racing facility
- Course length: 4.828 km (3.000 miles)
- Distance: 90 laps, 434.52 km (270.00 miles)
- Weather: Overcast, dry.

Pole position
Driver	(United Kingdom) Stirling Moss	Vanwall
- Time: 2:00.2

Fastest lap
Driver	(United Kingdom) Stirling Moss	Vanwall
- Time: 1:59.2

Podium
First	(United Kingdom) Stirling Moss; (United Kingdom) Tony Brooks	Vanwall
Second	(Italy) Luigi Musso	Ferrari
Third	(United Kingdom) Mike Hawthorn	Ferrari

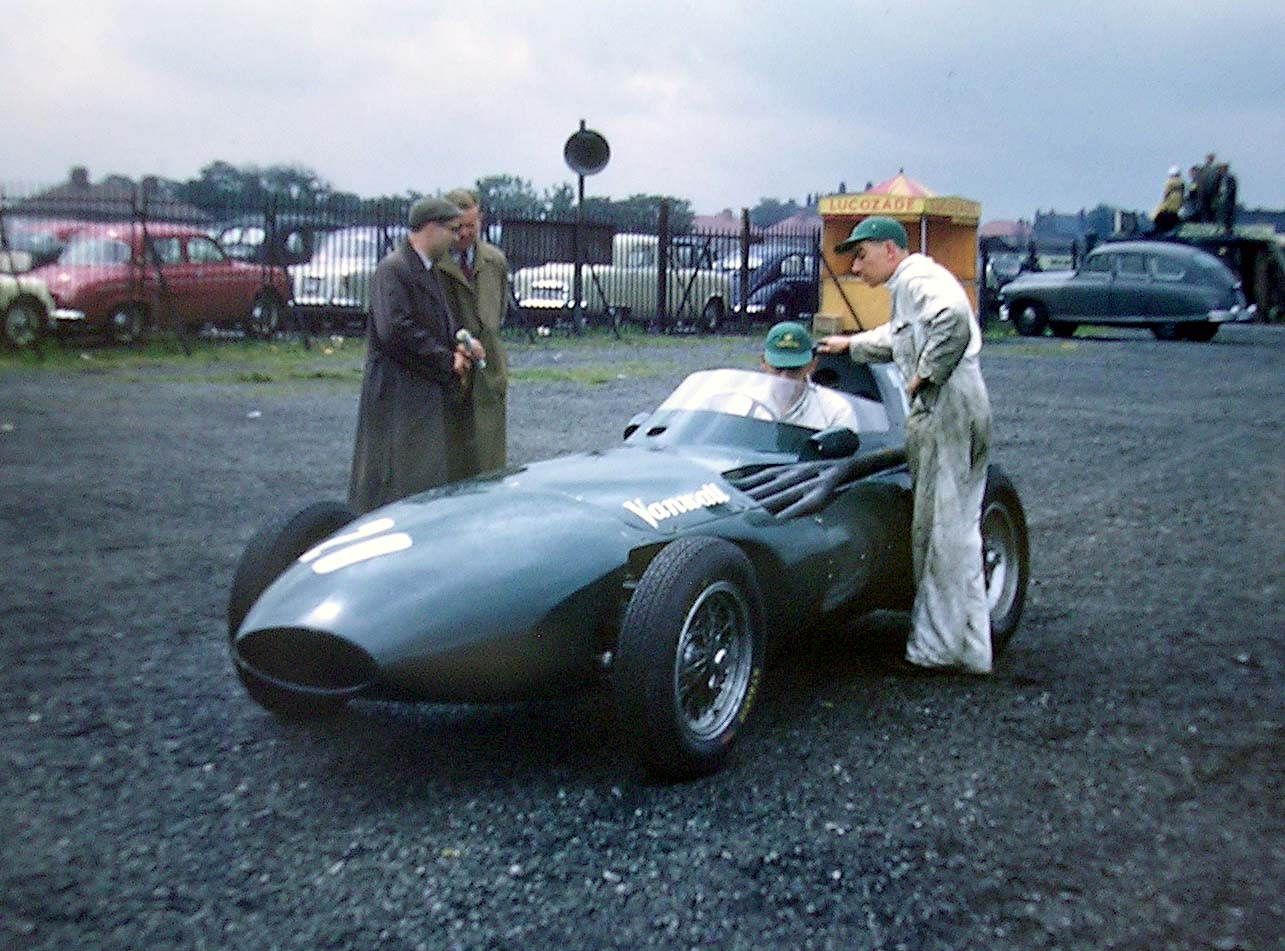
The winning Vanwall, VW5, before the start of the race. It was shared by Tony Brooks and Stirling Moss, who both played a part in scoring the constructor's first Formula One win.

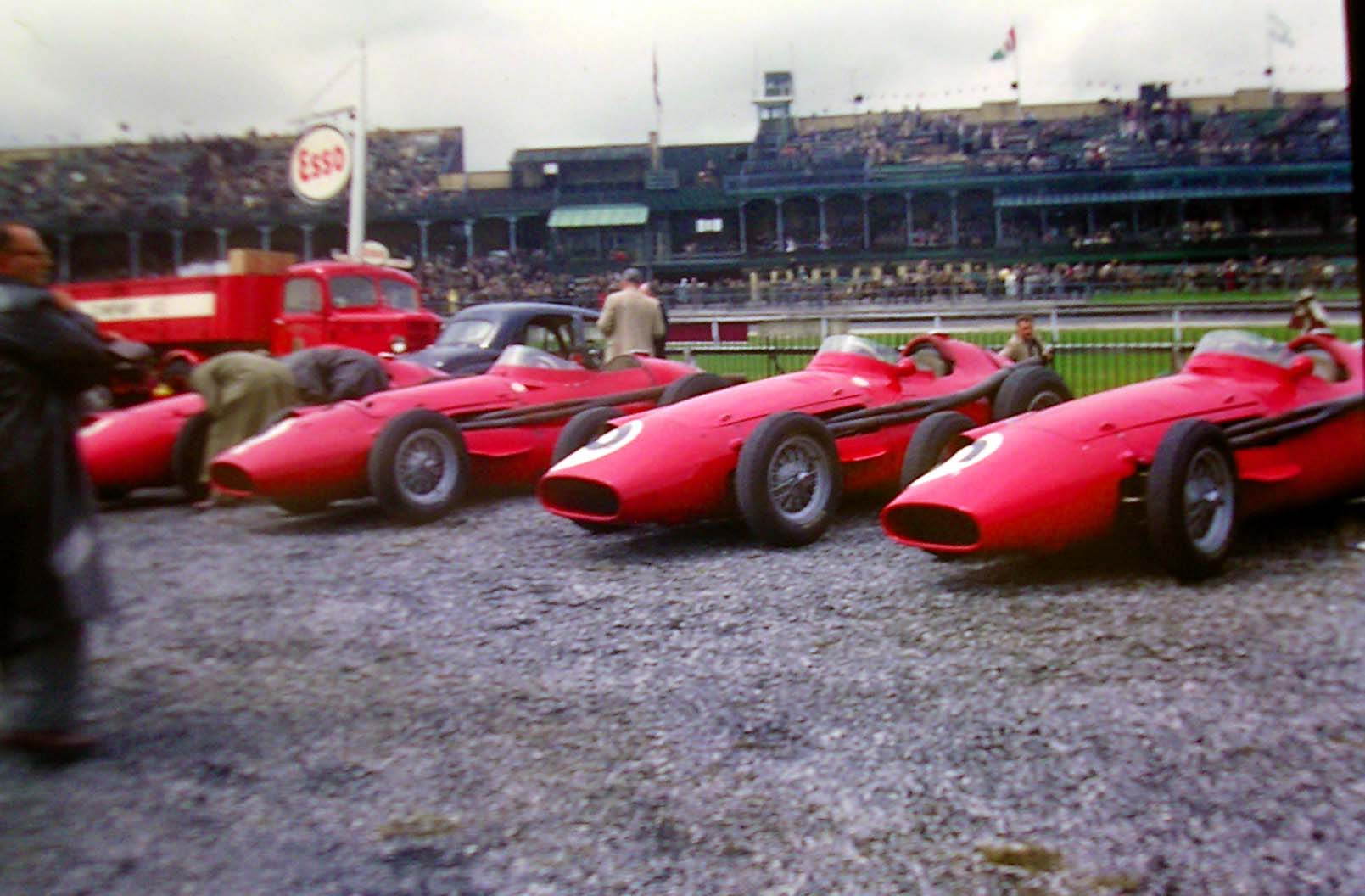
All but one of the Maserati 250Fs retired from the race.

The 1957 British Grand Prix was a Formula One motor race held on 20 July 1957 at the Aintree Circuit, near Liverpool. It was the tenth British Grand Prix and it was race 5 of 8 in the 1957 World Championship of Drivers. The race was won by Stirling Moss and Tony Brooks, who shared driving duties in a Vanwall. It was the third and final time that a Grand Prix had been won by two drivers in a shared car. This race was also noted as the first occasion that a British constructor won a World Drivers' Championship race, and from this season onwards British constructors won races in every season until 2013, except 2006.

== Classification ==
=== Qualifying ===
Pos	No	Driver	Constructor	Time	Gap
1	18	(United Kingdom) Stirling Moss	Vanwall	2:00.2	—
2	4	(France) Jean Behra	Maserati	2:00.4	+0.2
3	20	(United Kingdom) Tony Brooks	Vanwall	2:00.4	+0.2
4	2	(Argentina) Juan Manuel Fangio	Maserati	2:00.6	+0.4
5	10	(United Kingdom) Mike Hawthorn	Ferrari	2:01.2	+1.0
6	22	(United Kingdom) Stuart Lewis-Evans	Vanwall	2:01.2	+1.0
7	6	(United States) Harry Schell	Maserati	2:01.4	+1.2
8	12	(United Kingdom) Peter Collins	Ferrari	2:01.8	+1.6
9	16	(France) Maurice Trintignant	Ferrari	2:03.2	+3.0
10	14	(Italy) Luigi Musso	Ferrari	2:03.4	+3.2
11	8	(Argentina) Carlos Menditeguy	Maserati	2:05.4	+5.2
12	26	(United Kingdom) Les Leston	BRM	2:05.6	+5.4
13	34	(Australia) Jack Brabham	Cooper-Climax	2:07.0	+6.8
14	30	(United Kingdom) Horace Gould	Maserati	2:07.0	+6.8
15	36	(United Kingdom) Roy Salvadori	Cooper-Climax	2:07.4	+7.2
16	24	(United Kingdom) Jack Fairman	BRM	2:08.6	+8.4
17	28	(Sweden) Jo Bonnier	Maserati	2:12.6	+12.4
18	38	(United Kingdom) Bob Gerard	Cooper-Bristol	2:12.6	+12.4
19	32	(United Kingdom) Ivor Bueb	Maserati	2:15.4	+15.2

=== Race ===
Pos	No	Driver	Constructor	Laps	Time/Retired	Grid	Points
1	20	(United Kingdom) Tony Brooks (United Kingdom) Stirling Moss	Vanwall	90	3:06:37.8	3	4; 5^{1}
2	14	(Italy) Luigi Musso	Ferrari	90	+25.6	10	6
3	10	(United Kingdom) Mike Hawthorn	Ferrari	90	+42.8	5	4
4	16	(France) Maurice Trintignant (United Kingdom) Peter Collins	Ferrari	88	+2 laps	9	3^{2} 0^{2}
5	36	(United Kingdom) Roy Salvadori	Cooper-Climax	85	+5 laps	15	2
6	38	(United Kingdom) Bob Gerard	Cooper-Bristol	82	+8 laps	18	
7	22	(United Kingdom) Stuart Lewis-Evans	Vanwall	82	+8 laps	6	
8	32	(United Kingdom) Ivor Bueb	Maserati	71	+19 laps	19	
Ret	34	(Australia) Jack Brabham	Cooper-Climax	74	Clutch	13	
Ret	4	(France) Jean Behra	Maserati	69	Clutch	2	
Ret	12	(United Kingdom) Peter Collins	Ferrari	53	Water leak	8	
Ret	18	(United Kingdom) Stirling Moss (United Kingdom) Tony Brooks	Vanwall	51	Engine	1	
Ret	2	(Argentina) Juan Manuel Fangio	Maserati	49	Engine	4	
Ret	24	(United Kingdom) Jack Fairman	BRM	46	Engine	16	
Ret	26	(United Kingdom) Les Leston	BRM	44	Engine	12	
Ret	6	(United States) Harry Schell	Maserati	39	Water pump	7	
Ret	8	(Argentina) Carlos Menditeguy	Maserati	35	Transmission	11	
Ret	28	(Sweden) Jo Bonnier	Maserati	18	Gearbox	17	
DNS	30	(United Kingdom) Horace Gould	Maserati		Accident	14	

Notes

- ^1 – Includes 1 point for fastest lap
- ^2 – Trintignant received all 3 points for fourth place as it was determined that Collins did not drive a significant number of laps

== Notes ==
- This was the 50th World Championship Formula One race for a Maserati.
- It was the first World Championship pole position, fastest lap, and win and Grand Slam for Vanwall (both as a constructor and as an engine supplier) and the first World Championship pole position, fastest lap and win for a British constructor and for a car powered by a British engine.

== Shared drives ==
  - Car #20: Tony Brooks (26 laps) and Stirling Moss (64 laps). They shared the 8 points for first place
  - Car #16: Maurice Trintignant (85 laps) and Peter Collins (3 laps). Trintignant received all 3 points for fourth place as it was determined that Collins did not drive a significant number of laps.
  - Car #18: Stirling Moss (25 laps) and Tony Brooks (26 laps).

== Championship standings after the race ==
Drivers' Championship standings

	Pos	Driver	Points
	1	(Argentina) Juan Manuel Fangio	25
1	2	(Italy) Luigi Musso	13
3	3	(United Kingdom) Tony Brooks	10
2	4	(United States) Sam Hanks	8
1	5	(United States) Jim Rathmann	7

- Note: Only the top five positions are included.

Previous race: 1957 French Grand Prix	FIA Formula One World Championship; 1957 season	Next race: 1957 German Grand Prix
Previous race: 1956 British Grand Prix	British Grand Prix	Next race: 1958 British Grand Prix
Previous race: 1956 Italian Grand Prix	European Grand Prix (Designated European Grand Prix)	Next race: 1958 Belgian Grand Prix
