= Dick Gibson (racing driver) =

British racing driver (1918–2010)

- Born: 16 April 1918; Bourne, Lincolnshire, England
- Died: 17 December 2010 (aged 92); Cádiz, Spain

Formula One World Championship career
- Nationality: (United Kingdom) British
- Active years: 1957–1958
- Team: Cooper
- Entries: 2
- Championships: 0
- Wins: 0
- Podiums: 0
- Career points: 0
- Pole positions: 0
- Fastest laps: 0
- First entry: 1957 German Grand Prix
- Last entry: 1958 German Grand Prix

Richard Gibson (16 April 1918 – 17 December 2010) was a racing driver from England. He participated in two World Championship Formula One Grands Prix, debuting in 1957. He scored no championship points. He also participated in numerous non-Championship Formula One races.

== Complete Formula One World Championship results ==
(key)

Year	Entrant	Chassis	Engine	1	2	3	4	5	6	7	8	9	10	11	WDC	Points
1957	R Gibson	Cooper T43 (F2)	Climax S4	ARG	MON	500	FRA	GBR	GER; Ret	PES	ITA				NC	0
1958	R Gibson	Cooper T43 (F2)	Climax S4	ARG	MON	NED	500	BEL	FRA	GBR	GER; Ret	POR	ITA	MOR	NC	0
