= Bruce Halford =

British racing driver (1931–2001)

- Born: 18 May 1931; Hampton in Arden, Warwickshire, England
- Died: 2 December 2001 (aged 70); Churston Ferrers, Devon, England

Formula One World Championship career
- Nationality: (United Kingdom) British
- Active years: 1956 – 1957, 1959 – 1960
- Team(s): non-works Maserati, Lotus, and Cooper
- Entries: 9 (8 starts)
- Championships: 0
- Wins: 0
- Podiums: 0
- Career points: 0
- Pole positions: 0
- Fastest laps: 0
- First entry: 1956 British Grand Prix
- Last entry: 1960 French Grand Prix

Bruce Henley Halford (18 May 1931 – 2 December 2001) was a British racing driver from England. He was born in Hampton-in-Arden (then in Warwickshire) and educated at Blundell's School.

Halford drove in Formula One from 1956 to 1960, participating in nine World Championship Grands Prix and numerous non-Championship races.

Halford died in Churston Ferrers, Devon. Halford's obituary in The Daily Telegraph described him as "one of the last of the 1950s' select band of private-entrant owner-drivers from the heyday of the classical front-engined Grand Prix car."

== Complete Formula One World Championship results ==
(key)

Year	Entrant	Chassis	Engine	1	2	3	4	5	6	7	8	9	10	WDC	Points
1956	Bruce Halford	Maserati 250F	Maserati Straight-6	ARG	MON	500	BEL	FRA	GBR; Ret	GER; DSQ	ITA; Ret			NC	0
1957	Bruce Halford	Maserati 250F	Maserati Straight-6	ARG	MON	500	FRA	GBR	GER; 11	PES; Ret	ITA; Ret			NC	0
1959	John Fisher	Lotus 16	Climax Straight-4	MON; Ret	500	NED	FRA	GBR	GER	POR	ITA	USA		NC	0
1960	Fred Tuck Cars	Cooper T45	Climax Straight-4	ARG	MON; DNQ	500	NED	BEL						NC	0
1960	Yeoman Credit Racing Team	Cooper T51	Climax Straight-4						FRA; 8	GBR	POR	ITA	USA	NC	0
