= Horace Gould =

British racing driver (1921–1968)

- Born: 20 September 1921; Clifton, Bristol, England
- Died: 4 November 1968 (aged 47); Southmead, Bristol, England

Formula One World Championship career
- Nationality: (United Kingdom) British
- Active years: 1954 – 1958, 1960
- Team(s): privateer Cooper, Maserati inc. privateer
- Entries: 18 (14 starts)
- Championships: 0
- Wins: 0
- Podiums: 0
- Career points: 2
- Pole positions: 0
- Fastest laps: 0
- First entry: 1954 British Grand Prix
- Last entry: 1960 Italian Grand Prix

Horace Gould (born Horace Harry Twigg 20 September 1921 – 4 November 1968) was a British racing driver from Bristol.

== Career ==
Known for his portly frame and larger-than-life character, Gould began racing sports cars in 1952 at the wheel of a Cooper-MG. He moved into Formula One in 1954, competing as a privateer and using the team name Gould's Garage (Bristol).

In a period when fat Italians regularly occupied the cockpits of Formula 1 cars, to Horace Gould it seemed quite reasonable that a fat Bristolian should do the same.

— The Guinness Complete Grand Prix Who's Who

Gould participated in 17 Formula One World Championship Grands Prix, debuting on 17 July 1954, plus numerous non-Championship races. He scored a total of two championship points, thanks to driving his Maserati 250F to fifth place in the 1956 British Grand Prix, enough to earn him joint 19th place in that season's World Championship. He won minor non-championship Formula One races at Castle Combe in 1954 and Aintree in 1956, and also won two points in the 1957 World Sportscar Championship, finishing in fifth place in that season's 1000km of Nürburgring, sharing a Maserati 300S with teammates Stirling Moss, Juan Manuel Fangio and Chico Godia.

Although most of Gould's career was spent in England, he also had spells living and racing in New Zealand and Modena, Italy, home of the Maserati factory.

The similarity of Gould's build and driving style to those of José Froilán González led to him being dubbed "the Gonzalez of the West Country".

Gould died suddenly, in Southmead, Bristol, of a cerebral haemorrhage, at the age of 47. His sons Martin, Stephen and Richard still live in Bristol. Martin went into motor racing and raced in Formula 3, and two of his grandchildren Daniel Gould and James Gould also had careers at a young age in motorsport.

== Complete Formula One World Championship Results ==
(key)

Year	Entrant	Chassis	Engine	1	2	3	4	5	6	7	8	9	10	11	WDC	Points
1954	Goulds' Garage (Bristol)	Cooper T23	Bristol Straight-6	ARG	500	BEL	FRA	GBR; 15	GER	SUI	ITA	ESP			NC	0
1955	Goulds' Garage (Bristol)	Maserati 250F	Maserati Straight-6	ARG	MON	500	BEL	NED; Ret	GBR; Ret						NC	0
1955	Officine Alfieri Maserati	Maserati 250F	Maserati Straight-6							ITA; Ret					NC	0
1956	Goulds' Garage (Bristol)	Maserati 250F	Maserati Straight-6	ARG	MON; 8	500	BEL; Ret	FRA; DNA	GBR; 5	GER; Ret	ITA				19th	2
1957	H H Gould	Maserati 250F	Maserati Straight-6	ARG	MON; Ret	500	FRA; Ret	GBR; DNS	GER; Ret	PES; Ret	ITA; 10				NC	0
1958	H H Gould	Maserati 250F	Maserati Straight-6	ARG; 9	MON; DNQ	NED; DNS	500	BEL	FRA	GBR	GER	POR	ITA	MOR	NC	0
1960	H H Gould	Maserati 250F	Maserati Straight-6	ARG	MON	500	NED	BEL	FRA	GBR	POR	ITA; DNS	USA		NC	0
