= BRM 4-cylinder engine =

Series of Formula One racing engines

BRM 255 BRM 258 BRM 259

Overview
- Manufacturer: (United Kingdom) British Racing Motors
- Production: 1956–1960

Layout
- Configuration: L4
- Displacement: 2.5 L (153 cu in)
- Cylinder bore: 4.05 in (103 mm)
- Piston stroke: 2.95 in (75 mm)
- Valvetrain: 8-valve, DOHC, two-valves per cylinder

Combustion
- Fuel system: Carburetor
- Fuel type: Gasoline
- Oil system: Dry sump

Output
- Power output: 260–285 hp (194–213 kW)
- Torque output: 205 lb⋅ft (278 N⋅m)

The BRM 4-cylinder engines are a series of four-stroke, naturally-aspirated, 2.5 L (150 cu in), inline-four Formula One racing engines, designed, developed and built by British Racing Motors, between 1956 and 1960. They were exclusively used by BRM; and powered the BRM team cars. It was constructed to conform the FIA engine requirements; necessitating a 2.5 L naturally-aspirated engine displacement formula. The power output for these motors were between 260–285 hp (194–213 kW), and 205 lb⋅ft (278 N⋅m).

== Applications ==
- BRM P25
- BRM P48

== Formula One Championship results ==
Year	Entrant	Chassis	Engine	Tyres	Drivers	1	2	3	4	5	6	7	8	9	10	11	Points	WCC
1956	Owen Racing Organisation	BRM P25	BRM P25 2.5 L4	D		ARG	MON	500	BEL	FRA	GBR	GER	ITA				n/a	n/a
1956	Owen Racing Organisation	BRM P25	BRM P25 2.5 L4	D	Mike Hawthorn		DNS				Ret						n/a	n/a
1956	Owen Racing Organisation	BRM P25	BRM P25 2.5 L4	D	Tony Brooks		DNS				Ret						n/a	n/a
1956	Owen Racing Organisation	BRM P25	BRM P25 2.5 L4	D	Ron Flockhart						Ret						n/a	n/a
1957	Owen Racing Organisation	BRM P25	BRM P25 2.5 L4	D		ARG	MON	500	FRA	GBR	GER	PES	ITA				n/a*	n/a*
1957	Owen Racing Organisation	BRM P25	BRM P25 2.5 L4	D	Ron Flockhart		Ret		Ret								n/a*	n/a*
1957	Owen Racing Organisation	BRM P25	BRM P25 2.5 L4	D	Roy Salvadori		DNQ										n/a*	n/a*
1957	Owen Racing Organisation	BRM P25	BRM P25 2.5 L4	D	Herbert MacKay-Fraser				Ret								n/a*	n/a*
1957	Owen Racing Organisation	BRM P25	BRM P25 2.5 L4	D	Jack Fairman					Ret							n/a*	n/a*
1957	Owen Racing Organisation	BRM P25	BRM P25 2.5 L4	D	Les Leston					Ret							n/a*	n/a*
1958	Owen Racing Organisation	BRM P25	BRM P25 2.5 L4	D		ARG	MON	NED	500	BEL	FRA	GBR	GER	POR	ITA	MOR	18	4th
1958	Owen Racing Organisation	BRM P25	BRM P25 2.5 L4	D	Harry Schell		5	2		5	Ret	5	Ret	6	Ret	Ret	18	4th
1958	Owen Racing Organisation	BRM P25	BRM P25 2.5 L4	D	Jean Behra		Ret	3		Ret	Ret	Ret	Ret	4	Ret	Ret	18	4th
1958	Owen Racing Organisation	BRM P25	BRM P25 2.5 L4	D	Maurice Trintignant						Ret						18	4th
1958	Owen Racing Organisation	BRM P25	BRM P25 2.5 L4	D	Joakim Bonnier										Ret	4	18	4th
1958	Owen Racing Organisation	BRM P25	BRM P25 2.5 L4	D	Ron Flockhart											Ret	18	4th
1959	Owen Racing Organisation	BRM P25	BRM P25 2.5 L4	D		MON	500	NED	FRA	GBR	GER	POR	ITA	USA			18	3rd
1959	Owen Racing Organisation	BRM P25	BRM P25 2.5 L4	D	Harry Schell	Ret		Ret	7	4	7	5	7				18	3rd
1959	Owen Racing Organisation	BRM P25	BRM P25 2.5 L4	D	Ron Flockhart	Ret			6	Ret		7	13				18	3rd
1959	Owen Racing Organisation	BRM P25	BRM P25 2.5 L4	D	Joakim Bonnier	Ret		1	Ret	Ret	5	Ret	8				18	3rd
1959	British Racing Partnership	BRM P25	BRM P25 2.5 L4	D	Stirling Moss				DSQ	2							18	3rd
1959	British Racing Partnership	BRM P25	BRM P25 2.5 L4	D	Hans Herrmann						Ret						18	3rd
1960	Owen Racing Organisation	BRM P25; BRM P48	BRM P25 2.5 L4	D		ARG	MON	500	NED	BEL	FRA	GBR	POR	ITA	USA		8	4th
1960	Owen Racing Organisation	BRM P25; BRM P48	BRM P25 2.5 L4	D	Graham Hill	Ret	7		3	Ret	Ret	Ret	Ret		Ret		8	4th
1960	Owen Racing Organisation	BRM P25; BRM P48	BRM P25 2.5 L4	D	Joakim Bonnier	7	5		Ret	Ret	Ret	Ret	Ret		5		8	4th
1960	Owen Racing Organisation	BRM P25; BRM P48	BRM P25 2.5 L4	D	Dan Gurney		NC		Ret	Ret	Ret	10	Ret		Ret		8	4th
