= BRM P48 =

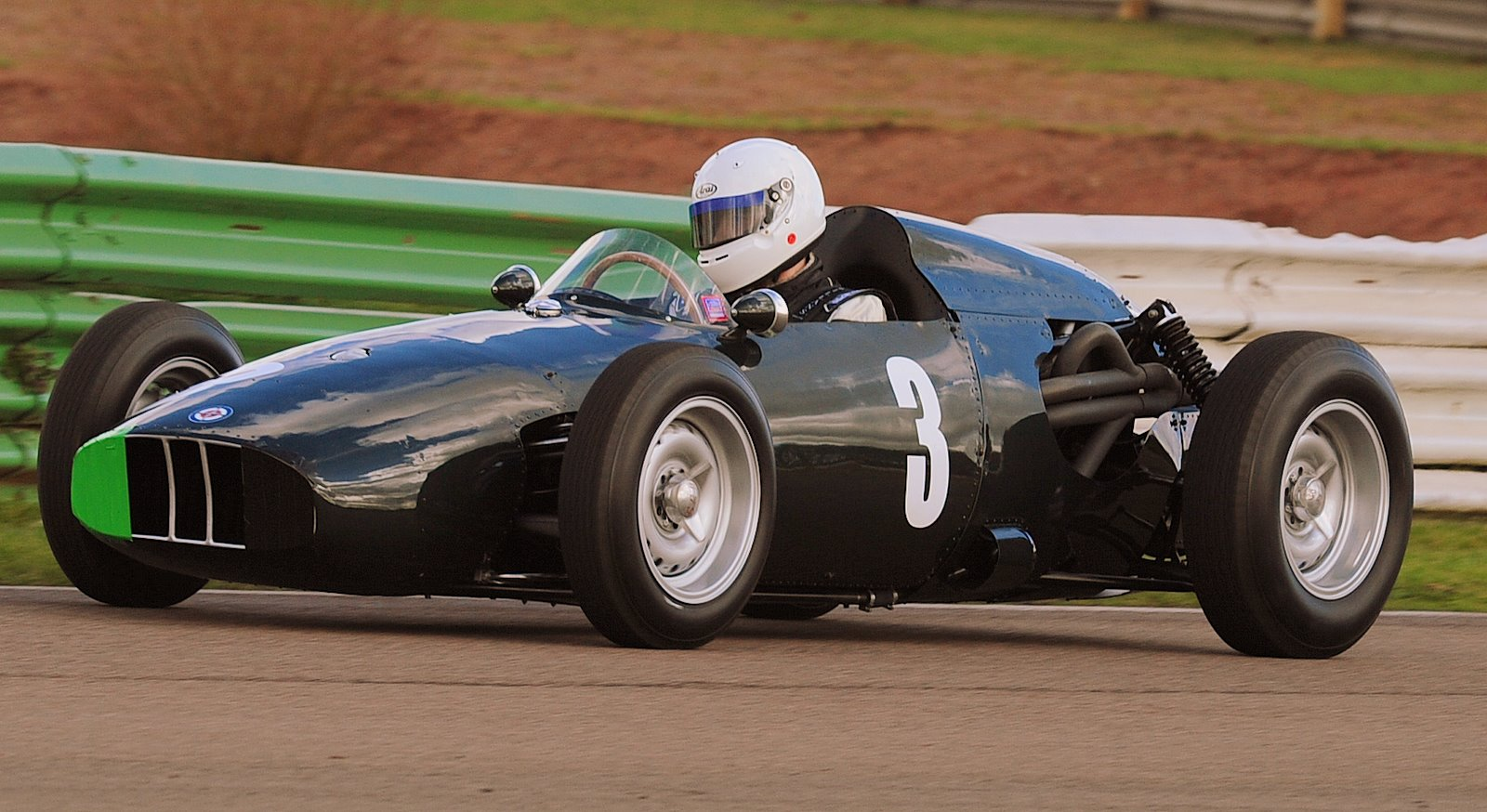
- Category: Formula One
- Constructor: British Racing Motors
- Designer: Stewart Tresilian
- Predecessor: P25
- Successor: P57 Climax

Technical specifications
- Chassis: Steel ladder frame
- Suspension (front): double wishbones, coil springs over dampers, anti-roll bar
- Suspension (rear): double wishbones, coil springs over dampers, anti-roll bar
- Wheelbase: 90 in (228.6 cm)
- Engine: British Racing Motors 25 2,491 cc (152.0 cu in) S4 N/A, rear-mounted.
- Transmission: British Racing Motors 4-speed transverse shaft. ZF differential.
- Weight: 1,102 lb (499.9 kg) (Unladen)
- Fuel: Petrol/alcohol mix.
- Tyres: Dunlop.

Competition history
- Notable entrants: Owen Racing Organisation
- Notable drivers: (United Kingdom) Graham Hill (United States) Harry Schell (Sweden) Joakim Bonnier (United States) Dan Gurney
- Debut: 1960 Monaco Grand Prix
Races	Wins	Poles	F/Laps
7	0	0	1

The BRM P48 was a Formula One racing car raced in 1960. It was BRM's first rear-engined car. With rear-engined cars in the ascendancy, BRM hastily reworked the front-engined, now five-year-old P25. The car proved to be slow and unreliable, and was replaced by the P48/57 the following year.

== Development ==
Aside from the placement of the driver and engine, the P48 was mechanically the same as the outgoing P25. It featured the same 2.5 litre straight-4 engine producing 275 horsepower. The P48 also featured a single brake disc at the rear mounted directly to the gearbox. The rear bodywork was cut off to aid cooling, which exposed the unlovingly nicknamed "bacon slicer" rear brake.

During 1960 Tony Rudd designed his Mark II version of the car, with a conventional 2 disc rear brake layout, simple rear wishbone suspension and a much lower profile. This resulted in a much better handling car, and for the 1961 Formula One season BRM based their chassis designs on the Mark II.

== Racing record ==
For 1960, BRM campaigned three P48s for Joakim Bonnier, Graham Hill, and Dan Gurney. The P48 debuted in the second race of the season, the Monaco Grand Prix. To the surprise of everyone, including the team, all three cars finished. Bonnier scored points for fifth. However, this proved to be a false hope, as each driver finished only once more. At the Dutch Grand Prix, Hill finished a respectable third behind the Coventry Climax engined Cooper and Lotus of Jack Brabham and Innes Ireland. Sadly, Gurney's rear brake failed on the entry to Zandvoort's first hairpin; his BRM rolled into the stands, killing one spectator and injuring several others. After the Zandvoort disaster, BRM scored just once more with Bonnier in the United States Grand Prix. BRM finished the season with a disappointing 8 points.

The Mark II cars were raced in the 1961 Intercontinental Formula races.

Dan Gurney won the 1961 Victorian Trophy at the Ballarat Air Strip circuit in Victoria, Australia driving a P48.

== Complete Formula One World Championship results ==
Year	Entrant	Engine	Tyres	Drivers	1	2	3	4	5	6	7	8	9	10	Points	WCC
1960	Owen Racing Organisation	BRM P25 2.5 L4	D		ARG	MON	500	NED	BEL	FRA	GBR	POR	ITA	USA	8	4th
1960	Owen Racing Organisation	BRM P25 2.5 L4	D	Graham Hill		7		3	Ret	Ret	Ret	Ret		Ret	8	4th
1960	Owen Racing Organisation	BRM P25 2.5 L4	D	Joakim Bonnier		5		Ret	Ret	Ret	Ret	Ret		5	8	4th
1960	Owen Racing Organisation	BRM P25 2.5 L4	D	Dan Gurney		NC		Ret	Ret	Ret	10	Ret		Ret	8	4th
