= Stewart Tresilian =

British mechanical engineer (1904–1962)

Stewart Tresilian (9 January 1904 – 20 May 1962) was a British mechanical engineer, who played a significant role in the early development of British aero engines during World War II.

== Early life ==
He gained a BA degree in engineering from the University of Cambridge.

== Career ==
=== Rolls-Royce ===
In the 1920s he worked at Rolls-Royce on aero-engines. In the early 1930s he worked as the chief assistant to Arthur Rowledge at Rolls-Royce on the R engine.

=== Lagonda ===
In 1936 Tresilian was invited by W.O. Bentley to follow him from Rolls Royce to Lagonda to become chief designer. The V12 Lagonda Tresillian designed followed the general principles he had set out at Rolls Royce for a new but unbuilt version of the Phantom III. Despite a lack of funding and development the V12 Lagonda was a great success.

=== Templewood Engineering ===
For around a year, from 1938 to 1939, he worked as an independent consultant under the name 'Templewood Engineering', an owned subsidiary of High Duty Alloys Ltd. Wallace C. Devereux set up this offshoot company in order to market their Hiduminium range of high-performance aluminium alloys to the motor-racing industry. One of Tresilian's innovations was to encourage the use of these alloys as extrusions, as well as the previous forgings.

=== Armstrong Siddeley ===
In 1939 he became the Chief Engineer of Armstrong Siddeley, based north of Coventry (now Rolls-Royce Ansty).

=== British Racing Motors ===
Tresilian designed an oversquare twin-cam 2.5-litre four-cylinder for the BRM P25 Formula One car. Tresilian subsequently designed the BRM P48, BRM's first rear-engined Formula One car.
