= Rear mid-engine, rear-wheel-drive layout =

Car layout in automotive design

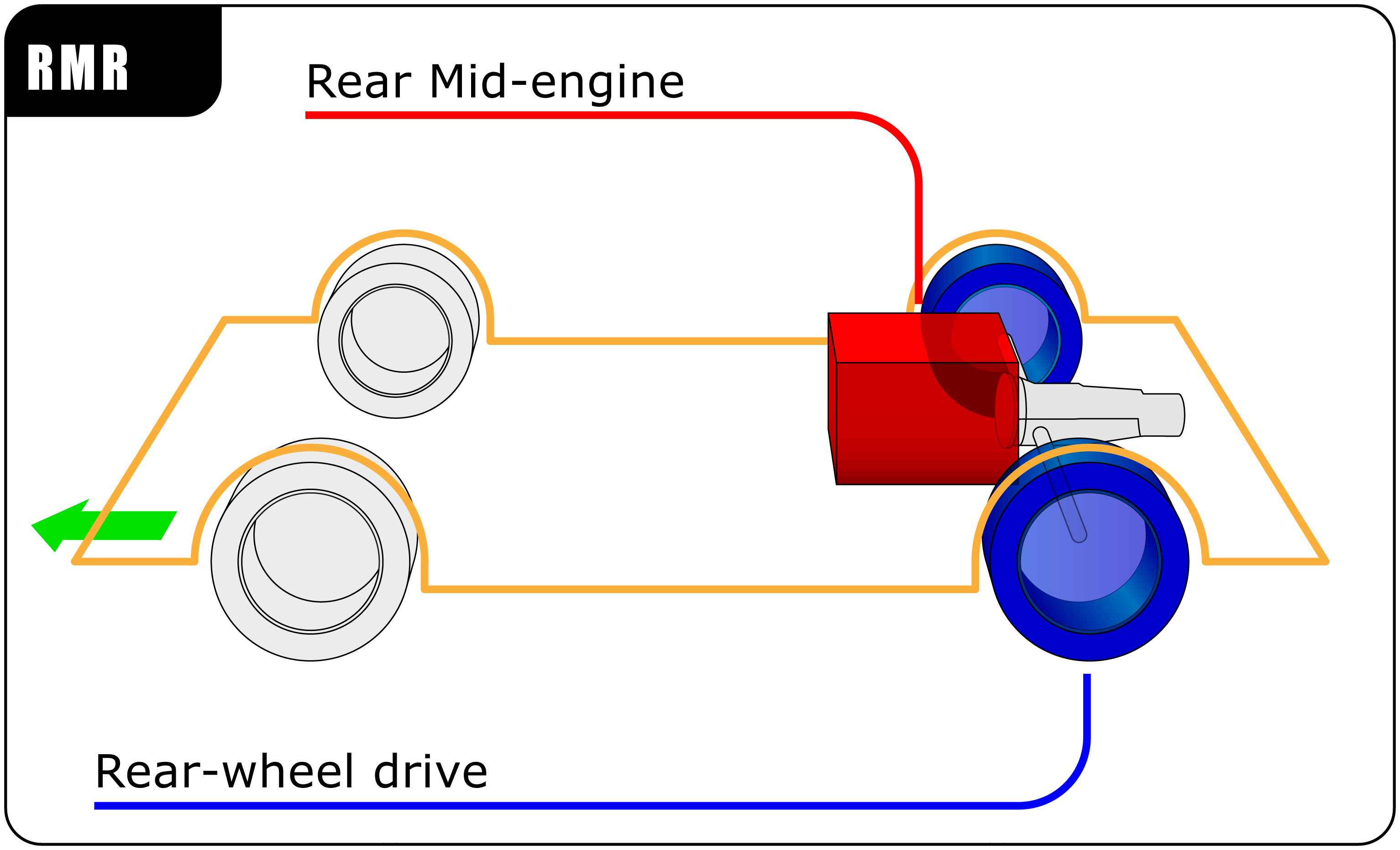
RMR layout; the engine is located in front of the rear axle.

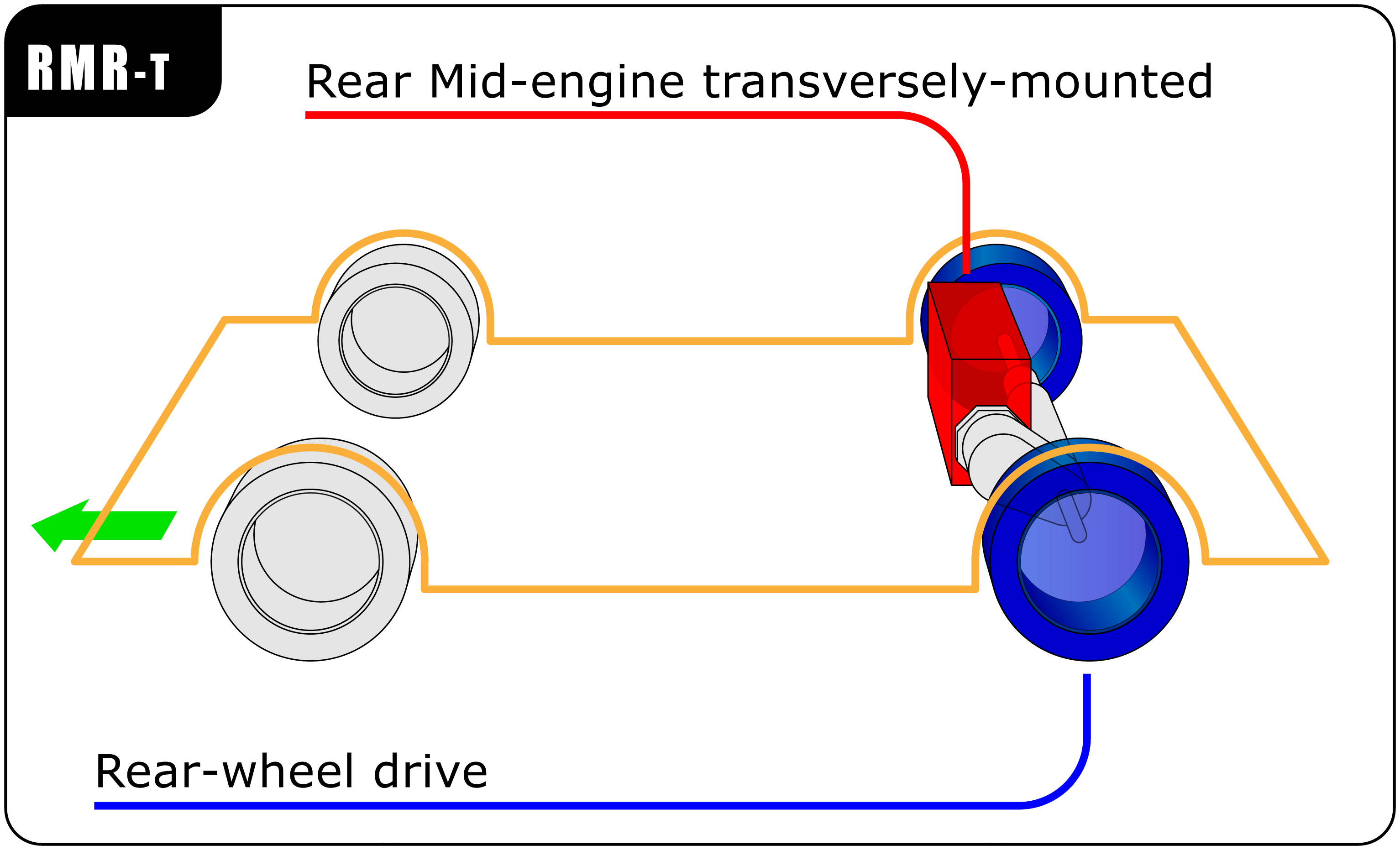
Rear mid-engine transversely-mounted / rear-wheel drive

In automotive design, an RMR, or rear mid-engine, rear-wheel-drive layout is one in which the rear wheels are driven by an engine placed with its center of gravity in front of the rear axle, and thus right behind the passenger compartment. Nowadays, such cars are more frequently called 'RMR', to acknowledge that certain sporty or performance-focused front-engine cars are also referred to as "mid-engine", the main engine mass being located behind the front axle. Until the early 1990s, RMR-layout cars were just called MR, or mid-engine, rear-wheel-drive layout), because the nuance between distinctly front-engined vs. front mid-engined cars often remained rather vague.

In contrast to the fully rear-engine, rear-wheel-drive layout, the center of mass of the engine is in front of the rear axle. This layout is typically chosen for its favorable weight distribution. Placing the car's heaviest component within the wheelbase minimizes its rotational inertia around the vertical axis, facilitating turn-in or yaw angle. Also, a near 50/50% weight distribution, with a slight rear weight bias, gives a very favorable balance, with significant weight being placed on the driven rear axle under acceleration, while distributing the weight fairly evenly under braking. This arrangement promotes optimal use of all four wheels to decelerate the car rapidly as well.

The RMR layout generally has a lower tendency to understeer. However, since there is less weight over the front wheels, under acceleration the front of the car can be prone to lift and still have understeer. Most rear-engine layouts have historically been used in smaller vehicles, because the weight of the engine at the rear has an adverse effect on a larger car's handling, making it 'tail-heavy', although this effect is more pronounced with engines mounted behind the rear axle. It is felt that the low polar inertia is crucial in selection of this layout. The mid-engined layout also uses up central space, making it generally only practical for single seating-row sports-cars, with exception to a handful of 2+2 designs. Additionally, some microtrucks use this layout, with a small, low engine beneath a flat load floor above the rear wheel-wells. This makes it possible to move the cab right to the front of the vehicle, thus increasing the loading area at the expense of slightly reduced load depth.

In modern racing cars, RMR is a common configuration and is usually synonymous with "mid-engine". Due to its weight distribution and the favorable vehicle dynamics it produces, this layout is heavily employed in open-wheel Formula racing cars (such as Formula One and IndyCar) as well as most purpose-built sports racing cars. This configuration was also common in smaller-engined 1950s microcars, in which the engines did not take up much space. Because of successes in motorsport, the RMR platform has been commonly used in many road-going sports cars despite the inherent challenges of design, maintenance and lack of cargo space. The similar mid-engine, four-wheel-drive layout gives many of the same advantages and is used when extra traction is desired, such as in some supercars and in the Group B rally cars.

== History ==
=== Nineteenth Century ===
Longitudinal section of Hancock's steam car of 1838 (from Mechanics Magazine of 7 Sep 1838)

The first vehicles recognisable as cars, Walter Hancock's steam cars of 1836 and 1838, had the two-cylinder transversely-mounted steam engine immediately behind the passengers with transmission by chains to the rear wheels. The 1838 version cruised at 10 - 12 mph, but could reach 20 mph.

In 1880 Amédée Bollée changed from using a front-mounted in-line steam engine with vertical cylinders to a mid/rear-mounted transverse one in his La Nouvelle steam brake. Carl Benz used a similar layout in his first cars (except that they had a single cylinder with a flywheel) and continued making such vehicles (e.g. the Benz Velo) until 1900. Émile Levassor led the move away from a mid/rear-mounted engine to a front-mounted one from 1892, retaining rear-wheel drive.

=== Early Racing ===
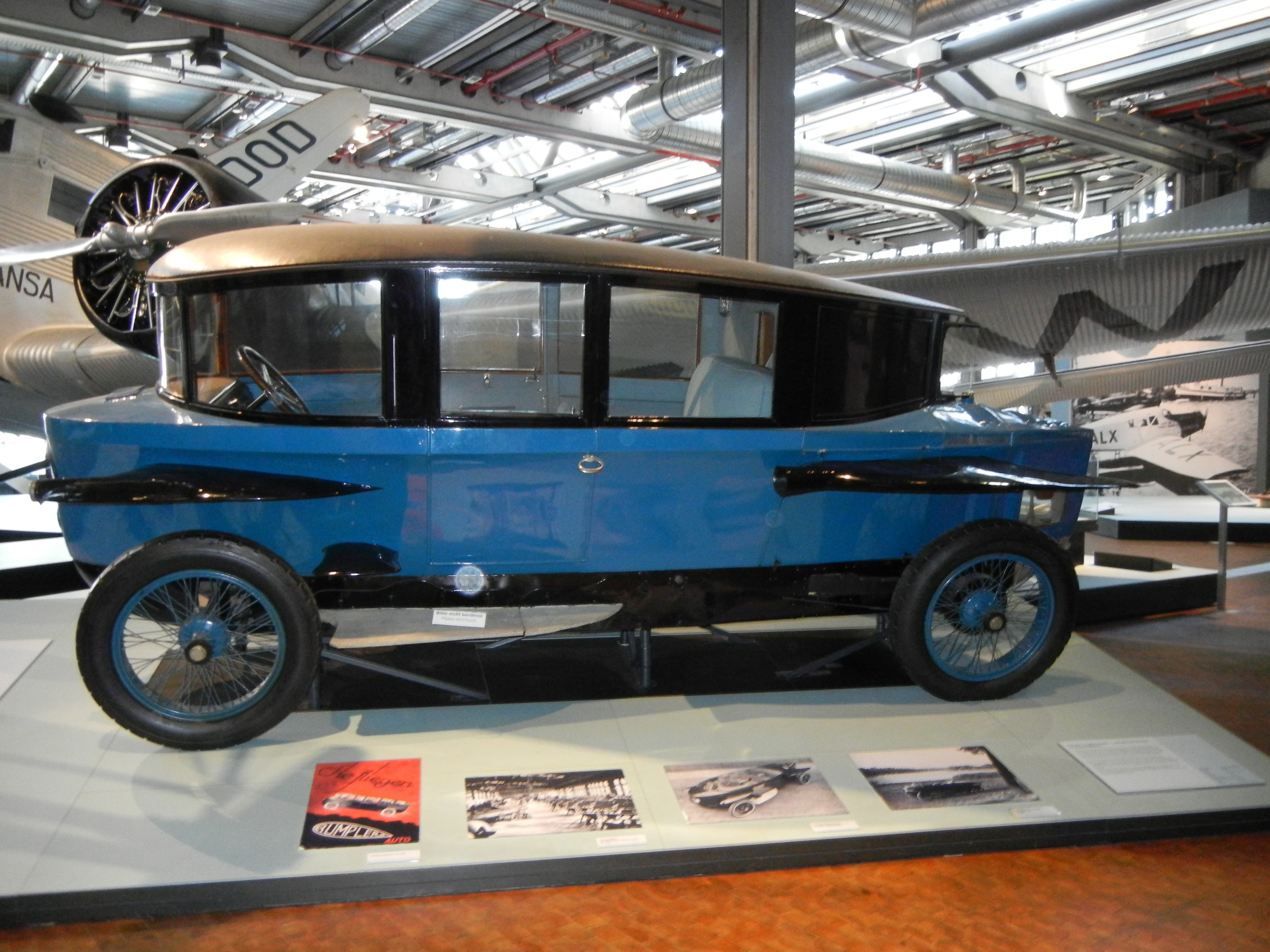
Rumpler Tropfenwagen

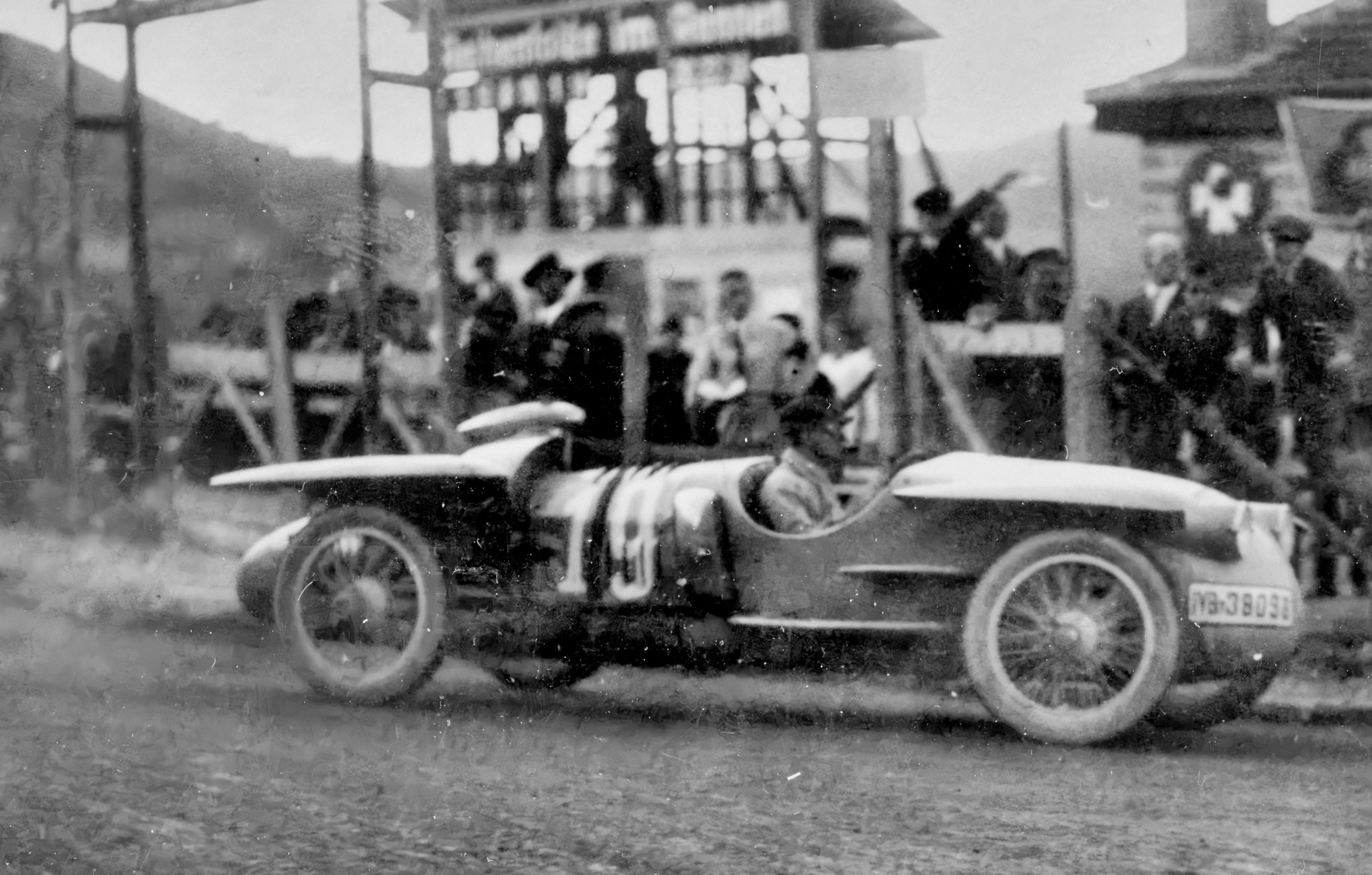
Benz RH Tropfenwagen racing in 1925 at Solituderennen, Stuttgart

The 1900 NW Rennzweier, built by Austrian Nesselsdorfer Wagenbau-Fabrik for Baron Theodor von Liebieg, was one of the first race cars purpose-built with mid-engine, rear-wheel-drive layout, using a flat-twin Benz & Cie. engine. Among the engineers was Edmund Rumpler, an Austrian engineer who also worked at Daimler and in aviation, and in 1921 built the Rumpler Tropfenwagen. His passenger car design was primarily streamlined teardrop-shaped for a low drag coefficient of only 0.28, the central driver seat and rear mid-engine layout only means to achieve it. The car, built in Berlin, was no success, but it was frequently used as taxi. At the time, there was only the AVUS circuit, and no Reichsautobahn network yet on which it could have made good use of its low drag as Grand tourer. Carl Benz & Söhne licensed the Tropfenwagen design in 1922, but the tall curved windscreen was not practical, and work focussed on open top cars.

The Benz Tropfenwagen race car was designed under Hans Nibel in 1923 in Germany, a time of crisis, which soon forced Daimler and Benz to cooperate and merge in 1926. Several configurations were tested, with different positions of driver, gas tank and radiators. For Grand Prix motor racing, then with a 2 liter capacity limit, a new engine had to be developed, still without the new superchargers that Ferdinand Porsche had introduced at Daimler, winning the Targa Florio in 1922 and 1924 for Mercedes. Three Benz RH cars competed in the 1923 Italian Grand Prix at the fast new track at Monza where Ferdinando Minoia finished fourth while supercharged FIATs dominated.

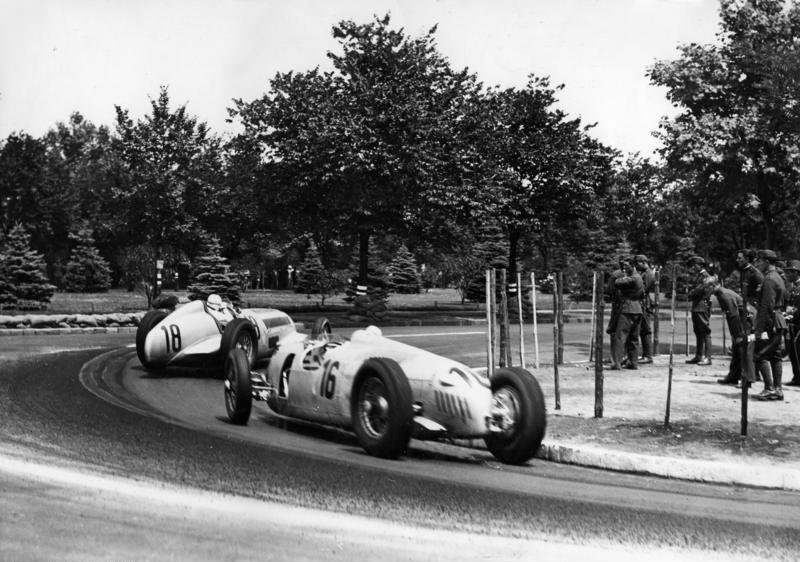
Champion Bernd Rosemeyer in the #16 Auto Union Typ C at the 1936 Hungarian Grand Prix

With superior traction, the mid engine cars were well suited for Hillclimbing and won several races in 1924 and 1925 with Franz Hörner, Willy Walb and Adolf Rosenberger who became business partner of Ferdinand Porsche when he set up his engineering bureau in Stuttgart. Porsche developed a mid-engine design concept for the 1934 Grand Prix rules. This P-Wagen was adopted for the Auto Union racing cars of the 1930s. The Auto Union became the first Grands Prix winning RMR racers, yet were difficult to drive, on circuits and in hillclimbing. The annual AIACR European Championship comprised only few events, mostly four, of which in the 1936 Grand Prix season all were won by Auto Union, with three more wins in other major races. Bernd Rosemeyer became the champion, winning five major Grands Prix in the supercharged V16 mid-engine, rear-wheel-drive Typ C. Mercedes developed new types and dominated the following seasons, though.

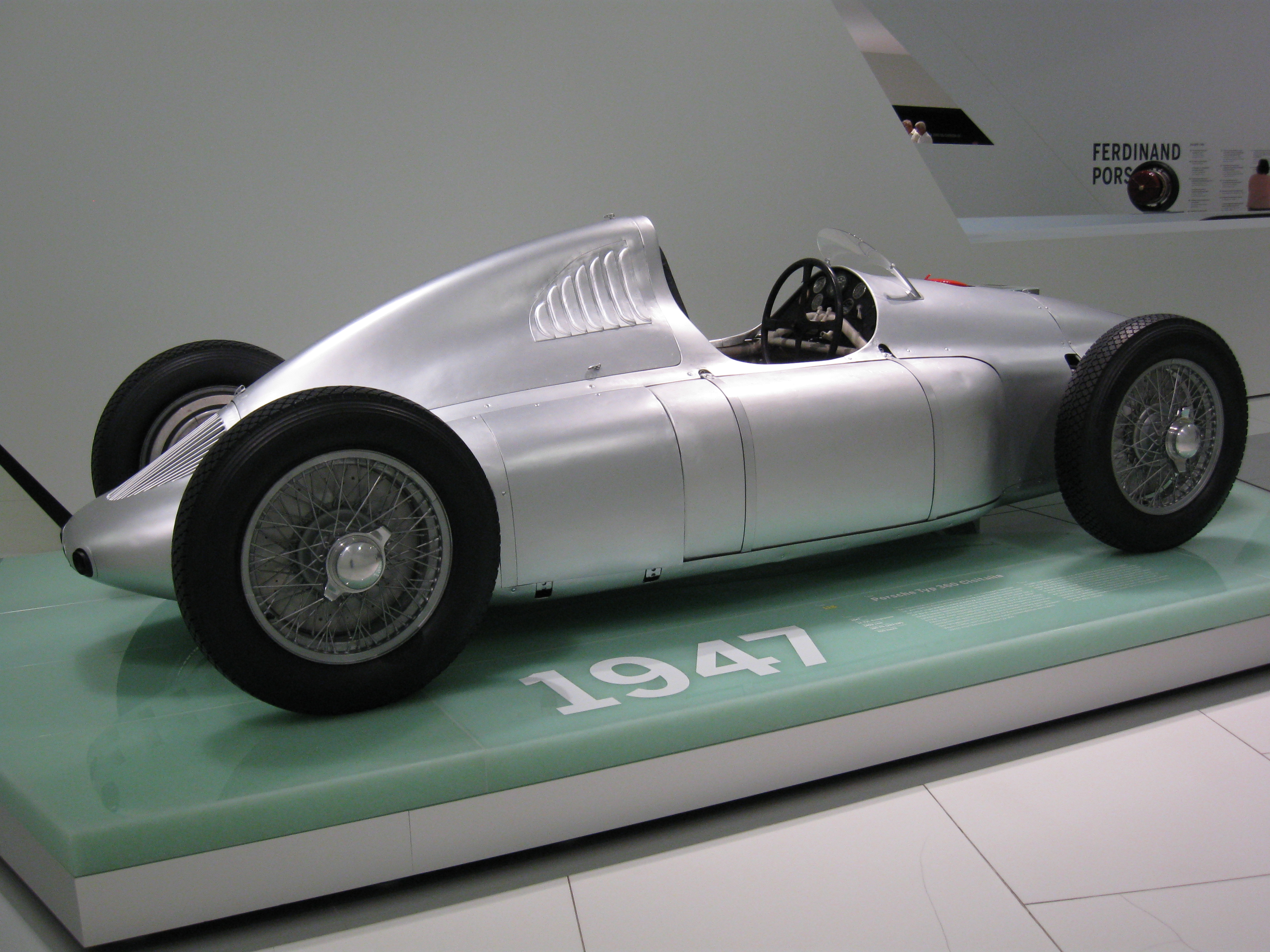
Porsche 360 Cisitalia Grand Prix

In 1946 Ferdinand Porsche was bailed out of prison to design a mid engine race car for Italians, the Porsche Type 360 Cisitalia Grand Prix, a Voiturette with supercharged 1500cc engine and even 4WD. Italian funding ran out before the car was raced. In Germany, dealer and racer Glöckler converted the rear engine 2+2 seater Porsche 356 into mid-engine 2-seat race cars and convinced Porsche to offer such a race-ready car: the tiny RMR Porsche 550 Spyder, which soon got a matching DOHC flat-4 engine. From 1954 onwards the 550A was notoriously winning in the 1500cc sports and endurance race car classes against much larger cars – a sign of greater things to come.

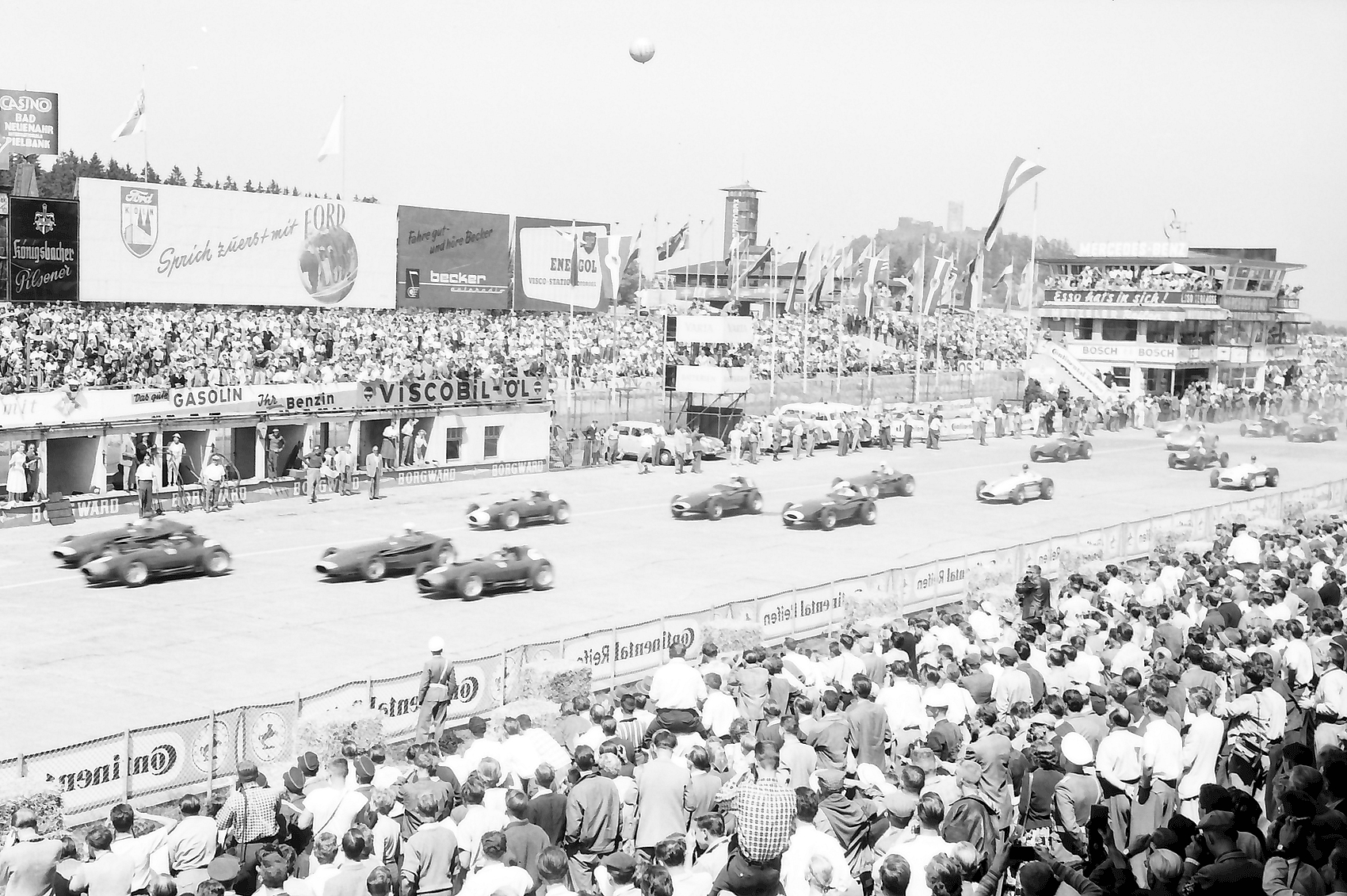
1957 German Grand Prix start with front-engine F1s chased by mid-engine F2s, a Cooper and two Porsche 550

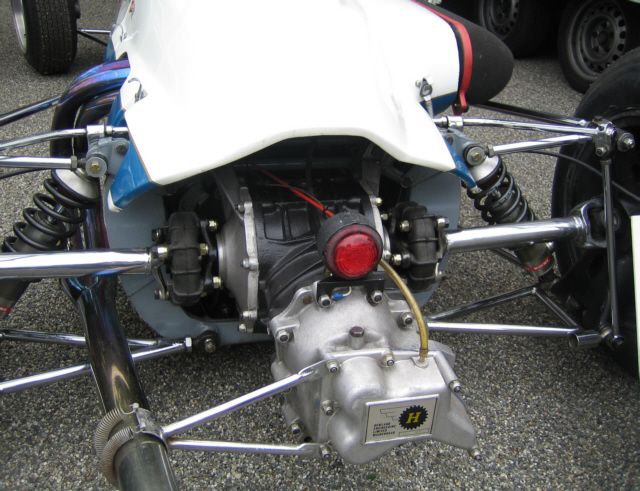
Also derived from a Porsche design, the Volkswagen Beetle: Hewland transaxle gearbox that allowed many teams to build mid engine race cars

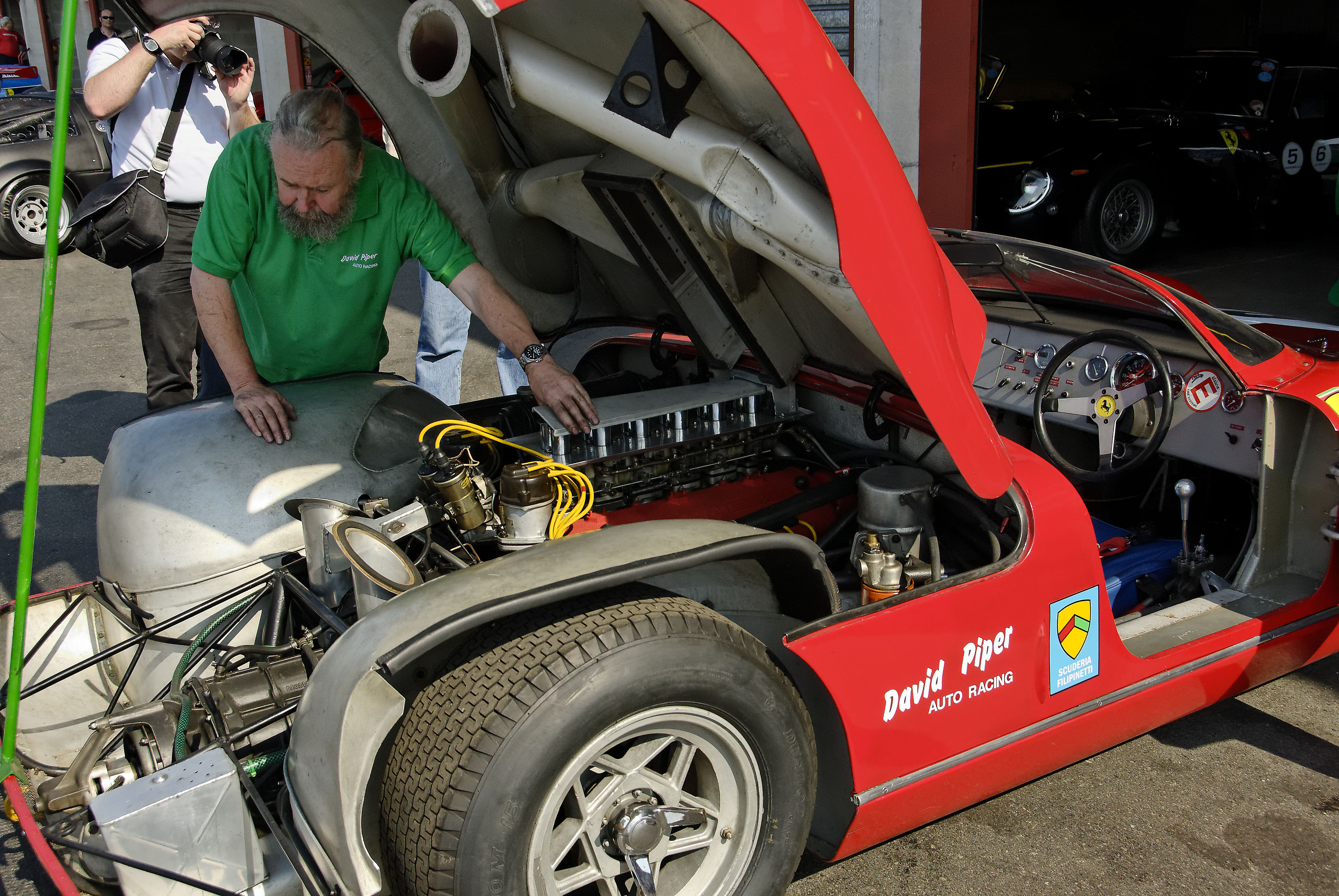
Ferrari V12 rear-mid-engine in a Ferrari P-series car, well hidden, intakes not visible from outside

At the 1956 French Grand Prix, the first rear mid-engine single seater appeared in Formula One racing, the Bugatti Type 251, which was uncompetitive, though. In the 1957 German Grand Prix, 1500cc Formula Two cars were allowed. Six mid-engined Cooper-Climax showed up, and three closed bodywork Porsche 550 sportscars of which passenger seat and spare wheel were removed, making them single seaters. Edgar Barth qualified and finished 12th, ahead of some 2500cc F1 and all open-wheel F2.

=== Mid-engine revolutions in racing series ===
A swift Mid-engine revolution converted Formula One from old front engine glory to new mid-engine dominance in just about a year, between early 1958 and June of 1959.

The mid-engine Cooper F2 cars with the 1500cc Climax FPF engine received a 2 litre version for F1 races, and won the first two races of the 1958 Formula One season, under rather unusual circumstances, though. Due to lack of power they were not competitive in the remainder of that season, but the warning shots had been fired.

When the Climax engine was bored out to full capacity for the 1959 Formula One season, Jack Brabham won the first Grand Prix in Monaco in a Cooper, and defended his Championship lead till the end. The last proper win of a front engine F1 car on a twisty circuit occurred already at the 31 May 1959 Dutch Grand Prix, by Joakim Bonnier in a BRM P25. Front engine cars from Scarab and Aston Martin were outclassed, and even Ferraris would win only three more GPs, all on high speed circuits: 1959 French Grand Prix at Reims, 1959 German Grand Prix on the banked Berlin AVUS. In the 1960 Formula One season, Ferrari could score podiums only in the first to races, with Cooper and Lotus leading in the constructor standings. For the 1960 Italian Grand Prix, the banked oval version of Monza was chosen by the local organisers, to help Ferrari win a last hurrah with superior engine power, in absence of British teams that did not bother to take part. Ferrari already ran the future mid-engine car and smaller engine.

Thus, with Lotus and BRM adopting the Cooper-Climax layout, the mid-engine revolution of F1 was completed before 1961. It dragged on much longer in sports car racing where the underpowered Porsche 550 since 1953 won many class victories, at the 1954 Carrera Panamericana, the final one, and basically every year at the 24 Hours of Le Mans. The 1956 Targa Florio was the first major overall win for a mid-engine race car since the 1930s, but in a year the event was not part of the World Sportscar Championship. Already in 1957, the Porsche 718 was introduced, winning the 1959 Targa Florio, providing the first mid-engine win in the 1959 World Sportscar Championship. In the 1960 World Sportscar Championship, Porsche also won the Sebring 12h, and with two wins and a second place tied Ferrari in the Championships, but the Scuderia won the title due to two third places over one for Stuttgart, which barely made it into the top ten at the 1960 24 Hours of Le Mans against cars with double or triple capacity.

For the 1961 World Sportscar Championship, Ferrari adopted the mid-engine layout at least with the Dino V6-powered Ferrari SP series. With more power from a 2.4 litre engine, but good handling, it won the 1961 Targa Florio over the Porsche, and again in the 1962 Targa Florio. Front engine Ferrari, Jaguar and other large GT still prevailed at Le Mans, until the 1962 24 Hours of Le Mans. For the 1963 World Sportscar Championship, the FIA allowed prototypes, and Ferrari finally moved the big V12 behind the driver, opening the Ferrari P series with a 3 litre 250P that achieved immediate success on the racetrack, winning the 12 Hours of Sebring, 1000 km Nürburgring, and the all-important 1963 24 Hours of Le Mans. Thus, the mid-engine revolution took place in Sportscar racing, as other manufacturers joined in, putting big US V8s behind drivers, namely Lola and Ford with the Ford GT40.

The pioneer of mid-engine racing, Porsche, had won its token F1 Grand Prix in 1962, but was denied an overall 24h Le Mans win until the Porsche 917K finally succeeded in 1970. CanAm wins followed in 1972 when the 917/10 was turbocharged.

The last pure-bred circuit racing series to adopt the mid-engine layout was the Indianapolis 500-style oval racing in the US. Already at the 1961 Indianapolis 500 the Cooper Car Company with Jack Brabham was running as high as third and finished ninth. Cooper did not return, but from 1963 on "British Invasion" built mid-engined cars from constructors like Brabham, Lotus and Lola competed regularly, and driven by the new Ford Indy V8 engine, the Lotus 38-Ford of Jim Clark won in 1965, followed by the Lola of Graham Hill in 1966.

In tin-top racing, GT and Touring cars, different layouts still compete. The rear engine Porsche 911, having won the 1973 Targa Florio, Daytona, and as turbocharged 935 even the 1979 Le Mans overall, is still going strong in GT racing in which Balance of performance ensures parity of different layouts, mostly mid-engine Ferrari and even Corvette C7, with the Ford Mustang GTD and BMW still championing the standard front engine rear drive layout.

=== Road cars ===
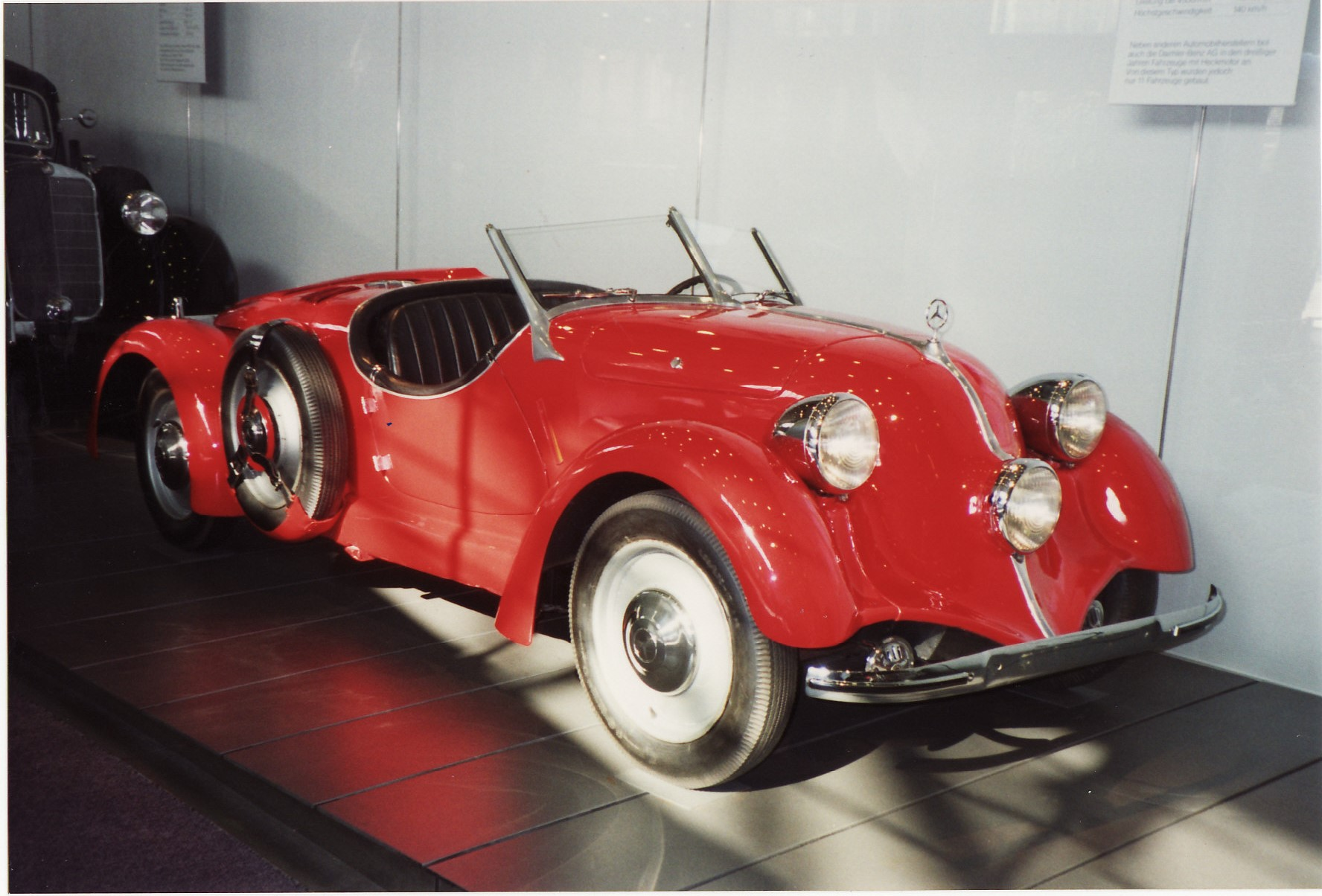
Mercedes-Benz 150H, 1935

The Mercedes-Benz 130H and 170H series of the 1930s had the engine in the back, pre-dating the Volkswagen, but the model offered in between, the 150H, had a mid-engine layout to improve handling in sport events. It had no usable trunk, engine in the rear and gas tank in the front, was more expensive and less practical than front engine Mercedes, and sold only in low numbers before being discontinued.

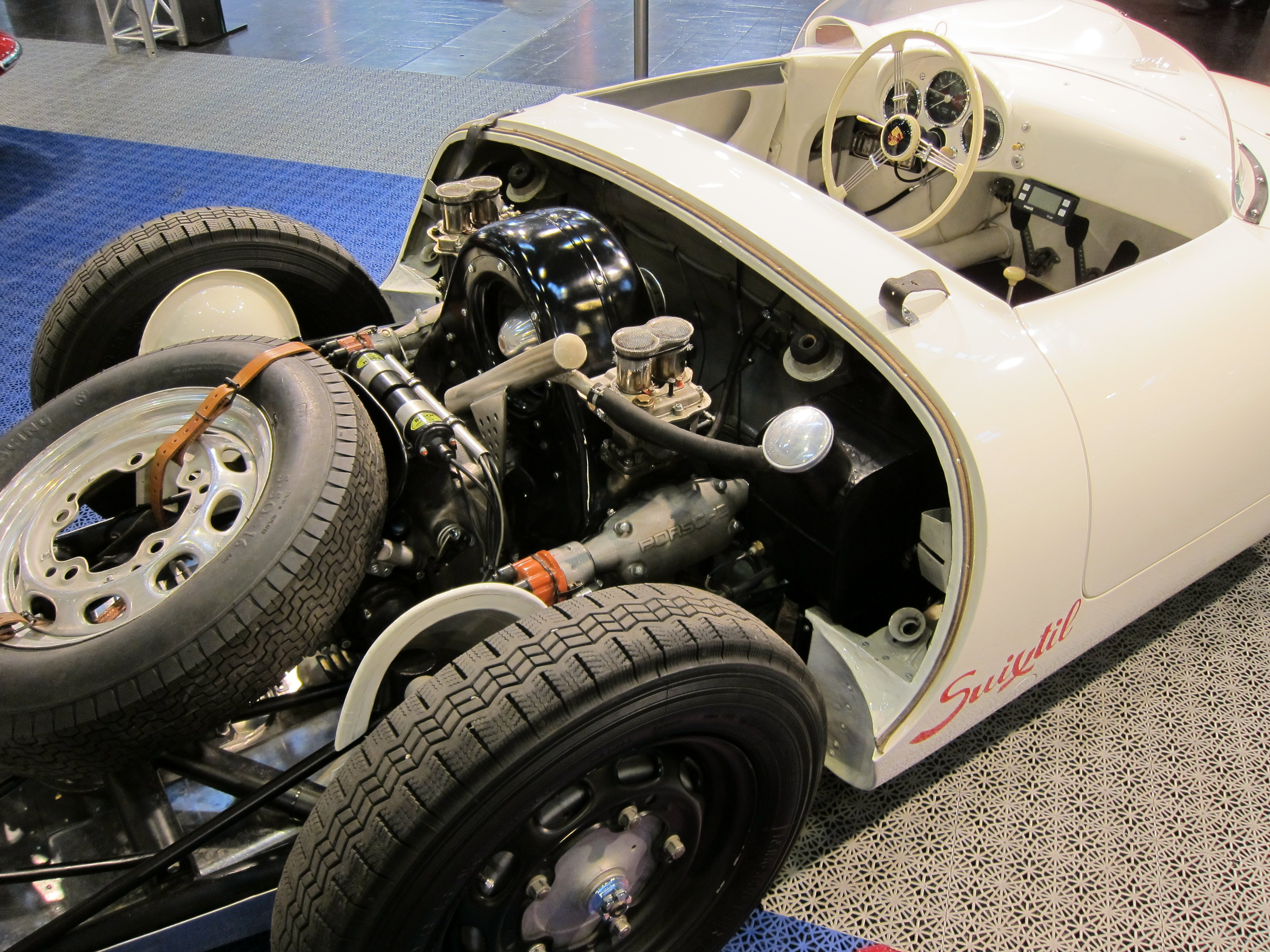
Porsche 550 mid engine. James Dean was not killed racing his 550 but in a head-on crash on a public road

Rear mid-engines were widely used in 1950s bubble microcars like the Isetta or the nearly symmetric Zündapp Janus. The very first Porsche 356/1 was mid-engined, but the regular production 356 used the 2+2 seat rear engine layout of the Volkswagen to be useful as regular car. Some customers wanted to race a Porsche, and the factory in 1953 started the series of rear-mid-engine two seat sports cars from Zuffenhausen with the Porsche 550. Via 718 and 904 it ended with the Porsche 906. They were mainly intended for competition use, but also road legal as this was either required by the rules, or by customers who wanted to drive to and from events, James Dean being a famous example. Porsche sold about 300 road-racers until 1966, compared to 77k of the 356. From 1969, the VW-Porsche 914/4 was offered as entry level mid-engine 2-seat road car with 4-cyl VW engine, the 914/6 used a Porsche flat-6, and the Porsche 914-6 GT was its racer version.

The first rear mid-engined road car sold after WW II was the 1962 (Réné) Bonnet / Matra Djet, which used the 1108cc Renault Sierra engine, mated to the transaxle from the FWD Renault Estafette van. Nearly 1700 were built until 1967. This was followed by the first De Tomaso, the Vallelunga, which mated a tuned Ford Cortina 1500 Kent engine to a VW transaxle with Hewland gearsets. Introduced at Turin in 1963, 58 were built 1964–68. A similar car was the Renault-engined Lotus Europa, built from 1966 to 1975.

There were no big mid-rear engines yet until the Italian ATS 2500 GT V8 appeared in 1963, and in 1966, the Lamborghini Miura was the first high performance V12 mid-engine, rear-wheel-drive road car. The concept behind the Miura was that of putting on the road a grand tourer featuring state-of-the-art racing-car technology of the time; hence the Miura was powered by a 4-liter V12 transversely mounted between the rear wheels, solidal to the gearbox and differential. This represented an extremely innovative sportscar at a time when all of its competitors (aside from the rear-engined Porsches), from Ferraris and Maseratis over Jaguars to Aston Martins, were traditional front-engined, rear-wheel-drive grand tourers.

The Pontiac Fiero was a mid-engined sports car that was built by the Pontiac division of General Motors from 1984 to 1988. The Fiero was the first two-seater Pontiac since the 1926 to 1938 coupes, and also the first mass-produced mid-engine sports car by a U.S. manufacturer.

=== Transverse versus longitudinal layout ===
Whilst early mid-engined cars such as the Miura and various Ferrari/Dino cars used a transverse layout with the crankshaft parallel to the axle, later supercars (such as the Miura's successor, the Countach) use a longitudinal layout positioning the engine ahead of the axle, either with a transmission on the back of the engine or a transaxle mounted on it. The transverse mid-engined layout is still common amongst smaller sports cars, which often borrow heavily from front-wheel drive vehicles, such as the Toyota MR2 and Alfa Romeo 4C. This allows for a compact layout and reduces development and component costs, including those companies which rely on engines from other manufacturers (such as the Lotus Elise). In a similar vein, many longitudinal mid-engined cars share engines with front-engine, rear-wheel drive cars, such as the LaFerrari and Pagani Zonda.

==== Mid-engined 2+2s ====
During the 1970s and 1980s some manufacturers would also use the transverse layout to increase interior space to allow for 2+2 seating, with the Ferrari/Dino 308 GT4 and Mondial, and the Lamborghini Urraco as notable examples. The Lotus Evora continued the concept in the 2000s, albeit with a V6 rather than V8 engine. Unlike the Ferrari and Lamborghini, the Maserati Merak managed to fit the 2+2 layout in a longitudinal engine arrangement by using a V6 engine.

== Gallery ==
=== Mid-engine transversely-mounted, rear-wheel-drive layout ===
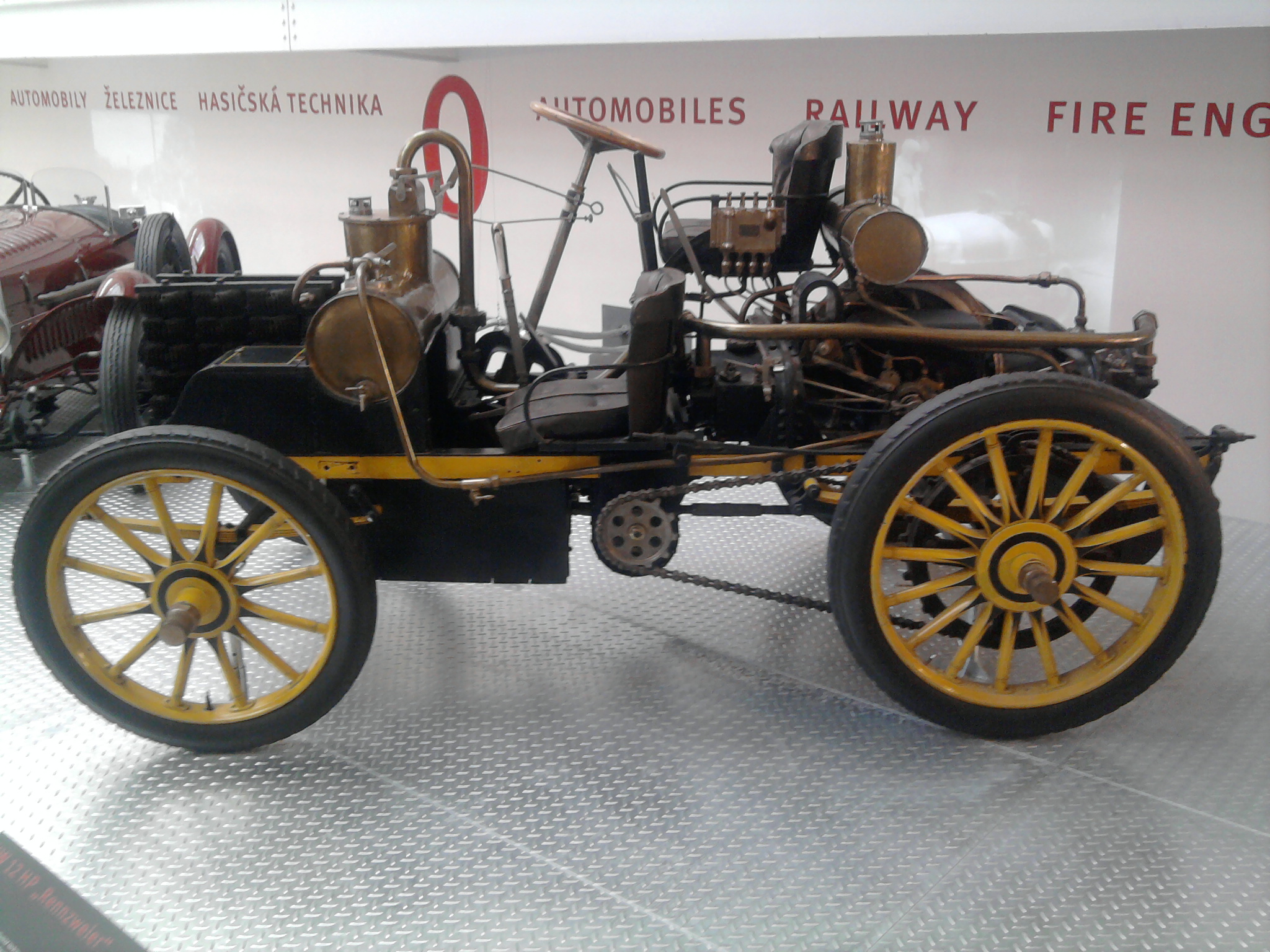
NW Rennzweier, first of the long line of Tatra racing cars

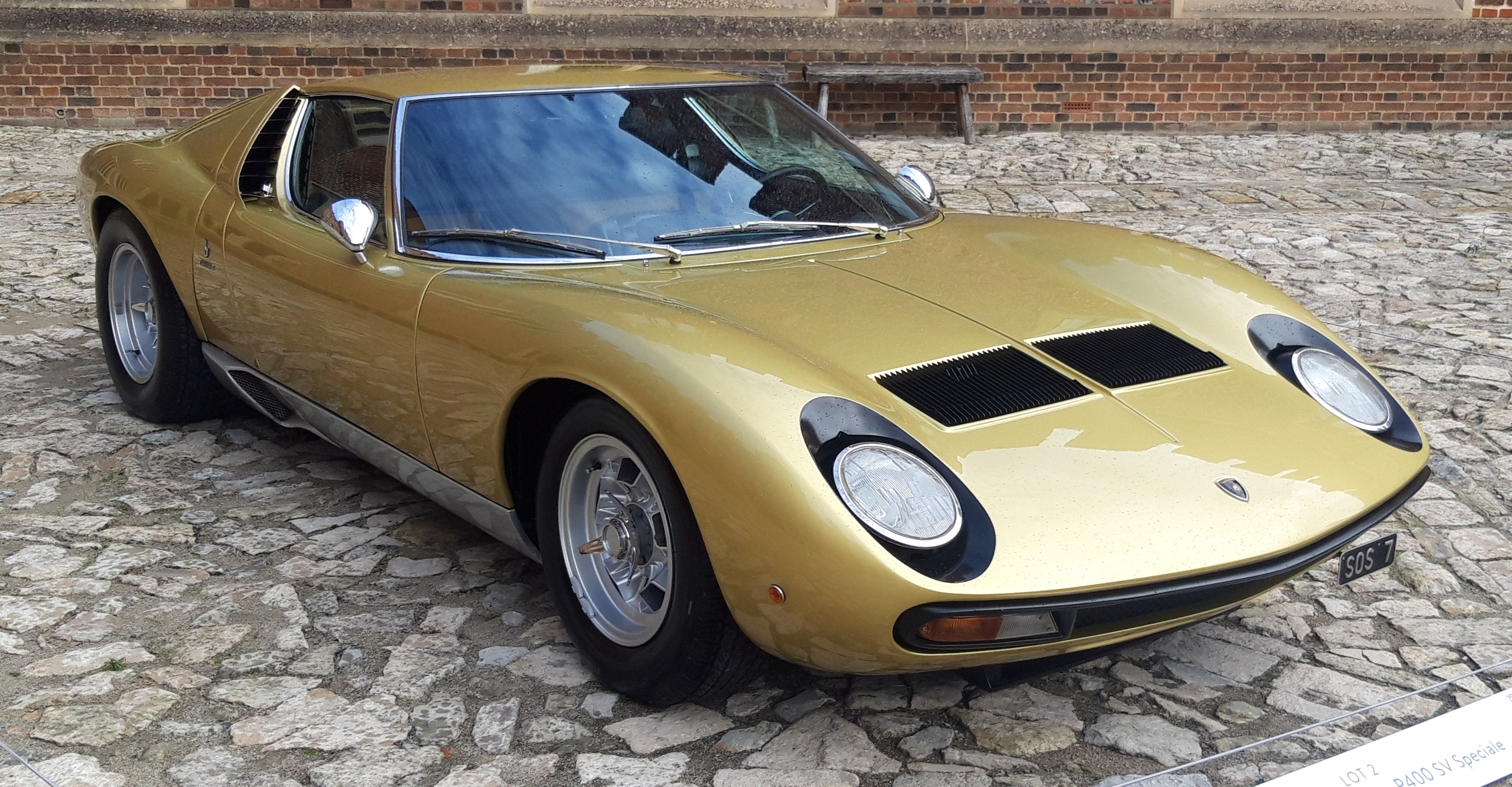
The Lamborghini Miura, incorrectly accounted as the first mid-engined roadcar

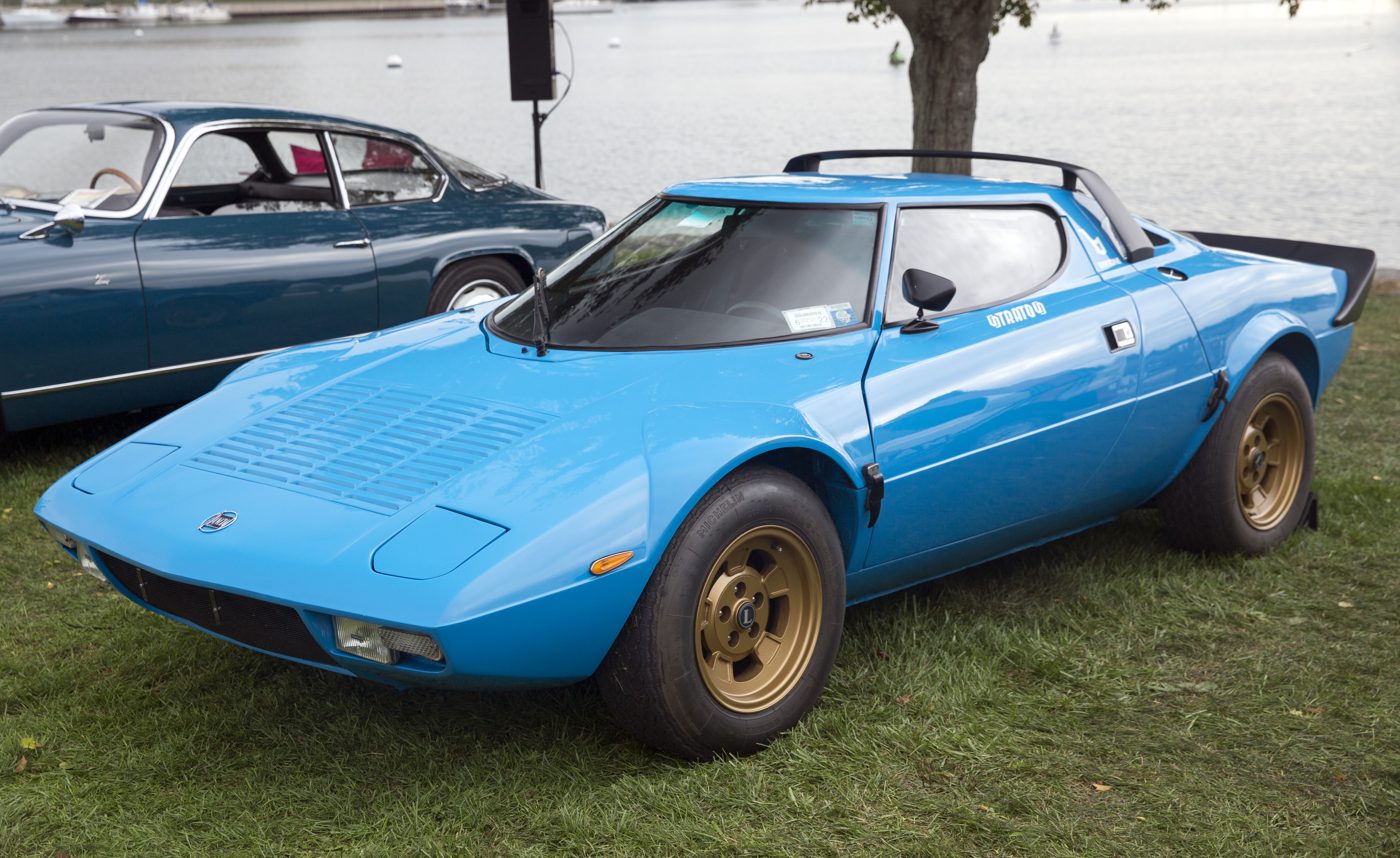
The Lancia Stratos HF was powered by a mid-transverse mounted Dino Ferrari V6, and proved to be very successful as a rally car.

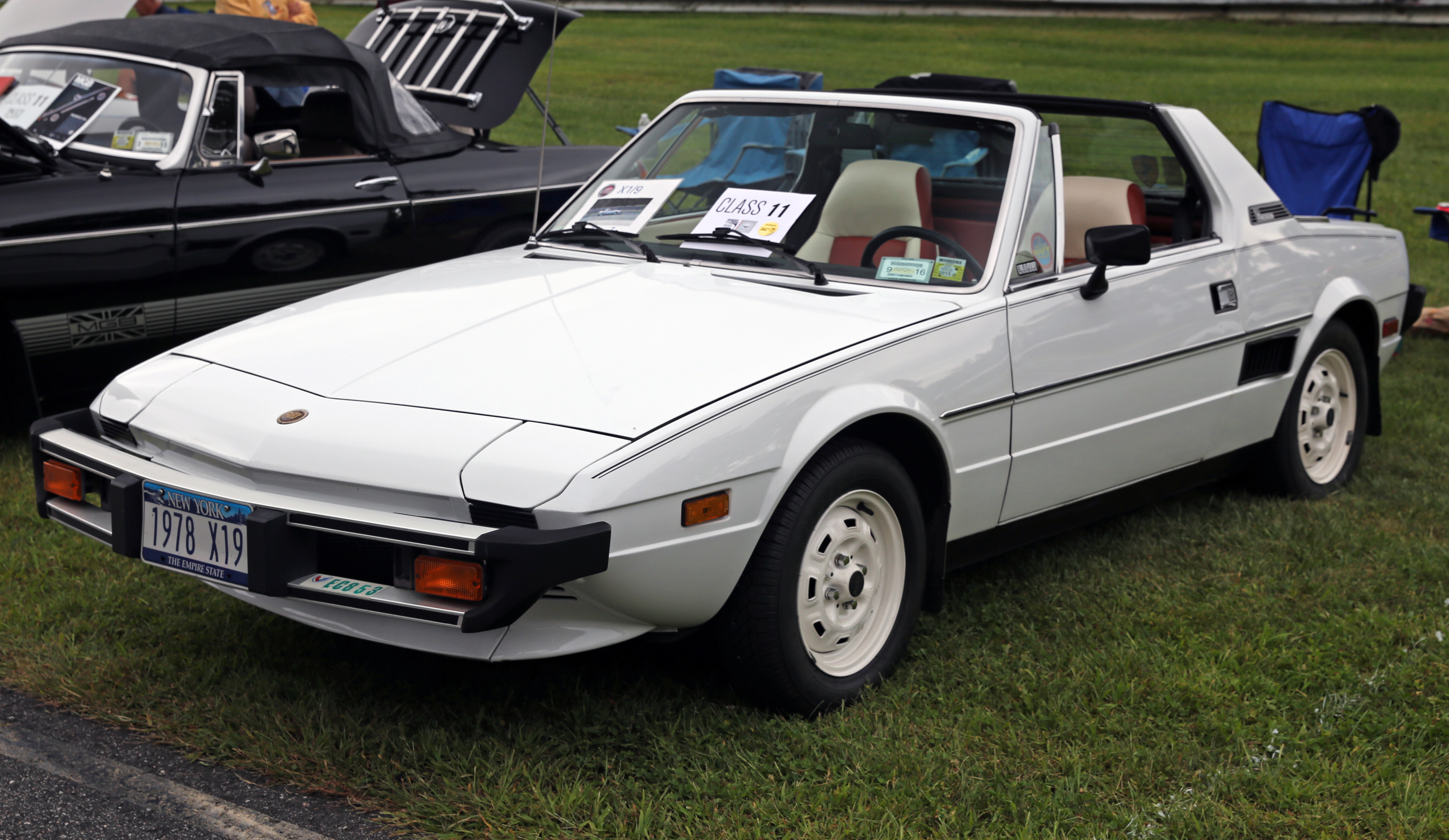
The Fiat X1/9 was designed around the all-new front-wheel drive Fiat 128, but used these parts in a radical way, moving the entire transverse drive train and suspension assembly from the front of the 128 to the rear of the passenger cabin.

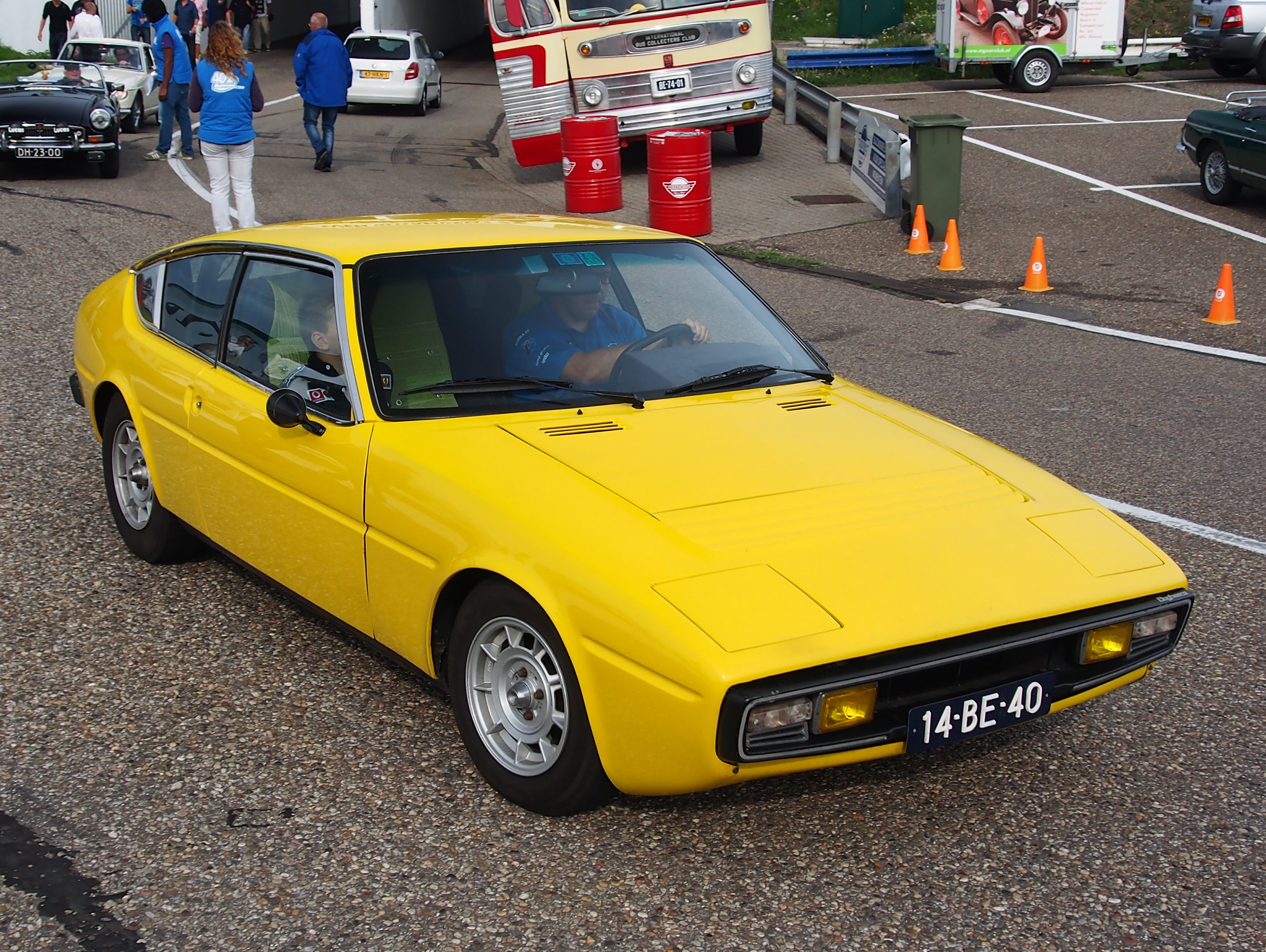
As with many "rear mid-engine transversely-mounted / rear-wheel-drive layouts", the Matra-Simca Bagheera shared Simcas 1100 and 1307 front-wheel-drive mechanicals, but placed behind the passenger compartment.

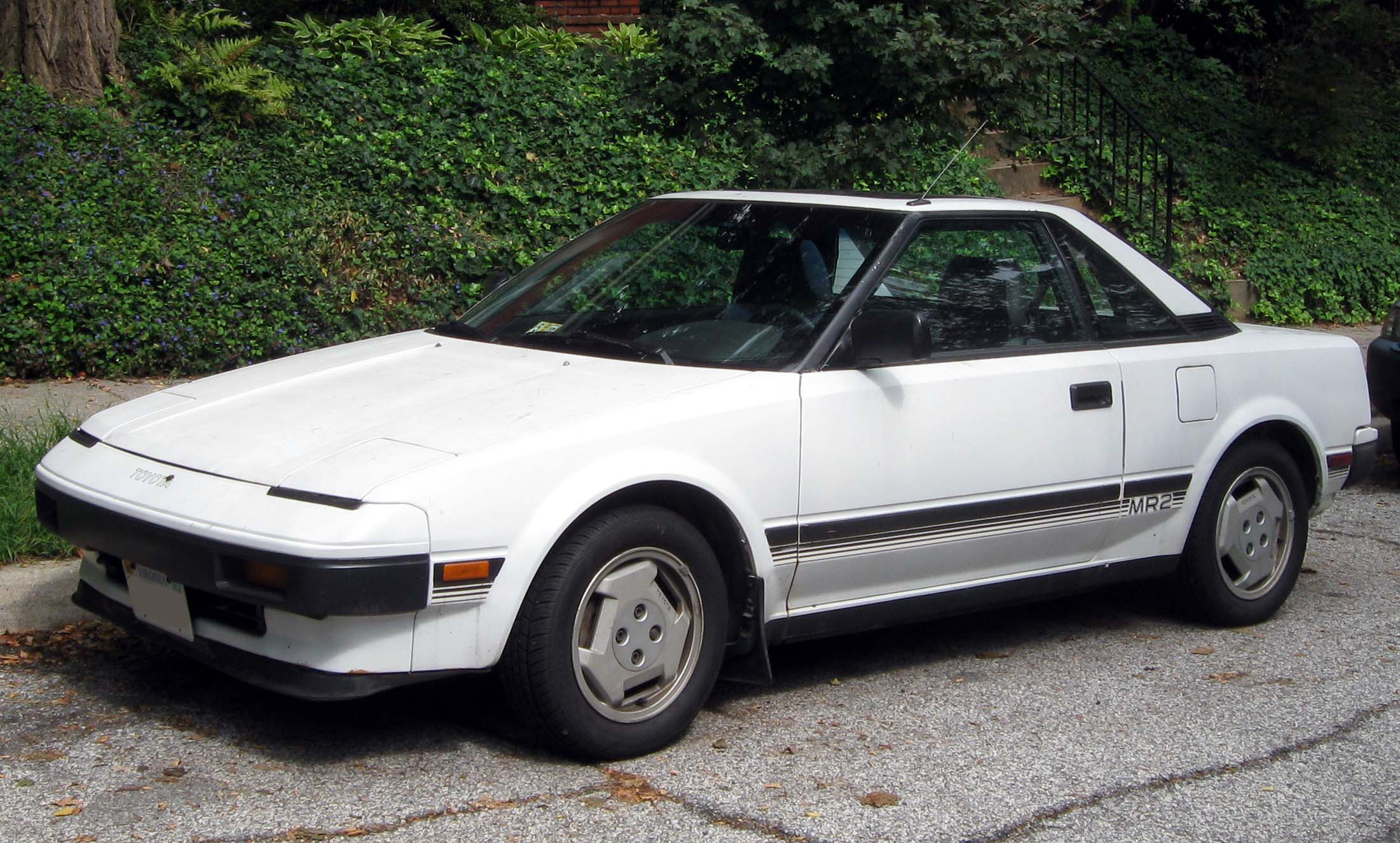
Toyota MR2, Japan's first rear mid-engined production sportscar, sold internationally over three generations (1984–2007)

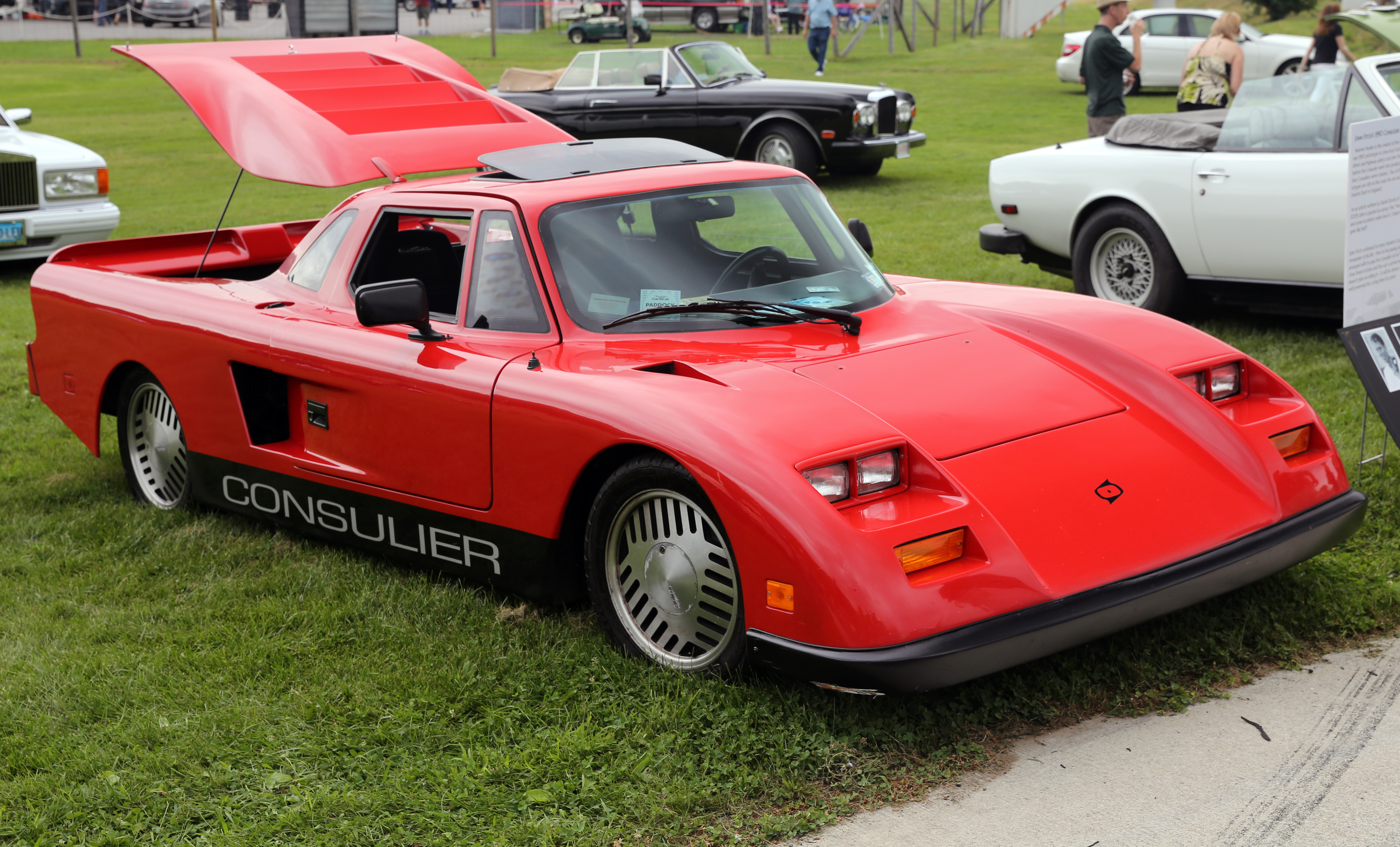
The Consulier GTP incorporated a mid-transverse mounted Chrysler 2.2 Turbo III engine; it was successful in IMSA competition until it was banned in 1991.

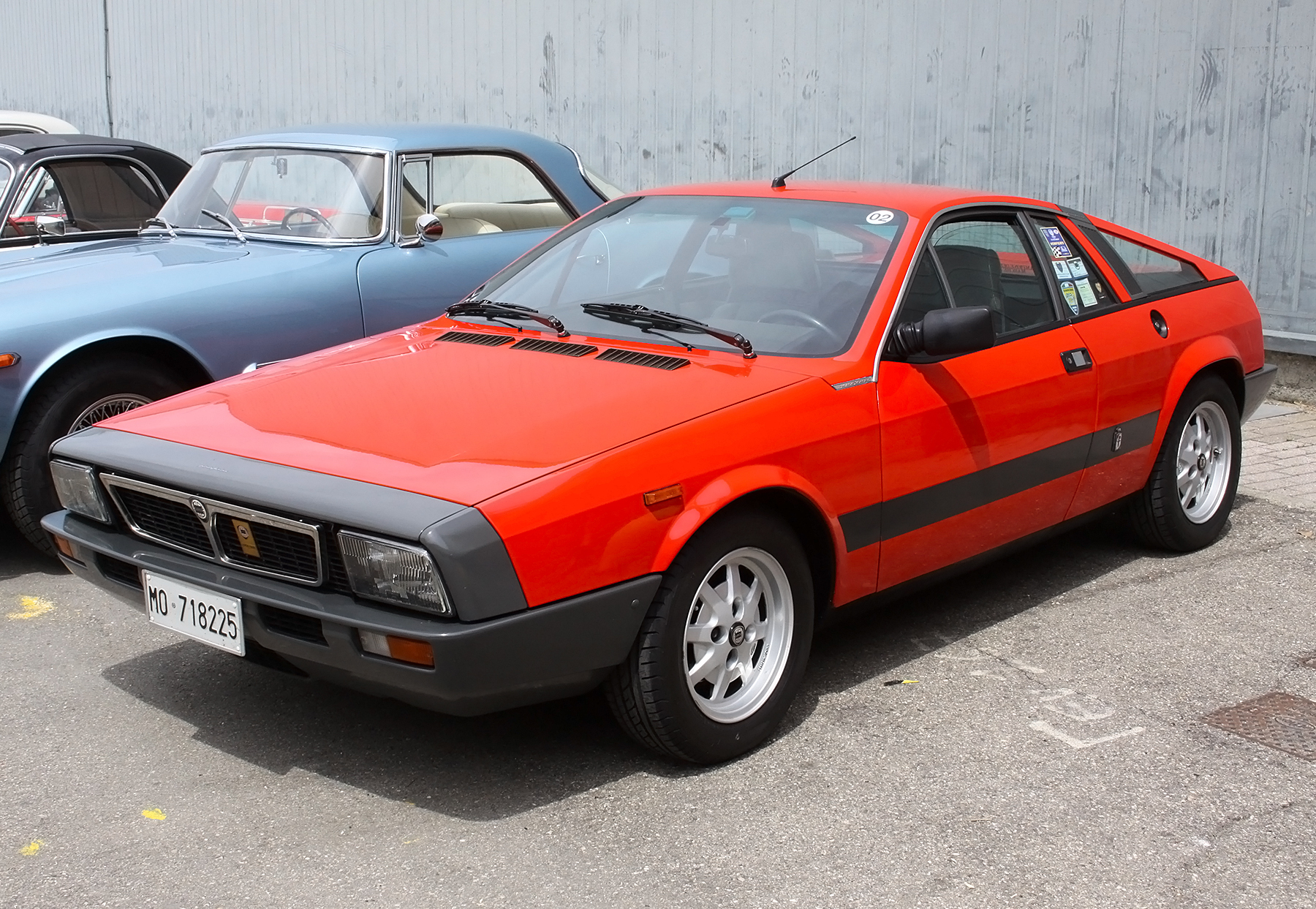
The Lancia Montecarlo sports car, marketed in the US as the Lancia Scorpion, was developed as part of the Beta range and was powered by a transverse twin-cam, 4 cylinder engine.

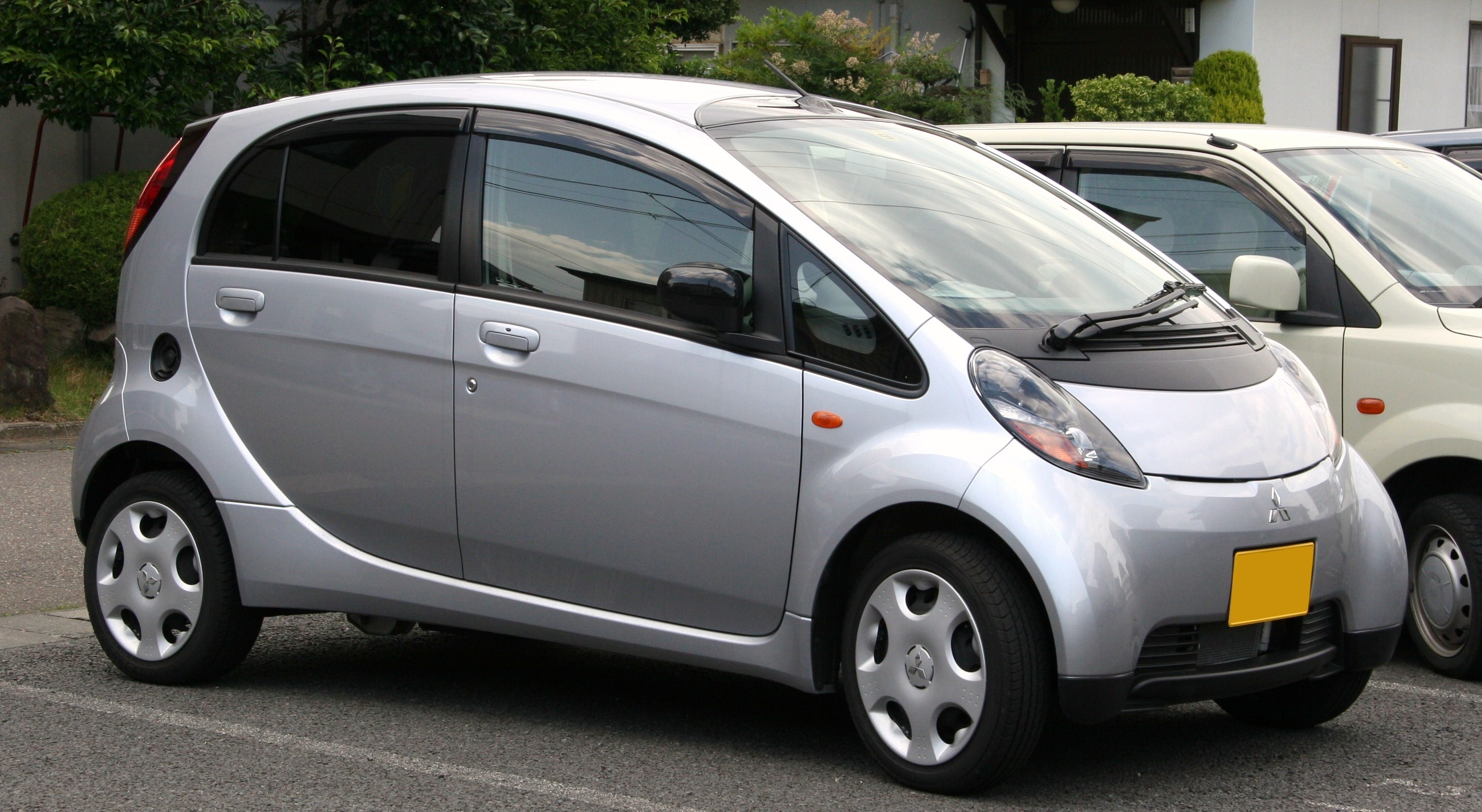
The Mitsubishi i is powered by a 3-cylinder engine mounted behind the rear seats.

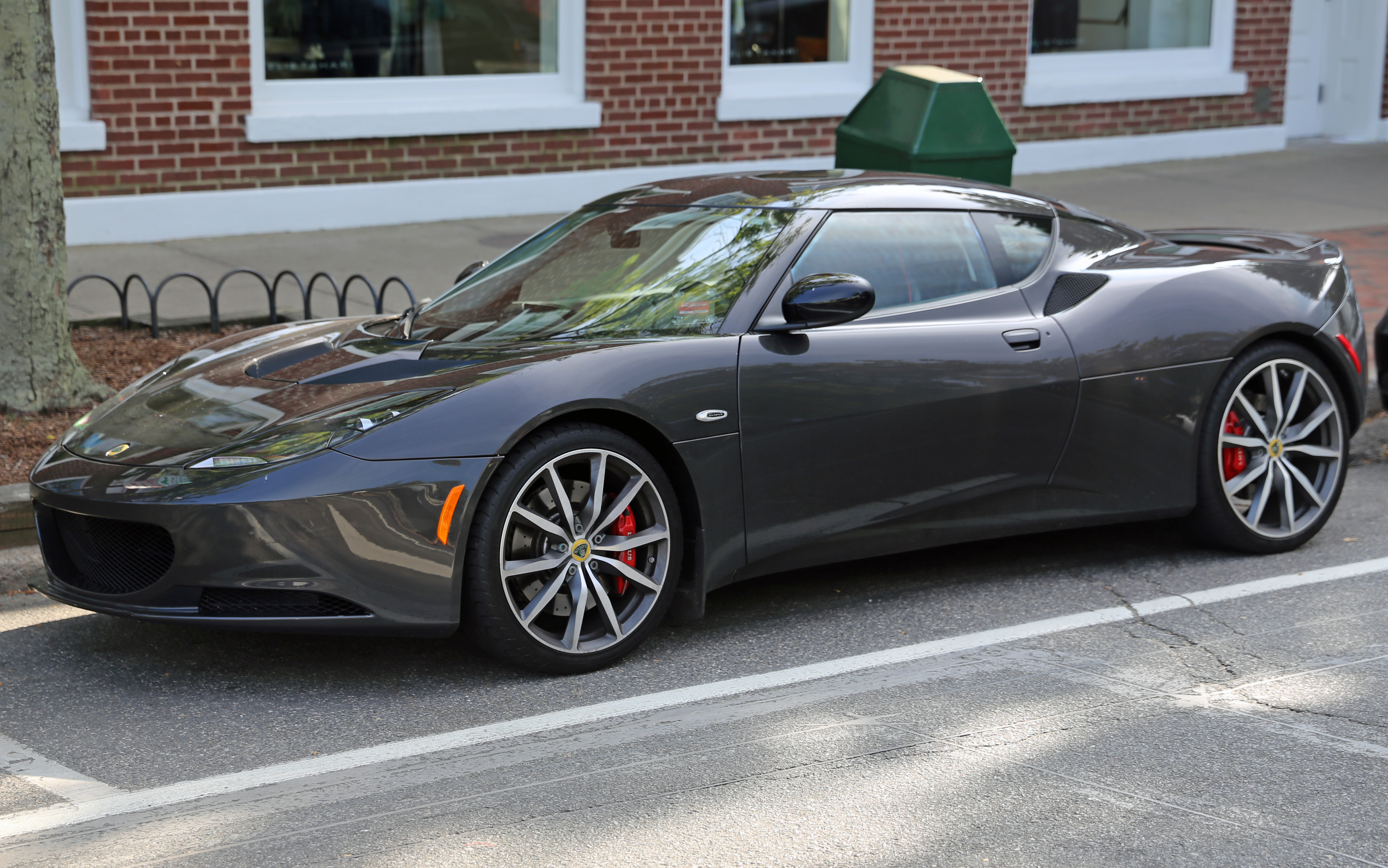
The Lotus Evora uses a transversely mounted Toyota V6 engine.

=== Mid-engine longitudinally-mounted, rear-wheel-drive layout ===
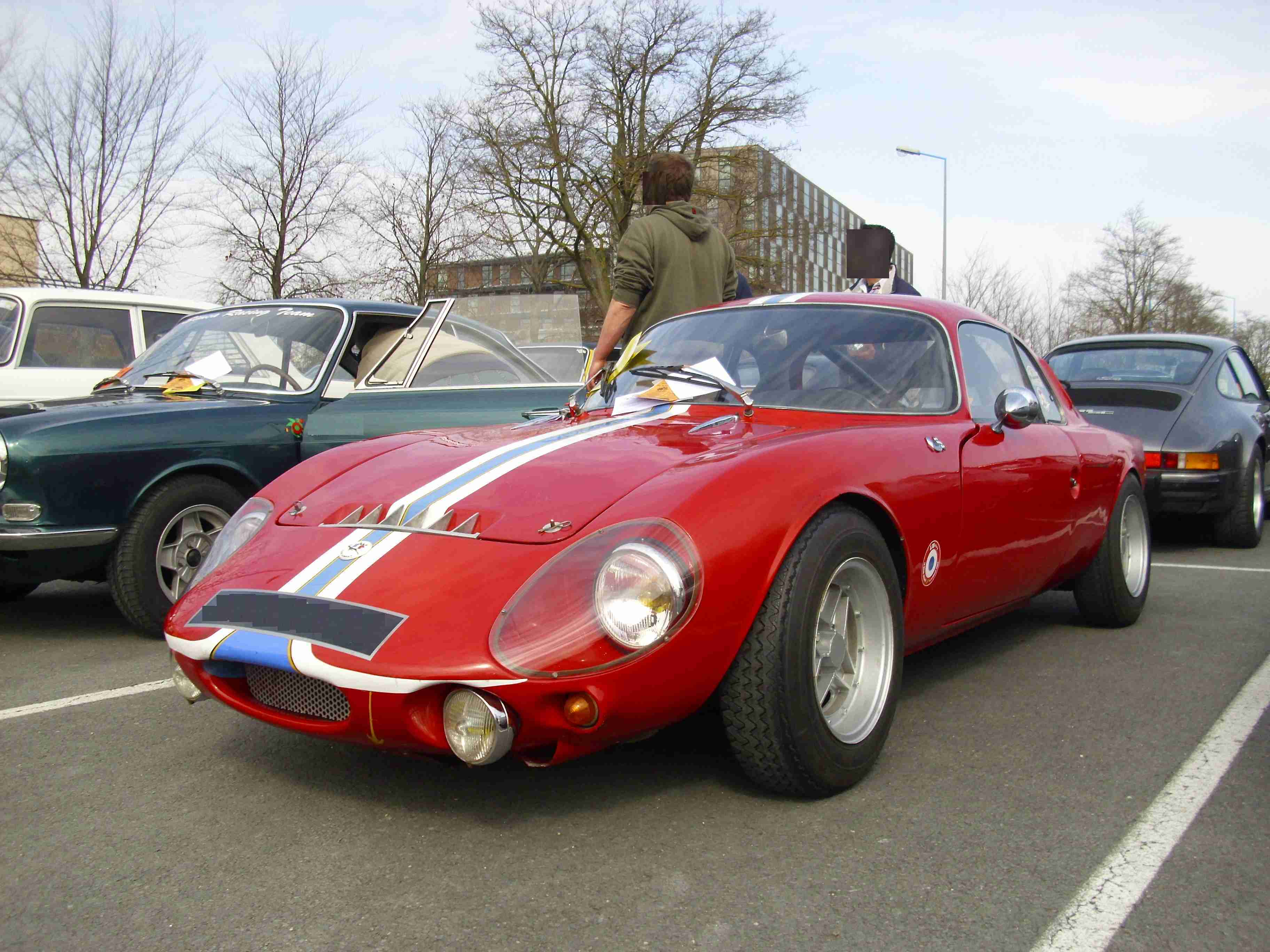
1962 René Bonnet Djet is the world's first rear mid-engined production road car.

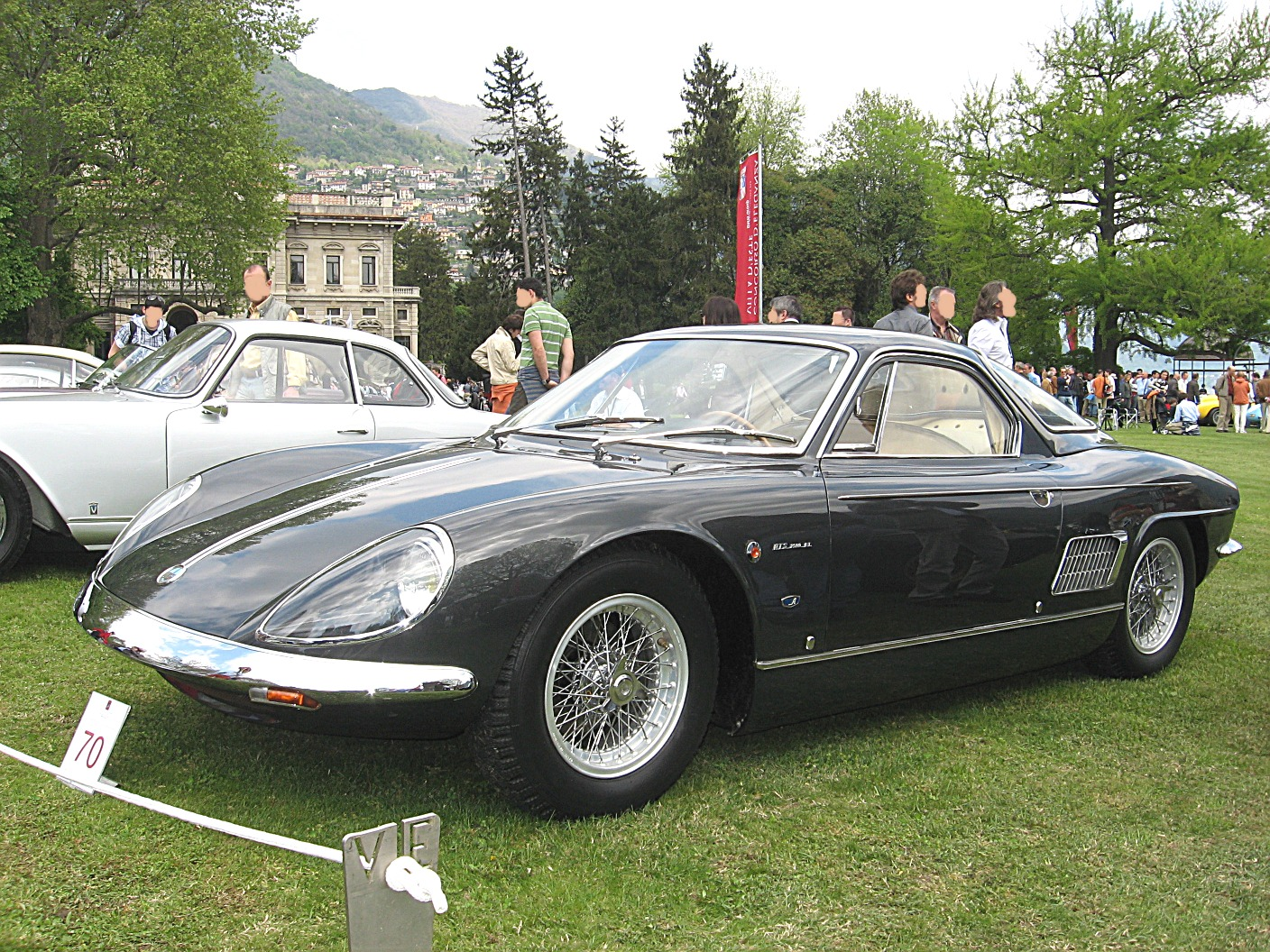
1963 ATS 2500 GT was the first Italian sports car to have a mid-engine layout.

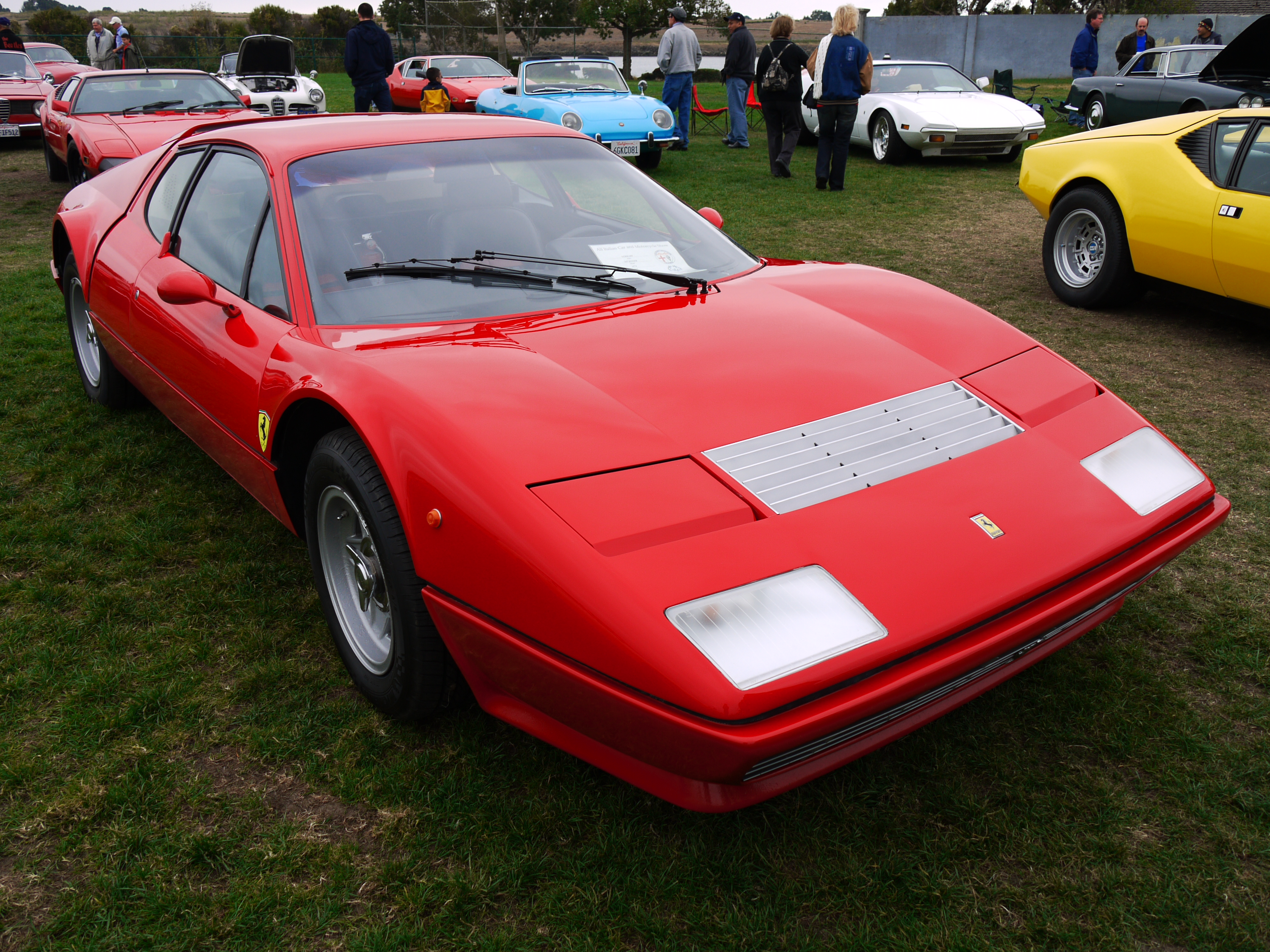
The 1973 365 GT4 BB, Ferrari's first mid-engined GT car

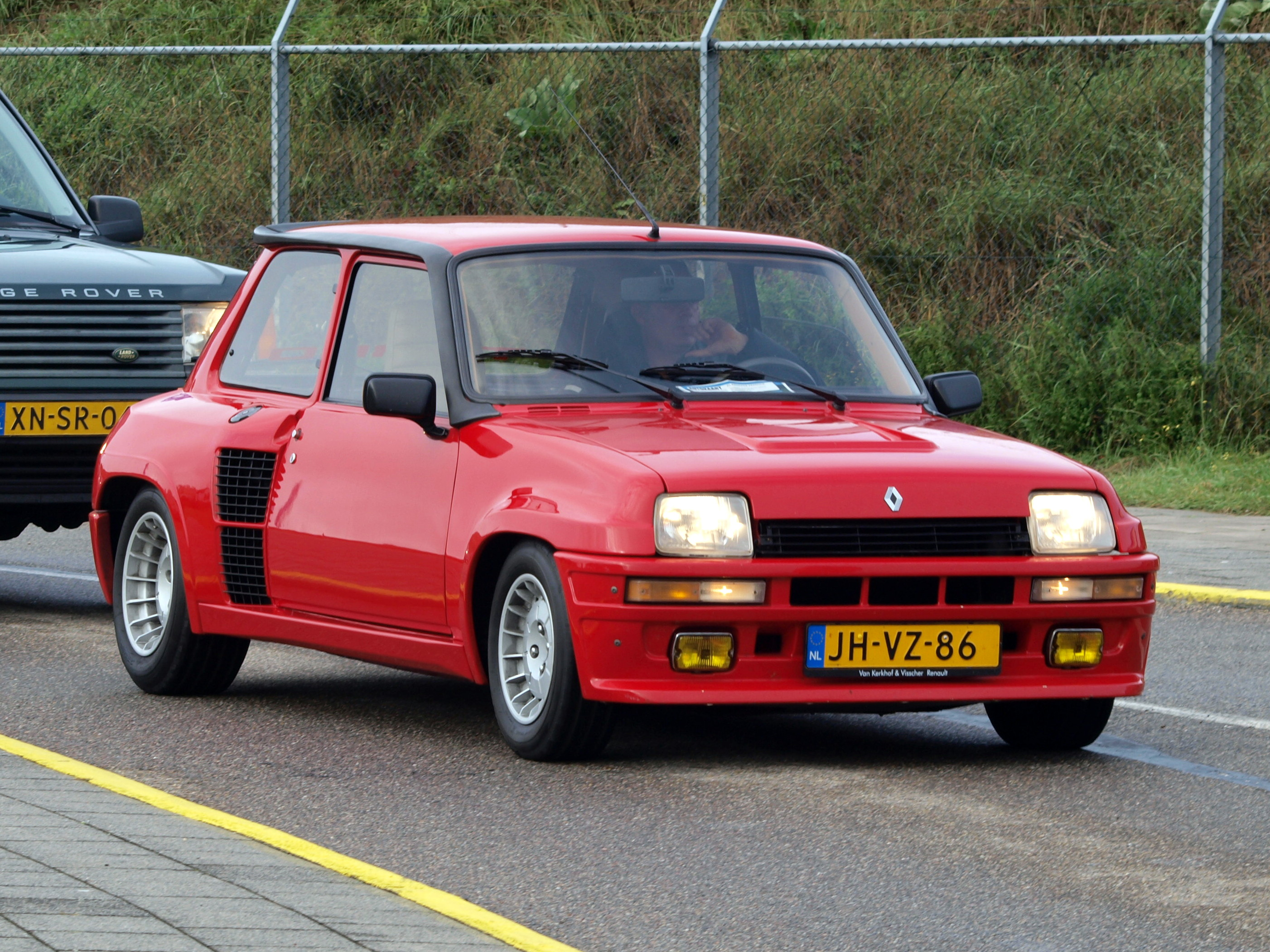
Renault 5 Turbo, a mid-engine version of the Renault 5

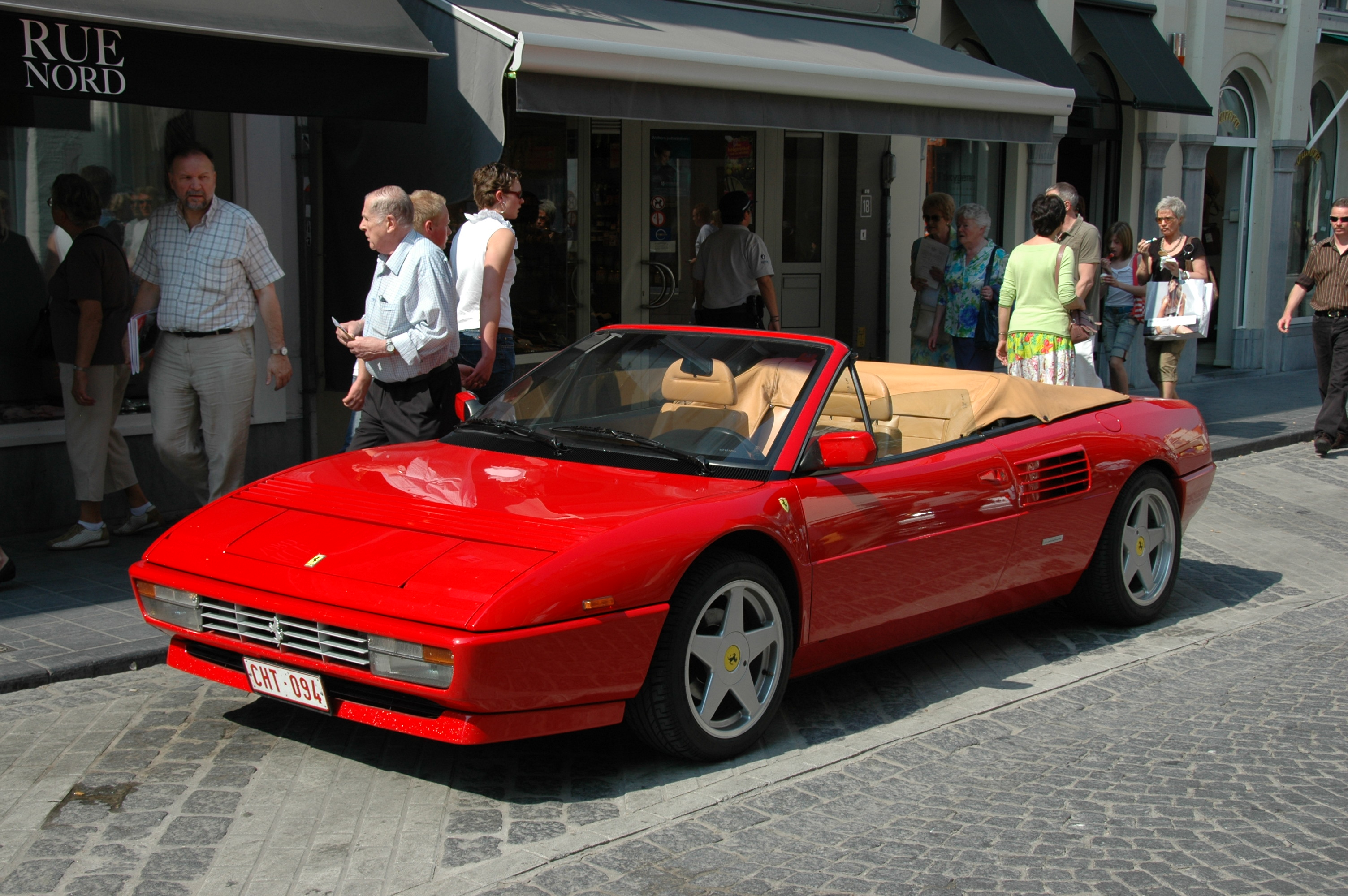
The Ferrari Mondial t, a production 4 seat mid-engined longitudinally-mounted, convertible

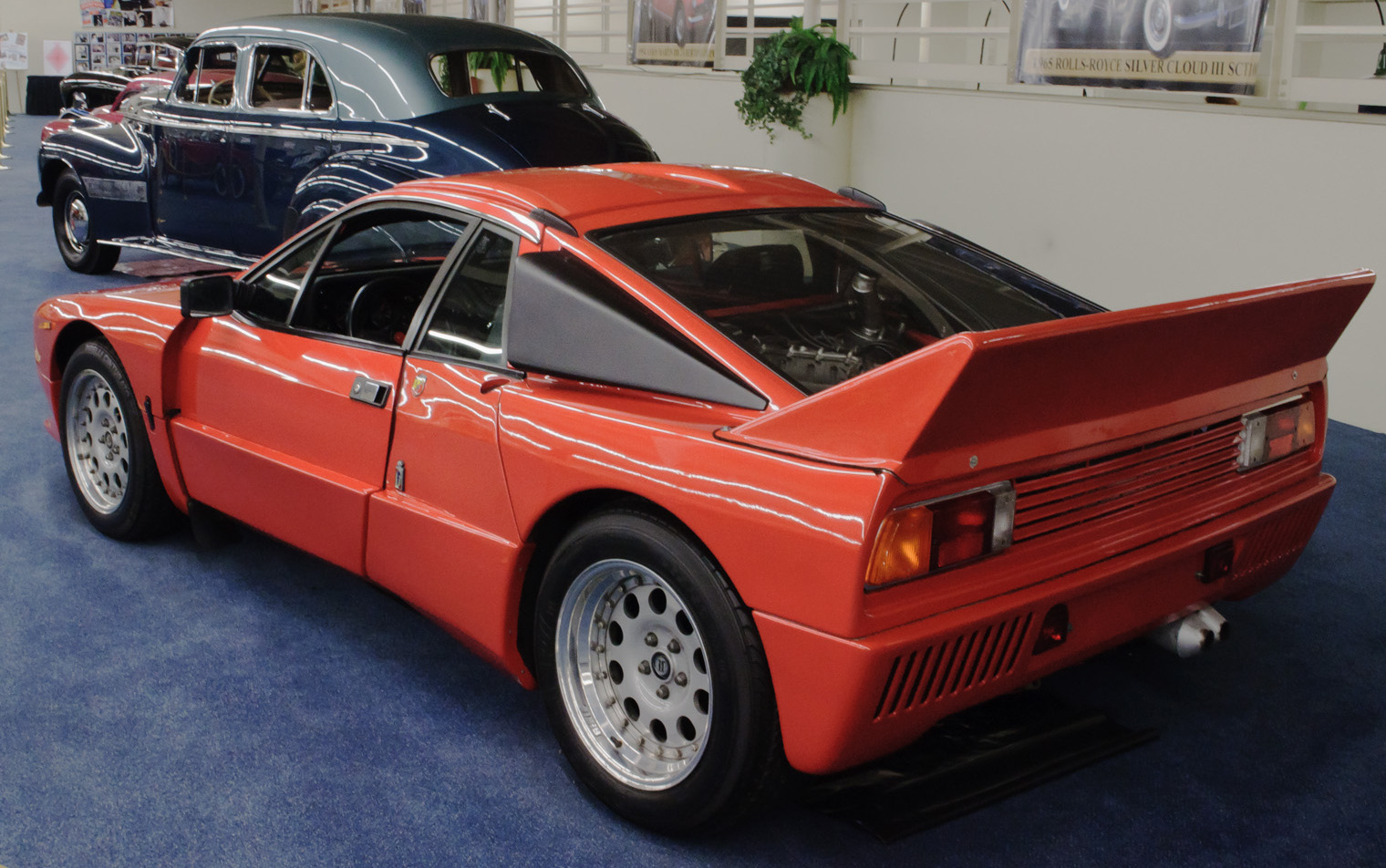
Fiat's Lancia Rally 037, early 1980s Lancia Rally fastbacks

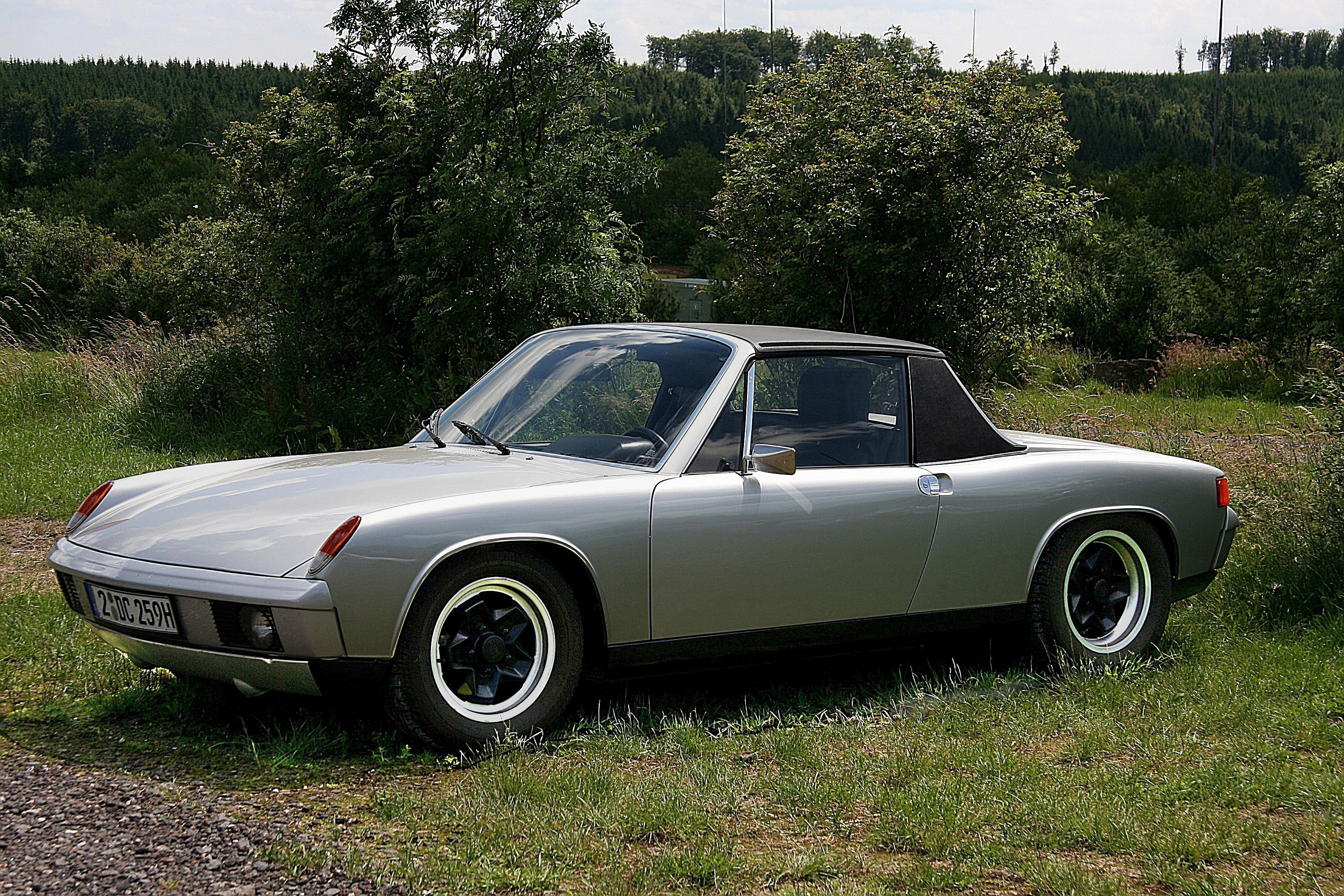
Porsche 914 shared VW mechanicals and was sold in Europe as the VW-Porsche 914.

The Porsche 718 Boxster and Cayman (982) are Porsche's most recent mid-engined sports cars.

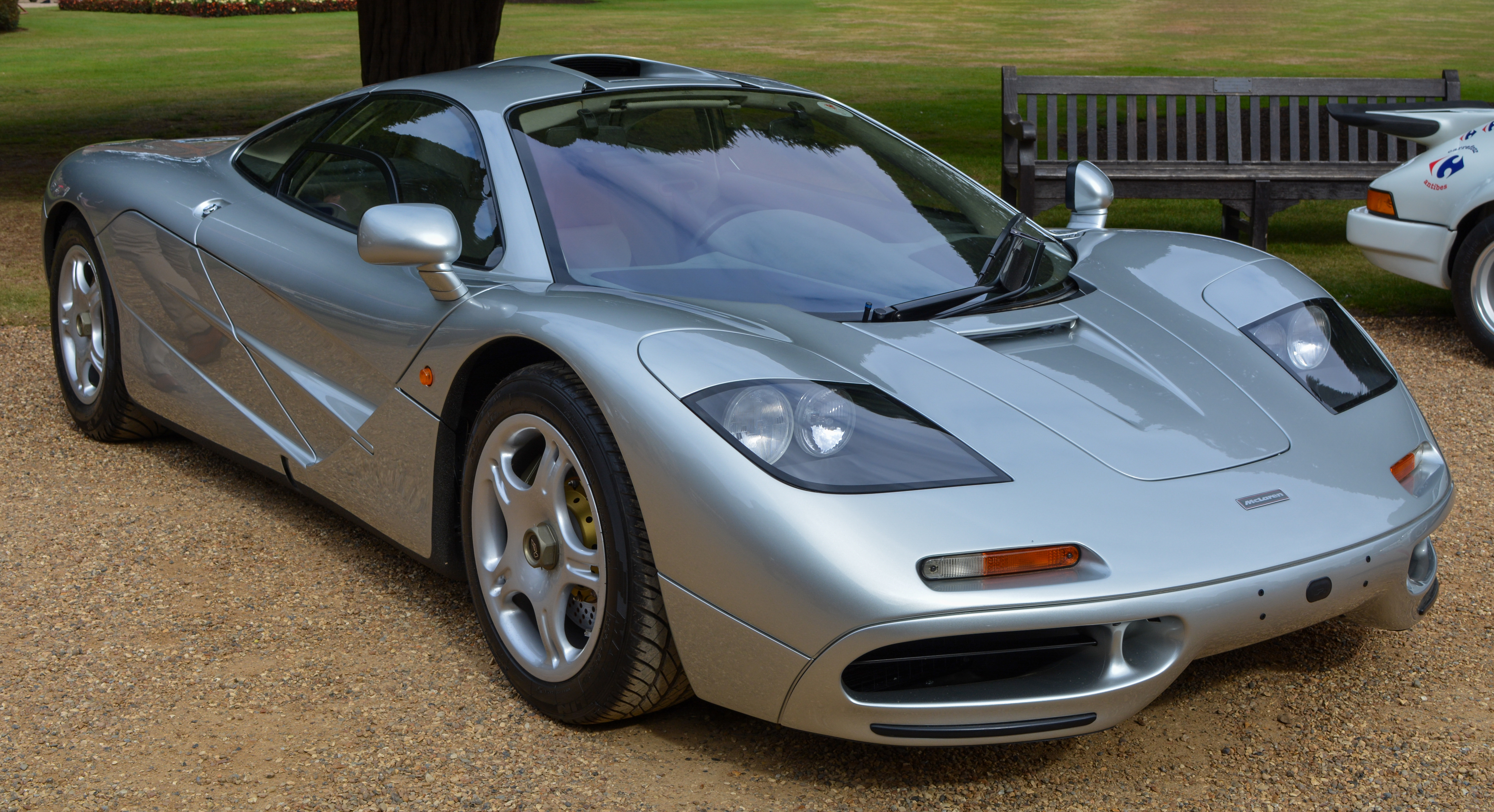
McLaren F1 – during its production run, the fastest production car available

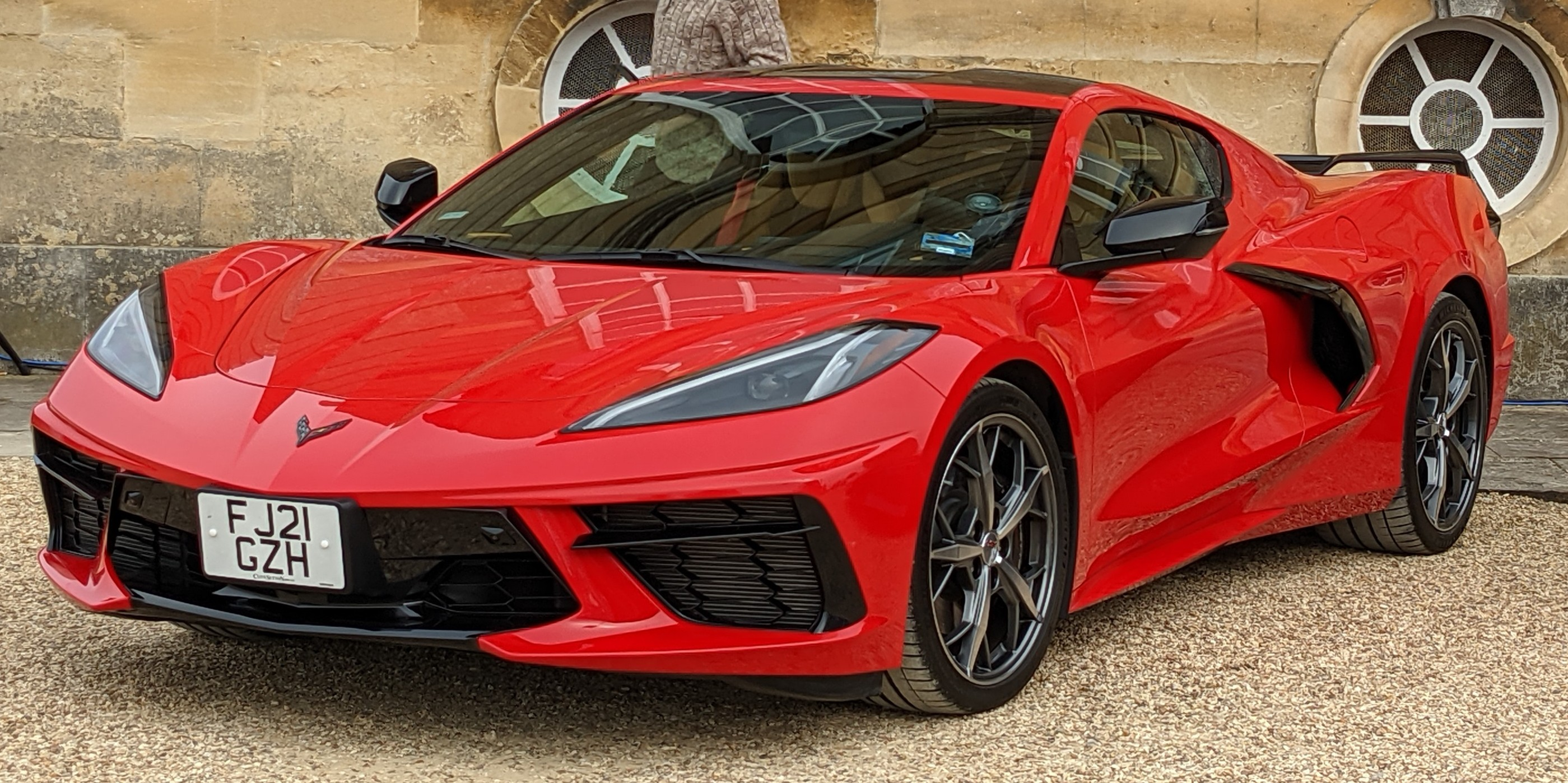
For its 8th generation, the Chevrolet Corvette switched from front-engine to mid-engine.
