= BRM P25 =

Formula One racing car

BRM Type 25
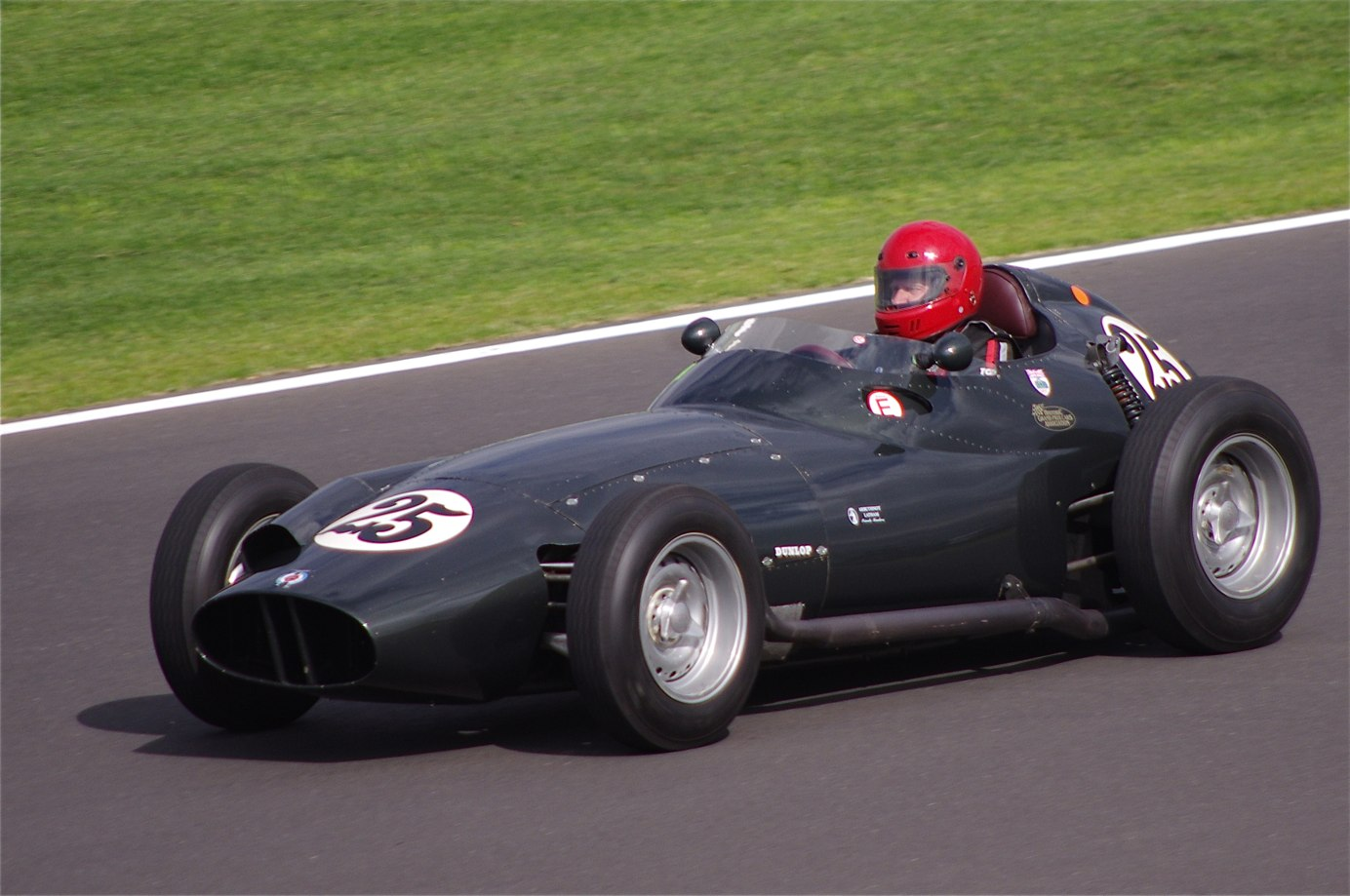
- Category: Formula One
- Constructor: British Racing Motors
- Designers: Stewart Tresilian; Tony Rudd
- Predecessor: BRM P30
- Successor: BRM P48

Technical specifications
- Chassis: Steel box-section ladder.
- Suspension (front): Porsche-type trailing arms, with Lockheed air struts.
- Suspension (rear): de Dion tube, with Lockheed air struts.
- Wheelbase: 90 in (228.6 cm)
- Engine: BRM 25 2,491 cc (152.0 cu in) Inline-four, Normally aspirated, front-mounted.
- Transmission: BRM 4-speed, transverse shaft. ZF differential.
- Weight: 1,521 lb (689.9 kg) (Unladen)
- Fuel: Petrol/alcohol mix.
- Tyres: Dunlop.

Competition history
- Notable entrants: Owen Racing Organisation
- Notable drivers: (United Kingdom) Mike Hawthorn (United Kingdom) Tony Brooks (France) Jean Behra (United States) Harry Schell (Sweden) Joakim Bonnier (United Kingdom) Graham Hill
- Debut: 1956 British Grand Prix
Races	Wins	Poles	F/Laps
25	1	1	1

The BRM P25 was a Formula One racing car raced from 1956 to 1960 and the second car produced by the British Racing Motors consortium. After the failure of the complex BRM V16, the P25's design emphasized simplicity. The car was fitted with a 2.5-litre straight-4 engine, producing some 275 horsepower. The P25 would be the foundation of BRM's successes in the late 1950s and early 1960s.

== Development ==
With BRM in financial trouble after the V16 experiment, Alfred Owen purchased the team and set work on a new car. While the car was being developed, BRM ran a privateer Maserati 250F through the 1954 and 1955 seasons. Stewart Tresilian and Tony Rudd designed an entirely new twin-cam 2.5-litre four-cylinder for the P25. The engine's large bore allowed for larger valves to be fitted. In an exception to keeping with BRM's all-British supply policy, two Weber carburetors were fitted. The engine was mounted to a simple ladder frame steel chassis, with a centre tub monocoque section. The P25 used Lockheed disc brakes at the front wheels, which would later be replaced by Dunlop discs. Uniquely, a single brake disc was fitted to the gearbox at the rear.

== Racing record ==
The P25 began racing in non-championship events in September 1955. The car's horsepower proved to be its strong suit, but its handling and reliability problems were quickly revealed. Three Type 25s were entered for Tony Brooks, Mike Hawthorn, and Ron Flockhart in the model's world championship debut, the 1956 British Grand Prix. However, none finished. Reliability woes would plague the team during the P25's early development. The large valves were prone to letting debris into the engine, and the single rear disc often failed. A P25 would not finish a Grand Prix until Harry Schell's fifth place in the 1958 Monaco Grand Prix. Schell and Jean Behra would finish 2nd and 3rd in that year's Dutch Grand Prix. They were the first podiums for BRM. Four more points finishes from Behra, Schell, and new-hire Joakim Bonnier placed BRM 4th in the inaugural Constructor's Championship. Bonnier took his and BRM's first victory at the 1959 Dutch Grand Prix. With the P25 running reliably, BRM was able to secure 3rd in the Constructor's Championship. Just as the P25 became reliable, Cooper started the rear-engine revolution and quickly rendered front engined cars such as the P25 obsolete. BRM began work on a rear engined model, the P48 not long after Bonnier's victory. The P48 would replace the P25 midway through the 1960 season.

In addition to the factory entries, the British Racing Partnership ran a P25 for Stirling Moss and Hans Herrmann in 1959. Moss scored a 2nd place in the British Grand Prix before the car was destroyed in a massive accident during the German Grand Prix with Hermann at the wheel.

== Complete Formula One World Championship results ==
Year	Entrant	Engine	Tyres	Drivers	1	2	3	4	5	6	7	8	9	10	11	Points	WCC
1956	Owen Racing Organisation	BRM P25 2.5 L4	D		ARG	MON	500	BEL	FRA	GBR	GER	ITA				n/a*	n/a*
1956	Owen Racing Organisation	BRM P25 2.5 L4	D	Mike Hawthorn		DNS				Ret						n/a*	n/a*
1956	Owen Racing Organisation	BRM P25 2.5 L4	D	Tony Brooks		DNS				Ret						n/a*	n/a*
1956	Owen Racing Organisation	BRM P25 2.5 L4	D	Ron Flockhart						Ret						n/a*	n/a*
1957	Owen Racing Organisation	BRM P25 2.5 L4	D		ARG	MON	500	FRA	GBR	GER	PES	ITA				n/a*	n/a*
1957	Owen Racing Organisation	BRM P25 2.5 L4	D	Ron Flockhart		Ret		Ret								n/a*	n/a*
1957	Owen Racing Organisation	BRM P25 2.5 L4	D	Roy Salvadori		DNQ										n/a*	n/a*
1957	Owen Racing Organisation	BRM P25 2.5 L4	D	Herbert MacKay-Fraser				Ret								n/a*	n/a*
1957	Owen Racing Organisation	BRM P25 2.5 L4	D	Jack Fairman					Ret							n/a*	n/a*
1957	Owen Racing Organisation	BRM P25 2.5 L4	D	Les Leston					Ret							n/a*	n/a*
1958	Owen Racing Organisation	BRM P25 2.5 L4	D		ARG	MON	NED	500	BEL	FRA	GBR	GER	POR	ITA	MOR	18	4th
1958	Owen Racing Organisation	BRM P25 2.5 L4	D	Harry Schell		5	2		5	Ret	5	Ret	6	Ret	Ret	18	4th
1958	Owen Racing Organisation	BRM P25 2.5 L4	D	Jean Behra		Ret	3		Ret	Ret	Ret	Ret	4	Ret	Ret	18	4th
1958	Owen Racing Organisation	BRM P25 2.5 L4	D	Maurice Trintignant						Ret						18	4th
1958	Owen Racing Organisation	BRM P25 2.5 L4	D	Joakim Bonnier										Ret	4	18	4th
1958	Owen Racing Organisation	BRM P25 2.5 L4	D	Ron Flockhart											Ret	18	4th
1959	Owen Racing Organisation	BRM P25 2.5 L4	D		MON	500	NED	FRA	GBR	GER	POR	ITA	USA			18	3rd
1959	Owen Racing Organisation	BRM P25 2.5 L4	D	Harry Schell	Ret		Ret	7	4	7	5	7				18	3rd
1959	Owen Racing Organisation	BRM P25 2.5 L4	D	Ron Flockhart	Ret			6	Ret		7	13				18	3rd
1959	Owen Racing Organisation	BRM P25 2.5 L4	D	Joakim Bonnier	Ret		1	Ret	Ret	5	Ret	8				18	3rd
1959	British Racing Partnership	BRM P25 2.5 L4	D	Stirling Moss				DSQ	2							18	3rd
1959	British Racing Partnership	BRM P25 2.5 L4	D	Hans Herrmann						Ret						18	3rd
1960	Owen Racing Organisation	BRM P25 2.5 L4	D		ARG	MON	500	NED	BEL	FRA	GBR	POR	ITA	USA		8**	4th
1960	Owen Racing Organisation	BRM P25 2.5 L4	D	Graham Hill	Ret											8**	4th
1960	Owen Racing Organisation	BRM P25 2.5 L4	D	Joakim Bonnier	7											8**	4th

* The World Constructors' Championship was not awarded before 1958.
** All points scored using the BRM P48
