= Stirling Moss =

British racing driver (1929–2020)

Sir Stirling Moss OBE
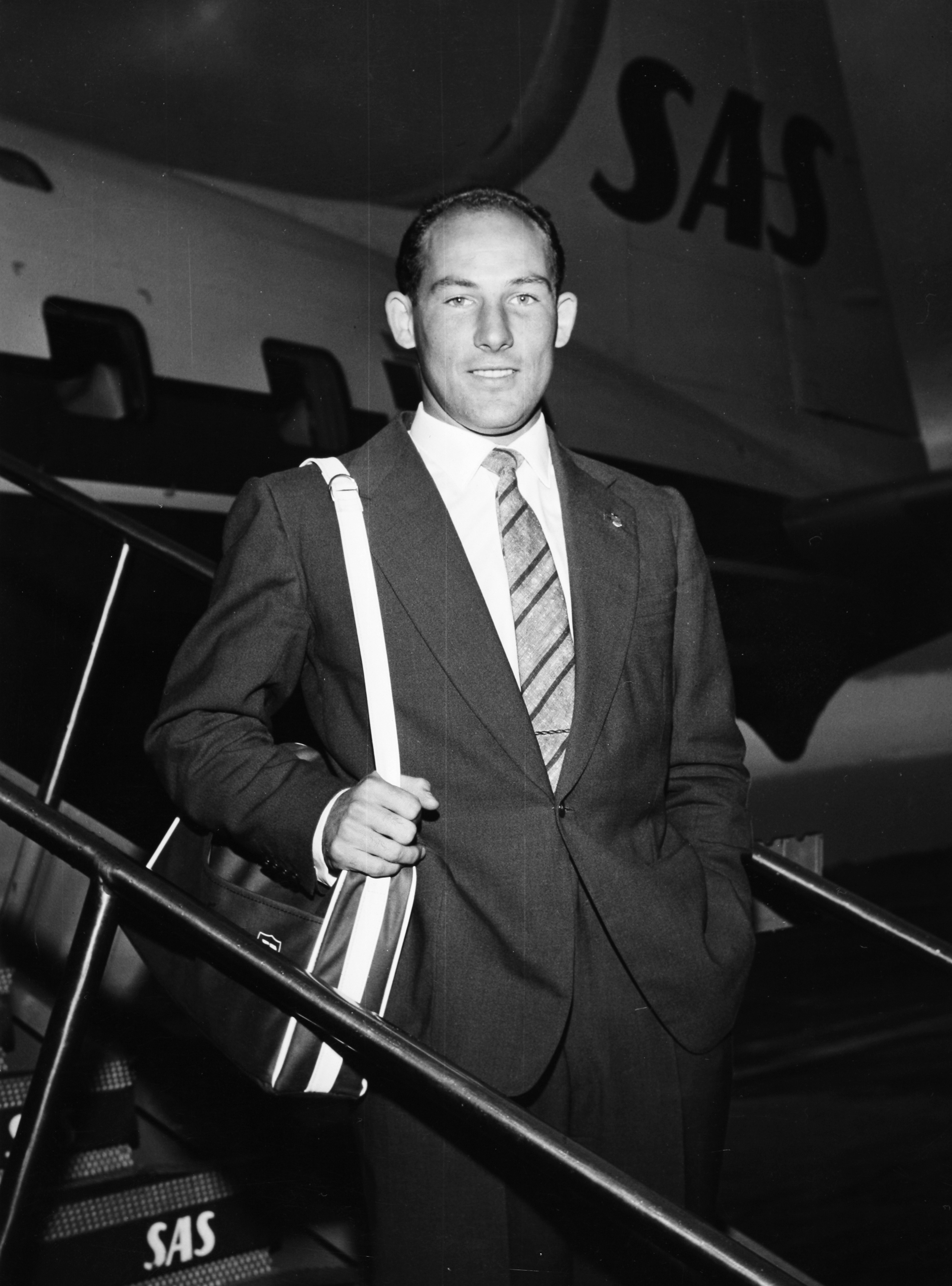
- Moss in 1958
- Born: Stirling Craufurd Moss; 17 September 1929; West Kensington, London, England
- Died: 12 April 2020 (aged 90); Mayfair, London, England
- Spouses: Katie Molson (m. 1957; div. 1960) Elaine Barbarino (m. 1964; div. 1968) Susie Paine (m. 1980)
- Children: 2
- Parent: Alfred Moss (father)
- Relatives: Pat Moss (sister); Erik Carlsson (brother-in-law)

Formula One World Championship career
- Nationality: (United Kingdom) British
- Active years: 1951–1961
- Team(s): HWM, ERA, Connaught, Cooper, privateer Maserati, Maserati, Mercedes, Vanwall, Walker, BRP
- Entries: 67 (66 starts)
- Championships: 0
- Wins: 16
- Podiums: 24
- Career points: 185 9/14 (186 9/14) (Note: Up until 1990, not all points scored by a driver contributed to their final World Championship tally (see list of points scoring systems for more information). Numbers without parentheses are Championship points; numbers in parentheses are total points scored.)
- Pole positions: 16
- Fastest laps: 19
- First entry: 1951 Swiss Grand Prix
- First win: 1955 British Grand Prix
- Last win: 1961 German Grand Prix
- Last entry: 1961 United States Grand Prix

World Sportscar Championship career
- Years active: 1953–1962
- Teams: Jaguar, O.S.C.A., Austin-Healey, Mercedes, Maserati, Porsche, Aston Martin, Lister, Camoradi, NART
- Starts: 39
- Wins: 12
- Podiums: 17
- Poles: 4 (Note: Until the mid-1960s, grid positions at the majority of World Sportscar Championship events were determined by engine capacity.)
- Fastest laps: 6

24 Hours of Le Mans career
- Years: 1951–1959, 1961
- Teams: Jaguar, Mercedes, Aston Martin, Maserati, NART
- Best finish: 2nd (1953, 1956)
- Class wins: 1 (1956)

Sir Stirling Craufurd Moss (17 September 1929 – 12 April 2020) was a British racing driver and broadcaster who competed in Formula One from 1951 to 1961. Widely regarded as one of the greatest drivers to never win the Formula One World Drivers' Championship, (Note: Per several sources:) Moss won a record 212 official races across several motorsport disciplines, including 16 Formula One Grands Prix. In endurance racing, Moss won the 12 Hours of Sebring in 1954, as well as the Mille Miglia in 1955 with Mercedes.

Born and raised in London, Moss was the son of amateur racing driver Alfred Moss and the older brother of rally driver Pat. Aged nine, Alfred bought him an Austin 7, which he raced around the field of the family's country house. Initially an equestrian, Moss used his winnings from horse riding competitions to purchase a Cooper 500 in 1948. He was immediately successful in motor racing, taking several wins in Formula Three at national and international levels, prior to his first major victory at the RAC Tourist Trophy in 1950, driving a Jaguar XK120. Moss made his Formula One debut at the 1951 Swiss Grand Prix with HWM, making several intermittent appearances before moving to Maserati in 1954, where he achieved his maiden podium at the Belgian Grand Prix. Moss joined Mercedes in 1955, taking his maiden win at the British Grand Prix as he finished runner-up in the championship to career rival Juan Manuel Fangio.

Moss again finished runner-up to Fangio in 1956 and 1957 with Maserati and Vanwall, winning multiple Grands Prix across both seasons. He took four wins in his 1958 campaign, but lost out on the title again to Mike Hawthorn by one point. From 1959 to 1961, Moss competed for Walker, taking multiple wins in each as he finished third in the World Drivers' Championship three times. Moss retired from motor racing in 1962, after an accident at the non-championship Glover Trophy left him in a coma for a month and temporarily paralysed. He achieved 16 wins, 16 pole positions, 19 fastest laps and 24 podium finishes in Formula One, the former of which remains the record for a non–World Drivers' Champion. Moss was a three-time winner of the Monaco Grand Prix, four-time winner of the British Empire Trophy, and five-time winner of the International Gold Cup. He also contested the World Sportscar Championship from 1953 to 1962, winning 12 races with various manufacturers. In rallying, Moss finished runner-up at the Monte Carlo Rally in 1952. Throughout his career, he broke several land speed records across different categories.

In British popular culture, Moss was a widely recognised public figure, with his name becoming synonymous with speed in the mid-20th century. He made several media appearances, including in the James Bond film Casino Royale (1967), and was named BBC Sports Personality of the Year in 1961. Upon retiring from motor racing, Moss established a career as a commentator and pundit for ABC. Moss was inducted into the International Motorsports Hall of Fame in 1990.

== Early life ==
Moss was born in London to amateur racing drivers Alfred and Aileen Moss (née Craufurd). His grandfather was Jewish and from a family that changed their surname from Moses to Moss. He was brought up at Long White Cloud house on the south bank of the River Thames. His father was an amateur racing driver, who had come 16th in the 1924 Indianapolis 500, and his mother had also been involved in motorsport, entering into hillclimbs at the wheel of a Singer Nine. Moss was a gifted horse rider, as was his younger sister, Pat Moss, who went on to become a successful rally driver.

Moss was educated at several independent schools: Shrewsbury House School, Clewer Manor Junior School, and Haileybury and Imperial Service College. He disliked school and did not get good grades. At Haileybury, he was subjected to bullying due to his Jewish roots. He concealed the bullying from his parents and used it as "motivation to succeed". Moss received his first car, an Austin 7, from his father at the age of nine and drove it on the fields around Long White Cloud. He purchased his own car at age 15 after he obtained a driving licence.

== Racing career ==
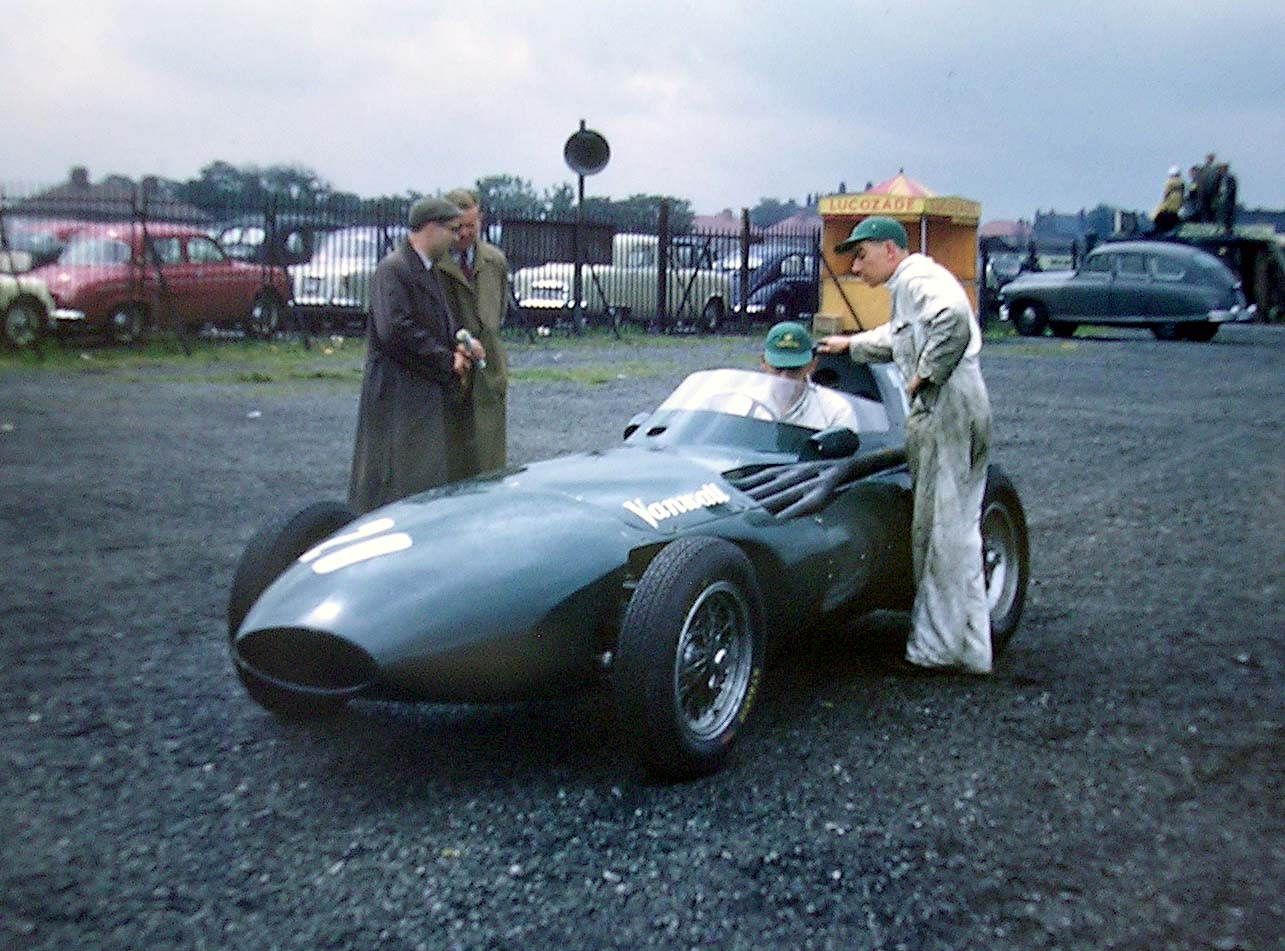
Moss shared this Vanwall VW5 with Tony Brooks to win the 1957 British Grand Prix.

Moss raced from 1948 to 1962, winning 212 of the 529 races he entered, including 16 Formula One Grands Prix. He competed in as many as 62 races in one year and drove 84 different makes of car over the course of his career. He preferred to race British cars, stating: "It is better to lose honourably in a British car than to win in a foreign one." At Vanwall, he was instrumental in breaking the German and Italian stranglehold on F1. He kept his record of the most Formula One Grand Prix victories by an English driver until 1991, when Nigel Mansell overtook him.

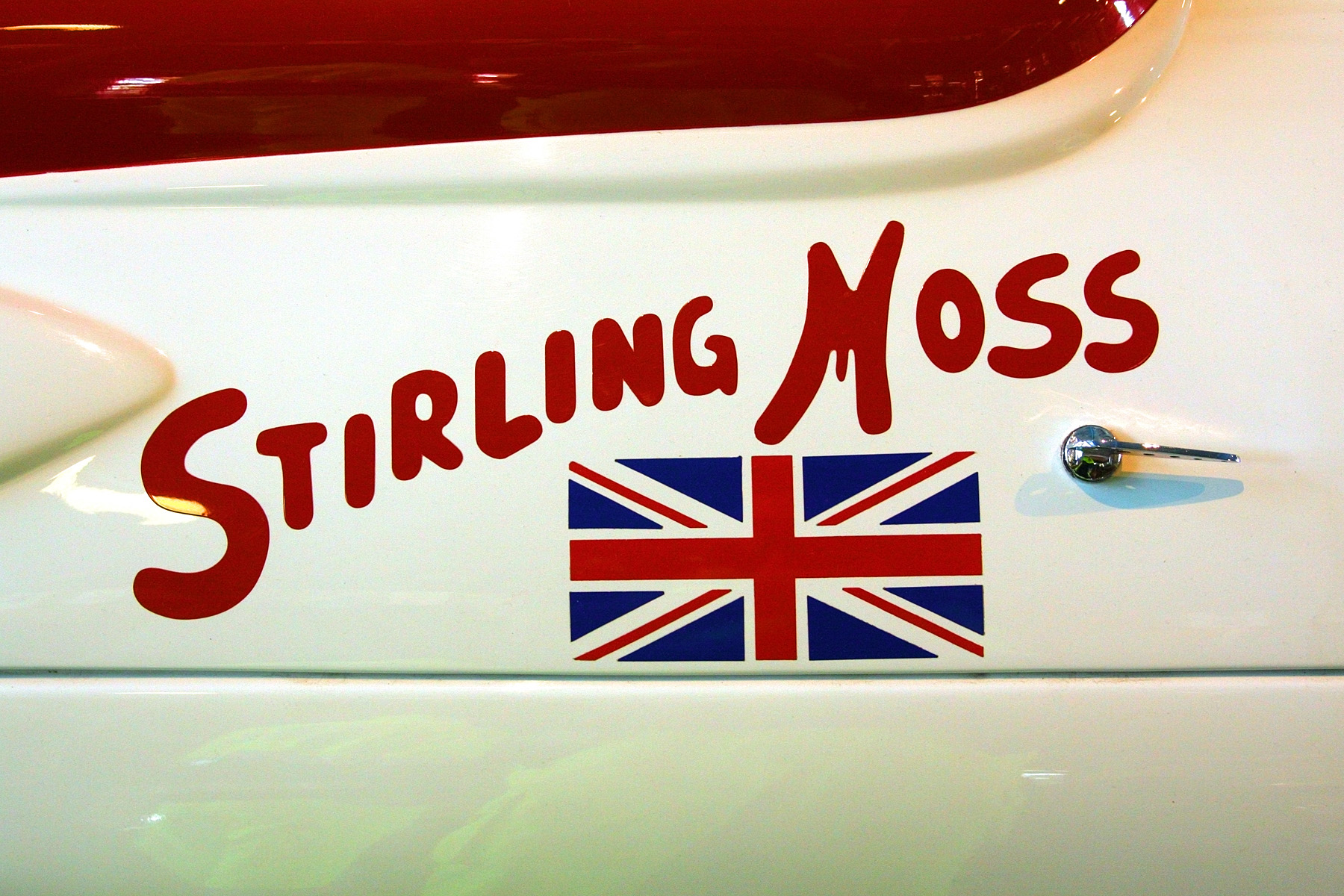
"Stirling Moss" script and a British flag on a 1958 Maserati 420M/58 he raced in the Race of Two Worlds on Monza. The very same script was printed on the Maserati MC20 prototype in honour of the driver.

=== 1948–1954 ===
Moss began his career at the wheel of his father's 328 BMW, DPX 653. Moss was one of the Cooper Car Company's first customers, using winnings from competing in horse-riding events to pay the deposit on a Cooper 500 in 1948. He then persuaded his father, who opposed his son's racing career and wanted him to become a dentist, to let him buy it. He soon demonstrated his natural talent and ability with numerous wins at both the national and international levels, and continued to compete in Formula Three, with Coopers and Kiefts, after he had progressed to more senior categories.

Moss's first major international race victory came on the eve of his 21st birthday at the wheel of a Jaguar XK120 in the 1950 RAC Tourist Trophy in Northern Ireland. He went on to win the race six more times, in 1951 (with a Jaguar C-Type), 1955 (with a Mercedes-Benz 300 SLR), 1958 and 1959 (with an Aston Martin DBR1), and 1960 and 1961 (with a Ferrari 250 GT). Enzo Ferrari, the founder of Ferrari, approached Moss and offered him a Formula Two car to drive at the 1951 Bari Grand Prix before a full-season in 1952. Moss and his father went to Apulia only to find out that the Ferrari car was to be driven by Piero Taruffi and were incensed.

Also a competent rally driver, Moss was one of three people to have won a Coupe d'Or for three consecutive penalty-free runs on the Alpine Rally. He finished second in the 1952 Monte Carlo Rally; driving a Sunbeam-Talbot 90 with Desmond Scannell and John Cooper as his co-drivers. In 1954, he became the first non-American to win the 12 Hours of Sebring, sharing the Cunningham team's 1.5-litre O.S.C.A. MT4 with Bill Lloyd.

In 1953, Mercedes-Benz racing boss Alfred Neubauer had spoken to Moss's manager, Ken Gregory, about the possibility of Moss's joining Mercedes. Having seen him do well in a relatively noncompetitive car, and wanting to see how he would perform in a better one, Neubauer suggested that Moss buy a Maserati for the 1954 season. He bought a Maserati 250F, and although the car's unreliability prevented him from scoring high amounts of points in the 1954 Drivers' Championship, he qualified alongside the Mercedes front runners several times and performed well in the races. He achieved his first Formula One victory when he won the Oulton Park International Gold Cup.

In the Italian Grand Prix, Moss passed both drivers who were regarded as the best in Formula One at the time – Juan Manuel Fangio in his Mercedes and Alberto Ascari in his Ferrari – and took the lead of the race. Ascari retired with engine problems, and Moss led until lap 68, when his engine also failed. Fangio took the victory, and Moss had to push his Maserati to the finish line. Neubauer, already impressed when Moss had tested a Mercedes-Benz W196 at Hockenheim, promptly signed him for the 1955 season.

=== 1955 ===
Moss's first World Championship victory came at the 1955 British Grand Prix, a race he was also the first British driver to win. Leading a 1–2–3–4 finish for Mercedes, it was the first time he had beaten Fangio, his teammate, rival, friend and mentor. It has been suggested that Fangio allowed Moss to win in front of his home crowd. Moss himself asked Fangio this repeatedly, and Fangio would always reply with: "No. You were just better than me that day." The same year, Moss also won the RAC Tourist Trophy, the Targa Florio (with Peter Collins), and the Mille Miglia.

==== Mille Miglia ====
In 1955, Moss won Italy's one-thousand-mile Mille Miglia road race, an achievement that Doug Nye described as the "most iconic single day's drive in motor racing history". His co-driver was motor racing journalist Denis Jenkinson, who prepared a set of pace notes for Moss; the two worked out a set of hand signals to be able to communicate over the roar of the engine. They completed the race in ten hours and seven minutes. Motor Trend headlined it as "The Most Epic Drive Ever". Before the race, he had taken a pill given to him by Fangio, and he has commented that although he did not know what was in it: "Dexedrine and Benzedrine were commonly used in rallies. The object was simply to keep awake, like wartime bomber crews." After the win, he spent the night and the following day driving his girlfriend to Cologne.

=== 1956–1962 ===
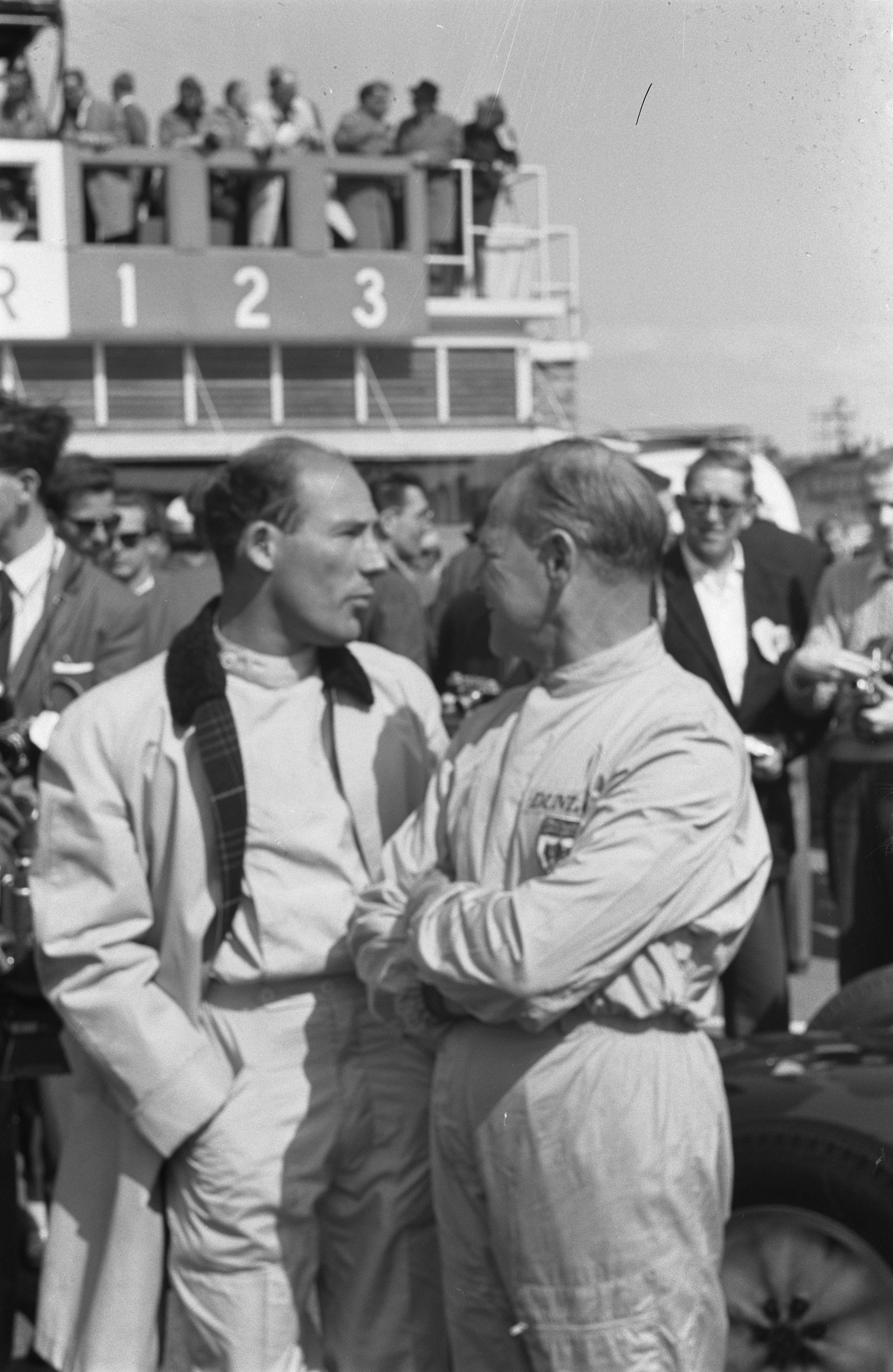
Moss (left) with Innes Ireland at the 1961 Dutch Grand Prix

Moss won the Nassau Cup at the 1956 and 1957 Bahamas Speed Week. Also in 1957 he won on the longest circuit ever to hold a Formula One Grand Prix, the 25 km (16 mi) Pescara Circuit, where, yet again, he demonstrated his mastery in long-distance racing. The event lasted three hours and Moss beat Fangio, who started from pole position, by approximately 3 minutes.

In 1958, Moss's forward-thinking attitude made waves in the racing world. Moss won the first race of the season in a rear-engined F1 car, which became the common design by 1961. At Monza that year, he raced in the Maserati 420M in the Race of Two Worlds, the first single-seater car in Europe to be sponsored by a non-racing brand – the Eldorado Ice Cream Company. This was the first case in Europe of contemporary sponsorship, with the ice-cream maker's colors replacing the ones assigned by the FIA.

Moss's sporting attitude cost him the 1958 Formula One World Championship. When rival Mike Hawthorn was threatened with a penalty after the Portuguese Grand Prix, Moss defended him. Hawthorn was accused of reversing on the track after spinning and stalling his car on an uphill section. Moss had shouted advice to Hawthorn to steer downhill, against traffic, to bump-start the car. Moss's quick thinking, and his defence of Hawthorn before the stewards, preserved Hawthorn's 6 points for finishing in second place. Hawthorn went on to beat Moss for the championship title by one point, even though he had won only one race that year to Moss's four. Moss's loss in the championship could also be attributed to an error in communication between his pit crew and the driver at one race. A point was given for the fastest lap in each race, and the crew signaled "HAWT REC", meaning that Hawthorn had set a record lap. Moss read this as "HAWT REG" and thought that Hawthorn was making regular laps, so he did not try to set a fast lap. The crew was supposed to signal the time of the lap, so Moss would know what he had to beat.

Moss was as gifted in sports cars as in Grand Prix cars. To his victories in the Tourist Trophy, the Sebring 12 Hours and the Mille Miglia he added three consecutive wins from 1958 to 1960 in the 1000 km Nürburgring, the first two in an Aston Martin (in which he did most of the driving), and the third in a Maserati Tipo 61, co-driving with Dan Gurney. The pair lost time when an oil hose blew off, but despite the wet-weather, they made up the time and took first place.

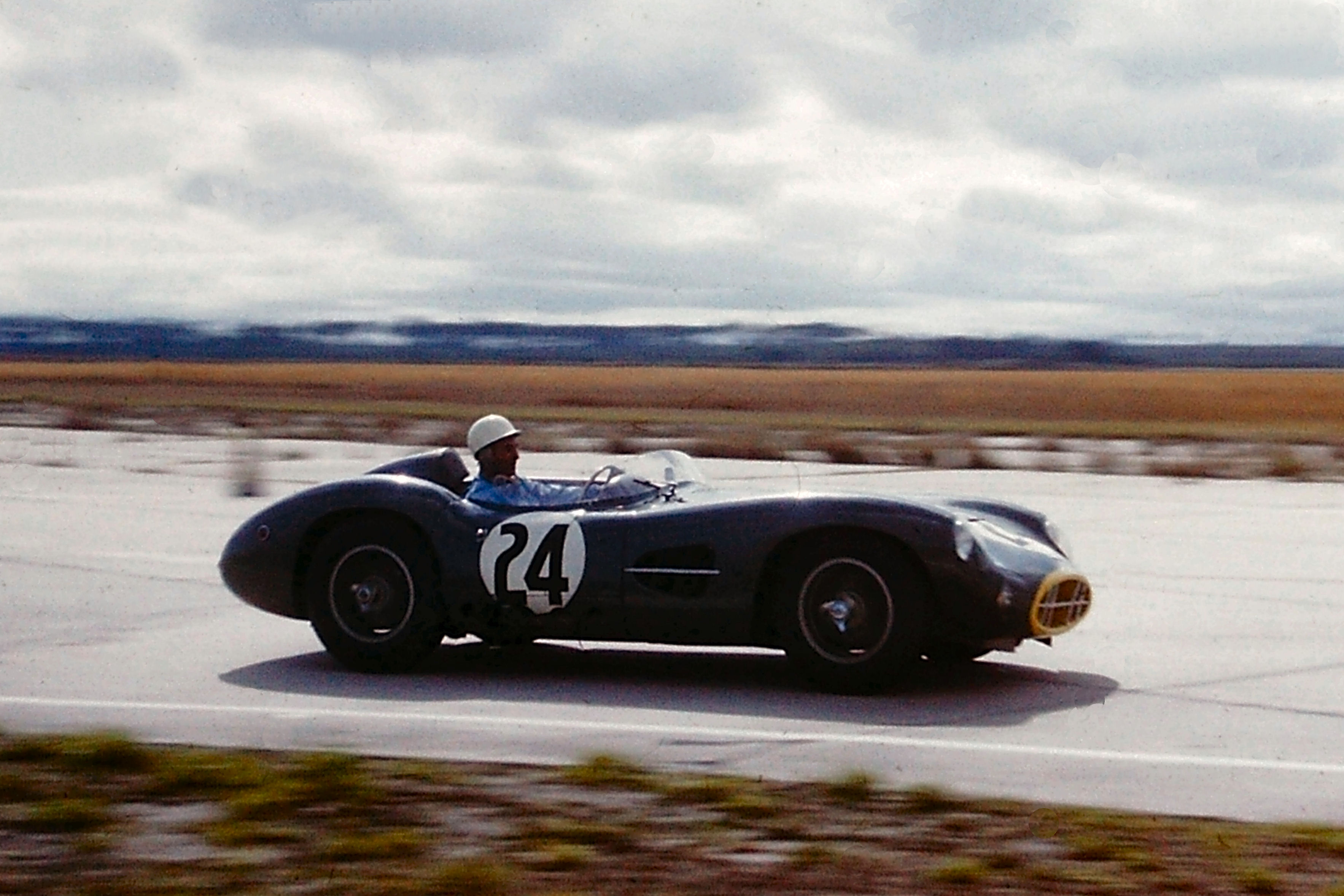
Moss racing an Aston Martin DBR1 at the 1958 12 Hours of Sebring

In the 1960 Formula One season, Moss won the Monaco Grand Prix in Rob Walker's Coventry-Climax-powered Lotus 18. Seriously injured in an accident at the Burnenville curve during practice for the Belgian Grand Prix, he missed the next three races but recovered sufficiently to win the final one of the season, the United States Grand Prix.

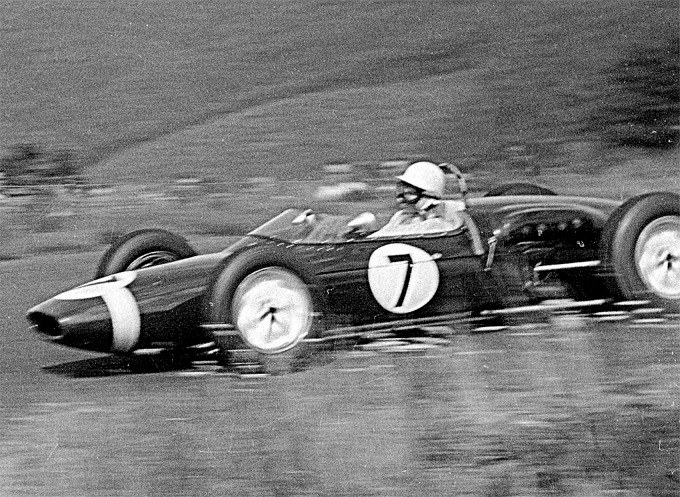
Moss in his Lotus-Climax at the 1961 German Grand Prix

For the 1961 Formula One season, run under new 1.5-litre rules, Enzo Ferrari fielded the Ferrari 156 with an all-new V6 engine. Moss's Climax-engined Lotus was comparatively underpowered, but he won the 1961 Monaco Grand Prix by 3.6 seconds, beating the Ferraris of Richie Ginther, Wolfgang von Trips, and Phil Hill, and he went on to win the 1961 German Grand Prix.

=== Career-ending crash ===
On 23 April 1962 at Goodwood Circuit, 32 year old Moss crashed his Lotus in the Glover Trophy. The accident put him in a coma for a month, and for six months the left side of his body was paralysed. He recovered but retired from professional racing after a test session in a Lotus 19 the following year, when he lapped a few tenths of a second slower than before. He felt that he had not regained his instinctive command of the car after recovering from the coma. He had been runner-up in the Drivers' Championship four years in a row, from 1955 to 1958, and third from 1959 to 1961.

== Speed records ==
=== 1950 ===
At the Autodrome de Montlhéry, a steeply banked oval track near Paris, Moss and Leslie Johnson took turns at the wheel of the latter's Jaguar XK120 to average 107.46 mph (172.94 km/h) for 24 hours, including stops for fuel and tyres. Changing drivers every three hours, they covered a total of 2,579.16 miles (4,150.76 km). It was the first time a production car had averaged over 100 mph (160.93 km/h) for 24 hours.

=== 1952 ===
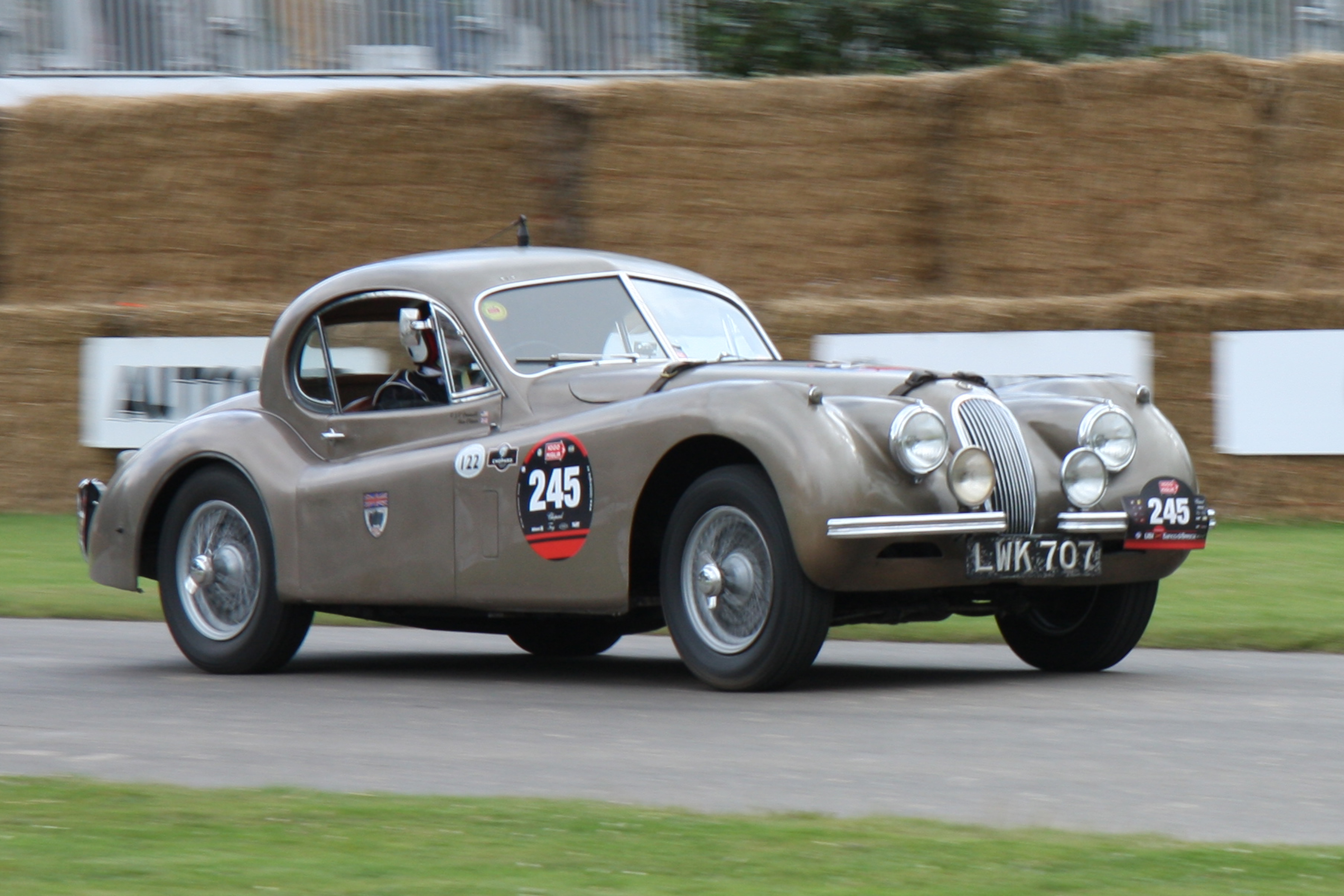
Record-breaking 1952 Jaguar XK120, seen in 2008

Revisiting Montlhéry, Moss was one of a four-driver team, led by Johnson, who drove a factory-owned Jaguar XK120 fixed-head coupé for 7 days and nights at the French track. Moss, Johnson, Bert Hadley, and Jack Fairman averaged 100.31 mph (161.43 km/h) to take four World records and five International Class C records, and covered a total of 16,851.73 mi (27,120.23 km).

=== 1957 ===
In August, Moss broke five International Class F records in the purpose-built MG EX181 at Bonneville Salt Flats. The streamlined, supercharged car's speed for the flying kilometre was 245.64 mph (395.32 km/h), which was the average of two runs in opposite directions.

== Broadcasting career ==
Away from driving, in 1962, Moss acted as a colour commentator for ABC's Wide World of Sports for Formula One and NASCAR races. He eventually left ABC in 1980. Moss narrated the official 1988 Formula One season review along with Tony Jardine.

Moss also narrated the popular children's series Roary the Racing Car, which stars Peter Kay.

== Return to racing ==
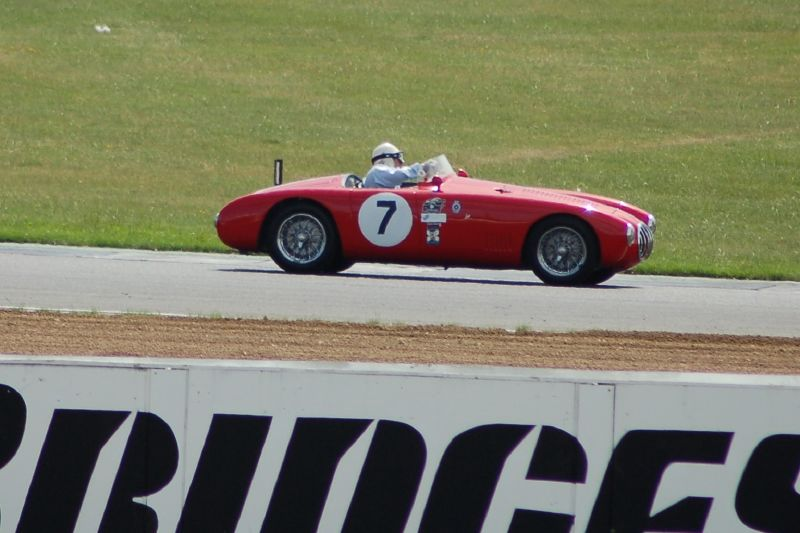
Moss racing an OSCA MT4 Spider Morelli at Speed, 2006 Silverstone Classic

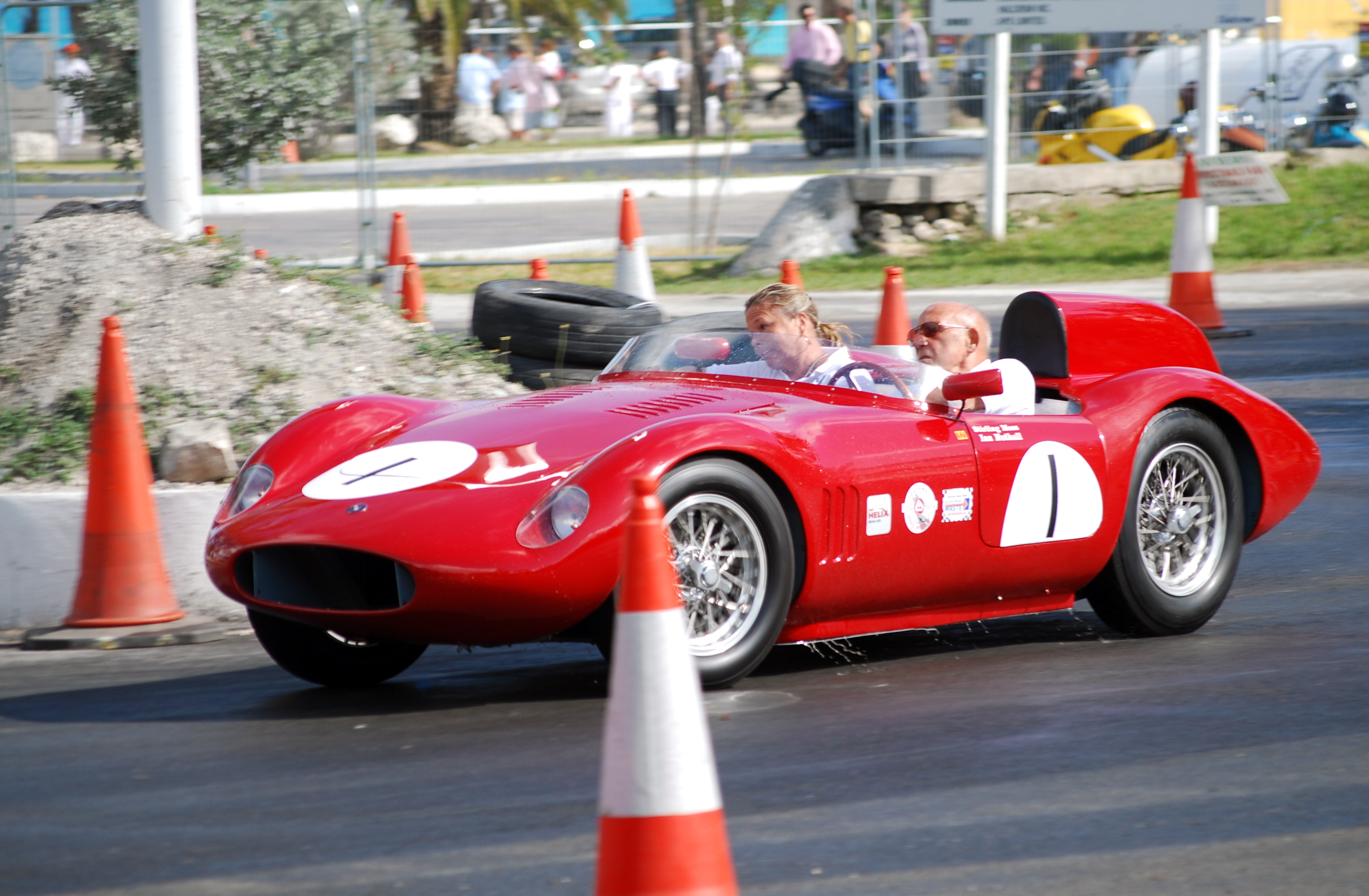
Moss demonstrating his OSCA FS 372 Spider Morelli at the 2011 Bahamas Speed Week

Although ostensibly retired from racing since 1962, Moss did make a number of one-off appearances in professional motorsport events in the following two decades. He also competed in the 1974 London-Sahara-Munich World Cup Rally in a Mercedes-Benz but retired from the event in the Algerian Sahara. The Holden Torana he shared with Jack Brabham in the 1976 Bathurst 1000 was hit from behind on the grid and eventually retired with engine failure. Moss, at the wheel of the Torana when the Holden V8 engine let go, was criticised by other drivers for staying on the racing line for over 2/3 of the 6.172 km long circuit while returning to the pits as the car was dropping large amounts of oil onto the road. He also shared a Volkswagen Golf GTI with Denny Hulme in the 1979 Benson & Hedges 500 at Pukekohe Park Raceway in New Zealand.

In 1980, Moss made a comeback to regular competition, in the British Saloon Car Championship with the works-backed GTi Engineering Audi team. For the 1980 season, Moss was the team's number-two driver to team co-owner Richard Lloyd. For the 1981 season Moss stayed with Audi, as the team moved to Tom Walkinshaw Racing management, driving alongside Martin Brundle.

Throughout his retirement he raced in events for historic cars, driving on behalf of and at the invitation of others, as well as campaigning his own OSCA FS 372 and other vehicles. In 2004, as part of its promotion for the new SLR, Mercedes-Benz reunited Moss with the 300 SLR "No. 722" in which he won the Mille Miglia nearly 50 years earlier. One reporter who rode with Moss that day noted that the 75-year-old driver was "so good ... that even old and crippled [he was] still better than nearly everyone else". On 9 June 2011 during qualifying for the Le Mans Legends race, Moss announced on Radio Le Mans that he had finally retired from racing, saying that he had scared himself that afternoon. He was 81.

== Post-racing career ==
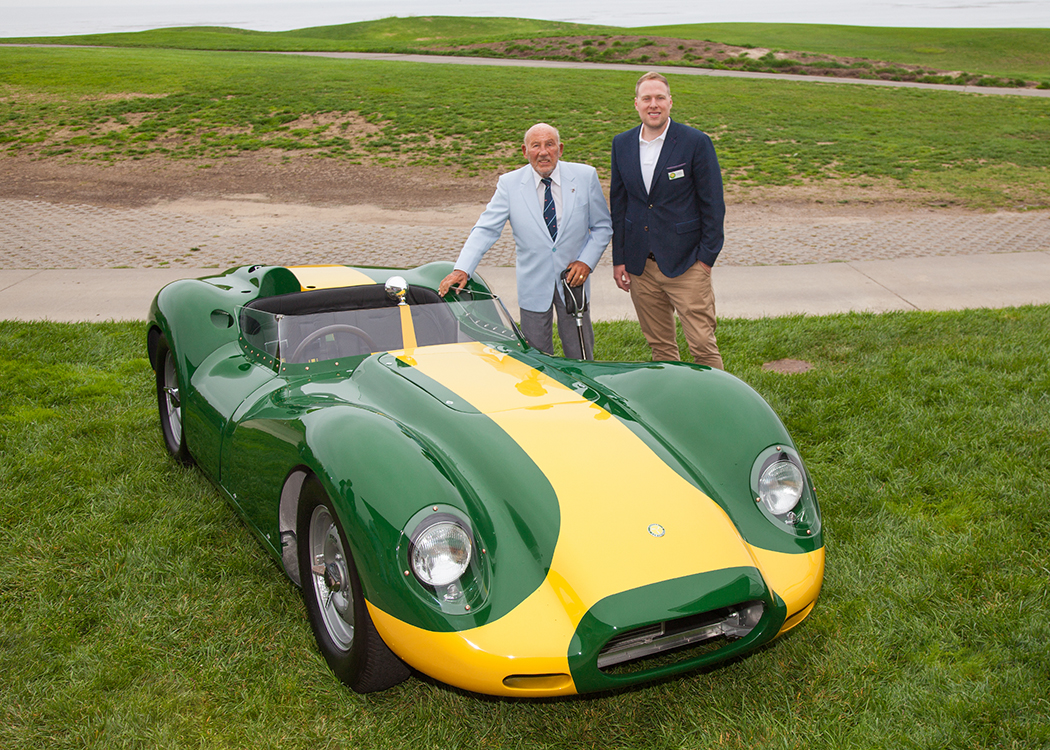
Moss with Lister Cars CEO Lawrence Whittaker

Lister Cars announced the building for sale of the Lister Knobbly Stirling Moss at the Royal Automobile Club in London in June 2016. The magnesium car is built to the exact specification of the 1958 model, and is the only car that was ever endorsed by Moss. Brian Lister invited Moss to drive for Lister on three separate occasions, at Goodwood in 1954, Silverstone in 1958 and at Sebring in 1959, and to celebrate these races, 10 special-edition lightweight Lister Knobbly cars are being built. The company announced that the cars will be available for both road and race use, and Moss would personally be handing over each car.

=== Honours ===
In 1990, Moss was inducted into the International Motorsports Hall of Fame. In the New Year Honours 2000 List, Moss was made a Knight Bachelor for services to motor racing. On 21 March 2000, he was knighted by Prince Charles, standing in for the Queen, who was on an official visit to Australia. He received the 2005 Segrave Trophy.

In 2006, Moss was awarded the FIA gold medal in recognition of his outstanding contribution to motorsport. In December 2008, McLaren-Mercedes unveiled their final model of the Mercedes-Benz SLR McLaren. The model was named in honour of Moss, hence, Mercedes McLaren SLR Stirling Moss, which has a top speed of 217 mph (349 km/h) with wind deflectors instead of a windscreen.

In 2016, in an academic paper that reported a mathematical modelling study that assessed the relative influence of driver and machine, Moss was ranked the 29th best Formula One driver of all time. Following Moss's death, the Kinrara Trophy race at the Goodwood Revival meeting was renamed in his honour. It is a race for GT cars that competed before 1963.

=== Biographies ===
In 1957, Moss published an autobiography called In the Track Of Speed, first published by Muller, London. In 1963, motorsport author and commentator Ken Purdy published a biographical book entitled All But My Life about Moss (first published by William Kimber & Co, London), based on material gathered through interviews with Moss. In 2015, when he was aged 85, Moss published a second autobiography, entitled My Racing Life, written with motor sports writer Simon Taylor. In 2016, Philip Porter published the first volume of Stirling Moss – The Definitive Biography covering the period from birth up to the end of 1955, one of Moss's greatest years.

=== Popular culture ===
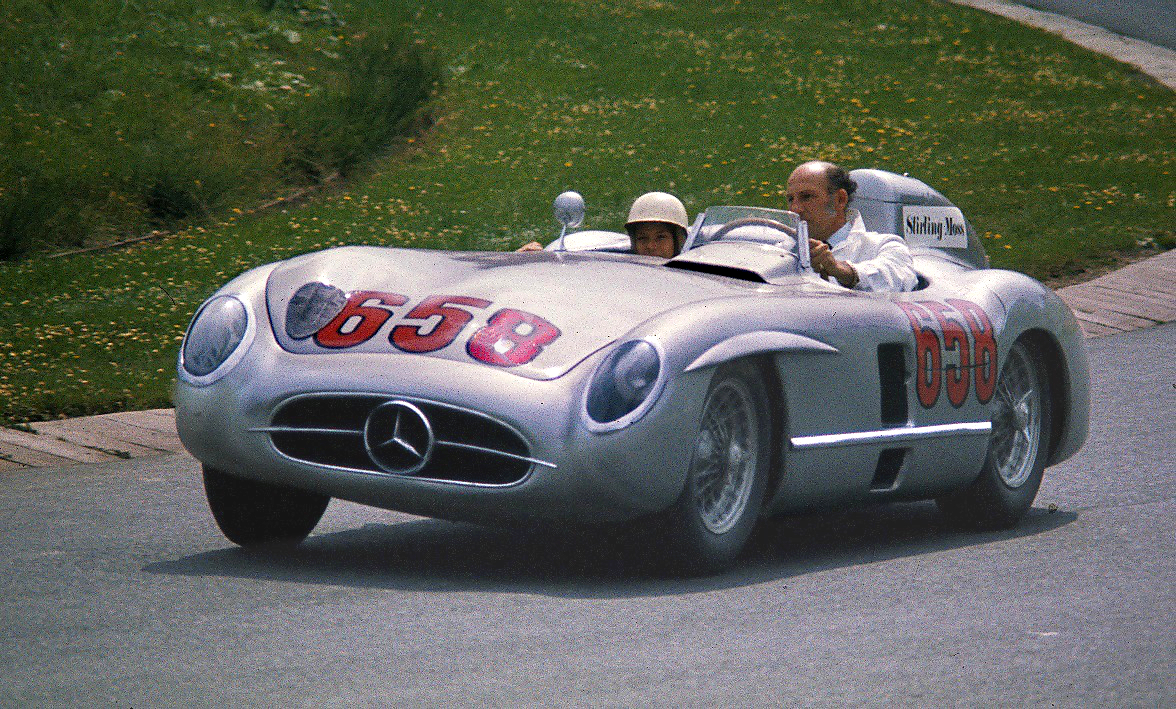
Moss demonstrating a Mercedes-Benz 300 SLR at the Nürburgring in 1977

During his driving career, Moss was one of the most recognised celebrities in Britain, leading to many media appearances. In March 1958, Moss was a guest challenger on the TV panel show What's My Line? (episode with Anita Ekberg). In April 1959 he was the subject of the television programme This Is Your Life. On 12 June the following year he was interviewed by John Freeman on Face to Face; Freeman later said that he had thought before the interview that Moss was a playboy, but in their meeting he showed "cold, precise, clinical judgement ... a man who could live so close to the edge of death and danger, and trust entirely to his own judgement. This appealed to me". Moss also appeared as himself in the 1964 film The Beauty Jungle and was one of several celebrities with cameo appearances in the 1967 version of the James Bond film Casino Royale. He played Evelyn Tremble's (Peter Sellers) driver.

For many years during and after his career, the rhetorical phrase "Who do you think you are, Stirling Moss?" was supposedly the standard question all British policemen asked speeding motorists. Moss relates he himself was once stopped for speeding and asked just that; he reports the traffic officer had some difficulty believing him. Moss was the subject of a cartoon biography in the magazine Private Eye that said he was interested in cars, women and sex, in that order. The cartoon, drawn by Willie Rushton, showed him continually crashing, having his driving licence revoked and finally "hosting television programmes on subjects he knows nothing about". It also made reference to the amnesia Moss suffered from as a result of head injuries sustained in the crash at Goodwood in 1962. Although there were complaints to the magazine about the cartoons, Moss telephoned Private Eye to ask whether he could use it as a Christmas card.

Moss was one of the few drivers of his era to create a brand from his name for licensing purposes, which was launched when his website was revamped in 2009 with improved content. In 2004, Moss was a supporter of the UK Independence Party. He was also a Mercedes-Benz Brand Ambassador, having kept a close relationship with the brand, and remained an enthusiast and collector of the brand, which includes the Mercedes-Benz W113, Mercedes-Benz SLR McLaren Stirling Moss among others.

== Personal life ==
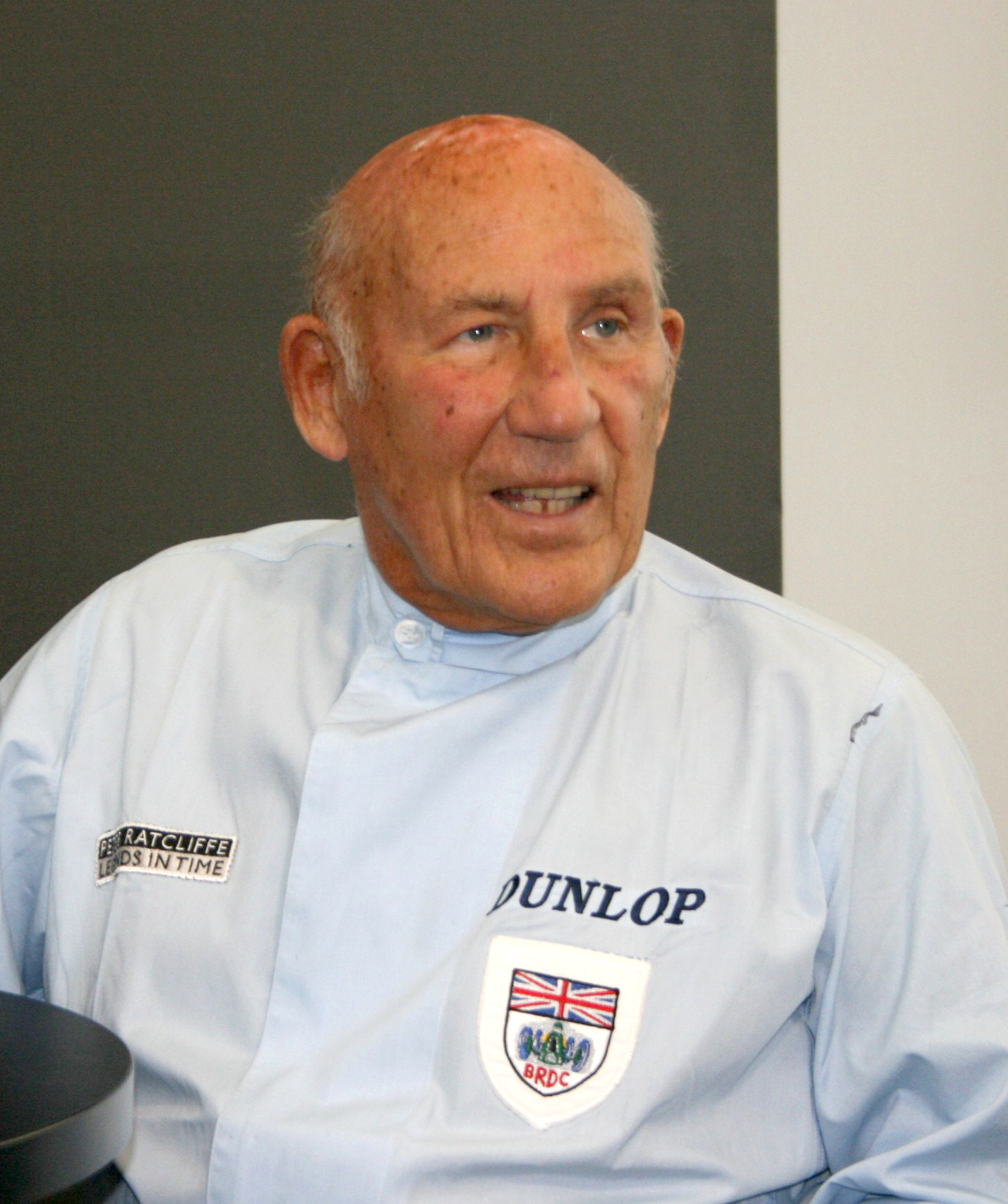
Moss in 2011

Moss was married three times. His first wife was Katie Molson, an heir to the Canadian brewer Molson. They were married on 7 October 1957 and separated three years later. His second wife was the American public-relations executive Elaine Barbarino. They were married on 25 June 1964 and divorced in 1968. Their daughter Allison was born in late 1966. His third wife was the secretary Susie Paine, the daughter of an old friend. They were married from 1980 until his death in 2020. Their son Elliot was born in 1980. Paine died in March 2023, aged 69.

In April 1960, Moss was found guilty of dangerous driving. He was fined £50 and banned from driving for one year after an incident near Chetwynd, Shropshire, when he was test-driving a Mini. Moss was an accomplished woodworker and craftsman, and participated in the design and construction of several of his own homes.

In 2013, Moss said that if a biopic were made about his life, he would want to be portrayed by "someone masculine – not a poofter or anything like that". He stood by this comment, saying that he would have to be played by a heterosexual as he had spent his life "chasing crumpet and racing cars". Moss also believed that women lack the "mental aptitude" for Formula One.

Moss's 80th birthday, on 17 September 2009, fell on the eve of the Goodwood Revival and Lord March celebrated with an 80-car parade on each of the three days. Moss drove a different car each day: a Mercedes-Benz W196 (an open-wheel variant), the Lotus 18 in which he had won the 1961 Monaco GP, and an Aston Martin DBR1. On 7 March 2010, Moss broke both ankles and four bones in a foot, and also chipped four vertebrae and suffered skin lesions, when he plunged down a lift shaft at his home. In December 2016, he was admitted to hospital in Singapore with a serious chest infection. As a result of this illness and a subsequent lengthy recovery period, Moss announced his retirement from public life in January 2018.

Moss died of cardio-respiratory failure at his home in Mayfair, London, on 12 April 2020, aged 90, after a long illness.

== Racing record ==
=== Racing career highlights ===
Season	Series	Position	Team	Car
1948	British Formula Three 500cc	1st	S. C. Moss	Cooper-JAP MkII
1948	Brough Aerodrome 500cc	1st	S. C. Moss	Cooper-JAP MkII
1948	Boscombe Carnival Speed Trial	1st	S. C. Moss	Cooper-JAP MkII
1948	Great Auclum	2nd	S. C. Moss	Cooper-JAP MkII
1949	Madgwick Cup	1st	Stirling Moss	Cooper-JAP T9
1949	R.A.C. Silverstone 50 Mile Race	2nd	Stirling Moss	Cooper-JAP T9
1949	Circuito del Garda	3rd	Alfred Moss	Cooper-JAP T9
1950	British Formula 3 500cc	1st	S. C. Moss	Cooper-JAP T11; Cooper-Norton Mk IV
1950	Prix de Monaco 500cc	1st	S. C. Moss	Cooper-JAP T11
1950	Brands Hatch Open Challenge Race	1st	S. C. Moss	Cooper-JAP T11
1950	RAC Tourist Trophy	1st	Tommy Wisdom	Jaguar XK120
1950	Daily Express 500cc	1st	S. C. Moss	Cooper-Norton Mk IV
1950	Grand Prix d'Europe 500cc	2nd	S. C. Moss	Cooper-JAP T11
1950	Grandee Trophée Entre Sambre et Meuse	2nd	HW Motors Ltd.	HWM-Alta
1950	International BARC 500cc	2nd	S. C. Moss	Cooper-Norton Mk IV
1950	Gran Premio di Bari	3rd	HW Motors Ltd.	HWM-Alta
1950	Coupe des Petites Cylindrées	3rd	HW Motors Ltd.	HWM-Alta
1950	Circuit de Périgueux	3rd	HW Motors Ltd.	HWM-Alta
1950	Hastings Trophy	3rd	HW Motors Ltd.	HWM-Alta
1951	Lavant Cup	1st	HW Motors Ltd.	HWM
1951	Goodwood International Trophy 500cc	1st	S. C. Moss	Kieft-Norton CK51
1951	British Empire Trophy	1st	Gilby Engineering	Frazer Nash Le Mans Replica
1951	RAC British Grand Prix 500 cc	1st	S. C. Moss	Kieft-Norton CK51
1951	Wakefield Cup	1st	HW Motors Ltd.	HWM
1951	RAC Tourist Trophy	1st	Jaguar Cars Ltd.	Jaguar C-Type
1951	Madgwick Cup	1st	HW Motors Ltd.	HWM
1951	Winfield Formula 2 Race	1st	HW Motors Ltd.	HWM-Alta
1951	Brands Hatch Championship	1st		Kieft-Norton CK51
1951	Grand Prix du Lac	2nd	HW Motors Ltd.	HWM-Alta
1951	Grand Prix de Marseille	3rd	HW Motors Ltd.	HWM-Alta
1951	Grote Prijs van Nederland	3rd	HW Motors Ltd.	HWM-Alta
1952	Earl of March Trophy	1st	S. C. Moss	Kieft-Norton CK51
1952	Silverstone, Race of Champions	1st	W. Lyons	Jaguar XK120
1952	Silverstone International	1st	W. Lyons	Jaguar C-Type
1952	Daily Express International Trophy for Production Touring Cars	1st	W. Lyons	Jaguar Mark VII
1952	Grand Prix de la Marne	1st	T. H. Wisdom	Jaguar C-Type
1952	Coupe des Alpes	1st	Sunbeam-Talbot	Sunbeam-Talbot 90
1952	RAC British Grand Prix 500 cc	1st	D. Annable	Kieft-Norton CK52
1952	Boreham International, 100 Mile	1st	Bill Cannell/T. H. Wisdom	Jaguar C-Type
1952	Rallye Automobile de Monte-Carlo	2nd	Sunbeam-Talbot	Sunbeam-Talbot 90
1952	Internationales ADAC Eifelrennen	2nd	HW Motors Ltd.	HWM-Alta
1952	Goodwood International	2nd	Wisdom/Cannell	Jaguar C-Type
1952	Charterhall International	2nd	T. Wisdom	Jaguar C-Type
1952	Light Car Challenge Trophy	2nd		Kieft-Norton CK51
1952	Daily Mail International 500 cc	3rd		Cooper-Norton Mk VI
1953	Daily Express International Trophy for Production Touring Cars	1st	Jaguar Cars	Jaguar Mark VII
1953	12 heures internationales de Reims	1st	P.N. Whitehead	Jaguar C-Type
1953	Coupe des Alpes	1st	Sunbeam-Talbot	Sunbeam-Talbot Alpine
1953	RAC British Grand Prix 500cc	1st	S. C. Moss	Cooper-Norton Mk VII
1953	London Trophy	1st	S. C. Moss	Cooper-Alta T24
1953	Les 24 Heures du Mans	2nd	Jaguar Cars Ltd.	Jaguar C-Type
1953	Circuito de Monsanto	2nd	Jaguar Cars	Jaguar C-Type
1953	Madgwick Cup	2nd	S. C. Moss	Cooper-Alta T24
1953	Earl of March Trophy	3rd	S. C. Moss	Cooper-Norton Mk VII
1953	Grand Prix des Sables d'Olonne	3rd	S. C. Moss	Cooper-Alta T24
1953	RAC Tourist Trophy	3rd	Jaguar Cars Ltd.	Jaguar C-Type
1954	Florida International 12-Hour Grand Prix of Endurance	1st	B.S. Cunningham	Osca MT4 1450
1954	Daily Telegraph Aintree 200	1st	S. C. Moss	Maserati 250F
1954	Coupe des Alpes	1st	Sunbeam-Talbot	Sunbeam Alpine
1954	Daily Telegraph International Challenge	1st	Francis Beart	Beart-Cooper Mk VII A
1954	International Gold Cup	1st	S. C. Moss/Officine Alfieri Maserati	Maserati 250F
1954	Goodwood Trophy	1st	Officine Alfieri Maserati/ S. C. Moss	Maserati 250F
1954	Daily Telegraph Trophy	1st	S. C. Moss	Maserati 250F
1954	Goodwood International	2nd	G. Lister & Sons	Lister-Bristol
1954	Grand Prix de Caen	2nd	S. C. Moss	Maserati 250F
1954	Daily Express International Trophy for Production Touring Cars	3rd	Jaguar	Jaguar Mark VII
1954	Grand Prix de Belgique	3rd	Equipe Moss	Maserati 250F
1954	Woodcote Cup	3rd	Officine Alfieri Maserati/ S. C. Moss	Maserati 250F
1954	FIA Formula One World Championship	13th	Equipe Moss / A. E. Moss; Officine Alfieri Maserati	Maserati 250F
1955	Mille Miglia	1st	Daimler Benz AG	Mercedes-Benz 300 SLR
1955	RAC British Grand Prix	1st	Daimler Benz AG	Mercedes-Benz W196
1955	Circuito de Monsanto	1st	Porsche	Porsche 500 Spyder
1955	RAC Tourist Trophy	1st	Daimler Benz AG	Mercedes-Benz 300 SLR
1955	International Gold Cup	1st	Stirling Moss Ltd.	Maserati 250F
1955	Targa Florio	1st	Daimler Benz AG	Mercedes-Benz 300 SLR
1955	FIA Formula One World Championship	2nd	Daimler Benz AG	Mercedes-Benz W196
1955	Gran Premio Ciudad de Buenos Aires	2nd	Daimler Benz AG	Mercedes-Benz W196
1955	Internationales ADAC-Eifel-Rennen Nürburgring	2nd	Daimler Benz A.G.	Mercedes-Benz 300 SLR
1955	Grote Prijs van Belgie	2nd	Daimler Benz AG	Mercedes-Benz W196
1955	Grote Prijs van Nederland	2nd	Daimler Benz AG	Mercedes-Benz W196
1955	Sveriges Grand Prix	2nd	Daimler Benz AG	Mercedes-Benz 300 SLR
1955	Chichester Cup	3rd	Stirling Moss Ltd.	Maserati 250F
1955	RedeX Trophy	3rd	Stirling Moss Ltd.	Maserati 250F
1956	New Zealand Grand Prix	1st	Stirling Moss Ltd.	Maserati 250F
1956	Ardmore Grand Prix	1st	Porsche Distributors (Melbourne)	Porsche 550
1956	1000 km Buenos Aires	1st	Officine Alfieri Maserati	Maserati 300S
1956	Glover Trophy	1st	Officine Alfieri Maserati	Maserati 250F
1956	British Empire Trophy	1st	Cooper Car Company	Cooper-Climax T39 Mk.II
1956	BARC Aintree 200	1st	Stirling Moss Ltd.	Maserati 250F
1956	BRDC International Trophy	1st	Vandervell Products	Vanwall VW2
1956	Grand Prix Automobile de Monaco	1st	Officine Alfieri Maserati	Maserati 250F
1956	London Trophy	1st	Stirling Moss Ltd.	Maserati 250F
1956	Internationales ADAC 1000 Kilometer Rennen auf dem Nürburgring	1st	Officine Alfieri Maserati	Maserati 300S
1956	Gran Premio d'Italia	1st	Officine Alfieri Maserati	Maserati 250F
1956	Gran Premio Internactional de Venezuela	1st	Officine Alfieri Maserati	Maserati 300S
1956	Australian Tourist Trophy	1st	Officine Alfieri Maserati	Maserati 300S
1956	Australian Grand Prix	1st	Officine Alfieri Maserati	Maserati 250F
1956	Nassau Trophy	1st	Bill Lloyd	Maserati 300S
1956	FIA Formula One World Championship	2nd	Officine Alfieri Maserati	Maserati 250F
1956	Gran Premio Ciudad de Buenos Aires	2nd	Officine Alfieri Maserati	Maserati 250F
1956	Gran Premio Supercortemaggiore	2nd	Officine Alfieri Maserati	Maserati 200S
1956	Grand Prix de Rouen	2nd	Aston Martin	Aston Martin DB3S
1956	24 Heures du Mans	2nd	David Brown	Aston Martin DB3S
1956	Großer Preis von Deutschland	2nd	Officine Alfieri Maserati	Maserati 250F
1956	Rheinland-Pfalz Preis Nürburgring	2nd	Officine Alfieri Maserati	Maserati 150S
1956	Tour de France	2nd	Stirling Moss Ltd.	Mercedes-Benz 300 SL
1956	Grote Prijs van Belgie	3rd	Officine Alfieri Maserati	Maserati 250F
1957	RAC British Grand Prix	1st	Vandervell Products	Vanwall VW5
1957	Sveriges Grand Prix	1st	Officine Alfieri Maserati	Maserati 450S
1957	Gran Premio di Pescara	1st	Vandervell Products	Vanwall VW5
1957	Gran Premio d'Italia	1st	Vandervell Products	Vanwall VW5
1957	Nassau Trophy	1st	Temple Buell	Ferrari 290 MM
1957	Nassau Memorial Trophy	1st	Temple Buell	Ferrari 290 MM
1957	FIA Formula One World Championship	2nd	Vandervell Products	Vanwall VW5
1957	1000 km Buenos Aires	2nd	Officine Alfieri Maserati	Maserati 300S
1957	12-Hour Florida International Grand Prix of Endurance for The Amoco Trophy	2nd	Officine Alfieri Maserati	Maserati 300S
1957	Gran Premio di Siracusa	3rd	Vandervell Products	Vanwall VW1
1958	Gran Premio de la Republica Argentina	1st	R.R.C. Walker Racing Team	Cooper-Climax T43
1958	Gran Premio de Cuba	1st	Luigi Chinetti/NART	Ferrari 335 S
1958	Sussex Trophy	1st	David Brown	Aston Martin DBR2
1958	British Empire Trophy	1st	David Brown (Aston Martin) Ltd.	Aston Martin DBR2
1958	BARC Aintree 200	1st	R R C Walker Racing Team	Cooper-Climax T45
1958	Grote Prijs van Nederland	1st	Vandervell Products	Vanwall VW5
1958	Internationales ADAC 1000km Rennen Nürburgring	1st	David Brown, Aston Martin Ltd.	Aston Martin DBR1/300
1958	Grand Prix de Caen	1st	R R C Walker Racing Team	Cooper-Climax T45
1958	Kanonloppet	1st	Officine Alfieri Maserati	Maserati 300S
1958	Grande Prémio de Portugal	1st	Vandervell Products	Vanwall VW5
1958	Kentish '100'	1st	R R C Walker Racing Team	Cooper-Climax T45
1958	RAC Tourist Trophy	1st	David Brown Ltd.	Aston Martin DBR1/300
1958	Grand Prix du Maroc	1st	Vandervell Products	Vanwall VW5
1958	Melbourne Grand Prix	1st	R.R.C. Walker Racing Team	Cooper-Climax T43
1958	FIA Formula One World Championship	2nd	R.R.C. Walker Racing Team; Vandervell Products	Cooper-Climax T43; Vanwall VW5
1958	Grand Prix de l'ACF	2nd	Vandervell Products	Vanwall VW5
1958	1000 km Buenos Aires	3rd	Huschke von Hanstein	Porsche 550 RS
1959	Silverstone International	1st	R.R.C. Walker Racing Team	Cooper-Borgward T43
1959	Autocar British Formula 2 Championship	1st	R.R.C. Walker Racing Team	Cooper-Borgward T43
1959	New Zealand Grand Prix	1st	R.R.C. Walker Racing Team	Cooper-Climax T51
1959	Glover Trophy	1st	R.R.C. Walker Racing Team	Cooper-Climax T51
1959	Gran Premio di Siracusa	1st	R.R.C. Walker Racing Team	Cooper-Borgward T43
1959	ADAC 1000 Kilometer Rennen	1st	David Brown	Aston Martin DBR1/300
1959	Coupe Internationale de Vitesse	1st	R.R.C. Walker Racing Team	Cooper-Borgward T45
1959	Grand Prix de Rouen-les-Essarts	1st	R.R.C. Walker Racing Team	Cooper-Borgward T45
1959	Coupe Delaniere Debrutteville	1st	Officine Alfieri Maserati	Maserati Tipo 60
1959	Trophée d'Auvergne	1st	R.R.C. Walker Racing Team	Cooper-Borgward T45
1959	Kanonloppet	1st	Keele Engineering/Stirling Moss	Cooper-Climax Monaco T49
1959	Grande Prémio de Portugal	1st	R.R.C. Walker Racing Team	Cooper-Climax T51
1959	RAC Tourist Trophy	1st	David Brown	Aston Martin DBR1/300
1959	Gran Premio d'Italia	1st	R.R.C. Walker Racing Team	Cooper-Climax T51
1959	International Gold Cup	1st	R.R.C. Walker Racing Team	Cooper-Climax T51
1959	International Formula Libre Grand Prix at Watkins Glen	1st	British Racing Partnership	Cooper-Climax T51
1959	Nassau Trophy	1st	David Brown	Aston Martin DBR2/420
1959	RAC British Grand Prix	2nd	British Racing Partnership	BRM P25
1959	FIA Formula One World Championship	3rd	R.R.C. Walker Racing Team; British Racing Partnership	Cooper-Climax T51; BRM P25
1959	Kentish '100'	3rd	R.R.C. Walker Racing Team	Cooper-Borgward T45
1960	Gran Premio Libertad Cuba	1st	Camoradi USA Racing Team	Maserati Tipo 61
1960	Fordwater Trophy	1st	Tommy Sopwith/Equipe Endeavour	Aston Martin DB4 GT
1960	B.A.R.C. Aintree '200'	1st	R.R.C. Walker Racing Team	Porsche 718/2
1960	Internationales ADAC 1000 kilometer Rennen	1st	Camoradi/USA Racing Team	Maserati Tipo 61
1960	Grand Prix de Monaco	1st	R.R.C. Walker Racing Team	Lotus-Climax 18
1960	Kanonloppet	1st	Yeoman Credit/BRP	Lotus-Climax 19
1960	RAC Tourist Trophy	1st	R. Walker & Wilkins	Ferrari 250 GT SWB
1960	RedeX Trophy	1st	R.R.C. Walker	Ferrari 250 GT SWB
1960	Flugplatzrennen	1st	R.R.C. Walker Racing Team	Porsche 718/2
1960	International Gold Cup	1st	R.R.C. Walker Racing Team	Lotus-Climax 18
1960	International Formula Libre Grand Prix at Watkins Glen	1st	Ryan Walker	Lotus-Climax 18
1960	Pacific Grand Prix	1st	R.R.C. Walker Racing Team	Lotus-Climax 19
1960	United States Grand Prix	1st	R.R.C. Walker Racing Team	Lotus-Climax 18
1960	Nassau Trophy	1st	R.R.C. Walker	Ferrari 250 GT SWB
1960	Cape Grand Prix	1st	R.R.C. Walker Racing Team	Porsche 718 RS 60
1960	South African Grand Prix	1st	R.R.C. Walker Racing Team	Porsche 718 RS 60
1960	South African Grand Prix	2nd	British Racing Partnership/Yeoman Credit	Cooper-Borgward T45
1960	4 Hours of Sebring	2nd	Donald Healey, Ltd.	Austin-Healey Sebring Sprite
1960	Grand Prix de Bruxelles	2nd	R.R.C. Walker Racing Team	Porsche 718/2
1960	Lavant Cup	2nd	R.R.C. Walker Racing Team	Porsche 718/2
1960	Glover Trophy	2nd	R.R.C. Walker Racing Team	Cooper-Climax T51
1960	FIA Formula One World Championship	3rd	R.R.C. Walker Racing Team	Cooper-Climax T51; Lotus-Climax 18
1960	Formula 2 Drivers' Championship	3rd	R.R.C. Walker Racing Team	Porsche 718/2
1960	Gran Premio de Argentina	3rd	R.R.C. Walker Racing Team	Cooper-Climax T51
1961	Warwick Farm '100'	1st	R.R.C. Walker	Lotus-Climax 18
1961	Lavant Cup	1st	RRC Walker Racing Team	Cooper-Climax T53
1961	Sussex Trophy	1st	UDT Laystall	Lotus-Climax 19 Monte Carlo
1961	Großer Preis von Wien	1st	RRC Walker Racing Team	Lotus-Climax 18
1961	BRDC International Trophy	1st	RRC Walker Racing Team	Cooper-Climax T53P
1961	Silverstone International Trophy	1st	U.D.T.- Laystall	Lotus-Climax 19 Monte Carlo
1961	Grand Prix de Monaco	1st	R.R.C. Walker Racing Team	Lotus-Climax 18
1961	Silver City Trophy	1st	U.D.T.- Laystall	Lotus-Climax 18/21
1961	The Player's 200	1st	United Dominions Corp.	Lotus-Climax 19 Monte Carlo
1961	British Empire Trophy	1st	RRC Walker Racing Team	Cooper-Climax T53
1961	Grosser Preis von Deutschland	1st	R.R.C. Walker Racing Team	Lotus-Climax 18/21
1961	Peco Trophy	1st	Rob Walker	Ferrari 250 GT SWB
1961	RAC Tourist Trophy	1st	Rob Walker	Ferrari 250 GT SWB
1961	Kanonloppet	1st	U.D.T.- Laystall	Lotus-Climax 18/21
1961	Grote Prijs van Danske	1st	U.D.T.- Laystall	Lotus-Climax 18/21
1961	Gran Premio di Modena	1st	R.R.C. Walker Racing Team	Lotus-Climax 18/21
1961	Gran Premio di Modena	1st	R.R.C. Walker Racing Team	Lotus-Climax 18/21
1961	International GoldCup	1st	R.R.C. Walker Racing Team	Ferguson-Climax P99
1961	Pacific Grand Prix	1st	U.D.T.- Laystall	Lotus-Climax 19 Monte Carlo
1961	Nassau Tourist Trophy	1st	R.R.C. Walker Racing Team	Ferrari 250 GT SWB
1961	Lady Wigram Trophy	2nd	Rob Walker Racing Team	Lotus-Climax 18
1961	Natal Grand Prix	2nd	British Racing Partnership	Lotus-Climax 18/21
1961	South African Grand Prix	2nd	British Racing Partnership	Lotus-Climax 18/21
1961	FIA Formula One World Championship	3rd	R.R.C. Walker Racing Team	Lotus-Climax 18; Lotus-Climax 18/21; Lotus-Climax 21; Ferguson-Climax P99
1961	Fordwater Trophy	3rd	Maranello Concessionaires	Ferrari 250 GT SWB
1961	Canadian Grand Prix	3rd	U.D.T.- Laystall	Lotus-Climax 19 Monte Carlo
1962	New Zealand Grand Prix	1st	Rob Walker Racing Team	Lotus-Climax 21
1962	Lady Wigram Trophy	1st	Rob Walker Racing Team	Lotus-Climax 21
1962	Warwick Farm "100"	1st	R.R.C. Walker Racing Team	Cooper-Climax T55
1962	Levin International	2nd	R.R.C. Walker Racing Team	Cooper-Climax T55
1962	Teretonga International	2nd	R.R.C. Walker Racing Team	Cooper-Climax T55
1962	3 Hours of Sebring	3rd	BMC	Austin-Healey Sebring Sprite
1980	Tricentol RAC British Saloon Car Championship	16th	Gti Engineering	Audi 80 GLE
1981	Tricentol RAC British Saloon Car Championship	19th	Team BP	Audi 80 GLE

=== Complete Formula One results ===
==== World Championship results ====
(key) (Races in bold indicate pole position; races in italics indicate fastest lap)

Year	Entrant	Chassis	Engine	1	2	3	4	5	6	7	8	9	10	11	WDC	Points
1951	HW Motors	HWM 51	Alta F2 2.0 L4	SUI; 8	500	BEL	FRA	GBR	GER	ITA	ESP				NC	0
1952	HW Motors	HWM 52	Alta F2 2.0 L4	SUI; Ret	500										NC	0
1952	English Racing Automobiles Ltd	ERA G	Bristol BS1 2.0 L6			BEL; Ret	FRA	GBR; Ret	GER	NED; Ret					NC	0
1952	Connaught Engineering	Connaught A	Lea Francis 2.0 L4								ITA; Ret				NC	0
1953	Connaught Engineering	Connaught A	Lea Francis 2.0 L4	ARG	500	NED; 9	BEL								NC	0
1953	Cooper Car Company	Cooper Special	Alta F2 2.0 L4					FRA; Ret	GBR; DNA						NC	0
1953	Cooper Car Company	Cooper T24	Alta F2 2.0 L4							GER; 6	SUI	ITA; 13			NC	0
1954	Equipe Moss	Maserati 250F	Maserati 250F1 2.5 L6	ARG	500	BEL; 3	FRA								13th	4 1/7
1954	AE Moss	Maserati 250F	Maserati 250F1 2.5 L6					GBR; Ret	GER; Ret						13th	4 1/7
1954	Officine Alfieri Maserati	Maserati 250F	Maserati 250F1 2.5 L6							SUI; Ret	ITA; 10	ESP; Ret			13th	4 1/7
1955	Daimler Benz AG	Mercedes W196	Mercedes M196 2.5 L8	ARG; 4*	MON; 9	500	BEL; 2	NED; 2	**GBR**; 1	ITA; Ret					2nd	23
1956	Officine Alfieri Maserati	Maserati 250F	Maserati 250F1 2.5 L6	ARG; Ret	MON; 1	500	BEL; 3†	FRA; 5†	**GBR**; Ret	GER; 2	ITA; 1				2nd	27 (28)
1957	Officine Alfieri Maserati	Maserati 250F	Maserati 250F1 2.5 L6	**ARG**; 8											2nd	25
1957	Vandervell Products Ltd	Vanwall VW 5	Vanwall 254 2.5 L4		MON; Ret	500	FRA	**GBR**; 1‡	GER; 5	PES; 1	ITA; 1				2nd	25
1958	R.R.C. Walker Racing Team	Cooper T43	Climax FPF 2.0 L4	ARG; 1											2nd	41
1958	Vandervell Products Ltd	Vanwall VW 5	Vanwall 254 2.5 L4		MON; Ret	NED; 1	500	BEL; Ret	FRA; 2	**GBR**; Ret	GER; Ret	**POR**; 1	**ITA**; Ret	MOR; 1	2nd	41
1959	R.R.C. Walker Racing Team	Cooper T51	Climax FPF 2.5 L4	**MON**; Ret	500	NED; Ret			GER; Ret	**POR**; 1	**ITA**; 1	**USA**; Ret			3rd	25 1/2
1959	British Racing Partnership	BRM P25	BRM P25 2.5 L4				FRA; DSQ	GBR; 2							3rd	25 1/2
1960	R.R.C. Walker Racing Team	Cooper T51	Climax FPF 2.5 L4	**ARG**; 3 (Note: After Moss retired from the race, he took over the car of Maurice Trintignant; both drivers did not receive any points for their shared drive.)											3rd	19
1960	R.R.C. Walker Racing Team	Lotus 18	Climax FPF 2.5 L4		**MON**; 1	500	**NED**; 4	BEL; DNS	FRA	GBR	POR; DSQ	ITA	**USA**; 1		3rd	19
1961	R.R.C. Walker Racing Team	Lotus 18	Climax FPF 1.5 L4	**MON**; 1	NED; 4										3rd	21
1961	R.R.C. Walker Racing Team	Lotus 18/21	Climax FPF 1.5 L4			BEL; 8	FRA; Ret	GBR; Ret	GER; 1		USA; Ret				3rd	21
1961	R.R.C. Walker Racing Team	Lotus 21	Climax FPF 1.5 L4							ITA; Ret					3rd	21
1961	R.R.C. Walker Racing Team	Ferguson P99	Climax FPF 1.5 L4					GBR; DSQ							3rd	21

* Shared drive with Hans Herrmann and Karl Kling.
^{†} Shared drive with Cesare Perdisa.
^{‡} Shared drive with Tony Brooks.

==== Non-championship results ====
(key) (Races in bold indicate pole position; races in italics indicate fastest lap)

Year	Entrant	Chassis	Engine	1	2	3	4	5	6	7	8	9	10	11	12	13	14	15	16	17	18	19	20	21	22	23	24	25	26	27	28	29	30	31	32	33	34	35
1950	HW Motors	HWM 50	Alta F2 2.0 L4	PAU	RIC	SRM	PAR; Ret	EMP	BAR; 3	JER	ALB	NED	NAT	NOT	ULS	PES	STT	INT; 6	GOO; 7	PEN																		
1951	HW Motors	HWM 51	Alta F2 2.0 L4	SYR	PAU	RIC; 5	SRM; 5	BOR	INT; 14	PAR	ULS	SCO	NED; 3	ALB	PES		GOO; 5																					
1951	Scuderia Ambrosiana	Ferrari 125	Ferrari 125 F1 1.5 V12 s													BAR; DNS																						
1952	HW Motors	HWM 52	Alta F2 2.0 L4	RIO	SYR	VAL	RIC	LAV	PAU	IBS	MAR	AST	INT	ELÄ	NAP	EIF; 2	PAR	ALB	FRO					MAR; NC	SAB	CAE												
1952	BRM Ltd	BRM P15	BRM P15 1.5 V16 s																	ULS; Ret	MNZ	LAC	ESS															
1952	English Racing Automobiles Ltd	ERA G	Bristol BS1 2.0 L6																								DMT; 7	COM	NAT	BAU	MOD	CAD	SKA	MAD; Ret	AVU	JOE; Ret	NEW; 4	RIO
1953	Cooper Car Company	Cooper Special	Alta F2 2.0 L4	SYR	PAU	LAV; 7	AST	BOR	INT; 9	ELÄ	NAP				COR; 5	SNE	EIF; 6	ALB	PRI	ESS	MID																	
1953	R.R.C. Walker Racing Team	Connaught Type A	Lea-Francis 2.0 L4									ULS; DNS	WIN	FRO																								
1953	R.R.C. Walker Racing Team	Cooper Special	Alta F2 2.0 L4																			ROU; 10	CRY	AVU	USF	LAC	BRI	CHE										
1953	Cooper Car Company	Cooper T24	Alta F2 2.0 L4																										SAB; 3					**LON**; 1	MOD	MAD; 2	JOE; Ret	CUR
1953	Stirling Moss	Cooper T24	Alta F2 2.0 L4																											NEW; Ret	CAD	RED	SKA					
1954	AE Moss	Maserati 250F	Maserati 250F1 2.5 L6	SYR	PAU	LAV	BOR; 4				ROM; NC	FRO	COR	BRC	CRY	ROU																						
1954	Officine Alfieri Maserati	Maserati 250F	Maserati 250F1 2.5 L6					INT; Ret	BAR	CUR							CAE; 2	AUG	COR	OUL; 1	RED	**PES**; Ret	JOE	CAD	BER	**GOO**; 1	**DTT**; 1											
1955	Stirling Moss	Maserati 250F	Maserati 250F1 2.5 L6	BUE	VLN	PAU	**GLV**; Ret	BOR; 4	INT; Ret	NAP	ALB	CUR	CRN	LON	DRT	**RDX**; 3	**DTT**; Ret																					
1955	Officine Alfieri Maserati	Maserati 250F	Maserati 250F1 2.5 L6															OUL; 1	AVO	SYR																		
1956	Officine Alfieri Maserati	Maserati 250F	Maserati 250F1 2.5 L6	BUE; 2																																		
1956	Stirling Moss	Maserati 250F	Maserati 250F1 2.5 L6		**GLV**; 1	SYR	AIN; 1																															
1956	Vandervell Products	Vanwall VW 2	Vanwall 254 2.5 L4					**INT**; 1	NAP	100	VNW	CAE	BRH																									
1957	Officine Alfieri Maserati	Maserati 250F	Maserati 250F1 2.5 L6	BUE; 6																																		
1957	Vandervell Products	Vanwall VW 1	Vanwall 254 2.5 L4		SYR; 3																																	
1957	Vandervell Products	Vanwall VW 3	Vanwall 254 2.5 L4			**GLV**; Ret	NAP	RMS	CAE	INT	MOD																											
1957	Vandervell Products	Vanwall VW 5	Vanwall 254 2.5 L4									MOR; DNS																										
1958	R.R.C. Walker Racing Team	Cooper T43	Climax FPF 2.0 L4	BUE; Ret	**GLV**; Ret	SYR		INT; Ret																														
1958	R.R.C. Walker Racing Team	Cooper T45	Climax FPF 2.0 L4				AIN; 1		**CAE**; 1																													
1959	R.R.C. Walker Racing Team	Cooper T51	Climax FPF 2.5 L4	GLV; 1			**OUL**; 1	SIL																														
1959	R.R.C. Walker Racing Team	Cooper T45	BRM P25 2.5 L4		AIN; Ret																																	
1959	Owen Racing Organisation	BRM P25	BRM P25 2.5 L4			**INT**; Ret																																
1960	R.R.C. Walker Racing Team	Cooper T51	Climax FPF 2.5 L4	GLV; 2	**INT**; Ret	SIL	LOM																															
1960	R.R.C. Walker Racing Team	Lotus 18	Climax FPF 2.5 L4					**OUL**; 1																														
1961	R.R.C. Walker Racing Team	Lotus 18	Climax FPF 1.5 L4	LOM	**GLV**; 4	PAU	BRX; 7	**VIE**; 1		SYR; 8	NAP	LON																										
1961	R.R.C. Walker Racing Team	Cooper T53	Climax FPF 1.5 L4						AIN; Ret																													
1961	UDT Laystall Racing Team	Lotus 18/21	Climax FPF 1.5 L4										**SIL**; 1	SOL; Ret	KAN; 1	**DAN**; 1							NAT; 2	RSA; 2														
1961	R.R.C. Walker Racing Team	Lotus 18/21	Climax FPF 1.5 L4														**MOD**; 1	FLG																				
1961	R.R.C. Walker Racing Team	Ferguson P99	Climax FPF 1.5 L4																OUL; 1	LEW	VAL	RAN																
1962	R.R.C. Walker Racing Team	Lotus 18/21	Climax FWMV 1.5 V8	CAP	BRX; Ret																																	
1962	UDT Laystall Racing Team	Lotus 18/21	Climax FPF 1.5 L4			**LOM**; 7	LAV	**GLV**; Ret	PAU	AIN	INT	NAP	MAL	CLP	RMS	SOL	KAN	MED	DAN	OUL	MEX	RAN	NAT															

=== Complete World Sportscar Championship results ===
Year	Entrant	Chassis	Engine	Class	1	2	3	4	5	6	7
1953	Jaguar Cars Ltd.	Jaguar C-type	Jaguar Straight-6	S+2.0	SEB	MLA; Ret	LMS; 2	SPA	NÜR	DUN; 3	CPA
1954	B. S. Cunningham	OSCA MT4 1500	OSCA Straight-4	S1.5	BUE	SEB; 1	MLA				
1954	Jaguar Cars Ltd.	Jaguar D-type	Jaguar Straight-6	S5.0				LMS; Ret	DUN; 14	CPA	
1955	Donald Healey Motor Co.	Austin-Healey 100	Austin-Weslake Straight-4	S3.0	BUE	SEB; 6					
1955	Daimler-Benz AG	Mercedes-Benz 300 SLR	Mercedes-Benz Straight-8	S+2.0			MLA; 1	LMS; WD	**DUN**; 1	TGA; 1	
1956	Officine Alfieri Maserati	Maserati 300S	Maserati Straight-6	S3.0	BUE; 1	SEB; Ret	MLA; Ret	NÜR; 1	**KRI**; Ret		
1957	Officine Alfieri Maserati	Maserati 300S	Maserati Straight-6	S3.0	BUE; 2	SEB; 2					
1957	Officine Alfieri Maserati	Maserati 450S	Maserati V8	S5.0			MLA; Ret	NÜR; Ret	LMS; Ret	KRI; 1	**CAR**; Ret
1958	Huschke von Hanstein	Porsche 550 RS 1.6	Porsche Straight-4	S2.0	BUE; 3						
1958	David Brown Ltd.	Aston Martin DBR1	Aston Martin Straight-6	S3.0		SEB; Ret	TGA; Ret	NÜR; 1	LMS; Ret	**GWD**; 1	
1959	The Lister Corp.	Lister Costin	Jaguar Straight-6	S3.0	SEB; DSQ	TGA					
1959	David Brown Ltd.	Aston Martin DBR1/300	Aston Martin Straight-6	S3.0			NÜR; 1	LMS; Ret	**GWD**; 1		
1960	Camoradi USA	Maserati Tipo 61	Maserati Straight-4	S3.0	BUE	SEB; Ret	TGA	**NÜR**; 1	LMS		
1961	Camoradi USA	Maserati Tipo 61	Maserati Straight-4	S3.0	SEB; Ret						
1961	Porsche KG	Porsche 718	Porsche Flat-4	S1.5		**TGA**; Ret	NÜR; 8				
1961	N.A.R.T.	Ferrari 250 GT SWB	Ferrari V12	GT+3.0				LMS; Ret	PES		
1962	Camoradi USA	Ferrari 250 TRI/61	Ferrari V12	S3.0	SEB; DSQ	TGA	NÜR				

=== Complete 24 Hours of Le Mans results ===
Year	Team	Co-Drivers	Car	Class	Laps	Pos.	Class Pos.
1951	(United Kingdom) Stirling Moss	(United Kingdom) Jack Fairman	Jaguar C-Type	S5.0	92	DNF	DNF
1952	(United Kingdom) Peter Walker	(United Kingdom) Peter Walker	Jaguar C-Type	S5.0		DNF	DNF
1953	(United Kingdom) Jaguar Cars Ltd.	(United Kingdom) Peter Walker	Jaguar C-Type	S5.0	300	**2nd**	**2nd**
1954	(United Kingdom) Jaguar Cars Ltd.	(United Kingdom) Peter Walker	Jaguar D-Type	S5.0	92	DNF	DNF
1955	(West Germany) Daimler-Benz AG	(Argentina) Juan Manuel Fangio	Mercedes-Benz 300 SLR	S3.0	134	DNF	DNF
1956	(United Kingdom) David Brown	(United Kingdom) Peter Collins	Aston Martin DB3S	S3.0	299	**2nd**	**1st**
1957	(Italy) Officine Alfieri Maserati	(United States) Harry Schell	Maserati 450S Zagato Coupe	S5.0	32	DNF	DNF
1958	(United Kingdom) David Brown Racing Dept.	(Australia) Jack Brabham	Aston Martin DBR1/300	S3.0	30	DNF	DNF
1959	(United Kingdom) David Brown Racing Dept.	(United Kingdom) Jack Fairman	Aston Martin DBR1/300	S3.0	70	DNF	DNF
1961	(United States) North American Racing Team	(United Kingdom) Graham Hill	Ferrari 250 GT SWB	GT3.0	121	DNF	DNF

=== Complete 12 Hours of Sebring results ===
Year	Team	Co-Drivers	Car	Class	Laps	Pos.	Class Pos.
1954	(United States) B.S. Cunningham	(United States) Bill Loyd	Osca MT4 1450	S1.5	168	**1st**	**1st**
1955	(United Kingdom) Donald Healey Motor Co.	(United Kingdom) Lance Macklin	Austin-Healey 100 S	S3.0	176	6th	5th
1956	(United Kingdom) David Brown & Sons, Ltd.	(United Kingdom) Peter Collins	Aston Martin DB3S	S3.0	51	DNF	DNF
1957	(Italy) Maserati Factory	(United States) Harry Schell	Maserati 300S	S3.0	195	**2nd**	**1st**
1958	(United Kingdom) David Brown	(United Kingdom) Tony Brooks	Aston Martin DBR1/300	S3.0	90	DNF	DNF
1959	(United States) B.S. Cunningham	(United States) Briggs Cunningham (United States) Lake Underwood (United States) Russ Boss	Lister-Jaguar	S3.0	164	15th	6th
1959	(United Kingdom) The Lister Corp.	(United Kingdom) Ivor Bueb	Lister-Jaguar	S3.0	98	DSQ	DSQ
1960	(United States) Camoradi USA	(United States) Dan Gurney	Maserati Tipo 61	S3.0	136	DNF	DNF
1961	(United States) Camoradi International	(United Kingdom) Graham Hill	Maserati Tipo 61	S3.0		DNF	DNF
1961	(United States) Camoradi USA	(United States) Masten Gregory (United States) Lloyd Casner	Maserati Tipo 63	S3.0		DNF	DNF
1962	(United States) North American Racing Team	(United Kingdom) Innes Ireland (United States) John Fulp (France) Fernand Tavano	Ferrari 250 TRI/61	S3.0	128	DSQ	DSQ

=== Complete 12 Hours of Reims results ===
Year	Team	Co-Drivers	Car	Class	Laps	Pos.	Class Pos.
1953	(United Kingdom) Peter Whitehead	(United Kingdom) P.N. Whitehead	Jaguar C-Type	S+2.0	243	**1st**	**1st**
1954	(United Kingdom) Jaguar Cars Ltd.	(United Kingdom) Peter Walker	Jaguar C-Type			DNF	DNF
1956	(United Kingdom) Stirling Moss	(United States) Phil Hill	Cooper-Climax T39			DNF	DNF

=== Complete Mille Miglia results ===
Year	Team	Co-Drivers	Car	Class	Pos.	Class Pos.
1951	(United Kingdom) Jaguar	(United Kingdom) Frank Rainbow	Jaguar XK120	S/GT+2.0	DNF	DNF
1952	(United Kingdom) Jaguar Cars Ltd.	(United Kingdom) Norman Dewis	Jaguar C-Type	S+2.0	DNF	DNF
1953	(United Kingdom) Jaguar Cars Ltd.	(United Kingdom) Mortimer Morris-Goodall	Jaguar C-Type	S+2.0	DNF	DNF
1955	(West Germany) Daimler Benz AG	(United Kingdom) Denis Jenkinson	Mercedes-Benz 300 SLR	S+2.0	**1st**	**1st**
1956	(Italy) Officine Alfieri Maserati	(United Kingdom) Denis Jenkinson	Maserati 350S	S+2.0	DNF	DNF
1957	(Italy) Officine Alfieri Maserati	(United Kingdom) Denis Jenkinson	Maserati 450S	S+2.0	DNF	DNF

=== Complete Rallye de Monte Carlo results ===
Year	Team	Co-Drivers	Car	Pos.
1952	(United Kingdom) Sunbeam-Talbot	(United Kingdom) Desmond Scannell (United Kingdom) John A. Cooper	Sunbeam-Talbot 90	**2nd**
1953	(United Kingdom) Sunbeam-Talbot	(United Kingdom) Desmond Scannell (United Kingdom) John A. Cooper	Sunbeam-Talbot 90	6th
1954	(United Kingdom) Sunbeam-Talbot	(United Kingdom) Desmond Scannell (United Kingdom) John A. Cooper	Sunbeam-Talbot 90	15th

=== Complete Bathurst 1000 results ===
Year	Team	Co-drivers	Car	Class	Laps	Pos.	Class pos.
1976	(Australia) Esmonds Motors	(Australia) Jack Brabham	Holden LH Torana SL/R 5000 L34	3001cc – 6000cc	37	DNF	

=== Complete British Saloon Car Championship results ===
(key) (Races in bold indicate pole position; races in italics indicate fastest lap.)

Year	Team	Car	Class	1	2	3	4	5	6	7	8	9	10	11	DC	Pts	Class
1980	GTI Engineering	Audi 80 GLE	B	MAL; Ret†	OUL; 9†	THR; 21	SIL; Ret	SIL; 13	BRH ?	MAL; 2†	BRH; 11	THR; 10	SIL; 18		16th	24	?
1981	TWR Team BP	Audi 80 GLE	B	MAL; 3†	SIL; 22	OUL; 2†	THR; Ret	BRH; Ret†	SIL; 15	SIL; 22	DON; 9†	BRH; DNS†	THR ?	SIL; 14	19th	20	6th

† Events with 2 races staged for the different classes.

== See also ==
- Formula One drivers from the United Kingdom

Sporting positions
Preceded by Inaugural	Monaco Formula Three; Race Winner; 1950	Succeeded by Michael May
Preceded by Alberto Ascari	Winner of the Mille Miglia; 1955; With: Denis Jenkinson	Succeeded by Eugenio Castellotti
Preceded by Peter Collins	BRDC International Trophy; Winner; 1956	Succeeded by Jean Behra
Preceded by Innes Ireland	BRDC International Trophy; Winner; 1961	Succeeded by Graham Hill
Awards
Preceded by David Broome	BBC Sports Personality of the Year; 1961	Succeeded by Anita Lonsbrough
Preceded by Jack Brabham	Hawthorn Memorial Trophy; 1961	Succeeded by Graham Hill
Records
Preceded by Hans Herrmann; 26 years, 131 days (1954 French GP)	Youngest driver to set fastest lap in Formula One; 24 years, 303 days (1954 British Grand Prix)	Succeeded by Bruce McLaren; 21 years, 322 days (1959 British GP)
Preceded by Harry Schell; 56 entries, 56 starts (1950 – 1960)	Most Grand Prix entries 67 entries, 66 starts (1951 – 1961), 57th at the 1960 Portuguese GP	Succeeded by Maurice Trintignant; 84 entries (82 starts), 68th at the 1961 French GP
Preceded by José Froilán González; 32 years, 19 days (1954 season)	Youngest Formula One; World Drivers' Championship runner-up 25 years, 302 days (1955 season)	Succeeded by Bruce McLaren; 23 years, 5 days (1960 season)
