= Ulf Norinder =

Swedish professional racer

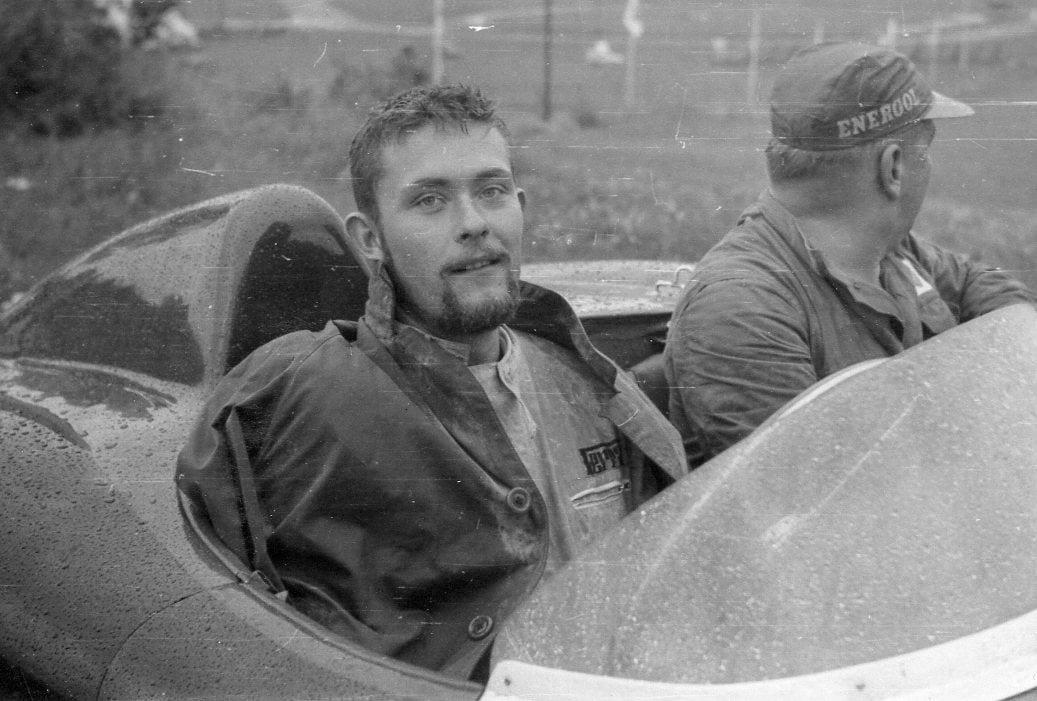
- Norinder at the 1956 Kanonloppet (Ferrari 500)
- Nationality: Swedish
- Born: Ulf Stellan Albert Johnsson-Norinder; 19 May 1934 Bollnas, Halsingland, Sweden
- Died: 14 November 1978 (aged 44) Monaco

European F5000 Championship
- Years active: 1969–1971
- Teams: Privateer, Trojan
- Starts: 23
- Wins: 0
- Poles: 0
- Best finish: 7th in 1969

Ulf Stellan Albert Johnsson-Norinder (19 May 1934 – 14 November 1978) was a racing driver from Sweden who competed in multiple classes including non-championship Formula One and the Le Mans 24 hour race in the 1960s and 1970s.

== Career ==
=== Early years ===
Norinder began his career with an entry in the 1956 Kanonloppet. Using a Ferrari 500 Mondial he failed to finish.

He finished 7th in the 1958 Eläintarhan ajot, using a Maserati 200S, 18th in the Cuban Grand Prix with a Porsche and 7th again in the Grand Prix of Naples with a Maserati. He did not finish in the Grand Prix des Frontières and although entered in the Nürburgring 1,000 km race, did not start. He shared a Porsche 356A with compatriot Jo Bonnier at the 12 Hours of Reims, finishing 12th. At the Governor's Trophy in Nassau he finished 2nd in his heat and 8th in the main race. He did not finish in the Nassau Trophy and was 7th in the Nassau Memorial race all with the Maserati.

In 1959, Norinder only competed in the Governor's Trophy series at Nassau in December. He entered four events finishing sixth in the Governors Trophy itself but 29th in the Nassau Trophy (fifth in class).

He shared a Porsche 356A with American driver John Cuevas at the 12 hours of Sebring in 1960 but did not finish. He also failed to finish in the Copenhagen Cup but was 6th in the 1960 Kanonloppet with a Porsche 718, 7th in the Nassau TT, 4th in a sports car race at Nassau and 9th in the Nassau Trophy, all using a Porsche 718.

Norinder competed in the 1961 Kanonloppet, run that year to Formula One regulations, using a Porsche 718 entered by Ecurie Maarsbergen. He qualified ninth but retired after spinning off.

In 1962, Norinder competed in the Swedish Formula Junior Championship, using a Lotus 22-Cosworth. He finished second in the championship with 17 points.

He finished 2nd in the 1963 Vastkustloppet (GT Class over 1,150 cc (70 cu in)), 6th in the sportscar class at the Kanonloppet and 6th in the Coppa Inter-Europe at Monza, all using a Ferrari 250 GTO.

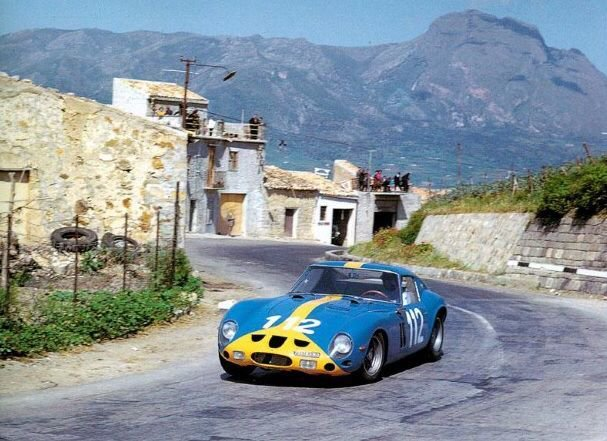
Norinder's Ferrari 250 GTO 3445GT in the 1964 Targa Florio

Norinder entered the 1964 Targa Florio in a Ferrari 250 GTO alongside Picko Per Troberg. The car finished ninth overall and second in the GT 3.0 class.

Norinder finished second in a sportscar race at Keimola in 1966 and fourth in the AvD Rheinland-Pfalz Preis, Nürburgring using a Porsche 906.

Norinder competed in the 1968 Le Mans 24 hour race alongside Sten Axelsson in a Lola T70. They retired after 5 hours (47 laps). Some sources show that the car was disqualified. Co-driven by Robin Widdows he failed to finish in the Nürburgring 1,000 km and the 1000 km of Paris. However, he achieved several podium finishes in sportscar races using a Porsche 911.

=== British Formula 5000 Championship and later career (1969–1977) ===
In 1969 Norinder competed in the Guards Formula 5000 Championship, using a Lola T142 achieving one podium finish and seventh place in the overall standings. He also competed in the 1969 Kanonloppet (sportscars) finishing seventh in a Lola T70.

In 1970, Norinder competed in the Guards Championship finishing 11th. That year he also competed in the 1970 Tasman Series with a Lola T190-Chevrolet. Three sixth-place finishes and a third at the final round at Sandown yielded seven points and ninth-place in the overall standings. The car was also entered for the 1970 Oulton Park Gold Cup but was driven by Tony Lanfranchi who qualified 13th but did not start.

He competed in the 1971 BRDC International Trophy at Silverstone using a McLaren M18-Chevrolet. The event was run to Formula One rules but was also a round of the British Formula 5000 championship and was run over two heats. Norinder finished 20th and 14th in the two races, which resulted in an aggregate position of 15th overall. He competed in four races in the series resulting in 13th place with 6 points.

1971 was Norinder's last year of major competition although he did appear in the 1977 Puss&Kram Super Star Cup in a Chevrolet Camaro Z28.

=== Career highlights ===
(key)

Year	Series/event	Entrant	Co-driver	Car	Overall position	Class position	Ref
1962	Swedish Formula Junior Championship			Lotus 22	2nd		
1963	Vastkustloppet – sportscars over 1,150 cc (70 cu in)	Ulf Norinder		Ferrari 250 GTO	2nd		
1964	Targa Florio	Ulf Norinder	Picko Per Troberg	Ferrari 250 GTO	9th	2nd (GT 3.0 class)	
1966	Keimola sportscars	Ulf Norinder		Porsche 906	2nd		
1970	Tasman Series (round 7, Sandown)	Ulf Norinder		Lola T190-Chevrolet	3rd		

=== Non-championship Formula One results ===
(key)

Season	Series/event	Entrant	Car	Position	Ref
1961	Kanonloppet	Ecurie Maarsbergen	Porsche 718	Ret	
1971	International Trophy	Trojan	McLaren M18	15†	

† Aggregate position over two heats

== Personal life and death ==
Norinder was married three times and at the time of his death was engaged to be married for a fourth time. He died in Monaco on 14 November 1978. Some sources claim that he died as a result of suicide.

He had an uncredited part as a driver in the 1968 Swedish film Het snö.
