= Vanwall straight-four engine =

Vanwall 254

Overview
- Manufacturer: (United Kingdom) Vanwall
- Production: 1954–1960

Layout
- Configuration: I4,
- Displacement: 2.2–2.5 L (134–153 cu in; 2,200–2,500 cc)
- Cylinder bore: 86–96 mm (3.4–3.8 in)
- Piston stroke: 86 mm (3.4 in)
- Cylinder block material: Aluminum
- Cylinder head material: Aluminum
- Valvetrain: 8-valve, DOHC, two-valves per cylinder

Combustion
- Fuel system: Carburetor; Fuel injection
- Oil system: Dry sump
- Cooling system: water-cooled

Output
- Power output: 210–308 hp (157–230 kW)
- Torque output: 170–215.8 lb⋅ft (230–293 N⋅m)

Dimensions
- Dry weight: ~ 163 kg (359 lb)

The Vanwall 254 is a four-stroke 2.2–2.5 L (130–150 cu in) DOHC naturally-aspirated straight-four engine, designed, developed and built by British manufacturer Vanwall, for the Vanwall Grand Prix series of cars, between 1954 and 1960.
