= 1961 Kanonloppet =

- Non-championship race in the 1961 Formula One season

Race details
- Date: 20 August 1961
- Official name: VII Kanonloppet
- Location: Karlskoga Circuit, Karlskoga
- Course: Permanent racing facility
- Course length: 2.998 km (1.863 miles)
- Distance: 30 laps, 89.95 km (55.89 miles)

Pole position
Driver	(United Kingdom) Jim Clark	Lotus-Climax
- Time: 1.30.1

Fastest lap
Drivers	(United Kingdom) Stirling Moss	Lotus-Climax
	(United Kingdom) John Surtees	Cooper-Climax
- Time: 1:30.4

Podium
First	(United Kingdom) Stirling Moss	Lotus-Climax
Second	(Sweden) Jo Bonnier	Porsche
Third	(United Kingdom) John Surtees	Cooper-Climax

The 7th Kanonloppet was a motor race, run to Formula One rules, held on 20 August 1961 at the Karlskoga Circuit, Sweden. The race was run over 30 laps of the little circuit, and was won by British driver Stirling Moss in a Lotus 18/21, run by the UDT Laystall Racing Team.

This race featured some local drivers who did not compete regularly in Formula One, and also the multiple world motorcycle champion Geoff Duke.

Stirling Moss arrived late at the circuit and missed the practice and qualifying sessions, but was allowed to start from the back of the grid.

== Results ==
Pos	Driver	Entrant	Constructor	Time/Retired	Grid
1	(United Kingdom) Stirling Moss	UDT Laystall Racing Team	Lotus-Climax	46:16.8	11
2	(Sweden) Jo Bonnier	Porsche System Engineering	Porsche	+ 12.0 s	2
3	(United Kingdom) John Surtees	Yeoman Credit Racing Team	Cooper-Climax	+ 22.7 s	4
4	(United Kingdom) Roy Salvadori	Yeoman Credit Racing Team	Cooper-Climax	29 laps	6
5	(United Kingdom) Tim Parnell	Tim Parnell	Lotus-Climax	28 laps	7
Ret	(Australia) Jack Brabham	Jack Brabham	Cooper-Climax	Gearbox	3
Ret	(United Kingdom) Jim Clark	Team Lotus	Lotus-Climax	Wishbone & Oil tank	1
Ret	(United Kingdom) Innes Ireland	Team Lotus	Lotus-Climax	Engine mountings	5
Ret	(United Kingdom) Geoff Duke	Fred Tuck	Cooper-Climax	Accident	10
Ret	(Sweden) Ulf Norinder	Ecurie Maarsbergen	Porsche	Spun off	9
Ret	(Sweden) Carl Hammarlund	UDT Laystall Racing Team	Lotus-Climax	Spun off	8
WD	(Germany) Wolfgang Seidel	Scuderia Colonia	Lotus-Climax		-
WD	(France) Maurice Trintignant	Scuderia Serenissima	Cooper-Maserati	Car not ready	-
WD	(Sweden) Yngve Roqvist	Tim Parnell	Lotus-Climax		-

Previous race: 1961 Guards Trophy	Formula One non-championship races 1961 season	Next race: 1961 Danish Grand Prix
Previous race: —	Kanonloppet	Next race: 1962 Kanonloppet
