= Vanwall Grand Prix =

Racing automobile

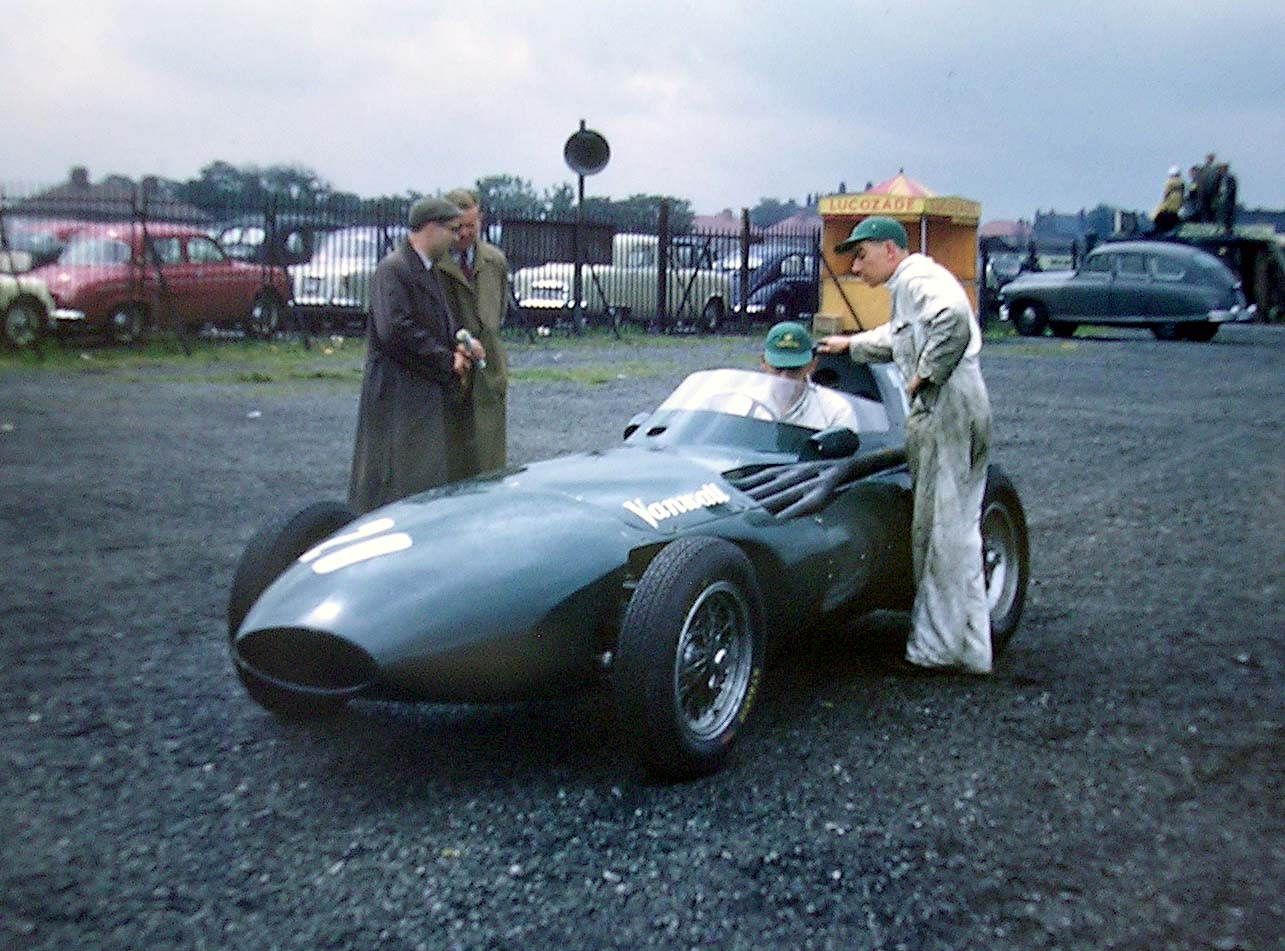
- Category: Formula One
- Constructor: Vanwall
- Designer: Frank Costin

Technical specifications
- Chassis: Multi-tubular steel spaceframe, aluminium body
- Suspension (front): Double wishbones, coil springs over shock absorbers, anti-roll bar
- Suspension (rear): De Dion axle, twin trailing arms, coil springs over telescopic shock absorbers
- Axle track: 1,416 mm (55.7 in) (front), 1,314 mm (51.7 in) (rear)
- Wheelbase: 2,268 mm (89.3 in)
- Engine: Vanwall 2.5 L (150 cu in) straight-4, naturally aspirated, longitudinally mounted, front-engine, rear-wheel-drive layout
- Transmission: 5-speed manual gearbox.
- Weight: 640 kg (1,410 lb)
- Brakes: Disc brakes all-round
- Tyres: Dunlop; Pirelli

Competition history
- Notable drivers: (United Kingdom) Stirling Moss; (United Kingdom) Mike Hawthorn; (France) Maurice Trintignant; (Argentina) José Froilán González; (United Kingdom) Tony Brooks; (United Kingdom) Stuart Lewis-Evans; (United Kingdom) Peter Collins; (Italy) Piero Taruffi; (United States) Harry Schell
- Debut: 1954 British Grand Prix
Races	Wins	Poles	F/Laps
29	9	7	6
- Constructors' Championships: 1 (1958)
- Unless otherwise stated, all data refer to Formula One World Championship Grands Prix only.

The Vanwall Grand Prix cars are a series of open-wheel Formula One race cars, designed, developed and built by British manufacturer Vanwall, for Formula One racing, between 1954 and 1960.

== Gallery ==
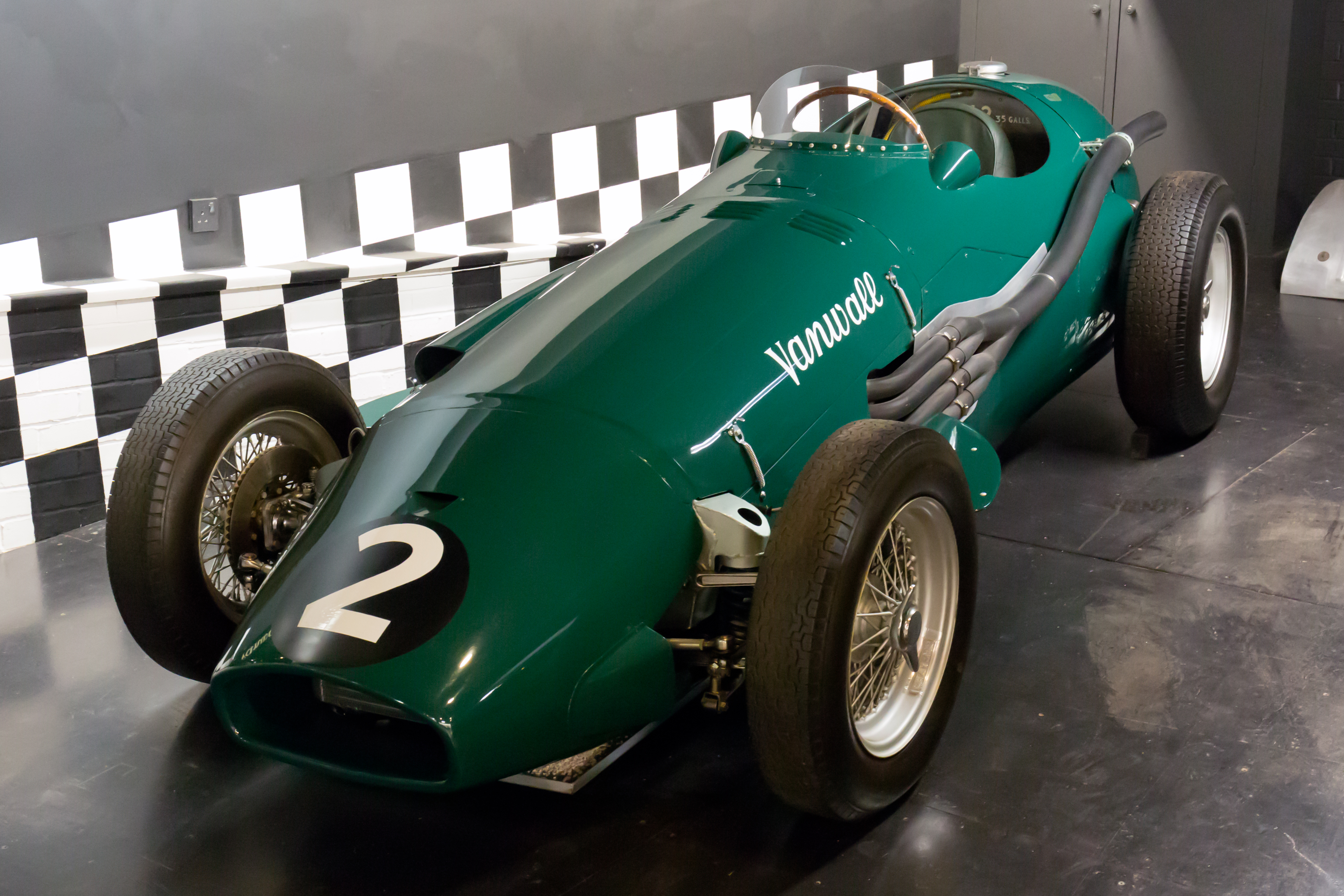
1955 Vanwall VW 2 (1955)

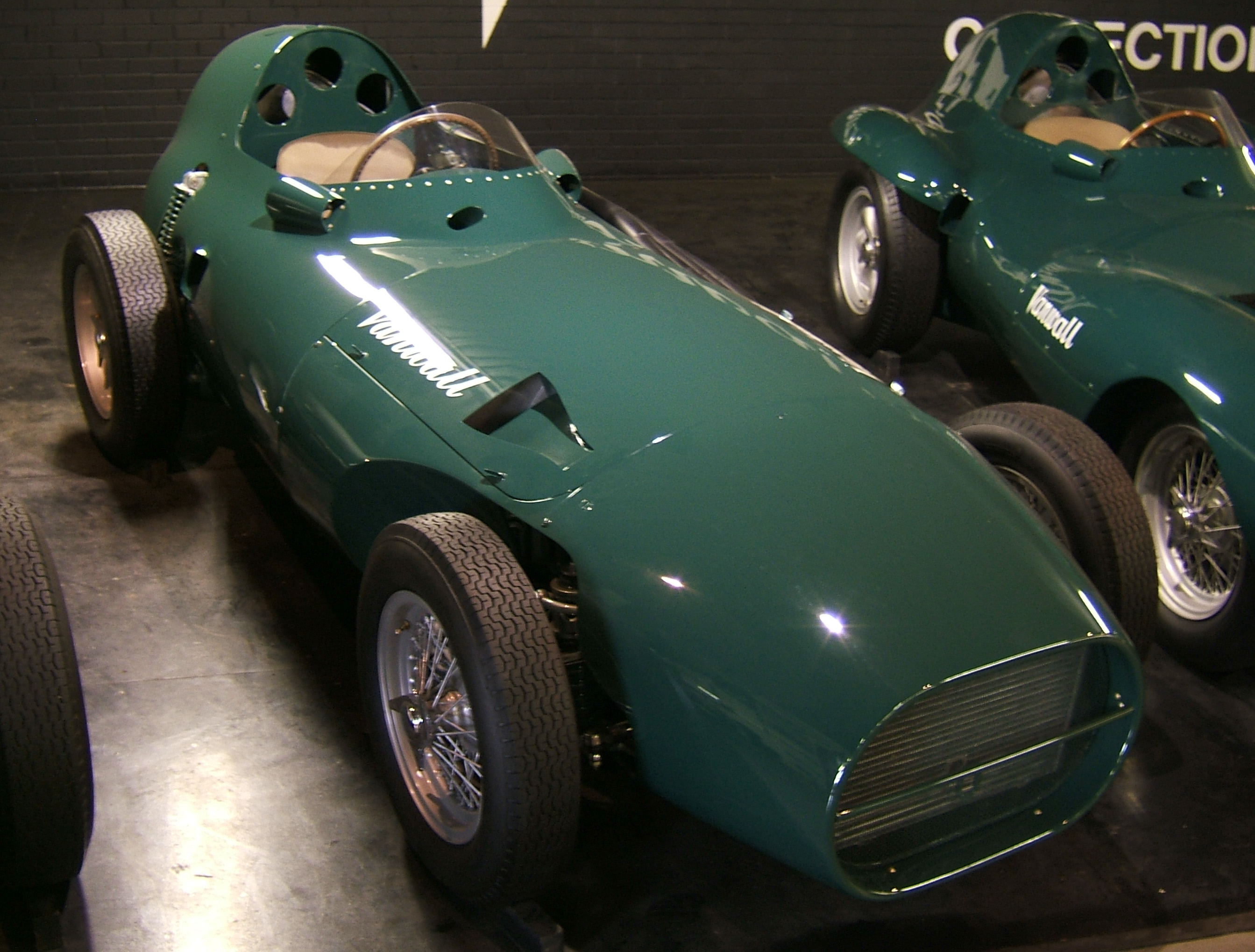
Vanwall VW 7 Monaco (1958)

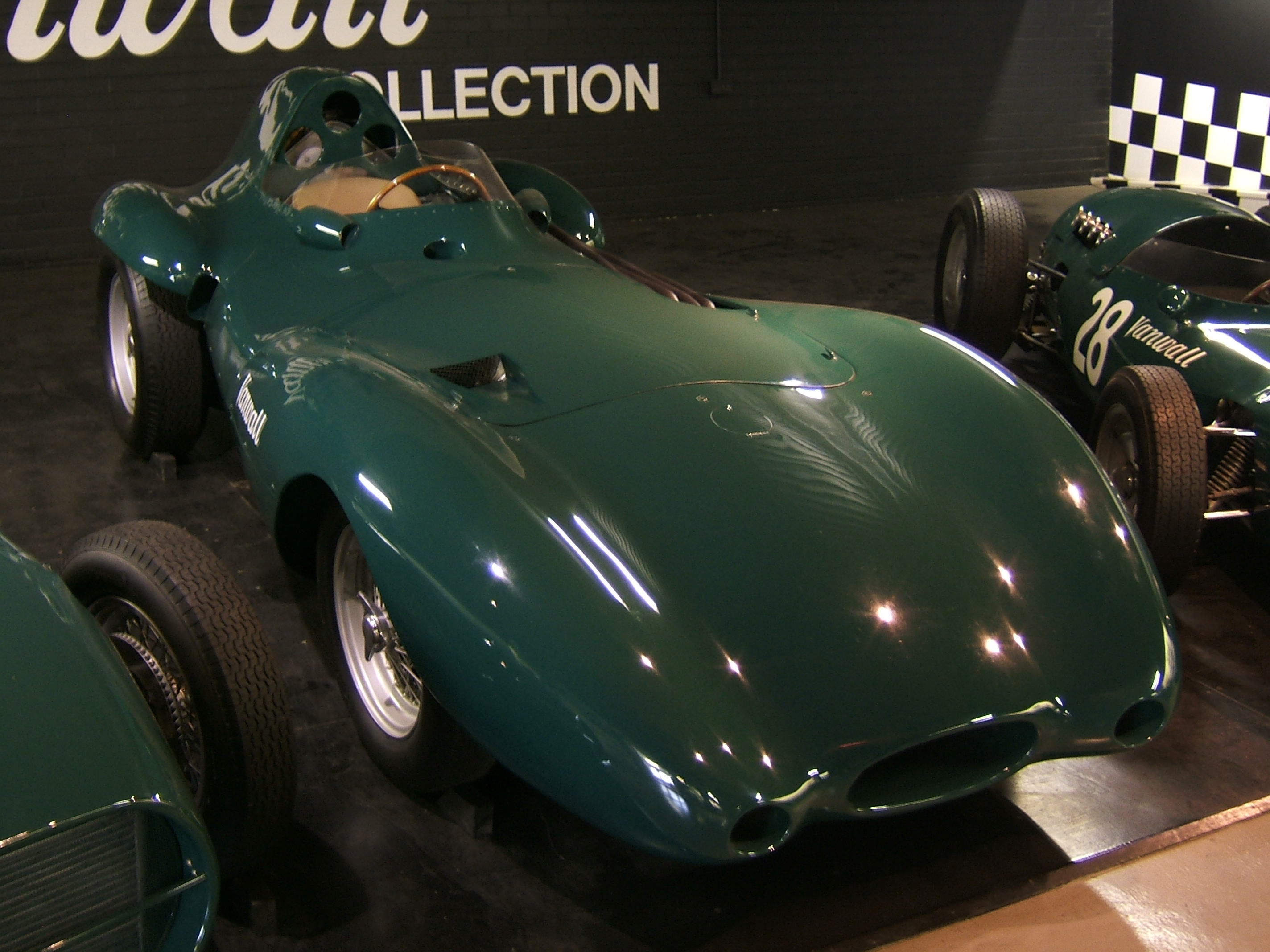
Vanwall VW 6 streamliner (1957)

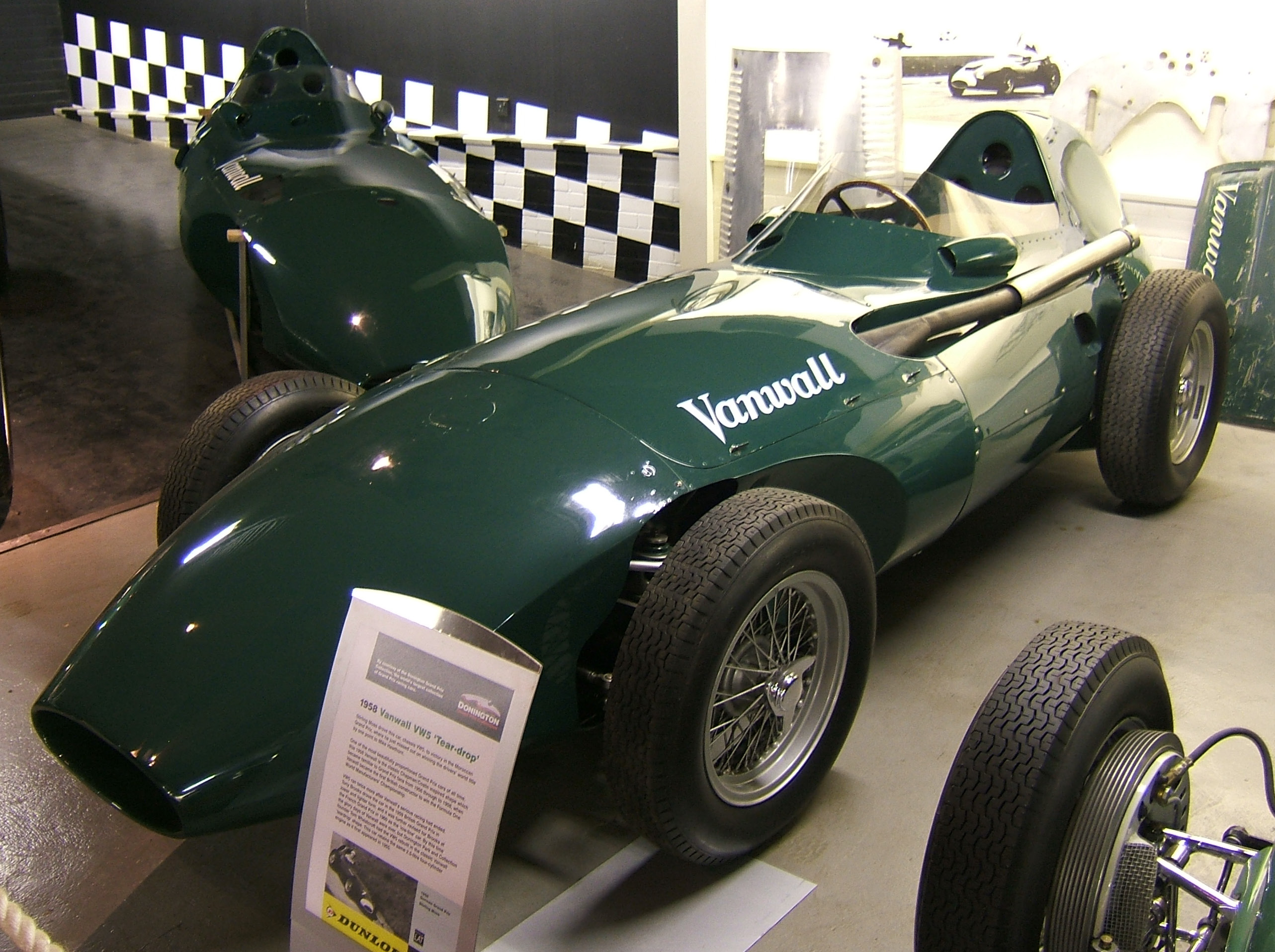
Vanwall VW 5 (1958)

== Formula One World Championship results ==
(key)

Year	Chassis	Engine	Tyres	Driver	1	2	3	4	5	6	7	8	9	10	11	Points	WCC
1954	Vanwall Special	Vanwall L4	P		ARG	500	BEL	FRA	GBR	GER	SUI	ITA	ESP			n/a	n/a (Note: The Constructors' Championship was not awarded until 1958.)
1954	Vanwall Special	Vanwall L4	P	(United Kingdom) Peter Collins					Ret			7	DNS			n/a	n/a
1955	Vanwall VW 55	Vanwall L4	P		ARG	MON	500	BEL	NED	GBR	ITA					n/a	n/a
1955	Vanwall VW 55	Vanwall L4	P	(United Kingdom) Mike Hawthorn		Ret		Ret								n/a	n/a
1955	Vanwall VW 55	Vanwall L4	P	(United Kingdom) Ken Wharton						9 (Note: Shared drive)	Ret					n/a	n/a
1955	Vanwall VW 55	Vanwall L4	P	(United States) Harry Schell						9	Ret					n/a	n/a
1956	Vanwall VW 2	Vanwall L4	P		ARG	MON	500	BEL	FRA	GBR	GER	ITA				n/a	n/a
1956	Vanwall VW 2	Vanwall L4	P	(France) Maurice Trintignant		Ret		Ret		Ret		Ret				n/a	n/a
1956	Vanwall VW 2	Vanwall L4	P	(United States) Harry Schell		Ret		4	10	Ret		Ret				n/a	n/a
1956	Vanwall VW 2	Vanwall L4	P	(United Kingdom) Mike Hawthorn					10							n/a	n/a
1956	Vanwall VW 2	Vanwall L4	P	(United Kingdom) Colin Chapman					DNS							n/a	n/a
1956	Vanwall VW 2	Vanwall L4	P	(Argentina) José Froilán González						Ret						n/a	n/a
1956	Vanwall VW 2	Vanwall L4	P	(Italy) Piero Taruffi								Ret				n/a	n/a
1957	Vanwall VW 5	Vanwall L4	P		ARG	MON	500	FRA	GBR	GER	PES	ITA				n/a	n/a
1957	Vanwall VW 5	Vanwall L4	P	(United Kingdom) Stirling Moss		Ret			1^{P}^{F}	5	1^{F}	1				n/a	n/a
1957	Vanwall VW 5	Vanwall L4	P	(United Kingdom) Tony Brooks		2			1	9	Ret	7^{F}				n/a	n/a
1957	Vanwall VW 5	Vanwall L4	P	(United Kingdom) Stuart Lewis-Evans				Ret	7	Ret	5	Ret^{P}				n/a	n/a
1957	Vanwall VW 5	Vanwall L4	P	(United Kingdom) Roy Salvadori				Ret								n/a	n/a
1958	Vanwall VW 5	Vanwall L4	D		ARG	MON	NED	500	BEL	FRA	GBR	GER	POR	ITA	MOR	48 (57)	1st
1958	Vanwall VW 5	Vanwall L4	D	(United Kingdom) Stirling Moss		Ret	1^{F}		Ret	2	Ret^{P}	Ret^{F}	1^{P}	Ret^{P}	1^{F}	48 (57)	1st
1958	Vanwall VW 5	Vanwall L4	D	(United Kingdom) Tony Brooks		Ret^{P}	Ret		1	Ret	7	1	Ret	1	Ret	48 (57)	1st
1958	Vanwall VW 5	Vanwall L4	D	(United Kingdom) Stuart Lewis-Evans		Ret	Ret^{P}		3	Ret	4		3	Ret	Ret	48 (57)	1st
1959	Vanwall VW 59	Vanwall L4	D		MON	500	NED	FRA	GBR	GER	POR	ITA	USA			0	NC
1959	Vanwall VW 59	Vanwall L4	D	(United Kingdom) Tony Brooks					Ret							0	NC
1960	Vanwall VW 11	Vanwall L4	D		ARG	MON	500	NED	BEL	FRA	GBR	POR	ITA	USA		0	NC
1960	Vanwall VW 11	Vanwall L4	D	(United Kingdom) Tony Brooks						Ret						0	NC

=== Non-championship Formula One results ===
(key)

Year	Chassis	Engine	Driver	1	2	3	4	5	6	7	8	9	10	11	12	13	14	15	16	17	18	19	20	21	22	23	24	25
1954	Vanwall Special	Vanwall L4		SYR	PAU	LAV	BOR	INT	BAR	CUR	ROM	FRO	COR	BRC	CRY	ROU	CAE	AUG	COR	OUL	RED	PES	SAC	JOE	CAD	BER	GOO	DTT
1954	Vanwall Special	Vanwall L4	(Italy) Alberto Ascari			DNA																						
1954	Vanwall Special	Vanwall L4	(United Kingdom) Alan Brown					Ret																				
1954	Vanwall Special	Vanwall L4	(United Kingdom) Peter Collins																		DNA						2	
1954	Vanwall Special	Vanwall L4	(United Kingdom) Mike Hawthorn																									2
1955	Vanwall VW 1/ VW2/ VW3	Vanwall L4		NZL	BUE	VAL	PAU	GLO	BOR	INT	NAP	ALB	CUR	COR	LON	DRT	RED	DTT	OUL	AVO	SYR							
1955	Vanwall VW 1/ VW2/ VW3	Vanwall L4	(United Kingdom) Mike Hawthorn					DNA		Ret																		
1955	Vanwall VW 1/ VW2/ VW3	Vanwall L4	(United Kingdom) Ken Wharton							Ret							2											
1955	Vanwall VW 1/ VW2/ VW3	Vanwall L4	(United States) Harry Schell												2		1		Ret	1^{P}^{F}								
1955	Vanwall VW 1/ VW2/ VW3	Vanwall L4	(United Kingdom) Desmond Titterington																3									
1956	Vanwall VW 1/ VW2	Vanwall L4		BUE	GLV	SYR	AIN	INT	NAP	100	VNW	CAE	SUS	BRH														
1956	Vanwall VW 1/ VW2	Vanwall L4	(United States) Harry Schell				DNA	Ret																				
1956	Vanwall VW 1/ VW2	Vanwall L4	(United Kingdom) Stirling Moss				DNA	1^{P}^{F}																				
1957	Vanwall VW 1/ VW3/ VW7/ VW8/ VW10	Vanwall L4		BUE	SYR	PAU	GLV	NAP	RMS	CAE	INT	MOD	MOR															
1957	Vanwall VW 1/ VW3/ VW7/ VW8/ VW10	Vanwall L4	(United Kingdom) Stirling Moss		3^{F}		Ret^{P}						DNS															
1957	Vanwall VW 1/ VW3/ VW7/ VW8/ VW10	Vanwall L4	(United Kingdom) Tony Brooks		Ret		6^{F}				DNA		Ret															
1957	Vanwall VW 1/ VW3/ VW7/ VW8/ VW10	Vanwall L4	(United Kingdom) Stuart Lewis-Evans						3				2															
1957	Vanwall VW 1/ VW3/ VW7/ VW8/ VW10	Vanwall L4	(United Kingdom) Roy Salvadori						5																			
1960	Vanwall VW 5	Vanwall L4		GLV	INT	SIL	LOM	OUL																				
1960	Vanwall VW 5	Vanwall L4	(United Kingdom) Tony Brooks	7	DNA																							
1960	Lotus 18	Vanwall L4	(United Kingdom) Tony Brooks				DNS																					
