= Kanonloppet =

- Status: Active
- Genre: Motorsports event
- Date: August
- Frequency: Annual
- Location: Karlskoga
- Country: Sweden
- Inaugurated: 4 June 1950

Kanonloppet ("the cannon race") is an annual motor race, run at the Karlskoga Motorstadion in Gelleråsen in the outskirts of Karlskoga, Sweden. The first races were run in 1950 and 1952, and then from 1954 onwards it was an annual event until the last one was held in 1984. That last year, the organizing club, Karlskoga Motorklubb, was made bankrupt.

The 7th, 8th and 9th editions, held in 1961, 1962 and 1963 respectively, were run to the Formula One rules of the time, and the following years until 1967 it was run to Formula Two rules. The 1967 race was also named the Swedish Grand Prix.

In 1996 Kanonloppet restarted as a race in the Swedish Touring Car Championship.

== Winners ==
- 1961 Kanonloppet (F1): Stirling Moss
- 1962 Kanonloppet (F1): Masten Gregory
- 1963 Kanonloppet (F1): Jim Clark
- 1964 Kanonloppet (F2): Jack Brabham
- 1965 Kanonloppet (F2): Jack Brabham
- 1966 Kanonloppet (F2): Jack Brabham
- 1967 Kanonloppet (F2): Jackie Stewart*

(*same year Jacky Ickx in SportsCars GP at Karlskoga, and after David Piper 1968, Brian Redman 1969 and Chris Craft 1970. For GT 1970, GP won by Bengt Söderström)
