= HWM 51 =

- Category: Voiturette/Formula One
- Constructor: HWM

Technical specifications
- Chassis: Steel tubular spaceframe
- Suspension (front): Double wishbones, coil springs over shock absorbers, anti-roll bar
- Suspension (rear): Leaf springs, de Dion rear axle
- Engine: 2.0 L (122.0 cu in) Alta L4 naturally-aspirated mid-engined
- Transmission: manual
- Power: 145 hp (108 kW)
- Brakes: Disc brakes
- Tires: Dunlop

Competition history

The HWM 51 was an open-wheel race car, designed by Briton John Heath, and developed and built by HWM (Hersham and Walton Motors), in 1951. It competed in voiturette racing events, as well as two Formula One World Championship Grand Prix events; the 1951 Swiss Grand Prix, and the 1952 Belgian Grand Prix.
