= 1962 Kanonloppet =

- Non-championship race in the 1962 Formula One season

Race details
- Date: 12 August 1962
- Official name: VIII Kanonloppet
- Location: Karlskoga Motorstadion, Karlskoga
- Course: Permanent racing facility
- Course length: 2.998 km (1.863 miles)
- Distance: 30 laps, 89.95 km (55.89 miles)

Pole position
Driver	(United Kingdom) John Surtees	Lola-Climax
- Time: 1.25.4

Fastest lap
Driver	(United Kingdom) Innes Ireland	Lotus-Climax
- Time: 1:24.1

Podium
First	(United States) Masten Gregory	Lotus-BRM
Second	(United Kingdom) Roy Salvadori	Lola-Climax
Third	(Sweden) Jo Bonnier	Porsche

The 8th Kanonloppet was a motor race, run to Formula One rules, held on 12 August 1962 at the Karlskoga circuit, Sweden. The race was run over 30 laps of the little circuit, and was won by American driver Masten Gregory in a Lotus 24, run by the UDT Laystall Racing Team.

== Race ==
In training, Graham Hill left the track and damaged the nose on the Rob Walker Lotus 24. He went on to compete without a nosecone. Rookie Olle Nygren could not find fourth gear in the Lotus 18 he had borrowed from Jay Chamberlain, and was also having a hard time finding his brake points. Nygren qualified last and only lasted six laps of this, his only Formula One race. Kurt Kuhnke's interesting Borgward-engined Lotus only made a few practice laps before it spun a main bearing and was withdrawn. A recent resurfacing of the track led to lap times dropping by about 5 seconds compared to 1961, meaning some last-minute modifications to the cars had to be carried out to account for the higher speeds.

Surtees took the lead from pole, but already on the second lap Masten Gregory passed him in Tröskurvan (curve one). Surtees tried to take back the lead, but missed a gearshift after being blinded by water splashed by Gregory's car. Gregory took a lead of about five car lengths and was never threatened again. Innes Ireland had gone off the track on the opening lap but clawed his way back up the field for a fourth place in the end, putting down a new lap record along the way. On the 11th lap Surtees retired with a broken valve spring, Hill with an oil leak, and ninth-placed Collomb with engine failure. Bonnier seemed to be in a secure second place, but Salvadori in the Lola gave chase and managed to pass. Bonnier made a spirited attempt to regain second in the last turn of the race, but came up three metres short at the flag. Burgess and Count de Beaufort finished a lap down, both in four-cylinder cars while the first four all raced eight-cylinder ones. Burgess' Cooper was a unique mix of Formula Junior and Formula One parts, all in the interest of minimizing frontal area. De Beaufort's car, while entered by his private team Ecurie Maarsbergen, was supported by the factory and he shared three mechanics with Bonnier.

== Results ==
Pos	Driver	Entrant	Constructor	Time/Retired	Grid
1	(United States) Masten Gregory	UDT Laystall Racing Team	Lotus-BRM	42:51.3	6
2	(United Kingdom) Roy Salvadori	Bowmaker Racing Team	Lola-Climax	+ 7.3 s	4
3	(Sweden) Jo Bonnier	Porsche System Engineering	Porsche 804	+ 7.5 s	3
4	(United Kingdom) Innes Ireland	UDT Laystall Racing Team	Lotus-Climax	+ 36.7 s	2
5	(United Kingdom) Ian Burgess	Anglo-American Equipe	Cooper Special-Climax	29 laps	7
6	(Netherlands) Carel Godin de Beaufort	Ecurie Maarsbergen	Porsche 718	29 laps	8
Ret	(France) Bernard Collomb	Bernard Collomb	Cooper-Climax	11, Engine	9
Ret	(United Kingdom) John Surtees	Bowmaker Racing Team	Lola-Climax	11, Valve spring	1
Ret	(United Kingdom) Graham Hill	Rob Walker Racing Team	Lotus-Climax	11, Oil leak	5
Ret	(Sweden) Olle Nygren	Ecurie Excelsior	Lotus-Climax	6, Gearbox	10
WD	(United Kingdom) John Campbell-Jones	Emeryson Cars	Emeryson-Climax	Driver injured	-
WD	(United States) Tony Settember	Emeryson Cars	Emeryson-Climax		-
WD	(Germany) Kurt Kuhnke	Kurt Kuhnke	Lotus-Borgward	Engine not ready	-
WD	(United Kingdom) David Piper	David Piper	Lotus-Climax		-

Previous race: 1962 Solitude Grand Prix	Formula One non-championship races 1962 season	Next race: 1962 Mediterranean Grand Prix
Previous race: 1961 Kanonloppet	Kanonloppet	Next race: 1963 Kanonloppet
