= 1955 Lavant Cup =

1954 Lavant Cup

Race details
- Date: 11 April 1954
- Official name: VII Lavant Cup
- Location: Goodwood Circuit, West Sussex
- Course: Permanent racing facility
- Course length: 3.809 km (2.367 miles)
- Distance: 7 laps, 26.577 km (16.569 miles)

Pole position
Driver	(United Kingdom) Roy Salvadori	Connaught
- Grid positions set by ballot

Fastest lap
Driver	(United Kingdom) Roy Salvadori	Connaught
- Time: 1:38.0

Podium
First	(United Kingdom) Roy Salvadori	Connaught
Second	(United Kingdom) Bob Gerard	Cooper
Third	(United Kingdom) Don Beauman	Connaught

The 7th Lavant Cup was a motor race, run to Formula Two rules, held on 11 April 1955 at Goodwood Circuit, West Sussex. The race was run over 7 laps, and was won by British driver Roy Salvadori in a Connaught Type A-Lea Francis, setting fastest lap in the process. Bob Gerrard in a Cooper T23-Bristol was second, just 0.8 seconds behind Salvadori, and Don Beauman was third in another Connaught Type A-Lea Francis.

== Results ==
Pos.	No.	Driver	Entrant	Car	Time/Retired	Grid
1	9	Roy Salvadori	John Young	Connaught Type A-Lea Francis	11:38.6, 86.57mph	1
2	16	Bob Gerard	F.R. Gerard	Cooper T23-Bristol	+0.8s	4
3	5	Don Beauman	Sir Jeremy Boles	Connaught Type A-Lea Francis		2
4	12	Mike Keen	R.J. Chase	Cooper T24-Alta		5
5	8	Bill Holt	E.W. Holt	Connaught Type A-Lea Francis		3
6	24	Mike Anthony	M. Anthony	Lotus Mark X-Bristol		7
	17	Dick Gibson	T.A.D. Crook	Cooper T23-Bristol		11
	18	Tom Kyffin	Equipe Devone	Cooper T23-Bristol		12
	20	Paul Emery	Emeryson Cars	Emeryson-Alta		8
	23	Horace Richards	H.A. Richards	H.A.R.-Riley		9
Ret	21	Ron Flockhart	J.H. Webb	Turner-Alta	6 laps	13
Ret	6	John Riseley-Prichard	Equipe Endeavour	Connaught Type A-Lea Francis	5 laps - gearbox	10
DNS	19	Bruce Halford	Equipe Devone	Cooper T23-Bristol		6
DNA	4	Alan Brown	A. Brown	Connaught Type A-Lea Francis		-
DNA	11	Michael Young	Roebuck Engineering	Connaught Type A-Lea Francis		-
DNA	15	Edward Greenall	Hon E.G. Greenall	Cooper T24-Alta		-
