= 1954 Crystal Palace Trophy =

- Non-championship race in the 1954 Formula One season
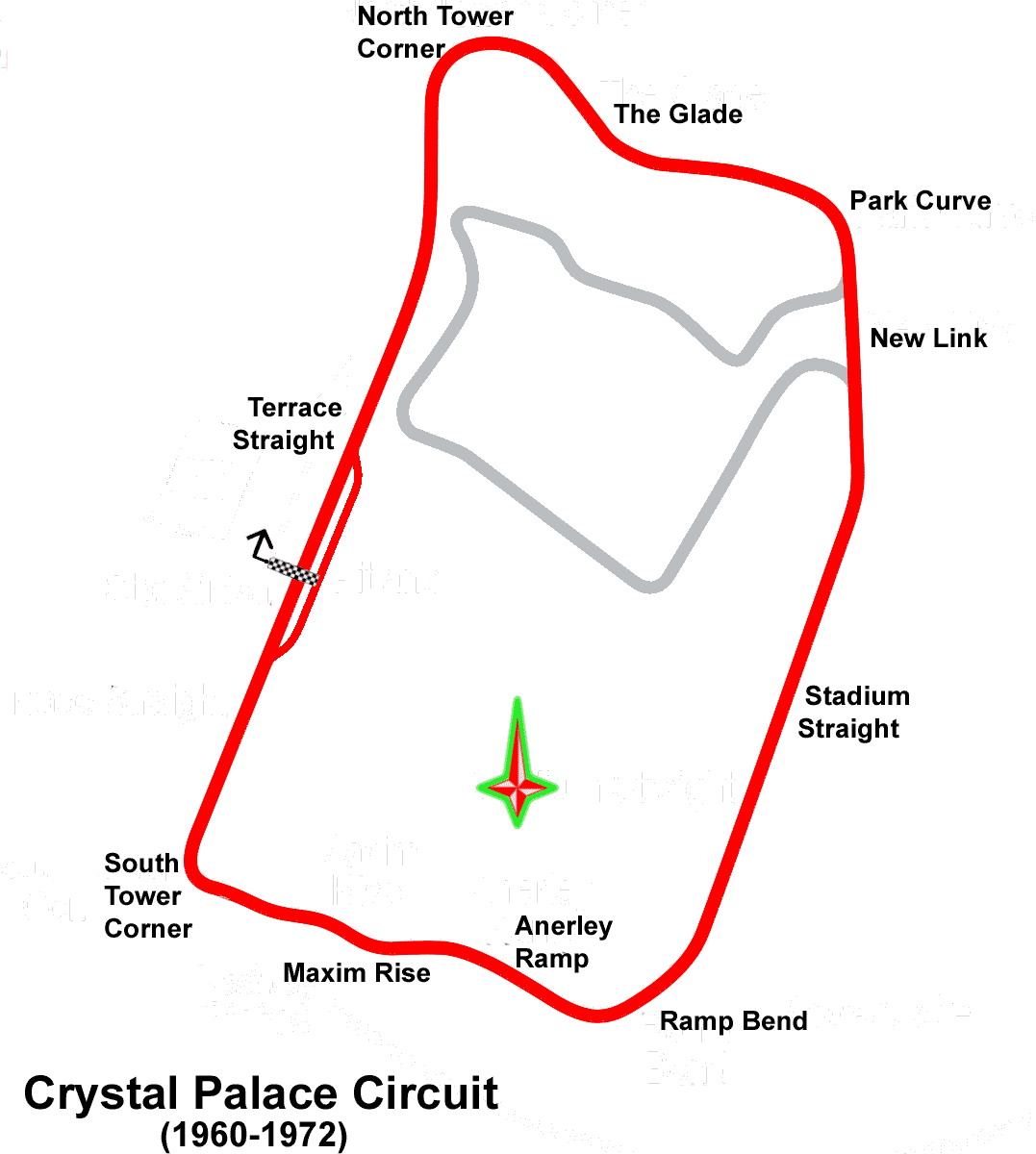

Race details
- Date: 19 June 1954
- Official name: II Crystal Palace Trophy
- Location: Crystal Palace Circuit, London
- Course: Permanent racing facility
- Course length: 2.240 km (1.390 miles)
- Distance: 10 (final) laps, 21.64 km (13.49 miles)

Pole position
Driver	(United Kingdom) Reg Parnell (Final)	Ferrari
- Grid positions set by heat results

Fastest lap
Driver	(United Kingdom) Reg Parnell	Ferrari
- Time: 1:07

Podium
First	(United Kingdom) Reg Parnell	Ferrari
Second	(United Kingdom) Peter Collins	Connaught-Lea Francis
Third	(United Kingdom) Rodney Nuckey	Cooper-Bristol

The 2nd Crystal Palace Trophy was a motor race, run to Formula One rules, held on 19 June 1954 at Crystal Palace Circuit, London. The race was run over two heats of 10 laps and a final of 10 laps.

Reg Parnell in a Ferrari 500 won Heat 1 and set fastest lap in that heat. Peter Collins in a Connaught Type A-Lea Francis started from pole position in Heat 1.

Rodney Nuckey in a Cooper T23-Bristol won Heat 2 and set fastest lap in that heat. Don Beauman in a Connaught Type A-Lea Francis started from pole position in Heat 2.

Parnell won the final, starting from pole by way of being fastest winner in the heats, and set fastest lap. Collins was second and Nuckey third.

== Entries ==
No.	Driver	Entrant	Car
1	(United Kingdom) Don Beauman	Sir Jeremy Boles	Connaught Type A-Lea Francis
2	(United Kingdom) Reg Parnell	Scuderia Ambrosiana	Ferrari 500
3	(United Kingdom) Charles Boulton	Charles Boulton	Connaught Type A-Lea Francis
4	(United Kingdom) Peter Collins	R.R.C. Walker Racing Team	Connaught Type A-Lea Francis
5	(United Kingdom) Bill Whitehouse	Bill Whitehouse	Connaught Type A-Lea Francis
6	(United Kingdom) Michael Young	Roebuck Engineering	Connaught Type A-Lea Francis
7	(United Kingdom) Rodney Nuckey	Ecurie Richmond	Cooper T23-Bristol
8^{1}	(United Kingdom) Mike Keen	R.J. Chase	Cooper T23-Bristol
9	(United Kingdom) Jimmy Somervail	Border Reivers	Cooper T20-Bristol
10^{1}	(United Kingdom) Roy Salvadori	Gilby Engineering	Maserati 250F
11	(United Kingdom) Paul Emery	Emeryson Cars	Emeryson Mk.1-Alta
12^{1}	(United Kingdom) Keith Hall	Keith Hall	Cooper T20-Bristol
14	(United Kingdom) Ted Whiteaway	E.N. Whiteaway	HWM-Alta
15	(United Kingdom) Jack Fairman	J.H. Webb	Turner-Lea Francis
15^{2}	(United Kingdom) John Webb	J.H. Webb	Turner-Lea Francis
16^{1}	(United Kingdom) Oliver Simpson	Ron Searles	Cooper-JAP
17	(United Kingdom) Gerry Dunham	Gerry Dunham	Alvis Special
18	(United Kingdom) Les Leston	Les Leston	Cooper-JAP
19	(United Kingdom) Don Bennett	Don Bennett	Cooper-Vincent
20	(United Kingdom) Horace Gould	Gould's Garage (Bristol)	Cooper T23-Bristol
21^{1}	(United Kingdom) Tom Kyffin	Tom Kyffin	Cooper T20-Bristol
21^{1}	(United Kingdom) David Watts	Tom Kyffin	Cooper T20-Bristol

^{1}DNA
^{2}Fairman raced Webb's car

== Results ==
=== Heats ===
Heat 1

Pos	Driver	Car	Time/Ret.
1	(United Kingdom) Reg Parnell	Ferrari	11:26.6, 72.94mph
2	(United Kingdom) Peter Collins	Connaught-Lea Francis	+9.0s
3	(United Kingdom) Les Leston	Cooper-JAP	+11.8s
4	(United Kingdom) Horace Gould	Cooper-Bristol	10 laps
5	(United Kingdom) Ted Whiteaway	HWM-Alta	10 laps
6	(United Kingdom) Michael Young	Connaught-Lea Francis	10 laps

Heat 2

Pos	Driver	Car	Time/Ret.
1	(United States) Rodney Nuckey	Cooper-Bristol	11:36.4, 71.67mph
2	(United Kingdom) Don Beauman	Connaught-Lea Francis	+4.2s
3	(United Kingdom) Bill Whitehouse	Connaught-Lea Francis	+12.6s
4	(United Kingdom) Jack Fairman	Turner-Lea Francis	10 laps
5	(United Kingdom) Paul Emery	Emeryson-Alta	10 laps
6	(United Kingdom) Charles Boulton	Connaught-Lea Francis	10 laps
7	(United Kingdom) Gerry Dunham	Alvis	10 laps
Ret	(United Kingdom) Jimmy Somervail	Cooper-Bristol	4 laps, crash
Ret	(United Kingdom) Don Bennett	Cooper-Vincent	0 laps, mechanical

=== Final ===
Grid positions for the final were determined by the drivers' finishing times in the heats. Only the top six drivers from each heat qualified for the final.

Pos.	Driver	Car	Time/Retired	Grid
1	(United Kingdom) Reg Parnell	Ferrari	11:26.6, 72.94mph	1
2	(United Kingdom) Peter Collins	Connaught-Lea Francis	+5.2s	2
3	(United Kingdom) Don Beauman	Connaught-Lea Francis	+17.0s	5
4	(United Kingdom) Bill Whitehouse	Connaught-Lea Francis	10 laps	6
5	(United Kingdom) Rodney Nuckey	Cooper-Bristol	10 laps	3
6	(United Kingdom) Horace Gould	Cooper-Bristol	10 laps	7
7	(United Kingdom) Michael Young	Connaught-Lea Francis	10 laps	10
8	(United Kingdom) Paul Emery	Emeryson-Alta	10 laps	11
9	(United Kingdom) Charles Boulton	Connaught-Lea Francis	9 laps	12
Ret	(United Kingdom) Ted Whiteaway	HWM-Alta	6 laps	9
Ret	(United Kingdom) Jack Fairman	Turner-Lea Francis	3 laps, gearbox	8
Ret	(United Kingdom) Les Leston	Cooper-JAP	0 laps	4

Previous race: 1954 BARC Formula 1 Race	Formula One non-championship races 1954 season	Next race: 1954 Rouen Grand Prix
Previous race: 1953 Crystal Palace Trophy	Crystal Palace Trophy	Next race: 1962 Crystal Palace Trophy
