= 1954 Joe Fry Memorial Trophy =

- Non-championship race in the 1954 Formula One season

Race details
- Date: 28 August 1954
- Official name: III Joe Fry Memorial Trophy
- Location: Castle Combe Circuit, Wilts.
- Course: Permanent racing facility
- Course length: 2.96 km (1.84 miles)
- Distance: 15 laps, 44.40 km (27.60 miles)

Pole position
Driver	not known	
- Grid positions set by ballot

Fastest lap
Driver	(United Kingdom) Bob Gerard	Cooper-Bristol
- Time: 1:!6.2

Podium
First	(United Kingdom) Horace Gould	Maserati
Second	(United Kingdom) Bill Whitehouse	Connaught-Lea Francis
Third	(United Kingdom) John Riseley-Prichard	Connaught-Lea Francis

The 3rd Joe Fry Memorial Trophy was a non-championship Grand Prix held at the Castle Combe Circuit, Wiltshire on 28 August 1954. The race was won by Horace Gould in a Cooper T23, with Bill Whitehouse and John Riseley-Prichard second and third in their Connaughts. Bob Gerard set fastest lap in his Cooper.

== Results ==
Pos	No.	Driver	Entrant	Car	Time/Retired
1	36	(United Kingdom) Horace Gould	Gould's Garage (Bristol)	Cooper T23-Bristol	19:49.0, 83.56 mph
2	42	(United Kingdom) Bill Whitehouse	W.G. Whitehouse	Connaught A-Type-Lea-Francis	+11.1s
3	45	(United Kingdom) John Riseley-Prichard	John Riseley-Prichard	Connaught A-Type-Lea-Francis	+17.2s
4	40	(United Kingdom) Michael Young	Roebuck Engineering	Connaught A-Type-Lea-Francis	15 laps
	38	(United Kingdom) Paul Emery	Emeryson Cars	Emeryson Mk.1-Alta	
	39	(United Kingdom) Anthony Brooke	A. Brooke	HWM-Alta	
	41	(United Kingdom) Ted Whiteaway	E.N. Whiteaway	HWM-Alta	
	46	(United Kingdom) Oliver Simpson	Oliver Simpson	Rover Special	
	50	(United Kingdom) Dick Gibson	R. Gibson	Cooper T23-Bristol	
NC	47	(United Kingdom) Ron Searles	R. Searles	Cooper-JAP	
Ret	49	(United Kingdom) Bob Gerard	F.R. Gerard	Cooper T23-Bristol	7 laps, suspension
Ret	43	(United Kingdom) Jack Fairman	J.H. Webb	Turner-Lea Francis	3 laps, piston failure
Ret	44	(United Kingdom) Reg Parnell	Scuderia Ambrosiana	Ferrari 625	1 lap, piston failure
DNA	48	(United Kingdom) Roy Salvadori	Gilby Engineering	Maserati 250F	car impounded by customs
DNA	51	(United Kingdom) Les Leston	L. Leston	Cooper-JAP	

Previous race: 1954 Circuit of Pescara	Formula One non-championship races 1954 season	Next race: 1954 Circuit de Cadours
Previous race: 1953 Joe Fry Memorial Trophy	Joe Fry Memorial Trophy	Next race: —
