= 1954 Curtis Trophy =

- Non-championship race in the 1954 Formula One season

Race details
- Date: 5 June 1954
- Official name: II Curtis Trophy
- Location: Snetterton Circuit, Norfolk
- Course: Permanent racing facility
- Course length: 4.361 km (2.719 miles)
- Distance: 10 laps, 43.61 km (27.19 miles)

Fastest lap
| Driver | (United Kingdom) Roy Salvadori | Maserati |
- Time: 1:49.2

Podium
| First | (United Kingdom) Roy Salvadori | Maserati |
| Second | (United Kingdom) Bill Whitehouse | Connaught-Lea Francis |
| Third | (United Kingdom) Jimmy Somervail | Cooper-Bristol |

The 2nd Curtis Trophy was a motor race, run to Formula One rules, held on 5 June 1954 at Snetterton Circuit, Norfolk. The race was run over 10 laps of the circuit, and was won by British driver Roy Salvadori in a Maserati 250F, who also set fastest lap. Bill Whitehouse in a Connaught Type A-Lea Francis and Jimmy Somervail in a Cooper T20-Bristol were second and third.

== Results ==
| Pos | No. | Driver | Entrant | Constructor | Time/Retired |
|---|---|---|---|---|---|
| 1 | 10 | (United Kingdom) Roy Salvadori | Gilby Engineering | Maserati 250F | 18:26.4, 87.85 mph |
| 2 | 5 | (United Kingdom) Bill Whitehouse | W.J. Whitehouse | Connaught Type A-Lea Francis | +55.4s |
| 3 | 4 | (United Kingdom) Jimmy Somervail | Border Reivers | Cooper T20-Bristol | +1:01.0 |
| 4 | 6 | (United Kingdom) Tony Crook | T.A.D. Crook | Cooper T23-Bristol | +1:22.0 |
| 5 | 54 | (United Kingdom) Charles Boulton | C.D. Boulton | Connaught Type A-Lea Francis | |
| 6 | 1 | (United Kingdom) Les Leston | Les Leston | Cooper-JAP | |
| 7 | 3 | (United Kingdom) Michael Young | Michael Young | Connaught Type A-Lea Francis | |
| 8 | 8 | (United Kingdom) Ted Whiteaway | E.N. Whiteaway | HWM-Alta | |
| DNA | 2 | (United Kingdom) Jock Lawrence | Ecurie Ecosse | Connaught Type A-Lea Francis | |
| DNA | 15 | (United Kingdom) Horace Gould | Gould's Garage (Bristol) | Cooper T23-Bristol | |

| Previous race: 1954 Bari Grand Prix | Formula One non-championship races 1954 season | Next race: 1954 Rome Grand Prix |
| Previous race: 1953 Curtis Trophy | Curtis Trophy | Next race: 1955 Curtis Trophy |
