= Leslie Thorne =

British racing driver (1916–1993)

- Born: 23 June 1916; Greenock, Inverclyde, Scotland
- Died: 13 July 1993 (aged 77); Troon, South Ayrshire, Scotland

Formula One World Championship career
- Nationality: (United Kingdom) British
- Active years: 1954
- Team: non-works Connaught
- Entries: 1
- Championships: 0
- Wins: 0
- Podiums: 0
- Career points: 0
- Pole positions: 0
- Fastest laps: 0
- First entry: 1954 British Grand Prix

Leslie Thorne (23 June 1916 – 13 July 1993) was a British racing driver from Scotland. He participated in one Formula One World Championship Grand Prix, 1954 British Grand Prix, where he finished 14th and scored no championship points. Thorne also competed in several non-Championship Formula One races.

After his motor-racing career, Thorne settled down as a chartered accountant.

== Complete Formula One World Championship results ==
(key)

Year	Entrant	Chassis	Engine	1	2	3	4	5	6	7	8	9	WDC	Points
1954	Ecurie Ecosse	Connaught Type A	Lea-Francis Straight-4	ARG	500	BEL	FRA	GBR; 14	GER	SUI	ITA	ESP	NC	0
