= 1954 British Grand Prix =

← Previous race	Next race →
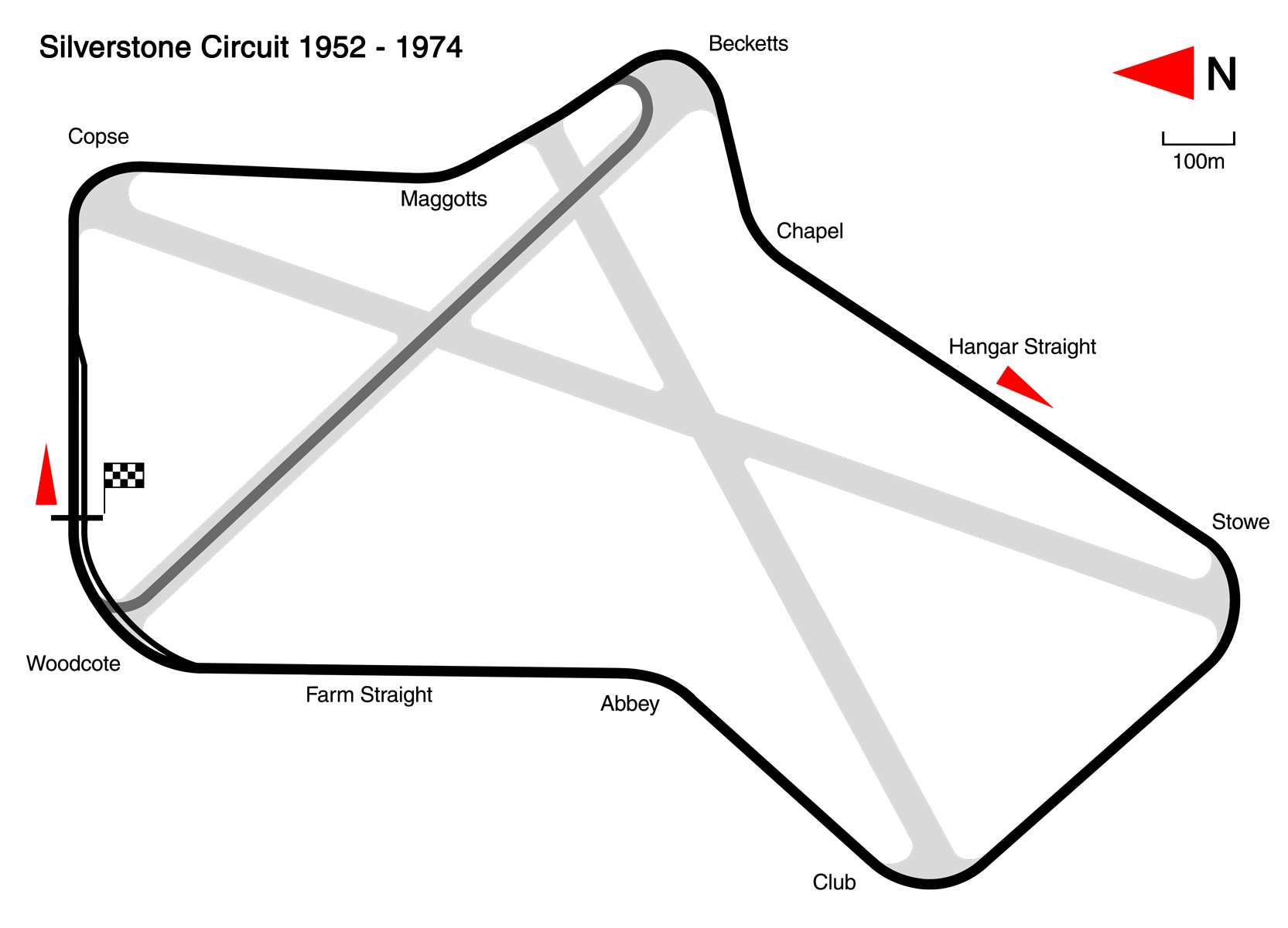
- Silverstone Circuit in 1952–1973 configuration

Race details
- Date: 17 July 1954
- Official name: 7th RAC British Grand Prix
- Location: Silverstone Circuit; Silverstone, England
- Course: Permanent racing facility
- Course length: 4.7105 km (2.927 miles)
- Distance: 90 laps, 423.949 km (263.43 miles)
- Weather: Cold, wet (heavy rain).
- Attendance: 90,000

Pole position
Driver	(Argentina) Juan Manuel Fangio	Mercedes
- Time: 1:45.0

Fastest lap
Drivers	(Italy) Alberto Ascari	Maserati
	(France) Jean Behra	Gordini
	(Argentina) Juan Manuel Fangio	Mercedes
	(Argentina) José Froilán González	Ferrari
	(United Kingdom) Mike Hawthorn	Ferrari
	(Argentina) Onofre Marimón	Maserati
	(United Kingdom) Stirling Moss	Maserati
- Time: 1:50

Podium
First	(Argentina) José Froilán González	Ferrari
Second	(United Kingdom) Mike Hawthorn	Ferrari
Third	(Argentina) Onofre Marimón	Maserati

The 1954 British Grand Prix was a Formula One motor race held at Silverstone on 17 July 1954. It was race 5 of 9 in the 1954 World Championship of Drivers. The 90-lap race was won by Ferrari driver José Froilán González after he started from second position. His teammate Mike Hawthorn finished second and Maserati driver Onofre Marimón came in third.

== Race report ==
A huge crowd turned out at Silverstone to see if Mercedes could repeat their Reims rout. In the end, just two silver cars arrived (for Fangio and Kling). In contrast, Maserati had nine cars, whilst Ferrari had three for the experienced trio of Hawthorn, Gonzalez and Trintignant. Fangio set Silverstone's fastest ever lap, breaking the 100 mph barrier with a lap of 100.35 mph. It was Gonzalez who led away and held the lead until the flag. Behind him, Fangio passed Hawthorn for second but after colliding several times with oil drums in a difficult handling car, he dropped to fourth. Moss took over the position but retired with rear axle problems, leaving Hawthorn to follow home for a Ferrari 1–2 and young Onofre Marimón to take his second (and last) podium place.

== Entries ==
Team	No	Driver	Car	Engine	Tyre
(Germany) Daimler Benz AG	1	(Argentina) Juan Manuel Fangio	Mercedes-Benz W196	Mercedes M196 2.5 L8	C
(Germany) Daimler Benz AG	2	(Germany) Karl Kling	Mercedes-Benz W196	Mercedes M196 2.5 L8	C
(United States) Harry Schell	3	(United States) Harry Schell	Maserati A6GCM	Maserati A6 2.0 L6	P
(Argentina) Roberto Mieres	4	(Argentina) Roberto Mieres	Maserati A6GCM	Maserati A6 2.0 L6	P
(United Kingdom) Gilby Engineering	5	(United Kingdom) Roy Salvadori	Maserati 250F	Maserati 250F1 2.5 L6	D
(Thailand) Birabongse Bhanudej	6	(Thailand) Prince Bira	Maserati 250F	Maserati 250F1 2.5 L6	P
(United Kingdom) A.E. Moss	7	(United Kingdom) Stirling Moss	Maserati 250F	Maserati 250F1 2.5 L6	P
(United Kingdom) Owen Racing Organisation	8	(United Kingdom) Ken Wharton	Maserati 250F	Maserati 250F1 2.5 L6	D
(Italy) Scuderia Ferrari	9	(Argentina) José Froilán González	Ferrari 625 F1	Ferrari 625 2.5 L4	P
(Italy) Scuderia Ferrari	10	(France) Maurice Trintignant	Ferrari 625 F1	Ferrari 625 2.5 L4	P
(Italy) Scuderia Ferrari	11	(United Kingdom) Mike Hawthorn	Ferrari 625 F1	Ferrari 625 2.5 L4	P
(Italy) Scuderia Ambrosiana	12	(United Kingdom) Reg Parnell	Ferrari 500	Ferrari 500 2.0 L4	A
(France) Ecurie Rosier	14	(France) Robert Manzon	Ferrari 625 F1	Ferrari 625 2.5 L4	P D
(France) Ecurie Rosier	15	(France) Louis Rosier	Ferrari 625 F1	Ferrari 625 2.5 L4	P D
(Belgium) Ecurie Francorchamps	16	(Belgium) Jacques Swaters	Ferrari 625 F1	Ferrari 625 2.5 L4	E
(France) Equipe Gordini	17	(France) Jean Behra	Gordini T16	Gordini 23 2.5 L6	E
(France) Equipe Gordini	18	(Argentina) Clemar Bucci	Gordini T16	Gordini 23 2.5 L6	E
(France) Equipe Gordini	19	(Belgium) André Pilette	Gordini T16	Gordini 23 2.5 L6	E
(United Kingdom) Vandervell Products	20	(United Kingdom) Peter Collins	Vanwall	Vanwall 254 2.5 L4	P
(United Kingdom) Peter Whitehead	21	(United Kingdom) Peter Whitehead	Cooper T24	Alta GP 2.5 L4	D
(United Kingdom) Bill Whitehouse	22	(United Kingdom) Bill Whitehouse	Connaught A	Lea-Francis 2.0 L4	D
(United Kingdom) Leslie Marr	23	(United Kingdom) Leslie Marr	Connaught A	Lea-Francis 2.0 L4	D
(United Kingdom) R.R.C. Walker Racing Team	24	(United Kingdom) John Riseley-Prichard	Connaught A	Lea-Francis 2.0 L4	D
(United Kingdom) Sir Jeremy Boles	25	(United Kingdom) Don Beauman	Connaught A	Lea-Francis 2.0 L4	D
(United Kingdom) Ecurie Ecosse	26	(United Kingdom) Leslie Thorne	Connaught A	Lea-Francis 2.0 L4	D
(United Kingdom) R.J. Chase	27	(United Kingdom) Alan Brown	Cooper T23	Bristol BS1 2.0 L6	D
(United Kingdom) Gould's Garage (Bristol)	28	(United Kingdom) Horace Gould	Cooper T23	Bristol BS1 2.0 L6	D
(United Kingdom) Bob Gerard	29	(United Kingdom) Bob Gerard	Cooper T23	Bristol BS1 2.0 L6	D
(United Kingdom) Ecurie Richmond	30	(United Kingdom) Eric Brandon^{1}	Cooper T23	Bristol BS1 2.0 L6	D
(United Kingdom) Ecurie Richmond	30	(United Kingdom) Rodney Nuckey^{1}	Cooper T23	Bristol BS1 2.0 L6	D
(Italy) Officine Alfieri Maserati	31	(Italy) Alberto Ascari	Maserati 250F	Maserati 250F1 2.5 L6	P
(Italy) Officine Alfieri Maserati	32	(Italy) Luigi Villoresi	Maserati 250F	Maserati 250F1 2.5 L6	P
(Italy) Officine Alfieri Maserati	33	(Argentina) Onofre Marimón	Maserati 250F	Maserati 250F1 2.5 L6	P

^1 — Rodney Nuckey, named substitute driver for Eric Brandon in the #30 Cooper-Bristol, was given a starting position despite not completing a single lap in qualifying or in the race.

== Classification ==
=== Qualifying ===
Pos	No	Driver	Constructor	Time	Gap
1	1	(Argentina) Juan Manuel Fangio	Mercedes	1:45.0	—
2	9	(Argentina) José Froilán González	Ferrari	1:46.0	+ 1.0
3	11	(United Kingdom) Mike Hawthorn	Ferrari	1:46.5	+ 1.5
4	7	(United Kingdom) Stirling Moss	Maserati	1:47.0	+ 2.0
5	17	(France) Jean Behra	Gordini	1:48.0	+ 3.0
6	2	(Germany) Karl Kling	Mercedes	1:48.1	+ 3.1
7	5	(United Kingdom) Roy Salvadori	Maserati	1:48.4	+ 3.4
8	10	(France) Maurice Trintignant	Ferrari	1:48.6	+ 3.6
9	8	(United Kingdom) Ken Wharton	Maserati	1:49.5	+ 4.5
10	6	(Thailand) Prince Bira	Maserati	1:49.6	+ 4.6
11	20	(United Kingdom) Peter Collins	Vanwall	1:50.0	+ 5.0
12	19	(Belgium) André Pilette	Gordini	1:51.0	+ 6.0
13	18	(Argentina) Clemar Bucci	Gordini	1:52.0	+ 7.0
14	12	(United Kingdom) Reg Parnell	Ferrari	1:52.1	+ 7.1
15	14	(France) Robert Manzon	Ferrari	1:52.5	+ 7.5
16	3	(United States) Harry Schell	Maserati	1:53.0	+ 8.0
17	25	(United Kingdom) Don Beauman	Connaught-Lea-Francis	1:55.0	+ 10.0
18	29	(United Kingdom) Bob Gerard	Cooper-Bristol	1:55.3	+ 10.3
19	22	(United Kingdom) Bill Whitehouse	Connaught-Lea-Francis	1:56.0	+ 11.0
20	28	(United Kingdom) Horace Gould	Cooper-Bristol	1:56.7	+ 11.7
21	24	(United Kingdom) John Riseley-Prichard	Connaught-Lea-Francis	1:57.0	+ 12.0
22	23	(United Kingdom) Leslie Marr	Connaught-Lea-Francis	1:57.3	+ 12.3
23	26	(United Kingdom) Leslie Thorne	Connaught-Lea-Francis	1:57.8	+ 12.8
24	21	(United Kingdom) Peter Whitehead	Cooper-Alta	1:59.0	+ 14.0
25	30	(United Kingdom) Eric Brandon^{1}	Cooper-Bristol	1:59.7	+ 14.7
26	27	(United Kingdom) Alan Brown	Cooper-Bristol	2:00.0	+ 15.0
27	32	(Italy) Luigi Villoresi	Maserati	2:02.0	+ 17.0
28	33	(Argentina) Onofre Marimón	Maserati	2:02.6	+ 17.6
29	30	(United Kingdom) Rodney Nuckey^{1}	Cooper-Bristol	No time	—
30	31	(Italy) Alberto Ascari	Maserati	No time	—
31	15	(France) Louis Rosier	Ferrari	No time	—
32	4	(Argentina) Roberto Mieres	Maserati	No time	—
DNA	16	(Belgium) Jacques Swaters	Ferrari	No time	—

^1 — Rodney Nuckey, named substitute driver for Eric Brandon in the #30 Cooper-Bristol, was given a starting position despite not completing a single lap in qualifying or in the race.

=== Race ===
Pos	No	Driver	Constructor	Laps	Time/Retired	Grid	Points
1	9	(Argentina) José Froilán González	Ferrari	90	2:56:14	2	8 1/7^{1}
2	11	(United Kingdom) Mike Hawthorn	Ferrari	90	+ 1:10	3	6 1/7^{1}
3	33	(Argentina) Onofre Marimón	Maserati	89	+ 1 lap	28	4 1/7^{1}
4	1	(Argentina) Juan Manuel Fangio	Mercedes	89	+ 1 lap	1	3 1/7^{1}
5	10	(France) Maurice Trintignant	Ferrari	87	+ 3 laps	8	2
6	4	(Argentina) Roberto Mieres	Maserati	87	+ 3 laps	32	
7	2	(Germany) Karl Kling	Mercedes	87	+ 3 laps	6	
8	8	(United Kingdom) Ken Wharton	Maserati	86	+ 4 laps	9	
9	19	(Belgium) André Pilette	Gordini	86	+ 4 laps	12	
10	29	(United Kingdom) Bob Gerard	Cooper-Bristol	85	+ 5 laps	18	
11	25	(United Kingdom) Don Beauman	Connaught-Lea-Francis	84	+ 6 laps	17	
12	3	(United States) Harry Schell	Maserati	83	+ 7 laps	16	
13	23	(United Kingdom) Leslie Marr	Connaught-Lea-Francis	82	+ 8 laps	22	
14	26	(United Kingdom) Leslie Thorne	Connaught-Lea-Francis	78	+ 12 laps	23	
15	28	(United Kingdom) Horace Gould	Cooper-Bristol	44	+ 46 laps	20	
Ret	7	(United Kingdom) Stirling Moss	Maserati	80	Axle	4	1/7^{1}
Ret	22	(United Kingdom) Bill Whitehouse	Connaught-Lea-Francis	63	Fuel system	19	
Ret	17	(France) Jean Behra	Gordini	54	Suspension	5	1/7^{1}
Ret	5	(United Kingdom) Roy Salvadori	Maserati	53	Transmission	7	
Ret	6	(Thailand) Prince Bira (United Kingdom) Ron Flockhart	Maserati	44	Accident	10	
Ret	32	(Italy) Luigi Villoresi (Italy) Alberto Ascari	Maserati	40	Engine	27	
Ret	24	(United Kingdom) John Riseley-Prichard	Connaught-Lea-Francis	40	Accident	21	
Ret	12	(United Kingdom) Reg Parnell	Ferrari	25	Engine	14	
Ret	31	(Italy) Alberto Ascari	Maserati	21	Engine	30	1/7^{1}
Ret	18	(Argentina) Clemar Bucci	Gordini	18	Accident	13	
Ret	20	(United Kingdom) Peter Collins	Vanwall	16	Engine	11	
Ret	14	(France) Robert Manzon	Ferrari	16	Engine	15	
Ret	21	(United Kingdom) Peter Whitehead	Cooper-Alta	4	Oil leak	24	
Ret	30	(United Kingdom) Eric Brandon	Cooper-Bristol	2	Engine	25	
Ret	15	(France) Louis Rosier	Ferrari	2	Engine	31	
DNS	27	(United Kingdom) Alan Brown	Cooper-Bristol		Non-starter	26	
DNS	30	(United Kingdom) Rodney Nuckey	Cooper-Bristol		Non-starter	29	

Notes

- ^1 – Ascari, Behra, Fangio, González, Hawthorn, Marimón and Moss all set the equal fastest lap time of 1:50. Each received 1/7 of a point.

== Shared drives ==
- Car #6: Bira (42 laps) then Flockhart (2 laps)
- Car #32: Villoresi (30 laps) then Ascari (10 laps)

== Championship standings after the race ==
Drivers' Championship standings

	Pos	Driver	Points
	1	(Argentina) Juan Manuel Fangio	28 1/7
2	2	(Argentina) José Froilán González	14 9/14
1	3	(France) Maurice Trintignant	11
1	4	(United States) Bill Vukovich	8
11	5	(United Kingdom) Mike Hawthorn	7 9/14

- Note: Only the top five positions are included. Only the best 5 results counted towards the Championship.

Previous race: 1954 French Grand Prix	FIA Formula One World Championship; 1954 season	Next race: 1954 German Grand Prix
Previous race: 1953 British Grand Prix	British Grand Prix	Next race: 1955 British Grand Prix
