= Rob Walker Racing Team =

Formula One team (1953–1970)

Rob Walker Racing
- Full name: R.R.C. Walker Racing Team
- Base: Dorking, Surrey, UK
- Founder(s): Rob Walker
- Noted drivers: (United Kingdom) Stirling Moss (Australia) Jack Brabham (France) Maurice Trintignant (Sweden) Jo Bonnier (Switzerland) Jo Siffert (United Kingdom) Graham Hill (Austria) Jochen Rindt

Formula One World Championship career
- First entry: 1953 British Grand Prix
- Races entered: 124
- Constructors: Connaught; Cooper; Lotus; Ferguson; Brabham
- Race victories: 9
- Pole positions: 10
- Fastest laps: 9
- Final entry: 1970 Mexican Grand Prix

Rob Walker Racing Team was a privateer team in Formula One during the 1950s and 1960s. Founded by Johnnie Walker heir Rob Walker (1917–2002) in 1953, the team became F1's most successful privateer in history, being the first and (along with FISA team) only entrant to win a World Championship Formula One Grand Prix without ever building their own car.

== Beginnings ==
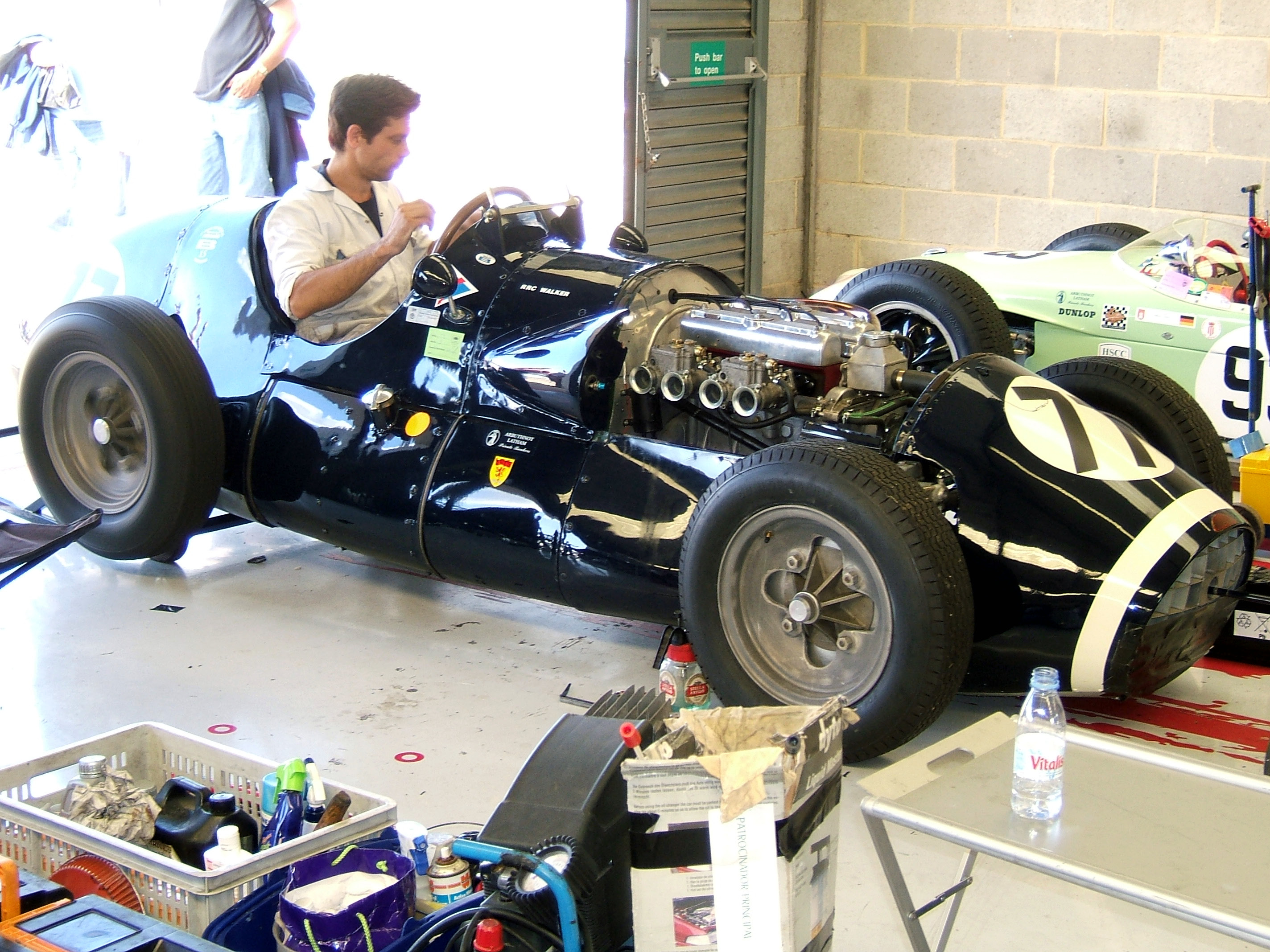
Rob Walker Racing A Type Connaught, the first RWR car, being tuned in the pits.

Born in 1917, the 35-year-old Rob Walker founded his team in 1953, debuting in the Lavant Cup Formula 2 race, entering a Connaught for driver Tony Rolt, where he achieved a third place. The next race, at Snetterton, Eric Thompson was the first winner with a Rob Walker car. Between Rolt and Thompson, the Rob Walker Racing Team had an auspicious debut season, with eight wins in British club racing series. Their international debut was at the Rouen Grand Prix, a mixed F1/F2 race, with Stirling Moss's Cooper-Alta, who managed to take 4th place among the F2 cars. The 1953 British Grand Prix was Walker's first World Championship outing, but Rolt's Connaught did not last the full distance.

Walker, who entered his cars in Scottish national colours (blue with a white stripe, instead of the more common British racing green), continued to race in British club events in the following years. From 1954 to 1956, Walker made a few scattered appearances, only winning a Formula 2 race at Brands Hatch in 1956 with Tony Brooks. Walker returned full-time in 1957 with an F2 Cooper-Climax. Tony Brooks, who shared driving duties during the season with Jack Brabham and Noel Cunningham-Reid, won the Lavant Cup, but the team failed to finish most of its races.

== Internationalization ==
In 1958, Rob Walker abandoned club racing and concentrated only on the large international events. Pre-WWII veteran Maurice Trintignant was signed full-time, with Moss and Brooks racing when they were free from their Vanwall commitments. The season started well enough for the team, with Moss and Trintignant winning at Argentina and Monaco, the first wins for a Cooper chassis. Those would be the only World Championship victories, but Trintignant also triumphed at Pau and Auvergne, while Moss took the victory at the BARC 200, Caen Grand Prix and Kentish 100.

Moss and Trintignant remained with the team for 1959, with the British driver winning at the Glover Trophy in Goodwood, but for the French and British GP races, he left Walker for his father's British Racing Partnership outfit, where he failed to score. Moss returned in the German Grand Prix, where he retired, but returned to winning form in Portugal, Italy and International Gold Cup. Trintignant's best score was second place at the US Grand Prix.

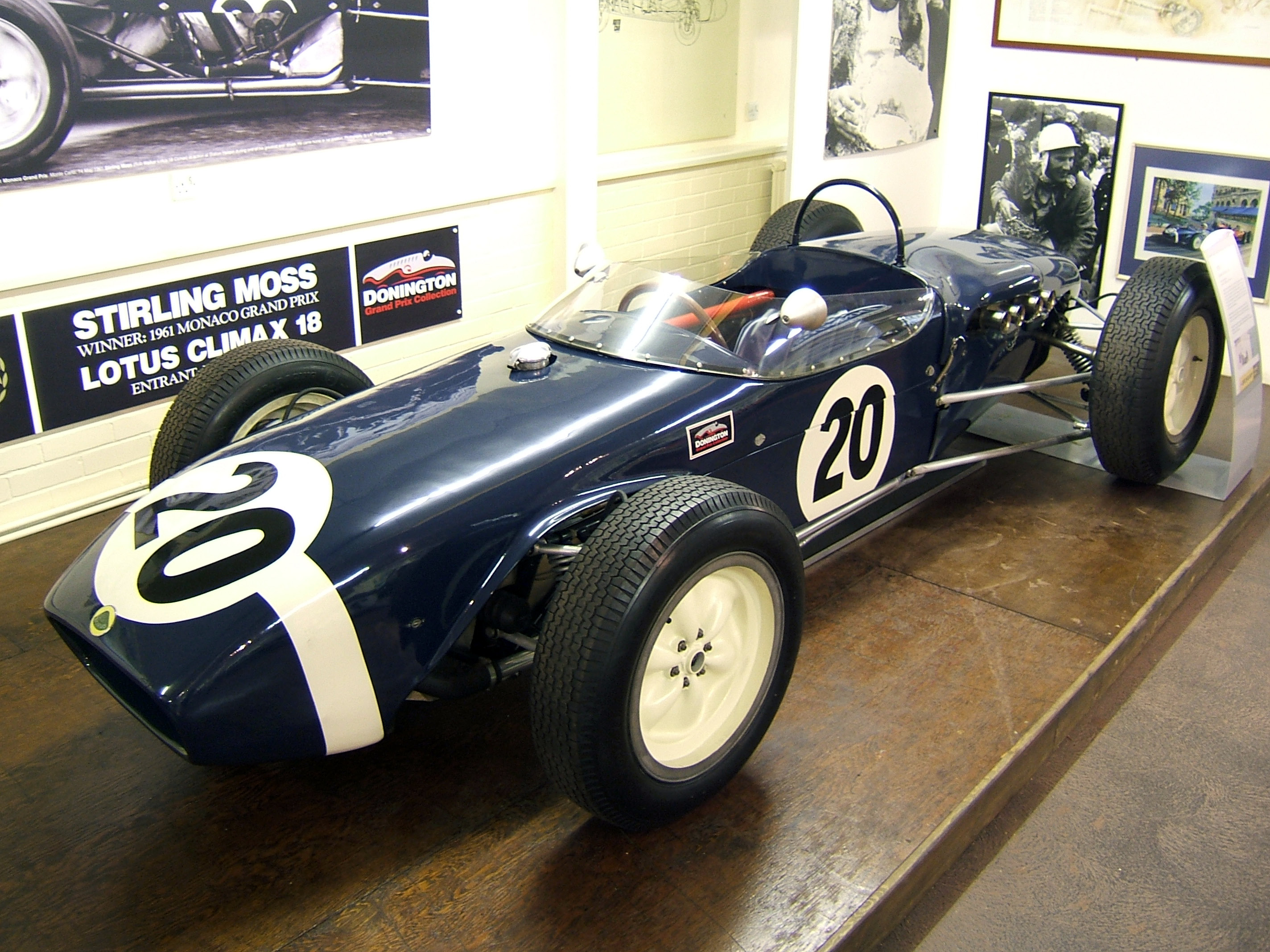
The Lotus 18 with which Stirling Moss took victory in the 1961 Monaco Grand Prix.

Walker decided to concentrate solely on Moss and switched to a Lotus in 1960, starting from Monaco, which Moss won, the first time a Lotus won a Formula 1 race. Moss would triumph only at the non-championship International Gold Cup in Oulton Park and the US GP at Riverside, but still managed to finish the season in third place overall, as had happened the previous year. After the end of the season, in December, Walker took Moss to two South African races, which he won.

In 1961, F1 adopted the new 1.5 L engine regulations, and Walker flirted with the idea of building his own chassis, but retained the Lotus 18 for the season. Moss won the non-championship races at Goodwood in the 2.5 L Intercontinental Formula and Vienna, as well as the Monaco and German Grands Prix. At the 1961 British Grand Prix, Rob Walker Racing became the first team ever to enter a four-wheel drive car for a World Championship Grand Prix, when they entered the Ferguson P99 on behalf of Ferguson Research. Moss later won that season's Oulton Park International Gold Cup race in the same car; to date, this is the only win ever recorded by a four-wheel drive car in a Formula One event.

== The post-Moss era ==
The 1962 season started well enough, with the returning Trintignant winning at Pau, but Walker's plans were shaken when Moss had an accident at the Goodwood Glover Trophy meeting driving a BRP-entered Lotus, finishing his career. Walker had planned to enter a Ferrari for the British driver in the World Championship, but was forced to retain Trintignant, the elder French driver becoming increasingly uncompetitive, not scoring a single championship point. The year's misfortunes continued in Mexico and South Africa, where Walker saw drivers Ricardo Rodriguez and Gary Hocking die at the wheel of his cars.

Rob Walker changed strategy for 1963, employing Jo Bonnier and returning to the Cooper chassis (the Swede had raced for Walker at Oulton Park the previous year), but once more results were sparse and mechanical failures frequent. Still, the team beefed up its operations for 1964, first with a new Cooper (with which Bonnier was second at Snetterton) and then with a Brabham-BRM, with Bonnier and other guest drivers driving at several World Championship events. From the Italian GP, Walker had decided to run two cars, a BT11 chassis with BRM power, and a BT7 chassis with Climax power. In 1965, Jo Siffert partnered Bonnier, and although the more experienced Swede was fastest, it was the Swiss who managed to score 5 championship points. With constant mechanical failure plaguing him, Bonnier's best result was a third place at the non-championship Race of Champions.

With the new 3.0 L regulations starting in 1966, Bonnier left Walker to restart Ecurie Bonnier, and Siffert remained alone with Walker, with the Maserati-engined Cooper T81. The car was uncompetitive in 1967, and in 1968 Walker, now partnered with entrepreneur Jack Durlacher, purchased a Cosworth-powered Lotus 49. That year, Siffert won the British Grand Prix through attrition, after the works Lotuses retired, and Siffert overpowered Chris Amon to take what would be Rob Walker's final win.

Siffert left the team at the end of 1969, after finishing the year in 9th place, and Rob Walker Racing Team competed for the last time in 1970, entering a Lotus 72 for driver Graham Hill, who was now 40 years old, and refused to retire after a major accident in the previous year with Lotus. Hill's best score was a 4th placement at the Spanish GP, but he left to join Brabham at the end of the year.

== Walker after Walker Racing ==
=== Retirement from racing ===
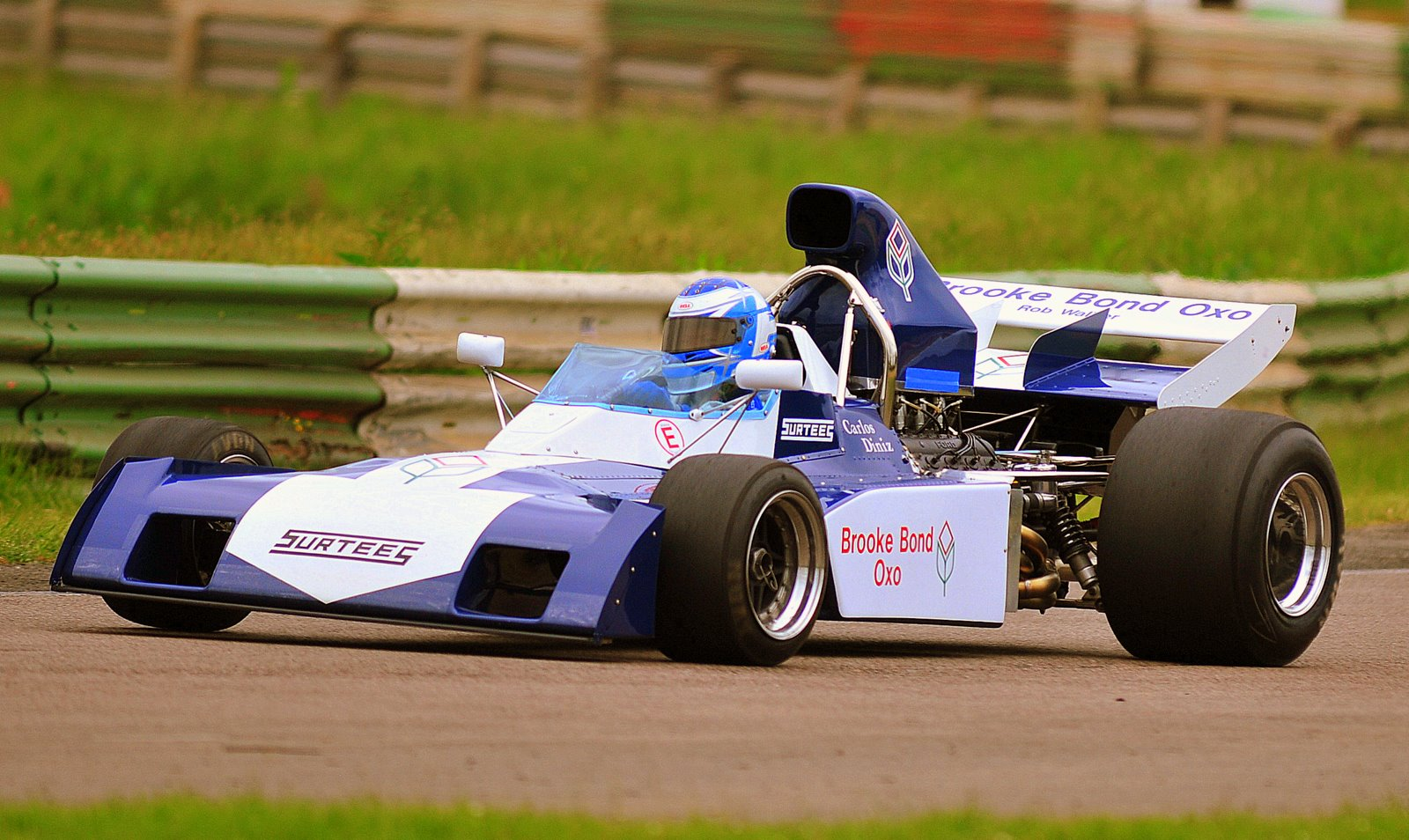
The Rob Walker-liveried Surtees TS9B; the final (1970 season) Rob Walker Formula One car.

Instead of continuing with the team, Rob Walker took his Brooke Bond Oxo sponsorship to Surtees for the 1971-73 seasons, and took to managing Mike Hailwood's career. The last vestiges of Rob Walker Racing Team ended in 1974 when he retired from active participation in motorsports at the age of 57.

=== Journalism ===
Rob Walker also gained some measure of recognition as a motorsports journalist, covering Formula 1 events for Road & Track magazine. Beginning with a report on the Italian Grand Prix in 1967, Walker wrote race reports, annual reviews, and historical articles for Road & Track well into the 1990s.

=== Walker's death and legacy ===
Considered one of the elder statesmen of Grand Prix racing, Walker died at the age of 84 in 2002, of pneumonia.

== Complete Formula One World Championship results ==
(key) (Results in bold indicate pole position; results in italics indicate fastest lap; † indicates shared drive.)

Year	Chassis	Engine(s)	Tyres	Drivers	1	2	3	4	5	6	7	8	9	10	11	12	13
1953	Connaught A	Lea-Francis 2.0 L4	**D**		ARG	500	NED	BEL	FRA	GBR	GER	SUI	ITA				
1953	Connaught A	Lea-Francis 2.0 L4	**D**	(United Kingdom) Tony Rolt						Ret							
1954	Connaught A	Lea-Francis 2.0 L4	**D**		ARG	500	BEL	FRA	GBR	GER	SUI	ITA	ESP				
1954	Connaught A	Lea-Francis 2.0 L4	**D**	(United Kingdom) John Riseley-Prichard					Ret								
1955	Connaught B	Alta GP 2.5 L4	**D**		ARG	MON	500	BEL	NED	GBR	ITA						
1955	Connaught B	Alta GP 2.5 L4	**D**	(United Kingdom) Tony Rolt						Ret							
1955	Connaught B	Alta GP 2.5 L4	**D**	(United Kingdom) Peter Walker						Ret							
1957	Cooper T43	Climax FPF 2.0 L4; Climax FPF 1.5 L4	**D**		ARG	MON	500	FRA	GBR	GER	PES	ITA					
1957	Cooper T43	Climax FPF 2.0 L4; Climax FPF 1.5 L4	**D**	(Australia) Jack Brabham					Ret	Ret^{£}							
1958	Cooper T43; Cooper T45	Climax FPF 2.0 L4; Climax FPF 2.2 L4; Climax FPF 1.5 L4	**C** **D**		ARG	MON	NED	500	BEL	FRA	GBR	GER	POR	ITA	MOR		
1958	Cooper T43; Cooper T45	Climax FPF 2.0 L4; Climax FPF 2.2 L4; Climax FPF 1.5 L4	**C** **D**	(United Kingdom) Stirling Moss	1												
1958	Cooper T43; Cooper T45	Climax FPF 2.0 L4; Climax FPF 2.2 L4; Climax FPF 1.5 L4	**C** **D**	(France) Maurice Trintignant		1	9				8	3	8	Ret	Ret		
1958	Cooper T43; Cooper T45	Climax FPF 2.0 L4; Climax FPF 2.2 L4; Climax FPF 1.5 L4	**C** **D**	(United Kingdom) Ron Flockhart		DNQ											
1958	Cooper T43; Cooper T45	Climax FPF 2.0 L4; Climax FPF 2.2 L4; Climax FPF 1.5 L4	**C** **D**	(Germany) Wolfgang Seidel								Ret^{£}					
1958	Cooper T43; Cooper T45	Climax FPF 2.0 L4; Climax FPF 2.2 L4; Climax FPF 1.5 L4	**C** **D**	(France) François Picard											Ret^{£}		
1959	Cooper T51	Climax FPF 2.5 L4	**D**		MON	500	NED	FRA	GBR	GER	POR	ITA	USA				
1959	Cooper T51	Climax FPF 2.5 L4	**D**	(United Kingdom) Stirling Moss	**Ret**		Ret			Ret	**1**	**1**	**Ret**				
1959	Cooper T51	Climax FPF 2.5 L4	**D**	(France) Maurice Trintignant	3		8	11	5	4	4	9	2				
1960	Cooper T51	Climax FPF 2.5 L4	**D**		ARG	MON	500	NED	BEL	FRA	GBR	POR	ITA	USA			
1960	Cooper T51	Climax FPF 2.5 L4	**D**	(France) Maurice Trintignant	3†												
1960	Cooper T51	Climax FPF 2.5 L4	**D**	(United Kingdom) Stirling Moss	3†/**Ret**												
1960	Lotus 18	Climax FPF 2.5 L4	**D**	(United Kingdom) Stirling Moss		**1**		**4**	DNS			DSQ		**1**			
1961	Lotus 18	Climax FPF 1.5 L4	**D**		MON	NED	BEL	FRA	GBR	GER	ITA	USA					
1961	Lotus 18	Climax FPF 1.5 L4	**D**	(United Kingdom) Stirling Moss	**1**	4											
1961	Lotus 21	Climax FPF 1.5 L4	**D**	(United Kingdom) Stirling Moss							Ret						
1961	Lotus 18/21	Climax FPF 1.5 L4	**D**	(United Kingdom) Stirling Moss			8	Ret	Ret	1		Ret					
1961	Ferguson P99	Climax FPF 1.5 L4	**D**	(United Kingdom) Stirling Moss					DSQ								
1961	Ferguson P99	Climax FPF 1.5 L4	**D**	(United Kingdom) Jack Fairman					DSQ								
1962	Lotus 24	Climax FWMV 1.5 V8	**D**		NED	MON	BEL	FRA	GBR	GER	ITA	USA	RSA				
1962	Lotus 24	Climax FWMV 1.5 V8	**D**	(France) Maurice Trintignant		Ret	8	7		Ret	Ret	Ret					
1963	Cooper T60	Climax FWMV 1.5 V8	**D**		MON	BEL	NED	FRA	GBR	GER	ITA	USA	MEX	RSA			
1963	Cooper T60	Climax FWMV 1.5 V8	**D**	(Sweden) Joakim Bonnier	7	5	11	NC									
1963	Cooper T66	Climax FWMV 1.5 V8	**D**	(Sweden) Joakim Bonnier					Ret	6	7	8	5	6			
1964	Cooper T66	Climax FWMV 1.5 V8	**D**		MON	NED	BEL	FRA	GBR	GER	AUT	ITA	USA	MEX			
1964	Cooper T66	Climax FWMV 1.5 V8	**D**	(Germany) Edgar Barth						Ret							
1964	Cooper T66	Climax FWMV 1.5 V8	**D**	(Sweden) Joakim Bonnier	5												
1964	Brabham BT7	Climax FWMV 1.5 V8	**D**	(Sweden) Joakim Bonnier							6	12	Ret	Ret			
1964	Brabham BT11	BRM 56 1.5 V8	**D**	(Sweden) Joakim Bonnier		9	Ret		Ret	Ret							
1964	Brabham BT11	BRM 56 1.5 V8	**D**	(Austria) Jochen Rindt							Ret						
1964	Brabham BT11	BRM 56 1.5 V8	**D**	(Italy) "Geki"								DNQ					
1964	Brabham BT11	BRM 56 1.5 V8	**D**	(Switzerland) Jo Siffert									3	Ret			
1964	Brabham BT11	BRM 56 1.5 V8	**D**	(United States) Hap Sharp									NC	13			
1965	Brabham BT7; Brabham BT11	Climax FWMV 1.5 V8; BRM 56 1.5 V8	**D**		RSA	MON	BEL	FRA	GBR	NED	GER	ITA	USA	MEX			
1965	Brabham BT7; Brabham BT11	Climax FWMV 1.5 V8; BRM 56 1.5 V8	**D**	(Sweden) Joakim Bonnier	Ret	7	Ret	Ret	7	Ret	7	7	8	Ret			
1965	Brabham BT7; Brabham BT11	Climax FWMV 1.5 V8; BRM 56 1.5 V8	**D**	(Switzerland) Jo Siffert	7	6	8	6	9	13	Ret	Ret	11	4			
1966	Brabham BT11	BRM 1.9 V8	**D**		MON	BEL	FRA	GBR	NED	GER	ITA	USA	MEX				
1966	Brabham BT11	BRM 1.9 V8	**D**	(Switzerland) Jo Siffert	Ret												
1966	Cooper T81	Maserati 3.0 V12	**D**	(Switzerland) Jo Siffert		Ret	Ret	NC	Ret		Ret	4	Ret				
1967	Cooper T81	Maserati 3.0 V12	**F**		RSA	MON	NED	BEL	FRA	GBR	GER	CAN	ITA	USA	MEX		
1967	Cooper T81	Maserati 3.0 V12	**F**	(Switzerland) Jo Siffert	Ret	Ret	10	7	4	Ret	Ret	DNS	Ret	4	12		
1968	Cooper T81	Maserati 3.0 V12	**F**		RSA	ESP	MON	BEL	NED	FRA	GBR	GER	ITA	CAN	USA	MEX	
1968	Cooper T81	Maserati 3.0 V12	**F**	(Switzerland) Jo Siffert	7												
1968	Lotus 49	Ford Cosworth DFV 3.0 V8	**F**	(Switzerland) Jo Siffert		Ret	Ret	7	Ret	11							
1968	Lotus 49B	Ford Cosworth DFV 3.0 V8	**F**	(Switzerland) Jo Siffert							1	Ret	Ret	Ret	5	**6**	
1969	Lotus 49B	Ford Cosworth DFV 3.0 V8	**F**		RSA	ESP	MON	NED	FRA	GBR	GER	ITA	CAN	USA	MEX		
1969	Lotus 49B	Ford Cosworth DFV 3.0 V8	**F**	(Switzerland) Jo Siffert	4	Ret	3	2	9	8	11^{‡}	8	Ret	Ret	Ret		
1970	Lotus 49C	Ford Cosworth DFV 3.0 V8	**F**		RSA	ESP	MON	BEL	NED	FRA	GBR	GER	AUT	ITA	CAN	USA	MEX
1970	Lotus 49C	Ford Cosworth DFV 3.0 V8	**F**	(United Kingdom) Graham Hill	6	4	5	Ret	NC	10	6	Ret					
1970	Lotus 72C	Ford Cosworth DFV 3.0 V8	**F**	(United Kingdom) Graham Hill										DNS	NC	Ret	Ret

^{£} Formula Two car

^{‡} Formula Two cars occupied fifth to tenth positions on the road in the 1969 German Grand Prix. However, as the Formula Two cars were technically competing in a separate race drivers of these cars were not eligible for championship points. The points for fifth and sixth were awarded to the drivers of the eleventh and twelfth placed cars.
