= John Riseley-Prichard =

British racing driver (1924–1993)

- Born: 17 January 1924; Hereford, England, UK
- Died: 8 July 1993 (aged 69); Baan Kai Thuan, Thailand

Formula One World Championship career
- Nationality: (United Kingdom) British
- Active years: 1954
- Team: Rob Walker Racing Team
- Entries: 1
- Championships: 0
- Wins: 0
- Podiums: 0
- Career points: 0
- Pole positions: 0
- Fastest laps: 0
- First entry: 1954 British Grand Prix

John Henry Estlin Augustin Prichard, later Riseley-Prichard, (17 January 1924 – 8 July 1993) was a British insurance broker and racing driver.

After getting a taste for motorsport in a road-going Riley, he bought a second-hand Connaught Type A from the Rob Walker Racing Team. Using this vehicle he participated in one Formula One World Championship Grand Prix: the British Grand Prix on 17 July 1954. He spun out of the race, scoring no championship points. In addition to this he competed in a number of non-Championship Formula One and Formula Libre races, including a victory in the 1954 I Cornwall MRC Formula 1 Race.

Riseley-Prichard shared an Aston Martin in the infamous 1955 24 Hours of Le Mans race with Tony Brooks, but after the trauma of this event retired from race driving. Later in the same year, he let Brooks take the wheel of his Connaught, giving the future Vanwall and Ferrari star his first big break.

Later in life, Riseley-Prichard became the centre of a child pornography scandal, and he emigrated to Thailand. After a lengthy illness he died in Baan Kai Thuan, a remote village approximately 200 kilometres (120 miles) inland of Bangkok.

== Complete Formula One World Championship results ==
(key)

Year	Entrant	Chassis	Engine	1	2	3	4	5	6	7	8	9	WDC	Points
1954	RRC Walker Racing Team	Connaught A Type	Lea-Francis Straight-4	ARG	500	BEL	FRA	GBR; Ret	GER	SUI	ITA	ESP	NC	0
