= Bill Whitehouse =

British racing driver (1909–1958)

- Born: 1 April 1909; Plumstead, London, England
- Died: 14 July 1957 (aged 48); Reims, France

Formula One World Championship career
- Nationality: (United Kingdom) British
- Active years: 1954
- Team: privateer Connaught
- Entries: 1
- Championships: 0
- Wins: 0
- Podiums: 0
- Career points: 0
- Pole positions: 0
- Fastest laps: 0
- First entry: 1954 British Grand Prix

William James Whitehouse (1 April 1909 in Plumstead – 14 July 1957 at Reims) was a British racing driver from England.

Whitehouse started racing in a Cooper 500 in 1949 in 500 cc Car Club National races (later Formula 3). Several wins and top placings followed and through this he became friends with fellow car dealer Bernie Ecclestone. He participated in one Formula One World Championship Grand Prix, on 17 July 1954. He retired from the race with fuel system problems, and scored no World Championship points. He also competed in several non-Championship Formula One races.

Whitehouse was the owner of Westmount Garage in Blendon, Bexley, Kent. This Garage was later the base for the Gemini Formula Junior Team.

Whitehouse was killed in a Formula Two crash at the Reims Circuit driving a works car, loaned after his privately entered Cooper T39 had engine failure. Later in that race the American Herbert MacKay-Fraser was also killed.

== Complete Formula One World Championship results ==
(key)

Year	Entrant	Chassis	Engine	1	2	3	4	5	6	7	8	9	WDC	Points
1954	Bill Whitehouse	Connaught Type A	Lea-Francis Straight-4	ARG	500	BEL	FRA	GBR; Ret	GER	SUI	ITA	ESP	NC	0
