= Connaught Type A =

Formula Two race car

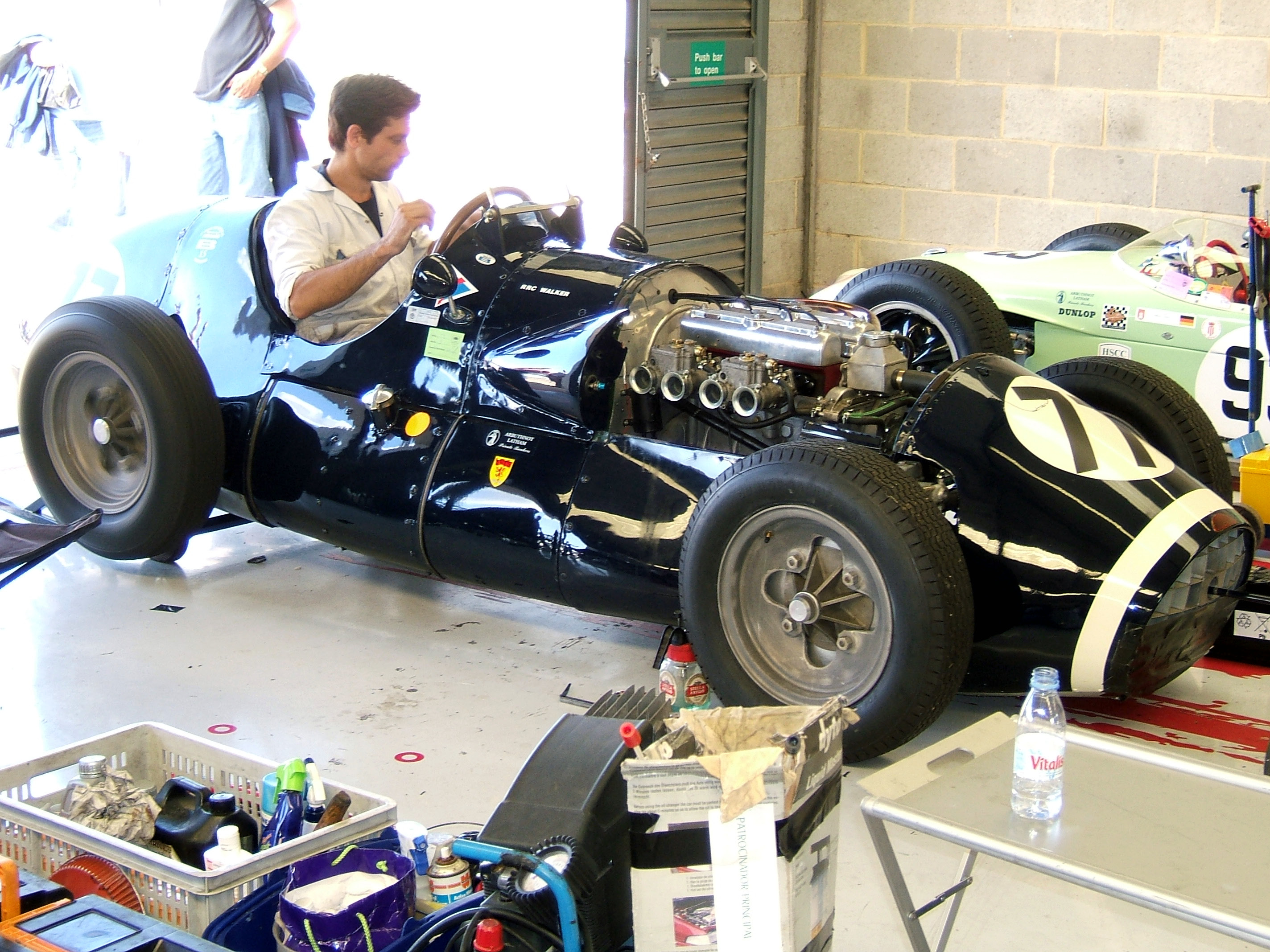
- Category: Formula Two
- Constructor: Connaught Engineering
- Designers: Mike Oliver; Rodney Clarke
- Successor: Connaught Type B

Technical specifications
- Chassis: tubular ladder chassis supporting spaceframe with aluminium bodywork
- Suspension (front): Independent double wishbones with torsion bars
- Suspension (rear): De Dion tube, torsion bars
- Engine: Lea Francis 1,960 cc (119.6 cu in) straight 4 naturally aspirated, front engine, longitudinally mounted
- Transmission: 4 speed manual preselector gearbox
- Tyres: D

Competition history
- Notable entrants: Connaught Engineering
- Debut: 1952 British Grand Prix
- Last event: 1954 British Grand Prix
Races	Wins	Poles	F/Laps
10	0	0	0
- Constructors' Championships: 0 (Note that the Constructors' Championship was first awarded in 1958)
- Drivers' Championships: 0
- Unless otherwise stated, all data refer to Formula One World Championship Grands Prix only.

The Connaught Type A was a Formula Two race car, designed, developed, and built by British manufacturer Connaught Engineering in 1950 and used until the late 1950s.

== History ==
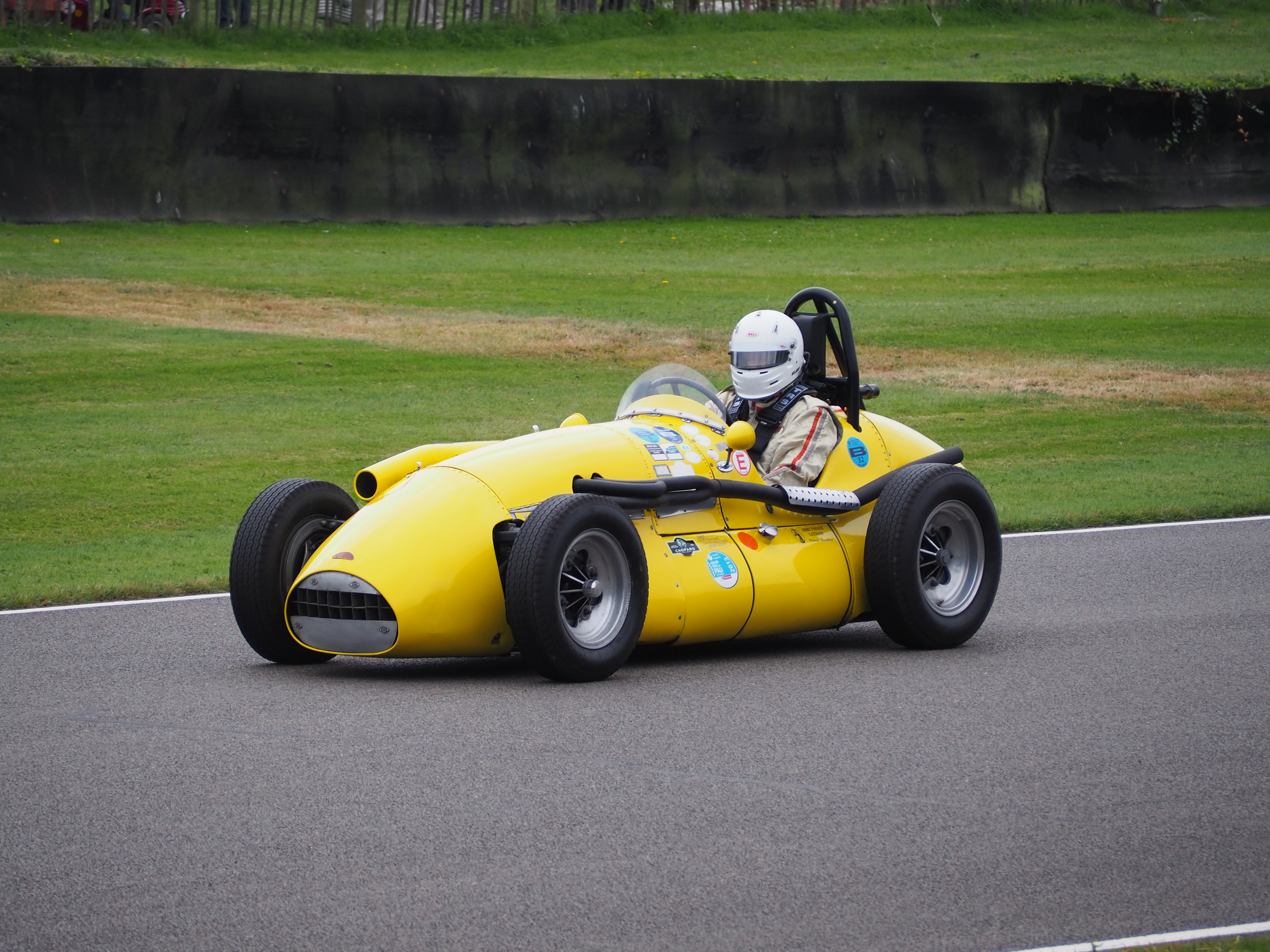
Connaught Type A in Ecurie Belge colours, Goodwood Revival 2021

Nine Type A units were built between 1950 and 1953. A tenth car was built up from a bare chassis in 1961. All A-Types had a conventional space frame and independent suspension with wishbones and torsion bars on all wheels. The rear suspensions were replaced with De Dion axles during the 1951 racing season. The cars were powered by Lea Francis four-cylinder engines that delivered 135 hp.

This performance was not outstanding even for a Formula 2 car, so Lea-Francis improved the engine. When the world championship races were held in Formula 2 cars in 1952, the engine had an output of 165 hp according to the factory. The A-Types also got fuel injection. One privateer car, chassis number A8, was converted to take an Alta 2.5 litre engine in an unsuccessful attempt to be competitive in Formula One category.

On the racetracks, the Connaughts were welcome additions to the starting grid. The racing cars were never capable of winning, even when top drivers such as Johnny Claes, Jack Fairman, Tony Rolt, Bill Whitehouse, and Roy Salvadori drove them. At the 1952 British Grand Prix, Dennis Poore and Eric Thompson finished fourth and fifth in the race.
