= Connaught Engineering =

Formula One and sports car constructor from the United Kingdom

(United Kingdom) Connaught
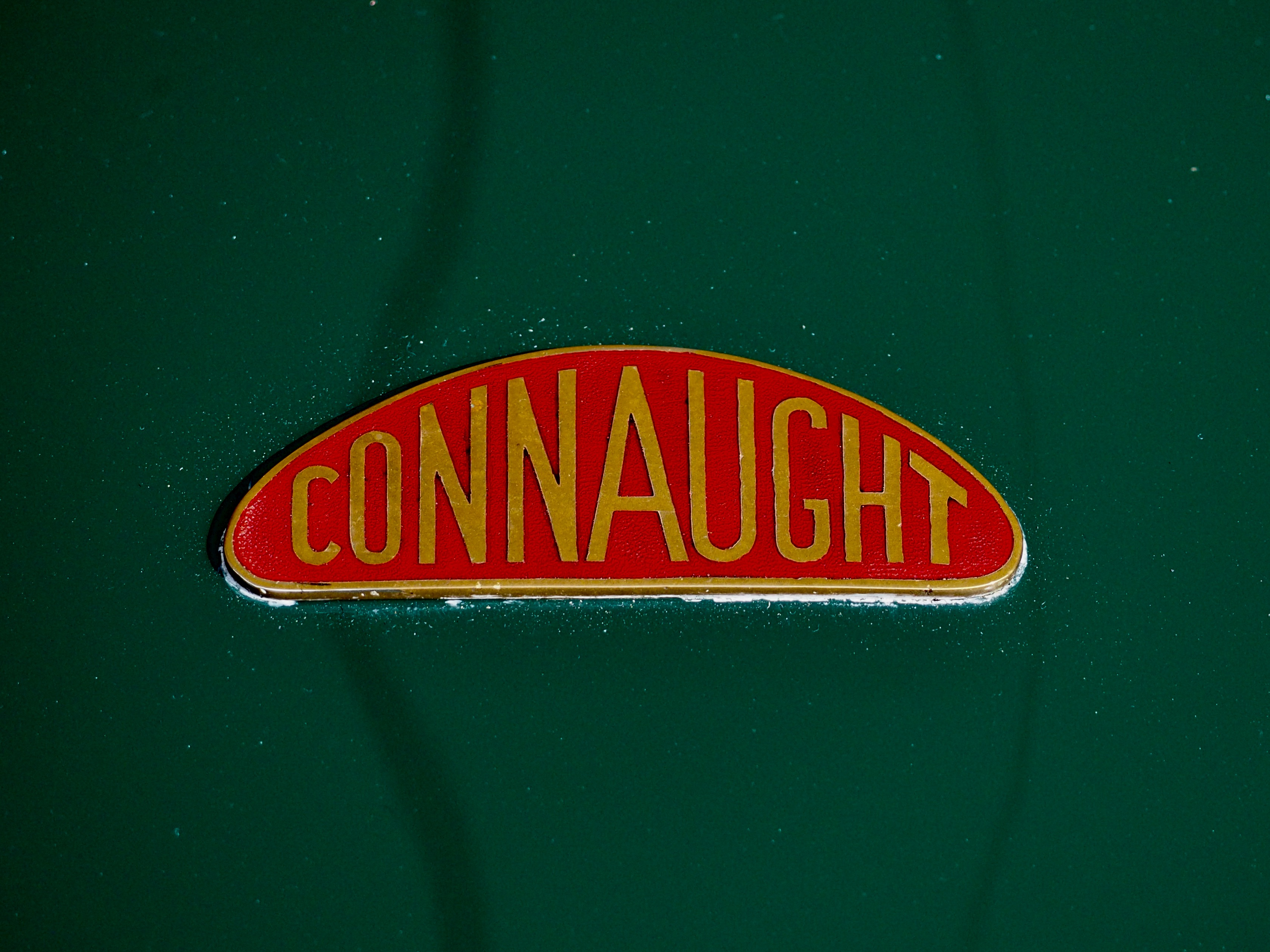
- Full name: (United Kingdom) Connaught Engineering
- Base: Send, Surrey, United Kingdom
- Founder(s): Rodney Clarke; Mike Oliver
- Noted staff: Kenneth McAlpine
- Noted drivers: (United Kingdom) Stuart Lewis-Evans (United Kingdom) Stirling Moss (Thailand) Prince Bira (United Kingdom) Kenneth McAlpine

Formula One World Championship career
- First entry: 1952 British Grand Prix
- Races entered: 18
- Constructors' Championships: 0
- Drivers' Championships: 0
- Race victories: 0
- Pole positions: 0
- Fastest laps: 0
- Final entry: 1959 United States Grand Prix

Connaught Engineering, often referred to simply as Connaught, was a Formula One, Formula Two and other sports car divisions constructor from the United Kingdom. Their cars participated in 18 Grands Prix, entering a total of 52 races with their A, B, and C Type Formula 2 and Formula 1 Grand Prix Cars. They achieved 1 podium and scored 17 championship points. The name Connaught is said to derive from abbreviating Continental Autos, the garage in Send, Surrey, where the cars were built and which specialised in sales and repair of European sports cars such as Bugatti, but given the spelling may reference the Irish province of Connaught.

== History ==
In 1950, the first single-seaters, the Formula 2 "A" types, used an engine that was developed by Connaught from the Lea-Francis engine used in their "L" type sports cars. The engine was extensively re-engineered and therefore is truly a Connaught engine. The cars were of conventional construction for the time with drive through a preselector gearbox to a de Dion rear axle. In 1952 and 1953, the Grand Prix races counting towards the World Championship were to Formula 2 rules so drivers of these cars could take part in those events as the table below shows.

Connaught designed a new car for the 2½ litre Formula 1 of 1954 which was to have a rear-mounted Coventry Climax V8 engine (the "Godiva"), but when the engine was not proceeded with, a conventionally arranged "B" type was designed using an Alta engine developed into 2½ litre form. The first cars were built with all-enveloping aerodynamic bodywork but later rebodied conventionally (as the photos below show). In 1955, driving a Connaught in this form, Tony Brooks scored the first win in a Grand Prix by a British driver in a British car since 1923, in a non World Championship race at Syracuse. Thereafter the "B" type has been known as the "Syracuse" Connaught; the name was also used for the car presented in the 2004 revival.

In 1962, Jack Fairman attempted to qualify for the Indianapolis 500 in a Connaught race car, but failed to find the necessary speed to make the field.

== Sports cars ==
Prior to the single-seat racing cars they built a small number of road going sports cars developed on the Lea-Francis Sports Chassis, which achieved considerable competition success. These were of types L2 and L3, and three examples of the stark Cycle Winged L3/SR Sports Racer. Two sports cars, based on the A Type Formula 2 cars, the ALSRs were also built for competition work.

In 2004, the Connaught name was revived by Connaught Motor Company for their Type D Syracuse and Type D-H hybrid sports cars.

== Gallery ==
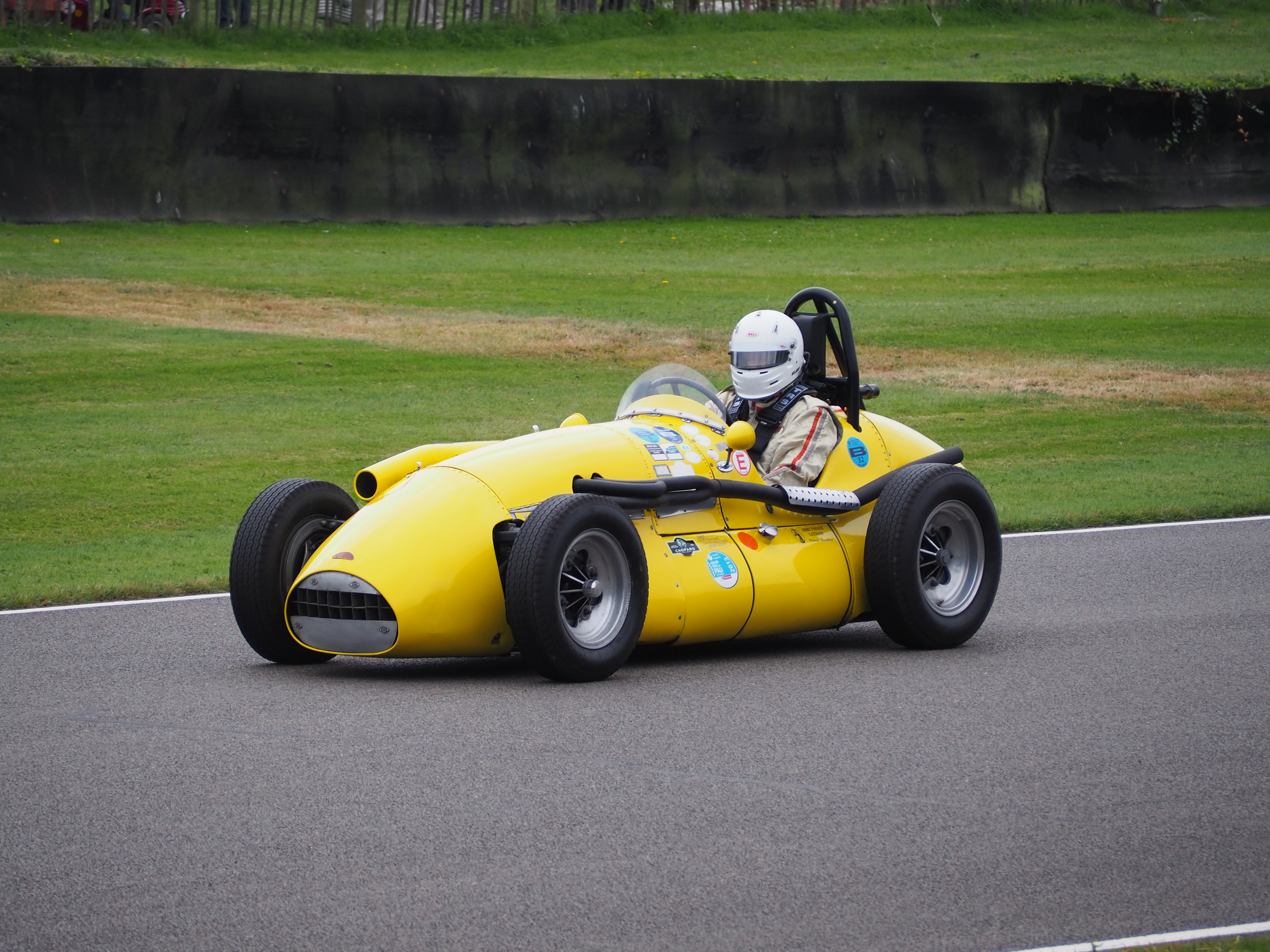
Connaught Type A in Ecurie Belge colours

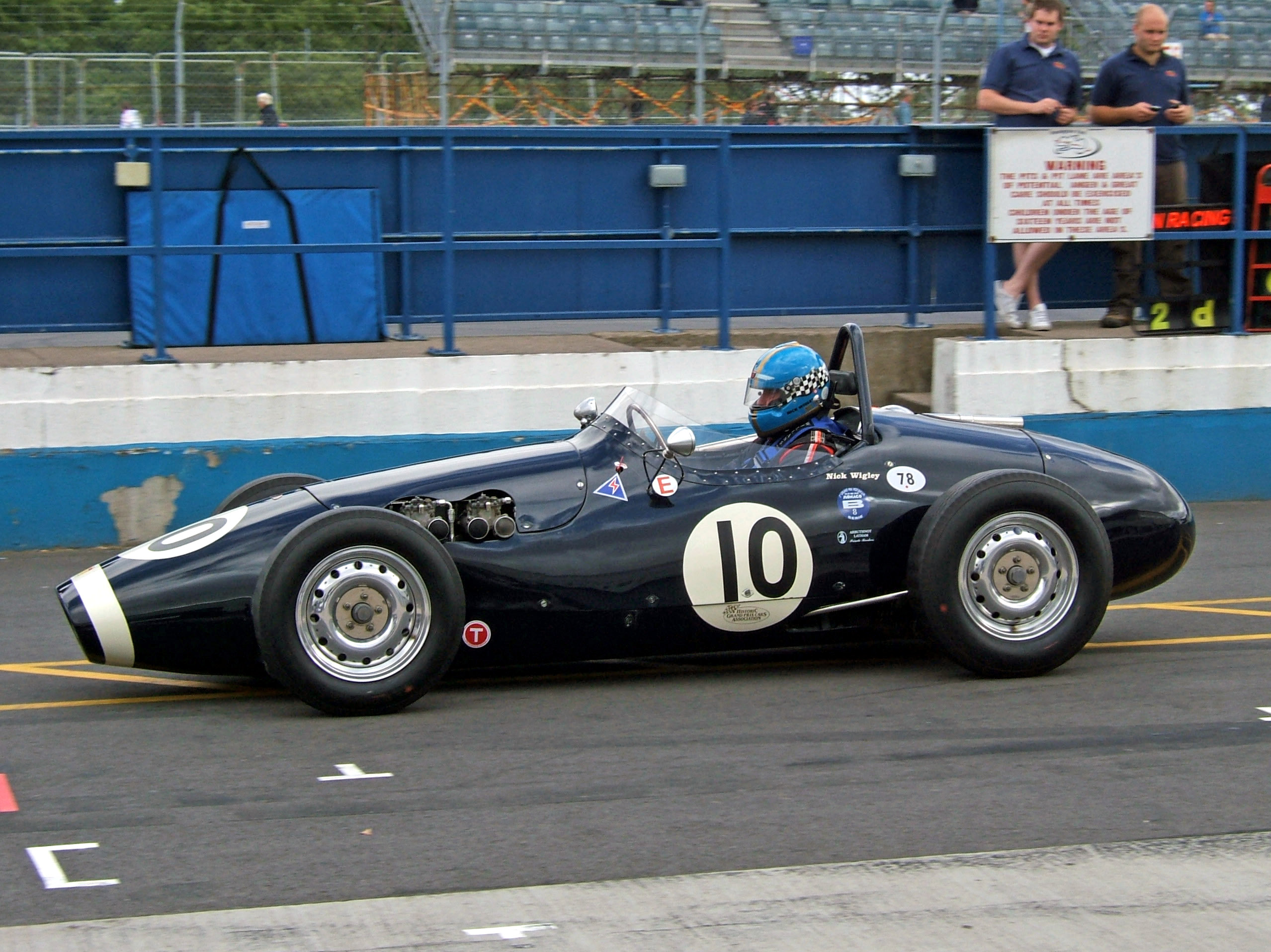
An ex-Rob Walker Racing Team Connaught Type B Formula One car

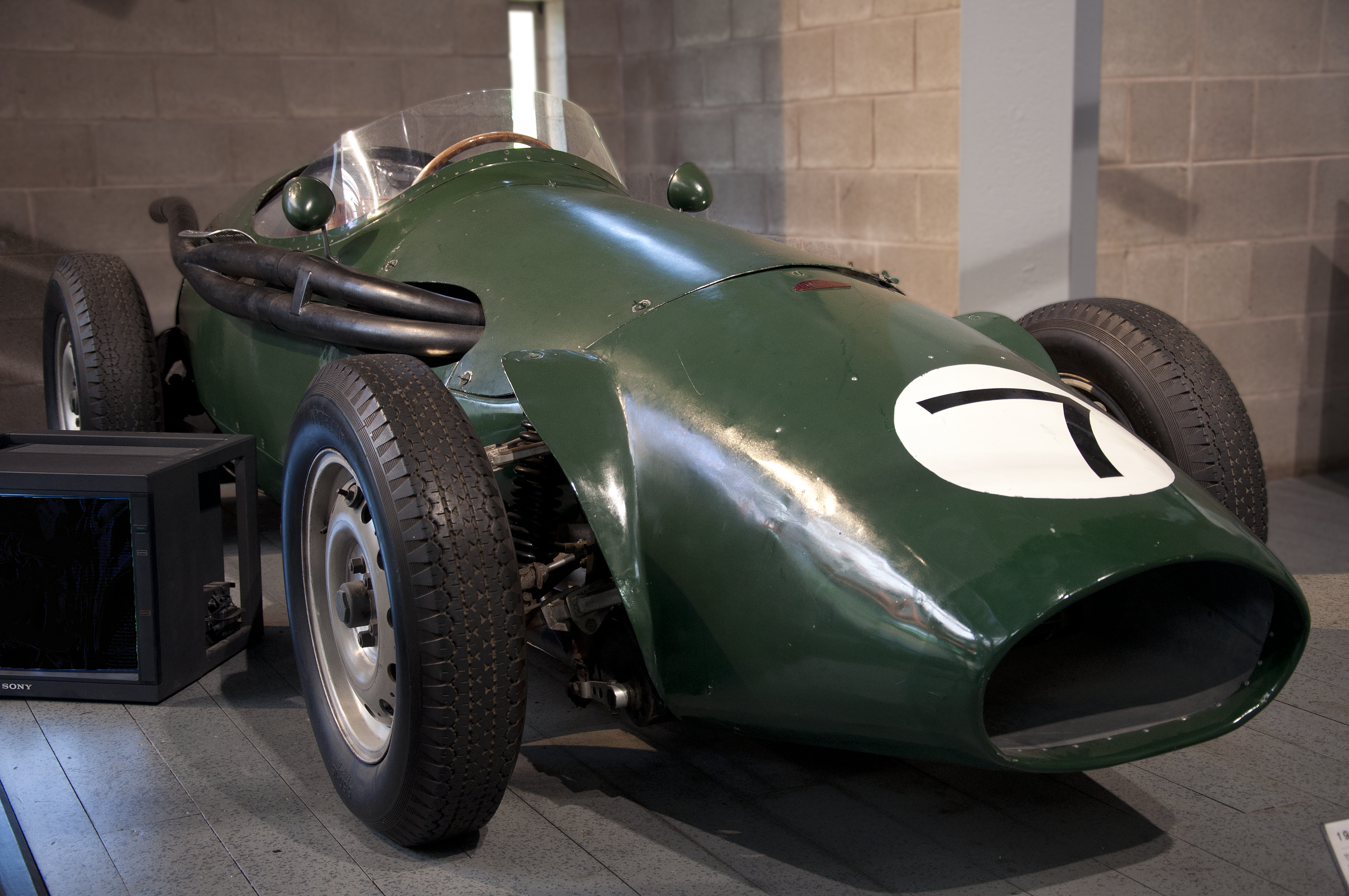
Connaught Type B, 1955, at the National Motor Museum

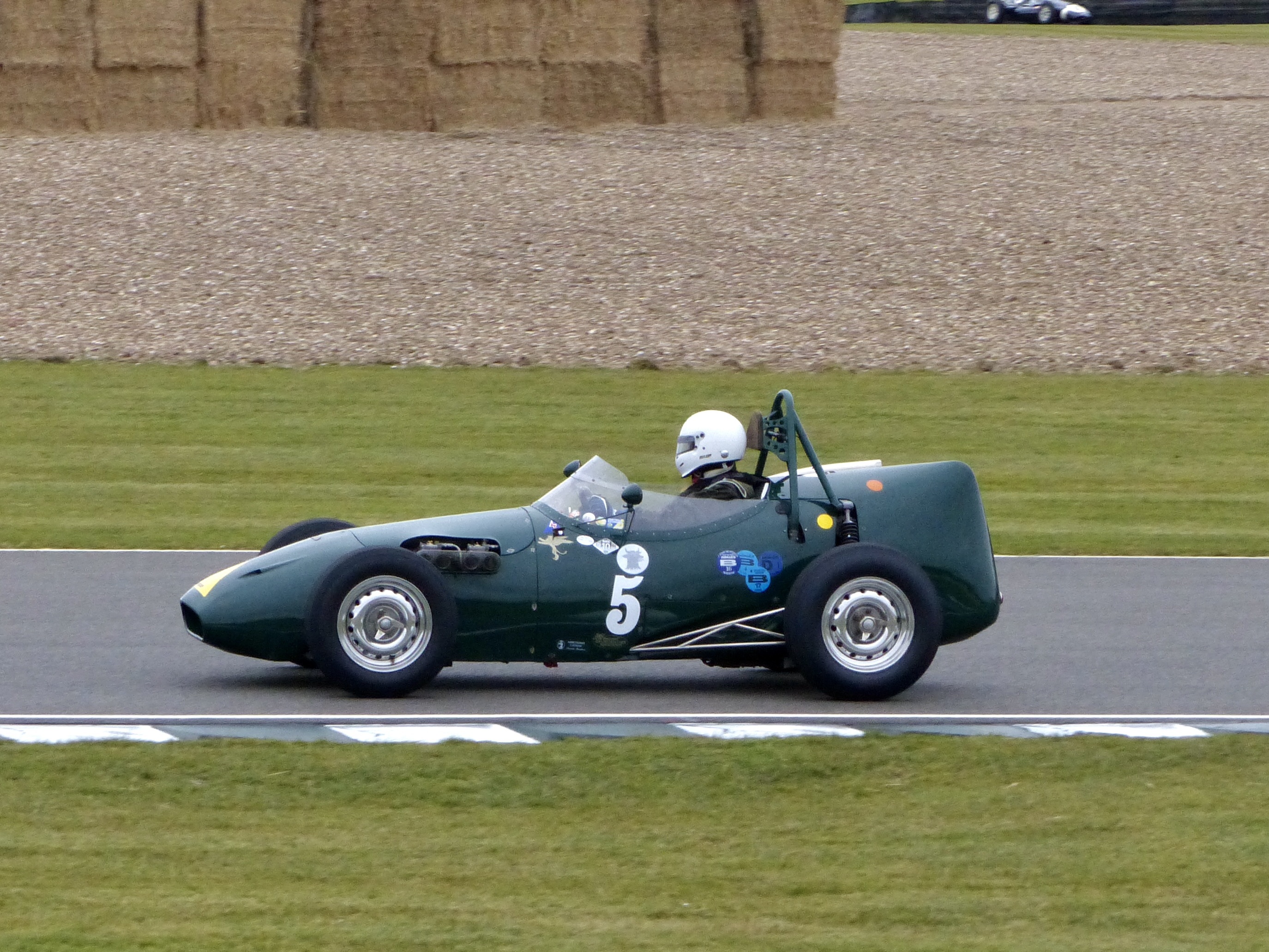
Connaught Type C at the 2016 Goodwood Members' Meeting, driven by Michael Steele

Connaught L3-SR by The Creative Workshop

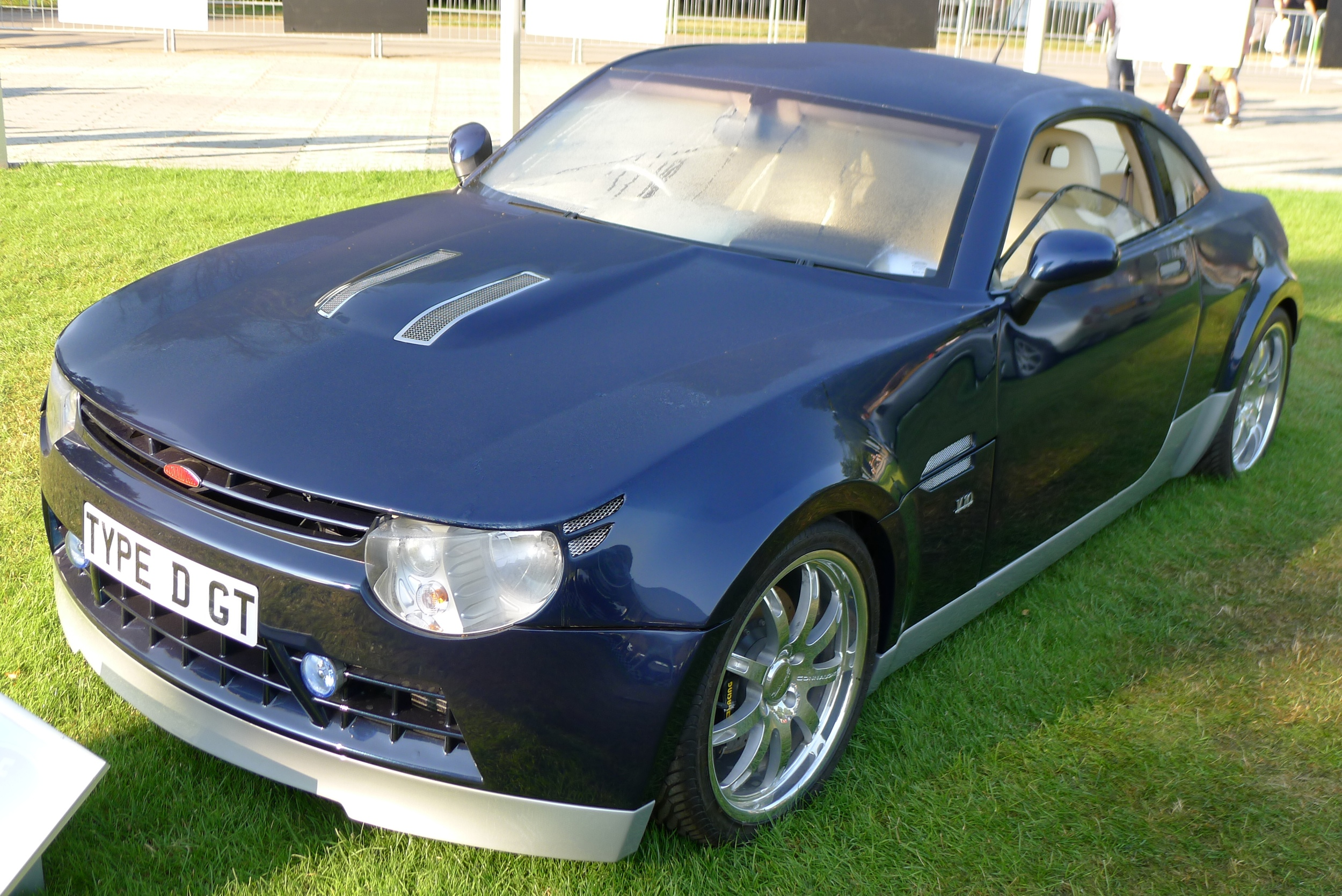
A Connaught Type D Syracuse

== Complete Drivers' World Championship results ==
(key)

Year	Chassis	Engine	Driver	Entrant	1	2	3	4	5	6	7	8	9	10	11	WCC	Points
1952					SUI	500	BEL	FRA	GBR	GER	NED	ITA				-*	-*
1952	Connaught Type A	Lea-Francis Straight-4	Ken Downing	Ken Downing							Ret					-*	-*
1952	Connaught Type A	Lea-Francis Straight-4	Ken Downing	Connaught Engineering					9							-*	-*
1952	Connaught Type A	Lea-Francis Straight-4	Eric Thompson	Connaught Engineering					5							-*	-*
1952	Connaught Type A	Lea-Francis Straight-4	Kenneth McAlpine	Connaught Engineering					16			Ret				-*	-*
1952	Connaught Type A	Lea-Francis Straight-4	Stirling Moss	Connaught Engineering								Ret				-*	-*
1952	Connaught Type A	Lea-Francis Straight-4	Dennis Poore	Connaught Engineering					4							-*	-*
1952	Connaught Type A	Lea-Francis Straight-4	Dennis Poore	Connaught Racing Syndicate								12				-*	-*
1953					ARG	500	NED	BEL	FRA	GBR	GER	SUI	ITA			-*	-*
1953	Connaught Type A	Lea-Francis Straight-4	Kenneth McAlpine	Connaught Engineering			Ret			Ret	13		NC			-*	-*
1953	Connaught Type A	Lea-Francis Straight-4	Stirling Moss	Connaught Engineering			9									-*	-*
1953	Connaught Type A	Lea-Francis Straight-4	Roy Salvadori	Connaught Engineering			Ret		Ret	Ret	Ret		Ret			-*	-*
1953	Connaught Type A	Lea-Francis Straight-4	Prince Bira	Connaught Engineering					Ret	7	Ret					-*	-*
1953	Connaught Type A	Lea-Francis Straight-4	Jack Fairman	Connaught Engineering									NC			-*	-*
1953	Connaught Type A	Lea-Francis Straight-4	Johnny Claes	Ecurie Belge			Ret		12		Ret		Ret			-*	-*
1953	Connaught Type A	Lea-Francis Straight-4	André Pilette	Ecurie Belge				NC								-*	-*
1953	Connaught Type A	Lea-Francis Straight-4	Ian Stewart	Ecurie Ecosse						Ret						-*	-*
1953	Connaught Type A	Lea-Francis Straight-4	Tony Rolt	Rob Walker Racing Team						Ret						-*	-*
1954					ARG	500	BEL	FRA	GBR	GER	SUI	ITA	ESP			-*	-*
1954	Connaught Type A	Lea-Francis Straight-4	Leslie Marr						13							-*	-*
1954	Connaught Type A	Lea-Francis Straight-4	Bill Whitehouse						Ret							-*	-*
1954	Connaught Type A	Lea-Francis Straight-4	Don Beauman	Sir Jeremy Boles					11							-*	-*
1954	Connaught Type A	Lea-Francis Straight-4	Leslie Thorne	Ecurie Ecosse					14							-*	-*
1954	Connaught Type A	Lea-Francis Straight-4	John Riseley-Prichard	Rob Walker Racing Team					Ret							-*	-*
1955					ARG	MON	500	BEL	NED	GBR	ITA					-*	-*
1955	Connaught Type B	Alta Straight-4	Kenneth McAlpine	Connaught Engineering						Ret						-*	-*
1955	Connaught Type B	Alta Straight-4	Jack Fairman	Connaught Engineering						DNS						-*	-*
1955	Connaught Type B	Alta Straight-4	Tony Rolt	Connaught Engineering						Ret^{±}						-*	-*
1955	Connaught Type B	Alta Straight-4	Peter Walker	Connaught Engineering						Ret^{±}						-*	-*
1955	Connaught Type B	Alta Straight-4	Leslie Marr							Ret						-*	-*
1956					ARG	MON	500	BEL	FRA	GBR	GER	ITA				-*	-*
1956	Connaught Type B	Alta Straight-4	Archie Scott Brown	Connaught Engineering						Ret						-*	-*
1956	Connaught Type B	Alta Straight-4	Desmond Titterington	Connaught Engineering						Ret						-*	-*
1956	Connaught Type B	Alta Straight-4	Jack Fairman	Connaught Engineering						4		5				-*	-*
1956	Connaught Type B	Alta Straight-4	Ron Flockhart	Connaught Engineering								3				-*	-*
1956	Connaught Type B	Alta Straight-4	Les Leston	Connaught Engineering								Ret				-*	-*
1956	Connaught Type B	Alta Straight-4	Piero Scotti					Ret								-*	-*
1957					ARG	MON	500	FRA	GBR	GER	PSC	ITA				-*	-*
1957	Connaught Type B	Alta Straight-4	Stuart Lewis-Evans	Connaught Engineering		4										-*	-*
1957	Connaught Type B	Alta Straight-4	Ivor Bueb	Connaught Engineering		Ret										-*	-*
1958					ARG	MON	NED	500	BEL	FRA	GBR	GER	POR	ITA	MOR	NC	0
1958	Connaught Type B	Alta Straight-4	Ivor Bueb	Bernie Ecclestone							Ret					NC	0
1958	Connaught Type B	Alta Straight-4	Bruce Kessler	Bernie Ecclestone		DNQ										NC	0
1958	Connaught Type B	Alta Straight-4	Paul Emery	Bernie Ecclestone		DNQ										NC	0
1958	Connaught Type B	Alta Straight-4	Jack Fairman	Bernie Ecclestone							Ret					NC	0
1958	Connaught Type B	Alta Straight-4	Bernie Ecclestone	Bernie Ecclestone		DNQ					DNP					NC	0
1959					MON	500	NED	FRA	GBR	GER	POR	ITA	USA			NC	0
1959	Connaught Type C	Alta Straight-4	Bob Said	Connaught Cars / Paul Emery									Ret			NC	0

*Constructors points not awarded until 1958
± = Indicates a shared drive

== See also ==
- Connaught Type D
- List of car manufacturers of the United Kingdom
