= Lea-Francis =

English vehicle manufacturer, 1895–2019

Lea & Francis Limited 1904-1935 Lea-Francis Cars Limited 1937-1960 A.B.Price Limited (Lea Francis Cars Limited) 1980-1990s
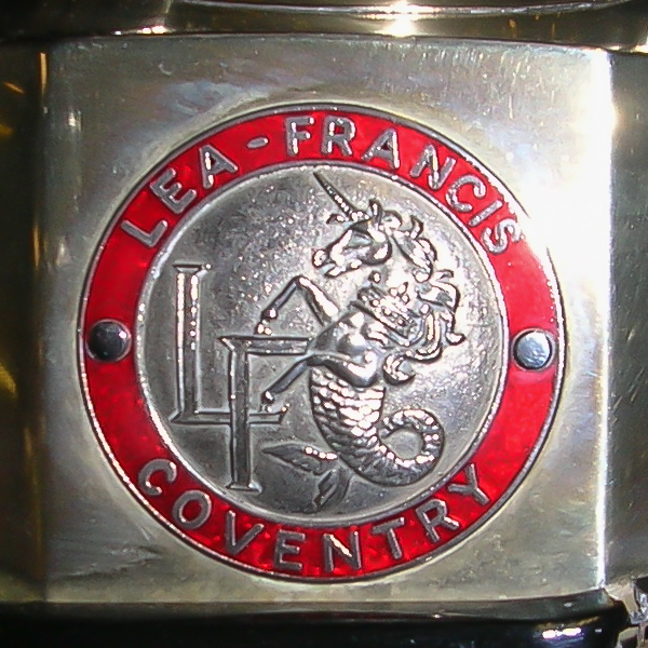
- Founded: 1895; 131 years ago in Coventry, Warwickshire, England
- Headquarters: Coventry later Studley, Warwickshire, England
- Key people: Richard Henry Lea and Graham Francis
- Products: Bicycles, cars and motorcycles

Lea-Francis was a British motor manufacturing company that began by building bicycles.

== History ==
R. H. (Richard Henry) Lea and G. I. (Graham Inglesby) Francis started the business, building bicycles in Coventry, in 1895. They branched out into car manufacturing in 1903 and motorcycles in 1911. in 1905 Lea-Francis built cars under licence for the Singer company. In 1919, they began building their own cars from bought-in components.

From 1922, Lea-Francis formed a business relationship with Vulcan of Southport, sharing manufacturing and dealers. Vulcan supplied bodies to Lea-Francis and, in return, received gearboxes and steering gear. Two six-cylinder Vulcan-designed and manufactured cars were marketed as Lea-Francis 14/40 and 16/60, as well as Vulcans. The association ended in 1928 when Vulcan stopped making cars.

A sporting image began to appear from about 1925, leading to models such as the Hyper and the Ace of Spades. The Hyper, also called the S-type, was the first British supercharged production car with a 1.5 litre Meadows engine, and in 1928 a Lea-Francis Hyper won the Ulster TT, a 30-lap race on the 13.5-mile (21.7 km) Ards circuit on the roads of Northern Ireland driven by race car driver Kaye Don. The race was watched by a record 250,000 spectators, and the victory placed Lea-Francis firmly on the map.

The company was re-formed in 1937 under the chairmanship of George Leek with other ex-Riley Motor men such as R.H. Rose who designed a new engine for Lea-Francis having a similar layout to the Riley 12/4. The 12 hp and the 14 hp (actually 12.9 hp) were introduced in 1937 and continued until the start of the war in 1939 when production ceased and the factory concentrated on manufacturing for the war effort.

Post-war car production commenced in 1946 with updated vehicles based on the pre-war designs. The 14 hp Saloon and Sports were luxurious and sporty vehicles and were popular, if expensive. Eventually, an improved chassis with independent front suspension and hydraulic brakes was introduced across the range and in 1950 the 18 h.p. saloon and 2½ litre Sports, both with the more powerful 2.5 litre engine, were introduced. Production once again came to a halt in 1954 after only 85 2.5 Litre Sports had been built. The company had not been present at the Earl's Court motor show since 1952.

A number of 14 hp Sports chassis were sold to Connaught Engineering where they became the L2 and L3 sports-racing cars. Connaught developed a Formula 2 racing engine for their "A" type single seater which was based on the Lea-Francis design.

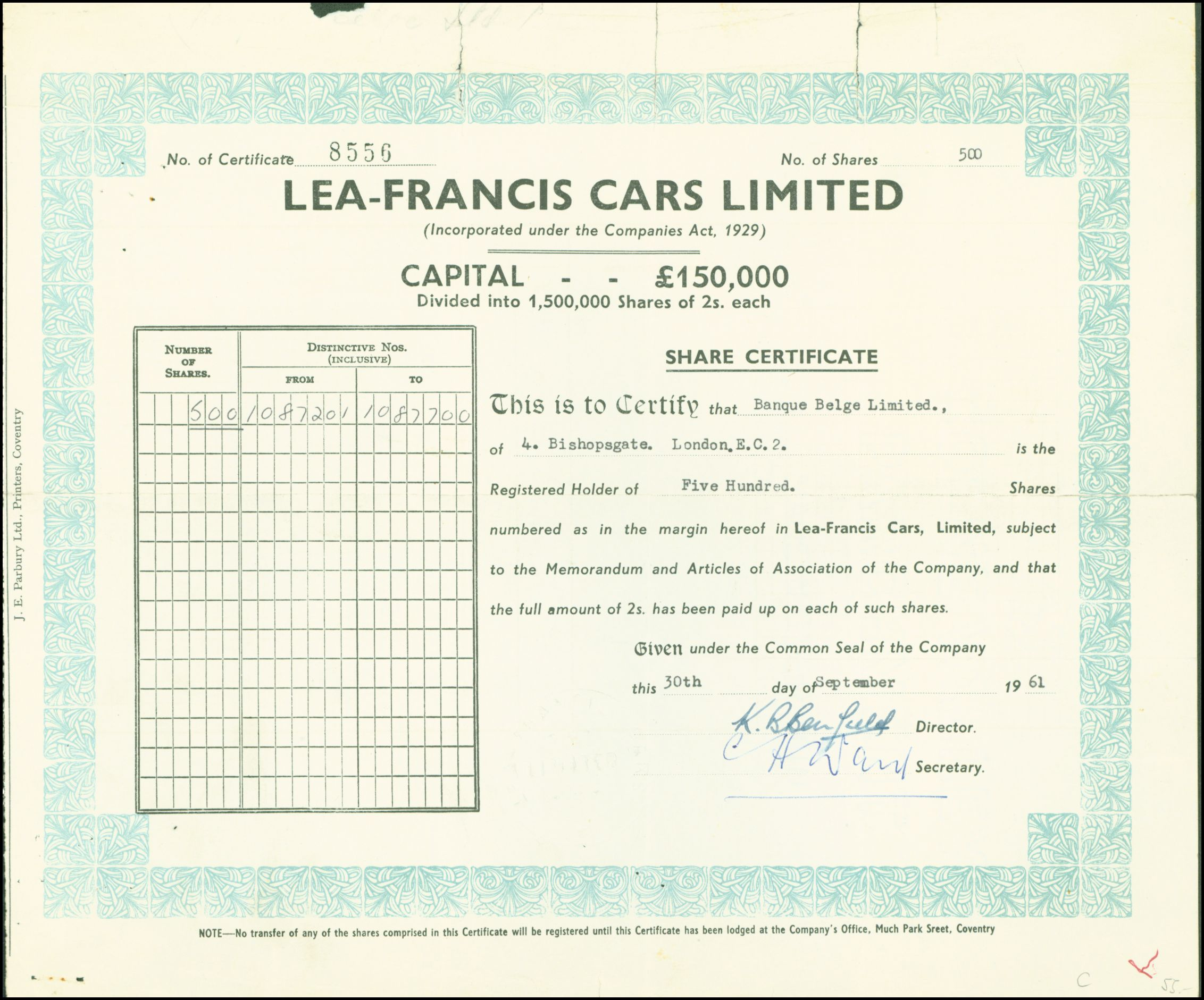
Share of the Lea-Francis Cars Ltd., issued 30. September 1961

The company had a chequered history with some notable motorcycles and cars, but financial difficulties surfaced on a regular basis. The Hillfields site was abandoned in 1937 when it was sold by the receiver and a new company, under a slightly different name, moved to Much Park Street in Coventry. It survived there until 1962 when the company finally closed.

The Lynx, a tube-framed 2+2 roadster with a Ford Zephyr 2.6 litre inline-six engine, was the final model produced by Lea-Francis. Unveiled at the October 1960 British Motor show, it was painted in mauve with gold trim. The model remained in prototype form and only 3 Lynx cars were made due to lack of demand.

A total of almost 10,000 Lea-Francis vehicles were made until production ceased due to the Lynx's failure to capture the buying public's attention. By the time of the Lynx's launch, Lea-Francis was so financially distressed that they could not afford to build Lynxes unless they had been pre-ordered, and as none were, only three prototypes were made. Lea-Francis also dallied into starting production of the Fuldamobil Nobel bubble car to keep busy but it proved a frivolous plan and had competition from the famous Mini that was introduced in the late 1950s. More serious work was undertaken when a new prototype was built for a possible brand new saloon using a Chrysler V8 engine but the project remained unfinished. The motor manufacturing parts of the company passed into the hands of the receiver in 1962, leaving Lea-Francis to continue with their engineering business. The company's material assets were purchased by Quinton Hazell Ltd., a motor vehicle component manufacturer, while the Lea-Francis name was purchased by English entrepreneur Barrie Price at about the same time.

In 1976 Barrie Price began work on a hand made new car which was to be an expensive Lea-Francis 'Nostalgia-type' tourer powered by Jaguar running gear, recalling the same cars Lea-Francis was known for in the 1930s. Price's firm, A.B.PRICE LIMITED, continued to provide service and spares for the surviving cars from 1980 and also built a number of retro Lea-Francis modern motor cars to special order, reviving the "Ace of Spades" name to use for their unique hand built model. These had an glassfibre body shell and an aluminium frame and included a number of U.K.-made components, being produced as a two-seat coupé and a convertible. Both versions were powered by Jaguar Cars mechanicals and were planned to be produced at an average of 12-14 cars annually with a price tag at £20,000 according to motorbook author and writer G.N. Georgano. A.B. Price sold Lea-Francis Ltd. and all its assets in July 2019.

== Lea-Francis car models ==
| Model Name | Engine | Year | Production |
|---|---|---|---|
| 15 | 3,500 cc 3-cylinder | 1905–06 | 3 |
| 13.9 | 2,297 cc inline-4 | 1920 | |
| 11.9 | 1,944 cc inline-4 | 1920–22 | |
| Nine (Type C) | 1,075 cc inline-4 | 1920–23 | 90 |
| 10 and 12 (Types D to O) | 1,247 or 1,496 cc inline-4 | 1923–30 | 2350 |
| 12 (Types P to W) | 1,496 cc inline-4 | 1927–35 | 1700 |
| 14/40 (and Type T) | 1,696 cc inline-6 | 1927–29 | 350 |
| 16/60 | 1,990 cc inline-6 | 1928–29 | 67 |
| Hyper 1.5 Litre Supercharged (Type S) | 1,496 cc inline-4 | 1928–31 | 185 |
| 2 Litre Ace of Spades | 1,991/2,244 cc inline-6 | 1930–36 | 67 |
| 12 and 14 | 1,496/1,629 cc inline-4 | 1938–40 | 83 |
| 12 | 1,496 cc inline-4 | 1946–47 | 13 |
| 14 | 1,767 cc inline-4 | 1946–54 | 2133 |
| 14 estate | 1,767 cc inline-4 | 1946–53 | 916 |
| 14 Sport | 1,767 cc inline-4 | 1947–49 | 118 |
| 14/70 | 1,767 cc inline-4 | 1948–51 | 162 |
| 18 | 2,496 cc inline-4 | 1949–54 | 69 |
| 2½ Litre | 2,496 cc inline-4 | 1949–53 | 89 |
| Lynx | 2,553 cc inline-6 | 1960 | 3 |
| Ace of Spades | 3442 inline-6 4196 inline-6 | 1980–92 | 4 |

== Lea-Francis Owners' Club ==
The Lea-Francis Owners' Club has a growing membership of approximately 340 members who own around 420 vehicles.

== Revival ==
In 1998 it was believed that the Lea-Francis name might yet be seen again on the road when a new Lea-Francis sports car by the name of the 30/230, designed by James Randle, was shown at the Motor Show. Only a prototype was built before the project had to be abandoned.

== Gallery ==
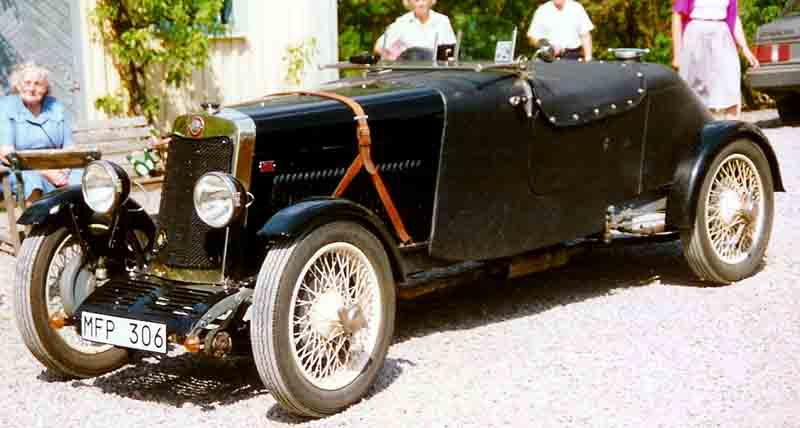
1928 Hyper

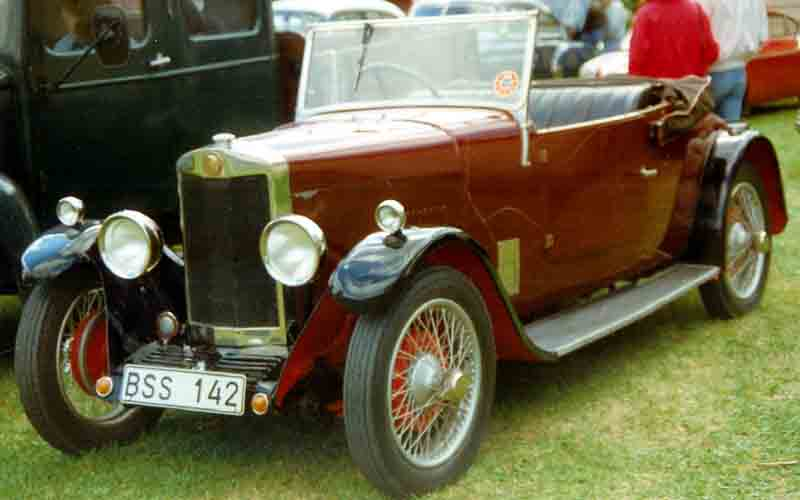
1929 11.9 P Type

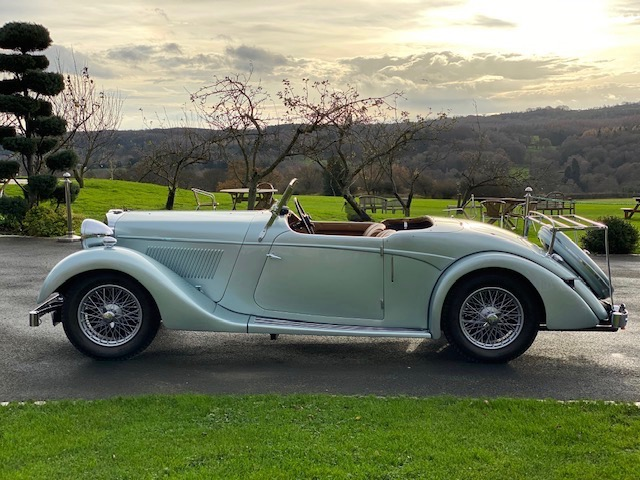
1939 Corsica Super Sports 14hp Roadster

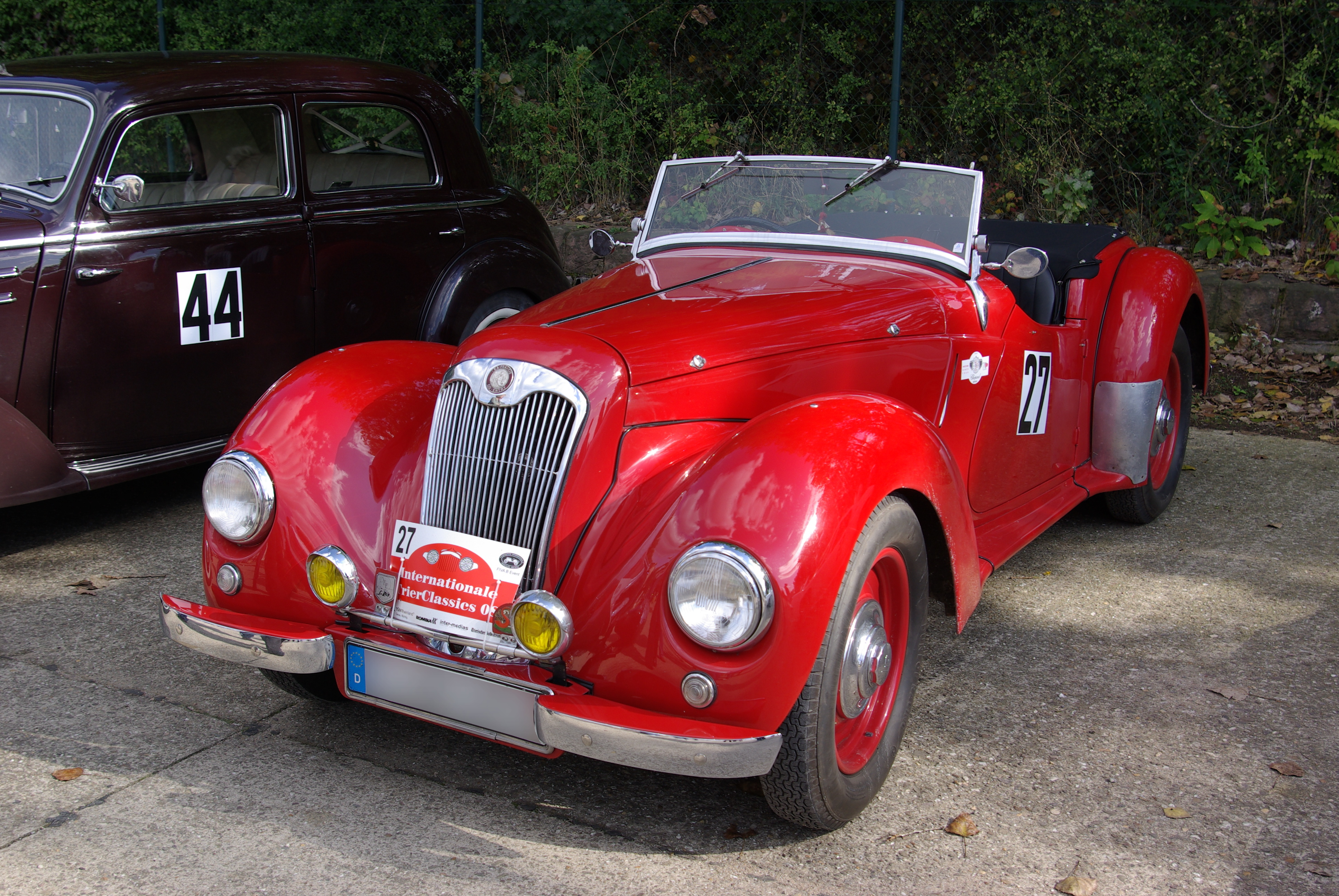
1949 14 Sports

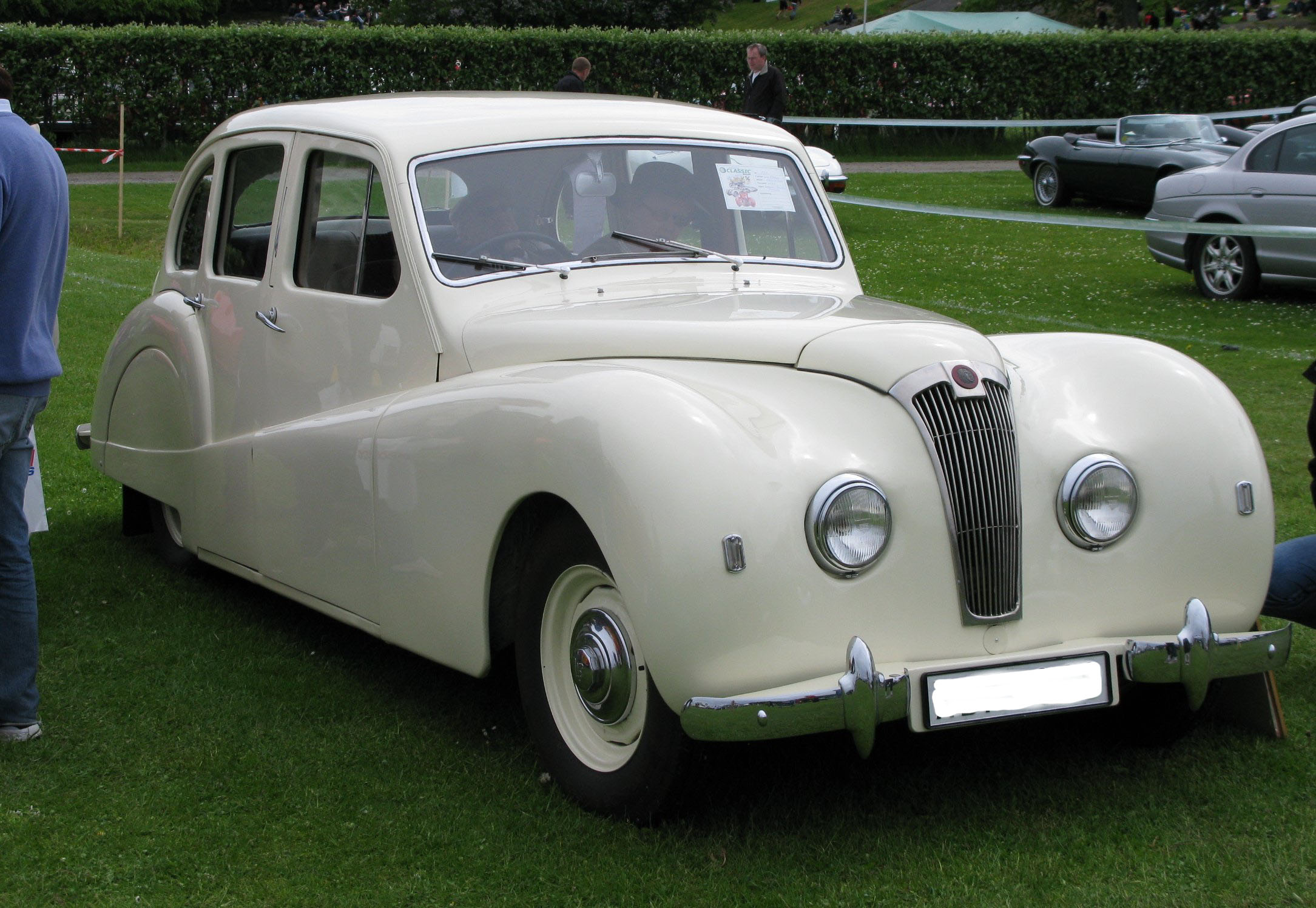
1949 14/70 six-light saloon

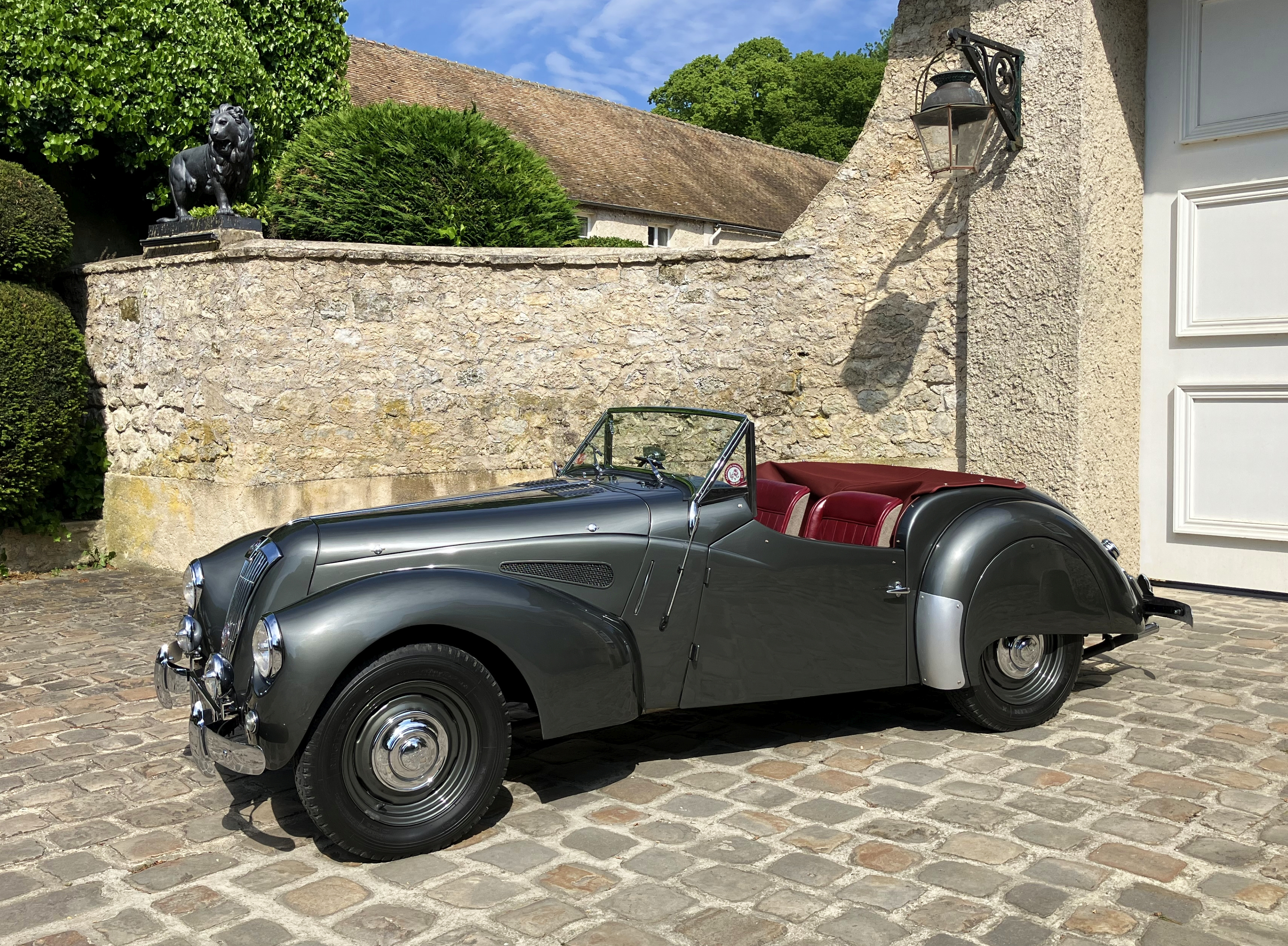
1950 2.5 Sports

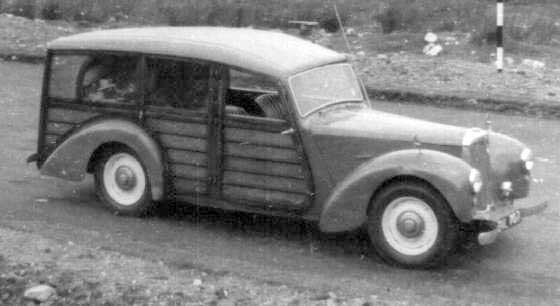
1951 14 Estate

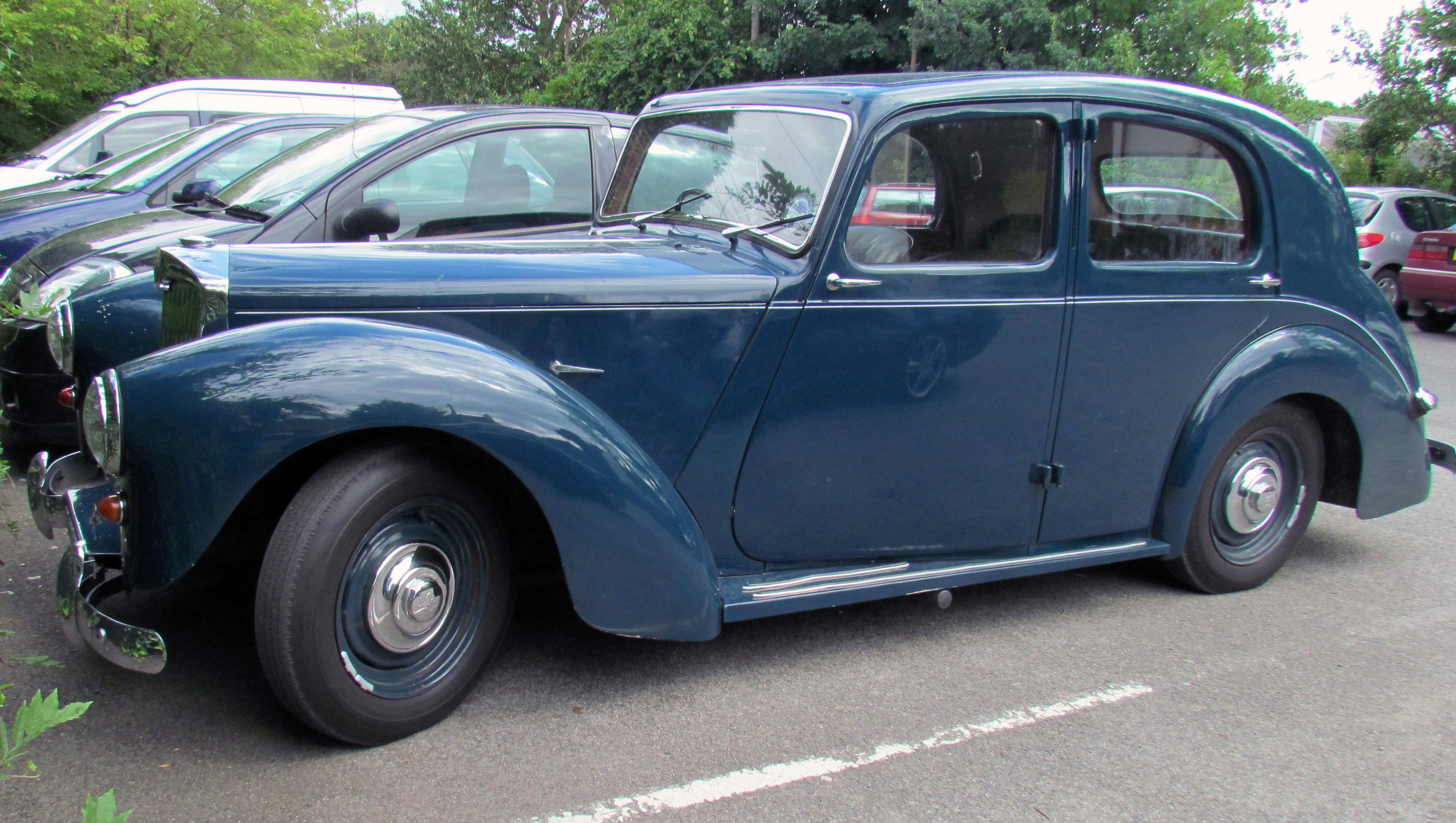
1954 14 hp 4-door 4-light Saloon

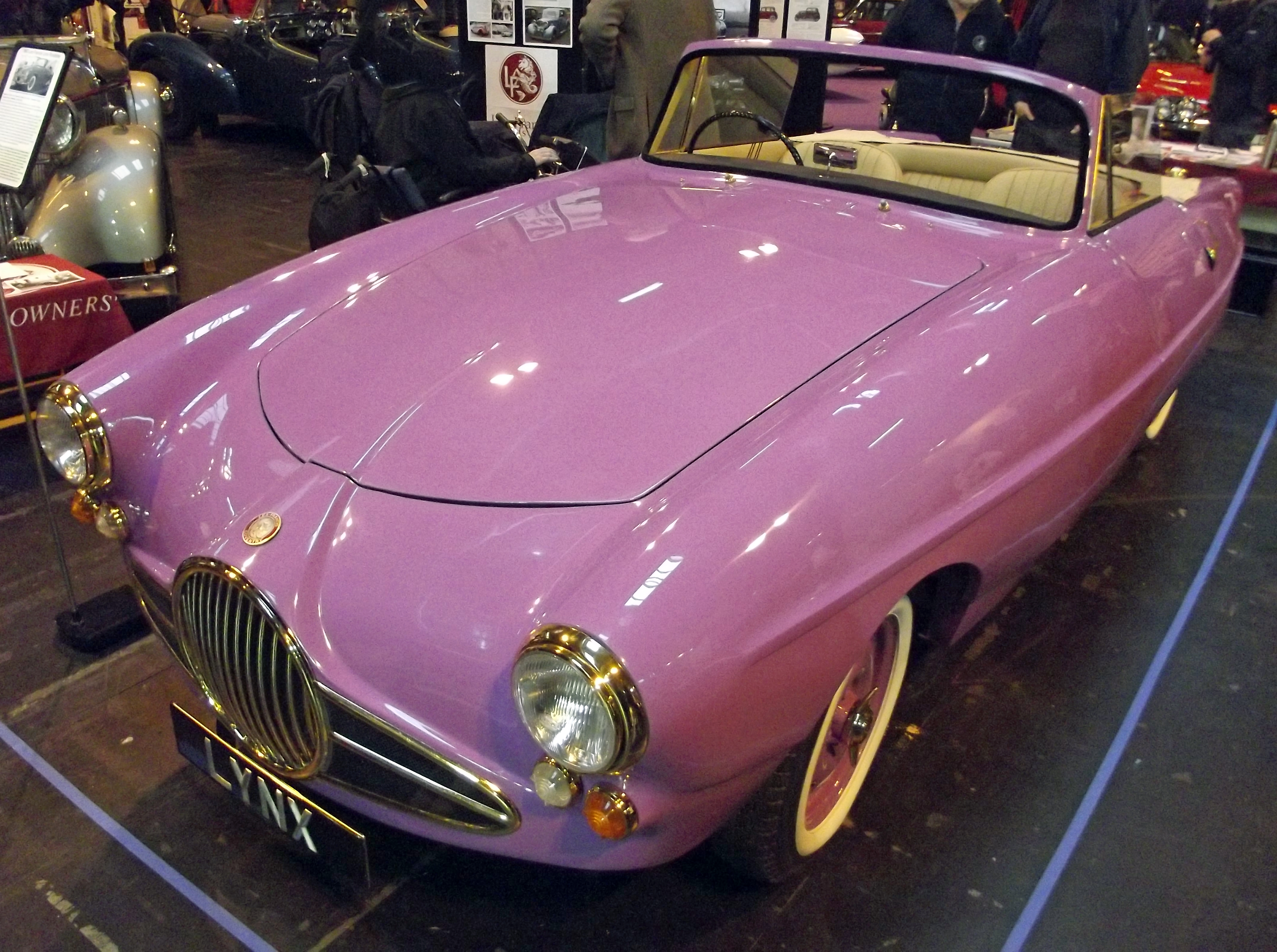
1960 Lynx

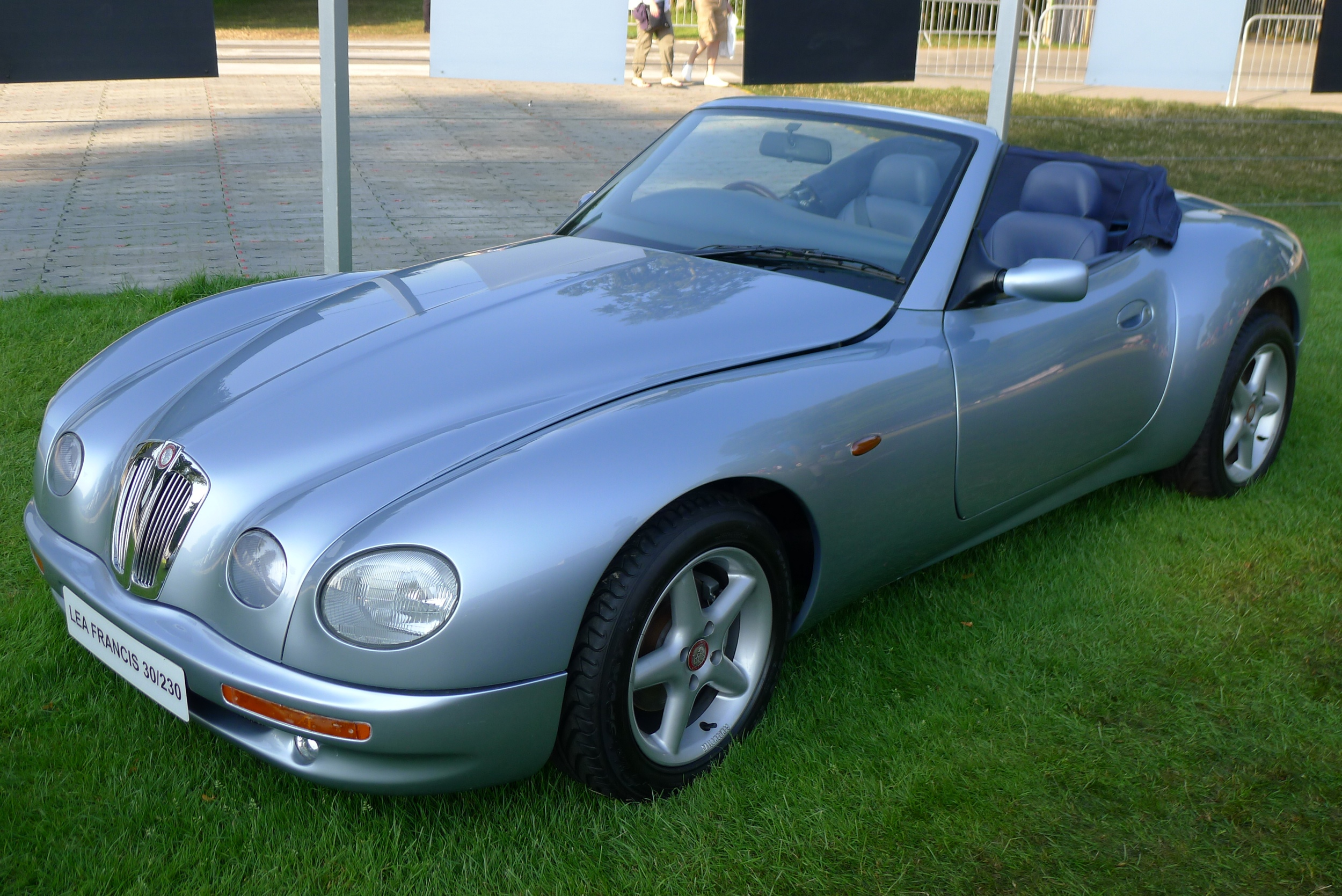
The 1998 30/230 prototype
