= 1953 Grand Prix des Frontières =

1953 Frontières Grand Prix
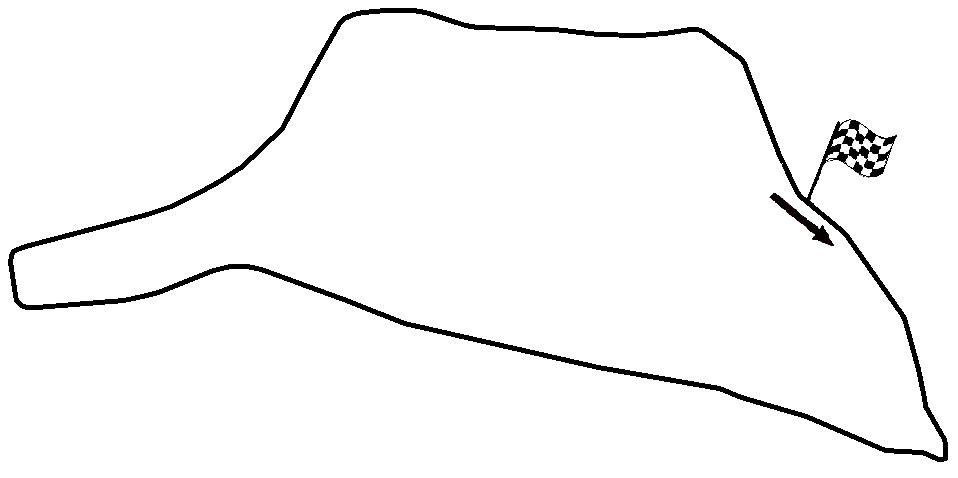

Race details
- Date: 24 May 1953
- Official name: XXIII Grand Prix des Frontières
- Location: Chimay, Belgium
- Course: Temporary street circuit
- Course length: 10.827 km (6.728 mi)
- Distance: 20 laps, 216.537 km (134.550 mi)

Pole position
Driver	(France) Maurice Trintignant	Gordini
- Time: 4:11

Fastest lap
Driver	(France) Maurice Trintignant	Gordini
- Time: 4:11

Podium
First	(France) Maurice Trintignant	Gordini
Second	(Belgium) Roger Laurent	Ferrari
Third	(United States) Fred Wacker	Gordini

The 23nd Grand Prix des Frontières was a non-championship Formula Two motor race held on 24 May 1953 at the Chimay Street Circuit in Chimay, Belgium. The Grand Prix was won by Maurice Trintignant in a Gordini Type 16. Roger Laurent finished second in a Ferrari 500 and Fred Wacker was third in another Gordini Type 16.

== Classification ==
=== Race ===
Pos	No	Driver	Entrant	Car	Time/Retired	Grid
1	2	(France) Maurice Trintignant	Equipe Gordini	Gordini Type 16	1:25:59.5, 151.39 kph	1
2	34	(Belgium) Roger Laurent	Ecurie Francorchamps	Ferrari 500	+1:11.5	4
3	4	(United States) Fred Wacker	Equipe Gordini	Gordini Type 16	+2:27.9	6
4	8	(Germany) Hans Stuck	Hans Stuck	AFM-Küchen	+1 lap	5
5	26	(Belgium) Georges Berger	Mme de Walckiers	Simca Gordini Type 15	+2 laps	8
6	32	(Belgium) Johnny Claes	Ecurie Belge	Connaught Type A-Lea Francis	+3 laps, accident	2
7	38	(Belgium) Roger Meunier	Roger Meunier	Jicey-BMW 328	+3 laps	
8	12	(France) Paul Delebarre	Paul Delebarre	Delebarre Special-BMW 328	+3 laps	
9	22	(United Kingdom) Arthur Legat	Arthur Legat	Veritas Meteor	+4 laps, mechanical	
10	10	(Germany) Ludwig Fischer	Ludwig Fischer	AFM-BMW 328	+4 laps	
Ret	36	(France) Henri Oreiller	Ecurie Belge	Veritas RS-BMW 328	14 laps, accident and fire	
Ret	30	(Belgium) Marcel Masuy	Marcel Masuy	Veritas RS-BMW 328	13 laps, mechanical	
Ret	16	(France) Serge Nersessian	Serge Nersessian	Balsa Special-BMW 328	9 laps, mechanical	
Ret	23	(Germany) Willi Heeks	Willi Heeks	Veritas Meteor	5 laps, mechanical	
Ret	1	(Thailand) B. Bira	Prince Birabongse	Maserati A6GCM	3 laps, crash	3
Ret	24	(Germany) Kurt Adolff	Ernst Loof	Veritas Meteor	2 laps, mechanical	
Ret	28	(Belgium) Camille Chard'Homme	Camille Chard'Homme	BMW Special-BMW 328	2 laps, mechanical	
Ret	14	(France) Georges Mulnard	Georges Mulnard	Monnier Speciale-BMW 328	0 laps, gearbox	
Ret	6	(France) Jacques Pollet	Equipe AGS	Simca Gordini Type 15	0 laps, crankshaft	7
Ret	18	(United Kingdom) Rodney Nuckey	Rodney Nuckey	Cooper T23-Bristol	0 laps, mechanical	
DNA	20	(United Kingdom) John Lyons	William Knight	Connaught Type A-Lea Francis		
DNA	40	(United Kingdom) Bill Aston	Bill Aston	Aston Butterworth		
DNA	42	(Belgium) André Pilette	Equipe Gordini	Gordini Type 16		
DNA	44	(Belgium) Jacques Swaters	Ecurie Francorchamps	Cooper T23-Bristol		
DNA	24	(Germany) Ernst Loof	Ernst Loof	Veritas Meteor	car driven by Adolff	

Previous race: 1953 Winfield JC Formula 2 Race	Formula One non-championship races 1953 season	Next race: 1953 Coronation Trophy
Previous race: 1952 Grand Prix des Frontières	Grand Prix des Frontières	Next race: 1954 Grand Prix des Frontières
