= 1952 Avusrennen =

Race details
- Date: 28 September 1952
- Official name: VIII Internationales AvD Avusrennen
- Location: AVUS, Berlin
- Course: Temporary road circuit
- Course length: 8.400 km (5.220 mi)
- Distance: 25 laps, 210.00 km (130.49 mi)

Fastest lap
Driver	(Switzerland) Rudi Fischer	Ferrari
- Time: 2:36.5

Podium
First	(Switzerland) Rudi Fischer	Ferrari
Second	(Germany) Hans Klenk	Veritas
Third	(Germany) Fritz Riess	Veritas

The 8th Internationales AdV Avusrennen was a Formula Two motor race held on 28 September 1952 at the AVUS circuit. The race was run over 25 laps of the circuit and was won by Swiss driver Rudi Fischer in a Ferrari 500. Fischer also set fastest lap. Hans Klenk finished second and Fritz Riess was third.

== Results ==
Pos	No.	Driver	Entrant	Constructor	Time/Position
1	2	(Switzerland) Rudi Fischer	Ecurie Espadon	Ferrari 500	1:06:43.8, 186.20 kph
2	128	(Germany) Hans Klenk	Hans Klenk	Veritas Meteor	+1 lap
3		(Germany) Fritz Riess	Fritz Riess	Veritas RS-BMW 328	+1 lap
4	6	(France) Armand Philippe	Ecurie Rosier	Ferrari 166	+1 lap
5	4	(Germany) Hans Stuck	Ecurie Espadon	Ferrari 212	+2 laps
6		(Germany) Willi Heeks	Willi Heeks	AFM-BMW 328	+2 laps
7		(Germany) Ernst Klodwig	Ernst Klodwig	Eigenbau-BMW 328	+2 laps
8	121	(Germany) Rudolf Krause	Rudolf Krause	Greifzu-BMW 328	+3 laps
9		(Uruguay) Eitel Cantoni	Escuderia Bandeirantes	Maserati A6GCM	+3 laps
10		(United States) Alexander Orley	Alexander Orley	Orley Special-BMW 328	+9 laps
Ret.	10	(Italy) Puni Vignolo	Scuderia Marzotto	Ferrari 166	14 laps
Ret.		(France) Jacques Pollet	Jacques Pollet	Simca Gordini Type 15	14 laps
Ret.		(Germany) Theo Helfrich	Theo Helfrich	Veritas RS	14 laps
Ret.		(Italy) Gianfranco Comotti	Escuderia Bandeirantes	Maserati A6GCM	2 laps
Ret.		(Germany) "Bernard Nacke"	Günther Bechem	Holbein-BMW 328	2 laps
Ret.		(Germany) Toni Ulmen	Toni Ulmen	Veritas RS	1 lap
Ret.	8	(Italy) Guido Mancini	Scuderia Marzotto	Ferrari 166	1 lap
Ret.		(Germany) Josef Peters	Josef Peters	Veritas RS	0 laps
DNS	127	(Germany) Paul Pietsch	Paul Pietsch	Veritas Meteor	accident

Previous race: 1952 Madgwick Cup	Formula One non-championship races 1952 season	Next race: 1952 Joe Fry Memorial Trophy
Previous race: 1951 Avusrennen	Avusrennen	Next race: 1953 Avusrennen
