= 1953 Avusrennen =

Race details
- Date: 12 July 1953
- Official name: IX Internationales AvD Avusrennen
- Location: AVUS, Berlin
- Course: Temporary road circuit
- Course length: 8.300 km (5.157 mi)
- Distance: 25 laps, 207.50 km (128.93 mi)

Pole position
Driver	(Belgium) Jacques Swaters	Ferrari

Fastest lap
Driver	(Germany) Theo Helfrich	Veritas
- Time: 2:31.9

Podium
First	(Belgium) Jacques Swaters	Ferrari
Second	(Germany) Hans Klenk	Veritas
Third	(Germany) Theo Helfrich	Veritas

The 9th Internationales AdV Avusrennen was a Formula Two motor race held on 12 July 1953 at the AVUS circuit. The race was run over 25 laps of the circuit, and was won by Belgian driver Jacques Swaters in a Ferrari 500. Hans Klenk in a Veritas Meteor finished second and Theo Helfrich in another Veritas was third and set fastest lap.

== Results ==
Pos	No.	Driver	Entrant	Constructor	Time/Position
1	18	(Belgium) Jacques Swaters	Ecurie Francorchamps	Ferrari 500	1:05:03.3, 189.27 kph
2	30	(Germany) Hans Klenk	Hans Klenk	Veritas Meteor	+2:42.5
3	24	(Germany) Theo Helfrich	Theo Helfrich	Veritas RS-BMW 328	+2:55.9
4	21	(Germany) Hans Herrmann	Hans Herrmann	Veritas RS-BMW 328	+1 lap
5	16	(United Kingdom) Rodney Nuckey	Rodney Nuckey	Cooper T23-Bristol	+1 lap
6	10	(Belgium) Johnny Claes	Ecurie Belge	Connaught Type A-Lea Francis	+1 lap
7	31	(Germany) Ernst Klodwig	Ernst Klodwig	Eigenbau-BMW 328	+1 lap
NC	29	(Germany) Ernst Lautenschlager	Ernst Lautenschlager	Krakau Special-BMW 328	+4 laps
NC	15	(France) Maurice Monnier	Maurice Monnier	Monnier Special-BMW 328	+4 laps
Ret.	34	(Germany) Kurt Adolff	Ecurie Espadon	Ferrari 500	20 laps, accident
Ret.	26	(Germany) Oswald Karch	Oswald Karch	Veritas RS-BMW 328	18 laps
Ret.	17	(Thailand) B. Bira	Prince Birabongse	Maserati A6GCM	15 laps
Ret.	23	(Germany) Willi Heeks	Willi Heeks	Veritas Meteor	10 laps
Ret.	32	(Germany) Karl-Günther Bechem	Karl-Günther Bechem	AFM-BMW 328	8 laps
Ret.	20	(Italy) Giovanni de Riu	Giovanni de Riu	Maserati 4CLT/48	5 laps
Ret.	11	(United Kingdom) Alan Brown	Equipe Anglaise	Cooper T23-Bristol	2 laps, accident
Ret.	22	(Germany) Wolfgang Seidel	Wolfgang Seidel	Veritas RS-BMW 328	2 laps
Ret.	35	(Germany) Edgar Barth	EMW Rennkollektiv	EMW-BMW 328	1 lap, clutch
Ret.	37	(Germany) Kurt Straubel	Kurt Straubel	Eigenbau BMW-BMW 328	0 laps
Ret.	38	(Germany) Heinz Melkus	Heinz Melkus	Veritas RS-Alfa Romeo	0 laps
Ret.	40	(Germany) Arthur Rosenhammer	EMW Rennkollektiv	EMW-BMW 328	0 laps
Ret.	14	(France) Paul Delebarre	Paul Delebarre	Delebarre Simca Speciale-BMW 328	0 laps
Ret.	33	(Germany) Adolf Lang	Adolf Lang	Veritas RS-BMW 328	0 laps
Ret.	36	(Germany) Rudolf Krause	Dora Greifzu	Greifzu-BMW 328	0 laps

Previous race: 1953 Crystal Palace Trophy	Formula One non-championship races 1953 season	Next race: 1953 United States Air Force Trophy
Previous race: 1952 Avusrennen	Avusrennen	Next race: 1954 Avusrennen
