= 1952 Eifelrennen =

- Non-championship race in the 1952 Formula One season

Race details
- Date: 25 May 1952
- Official name: XVI Internationales ADAC Eifelrennen
- Location: Nürburgring, Nürburg, Rhineland-Palatinate
- Course: Permanent racing facility
- Course length: 22.799 km (14.167 mi)
- Distance: 7 laps, 159.594 km (99.167 mi)

Pole position
Driver	(Switzerland) Rudi Fischer	Ferrari
- Time: 11:02.0

Fastest lap
Driver	(Switzerland) Rudi Fischer	Ferrari
- Time: 10:51.0

Podium
First	(Switzerland) Rudi Fischer	Ferrari
Second	(United Kingdom) Stirling Moss	HWM-Alta
Third	(United Kingdom) Ken Wharton	Frazer Nash

The 16th Internationales ADAC-Eifelrennen was a motor race, run to Formula Two rules, held on 25 May 1952 at the Nürburgring circuit. The race was run over 7 laps of the circuit, and was won by Swiss driver Rudi Fischer in a Ferrari 500. Fischer also set pole and fastest lap. Stirling Moss finished second and Ken Wharton was third.

== Results ==
Pos	No.	Driver	Entrant	Constructor	Time/Position	Grid
1	130	(Switzerland) Rudi Fischer	Ecurie Espadon	Ferrari 500	1:16:58.3, 124.33 kph	1
2	139	(United Kingdom) Stirling Moss	HW Motors Ltd.	HWM-Alta	+41.2s	2
3	138	(United Kingdom) Ken Wharton	Scuderia Franera	Frazer Nash FN48	+2:21.0	4
4	140	(United Kingdom) Duncan Hamilton	HW Motors Ltd.	HWM-Alta	+2:44.2	3
5	125	(Germany) Toni Ulmen	Toni Ulmen	Veritas Meteor	+7:05.2	
Ret	131	(Germany) Fritz Riess	Ecurie Espadon	Ferrari 212	6 laps, accident	
Ret	132	(Germany) Willi Krakau	Renngemeinschaft Krakau-Riess	AFM-BMW	5 laps, engine	
Ret	123	(Germany) Willi Heeks	Willi Heeks	AFM-BMW	5 laps, lost wheel	
Ret	136	(Germany) Helmut Niedermayr	Helmut Niedermayr	Veritas RS-BMW	4 laps	
Ret.	134	(Germany) Heinz-Gerd Jäger	Heinz-Gerd Jäger	Veritas RS-BMW	4 laps	
Ret.	133	(Germany) Harry Merkel	Renngemeinschaft Krakau-Riess	BMW 328	4 laps	
Ret.	129	(Germany) Josef Peters	Josef Peters	Veritas RS-BMW	3 laps	
Ret.	128	(Germany) Hans Klenk	Hans Klenk	Veritas Meteor	3 laps	
Ret.	135	(Germany) Adolf Brudes	Alexander Orley	Orley Special-Veritas	3 laps, engine	
Ret.	127	(Germany) Paul Pietsch	Paul Pietsch	Veritas Meteor	1 lap, engine	
Ret.	124	(Germany) Zdenko von Schönborn	Scuderia Bavaria	Simca Gordini Type 11	1 lap, clutch	

Previous race: 1952 Naples Grand Prix	Formula One non-championship races 1952 season	Next race: 1952 Paris Grand Prix
Previous race: 1951 Eifelrennen	Eifelrennen	Next race: 1953 Eifelrennen
