= Klenk =

German motorsport team

- Base: West Germany
- Founder(s): Hans Klenk
- Noted drivers: (West Germany) Theo Helfrich

Formula One World Championship career
- First entry: 1954 German Grand Prix
- Races entered: 1
- Constructors' Championships: 0
- Drivers' Championships: 0
- Race victories: 0
- Podiums: 0
- Points: 0
- Pole positions: 0
- Fastest laps: 0

The Klenk-Meteor was a racing car which competed in the 1954 German Grand Prix. The car was based on the established German marque of Veritas which was active between 1948 and 1953. Veritas is chiefly remembered as a manufacturer of sports cars and successful Formula Two racing cars. The company closed when its founder, Ernst Loof, became ill. He subsequently died in 1956. The Klenk-Meteor entered for the 1954 German Grand Prix was essentially a Veritas Formula Two car from the previous year. The car was owned and prepared by the noted German racing driver Hans Klenk who intended to race it himself in the Grand Prix. However, Klenk's career as a racing driver came to an end when he suffered injuries in an accident while working as a test driver for Mercedes-Benz. The car was driven in the Grand Prix by another German, Theo Helfrich. He retired on lap 8 with engine failure.

== Complete Formula One World Championship results ==
(key)

Year	Chassis	Engine	Tyres	Drivers	1	2	3	4	5	6	7	8	9
1954	Klenk Meteor	BMW L6	P		ARG	500	BEL	FRA	GBR	GER	SUI	ITA	ESP
1954	Klenk Meteor	BMW L6	P	(West Germany) Theo Helfrich						Ret			
