= 1954 Grand Prix des Frontières =

1954 Frontières Grand Prix
- Non-championship race in the 1954 Formula One season
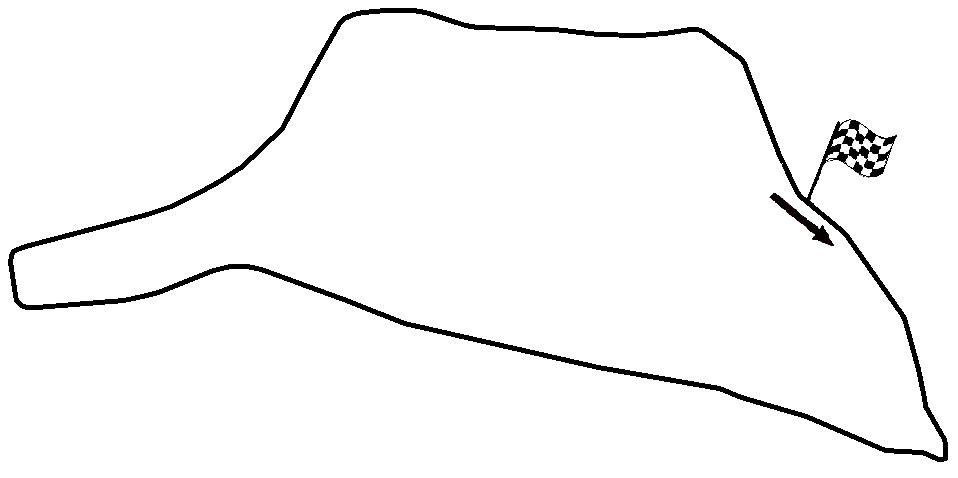

Race details
- Date: 6 June 1954
- Official name: XXIV Grand Prix des Frontières
- Location: Chimay, Belgium
- Course: Chimay Street Circuit
- Course length: 10.80 km (6.73 miles)
- Distance: 20 laps, 216.0 km (134.6 miles)

Pole position
Driver	(France) Jacques Pollet	Gordini
- Time: 3:55

Fastest lap
Driver	(France) Jacques Pollet	Gordini
- Time: 3:58

Podium
First	(Thailand) B. Bira	Maserati
Second	(Belgium) André Pilette	Gordini
Third	(United Kingdom) Don Beauman	Connaught

The 24th Grand Prix des Frontières was a non-championship Formula One motor race held on 6 June 1954 at the Chimay Street Circuit in Chimay, Belgium. The Grand Prix was won by B. Bira in a Maserati A6GCM. André Pilette finished second in a Gordini T16 and Don Beauman was third in a Connaught Type A-Lea Francis. Jacques Pollet took pole and fastest lap in another Gordini T16.

During the race Pollet crashed while avoiding the spinning Pilette and two spectators were killed.

== Classification ==
=== Race ===
Pos	No	Driver	Entrant	Car	Time/Retired	Grid
1	4	(Thailand) B. Bira	Prince Birabongse of Siam	Maserati A6GCM	1:22:15, 98.19mph	2
2	10	(Belgium) André Pilette	Equipe Gordini	Gordini T16	+35s	4
3	34	(United Kingdom) Don Beauman	Sir Jeremy Boles	Connaught Type A-Lea Francis	+1 lap	3
4	8	(France) Jacques Pollet	Equipe Gordini	Gordini T16	+2 laps, accident	1
NC	22	(Belgium) Arthur Legat	Arthur Legat	Veritas Meteor	+3 laps	5
Ret	30	(Belgium) Pierre Bastien	Pierre Bastien	Monnier Speciale-BMW 328	9 laps, oil pipe	7
Ret	32	(France) Paul Delabarre	Paul Delabarre	Simca 8		8
Ret	28	(France) Roger Gerbout	Roger Gerbout	RG Speciale-BMW 328		9
Ret	18	(Belgium) Roger Meunier	Roger Meunier	Jicey-BMW 328	0 laps, mechanical	6
DNS	36	(Belgium) Viglielmo Matozza	Viglielmo Matozza	VM Monoplace-Tatra	did not practice	-
DNS	12	(Belgium) Roger Laurent	Ecurie Francorchamps	Ferrari 500	engine	-
DNS	14	(Belgium) Jacques Swaters	Ecurie Francorchamps	Cooper T20-Bristol	camshaft	-
DNA	2	(United Kingdom) Lance Macklin	Hersham and Walton Motors	HWM-Alta	crash	-
DNA	16	(Belgium) Dekeerle	Dekeerle	Veritas RS		-
DNA	20	(Belgium) Marcel Masuy	Marcel Masuy	Veritas RS		-
DNA	24	(United Kingdom) Paul Emery	Emeryson Cars	Emeryson Mk.1-Alta	driver elsewhere	-
DNA	26	(Germany) Willy Sturzebecher	Willy Sturzebecher	Veritas Meteor		-

Previous race: 1954 Rome Grand Prix	Formula One non-championship races 1954 season	Next race: 1954 BARC Formula 1 Race
Previous race: 1953 Grand Prix des Frontières	Grand Prix des Frontières	Next race: 1955 Grand Prix des Frontières
