= 1953 Eifelrennen =

Race details
- Date: 31 May 1953
- Official name: XVII Internationales ADAC Eifelrennen
- Location: Nürburgring, Nürburg, Rhineland-Palatinate
- Course: Permanent racing facility
- Course length: 22.799 km (14.167 mi)
- Distance: 7 laps, 159.543 km (99.135 mi)

Fastest lap
Driver	(Switzerland) Emmanuel de Graffenried	Maserati
- Time: 11:24.3

Podium
First	(Switzerland) Emmanuel de Graffenried	Maserati
Second	(Belgium) Paul Frère	HWM-Alta
Third	(United Kingdom) Peter Collins	HWM-Alta

The 17th Internationales ADAC-Eifelrennen was a non-championship Formula Two motor race held on 31 May 1953 at the Nürburgring circuit. The race was run over 7 laps of the circuit, and was won by Swiss driver Emmanuel de Graffenried in a Maserati A6GCM. de Graffenried also set fastest lap. Paul Frère finished second and Peter Collins third in their HWM-Altas.

== Results ==
Pos	No.	Driver	Entrant	Constructor	Time/Position
1	17	(Switzerland) Emmanuel de Graffenried	Baron de Graffenried	Maserati A6GCM	1:24:32.0, 113.24 kph
2	12	(Belgium) Paul Frère	HW Motors Ltd.	HWM-Alta	+1.7s
3	11	(United Kingdom) Peter Collins	HW Motors Ltd.	HWM-Alta	+16.3s
4	34	(Germany) Kurt Adolff	Ecurie Espadon	Ferrari 500	+53.5s
5	35	(Germany) Edgar Barth	Rennkollektiv EMW	EMW-BMW 328	+4:16.5
6	8	(United Kingdom) Stirling Moss	Cooper Car Company	Cooper T24-Alta	+4:31.9
7	24	(Germany) Theo Helfrich	Theo Helfrich	Veritas RS	+5:20.8
8	22	(Germany) Wolfgang Seidel	Wolfgang Seidel	Veritas RS	+6:15.8
9	9	(United States) Fred Wacker	Equipe Gordini	Gordini Type 16	+7:58.2
10	33	(Germany) Hans Blees	Hans Blees	AFM-BMW 328	+8:45.0
11	19	(Thailand) B. Bira	Prince Birabongse	Maserati A6GCM	+14:23.9
12	32	(Germany) Adolf Lang	Adolf Lang	Veritas RS	+1 lap
13	25	(Germany) Clemens Sandgathe	Clemens Sandgathe	BMW Eigenbau-BMW 328	
Ret.	14	(United Kingdom) Rodney Nuckey	Rodney Nuckey	Cooper T23-Bristol	5 laps, magneto
Ret	30	(Germany) Hans Klenk	Hans Klenk	Veritas Meteor	5 laps, engine/back axle
Ret	10	(Germany) Lance Macklin	HW Motors	HWM-Alta	5 laps, ignition
Ret.	21	(Germany) Hans Stuck	Hans Stuck	AFM-Küchen	3 laps, ignition
Ret.	23	(Germany) Willi Heeks	Hans Stuck	Veritas Meteor	1 lap, accident
Ret.	16	(United States) Melvin Stickney	Melvin Stickney	Veritas RS	1 lap, engine
Ret.	20	(Germany) Paul Pietsch	Scuderia Milan	Maserati A6GCM	
Ret.	31	(Germany) Hans Herrmann	Hans Klenk	Veritas RS-BMW 328	
Ret.	29	(Germany) Ernst Lautenschlager	Ernst Lautenschlager	Veritas RS-BMW 328	
Ret.	18	(Brazil) Francisco Landi	Francisco Landi	Maserati A6GCM	

Previous race: 1953 Snetterton Coronation Trophy	Formula One non-championship races 1953 season	Next race: 1953 Albi Grand Prix
Previous race: 1952 Eifelrennen	Eifelrennen	Next race: 1954 Eifelrennen
