= Veritas Meteor =

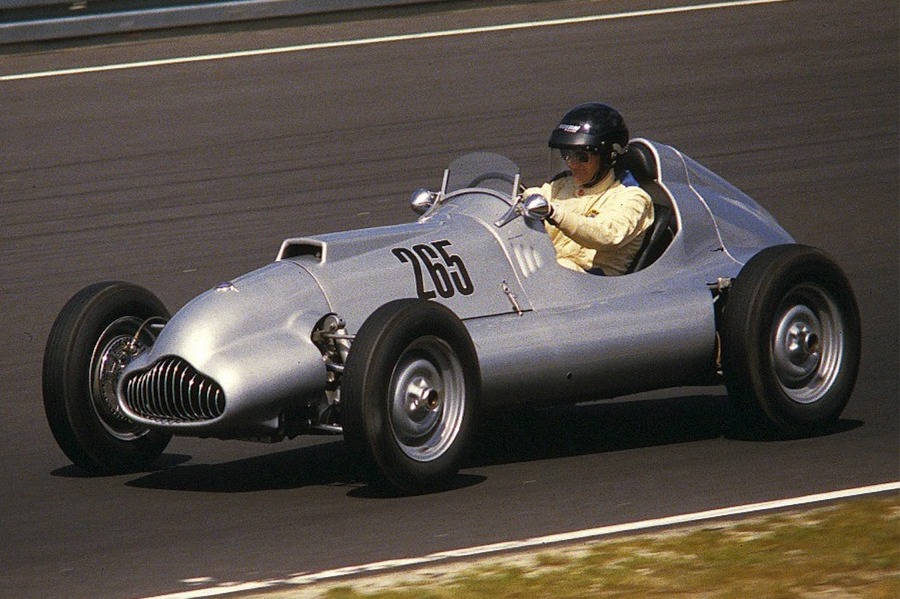

Overview
- Manufacturer: Veritas
- Production: 1951–1954
- Designer: Ernst Loof

Body and chassis
- Class: Racing car
- Body style: Single-seater

Powertrain
- Engine: 1,988 cc (121.3 cu in) inline-6

Dimensions
- Wheelbase: 2,250 mm (89 in)
- Length: 3,370 mm (133 in)
- Width: 1,550 mm (61 in)
- Height: 1,050 mm (41 in)
- Curb weight: 560 kg (1,230 lb)

The Veritas Meteor was a Formula One and Formula 2 race car that raced for Veritas and private stables from 1951 until 1954.

== Design and development ==
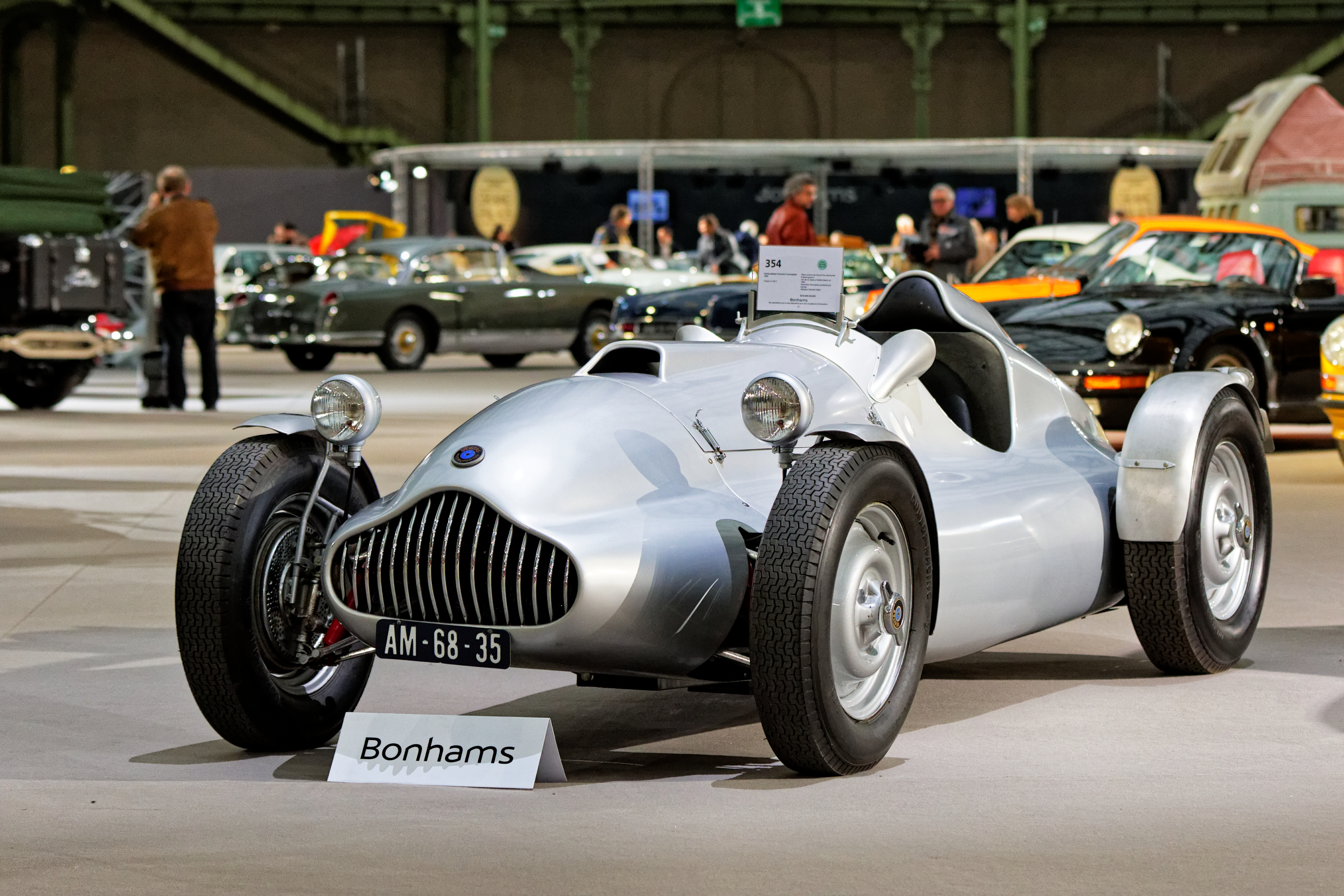
Veritas Meteor Formula 2 car

In 1949, designer Ernst Loof created the Veritas Meteor, a monoposto or single-seater with free-standing wheels based on the then valid Formula 2, according to which the 1952 and 1953 races for the automobile world championship were held. Racing cars with up to 500 cm³ and a supercharger or with a maximum of 2000 cm³ without a supercharger were allowed.

The basis of the engine in the Veritas Meteor manufactured by Heinkel was the six-cylinder of the BMW 328, which was further developed by former BMW employees Karl Schäfer, Karl Rech, and Max Knoch. The eye-catching feature of the new in-line engine with a displacement of 1,988 cc (121.3 cu in) with the bore and stroke both being 75 mm (3.0 in) was the overhead camshaft, which controlled the valves hanging in the cylinder head in a V-shape. The crankshaft ran in lead-bronze bearings, while the connecting rods were roller-mounted on both the crank pins and the gudgeon pins. The engine produced 140 hp at 7000 rpm; it was water-cooled with 10 liters of water circulating and had dry-sump lubrication with a capacity of 12 liters.

The power was transmitted to a self-locking differential and to the rear wheels via a single-plate dry clutch, a five-speed gearbox with a special oil pump, and a Cardan shaft. Depending on the race track, the gears of the differential could be changed to adjust the gear ratio.

The frame of the Veritas Meteor consisted of a tube lattice (trellis tube frame). The front wheels were suspended on double triangular links, with a longitudinal torsion bar acting on the upper links and the slanted telescopic shock absorbers supported on the lower links. The rear double-jointed axle, which was also torsion-bar-sprung, had a wishbone on each side and an additional wishbone above the differential, and from 1952 a De Dion support tube behind the differential.

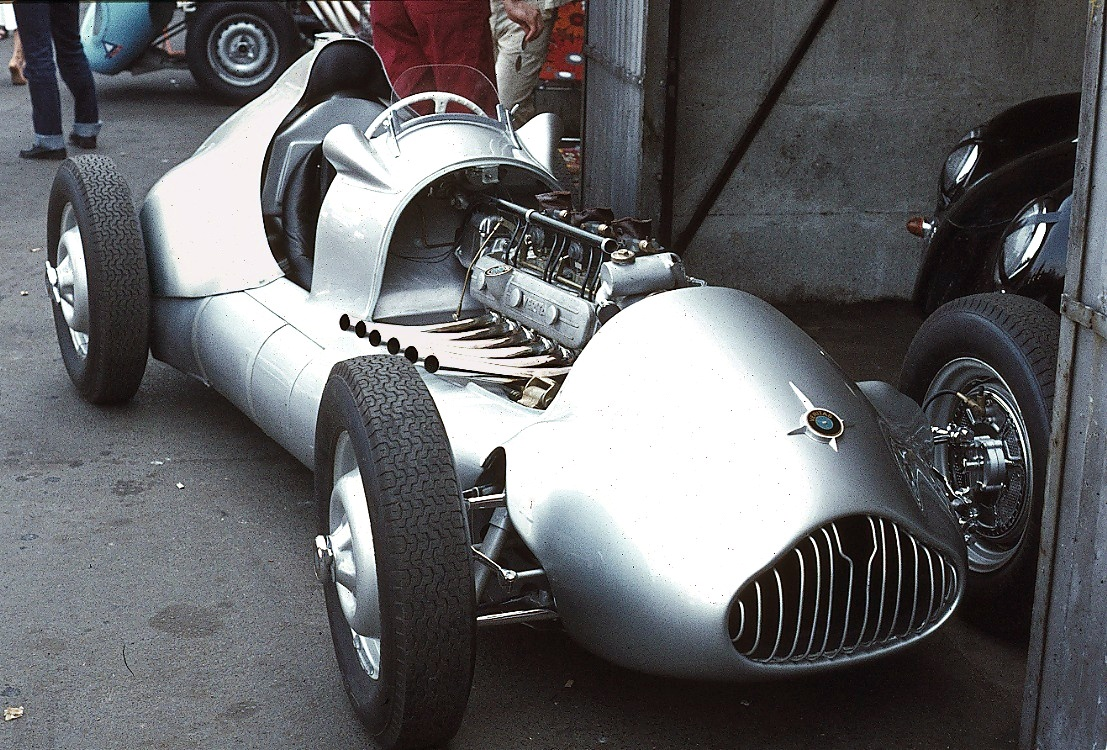
Veritas Meteor

The foot brake acted hydraulically on four light-alloy drums via two brake cylinders. The car was driven either with steel disc wheels or with Rudge steel spoke wheels, both versions with center locks.

In 1950, the Hebmüller bodywork factory built a streamlined body for a Veritas Meteor on the order of the racing driver Karl Kling. Kling won the Solitude race with the car on August 13 of the same year. In 1951, Kling passed the car on to Hans Klenk, who the following year also had a normal racing car body (with free-standing wheels) made for slow and maneuverable courses. In this variant, Hans Herrmann started on August 2, 1953, at the German Grand Prix on the Nürburgring. Another streamlined body was made by Veritas at the Nürburgring for Paul Pietsch's Meteor. In contrast to the Hebmüller body, this had a closed cockpit and could be fitted over the existing racing car body if required. Pietsch wanted to start with it at the Avus race in 1952, but had a serious accident during practice, in which the car was severely damaged.

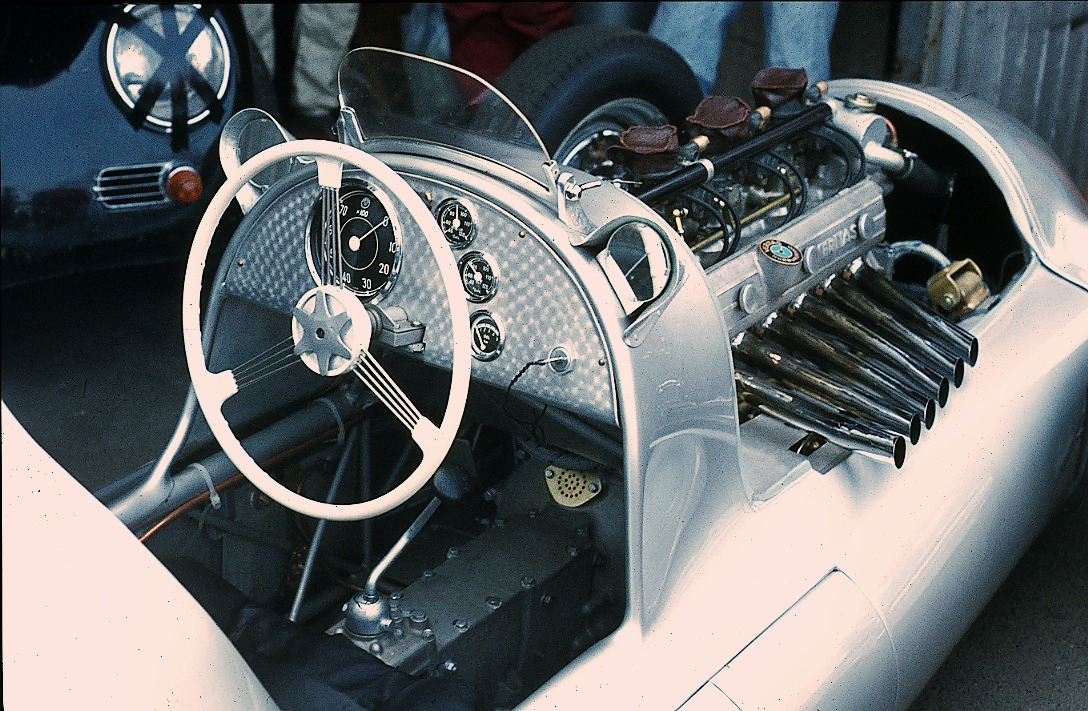
Veritas Meteor Cockpit

The Veritas Meteor did not achieve great success, probably due to the tense situation of the company since its founding.

== Technical data ==
Technical data	Veritas Meteor
Engine:	Front mounted 6-cylinder in-line engine
Cylinder:	1988 cm³
Bore x stroke:	75 x 75 mm
Compression:	12.0:1
Max power at rpm:	140 hp at 7 000 rpm
Valve control:	Overhead Camshafts per cylinder bank
Carburetor:	3 Solex API 40
Gearbox:	5-speed (4 gears synchronized)
suspension front:	Double wishbones, longitudinal torsion bars
suspension rear:	Wishbone and De-Dion support tube, longitudinal torsion bars
Brakes:	Drum brake 300mm
Chassis & body:	trellis tube frame
Wheelbase:	225 cm
Dry weight:	560 kg
Maximum speed:	240 km/h

== Formula One and Sports Car racing history ==
Swiss driver Peter Hirt was entered for the Swiss Grand Prix in 1951 with a Veritas Meteor. Veritas is therefore generally regarded as the first German automobile brand to take part in a Formula 1 race. However, the vehicle was a car with a 2-liter engine corresponding to the Formula 2 of the time, which the organizers and two English Formula 2 HWM had approved. The Veritas was unable to start the race because Hirt had to give up at the start due to a defective fuel pump.

The Veritas cars were also used in the Drivers' World Championship at the German Grand Prix and the Belgian Grand Prix in 1952 and 1953, with Fritz Riess achieving the best result at the 1952 German Grand Prix with seventh place in his Veritas RS.

In 1950 the house was again forced to change headquarters: Ernst Loof, who remained alone at the top of the company, moved Veritas near the Nürburgring, where he took care of the construction of cars for the Formula One championships: the Meteor and the already produced RS. The Meteor was therefore deployed in some races of the Formula One championships of 1951, 1952, and 1953. In 1954 the German driver Hans Klenk competed for a modified version of the Meteor (The Klenk Meteor) in the German Grand Prix driven by driver Theo Helfrich, then retired on the 9th lap. In total, however, the results were poor and forced the German house to cease production in 1953 and definitively close.

A total of 71 class victories were achieved in circuit and mountain races in Germany (Allied Occupation Zones, Federal Republic of Germany, GDR, and Saarland ). There were also numerous other class victories at smaller events in Switzerland, Austria, Belgium, Sweden, France, the Netherlands, Great Britain, Italy, Yugoslavia, and Denmark. The last models remained in racing use until the 1960s.

Ernst Loof also took part in the 1953 Monte Carlo Rally on a Veritas Nürburgring with co-driver Josef Cremer. In 1954 – now already employed by BMW – he competed again with a BMW 501 and Hans Wencher as a passenger.

The racing driver Émile Cornet, who had also competed in Veritas cars during the course of the season, became Belgian champion in 1950.

Between 1948 and 1953, a total of 13 German championship titles were won with Veritas racing and sports cars.
