= Karl Kling =

German racing driver (1910–2003)

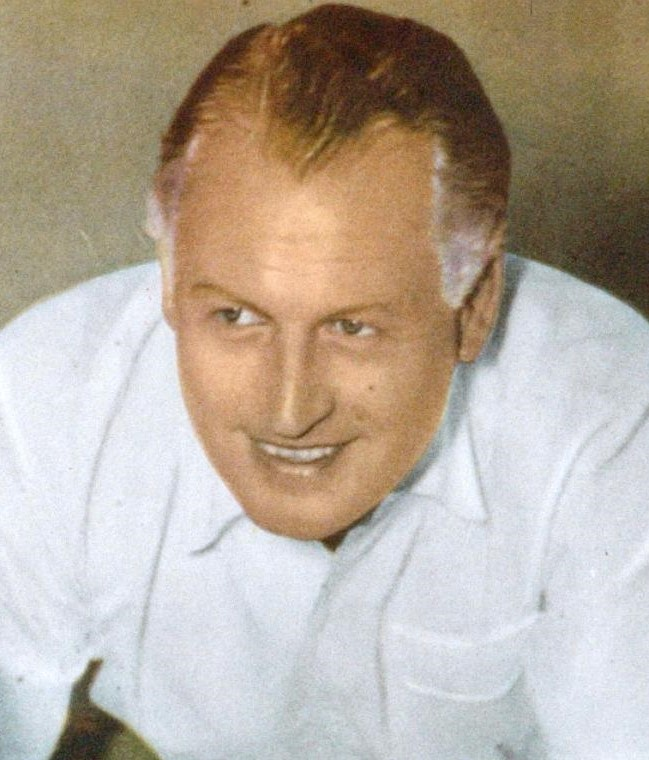
- Kling in 1951
- Born: 16 September 1910; Giessen, Hesse, German Empire
- Died: 18 March 2003 (aged 92); Lake Constance, Germany

Formula One World Championship career
- Nationality: (West Germany) West German
- Active years: 1954–1955
- Team: Mercedes
- Entries: 11
- Championships: 0
- Wins: 0
- Podiums: 2
- Career points: 17
- Pole positions: 0
- Fastest laps: 1
- First entry: 1954 French Grand Prix
- Last entry: 1955 Italian Grand Prix

Karl Kling (German pronunciation: [kaʁl klɪŋ]; 16 September 1910 – 18 March 2003) was a German racing driver and motorsport executive, who competed in Formula One at 11 Grands Prix from 1954 to 1955.

An employee of Daimler-Benz since the mid-1930s, Kling made his Formula One debut at the 1954 French Grand Prix, where he finished second to Mercedes teammate Juan Manuel Fangio, becoming the first German driver to score a podium finish in Formula One. He participated in ten further World Championship Grands Prix, achieving another podium at the 1955 British Grand Prix and scoring a total of 17 championship points.

Upon retiring from motor racing, Kling became the head of Mercedes-Benz in motorsport from 1956 to 1968.

== Early life and career ==
Kling was born on 16 September 1910 in Giessen, Grand Duchy of Hesse, German Empire.

It is said, that Kling was born too late and too early. Too late to be in the successful Mercedes team of the 1930s and too early to have a real chance in 1954 and 1955. Unusually, Kling found his way into motorsport via his first job as a reception clerk at Daimler-Benz in the mid-1930s, competing in hillclimb and trials events in production machinery in his spare time. During the Second World War, he gained mechanical experience servicing Luftwaffe aircraft, and after the cessation of hostilities he resumed his motorsport involvement in a BMW 328.

Kling was instrumental in developing Mercedes' return to international competition in the early 1950s, which started at the 1951 Buenos Aires Grand Prix (I) and (II) Formula Libre races, with pre-war supercharged Mercedes-Benz W154 and the first Mercedes factory drive for Juan Manuel Fangio. In 1952, Mercedes raced sports cars, the Mercedes-Benz 300SL (W194). Kling's win in the 1952 Carrera Panamericana road race was a defining point in assuring the Daimler-Benz management that motorsport had a place in Mercedes' future, as it boosted sales in North America and led to the road-going 300 SL Gullwing plus the smaller 190 SL roadster. Besides, together with Hans Klenk, Kling pioneered the use of pacenotes in racing.

Kling was called up to the revived Mercedes Grand Prix squad in the 1954 Formula One season; Mercedes had not competed in the first two rounds that were won by Fangio driving a Maserati. He finished less than one second behind then only one-time champion Fangio on his Formula One debut, taking second place in the 1954 French Grand Prix at the fast Reims-Gueux circuit. This promising start was not to last, though, as Kling could only score one more podium, in 1955. Young Hans Herrmann as third driver, and veteran Hermann Lang as a fourth driver in the 1954 German GP, did not fare any better.

However, away from the World Championship, Kling took an impressive victory in the September 1954 Berlin Grand Prix exhibition at AVUS, another high-speed circuit, with banking.

In addition to the 1955 Formula One season, Mercedes entered the 1955 World Sportscar Championship, were usually two drivers per car were needed in endurance races. With the arrival of Stirling Moss, Kling was effectively demoted to third driver in a four driver team that in January entered four F1 in the very hot 1955 Argentine Grand Prix, and in May four 300 SLR in the 1955 Mille Miglia. Kling was driving singlehandedly, like Fangio. He crashed exiting Rome, broke some ribs, and missed the 1955 Monaco GP. With two 2nd places at the two sports car races that remained after the Le Mans disaster, Fangio/Kling helped Mercedes clinch the World Sportscar Championship, not by earning any more points for Mercedes than the wins by Moss did, but by preventing competitors from scoring higher.

Having won all three world championships they competed for, F1 in 1954 and 1955, plus sports cars in 1955, Mercedes retired from international racing after 1955 to focus on road car development. Kling succeeded Alfred Neubauer as head of Mercedes motorsport, with stock models only. He was in this post during their successful rallying campaigns of the 1960s, occasionally taking the wheel himself. On one such occasion he drove a Mercedes-Benz 220SE to victory in the mighty 1961 trans-African Algiers-Bangui-Algiers Rally.

Kling died in 2003 at the age of 92.

== Complete Formula One World Championship results ==
(key)

Year	Entrant	Chassis	Engine	1	2	3	4	5	6	7	8	9	WDC	Points
1954	Daimler-Benz AG	Mercedes W196	Mercedes straight-8	ARG	500	BEL	FRA; 2	GBR; 7	GER; 4	SUI; Ret	ITA; Ret	ESP; 5	5th	12
1955	Daimler-Benz AG	Mercedes W196	Mercedes straight-8	ARG; 4*	MON	500	BEL; Ret	NED; Ret	GBR; 3	ITA; Ret			11th	5

* Shared drive with Stirling Moss and Hans Herrmann.

=== Non-championship results ===
(key) (Races in bold indicate pole position) (Races in italics indicate fastest lap)

Year	Entrant	Chassis	Engine	1	2	3	4	5	6	7	8	9	10	11	12	13	14	15	16	17	18	19	20	21	22	23	24	25
1954	Daimler-Benz AG	Mercedes W196	Mercedes straight-8	SYR	PAU	LAV	BOR	INT	BAR	CUR	ROM	FRO	COR	BRC	CRY	ROU	CAE	AUG	COR	OUL	RED	PES	SAC	JOE	CAD	BER; 1	GOO	DTT

=== Complete 24 Hours of Le Mans results ===
Year	Team	Co-Drivers	Car	Class	Laps	Pos.	Class Pos.
1952	(West Germany) Daimler-Benz AG	(West Germany) Hans Klenk	Mercedes-Benz W194	S 3.0		DNF	DNF
1953	(Italy) SpA Alfa Romeo	(West Germany) Fritz Riess	Alfa Romeo 6C 3000 CM	S5.0	133	DNF (Transmission)	
1955	(West Germany) Daimler Benz AG	(France) Andre Simon	Mercedes-Benz 300 SLR	S3.0	130	DNF	DNF

Awards
Preceded by Paul Falk	German Sportsman of the Year; 1952	Succeeded by Werner Haas
