= Arthur Legat =

Belgian racing driver (1898–1960)

- Arthur Legat during the 1952 Belgium GP
- Born: 1 November 1898; Haine-Saint-Paul, Wallonia, Belgium
- Died: 23 February 1960 (aged 61); Haine-Saint-Pierre, Wallonia, Belgium

Formula One World Championship career
- Nationality: (Belgium) Belgian
- Active years: 1952–1953
- Team: privateer Veritas
- Entries: 2
- Championships: 0
- Wins: 0
- Podiums: 0
- Career points: 0
- Pole positions: 0
- Fastest laps: 0
- First entry: 1952 Belgian Grand Prix
- Last entry: 1953 Belgian Grand Prix

Arthur Legat (French pronunciation: [aʁtyʁ leɡa]; 1 November 1898 – 23 February 1960) was a Belgian racing driver. He participated in two Formula One World Championship Grands Prix, debuting on 22 June 1952. He scored no championship points.

Legat won the Grand Prix des Frontières at Chimay in 1931 and 1932 with a Bugatti.

== Complete Formula One World Championship results ==
(key)

| Year | Entrant | Chassis | Engine | 1 | 2 | 3 | 4 | 5 | 6 | 7 | 8 | 9 | WDC | Points |
|---|---|---|---|---|---|---|---|---|---|---|---|---|---|---|
| 1952 | Arthur Legat | Veritas Meteor | Veritas Straight-6 | SUI | 500 | BEL; 13 | FRA | GBR | GER | NED | ITA | | NC | 0 |
| 1953 | Arthur Legat | Veritas Meteor | Veritas Straight-6 | ARG | 500 | NED | BEL; Ret | FRA | GBR | GER | SUI | ITA | NC | 0 |
