= Theo Helfrich =

German racing driver (1913–1978)

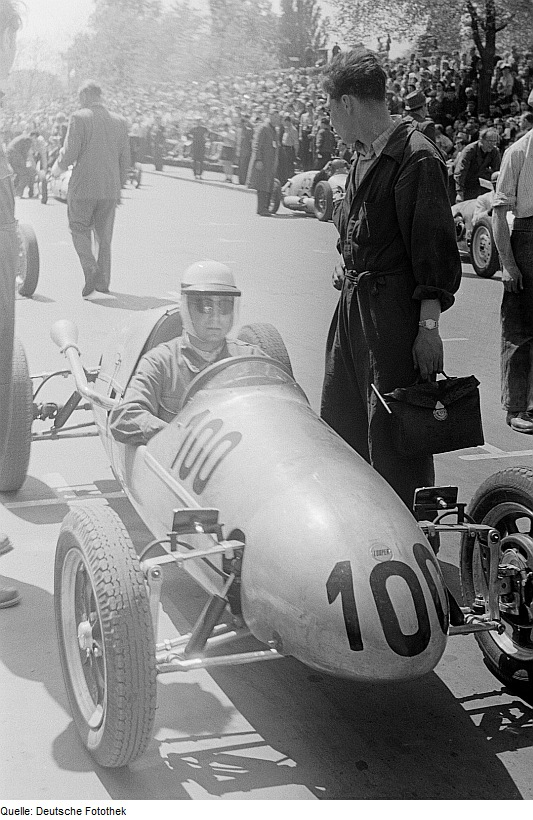
- Theo Helfrich sitting in his MkVIII Cooper 500 Formula Three car, at the 6th Leipziger Stadtparkrennen, 16 May 1954
- Born: Theodor Karl Helfrich; 13 May 1913; Frankfurt am Main, Hesse, German Empire
- Died: 29 April 1978 (aged 64); Ludwigshafen am Rhein, Rhine Province, West Germany

Formula One World Championship career
- Nationality: (Germany) West German
- Active years: 1952–1954
- Team(s): Veritas, Klenk
- Entries: 3
- Championships: 0
- Wins: 0
- Podiums: 0
- Career points: 0
- Pole positions: 0
- Fastest laps: 0
- First entry: 1952 German Grand Prix
- Last entry: 1954 German Grand Prix

Theodor Karl Helfrich (13 May 1913 – 29 April 1978) was a racing driver from Germany. He participated in three World Championship Grands Prix, debuting on 3 August 1952, but scored no championship points. He was German Formula Two Champion in 1953, took a number of wins in the German Formula Three Championship in a Cooper-Norton, and finished in second place in the 1952 24 Hours of Le Mans race.

== Complete World Championship results ==
(key)

Year	Entrant	Chassis	Engine	1	2	3	4	5	6	7	8	9	WDC	Points
1952	Theo Helfrich	Veritas RS	Veritas-L6	SUI	500	BEL	FRA	GBR	GER; Ret	NED	ITA		NC	0
1953	Theo Helfrich	Veritas RS	Veritas-L6	ARG	500	NED	BEL	FRA	GBR	GER; 12	SUI	ITA	NC	0
1954	Hans Klenk	Klenk Meteor	BMW-L6	ARG	500	BEL	FRA	GBR	GER; Ret	SUI	ITA	ESP	NC	0

== 24 Hours of Le Mans results ==
Year	Team	Co-Drivers	Car	Class	Laps	Pos.	Class Pos.
1952	(Germany) Daimler-Benz A.G.	(Germany) Helmut Niedermayr	Mercedes-Benz W194	S 3.0	276	2nd	2nd
