= Roger Laurent =

Belgian motorcycle racer and racing driver (1913–1997)

- Born: 21 February 1913; Liège, Belgium
- Died: 6 February 1997 (aged 83); Uccle, Belgium

Formula One World Championship career
- Nationality: (Belgium) Belgian
- Active years: 1952
- Team(s): HWM, non-works Ferrari
- Entries: 2
- Championships: 0
- Wins: 0
- Podiums: 0
- Career points: 0
- Pole positions: 0
- Fastest laps: 0
- First entry: 1952 Belgian Grand Prix
- Last entry: 1952 German Grand Prix

Roger Laurent (French pronunciation: [ʁɔ.ʒe lɔ.ʁɑ̃]; 21 February 1913 – 6 February 1997) was a racing driver and motorcycle racer from Belgium. He was born in Liège and died in Uccle. Laurent competed aboard a Moto Guzzi in the 1949 Grand Prix motorcycle racing season, entering the Belgian Grand Prix. He also participated in two World Championship Formula One Grands Prix, debuting on 22 June 1952. He scored no championship points.

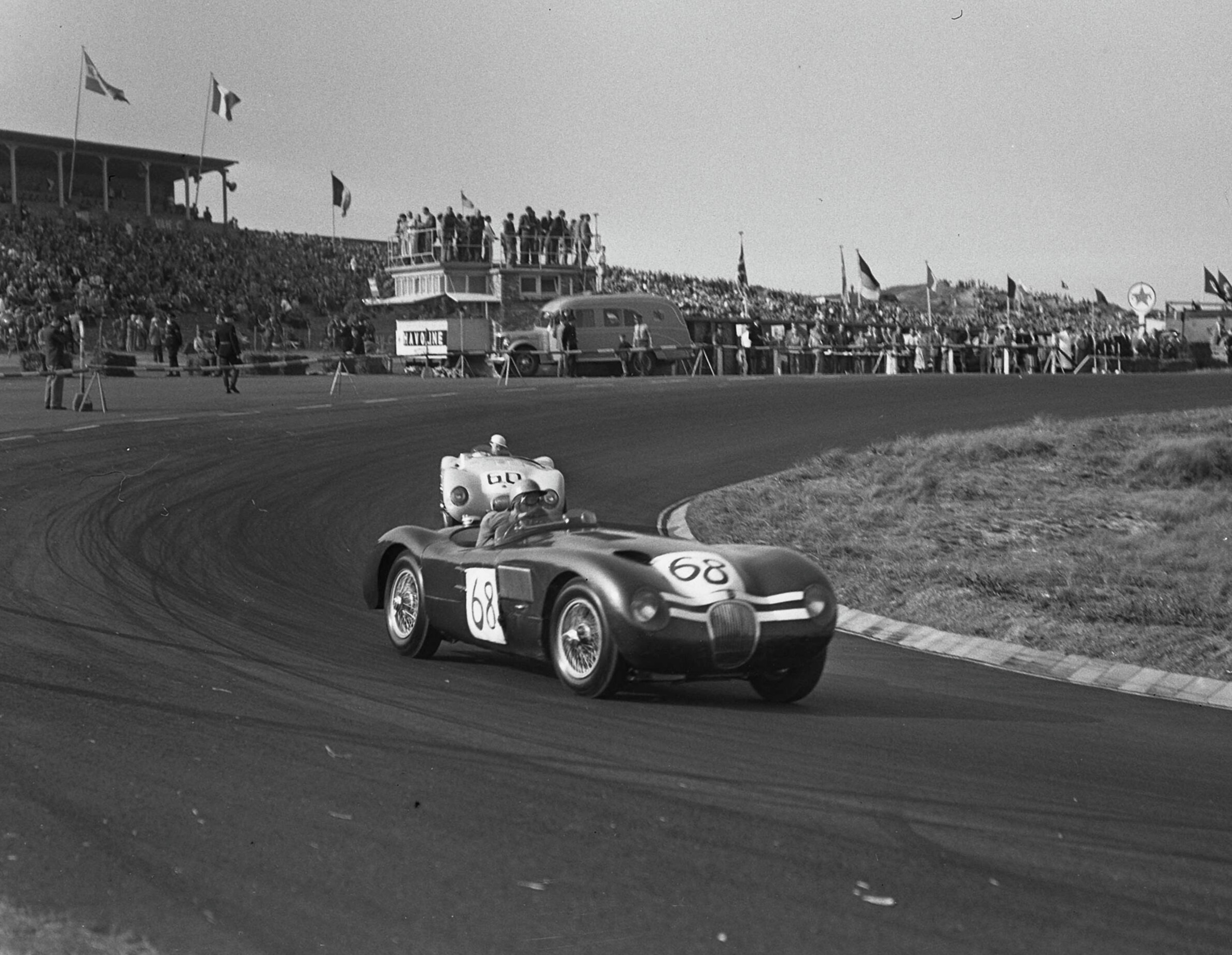
Roger Laurent, driving an Ecurie Francorchamps-entered Jaguar C-Type (#60), chases Ninian Sanderson in the similar Ecurie Ecosse car (#68) at Circuit Zandvoort in 1954

== Complete Formula One World Championship results ==
(key)

Year	Entrant	Chassis	Engine	1	2	3	4	5	6	7	8	WDC	Points
1952	HW Motors Ltd.	HWM	Alta Straight-4	SUI	500	BEL; 12	FRA	GBR				NC	0
1952	Ecurie Francorchamps	Ferrari 500	Ferrari Straight-4						GER; 6	NED	ITA	NC	0
