= 1954 Spanish Grand Prix =

← Previous race	Next race →
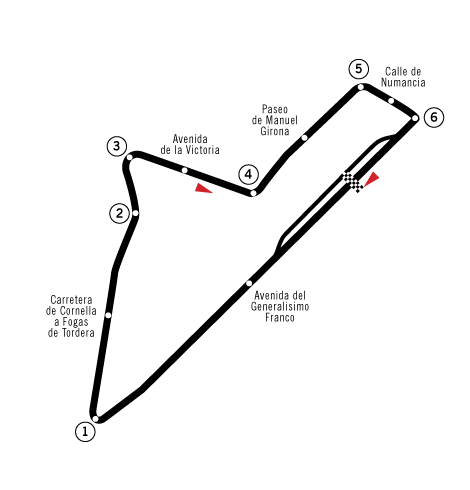
- Circuit Pedralbes layout

Race details
- Date: 24 October 1954
- Official name: XII Gran Premio de España
- Location: Pedralbes Circuit, Barcelona, Spain
- Course: Temporary street circuit
- Course length: 6.316 km (3.925 miles)
- Distance: 80 laps, 505.280 km (313.966 miles)
- Weather: Sunny, mild, dry

Pole position
Driver	(Italy) Alberto Ascari	Lancia
- Time: 2:18.1

Fastest lap
Driver	(Italy) Alberto Ascari	Lancia
- Time: 2:20.4 on lap 3

Podium
First	(United Kingdom) Mike Hawthorn	Ferrari
Second	(Italy) Luigi Musso	Maserati
Third	(Argentina) Juan Manuel Fangio	Mercedes

The 1954 Spanish Grand Prix was a Formula One motor race held on 24 October 1954 at Pedralbes. It was the ninth and final race in the 1954 World Championship of Drivers. The 80-lap race was won by Ferrari driver Mike Hawthorn after he started from third position. Luigi Musso finished second for the Maserati team and Mercedes driver Juan Manuel Fangio came in third.

== Race report ==
The long-awaited Lancia D50s arrived-using their 90 degree V8 engine as a stiffening aid for the chassis; they were simple but brilliantly designed. Alberto Ascari immediately set the fastest practice lap and led from pole.

Luigi Villoresi in the fellow Lancia retired with brake trouble after just 1 lap and Ascari succumbed to clutch problems after 9 laps.

Various other drivers took the lead and then retired; Harry Schell spun off, Maurice Trintignant had mechanical problems and Stirling Moss overheated (one of several retirements caused by flying newspaper jamming the radiator ducts). The race boiled down to a duel between Mike Hawthorn and Juan Manuel Fangio but the Argentine was losing oil and lost second place to Luigi Musso. Hawthorn hung on to take the win with Fangio driving well to claim the final podium position.

This proved to be the last major race held at the Pedralbes street circuit. The Le Mans disaster in 1955 meant tighter safety regulations, and the spectator-lined street circuit in the Pedralbes neighborhood of Barcelona was abandoned and has not been used since.

== Entries ==
Team	No	Driver	Car	Engine	Tyre
(Germany) Daimler Benz AG	2	(Argentina) Juan Manuel Fangio	Mercedes-Benz W196	Mercedes M196 2.5 L8	C
(Germany) Daimler Benz AG	4	(Germany) Karl Kling	Mercedes-Benz W196	Mercedes M196 2.5 L8	C
(Germany) Daimler Benz AG	6	(Germany) Hans Herrmann	Mercedes-Benz W196	Mercedes M196 2.5 L8	C
(Italy) Officine Alfieri Maserati	8	(United Kingdom) Stirling Moss	Maserati A6GCM/Maserati 250F	Maserati A6 2.0 L6	P
(Italy) Officine Alfieri Maserati	10	(Argentina) Roberto Mieres	Maserati A6GCM/Maserati 250F	Maserati A6 2.0 L6	P
(Italy) Officine Alfieri Maserati	12	(Italy) Sergio Mantovani	Maserati A6GCM/Maserati 250F	Maserati A6 2.0 L6	P
(Italy) Officine Alfieri Maserati	14	(Italy) Luigi Musso	Maserati A6GCM/Maserati 250F	Maserati A6 2.0 L6	P
(Italy) Officine Alfieri Maserati	16	(Spain) Paco Godia	Maserati A6GCM/Maserati 250F	Maserati A6 2.0 L6	P
(Thailand) Birabongse Bhanudej	18	(Thailand) Prince Bira	Maserati 250F	Maserati 250F1 2.5 L6	P
(France) Ecurie Rosier	20	(France) Robert Manzon	Ferrari 625 F1	Ferrari 625 2.5 L4	P D
(France) Ecurie Rosier	26	(France) Louis Rosier	Maserati 250F	Maserati 250F1 2.5 L6	P D
(Switzerland) Emmanuel de Graffenried	22	(Switzerland) Toulo de Graffenried	Maserati A6GCM	Maserati A6 2.0 L6	P
(Switzerland) Emmanuel de Graffenried	22	(Switzerland) Ottorino Volonterio	Maserati A6GCM	Maserati A6 2.0 L6	P
(United States) Harry Schell	24	(United States) Harry Schell	Maserati 250F	Maserati 250F1 2.5 L6	P
(United Kingdom) Owen Racing Organisation	28	(United Kingdom) Ken Wharton	Maserati 250F	Maserati 250F1 2.5 L6	D
(Belgium) Ecurie Francorchamps	30	(Belgium) Jacques Swaters	Ferrari 500	Ferrari 500 2.0 L4	E
(Italy) Scuderia Lancia	34	(Italy) Alberto Ascari	Lancia D50	Lancia DS50 2.5 V8	P
(Italy) Scuderia Lancia	36	(Italy) Luigi Villoresi	Lancia D50	Lancia DS50 2.5 V8	P
(Italy) Scuderia Ferrari	38	(United Kingdom) Mike Hawthorn	Ferrari 553	Ferrari 554 2.5 L4	P
(Italy) Scuderia Ferrari	40	(France) Maurice Trintignant	Ferrari 625 F1	Ferrari 625 2.5 L4	P
(United Kingdom) Vandervell Products	42	(United Kingdom) Peter Collins	Vanwall	Vanwall 254 2.5 L4	P
(France) Equipe Gordini	46	(France) Jean Behra	Gordini T16	Gordini 23 2.5 L6	E
(France) Equipe Gordini	48	(France) Jacques Pollet	Gordini T16	Gordini 23 2.5 L6	E

== Classification ==
=== Qualifying ===
Pos	No	Driver	Constructor	Time	Gap
1	34	(Italy) Alberto Ascari	Lancia	2:18.1	—
2	2	(Argentina) Juan Manuel Fangio	Mercedes	2:19.1	+ 1.0
3	38	(United Kingdom) Mike Hawthorn	Ferrari	2:20.6	+ 2.5
4	24	(United States) Harry Schell	Maserati	2:20.6	+ 2.5
5	36	(Italy) Luigi Villoresi	Lancia	2:21.0	+ 2.9
6	8	(United Kingdom) Stirling Moss	Maserati	2:21.1	+ 3.0
7	14	(Italy) Luigi Musso	Maserati	2:21.5	+ 3.4
8	40	(France) Maurice Trintignant	Ferrari	2:21.9	+ 3.8
9	6	(Germany) Hans Herrmann	Mercedes	2:21.9	+ 3.8
10	12	(Italy) Sergio Mantovani	Maserati	2:22.0	+ 3.9
11	10	(Argentina) Roberto Mieres	Maserati	2:22.3	+ 4.2
12	4	(Germany) Karl Kling	Mercedes	2:23.4	+ 5.3
13	16	(Spain) Paco Godia	Maserati	2:24.2	+ 6.1
14	28	(United Kingdom) Ken Wharton	Maserati	2:25.7	+ 7.6
15	18	(Thailand) Prince Bira	Maserati	2:26.1	+ 8.0
16	48	(France) Jacques Pollet	Gordini	2:27.4	+ 9.3
17	20	(France) Robert Manzon	Ferrari	2:27.5	+ 9.4
18	46	(France) Jean Behra	Gordini	2:27.8	+ 9.7
19	30	(Belgium) Jacques Swaters	Ferrari	2:28.0	+ 9.9
20	26	(France) Louis Rosier	Maserati	2:29.8	+ 11.7
21	22	(Switzerland) Toulo de Graffenried	Maserati	2:29.8	+ 11.7
DNS	42	(United Kingdom) Peter Collins	Vanwall		

=== Race ===
Pos	No	Driver	Constructor	Laps	Time/Retired	Grid	Points
1	38	(United Kingdom) Mike Hawthorn	Ferrari	80	3:13:52.1	3	8
2	14	(Italy) Luigi Musso	Maserati	80	+1:13.2	7	6
3	2	(Argentina) Juan Manuel Fangio	Mercedes	79	+1 lap	2	4
4	10	(Argentina) Roberto Mieres	Maserati	79	+1 lap	11	3
5	4	(Germany) Karl Kling	Mercedes	79	+1 lap	12	2
6	16	(Spain) Paco Godia	Maserati	76	+4 laps	13	
7	26	(France) Louis Rosier	Maserati	74	+6 laps	20	
8	28	(United Kingdom) Ken Wharton	Maserati	74	+6 laps	14	
9	18	(Thailand) Prince Bira	Maserati	68	+12 laps	15	
Ret	12	(Italy) Sergio Mantovani	Maserati	58	Brakes	10	
Ret	22	(Switzerland) Toulo de Graffenried (Switzerland) Ottorino Volonterio	Maserati	57	Engine	21	
Ret	6	(Germany) Hans Herrmann	Mercedes	50	Injection	9	
Ret	40	(France) Maurice Trintignant	Ferrari	47	Gearbox	8	
Ret	48	(France) Jacques Pollet	Gordini	37	Engine	16	
Ret	24	(United States) Harry Schell	Maserati	29	Transmission	4	
Ret	8	(United Kingdom) Stirling Moss	Maserati	20	Oil pump	6	
Ret	46	(France) Jean Behra	Gordini	17	Brakes	18	
Ret	30	(Belgium) Jacques Swaters	Ferrari	16	Engine	19	
Ret	34	(Italy) Alberto Ascari	Lancia	10	Clutch	1	1^{1}
Ret	36	(Italy) Luigi Villoresi	Lancia	2	Brakes	5	
Ret	20	(France) Robert Manzon	Ferrari	2	Engine	17	
DNS	42	(United Kingdom) Peter Collins	Vanwall		Non-starter – accident		

Notes

- ^1 – 1 point for fastest lap

== Shared drives ==
Car #22: Toulo de Graffenried (30 laps) and Ottorino Volonterio (27 laps)

== Final Championship standings ==
- **Bold text** indicates the World Champion.

Drivers' Championship standings

	Pos	Driver	Points
	1	(Argentina) **Juan Manuel Fangio**	42 (57 1/7)
	2	(Argentina) José Froilán González	25 1/7 (26 9/14)
1	3	(United Kingdom) Mike Hawthorn	24 9/14
1	4	(France) Maurice Trintignant	17
	5	(Germany) Karl Kling	12

- Note: Only the top five positions are included. Only the best 5 results counted towards the Championship. Numbers without parentheses are Championship points; numbers in parentheses are total points scored.

Previous race: 1954 Italian Grand Prix	FIA Formula One World Championship; 1954 season	Next race: 1955 Argentine Grand Prix
Previous race: 1951 Spanish Grand Prix	Spanish Grand Prix	Next race: 1967 Spanish Grand Prix
