= Josef Peters (racing driver) =

German racing driver (1914–2001)

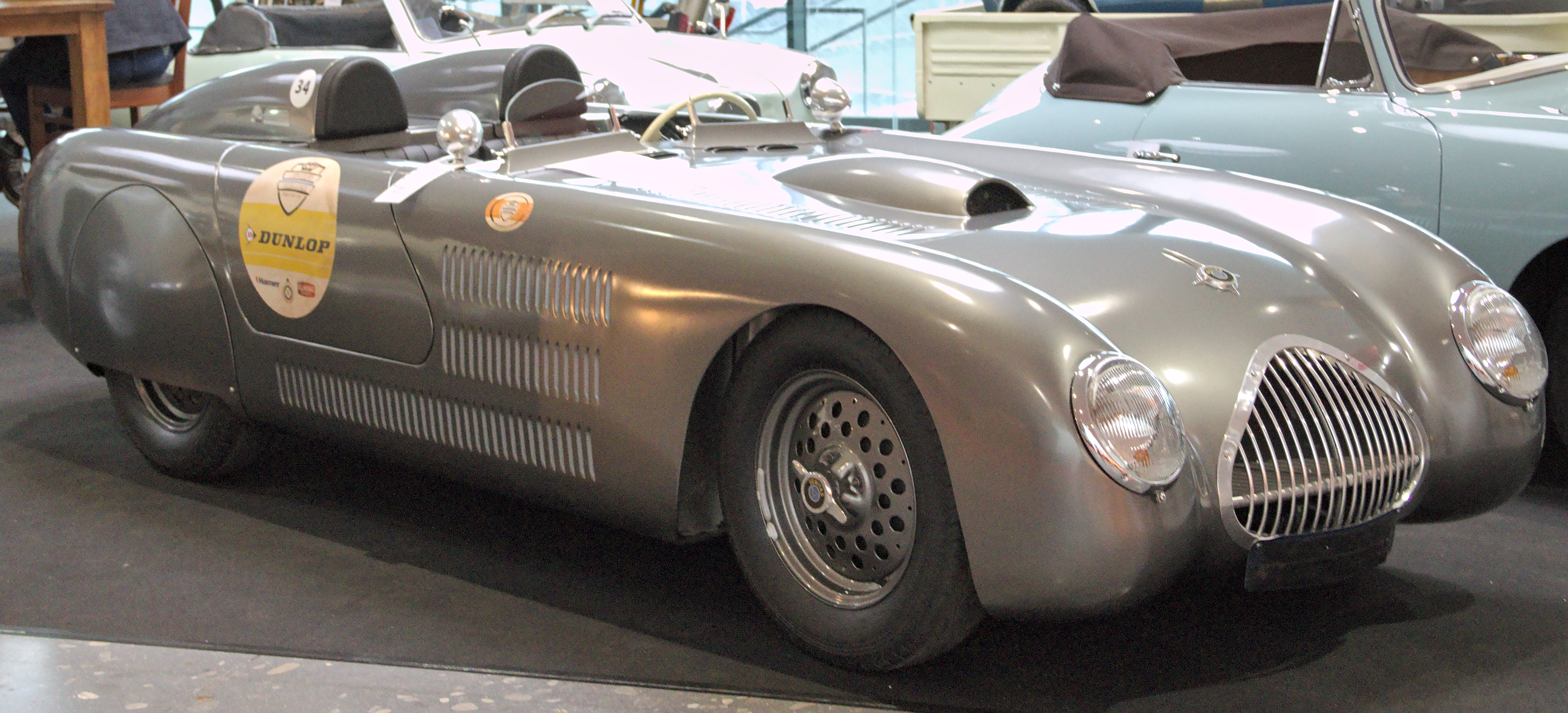
- Born: 16 September 1914; Düsseldorf, Germany
- Died: 24 April 2001 (aged 86); Düsseldorf, Germany

Formula One World Championship career
- Nationality: (Germany) German
- Active years: 1952
- Team: privateer Veritas
- Entries: 1
- Championships: 0
- Wins: 0
- Podiums: 0
- Career points: 0
- Pole positions: 0
- Fastest laps: 0
- First entry: 1952 German Grand Prix

Josef Peters (16 September 1914 – 24 April 2001) was a racing driver from Düsseldorf, Germany. He participated in one Formula One World Championship Grand Prix, on 3 August 1952. He failed to finish, scoring no championship points.

== Complete Formula One World Championship results ==
(key)

Year	Entrant	Chassis	Engine	1	2	3	4	5	6	7	8	WDC	Points
1952	Josef Peters	Veritas RS	BMW Straight-6	SUI	500	BEL	FRA	GBR	GER; Ret	NED	ITA	NC	0
