= 1954 Belgian Grand Prix =

| ← Previous race | Next race → |
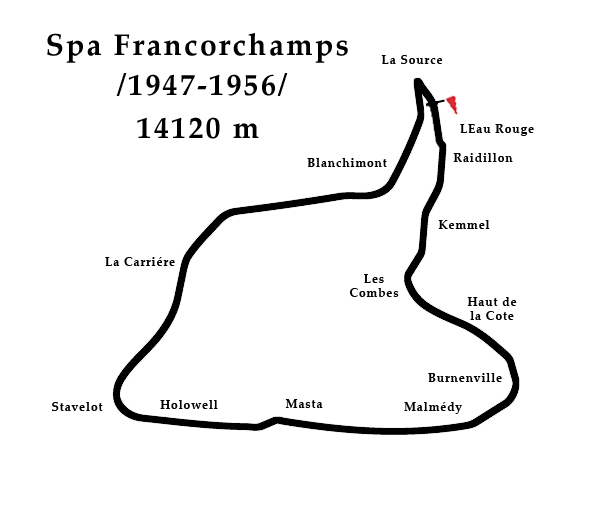
- Spa-Francorchamps layout

Race details
- Date: 20 June 1954
- Official name: XVI Grand Prix de Belgique
- Location: Circuit de Spa-Francorchamps, Francorchamps, Belgium
- Course: Permanent racing circuit
- Course length: 14.120 km (8.774 miles)
- Distance: 36 laps, 508.320 km (315.855 miles)
- Weather: Sunny, mild, dry

Pole position
| Driver | (Argentina) Juan Manuel Fangio | Maserati |
- Time: 4:22.1

Fastest lap
| Driver | (Argentina) Juan Manuel Fangio | Maserati |
- Time: 4:25.5 on lap 13

Podium
| First | (Argentina) Juan Manuel Fangio | Maserati |
| Second | (France) Maurice Trintignant | Ferrari |
| Third | (United Kingdom) Stirling Moss | Maserati |

The 1954 Belgian Grand Prix was a Formula One motor race held at Spa-Francorchamps on 20 June 1954. It was race 3 of 9 in the 1954 World Championship of Drivers. The 36-lap race was won by Maserati driver Juan Manuel Fangio after he started from pole position. Maurice Trintignant finished second for the Ferrari team with Fangio's teammate Stirling Moss in third.

== Background ==
The opening race of the 1954 Formula One season was held in Argentina in January and won by Juan Manuel Fangio driving a Maserati. The second race that counted towards the year's World Championship of Drivers, the 1954 Indianapolis 500, was, as in the years before, not attended by the European drivers (and won for the second time by Bill Vukovich). After the cancellation of the Dutch Grand Prix at Zandvoort, the Belgian Grand Prix was the season's first championship race on European soil, held five months after the season opener.

While most of the other drivers had competed in the various non-championship races, it was the first appearance of the season in Europe for Fangio, the championship leader. Fangio had signed with the Mercedes team for the season, but since their new car was not finished in time for the Francorchamps race, he competed in the Maserati 250F as he did at his home Grand Prix. Alongside him in the Maserati team were compatriot Onofre Marimón and Italian Sergio Mantovani, while Stirling Moss, Prince Bira and Roberto Mieres entered Maseratis for private teams.

After recovering from an accident at the Mille Miglia, 1950 World Champion Giuseppe Farina returned to the field in his Ferrari 553. The team was completed by José Froilán González, and in last year's cars Maurice Trintignant and Mike Hawthorn. Jacques Swaters entered another Ferrari for his home Grand Prix.

The field was completed by the Gordini team with their drivers Jean Behra, Paul Frère and André Pilette. Although the newly formed Lancia team did make an entry for the Belgian Grand Prix, they withdrew, resulting in reigning World Champion Alberto Ascari missing another race of the season. Therefore, the field at Spa-Francorchamps only consisted of 14 drivers.

== Entries ==
| Team | No | Driver | Car | Engine | Tyre |
|---|---|---|---|---|---|
| (Belgium) Ecurie Francorchamps | 2 | (Belgium) Jacques Swaters | Ferrari 500/Ferrari 625 F1 | Ferrari 2.5 L4 | E |
| (Italy) Scuderia Ferrari | 4 | (Italy) Giuseppe Farina | Ferrari 553 Squalo/Ferrari 625 F1 | Ferrari 2.5 L4 | P |
| (Italy) Scuderia Ferrari | 6 | (Argentina) José Froilán González | Ferrari 553 Squalo/Ferrari 555 Supersqualo | Ferrari 2.5 L4 | P |
| (Italy) Scuderia Ferrari | 8 | (France) Maurice Trintignant | Ferrari 625 F1 | Ferrari 2.5 L4 | P |
| (Italy) Scuderia Ferrari | 10 | (United Kingdom) Mike Hawthorn | Ferrari 625 F1 | Ferrari 2.5 L4 | P |
| (France) Equipe Gordini | 12 | (France) Jean Behra | Gordini T16 | Gordini 2.5 L6 | E |
| (France) Equipe Gordini | 16 | (Belgium) Paul Frère | Gordini T16 | Gordini 2.0 L6 | E |
| (France) Equipe Gordini | 18 | (Belgium) André Pilette | Gordini T16 | Gordini 2.5 L6 | E |
| (Thailand) Prince Bira | 20 | (Thailand) Prince Bira | Maserati 250F | Maserati 2.5 L6 | P |
| (United Kingdom) Equipe Moss | 22 | (United Kingdom) Stirling Moss | Maserati 250F | Maserati 2.5 L6 | P |
| (Argentina) Roberto Mieres | 24 | (Argentina) Roberto Mieres | Maserati A6GCM/Maserati 250F | Maserati 2.5 L6 | P |
| (Italy) Officine Alfieri Maserati | 26 | (Argentina) Juan Manuel Fangio | Maserati 250F | Maserati 2.5 L6 | P |
| (Italy) Officine Alfieri Maserati | 28 | (Argentina) Onofre Marimón | Maserati 250F | Maserati 2.5 L6 | P |
| (Italy) Officine Alfieri Maserati | 30 | (Italy) Sergio Mantovani | Maserati 250F | Maserati 2.5 L6 | P |

== Qualifying ==
On the first day of practice only the Ferraris made an appearance. The battle for pole position became interesting, when Juan Manuel Fangio showed up on the second day. In his Maserati he managed to pulverize his own track record (set in 1951 in the Alfa Romeo 159) and qualified fastest with a time of 4:22.1, an average speed of 119.5 mph (192.3 km/h). Behind him in second place was González who was very pleased with the improved handling of his Ferrari. Over two seconds behind him was Farina who was not satisfied at all with the car's set-up.

=== Qualifying classification ===
| Pos | No | Driver | Constructor | Time | Gap |
|---|---|---|---|---|---|
| 1 | 26 | (Argentina) Juan Manuel Fangio | Maserati | 4:22.1 | — |
| 2 | 6 | (Argentina) José Froilán González | Ferrari | 4:23.6 | +1.5 |
| 3 | 4 | (Italy) Nino Farina | Ferrari | 4:26.0 | +3.9 |
| 4 | 28 | (Argentina) Onofre Marimón | Maserati | 4:27.6 | +5.5 |
| 5 | 10 | (United Kingdom) Mike Hawthorn | Ferrari | 4:29.4 | +7.3 |
| 6 | 8 | (France) Maurice Trintignant | Ferrari | 4:30.0 | +7.9 |
| 7 | 12 | (France) Jean Behra | Gordini | 4:34.5 | +12.4 |
| 8 | 18 | (Belgium) André Pilette | Gordini | 4:40.0 | +17.9 |
| 9 | 22 | (United Kingdom) Stirling Moss | Maserati | 4:40.8 | +18.7 |
| 10 | 16 | (Belgium) Paul Frère | Gordini | 4:42.0 | +19.9 |
| 11 | 30 | (Italy) Sergio Mantovani | Maserati | 4:42.0 | +19.9 |
| 12 | 24 | (Argentina) Roberto Mieres | Maserati | 4:43.8 | +21.7 |
| 13 | 20 | (Thailand) Prince Bira | Maserati | 4:46.5 | +24.4 |
| 14 | 2 | (Belgium) Jacques Swaters | Ferrari | 4:54.2 | +32.1 |

== Race ==
On 20 June 1954 the 14 cars lined up for the Belgian Grand Prix. Behind them a 15th car, the Maserati of Emmanuel de Graffenried was ready for the start to film authentic race footage for the upcoming movie The Racers starring Kirk Douglas. The start saw González take the lead in front of Farina while Fangio dropped back. During the first round the Maserati of Mieres caught on fire, but the driver was able to jump out of the moving car, getting away with only minor burns. Meanwhile, González's lead was only short lived; he had to retire after lap 1 with engine failure (as well as Swaters and two laps later Marimón). Farina led Hawthorn and Fangio, who managed to pull in front on lap 3.

On lap 10 Fangio lost the lead due to a broken visor strap that forced him into the pit. However, he quickly recovered and retook the lead. Farina had to retire with engine failure on lap 14, which left Fangio quite unchallenged with Hawthorn over a minute behind in second.

Hawthorn, who had not quite recovered from an accident at Syracuse, was slowing down during the following laps and therefore the Ferrari Team flagged him into the pits and had the car taken over by González, after a collapsed Hawthorn had to be lifted out of his car. Trintignant was therefore in second place. González soon discovered the reason for Hawthorn passing out: a broken exhaust pipe was allowing fumes in the cockpit, so the Argentine pulled into the pits to have it fixed, losing a whole lap in the process.

Meanwhile, Fangio was sitting in a comfortable lead and rode to his second victory of the season, as well as recording the fastest lap of the race. Only seven cars were able to finish. The retirements had put Trintignant in second and Moss (who scored his first podium in a World Championship race) in his privately entered Maserati in third. After his long pit stop González managed to recover and finished fourth in front of Pilette, Bira and Mantovani. For Pilette it was his first and only finish in the points of his career.

=== Race classification ===
| Pos | No | Driver | Constructor | Laps | Time/Retired | Grid | Points |
|---|---|---|---|---|---|---|---|
| 1 | 26 | (Argentina) Juan Manuel Fangio | Maserati | 36 | 2:44:42.4 | 1 | 9^{1} |
| 2 | 8 | (France) Maurice Trintignant | Ferrari | 36 | +24.2 | 6 | 6 |
| 3 | 22 | (United Kingdom) Stirling Moss | Maserati | 35 | +1 lap | 9 | 4 |
| 4 | 10 | (United Kingdom) Mike Hawthorn (Argentina) José Froilán González | Ferrari | 35 | +1 lap | 5 | 1.5; 1.5 |
| 5 | 18 | (Belgium) André Pilette | Gordini | 35 | +1 lap | 8 | 2 |
| 6 | 20 | (Thailand) Prince Bira | Maserati | 35 | +1 lap | 13 | |
| 7 | 30 | (Italy) Sergio Mantovani | Maserati | 34 | +2 laps | 11 | |
| Ret | 4 | (Italy) Nino Farina | Ferrari | 14 | Ignition | 3 | |
| Ret | 16 | (Belgium) Paul Frère | Gordini | 14 | Engine | 10 | |
| Ret | 12 | (France) Jean Behra | Gordini | 12 | Suspension | 7 | |
| Ret | 28 | (Argentina) Onofre Marimón | Maserati | 3 | Engine | 4 | |
| Ret | 6 | (Argentina) José Froilán González | Ferrari | 1 | Engine | 2 | |
| Ret | 2 | (Belgium) Jacques Swaters | Ferrari | 1 | Engine | 14 | |
| Ret | 24 | (Argentina) Roberto Mieres | Maserati | 0 | Fire | 12 | |

Notes

- ^1 – Includes 1 point for fastest lap

== Shared drive ==
- Car #10: Hawthorn (20 laps) then González (15 laps)

== Championship standings after the race ==
After his second win of the season, Juan Manuel Fangio was in a comfortable lead with 17 points. Trintignant was second with 9, while Bill Vukovich, the winner of the Indianapolis 500 was third in the championship standings (although he wouldn't compete in another World Championship race that season).

Drivers' Championship standings

| | Pos | Driver | Points |
|---|---|---|---|
| | 1 | (Argentina) Juan Manuel Fangio | 17 |
| 5 | 2 | (France) Maurice Trintignant | 9 |
| 1 | 3 | (United States) Bill Vukovich | 8 |
| 1 | 4 | (Argentina) José Froilán González | 6.5 |
| 2 | 5 | (Italy) Nino Farina | 6 |

- Note: Only the top five positions are included. Only the best 5 results counted towards the Championship.

| Previous race: 1954 Indianapolis 500 | FIA Formula One World Championship; 1954 season | Next race: 1954 French Grand Prix |
| Previous race: 1953 Belgian Grand Prix | Belgian Grand Prix | Next race: 1955 Belgian Grand Prix |
