= Écurie Francorchamps =

(Belgium) Écurie Francorchamps
- Full name: Écurie Francorchamps
- Base: Francorchamps, Stavelot, Belgium
- Founder(s): Jacques Swaters
- Noted drivers: (Belgium) Charles de Tornaco (Belgium) Roger Laurent (Belgium) Jacques Swaters

Formula One World Championship career
- First entry: 1952 Belgian Grand Prix
- Races entered: 10
- Constructors: Ferrari
- Race victories: 0
- Pole positions: 0
- Fastest laps: 0
- Final entry: 1954 Spanish Grand Prix

Écurie Francorchamps was a Belgian motor racing team. They are principally known for running privateer cars in Formula One and sports car racing during the 1950s and 1970s. The team was founded by racing driver Jacques Swaters. Between 1952 and 1954 Ecurie Francorchamps raced in Formula One, and raced in sports cars into the 1970s.

== Formula One ==
Écurie Francorchamps raced in Formula One between 1952 and 1954, and campaigned Ferrari cars. They won one race. Écurie Francorchamps made their début at the 1952 Belgian Grand Prix with Charles de Tornaco as their driver. De Tornaco finished seventh at that event, retired from the 1952 Dutch Grand Prix, and failed to qualify for the 1952 Italian Grand Prix. Roger Laurent drove the team's Ferrari in the 1952 German Grand Prix, where he finished sixth. In 1953 Swaters and de Tornaco both entered the 1953 Belgian Grand Prix but neither started the race. Swaters finished seventh in the 1953 German Grand Prix, and retired from the 1953 Swiss Grand Prix because he spun off during the first lap. In 1954 Swaters retired in Belgium because his engine failed. He finished eighth in Switzerland and failed to finish in Spain, when his engine failed again. The team's single victory came when owner Jacques Swaters won the non-Championship Avusrennen in 1953.

== Sports car racing ==
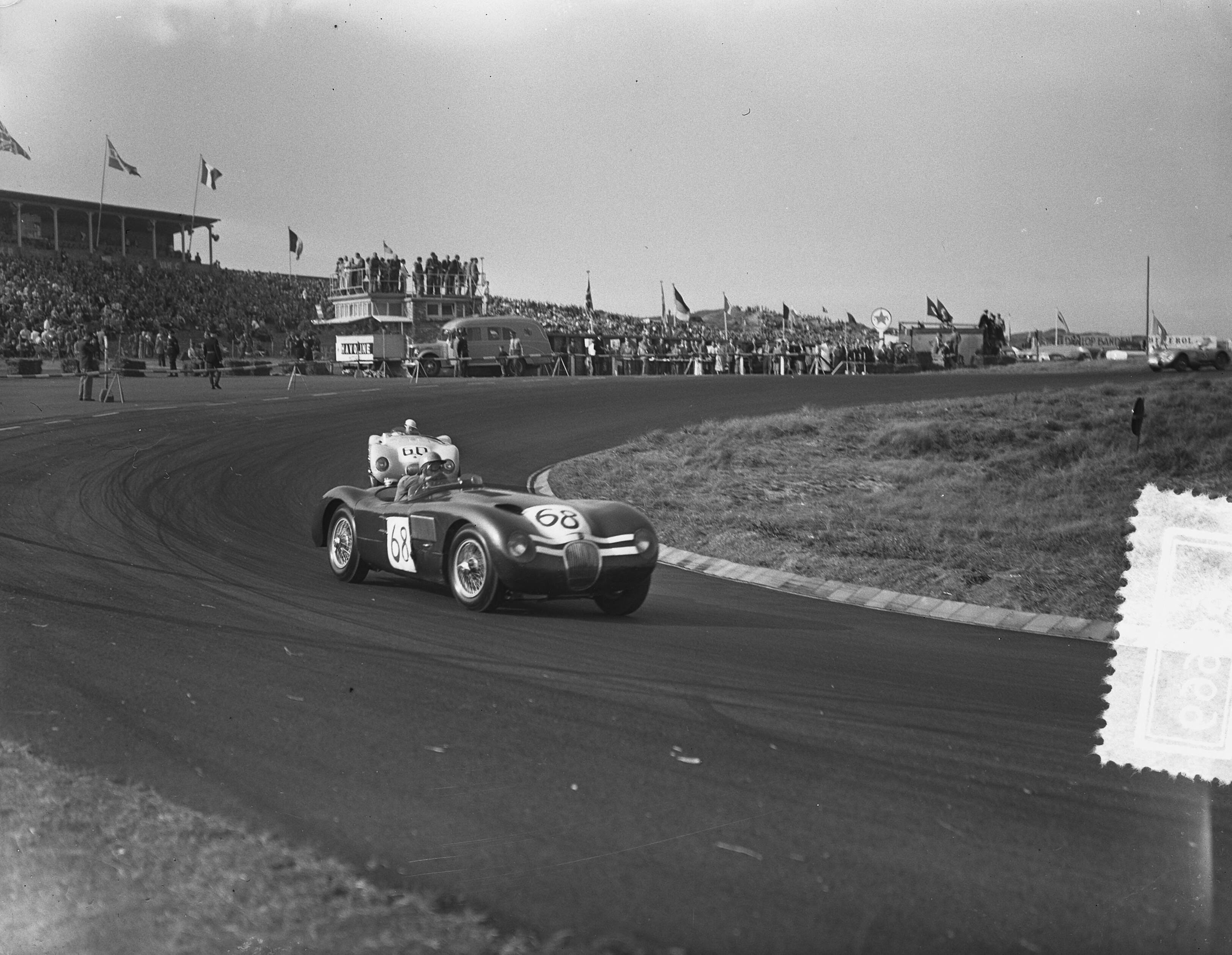
Roger Laurent in the Écurie Francorchamps Jaguar C-type car following Ninian Sanderson in Zandvoort, 1954

Écurie Francorchamps raced in sports car racing from the 1950s until the 1970s. Écurie Francorchamps first started in Le Mans in 1953 with a Jaguar C-Type finishing ninth; Charles de Tornaco and Roger Laurent were the drivers. In 1954 they finished fourth with Laurent and team owner Jacques Swaters as the drivers. Écurie Francorchamps had their best Le Mans finish in 1955 coming home in third place in a Jaguar D-Type. In 1956 Écurie Francorchamps prepared the Ferrari 250 GT Europa of Olivier Gendebien and Pierre Stasse who finished in third place of the Liège–Rome–Liège Rally. In 1957 they returned at Le Mans with Lucien Bianchi and Georges Harris finishing seventh in a Ferrari 500 TRC and winning the S2000 class. Écurie Francorchamps would keep returning in Ferraris every single time. Jean Blaton and Alain de Changy finished sixth in 1958. In 1960 Léon Dernier and Pierre Noblet finished sixth overall and third in their GT category. Lucien Bianchi and Georges Berger didn't finish in 1961. Pierre Dumay and Léon Dernier finished in a fine fourth place in 1963 also finishing second in their class. In the 1965 24 Hours of Le Mans Écurie Francorchamps finished in third place with Willy Mairesse and Jean Blaton at the wheel of a Ferrari 275 GTB, equalling their best result of 1955 and also winning their GT class. Pierre Noblet and Claude Dubois finished tenth in 1966. Écurie Francorchamps would not return to Le Mans until 1970 where Hughes de Fierlandt and Alistair Walker finished in fifth place in a Ferrari 512S. Hughes de Fierlandt and Alain de Cadenet retired in 1971.

In 1972 Derek Bell, Teddy Pilette and Richard Bond brought the Ferrari home in eighth position. The following year Richard Bond and Jean-Claude Andruet only could finish 20th. In 1974 Hughes de Fierlandt and Richard Bond retired from the race driving a Porsche 911 Carrera RSR. Jean-Claude Andruet, Teddy Pilette and Hughes de Fierlandt finished 12th in 1975. In the 1978 24 Hours of Le Mans, Écurie Francorchamps' last Le Mans, Teddy Pilette, Jean Blaton and Raymond Touroul failed to finish at the wheel of a Ferrari 512BB.

== Complete Formula One World Championship results ==
(key) (results in bold indicate pole position; results in italics indicate fastest lap)

| Year | Chassis | Engine | Tyres | Driver | 1 | 2 | 3 | 4 | 5 | 6 | 7 | 8 | 9 |
|---|---|---|---|---|---|---|---|---|---|---|---|---|---|
| 1952 | Ferrari 500 | Ferrari 500 2.0 L4 | E | | SUI | 500 | BEL | FRA | GBR | GER | NED | ITA | |
| 1952 | Ferrari 500 | Ferrari 500 2.0 L4 | E | (Belgium) Charles de Tornaco | | | 7 | | | | Ret | DNQ | |
| 1952 | Ferrari 500 | Ferrari 500 2.0 L4 | E | (Belgium) Roger Laurent | | | | | | 6 | | | |
| 1953 | Ferrari 500 | Ferrari 500 2.0 L4 | E | | ARG | 500 | NED | BEL | FRA | GBR | GER | SUI | ITA |
| 1953 | Ferrari 500 | Ferrari 500 2.0 L4 | E | (Belgium) Jacques Swaters | | | | DNS | | | 7 | Ret | |
| 1953 | Ferrari 500 | Ferrari 500 2.0 L4 | E | (Belgium) Charles de Tornaco | | | | DNS | | | | | |
| 1954 | Ferrari 500 | Ferrari 500 2.0 L4 | E | | ARG | 500 | BEL | FRA | GBR | GER | SUI | ITA | ESP |
| 1954 | Ferrari 500 | Ferrari 500 2.0 L4 | E | (Belgium) Jacques Swaters | | | Ret | | | | 8 | | Ret |
