= Jacques Swaters =

Belgian racing driver (1926–2010)

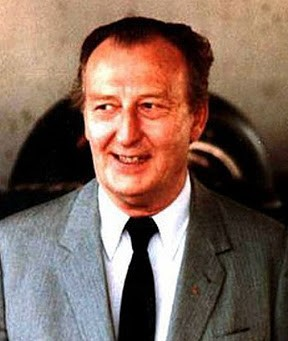
- Swaters in 1980
- Born: 30 October 1926; Woluwe-Saint-Lambert, Brussels, Belgium
- Died: 10 December 2010 (aged 84); Brussels, Belgium

Formula One World Championship career
- Nationality: (Belgium) Belgian
- Active years: 1951, 1953–1954
- Team(s): Non-works Talbot-Lago and Ferrari
- Entries: 8 (7 starts)
- Championships: 0
- Wins: 0
- Podiums: 0
- Career points: 0
- Pole positions: 0
- Fastest laps: 0
- First entry: 1951 German Grand Prix
- Last entry: 1954 Spanish Grand Prix

Jacques Swaters (Dutch pronunciation: [ʒak ˈsʋaːtərs]; 30 October 1926 – 10 December 2010) was a racing driver from Belgium and former team owner of Ecurie Belgique, Ecurie Francorchamps, and Ecurie Nationale Belge.

== Racing career ==
Swaters made his debut in the 24 Hours of Spa in an MG co-driven by his friend and racer-turned-journalist Paul Frère, entered under the Ecurie Francorchamps banner. In 1950 Swaters, Frère and André Pilette established Ecurie Belgique, a banner in which they prepared cars for themselves and other Belgian races, both in Grand Prix and sports car racing. Swaters himself raced a yellow Talbot-Lago in several events, including two World Championship rounds, the 1951 German and Italian Grands Prix.

However, in 1952, Swaters, another Belgian Charles de Tornaco and British driver Geoff Richardson, restarted Ecurie Francorchamps, a racing stable mainly associated with Ferrari. Swaters drove the team Ferrari 500 in a small number of events, but did manage to take a victory at the 1953 Avusrennen, a Formula 2 race. Richardson was signed to drive the prototype Zethrin Rennsport. As a driver, Swaters later concentrated on sports car racing, driving a Jaguar C-Type and a D-Type.

== Team manager ==
After retiring from racing in 1957, Swaters became manager of the Ecurie Nationale Belge, which had been formed in 1955 as a merger of his Francorchamps, Frère's Ecurie Belgique and Johnny Claes' Ecurie Belge. The ENB entered several Cooper-Climax cars in Formula 2 racing for both experienced and upcoming Belgian drivers, and helped launch the career of Olivier Gendebien, Lucien Bianchi and Mauro Bianchi. The team moved into F1 in 1960 and later reworked the Emeryson into the ENB chassis.

However, by 1964, Swaters was no longer interested in ENB and had turned his attention to sports car racing completely. Swaters' Ecurie Francorchamps, which had remained independent from the ENB effort during the 1950s and 1960s, was always a top contender, with occasional class wins (including the 1965 24 Hours of Le Mans) and frequent class podiums. An overall victory at the 1965 500km Spa was Swaters' crowning achievement as a manager.

The Ecurie Francorchamps stopped operating in 1982, but Swaters retained his Garage Francorchamps, a Ferrari dealership.

== Ferrari dealer and collector ==
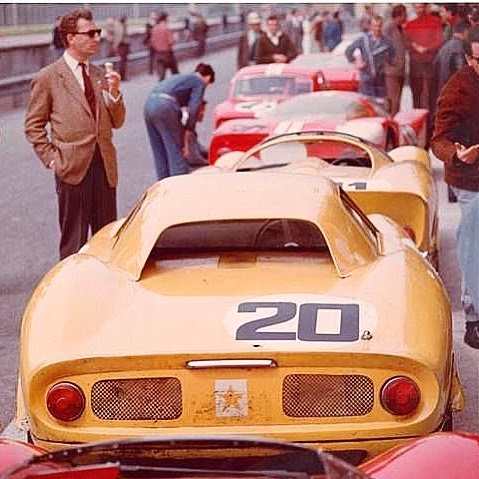
Swaters at 1000km Monza on 25 April 1966 with the 1964 Ferrari 250 LM s/n 6023 driven by Pierre Noblet and Leon Dernier

Swaters, who had bought a Ferrari 500 Formula 2 car in 1952 for his racing team, was contacted in 1953 by Ferrari to resolve a problem with the local customs authority for the car they were to display at the Brussels Motor Show and was asked to take care of the Ferrari exhibition stand as well. He managed to get the car through customs as well as making a sale at the Motor Show. As a result, he was appointed as the official Ferrari importer for the Benelux the same year. This was the beginning of a relationship that was to last over 50 years and make Swaters one of the most important Ferrari dealers as well as a major collector of everything related to the brand.

In recognition of their long standing relationship, Ferrari unveiled the Ferrari 456 to the world at the Garage Francorchamps in 1992. At the same time the "Blue Swaters" was introduced by Ferrari as a colour to celebrate 40 years of partnership Ferrari-Swaters.

During his lifetime, Swaters assembled an extensive collection for Ferrari-related material, including original documents, vintage cars, sculptures, and other automobilia. He later established the Galleria Ferrari, including one of three bronze crucifixes produced at Ferrari's foundry for the visit of the Pope to the Maranello factory, and a wooden sculpture of the Prancing Horse that had decorated Ferrari's office at the Fiorano circuit. The collection also included several rare Ferrari models, such as the four-door "Pinin" prototype, the Ferrari GTO Evoluzione, and a Ferrari California.

Swaters last appearance in the sports car world was in an Ohio Courtroom where he was defending his possession of a very rare 1954 Ferrari 375 plus chassis 0384AM that was stolen from the U.S. collector Karl Kleve in the late 1980s. Swaters said that he rightfully bought the car as a burnt out chassis in 1990, and that he and Kleve settled its ownership in 1999.

In 2008, Swaters decided to sell a large part of his collection at an auction in Maranello.

== Complete World Championship Grand Prix results ==
(key)

Year	Entrant	Chassis	Engine	1	2	3	4	5	6	7	8	9	WDC	Points
1951	Ecurie Belgique	Talbot-Lago T26C	Talbot Straight-6	SUI	500	BEL	FRA	GBR	GER; 10	ITA; Ret	ESP		NC	0
1953	Ecurie Francorchamps	Ferrari 500	Ferrari Straight-4	ARG	500	NED	BEL; DNS	FRA	GBR	GER; 7	SUI; Ret	ITA	NC	0
1954	Ecurie Francorchamps	Ferrari 500/625	Ferrari Straight-4	ARG	500	BEL; Ret	FRA	GBR	GER	SUI; 8	ITA	ESP; Ret	NC	0
1955	Ecurie Filipinetti	Gordini T16	Gordini Straight-6	ARG	MON	500	BEL; DNA	NED	GBR	ITA			NC	0

== Sources ==
- Profile at www.grandprix.com
- The Stolen Ferrari Story
- NPR – last voice interview with Swaters 2010
