= Ernst Loof =

German racing driver (1907–1956)

- Born: 4 July 1907; Neindorf, Germany
- Died: 3 March 1956 (aged 48); Bonn, West Germany

Formula One World Championship career
- Nationality: (Germany) German
- Active years: 1953
- Team: Veritas
- Entries: 1
- Championships: 0
- Wins: 0
- Podiums: 0
- Career points: 0
- Pole positions: 0
- Fastest laps: 0
- First entry: 1953 German Grand Prix

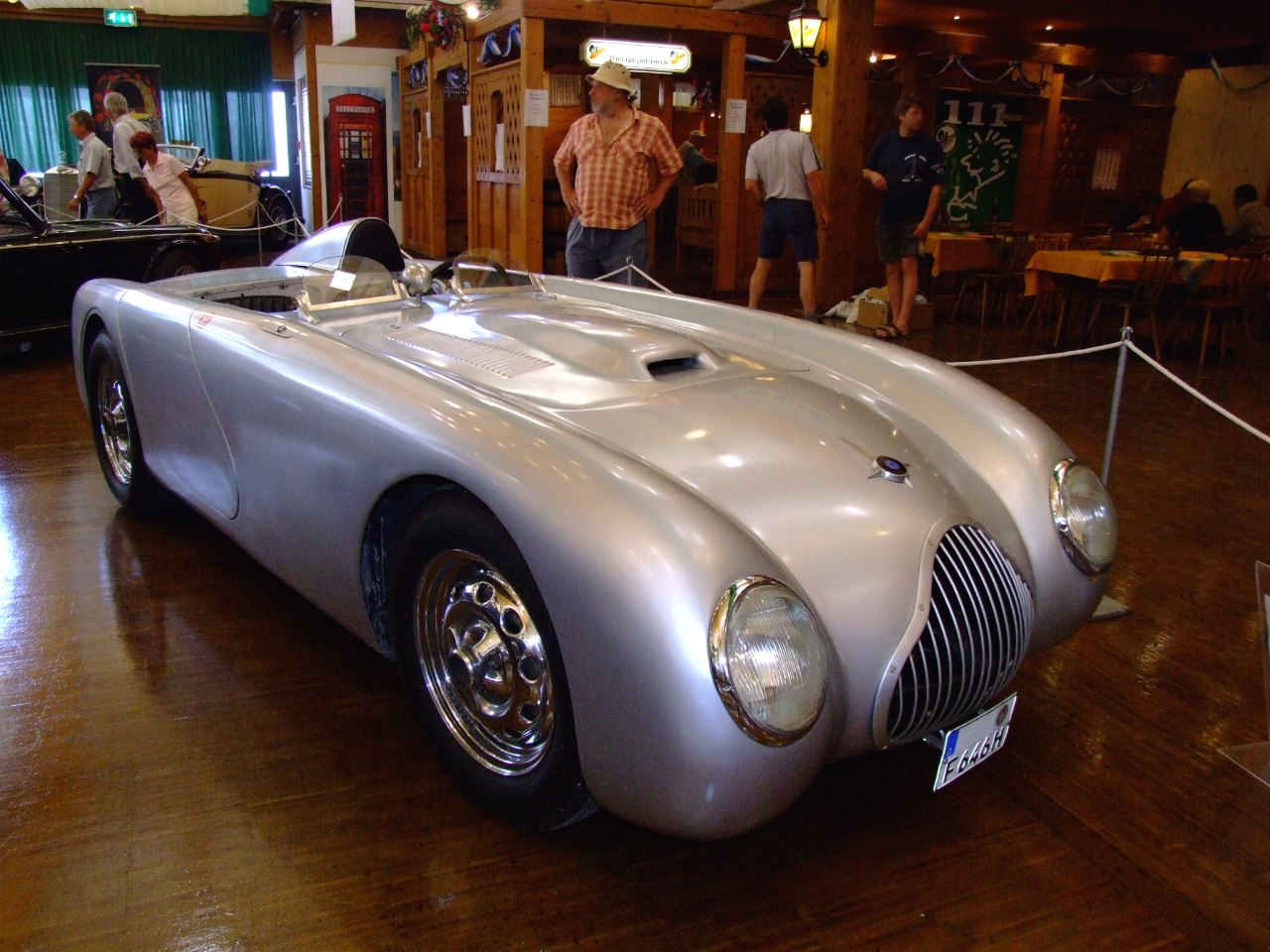
Veritas RS from 1948

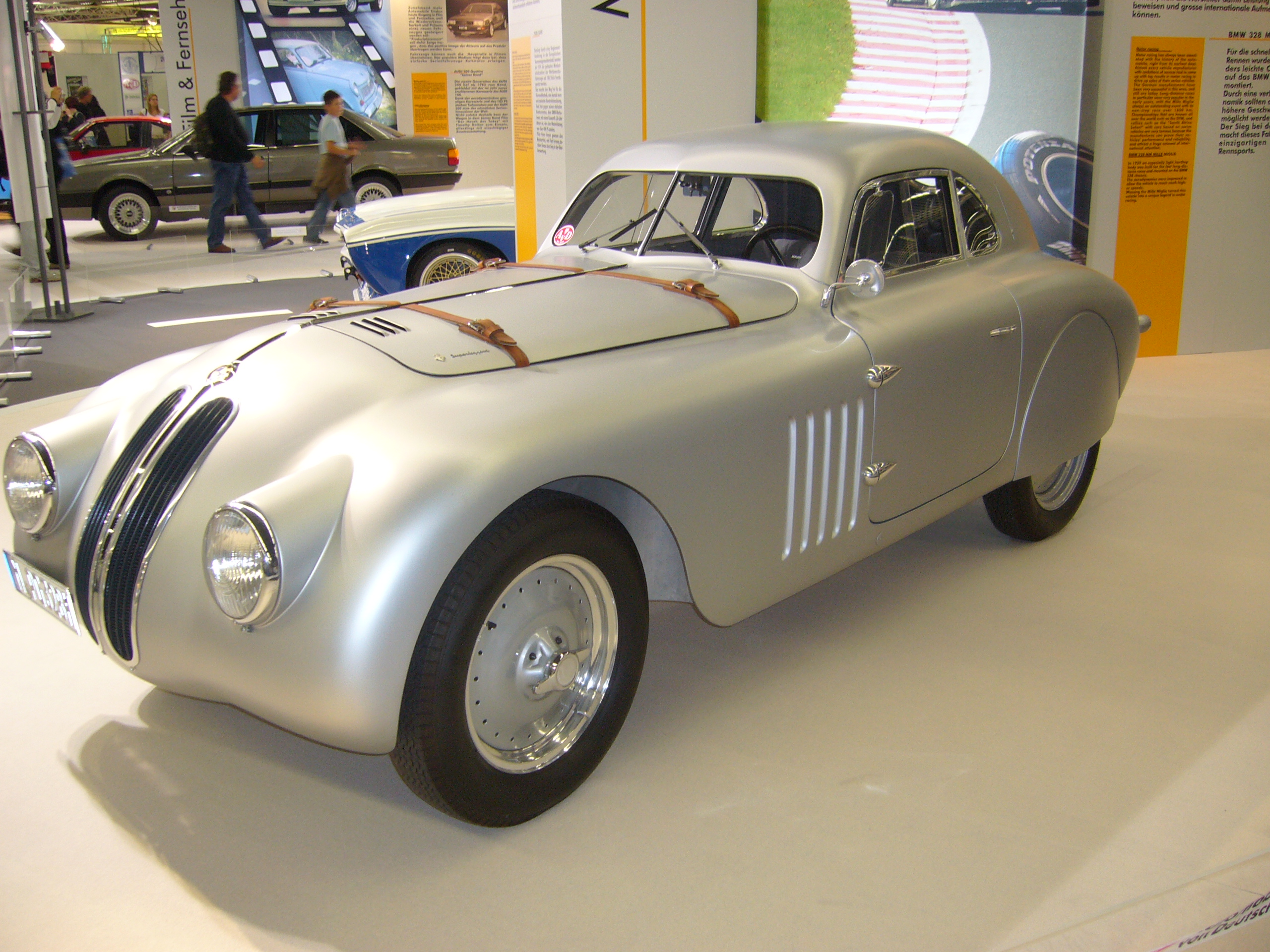
BMW 328 Mille Miglia coupé

Ernst Loof (4 July 1907 – 3 March 1956) was an automotive engineer and racing driver from Germany. He contributed to the design of the BMW 328 sports car in the late 1930s.

== Biography ==
In 1935, a rumour circulated after the 1935 Coppa Acerbo race implied that Achille Varzi was dissatisfied with the handling of the Auto Union and that he had been replaced on the Auto Union team by Loof, at the time a motorcycle racer. This rumour turned out to not be true and Loof never entered a race for Auto Union.

Loof participated in one Formula One World Championship Grand Prix, the German Grand Prix held on 2 August 1953. He retired with fuel pump failure after two metres of racing, which remains the record for the shortest Formula One career.

Loof was also a motorcycle racer and designer, and scored numerous successes in pre-war years for Imperia of Bad Godesberg and for BMW. He later became one of the founders of the Veritas company, successful in Formula Two with the Meteor racer in the immediate post-war period. The company also built sports cars, mostly BMW-engined, as well as the Panhard-engined Dyna-Veritas cabriolets.

Loof was the head designer of the Veritas car he drove in this race. The company had already gone bankrupt by this time, and its assets were purchased by BMW. He was hired by BMW in styling and body engineering and worked there until he retired due to illness.

Loof died in 1956 of a brain tumour.

== Complete World Championship results ==
(key)

Year	Entrant	Chassis	Engine	1	2	3	4	5	6	7	8	9	WDC	Points
1953	Ernst Loof	Veritas RS	Veritas Straight-6	ARG	500	NED	BEL	FRA	GBR	GER; Ret	SUI	ITA	NC	0
