= Fritz Riess =

German racing driver (1922–1991)

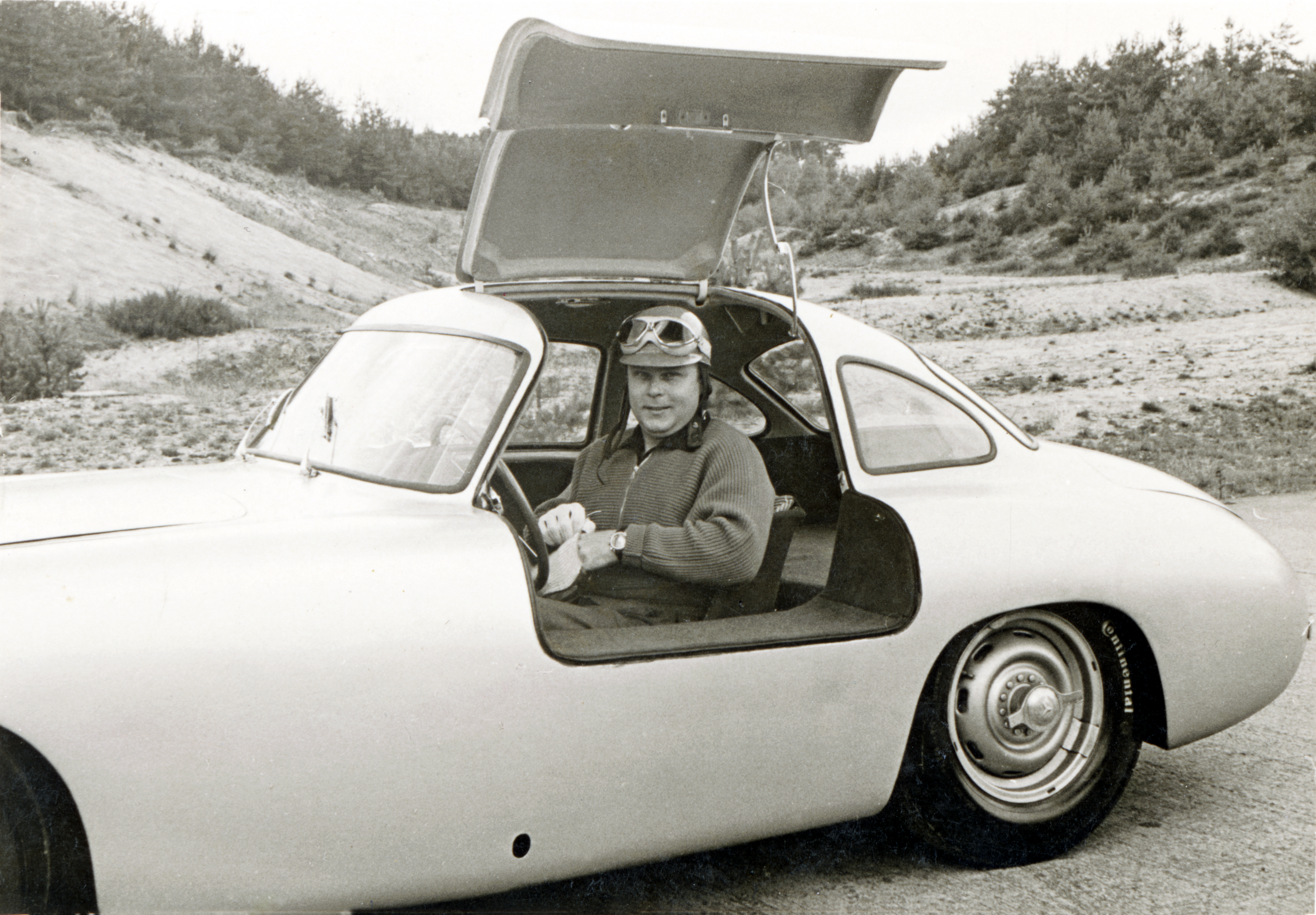
- Born: Friedrich Riess; 11 July 1922; Nuremberg, Germany
- Died: 15 May 1991 (aged 68); Samedan, Switzerland

Formula One World Championship career
- Nationality: (Germany) German
- Active years: 1952
- Team: privateer Veritas
- Entries: 1
- Championships: 0
- Wins: 0
- Podiums: 0
- Career points: 0
- Pole positions: 0
- Fastest laps: 0
- First entry: 1952 German Grand Prix

Friedrich "Fritz" Riess or Rieß (11 July 1922 – 15 May 1991)) was a racing driver from Germany. He participated in one Formula One World Championship Grand Prix, the 1952 German Grand Prix on 3 August 1952, then run to Formula Two rules. He finished seventh, scoring no championship points as only the first five finishers scored points at that time.

Riess also won the 1952 24 Hours of Le Mans for Mercedes-Benz, sharing the 300SL (W194) drive with former champion Hermann Lang. In the 1956 Mille Miglia, he finished tenth with a private Gullwing (W198).

== Racing record ==
=== Complete Formula One World Championship results ===
(key)

| Year | Entrant | Chassis | Engine | 1 | 2 | 3 | 4 | 5 | 6 | 7 | 8 | WDC | Points |
|---|---|---|---|---|---|---|---|---|---|---|---|---|---|
| 1952 | Fritz Riess | Veritas RS | Veritas Straight-6 | SUI | 500 | BEL | FRA | GBR | GER; 7 | NED | ITA | NC | 0 |

=== Complete 24 Hours of Le Mans results ===
| Year | Team | Co-Drivers | Car | Class | Laps | Pos. | Class Pos. |
|---|---|---|---|---|---|---|---|
| 1952 | (Germany) Daimler-Benz A.G. | (Germany) Hermann Lang | Mercedes-Benz W194 | S3.0 | 277 | 1st | 1st |
| 1953 | (Italy) SpA Alfa Romeo | (West Germany) Karl Kling | Alfa Romeo 6C 3000 CM | S5.0 | 133 | DNF (Transmission) | |

Sporting positions
| Preceded by Peter Walker; Peter Whitehead | Winner of the 24 Hours of Le Mans; 1952; With: Hermann Lang | Succeeded by Tony Rolt; Duncan Hamilton |
