= Willi Heeks =

German racing driver (1922–1996)

- Born: 13 February 1922; Moorlage, Lower Saxony, German Republic
- Died: 13 August 1996 (aged 74); Bocholt, North Rhine-Westphalia, Germany

Formula One World Championship career
- Nationality: (Germany) German
- Active years: 1952 - 1953
- Team(s): AFM, Veritas
- Entries: 2
- Championships: 0
- Wins: 0
- Podiums: 0
- Career points: 0
- Pole positions: 0
- Fastest laps: 0
- First entry: 1952 German Grand Prix
- Last entry: 1953 German Grand Prix

Wilhelm "Willi" Heeks (13 February 1922 – 13 August 1996) was a racing driver from Germany. He participated in two World Championship Grands Prix, debuting on 3 August 1952. He scored no championship points.

== Complete World Championship results ==
(key)

Year	Entrant	Chassis	Engine	1	2	3	4	5	6	7	8	9	WDC	Points
1952	Willi Heeks	AFM 50 (M8)	BMW	SUI	500	BEL	FRA	GBR	GER; Ret	NED	ITA		NC	0
1953	Willi Heeks	Veritas Meteor	Veritas	ARG	500	NED	BEL	FRA	GBR	GER; Ret	SUI	ITA	NC	0
