= Veritas (automobile) =

Car manufacturer

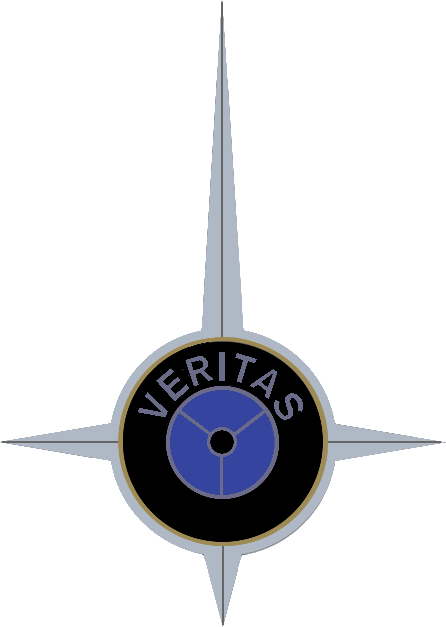

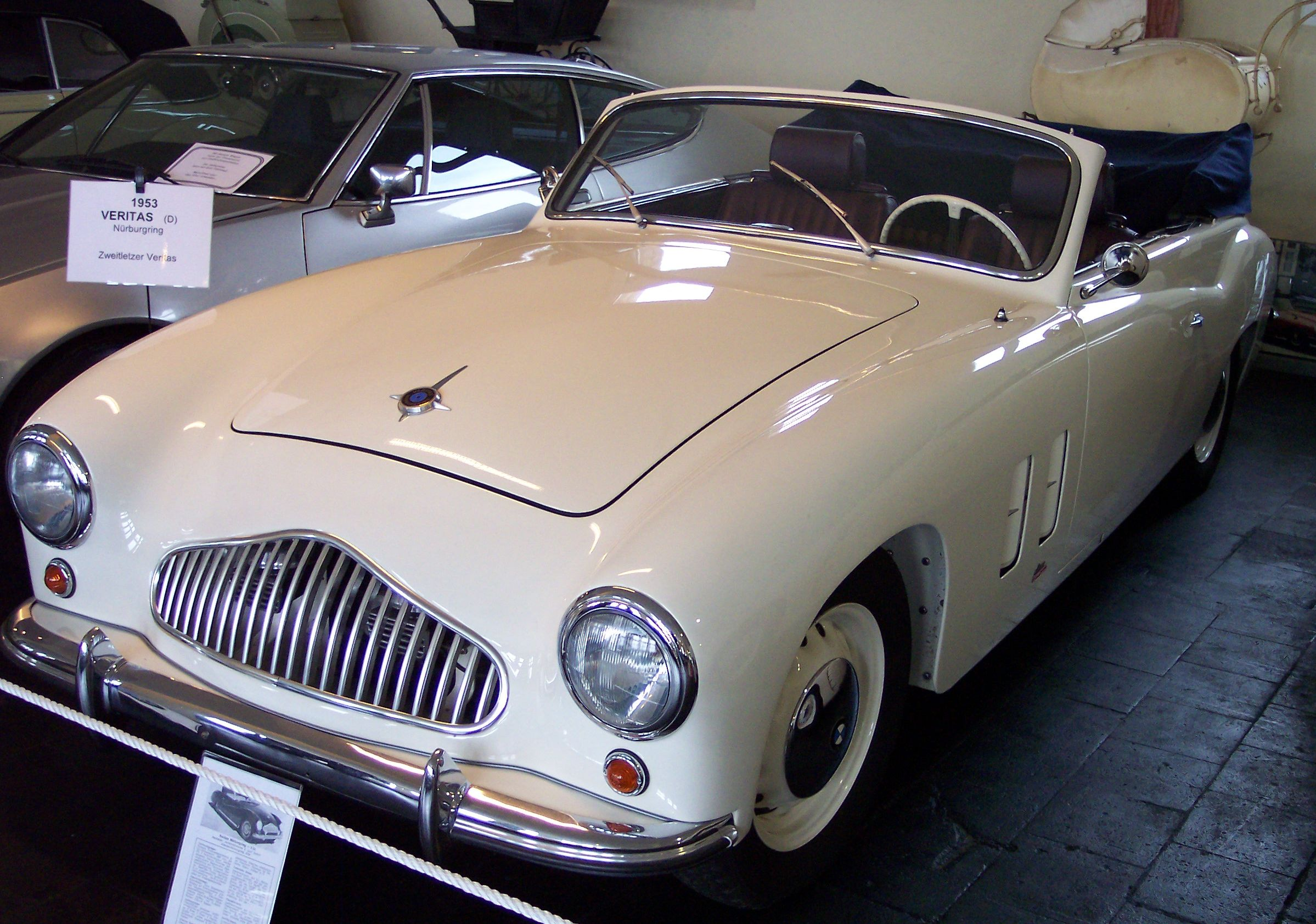
- Veritas 1953
- Industry: Automotive
- Founders: Ernst Loof, Georg Meier and Lorenz Dietrich
- Products: Automobiles

Veritas was a West German post World War II sports and race car company, located in the village of Hausen am Andelsbach, near Sigmaringen, Baden-Württemberg. It later moved to Meßkirch and Muggensturm and finally to the Nürburgring.

The company was founded by Ernst Loof, Georg Meier and Lorenz Dietrich who initially re-built and tuned pre-war BMW 328 cars using components supplied by the customer, turning them into BMW-Veritas cars. The first car was used in 1947 by Karl Kling to win at Hockenheim and subsequently become the 1947 German 2-litre champion. After only a few cars were made, following an objection from BMW, the cars became simply known as Veritas.

== Road cars ==
The first Veritas to be made for normal road use were made in 1949 with the launch of the Komet coupé which was little more than a Veritas RS made street legal. It was followed by the more civilised 2+2 Saturn coupé and Scorpion cabriolet, both being styled by Ben Bowden.

The company moved to larger premises in Muggensturm in 1949 but they were badly undercapitalised. New cars were designed using a 1998 cc engine designed Eric Zipprich and built by Heinkel. Over 200 orders were received for the new car but there was not enough money to buy the components and production came to a halt in 1950. The company continued in operation until 1952 by making new bodies for Panhard cars.

Ernst Loof moved to the Nürburgring in 1950 where he rented the old Auto Union workshops and set up a new company Automobilwerke Ernst Loof GmbH and started a new range of Veritas cars with the Heinkel manufactured engine and saloon or cabriolet coachwork by Spohn. Money quickly ran out however and the final bodies were fitted with Ford or Opel engines. The number of cars made at the Nürburgring is estimated to be between 6 and 20.

== Racing cars ==
Veritas Meteor

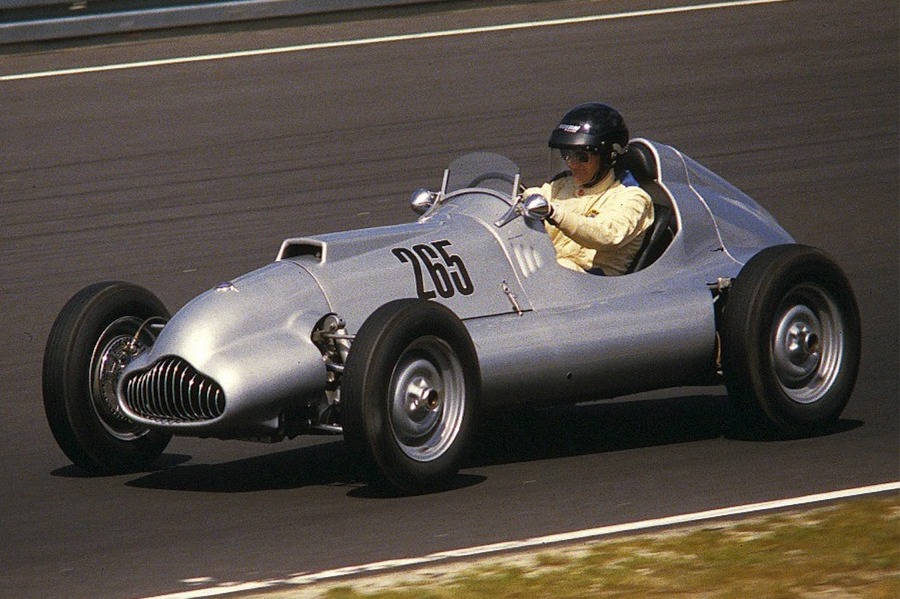
Veritas Meteor
Formula 2

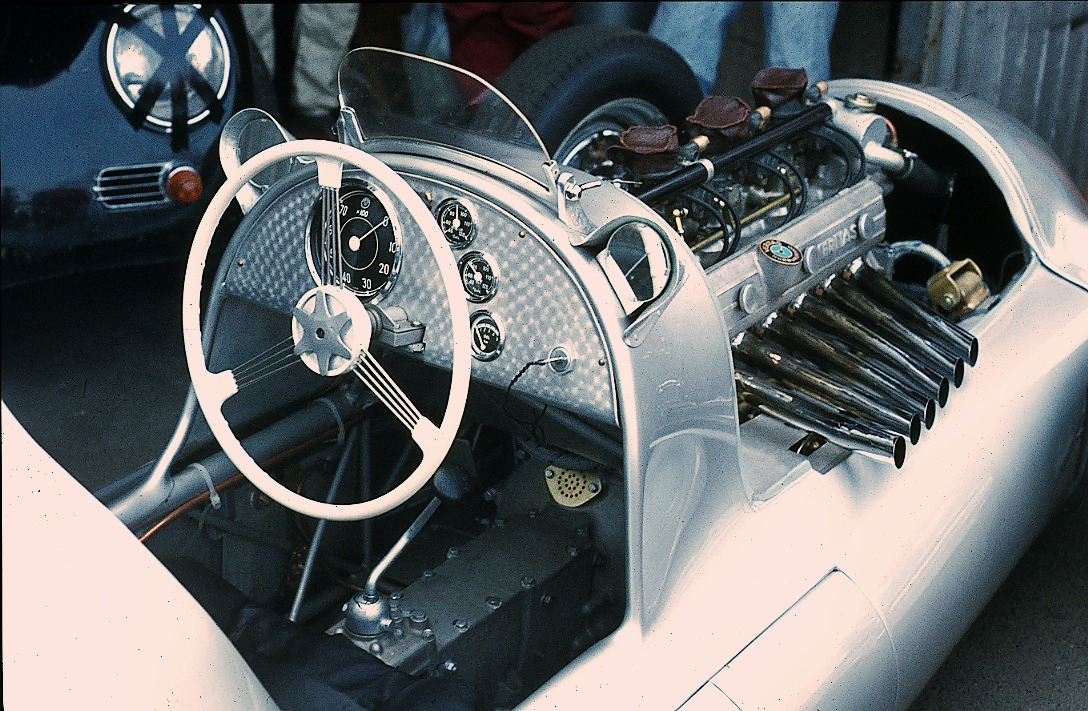
Cockpit of Veritas Meteor

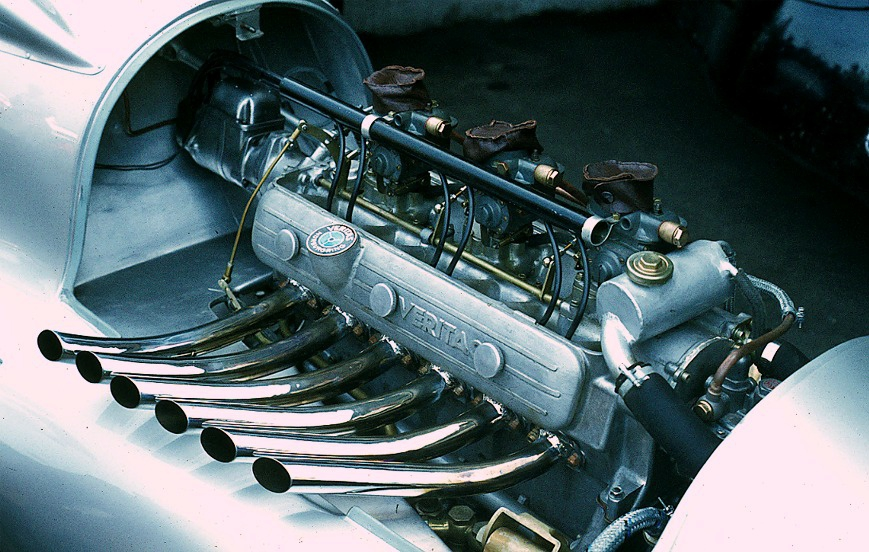
6-cyl-engine of Veritas
Other Veritas vehicles

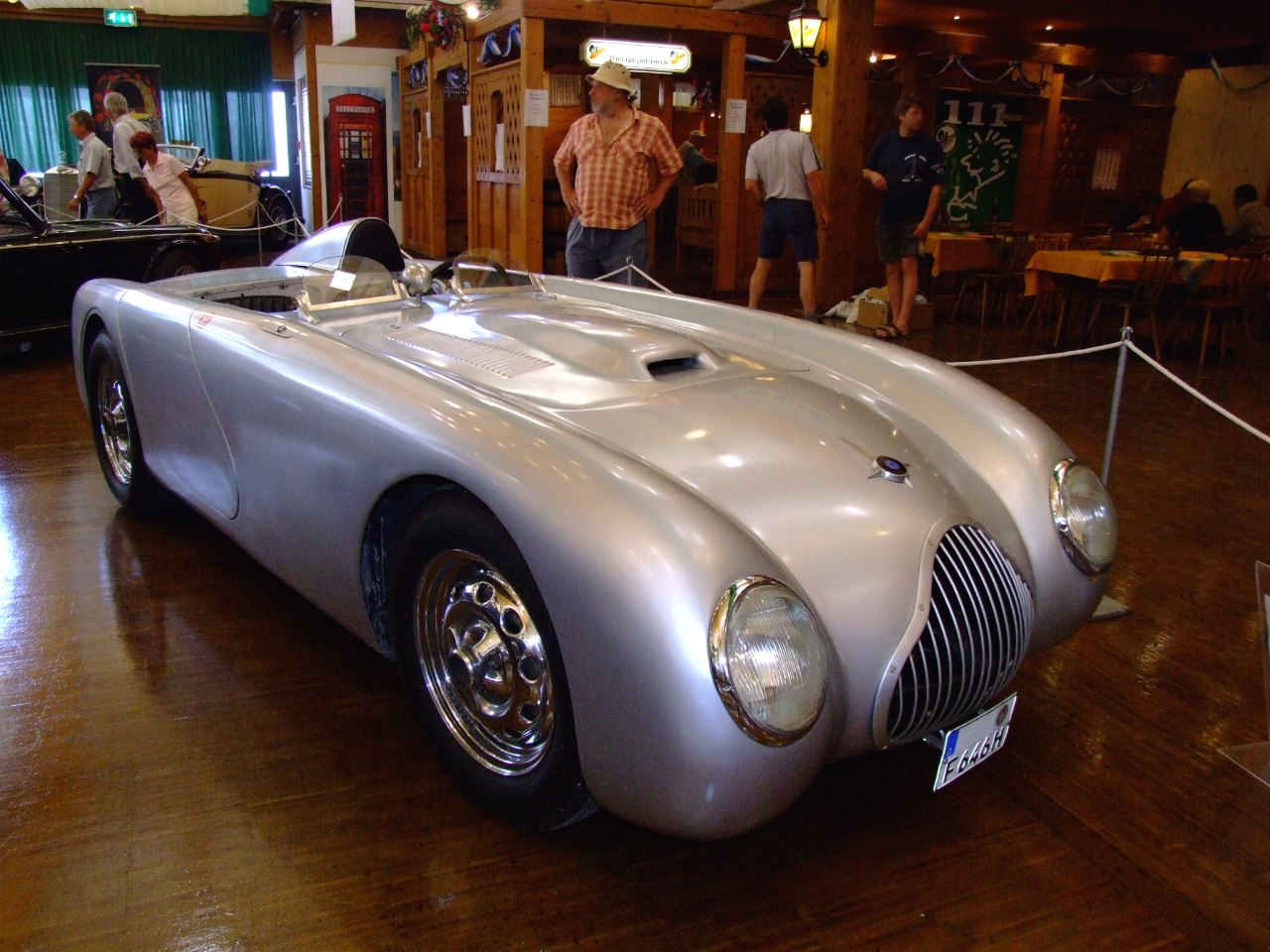
Veritas RS2000 CCM at the Concours d'Elegance

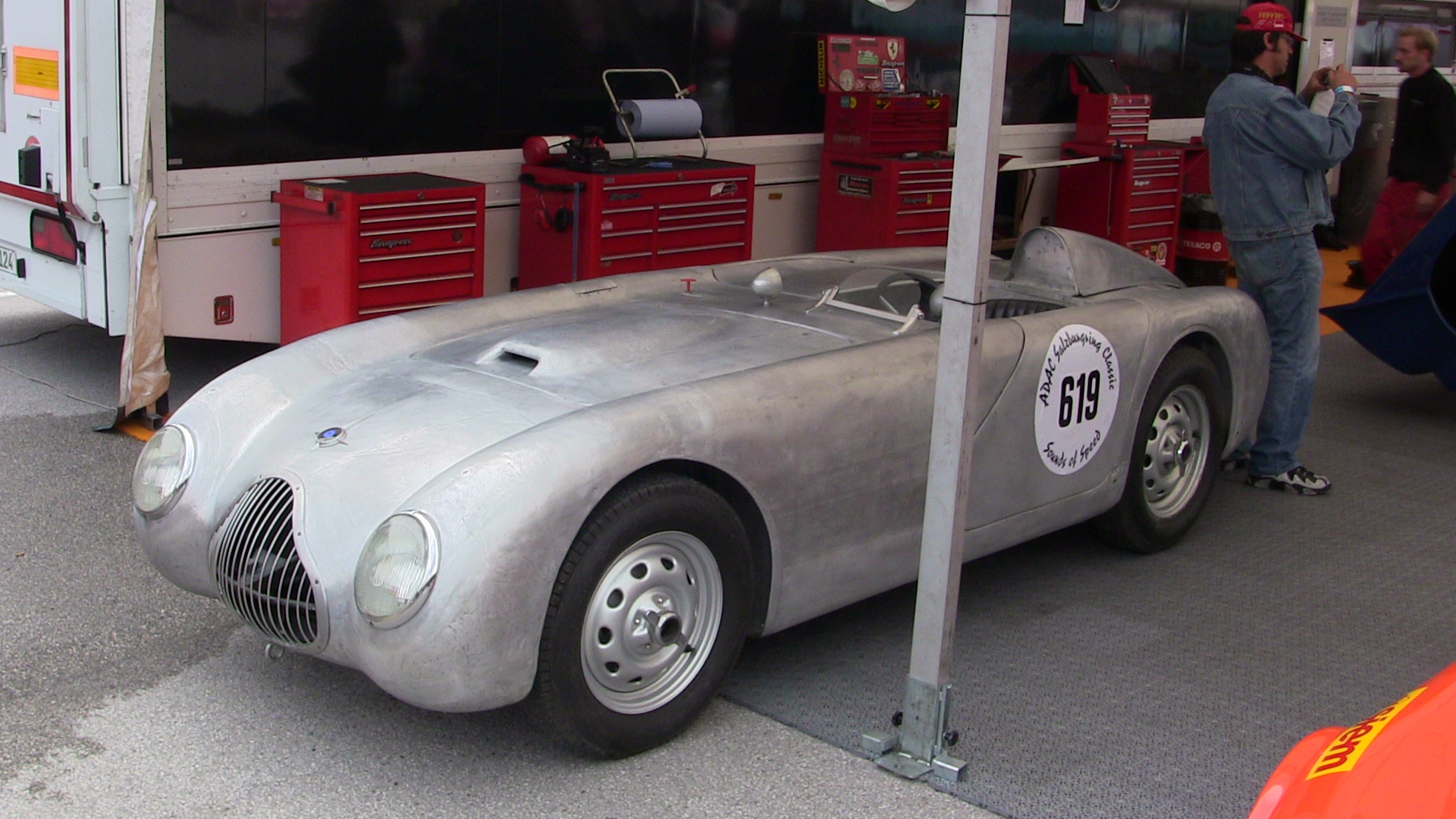
Veritas RS (1948) unpainted with the 6-cylinder-engine of the BMW 328, 1971 cm³, about 125 HP 2014 at the Salzburgring

A total of 17 privately entered Veritas cars participated in 5 FIA World Championship races.

== Later production (after 2001) ==
Veritas RS3
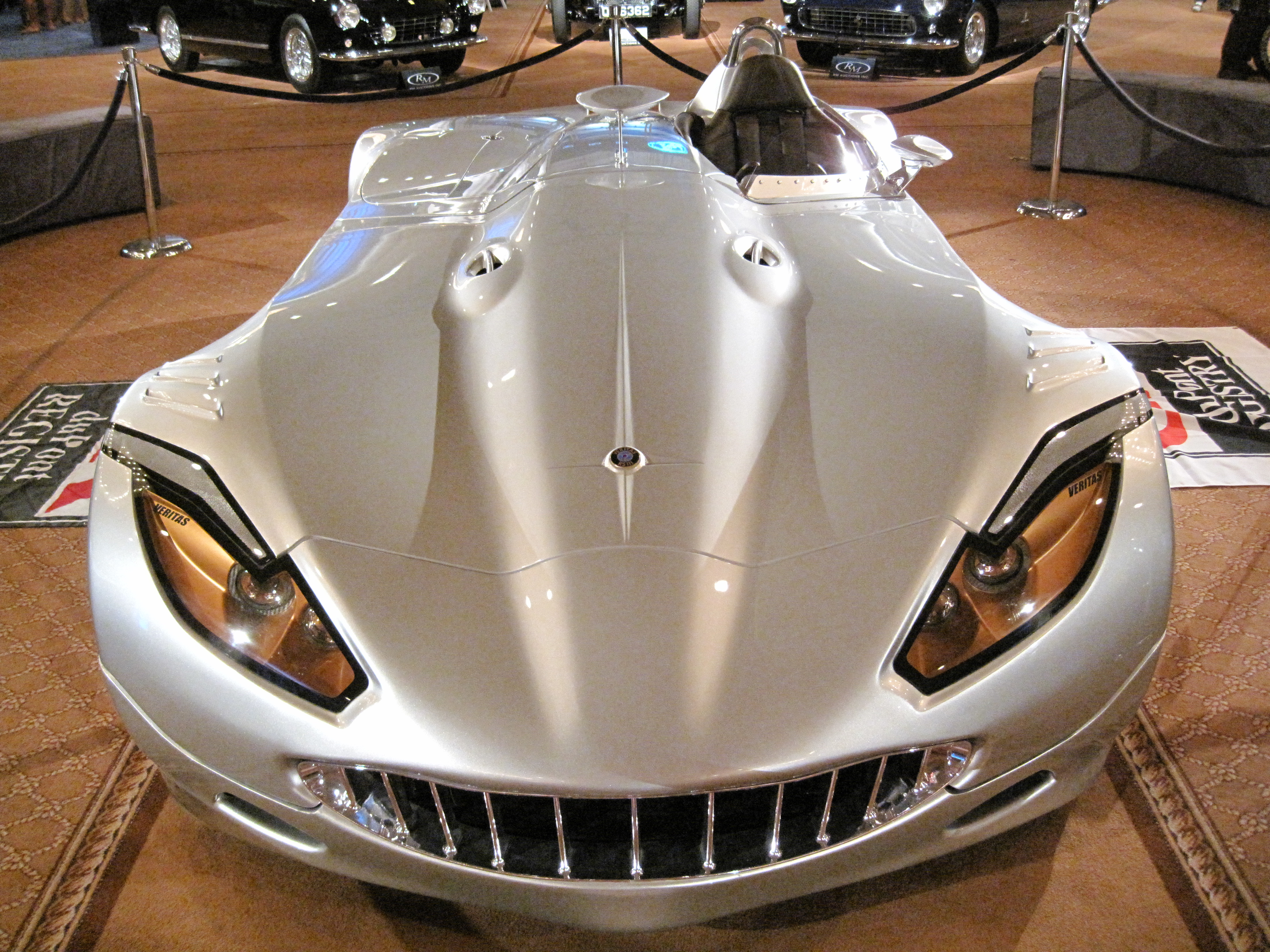

Overview
- Manufacturer: Veritas
- Production: 2009
- Assembly: Nürburg, Germany

Body and chassis
- Class: Sports car (S)
- Body style: 2-door Speedster
- Layout: FMR

Powertrain
- Engine: BMW S85B50 507 hp 5.0L V10
- Transmission: 6-speed manual, 6-speed sequential, 7-speed sequential

Dimensions
- Wheelbase: 2700 mm (106.3 in)
- Length: 4680 mm (184.3 in)
- Width: 2020 mm (79.5 in)
- Height: 970 mm (38.2 in)
- Curb weight: 1080 kg

After a virtual disappearance from motor racing and automotive engineering for nearly 50 years, a small company known as VerMot AG of Grafschaft, Rhineland planned to revive the Veritas name. It produced a concept known as the Veritas RS III in 2001, initially using a BMW sourced 6.0 litre V-12, producing 670 hp (500 kW; 679 PS). Over the following years pre-production models of the RS III were exhibited at trade shows and used as press demonstrators. The motor was changed to a 5 litre BMW unit. In 2011 VerMot announced that the RS III would be offered as a hybrid with an additional electric motor, and that a fully electric version was in planning. Various dates from 2008 onwards were announced for the start of production of the RS III, but this appears to have failed to occur and by 2014 the company was dormant.

== World Championship results ==
(key)

Year	Entrant/s	Chassis	Engine	Driver/s	1	2	3	4	5	6	7	8	9
1951					SUI	500	BEL	FRA	GBR	GER	ITA	ESP	
1951	Privateer	Meteor	Veritas Straight-6	(Switzerland) Peter Hirt	Ret								
1952					SUI	500	BEL	FRA	GBR	GER	NED	ITA	
1952	Privateers	Meteor; RS	BMW Straight-6; Veritas Straight-6	(West Germany) Toni Ulmen	Ret					8			
1952	Privateers	Meteor; RS	BMW Straight-6; Veritas Straight-6	(Belgium) Arthur Legat			NC						
1952	Privateers	Meteor; RS	BMW Straight-6; Veritas Straight-6	(West Germany) Josef Peters						Ret			
1952	Privateers	Meteor; RS	BMW Straight-6; Veritas Straight-6	(West Germany) Hans Klenk						11			
1952	Privateers	Meteor; RS	BMW Straight-6; Veritas Straight-6	(West Germany) Adolf Brudes						Ret			
1952	Privateers	Meteor; RS	BMW Straight-6; Veritas Straight-6	(West Germany) Theo Helfrich						Ret			
1952	Privateers	Meteor; RS	BMW Straight-6; Veritas Straight-6	(West Germany) Fritz Rieß						7			
1952	Motor-Presse-Verlag	Meteor	Veritas Straight-6	(West Germany) Paul Pietsch						Ret			
1953					ARG	500	NED	BEL	FRA	GBR	GER	SUI	ITA
1953	Privateers	Meteor; RS	Veritas Straight-6	(Belgium) Arthur Legat				Ret					
1953	Privateers	Meteor; RS	Veritas Straight-6	(West Germany) Erwin Bauer							Ret		
1953	Privateers	Meteor; RS	Veritas Straight-6	(West Germany) Ernst Loof							Ret		
1953	Privateers	Meteor; RS	Veritas Straight-6	(West Germany) Oswald Karch							Ret		
1953	Privateers	Meteor; RS	Veritas Straight-6	(West Germany) Willi Heeks							Ret		
1953	Privateers	Meteor; RS	Veritas Straight-6	(West Germany) Theo Helfrich							12		
1953	Privateers	Meteor; RS	Veritas Straight-6	(West Germany) Wolfgang Seidel							16		
1953	Hans Klenk	Meteor	Veritas Straight-6	(West Germany) Hans Herrmann							9		
