= Hans Klenk =

German racing driver (1919–2009)

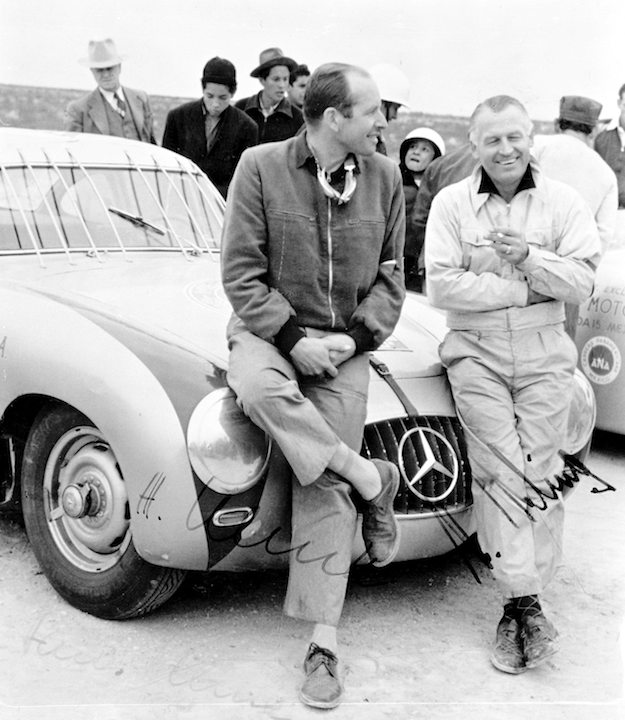
- Born: 28 October 1919; Künzelsau, Germany
- Died: 24 March 2009 (aged 89); Vellberg, Germany

Formula One World Championship career
- Nationality: (Germany) German
- Active years: 1952
- Team: privateer Veritas
- Entries: 1
- Championships: 0
- Wins: 0
- Podiums: 0
- Career points: 0
- Pole positions: 0
- Fastest laps: 0
- First entry: 1952 German Grand Prix

Hans Klenk (28 October 1919 – 24 March 2009) was a racing driver from Germany. He participated in one World Championship Grand Prix on 3 August 1952 and did not score any championship points. Klenk won the 1952 edition of La Carrera Panamericana in a Mercedes Benz W194, along with Karl Kling.

== Complete World Drivers' Championship results ==
(key)

Year	Entrant	Chassis	Engine	1	2	3	4	5	6	7	8	9	WDC	Points
1952	Hans Klenk	Veritas Meteor	Veritas S6	SUI	500	BEL	FRA	GBR	GER; 11	NED	ITA		NC	0
1953	Hans Klenk	Veritas Meteor	Veritas S6	ARG	500	NED	BEL	FRA	GBR	GER; DNA	SUI	ITA	NC	0
