= Ludwig Fischer (racing driver) =

German racing driver (1915–1991)

- Born: 17 December 1915; Straubing, Lower Bavaria, Germany
- Died: 8 March 1991 (aged 75); Bad Reichenhall, Upper Bavaria, Germany

Formula One World Championship career
- Nationality: (Germany) German
- Active years: 1952
- Team: non-works AFM
- Entries: 1 (0 starts)
- Championships: 0
- Wins: 0
- Podiums: 0
- Career points: 0
- Pole positions: 0
- Fastest laps: 0
- First entry: 1952 German Grand Prix

Ludwig Fischer (17 December 1915 – 8 March 1991) was a racing driver from Germany, who raced throughout the 1950s and into the early 1960s, mainly in German Formula Two, but also in hillclimbing and Formula Junior.

Fischer began his career in 1950 in hillclimbs before competing in sports cars and endurance racing. He also took part in several Formula Two races in an AFM-BMW, with little success. Prior to his racing career, he had served a prison sentence for breaking trade and customs laws.

Fischer's single World Championship Formula One entry was at the 1952 German Grand Prix in the AFM, where he qualified 31st of the 32 entrants. However, the organisers considered that three drivers had not demonstrated a sufficient level of competence to be allowed to start the race, with Fischer among them (the other two being Willi Krakau and Harry Merkel).

Fischer continued racing in 1953 but his licence was suspended after an altercation with B Bira during a race at Chimay in Belgium. He had raced without the permission of the ONS, which suspended his licence until after that year's German Grand Prix.

He continued his career at a lower level into the 1960s, attracting further suspensions, and retired in 1964. He wrote an autobiography in 1966.

== Complete Formula One World Championship results ==
(key)

Year	Entrant	Chassis	Engine	1	2	3	4	5	6	7	8	WDC	Points
1952	Ludwig Fischer	AFM	BMW Straight-6	SUI	500	BEL	FRA	GBR	GER; DNS	NED	ITA	NC	0
