= Adolf Brudes =

German racing driver (1899–1986)

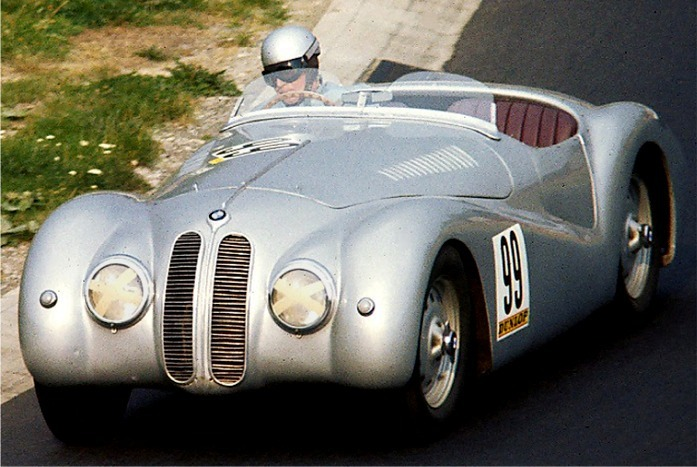
- Adolf Brudes in a BMW 328 "Mille Miglia" at Nürburgring in 1976.
- Born: Adolf Brudes von Breslau; 15 October 1899; Groß Kottulin, German Empire
- Died: 5 November 1986 (aged 87); Bremen, West Germany

Formula One World Championship career
- Nationality: (Germany) German
- Active years: 1952
- Team: privateer Veritas
- Entries: 1
- Championships: 0
- Wins: 0
- Podiums: 0
- Career points: 0
- Pole positions: 0
- Fastest laps: 0
- First entry: 1952 German Grand Prix
24 Hours of Le Mans career
- Years: 1953
- Teams: Borgward GmbH
- Best finish: DNF (1953)

Adolf Brudes von Breslau (15 October 1899 – 5 November 1986) was a Formula One driver from Germany and a member of German nobility. He started racing motorcycles in 1919. As an owner of a BMW and Auto Union dealership in Breslau, he had the opportunities to go racing, which he did from 1928 onwards, initially in hillclimbs. After World War II wiped out his business, he moved to Berlin and for a while became a mechanic, wherever he could find jobs. However he soon was back racing, and he continued until 1968, in hillclimbs (a career of 49 years). He participated in one World Championship Grand Prix, the 1952 Großer Preis von Deutschland, but scored no championship points. He also participated in several non-Championship Formula One races.

== Pre-war career ==
Brudes was born in Kotulin, near Breslau. Today, Breslau is known as Wrocław, and is in Poland. Back in 1899, it was part of the German Reich.

Brudes began his racing career on two wheels as early as 1919. Between 1924 and 1927, he was the master mechanic and works rider for motorcycle manufacturer Victoria. In 1925, the company added a Root blower to their 2-cylinder ohv 597cc flat engine. A year later, Brudes set a Land Speed Record of 102½ mph (165 km/h), riding one of these bikes.

Brudes wished to race at a higher level, and with that in mind, he started racing cars alongside the bikes in 1928. He purchased a Bugatti Type 37A with which he went hillclimbing mostly in Poland, taking a number of overall and class victories. Meanwhile, he established a BMW and Auto Union dealership in Breslau. By 1934, he had added a Bugatti Type 35B and a MG C-type to his stable, and it was with the MG, he scored a class victory in the 1934 Eifelrennen at the Nürburgring.

1936 saw Brudes take part on an Auto Union driver evaluation test, but the driver when to another driver. Not to be put off by this set back, he acquired a BMW 328. After some excellent results, he earns himself place in their works squad of the 1938 Spa 24 Hours race. Partnered by Paul Heinemann, the finish fourth overall, second in class. Also would also go on to record a podium finish in the 1940 Mille Miglia. The race ran over a shortened course, under the title of Gran Premio Bescia delle Mille Miglia. Brudes was paired with Ralph Röese in a BMW 328 spider, finished third.

== Post-war career ==
With the outbreak, naturally racing stopped. Once the war ended, Brudes' situation was much changed and by 1945, he had lost everything. His family were forced to move to Sedlitz, a small town in east of Germany where his brothers lived. After numerous odd jobs, he moved to Berlin looking for work. He found work at the BMW dealer in Halensee, when he was introduced to an American officer who was interested in racing, Alexander Orley. Brudes was employed to prepared BMW coupés for Orley to race.

When Brudes resuming his own racing career, it was driving one of Orley's BMW Orley Speciale, based upon the Vertias-Meteor. It was in this car, he took part in his only World Championship Grand Prix, 1952 Großer Preis von Deutschland. His race latest only 5 laps behind him retired with engine problems. A few years earlier, he received an invitation from August Momberger to drive the new Borgward sports cars, in a number of record attempts. In October 1953, in a very streamlined 1500cc sports car with lightweight twin tube chassis, he set a number of speed and endurance records at L'autodrome de Linas-Monthlhéry. During the season of 1953, he was finally given a contract by Borgward and became an official works driver. When the team took their steps into international motorsport, Brudes was amongst the squad of drivers. Their first event was the 24 Heures du Mans, with a trio of Borgward-Hansa 1500 Rennsport Coupés. Brudes's car would run out of fuel just after three hours of racing.

Brudes would continue to race until 1968, when he made his last competitive appearance on the Taunus Hillclimb, where in an Alfa Romeo Giulia, he finished third in class.

== Racing record ==
=== Career highlights ===
| Season | Series | Position | Team | Car |
|---|---|---|---|---|
| 1928 | Lückendorf Hillclimb | 1st | | BMW Motorrad |
| 1929 | Grand Prix Polski | 1st | | BMW Motorrad |
| 1930 | Isergebirgsrennen Hillclimb | 1st | | Bugatti Type 37A |
| | Riesengebrige Hillclimb | 1st | | Bugatti Type 37A |
| | ADAC Eifelrennen | 3rd | A. Brudes | Bugatti Type 37A |
| 1931 | Isergebirgsrennen Hillclimb | 1st | | Bugatti Type 37A |
| 1935 | Hochwaldstrasse (Bad Salxbrunn) | 1st | | Bugatti Type 35B |
| 1937 | Riesengebrige Hillclimb | 1st | | BMW 328 |
| | Hohensyburger Hillclimb | 1st | | BMW 328 |
| | Großer Bergpreis v. Deutchsland Schauinsland | 2nd | | BMW 328 |
| 1940 | Gran Premio Bescia delle Mille Miglia | 3rd | BMW Werke | BMW 328 spider |
| 1949 | Sachsenringrennen | 1st | SAG Awtowelo, Werk BMW Eisenach | BMW Intertyp |
| 1953 | Internationales ADAC-Eifel-Rennen Nürburgring [S1.5] | 2nd | Borgward | Borgward Hansa 1500 RS |
| | Internationales ADAC-1000 km Rennen Weltmeisterschaftslauf Nürburgring | 3rd | Borgward GmbH | Borgward Hansa 1500 RS |

=== Complete Formula One World Championship results ===
(key)

| Year | Entrant | Chassis | Engine | 1 | 2 | 3 | 4 | 5 | 6 | 7 | 8 | WDC | Points |
|---|---|---|---|---|---|---|---|---|---|---|---|---|---|
| 1952 | Adolf Brudes | Veritas RS | BMW Straight-6 | SUI | 500 | BEL | FRA | GBR | GER; Ret | NED | ITA | NC | 0 |

=== Complete 24 Hours of Le Mans results ===
| Year | Team | Co-Drivers | Car | Class | Laps | Pos. | Class Pos. |
|---|---|---|---|---|---|---|---|
| 1953 | (West Germany) Borgward GmbH | (West Germany) Hans-Hugo Hartmann | Borgward Hansa 1500 RS | S1.5 | 29 | DNF; Out of fuel | |

=== Complete Mille Miglia results ===
| Year | Team | Co-Drivers | Car | Class | Pos. | Class Pos. |
|---|---|---|---|---|---|---|
| 1940 | (Germany) BMW Werke | (Germany) Ralph Röese | BMW 328 spider | 2.0 | 3rd | 2nd |

=== Complete 24 Hours of Spa results ===
| Year | Team | Co-Drivers | Car | Class | Laps | Pos. | Class Pos. |
|---|---|---|---|---|---|---|---|
| 1938 | (Germany) BMW Werke | (Germany) Paul Heinemann | BMW 328 | 2.0 | 180 | 4th | 2nd |

=== Complete Carrera Panamericana results ===
| Year | Team | Co-Drivers | Car | Class | Pos. | Class Pos. |
|---|---|---|---|---|---|---|
| 1953 | (West Germany) Adolf Brudes | | Borgward Hansa 1500 RS | S1.6 | DNF; Accident | |
| 1954 | (West Germany) Carl Borgward | (West Germany) Erick Bock | Borgward Isabella | TE1.9 | 74th | 6th |
