= Harry Merkel =

German racing driver (1918–1995)

- Born: 10 January 1918; Taucha, Saxony, Germany
- Died: 11 February 1995 (aged 77); Killarney Vale, New South Wales, Australia

Formula One World Championship career
- Nationality: (Germany) German
- Active years: 1952
- Team: non-works BMW
- Entries: 1 (0 starts)
- Championships: 0
- Wins: 0
- Podiums: 0
- Career points: 0
- Pole positions: 0
- Fastest laps: 0
- First entry: 1952 German Grand Prix

Harry Erich Merkel (10 January 1918 – 11 February 1995) was a German racing driver. His single entry to a World Championship Grand Prix was at the 1952 German Grand Prix, sharing one of Willi Krakau's cars, a BMW-Eigenbau. He did not qualify, failing to set a time.

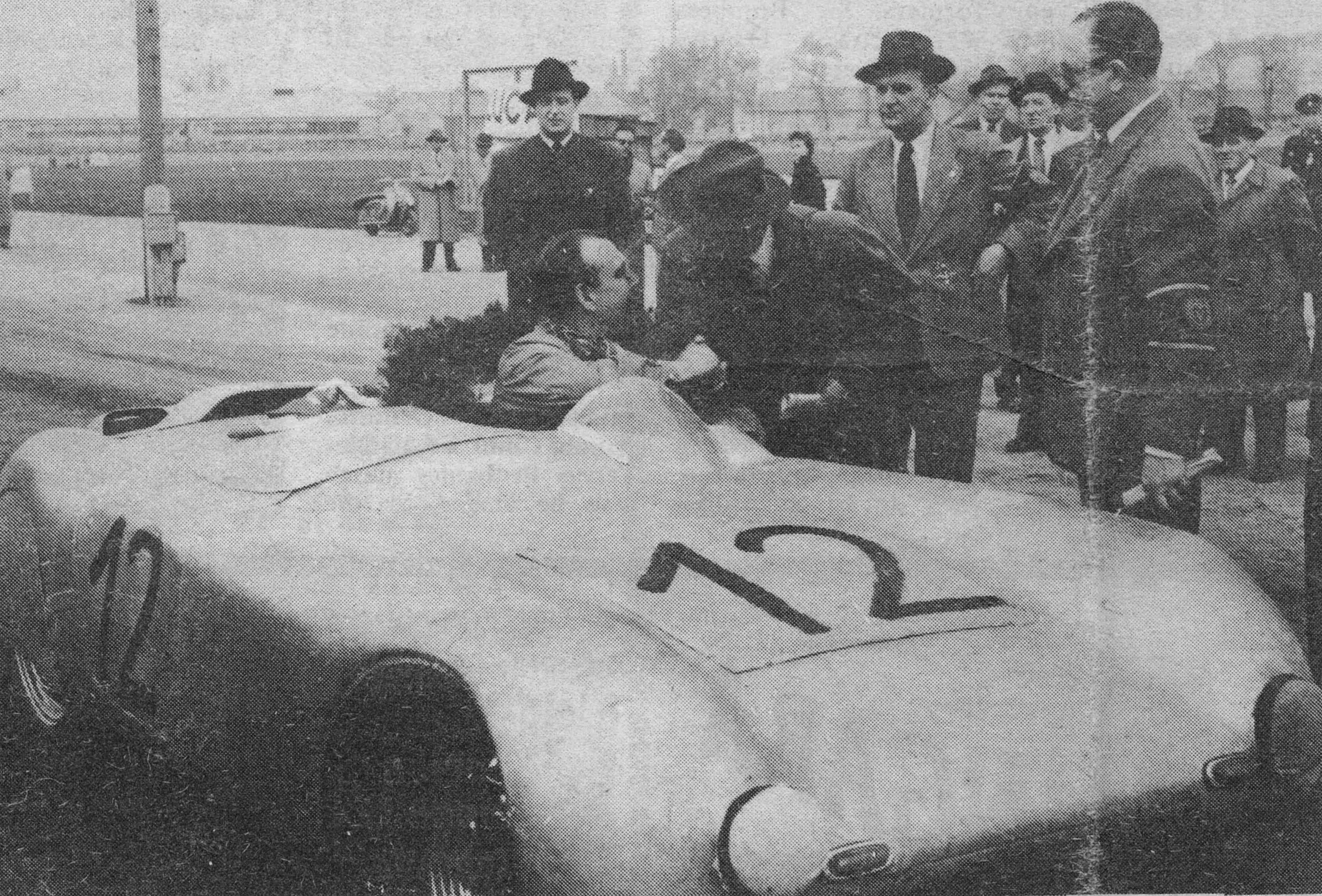
Merkel in a Porsche Spyder Rometsch in 1954

== Complete Formula One World Championship results ==
(key)

Year	Entrant	Chassis	Engine	1	2	3	4	5	6	7	8	WDC	Points
1952	Willi Krakau	Krakau Eigenbau	BMW 328 2.0 L6	SUI	500	BEL	FRA	GBR	GER; DNS	NED	ITA	NC	0
