= Helmut Niedermayr =

German racing driver (1915–1985)

- Born: 29 November 1915; Munich, Germany
- Died: 3 April 1985 (aged 69); Christiansted, Saint Croix, United States Virgin Islands

Formula One World Championship career
- Nationality: (Germany) German
- Active years: 1952
- Team: privateer AFM
- Entries: 1
- Championships: 0
- Wins: 0
- Podiums: 0
- Career points: 0
- Pole positions: 0
- Fastest laps: 0
- First entry: 1952 German Grand Prix

Helmut Niedermayr (29 November 1915 – 3 April 1985) was a racing driver from Germany. He participated in one World Championship Grand Prix, on 3 August 1952, scoring no championship points.

Niedermayr finished second with Theo Helfrich at the 1952 24 Hours of Le Mans, but a few weeks later he crashed into the crowd during a race at the Grenzlandring, killing at least 13 spectators and injuring 42.

== Complete Formula One World Championship results ==
(key)

Year	Entrant	Chassis	Engine	1	2	3	4	5	6	7	8	WDC	Points
1952	Helmut Niedermayr	AFM 6	BMW Straight-6	SUI	500	BEL	FRA	GBR	GER; 9	NED	ITA	NC	0

== 24 Hours of Le Mans results ==
Year	Team	Co-Drivers	Car	Class	Laps	Pos.	Class Pos.
1952	(Germany) Daimler-Benz A.G.	(Germany) Theo Helfrich	Mercedes-Benz W194	S 3.0	276	2nd	2nd
