= Günther Bechem =

German racing driver (1921–2011)

Karl-Günther Bechem
- Born: 21 December 1921
- Died: 3 May 2011 (aged 89)

Formula One World Championship career
- Nationality: (Germany) German
- Active years: 1952–1953
- Team(s): non-works BMW, non-works AFM
- Entries: 2
- Championships: 0
- Wins: 0
- Podiums: 0
- Career points: 0
- Pole positions: 0
- Fastest laps: 0
- First entry: 1952 German Grand Prix
- Last entry: 1953 German Grand Prix

Karl-Günther Bechem (German pronunciation: [kaʁl ˈɡʏntɐ ˈbɛçəm]; alias: "Bernhard Nacke"; 21 December 1921 – 3 May 2011) was a racing driver from Germany.

Bechem started out in sports car racing before competing in Formula Two in the 1952 German Grand Prix, driving a BMW under the alias "Bernhard Nacke". He failed to finish the race, and so did not score any World Championship points. He continued driving an ex-Karl Gommann AFM-BMW (chassis 50–5) in Formula Two in 1953, at AVUS and then in the German Grand Prix at Nürburgring, again failing to finish. He was more successful in sports car racing with the Borgward team.

In 1954, Bechem crashed heavily while competing in the Carrera Panamericana, and although he recovered fully from his injuries, he never raced again at this high level.

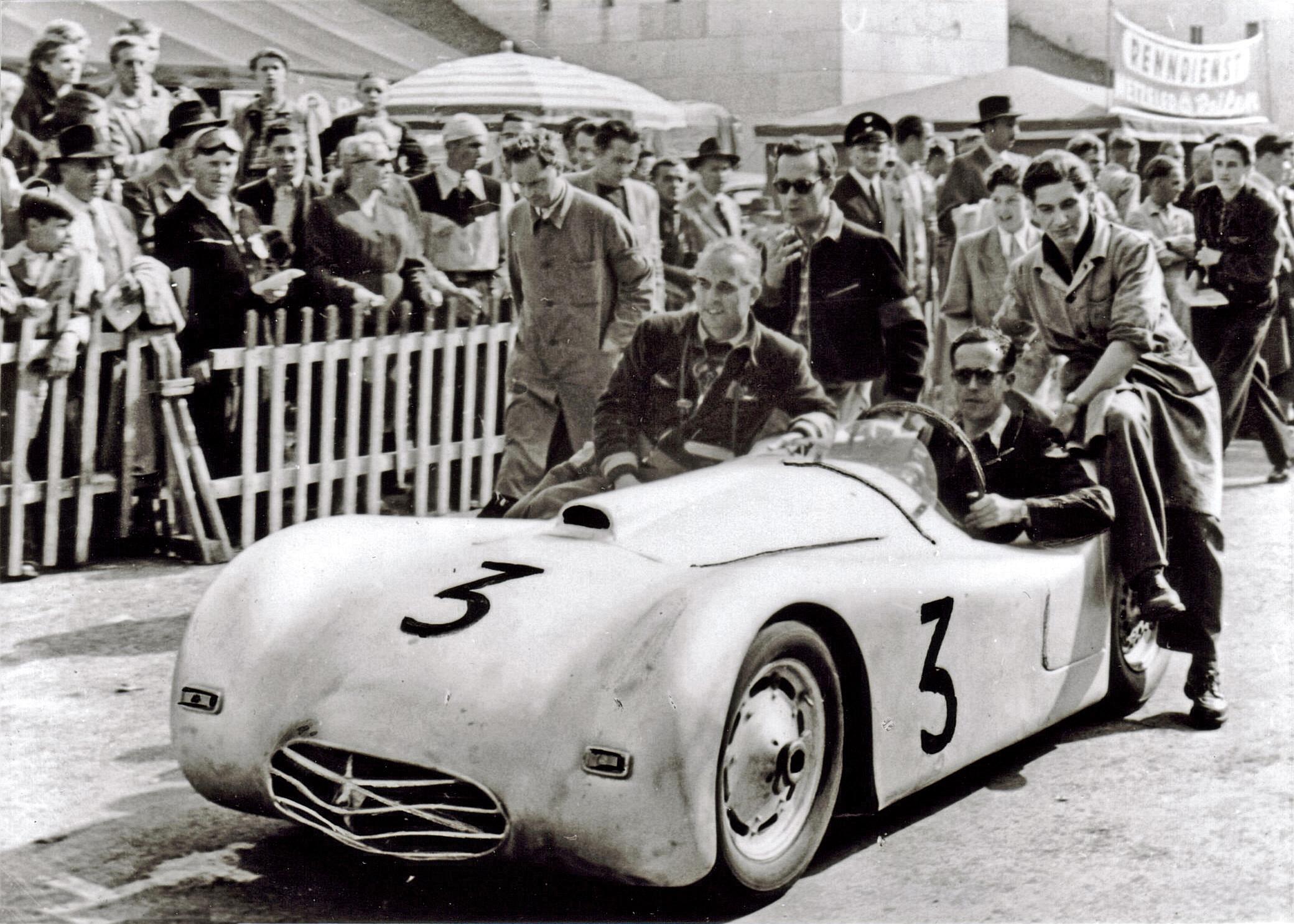
Bechem in his AFM F-50 after a victory at the Norisring in 1951

== Complete World Championship results ==
(key)

Year	Entrant	Chassis	Engine	1	2	3	4	5	6	7	8	9	WDC	Points
1952	"Bernhard Nacke"	BMW Eigenbau	BMW Straight-6	SUI	500	BEL	FRA	GBR	GER; Ret	NED	ITA		NC	0
1953	Günther Bechem	AFM 50-5	BMW Straight-6	ARG	500	NED	BEL	FRA	GBR	GER; Ret	SUI	ITA	NC	0

== Sources ==
- Profile at www.grandprix.com
