= Marcel Balsa =

French racing driver (1909–1984)

- Born: Emanuel Marcel Lucien Balsa; 1 January 1909; Saint-Frion, France
- Died: 11 August 1984 (aged 75); Maisons-Alfort, France

Formula One World Championship career
- Nationality: (France) French
- Active years: 1952
- Team: non-works BMW
- Entries: 1
- Championships: 0
- Wins: 0
- Podiums: 0
- Career points: 0
- Pole positions: 0
- Fastest laps: 0
- First entry: 1952 German Grand Prix

Emanuel Marcel Lucien Balsa (January 1, 1909 – August 11, 1984) was a French racing driver.

Balsa started in racing after World War II, when he acquired a Bugatti Type 51 and became quite competitive in the French national events. He later built a BMW-engined Formula 2 car, and had a good reputation, until he tried a Jicey-BMW developed by Jean Caillas. With it he finished third in the Grand Prix of Cadours, the same event where fellow racer Raymond Sommer was killed. He returned to his previous race car and in 1952 raced in the German Grand Prix at the Nürburgring, only to retire after six laps. In 1953 he won a race at Montlhery but then faded from the racing scene.

== Complete Formula One World Championship results ==
(key)

Year	Entrant	Chassis	Engine	1	2	3	4	5	6	7	8	WDC	Points
1952	Marcel Balsa	BMW Special	BMW Straight-6	SUI	500	BEL	FRA	GBR	GER; Ret	NED	ITA	NC	0
