= Piero Carini =

Italian racing driver (1921–1957)

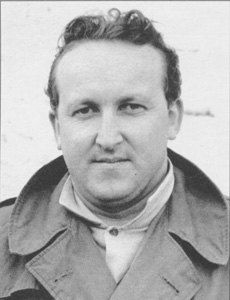
- Born: 6 March 1921; Genoa, Italy
- Died: 30 May 1957 (aged 36); Saint-Étienne, France

Formula One World Championship career
- Nationality: (Italy) Italian
- Active years: 1952 - 1953
- Team: Ferrari inc. non-works
- Entries: 3
- Championships: 0
- Wins: 0
- Podiums: 0
- Career points: 0
- Pole positions: 0
- Fastest laps: 0
- First entry: 1952 French Grand Prix
- Last entry: 1953 Italian Grand Prix

Piero Carini (6 March 1921 – 30 May 1957) was a racing driver from Italy. He was born in Genoa and died in Saint-Étienne, France.

== Racing career ==
Carini finished third in the 1950 Modena Grand Prix, run that year to Formula Two rules, driving an OSCA. However, the car proved unreliable in 1951 but he achieved enough to be invited to join Scuderia Marzotto for 1952, to drive their Ferrari sports and Grand Prix cars. Despite only competing in two Grands Prix (debuting on 6 July 1952) and retiring from both, Carini did well enough to be signed by the works Ferrari team for 1953, effectively as a "junior" driver alongside Umberto Maglioli. However he only competed in the Italian Grand Prix and at the end of the season moved to Alfa Romeo for 1954, to drive their touring cars achieving class wins in the Mille Miglia, the Tour of Sicily and the Dolomite Cup.

In 1955, Carini drove a Ferrari to class wins at Dakar and Caracas, Venezuela, and an OSCA to a class win in the Targa Florio.

In 1957, driving in a sports car race, near Saint-Étienne, France, with a Ferrari Testa Rossa, Carini's car crossed the central reservation and collided with another competitor, killing him instantly.

== Complete Formula One World Championship results ==
(key)

Year	Entrant	Chassis	Engine	1	2	3	4	5	6	7	8	9	WDC	Points
1952	Scuderia Marzotto	Ferrari 166	Ferrari V12	SUI	500	BEL	FRA; Ret	GBR	GER; Ret	NED	ITA		NC	0
1953	Scuderia Ferrari	Ferrari 553	Ferrari V12	ARG	500	NED	BEL	FRA	GBR	GER	SUI	ITA; Ret	NC	0
