= Alex von Falkenhausen Motorenbau =

Automobile manufacturer

AFM
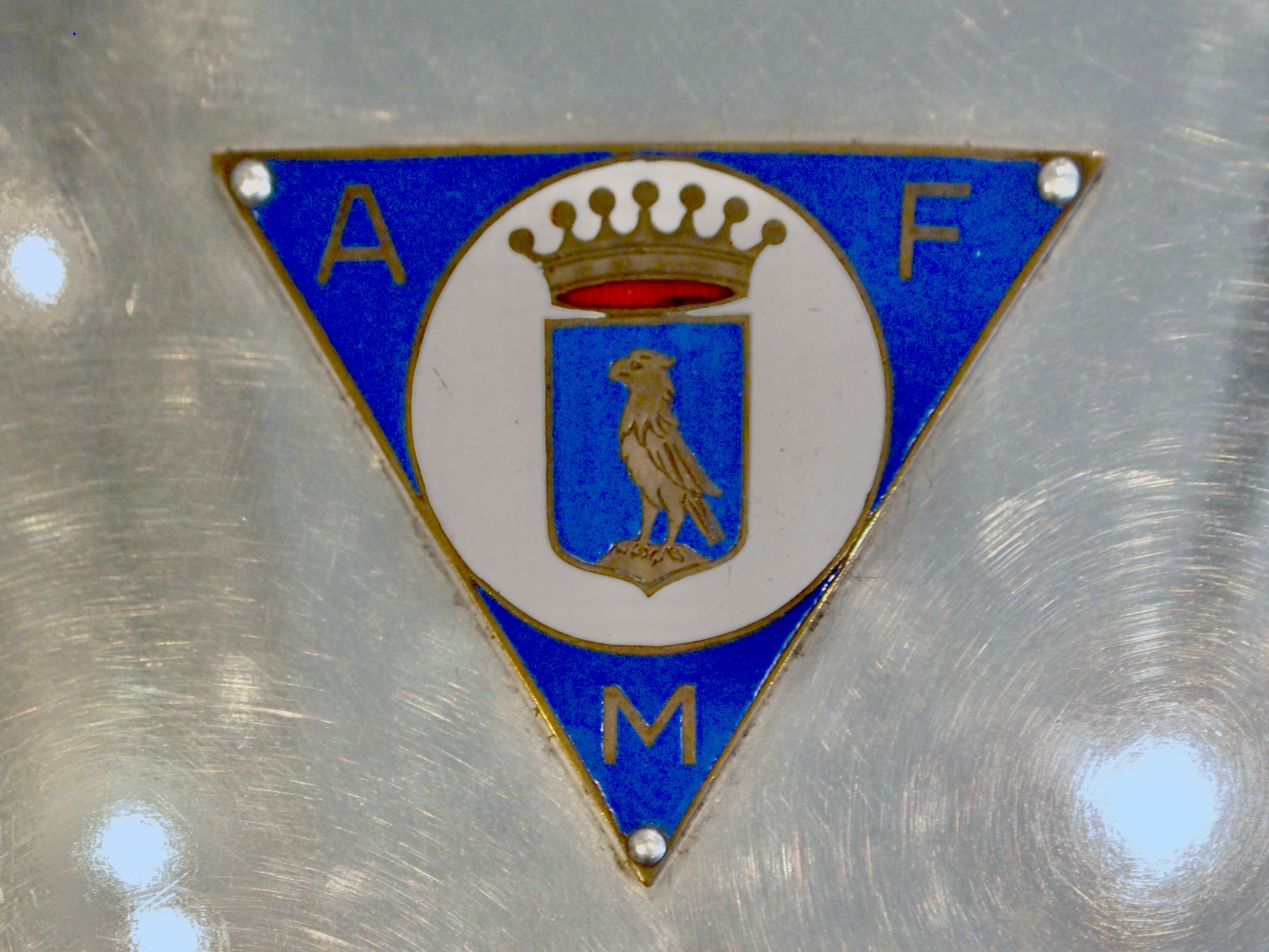
- Full name: (Germany) Alex von Falkenhausen Motorenbau
- Base: Munich, Germany
- Founder(s): (Germany) Alexander von Falkenhausen
- Noted drivers: (Germany) Hans Stuck

Formula One World Championship career
- First entry: 1952 Swiss Grand Prix
- Races entered: 4
- Engines: BMW, Bristol, Küchen
- Constructors' Championships: 0
- Drivers' Championships: 0
- Race victories: 0
- Pole positions: 0
- Fastest laps: 0
- Final entry: 1953 Italian Grand Prix

Alex von Falkenhausen Motorenbau (AFM) (but some sources claim the M stood for Munich) was a German racing car constructor. The team was started by Alexander von Falkenhausen, who was in the 1930s an important engineer in the development of BMW's model 328, along with Alfred Boning, Ernst Loof and Fritz Fiedler. The 328 was a dominant sports car in late 1930s Europe and winner of the 1940 Mille Miglia race in Brescia, Italy.

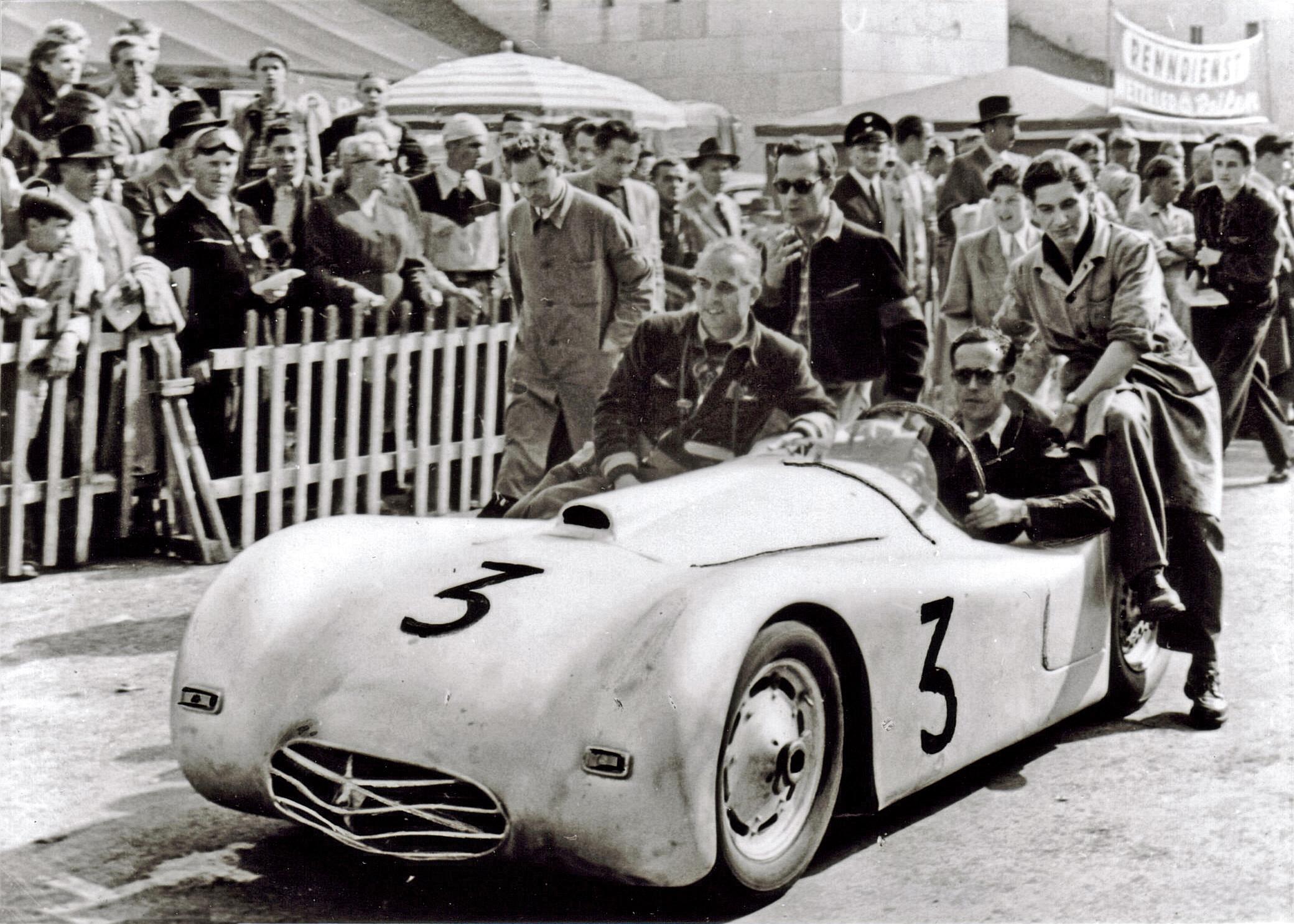
Karl-Günther Bechem in his AFM F-50 after a victory at the Norisring in 1951

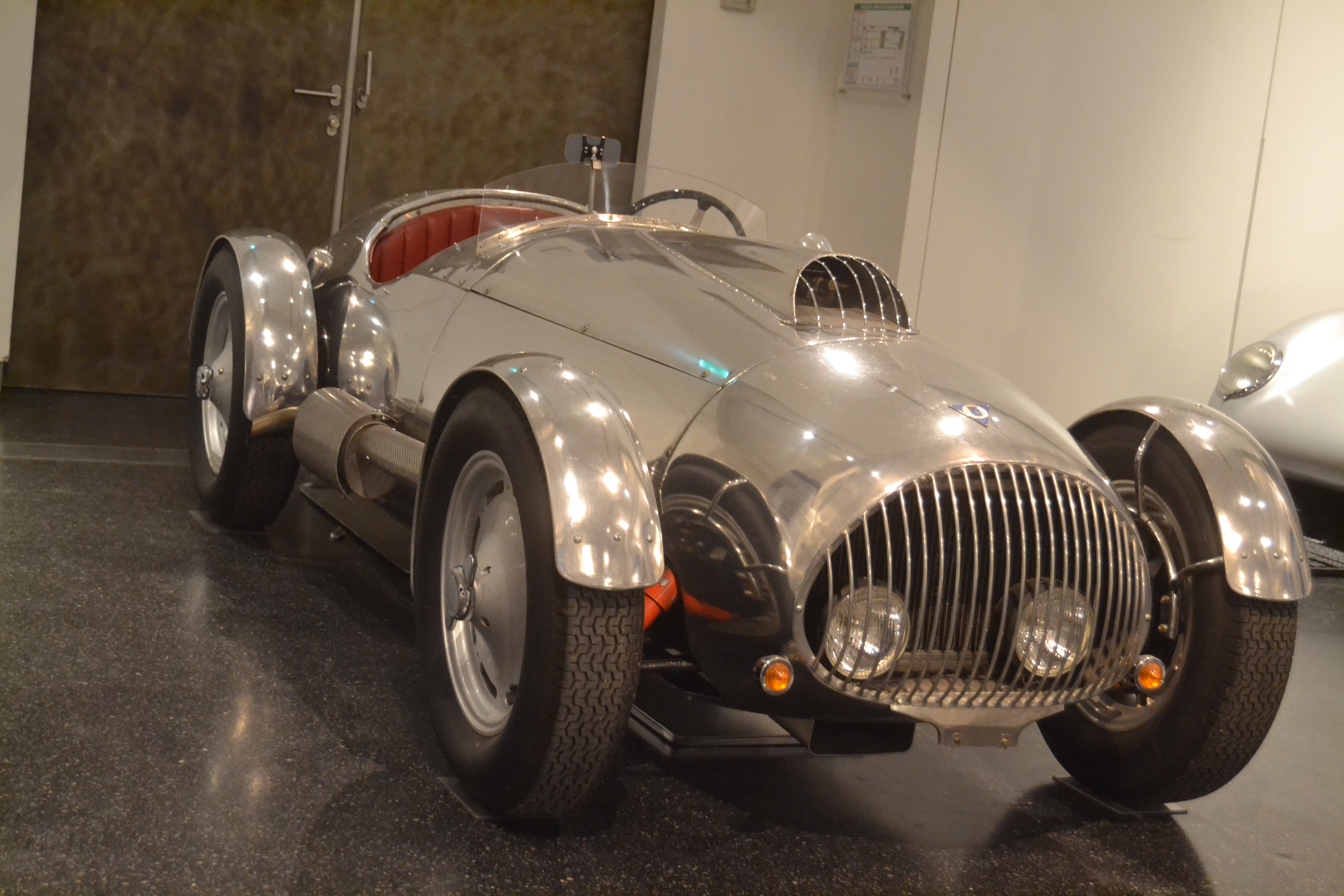
AFM Intertyp Racing Car (1948)

After World War II, von Falkenhausen opened a garage in Munich where he tuned pre-war 328s, converting some of them into single-seaters, and in 1948 went on to build his own car marque with the 328's engine. As a result, the Formula 2 AFM-1 appeared in 1949, driven by Hans Stuck, resulting in a third place at the Grenzlandring. AFM won a heat in the Autodromo GP at Monza with Stuck behind the wheel, beating the Ferraris of Alberto Ascari and Juan Manuel Fangio. Other cars were raced by Fritz Riess, Karl Gommann, Willi Heeks and Manfred von Brauchitsch. By 1951 Stuck was within the development of a lightweight V8 engine designed by Richard Küchen and won the 1951 Grenzlandring F2 race with the so-called AFM-4-"Küchen". The 1952 and 1953 World Drivers' Championships were run to Formula Two regulations, enabling AFM cars to compete in several World Championship rounds. By the time 1953 rolled in, the cars were becoming less competitive and with the fall of F2 that year the marque and the team faded away, while Freiherr von Falkenhausen in 1954 started to work for BMW again, leading their Rennsportabteilung for more than the following 20 years.

== World Championship participation: 1952–1953 ==
The first AFM to be entered in a World Championship Grand Prix was a works car entered for Stuck at the 1952 Swiss Grand Prix. Stuck qualified the car 14th, beating some established names such as Harry Schell, who was driving a Maserati entered by Enrico Platé. However, he was some 14 seconds behind the pole time of Giuseppe Farina's works Ferrari. In the race, Stuck dropped back steadily until Küchen's engine failed him on the fifth lap.

The other race of 1952 to feature AFM cars was the German Grand Prix. Privately owned cars were entered by Willi Heeks, Helmut Niedermayr, Ludwig Fischer and Willi Krakau, all using BMW engines instead of the Küchen unit favoured by the works team. Neither Fischer nor Krakau started the race, and while Niedermayr was down in 22nd place, Heeks qualified his car a magnificent 9th. He qualified ahead of several works cars, including Jean Behra's Gordini. Come the race, Heeks took advantage of both Paul Pietsch's Veritas and Ernst Klodwig's BMW running into trouble on the opening lap, and moved up to 7th, where he remained for 5 laps. However, on lap 6, he began to suffer with the BMW engine in his car, and by the end of the 8th lap, he was out. Meanwhile, Niedermayr had been making fantastic progress from his lowly grid slot. Heeks' retirement moved his compatriot up into 9th place. By capitalising on other's mistakes. Niedermayr had moved up through the field, and when Robert Manzon's Gordini lost a wheel on the 9th lap, he inherited the Frenchman's 8th place. He was passed by Toni Ulmen, driving a Veritas, late in the race, but still brought the car home in 9th, the first ever finish for an AFM in a championship race.

AFMs were back in action in Germany the following year. Stuck entered once again, privately this time. He was using yet another different engine, the Bristol straight six. He was joined by Günther Bechem in his privately entered machine, and Theo Fitzau, driving a car for Niedermayr, who had performed so well in it himself the previous year. Niedermayr himself had retired from racing after killing at least 13 spectators during a crash at the Grenzlandring in 1952. Both Bechem and Fitzau were using BMW engines. Fitzau was the highest qualifier, in 21st place, over 80 seconds behind Alberto Ascari on pole for Ferrari. Stuck was 23rd, while Bechem, down in 30th, was well over 2 minutes shy of Ascari's time, made possible by the extreme length of the Nürburgring circuit. Stuck was out on lap 1, as his new engine failed. By the end of lap 4, Bechem and Fitzau were also out with similar engine problems.

AFM's last appearance in championship F1 came at the Italian Grand Prix later in the year, as Stuck entered his car again. He qualified second last, beating only Johnny Claes's Connaught. However, he finished 14th in the race, simply by virtue of not running into difficulties. He was 13 laps behind the victorious Juan Manuel Fangio.

As Grand Prix racing abandoned the F2 regulations at the end of 1953, so AFM withdrew from the scene. Their best result remained Niedermayr's 9th place at the German Grand Prix of 1952.

== Complete World Championship results ==
(key)

| Year | Chassis | Engines | Tyres | Drivers | 1 | 2 | 3 | 4 | 5 | 6 | 7 | 8 | 9 |
|---|---|---|---|---|---|---|---|---|---|---|---|---|---|
| 1952 | AFM | | | | SUI | 500 | BEL | FRA | GBR | GER | NED | ITA | |
| 1952 | AFM | Küchen V8 | E | Hans Stuck | Ret | | | | | | | | |
| 1952 | AFM | BMW L6 | ? | Willi Heeks | | | | | | Ret | | | |
| 1952 | AFM | BMW L6 | ? | Helmut Niedermayr | | | | | | 9 | | | |
| 1952 | AFM | BMW L6 | ? | Ludwig Fischer | | | | | | DNS | | | |
| 1952 | AFM | BMW L6 | ? | Willi Krakau | | | | | | DNS | | | |
| 1953 | AFM | | | | ARG | 500 | NED | BEL | FRA | GBR | GER | SUI | ITA |
| 1953 | AFM | Bristol L6 | D | Hans Stuck | | | | | | | Ret | | 14 |
| 1953 | AFM | BMW L6 | D | Theo Fitzau | | | | | | | Ret | | |
| 1953 | AFM | BMW L6 | D | Günther Bechem | | | | | | | Ret | | |
