= Willi Krakau =

German racing driver (1911–1995)

- Born: 4 December 1911; Felgeleben, Saxony, Germany
- Died: 26 April 1995 (aged 83); Peine, Lower Saxony, Germany

Formula One World Championship career
- Nationality: (Germany) German
- Active years: 1952
- Team: privateer AFM
- Entries: 1 (0 starts)
- Championships: 0
- Wins: 0
- Podiums: 0
- Career points: 0
- Pole positions: 0
- Fastest laps: 0
- First entry: 1952 German Grand Prix

Willi Krakau (4 December 1911 – 26 April 1995) was a racing driver from Germany. During the late 1940s and early 1950s, he built a reputation as a constructor of special racing cars, sometimes based on the BMW 328, with which he enjoyed some success in various formulae including Formula Two.

Krakau's single entry into a World Championship race was at the 1952 German Grand Prix. Driving his six-cylinder AFM car, he completed the qualifying sessions but did not appear on the starting grid.

Prior to his motor racing exploits, Krakau had tried his hand at several sports, and was a member of the German rowing team at the 1936 Summer Olympics.

Krakau died in Peine in 1995.

== Complete World Championship results ==
(key)

Year	Entrant	Chassis	Engine	1	2	3	4	5	6	7	8	WDC	Points
1952	Willi Krakau	AFM	BMW Straight-6	SUI	500	BEL	FRA	GBR	GER; DNS	NED	ITA	NC	0
