= Josef Peters =

Josef Peters may refer to:

- Josef Peters (racing driver) (1914–2001), German Formula One driver
- Josef John W. Peters, a former member of I Killed the Prom Queen, an Australian metalcore band

== See also ==
- Joseph Peters, one of the aliases of J. Peters (1894–1990), Communist political activist and espionage agent in the United States from 1924 to 1949
