= 1952 German Grand Prix =

| ← Previous race | Next race → |

Race details
- Date: 3 August 1952
- Official name: XV Großer Preis von Deutschland
- Location: Nürburgring, Nürburg, West Germany
- Course: Permanent racing facility
- Course length: 22.810 km (14.173 miles)
- Distance: 18 laps, 410.580 km (255.123 miles)
- Weather: Sunny

Pole position
| Driver | (Italy) Alberto Ascari | Ferrari |
- Time: 10:04.4

Fastest lap
| Driver | (Italy) Alberto Ascari | Ferrari |
- Time: 10:05.1 on lap 5

Podium
| First | (Italy) Alberto Ascari | Ferrari |
| Second | (Italy) Giuseppe Farina | Ferrari |
| Third | (Switzerland) Rudi Fischer | Ferrari |

The 1952 German Grand Prix was a Formula Two race held on 3 August 1952 at the Nürburgring Nordschleife. It was race 6 of 8 in the 1952 World Championship of Drivers, in which each Grand Prix was run to Formula Two rules rather than the Formula One regulations normally used. The 18-lap race was won by Ferrari driver Alberto Ascari after he started from pole position. His teammates Giuseppe Farina and Rudi Fischer finished in second and third places.

1952 was the 25th anniversary of the race track, and a sports car race dubbed the XV. Großer Preis von Deutschland – Großer Jubiläumspreis vom Nürburgring für Sportwagen 1952 was run as support. It was won 1-2-3-4 by Mercedes-Benz W194 300 SL Spyders.

== Report ==
The Maserati factory team finally appeared with their new car, the A6GCM, which was driven by Felice Bonetto. Also racing A6GCMs were the Escuderia Bandeirantes drivers Bianco and Cantoni. Ferrari once again entered the successful trio of Alberto Ascari, Nino Farina and Piero Taruffi, while there were privateer Ferrari entries for Rudi Fischer and Rudolf Schoeller of Ecurie Espadon, Roger Laurent of Ecurie Francorchamps, and Piero Carini of Scuderia Marzotto. Jean Behra returned to action for the Gordini team, having recovered from his shoulder injury. He replaced Prince Bira, and was partnered by teammates Robert Manzon and Maurice Trintignant. HWM entered three cars, with regular Peter Collins joined by the Belgian pairing of Paul Frère and Johnny Claes, while Australian Tony Gaze drove a privateer HWM. Bill Aston drove an Aston Butterworth, and the field was completed by a plethora of privateer German cars (Veritas, AFM and BMW).

Ferrari were once again fastest in qualifying, with Ascari and Farina being joined on the front row of the grid by the Gordinis of Trintignant and Manzon. The remaining works Ferrari driver, Taruffi, started from the second row, alongside the Ecurie Espadon-entered Ferrari of Fischer and Paul Pietsch in a Veritas. Bonetto's works Maserati made the third row, along with the Gordini of Jean Behra, and a pair of local entrants: Hans Klenk's Veritas, and Willi Heeks in an AFM.

The race turned out to be rather a processional event, with Ascari leading Farina all the way in the first 16 laps. Two laps from home, he had to dive into the pits for oil, emerging 10 seconds behind Farina-which he rattled off on the next lap, catching Farina just a mile from home to win by several seconds after an otherwise dull race. Piero Taruffi had been running in third behind his teammates, but he lost the position to Rudi Fischer towards the end of the race when he encountered problems due to his suspension breaking. Fischer's podium and Taruffi's fourth place-finish ensured that it was a Ferrari 1-2-3-4. Manzon, who had been running in fourth for much of the first half of the race, between Taruffi and Fischer, was forced to retire when a wheel fell off his car. This meant that his teammate Behra was left to take the final points in fifth position in his Gordini, ahead of Roger Laurent's Ferrari. Felice Bonetto, of the factory Maserati team, was disqualified for receiving a push start after his first lap spin.

Ascari, who had taken his fourth consecutive victory, along with a fourth consecutive fastest lap, had now scored the maximum of 36 points for the season, as only a driver's four best results counted. As a result, he clinched the world championship, making him the first driver to win the championship with two races left to go. The date was 3 August, the earliest anyone would claim the Championship until Jim Clark seized the crown on 1 August in 1965, also at the Nürburgring. Ascari's teammates, Taruffi and Farina, remained in second and third, respectively, in the Drivers' Championship, while Swiss driver Fischer's second podium of the season raised him up to fourth in the standings.

== Entries ==
| No | Driver | Entrant | Constructor | Chassis | Engine | Tyre |
|---|---|---|---|---|---|---|
| 101 | (Italy) Alberto Ascari | Scuderia Ferrari | Ferrari | Ferrari 500 | Ferrari Type 500 2.0 L4 | P |
| 102 | (Italy) Nino Farina | Scuderia Ferrari | Ferrari | Ferrari 500 | Ferrari Type 500 2.0 L4 | P |
| 103 | (Italy) Piero Taruffi | Scuderia Ferrari | Ferrari | Ferrari 500 | Ferrari Type 500 2.0 L4 | P |
| 104 | (Italy) Piero Carini | Scuderia Marzotto | Ferrari | Ferrari 166F2-50 | Ferrari 166 2.0 V12 | P |
| 105 | (Italy) Felice Bonetto | Officine Alfieri Maserati | Maserati | Maserati A6GCM | Maserati A6G 2.0 L6 | P |
| 107 | (France) Robert Manzon | Equipe Gordini | Gordini | Gordini T16 | Gordini 20 2.0 L6 | E |
| 108 | (France) Jean Behra | Equipe Gordini | Gordini | Gordini T16 | Gordini 20 2.0 L6 | E |
| 109 | (France) Maurice Trintignant | Equipe Gordini | Gordini | Gordini T16 | Gordini 20 2.0 L6 | E |
| 110 | (France) Marcel Balsa | Marcel Balsa | Balsa-BMW | Balsa Spécial | BMW 328 2.0 L6 | E |
| 111 | (United Kingdom) Peter Collins | HW Motors | HWM-Alta | HWM 52 | Alta F2 2.0 L4 | D |
| 112 | (Belgium) Paul Frère | HW Motors | HWM-Alta | HWM 52 | Alta F2 2.0 L4 | D |
| 113 | (Belgium) Johnny Claes | HW Motors | HWM-Alta | HWM 52 | Alta F2 2.0 L4 | D |
| 114 | (United Kingdom) Bill Aston | W.S. Aston | Aston Butterworth | Aston NB41 | Aston Butterworth F4 2.0 F4 | D |
| 115 | (Brazil) Gino Bianco | Escuderia Bandeirantes | Maserati | Maserati A6GCM | Maserati A6G 2.0 L6 | P |
| 116 | (Uruguay) Eitel Cantoni | Escuderia Bandeirantes | Maserati | Maserati A6GCM | Maserati A6G 2.0 L6 | P |
| 117 | (Switzerland) Rudi Fischer | Ecurie Espadon | Ferrari | Ferrari 500 | Ferrari Type 500 2.0 L4 | P |
| 118 | (Switzerland) Rudolf Schoeller | Ecurie Espadon | Ferrari | Ferrari 212 | Ferrari 166 2.0 V12 | P |
| 119 | (Belgium) Roger Laurent | Ecurie Francorchamps | Ferrari | Ferrari 500 | Ferrari Type 500 2.0 L4 | P |
| 120 | (Australia) Tony Gaze | Tony Gaze | HWM-Alta | HWM 52 | Alta F2 2.0 L4 | D |
| 121 | (West Germany) Fritz Riess | Fritz Riess | Veritas-BMW | Veritas RS | BMW 328 2.0 L6 | ? |
| 122 | (West Germany) Theo Helfrich | Theo Helfrich | Veritas-BMW | Veritas RS | BMW 328 2.0 L6 | ? |
| 123 | (West Germany) Willi Heeks | Willi Heeks | AFM-BMW | AFM 50 (M8) | BMW 328 2.0 L6 | ? |
| 124 | (West Germany) Helmut Niedermayr | Helmut Niedermayr | AFM-BMW | AFM 50 (M6) | BMW 328 2.0 L6 | ? |
| 125 | (West Germany) Toni Ulmen | Toni Ulmen | Veritas-BMW | Veritas Meteor | BMW 328 2.0 L6 | ? |
| 126 | (West Germany) Adolf Brudes | Adolf Brudes | Veritas-BMW | Veritas RS | BMW 328 2.0 L6 | ? |
| 127 | (West Germany) Paul Pietsch | Motor Presse Verlag | Veritas | Veritas Meteor | Veritas 2.0 L6 | ? |
| 128 | (West Germany) Hans Klenk | Hans Klenk | Veritas | Veritas Meteor | Veritas 2.0 L6 | ? |
| 129 | (West Germany) Josef Peters | Josef Peters | Veritas-BMW | Veritas RS | BMW 328 2.0 L6 | ? |
| 130 | (West Germany) Günther Bechem | Bernd Nacke | Nacke-BMW | Nacke HH48 | BMW 328 2.0 L6 | ? |
| 131 | (West Germany) Ludwig Fischer | Ludwig Fischer | AFM-BMW | AFM 49 | BMW 328 2.0 L6 | ? |
| 133 | (West Germany) Willi Krakau | Willi Krakau | AFM-BMW | AFM 50 (M3) | BMW 328 2.0 L6 | ? |
| 134 | (West Germany) Harry Merkel | Willi Krakau | Krakau-BMW | Krakau Eigenbau | BMW 328 2.0 L6 | ? |
| 135 | (East Germany) Ernst Klodwig | Ernst Klodwig | Heck-BMW | Heck Eigenbau | BMW 328 2.0 L6 | ? |
| 136 | (East Germany) Rudolf Krause | Rudolf Krause | Reif-BMW | Reif Eigenbau | BMW 328 2.0 L6 | ? |

== Classification ==
=== Qualifying ===
Only the lap times from the 7 best placed drivers are known.

| Pos | No | Driver | Constructor | Time | Gap |
|---|---|---|---|---|---|
| 1 | 101 | (Italy) Alberto Ascari | Ferrari | 10:04.4 | – |
| 2 | 102 | (Italy) Nino Farina | Ferrari | 10:07.3 | + 2.9 |
| 3 | 109 | (France) Maurice Trintignant | Gordini | 10:19.1 | + 14.7 |
| 4 | 107 | (France) Robert Manzon | Gordini | 10:25.3 | + 20.9 |
| 5 | 103 | (Italy) Piero Taruffi | Ferrari | 10:26.3 | + 21.9 |
| 6 | 117 | (Switzerland) Rudi Fischer | Ferrari | 10:41.9 | + 37.5 |
| 7 | 127 | (West Germany) Paul Pietsch | Veritas | 10:56.3 | + 51.9 |
| 8 | 128 | (West Germany) Hans Klenk | Veritas | | |
| 9 | 123 | (West Germany) Willi Heeks | AFM-BMW | | |
| 10 | 105 | (Italy) Felice Bonetto | Maserati | | |
| 11 | 108 | (France) Jean Behra | Gordini | | |
| 12 | 121 | (West Germany) Fritz Riess | Veritas-BMW | | |
| 13 | 112 | (Belgium) Paul Frère | HWM-Alta | | |
| 14 | 120 | (Australia) Tony Gaze | HWM-Alta | | |
| 15 | 125 | (West Germany) Toni Ulmen | Veritas-BMW | | |
| 16 | 115 | (Brazil) Gino Bianco | Maserati | | |
| 17 | 119 | (Belgium) Roger Laurent | Ferrari | | |
| 18 | 122 | (West Germany) Theo Helfrich | Veritas-BMW | | |
| 19 | 126 | (West Germany) Adolf Brudes | Veritas-BMW | | |
| 20 | 129 | (West Germany) Josef Peters | Veritas-BMW | | |
| 21 | 114 | (United Kingdom) Bill Aston | Aston Butterworth | | |
| 22 | 124 | (West Germany) Helmut Niedermayr | AFM-BMW | | |
| 23 | 136 | (East Germany) Rudolf Krause | Reif-BMW | | |
| 24 | 118 | (Switzerland) Rudolf Schoeller | Ferrari | | |
| 25 | 110 | (France) Marcel Balsa | Balsa-BMW | | |
| 26 | 116 | (Uruguay) Eitel Cantoni | Maserati | | |
| 27 | 104 | (Italy) Piero Carini | Ferrari | | |
| 28 | 133 | (West Germany) Willi Krakau | AFM-BMW | | |
| 29 | 135 | (East Germany) Ernst Klodwig | Heck-BMW | | |
| 30 | 130 | (West Germany) Günther Bechem | Nacke-BMW | | |
| 31 | 131 | (West Germany) Ludwig Fischer | AFM-BMW | | |
| 32 | 113 | (Belgium) Johnny Claes | HWM-Alta | | |
| 33 | 111 | (United Kingdom) Peter Collins | HWM-Alta | | |
| 34 | 134 | (West Germany) Harry Merkel | Krakau-BMW | | |

=== Race ===
| Pos | No | Driver | Constructor | Laps | Time/Retired | Grid | Points |
|---|---|---|---|---|---|---|---|
| 1 | 101 | (Italy) Alberto Ascari | Ferrari | 18 | 3:06:13.3 | 1 | 9^{1} |
| 2 | 102 | (Italy) Nino Farina | Ferrari | 18 | +14.1 | 2 | 6 |
| 3 | 117 | (Switzerland) Rudi Fischer | Ferrari | 18 | +7:10.1 | 6 | 4 |
| 4 | 103 | (Italy) Piero Taruffi | Ferrari | 17 | +1 lap | 5 | 3 |
| 5 | 108 | (France) Jean Behra | Gordini | 17 | +1 lap | 11 | 2 |
| 6 | 119 | (Belgium) Roger Laurent | Ferrari | 16 | +2 laps | 17 | |
| 7 | 121 | (West Germany) Fritz Riess | Veritas-BMW | 16 | +2 laps | 12 | |
| 8 | 125 | (West Germany) Toni Ulmen | Veritas-BMW | 16 | +2 laps | 15 | |
| 9 | 124 | (West Germany) Helmut Niedermayr | AFM-BMW | 15 | +3 laps | 22 | |
| 10 | 113 | (Belgium) Johnny Claes | HWM-Alta | 15 | +3 laps | 32 | |
| 11 | 128 | (West Germany) Hans Klenk | Veritas | 14 | +4 laps | 8 | |
| 12 | 135 | (East Germany) Ernst Klodwig | Heck-BMW | 14 | +4 laps | 29 | |
| Ret | 107 | (France) Robert Manzon | Gordini | 8 | Accident | 4 | |
| Ret | 123 | (West Germany) Willi Heeks | AFM-BMW | 7 | Engine | 9 | |
| Ret | 120 | (Australia) Tony Gaze | HWM-Alta | 6 | Gearbox | 14 | |
| Ret | 126 | (West Germany) Adolf Brudes | Veritas-BMW | 5 | Engine | 19 | |
| Ret | 110 | (France) Marcel Balsa | Balsa-BMW | 5 | Engine | 25 | |
| Ret | 130 | (West Germany) Günther Bechem | Nacke-BMW | 5 | Ignition | 30 | |
| Ret | 116 | (Uruguay) Eitel Cantoni | Maserati | 4 | Axle | 26 | |
| Ret | 136 | (East Germany) Rudolf Krause | Reif-BMW | 3 | Engine | 23 | |
| Ret | 118 | (Switzerland) Rudolf Schoeller | Ferrari | 3 | Suspension | 24 | |
| Ret | 114 | (United Kingdom) Bill Aston | Aston Butterworth | 2 | Oil pressure | 21 | |
| Ret | 109 | (France) Maurice Trintignant | Gordini | 1 | Accident | 3 | |
| Ret | 127 | (West Germany) Paul Pietsch | Veritas | 1 | Gearbox | 7 | |
| DSQ | 105 | (Italy) Felice Bonetto | Maserati | 1 | Push start | 10 | |
| Ret | 112 | (Belgium) Paul Frère | HWM-Alta | 1 | Gearbox | 13 | |
| Ret | 122 | (West Germany) Theo Helfrich | Veritas-BMW | 1 | Engine | 18 | |
| Ret | 129 | (West Germany) Josef Peters | Veritas-BMW | 1 | Engine | 20 | |
| Ret | 104 | (Italy) Piero Carini | Ferrari | 1 | Brakes | 27 | |
| Ret | 115 | (Brazil) Gino Bianco | Maserati | 0 | Engine | 16 | |
| DNS | 133 | (West Germany) Willi Krakau | AFM-BMW | 0 | Non starter | | |
| DNS | 131 | (West Germany) Ludwig Fischer | AFM-BMW | 0 | Non starter | | |
| DNS | 134 | (West Germany) Harry Merkel | Krakau-BMW | 0 | Non starter | | |
| DNS | 111 | (United Kingdom) Peter Collins | HWM-Alta | 0 | Engine | | |

Notes

- ^1 – Includes 1 point for fastest lap

== Championship standings after the race ==
Drivers' Championship standings

| | Pos | Driver | Points |
|---|---|---|---|
| | 1 | (Italy) Alberto Ascari | 36 |
| | 2 | (Italy) Piero Taruffi | 22 |
| | 3 | (Italy) Nino Farina | 18 |
| 3 | 4 | (Switzerland) Rudi Fischer | 10 |
| 1 | 5 | (United States) Troy Ruttman | 8 |

- Note: Only the top five positions are included. Only the best 4 results counted towards the Championship.

| Previous race: 1952 British Grand Prix | FIA Formula One World Championship; 1952 season | Next race: 1952 Dutch Grand Prix |
| Previous race: 1951 German Grand Prix | German Grand Prix | Next race: 1953 German Grand Prix |
