= BMW in Formula One =

Formula One activities of BMW

BMW
- Full name: BMW Sauber F1 Team (2006–2009)
- Base: Hinwil, Switzerland; Munich, Germany
- Noted staff: Mario Theissen; Peter Sauber; Willy Rampf; Willem Toet; Andy Cowell; Andreas Seidl
- Noted drivers: (Germany) Ernst Klodwig (France) Marcel Balsa (Germany) "Bernhard Nacke" (Germany) Rudolf Krause (Colombia) Juan Pablo Montoya (Germany) Nick Heidfeld (Canada) Jacques Villeneuve (Poland) Robert Kubica (Germany) Sebastian Vettel

Formula One World Championship career
- First entry: 1952 German Grand Prix
- Races entered: 72
- Engines: BMW
- Constructors' Championships: 0
- Drivers' Championships: 0
- Race victories: 1
- Podiums: 17
- Points: 308
- Pole positions: 1
- Fastest laps: 2
- Final entry: 2009 Abu Dhabi Grand Prix

BMW as a Formula One engine manufacturer
Formula One World Championship career
- First entry: 1952 British Grand Prix
- Last entry: 2009 Abu Dhabi Grand Prix
- Races entered: 273 (270 starts)
- Chassis: Frazer Nash, AFM, Balsa, Heck, Krakau, Nacke, Reif, Greifzu, Klenk, Lola, BMW, Brabham, ATS, Arrows, Benetton, Williams, BMW Sauber
- Constructors' Championships: 0
- Drivers' Championships: 1 (1983)
- Race victories: 20
- Podiums: 86
- Points: 1,021
- Pole positions: 33
- Fastest laps: 33

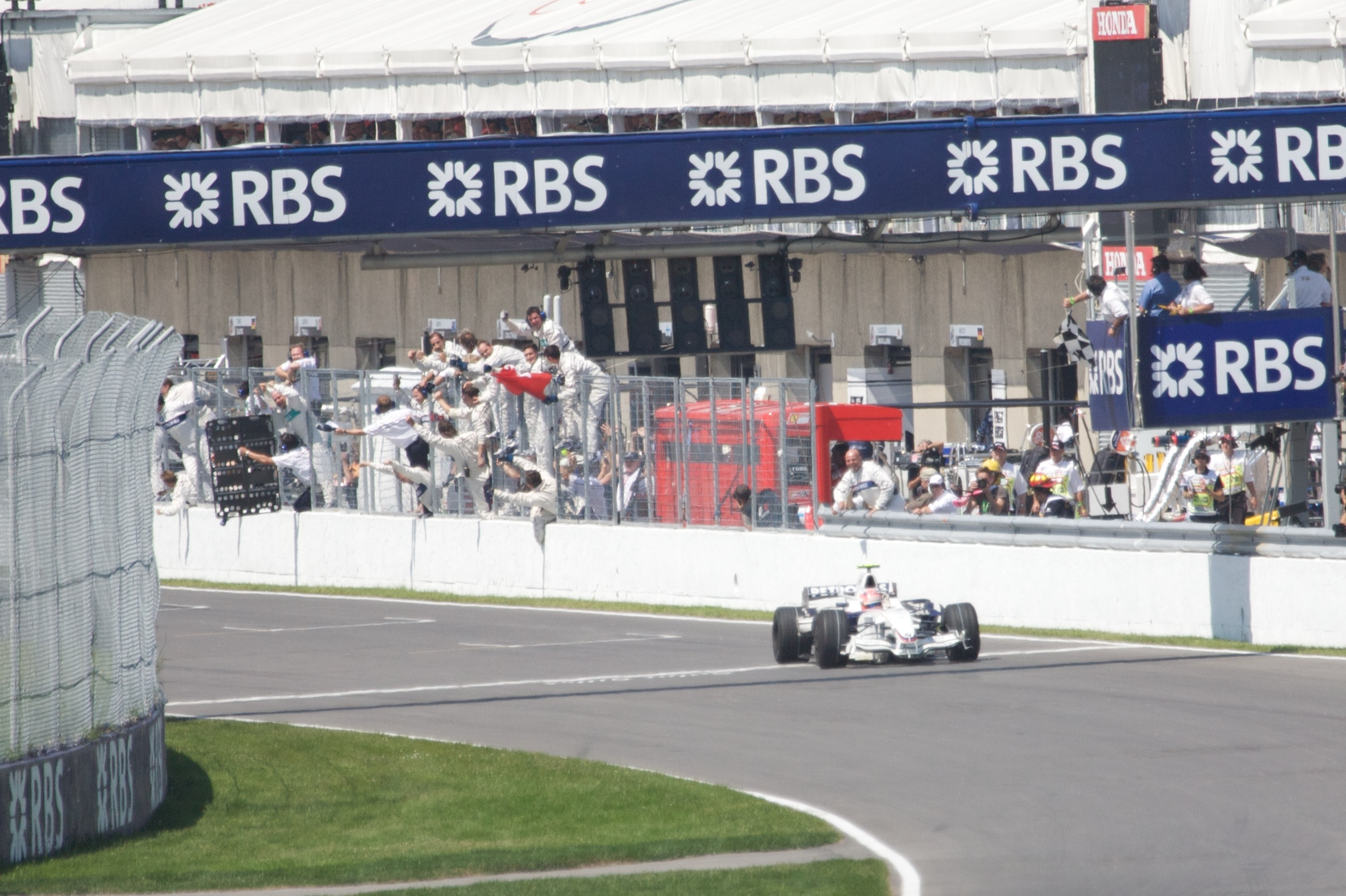
Robert Kubica crosses the finish line to win the 2008 Canadian Grand Prix, the only Formula One race that BMW has won as a full works team.

The German automobile manufacturer/brand BMW has been involved in Formula One in a number of capacities since the inauguration of the World Drivers' Championship in 1950. The company entered occasional races in the 1950s and 1960s (often under Formula Two regulations), before building the BMW M12/13 inline-four turbocharged engine in the 1980s. This engine was the result of a deal between BMW and Brabham, which resulted in the team's chassis being powered by BMW engines from 1982 until 1987, a period in which Nelson Piquet won the 1983 championship driving a Brabham BT52-BMW. BMW also supplied the M12/13 on a customer basis to the ATS, Arrows, Benetton and Ligier teams during this period, with various degrees of success. In 1988, Brabham temporarily withdrew from the sport and BMW withdrew its official backing from the engines, which were still used by the Arrows team under the Megatron badge. Turbocharged engines were banned by the revised Formula One Technical Regulations for 1989, rendering the M12/13 obsolete.

BMW decided to return to Formula One in the late 1990s by signing an exclusive contract with the Williams team, which needed a new long-term engine supplier after the withdrawal of Renault in 1997. The programme resulted in the creation of a new V10 engine which made its race début in the Williams FW22 in 2000. The following year saw the partnership move from the midfield to challenging for race victories, but the desired championship remained elusive due to the dominance of Michael Schumacher and Ferrari in the first half of the 2000s. By 2005, the relationship between BMW and Williams had deteriorated, and BMW chose to part company and buy the rival Sauber team outright.

The BMW Sauber project lasted from 2006 until 2009, and resulted in a substantial increase in competitiveness for the Swiss former privateer team. Two podium finishes in the first year were followed by a solid third in the Constructors' Championship in 2007 (which became second when McLaren was disqualified). In 2008, Robert Kubica won the team's only race, the 2008 Canadian Grand Prix, and led the Drivers' Championship at one point, but the team chose to focus on development of its 2009 car and slipped back in the standings by the end of the season. The 2009 season was a major disappointment as the F1.09 chassis proved uncompetitive. Combined with the global financial recession and the company's frustration about the limitations of the contemporary technical regulations in developing technology relevant to road cars, BMW chose to withdraw from the sport, selling the team back to its founder, Peter Sauber.

== Entries in the 1950s and 1960s ==
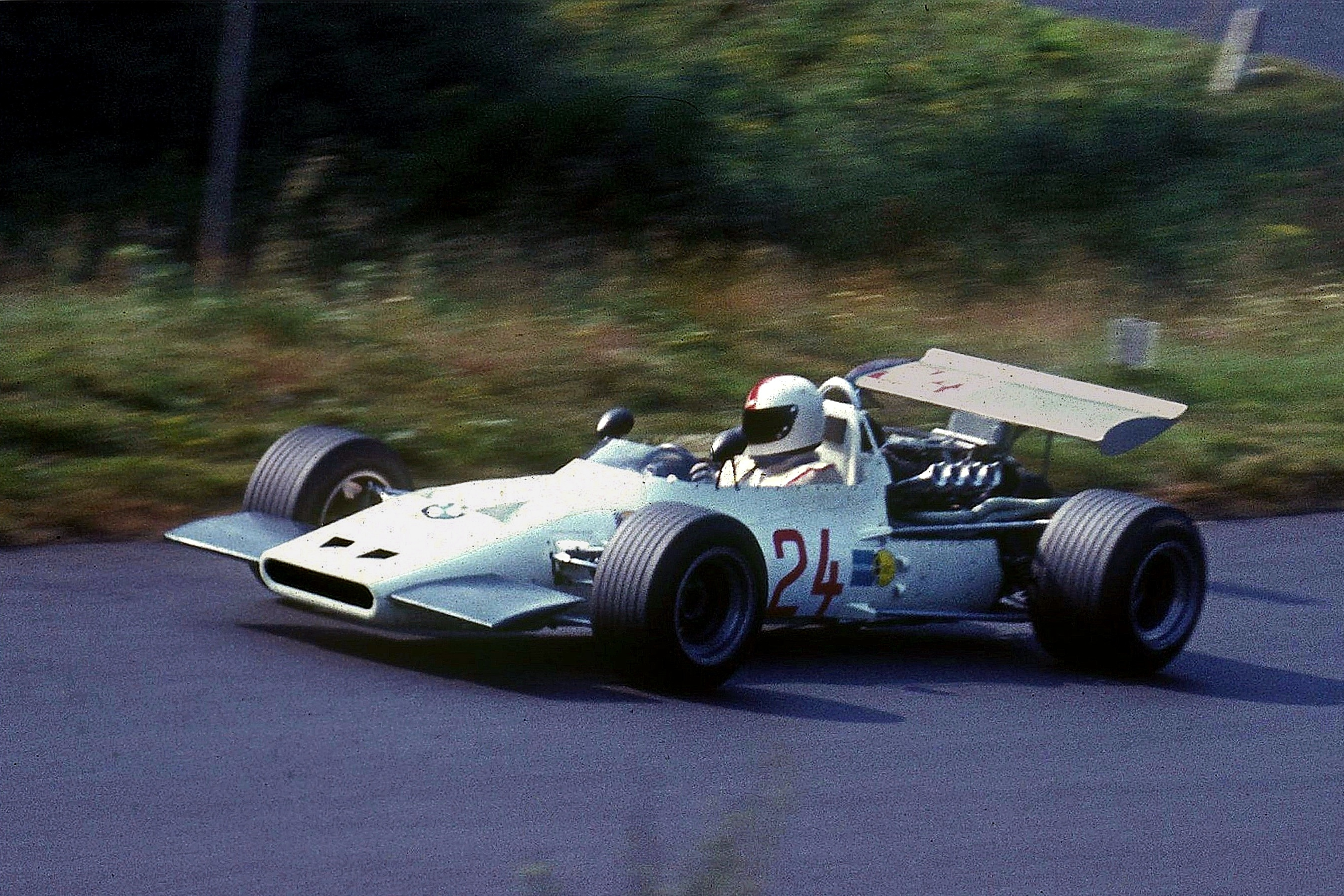
Gerhard Mitter was killed as a result of crashing his BMW 269 Formula Two car during practice for the 1969 German Grand Prix.

The early years of the post-war World Drivers' Championship saw private BMW racing cars, based on the pre-war BMW 328 chassis, entered in the 1952 and 1953 German Grands Prix. BMW-derived cars were also entered by the Alex von Falkenhausen Motorenbau (AFM) and Veritas companies in occasional races from 1951 to 1953. The entries occurred during this period because the championship was effectively run to Formula Two regulations, allowing the BMW cars to take part. Amongst the modified 328s was one driven by an engine in the rear of the car (known as the "Heck", the German automotive term for "back" or "rear"), a design feature which became standard in Formula One in the early 1960s after later success by the Cooper team.

In the 1960s, the Formula One German Grand Prix was often held concurrently with a Formula Two race on the same circuit, allowing BMW F2 cars to take part. In 1967, BMW entered Hubert Hahne in a Lola F2 chassis powered by an enlarged BMW engine which meant that it conformed with the Formula One regulations, while David Hobbs was entered by Lola in the same combination with the standard smaller BMW engine. For the 1968 race, Hahne returned with the previous year's combination and finished tenth, BMW's best result up to this point in its Formula One history. BMW then entered three of its own 269 F2 chassis for the 1969 race, for the trio of Hahne, Gerhard Mitter and Dieter Quester, but Mitter was fatally injured in a practice accident and the remainder of the team withdrew from the race.

== Engine supplier ==
=== Brabham, ATS, Arrows, Benetton and Ligier (1982–1988) ===
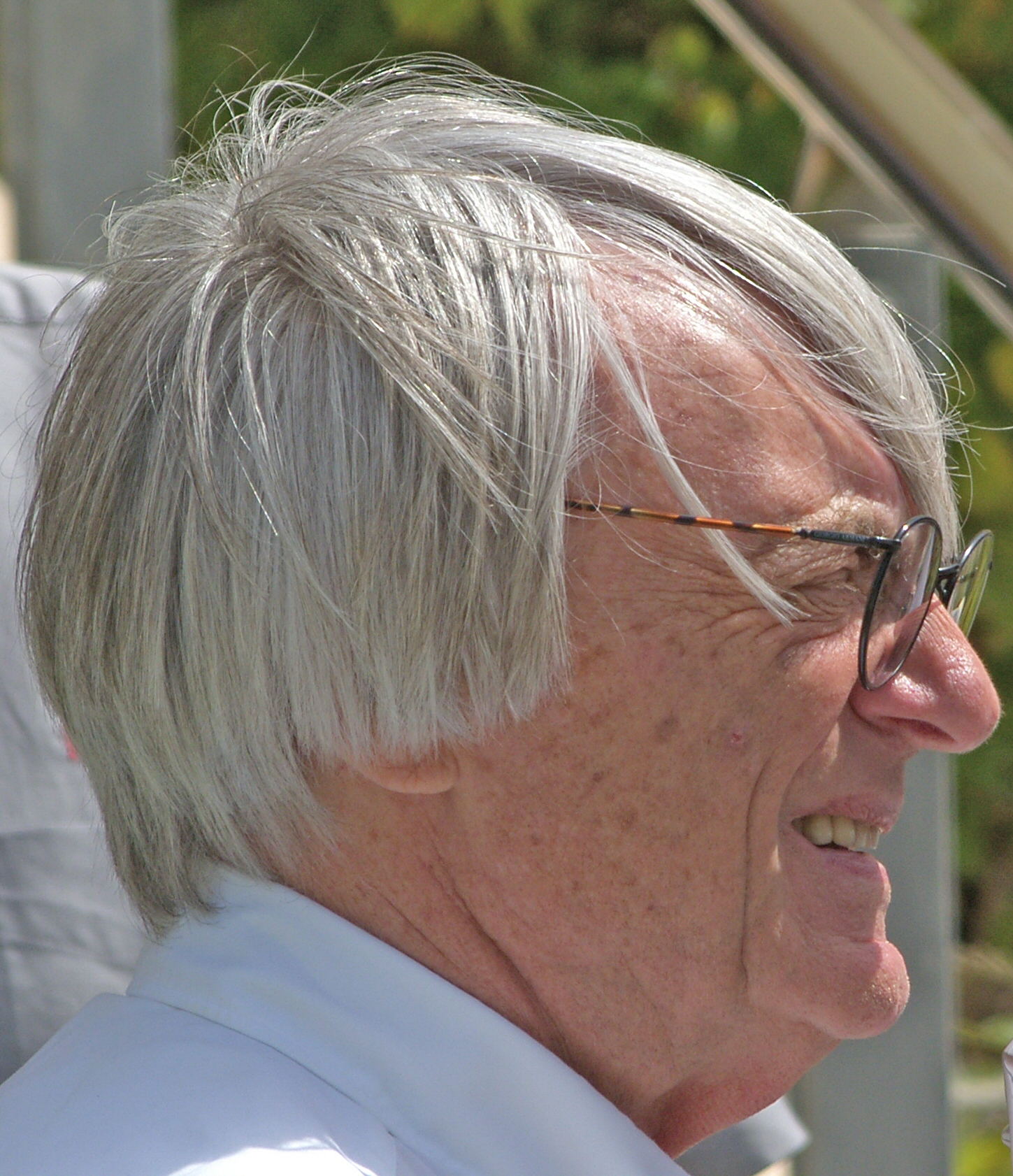
Bernie Ecclestone, the team principal of Brabham, signed a deal with BMW for a supply of M12/13 engines in 1980.

Following the commencement in 1977 of Renault's Formula One project with a turbocharged engine and increasing success thereafter, BMW decided to develop its own turbo engine for the sport, a programme which it announced to the media in April 1980. The engine was based on the M10 unit, a four-cylinder, 1.5-litre, normally aspirated engine that had originally been designed in the late 1950s. Its racing derivative, the M12 had also been used in racing throughout the intervening period, winning races in Formula Two and other categories. In 1979 and 1980, BMW provided a fleet of identical M1 cars for Formula One and other professional drivers to race in the BMW M1 Procar Championship, the rounds of which were held during Grand Prix race weekends, thus strengthening the marque's ties with the sport. At the same time, Jochen Neerpasch oversaw the development by Paul Rosche of a prototype 1.4-litre turbo engine, which soon developed 600 bhp at a pressure of 2.8 bar. It was equipped with a single Kühnle, Kopp & Kausch (KKK) turbocharger and Bosch electronics, including fuel injection. This engine formed the basis of the M12/13 design, the race unit that BMW ultimately supplied to five teams from 1982 to 1988.

Initial discussions were held with double World Champion Niki Lauda and McLaren on the subject of a 1980 campaign, but the BMW board denied Neerpasch's request for the programme. Neerpasch then left his position to join the French Talbot marque, which was also planning to enter Formula One, in this case with the Ligier team. Neerpasch had arranged the sale of Rosche's M12/13 engine to Talbot, but Rosche and Neerpasch's successor, Dieter Stappert, successfully protested to their board that such an undertaking deserved full works commitment, particularly as the fact that M12/13 was derived from a production road car engine meant that potential success could be extremely valuable to BMW from a marketing and sales point of view. BMW thus negotiated an exclusive supply of M12/13 engines to the Brabham team.

Testing of the M12/13 got underway in late 1980 with a Brabham BT49 chassis converted to accept the engine. The team's designer, Gordon Murray, designed a new car, the BT50 for the engine, but it was not completed until well into the 1981 season. The BT50 featured a longer wheelbase and a larger fuel cell than the BT49 to accommodate the requirements of the more powerful turbo engine, and was also one of the first Formula One cars to feature onboard telemetry as a means of monitoring the engine's fuel injection. The team's lead driver, Nelson Piquet, tested the BT50 throughout 1981, but the car proved chronically unreliable until Bosch introduced a digital electronic management system at the end of the year, which immediately improved the situation. The BT50 made a solitary race weekend appearance at the 1981 British Grand Prix, where Piquet set a qualifying time 0.7 seconds slower than his effort in the Cosworth DFV-powered BT49. The BT50 handled poorly but recorded 192 miles per hour (309 km/h) through the speed trap, some 15 miles per hour (24 km/h) faster than the BT49. Meanwhile, Brabham won the Drivers' Championship with Piquet, who drove the BT49 throughout the season.

Brabham began the 1982 season with two BMW-powered BT50 chassis at the South African Grand Prix, where Piquet and Patrese qualified second and fourth respectively, but retired early in the race. Team principal Bernie Ecclestone was under pressure from the team's title sponsor, Parmalat, to defend Piquet's championship, and opted to race with the Cosworth-powered BT49 chassis at the Brazilian Grand Prix, which Piquet won but was later disqualified for circumventing the minimum weight limit by running "water-cooled brakes". Both drivers also raced the BT49 at the Long Beach Grand Prix, and the team boycotted the San Marino Grand Prix as part of the ongoing FISA–FOCA war. For the following race, the Belgian Grand Prix, Piquet and Patrese switched back to the BT50, but Piquet finished three laps behind the winner and Patrese retired. As the relationship between Brabham, BMW and Parmalat became strained, Ecclestone was forced to compromise, with Piquet continuing development of the BT50 whilst Patrese raced with the Cosworth chassis. At the Monaco Grand Prix, Patrese won, whilst Piquet was more than two seconds slower in qualifying and retired from the race. The nadir of BMW's Formula One involvement thus far came at the Detroit Grand Prix, where engine reliability problems prevented Piquet from qualifying.

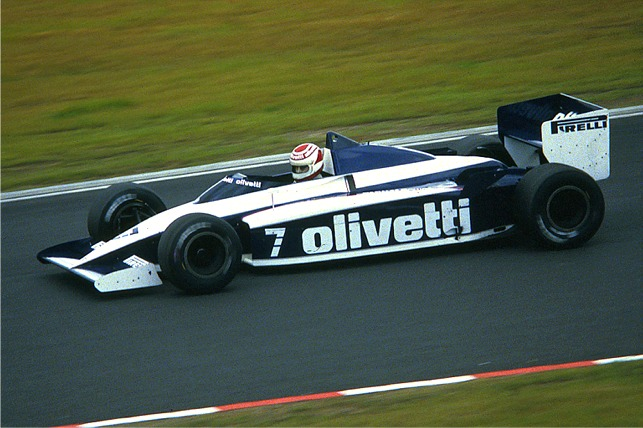
The association between BMW and Brabham lasted from 1981 until 1987. Pictured is Nelson Piquet driving the BMW-engined Brabham BT54 at the 1985 German Grand Prix.

BMW's fortunes suddenly improved, however, at the next race in Canada, where the cool conditions suited the turbocharged engines and allowed Piquet to lead home Patrese (still in the BT49), to record BMW's first Formula One victory. For the remainder of the season, both drivers raced with the BT50, and used Murray's radical strategy of a planned pit stop for refuelling midway through the race to run at the front of the field on numerous occasions. The car was still unreliable, though, restricting Piquet and Patrese to just four further finishes before the end of the season. The BMW engine's competitiveness was shown by the fact that Piquet retired from the lead of the British, French and German Grands Prix, whilst Patrese likewise retired from the lead of the Austrian Grand Prix. Patrese also secured BMW's first fastest lap at the French Grand Prix, whilst Piquet took the marque's maiden pole position at the Austrian race.

In 1983, the improved reliability of the BMW engine in the new BT52 allowed Piquet to win the Drivers' Championship, after overhauling Alain Prost (Renault) in the points standings. Brabham also finished third in the Constructors' Championship, although Patrese's lack of consistency in the second car prevented the team challenging for this title. Piquet won three races and Patrese won the season finale. BMW also began supplying its engines to the German ATS team this season, but sole driver Manfred Winkelhock was unable to score any points.

For 1984, BMW expanded to three teams by also supplying the M12/13 to Arrows. The team's A7 chassis was not ready at the beginning of the season, and drivers Marc Surer and Thierry Boutsen drove the Cosworth-engined A6 on ten out of 32 entries, but scored three points with BMW engines later in the year. ATS again failed to score with either Winkelhock or Gerhard Berger, and withdrew from the sport at the end of the season. At the front of the field, Piquet was unable to defend his title, which was dominated by the two McLaren drivers, Niki Lauda and Prost. Piquet took nine pole positions during the season, but retired from the same number of races, and the McLarens were usually faster in race conditions, although he did win the Canadian and Detroit Grands Prix. The second Brabham was filled in most races by Teo Fabi, who attempted to compete in a full season of IndyCars, but committed to F1 full-time part-way through the year. Due to his American commitments he missed three races, in which he was substituted by his brother, Corrado. Winkelhock also raced for the team in the final race of the season after the Fabis' father died shortly before the event.

In 1985, Brabham switched to Pirelli tyres, which had previously not been very competitive against the established Goodyear and Michelin suppliers, in the hope that the Italian company could provide bespoke tyres that would especially suit the new BT54 chassis. This proved to be a misjudgement, as Piquet only won one race—the French Grand Prix—and the team dropped from fourth to fifth in the Constructors' Championship. The team again had a clear number-one driver policy, with the second seat again being shared, this time between François Hesnault and Surer. Arrows, by contrast, had a much improved season, scoring 17 points with Berger and Boutsen, including a podium finish for the latter at the San Marino Grand Prix.

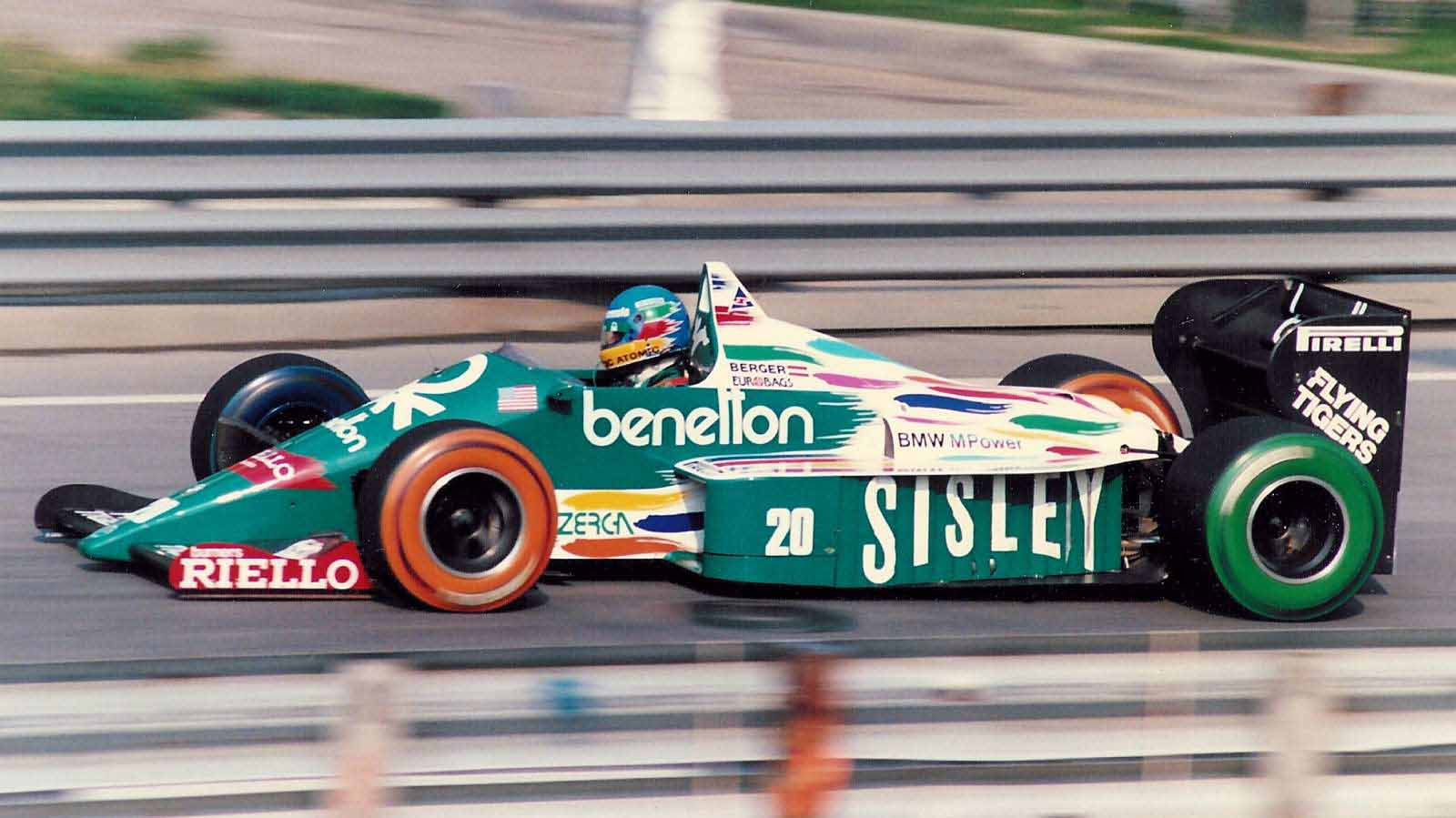
Benetton was the only other team that was supplied with the M12/13 to win a race.

For the 1986 season, Murray designed the radical low-line BT55 chassis, whose aim was to significantly reduce the car's drag and lower its centre of gravity. BMW produced the M12/13/1 engine, which was tilted sideways to fit in the reduced space allocated to the engine. Despite its theoretical advantages, the BT55 proved uncompetitive, suffering from poor traction and numerous mechanical failures caused by oil scavenge problems in the tilted engine. Moreover, the team suffered the death of Elio de Angelis in a testing accident after four races; his replacement Derek Warwick and team returnee Patrese scored two points between them all season. The Arrows team also slipped backwards, scoring just one point with Boutsen, Surer and Christian Danner, and also lost Surer's services mid-season when the Swiss driver was seriously injured in a rallying accident. BMW's most successful 1986 partnership was thus with the new Benetton team, which scored 19 points, won the Mexican Grand Prix and took two pole positions with Berger and Teo Fabi. Arrows and Benetton continued to use the original "upright" version of the M12/13 engine.

BMW reduced its full works commitment to the sole supply of Brabham in 1987; the team produced the more conservative BT56 chassis and scored ten points with Patrese, Andrea de Cesaris and Stefano Modena. At the end of the year, team owner Bernie Ecclestone, who was increasingly involved in running the commercial side of the sport, decided not to compete the following year, ending BMW's tenure as a supplier of works turbo engines. The Arrows team, however, was still keen to use the upright version of the M12/13, and arranged for its title sponsor, USF&G, to purchase the remaining stock. The engines were rebadged as "Megatrons", and were used to power the Arrows cars in 1987 and 1988, and the Ligier team in 1987 only. Arrows finished fifth in the Constructors' Championship in the latter of these two seasons, a result which stands as the best in the team's 25-year history.

For 1989, the technical regulations were changed to ban turbocharged engines, outlawing the M12/13 engine. During its time in F1, the engine had won the 1983 Drivers' Championship and nine Grands Prix. It also took 14 pole positions and set 13 fastest laps.

=== Williams (2000–2005) ===
After a ten-year absence from Formula One, BMW began evaluating a return to the sport in the late 1990s. In 1998, the marque signed a contract to supply the Williams team with engines. Williams had won the 1992, 1993, 1996 and 1997 Drivers' Championships, and the Constructors' Championships in all of these years as well as 1994, in a successful partnership with Renault, but the French company withdrew from the sport at the end of 1997, leaving team owner Frank Williams and Technical Director Patrick Head in need of a new engine partnership to remain competitive. As BMW spent 18 months building and testing a normally aspirated, three-litre V10 engine to comply with technical regulations that had changed significantly since the 1980s, the team used old Renault engines rebadged as first Mecachrome and then Supertec.

BMW's E41 engine was ready to compete in the 2000 season, fitted in the FW22 and driven by Ralf Schumacher and Jenson Button. Schumacher scored a podium finish in the engine's first race, and added two more during the course of the season. A series of consistent points-scoring finishes meant that Williams finished a competitive third in the Constructors' Championship, some distance behind the dominant Ferrari and McLaren teams, but ahead of engine manufacturers with more recent experience.

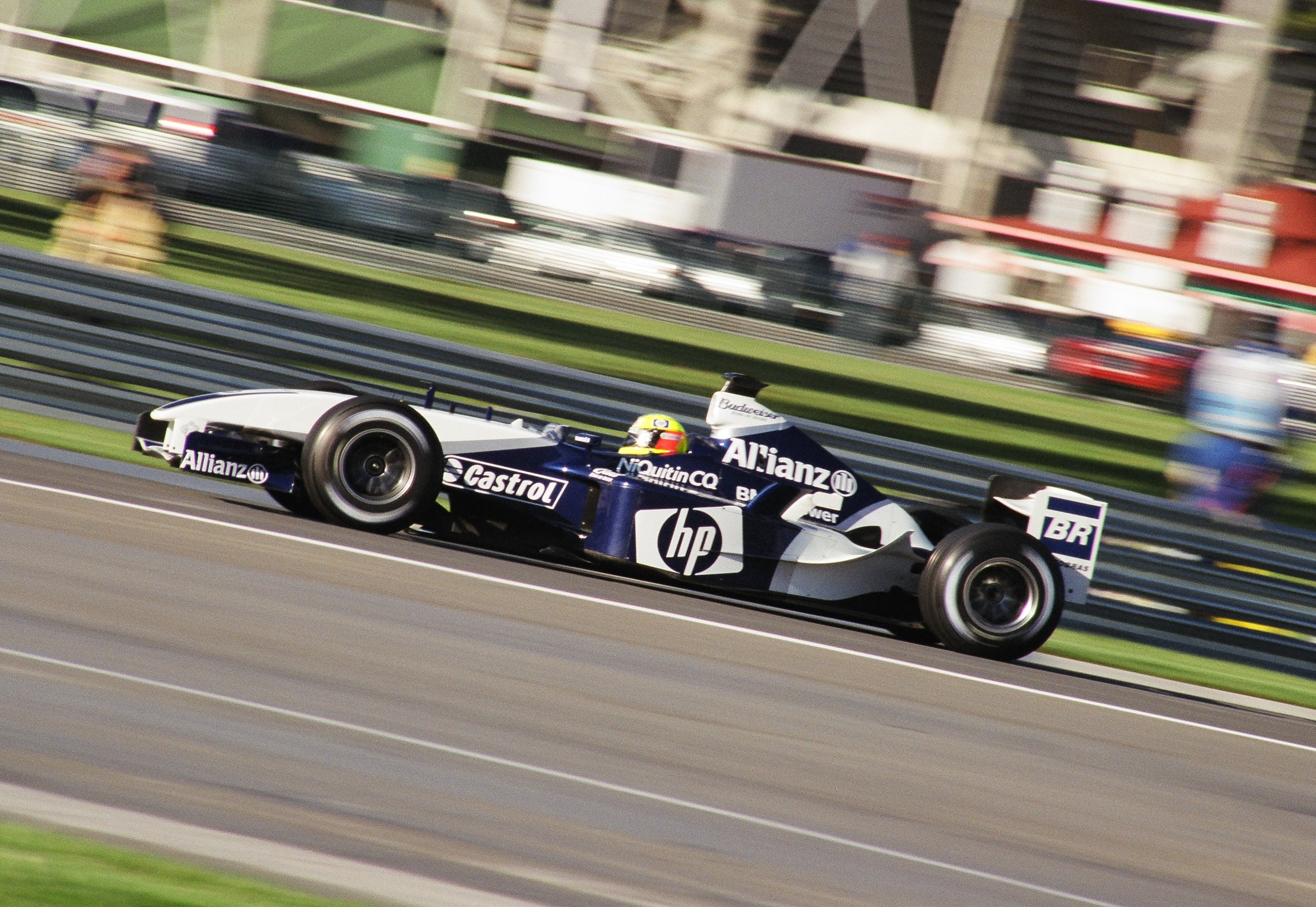
Ralf Schumacher at the 2003 United States Grand Prix. The 2003 season was the most successful of Williams' six seasons using BMW engines.

After the relatively conservative E41, BMW designed the more aggressive P80 engine for 2001, a basic type number that was maintained for the remainder of the company's involvement in Formula One. The engine immediately proved to have a significant power improvement, and propelled Schumacher and new teammate Juan Pablo Montoya into contention for race victories. In all, the two drivers scored four race wins, but lost other opportunities through unreliability and racing incidents. The FW23 chassis also lacked the ultimate downforce to compete with the Ferrari and McLaren drivers at every circuit, although it was the class of the field at "power circuits" such as Hockenheim and Monza.

For 2002, the reliability and consistency of the FW24 chassis was much improved, but Ferrari made a more significant step forward with its own F2002 chassis and dominated both championships. The team scored twelve more points than in the previous year and beat McLaren to second place in the Constructors' Championship, but only won a single race with Schumacher at the Malaysian Grand Prix. Moreover, Montoya was unable to win a single race, despite taking seven pole positions.

The Williams team was more competitive in 2003, as both drivers won on two occasions and Montoya remained in contention for the Drivers' Championship until the penultimate race of the season. However, he ultimately fell short, as did the team in the Constructors' Championship, as although the FW25 was often the car to beat in the second half of the season, it took too much time to reach this point.

For 2004, the team produced the FW26 chassis, which featured a radical nose section designed by Antonia Terzi. This design proved ineffective, however, in another year of Ferrari dominance, and Williams slipped to fourth in the Constructors' Championship, with Montoya's victory in the Brazilian Grand Prix its sole win in the 2004 season. Before this result, the team had suffered the embarrassment of a double disqualification from the Canadian Grand Prix due to brake duct irregularities, and then Schumacher sustaining spinal injuries as a result of a high-speed crash at the United States Grand Prix, which caused him to miss six races until he recovered. Both drivers left the team at the end of the season.

The final year of BMW's association with Williams, 2005, saw the team's decline in competitiveness continue, dropping to fifth in the Constructors' Championship. None of the team's three drivers—Mark Webber, Nick Heidfeld and Antônio Pizzonia—were able to win a race; the team's best result was a double podium finish at the Monaco Grand Prix. By this time, the team's relationship with its engine supplier had deteriorated, with BMW believing that its engines were capable of winning championships but were being let down by the Williams chassis they were powering. BMW offered to buy the team outright in the hope of gaining overall control of its Formula One endeavours, but Frank Williams refused; as a result, BMW chose to buy the rival Sauber team instead for 2006 and end its deal with Williams.

== BMW Sauber ==
BMW Sauber
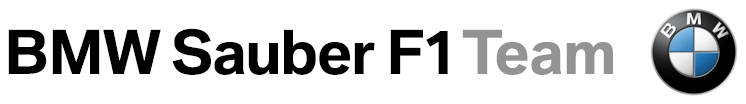
- Full name: BMW Sauber F1 Team
- Base: Hinwil, Switzerland
- Noted staff: Mario Theissen; Peter Sauber; Willy Rampf; Mike Krack
- Noted drivers: (Germany) Nick Heidfeld (Poland) Robert Kubica (Germany) Sebastian Vettel (Canada) Jacques Villeneuve

Formula One World Championship career
- First entry: 2006 Bahrain Grand Prix
- Races entered: 70
- Constructors' Championships: 0 (Best finish: 2nd – 2007)
- Drivers' Championships: 0 (Best finish: 4th – Robert Kubica, 2008)
- Race victories: 1
- Podiums: 17
- Pole positions: 1
- Fastest laps: 2
- Final entry: 2009 Abu Dhabi Grand Prix

BMW bought Swiss team Sauber in June 2005 to form the BMW Sauber F1 Team (initially BMW planned to utilize BMW F1 Team naming). The takeover came after BMW's relationship with Williams had deteriorated in the previous months, the partnership ending at the end of the 2005 season. The team, operated under a German racing licence, was based at Sauber's headquarters in Hinwil, Switzerland and BMW's headquarters in Munich, Germany. BMW retained Sauber naming for 2006 to 2009 seasons due to historical reasons despite BMW ownership.

The team scored two podium finishes and came fifth in 2006, its first season in Formula One. This was followed by a second place in 2007 after the McLaren team had been excluded from the championship. Robert Kubica took the team's only Grand Prix victory at the 2008 Canadian Grand Prix. Following a poor 2009 season, BMW withdrew from Formula One and sold the team back to founder Peter Sauber.

=== 2006 ===
For the 2006 season, BMW Sauber signed Nick Heidfeld from Williams to be the lead driver, while 1997 World Champion Jacques Villeneuve had his existing two-year contract with Sauber honoured. Robert Kubica was signed as the team's third driver. The team continued to use Sauber's facilities, mostly for chassis construction and wind tunnel testing, while BMW's headquarters in Munich were responsible for building the new 2.4-litre P86 V8 engine, revised technical regulations forcing a change from the 3-litre V10 formula. This replaced the Petronas-badged Ferrari engines which the team had used since 1997. The Sauber team's existing major sponsors, Petronas and Credit Suisse, renewed their contracts with BMW. The team also announced a technical partnership with technology company Intel. The team's new livery, which was maintained throughout its tenure in Formula One, consisted of the traditional BMW blue and white with a hint of red.

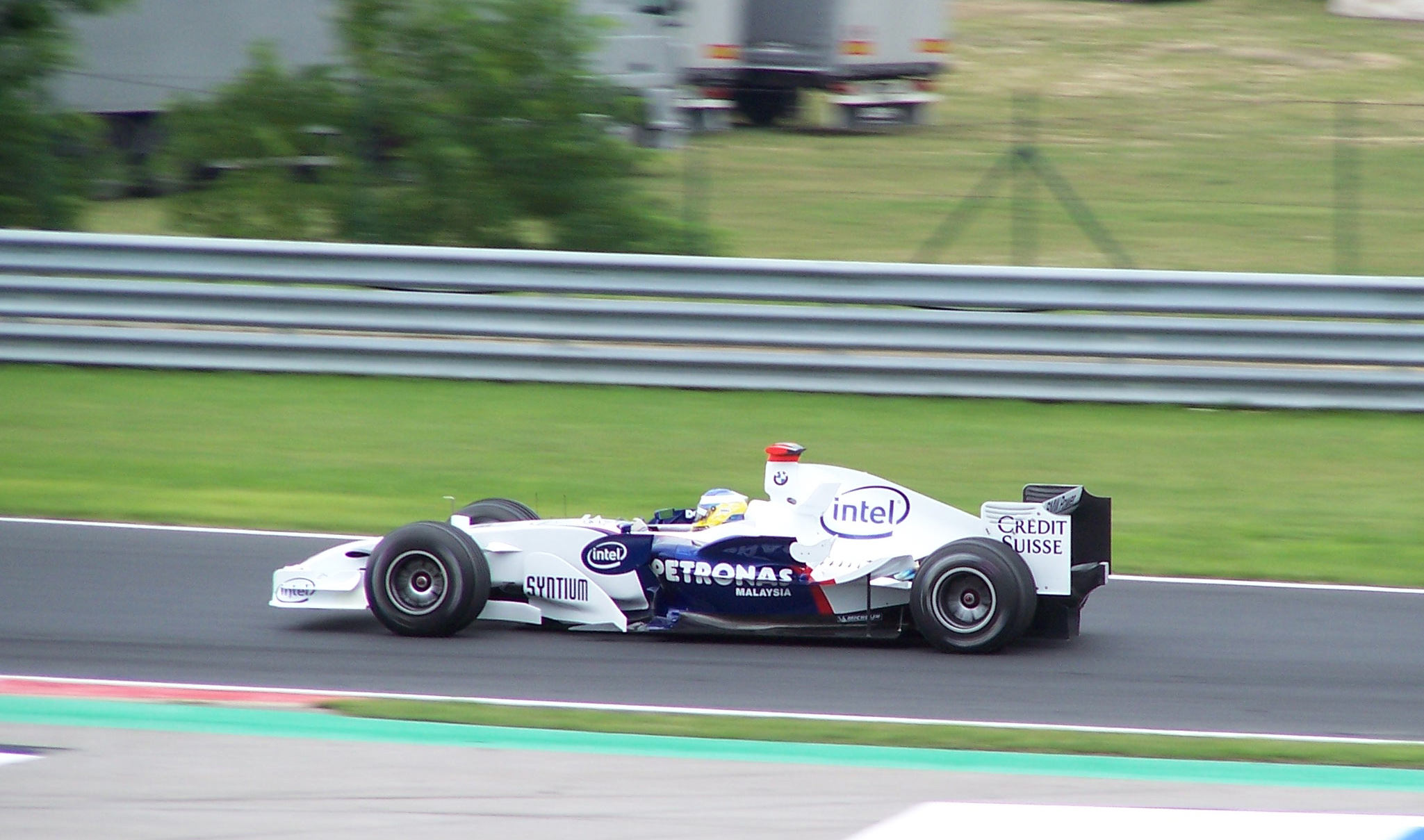
Nick Heidfeld took the team's first podium finish at the 2006 Hungarian Grand Prix.

Villeneuve scored the team's first points with a seventh-place finish at the Malaysian Grand Prix, after Heidfeld retired from fifth with an engine failure late in the race. Over the first two thirds of the season the drivers picked up points with a succession of seventh and eighth-place finishes, plus a fourth-place finish for Heidfeld at the Australian Grand Prix. The team ran a radical "twin towers" aero enhancement on the front of the car for the French Grand Prix, which was meant to improve the flow of air over the top of the chassis. The parts were promptly banned by the Fédération Internationale de l'Automobile (FIA) as they were adjudged to impede the drivers' vision and thus compromise safety.

Heidfeld scored the team's first podium finish at the Hungarian Grand Prix from tenth on the grid. This race also saw the début of Robert Kubica, who replaced Villeneuve after the latter had crashed heavily at the preceding German Grand Prix. Kubica finished seventh, although he was later disqualified after his car was found to be underweight. The official reason for Villeneuve's absence was that he was recovering from his previous accident, but the team later announced that the driver change was permanent. Kubica scored BMW Sauber's second podium finish of the season at the Italian Grand Prix, after running in third place for most of the race and leading briefly during the first round of pit stops while Heidfeld finished in eighth. The team scored a total of 36 points to finish fifth in the Constructors' Championship, an improvement on Sauber's eighth position with 20 points in 2005.

=== 2007 ===
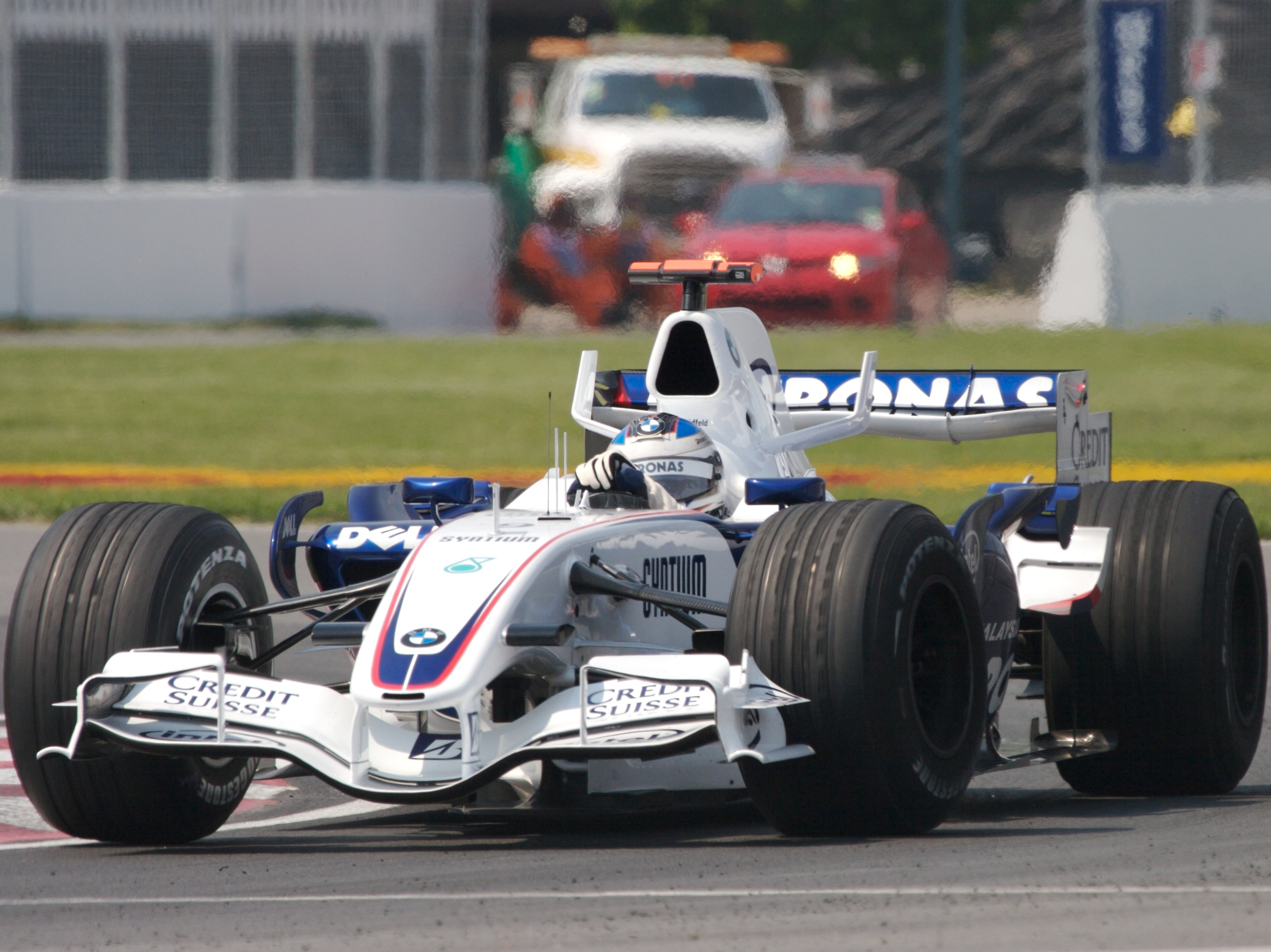
Heidfeld took BMW Sauber's best result of 2007 with second place at the Canadian Grand Prix.

On 19 October 2006, BMW announced that Robert Kubica would partner Nick Heidfeld for the 2007 Formula One season with Sebastian Vettel taking the test and reserve driver role. Timo Glock was later signed as the team's second test driver. The team launched its 2007 car, the F1.07, on January 16, 2007.

The new car showed promising form throughout winter testing, topping the times sheets on occasions. However, team principal Mario Theissen declared some reliability concerns before the season's opening race in Australia. Kubica retired from fourth place with a gearbox problem, but Heidfeld took over the position and held it to the end of the race. In the early races of the season, Heidfeld and Kubica scored a series of points finishes and established BMW Sauber as the third-fastest team, behind Ferrari and McLaren. Theissen also made the point that the performance gap between BMW Sauber and the two top teams was less than the gap between BMW Sauber and the teams behind it.

The Canadian Grand Prix brought mixed fortunes for the team. While Heidfeld scored BMW Sauber's best result thus far with a second-place finish, Kubica suffered a huge crash that resulted in a long safety car period. The media was initially told Kubica had broken his leg, but it later proved that he had escaped with only a sprained ankle and concussion. Vettel took his place in the United States Grand Prix, finishing in eighth place and therefore becoming the youngest driver to score a Formula One World Championship point. Later in the season, Vettel moved teams to take a race seat at the Toro Rosso team.

Kubica returned to racing action at the French Grand Prix and proved his recovery by finishing in fourth position. Over the remainder of the season, he and Heidfeld continued their form to score a total of 101 points, which secured the team second in the Constructors' Championship after McLaren's disqualification. Heidfeld scored another podium finish at the Hungarian Grand Prix and scored 61 points to Kubica's 39, while Vettel's sole appearance produced an additional point.

=== 2008 ===
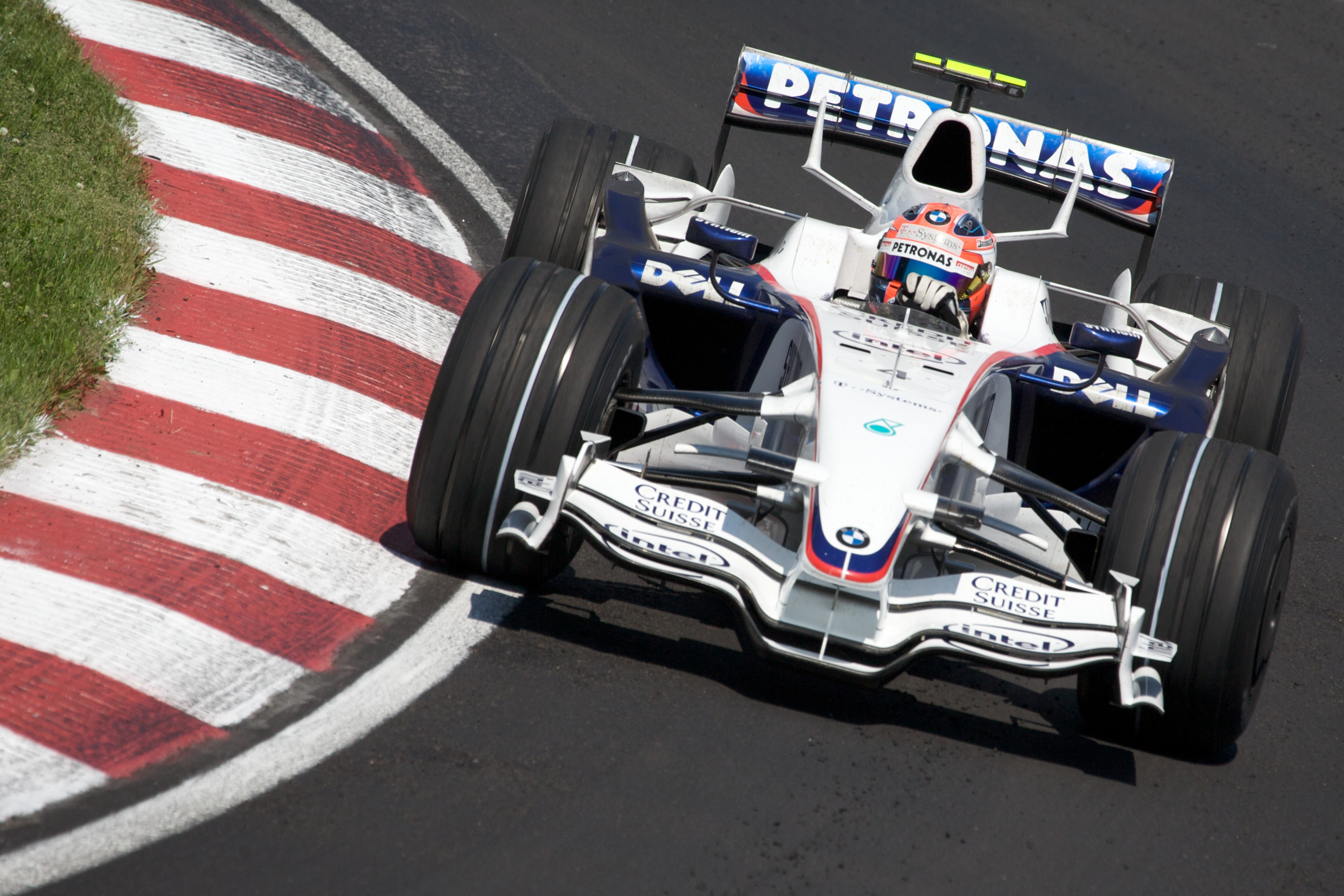
The Canadian Grand Prix saw Robert Kubica win his and BMW Sauber's first race.

On August 21, 2007, BMW confirmed its driver line-up of Heidfeld and Kubica for the 2008 season. Their 2008 car, the F1.08 was officially launched in Munich at BMW Welt on January 14, 2008. It made its track debut at Valencia the next day, with Robert Kubica driving. Team principal Mario Theissen set the target of the team's first win.

BMW Sauber started the season well with Kubica narrowly missing out on pole after a mistake in his main qualifying lap in Melbourne. He later retired after being hit by Kazuki Nakajima but Heidfeld finished second. Kubica took second in Malaysia, with Heidfeld in 6th setting the fastest lap of the race. The team's points total of 11 was their largest score up to that time. In Bahrain, Kubica scored his and the team's first ever pole position, beating Felipe Massa by just under three hundredths of a second. The team went on to finish 3rd and 4th in the race, equalling their highest round points total and promoting them to first place in the constructors' championship for the first time.

The team also attained a second-place finish in the Monaco Grand Prix with Robert Kubica, beating both Ferraris and only trailing the McLaren of Lewis Hamilton by three seconds.

BMW Sauber's first race victory came in the 2008 Canadian Grand Prix, the team achieving a one-two finish with Robert Kubica's first race win and Nick Heidfeld taking second place. The victory came after Lewis Hamilton collided with Kimi Räikkönen in the pitlane, ending the race for both drivers. Kubica was on a different refueling strategy from Heidfeld, who also briefly led the race before securing the one-two finish for BMW Sauber in comfortable fashion.

After the team's breakthrough win, development was switched to the 2009 season where new regulations come into play. This greatly annoyed Kubica, (who was leading the championship after the Canadian Grand Prix), as he felt they could have had a realistic chance of taking at least one title. The lack of development was reflected with a drop of form throughout the second half of the season, causing BMW to be outpaced by Renault, Toyota and even Toro Rosso (who started the season as one of the slowest teams) by the end of the season. Despite this, Kubica remained with an outside chance of taking the drivers championship until the Chinese Grand Prix, the 17th round out of 18.

In October the team confirmed that they would stick with Robert Kubica and Nick Heidfeld as their drivers for the 2009 Season.

=== 2009 ===
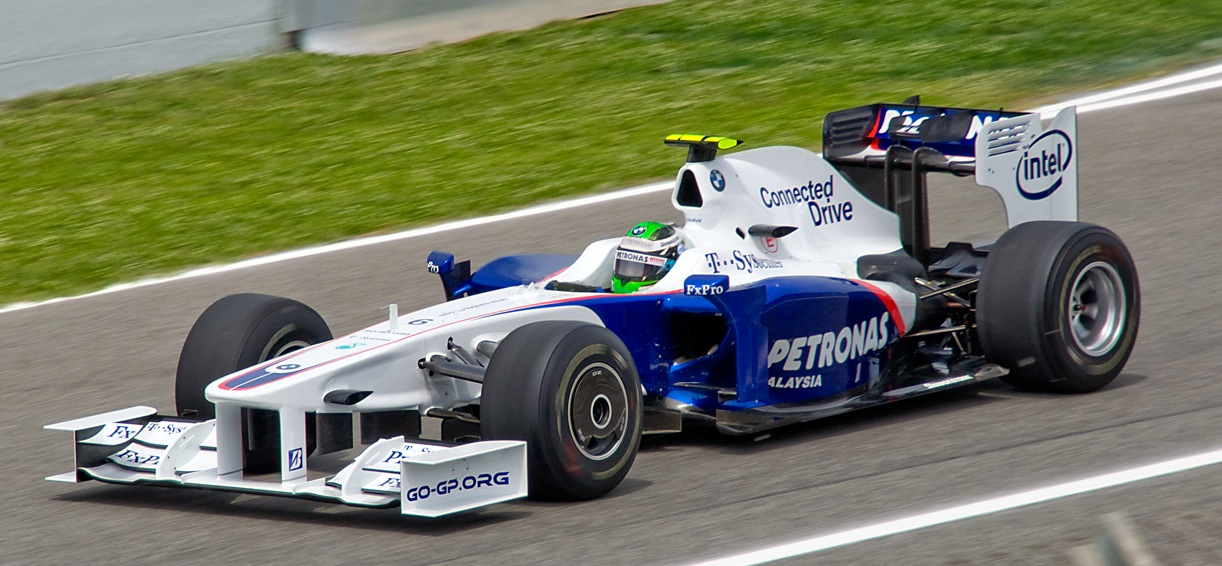
The poor performance of the F1.09 chassis contributed to BMW's withdrawal from Formula One at the end of the season.

Although BMW Sauber targeted the 2009 season as the year they would challenge for the title, their start to the season was a disappointment. Kubica was running in 3rd place in the opening round when he collided with Vettel while battling for 2nd place and was forced to retire. Heidfeld then secured the team's first podium of the year in Malaysia, but after 6 races BMW Sauber had collected a mere 6 points, and occupied 8th place in the Constructors' Championship out of 10 teams. A raft of upgrades were set for Turkey, including an improved regenerative braking system (KERS) and a double deck diffuser. While the new diffuser was implemented, the KERS could not be made to fit the new car and both drivers raced without the device. After the qualifying session for the British Grand Prix Mario Theissen announced that the team had decided to halt further development KERS; of which BMW had been one of the strongest proponents, and focus instead on improving the car's aerodynamics. This left Ferrari and McLaren as the only remaining users of the KERS system. In the European Grand Prix at Valencia Robert Kubica scored the team's first points since the race in Turkey.

Following a meeting of the BMW board on July 28, the company held at press conference the following morning in which it confirmed the team's withdrawal from Formula One at the end of 2009. Chairman Norbert Reithofer described the decision as a strategic one. The Formula One Teams Association released a statement in response pledging its support to help the team remain in F1.

On 15 September 2009 it was announced that BMW Sauber had secured a buyer, Qadbak Investments Limited which said to represent European and Middle Eastern interests. However Lotus had been given the 13th and final slot in the 2010 Championship. The team were awarded what was termed a 14th entry, which hinged either on another team dropping out or all the other teams agreeing to allow 28 cars to enter the 2010 Championship.

On November 22, Swiss newspaper SonntagsZeitung revealed that Qadbak's attempt to purchase the team had failed as it did not have the necessary funds. Qadbak turned out to be a shell company with no assets and no investors behind it. On November 27, 2009, it was announced that Peter Sauber would repurchase the team conditional upon the team receiving a FIA entry for the 2010 season. The FIA subsequently granted Sauber an entry on December 3, after Toyota had left the sport. The team used Ferrari engines in 2010.

== Formula One customer engine results (1952–2005) ==
Entrant	Season(s)	Total wins	First win	Last win	Pole positions	First pole	Last pole
(United Kingdom) Frazer Nash	1952	0	-	-	0	-	-
(West Germany) Ernst Klodwig	1952–1953	0	-	-	0	-	-
(East Germany) Rudolf Krause	1952	0	-	-	0	-	-
(Germany) "Bernhard Nacke"	1952	0	-	-	0	-	-
(Germany) Willi Krakau	1952	0	-	-	0	-	-
(France) Marcel Balsa	1952	0	-	-	0	-	-
(Germany) Dora Greifzu	1953	0	-	-	0	-	-
(Germany) Hans Klenk	1954	0	-	-	0	-	-
(West Germany) Bayerische Motoren Werke	1967–1968	0	-	-	0	-	-
(United Kingdom) Lola Racing Ltd	1967	0	-	-	0	-	-
(United Kingdom) Brabham	1981–1987	8	1982 Canadian Grand Prix	1985 French Grand Prix	13	1982 Austrian Grand Prix	1985 Dutch Grand Prix
(West Germany) ATS	1983–1984	0	-	-	0	-	-
(United Kingdom) Arrows	1984–1988†	0	-	-	0	-	-
(United Kingdom) Benetton	1986	1	1986 Mexican Grand Prix	1986 Mexican Grand Prix	2	1986 Austrian Grand Prix	1986 Italian Grand Prix
(France) Ligier	1987†	0	-	-	0	-	-
(United Kingdom) Williams	2000–2005	10	2001 San Marino Grand Prix	2004 Brazilian Grand Prix	17	2001 French Grand Prix	2005 European Grand Prix
Total	1952–2005	19	1982 Canadian Grand Prix	2004 Brazilian Grand Prix	32	1982 Austrian Grand Prix	2005 European Grand Prix

* Excludes factory team.
† BMW engine re-badged as Megatron in 1987 and 1988.

== See also ==
- BMW in motorsport
