= 1952 Swiss Grand Prix =

← Previous race	Next race →
- Circuit Bremgarten track layout

Race details
- Date: 18 May 1952
- Official name: XII Großer Preis der Schweiz
- Location: Circuit Bremgarten, Bern, Switzerland
- Course: Temporary street/road circuit
- Course length: 7.280 km (4.524 miles)
- Distance: 62 laps, 451.360 km (280.462 miles)
- Weather: Sunny

Pole position
Driver	(Italy) Giuseppe Farina	Ferrari
- Time: 2:47.5

Fastest lap
Driver	(Italy) Piero Taruffi	Ferrari
- Time: 2:49.1 on lap 46

Podium
First	(Italy) Piero Taruffi	Ferrari
Second	(Switzerland) Rudi Fischer	Ferrari
Third	(France) Jean Behra	Gordini

The 1952 Swiss Grand Prix was a Formula Two race held on 18 May 1952 at Bremgarten Circuit. It was the first round of the 1952 World Championship of Drivers, in which each Grand Prix was run to Formula Two rules rather than the Formula One regulations normally used.

Italian driver Piero Taruffi scored his only win in a World Championship race, driving for Ferrari.

== Supporting races ==
The 1952 Swiss motorcycle Grand Prix races on the fast circuit in the Bremgartenwald forest were marred by a number of accidents that resulted in the deaths of two competitors, Ercole Frigerio and Dave Bennett.

The sports car race 1952 Bern Grand Prix had factory entries from Aston Martin, Ferrari, Lancia, and no less than four Mercedes-Benz 300 SL that dominated the race, finishing 1-2-3 after 18 laps, lapping the field. Pre-WWII Grand Prix greats and rivals Hermann Lang and Rudolf Caracciola took part and duelled, and towards the end of the race it was Swiss resident Caracciola whose brakes locked up going into a corner; the car skidded off the road and hit a tree. Caracciola survived with a broken leg, but this crash effectively ended his racing career despite hopes in July that he would race the 300SL at the 1952 German Grand Prix "Großer Jubiläumspreis vom Nürburgring" (25th anniversary) support race.

== Report ==
With the withdrawal of Alfa Romeo from the World Championship, Ferrari were left as the sole competitive team under the existing Formula One regulations which allowed 1.5 litre supercharged engines, or 4.5 litre normal. It was therefore decided to restrict the World Championship Grand Prix races to Formula Two cars with 2 litre engines offered by many more brands.

The works Ferrari team brought three drivers to the Swiss Grand Prix, namely Farina, Taruffi and Simon. Regular Ferrari drivers Alberto Ascari and Luigi Villoresi were both unavailable, the former due to his participation in the Indianapolis 500, and the latter because of his having had a road accident. Also running Ferraris were Rudi Fischer and Peter Hirt of Ecurie Espadon, and veteran Frenchman Louis Rosier. Gordini also had a three-car team for this race, consisting of Robert Manzon, B. Bira and the debutant Jean Behra. The HWM team, returning to the World Championship for the first time since the previous race at Bremgarten, fielded the all-British quartet of Abecassis, Collins, Macklin and Moss. Maserati had planned to enter defending World Drivers' Champion Juan Manuel Fangio and fellow Argentinian José Froilán González, but this did not come into fruition. Completing the field were the sole AFM entry of Hans Stuck and a number of privately run cars representing various constructors.

Former Alfa Romeo driver Nino Farina took pole position, alongside Taruffi and Manzon on the front row of the grid. Simon and Fischer started from the second row, in front of Collins, Behra and Toulo de Graffenried, who was driving an Enrico Platé-entered Maserati.

Polesitter Farina led the race until his car broke down. His Ferrari teammate assumed the lead, which he held for the remainder of the race. Moss was impressively running in third place in the early stages, behind Farina and Taruffi, before he had to stop. Moss and Macklin withdrew from the race. The main battle was between Behra and Simon, for second place (once Farina had retired). When Behra had to stop, due to his exhaust pipe having fallen off, Farina, who had taken over Simon's car, assumed second place. However, further problems meant that he once again had to retire, on lap 51, handing second to local driver Rudi Fischer. The Swiss driver took his first Championship podium, being the only driver not to be lapped by Taruffi, who took his first (and only) World Championship race victory. Behra completed the podium, taking third on debut, while Ken Wharton (fourth) and Alan Brown (fifth) took the first points finishes for Frazer Nash and Cooper, respectively.

== Entries ==
No	Driver	Entrant	Constructor	Chassis	Engine	Tyre
2	(West Germany) Hans Stuck	AFM	AFM-Küchen	AFM 6	Küchen 2.0 V8	E
4	(West Germany) Toni Ulmen	Toni Ulmen	Veritas	Veritas Meteor	Veritas 2.0 L6	D
6	(France) Jean Behra	Equipe Gordini	Gordini	Gordini T16	Gordini 20 2.0 L6	E
8	(France) Robert Manzon	Equipe Gordini	Gordini	Gordini T16	Gordini 20 2.0 L6	E
10	(Thailand) Prince Bira	Equipe Gordini	Simca-Gordini	Simca-Gordini T15	Gordini 1500 1.5 L4	E
12	(France) Louis Rosier	Ecurie Rosier	Ferrari	Ferrari 500	Ferrari Type 500 2.0 L4	D
14	(France) Maurice Trintignant	Ecurie Rosier	Ferrari	Ferrari 166F2-50	Ferrari 166 2.0 V12	P
16	(United Kingdom) George Abecassis	HW Motors	HWM-Alta	HWM 52	Alta F2 2.0 L4	D
18	(United Kingdom) Peter Collins	HW Motors	HWM-Alta	HWM 52	Alta F2 2.0 L4	D
20	(United Kingdom) Lance Macklin	HW Motors	HWM-Alta	HWM 52	Alta F2 2.0 L4	D
22	(United Kingdom) Ken Wharton	Scuderia Franera	Frazer Nash-Bristol	Frazer Nash FN48	Bristol BS1 2.0 L6	D
24	(United Kingdom) Eric Brandon	Ecurie Richmond	Cooper-Bristol	Cooper T20	Bristol BS1 2.0 L6	D
26	(United Kingdom) Alan Brown	Ecurie Richmond	Cooper-Bristol	Cooper T20	Bristol BS1 2.0 L6	D
28	(Italy) Nino Farina	Scuderia Ferrari	Ferrari	Ferrari 500	Ferrari Type 500 2.0 L4	P
30	(Italy) Piero Taruffi	Scuderia Ferrari	Ferrari	Ferrari 500	Ferrari Type 500 2.0 L4	P
32	(France) André Simon^{1}	Scuderia Ferrari	Ferrari	Ferrari 500	Ferrari Type 500 2.0 L4	P
34	(Argentina) Juan Manuel Fangio^{2}	Officine Alfieri Maserati	Maserati	Maserati A6GCM	Maserati A6G 2.0 L6	P
36	(Argentina) José Froilán González^{2}	Officine Alfieri Maserati	Maserati	Maserati A6GCM	Maserati A6G 2.0 L6	P
38	(Switzerland) Toulo de Graffenried	Enrico Platé	Maserati-Platé	Maserati 4CLT-48	Platé 2.0 L4	P
40	(United States) Harry Schell	Enrico Platé	Maserati-Platé	Maserati 4CLT-48	Platé 2.0 L4	P
42	(Switzerland) Rudi Fischer	Ecurie Espadon	Ferrari	Ferrari 500	Ferrari Type 500 2.0 L4	P
44	(Switzerland) Peter Hirt^{3}	Ecurie Espadon	Ferrari	Ferrari 212	Ferrari 166 2.0 V12	P
46	(United Kingdom) Stirling Moss	HW Motors	HWM-Alta	HWM 52	Alta F2 2.0 L4	D
50	(Switzerland) Max de Terra^{4}	Alfred Dattner	Simca-Gordini	Simca-Gordini T11	Gordini 1500 1.5 L4	E

^1 — André Simon qualified and drove 21 laps of the race in the #32 Ferrari. Nino Farina, whose own vehicle had already retired, took over the car for a further 30 laps before again being forced to retire.
^2 — Juan Manuel Fangio and José Froilán González, whose cars were unavailable, withdrew from the event prior to practice.
^3 — Peter Hirt qualified and drove the entire race in the #44 Ferrari. Rudolf Schoeller, named substitute driver for the car, was not used during the Grand Prix.
^4 — Max de Terra drove the #50 Simca-Gordini in the race. Alfred Dattner, who was also entered in the same car, was unable to take part in the Grand Prix due to illness.

== Classification ==
=== Qualifying ===
Pos	No	Driver	Constructor	Time	Gap
1	28	(Italy) Nino Farina	Ferrari	2:47.5	–
2	30	(Italy) Piero Taruffi	Ferrari	2:50.1	+ 2.6
3	8	(France) Robert Manzon	Gordini	2:52.1	+ 4.6
4	32	(France) André Simon	Ferrari	2:52.4	+ 4.9
5	42	(Switzerland) Rudi Fischer	Ferrari	2:53.3	+ 5.8
6	18	(United Kingdom) Peter Collins	HWM-Alta	2:55.9	+ 8.4
7	6	(France) Jean Behra	Gordini	2:55.9	+ 8.4
8	38	(Switzerland) Toulo de Graffenried	Maserati-Platé	2:56.4	+ 8.9
9	46	(United Kingdom) Stirling Moss	HWM-Alta	2:56.4	+ 8.9
10	16	(United Kingdom) George Abecassis	HWM-Alta	2:56.9	+ 9.4
11	10	(Thailand) Prince Bira	Simca-Gordini	2:59.3	+ 11.8
12	20	(United Kingdom) Lance Macklin	HWM-Alta	3:00.2	+ 12.7
13	22	(United Kingdom) Ken Wharton	Frazer Nash-Bristol	3:00.9	+ 13.4
14	2	(West Germany) Hans Stuck	AFM	3:01.7	+ 14.2
15	26	(United Kingdom) Alan Brown	Cooper-Bristol	3:02.5	+ 15.0
16	4	(West Germany) Toni Ulmen	Veritas	3:05.6	+ 18.1
17	24	(United Kingdom) Eric Brandon	Cooper-Bristol	3:05.8	+ 18.3
18	40	(United States) Harry Schell	Maserati-Platé	3:07.6	+ 20.1
19	44	(Switzerland) Peter Hirt	Ferrari	3:10.2	+ 22.7
20	12	(France) Louis Rosier	Ferrari	No time	–
21	50	(Switzerland) Max de Terra	Simca-Gordini	No time	–
22	14	(France) Maurice Trintignant	Ferrari	No time	–

=== Race ===
Pos	No	Driver	Constructor	Laps	Time/Retired	Grid	Points
1	30	(Italy) Piero Taruffi	Ferrari	62	3:01:46.1	2	9^{1}
2	42	(Switzerland) Rudi Fischer	Ferrari	62	+2:37.2	5	6
3	6	(France) Jean Behra	Gordini	61	+1 lap	7	4
4	22	(United Kingdom) Ken Wharton	Frazer Nash-Bristol	60	+2 laps	13	3
5	26	(United Kingdom) Alan Brown	Cooper-Bristol	59	+3 laps	15	2
6	38	(Switzerland) Toulo de Graffenried	Maserati-Platé	58	+4 laps	8	
7	44	(Switzerland) Peter Hirt	Ferrari	56	+6 laps	19	
8	24	(United Kingdom) Eric Brandon	Cooper-Bristol	55	+7 laps	17	
Ret	10	(Thailand) Prince Bira	Simca-Gordini	52	Engine	11	
Ret	32	(France) André Simon (Italy) Nino Farina	Ferrari	51	Magneto	4	
Ret	40	(United States) Harry Schell	Maserati-Platé	31	Engine	18	
Ret	46	(United Kingdom) Stirling Moss	HWM-Alta	24	Withdrew	9	
Ret	20	(United Kingdom) Lance Macklin	HWM-Alta	24	Withdrew	12	
Ret	8	(France) Robert Manzon	Gordini	20	Radiator	3	
Ret	28	(Italy) Nino Farina	Ferrari	16	Magneto	1	
Ret	18	(United Kingdom) Peter Collins	HWM-Alta	12	Halfshaft	6	
Ret	16	(United Kingdom) George Abecassis	HWM-Alta	12	Halfshaft	10	
Ret	2	(West Germany) Hans Stuck	AFM	4	Engine	14	
Ret	4	(West Germany) Toni Ulmen	Veritas	4	Fuel leak	16	
Ret	12	(France) Louis Rosier	Ferrari	2	Accident	20	
Ret	50	(Switzerland) Max de Terra	Simca-Gordini	1	Magneto	21	
DNS	14	(France) Maurice Trintignant	Ferrari	0	Engine	22	

Notes

- ^1 – Includes 1 point for fastest lap

== Shared drive ==
- Farina (33 laps) took over from Simon (18) after Farina retired from the race.

== Championship standings after the race ==
Drivers' Championship standings

Pos	Driver	Points
1	(Italy) Piero Taruffi	9
2	(Switzerland) Rudi Fischer	6
3	(France) Jean Behra	4
4	(United Kingdom) Ken Wharton	3
5	(United Kingdom) Alan Brown	2

- Note: Only the top five positions are listed. Only the best 4 results counted towards the Championship.

Previous race: 1951 Spanish Grand Prix	FIA Formula One World Championship; 1952 season	Next race: 1952 Indianapolis 500
Previous race: 1951 Swiss Grand Prix	Swiss Grand Prix	Next race: 1953 Swiss Grand Prix
