= 1952 French Grand Prix =

← Previous race	Next race →
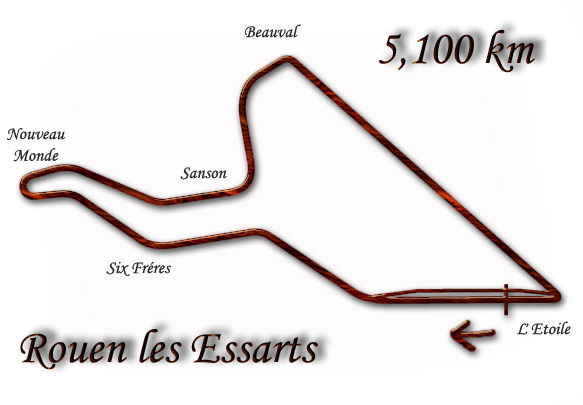

Race details
- Date: 6 July 1952
- Official name: XXXIX Grand Prix de l'ACF
- Location: Rouen-Les-Essarts, Grand-Couronne, France
- Course: Permanent racing facility
- Course length: 5.100 km (3.169 miles)
- Distance: 77 laps, 392.700 km (244.012 miles)
- Weather: Rain

Pole position
Driver	(Italy) Alberto Ascari	Ferrari
- Time: 2:14.8

Fastest lap
Driver	(Italy) Alberto Ascari	Ferrari
- Time: 2:17.3 on lap 28

Podium
First	(Italy) Alberto Ascari	Ferrari
Second	(Italy) Giuseppe Farina	Ferrari
Third	(Italy) Piero Taruffi	Ferrari

The 1952 French Grand Prix was a Formula Two race held on 6 July 1952 at Rouen-Les-Essarts. It was race 4 of 8 in the 1952 World Championship of Drivers, in which each Grand Prix was run to Formula Two rules rather than the Formula One regulations normally used. Unusually this race was run over a duration of 3 hours, rather than a fixed distance, and featured the largest age gap between two starters (34 years, 10 months, and 9 days between Philippe Étancelin and Peter Collins) of any World Championship round.

== Report ==
Having won the previous weekend's Grand Prix de la Marne, Jean Behra, racing for Equipe Gordini, was among the favourites for the first French Grand Prix to be held at Rouen-Les-Essarts. Also driving for Gordini were regulars Robert Manzon and Prince Bira, alongside Maurice Trintignant, who replaced Johnny Claes from the lineup for the previous round. Claes entered the race in a Simca-Gordini under his own 'Ecurie Belge' label, which he had used in the 1950 and 1951 seasons. Ferrari retained their lineup of Ascari, Farina and Taruffi, who had locked out the front row of the grid in Belgium. There were also several privateer Ferrari entries: the Swiss duo of Rudi Fischer and Peter Hirt, representing Ecurie Espadon, the Italian pairing of Franco Comotti and Piero Carini, for Scuderia Marzotto, and Louis Rosier. HWM again ran regular drivers Lance Macklin and Peter Collins, this time alongside Frenchman Yves Giraud-Cabantous. While the factory Maserati team remained absent, their new car, the A6GCM, made its World Championship debut, driven by Philippe Étancelin of Escuderia Bandeirantes. Enrico Platé entered a pair of older Maseratis, the 4CLT/48 model, for Toulo de Graffenried and Harry Schell. Completing the grid were Peter Whitehead, in a privately run Alta, and Mike Hawthorn, who again took part in a Cooper-Bristol.

Ascari took his second consecutive pole position, with his Ferrari teammates Farina and Taruffi again joining him on the front row of the grid. The Gordini team locked out the second row, with Behra and Manzon qualifying in fourth and fifth, respectively. Their teammates Trintignant and Bira started from the third row, alongside Peter Collins in the fastest of the HWMs. The new Maserati A6GCM proved a disappointment, with Philippe Étancelin only managing to qualify on the seventh row of the grid (out of eight).

The Ferraris once again dominated the race, with Alberto Ascari leading Farina from start to finish, thus taking his second consecutive victory in the World Championship. Despite a good start from the Gordinis of Manzon and Behra, that saw them take third and fourth place, respectively, by the end of the first lap, Piero Taruffi managed to regain third place on lap 4 and subsequently held it for the remainder of the race, ensuring that it was an all-Ferrari podium. Manzon finished fourth, a lap behind Taruffi, while his teammate Maurice Trintignant took the final points-scoring position of fifth. HWM driver Peter Collins took sixth, two laps behind Trintignant, ahead of Jean Behra, for whom seventh represented something of a recovery, having been in last place at the end of lap 3. His race had been compromised when he crashed and consequently needed to pit.

Ascari's win, and fastest lap, ensured that he took a five-point lead in the Drivers' Championship, ahead of fellow Ferrari driver Piero Taruffi. Farina's second consecutive second-place finish took him to third in the standings, one point adrift of Taruffi. Indianapolis 500 winner Troy Ruttman was a further four points behind in fourth, one point ahead of Gordini driver Robert Manzon.

== Entries ==
No	Driver	Entrant	Constructor	Chassis	Engine	Tyre
2	(France) Robert Manzon	Equipe Gordini	Gordini	Gordini T16	Gordini 20 2.0 L6	E
4	(France) Jean Behra	Equipe Gordini	Gordini	Gordini T16	Gordini 20 2.0 L6	E
6	(Thailand) Prince Bira	Equipe Gordini	Gordini	Gordini T16	Gordini 20 2.0 L6	E
8	(Italy) Alberto Ascari	Scuderia Ferrari	Ferrari	Ferrari 500	Ferrari Type 500 2.0 L4	P
10	(Italy) Nino Farina	Scuderia Ferrari	Ferrari	Ferrari 500	Ferrari Type 500 2.0 L4	P
12	(Italy) Piero Taruffi^{1}	Scuderia Ferrari	Ferrari	Ferrari 500	Ferrari Type 500 2.0 L4	P
14	(France) Louis Rosier	Ecurie Rosier	Ferrari	Ferrari 500	Ferrari Type 500 2.0 L4	D
16	(Switzerland) Toulo de Graffenried^{2}	Enrico Platé	Maserati-Platé	Maserati 4CLT-48	Platé 2.0 L4	P
18	(United States) Harry Schell	Enrico Platé	Maserati-Platé	Maserati 4CLT-48	Platé 2.0 L4	P
20	(United Kingdom) Lance Macklin	HW Motors	HWM-Alta	HWM 52	Alta F2 2.0 L4	D
22	(United Kingdom) Peter Collins	HW Motors	HWM-Alta	HWM 52	Alta F2 2.0 L4	D
24	(France) Yves Giraud-Cabantous	HW Motors	HWM-Alta	HWM 52	Alta F2 2.0 L4	D
26	(United Kingdom) Peter Whitehead	Peter Whitehead	Alta	Alta	Alta F2 2.0 L4	D
28	(France) Philippe Étancelin^{3}	Escuderia Bandeirantes	Maserati	Maserati A6GCM	Maserati A6G 2.0 L6	P
30	(Brazil) Chico Landi^{4}	Escuderia Bandeirantes	Maserati	Maserati A6GCM	Maserati A6G 2.0 L6	P
32	(Belgium) Johnny Claes	Ecurie Belge	Simca-Gordini	Simca-Gordini T15	Gordini 1500 1.5 L4	E
34	(Switzerland) Rudi Fischer^{5}	Ecurie Espadon	Ferrari	Ferrari 500	Ferrari Type 500 2.0 L4	P
36	(Switzerland) Rudi Fischer^{5}	Ecurie Espadon	Ferrari	Ferrari 212	Ferrari 166 2.0 V12	P
38	(Italy) Franco Comotti^{6}	Scuderia Marzotto	Ferrari	Ferrari 166F2-50	Ferrari 166 2.0 V12	P
40	(Italy) Piero Carini^{6}	Scuderia Marzotto	Ferrari	Ferrari 166F2-50	Ferrari 166 2.0 V12	P
42	(United Kingdom) Mike Hawthorn^{6}	Archie Bryde	Cooper-Bristol	Cooper T20	Bristol BS1 2.0 L6	D
44	(France) Maurice Trintignant	Equipe Gordini	Simca-Gordini	Simca-Gordini T15	Gordini 1500 1.5 L4	E

^1 — Piero Taruffi qualified and drove the entire race in the #12 Ferrari. Luigi Villoresi, who was also entered in the same car, was unable to participate due to injury.
^2 — Toulo de Graffenried qualified and drove 26 laps of the race in the #16 Maserati. Harry Schell, whose own vehicle had already retired, took over the car for a further 8 laps before again being forced to retire.
^3 — Philippe Étancelin qualified and drove the entire race in the #28 Maserati. Eitel Cantoni was also entered in the car, but took no part in the Grand Prix after being fired.
^4 — Chico Landi withdrew from the event prior to practice.
^5 — Rudi Fischer qualified and drove 37 laps of the race in the #36 Ferrari. He was initially due to drive the #34 Ferrari 500, but engine problems in practice meant that he instead participated in a 212. Peter Hirt took over the car for the remainder of the race. Rudolf Schoeller, named substitute driver for the car, was not used during the Grand Prix.
^6 — Vittorio Marzotto, Sergio Sighinolfi and Reg Parnell were the designated substitute drivers for cars #38, #40 and #42, respectively. None of the three was used during the Grand Prix.

== Classification ==
=== Qualifying ===
Pos	No	Driver	Constructor	Time	Gap
1	8	(Italy) Alberto Ascari	Ferrari	2:14.8	–
2	10	(Italy) Nino Farina	Ferrari	2:16.2	+ 1.4
3	12	(Italy) Piero Taruffi	Ferrari	2:17.1	+ 2.3
4	4	(France) Jean Behra	Gordini	2:19.3	+ 4.5
5	2	(France) Robert Manzon	Gordini	2:20.4	+ 5.6
6	44	(France) Maurice Trintignant	Simca-Gordini-Gordini	2:21.6	+ 6.8
7	22	(United Kingdom) Peter Collins	HWM-Alta	2:21.9	+ 7.1
8	6	(Thailand) Prince Bira	Gordini	2:23.0	+ 8.2
9	14	(France) Louis Rosier	Ferrari	2:27.0	+ 12.2
10	24	(France) Yves Giraud-Cabantous	HWM-Alta	2:27.5	+ 12.7
11	16	(Switzerland) Toulo de Graffenried	Maserati	2:28.6	+ 13.8
12	18	(United States) Harry Schell	Maserati	2:29.0	+ 14.2
13	26	(United Kingdom) Peter Whitehead	Alta	2:29.5	+ 14.7
14	20	(United Kingdom) Lance Macklin	HWM-Alta	2:30.9	+ 16.1
15	42	(United Kingdom) Mike Hawthorn	Cooper-Bristol	2:32.0	+ 17.2
16	28	(France) Philippe Étancelin	Maserati	2:33.7	+ 18.9
17	36	(Switzerland) Rudi Fischer	Ferrari	2:34.6	+ 19.8
18	38	(Italy) Franco Comotti	Ferrari	2:36.0	+ 21.2
19	40	(Italy) Piero Carini	Ferrari	2:37.7	+ 22.9
20	32	(Belgium) Johnny Claes	Simca-Gordini-Gordini	2:39.6	+ 24.8

=== Race ===
Pos	No	Driver	Constructor	Laps	Time/Retired	Grid	Points
1	8	(Italy) Alberto Ascari	Ferrari	77	3:02:42.6	1	9^{1}
2	10	(Italy) Nino Farina	Ferrari	76	+ 1 lap	2	6
3	12	(Italy) Piero Taruffi	Ferrari	75	+ 2 laps	3	4
4	2	(France) Robert Manzon	Gordini	74	+ 3 laps	5	3
5	44	(France) Maurice Trintignant	Simca-Gordini-Gordini	72	+ 5 laps	6	2
6	22	(United Kingdom) Peter Collins	HWM-Alta	70	+ 7 laps	8	
7	4	(France) Jean Behra	Gordini	70	+ 7 laps	4	
8	28	(France) Philippe Étancelin	Maserati	70	+ 7 laps	18	
9	20	(United Kingdom) Lance Macklin	HWM-Alta	70	+ 7 laps	14	
10	24	(France) Yves Giraud Cabantous	HWM-Alta	68	+ 9 laps	10	
11	36	(Switzerland) Rudi Fischer (Switzerland) Peter Hirt	Ferrari	66	+ 11 laps	17	
12	38	(Italy) Franco Comotti	Ferrari	63	+ 14 laps	16	
Ret	6	(Thailand) Prince Bira	Gordini	56	Axle	7	
Ret	42	(United Kingdom) Mike Hawthorn	Cooper-Bristol	51	Ignition	15	
Ret	16	(Switzerland) Toulo de Graffenried (United States) Harry Schell	Maserati	34	Brakes	12	
Ret	26	(United Kingdom) Peter Whitehead	Alta	17	Clutch	13	
Ret	14	(France) Louis Rosier	Ferrari	17	Engine	9	
Ret	32	(Belgium) Johnny Claes	Simca-Gordini-Gordini	15	Engine	20	
Ret	18	(United States) Harry Schell	Maserati	7	Gearbox	11	
Ret	40	(Italy) Piero Carini	Ferrari	2	Engine	19	
DNS	34	(Switzerland) Rudi Fischer	Ferrari	0	Engine		

Notes

- ^1 – Includes 1 point for fastest lap

== Shared drives ==
- Car #34: Fischer (33 laps) then Hirt (33 laps)
- Car #16: de Graffenried (20 laps) then Schell (14 laps)

== Championship standings after the race ==
Drivers' Championship standings

	Pos	Driver	Points
1	1	(Italy) Alberto Ascari	18
1	2	(Italy) Piero Taruffi	13
1	3	(Italy) Nino Farina	12
1	4	(United States) Troy Ruttman	8
3	5	(France) Robert Manzon	7

- Note: Only the top five positions are included. Only the best 4 results counted towards the Championship.

Previous race: 1952 Belgian Grand Prix	FIA Formula One World Championship; 1952 season	Next race: 1952 British Grand Prix
Previous race: 1951 French Grand Prix	French Grand Prix	Next race: 1953 French Grand Prix
