= 1953 Buenos Aires Grand Prix =

Race details
- Date: February 1, 1953
- Official name: Gran Premio Ciudad de Buenos Aires
- Location: Argentina
- Course: Purpose built
- Course length: 4.708 km (2.924 miles)
- Distance: 40 laps, 188.32 km (117.01 miles)

Pole position
| Driver | (Italy) Alberto Ascari | Ferrari 375 |
- Time: 2m 20.2 (120.89 km/h)

Fastest lap
| Driver | (Italy) Luigi Villoresi | Ferrari 500 |
- Time: 2m 22.5 (118.94 km/h)

Podium
| First | (Italy) Nino Farina | Ferrari |
| Second | (Italy) Luigi Villoresi | Ferrari |
| Third | (United Kingdom) Mike Hawthorn | Ferrari |

Results from the 1953 Formula Libre Buenos Aires Grand Prix, held on February 1, 1953, at the Autódromo Juan y Óscar Gálvez in Buenos Aires.

== Classification ==
| Pos | Driver | Constructor | Laps | Time/Retired |
|---|---|---|---|---|
| 1 | (Italy) Nino Farina | Ferrari 500 | 40 | 1:36'52.9" |
| 2 | (Italy) Luigi Villoresi | Ferrari 500 | 40 | 1:36'53.0" |
| 3 | (United Kingdom) Mike Hawthorn | Ferrari 500 | 40 | 1:38'18.0" |
| 4 | (Argentina) José Froilán González | Maserati A6GCM | 40 | 1:38'45.6" |
| 5 | (France) Robert Manzon | Gordini T16 | 39 | 1:37'28.2" |
| 6 | (Argentina) Óscar Alfredo Gálvez | Maserati A6GCM | 39 | 1:37'46.2" |
| 7 | (Italy) Felice Bonetto | Maserati A6GCM | 39 | 1:38'13.0" |
| 8 | (France) Maurice Trintignant | Gordini T16 | 38 | 1:37'25.8" |
| 9 | (Argentina) Juan Manuel Fangio | Maserati A6GCM | 38 | 1:38'22.0" |
| 10 | (Argentina) Onofre Marimón | Ferrari 166 FL | 35 | 1:28'14.3" |
| 11 | (Argentina) Alberto Crespo | Alfa Romeo 8C-2900A | 35 | 1:37'12.4" |
| 12 | (United Kingdom) John David Barber | Cooper T23 Bristol | 35 | 1:37'54.0" |
| 13 | (Argentina) Clemar Bucci | Alfa Romeo 12C-37 | 34 | 1:23'04.0" |
| 14 | (Argentina) Roberto Miéres | Alfa Romeo 308 | 33 | 1:23'51.2" |
| Ret | (Argentina) José Félix Lopes | Ferrari 166 FL | | DNF |
| Ret | (France) Jean Behra | Gordini T16 | | DNF |
| Ret | (Argentina) Carlos Menditeguy | Gordini T16 | | DNF |
| Ret | (Argentina) Carlos Fortunatti Firpo | Maserati 4CLT | | DNF |
| Ret | (United Kingdom) Alan Brown | Cooper T20 Bristol | | DNF |
| Ret | (Argentina) Remo Gamalero | Maserati 4CLT | | DNF |
| Ret | (Argentina) Pablo Birger | Simca-Gordini T15 | | DNF |
| Ret | (Argentina) Adolfo Schwelm Cruz | Cooper T20 Bristol | | DNF |
| Ret | (Argentina) José Ciscar | Talbot T26C | | DNF |
| Ret | (Italy) Alberto Ascari | Ferrari 375 | | DNF |
