= 1953 Formula One season =

7th season of FIA's Formula One motor racing

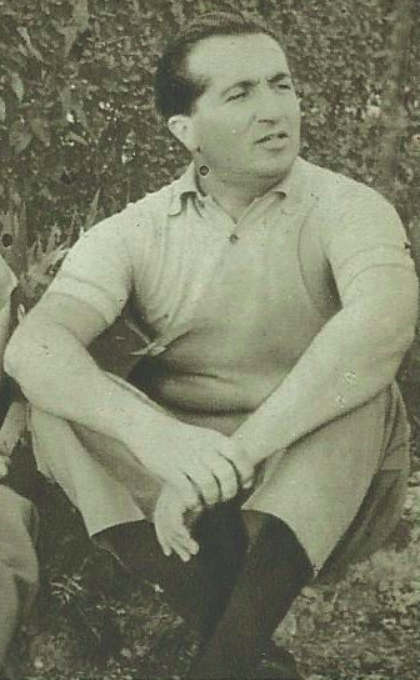
Alberto Ascari won his second and final Drivers' Championship with Ferrari. The first driver in Formula 1 history to win more than one championship.

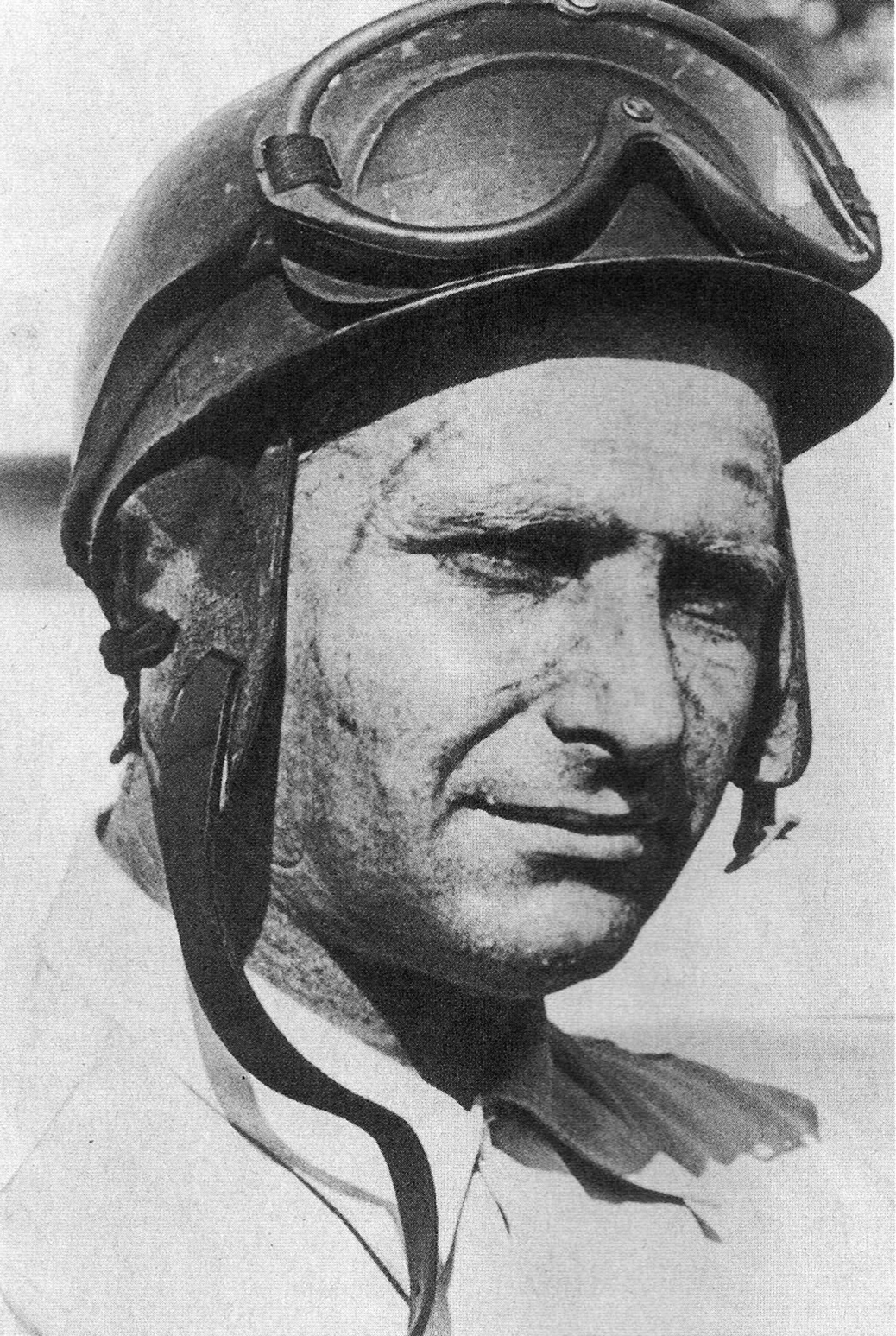
Maserati's Juan Manuel Fangio the then 1951 champion finished second in the World Championship of Drivers.

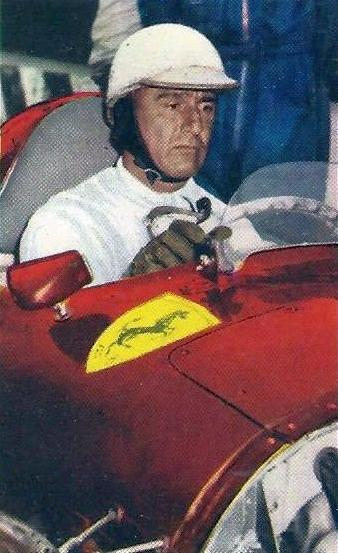
Ascari's teammate and 1950 champion Giuseppe Farina finished third.

The 1953 Formula One season was the seventh season of FIA Formula One motor racing. Just as in 1952, races counting towards the 4th World Championship of Drivers—which was contested over nine races between 18 January and 13 September 1953—were open only to Formula Two cars. The Indianapolis 500 continued to be run under the formula dictated by the Contest Board of the American Automobile Association. The season also included several non-championship races for F1 and F2 cars.

The World Drivers' Championship was won by Alberto Ascari driving for Scuderia Ferrari. Ascari became the first driver since the inception of the championship in 1950 to successfully defend his title. It would be his last title, as well as the last for any Italian driver, until 2026 with Kimi Antonelli.

For the first time, a championship event was included outside of Europe (with the exception of the Indianapolis 500): the 1953 Argentine Grand Prix. It was marred by an accident involving 1950 champion Nino Farina, who crashed into an unprotected crowd, killing nine spectators.

== Teams and drivers ==
The following teams and drivers competed in the 1953 FIA World Championship of Drivers. The list does not include those who only contested the Indianapolis 500.

| Entrant | Constructor | Chassis | Engine | Tyre | Driver | Rounds |
|---|---|---|---|---|---|---|
| (Italy) Officine Alfieri Maserati | Maserati | A6GCM | Maserati A6 2.0 L6 | P | (Argentina) Juan Manuel Fangio | 1, 3–9 |
| (Italy) Officine Alfieri Maserati | Maserati | A6GCM | Maserati A6 2.0 L6 | P | (Argentina) José Froilán González | 1, 3–6 |
| (Italy) Officine Alfieri Maserati | Maserati | A6GCM | Maserati A6 2.0 L6 | P | (Italy) Felice Bonetto | 1, 3, 5–9 |
| (Italy) Officine Alfieri Maserati | Maserati | A6GCM | Maserati A6 2.0 L6 | P | (Argentina) Oscar Gálvez | 1 |
| (Italy) Officine Alfieri Maserati | Maserati | A6GCM | Maserati A6 2.0 L6 | P | (Belgium) Johnny Claes | 4 |
| (Italy) Officine Alfieri Maserati | Maserati | A6GCM | Maserati A6 2.0 L6 | P | (Argentina) Onofre Marimón | 4–9 |
| (Italy) Officine Alfieri Maserati | Maserati | A6GCM | Maserati A6 2.0 L6 | P | (West Germany) Hermann Lang | 8 |
| (Italy) Officine Alfieri Maserati | Maserati | A6GCM | Maserati A6 2.0 L6 | P | (Italy) Sergio Mantovani | 9 |
| (Italy) Officine Alfieri Maserati | Maserati | A6GCM | Maserati A6 2.0 L6 | P | (Italy) Luigi Musso | 9 |
| (Italy) Scuderia Ferrari | Ferrari | 500; 553 | Ferrari 500 2.0 L4; Ferrari 553 2.0 L4 | P | (Italy) Alberto Ascari | 1, 3–9 |
| (Italy) Scuderia Ferrari | Ferrari | 500; 553 | Ferrari 500 2.0 L4; Ferrari 553 2.0 L4 | P | (Italy) Nino Farina | 1, 3–9 |
| (Italy) Scuderia Ferrari | Ferrari | 500; 553 | Ferrari 500 2.0 L4; Ferrari 553 2.0 L4 | P | (Italy) Luigi Villoresi | 1, 3–9 |
| (Italy) Scuderia Ferrari | Ferrari | 500; 553 | Ferrari 500 2.0 L4; Ferrari 553 2.0 L4 | P | (United Kingdom) Mike Hawthorn | 1, 3–9 |
| (Italy) Scuderia Ferrari | Ferrari | 500; 553 | Ferrari 500 2.0 L4; Ferrari 553 2.0 L4 | P | (Italy) Umberto Maglioli | 9 |
| (Italy) Scuderia Ferrari | Ferrari | 500; 553 | Ferrari 500 2.0 L4; Ferrari 553 2.0 L4 | P | (Italy) Piero Carini | 9 |
| (United Kingdom) Cooper Car Company | Cooper-Bristol Cooper-Alta | T20; T23; Special; T24 | Bristol BS1 2.0 L6; Alta F2 2.0 L4 | D | (United Kingdom) Alan Brown | 1 |
| (United Kingdom) Cooper Car Company | Cooper-Bristol Cooper-Alta | T20; T23; Special; T24 | Bristol BS1 2.0 L6; Alta F2 2.0 L4 | D | (United Kingdom) John Barber | 1 |
| (United Kingdom) Cooper Car Company | Cooper-Bristol Cooper-Alta | T20; T23; Special; T24 | Bristol BS1 2.0 L6; Alta F2 2.0 L4 | D | (Argentina) Adolfo Schwelm Cruz | 1 |
| (United Kingdom) Cooper Car Company | Cooper-Bristol Cooper-Alta | T20; T23; Special; T24 | Bristol BS1 2.0 L6; Alta F2 2.0 L4 | D | (United Kingdom) Stirling Moss | 5, 7, 9 |
| (France) Equipe Gordini | Gordini Simca-Gordini | Type 16; Type 15 | Gordini 20 2.0 L6; Gordini 1500 1.5 L4 | E | (France) Robert Manzon | 1 |
| (France) Equipe Gordini | Gordini Simca-Gordini | Type 16; Type 15 | Gordini 20 2.0 L6; Gordini 1500 1.5 L4 | E | (United States) Harry Schell | 1, 3–7, 9 |
| (France) Equipe Gordini | Gordini Simca-Gordini | Type 16; Type 15 | Gordini 20 2.0 L6; Gordini 1500 1.5 L4 | E | (France) Maurice Trintignant | 1, 3–9 |
| (France) Equipe Gordini | Gordini Simca-Gordini | Type 16; Type 15 | Gordini 20 2.0 L6; Gordini 1500 1.5 L4 | E | (France) Jean Behra | 1, 4–8 |
| (France) Equipe Gordini | Gordini Simca-Gordini | Type 16; Type 15 | Gordini 20 2.0 L6; Gordini 1500 1.5 L4 | E | (Argentina) Carlos Menditéguy | 1 |
| (France) Equipe Gordini | Gordini Simca-Gordini | Type 16; Type 15 | Gordini 20 2.0 L6; Gordini 1500 1.5 L4 | E | (Argentina) Pablo Birger | 1 |
| (France) Equipe Gordini | Gordini Simca-Gordini | Type 16; Type 15 | Gordini 20 2.0 L6; Gordini 1500 1.5 L4 | E | (Argentina) Roberto Mieres | 3, 5, 9 |
| (France) Equipe Gordini | Gordini Simca-Gordini | Type 16; Type 15 | Gordini 20 2.0 L6; Gordini 1500 1.5 L4 | E | (United States) Fred Wacker | 3–4, 8 |
| (France) Ecurie Rosier | Ferrari | 500 | Ferrari 500 2.0 L4 | D | (France) Louis Rosier | 3–7, 9 |
| (France) Ecurie Rosier | Ferrari | 500 | Ferrari 500 2.0 L4 | E | (France) Louis Rosier | 8 |
| (Switzerland) Enrico Platé | Maserati | A6GCM | Maserati A6 2.0 L6 | P | (Switzerland) Toulo de Graffenried | 3 |
| (United Kingdom) Connaught Engineering | Connaught-Lea-Francis | Type A | Lea-Francis 2.0 L4 | D | (United Kingdom) Roy Salvadori | 3, 5–7, 9 |
| (United Kingdom) Connaught Engineering | Connaught-Lea-Francis | Type A | Lea-Francis 2.0 L4 | D | (United Kingdom) Kenneth McAlpine | 3, 6–7, 9 |
| (United Kingdom) Connaught Engineering | Connaught-Lea-Francis | Type A | Lea-Francis 2.0 L4 | D | (United Kingdom) Stirling Moss | 3 |
| (United Kingdom) Connaught Engineering | Connaught-Lea-Francis | Type A | Lea-Francis 2.0 L4 | D | (Thailand) Birabongse Bhanudej | 5–7 |
| (United Kingdom) Connaught Engineering | Connaught-Lea-Francis | Type A | Lea-Francis 2.0 L4 | D | (United Kingdom) Jack Fairman | 9 |
| (Belgium) Ecurie Belge | Connaught-Lea-Francis | Type A | Lea-Francis 2.0 L4 | E | (Belgium) Johnny Claes | 3, 5, 7, 9 |
| (Belgium) Ecurie Belge | Connaught-Lea-Francis | Type A | Lea-Francis 2.0 L4 | E | (Belgium) André Pilette | 4 |
| (United Kingdom) Ken Wharton | Cooper-Bristol | T23 | Bristol BS1 2.0 L6 | D | (United Kingdom) Ken Wharton | 3, 5–6, 8–9 |
| (United Kingdom) HW Motors | HWM-Alta | 53 | Alta F2 2.0 L4 | D | (United Kingdom) Peter Collins | 3–6 |
| (United Kingdom) HW Motors | HWM-Alta | 53 | Alta F2 2.0 L4 | D | (United Kingdom) Lance Macklin | 3–6, 8–9 |
| (United Kingdom) HW Motors | HWM-Alta | 53 | Alta F2 2.0 L4 | D | (Belgium) Paul Frère | 4, 8 |
| (United Kingdom) HW Motors | HWM-Alta | 53 | Alta F2 2.0 L4 | D | (France) Yves Giraud-Cabantous | 5, 9 |
| (United Kingdom) HW Motors | HWM-Alta | 53 | Alta F2 2.0 L4 | D | (United Kingdom) Duncan Hamilton | 6 |
| (United Kingdom) HW Motors | HWM-Alta | 53 | Alta F2 2.0 L4 | D | (United Kingdom) Jack Fairman | 6 |
| (United Kingdom) HW Motors | HWM-Alta | 53 | Alta F2 2.0 L4 | D | (Switzerland) Albert Scherrer | 8 |
| (United Kingdom) HW Motors | HWM-Alta | 53 | Alta F2 2.0 L4 | D | (United States) John Fitch | 9 |
| (Switzerland) Emmanuel de Graffenried | Maserati | A6GCM | Maserati A6 2.0 L6 | P | (Switzerland) Toulo de Graffenried | 4–9 |
| (Belgium) Georges Berger | Simca-Gordini | Type 15 | Gordini 1500 1.5 L4 | E | (Belgium) Georges Berger | 4 |
| (Belgium) Arthur Legat | Veritas | Meteor | Veritas 2.0 L6 | E | (Belgium) Arthur Legat | 4 |
| (Belgium) Ecurie Francorchamps | Ferrari | 500 | Ferrari 500 2.0 L4 | E | (Belgium) Jacques Swaters | 4, 7–8 |
| (Belgium) Ecurie Francorchamps | Ferrari | 500 | Ferrari 500 2.0 L4 | E | (Belgium) Charles de Tornaco | 4 |
| (Monaco) Louis Chiron | OSCA | 20 | OSCA 2000 2.0 L6 | P | (Monaco) Louis Chiron | 5–6, 8–9 |
| (France) Élie Bayol | OSCA | 20 | OSCA 2000 2.0 L6 | P | (France) Élie Bayol | 5, 8 |
| (United Kingdom) Bob Gerard | Cooper-Bristol | T23 | Bristol BS1 2.0 L6 | D | (United Kingdom) Bob Gerard | 5–6 |
| (United Kingdom) R.R.C. Walker Racing Team | Connaught-Lea-Francis | Type A | Lea-Francis 2.0 L4 | D | (United Kingdom) Tony Rolt | 6 |
| (United Kingdom) Ecurie Ecosse | Connaught-Lea-Francis Cooper-Bristol | Type A T20 | Lea-Francis 2.0 L4; Bristol BS1 2.0 L6 | D | (United Kingdom) Ian Stewart | 6 |
| (United Kingdom) Ecurie Ecosse | Connaught-Lea-Francis Cooper-Bristol | Type A T20 | Lea-Francis 2.0 L4; Bristol BS1 2.0 L6 | D | (United Kingdom) Jimmy Stewart | 6 |
| (United Kingdom) R.J. Chase | Cooper-Bristol | T23 | Bristol BS1 2.0 L6 | D | (United Kingdom) Alan Brown | 6 |
| (United Kingdom) Atlantic Stable | Cooper-Alta | T24 | Alta F2 2.0 L4 | D | (United Kingdom) Peter Whitehead | 6 |
| (United Kingdom) Tony Crook | Cooper-Bristol | T20 | Bristol BS1 2.0 L6 | D | (United Kingdom) Tony Crook | 6 |
| (West Germany) Hans Stuck | AFM-Bristol | 6 | Bristol BS1 2.0 L6 | D | (West Germany) Hans Stuck | 7, 9 |
| (West Germany) Wolfgang Seidel | Veritas | RS | Veritas 2.0 L6 | D | (West Germany) Wolfgang Seidel | 7 |
| (West Germany) Willi Heeks | Veritas | Meteor | Veritas 2.0 L6 | D | (West Germany) Willi Heeks | 7 |
| (West Germany) Theo Helfrich | Veritas | RS | Veritas 2.0 L6 | D | (West Germany) Theo Helfrich | 7 |
| (West Germany) Oswald Karch | Veritas | RS | Veritas 2.0 L6 | D | (West Germany) Oswald Karch | 7 |
| (West Germany) Helmut Niedermayr | AFM-BMW | U8 | BMW 328 2.0 L6 | D | (East Germany) Theo Fitzau | 7 |
| (West Germany) Ernst Loof | Veritas | Meteor | Veritas 2.0 L6 | D | (West Germany) Ernst Loof | 7 |
| (West Germany) Hans Herrmann | Veritas | Meteor | Veritas 2.0 L6 | D | (West Germany) Hans Herrmann | 7 |
| (West Germany) Erwin Bauer | Veritas | RS | Veritas 2.0 L6 | D | (West Germany) Erwin Bauer | 7 |
| (Switzerland) Ecurie Espadon | Ferrari | 500; 212 | Ferrari 500 2.0 L4; Ferrari 166 2.0 V12 | P | (West Germany) Kurt Adolff | 7 |
| (Switzerland) Ecurie Espadon | Ferrari | 500; 212 | Ferrari 500 2.0 L4; Ferrari 166 2.0 V12 | P | (Switzerland) Peter Hirt | 8 |
| (Switzerland) Ecurie Espadon | Ferrari | 500; 212 | Ferrari 500 2.0 L4; Ferrari 166 2.0 V12 | P | (Switzerland) Max de Terra | 8 |
| (East Germany) Rennkollektiv EMW | EMW | R2 | EMW 6 2.0 L6 | D | (East Germany) Edgar Barth | 7 |
| (East Germany) Dora Greifzu | Greifzu-BMW | Eigenbau | BMW 328 2.0 L6 | D | (East Germany) Rudolf Krause | 7 |
| (East Germany) Ernst Klodwig | Heck-BMW | Eigenbau | BMW 328 2.0 L6 | D | (East Germany) Ernst Klodwig | 7 |
| (United Kingdom) Equipe Anglaise | Cooper-Bristol | T23 | Bristol BS1 2.0 L6 | D | (United Kingdom) Alan Brown | 7, 9 |
| (United Kingdom) Equipe Anglaise | Cooper-Bristol | T23 | Bristol BS1 2.0 L6 | D | (West Germany) Helmut Glöckler | 7 |
| (United Kingdom) Rodney Nuckey | Cooper-Bristol | T23 | Bristol BS1 2.0 L6 | D | (United Kingdom) Rodney Nuckey | 7 |
| (West Germany) Günther Bechem | AFM-BMW | 50–5 | BMW 328 2.0 L6 | D | (West Germany) Günther Bechem | 7 |
| (Brazil) Escuderia Bandeirantes | Maserati | A6GCM | Maserati A6 2.0 L6 | P | (Brazil) Chico Landi | 8 |
| (Italy) OSCA Automobili | OSCA | 20 | OSCA 2000 2.0 L6 | P | (France) Élie Bayol | 9 |
| (Italy) Scuderia Milano | Maserati | A6GCM | Maserati A6 2.0 L6 | P | (Brazil) Chico Landi | 9 |
| (Italy) Scuderia Milano | Maserati | A6GCM | Maserati A6 2.0 L6 | P | (Thailand) Birabongse Bhanudej | 9 |

=== Team and driver changes ===
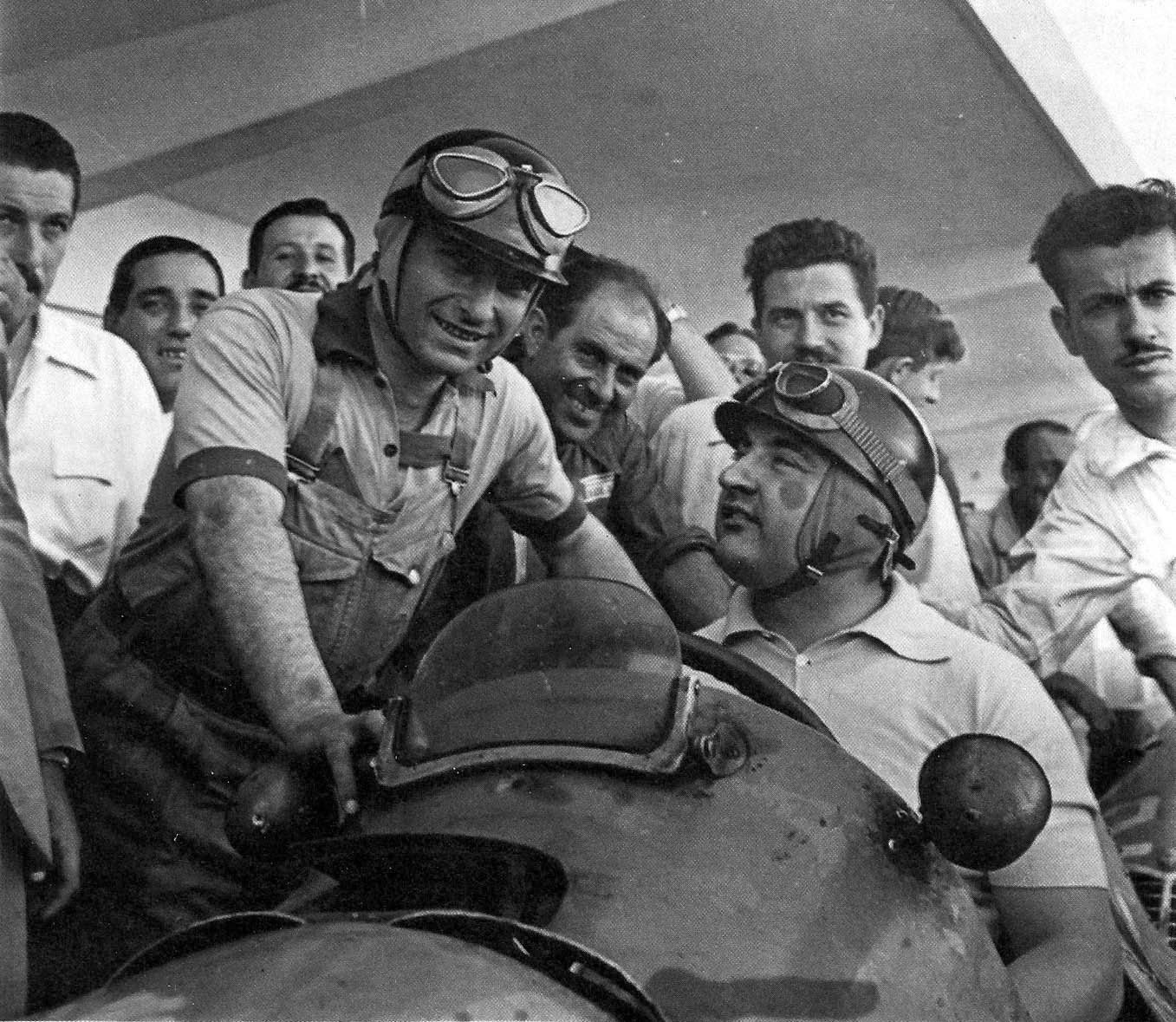
Juan Manuel Fangio (leaning on car) was hired by Maserati. Teammate José Froilán González is seen sitting in the car.

- After competing in just one race in 1952, Maserati entered at least three cars in each race this year. They convinced 1951 champion Juan Manuel Fangio to return to the sport and to replace Franco Rol.
- Mike Hawthorn was offered a drive with Ferrari after displaying his talent in several non-championship races in 1952. He replaced Piero Taruffi, who took up a drive with the Lancia sports car racing team.
- After separating with their driver Prince Bira during the 1952 season, Gordini attracted American driver Harry Schell for this year.
- Connaught had made their debut halfway through last season. They expanded their operations and hired Roy Salvadori and Kenneth McAlpine to drive.
- Cooper entered with a works team for the first time, but initially only competed in the season opener.

==== Mid-season changes ====
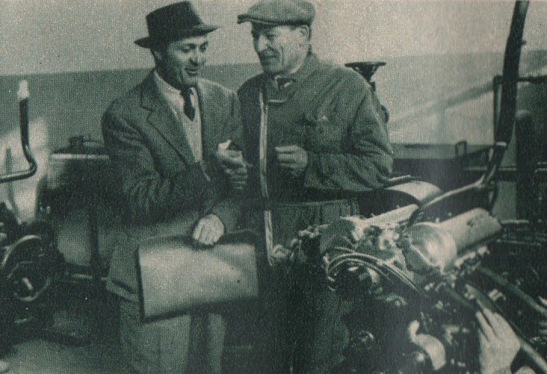
Louis Chiron (left) returned to F1 driving for OSCA.

- Robert Manzon left Gordini after just one race. He would return in 1954 with Louis Rosier's private team. Roberto Mieres made his debut as Manzon's replacement.
- From the Belgian Grand Prix on, Onofre Marimón joined Maserati as a full-time driver. José Froilán González left the team after the British Grand Prix. He would return to the grid with Ferrari in 1954.
- Veteran racer Louis Chiron returned to F1 at the 1953 French Grand Prix with OSCA.
- After competing in the season opener, Cooper returned to the grid for the French Grand Prix, with Stirling Moss as their sole driver, after he left a part-time drive at Connaught.
- When Moss left, Prince Bira joined the Connaught team for three races.
- Peter Collins left HWM before the end of the season. He would return in 1954 with Vanwall.
- José Froilán González crashed a Lancia sports car before the German Grand Prix, got injured and was out of F1 for the rest of the season. Hermann Lang returned to Grand Prix racing after 14 years to replace him for one race, before Sergio Mantovani and Luigi Musso joined the team to make their F1 debut.

== Calendar ==
| Round | Grand Prix | Circuit | Date |
|---|---|---|---|
| 1 | Argentine Grand Prix | (Argentina) Autódromo Oscar Alfredo Gálvez, Buenos Aires | 18 January |
| 2 | Indianapolis 500 | (United States) Indianapolis Motor Speedway, Speedway | 30 May (Note: The Indianapolis 500 also counted towards the 1953 AAA Championship Car season, and was run for AAA Championship cars, but was not run to Formula One regulations.) |
| 3 | Dutch Grand Prix | (Netherlands) Circuit Zandvoort, Zandvoort | 7 June |
| 4 | Belgian Grand Prix | (Belgium) Circuit de Spa-Francorchamps, Stavelot | 21 June |
| 5 | French Grand Prix | (France) Reims-Gueux, Gueux | 5 July |
| 6 | British Grand Prix | (United Kingdom) Silverstone Circuit, Silverstone | 18 July |
| 7 | German Grand Prix | (West Germany) Nürburgring, Nürburg | 2 August |
| 8 | Swiss Grand Prix | (Switzerland) Circuit Bremgarten, Bern | 23 August |
| 9 | Italian Grand Prix | (Italy) Autodromo Nazionale di Monza, Monza | 13 September |

=== Calendar changes ===
- On 18 January, the Argentine Grand Prix hosted its first World Championship Grand Prix.
- The Swiss Grand Prix was moved back from mid May to late August, while the Dutch Grand Prix was moved up from mid August to early June.
- After a year at Rouen-Les-Essarts, the French Grand Prix was moved back to Reims-Gueux.
- The Spanish Grand Prix was scheduled to be held on 26 October, but it was cancelled for monetary reasons.

== Championship report ==
=== Rounds 1 to 3 ===
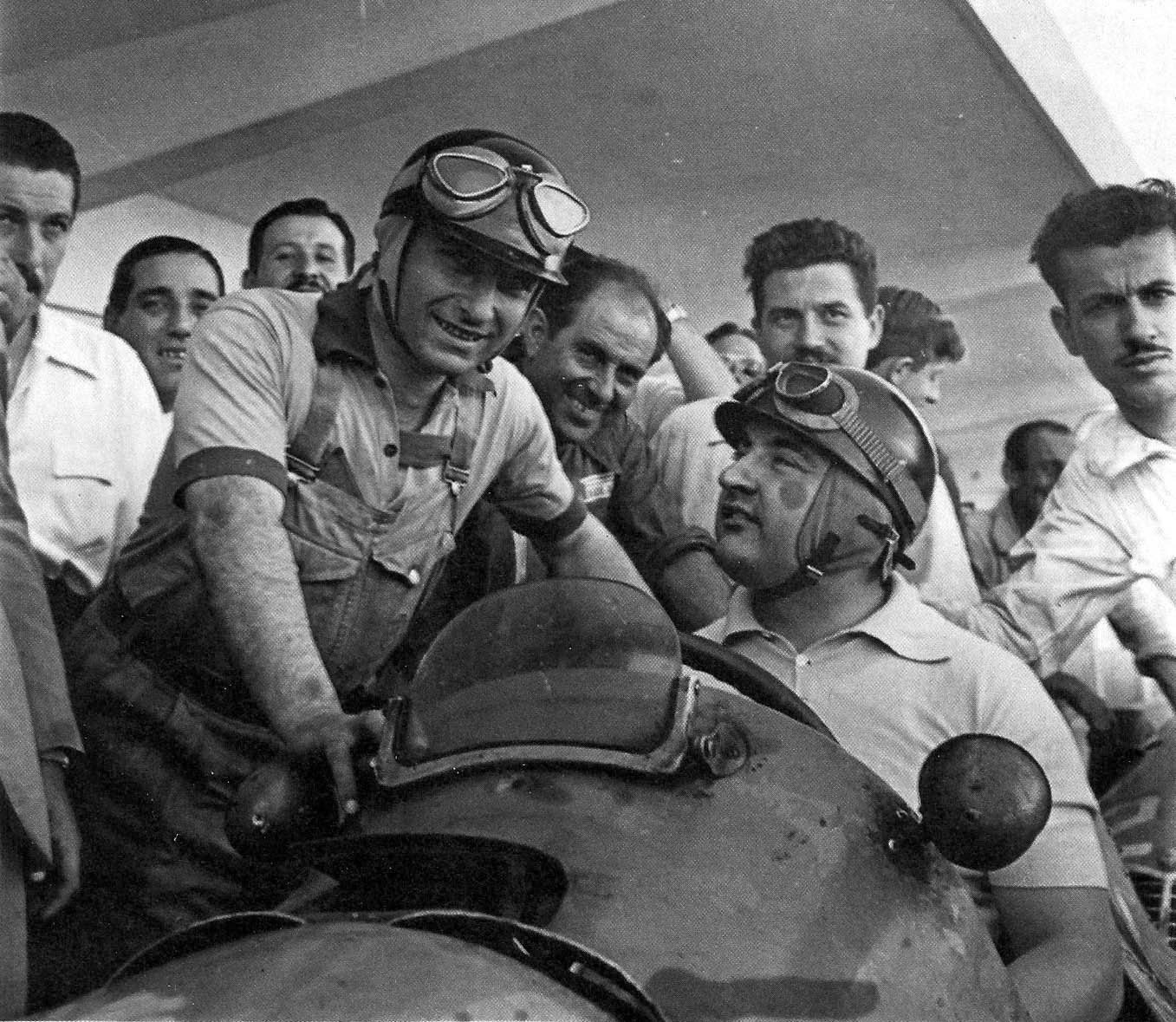
Maserati drivers Juan Manuel Fangio (left) and José Froilán González (right) during a test before the 1953 Argentine Grand Prix

The 1953 season started in Argentina, the first championship Formula One Grand Prix outside of Europe (with the exception of the Indianapolis 500). Alberto Ascari and Ferrari had dominated 1952, but Juan Manuel Fangio, the 1951 champion returning after a year away, at the new Maserati works team were expected to put up a good fight. Ascari qualified on pole position, ahead of Fangio and Ferrari teammates Luigi Villoresi and Nino Farina. The race attracted so many spectators that they were able to break through the security parameter and sit by the track. Only the fear of a riot resisted the organisers from cancelling the race. Ascari held the lead at the start, ahead of Fangio, as the lines of people grew thicker. On lap 21, Adolfo Schwelm Cruz's Cooper lost a wheel, which bounced into the crowd, and eleven laps later, Farina spun off, crushing bodies until his Ferrari came to a halt. At least nine people were killed, which became ten when, amidst the panic, a little boy ran onto the track and was hit by the Cooper of Alan Brown. The race continued, Fangio retired with a broken transmission and Ascari finished a lap ahead of Villoresi and Maserati's José Froilán González.

The Indianapolis 500 was included in the Formula One championship, but no F1 drivers attended. Bill Vukovich won the race for the second year in a row.

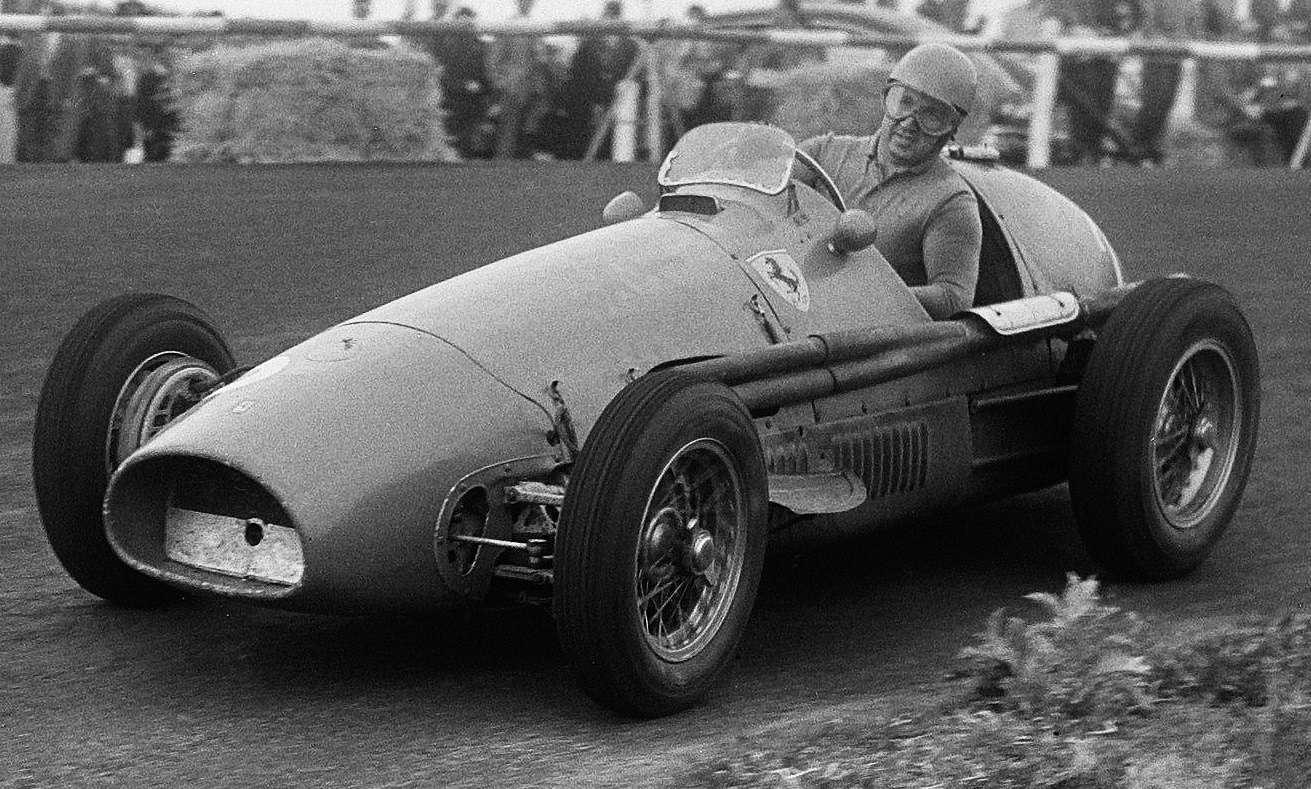
Alberto Ascari (Ferrari) won the Dutch Grand Prix.

The Dutch Grand Prix, being the first round of the year in Europe, attracted no less than twenty entrants, and Maserati brought upgraded cars. Still, the starting grid looked almost the same as in Argentina: Ascari, with Fangio and Farina next to him, and Villoresi and González on the second row. At the start, Ascari took the lead, while his teammates converged on Fangio, squeezing him almost to a standstill. The three prancing horses led away unchallenged. Both González and Fangio retired with a broken rear axle. Villoresi retired when his injection failed. Ascari and Farina finished 1–2, while González managed to get third after taking over the car from a teammate.

In the Drivers' Championship, Alberto Ascari (Ferrari) was leading with 17 points. Bill Vukovich was second with 9, but he would not enter any other races. Luigi Villoresi (Ferrari) was third with 7 points.

=== Rounds 4 to 6 ===
The Maseratis were favourites going into the Belgian Grand Prix because of their high top speed. Juan Manuel Fangio delivered and set pole position, ahead of championship leader Alberto Ascari and teammate José Froilán González. Ascari's Ferrari teammates Nino Farina and Luigi Villoresi occupied the second row. González took the lead at the start and the two Maseratis streaked away, until they retired with mechanical issues two laps from each other. Farina retired as well, leaving Ascari and Villoresi to finish 1–2, ahead of Onofre Marimón on his debut for Maserati.

Ascari continued his dominance with a pole position for the French Grand Prix, ahead of Maserati's Felice Bonetto (teammate González set the qualifying time, but it was in Bonetto's car) and Villoresi. Fangio and González stood on the second row, but the latter took the lead at the start. Farina had a good start, while Bonetto spun, so González was now under threat from a group of four Ferraris. But the Argentinian streaked away and it was Fangio who started pressuring the group from behind. At half-distance, González pitted to refuel, which explained his good pace. A tight group was formed of seven red cars, all fighting for the lead. The Ferraris were better through the corners, but the Maseratis had a higher top speed, and with two laps to go, Mike Hawthorn and Fangio were side-by-side over the line. Hawthorn managed to inch in front and won, ahead of Fangio and González.

At the British Grand Prix, the front row was divided between the two Italian teams: Ascari scored pole, ahead of González, Hawthorn and Fangio. Fangio tried to take the lead at the start, but drifted wide and Ascari went back through. Hawthorn spun off and returned to the pits for a check-up. González was in second place, before officials suspected his Maserati from losing oil and ordered him to pit. Ascari increased his lead over now-second Fangio, before rain and hail fell and the circuit flooded. A couple of drivers spun, but Ascari finished his faultless race to win, a minute ahead of Fangio and two laps ahead of Farina. Ascari and González set the same fastest lap (measured in whole seconds), so they both gained an extra half a point.

In the Drivers' Championship, Alberto Ascari (Ferrari) was leading with 33.5 points, ahead of Mike Hawthorn (Ferrari) with 16 and José Froilán González (Maserati) with 13.5.

=== Rounds 7 to 9 ===
Championship leader Alberto Ascari qualified on pole position for the German Grand Prix, ahead of Juan Manuel Fangio, Nino Farina and Mike Hawthorn. Fangio took the lead at the start, but Ascari was back in front after half a lap. He looked set to score his fourth win of the year, until he suddenly appeared in the pits with just three wheels. Farina took the lead, while Ascari fell back to ninth place. On lap 10, he took over the car from teammate Luigi Villoresi, suddenly bringing the championship leader back to fourth place. He set the fastest lap since Hermann Lang in 1939 but then retired with a blown engine. Farina held on to the lead and won the race, ahead of Fangio and Hawthorn.

At this point, the Spanish Grand Prix was still scheduled for 26 October, so there were three races left to go. Farina, Fangio and Hawthorn could theoretically prevent Ascari from becoming champion, but they had to win all remaining races, while setting the fastest lap in at least two of them. At the Swiss Grand Prix, Fangio scored pole position, ahead of Ascari and Farina, while Hawthorn started seventh. Ascari passed Fangio on the opening lap, while Farina fell back. On lap 10, Fangio switched cars with teammate Felice Bonetto, since the Italian's seemed to be running better, but then Fangio had to pit again with a flat tyre, and on lap 28, dramatically retired with a blown engine. This let the recovering Farina into second place, which became the lead when Ascari's carburetor failed and he spent 11 minutes in the pits. He rejoined in third, but such was his pace, that he passed both Hawthorn and Farina and then won over a minute ahead of Farina. Mike Hawthorn finished third to make it an all-Ferrari podium. Hermann Lang finished fifth in his first Grand Prix since 1939.

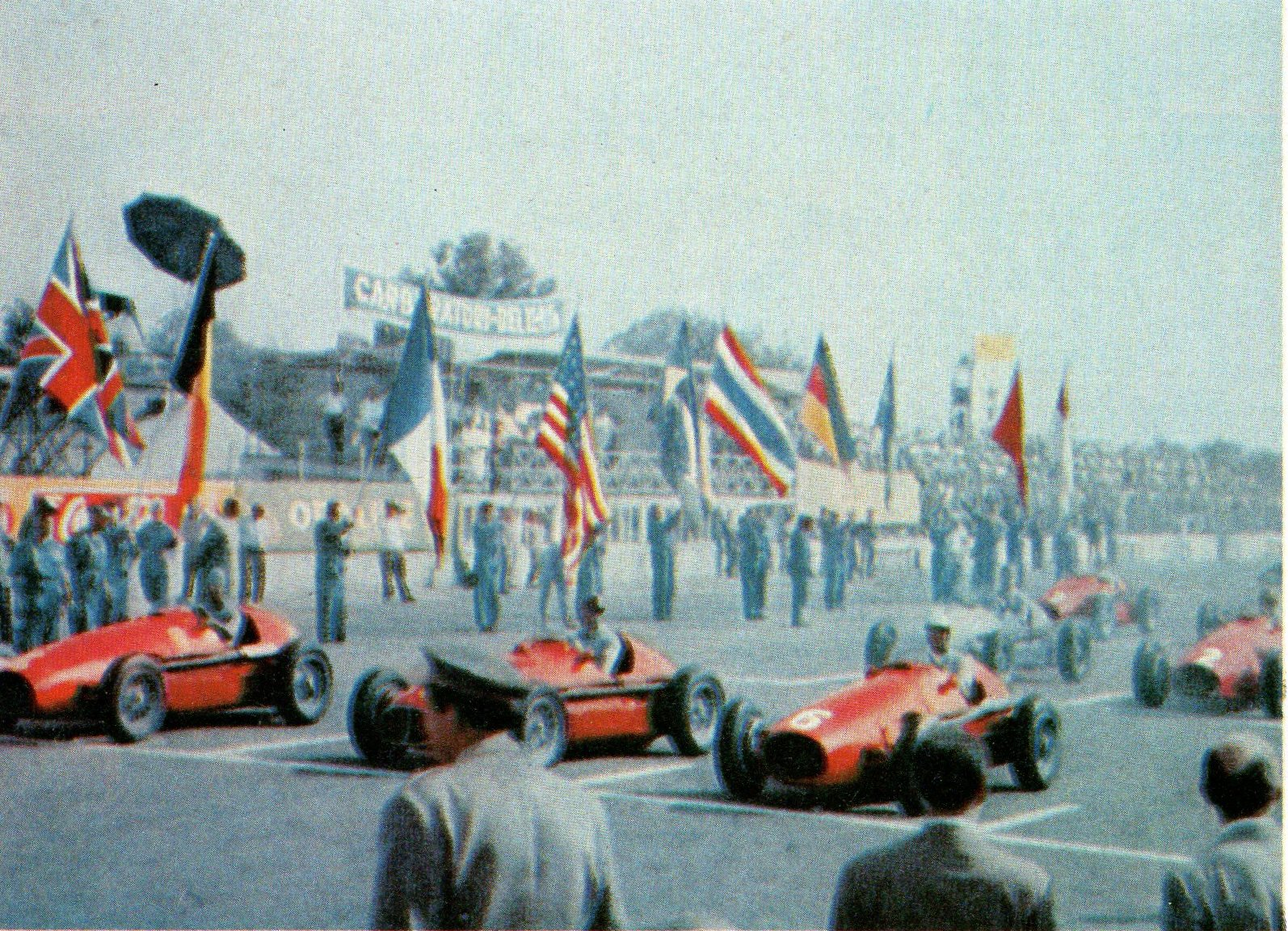
The starting grid for the Italian Grand Prix

With his win in Switzerland, Ascari had big enough of a lead to secure his second consecutive title. This became even clearer when the Spanish Grand Prix was cancelled and only one race was left in the season, the Italian Grand Prix. Ascari showed no signs of slowing down and reached a record total of six pole positions in a season. He started ahead of Fangio and Farina. Fourth-placed Onofre Marimón made a good start to pass both champions ahead of him, to slot in behind the now-double champion. Like in Reims, the four leaders formed a group that lapped the rest of the field and never separated more than a car length or two from each other. Just over half-distance, Marimón pitted with a damaged radiator, so it was now a three-horse race. On the very last corner, Ascari spun off into the grass, Farina went off the track to avoid him and, although the latter continued over the finish line, it let Fangio claim his first win since 1951. Farina was second and, although Ascari retired just 200 yards from the finish, he was classified behind all cars still running, so Villoresi took third.

In the Drivers' Championship, Alberto Ascari (Ferrari) scored 34.5 points to clinch his second consecutive title, ahead of Juan Manuel Fangio (Maserati) with 28 and Nino Farina (Ferrari) with 26.

== Results and standings ==
=== Grands Prix ===
| Round | Grand Prix | Pole position | Fastest lap | Winning driver | Winning constructor | Tyre | Report |
|---|---|---|---|---|---|---|---|
| 1 | (Argentina) Argentine Grand Prix | (Italy) Alberto Ascari | (Italy) Alberto Ascari | (Italy) Alberto Ascari | (Italy) Ferrari | P | Report |
| 2 | (United States) Indianapolis 500 | (United States) Bill Vukovich | (United States) Bill Vukovich | (United States) Bill Vukovich | (United States) Kurtis Kraft-Offenhauser | F | Report |
| 3 | (Netherlands) Dutch Grand Prix | (Italy) Alberto Ascari | (Italy) Luigi Villoresi | (Italy) Alberto Ascari | (Italy) Ferrari | P | Report |
| 4 | (Belgium) Belgian Grand Prix | (Argentina) Juan Manuel Fangio | (Argentina) José Froilán González | (Italy) Alberto Ascari | (Italy) Ferrari | P | Report |
| 5 | (France) French Grand Prix | (Italy) Alberto Ascari | (Argentina) Juan Manuel Fangio | (United Kingdom) Mike Hawthorn | (Italy) Ferrari | P | Report |
| 6 | (United Kingdom) British Grand Prix | (Italy) Alberto Ascari | (Italy) Alberto Ascari (Argentina) José Froilán González | (Italy) Alberto Ascari | (Italy) Ferrari | P | Report |
| 7 | (West Germany) German Grand Prix | (Italy) Alberto Ascari | (Italy) Alberto Ascari | (Italy) Giuseppe Farina | (Italy) Ferrari | P | Report |
| 8 | (Switzerland) Swiss Grand Prix | (Argentina) Juan Manuel Fangio | (Italy) Alberto Ascari | (Italy) Alberto Ascari | (Italy) Ferrari | P | Report |
| 9 | (Italy) Italian Grand Prix | (Italy) Alberto Ascari | (Argentina) Juan Manuel Fangio | (Argentina) Juan Manuel Fangio | (Italy) Maserati | P | Report |

=== Scoring system ===
Points were awarded to the top five classified finishers, with an additional point awarded for setting the fastest lap, regardless of finishing position or even classification. Only the best four results counted towards the championship. Shared drives result in half points for each driver if they finished in a points-scoring position. If more than one driver set the same fastest lap time, the fastest lap point would be divided equally between the drivers. Numbers without parentheses are championship points; numbers in parentheses are total points scored. Points were awarded in the following system:

| Position | 1st | 2nd | 3rd | 4th | 5th | FL |
|---|---|---|---|---|---|---|
| Race | 8 | 6 | 4 | 3 | 2 | 1 |

=== World Championship of Drivers standings ===
| Pos. | Driver | ARG (Argentina) | 500‡ (United States) | NED (Netherlands) | BEL (Belgium) | FRA (France) | GBR (United Kingdom) | GER (West Germany) | SUI (Switzerland) | ITA (Italy) | Pts. |
|---|---|---|---|---|---|---|---|---|---|---|---|
| 1 | (Italy) Alberto Ascari | 1^{P}^{F} | | 1^{P} | (1) | (4)^{P} | 1^{P}^{F}* | 8^{P}†/ (Ret^{F})† | 1^{F} | Ret^{P} | 34.5 (46.5) |
| 2 | (Argentina) Juan Manuel Fangio | Ret | | Ret | Ret^{P}/ Ret† | 2^{F} | 2 | 2 | (4^{P}†) / Ret† | 1^{F} | 28 (29.5) |
| 3 | (Italy) Nino Farina | Ret | | 2 | Ret | (5) | (3) | 1 | 2 | 2 | 26 (32) |
| 4 | (United Kingdom) Mike Hawthorn | 4 | | (4) | 6 | 1 | (5) | 3 | 3 | (4) | 19 (27) |
| 5 | (Italy) Luigi Villoresi | 2 | | Ret^{F} | 2 | 6 | Ret | 8† / Ret† | 6 | 3 | 17 |
| 6 | (Argentina) José Froilán González | 3 | | 3† / Ret | (Ret^{F}) | 3 | 4^{F}* | | | | 13.5 (14.5) |
| 7 | (United States) Bill Vukovich | | 1^{P}^{F} | | | | | | | | 9 |
| 8 | (Switzerland) Toulo de Graffenried | | | 5 | 4 | 7 | Ret | 5 | Ret | Ret | 7 |
| 9 | (Italy) Felice Bonetto | Ret | | 3† | | Ret | 6 | 4 | 4† / Ret† | Ret | 6.5 |
| 10 | (United States) Art Cross | | 2 | | | | | | | | 6 |
| 11 | (Argentina) Onofre Marimón | | | | 3 | 9 | Ret | Ret | Ret | Ret | 4 |
| 12 | (France) Maurice Trintignant | 7† | | 6 | 5 | Ret | Ret | Ret | Ret | 5 | 4 |
| 13 | (United States) Sam Hanks | | 3† | | | | | | | | 2 |
| 14 | (United States) Duane Carter | | 3† | | | | | | | | 2 |
| 15 | (Argentina) Óscar Alfredo Gálvez | 5 | | | | | | | | | 2 |
| 16 | (United States) Jack McGrath | | 5 | | | | | | | | 2 |
| 17 | (West Germany) Hermann Lang | | | | | | | | 5 | | 2 |
| 18 | (United States) Fred Agabashian | | 4† | | | | | | | | 1.5 |
| 19 | (United States) Paul Russo | | 4† | | | | | | | | 1.5 |
| — | (United Kingdom) Stirling Moss | | | 9 | | Ret | | 6 | | 13 | 0 |
| — | (France) Jean Behra | 6 | | | Ret | 10 | Ret | Ret | Ret | | 0 |
| — | (Argentina) Roberto Mieres | | | Ret | | Ret | | | | 6 | 0 |
| — | (United States) Jimmy Daywalt | | 6 | | | | | | | | 0 |
| — | (United States) Harry Schell | 7† | | Ret | 7 | Ret | Ret | Ret | | 9 | 0 |
| — | (France) Louis Rosier | | | 7 | 8 | 8 | 10 | 10 | Ret | 16 | 0 |
| — | (United Kingdom) Ken Wharton | | | Ret | | Ret | 8 | | 7 | NC | 0 |
| — | (Thailand) Birabongse Bhanudej | | | | | Ret | 7 | Ret | | 11 | 0 |
| — | (Belgium) Jacques Swaters | | | | DNS | | | 7 | Ret | | 0 |
| — | (United States) Jim Rathmann | | 7 | | | | | | | | 0 |
| — | (Italy) Sergio Mantovani | | | | | | | | | 7† | 0 |
| — | (Italy) Luigi Musso | | | | | | | | | 7† | 0 |
| — | (United Kingdom) Peter Collins | | | 8 | Ret | 13 | Ret | | | | 0 |
| — | (United Kingdom) John Barber | 8 | | | | | | | | | 0 |
| — | (United States) Ernie McCoy | | 8 | | | | | | | | 0 |
| — | (Switzerland) Max de Terra | | | | | | | | 8 | | 0 |
| — | (Italy) Umberto Maglioli | | | | | | | | | 8 | 0 |
| — | (United Kingdom) Alan Brown | 9 | | | | | Ret | Ret | | 12 | 0 |
| — | (United States) Fred Wacker | | | DNS | 9 | | | | DNS | | 0 |
| — | (United States) Tony Bettenhausen | | 9 | | | | | | | | 0 |
| — | (United Kingdom) Peter Whitehead | | | | | | 9 | | | | 0 |
| — | (West Germany) Hans Herrmann | | | | | | | 9 | | | 0 |
| — | (Switzerland) Albert Scherrer | | | | | | | | 9 | | 0 |
| — | (Monaco) Louis Chiron | | | | | 15 | DNS | | DNS | 10 | 0 |
| — | (Belgium) Paul Frère | | | | 10 | | | | Ret | | 0 |
| — | (United States) Jimmy Davies | | 10 | | | | | | | | 0 |
| — | (United States) Duke Nalon | | 11 | | | | | | | | 0 |
| — | (Belgium) André Pilette | | | | 11 | | | | | | 0 |
| — | (United Kingdom) Bob Gerard | | | | | 11 | Ret | | | | 0 |
| — | (United Kingdom) Rodney Nuckey | | | | | | | 11 | | | 0 |
| — | (Belgium) Johnny Claes | | | NC | Ret† | 12 | | Ret | | Ret | 0 |
| — | (United States) Carl Scarborough | | 12 | | | | | | | | 0 |
| — | (West Germany) Theo Helfrich | | | | | | | 12 | | | 0 |
| — | (United Kingdom) Kenneth McAlpine | | | Ret | | | Ret | 13 | | NC | 0 |
| — | (United States) Manny Ayulo | | 13 | | | | | | | | 0 |
| — | (France) Yves Giraud-Cabantous | | | | | 14 | | | | 15 | 0 |
| — | (West Germany) Hans Stuck | | | | | | | Ret | | 14 | 0 |
| — | (United States) Jimmy Bryan | | 14 | | | | | | | | 0 |
| — | (East Germany) Rudolf Krause | | | | | | | 14 | | | 0 |
| — | (United States) Bill Holland | | 15 | | | | | | | | 0 |
| — | (East Germany) Ernst Klodwig | | | | | | | 15 | | | 0 |
| — | (United States) Rodger Ward | | 16 | | | | | | | | 0 |
| — | (West Germany) Wolfgang Seidel | | | | | | | 16 | | | 0 |
| — | (United States) Walt Faulkner | | 17 | | | | | | | | 0 |
| — | (United Kingdom) Jack Fairman | | | | | | Ret | | | NC | 0 |
| — | (United Kingdom) Lance Macklin | | | Ret | Ret | Ret | Ret | | Ret | Ret | 0 |
| — | (United Kingdom) Roy Salvadori | | | Ret | | Ret | Ret | Ret | | Ret | 0 |
| — | (France) Élie Bayol | | | | | Ret | | | DNS | Ret | 0 |
| — | (Brazil) Chico Landi | | | | | | | | Ret | Ret | 0 |
| — | (France) Robert Manzon | Ret | | | | | | | | | 0 |
| — | (Argentina) Carlos Menditeguy | Ret | | | | | | | | | 0 |
| — | (Argentina) Pablo Birger | Ret | | | | | | | | | 0 |
| — | (Argentina) Adolfo Schwelm Cruz | Ret | | | | | | | | | 0 |
| — | (United States) Marshall Teague | | Ret | | | | | | | | 0 |
| — | (United States) Spider Webb | | Ret | | | | | | | | 0 |
| — | (United States) Bob Sweikert | | Ret | | | | | | | | 0 |
| — | (United States) Mike Nazaruk | | Ret | | | | | | | | 0 |
| — | (United States) Pat Flaherty | | Ret | | | | | | | | 0 |
| — | (United States) Jerry Hoyt | | Ret | | | | | | | | 0 |
| — | (United States) Johnnie Parsons | | Ret | | | | | | | | 0 |
| — | (United States) Don Freeland | | Ret | | | | | | | | 0 |
| — | (United States) Gene Hartley | | Ret | | | | | | | | 0 |
| — | (United States) Chuck Stevenson | | Ret | | | | | | | | 0 |
| — | (United States) Cal Niday | | Ret | | | | | | | | 0 |
| — | (United States) Bob Scott | | Ret | | | | | | | | 0 |
| — | (United States) Andy Linden | | Ret | | | | | | | | 0 |
| — | (United States) Johnny Thomson | | Ret | | | | | | | | 0 |
| — | (Belgium) Georges Berger | | | | Ret | | | | | | 0 |
| — | (Belgium) Arthur Legat | | | | Ret | | | | | | 0 |
| — | (United Kingdom) Jimmy Stewart | | | | | | Ret | | | | 0 |
| — | (United Kingdom) Tony Rolt | | | | | | Ret | | | | 0 |
| — | (United Kingdom) Ian Stewart | | | | | | Ret | | | | 0 |
| — | (United Kingdom) Duncan Hamilton | | | | | | Ret | | | | 0 |
| — | (United Kingdom) Tony Crook | | | | | | Ret | | | | 0 |
| — | (East Germany) Edgar Barth | | | | | | | Ret | | | 0 |
| — | (West Germany) Oswald Karch | | | | | | | Ret | | | 0 |
| — | (West Germany) Willi Heeks | | | | | | | Ret | | | 0 |
| — | (East Germany) Theo Fitzau | | | | | | | Ret | | | 0 |
| — | (West Germany) Kurt Adolff | | | | | | | Ret | | | 0 |
| — | (West Germany) Günther Bechem | | | | | | | Ret | | | 0 |
| — | (West Germany) Ernst Loof | | | | | | | Ret | | | 0 |
| — | (West Germany) Erwin Bauer | | | | | | | Ret | | | 0 |
| — | (Switzerland) Peter Hirt | | | | | | | | Ret | | 0 |
| — | (Italy) Piero Carini | | | | | | | | | Ret | 0 |
| — | (United States) John Fitch | | | | | | | | | Ret | 0 |
| — | (Belgium) Charles de Tornaco | | | | DNS | | | | | | 0 |
| — | (West Germany) Helmut Glöckler | | | | | | | DNS | | | 0 |
| Pos. | Driver | ARG (Argentina) | 500‡ (United States) | NED (Netherlands) | BEL (Belgium) | FRA (France) | GBR (United Kingdom) | GER (West Germany) | SUI (Switzerland) | ITA (Italy) | Pts. |

Key
| Colour | Result |
|---|---|
| Gold | Winner |
| Silver | Second place |
| Bronze | Third place |
| Green | Other points position |
| Blue | Other classified position |
| Blue | Not classified, finished (NC) |
| Purple | Not classified, retired (Ret) |
| Red | Did not qualify (DNQ) |
| Black | Disqualified (DSQ) |
| White | Did not start (DNS) |
| White | Race cancelled (C) |
| Blank | Did not practice (DNP) |
| Blank | Excluded (EX) |
| Blank | Did not arrive (DNA) |
| Blank | Withdrawn (WD) |
| Blank | Did not enter (empty cell) |
| Annotation | Meaning |
| P | Pole position |
| F | Fastest lap |

- † Position shared between more drivers of the same car
- * Point for fastest lap shared between different drivers.
- ‡ Several cars were shared in this race. See the race page for details.

== Non-championship races ==
The following Formula One/Formula Two/Formula Libre races, which did not count towards the World Championship of Drivers, were held in 1953.

| Race name | Circuit | Date | Formula | Winning driver | Constructor | Report |
|---|---|---|---|---|---|---|
| (Argentina) VII Gran Premio Ciudad de Buenos Aires | Autódromo Oscar y Juan Gálvez | 1 February | Formula Libre | (Italy) Giuseppe Farina | (Italy) Ferrari | Report |
| (Italy) III Gran Premio di Siracusa | Syracuse | 22 March | Formula Two | (Switzerland) Toulo de Graffenried | (Italy) Maserati | Report |
| (France) XIV Pau Grand Prix | Pau | 6 April | Formula Two | (Italy) Alberto Ascari | (Italy) Ferrari | Report |
| (United Kingdom) V Lavant Cup | Goodwood | 6 April | Formula Two | (Switzerland) Toulo de Graffenried | (Italy) Maserati | Report |
| (United Kingdom) II Aston Martin Owners Club Formula 2 Race | Snetterton | 18 April | Formula Two | (United Kingdom) Eric Thompson | (United Kingdom) Connaught-Lea Francis | Report |
| (France) II Grand Prix de Bordeaux | Bordeaux | 3 May | Formula Two | (Italy) Alberto Ascari | (Italy) Ferrari | Report |
| (United Kingdom) V BRDC International Trophy | Silverstone | 9 May | Formula Two | (United Kingdom) Mike Hawthorn | (Italy) Ferrari | Report |
| (Finland) XV Eläintarhanajot | Eläintarharata | 10 May | Formula One | (United Kingdom) Rodney Nuckey | (United Kingdom) Cooper-Bristol | Report |
| (Italy) VI Gran Premio di Napoli | Posillipo | 10 May | Formula Two | (Italy) Giuseppe Farina | (Italy) Ferrari | Report |
| (United Kingdom) VII Ulster Trophy | Dundrod | 16 May | Formula Two | (United Kingdom) Mike Hawthorn | (Italy) Ferrari | Report |
| (United Kingdom) I Winfield JC Formula 2 Race | Charterhall | 23 May | Formula Two | (United Kingdom) Ken Wharton | (United Kingdom) Cooper-Bristol | Report |
| (Belgium) XXIII Grand Prix des Frontières | Chimay | 24 May | Formula Two | (France) Maurice Trintignant | (France) Gordini | Report |
| (United Kingdom) III Coronation Trophy | Crystal Palace | 25 May | Formula Two | (United Kingdom) Tony Rolt | (United Kingdom) Connaught-Lea Francis | Report |
| (United Kingdom) I Snetterton Coronation Trophy | Snetterton | 30 May | Formula Two | (United Kingdom) Tony Rolt | (United Kingdom) Connaught-Lea Francis | Report |
| (West Germany) XVII Internationales ADAC Eifelrennen | Nürburgring | 31 May | Formula Two | (Switzerland) Toulo de Graffenried | (Italy) Maserati | Report |
| (France) XV Grand Prix de l'Albigeois | Albi (Les Planques) | 31 May | Formula Two | (France) Louis Rosier | (Italy) Ferrari | Report |
| (France) I Coupe de Printemps | Montlhéry | 31 May | Formula Two | (France) Marcel Balsa | (West Germany) BMW | Report |
| (United Kingdom) II West Essex CC Race | Snetterton | 27 June | Formula Two | (United Kingdom) Kenneth McAlpine | (United Kingdom) Connaught-Lea Francis | Report |
| (United Kingdom) I Midlands MECC Race | Silverstone | 27 June | Formula Two | (United Kingdom) Tony Crook | (United Kingdom) Cooper-Alta | Report |
| (France) III Grand Prix de Rouen-les-Essarts | Rouen-Les-Essarts | 28 June | Formula One | (Italy) Giuseppe Farina | (Italy) Ferrari | Report |
| (United Kingdom) I Crystal Palace Trophy | Crystal Palace | 11 July | Formula Two | (United Kingdom) Tony Rolt | (United Kingdom) Connaught-Lea Francis | Report |
| (West Germany) IX Internationales Avusrennen | AVUS | 12 July | Formula Two | (Belgium) Jacques Swaters | (Italy) Ferrari | Report |
| (United Kingdom) II United States Air Force Trophy | Snetterton | 25 July | Formula Two | (United Kingdom) Tony Rolt | (United Kingdom) Connaught-Lea Francis | Report |
| (France) V Circuit du Lac | Aix-les-Bains | 26 July | Formula Two | (France) Élie Bayol | (Italy) OSCA | Report |
| (United Kingdom) I Bristol MC & LCC Race | Thruxton | 3 August | Formula Two | (United Kingdom) Tony Rolt | (United Kingdom) Connaught-Lea Francis | Report |
| (United Kingdom) I Mid-Cheshire MC Race | Oulton Park | 8 August | Formula Two | (United Kingdom) Tony Rolt | (United Kingdom) Connaught-Lea Francis | Report |
| (France) III Grand Prix de Sables d'Olonne | Les Sables-d'Olonne | 9 August | Formula Two | (France) Louis Rosier | (Italy) Ferrari | Report |
| (United Kingdom) II Newcastle Journal Trophy | Charterhall | 15 August | Formula Two | (United Kingdom) Ken Wharton | (United Kingdom) Cooper-Bristol | Report |
| (France) V Circuit de Cadours | Cadours | 30 August | Formula Two | (France) Maurice Trintignant | (France) Gordini | Report |
| (United Kingdom) I RedeX Trophy | Snetterton | 12 September | Formula Two | (United Kingdom) Eric Thompson | (United Kingdom) Connaught-Lea Francis | Report |
| (Sweden) III Skarpnäcksloppet | Skarpnäck | 13 September | Formula One | (Sweden) Erik Lundgren | (United States) Ford | Report |
| (United Kingdom) I London Trophy | Crystal Palace | 19 September | Formula Two | (United Kingdom) Stirling Moss | (United Kingdom) Cooper-Alta | Report |
| (Italy) IV Gran Premio di Modena | Modena | 20 September | Formula Two | (Argentina) Juan Manuel Fangio | (Italy) Maserati | Report |
| (United Kingdom) VI Madgwick Cup | Goodwood | 26 September | Formula Two | (United Kingdom) Roy Salvadori | (United Kingdom) Connaught-Lea Francis | Report |
| (United Kingdom) II Joe Fry Memorial Trophy | Castle Combe | 3 October | Formula Two | (United Kingdom) Bob Gerard | (United Kingdom) Cooper-Bristol | Report |
| (United Kingdom) I Curtis Trophy | Snetterton | 17 October | Formula Two | (United Kingdom) Bob Gerard | (United Kingdom) Cooper-Bristol | Report |

=== East German races ===
| Race name | Circuit | Date | Winning driver | Constructor | Report |
|---|---|---|---|---|---|
| (East Germany) I Strassen-Rennen Karl-Marx-Stadt | Karl-Marx-Stadt | 3 May | (East Germany) Rudolf Krause | (West Germany) BMW-Reif | Report |
| (East Germany) I Paul Greifzu Gedachtnisrennen | Dessau | 7 June | (East Germany) Edgar Barth | (East Germany) EMW | Report |
| (East Germany) IV Strassen-rennen Halle-Saale-Schleife | Halle-Saale-Schleife | 5 July | (East Germany) Edgar Barth | (East Germany) EMW | Report |
| (East Germany) I Dresden Autobahnspinne | Dresden-Hellerau | 26 July | (East Germany) Edgar Barth | (East Germany) EMW | Report |
| (East Germany) V Sachsenringrennen | Sachsenring | 6 September | (East Germany) Edgar Barth | (East Germany) EMW-BMW | Report |
| (East Germany) II Bernau Autobahnschleife | Bernau | 27 September | (East Germany) Arthur Rosenhammer | (East Germany) EMW | Report |

The Bernau race was not part of the East German Championship.

=== East German Championship ===
The table below shows the points awarded for each race. Only East German drivers were eligible for points.

| Place | Driver | Entrant | Car | KAR | DES | HAL | DRE | SAC | Total |
|---|---|---|---|---|---|---|---|---|---|
| 1 | (East Germany) Edgar Barth | EMW Rennkollektiv | EMW 52/53-BMW 328 | | 6 | 6 | 6 | 6 | 24 |
| 2 | (East Germany) Rudolf Krause | Greifzu-Sühl | Greifzu-BMW 328 | 6 | 4 | 4 | | 4 | 18 |
| 3 | (East Germany) Karl Weber | BSG Motor | Werkmeister-BMW 328 | 4 | 3 | | | 2 | 9 |
| 4 | (East Germany) Ernst Klodwig | BSG Motor | Lodwig-Heck-BMW 328 | | | 2 | | 3 | 5 |
| 5 | (East Germany) Kurt Straubel | BSG Motor | Eigenbau-BMW 328 | | | | 4 | | 4 |
| 6 | (East Germany) Paul Thiel | EMW Rennkollektiv | EMW 52/53-BMW 328 | | | 3 | | | 3 |
| = | (East Germany) Heinz Melkus | BSGN Sedlitz | ARO-Veritas-Alfa Romeo | 3 | | | | | 3 |
| 8 | (East Germany) Bobby Kohlrauch | Greifzu-Sühl | Greifzu-BMW 328 | | 2 | | | | 2 |
