= Onofre Marimón =

Argentine racing driver (1923–1954)

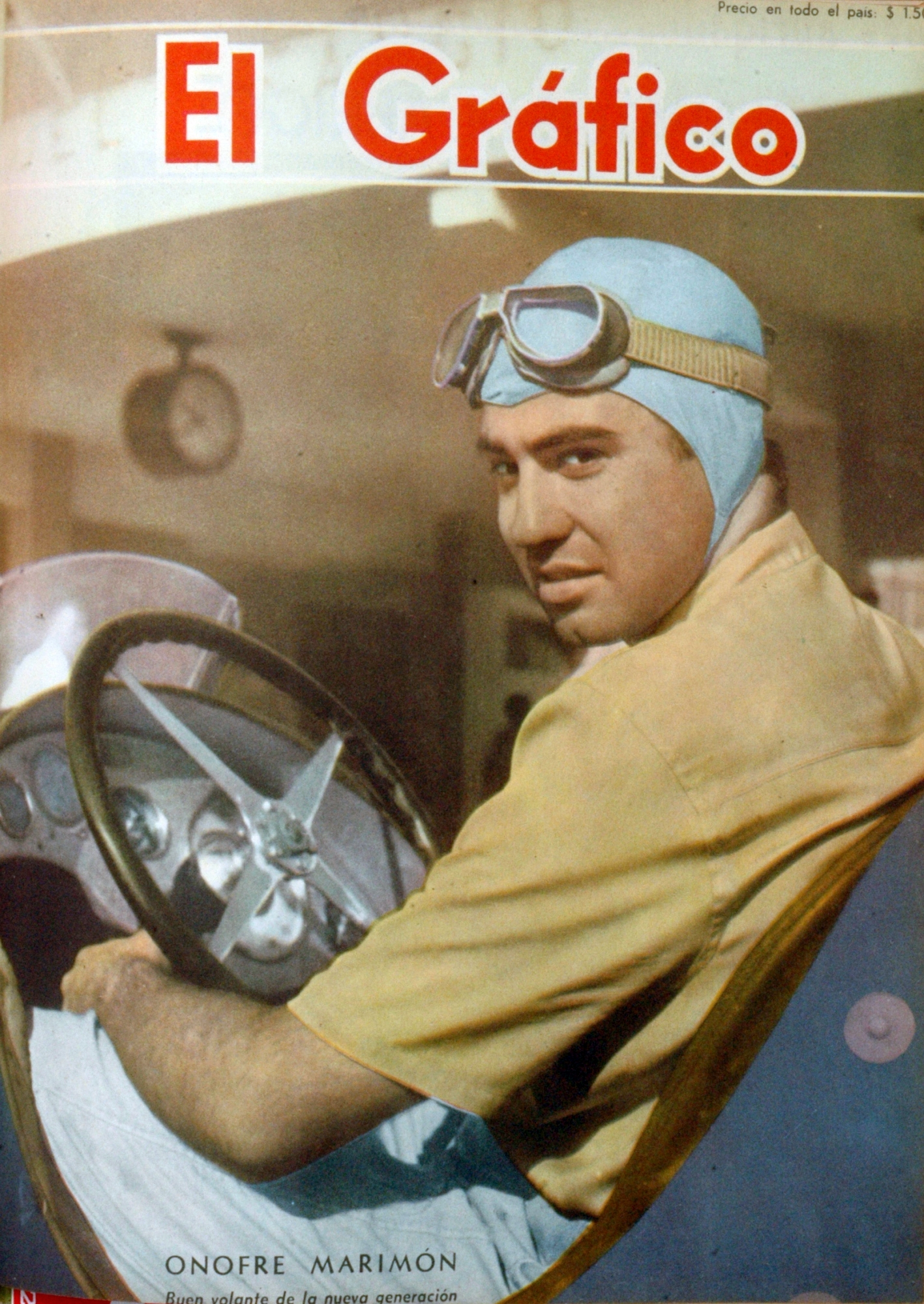
- Marimón in 1952, pictured on the cover of El Gráfico
- Born: Onofre Agustín Marimón; 19 December 1923; Zárate, Buenos Aires, Argentina
- Died: 31 July 1954 (aged 30); Nürburg, West Germany
- Cause of death: Injuries sustained at the 1954 German Grand Prix

Formula One World Championship career
- Nationality: (Argentina) Argentine
- Active years: 1951, 1953–1954
- Team(s): Milano, Maserati
- Entries: 12 (11 starts)
- Championships: 0
- Wins: 0
- Podiums: 2
- Career points: 8 1/7
- Pole positions: 0
- Fastest laps: 1
- First entry: 1951 French Grand Prix
- Last entry: 1954 German Grand Prix

Onofre Agustín Marimón (19 December 1923 – 31 July 1954) was an Argentine racing driver, who competed in Formula One at 12 Grands Prix between 1951 and 1954. (Note: The exact years Marimón competed in Formula One: 1951, 1953–1954.)

Marimón achieved two podiums at the 1953 Belgian and 1954 British Grands Prix, and scored a total of 8 1/7 championship points with Maserati. He also won the non-championship 1954 Rome Grand Prix, driving the Maserati 250F.

During practice for the 1954 German Grand Prix at the Nürburgring, Marimón died after losing control of his Maserati 250F, impacting a ditch and causing a rollover. He was the first fatality at a Formula One Grand Prix. (Note: Chet Miller became the first fatality in the Formula One World Championship at the 1953 Indianapolis 500, which was not a Grand Prix despite forming a round in the championship from 1950 to 1960.)

== Biography ==
Onofre Agustín Marimón was born on 19 December 1923 in Zárate, Buenos Aires, Argentina. Marimón was the son of racing driver and undertaker Domingo Marimón, the winner of the 1948 South American Grand Prix for Turismo Carretera. Marimón Sr. and Juan Manuel Fangio were team-mates for Chevrolet and friends, leading to Fangio becoming a mentor for Marimón Jr. when the young Zárateño moved to Europe.

Marimón was killed on 31 July 1954 during practice for the 1954 German Grand Prix, becoming the first driver to be fatally injured at a World Championship Grand Prix other than the Indianapolis 500. His Maserati left the Nürburgring race course at the Breidscheid curve near the Adenauer Bridge after he lost control attempting to improve his qualifying time. He died at the bottom of a steep and treacherous incline. He was going fast on a downgrade but failed to negotiate a sharp turn at the bottom. Marimón impacted a ditch, his Maserati shearing off a tree and rolling over a number of times. He was pinned underneath the car as it came to rest on its top with the wheels spinning in the air. Marimón was given the last rites by a Catholic priest before dying a few minutes after rescue workers freed him. It was thought that his braking unit failed.

Marimón's death trimmed the Maserati team to four drivers. His practice times had not been satisfactory enough for him to make the top-five for the 1954 German Grand Prix. His best time was 21.3 seconds behind the record time of 9:50.1 set by Fangio.

== Complete Formula One World Championship results ==
(key) (Races in italics indicate fastest lap)

Year	Entrant	Chassis	Engine	1	2	3	4	5	6	7	8	9	WDC	Points
1951	Scuderia Milano	Maserati 4CLT/50	Milano Straight-4	SUI	500	BEL	FRA; Ret	GBR	GER	ITA	ESP		NC	0
1953	Officine Alfieri Maserati	Maserati A6GCM	Maserati Straight-6	ARG	500	NED	BEL; 3	FRA; 9	GBR; Ret	GER; Ret	SUI; Ret	ITA; Ret	11th	4
1954	Officine Alfieri Maserati	Maserati 250F	Maserati Straight-6	ARG; Ret	500	BEL; Ret	FRA; Ret	GBR; 3	GER; DNS	SUI	ITA	ESP	13th	4 1/7

== Complete 24 Hours of Le Mans results ==
Year	Team	Co-Drivers	Car	Class	Laps	Pos.	Class Pos.
1951	(France) Henri Louveau	(Argentina) José Froilán González	Talbot-Lago T26 GS	S 5.0	128	DNF	
1953	(Italy) S.P.A. Alfa Romeo	(Argentina) Juan Manuel Fangio	Alfa Romeo 6C 3000 CM	S5.0	22	DNF; Engine	

== Non-Championship Formula One results ==
(key) (Races in bold indicate pole position; Races in italics indicate fastest lap)

Year	Entrant	Chassis	Engine	1	2	3	4	5	6	7	8	9	10	11	12	13	14	15	16	17	18	19	20	21	22	23	24	25	26	27	28	29	30	31	32	33	34	35	36	37	38	39
1953	Officine Alfieri Maserati	Maserati A6GCM	Maserati Straight-6	SYR	PAU	LAV	AST	BOR	INT	ELÄ	NAP	ULS	WIN	FRO	COR	EIF	ALB	PRI	GRE	ESS	MID	ROU	STR	CRY	AVU	USF	LAC; Ret	DRE	BRI	CHE	SAB	NEW	CAD	SAC	RED	SKA	LON	MOD; 2	MAD	BER	JOE	CUR
1954	Officine Alfieri Maserati	Maserati 250F	Maserati Straight-6	**SYR**; **5**	PAU; Ret	LAV	BOR	INT	BAR; 4	CUR	**ROM**; **1**	FRO	COR	BRC	CRY	ROU	CAE	AUG	COR	OUT	RED	PES	JOE	CAD	BER	GOO	DAI															

== Notes ==
Preceded by Charles de Tornaco	Formula One fatal accidents 31 July 1954	Succeeded by Mario Alborghetti
