= 1953 West Essex CC Formula 2 Race =

1953 West Essex Formula 2 Race

Race details
- Date: 27 June 1953
- Official name: II West Essex Formula 2 Race
- Location: Snetterton Circuit, Norfolk
- Course: Permanent racing facility
- Course length: 4.361 km (2.719 miles)
- Distance: 10 laps, 43.61 km (27.19 miles)

Fastest lap
Driver	(United Kingdom) Roy Salvadori	Connaught-Lea Francis
- Time: 1:51.2

Podium
First	(United Kingdom) Kenneth McAlpine	Connaught-Lea Francis
Second	(United Kingdom) John Coombs	Connaught-Lea Francis
Third	(United Kingdom) Rodney Nuckey	Cooper-Bristol

The 2nd West Essex CC Formula 2 Race was a Formula Two motor race held on 27 June 1953 at Snetterton Circuit, Norfolk. The race was run over 10 laps of the circuit, and was won by British driver Kenneth McAlpine in a Connaught Type A-Lea Francis. McAlpine's teammate John Coombs was second and Rodney Nuckey in a Cooper T23-Bristol was third. Roy Salvadori in another Connaught set fastest lap but retired on the last lap with engine failure.

== Results ==
Pos	No.	Driver	Entrant	Constructor	Time/Retired
1	63	(United Kingdom) Kenneth McAlpine	Connaught Engineering	Connaught Type A-Lea Francis	18:53.4, 138.03kph
2	62	(United Kingdom) John Coombs	Connaught Engineering	Connaught Type A-Lea Francis	+6.6s
3	1	(United Kingdom) Rodney Nuckey	Rodney Nuckey	Cooper T23-Bristol	+19.0s
4	61	(United Kingdom) Roy Salvadori	Connaught Engineering	Connaught Type A-Lea Francis	+1 lap, engine
5	6	(United Kingdom) Keith Hall	Border Reivers	Cooper T20-Bristol	+1 lap
6	64	(United Kingdom) Ben Wyatt	Ben Wyatt	Frazer Nash FN48	+1 lap
7	3	(United Kingdom) Bill Black	Bill Black	Frazer Nash Le Mans Replica	+1 lap
Ret.	10	(United Kingdom) Ian Stewart	Ecurie Ecosse	Connaught Type A-Lea Francis	8 laps, rear axle
Ret.	9	(United Kingdom) Peter Jopp	Emeryson Cars	Emeryson-Aston Martin	0 laps, engine
DNA	2	(United Kingdom) Leslie Marr	Leslie Marr	Connaught Type A-Lea Francis	
DNA	6	(United Kingdom) Jimmy Somervail	Border Reivers	Cooper T20-Bristol	car driven by Hall
DNA	14	(United Kingdom) Frank Copeland	Frank Copeland	Frazer Nash-BMW 328	
DNA	15	no driver listed	F.G. Greene	Frazer Nash Le Mans Replica	
DNA	57	(United Kingdom) John Barber	John Barber	Cooper T20-Bristol	
DNA	57	(United Kingdom) Richard Coleman	John Barber	Cooper T20-Bristol	

Previous race: 1953 Coupe de Printemps	Formula One non-championship races 1953 season	Next race: 1953 Midlands MECC Race
Previous race: 1952 West Essex CC Race	West Essex CC Formula 2 Race	Next race: —
