= Argentine Grand Prix =

Formula One Grand Prix

- Autódromo Oscar Alfredo Gálvez

Race information
- Number of times held: 21
- First held: 1953
- Last held: 1998
- Most wins (drivers): (Argentina) Juan Manuel Fangio (4)
- Most wins (constructors): (United Kingdom) Williams (4)
- Circuit length: 4.259 km (2.646 miles)
- Race length: 306.648 km (190.542 miles)
- Laps: 72

Last race (1998)

Pole position
- (United Kingdom) David Coulthard; McLaren-Mercedes; 1:25.852

Podium
- 1. (Germany) Michael Schumacher; Ferrari; 1:48:36.175; 2. (Finland) Mika Häkkinen; McLaren-Mercedes; +22.898; 3. (United Kingdom) Eddie Irvine; Ferrari; +57.745

Fastest lap
- (Austria) Alexander Wurz; Benetton-Playlife; 1:28.179

The Argentine Grand Prix (Spanish: Gran Premio de Argentina) was a round of the Formula One championship, held intermittently from 1953 to 1998, at the Autódromo Oscar y Juan Gálvez in the Argentine national capital of Buenos Aires.

== Origins and history ==
The Buenos Aires Grand Prix was an event first started in 1930 as a Formula Libre event held at the Costanera circuit until 1940 and switched to the Retiro circuit for 1941. After a six-year break and by then Juan Peron in office, racing resumed in 1947 at Retiro with the start of the South American "Temporada" Grand Prix series, competing twice that year under the Formula Libre regulations. Italian Luigi Villoresi won all 1947 Temporada events. The race regularly attracted Brazilian and European drivers and also Argentine drivers competing in Europe, such as Juan Manuel Fangio and José Froilán González. For the 1948 Grand Prix season, the race was moved to Palermo until the end of 1950. In 1951, the Costanera Norte circuit would host its last three Grand Prix events before completion of the Autodromo 17 de Octubre (October 17), a purpose-built circuit where the championship Formula One Argentine Grand Prix was held on different variants of the facility from 1953 to 1960, 1972 to 1981 and 1995 to 1998.

=== Buenos Aires ===
Built in 1952 on swampland just outside Buenos Aires, the circuit featured a white archway dedicated to the memory of Admiral William Brown. The circuit opened in March 1952 with the fifth edition of the "Perón Cup", which was won by Juan Manuel Fangio and in 1953, hosted the first Formula One race to be held in South America.

The track featured four different configurations for Grand Prix racing. From 1953 to 1960, the Argentine Grand Prix was held on the "No. 2" layout, clockwise for all these years except 1954, when it was run counterclockwise. From 1971 to 1973 the race was held on the "No. 9" configuration, more or less the same as the "No. 2" configuration but for the section after Tobogan which was shortened and the Horquilla turn was made tighter and shorter. Then from 1974 to 1981, the race was run on the "No. 15" configuration, the longest and fastest layout that combined two very fast successive right and left hand corners with two long straights and a spectacular long and wide third corner (called the Curvon Salotto) into the infield section from the previous "No. 9" configuration. For the period from 1995 to 1998, the race was held on the twisty "No. 6" configuration using only the infield section with the S-shaped Los Mixos chicane.

==== 1953–1960 ====
The 1953 race saw Fangio retire his Maserati after 36 laps due to a transmission failure; Alberto Ascari's victory for Ferrari was overshadowed by an accident which killed nine people and injured many others due to overcrowding along the track. The race was heavily advertised and it is believed that around 400,000 people turned up for the event. The facility was so packed that people were standing on the edges of corners, inches away from the cars apexing the corners.

The following year, the circuit was run in an anticlockwise direction, and Fangio did reach the top of the podium, winning his home Grand Prix on his second attempt; he would go on to win the next three Grands Prix in Argentina, one of which was the 1955 race. It was one of the hottest races on record, at 40C (104F) with track temperatures reaching 51C (122F). Fangio, now driving for Mercedes, was the only driver to complete the 96 laps after three hours without handing his car over to another driver. One of his legs was badly burned by a chassis tube heated by the exhaust, an injury that forced a three-month recovery. In 1958, Stirling Moss took the win, in the penultimate race in Fangio's career. It was also the first Formula One championship victory for a rear or mid-engined car and the first for a privateer. New Zealander Bruce McLaren won in 1960. With Fangio's retirement and the subsequent retirement of fellow Argentine driver José Froilán González, combined with unstable governments after the exile of Peron (in 1955), the Argentine Grand Prix disappeared from the F1 calendar in 1961 for over a decade.

==== 1971–1981 ====
A non-championship Formula One race was held at Buenos Aires in 1971, won by Chris Amon over two heats. In 1972 the Argentine Grand Prix returned to the World Championship, with Carlos Reutemann emerging as the new home favorite. The variant used for these two years was similar to the one used before, except the straight leading into the hairpin after the Toboggan esses was shortened. Reutemann took pole position in his world championship debut, becoming only the second driver to achieve this feat. The race was won by world champion Jackie Stewart. 1973 saw Emerson Fittipaldi take victory at the last part of the race from Frenchman François Cevert.

For 1974, the circuit used the faster and longer No. 15 circuit, which included two very fast and slightly banked corners that led into a section that went around a lake, which included a 0.91 km (3,000 ft) long straight that led into a flat-out right handed 180 corner called the Curvon, and this led into a 1.2 km (4,000 ft) straight which returned to the twisty arena that had always been used before. The cars were flat-out for 45 whole seconds throughout this whole lake loop: overtaking was rife on this part of the circuit. During the 1974 race, homeland hero Reutemann so very nearly took victory, but the Brabham mechanics apparently did not put enough fuel in the Argentine's car and he ran out, and victory went to veteran New Zealander Denny Hulme. 1977 saw South African Jody Scheckter take an amazing victory in the Walter Wolf team's first ever Grand Prix in extremely hot weather, and 1978 saw Mario Andretti begin his domination of that season, driving for Lotus. 1979 was an exciting race, the race started with a huge accident at the first two very fast esses; Scheckter and John Watson in a McLaren collided and took out nine cars; six of whom were eliminated on the spot. The race was restarted, and the blue Ligiers of Frenchmen Jacques Laffite and Patrick Depailler lead much of the proceedings, but the wily Reutemann, now driving for Lotus, drove methodically through the field and pressed Laffite, but could not catch the flying Frenchman, and Reutemann finished 2nd.

In 1980, the drivers, led by Emerson Fittipaldi attempted to boycott the race due to the poor state of the track; the new surface was breaking up in many spots because of the hot weather and the extreme suction of the ground-effect cars of the time, and gravel was strewn all over the track from the cracks in the tarmac. The race went ahead anyway after some repairs (which proved not to be good enough, and the track broke up again) and Australian Alan Jones in a Williams, Brazilian Nelson Piquet in a Brabham, Canadian Gilles Villeneuve, Laffite and Reutemann all battled for top positions; Reutemann went out early with engine problems after he went off the circuit after attempting to pass Piquet and he got grass in his radiators. Because of the track breaking apart and being littered with gravel, Jones went off twice at the Ombu section and was passed by Laffite, Villeneuve and Piquet (who all went off at other parts of the track); and he went into the pits, got the grass out of his radiators and came out in 4th. He charged through the field and passed Villeneuve and Piquet; Laffite retired with engine problems; and the Australian took victory followed by Piquet and Keke Rosberg scoring his first podium finish; and Frenchman Alain Prost scored one point in his debut F1 race, driving for McLaren. The 1981 race, which was held in cooler April weather, was a Brabham procession; designer Gordon Murray found a way to circumvent the new regulations with a hydropneumatic suspension which lowered the cars closer to the ground; and therefore were faster around corners than everyone else. Piquet took victory, Reutemann finished 2nd and Prost took 3rd.

The 1982 round was supposed to be held in early March, but the political fallout during the drivers strike just before the South African Grand Prix caused the sponsors of the Argentine Grand Prix to back out of the race; and the race was initially postponed five weeks before it was due to take place; and then the Argentine political situation was problematic and they also entered a brief war with the United Kingdom over the Falkland Islands in early April, and within the context of an entirely European sport that consisted mostly of British organizations, this caused the Argentine organizers' contract to be terminated. An attempt to bring back the Argentine Grand Prix to the same circuit in Buenos Aires in 1986 did not work out, and the race did not return for nine years.

==== 1995–1998 ====
A private consortium purchased the Buenos Aires track in 1991, renamed it and began to upgrade it. They secured a place on the 1994 F1 season calendar, but the race (set for October) was aborted to continue modernization. The general layout was not changed, but an "S" chicane named after Ayrton Senna was added. The No. 6 arena circuit was used, which did not include the flat-out lake run. This tight, twisty circuit was extremely criticized by Formula One drivers (who were already feeling the effects of other winding tracks such as Monaco, Hungaroring and Aida) and it was very difficult to pass on this variant because of the corners being so close together. The modernized Argentine Grand Prix returned in 1995, with victory going to Damon Hill. Hill won the event again in 1996 (his championship season), and in 1997 Jacques Villeneuve won the race in his championship season.

The organizers of the event ran into financial difficulties, and the 1998 race was the last running of the Argentine Grand Prix, the checkered flag waving victory to Michael Schumacher, in his ninth win for Ferrari.

==== Absence ====
A race was scheduled for 1999, but was cancelled pre-season, leaving a five-week gap between the opening two rounds of the 1999 championship.

In February 2012, Argentine president Cristina Fernandez de Kirchner announced that negotiations were coming to a close to bring the Grand Prix back to the country by 2013, this time at a street circuit to be created in the seaside resort city of Mar del Plata, scotching stories which surfaced in December 2011 that suggested a new circuit, being constructed at Zárate, was to target F1. Contracts were expected to be signed in May 2012, but this did not happen. Bernie Ecclestone, commercial rights holder of Formula One, said "we are open to racing in Argentina when I can deal with serious people".

== Winners ==
=== By year ===
No. 15 configuration (1974–1981)

No. 9 configuration (1971–1973)

No. 2 configuration (1953–1960) (anti-clockwise in 1954)

A pink background indicates an event which was not part of the Formula One World Championship.

Year	Driver	Constructor	Location	Report
1953	(Italy) Alberto Ascari	Ferrari	Buenos Aires No. 2	Report
1954	(Argentina) Juan Manuel Fangio	Maserati	Buenos Aires No. 2	Report
1955	(Argentina) Juan Manuel Fangio	Mercedes	Buenos Aires No. 2	Report
1956	(Italy) Luigi Musso (Argentina) Juan Manuel Fangio	Ferrari	Buenos Aires No. 2	Report
1957	(Argentina) Juan Manuel Fangio	Maserati	Buenos Aires No. 2	Report
1958	(United Kingdom) Stirling Moss	Cooper-Climax	Buenos Aires No. 2	Report
1959	Not held			
1960	(New Zealand) Bruce McLaren	Cooper-Climax	Buenos Aires No. 2	Report
1961 — 1970	Not held			
1971	(New Zealand) Chris Amon	Matra	Buenos Aires No. 9	Report
1972	(United Kingdom) Jackie Stewart	Tyrrell-Ford	Buenos Aires No. 9	Report
1973	(Brazil) Emerson Fittipaldi	Lotus-Ford	Buenos Aires No. 9	Report
1974	(New Zealand) Denny Hulme	McLaren-Ford	Buenos Aires No. 15	Report
1975	(Brazil) Emerson Fittipaldi	McLaren-Ford	Buenos Aires No. 15	Report
1976	Not held			
1977	(South Africa) Jody Scheckter	Wolf-Ford	Buenos Aires No. 15	Report
1978	(United States) Mario Andretti	Lotus-Ford	Buenos Aires No. 15	Report
1979	(France) Jacques Laffite	Ligier-Ford	Buenos Aires No. 15	Report
1980	(Australia) Alan Jones	Williams-Ford	Buenos Aires No. 15	Report
1981	(Brazil) Nelson Piquet	Brabham-Ford	Buenos Aires No. 15	Report
1982 – 1994	Not held			
1995	(United Kingdom) Damon Hill	Williams-Renault	Buenos Aires No. 6	Report
1996	(United Kingdom) Damon Hill	Williams-Renault	Buenos Aires No. 6	Report
1997	(Canada) Jacques Villeneuve	Williams-Renault	Buenos Aires No. 6	Report
1998	(Germany) Michael Schumacher	Ferrari	Buenos Aires No. 6	Report

=== Repeat winners (drivers) ===
Wins	Driver	Years won
4	(Argentina) Juan Manuel Fangio	1954, 1955, 1956, 1957
2	(Brazil) Emerson Fittipaldi	1973, 1975
2	(United Kingdom) Damon Hill	1995, 1996

=== Repeat winners (constructors) ===
Teams in bold are competing in the Formula One championship in 2026.

Wins	Constructor	Years won
4	**(United Kingdom) Williams**	1980, 1995, 1996, 1997
3	**(Italy) Ferrari**	1953, 1956, 1998
2	(Italy) Maserati	1954, 1957
2	(United Kingdom) Cooper	1958, 1960
2	**(United Kingdom) McLaren**	1974, 1975
2	(United Kingdom) Lotus	1973, 1978

=== Repeat winners (engine manufacturers) ===
Manufacturers in bold are competing in the Formula One championship in 2026.

Wins	Manufacturer	Years won
9	(United States) Ford *	1972, 1973, 1974, 1975, 1977, 1978, 1979, 1980, 1981
3	(France) Renault	1995, 1996, 1997
3	**(Italy) Ferrari**	1953, 1956, 1998
2	(Italy) Maserati	1954, 1957
2	(United Kingdom) Climax	1958, 1960

* Designed and built by Cosworth, funded by Ford
