= Rodney Nuckey =

British racing driver (1929–2000)

- Born: 26 June 1929; Wood Green, London, England
- Died: 29 June 2000 (aged 71); Manila, Philippines

Formula One World Championship career
- Nationality: (United Kingdom) British
- Active years: 1953-1954
- Team: Privateer Cooper
- Entries: 2 (1 start)
- Championships: 0
- Wins: 0
- Podiums: 0
- Career points: 0
- Pole positions: 0
- Fastest laps: 0
- First entry: 1953 German Grand Prix
- Last entry: 1954 British Grand Prix

Rodney York Nuckey (26 June 1929 in Wood Green, London – 29 June 2000 in Manila, Philippines) was a British racing driver from England. He started in 500cc Formula 3. He entered two Formula One World Championship Grands Prix, debuting on 2 August 1953, although his place in the 1954 British Grand Prix was ultimately taken by Eric Brandon. Nuckey scored no championship points, but he finished third in the non-championship Syracuse Grand Prix in 1953, and took part in many other non-Championship Formula One races.

== Complete Formula One World Championship results ==
(key)

Year	Entrant	Chassis	Engine	1	2	3	4	5	6	7	8	9	WDC	Points
1953	Rodney Nuckey	Cooper T23	Bristol Straight-6	ARG	500	NED	BEL	FRA	GBR	GER; 11	SUI	ITA	NC	0
1954	Ecurie Richmond	Cooper T23	Bristol Straight-6	ARG	500	BEL	FRA	GBR; DNS	GER	SUI	ITA	ESP	NC	0
