= 1953 Eläintarhanajot =

Race details
- Date: 10 May 1953
- Official name: XV Eläintarhanajot
- Location: Helsinki, Finland
- Course: Eläintarha
- Course length: 2.000 km (1.247 miles)
- Distance: 25 laps, 50.00 km (31.17 miles)

Pole position
Driver	(United Kingdom) Rodney Nuckey	Cooper-Bristol

Podium
First	(United Kingdom) Rodney Nuckey	Cooper-Bristol
Second	(Belgium) Roger Laurent	Ferrari
Third	(Sweden) Gunnar Carlsson	Ford Special

The XV Eläintarhajot was a non-championship Formula One motor race held at Eläintarha, Helsinki on 10 May 1953. The race was won by Rodney Nuckey in a Cooper T23-Bristol, starting from pole position. Roger Laurent was second in a Talbot-Lago T26C and Gunnar Carlsson third in a Ford Special.

== Results ==
Pos	No.	Driver	Entrant	Car	Time/Retired	Grid
1	7	(United Kingdom) Rodney Nuckey	Rodney Nuckey	Cooper T23-Bristol	28:55.2, 103.71kph	1
2	6	(Belgium) Roger Laurent	Ecurie Francorchamps	Talbot-Lago T26C	+0.6s	6
3	52	(Sweden) Gunnar Carlsson	Gunnar Carlsson	Ford Special	+1.2s	4
4	13	(Finland) Leo Mattila	Leo Mattila	Cooper T12-JAP	+3.3s	2
5	5	(Norway) Carl Stausland	Carl Stausland	Ford Special	+24.1s	7
6	72	(Sweden) Gunnar Wahlberg	Gunnar Wahlberg	BMW 328	+1:34.8	5
Ret	11	(Finland) Evert Saloranta		Ford Special	8 laps	
Ret	49	(Sweden) Erik Lundgren	Erik Lundgren	Ford Special	clutch	3
Ret	32	(Finland) Uuno Lamminen		Allard J2	6 laps	
DNA	9	(Belgium) Charles de Tornaco	Charles de Tornaco	Talbot-Lago T26C		
DNA	14	(Finland) Niilo Uski		BMW		
DNA	15	(Finland) Arre Sinkilä		Steyr		
DNA	16	(Finland) Lars Åström		Ford Special		
DNA	17	(Finland) Eero Viitala		Ford Special		

Previous race: 1953 BRDC International Trophy	Formula One non-championship races 1953 season	Next race: 1953 Naples Grand Prix
Previous race: 1952 Eläintarhanajot	Eläintarhanajot	Next race: 1954 Eläintarhanajot
