= Pablo Birger =

Argentine racing driver (1924–1966)

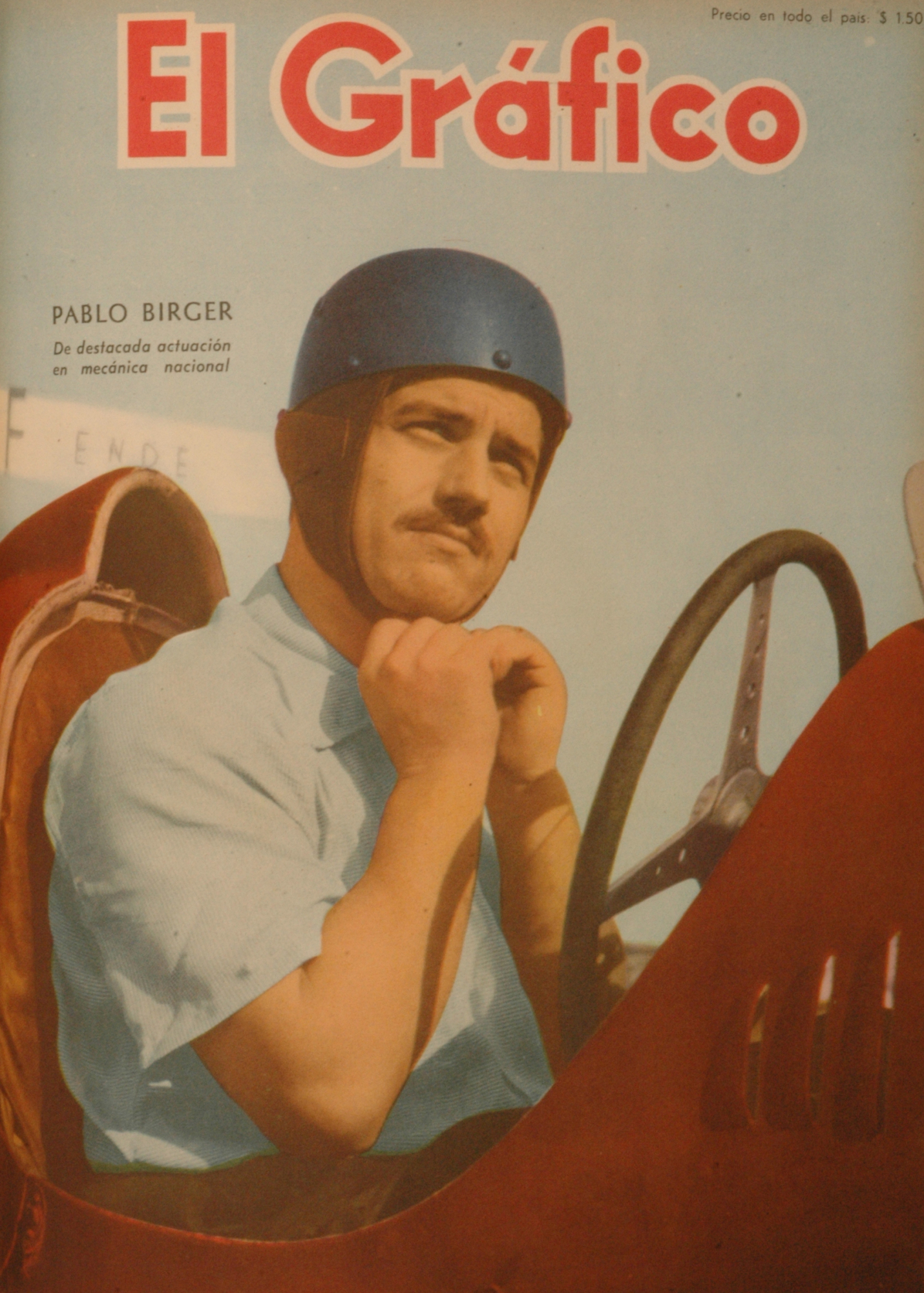
- Born: 7 January 1924; Buenos Aires, Argentina
- Died: 9 March 1966 (aged 42); Buenos Aires, Argentina

Formula One World Championship career
- Nationality: (Argentina) Argentine
- Active years: 1953, 1955
- Team: Gordini
- Entries: 2
- Championships: 0
- Wins: 0
- Podiums: 0
- Career points: 0
- Pole positions: 0
- Fastest laps: 0
- First entry: 1953 Argentine Grand Prix
- Last entry: 1955 Argentine Grand Prix

Pablo Birger (7 January 1924 – 9 March 1966) was an Argentine racing driver who raced in two World Championship Grands Prix for the Gordini team. He raced a Gordini Type 15 in the 1953 Argentine Grand Prix but the car lasted just twenty-one laps. Two years later, he again rented a seat with Gordini, this time racing a Type 16, but spun on the first lap and collided with Carlos Menditeguy.

Birger, who was born in Buenos Aires, died in a road accident in his native city at the age of 42.

== Complete Formula One World Championship results ==
(key)

Year	Entrant	Chassis	Engine	1	2	3	4	5	6	7	8	9	WDC	Points
1953	Equipe Gordini	Gordini Type 15	Gordini Straight-4	ARG; Ret	500	NED	BEL	FRA	GBR	GER	SUI	ITA	NC	0
1955	Equipe Gordini	Gordini Type 16	Gordini Straight-6	ARG; Ret	MON	500	BEL	NED	GBR	ITA			NC	0
