= 1954 German Grand Prix =

← Previous race	Next race →
- Nürburgring layout

Race details
- Date: 1 August 1954
- Official name: XVII Großer Preis von Deutschland a.k.a. Großer Preis von Europa
- Location: Nürburgring, Nürburg, West Germany
- Course: Permanent road course
- Course length: 22.810 km (14.173 miles)
- Distance: 22 laps, 501.820 km (311.806 miles)
- Weather: Sunny, dry

Pole position
Driver	(Argentina) Juan Manuel Fangio	Mercedes
- Time: 9:50.1

Fastest lap
Driver	(West Germany) Karl Kling	Mercedes
- Time: 9:55.1

Podium
First	(Argentina) Juan Manuel Fangio	Mercedes
Second	(Argentina) José Froilán González; (United Kingdom) Mike Hawthorn	Ferrari
Third	(France) Maurice Trintignant	Ferrari

The 1954 German Grand Prix was a Formula One motor race held at Nürburgring on 1 August 1954. It was race 6 of 9 in the 1954 World Championship of Drivers. It was the 17th German Grand Prix since the race was first held in 1926 and the 16th to be held at the Nürburgring complex of circuits. The race was won by 1951 world champion, Argentine driver Juan Manuel Fangio driving a Mercedes-Benz W196. Ferrari 625 drivers Mike Hawthorn (in a shared drive with José Froilán González) and Maurice Trintignant finished second and third for Scuderia Ferrari.

== Race report ==
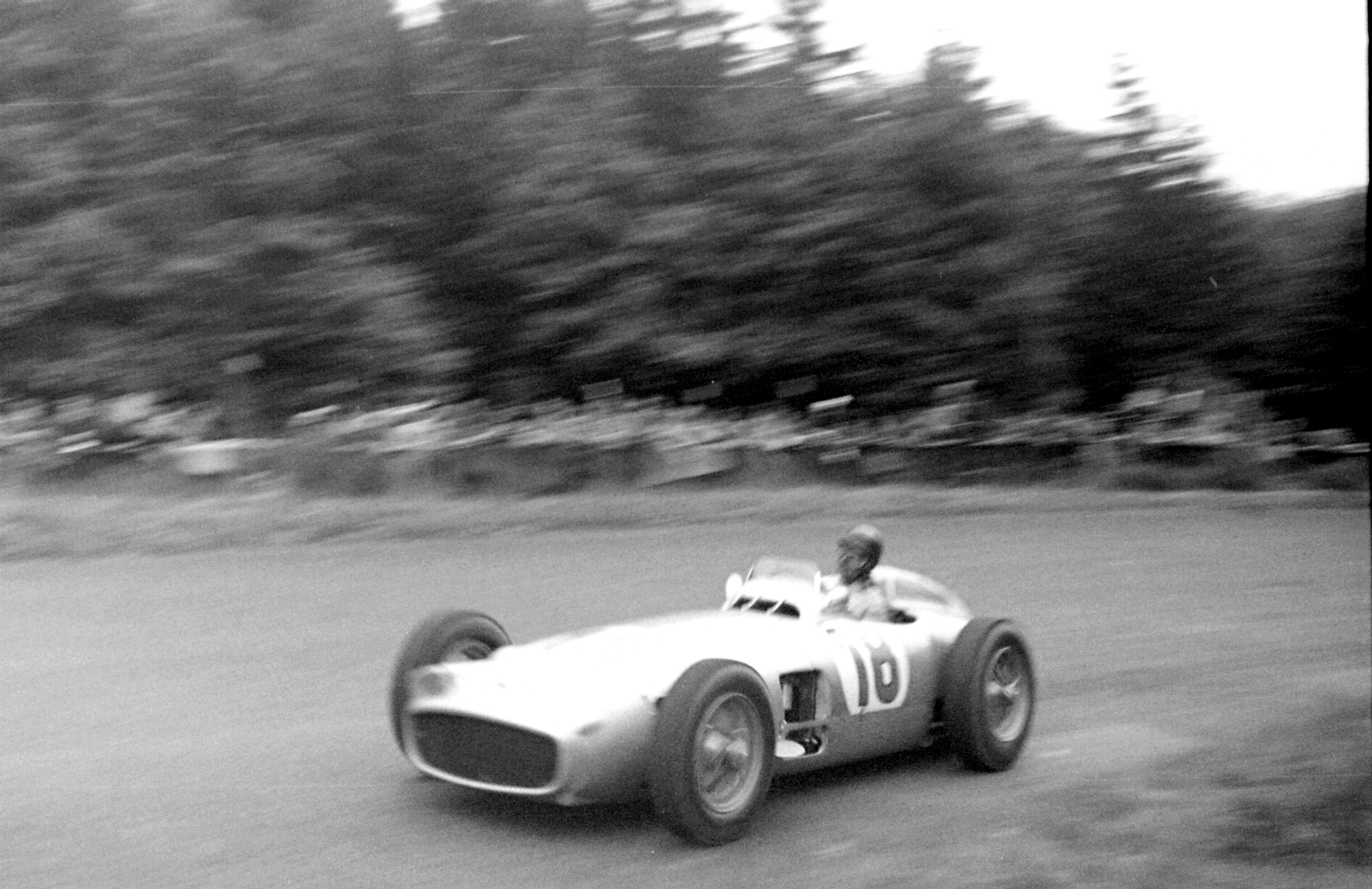
Juan Manuel Fangio won the 1954 German Grand Prix driving a Mercedes-Benz W196.

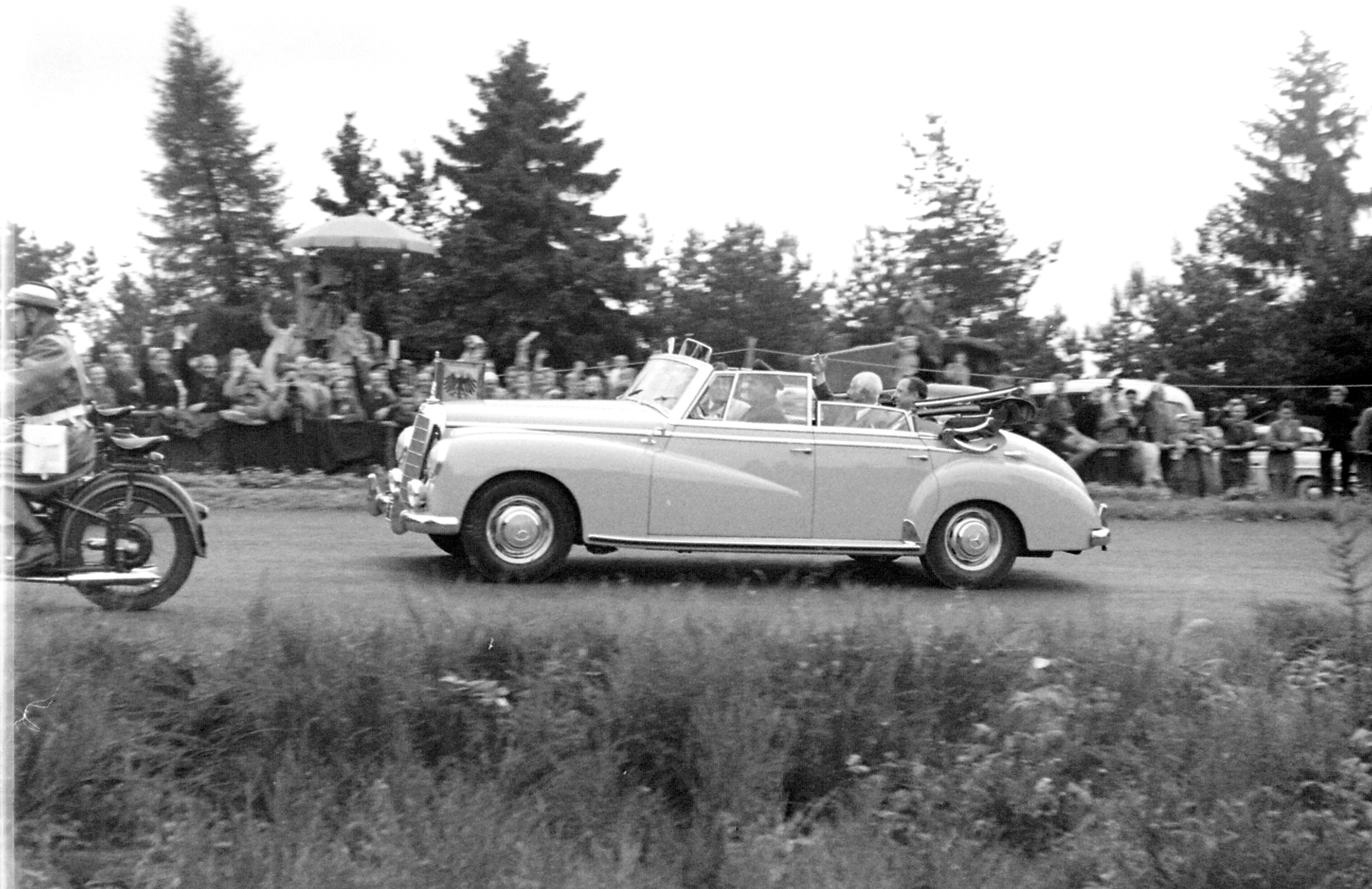
President Theodor Heuss visits the racetrack.

The race was lengthened from 18 to 22 laps, bringing the German Grand Prix up to the approximately 500 kilometre race distance used by the majority of Formula One Grands Prix at the time. Mercedes had brought to the Nürburgring their new open-wheeled version of the W196 for Fangio, Kling and Hermann Lang (in a one-off drive) after Mercedes's defeat at Silverstone in their streamlined cars. Hans Herrmann drove a streamlined W196s. Qualifying saw Fangio take pole position from Hawthorn, but practice was marred by the death of official Maserati driver Onofre Marimón. Going into the Wehrseifen slight right hand/sharp left hand turn, Marimón's Maserati 250F failed to negotiate the corner while going down the downhill run to the corner, plunged down an embankment, the car somersaulted. Marimón was given the last rites by a Catholic priest before dying a few minutes after rescue workers freed him. Marimón's teammate Luigi Villoresi withdrew from the race, as did the Maserati of Ken Wharton (entered by Owen Racing) but the team's third car for Sergio Mantovani made the race start. Stirling Moss qualified third in his privately entered Maserati 250F ahead of Hans Herrmann (Mercedes-Benz W196s), Gonzalez and Paul Frère (Gordini T16).

Fangio and Karl Kling led the way in their two Mercedes. Hawthorn was an early retirement with a broken axle as were Moss, Frère and privateer Maserati driver Roberto Mieres. Hermann Lang, one of the pre-war stars of the Mercedes 'silver arrows' spun out of his final Grand Prix appearance after ten laps. Gonzalez started and was running third but was so upset by Marimón's death he was called in after 16 laps to hand over to Hawthorn, who set off in pursuit of the Mercedes. He moved into second when Kling pitted and pursued Fangio relentlessly. Late in the race, drizzle forced him to slow and he held second from Trintignant. Kling finished fourth ahead of Mantovani, the last driver to travel the full race distance, getting some points for a saddened Maserati. Kling claimed the fastest lap point.

Just ten of the 23 qualifiers finished the gruelling race. With an elapsed time of 3 hours 45 minutes 45.8 seconds this was the longest (non Indy 500) F1 championship race in history, until the 2011 Canadian Grand Prix, which lasted just over four hours (but in this case it's also considered the time with race suspended). The win pushed Fangio further ahead in the championship, now to the point where he had more than double the points of his nearest rival Gonzalez. A win in the next race at the Swiss Grand Prix could wrap up his second championship.

== Entries ==
Team	No	Driver	Car	Engine	Tyre
(Italy) Scuderia Ferrari	1	(Argentina) José Froilán González	Ferrari 625 F1	Ferrari 625 2.5 L4	P
(Italy) Scuderia Ferrari	2	(France) Maurice Trintignant	Ferrari 625 F1	Ferrari 625 2.5 L4	P
(Italy) Scuderia Ferrari	3	(United Kingdom) Mike Hawthorn	Ferrari 625 F1	Ferrari 625 2.5 L4	P
(Italy) Scuderia Ferrari	4	(Italy) Piero Taruffi	Ferrari 625 F1	Ferrari 625 2.5 L4	P
(Italy) Officine Alfieri Maserati	5	(Italy) Luigi Villoresi	Maserati A6GCM/Maserati 250F	Maserati A6 2.0 L6/Maserati 250F1 2.5 L6	P
(Italy) Officine Alfieri Maserati	6	(Argentina) Onofre Marimón	Maserati A6GCM/Maserati 250F	Maserati A6 2.0 L6/Maserati 250F1 2.5 L6	P
(Italy) Officine Alfieri Maserati	7	(Italy) Sergio Mantovani	Maserati A6GCM/Maserati 250F	Maserati A6 2.0 L6/Maserati 250F1 2.5 L6	P
(Italy) Officine Alfieri Maserati	8	(Argentina) Roberto Mieres	Maserati A6GCM/Maserati 250F	Maserati A6 2.0 L6/Maserati 250F1 2.5 L6	P
(France) Equipe Gordini	9	(France) Jean Behra	Gordini T16	Gordini 23 2.5 L6	E
(France) Equipe Gordini	10	(Belgium) Paul Frère	Gordini T16	Gordini 23 2.5 L6	E
(France) Equipe Gordini	11	(Argentina) Clemar Bucci	Gordini T16	Gordini 23 2.5 L6	E
(France) Equipe Gordini	12	(Belgium) André Pilette	Gordini T16	Gordini 23 2.5 L6	E
(Thailand) Birabongse Bhanudej	14	(Thailand) Prince Bira	Maserati 250F	Maserati 250F1 2.5 L6	P
(United States) Harry Schell	15	(United States) Harry Schell	Maserati 250F	Maserati 250F1 2.5 L6	P
(United Kingdom) A.E. Moss	16	(United Kingdom) Stirling Moss	Maserati 250F	Maserati 250F1 2.5 L6	P
(United Kingdom) Owen Racing Organisation	17	(United Kingdom) Ken Wharton	Maserati 250F	Maserati 250F1 2.5 L6	P
(Germany) Daimler Benz AG	18	(Argentina) Juan Manuel Fangio	Mercedes-Benz W196	Mercedes M196 2.5 L8	C
(Germany) Daimler Benz AG	19	(Germany) Karl Kling	Mercedes-Benz W196	Mercedes M196 2.5 L8	C
(Germany) Daimler Benz AG	20	(Germany) Hans Herrmann	Mercedes-Benz W196	Mercedes M196 2.5 L8	C
(Germany) Daimler Benz AG	21	(Germany) Hermann Lang	Mercedes-Benz W196	Mercedes M196 2.5 L8	C
(Germany) Hans Klenk	22	(West Germany) Theo Helfrich	Klenk Meteor	BMW 328 2.0 L6	P D
(France) Ecurie Rosier	24	(France) Robert Manzon	Ferrari 625 F1	Ferrari 625 2.5 L4	P D
(France) Ecurie Rosier	25	(France) Louis Rosier	Ferrari 625 F1	Ferrari 625 2.5 L4	P D

== Classification ==
=== Qualifying ===
Pos	No	Driver	Constructor	Time	Gap
1	18	(Argentina) Juan Manuel Fangio	Mercedes	9:50.1	—
2	3	(United Kingdom) Mike Hawthorn	Ferrari	9:53.3	+ 3.2
3	16	(United Kingdom) Stirling Moss	Maserati	10:00.7	+ 10.6
4	20	(Germany) Hans Herrmann	Mercedes	10:01.5	+ 11.4
5	1	(Argentina) José Froilán González	Ferrari	10:01.8	+ 11.7
6	10	(Belgium) Paul Frère	Gordini	10:05.9	+ 15.8
7	2	(France) Maurice Trintignant	Ferrari	10:07.5	+ 17.4
8	6	(Argentina) Onofre Marimón	Maserati	10:11.3	+ 21.2
9	9	(France) Jean Behra	Gordini	10:11.9	+ 21.8
10	5	(Italy) Luigi Villoresi	Maserati	Unknown	—
11	21	(Germany) Hermann Lang	Mercedes	10:13.1	+ 23.0
12	24	(France) Robert Manzon	Ferrari	10:16.1	+ 26.0
13	4	(Italy) Piero Taruffi	Ferrari	10:23.0	+ 32.9
14	15	(United States) Harry Schell	Maserati	10:28.7	+ 38.6
15	7	(Italy) Sergio Mantovani	Maserati	10:39.1	+ 49.0
16	11	(Argentina) Clemar Bucci	Gordini	10:43.7	+ 53.6
17	8	(Argentina) Roberto Mieres	Maserati	10:47.0	+ 56.9
18	25	(France) Louis Rosier	Ferrari	11:04.3	+ 1:14.2
19	14	(Thailand) Prince Bira	Maserati	11:10.3	+ 1:20.2
20	12	(Belgium) André Pilette	Gordini	11:13.4	+ 1:23.2
21	22	(West Germany) Theo Helfrich	Klenk-BMW	11:18.3	+ 1:28.2
22	17	(United Kingdom) Ken Wharton	Maserati	No time	—
23	19	(Germany) Karl Kling	Mercedes	No time	—

=== Race ===
Pos	No	Driver	Constructor	Laps	Time/Retired	Grid	Points
1	18	(Argentina) Juan Manuel Fangio	Mercedes	22	3:45:45.8	1	8
2	1	(Argentina) José Froilán González (United Kingdom) Mike Hawthorn	Ferrari	22	+1:36.5	5	3; 3
3	2	(France) Maurice Trintignant	Ferrari	22	+5:08.6	7	4
4	19	(West Germany) Karl Kling	Mercedes	22	+6:06.5	23	4^{1}
5	7	(Italy) Sergio Mantovani	Maserati	22	+8:50.5	15	2
6	4	(Italy) Piero Taruffi	Ferrari	21	+1 lap	13	
7	15	(United States) Harry Schell	Maserati	21	+1 lap	14	
8	25	(France) Louis Rosier	Ferrari	21	+1 lap	18	
9	24	(France) Robert Manzon	Ferrari	20	+2 laps	12	
10	9	(France) Jean Behra	Gordini	20	+2 laps	9	
Ret	14	(Thailand) Prince Bira	Maserati	18	Steering	19	
Ret	21	(West Germany) Hermann Lang	Mercedes	10	Spun Off	11	
Ret	11	(Argentina) Clemar Bucci	Gordini	8	Wheel	16	
Ret	22	(West Germany) Theo Helfrich	Klenk-BMW	8	Engine	21	
Ret	20	(West Germany) Hans Herrmann	Mercedes	7	Fuel Leak	4	
Ret	10	(Belgium) Paul Frère	Gordini	4	Wheel	6	
Ret	3	(United Kingdom) Mike Hawthorn	Ferrari	3	Transmission	2	
Ret	8	(Argentina) Roberto Mieres	Maserati	2	Fuel Leak	17	
Ret	16	(United Kingdom) Stirling Moss	Maserati	1	Wheel Bearing	3	
Ret	12	(Belgium) André Pilette	Gordini	0	Suspension	20	
DNS	6	(Argentina) Onofre Marimón	Maserati		Fatal Crash in Practice	8	
DNS	5	(Italy) Luigi Villoresi	Maserati		Withdrawn	10	
DNS	17	(United Kingdom) Ken Wharton	Maserati		Withdrawn	22	

Notes

- ^1 – Includes 1 point for fastest lap

== Shared drive ==
- Car #1: González (16 laps), then Hawthorn (6 laps)

== Championship standings after the race ==
Drivers' Championship standings

	Pos	Driver	Points
	1	(Argentina) Juan Manuel Fangio	36 1/7
	2	(Argentina) José Froilán González	17 9/14
	3	(France) Maurice Trintignant	15
1	4	(United Kingdom) Mike Hawthorn	10 9/14
3	5	(Germany) Karl Kling	10

- Note: Only the top five positions are included. Only the best 5 results counted towards the Championship.

Previous race: 1954 British Grand Prix	FIA Formula One World Championship; 1954 season	Next race: 1954 Swiss Grand Prix
Previous race: 1953 German Grand Prix	German Grand Prix	Next race: 1956 German Grand Prix
Previous race: 1952 Belgian Grand Prix	European Grand Prix (Designated European Grand Prix)	Next race: 1955 Monaco Grand Prix
