= Paul Greifzu =

East German motorsport racer and constructor

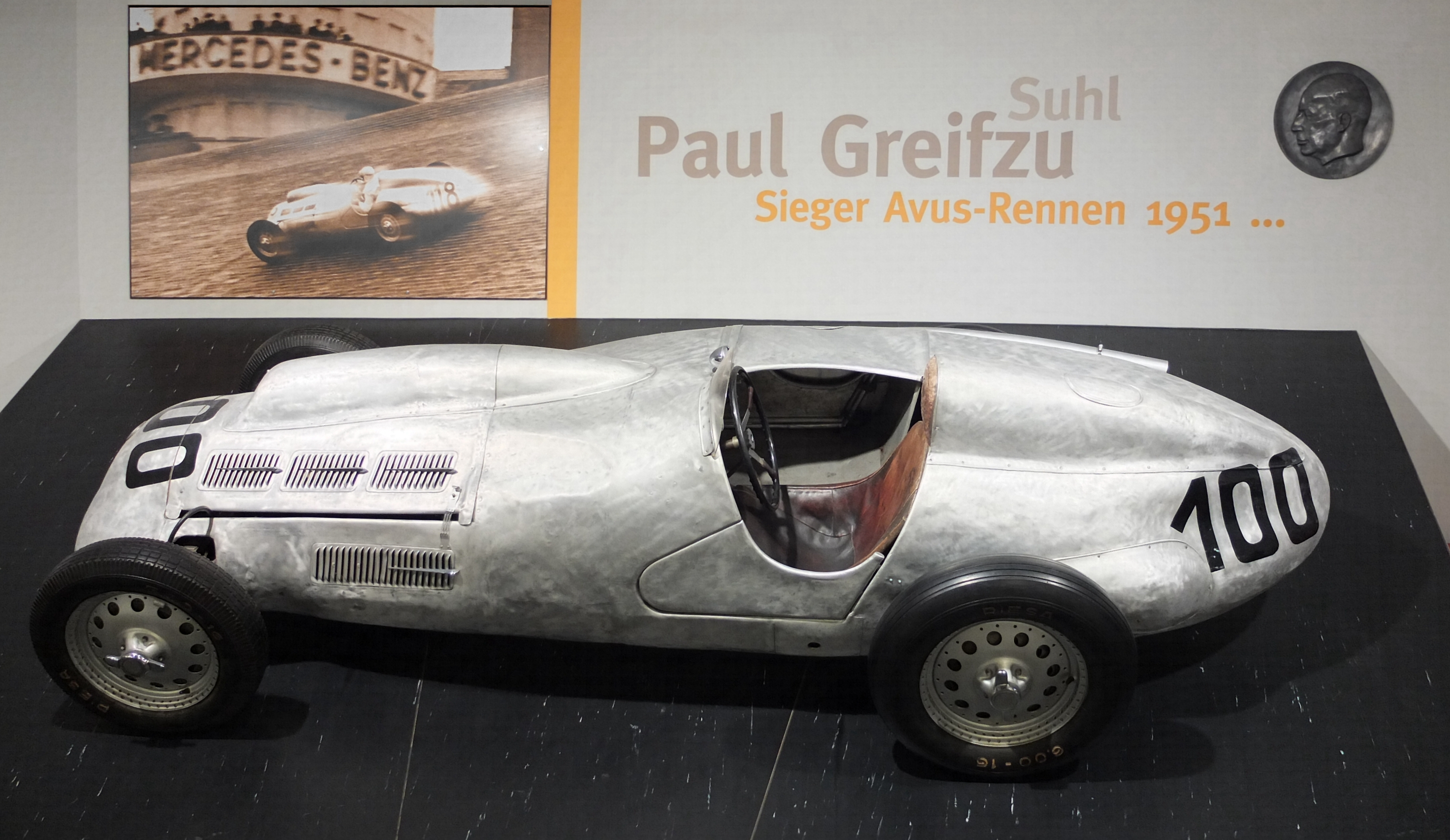
Paul Greifzu's Formula 2 BMW (1951)

Paul Greifzu (7 April 1902 in Suhl – 10 May 1952 in Dessau) was a German motorsport racer and constructor from Suhl. He was successful before and after World War II with motorcycles and sports cars. He also made Formula Two cars labeled under his own name.

After having won several races in 1951, Greifzu was killed in practice at Dessau for an event held on a stretch of Autobahn in East Germany.

Rudolf Krause drove one of Greifzu's BMW-powered Formula Two cars for the 1953 German Grand Prix, entered by Dora Greifzu. He finished in 14th place, two laps behind the winning car.
