= Adolfo Schwelm Cruz =

Argentine racing driver (1923–2012)

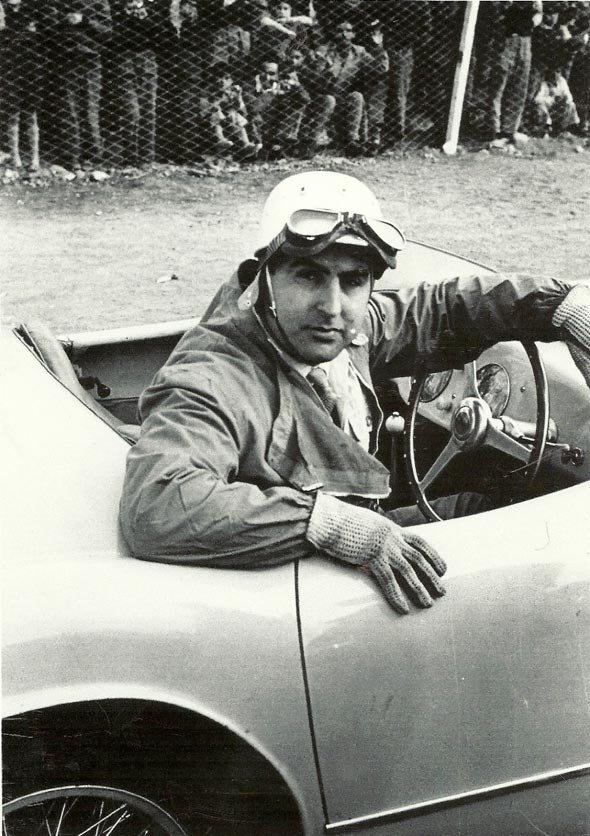
- Schwelm Cruz in 1952
- Born: Adolfo Carlos Julio Schwelm; 28 June 1923; Buenos Aires, Argentina
- Died: February 10, 2012 (aged 88); Buenos Aires, Argentina

Formula One World Championship career
- Nationality: (Argentina) Argentine
- Active years: 1953
- Team: Cooper
- Entries: 1
- Championships: 0
- Wins: 0
- Podiums: 0
- Career points: 0
- Pole positions: 0
- Fastest laps: 0
- First entry: 1953 Argentine Grand Prix

Adolfo Carlos Julio Schwelm Cruz (28 June 1923 – 10 February 2012) was a racing driver from Argentina. He participated in one Formula One World Championship Grand Prix, on 18 January 1953, scoring no championship points. His father, Adolfo Julius Schwelm, was a German-born banker who emigrated to Argentina and founded the settlement of Eldorado, Misiones.

== Complete Formula One World Championship results ==
(key)

Year	Entrant	Chassis	Engine	1	2	3	4	5	6	7	8	9	WDC	Points
1953	Cooper Car Company	Cooper T20	Bristol Straight-6	ARG; Ret	500	NED	BEL	FRA	GBR	GER	SUI	ITA	NC	0
