= John Barber (racing driver) =

British racing driver (1929–2015)

- Born: 22 July 1929; Little Marlow, Buckinghamshire, England
- Died: 4 February 2015 (aged 85); Palma de Mallorca, Mallorca, Spain

Formula One World Championship career
- Nationality: (United Kingdom) British
- Active years: 1953
- Team: Cooper
- Entries: 1
- Championships: 0
- Wins: 0
- Podiums: 0
- Career points: 0
- Pole positions: 0
- Fastest laps: 0
- First entry: 1953 Argentine Grand Prix

John David Barber (22 July 1929 – 4 February 2015) was a racing driver from England. Before his racing career he was a fish merchant in London.

He first raced a Cooper-JAP and then bought a Formula Two Cooper-Bristol Mk1 which he raced during 1952. Despite winning a minor race at Snetterton, he had little success and finally crashed the car badly towards the end of the season.

At the start of 1953, Barber travelled to Argentina to compete in the Formula One Grand Prix there with a works Cooper T23, in which he came in eighth, seven laps down. He also competed in a Formula Libre race in Buenos Aires and finished 12th.

Back in England, he raced a Golding-Cooper, which may have been built from the remains of his crashed Mk1 Cooper. While racing this car in the British Empire Trophy on the Isle of Man, he was involved in an accident which killed another driver, James Neilson. Barber sold the car soon after. He next raced in 1955, driving a Jaguar C-type.

After his motor racing career came to an end, Barber retired to live on a boat in the Mediterranean.

== Complete Formula One World Championship results ==
(key)

| Year | Entrant | Chassis | Engine | 1 | 2 | 3 | 4 | 5 | 6 | 7 | 8 | 9 | WDC | Points |
|---|---|---|---|---|---|---|---|---|---|---|---|---|---|---|
| 1953 | Cooper Car Company | Cooper T23 | Bristol Straight-6 | ARG; 8 | 500 | NED | BEL | FRA | GBR | GER | SUI | ITA | NC | 0 |
