= 1953 Argentine Grand Prix =

← Previous race	Next race →

Race details
- Date: 18 January 1953
- Official name: I Gran Premio de la Republica Argentina
- Location: Autódromo 17 de Octubre, Buenos Aires, Argentina
- Course: Permanent racing facility
- Course length: 3.912 km (2.431 miles)
- Distance: 97 laps, 379.464 km (235.788 miles)
- Weather: Hot, dry

Pole position
Driver	(Italy) Alberto Ascari	Ferrari
- Time: 1:55.4

Fastest lap
Driver	(Italy) Alberto Ascari	Ferrari
- Time: 1:48.4 on lap 73

Podium
First	(Italy) Alberto Ascari	Ferrari
Second	(Italy) Luigi Villoresi	Ferrari
Third	(Argentina) José Froilán González	Maserati

The 1953 Argentine Grand Prix was race 1 of 9 in the 1953 World Championship of Drivers, which was run to Formula Two regulations in 1952 and 1953. The race was held in Buenos Aires on 18 January 1953, at the Autódromo Gálvez (official name: Autódromo Juan y Óscar Gálvez, also known as the Autódromo 17 de Octubre) and was the first World Drivers' Championship race in South America.

== Race report ==
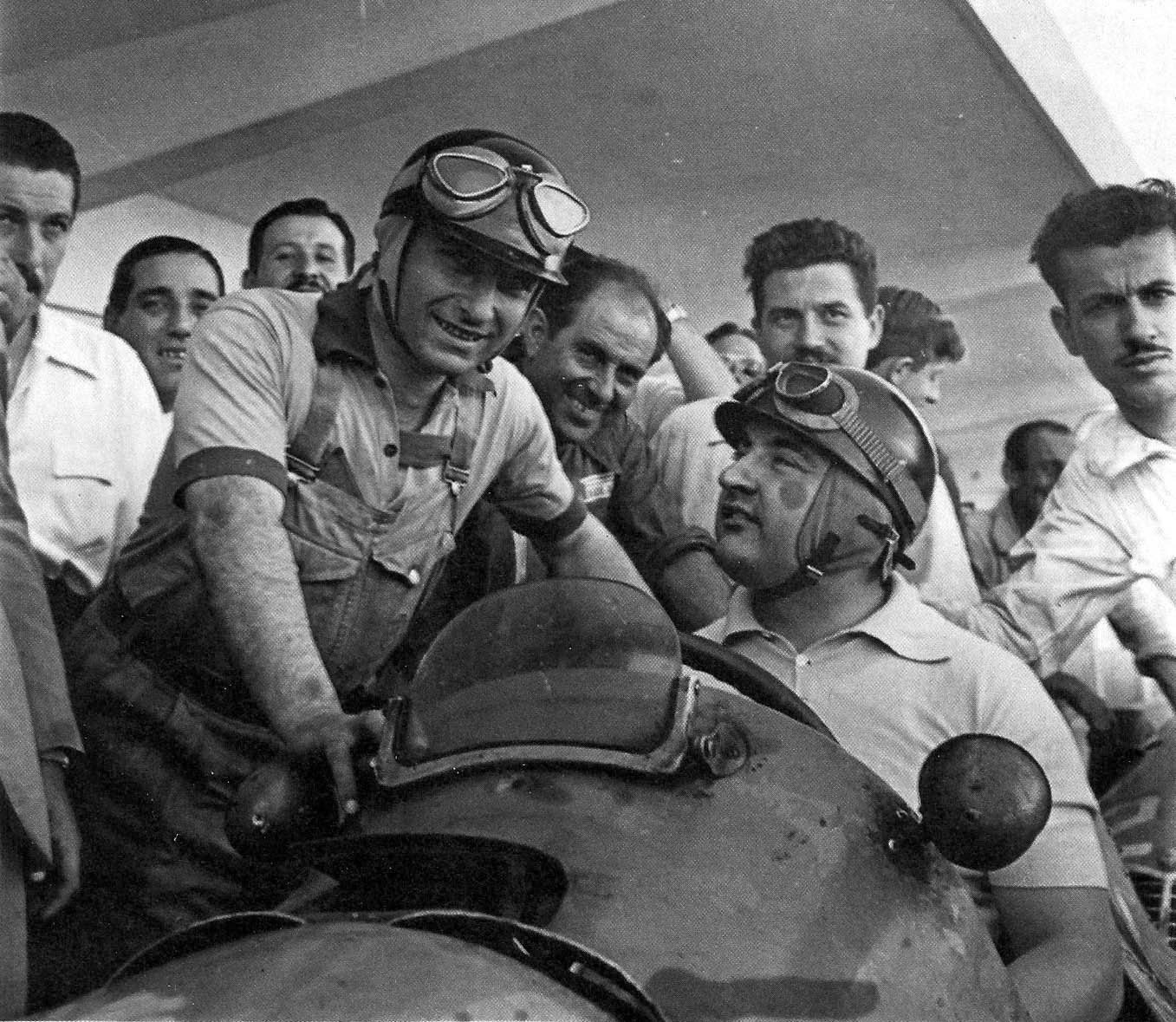
Local drivers Juan Manuel Fangio and José Froilán González during a test prior to the race

The inaugural Argentine Grand Prix, held in mid-January, was attended by four of the major works teams: Maserati, Ferrari, Cooper, and Gordini. Former World Champion Juan Manuel Fangio, who had not competed in the Championship since clinching the 1951 title in Spain, raced for Maserati alongside fellow Argentines José Froilán González and Oscar Alfredo Gálvez, and Italian driver Felice Bonetto. Ferrari lined up with the familiar trio of reigning World Champion Alberto Ascari, Nino Farina, and Luigi Villoresi, as well as their new signing Mike Hawthorn, who had driven a privateer Cooper the previous year. The Cooper team entered the British pair of Alan Brown and John Barber alongside the local driver Adolfo Schwelm Cruz. Gordini retained their 1952 trio of Robert Manzon, Maurice Trintignant, and Jean Behra, who were joined by a pair of Argentines—Carlos Menditeguy and Pablo Birger—the latter of which drove a Simca-Gordini.

Ascari was once again the fastest qualifier, taking his fourth consecutive World Championship pole position. His teammates Villoresi and Farina lined up third and fourth, but the returning Fangio prevented a Ferrari front row lockout by qualifying second in his Maserati. González, in the second Maserati, started from row two alongside Hawthorn, making his first appearance for Ferrari, and the Gordini of Trintignant. The remaining Gordinis of Manzon, Menditeguy, and Behra made up the third row with Gálvez in his Maserati. Row four consisted of the Coopers of Brown and Schwelm Cruz, and Birger in the sole Simca-Gordini. At the back of the grid were the Maserati of Bonetto and Barber in the final Cooper.

Due to President Juan Perón's decision to allow free access to the circuit, there were an excessive number of spectators and they lined the track as the race began. One of the spectators wandered onto the track, and, in order to avoid hitting him, Nino Farina was forced to swerve. Farina ultimately lost control of his car and crashed into the crowd on lap 31, killing 13 spectators. In the resulting mass panic, a boy ran in front of Brown's Cooper and was killed. Despite the fatalities at trackside, the race continued uninterrupted to its full race distance.

Ascari, who started from pole, led the entirety of the race, taking his seventh consecutive World Championship race victory, and, in so doing, established an early lead in the Drivers' Championship. Fangio was in second until a transmission issue forced him to retire from the race. Manzon initially inherited the position, but Villoresi ultimately took second place, a lap behind his teammate. Hawthorn had been running in third, although he was eventually overtaken by González, preventing a Ferrari 1-2-3. Hawthorn finished fourth, ahead of Gálvez, who took the final points in his first and only World Championship race.

== Entries ==
No	Driver	Entrant	Constructor	Chassis	Engine	Tyre
2	(Argentina) Juan Manuel Fangio	Officine Alfieri Maserati	Maserati	Maserati A6GCM-53	Maserati A6G 2.0 L6	P
4	(Argentina) José Froilán González	Officine Alfieri Maserati	Maserati	Maserati A6GCM-53	Maserati A6G 2.0 L6	P
6	(Italy) Felice Bonetto	Officine Alfieri Maserati	Maserati	Maserati A6GCM-53	Maserati A6G 2.0 L6	P
8	(Argentina) Oscar Alfredo Gálvez	Officine Alfieri Maserati	Maserati	Maserati A6GCM-53	Maserati A6G 2.0 L6	P
10	(Italy) Alberto Ascari	Scuderia Ferrari	Ferrari	Ferrari 500	Ferrari Type 500 2.0 L4	P
12	(Italy) Nino Farina	Scuderia Ferrari	Ferrari	Ferrari 500	Ferrari Type 500 2.0 L4	P
14	(Italy) Luigi Villoresi	Scuderia Ferrari	Ferrari	Ferrari 500	Ferrari Type 500 2.0 L4	P
16	(United Kingdom) Mike Hawthorn	Scuderia Ferrari	Ferrari	Ferrari 500	Ferrari Type 500 2.0 L4	P
20	(United Kingdom) Alan Brown	Cooper Car Co.	Cooper-Bristol	Cooper T20	Bristol BS1 2.0 L6	D
22	(United Kingdom) John Barber	Cooper Car Co.	Cooper-Bristol	Cooper T23	Bristol BS1 2.0 L6	D
24	(Argentina) Adolfo Schwelm Cruz	Cooper Car Co.	Cooper-Bristol	Cooper T20	Bristol BS1 2.0 L6	D
26	(France) Robert Manzon	Equipe Gordini	Gordini	Gordini T16	Gordini 20 2.0 L6	E
28	(France) Maurice Trintignant^{1}	Equipe Gordini	Gordini	Gordini T16	Gordini 20 2.0 L6	E
30	(France) Jean Behra	Equipe Gordini	Gordini	Gordini T16	Gordini 20 2.0 L6	E
32	(Argentina) Carlos Menditeguy	Equipe Gordini	Gordini	Gordini T16	Gordini 20 2.0 L6	E
34	(Argentina) Pablo Birger	Equipe Gordini	Simca-Gordini	Simca-Gordini T15	Gordini 1500 1.5 L4	E

^1 — Maurice Trintignant qualified and drove 50 laps of the race in the #28 Gordini. Harry Schell took over the car for the remainder of the race.

== Classification ==
=== Qualifying ===
Pos	No	Driver	Constructor	Time	Gap
1	10	(Italy) Alberto Ascari	Ferrari	1:55.4	—
2	2	(Argentina) Juan Manuel Fangio	Maserati	1:56.1	+0.7
3	14	(Italy) Luigi Villoresi	Ferrari	1:56.5	+1.1
4	12	(Italy) Nino Farina	Ferrari	1:57.1	+1.7
5	4	(Argentina) José Froilán González	Maserati	1:58.5	+3.1
6	16	(United Kingdom) Mike Hawthorn	Ferrari	1:59.4	+4.0
7	28	(France) Maurice Trintignant	Gordini	2:00.4	+5.0
8	26	(France) Robert Manzon	Gordini	2:00.9	+5.5
9	8	(Argentina) Oscar Alfredo Gálvez	Maserati	2:01.3	+5.9
10	32	(Argentina) Carlos Menditeguy	Gordini	2:01.8	+6.4
11	30	(France) Jean Behra	Gordini	2:02.6	+7.2
12	20	(United Kingdom) Alan Brown	Cooper-Bristol	2:03.2	+7.8
13	24	(Argentina) Adolfo Schwelm Cruz	Cooper-Bristol	2:03.7	+8.3
14	34	(Argentina) Pablo Birger	Simca-Gordini-Gordini	2:03.8	+8.4
15	6	(Italy) Felice Bonetto	Maserati	2:04.2	+8.8
16	22	(United Kingdom) John Barber	Cooper-Bristol	2:06.8	+11.4

=== Race ===
Pos	No	Driver	Constructor	Laps	Time/Retired	Grid	Points
1	10	(Italy) Alberto Ascari	Ferrari	97	3:01:04.6	1	9^{1}
2	14	(Italy) Luigi Villoresi	Ferrari	96	+1 lap	3	6
3	4	(Argentina) José Froilán González	Maserati	96	+1 lap	5	4
4	16	(United Kingdom) Mike Hawthorn	Ferrari	96	+1 lap	6	3
5	8	(Argentina) Oscar Alfredo Gálvez	Maserati	96	+1 lap	9	2
6	30	(France) Jean Behra	Gordini	94	+3 laps	11	
7	28	(France) Maurice Trintignant (United States) Harry Schell	Gordini	91	+6 laps	7	
8	22	(United Kingdom) John Barber	Cooper-Bristol	90	+7 laps	16	
9	20	(United Kingdom) Alan Brown	Cooper-Bristol	87	+10 laps	12	
Ret	26	(France) Robert Manzon	Gordini	67	Wheel	8	
Ret	2	(Argentina) Juan Manuel Fangio	Maserati	36	Transmission	2	
Ret	6	(Italy) Felice Bonetto	Maserati	32	Transmission	15	
Ret	12	(Italy) Nino Farina	Ferrari	31	Accident	4	
Ret	32	(Argentina) Carlos Menditeguy	Gordini	24	Gearbox	10	
Ret	34	(Argentina) Pablo Birger	Simca-Gordini-Gordini	21	Differential	14	
Ret	24	(Argentina) Adolfo Schwelm Cruz	Cooper-Bristol	20	Wheel	13	

Notes

- ^1 – Includes 1 point for fastest lap

== Shared drives ==
- Car #28: Maurice Trintignant (50 laps) and Harry Schell (41 laps).

== Championship standings after the race ==
Drivers' Championship standings

Pos	Driver	Points
1	(Italy) Alberto Ascari	9
2	(Italy) Luigi Villoresi	6
3	(Argentina) José Froilán González	4
4	(United Kingdom) Mike Hawthorn	3
5	(Argentina) Óscar Alfredo Gálvez	2

- Note: Only the top five positions are included. Only the best 4 results counted towards the Championship.

Previous race: 1952 Italian Grand Prix	FIA Formula One World Championship; 1953 season	Next race: 1953 Indianapolis 500
Previous race: N/A	Argentine Grand Prix	Next race: 1954 Argentine Grand Prix
