= André Simon (racing driver) =

French racing driver (1920–2012)

- Born: 5 January 1920; Paris, France
- Died: 11 July 2012 (aged 92); Évian-les-Bains, Haute Savoie, France

Formula One World Championship career
- Nationality: (France) French
- Active years: 1951–1952, 1955–1957
- Team(s): Gordini, Ferrari, Mercedes-Benz, Maserati (Incl non-works)
- Entries: 12 (11 starts)
- Championships: 0
- Wins: 0
- Podiums: 0
- Career points: 0
- Pole positions: 0
- Fastest laps: 0
- First entry: 1951 French Grand Prix
- Last entry: 1957 Italian Grand Prix

André Constant Simon (5 January 1920 – 11 July 2012) was a racing driver from France. He participated in Formula One from 1951 to 1957, competing in a total of 12 World Championship races but scoring no championship points.

Simon had not raced in F1 after 1952, and his 1954 Le Mans ended in DNF. Mercedes was in need of more drivers with international experience as along with the 1955 Formula One season, they now also entered the 1955 World Sportscar Championship, were usually two drivers per car were needed, thus at least six for a three car effort. With his Le Mans experience since 1949, finishing fifth in the 1952 24 Hours of Le Mans which was won by Mercedes, Simon was hired to mainly help driving the sportscars. Mercedes was a four car team in the two Argentinian Formula races in January 1955 and at the 1955 Mille Miglia in May, where Karl Kling got injured. When the German had to skip the 1955 Monaco Grand Prix, Mercedes was down to three, and only to two when Hans Herrmann got injured in practice and was out for the season. Simon was quickly at hand and got the drive in the No. 4 Mercedes entered for Herrmann. He was teamed up with Kling for Le Mans, they ran in third when Mercedes retired in the night after the 1955 Le Mans disaster in which the Mercedes of Levegh crashed.

== Complete Formula One World Championship results ==
(key)

Year	Entrant	Chassis	Engine	1	2	3	4	5	6	7	8	WDC	Points
1951	Equipe Gordini	Gordini Type 15	Gordini Straight-4	SUI; DNA	500	BEL	FRA; Ret	GBR	GER; Ret	ITA; 6	ESP; Ret	NC	0
1952	Scuderia Ferrari	Ferrari 500	Ferrari Straight-4	SUI; Ret *	500	BEL	FRA	GBR	GER	NED	ITA; 6	NC	0
1955	Daimler Benz AG	Mercedes-Benz W196	Mercedes-Benz Straight-8	ARG	MON; Ret	500	BEL	NED				NC	0
1955	Officine Alfieri Maserati	Maserati 250F	Maserati Straight-6						GBR; Ret	ITA		NC	0
1956	André Simon	Maserati 250F	Maserati Straight-6	ARG	MON	500	BEL	FRA; Ret	GBR	GER		NC	0
1956	Equipe Gordini	Gordini Type 16	Gordini Straight-6								ITA; 9	NC	0
1957	Scuderia Centro Sud	Maserati 250F	Maserati Straight-6	ARG	MON; DNQ	500	FRA	GBR	GER	PES		NC	0
1957	Ottorino Volonterio	Maserati 250F	Maserati Straight-6								ITA; 11 †	NC	0

* Indicates shared drive with Giuseppe Farina
† Indicates shared drive with Ottorino Volonterio
