= Robert Manzon =

French racing driver (1917–2015)

- Born: Robert Jean Joseph Manzon; 12 April 1917; Marseille, Bouches-du-Rhône, France
- Died: 19 January 2015 (aged 97); Cassis, Bouches-du-Rhône, France

Formula One World Championship career
- Nationality: (France) French
- Active years: 1950–1956
- Team(s): Gordini, Rosier, Ferrari
- Entries: 29 (28 starts)
- Championships: 0
- Wins: 0
- Podiums: 2
- Career points: 16
- Pole positions: 0
- Fastest laps: 0
- First entry: 1950 Monaco Grand Prix
- Last entry: 1956 Italian Grand Prix

Robert Jean Joseph Manzon (12 April 1917 – 19 January 2015) was a French racing driver, who competed in Formula One from 1950 to 1956.

Manzon participated in 29 Grands Prix, debuting at the 1950 Monaco Grand Prix. He achieved two podiums, and scored a total of 16 championship points, driving for Gordini, Rosier, and Ferrari. At the time of his death, Manzon was the last surviving driver to have taken part in the first Formula One World Championship in 1950.

== Career ==
Robert Jean Joseph Manzon was born on 12 April 1917 in Marseille, France. Manzon began his career as a mechanic and after World War II he started racing, initially with a Cisitalia D46. Earning a contract with the Gordini team for 1948, Manzon won some minor races although his machinery was not always reliable.

Manzon continued with Gordini into the new Formula One era, scoring points at the 1950 French Grand Prix, and finishing sixth in the World Drivers' Championship in 1952, taking third place in the 1952 Belgian Grand Prix. He left Gordini in 1953 and joined Louis Rosier's team, which was campaigning Ferraris. He subsequently achieved his second podium at the 1954 French Grand Prix at the wheel of a Ferrari 625.

Manzon then returned to the Gordini team, but found little success in World Championship events. Outside the Championship, he won the 1956 Naples Grand Prix and a sports car race at Pescara.

After racing, Manzon later operated his own diesel equipment distribution business. Manzon died at his home in the south of France on 19 January 2015 aged 97. He was the last surviving entrant of the 1950 Formula One season.

== Complete Formula One World Championship results ==
(key)

Year	Entrant	Chassis	Engine	1	2	3	4	5	6	7	8	9	WDC	Points
1950	Equipe Simca Gordini	Simca Gordini Type 15	Gordini Straight-4	GBR	MON; Ret	500	SUI	BEL	FRA; 4	ITA; Ret			14th	3
1951	Equipe Simca Gordini	Simca Gordini Type 15	Gordini Straight-4	SUI	500	BEL	FRA; Ret	GBR	GER; 7	ITA; Ret	ESP; 9		NC	0
1952	Equipe Gordini	Gordini Type 16	Gordini Straight-6	SUI; Ret	500	BEL; 3	FRA; 4	GBR; Ret	GER; Ret	NED; 5	ITA; 14		6th	9
1953	Equipe Gordini	Gordini Type 16	Gordini Straight-6	ARG; Ret	500	NED	BEL	FRA	GBR	GER	SUI	ITA	NC	0
1954	Equipe Rosier	Ferrari 625	Ferrari Straight-4	ARG	500	BEL	FRA; 3	GBR; Ret	GER; 9		ITA; Ret	ESP; Ret	15th	4
1954	Scuderia Ferrari	Ferrari 553	Ferrari Straight-4							SUI; DNS			15th	4
1955	Equipe Gordini	Gordini Type 16	Gordini Straight-6	ARG	MON; Ret	500	BEL	NED; Ret	GBR; Ret	ITA			NC	0
1956	Equipe Gordini	Gordini Type 16	Gordini Straight-6	ARG; DNA	MON; Ret	500	BEL						NC	0
1956	Equipe Gordini	Gordini Type 32	Gordini Straight-8					FRA; 9	GBR; 9	GER; Ret	ITA; Ret		NC	0

== Sources ==
- Profile at www.grandprix.com
- "Robert Manzon's obituary". nbcsports.com. 19 January 2015. Archived from the original on 21 January 2015.
