= Georges Berger (racing driver) =

Belgian racing driver (1918–1967)

- Born: 14 September 1918; Molenbeek-Saint-Jean, Brussels, Belgium
- Died: 23 August 1967 (aged 48); Nürburgring, Germany

Formula One World Championship career
- Nationality: (Belgium) Belgian
- Active years: 1953–1954
- Team: non-works Gordini
- Entries: 2
- Championships: 0
- Wins: 0
- Podiums: 0
- Career points: 0
- Pole positions: 0
- Fastest laps: 0
- First entry: 1953 Belgian Grand Prix
- Last entry: 1954 French Grand Prix

Georges Berger (14 September 1918 – 23 August 1967) was a racing driver who raced a Gordini in his two World Championship Formula One Grands Prix.

Berger initially competed during the 1950s in a Formula 2 BMW-engined Jicey with which he finished third in the Grand Prix des Frontières at Chimay. In 1953 he raced for the Simca-Gordini team and finished fifth at the same track. He entered the same car (a 1.5-litre 4 cylinder Gordini type 15) in the Belgian Grand Prix but retired after only three laps with engine failure. The following year he raced a Gordini at Reims-Gueux but the engine died again on lap 10. After this, he faded from single-seater racing.

Later in his career, Berger shared the winning Ferrari at the 1960 Tour de France automobile. He was killed racing a Porsche 911 in the 1967 84-hour Marathon de la Route at Nürburgring.

== Complete Formula One results ==
(key)

Year	Entrant	Chassis	Engine	1	2	3	4	5	6	7	8	9	WDC	Points
1953	Georges Berger	Gordini Type 15	Gordini Straight-4	ARG	500	NED	BEL; Ret	FRA	GBR	GER	SUI	ITA	NC	0
1954	Georges Berger	Gordini Type 16	Gordini Straight-6	ARG	500	BEL	FRA; Ret	GBR	GER	SUI	ITA	ESP	NC	0
