= Mike Sparken =

French racing driver (1930–2012)

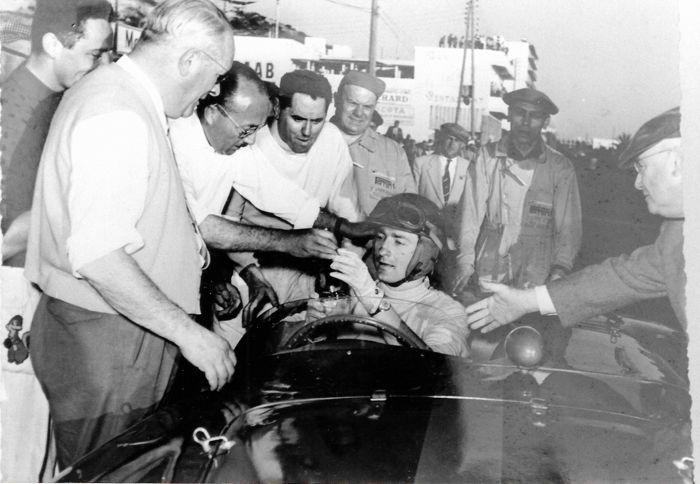
- Sparken wins at Agadir GP on 27 Feb 1955 in a rented Ferrari 750 Monza
- Born: 16 June 1930; Neuilly-sur-Seine, France
- Died: 21 September 2012 (aged 82); Beaulieu-sur-Mer, Alpes-Maritimes

Formula One World Championship career
- Nationality: (France) French
- Active years: 1955
- Team: Gordini
- Entries: 1
- Championships: 0
- Wins: 0
- Podiums: 0
- Career points: 0
- Pole positions: 0
- Fastest laps: 0
- First entry: 1955 British Grand Prix

Mike Sparken is a pseudonym for Michel Poberejsky (born 16 June 1930 in Neuilly-sur-Seine, Hauts-de-Seine; died 21 September 2012). He was a racing driver from France. He participated in one Formula One World Championship Grand Prix, at the 1955 British Grand Prix on 16 July. He finished seventh albeit nine laps down and scored no championship points.

Sparken was better known as a sportscar driver and much of his success came in events in North Africa.

== Complete Formula One World Championship results ==
(key)

Year	Entrant	Chassis	Engine	1	2	3	4	5	6	7	WDC	Points
1955	Équipe Gordini	Gordini Type 16	Gordini 2.5l Straight-6	ARG	MON	500	BEL	NED	GBR; 7	ITA	NC	0
