= 1955 British Grand Prix =

← Previous race	Next race →

Race details
- Date: 16 July 1955
- Official name: 8th RAC British Grand Prix
- Location: Aintree Circuit, Liverpool, England
- Course: Permanent racing facility
- Course length: 4.828 km (3.000 miles)
- Distance: 90 laps, 434.52 km (270.00 miles)
- Weather: Hot, dry.
- Attendance: 75,000-100,000

Pole position
Driver	(United Kingdom) Stirling Moss	Mercedes
- Time: 2:00.4

Fastest lap
Driver	(United Kingdom) Stirling Moss	Mercedes
- Time: 2:00.4

Podium
First	(United Kingdom) Stirling Moss	Mercedes
Second	(Argentina) Juan Manuel Fangio	Mercedes
Third	(Germany) Karl Kling	Mercedes

The 1955 British Grand Prix was a Formula One motor race held at Aintree on 16 July 1955. It was race 6 of 7 in the 1955 World Championship of Drivers. British driver Stirling Moss led a Mercedes 1–2–3–4 domination of the race, to achieve his first Formula One win, narrowly ahead of his illustrious Argentine teammate Juan Manuel Fangio. Several people, including Moss, believed that the Argentine allowed his British protégé to claim his debut win in front of his home crowd. This was, however, at Moss' inquiry, consistently denied by Fangio, who claimed that Moss "was simply faster that day."

In the wake of the Le Mans disaster, the French, German, Swiss and Spanish Grands Prix which were to take place at existing circuits had all been cancelled. The Aintree circuit was an all-new circuit around the Grand National horse racing course in Liverpool; it was built to be at the time one of the safest and most modern racing facilities in Europe.

With only one Championship round therefore remaining (the Italian Grand Prix some 2 months later), Fangio's points advantage over Moss was sufficient to secure his third World Drivers' Championship.

This was the last all-Mercedes-powered podium until the 2010 Chinese Grand Prix.

== Entries ==
Team	No	Driver	Car	Engine	Tyre
(Italy) Officine Alfieri Maserati	2	(France) Jean Behra	250F	Maserati 250F1 2.5 L6	P
(Italy) Officine Alfieri Maserati	4	(Italy) Luigi Musso	250F	Maserati 250F1 2.5 L6	P
(Italy) Officine Alfieri Maserati	6	(Argentina) Roberto Mieres	250F	Maserati 250F1 2.5 L6	P
(Italy) Officine Alfieri Maserati	8	(France) André Simon	250F	Maserati 250F1 2.5 L6	P
(Germany) Daimler Benz AG	10	(Argentina) Juan Manuel Fangio	W196	Mercedes M196 2.5 L8	C
(Germany) Daimler Benz AG	12	(United Kingdom) Stirling Moss	W196	Mercedes M196 2.5 L8	C
(Germany) Daimler Benz AG	14	(Germany) Karl Kling	W196	Mercedes M196 2.5 L8	C
(Germany) Daimler Benz AG	50	(Italy) Piero Taruffi	W196	Mercedes M196 2.5 L8	C
(Italy) Scuderia Ferrari	16	(United Kingdom) Mike Hawthorn	625	Ferrari 555 2.5 L4	E
(Italy) Scuderia Ferrari	18	(France) Maurice Trintignant	625	Ferrari 555 2.5 L4	E
(Italy) Scuderia Ferrari	20	(Italy) Eugenio Castellotti	625	Ferrari 555 2.5 L4	E
(France) Equipe Gordini	22	(France) Robert Manzon	T16	Gordini 23 2.5 L6	E
(France) Equipe Gordini	24	(Brazil) Hermano da Silva Ramos	T16	Gordini 23 2.5 L6	E
(France) Equipe Gordini	26	(France) Mike Sparken	T16	Gordini 23 2.5 L6	E
(United Kingdom) Vandervell Products	28	(United Kingdom) Ken Wharton	VW 55	Vanwall 254 2.5 L4	P
(United Kingdom) Vandervell Products	30	(United States) Harry Schell	VW 55	Vanwall 254 2.5 L4	P
(United Kingdom) Connaught Engineering	32	(United Kingdom) Kenneth McAlpine	B	Alta GP 2.5 L4	D
(United Kingdom) Connaught Engineering	34	(United Kingdom) Jack Fairman	B	Alta GP 2.5 L4	D
(United Kingdom) Rob Walker Racing Team	36	(United Kingdom) Tony Rolt	B	Alta GP 2.5 L4	D
(United Kingdom) Rob Walker Racing Team	36	(United Kingdom) Peter Walker	B	Alta GP 2.5 L4	D
(United Kingdom) Leslie Marr	38	(United Kingdom) Leslie Marr	B	Alta GP 2.5 L4	D
(United Kingdom) Cooper Car Company	40	(Australia) Jack Brabham	Cooper T40	Bristol BS1 2.0 L6	D
(United Kingdom) Owen Racing Organisation	42	(United Kingdom) Peter Collins	250F	Maserati 250F1 2.5 L6	D
(United Kingdom) Gilby Engineering	44	(United Kingdom) Roy Salvadori	250F	Maserati 250F1 2.5 L6	D
(United Kingdom) Stirling Moss Ltd	46	(United Kingdom) Lance Macklin	250F	Maserati 250F1 2.5 L6	D
(United Kingdom) Gould's Garage (Bristol)	48	(United Kingdom) Horace Gould	250F	Maserati 250F1 2.5 L6	D

== Classification ==
=== Qualifying ===
Pos	No	Driver	Constructor	Time	Gap
1	12	(United Kingdom) Stirling Moss	Mercedes	2:00.4	—
2	10	(Argentina) Juan Manuel Fangio	Mercedes	2:00.6	+0.2
3	2	(France) Jean Behra	Maserati	2:01.4	+1.0
4	14	(Germany) Karl Kling	Mercedes	2:02.0	+1.6
5	50	(Italy) Piero Taruffi	Mercedes	2:03.0	+2.6
6	6	(Argentina) Roberto Mieres	Maserati	2:03.2	+2.8
7	30	(United States) Harry Schell	Vanwall	2:03.8	+3.4
8	8	(France) André Simon	Maserati	2:04.0	+3.6
9	4	(Italy) Luigi Musso	Maserati	2:04.2	+3.8
10	20	(Italy) Eugenio Castellotti	Ferrari	2:05.0	+4.6
11	22	(France) Robert Manzon	Gordini	2:05.0	+4.6
12	16	(United Kingdom) Mike Hawthorn	Ferrari	2:05.4	+5.0
13	18	(France) Maurice Trintignant	Ferrari	2:05.4	+5.0
14	36	(United Kingdom) Tony Rolt	Connaught-Alta	2:06.6	+6.2
15	28	(United Kingdom) Ken Wharton	Vanwall	2:08.4	+8.0
16	46	(United Kingdom) Lance Macklin	Maserati	2:08.4	+8.0
17	32	(United Kingdom) Kenneth McAlpine	Connaught-Alta	2:09.6	+9.2
18	24	(Brazil) Hermano da Silva Ramos	Gordini	2:10.6	+10.2
19	38	(United Kingdom) Leslie Marr	Connaught-Alta	2:11.6	+11.2
20	44	(United Kingdom) Roy Salvadori	Maserati	2:11.6	+11.2
21	34	(United Kingdom) Jack Fairman	Connaught-Alta	2:11.6	+11.2
22	48	(United Kingdom) Horace Gould	Maserati	2:11.8	+11.4
23	26	(France) Mike Sparken	Gordini	2:12.6	+12.2
24	42	(United Kingdom) Peter Collins	Maserati	2:13.4	+13.0
25	40	(Australia) Jack Brabham	Cooper-Bristol	2:27.4	+27.0

=== Race ===
Pos	No	Driver	Constructor	Laps	Time/Retired	Grid	Points
1	12	(United Kingdom) Stirling Moss	Mercedes	90	3:07:21.2	1	9^{1}
2	10	(Argentina) Juan Manuel Fangio	Mercedes	90	+0.2	2	6
3	14	(Germany) Karl Kling	Mercedes	90	+1:11.8	4	4
4	50	(Italy) Piero Taruffi	Mercedes	89	+1 Lap	5	3
5	4	(Italy) Luigi Musso	Maserati	89	+1 Lap	9	2
6	16	(United Kingdom) Mike Hawthorn (Italy) Eugenio Castellotti	Ferrari	87	+3 Laps	12	
7	26	(France) Mike Sparken	Gordini	81	+9 Laps	23	
8	46	(United Kingdom) Lance Macklin	Maserati	79	+11 Laps	16	
9	28	(United Kingdom) Ken Wharton (United States) Harry Schell	Vanwall	72	+18 Laps	15	
Ret	18	(France) Maurice Trintignant	Ferrari	59	Overheating	13	
Ret	6	(Argentina) Roberto Mieres	Maserati	47	Engine	6	
Ret	40	(Australia) Jack Brabham	Cooper-Bristol	30	Engine	25	
Ret	32	(United Kingdom) Kenneth McAlpine	Connaught-Alta	30	Oil Pressure	17	
Ret	42	(United Kingdom) Peter Collins	Maserati	28	Clutch	24	
Ret	24	(Brazil) Hermano da Silva Ramos	Gordini	26	Oil Pressure	18	
Ret	44	(United Kingdom) Roy Salvadori	Maserati	23	Gearbox	20	
Ret	48	(United Kingdom) Horace Gould	Maserati	22	Brakes	22	
Ret	30	(United States) Harry Schell	Vanwall	20	Throttle	7	
Ret	36	(United Kingdom) Tony Rolt (United Kingdom) Peter Walker	Connaught-Alta	19	Transmission	14	
Ret	38	(United Kingdom) Leslie Marr	Connaught-Alta	18	Brakes	19	
Ret	20	(Italy) Eugenio Castellotti	Ferrari	16	Transmission	10	
Ret	8	(France) André Simon	Maserati	9	Gearbox	8	
Ret	2	(France) Jean Behra	Maserati	9	Oil Leak	3	
Ret	22	(France) Robert Manzon	Gordini	4	Transmission	11	
DNS	34	(United Kingdom) Jack Fairman	Connaught-Alta		Engine	21	

Notes

- ^1 – Includes 1 point for fastest lap

== Shared drives ==
- Car #16: Mike Hawthorn (60 laps) and Eugenio Castellotti (27 laps).
- Car #28: Ken Wharton (50 laps) and Harry Schell (22 laps).
- Car #36: Tony Rolt (10 laps) and Peter Walker (9 laps).

== Notes ==
- This was the Formula One debut of future triple world champion Jack Brabham.
- This was only the second time a Ferrari (powered-car) did not finish in a points position (be it through the classification or a fastest lap). It ended a 37-race streak since the 1950 Belgian Grand Prix of a Ferrari ending a race with at least one point.

== Championship standings after the race ==
- **Bold text** indicates the World Champion.

Drivers' Championship standings

Pos	Driver	Points
1	(Argentina) **Juan Manuel Fangio**	33
2	(United Kingdom) Stirling Moss	22
3	(France) Maurice Trintignant	11 1/3
4	(Italy) Nino Farina	10 1/3
5	(United States) Bob Sweikert	8

- Note: Only the top five positions are included.

Previous race: 1955 Dutch Grand Prix	FIA Formula One World Championship; 1955 season	Next race: 1955 Italian Grand Prix
Previous race: 1954 British Grand Prix	British Grand Prix	Next race: 1956 British Grand Prix
