= Hermano da Silva Ramos =

French-Brazilian racing driver (1925–2026)

- Born: 7 December 1925; Paris, France
- Died: 4 May 2026 (aged 100); Biarritz, France

Formula One World Championship career
- Nationality: (Brazil) Brazilian
- Active years: 1955–1956
- Team: Gordini
- Entries: 7
- Championships: 0
- Wins: 0
- Podiums: 0
- Career points: 2
- Pole positions: 0
- Fastest laps: 0
- First entry: 1955 Dutch Grand Prix
- Last entry: 1956 Italian Grand Prix

Hermano (Note: Sources disagree regarding da Silva Ramos's first name. Some sources (e.g. FORIX, oldracingcars.com, formula1.com, ChicaneF1 and StatsF1) list it as "Hermano" whereas others (e.g. grandprix.com and Mike Lang's Grand Prix! Volume 1) list it as "Hernando".) João "Nano" da Silva Ramos (7 December 1925 – 4 May 2026) was a French-Brazilian racing driver. He had a French mother and a Brazilian father. He was the oldest living Formula One driver from April 2023 until his death.

== Biography ==
Da Silva Ramos was born in Paris, France on 7 December 1925. He first ventured into motor racing, driving an MG TC, in March 1947, when at the age of 21, he competed in the Interlagos Grand Prix in Brazil. During 1953, he began racing an Aston Martin DB2/4 in sports car races in France. In 1954 at Montlhéry, he crossed the line in second place in the Paris Cup but was winner of the Coupe de Montlhéry. In the same year, he also participated in the Le Mans 24 hour race, with Jean-Paul Colas as his co-driver, being forced to retire after 14 hours following a rear axle failure. Also in 1954, he ran out of fuel whilst leading the Tour de France Auto and retired with a damaged engine in the Rally of Morocco. Later in the year in the Salon Cup, in which he also had to retire, he drove a Gordini Type 18. In 1955, he (with co-driver Lucas) were disqualified for speeding in the Monte Carlo Rally, eventually classified 46th and fourth in class, won the Coupe de Montlhéry again, won the Rally Sable-Solesmes, and was fifth in the GT class of the Mille Miglia with co-driver Vidille.

He participated in seven Formula One World Championship Grands Prix, debuting on 19 June 1955 and scored a total of two championship points.

On the death of Kenneth McAlpine on 8 April 2023, da Silva Ramos became the oldest living former driver to have driven in a Formula One Grand Prix and on the death of Paul Goldsmith on 6 September 2024, he became the oldest living former driver to have driven in a round of the Formula One World Championship since Goldsmith competed in the 1958, 1959, and 1960 Indianapolis 500 races, which were rounds of the Formula One World Championship, but were not Formula One Grand Prixs. On the death of Hans Herrmann in 2026, he became the last living F1 World Championship points scorer in the 1950s. Da Silva Ramos was the last living participant of the 1955 24 Hours of Le Mans. In 2022 he participated as an expert in Emmanuel Reyé's documentary movie Le Mans 55 : Une tragédie française.

Da Silva Ramos died in Biarritz, France on 4 May 2026, at the age of 100.

== Complete Formula One World Championship results ==
(key)

Year	Entrant	Chassis	Engine	1	2	3	4	5	6	7	8	WDC	Points
1955	Équipe Gordini	Gordini Type 16	Gordini Straight-6	ARG	MON	500	BEL	NED; 8	GBR; Ret	ITA; Ret		NC	0
1956	Équipe Gordini	Gordini Type 16	Gordini Straight-6	ARG	MON; 5	500	BEL					19th	2
1956	Équipe Gordini	Gordini Type 32	Gordini Straight-8					FRA; 8	GBR; Ret	GER	ITA; Ret	19th	2
