= 1954 French Grand Prix =

← Previous race	Next race →
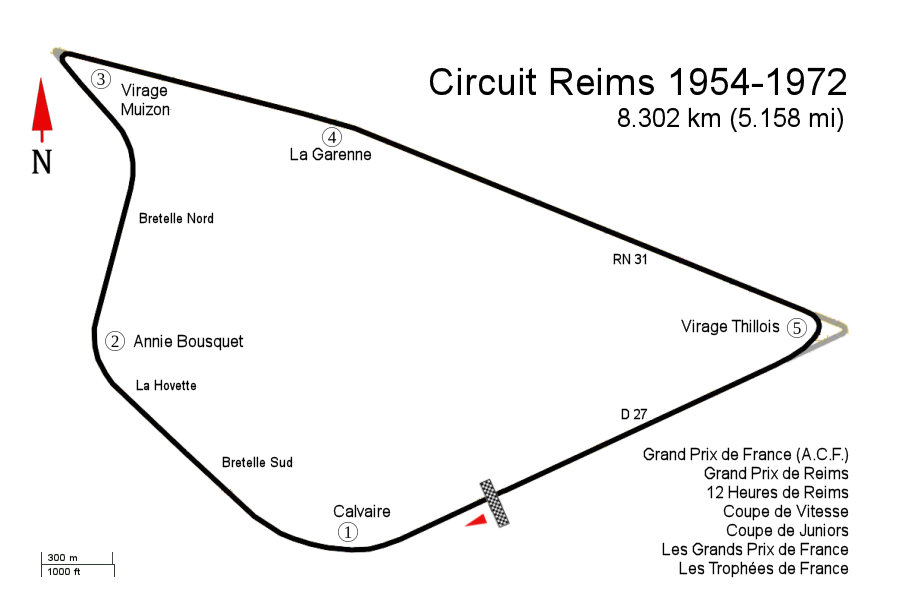
- Reims-Gueux layout

Race details
- Date: 4 July 1954
- Official name: XLI Grand Prix de l'ACF
- Location: Reims Circuit, Reims, France
- Course: Temporary road course
- Course length: 8.302 km (5.159 miles)
- Distance: 61 laps, 506.422 km (314.676 miles)
- Weather: Overcast, wet

Pole position
Driver	(Argentina) Juan Manuel Fangio	Mercedes
- Time: 2:29.4

Fastest lap
Driver	(Germany) Hans Herrmann	Mercedes
- Time: 2:32.9 on lap 3

Podium
First	(Argentina) Juan Manuel Fangio	Mercedes
Second	(Germany) Karl Kling	Mercedes
Third	(France) Robert Manzon	Ferrari

The 1954 French Grand Prix was a Formula One motor race held at Reims on 4 July 1954. It was race 4 of 9 in the 1954 World Championship of Drivers. The 61-lap race was won by Mercedes driver Juan Manuel Fangio after he started from pole position. His teammate Karl Kling finished second and Ferrari driver Robert Manzon came in third.

== Race report ==
The long-awaited Mercedes W196 with its straight-8 fuel-injection engine made its debut with Juan Manuel Fangio transferring from Maserati to join an otherwise all-German line-up of Hans Herrmann, Karl Kling and pre-war driver Hermann Lang. It was a dominant return with Fangio recording a practice lap of 124.31 mph. He and Kling led away and continued to race side by side around the Reims track. The Ferrari drivers simply couldn't cope with the pace. José Froilán González retired after 12 laps and Mike Hawthorn's car blew up spectacularly. Former Ferrari double World Champion (1952 and 1953) Alberto Ascari drove a Maserati, as the Lancia D50 was not yet ready for racing, and lasted only 1 lap after starting on the outside of the front row. Herrmann set fastest lap before retiring, but Fangio and Kling continued their duel until the last lap when team orders were put in force and Fangio led Kling over the line by a mere 0.1 seconds-half a car length. Only six cars finished the gruelling race.

== Entries ==
Team	No	Driver	Car	Engine	Tyre
(Italy) Scuderia Ferrari	2	(Argentina) José Froilán González	Ferrari 553	Ferrari 554 2.5 L4	P
(Italy) Scuderia Ferrari	4	(France) Maurice Trintignant	Ferrari 625 F1	Ferrari 625 2.5 L4	P
(Italy) Scuderia Ferrari	6	(United Kingdom) Mike Hawthorn	Ferrari 553	Ferrari 554 2.5 L4	P
(Italy) Officine Alfieri Maserati	10	(Italy) Alberto Ascari	Maserati 250F	Maserati 250F1 2.5 L6	P
(Italy) Officine Alfieri Maserati	12	(Argentina) Onofre Marimón	Maserati 250F	Maserati 250F1 2.5 L6	P
(Italy) Officine Alfieri Maserati	14	(Italy) Luigi Villoresi	Maserati 250F	Maserati 250F1 2.5 L6	P
(Italy) Officine Alfieri Maserati	40	(Italy) Sergio Mantovani	Maserati 250F	Maserati 250F1 2.5 L6	P
(Argentina) Roberto Mieres	16	(Argentina) Roberto Mieres	Maserati A6GCM	Maserati A6 2.0 L6	P
(Germany) Daimler Benz AG	18	(Argentina) Juan Manuel Fangio	Mercedes-Benz W196	Mercedes M196 2.5 L8	C
(Germany) Daimler Benz AG	20	(Germany) Karl Kling	Mercedes-Benz W196	Mercedes M196 2.5 L8	C
(Germany) Daimler Benz AG	22	(West Germany) Hans Herrmann	Mercedes-Benz W196	Mercedes M196 2.5 L8	C
(France) Equipe Gordini	24	(France) Jean Behra	Gordini T16	Gordini 23 2.5 L6	E
(France) Equipe Gordini	26	(France) Jacques Pollet	Gordini T16	Gordini 23 2.5 L6	E
(France) Equipe Gordini	28	(Belgium) Paul Frère	Gordini T16	Gordini 23 2.5 L6	E
(Belgium) Georges Berger	30	(Belgium) Georges Berger	Gordini T16	Gordini 23 2.5 L6	E
(United Kingdom) HW Motors	32	(United Kingdom) Lance Macklin	HWM 53	Alta GP 2.5 L4	D
(France) Ecurie Rosier	34	(France) Robert Manzon	Ferrari 625 F1	Ferrari 625 2.5 L4	D P
(France) Ecurie Rosier	36	(France) Louis Rosier	Ferrari 625 F1	Ferrari 625 2.5 L4	D P
(United Kingdom) Owen Racing Organisation	42	(United Kingdom) Ken Wharton	Ferrari 625 F1	Ferrari 625 2.5 L4	D
(United Kingdom) Gilby Engineering	44	(United Kingdom) Roy Salvadori	Maserati 250F	Maserati 250F1 2.5 L6	D
(Thailand) Birabongse Bhanudej	46	(Thailand) Prince Bira	Maserati 250F	Maserati 250F1 2.5 L6	P
(United States) Harry Schell	48	(United States) Harry Schell	Maserati A6GCM	Maserati A6 2.0 L6	P

== Classification ==
=== Qualifying ===
Pos	No	Driver	Constructor	Time	Gap
1	18	(Argentina) Juan Manuel Fangio	Mercedes	2:29.4	—
2	20	(Germany) Karl Kling	Mercedes	2:30.4	+ 1.0
3	10	(Italy) Alberto Ascari	Maserati	2:30.5	+ 1.1
4	2	(Argentina) José Froilán González	Ferrari	2:30.6	+ 1.2
5	12	(Argentina) Onofre Marimón	Maserati	2:31.6	+ 2.2
6	46	(Thailand) Prince Bira	Maserati	2:35.1	+ 5.7
7	22	(West Germany) Hans Herrmann	Mercedes	2:35.3	+ 5.9
8	6	(United Kingdom) Mike Hawthorn	Ferrari	2:35.6	+ 6.2
9	4	(France) Maurice Trintignant	Ferrari	2:36.1	+ 6.7
10	44	(United Kingdom) Roy Salvadori	Maserati	2:36.3	+ 6.9
11	16	(Argentina) Roberto Mieres	Maserati	2:38.7	+ 9.3
12	34	(France) Robert Manzon	Ferrari	2:42.0	+ 12.6
13	36	(France) Louis Rosier	Ferrari	2:42.1	+ 12.7
14	14	(Italy) Luigi Villoresi	Maserati	2:42.7	+ 13.3
15	32	(United Kingdom) Lance Macklin	HWM-Alta	2:52.5	+ 23.1
16	42	(United Kingdom) Ken Wharton	Maserati	3:09.3	+ 39.9
17	24	(France) Jean Behra	Gordini	No time	—
18	26	(France) Jacques Pollet	Gordini	No time	—
19	28	(Belgium) Paul Frère	Gordini	No time	—
20	30	(Belgium) Georges Berger	Gordini	No time	—
21	48	(United States) Harry Schell	Maserati	No time	—
DNA	40	(Italy) Sergio Mantovani	Maserati	No time	—

=== Race ===
Pos	No	Driver	Constructor	Laps	Time/Retired	Grid	Points
1	18	(Argentina) Juan Manuel Fangio	Mercedes	61	2:42:47.9	1	8
2	20	(Germany) Karl Kling	Mercedes	61	+ 0.1	2	6
3	34	(France) Robert Manzon	Ferrari	60	+ 1 Lap	12	4
4	46	(Thailand) Prince Bira	Maserati	60	+ 1 Lap	6	3
5	14	(Italy) Luigi Villoresi	Maserati	58	+ 3 Laps	14	2
6	24	(France) Jean Behra	Gordini	56	+ 5 Laps	17	
Ret	28	(Belgium) Paul Frère	Gordini	50	Axle	19	
Ret	4	(France) Maurice Trintignant	Ferrari	36	Engine	9	
Ret	36	(France) Louis Rosier	Ferrari	27	Engine	13	
Ret	12	(Argentina) Onofre Marimón	Maserati	27	Gearbox	5	
Ret	16	(Argentina) Roberto Mieres	Maserati	24	Engine	11	
Ret	42	(United Kingdom) Ken Wharton	Maserati	19	Transmission	16	
Ret	48	(United States) Harry Schell	Maserati	19	Fuel Pump	21	
Ret	22	(Germany) Hans Herrmann	Mercedes	16	Engine	7	1^{1}
Ret	44	(United Kingdom) Roy Salvadori	Maserati	15	Half Shaft	10	
Ret	2	(Argentina) José Froilán González	Ferrari	13	Engine	4	
Ret	32	(United Kingdom) Lance Macklin	HWM-Alta	10	Engine	15	
Ret	30	(Belgium) Georges Berger	Gordini	9	Engine	20	
Ret	6	(United Kingdom) Mike Hawthorn	Ferrari	9	Engine	8	
Ret	26	(France) Jacques Pollet	Gordini	8	Engine	18	
Ret	10	(Italy) Alberto Ascari	Maserati	1	Transmission	3	

Notes

- ^1 – 1 point for fastest lap

== Championship standings after the race ==
Drivers' Championship standings

Pos	Driver	Points
1	(Argentina) Juan Manuel Fangio	25
2	(France) Maurice Trintignant	9
3	(United States) Bill Vukovich	8
4	(Argentina) José Froilán González	6.5
5	(Italy) Nino Farina	6

- Note: Only the top five positions are included. Only the best 5 results counted towards the Championship.

Previous race: 1954 Belgian Grand Prix	FIA Formula One World Championship; 1954 season	Next race: 1954 British Grand Prix
Previous race: 1953 French Grand Prix	French Grand Prix	Next race: 1956 French Grand Prix
