= 1956 Italian Grand Prix =

← Previous race	Next race →
- Autodromo Nazionale di Monza layout

Race details
- Date: 2 September 1956
- Official name: XXVII Gran Premio d'Italia
- Location: Autodromo Nazionale di Monza, Monza, Italy
- Course: Permanent road course
- Course length: 10.000 km (6.214 miles)
- Distance: 50 laps, 500.023 km (310.700 miles)
- Weather: Cloudy, warm, alternating light rain

Pole position
Driver	(Argentina) Juan Manuel Fangio	Ferrari
- Time: 2:42:6

Fastest lap
Driver	(United Kingdom) Stirling Moss	Maserati
- Time: 2:45.5

Podium
First	(United Kingdom) Stirling Moss	Maserati
Second	(United Kingdom) Peter Collins; (Argentina) Juan Manuel Fangio	Ferrari
Third	(United Kingdom) Ron Flockhart	Connaught-Alta

The 1956 Italian Grand Prix was a Formula One motor race held on 2 September 1956 at Monza. It was the eighth and final race of the 1956 World Championship of Drivers. Coming into the race, Juan Manuel Fangio had an eight-point lead over Ferrari teammate Peter Collins and Jean Behra, driving for Maserati.

Fangio retired with a broken steering arm, while Behra also had to pull out. Luigi Musso, also driving for Ferrari, was told to hand his car over to Fangio to ensure the Argentine's third consecutive title but he refused. Brit Collins, with the opportunity for his first world championship, sportingly handed his car over to Fangio during a routine pit-stop. Fangio finished second, behind Stirling Moss, giving himself and Collins a share of the points for second place and ensuring his fourth title.

The race saw the World Championship debuts of Jo Bonnier (the first Swede to do so), Les Leston, and Wolfgang von Trips, and the final World Championship appearances for Hermano da Silva Ramos, Toulo de Graffenried, Robert Manzon, Piero Taruffi, and Luigi Villoresi. Ron Flockhart scored his first World Championship points and podium finish, and it was the first World Championship race led by Musso. With Collins having a share of second place, this was the first World Championship Grand Prix in which British drivers finished one-two-three.

== Classification ==
=== Qualifying ===
Pos	No	Driver	Constructor	Time	Gap
1	22	(Argentina) Juan Manuel Fangio	Ferrari	2:42.6	—
2	24	(Italy) Eugenio Castellotti	Ferrari	2:43.4	+0.8
3	28	(Italy) Luigi Musso	Ferrari	2:43.7	+1.1
4	16	(Italy) Piero Taruffi	Vanwall	2:45.4	+2.8
5	32	(France) Jean Behra	Maserati	2:45.6	+3.0
6	36	(United Kingdom) Stirling Moss	Maserati	2:45.9	+3.3
7	26	(United Kingdom) Peter Collins	Ferrari	2:46.0	+3.4
8	34	(Italy) Luigi Villoresi	Maserati	2:47.7	+5.1
9	30	(Spain) Alfonso de Portago	Ferrari	2:47.8	+5.2
10	18	(United States) Harry Schell	Vanwall	2:50.1	+7.5
11	20	(France) Maurice Trintignant	Vanwall	2:51.6	+9.0
12	46	(Italy) Umberto Maglioli	Maserati	2:52.7	+10.1
13	44	(United Kingdom) Roy Salvadori	Maserati	2:54.6	+12.0
14	40	(Italy) Luigi Piotti	Maserati	2:58.6	+16.0
15	6	(United Kingdom) Jack Fairman	Connaught-Alta	2:59.2	+16.6
16	42	(Italy) Gerino Gerini	Maserati	3:02.6	+20.0
17	38	(Spain) Paco Godia	Maserati	3:02.9	+20.3
18	14	(Switzerland) Toulo de Graffenried	Maserati	3:03.3	+20.7
19	2	(United Kingdom) Les Leston	Connaught-Alta	3:04.3	+21.7
20	8	(Brazil) Hermano da Silva Ramos	Gordini	3:04.8	+22.2
21	48	(United Kingdom) Bruce Halford	Maserati	3:05.0	+22.4
22	10	(France) Robert Manzon	Gordini	3:06.6	+24.0
23	4	(United Kingdom) Ron Flockhart	Connaught-Alta	3:08.1	+25.5
24	12	(France) André Simon	Gordini	3:13.3	+30.7
DNS	50	(Germany) Wolfgang von Trips	Ferrari		

=== Race ===
Pos	No	Driver	Constructor	Laps	Time/Retired	Grid	Points
1	36	(United Kingdom) Stirling Moss	Maserati	50	2:23:41.3	6	9^{1}
2	26	(United Kingdom) Peter Collins (Argentina) Juan Manuel Fangio	Ferrari	50	+5.7 secs	7	3; 3
3	4	(United Kingdom) Ron Flockhart	Connaught-Alta	49	+1 Lap	23	4
4	38	(Spain) Paco Godia	Maserati	49	+1 Lap	17	3
5	6	(United Kingdom) Jack Fairman	Connaught-Alta	47	+3 Laps	15	2
6	40	(Italy) Luigi Piotti	Maserati	47	+3 Laps	14	
7	14	(Switzerland) Toulo de Graffenried	Maserati	46	+4 Laps	18	
8	22	(Argentina) Juan Manuel Fangio (Italy) Eugenio Castellotti	Ferrari	46	+4 Laps	1	
9	12	(France) André Simon	Gordini	45	+5 Laps	24	
10	42	(Italy) Gerino Gerini	Maserati	42	+8 Laps	16	
11	44	(United Kingdom) Roy Salvadori	Maserati	41	+9 Laps	13	
Ret	28	(Italy) Luigi Musso	Ferrari	47	Steering	3	
Ret	46	(Italy) Umberto Maglioli (France) Jean Behra	Maserati	42	Steering	12	
Ret	18	(United States) Harry Schell	Vanwall	32	Transmission	10	
Ret	32	(France) Jean Behra	Maserati	23	Magneto	5	
Ret	48	(United Kingdom) Bruce Halford	Maserati	16	Engine	21	
Ret	20	(France) Maurice Trintignant	Vanwall	13	Transmission	11	
Ret	16	(Italy) Piero Taruffi	Vanwall	12	Oil Leak	4	
Ret	24	(Italy) Eugenio Castellotti	Ferrari	9	Tyre	2	
Ret	34	(Italy) Luigi Villoresi (Sweden) Jo Bonnier	Maserati	7	Engine	8	
Ret	10	(France) Robert Manzon	Gordini	7	Chassis	22	
Ret	30	(Spain) Alfonso de Portago	Ferrari	6	Tyre	9	
Ret	2	(United Kingdom) Les Leston	Connaught-Alta	6	Suspension	19	
Ret	8	(Brazil) Hermano da Silva Ramos	Gordini	3	Engine	20	
DNS	50	(Germany) Wolfgang von Trips	Ferrari		Practice Accident		

Notes

- ^1 – Includes 1 point for fastest lap

== Shared drives and championship permutations ==
- Shared Drives:
  - Car #26: Peter Collins (35 laps) and Juan Manuel Fangio (15 laps). They shared the 6 points for second place.
  - Car #22: Juan Manuel Fangio (30 laps) and Eugenio Castellotti (16 laps).
  - Car #46: Umberto Maglioli (31 laps) and Jean Behra (11 laps).
  - Car #34: Luigi Villoresi (4 laps) and Jo Bonnier (3 laps).
- Three drivers were fighting for the championship going into the race: Fangio on 30 points, Collins and Behra on 22 points.
  - Fangio would finish ahead of Collins and Behra in the Championship if:
    - Collins or Behra doesn't win the race or
    - Collins or Behra wins the race without fast lap and Fangio finished at least 3rd with fastest lap or
    - Fangio finished at least 2nd
  - Collins or Behra would finish ahead of Fangio in the Championship if:
    - Collins or Behra wins the race with fastest lap and Fangio finished 3rd or lower or
    - Collins wins the race without fastest lap and Fangio finished 3rd or lower without fastest lap as well

== Championship standings after the race ==
- **Bold text** indicates the World Champion.

Drivers' Championship standings

	Pos	Driver	Points
	1	(Argentina) **Juan Manuel Fangio**	30 (33)
2	2	(United Kingdom) Stirling Moss	27 (28)
1	3	(United Kingdom) Peter Collins	25
1	4	(France) Jean Behra	22
	5	(United States) Pat Flaherty	8

- Note: Only the top five positions are included. Only the best 5 results counted towards the Championship. Numbers without parentheses are Championship points; numbers in parentheses are total points scored.

Previous race: 1956 German Grand Prix	FIA Formula One World Championship; 1956 season	Next race: 1957 Argentine Grand Prix
Previous race: 1955 Italian Grand Prix	Italian Grand Prix	Next race: 1957 Italian Grand Prix
Previous race: 1955 Monaco Grand Prix	European Grand Prix (Designated European Grand Prix)	Next race: 1957 British Grand Prix
