= Gordini =

Automobile manufacturer

- Gordini Logo
- Type: Division
- Industry: Automotive
- Founded: 1946
- Headquarters: Les Ulis, France
- Parent: Renault Sport

(France) Gordini
Formula One World Championship career
- First entry: 1950 Monaco Grand Prix
- Races entered: 33
- Engines: Gordini, Simca
- Constructors' Championships: 0
- Drivers' Championships: 0
- Race victories: 0
- Podiums: 2
- Pole positions: 0
- Fastest laps: 1
- Final entry: 1956 Italian Grand Prix

Gordini (French pronunciation: [ɡɔʁdini]) is a division of Renault Sport Technologies (Renault Sport). In the past, it was a sports car manufacturer and performance tuner, established in 1946 by Amédée Gordini (1899–1979), nicknamed "Le Sorcier" (The Sorcerer). Gordini became a division of Renault in 1968 and of Renault Sport in 1976.

== History ==
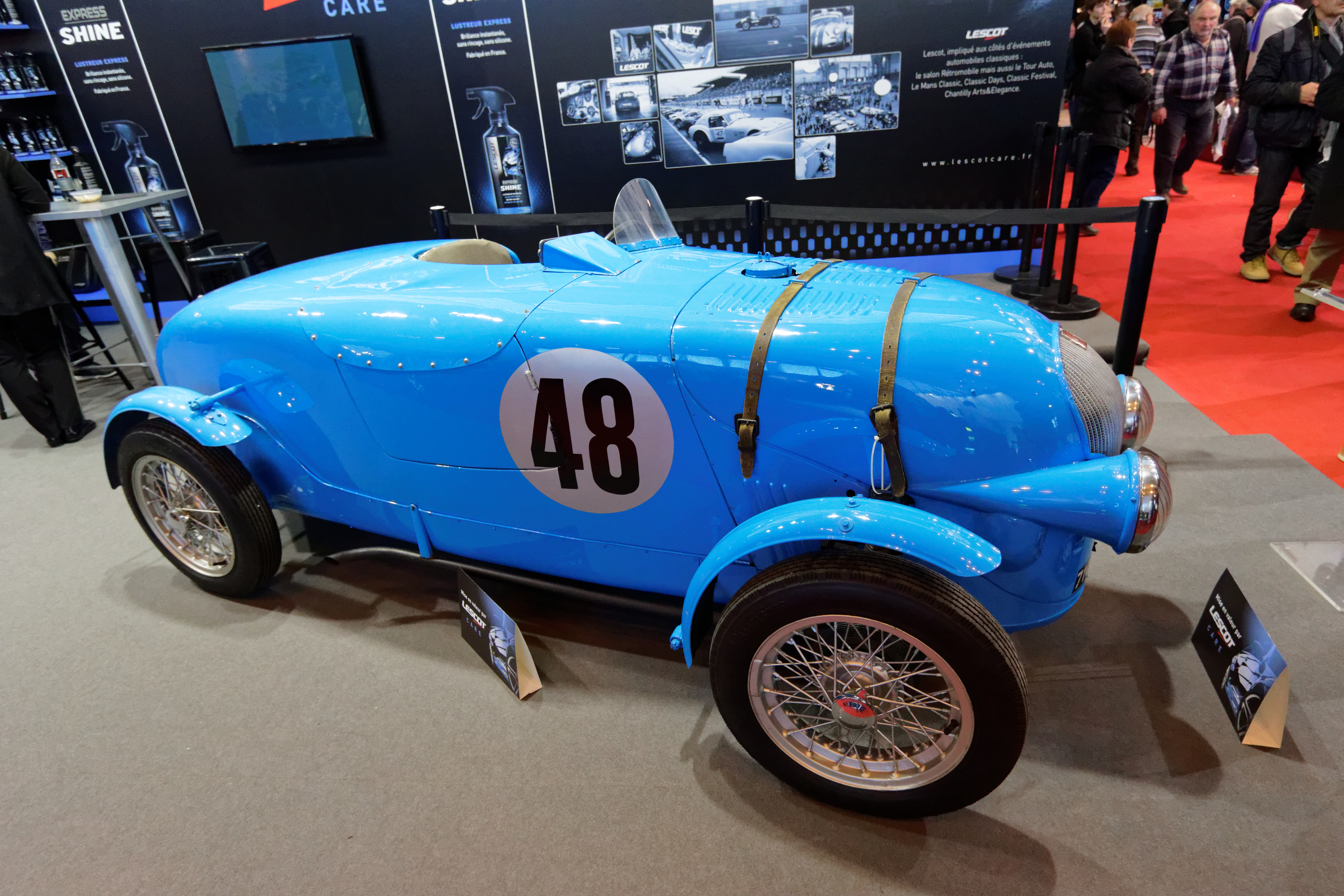
1937 Simca-Gordini Type 5 Le Mans

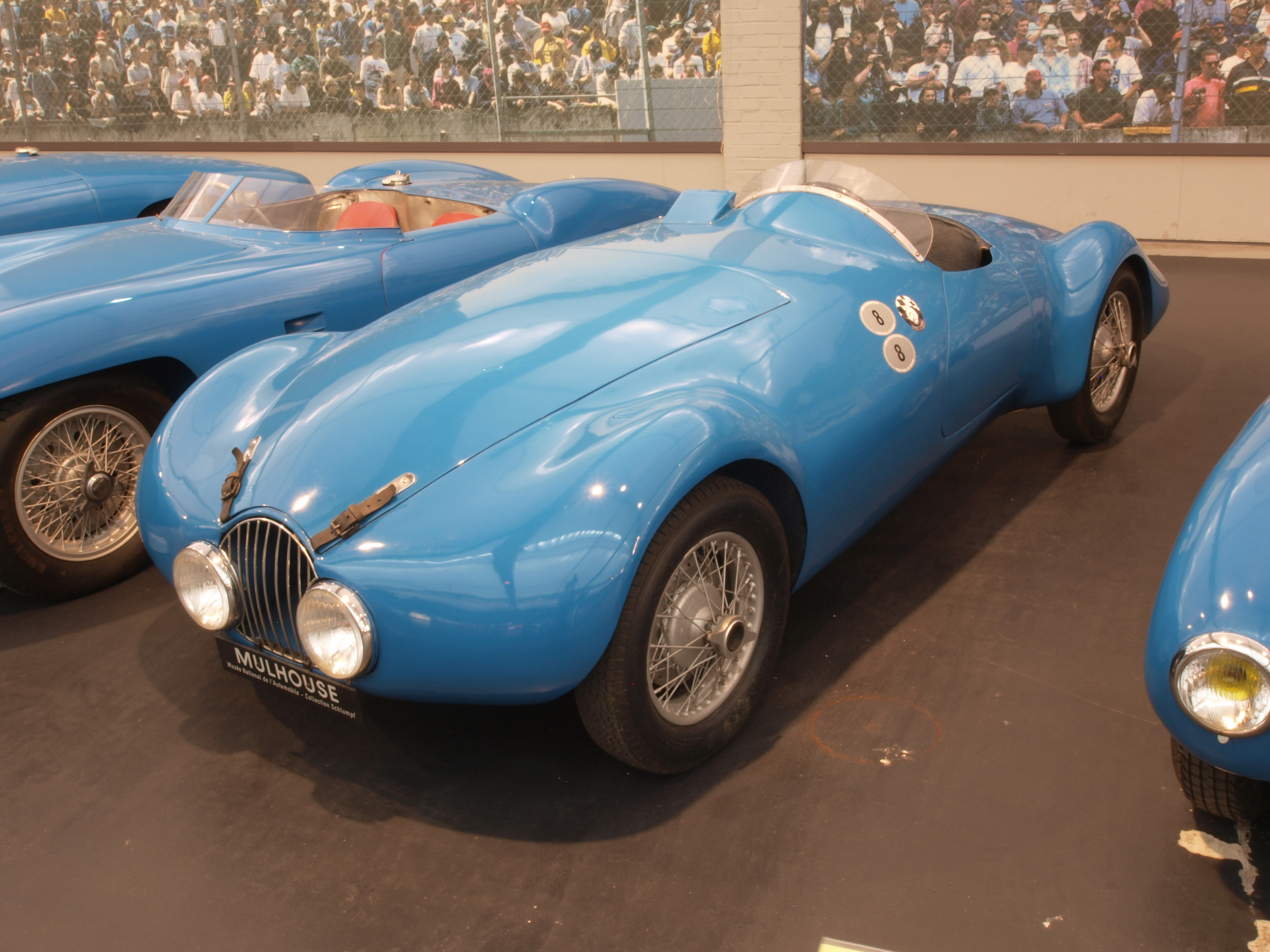
1939 Simca-Gordini Type 8

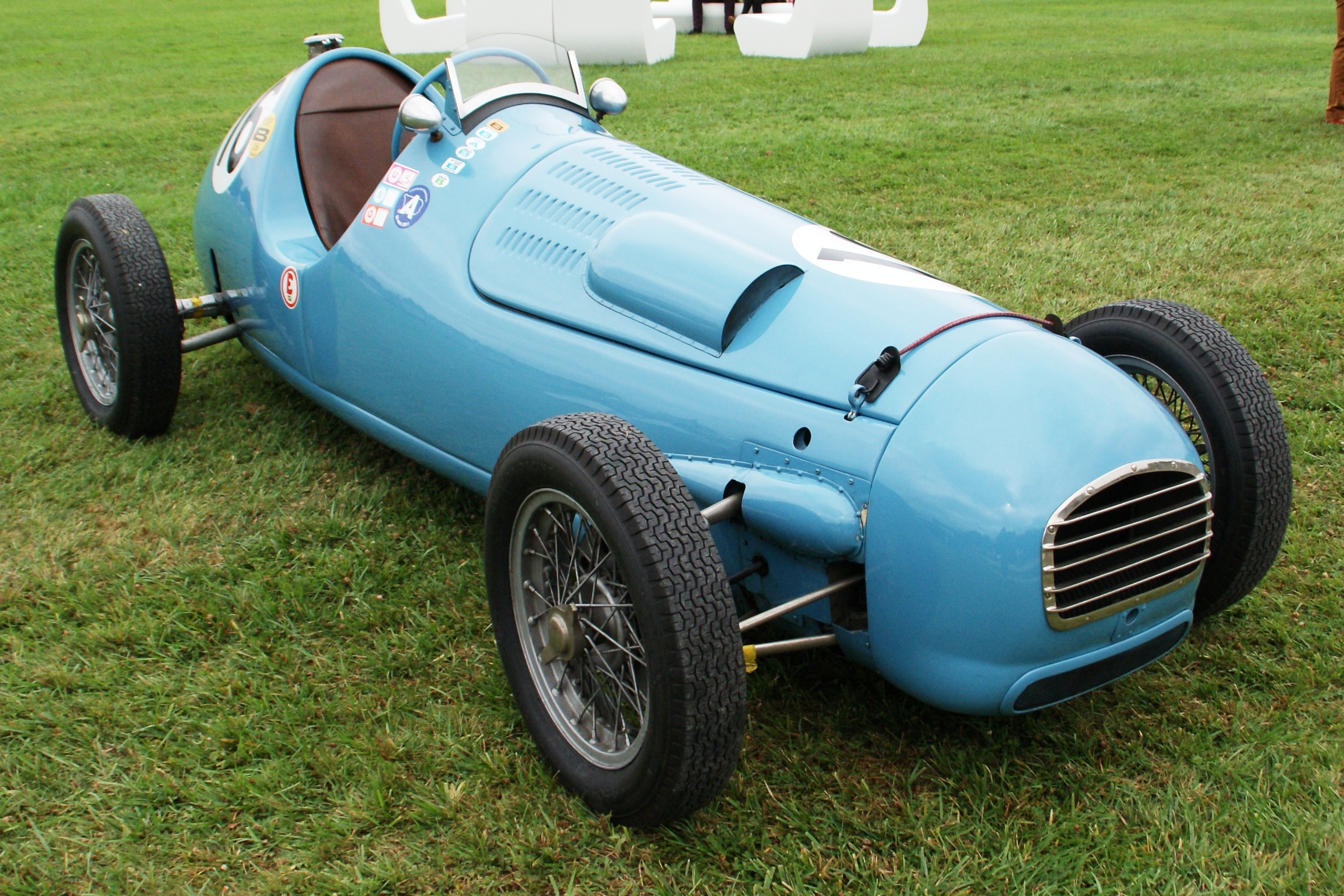
1946 Simca-Gordini 11

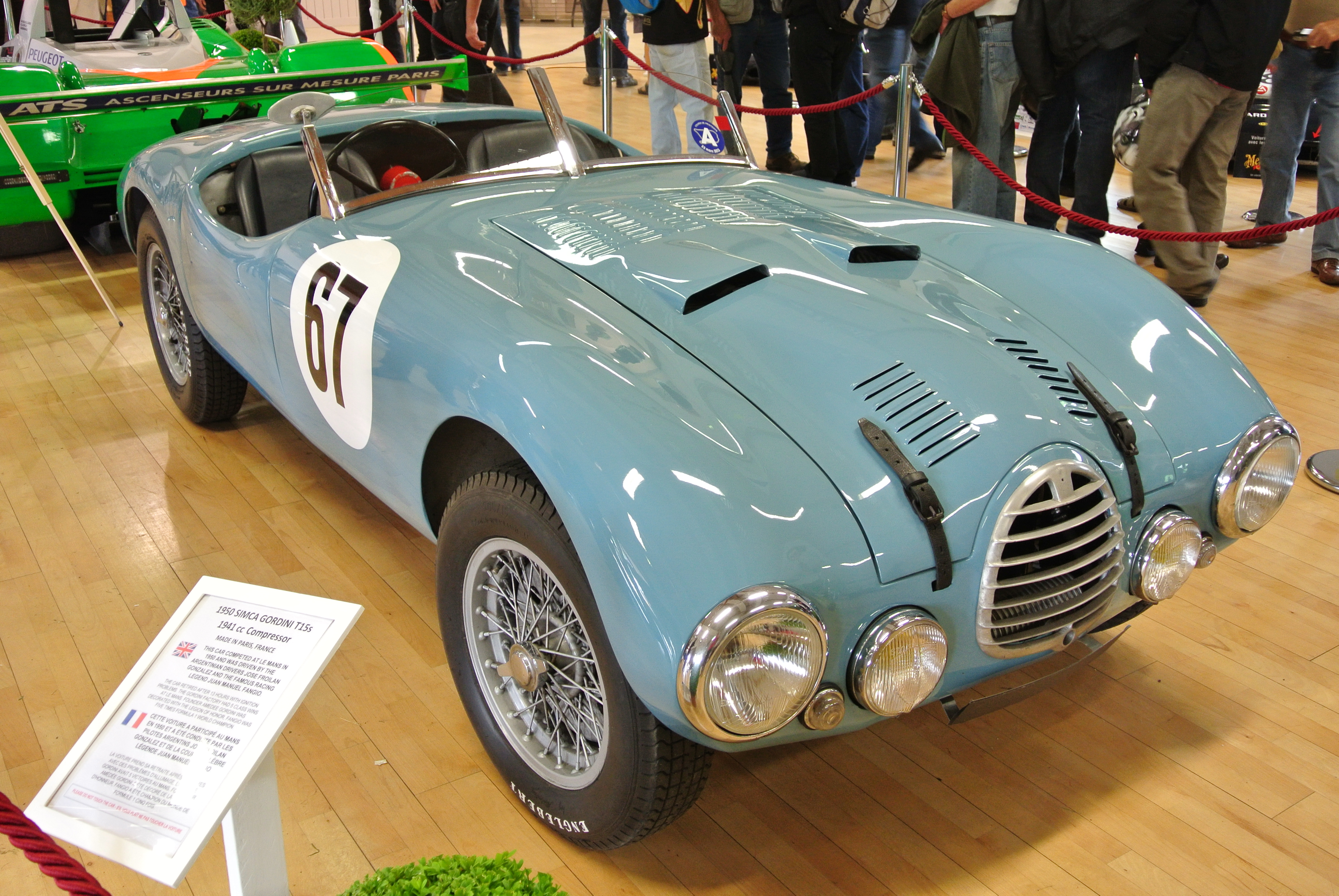
1950 Simca-Gordini T15s, as raced, and retired, at the 1950 24 Hours of Le Mans by José Froilán González and Juan Manuel Fangio

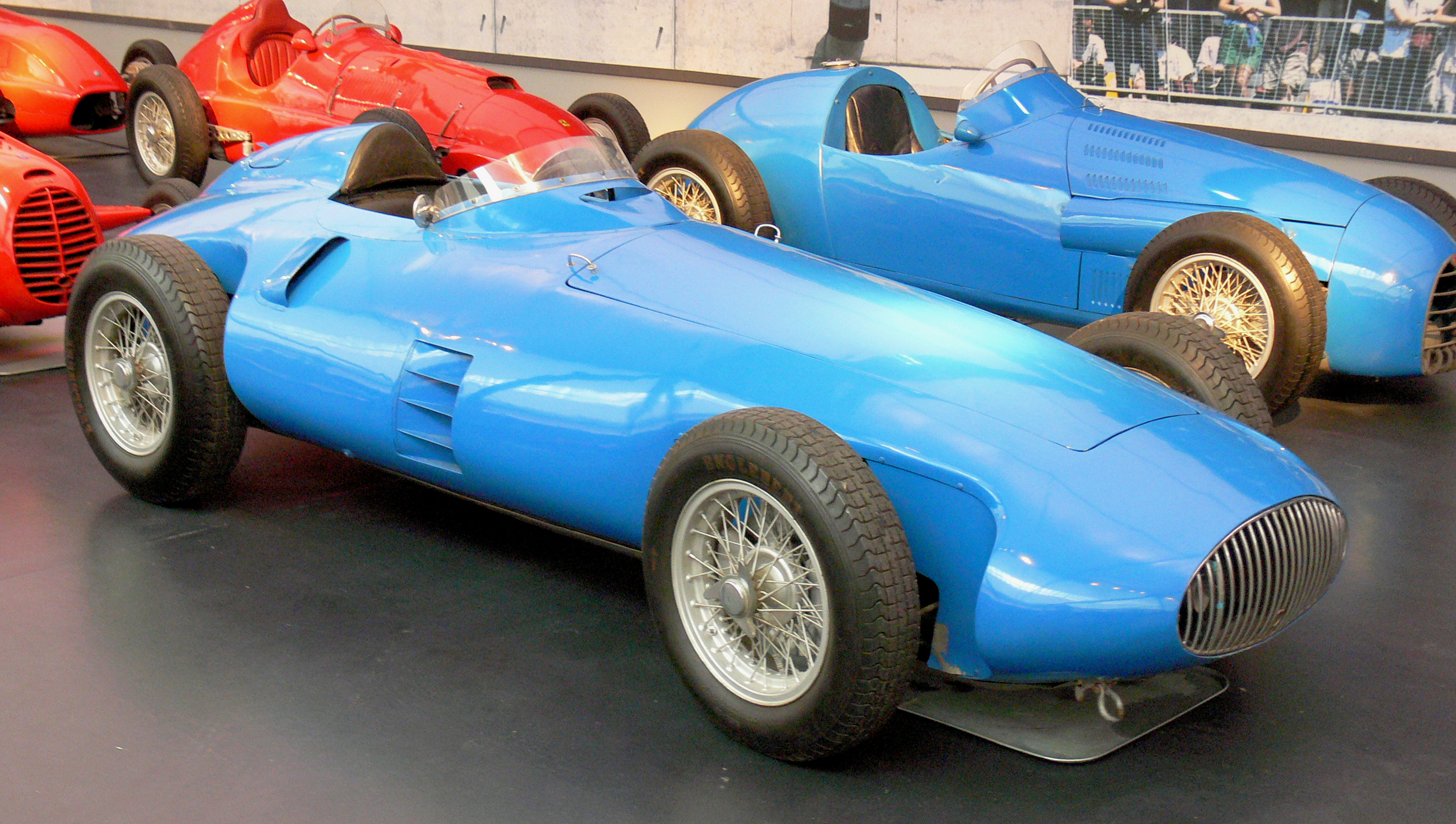
Gordini Type 16

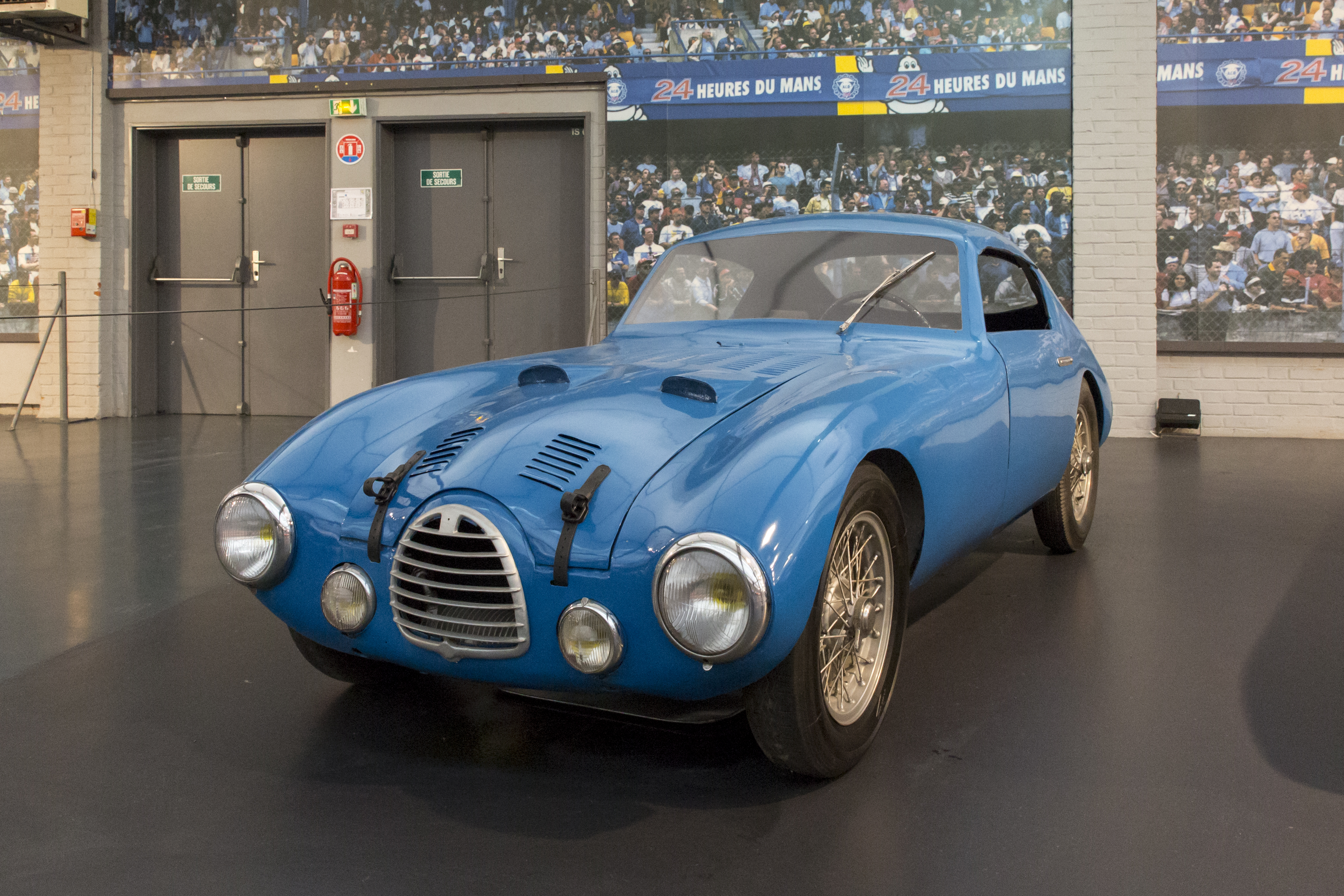
Simca-Gordini Type 21S

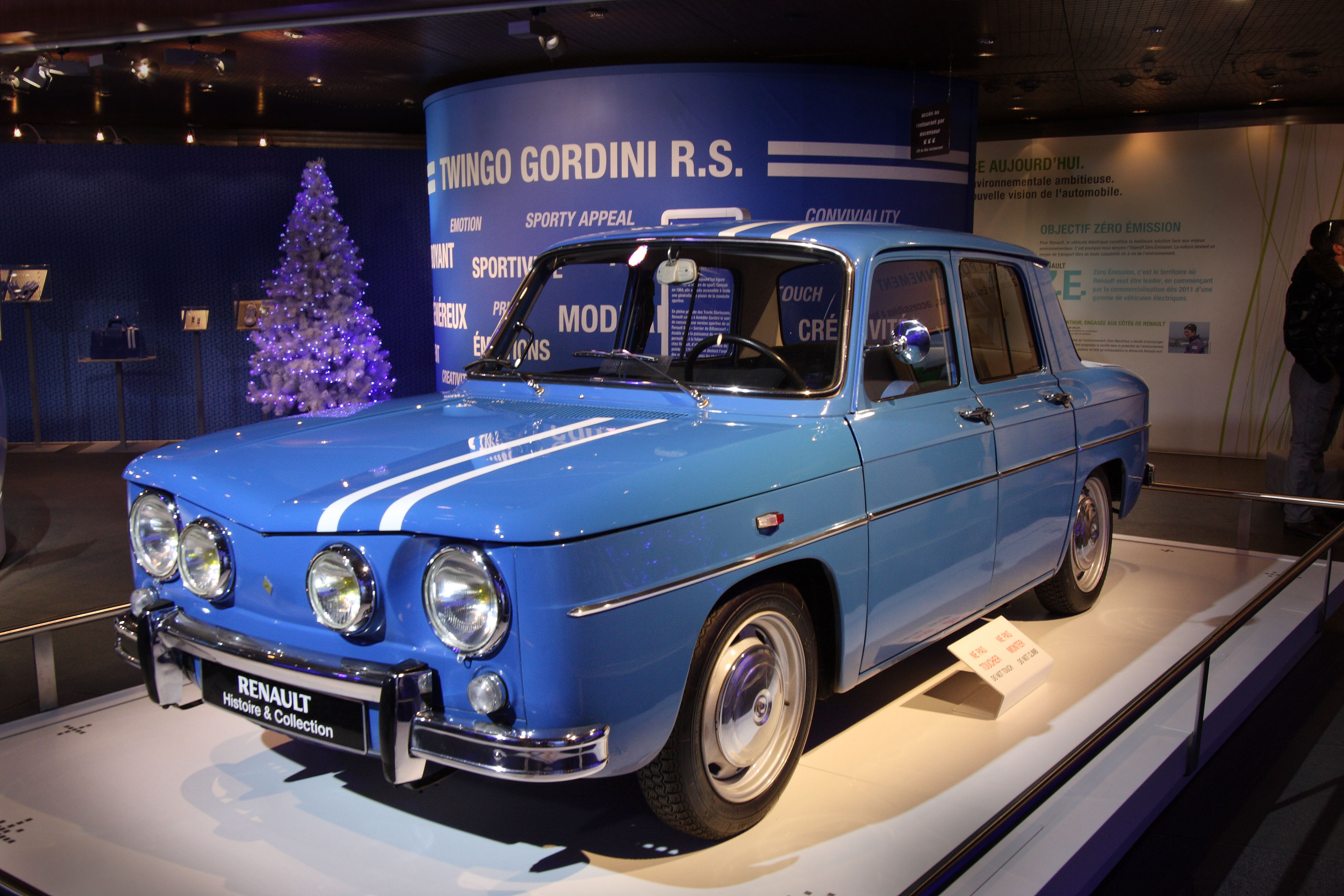
Renault 8 Gordini

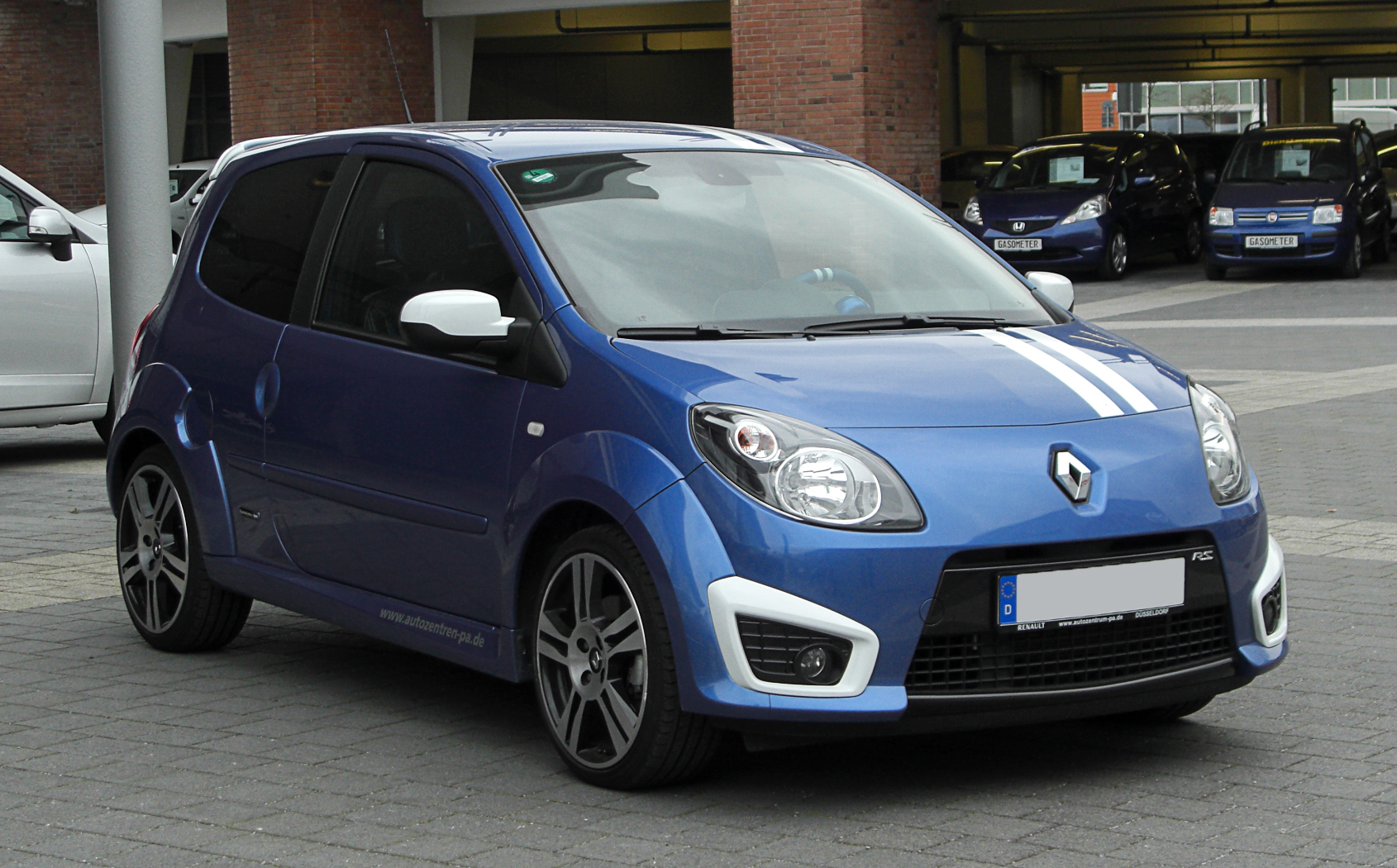

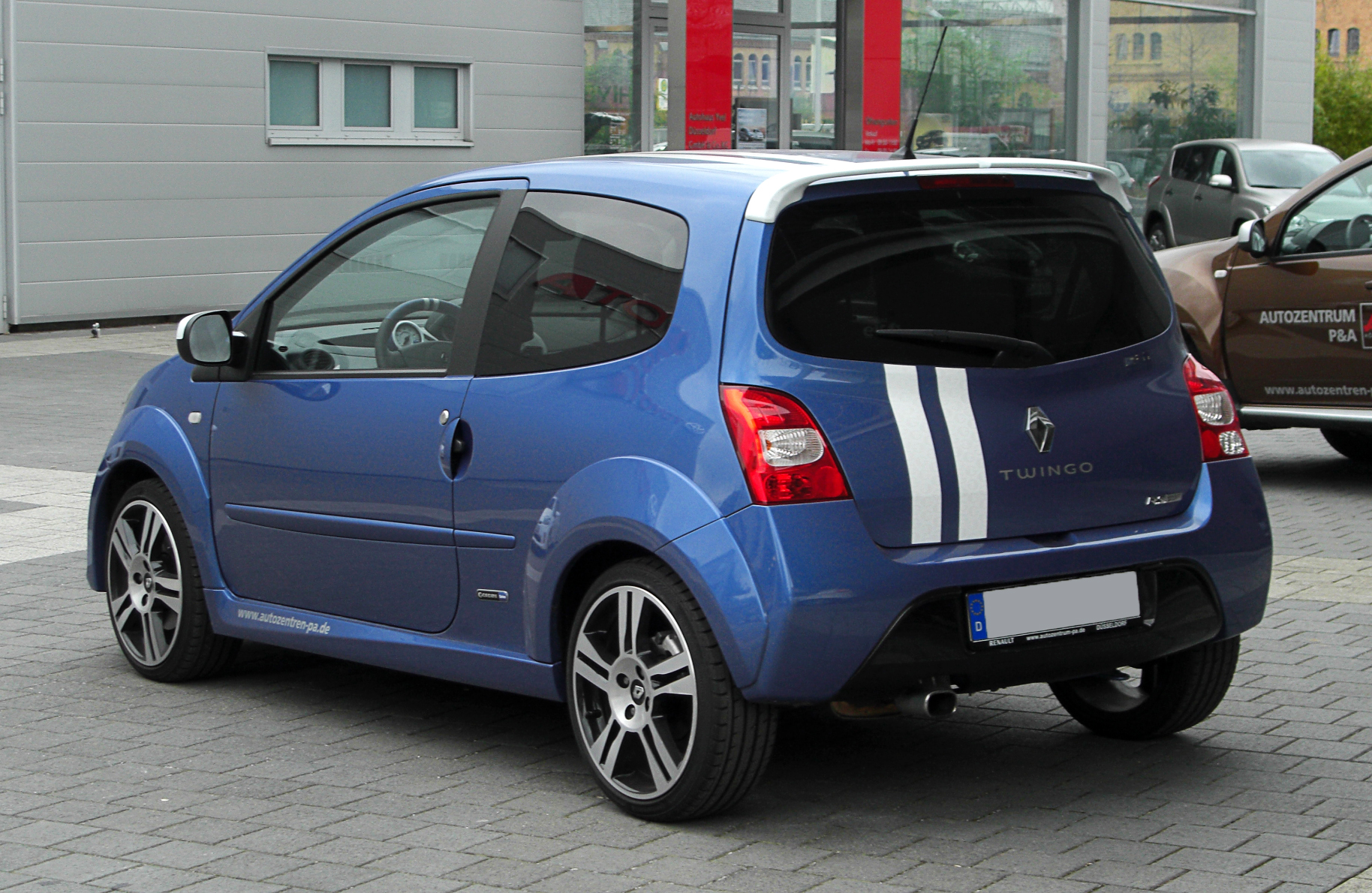
Renault Twingo RS Gordini

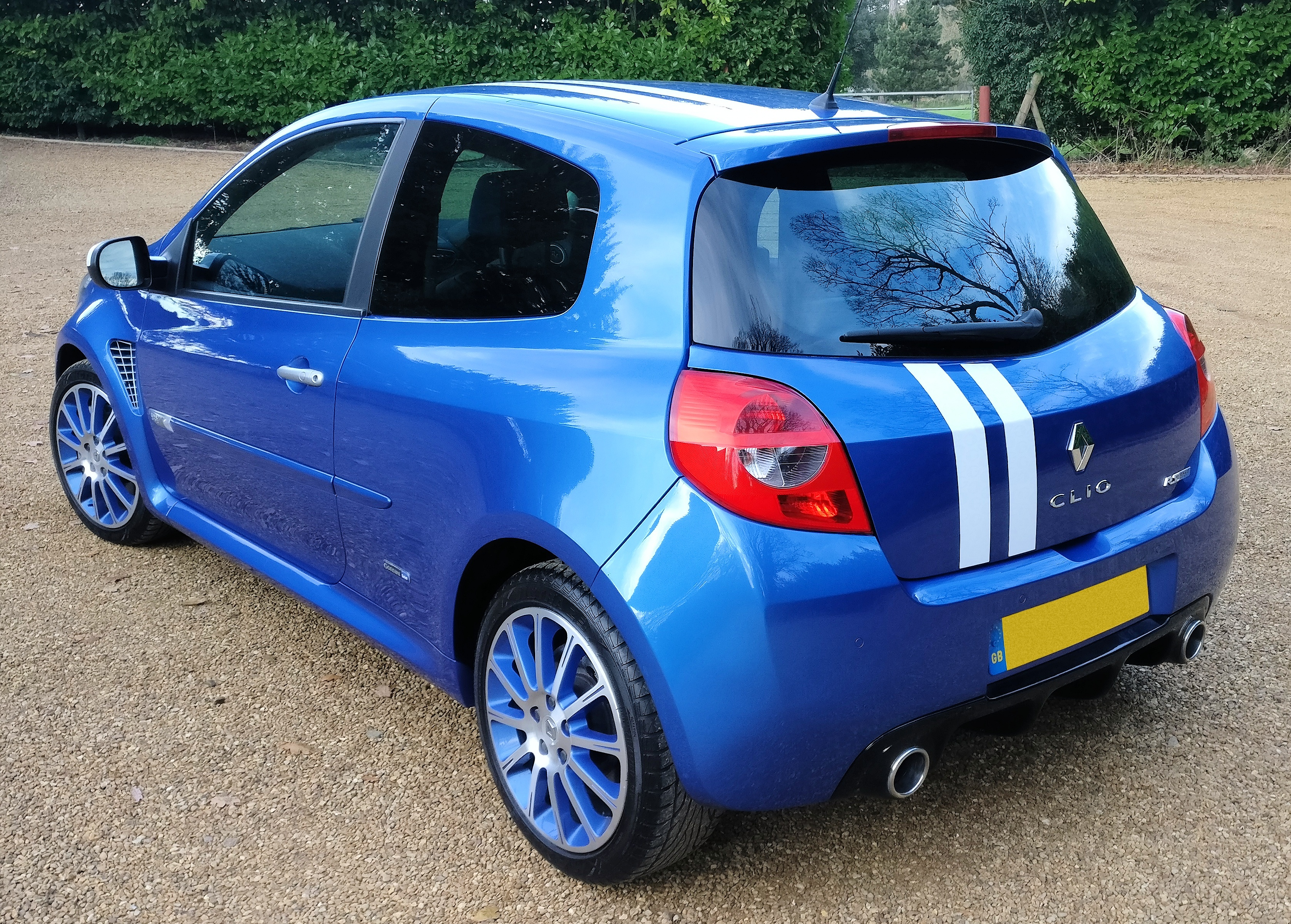
Clio Gordini

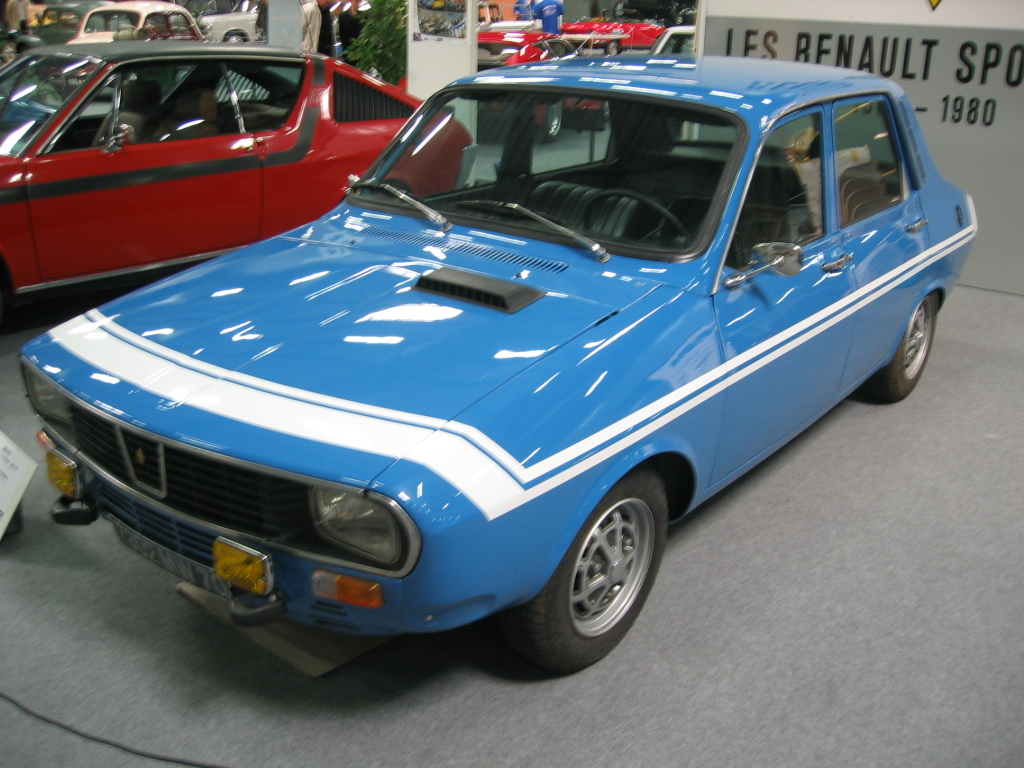
Renault 12 Gordini

Amédée Gordini tuned cars and competed in motor races since the 1930s. His results prompted Simca (the French assembler of Fiat) to hire him for its motorsport program and to develop road cars. Their association continued after World War II.

In 1946, Gordini introduced the first cars bearing his name, Fiat-engined single-seaters raced by him and José Scaron, achieving several victories. In the late 1940s, the company opened a workshop at the Boulevard Victor in Paris, entering sports car and Grand Prix races. Gordini and Simca started to diverge in 1951 because of political conflicts.

Gordini competed in Formula One from 1950 to 1956 (with a brief return in 1957 with an eight cylinder engine), although it achieved a major success in Formula Two during that period.

After its Formula One program ended, Gordini worked with Renault as an engine tuner, entering Renault-Gordini cars at the 24 Hours of Le Mans between 1962 and 1969. It also tuned engines for Alpine, a rival sports car manufacturer also associated with Renault. In 1957, Gordini and Renault manufactured the Dauphine Gordini, a modified version of the Renault Dauphine which was a sales success. Gordini-tuned Renault cars also won various rallies during the 1950s and 1960s. In 1963, the Gordini company planned to move its headquarters to Noisy-le-Roi. At the end of 1968, Amédée Gordini retired and sold a 70% majority stake from his firm to Renault. Renault-Gordini was moved to Viry-Châtillon in 1969 and became a sport division of Renault, before being merged with Alpine to form Renault Sport in 1976. On 1 January 1976, René Vuaillat became director of Gordini. The Gordini company name became wholly owned by Renault in 1977.

Renault sold Gordini-badged performance versions of models including the Renault 5, the Renault 8 the Renault 12 and the Renault 17.

In November 2009, Renault announced that it would be reviving the Gordini name for an exclusive line of hot hatches, in a similar fashion to Fiat's revival of its Abarth name. Modern models to bear the name include the Renault Twingo and the Renault Clio.

== Models ==
- Dauphine Gordini (1957–1967)
- Renault 8 Gordini (1964–1970)
- Renault 12 Gordini (1970–1974)
- Renault 17 Gordini (1974–1978)
- Renault 5 Gordini (1979-1985) UK market only, sold elsewhere as the Renault 5 Alpine
- Clio Gordini RS (2010–present)
- Twingo Gordini (2010–present)
- Twingo Gordini RS (2010–present)
- Wind Gordini (2011–2013)

== Car colours ==
Since its early Renault models the most characteristic colour scheme of Gordini cars has been bleu de France (the French motor racing colour) with white stripes, although different combinations have been used over the years.

== Formula One results ==
(key)

Year	Chassis	Engine	Driver	1	2	3	4	5	6	7	8	9
1950	Simca-Gordini Type 15	Gordini straight-4		GBR	MON	500	SUI	BEL	FRA	ITA		
1950	Simca-Gordini Type 15	Gordini straight-4	(France) Robert Manzon		Ret				4	Ret		
1950	Simca-Gordini Type 15	Gordini straight-4	(France) Maurice Trintignant		Ret					Ret		
1951	Simca-Gordini Type 15	Gordini straight-4		SUI	500	BEL	FRA	GBR	GER	ITA	ESP	
1951	Simca-Gordini Type 15	Gordini straight-4	(France) André Simon				Ret		Ret	6	Ret	
1951	Simca-Gordini Type 15	Gordini straight-4	(France) Robert Manzon				Ret		7	Ret	9	
1951	Simca-Gordini Type 15	Gordini straight-4	(France) Maurice Trintignant				Ret		Ret	DNS	Ret	
1951	Simca-Gordini Type 15	Gordini straight-4	(France) Aldo Gordini				Ret					
1951	Simca-Gordini Type 15	Gordini straight-4	(France) Jean Behra							Ret		
1952	Gordini Type 16	Gordini straight-6		SUI	500	BEL	FRA	GBR	GER	NED	ITA	
1952	Gordini Type 16	Gordini straight-6	(France) Robert Manzon	Ret		3	4	Ret	Ret	5	14	
1952	Gordini Type 16	Gordini straight-6	(France) Jean Behra	3		Ret	7		5	Ret	Ret	
1952	Gordini Type 16	Gordini straight-6	(Belgium) Johnny Claes			8						
1952	Gordini Type 16	Gordini straight-6	(Thailand) Prince Bira				Ret	11				
1952	Gordini Type 16	Gordini straight-6	(France) Maurice Trintignant					Ret	Ret	6	Ret	
1952	Simca-Gordini Type 11	Simca straight-4	(Switzerland) Max de Terra	Ret								
1952	Simca-Gordini Type 15	Gordini Straight-4	(Thailand) Prince Bira	Ret		10						
1952	Simca-Gordini Type 15	Gordini Straight-4	(Belgium) Johnny Claes				Ret	14			DNQ	
1952	Simca-Gordini Type 15	Gordini Straight-4	(United States) Robert O'Brien			NC						
1952	Simca-Gordini Type 15	Gordini Straight-4	(France) Maurice Trintignant				5					
1952	Simca-Gordini Type 15	Gordini Straight-4	(Belgium) Paul Frère							Ret		
1953	Gordini Type 16	Gordini straight-6		ARG	500	NED	BEL	FRA	GBR	GER	SUI	ITA
1953	Gordini Type 16	Gordini straight-6	(France) Jean Behra	6			Ret	10	Ret	Ret	Ret	
1953	Gordini Type 16	Gordini straight-6	(France) Maurice Trintignant	7†		6	5	Ret	Ret	Ret	Ret	5
1953	Gordini Type 16	Gordini straight-6	(United States) Harry Schell	7†		Ret	7	Ret	Ret	Ret		9
1953	Gordini Type 16	Gordini straight-6	(France) Robert Manzon	Ret								
1953	Gordini Type 16	Gordini straight-6	(Argentina) Carlos Menditeguy	Ret								
1953	Gordini Type 16	Gordini straight-6	(Argentina) Roberto Mieres			NC		Ret				6
1953	Gordini Type 16	Gordini straight-6	(United States) Fred Wacker				9					
1953	Simca-Gordini Type 15	Gordini straight-4	(Argentina) Pablo Birger	Ret								
1953	Simca-Gordini Type 15	Gordini straight-4	(Belgium) Georges Berger				Ret					
1954	Gordini Type 16	Gordini straight-6		ARG	500	BEL	FRA	GBR	GER	SUI	ITA	ESP
1954	Gordini Type 16	Gordini straight-6	(France) Jean Behra	DSQ		Ret	6	Ret^{F}	10	Ret	Ret	Ret
1954	Gordini Type 16	Gordini straight-6	(France) Élie Bayol	5								
1954	Gordini Type 16	Gordini straight-6	(France) Roger Loyer	Ret								
1954	Gordini Type 16	Gordini straight-6	(Belgium) Paul Frère			Ret	Ret		Ret			
1954	Gordini Type 16	Gordini straight-6	(Belgium) André Pilette			5		9	Ret			
1954	Gordini Type 16	Gordini straight-6	(France) Jacques Pollet				Ret					Ret
1954	Gordini Type 16	Gordini straight-6	(Belgium) Georges Berger				Ret					
1954	Gordini Type 16	Gordini straight-6	(Argentina) Clemar Bucci					Ret	Ret	Ret	Ret	
1954	Gordini Type 16	Gordini straight-6	(United States) Fred Wacker							Ret	6	
1955	Gordini Type 16	Gordini straight-6		ARG	MON	500	BEL	NED	GBR	ITA		
1955	Gordini Type 16	Gordini straight-6	(France) Élie Bayol	Ret	Ret							
1955	Gordini Type 16	Gordini straight-6	(Argentina) Jesús Iglesias	Ret								
1955	Gordini Type 16	Gordini straight-6	(Argentina) Pablo Birger	Ret								
1955	Gordini Type 16	Gordini straight-6	(France) Robert Manzon		Ret			Ret	Ret			
1955	Gordini Type 16	Gordini straight-6	(France) Jacques Pollet		7			10		Ret		
1955	Gordini Type 16	Gordini straight-6	(Brazil) Hermano da Silva Ramos					8	Ret	Ret		
1955	Gordini Type 16	Gordini straight-6	(France) Mike Sparken						7			
1955	Gordini Type 16	Gordini straight-6	(France) Jean Lucas							Ret		
1956	Gordini Type 32	Gordini straight-8		ARG	MON	500	BEL	FRA	GBR	GER	ITA	
1956	Gordini Type 32	Gordini straight-8	(Belgium) André Pilette		6†					DNS		
1956	Gordini Type 32	Gordini straight-8	(France) Élie Bayol		6†							
1956	Gordini Type 32	Gordini straight-8	(France) Robert Manzon					9	9	Ret	Ret	
1956	Gordini Type 32	Gordini straight-8	(Brazil) Hermano da Silva Ramos					8	Ret		Ret	
1956	Gordini Type 32	Gordini straight-8	(Belgium) André Milhoux							Ret		
1956	Gordini Type 16	Gordini straight-6	(Brazil) Hermano da Silva Ramos		5							
1956	Gordini Type 16	Gordini straight-6	(France) Robert Manzon		Ret							
1956	Gordini Type 16	Gordini straight-6	(Belgium) André Pilette					11				
1956	Gordini Type 16	Gordini straight-6	(France) André Simon								9	

(† indicates shared drive)
