= 1956 Monaco Grand Prix =

Coordinates: 43°44′4.74″N 7°25′16.8″E

| ← Previous race | Next race → |

Race details
- Date: 13 May 1956
- Official name: XIV Grand Prix Automobile de Monaco
- Location: Circuit de Monaco
- Course: Street Circuit
- Course length: 3.145 km (1.954 miles)
- Distance: 100 laps, 314.500 km (195.421 miles)
- Weather: Warm, dry, sunny

Pole position
| Driver | (Argentina) Juan Manuel Fangio | Ferrari |
- Time: 1:44.0

Fastest lap
| Driver | (Argentina) Juan Manuel Fangio | Ferrari |
- Time: 1:44.4

Podium
| First | (United Kingdom) Stirling Moss | Maserati |
| Second | (United Kingdom) Peter Collins (Argentina) Juan Manuel Fangio | Ferrari |
| Third | (France) Jean Behra | Maserati |

The 1956 Monaco Grand Prix was a Formula One motor race held on 13 May 1956 at Monaco. It was race 2 of 8 in the 1956 World Championship of Drivers.

The Owen's BRM made their first appearance but after qualifying both cars were withdrawn due to engine valve problems. The other two non-starters were the too-slow Scarlatti and Chiron due to his engine blowing up in practice.

Moss, starting from the middle of the front row, took the lead at Gasworks on the first lap and led every lap. Fangio was not having a good day. He hit the straw bales on lap 2, causing Schell and Musso to retire when trying to avoid him, and on lap 32 he hit the harbour wall, bending a rear wheel. He turned the car over to Castellotti after the pit stop to fix the wheel. On lap 54 while second, Collins came in the pit and turned his car over to Fangio. He resumed in third and passed Behra for second on lap 70, but he was 47 seconds behind Moss. On lap 86 Perdisa's brakes locked when being lapped by Moss, the resulting contact caused Moss's bonnet to lift allowing Fangio to close the gap by two seconds each lap but Moss won with a 6-second cushion.

== Classification ==
=== Qualifying ===
| Pos | No | Driver | Constructor | Time | Gap |
|---|---|---|---|---|---|
| 1 | 20 | (Argentina) Juan Manuel Fangio | Ferrari | 1:44.0 | — |
| 2 | 28 | (United Kingdom) Stirling Moss | Maserati | 1:44.6 | +0.6 |
| 3 | 22 | (Italy) Eugenio Castellotti | Ferrari | 1:44.9 | +0.9 |
| 4 | 30 | (France) Jean Behra | Maserati | 1:45.3 | +1.3 |
| 5 | 16 | (United States) Harry Schell | Vanwall | 1:45.6 | +1.6 |
| 6 | 14 | (France) Maurice Trintignant | Vanwall | 1:45.6 | +1.6 |
| 7 | 32 | (Italy) Cesare Perdisa | Maserati | 1:46.0 | +2.0 |
| 8 | 24 | (Italy) Luigi Musso | Ferrari | 1:46.8 | +2.8 |
| 9 | 26 | (United Kingdom) Peter Collins | Ferrari | 1:47.0 | +3.0 |
| 10 | 10 | (United Kingdom) Mike Hawthorn | BRM | 1:49.3 | +5.3 |
| 11 | 4 | (France) Élie Bayol | Gordini | 1:50.0 | +6.0 |
| 12 | 2 | (France) Robert Manzon | Gordini | 1:50.3 | +6.3 |
| 13 | 12 | (United Kingdom) Tony Brooks | BRM | 1:50.4 | +6.4 |
| 14 | 6 | (Brazil) Hermano da Silva Ramos | Gordini | 1:50.6 | +6.6 |
| 15 | 8 | (France) Louis Rosier | Maserati | 1:51.6 | +7.6 |
| 16 | 18 | (United Kingdom) Horace Gould | Maserati | 1:51.7 | +7.7 |
| DNQ | 36 | (Italy) Giorgio Scarlatti | Ferrari | 2:09.1 | +25.1 |
| WD | 34 | (Monaco) Louis Chiron | Maserati | | |

Note: Both BRM cars (Mike Hawthorn and Tony Brooks) withdrew after qualifying due to engine issues.

=== Race ===
| Pos | No | Driver | Constructor | Laps | Time/Retired | Grid | Points |
|---|---|---|---|---|---|---|---|
| 1 | 28 | (United Kingdom) Stirling Moss | Maserati | 100 | 3:00:32.9 | 2 | 8 |
| 2 | 26 | (United Kingdom) Peter Collins (Argentina) Juan Manuel Fangio | Ferrari | 100 | +6.1 sec | 9 | 3; 4^{1} |
| 3 | 30 | (France) Jean Behra | Maserati | 99 | +1 Lap | 4 | 4 |
| 4 | 20 | (Argentina) Juan Manuel Fangio (Italy) Eugenio Castellotti | Ferrari | 94 | +6 Laps | 1 | 0^{2} 1.5 |
| 5 | 6 | (Brazil) Hermano da Silva Ramos | Gordini | 93 | +7 Laps | 14 | 2 |
| 6 | 4 | (France) Élie Bayol (Belgium) André Pilette | Gordini | 88 | +12 Laps | 11 | |
| 7 | 32 | (Italy) Cesare Perdisa | Maserati | 86 | +14 Laps | 7 | |
| 8 | 18 | (United Kingdom) Horace Gould | Maserati | 85 | +15 Laps | 16 | |
| Ret | 2 | (France) Robert Manzon | Gordini | 90 | Accident | 12 | |
| Ret | 8 | (France) Louis Rosier | Maserati | 72 | Engine | 15 | |
| Ret | 22 | (Italy) Eugenio Castellotti | Ferrari | 14 | Clutch | 3 | |
| Ret | 14 | (France) Maurice Trintignant | Vanwall | 13 | Overheating | 6 | |
| Ret | 16 | (United States) Harry Schell | Vanwall | 2 | Accident | 5 | |
| Ret | 24 | (Italy) Luigi Musso | Ferrari | 2 | Accident | 8 | |
| DNQ | 36 | (Italy) Giorgio Scarlatti | Ferrari | | | | |
| WD | 10 | (United Kingdom) Mike Hawthorn | BRM | | Engine Valve | 10 | |
| WD | 12 | (United Kingdom) Tony Brooks | BRM | | Engine Valve | 13 | |
| WD | 34 | (Monaco) Louis Chiron | Maserati | | Blown Engine | | |

Notes

- ^1 – Includes 1 point for fastest lap
- ^2 – Fangio scored no points for fourth place as he had already scored points for finishing second

== Shared drives ==
- Car #26: Peter Collins (54 laps) and Juan Manuel Fangio (46 laps). They shared the 6 points for second place (Fangio also scored an extra point for achieving fastest lap).
- Car #20: Juan Manuel Fangio (40 laps) and Eugenio Castellotti (54 laps). Since Fangio received points for second, only Castellotti received the 1.5 points for the shared fourth.
- Car #4: Élie Bayol (44 laps) and André Pilette (44 laps).

== Championship standings after the race ==
Drivers' Championship standings

| | Pos | Driver | Points |
|---|---|---|---|
| | 1 | (France) Jean Behra | 10 |
| | 2 | (Argentina) Juan Manuel Fangio | 9 |
| 7 | 3 | (United Kingdom) Stirling Moss | 8 |
| 1 | 4 | (Italy) Luigi Musso | 4 |
| 1 | 5 | (United Kingdom) Mike Hawthorn | 4 |

- Note: Only the top five positions are included.

| Previous race: 1956 Argentine Grand Prix | FIA Formula One World Championship; 1956 season | Next race: 1956 Indianapolis 500 |
| Previous race: 1955 Monaco Grand Prix | Monaco Grand Prix | Next race: 1957 Monaco Grand Prix |
