= 1955 Dutch Grand Prix =

← Previous race	Next race →
- Zandvoort original layout

Race details
- Date: 19 June 1955
- Official name: V Grote Prijs van Nederland
- Location: Circuit Park Zandvoort, Zandvoort, Netherlands
- Course: Permanent racing facility
- Course length: 4.193 km (2.605 miles)
- Distance: 100 laps, 419.300 km (260.540 miles)
- Weather: Drizzly

Pole position
Driver	(Argentina) Juan Manuel Fangio	Mercedes
- Time: 1:40.0

Fastest lap
Driver	(Argentina) Roberto Mieres	Maserati
- Time: 1:40.9 on lap 3

Podium
First	(Argentina) Juan Manuel Fangio	Mercedes
Second	(United Kingdom) Stirling Moss	Mercedes
Third	(Italy) Luigi Musso	Maserati

The 1955 Dutch Grand Prix was a Formula One motor race held at Zandvoort on June 19, 1955. It was race 5 of 7 in the 1955 World Championship of Drivers.

The 100-lap race took place the weekend after the 1955 Le Mans disaster in which over 80 people perished, among them Mercedes driver Pierre Levegh while Juan Manuel Fangio narrowly escaped. The remaining two Mercedes 300 SLR were withdrawn during the night while in the lead. In Zandvoort, Mercedes came back with three F1 cars which dominated practise, qualified for the first row, and scored another 1-2 Mercedes win.

The Lancia team remained absent, having retired after the fatal crash of Ascari. The GP was won by Fangio after he started from pole position ahead of his teammate Stirling Moss while Karl Kling, a second slower in practise, could not keep up with the leaders and spun off on the slippery track. Maserati driver Luigi Musso came in third, which ended a 35-race streak of a Ferrari ending on a World Championship Grand Prix podium since the 1950 French Grand Prix (excluding the Indianapolis 500 that was part of the WC calendar).

== Race report ==
Despite a track made slippery by continuous drizzle, the record crowd was treated to some outstanding driving as the masters slid their machines through the sand-dunes. Fangio and Moss again took up the lead with Musso's Maserati in pursuit. Kling and Behra were chasing furiously until the German spun into the sand and retired. Behra still suffered from leg injuries sustained during practice in Le Mans when he got hit by a car in the pits, preventing him from taking part in the 24h. He was passed by Mieres who took up the challenge to close the gap. However, Musso was too far ahead and was even catching the Mercedes pair who were having to go at full pelt to keep ahead. It was only when he spun off and dropped back that they could relax slightly.

It was another impressive 1-2 for them, despite Moss sustaining a smoking engine late on in the race. Musso had given them a hard challenge and Fangio was the first to congratulate him on his podium finish.

== Entries ==
Team	No	Driver	Car	Engine	Tyre
(Italy) Scuderia Ferrari	2	(United Kingdom) Mike Hawthorn	Ferrari 555	Ferrari 555 2.5 L4	E
(Italy) Scuderia Ferrari	4	(France) Maurice Trintignant	Ferrari 555	Ferrari 555 2.5 L4	E
(Italy) Scuderia Ferrari	6	(Italy) Eugenio Castellotti	Ferrari 555	Ferrari 555 2.5 L4	E
(Germany) Daimler Benz AG	8	(Argentina) Juan Manuel Fangio	Mercedes-Benz W196	Mercedes M196 2.5 L8	C
(Germany) Daimler Benz AG	10	(United Kingdom) Stirling Moss	Mercedes-Benz W196	Mercedes M196 2.5 L8	C
(Germany) Daimler Benz AG	12	(Germany) Karl Kling	Mercedes-Benz W196	Mercedes M196 2.5 L8	C
(Italy) Officine Alfieri Maserati	14	(France) Jean Behra	Maserati 250F	Maserati 250F1 2.5 L6	P
(Italy) Officine Alfieri Maserati	16	(Argentina) Roberto Mieres	Maserati 250F	Maserati 250F1 2.5 L6	P
(Italy) Officine Alfieri Maserati	18	(Italy) Luigi Musso	Maserati 250F	Maserati 250F1 2.5 L6	P
(France) Equipe Gordini	20	(France) Robert Manzon	Gordini T16	Gordini 23 2.5 L6	E
(France) Equipe Gordini	22	(Brazil) Hermano da Silva Ramos	Gordini T16	Gordini 23 2.5 L6	E
(France) Equipe Gordini	24	(France) Jacques Pollet	Gordini T16	Gordini 23 2.5 L6	E
(United Kingdom) Stirling Moss Ltd	26	(United Kingdom) Peter Walker	Maserati 250F	Maserati 250F1 2.5 L6	D
(France) Ecurie Rosier	28	(France) Louis Rosier	Maserati 250F	Maserati 250F1 2.5 L6	P
(Belgium) Equipe Nationale Belge	30	(Belgium) Johnny Claes	Ferrari 625 F1	Ferrari 625 2.5 L4	E
(United Kingdom) Gould's Garage (Bristol)	32	(United Kingdom) Horace Gould	Maserati 250F	Maserati 250F1 2.5 L6	D

== Classification ==
=== Qualifying ===
Pos	No	Driver	Constructor	Time	Gap
1	8	(Argentina) Juan Manuel Fangio	Mercedes	1:40.0	—
2	10	(United Kingdom) Stirling Moss	Mercedes	1:40.4	+0.4
3	12	(Germany) Karl Kling	Mercedes	1:41.1	+1.1
4	18	(Italy) Luigi Musso	Maserati	1:41.2	+1.2
5	2	(United Kingdom) Mike Hawthorn	Ferrari	1:41.5	+1.5
6	14	(France) Jean Behra	Maserati	1:41.5	+1.5
7	16	(Argentina) Roberto Mieres	Maserati	1:42.1	+2.1
8	4	(France) Maurice Trintignant	Ferrari	1:42.4	+2.4
9	6	(Italy) Eugenio Castellotti	Ferrari	1:42.7	+2.7
10	26	(United Kingdom) Peter Walker	Maserati	1:44.9	+4.9
11	20	(France) Robert Manzon	Gordini	1:46.0	+6.0
12	24	(France) Jacques Pollet	Gordini	1:48.6	+8.6
13	28	(France) Louis Rosier	Maserati	1:49.2	+9.2
14	22	(Brazil) Hermano da Silva Ramos	Gordini	1:50.2	+10.2
15	32	(United Kingdom) Horace Gould	Maserati	1:50.4	+10.4
16	30	(Belgium) Johnny Claes	Ferrari	1:53.3	+13.3

=== Race ===
Pos	No	Driver	Constructor	Laps	Time/Retired	Grid	Points
1	8	(Argentina) Juan Manuel Fangio	Mercedes	100	2:54:23.8	1	8
2	10	(United Kingdom) Stirling Moss	Mercedes	100	+0.3	2	6
3	18	(Italy) Luigi Musso	Maserati	100	+57.1	4	4
4	16	(Argentina) Roberto Mieres	Maserati	99	+1 Lap	7	4^{1}
5	6	(Italy) Eugenio Castellotti	Ferrari	97	+3 Laps	9	2
6	14	(France) Jean Behra	Maserati	97	+3 Laps	6	
7	2	(United Kingdom) Mike Hawthorn	Ferrari	95	+5 Laps	5	
8	22	(Brazil) Hermano da Silva Ramos	Gordini	92	+8 Laps	14	
9	28	(France) Louis Rosier	Maserati	92	+8 Laps	13	
10	24	(France) Jacques Pollet	Gordini	90	+10 Laps	12	
11	30	(Belgium) Johnny Claes	Ferrari	88	+12 Laps	16	
Ret	4	(France) Maurice Trintignant	Ferrari	65	Gearbox	8	
Ret	20	(France) Robert Manzon	Gordini	44	Transmission	11	
Ret	32	(United Kingdom) Horace Gould	Maserati	23	Spun Off	15	
Ret	12	(Germany) Karl Kling	Mercedes	21	Spun Off	3	
Ret	26	(United Kingdom) Peter Walker	Maserati	2	Wheel Bearing	10	

Notes

- ^1 – Includes 1 point for fastest lap

== Championship standings after the race ==
Drivers' Championship standings

	Pos	Driver	Points
	1	(Argentina) Juan Manuel Fangio	27
3	2	(United Kingdom) Stirling Moss	13
1	3	(France) Maurice Trintignant	11 1/3
1	4	(Italy) Nino Farina	10 1/3
1	5	(United States) Bob Sweikert	8

- Note: Only the top five positions are included.

Previous race: 1955 Belgian Grand Prix	FIA Formula One World Championship; 1955 season	Next race: 1955 British Grand Prix
Previous race: 1953 Dutch Grand Prix	Dutch Grand Prix	Next race: 1958 Dutch Grand Prix
