= 1955 Italian Grand Prix =

← Previous race	Next race →
- Autodromo Nazionale di Monza layout

Race details
- Date: September 11, 1955
- Official name: XXVI Gran Premio d'Italia
- Location: Autodromo Nazionale di Monza, Monza, Italy
- Course: Permanent road course
- Course length: 10.000 km (6.214 miles)
- Distance: 50 laps, 500.023 km (310.700 miles)

Pole position
Driver	(Argentina) Juan Manuel Fangio	Mercedes
- Time: 2:46.5

Fastest lap
Driver	(United Kingdom) Stirling Moss	Mercedes
- Time: 2:46.9

Podium
First	(Argentina) Juan Manuel Fangio	Mercedes
Second	(Italy) Piero Taruffi	Mercedes
Third	(Italy) Eugenio Castellotti	Ferrari

The 1955 Italian Grand Prix was a Formula One motor race held at Autodromo Nazionale di Monza, in Monza, Italy on 11 September 1955. It was the seventh and final race of the 1955 World Championship of Drivers.

In the wake of the 1955 Le Mans disaster, the championship was still open after the British Grand Prix; although after that race (with the French Grand Prix already having been cancelled) the German, Swiss and Spanish Grands Prix were all cancelled. This meant that Fangio won the world driver's championship for the 3rd time and the 2nd time in succession.

The Monza circuit near Milan had been revamped and resurfaced, and had been given all new pit and safety facilities. A new concrete banking had been constructed over where the original slightly banked version was, and the combined 10 km (6.214 mi) Monza circuit was used for the first time since 1933. The Curva Sud had also been modified from 2 right hand corners into one sweeping right-hander known as the "Parabolica", where run-off area was implemented.

Of the 4 factory Mercedes cars in the race, Fangio and Moss drove the streamlined, closed-wheel W196's, while Kling and Taruffi drove open-wheel W196's. This was the 4th and last appearance of the streamlined Mercedes cars at a championship GP as well as the third and last time in Formula One history that a race had been won by a closed-wheel car.

This was the last Grand Prix race for 1950 world champion Nino Farina. This was also the last Grand Prix win for a Mercedes-Benz as an engine manufacturer until David Coulthard won the 1997 Australian Grand Prix and the last Grand Prix win for Mercedes-Benz as a constructor until Nico Rosberg won the 2012 Chinese Grand Prix, and also the last 1-2 finish for Mercedes-Benz as an engine manufacturer until Mika Häkkinen and Coulthard at the 1997 European Grand Prix, as well as the last 1-2 finish for Mercedes-Benz as a constructor until Lewis Hamilton and Rosberg at the 2014 Malaysian Grand Prix.

== Entries ==
Team	No	Driver	Car	Engine	Tyre
(Italy) Scuderia Ferrari	2	(Italy) Nino Farina	Lancia D50	Lancia DS50 2.5 V8	E
(Italy) Scuderia Ferrari	4	(Italy) Eugenio Castellotti	Ferrari 555	Ferrari 555 2.5 L4	E
(Italy) Scuderia Ferrari	6	(United Kingdom) Mike Hawthorn	Ferrari 555	Ferrari 555 2.5 L4	E
(Italy) Scuderia Ferrari	8	(France) Maurice Trintignant	Ferrari 555	Ferrari 555 2.5 L4	E
(Italy) Scuderia Ferrari	12	(Italy) Umberto Maglioli	Ferrari 555	Ferrari 555 2.5 L4	E
(Italy) Scuderia Lancia	10	(Italy) Luigi Villoresi	Lancia D50	Lancia DS50 2.5 V8	P
(Germany) Daimler Benz AG	14	(Italy) Piero Taruffi	Mercedes-Benz W196	Mercedes M196 2.5 L8	C
(Germany) Daimler Benz AG	16	(United Kingdom) Stirling Moss	Mercedes-Benz W196	Mercedes M196 2.5 L8	C
(Germany) Daimler Benz AG	18	(Argentina) Juan Manuel Fangio	Mercedes-Benz W196	Mercedes M196 2.5 L8	C
(Germany) Daimler Benz AG	20	(Germany) Karl Kling	Mercedes-Benz W196	Mercedes M196 2.5 L8	C
(France) Equipe Gordini	22	(Brazil) Hermano da Silva Ramos	Gordini T16	Gordini 23 2.5 L6	E
(France) Equipe Gordini	24	(France) Jean Lucas	Gordini T16	Gordini 23 2.5 L6	E
(France) Equipe Gordini	26	(France) Jacques Pollet	Gordini T16	Gordini 23 2.5 L6	E
(Italy) Officine Alfieri Maserati	28	(Argentina) Roberto Mieres	Maserati 250F	Maserati 250F1 2.5 L6	P
(Italy) Officine Alfieri Maserati	30	(Italy) Luigi Musso	Maserati 250F	Maserati 250F1 2.5 L6	P
(Italy) Officine Alfieri Maserati	32	(United Kingdom) Peter Collins	Maserati 250F	Maserati 250F1 2.5 L6	P
(Italy) Officine Alfieri Maserati	34	(Argentina) Carlos Menditeguy	Maserati 250F	Maserati 250F1 2.5 L6	P
(Italy) Officine Alfieri Maserati	36	(France) Jean Behra	Maserati 250F	Maserati 250F1 2.5 L6	P
(Italy) Officine Alfieri Maserati	38	(United Kingdom) Horace Gould	Maserati 250F	Maserati 250F1 2.5 L6	P
(United Kingdom) Stirling Moss Ltd	40	(United States) John Fitch	Maserati 250F	Maserati 250F1 2.5 L6	D
(United Kingdom) Vandervell Products	42	(United States) Harry Schell	Vanwall VW 55	Vanwall 254 2.5 L4	P
(United Kingdom) Vandervell Products	44	(United Kingdom) Ken Wharton	Vanwall VW 55	Vanwall 254 2.5 L4	P
(Italy) Scuderia Volpini	46	(Italy) Luigi Piotti	Arzani-Volpini	Maserati 4CLT 2.5 L4	P

== Classification ==
=== Qualifying ===
Pos	No	Driver	Constructor	Time	Gap
1	18	(Argentina) Juan Manuel Fangio	Mercedes	2:46.5	—
2	16	(United Kingdom) Stirling Moss	Mercedes	2:46.8	+0.3
3	20	(Germany) Karl Kling	Mercedes	2:48.3	+1.8
4	4	(Italy) Eugenio Castellotti	Ferrari	2:49.6	+3.1
5	2	(Italy) Nino Farina	Lancia	2:49.9	+3.4
6	36	(France) Jean Behra	Maserati	2:50.1	+3.6
7	28	(Argentina) Roberto Mieres	Maserati	2:51.1	+4.6
8	10	(Italy) Luigi Villoresi	Lancia	2:51.6	+5.1
9	14	(Italy) Piero Taruffi	Mercedes	2:51.8	+5.3
10	30	(Italy) Luigi Musso	Maserati	2:52.1	+5.6
11	32	(United Kingdom) Peter Collins	Maserati	2:55.3	+8.8
12	12	(Italy) Umberto Maglioli	Ferrari	2:55.4	+8.9
13	42	(United States) Harry Schell	Vanwall	2:55.5	+9.0
14	6	(United Kingdom) Mike Hawthorn	Ferrari	2:56.2	+9.7
15	8	(France) Maurice Trintignant	Ferrari	2:56.3	+9.8
16	34	(Argentina) Carlos Menditeguy	Maserati	2:58.4	+11.9
17	44	(United Kingdom) Ken Wharton	Vanwall	2:59.5	+13.0
18	22	(Brazil) Hermano da Silva Ramos	Gordini	2:59.8	+13.3
19	26	(France) Jacques Pollet	Gordini	2:59.9	+13.4
20	40	(United States) John Fitch	Maserati	3:03.1	+16.6
21	38	(United Kingdom) Horace Gould	Maserati	3:05.2	+18.7
22	24	(France) Jean Lucas	Gordini	3:15.9	+29.4
DNS	46	(Italy) Luigi Piotti	Arzani-Volpini-Maserati		

=== Race ===
Pos	No	Driver	Constructor	Laps	Time/Retired	Grid	Points
1	18	(Argentina) Juan Manuel Fangio	Mercedes	50	2:25:04.4	1	8
2	14	(Italy) Piero Taruffi	Mercedes	50	+0.7	9	6
3	4	(Italy) Eugenio Castellotti	Ferrari	50	+46.2	4	4
4	36	(France) Jean Behra	Maserati	50	+3:57.5	6	3
5	34	(Argentina) Carlos Menditeguy	Maserati	49	+1 Lap	16	2
6	12	(Italy) Umberto Maglioli	Ferrari	49	+1 Lap	12	
7	28	(Argentina) Roberto Mieres	Maserati	48	+2 Laps	7	
8	8	(France) Maurice Trintignant	Ferrari	47	+3 Laps	15	
9	40	(United States) John Fitch	Maserati	46	+4 Laps	20	
10	6	(United Kingdom) Mike Hawthorn	Ferrari	38	Gearbox	14	
Ret	20	(Germany) Karl Kling	Mercedes	32	Gearbox	3	
Ret	30	(Italy) Luigi Musso	Maserati	31	Gearbox	10	
Ret	38	(United Kingdom) Horace Gould	Maserati	31	Suspension	21	
Ret	16	(United Kingdom) Stirling Moss	Mercedes	27	Engine	2	1^{1}
Ret	26	(France) Jacques Pollet	Gordini	26	Engine	19	
Ret	22	(Brazil) Hermano da Silva Ramos	Gordini	23	Fuel System	18	
Ret	32	(United Kingdom) Peter Collins	Maserati	22	Suspension	11	
Ret	42	(United States) Harry Schell	Vanwall	7	Suspension	13	
Ret	24	(France) Jean Lucas	Gordini	7	Engine	22	
Ret	44	(United Kingdom) Ken Wharton	Vanwall	0	Injection	17	
DNS	2	(Italy) Nino Farina	Lancia		Tyre	5	
DNS	10	(Italy) Luigi Villoresi	Lancia		Tyre	8	
DNS	46	(Italy) Luigi Piotti	Arzani-Volpini-Maserati		Engine		

Notes

- ^1 – 1 point for fastest lap

== Final Championship standings ==
- **Bold text** indicates the World Champion.

Drivers' Championship standings

	Pos	Driver	Points
	1	(Argentina) **Juan Manuel Fangio**	40 (41)
	2	(United Kingdom) Stirling Moss	23
3	3	(Italy) Eugenio Castellotti	12
1	4	(France) Maurice Trintignant	11 1/3
1	5	(Italy) Nino Farina	10 1/3

- Note: Only the top five positions are included. Only the best 5 results counted towards the Championship. Numbers without parentheses are Championship points; numbers in parentheses are total points scored.

Previous race: 1955 British Grand Prix	FIA Formula One World Championship; 1955 season	Next race: 1956 Argentine Grand Prix
Previous race: 1954 Italian Grand Prix	Italian Grand Prix	Next race: 1956 Italian Grand Prix
