= 1953 Dutch Grand Prix =

← Previous race	Next race →
- Zandvoort original layout

Race details
- Date: 7 June 1953
- Official name: IV Grote Prijs van Nederland
- Location: Circuit Park Zandvoort, Zandvoort, Netherlands
- Course: Permanent racing facility
- Course length: 4.193 km (2.605 miles)
- Distance: 90 laps, 377.370 km (234.488 miles)
- Weather: Sunny, mild, dry

Pole position
Driver	(Italy) Alberto Ascari	Ferrari
- Time: 1:51.1

Fastest lap
Driver	(Italy) Luigi Villoresi	Ferrari
- Time: 1:52.8 on lap 59

Podium
First	(Italy) Alberto Ascari	Ferrari
Second	(Italy) Nino Farina	Ferrari
Third	(Argentina) José Froilán González; (Italy) Felice Bonetto	Maserati

The 1953 Dutch Grand Prix was a Formula Two race held on 7 June 1953 at the Circuit Zandvoort. It was race 3 of 9 in the 1953 World Championship of Drivers, which was run to Formula Two rules in 1952 and 1953, rather than the Formula One regulations normally used. The 90-lap race was won by Ferrari driver Alberto Ascari after he started from pole position. His teammate Nino Farina finished second and Maserati drivers José Froilán González and Felice Bonetto came in third

== Race report ==
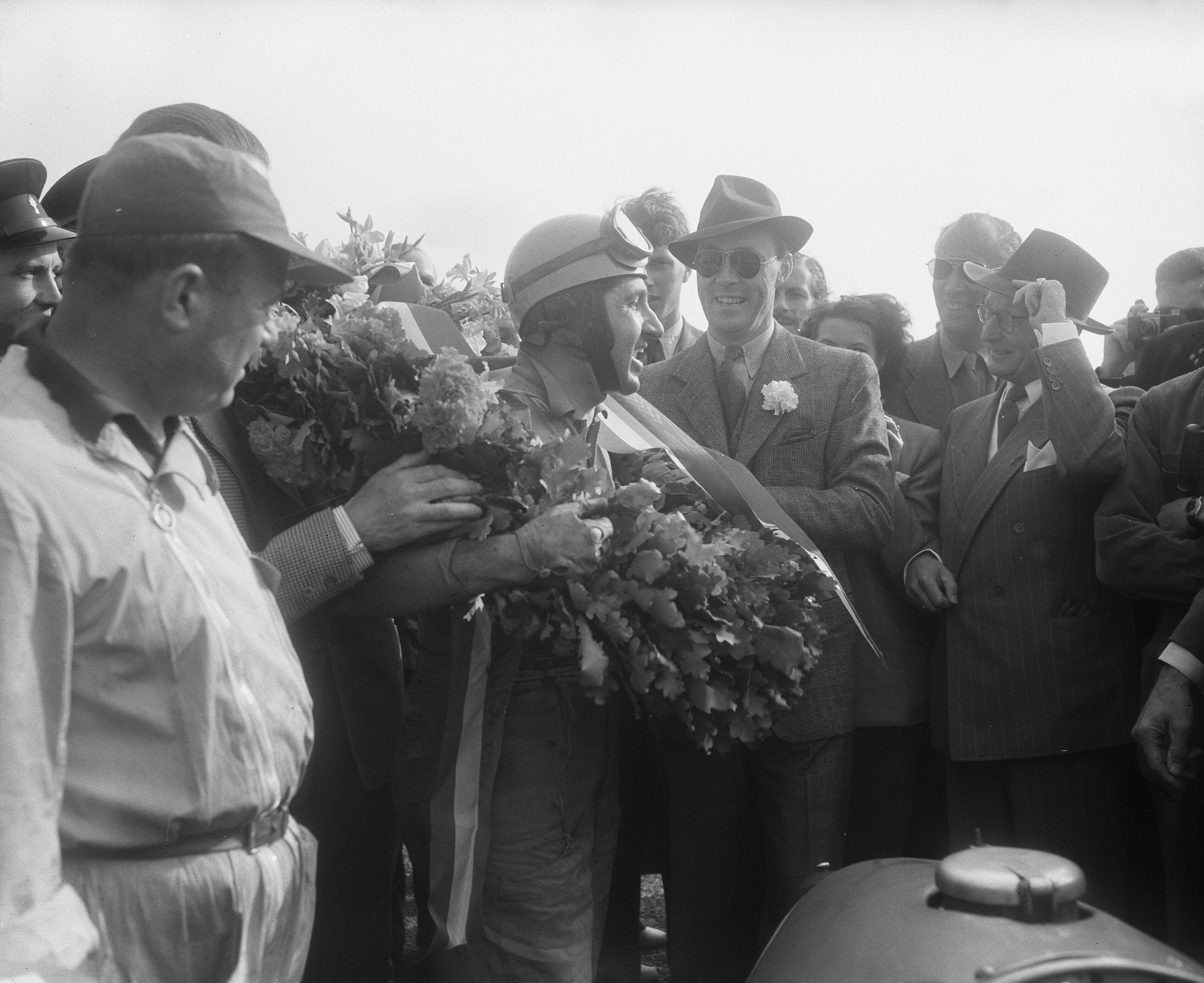
Ascari after winning the Grand Prix with Prince Bernhard of Lippe-Biesterfeld to his left.

The Dutch Grand Prix, which had been held in August the previous year, moved to an earlier June calendar slot in 1953. Ferrari retained the same four drivers who had competed at Buenos Aires—Alberto Ascari, Luigi Villoresi, Nino Farina and Mike Hawthorn—while there was also a privateer Ferrari for Frenchman Louis Rosier. The Scuderia's most significant competition came from the Maserati team, who came to Zandvoort with three of their four drivers from the Argentine Grand Prix: Juan Manuel Fangio, José Froilán González and Felice Bonetto. Swiss driver Toulo de Graffenried raced in a privateer Maserati for Enrico Platé's team. Gordini also entered three cars for this event, with Maurice Trintignant and Harry Schell (who had shared Trintignant's car at Buenos Aires) being retained from their lineup for Argentina. Roberto Mieres made his Grand Prix debut in the team's third car. The Connaught works team retained Kenneth McAlpine and Stirling Moss from their lineup for the previous European race, the Italian Grand Prix, while fellow British driver Roy Salvadori also drove for the team, and Johnny Claes entered a privateer Connaught. HWM also stuck with the drivers who had competed for them in Monza—Peter Collins and Lance Macklin—while Ken Wharton completed the field in his privateer Cooper-Bristol.

Ascari took his fifth consecutive pole position (excluding the Indy 500, in which none of the European teams competed), and he was joined on the front row by Fangio in his Maserati and the second Ferrari of Farina. Villoresi in the third Ferrari started from the second row, alongside the Maserati of González, while the third row consisted of Hawthorn in the remaining works Ferrari and a pair of privateers—de Graffenried in a Maserati and Rosier in his Ferrari. The final works Maserati of Bonetto could only manage to qualify on the fifth row of the grid, starting from thirteenth.

The race was held in very difficult conditions – the track was made slippery by loose grit. The Ferraris had better road holding and once again Alberto Ascari led from start to finish, while the main competition for second place was between his teammates Farina and Villoresi. Farina ultimately finished second, while Villoresi, who took the point for fastest lap, was forced to retire with a throttle issue. A problem with his suspension forced González to retire. Three laps later, however, he took over his teammate Felice Bonetto's car and ran out the winner of an exciting duel with Mike Hawthorn, once again depriving Ferrari of a 1-2-3. González and Bonetto shared the four points for third place. Fangio retired with a broken back axle, having been in fourth behind the leading Ferrari trio at the time. Toulo de Graffenried took the final points position in fifth, his first points since the 1951 Swiss Grand Prix.

Ascari's eighth consecutive World Championship race victory (ignoring the Indianapolis 500) gave him a clear lead in the points standings. He was eight points clear of Bill Vukovich, the winner at Indianapolis, while his nearest genuine rivals for the Drivers' Championship were his teammates Villoresi and Farina, who were in third and fourth, respectively. González and Hawthorn were level on points with Farina, eleven points adrift of Ascari.

== Entries ==
No	Driver	Entrant	Constructor	Chassis	Engine	Tyre
2	(Italy) Alberto Ascari	Scuderia Ferrari	Ferrari	Ferrari 500	Ferrari Type 500 2.0 L4	P
4	(Italy) Luigi Villoresi	Scuderia Ferrari	Ferrari	Ferrari 500	Ferrari Type 500 2.0 L4	P
6	(Italy) Nino Farina	Scuderia Ferrari	Ferrari	Ferrari 500	Ferrari Type 500 2.0 L4	P
8	(United Kingdom) Mike Hawthorn	Scuderia Ferrari	Ferrari	Ferrari 500	Ferrari Type 500 2.0 L4	P
10	(France) Louis Rosier	Ecurie Rosier	Ferrari	Ferrari 500	Ferrari Type 500 2.0 L4	D
12	(Argentina) Juan Manuel Fangio	Officine Alfieri Maserati	Maserati	Maserati A6GCM-53	Maserati A6G 2.0 L6	P
14	(Argentina) José Froilán González	Officine Alfieri Maserati	Maserati	Maserati A6GCM-53	Maserati A6G 2.0 L6	P
16	(Italy) Felice Bonetto^{1}	Officine Alfieri Maserati	Maserati	Maserati A6GCM-53	Maserati A6G 2.0 L6	P
18	(Switzerland) Toulo de Graffenried	Enrico Platé	Maserati	Maserati A6GCM-53	Maserati A6G 2.0 L6	P
20	(United States) Harry Schell	Equipe Gordini	Gordini	Gordini T16	Gordini 20 2.0 L6	E
22	(Argentina) Roberto Mieres^{2}	Equipe Gordini	Gordini	Gordini T16	Gordini 20 2.0 L6	E
24	(France) Maurice Trintignant	Equipe Gordini	Gordini	Gordini T16	Gordini 20 2.0 L6	E
26	(United Kingdom) Roy Salvadori	Connaught Engineering	Connaught-Lea Francis	Connaught A	Lea Francis 2.0 L4	D
28	(United Kingdom) Kenneth McAlpine	Connaught Engineering	Connaught-Lea Francis	Connaught A	Lea Francis 2.0 L4	D
30	(Belgium) Johnny Claes	Ecurie Belge	Connaught-Lea Francis	Connaught A	Lea Francis 2.0 L4	E
32	(United Kingdom) Ken Wharton	Ken Wharton	Cooper-Bristol	Cooper T23	Bristol BS1 2.0 L6	D
34	(United Kingdom) Stirling Moss	Connaught Engineering	Connaught-Lea Francis	Connaught A	Lea Francis 2.0 L4	D
36	(United Kingdom) Peter Collins	HW Motors	HWM-Alta	HWM 53	Alta F2 2.0 L4	D
38	(United Kingdom) Lance Macklin	HW Motors	HWM-Alta	HWM 53	Alta F2 2.0 L4	D
40	(United States) Fred Wacker^{3}	Equipe Gordini	Gordini	Gordini T16	Gordini 20 2.0 L6	E

^1 — Felice Bonetto qualified and drove 25 laps of the race in the #16 Maserati. José Froilán González, whose own car had already retired, took over the car for the remainder of the race.
^2 — Jean Behra was initially due to drive the #22 Gordini, but, due to injuries suffered at the non-championship Pau Grand Prix, he was unable to participate, and so was replaced by Roberto Mieres.
^3 — Fred Wacker neither set a qualifying time nor started the race, as his engine was used by Harry Schell.

== Classification ==
=== Qualifying ===
Pos	No	Driver	Constructor	Time	Gap
1	2	(Italy) Alberto Ascari	Ferrari	1:51.1	—
2	12	(Argentina) Juan Manuel Fangio	Maserati	1:52.7	+1.6
3	6	(Italy) Nino Farina	Ferrari	1:53.0	+1.9
4	4	(Italy) Luigi Villoresi	Ferrari	1:53.7	+2.6
5	14	(Argentina) José Froilán González	Maserati	1:54.1	+3.0
6	8	(United Kingdom) Mike Hawthorn	Ferrari	1:54.9	+3.8
7	18	(Switzerland) Toulo de Graffenried	Maserati	1:58.7	+7.6
8	10	(France) Louis Rosier	Ferrari	1:59.5	+8.4
9	34	(United Kingdom) Stirling Moss	Connaught-Lea-Francis	2:00.0	+8.9
10	20	(United States) Harry Schell	Gordini	2:00.1	+9.0
11	26	(United Kingdom) Roy Salvadori	Connaught-Lea-Francis	2:00.5	+9.4
12	24	(France) Maurice Trintignant	Gordini	2:01.2	+10.1
13	16	(Italy) Felice Bonetto	Maserati	2:01.5	+10.4
14	28	(United Kingdom) Kenneth McAlpine	Connaught-Lea-Francis	2:01.9	+10.8
15	38	(United Kingdom) Lance Macklin	HWM-Alta	2:02.4	+11.3
16	36	(United Kingdom) Peter Collins	HWM-Alta	2:03.1	+12.0
17	30	(Belgium) Johnny Claes	Connaught-Lea-Francis	2:03.9	+12.8
18	32	(United Kingdom) Ken Wharton	Cooper-Bristol	2:06.4	+15.3
19	22	(Argentina) Roberto Mieres	Gordini	2:08.5	+17.4
20	40	(United States) Fred Wacker	Gordini	No time	—

=== Race ===
Pos	No	Driver	Constructor	Laps	Time/Retired	Grid	Points
1	2	(Italy) Alberto Ascari	Ferrari	90	2:53:35.8	1	8
2	6	(Italy) Nino Farina	Ferrari	90	+ 10.4	3	6
3	16	(Italy) Felice Bonetto (Argentina) José Froilán González	Maserati	89	+ 1 Lap	13	2; 2
4	8	(United Kingdom) Mike Hawthorn	Ferrari	89	+ 1 Lap	6	3
5	18	(Switzerland) Toulo de Graffenried	Maserati	88	+ 2 Laps	7	2
6	24	(France) Maurice Trintignant	Gordini	87	+ 3 Laps	12	
7	10	(France) Louis Rosier	Ferrari	86	+ 4 Laps	8	
8	36	(United Kingdom) Peter Collins	HWM-Alta	84	+ 6 Laps	16	
9	34	(United Kingdom) Stirling Moss	Connaught-Lea-Francis	83	+ 7 Laps	9	
Ret	4	(Italy) Luigi Villoresi	Ferrari	67	Throttle	4	1^{1}
Ret	28	(United Kingdom) Kenneth McAlpine	Connaught-Lea-Francis	63	Engine	14	
Ret	20	(United States) Harry Schell	Gordini	59	Transmission	10	
NC	30	(Belgium) Johnny Claes	Connaught-Lea-Francis	52	Not Classified	17	
Ret	12	(Argentina) Juan Manuel Fangio	Maserati	36	Axle	2	
Ret	22	(Argentina) Roberto Mieres	Gordini	28	Transmission	19	
Ret	14	(Argentina) José Froilán González	Maserati	22	Rear Axle	5	
Ret	32	(United Kingdom) Ken Wharton	Cooper-Bristol	19	Physical	18	
Ret	26	(United Kingdom) Roy Salvadori	Connaught-Lea-Francis	14	Engine	11	
Ret	38	(United Kingdom) Lance Macklin	HWM-Alta	7	Throttle	15	
DNS	40	(United States) Fred Wacker	Gordini	0	Did not start		

Notes

- ^1 – 1 point for fastest lap

== Shared drives ==
- Car #16: Felice Bonetto (25 laps) and José Froilán González (64 laps). They shared the points for 3rd place.

== Championship standings after the race ==
Drivers' Championship standings

	Pos	Driver	Points
	1	(Italy) Alberto Ascari	17
	2	(United States) Bill Vukovich	9
	3	(Italy) Luigi Villoresi	7
26	4	(Italy) Nino Farina	6
1	5	(United States) Art Cross	6

- Note: Only the top five positions are included.

Previous race: 1953 Indianapolis 500	FIA Formula One World Championship; 1953 season	Next race: 1953 Belgian Grand Prix
Previous race: 1952 Dutch Grand Prix	Dutch Grand Prix	Next race: 1955 Dutch Grand Prix
