= Gordini T16 =

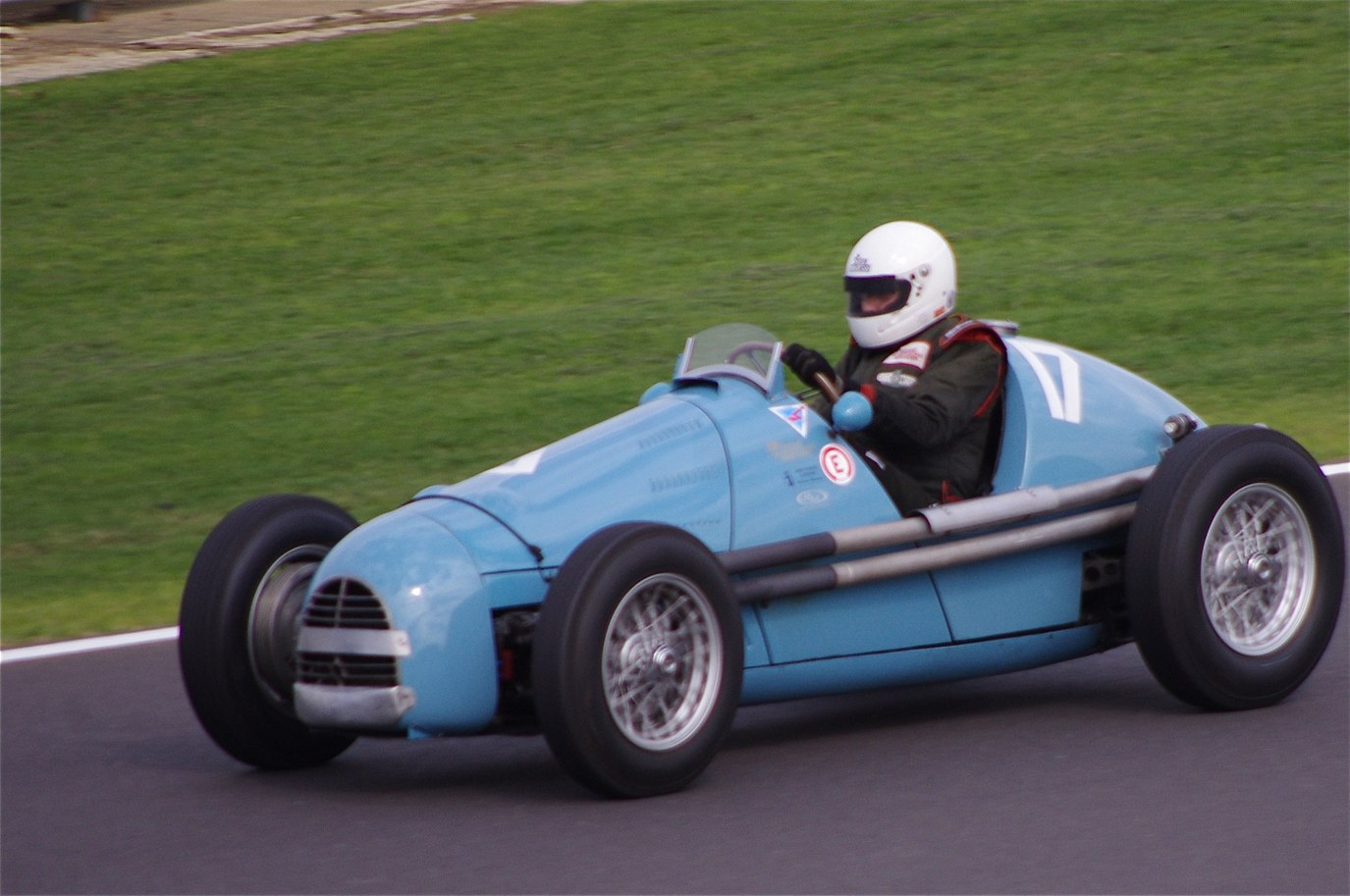
- Category: Formula One; Formula Two
- Constructor: Gordini

Technical specifications
- Chassis: Steel tubular spaceframe, aluminum body
- Suspension (front): Double wishbones, independent with torsion bar springs, Messier shock absorbers, anti-roll bar
- Suspension (rear): Rear rigid live axle, Watts linkage, Messier hydraulic shock absorbers, trailing arms, anti-roll bar
- Engine: 2.0–2.3 L (122.0–140.4 cu in) DOHC L6 naturally-aspirated mid-engined
- Transmission: 4-speed manual
- Power: 175 hp (130 kW) at 7000 rpm
- Weight: 680–780 kg (1,499–1,720 lb)
- Brakes: Drum brakes

Competition history
- Debut: 1952 Swiss Grand Prix

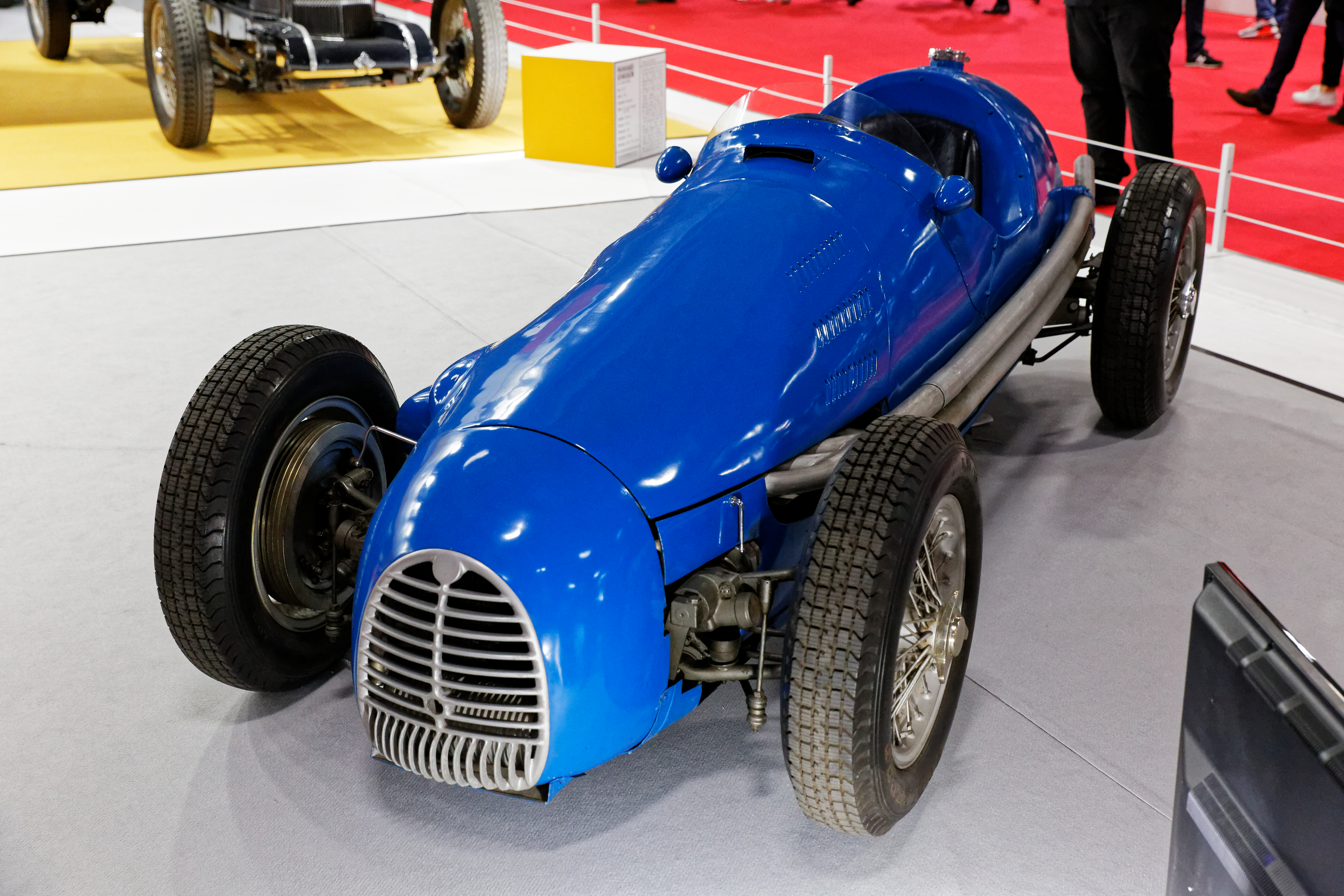
1952 Gordini T16

The Gordini T16, also known as Gordini Type 16, is an open-wheel race car, designed, developed and built by French manufacturer Gordini, for Formula One and Formula Two racing categories, between 1952 and 1956.
