= Eugenio Castellotti =

Italian racing driver (1930–1957)

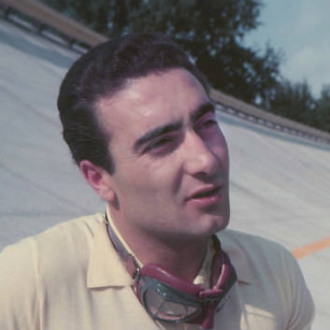
- Castellotti c. 1956
- Born: 10 October 1930; Lodi, Lombardy, Kingdom of Italy
- Died: 14 March 1957 (aged 26); Aerautodromo di Modena, Emilia-Romagna, Italy
- Cause of death: Single vehicle collision whilst testing the Ferrari 801
- Partners: Delia Scala (eng. 1956)

Formula One World Championship career
- Nationality: (Italy) Italian
- Active years: 1955–1957
- Team(s): Lancia, Ferrari
- Entries: 14
- Championships: 0
- Wins: 0
- Podiums: 3
- Career points: 19.5
- Pole positions: 1
- Fastest laps: 0
- First entry: 1955 Argentine Grand Prix
- Last entry: 1957 Argentine Grand Prix

Eugenio Castellotti (Italian pronunciation: [euˈdʒɛːnjo kastelˈlɔtti]; 10 October 1930 – 14 March 1957) was an Italian racing driver, who competed in Formula One at 14 Grands Prix from 1955 to 1957. Nicknamed "il Bello", (Note: lit. 'the Beautiful') Castellotti won the Mille Miglia and 12 Hours of Sebring, both in 1956 with Ferrari.

Born and raised in Lombardy, Castellotti began his career in sportscar racing aged 20, driving a Ferrari 166. He took his first major victory at the Portuguese Grand Prix in 1952. The following year, he won the 10 Hours of Messina; he took further podiums in sportscars at the Bari and Monaco Grands Prix in 1952, as well as the Carrera Panamericana in 1953. Castellotti debuted in Formula One with Lancia in 1955, taking his maiden podium in Monaco and becoming the then-youngest polesitter in Formula One history in Belgium, aged 24.

Castellotti contested the final three rounds of 1955 with Ferrari, taking a podium at the Italian Grand Prix to clinch third in the World Drivers' Championship. He retained his seat in 1956, securing his third career podium at the French Grand Prix. Amongst his Formula One duties, he continued his sportscar career, winning the 12 Hours of Sebring alongside Juan Manuel Fangio, as well as the Mille Miglia in a 290 MM. Remaining with Ferrari for his 1957 campaign, he won the 1000 km Buenos Aires. In March 1957, Castellotti died following an accident whilst testing the Ferrari 801 at Modena.

== Driving career ==
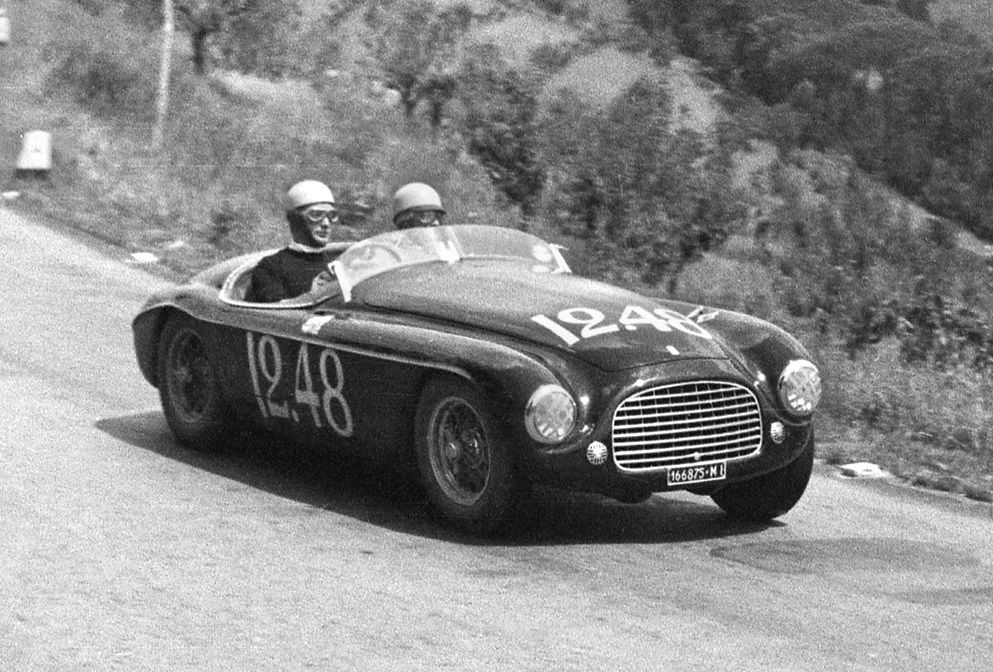
Eugenio Castellotti in his 1950 Ferrari 166 MM Touring Barchetta s/n 0058M with co-driver Sandro Matranga at Coppa della Toscana on 3 June 1951 as entry #12.48 where they ended in 8th place overall.

Castellotti was born in Lodi, Italy. He acquired a Ferrari 166 MM s/n 0058M at the age of twenty, from a local benefactor, and began racing sports cars. In 1952, he won the Portuguese Grand Prix, was third at Bari and second at Monaco which was run that year for sports cars. In 1953, he won the 10 Hours of Messina and finished third in the Carrera Panamericana in Mexico. In 1954, he signed for Lancia and again drove sports cars whilst awaiting the team's Grand Prix car. He eventually made his Grand Prix debut at Buenos Aires on 16 January 1955, for Lancia, but struggled in the warmer temperatures and crashed. However, he finished second at Monaco, but in mid-season the team amalgamated with Scuderia Ferrari, for whom Castellotti drove for the remainder of his career. He participated in 14 World Championship Grands Prix, achieving 3 podiums and scored a total of 19.5 championship points. He secured pole position, with Lancia, at the 1955 Belgian Grand Prix, becoming the youngest driver to do so (at age 24 years, seven months and 26 days), a record that stood for 13 years until Jacky Ickx's pole position at the 1968 German Grand Prix.

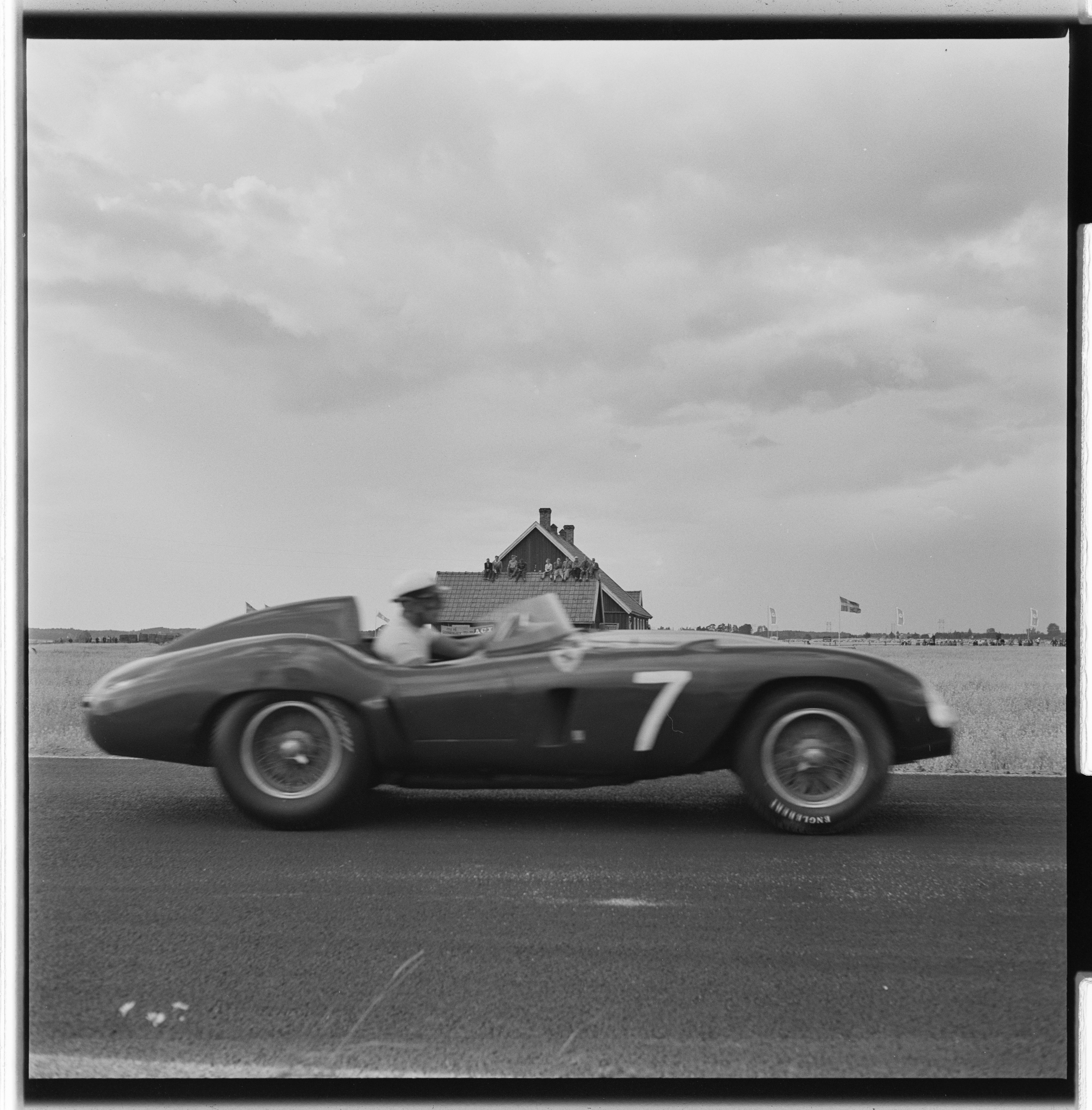
Castellotti in the Ferrari 121 LM s/n 0558LM at the Swedish Grand Prix on 7 August 1955, where he got third place overall.

Castellotti also participated in several non-Championship Formula One races. Castellotti won the March 1956 12 Hours of Sebring at Sebring, Florida partnered with Fangio. He followed this triumph by winning the Mille Miglia race in Brescia and the Grand Prix for sports cars in Rouen, France. Castellotti's Ferrari achieved a total race time of 2 hours 10 minutes 31.1 seconds, winning the race. He was also second in the Nürburgring 1000 km race again partnered with Fangio.

== Private life ==
Known for his sophisticated manners and tailored clothes, Castellotti had significantly prominent media profile in Italy for his relationship with ballerina and actress Delia Scala. Castellotti and Scala were officially engaged at the time of his death.

== Death ==
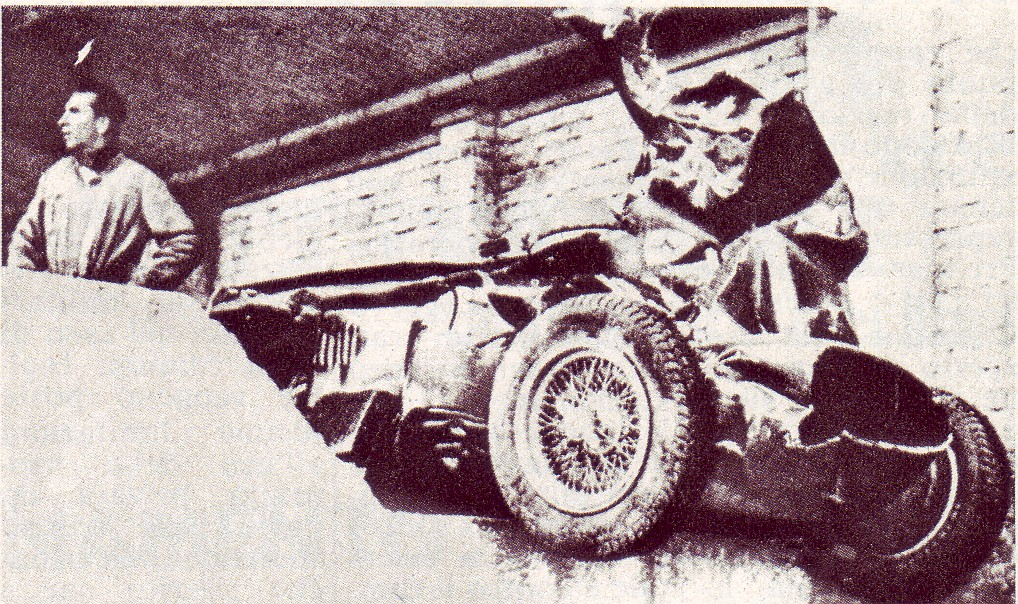
Remains of the Ferrari 801 that Castellotti drove in the fatal accident at Modena on 14 March 1957.

Castellotti died at 26 years old during a private Ferrari test session at the Aerautodromo di Modena. Castellotti was testing a new Ferrari Grand Prix car for the 1957 season. He had been told by Enzo Ferrari in person to test there and set a fast time, in order to beat an unofficial lap record that had just been set by Jean Behra for Maserati. He hit a high kerb at a chicane and was thrown out of the car; his body was hurled 100 yards (91.4 m). The car repeatedly overturned before coming to rest in the members' stand. No other people were hurt. According to physicians, Castellotti's skull fracture caused his instant death.

== Legacy ==
Castellotti was considered the greatest Italian driver since Alberto Ascari. In 1958, Castellotti's friend Giuseppe Corsi founded Scuderia Castellotti in Lodi to honour his memory. The team used modified Ferrari Tipo 553 2.0-litre engines bored out to 2.5 litres and rebranded as "Castellotti", with "Eugenio" on the cam covers. The team folded in 1961 after driver Giulio Cabianca fatally crashed in the same autodrome where Castellotti had his accident. Castellotti's legacy has been honoured by Club Auto Moto Storiche Castellotti in Lodi.

Major career wins (sportscars):

- 1952: Coppa d'Oro di Sicilia
- 1952: Portuguese Grand Prix
- 1953: 10 Hours of Messina
- 1953: Circuito di Senigallia
- 1956: Mille Miglia
- 1956: 12 Hours of Sebring
- 1957: 1000 km Buenos Aires

== Racing record ==
=== Complete Formula One World Championship results ===
(key) (Races in bold indicate pole position)

Year	Team	Chassis	Engine	1	2	3	4	5	6	7	8	WDC	Points
1955	Scuderia Lancia	Lancia D50	Lancia DS50 2.5 V8	ARG; Ret	MON; 2	500	**BEL**; Ret					**3rd**	**12**
1955	Scuderia Ferrari	Ferrari 625	Ferrari 107 2.5 L4						GBR; 6			**3rd**	**12**
1955	Scuderia Ferrari	Ferrari 555	Ferrari 106 2.5 L4					NED; 5		ITA; 3		**3rd**	**12**
1956	Scuderia Ferrari	Lancia Ferrari D50	Lancia Ferrari DS50 2.5 V8	ARG; Ret	MON; 4	500	BEL; Ret	FRA; 2	GBR; 10	GER; Ret	ITA; 8	6th	7.5
1957	Scuderia Ferrari	Ferrari 801	Lancia Ferrari DS50 2.5 V8	ARG; Ret	MON	500	FRA	GBR	GER	PES	ITA	NC	0

=== Non-championship results ===
(key) (Races in bold indicate pole position) (Races in italics indicate fastest lap)

Year	Entrant	Chassis	Engine	1	2	3	4	5	6	7	8	9	10	11	12	13	14	15	16	17	18
1955	Scuderia Lancia	Lancia D50	Lancia V8	NZL	BUE	VAL; 4	PAU; 2	GLO	BOR	INT	NAP	ALB	CUR	COR	LON	DAR	RED	DAT			
1955	Scuderia Ferrari	Lancia D50	Lancia V8																OUT; 7	AVO	SYR
1956	Scuderia Ferrari	Lancia D50	Lancia V8	BUE; Ret	GLV	SYR; Ret	AIN	INT	**NAP**; Ret	100	VNW	CAE	SUS	BRH							
1957	Scuderia Ferrari	Lancia D50	Lancia V8	BUE; 5	SYR	PAU	GLV	NAP	RMS	CAE	INT	MOD	MOR								

† Indicates shared drive with Luigi Musso

== Notes ==
Preceded by Bill Vukovich	Formula One fatal accidents 14 March 1957	Succeeded by Keith Andrews
Records
Preceded by Jerry Hoyt; 26 years, 121 days (1955 Indianapolis 500)	Youngest Grand Prix polesitter 24 years, 238 days (1955 Belgian Grand Prix)	Succeeded by Jacky Ickx; 23 years, 216 days (1968 German GP)
