= Olivier Gendebien =

Belgian racing driver (1924–1998)

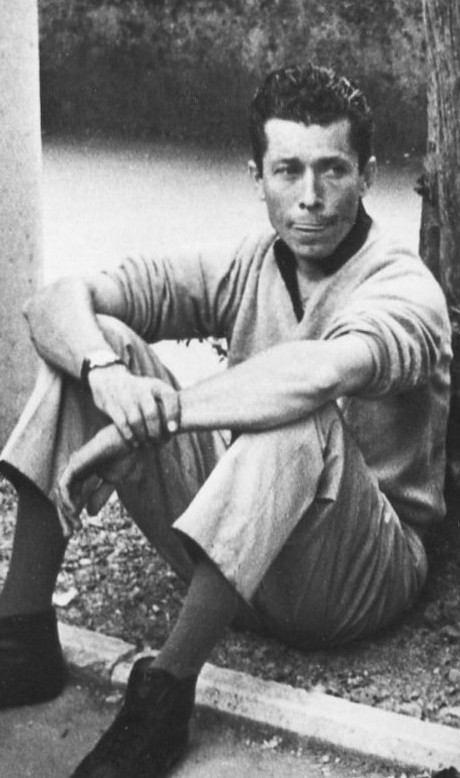
- Gendebien c. 1961
- Born: Olivier Jean Marie Fernand Gendebien; 12 January 1924; Brussels, Belgium
- Died: 2 October 1998 (aged 74); Les Baux-de-Provence, Bouches-du-Rhône, France

Formula One World Championship career
- Nationality: (Belgium) Belgian
- Active years: 1956, 1958–1961
- Team(s): ENB, Ferrari, BRP
- Entries: 15 (14 starts)
- Championships: 0
- Wins: 0
- Podiums: 2
- Career points: 18
- Pole positions: 0
- Fastest laps: 0
- First entry: 1956 Argentine Grand Prix
- Last entry: 1961 United States Grand Prix

World Sportscar Championship career
- Years active: 1953–1962
- Teams: Jaguar, Panhard, Francorchamps, Mercedes, ENB, Ferrari, Bonnier, Porsche, Serenissima, NART
- Starts: 41
- Wins: 11
- Podiums: 23
- Poles: 1 (Note: Until the mid-1960s, grid positions at the majority of World Sportscar Championship events were determined by engine capacity.)
- Fastest laps: 4

24 Hours of Le Mans career
- Years: 1955–1962
- Teams: ENB, Ferrari
- Best finish: 1st (1958, 1960, 1961, 1962)
- Class wins: 4 (1958, 1960, 1961, 1962)

Olivier Jean Marie Fernand Gendebien (French pronunciation: [ɔlivje ʒɑ̃dəbjɛ̃]; 12 January 1924 – 2 October 1998) was a Belgian racing driver, who competed in Formula One from 1956 to 1961. Widely regarded as one of the greatest drivers in the history of sportscar racing, (Note: Per several sources:) Gendebien was a four-time winner of the 24 Hours of Le Mans with Ferrari, a three-time winner of the 12 Hours of Sebring, and a three-time winner of the Targa Florio.

Born and raised in Brussels, Gendebien was initially a forester in the Belgian Congo before moving back to Europe in 1952, where he began his career in rallying. He won his first event driving an Alfa Romeo 1900 TI at the Tulip Rally in 1954. Gendebien added to his successes by winning the Liège–Rome–Liège Rally, Dolomites Gold Cup Race and Rally Stella Alpina in 1955, driving a Mercedes-Benz 300 SL. Attracting the attention of Enzo Ferrari, Gendebien signed for Ferrari in 1956 to compete in Formula One and sportscars, making his debut in the former at the Argentine Grand Prix. (Note: Gendebien had entered the 1955 Belgian Grand Prix with ENB, but did not attend.)

Gendebien was appointed to the Order of the Crown of Belgium by Albert II in 1998.

== Rally racer ==
Gendebien spent some years in the Belgian Congo. On his return to Europe he teamed up with Fraikin to compete in the 1952 Liège–Rome–Liège Rally using a Jaguar Mk VII saloon car. Together with Pierre Stasse, Gendebien won the sixth running of the Tulip Rally in Zandvoort in April 1954. Their car was an Alfa Romeo 1900 TI. The Gendebien and Fraiken partnership gained the nickname "the eternal bridesmaids", owing to their number of second-place finishes, but after two previous attempts they triumphed in the Liège–Rome–Liège Rally, the Coppa d'Oro delle Dolomiti and Rally Stella Alpina in 1955, driving a Mercedes-Benz 300SL. In 1956 Olivier Gendebien and Pierre Stasse finished in third place driving a Ferrari 250 GT Europa (Nr 0373).

== Formula One driver ==
Gendebien's success in rally competitions brought him to the attention of Enzo Ferrari, who offered him a contract to drive a Ferrari in sports car events and selected Grands Prix. Much respected as a true gentleman by everyone who knew him, he remained a member of the Ferrari team until he retired from racing. Enzo Ferrari summed him up as "a gentleman who never forgets that noblesse oblige and, when he is at the wheel, he translates this code of behaviour into an elegant and discerning forcefulness."

During his career, Gendebien competed in only 15 Formula One races as most of the time he was Ferrari's spare driver, filling in only occasionally. He nonetheless scored points in five races, and was only one place away from a points-scoring finish on a further two occasions.

Gendebien made his début at the 1956 Argentine Grand Prix, with the Ferrari team, but it was during a stint driving for the British Racing Partnership's Yeoman Credit Racing team in 1960 that Gendebien scored his best finishes; he took second in the 1960 French Grand Prix and third in front of a home crowd at the 1960 Belgian Grand Prix.

The second of these was a somewhat bitter-sweet success, as Gendebien's team-mate at the time, Chris Bristow, was killed in an accident during the race. Gendebien himself walked away with slight injuries in October 1961 after his Lotus-Climax failed to negotiate a turn during practice for the 1961 United States Grand Prix at Watkins Glen, New York. The car flipped over and Gendebien's shoes were torn off by the impact.

== Sports car competition ==
However, it was in sports car racing, particularly the long distance and endurance events, where Gendebien excelled. Piloting a 2.5-litre Ferrari, Gendebien teamed up with Maurice Trintignant to place third in the 1956 24 Hours of Le Mans. They were seven laps behind the winners, privateer Ecurie Ecosse Jaguar drivers Ron Flockhart and Ninian Sanderson. The 1958 Grand Prix of Buenos Aires was a 1,000 kilometre event in which Gendebien paired with Wolfgang von Trips. They finished second to a fellow Ferrari pairing Phil Hill and Peter Collins. In the race Argentine Maserati driver, Jorge Magnasco, died after his car skidded and turned over.

The same year, Gendebien partnered Hill and won the prestigious 24 Hours of Le Mans. Their victory came in a 3-litre Ferrari and secured the World Sportscar Championship for the Ferrari factory. They covered 2,511 miles with an average speed of 107 miles per hour. Hill became the first American to win the event and their Ferrari was the sole factory-sponsored car running at the end. Ferrari drivers took the first three positions at the conclusion of the 1961 24 Hours of Le Mans and, as they were to be again the following year, Hill and Gendebien were first, averaging 115.89 miles per hour, and establishing a race record. The duo were a natural fit and together they won the Le Mans race three times in total, with Gendebien winning it a fourth time, partnered by fellow Belgian Paul Frère in 1960. Gendebien's record number of Le Mans victories was not exceeded until 1981, when fellow-Belgian Jacky Ickx won for the fifth time.

Away from Circuit de la Sarthe, Gendebien also triumphed in the Targa Florio (1958, '61, '62), the 12 Hours of Sebring (1959, '60, '61), the 12 Hours of Reims (1957, '58) and the 1000 km Nürburgring (1962). When asked about the key to winning as a race car driver, Gendebien responded: "It is a matter of taking the corners a little faster than one would want." In honour of Gendebien's three wins at the 12 Hours of Sebring, turn 15 just before the final corner, onto the Ullman straight is named after him. He also won the Dolomites Cup, a one-lap sportscar race that took place on a 188-mile circuit in the Dolomite Mountains in Italy.

=== Major race victories ===
- Tour of Sicily : 1957
- Tour de France Automobile : 1957, 1958, 1959
- Reims 12 Hours : 1957, 1958
- Targa Florio : 1958, 1961, 1962
- 12 Hours of Sebring : 1959, 1960, 1961
- 24 hours of Le Mans : 1958, 1960, 1961, 1962
- 1000km Nürburgring : 1962

== Post race life ==
Married with three children, Gendebien's wife pressured him to get out of the dangerous sport of automobile racing where more than two dozen of his competitors had died at the wheel. At 38 years of age, in 1962 Olivier Gendebien retired following his fourth victory at Le Mans. His wife Marie-Claire was killed in a car accident in April 1965, their son Robert receiving minor injuries. Independently wealthy, and an avid skier, tennis player, and equestrian rider, he devoted the rest of his life to running a variety of businesses. In 1998 King Albert II awarded him the Belgian Order of the Crown.

Olivier Gendebien died in 1998 at his home in Les Baux-de-Provence in southern France and is buried in Saint-Rémy-de-Provence Cemetery.

== Racing record ==
=== Complete Formula One World Championship results ===
(key)

Year	Entrant	Chassis	Engine	1	2	3	4	5	6	7	8	9	10	11	WDC	Pts.
1955	Equipe Nationale Belge	Ferrari 625	Ferrari Straight-4	ARG	MON	500	BEL; DNA	NED	GBR	ITA					NC	0
1956	Scuderia Ferrari	Ferrari 555	Ferrari L4	ARG; 5	MON	500	BEL								23rd	2
1956	Scuderia Ferrari	Lancia-Ferrari D50	Lancia V8					FRA; Ret	GBR; DNA	GER	ITA				23rd	2
1958	Scuderia Ferrari	Ferrari Dino 246	Ferrari V6	ARG	MON	NED	500	BEL; 6	FRA	GBR	GER	POR	ITA; Ret	MOR; Ret	NC	0
1959	Scuderia Ferrari	Ferrari Dino 246	Ferrari V6	MON	500	NED	FRA; 4	GBR	GER	POR	ITA; 6	USA			15th	3
1960	Scuderia Ferrari	Ferrari Dino 246	Ferrari V6	ARG; DNA	MON	500	NED								6th	10
1960	Yeoman Credit Racing Team	Cooper T51	Climax L4					BEL; 3	FRA; 2	GBR; 9	POR; 7	ITA	USA; 12		6th	10
1961	Equipe Nationale Belge	Emeryson Mk2	Maserati L4	MON; DNQ	NED										14th	3
1961	Scuderia Ferrari	Ferrari 156	Ferrari V6			BEL; 4	FRA	GBR	GER	ITA					14th	3
1961	UDT-Laystall Racing Team	Lotus 18/21	Climax L4								USA; 11				14th	3

=== Non-championship results ===
(key) (Races in bold indicate pole position) (Races in italics indicate fastest lap)

Year	Entrant	Chassis	Engine	1	2	3	4	5	6	7	8	9	10	11	12	13	14	15	16	17	18	19	20	21
1956	Scuderia Ferrari	Ferrari 555	Ferrari	BUE; 6	GLV	SYR	AIN	INT	NAP	100	VNW	CAE	SUS	BRH										
1957	Scuderia Ferrari	Lancia D50	Lancia V8	BUE	SYR	PAU	GLV	NAP	RMS; Ret	CAE	INT	MOD	MOR											
1961	Equipe Nationale Belge	Emeryson Mk2	Maserati L4	LOM	GLV	PAU; Ret	BRX; Ret	VIE	AIN	SYR	NAP	LON	SIL	SOL; DNA	KAN	DAN	MOD	FLG	OUL	LEW	VAL	RAN	NAT	RSA

=== Complete 24 Hours of Le Mans results ===
Year	Team	Co-Driver	Car	Class	Laps	Pos.	Class Pos.
1955	(Belgium) Ecurie Belge	(Germany) Wolfgang Seidel	Porsche 550 RS Spyder	S 1.5	276	5th	2nd
1956	(Italy) Scuderia Ferrari	(France) Maurice Trintignant	Ferrari 625 LM	S 3.0	374	**3rd**	2nd
1957	(Italy) Scuderia Ferrari	(France) Maurice Trintignant	Ferrari 250 TR	S 5.0	109	DNF (Piston)	
1958	(Italy) Scuderia Ferrari	(United States) Phil Hill	Ferrari 250 TR/58	S 3.0	305	**1st**	1st
1959	(Italy) Scuderia Ferrari	(United States) Phil Hill	Ferrari 250 TR/59	S 3.0	263	DNF (Overheating)	
1960	(Italy) Scuderia Ferrari	(Belgium) Paul Frère	Ferrari 250 TR/59/60	S 3.0	314	**1st**	1st
1961	(Italy) SEFAC Ferrari	(United States) Phil Hill	Ferrari 250 TRI/61	S 3.0	333	**1st**	1st
1962	(Italy) SEFAC Ferrari	(United States) Phil Hill	Ferrari 330 TRI/LM	E +3.0	331	**1st**	1st

=== Complete 12 Hours of Sebring results ===
Year	Team	Co-Drivers	Car	Class	Laps	Pos.	Class Pos.
1957	(Italy) Scuderia Ferrari	(France) Maurice Trintignant	Ferrari 250 TR	S5.0	109	DNF (Piston)	
1958	(Italy) Scuderia Ferrari	(Italy) Luigi Musso	Ferrari 250 TR 58	S3.0	199	**2nd**	**2nd**
1959	(Italy) Scuderia Ferrari	(United States) Dan Gurney (United States) Phil Hill (United States) Chuck Daigh	Ferrari 250 TR 59	S3.0	188	**1st**	**1st**
1960	(Sweden) Joakim Bonnier	(West Germany) Hans Herrmann	Porsche 718 RS60	S1.6	196	**1st**	**1st**
1961	(Italy) Sefac Automobile Ferrari	(United States) Phil Hill	Ferrari 250 TRI/61	S3.0	210	**1st**	**1st**
1962	(United States) North American Racing Team	(United States) Phil Hill	Ferrari 250 GTO	GT3.0	196	**2nd**	**1st**

=== Complete 24 Hours of Daytona results ===
Year	Team	Co-Drivers	Car	Class	Laps	Pos.	Class Pos.
1962	(Italy) Scuderia Serenissima		Ferrari 250 GT SWB	GT3.0	75	16th	**3rd**

=== Complete 24 Hours of Spa results ===
Year	Team	Co-Drivers	Car	Class	Laps	Pos.	Class Pos.
1953		(Belgium) Roland du Roy de Blicky	Panhard Dyna	T		DNF	DNF

== Notes ==
Sporting positions
Preceded by Ron Flockhart; Ivor Bueb	Winner of the 24 Hours of Le Mans; 1958; With: Phil Hill	Succeeded by Carroll Shelby; Roy Salvadori
Preceded by Carroll Shelby; Roy Salvadori	Winner of the 24 Hours of Le Mans; 1960-1962; With: Paul Frère (1960) & Phil Hill (1961-62)	Succeeded by Ludovico Scarfiotti; Lorenzo Bandini
