= 1955 Naples Grand Prix =

- Non-championship race in the 1955 Formula One season
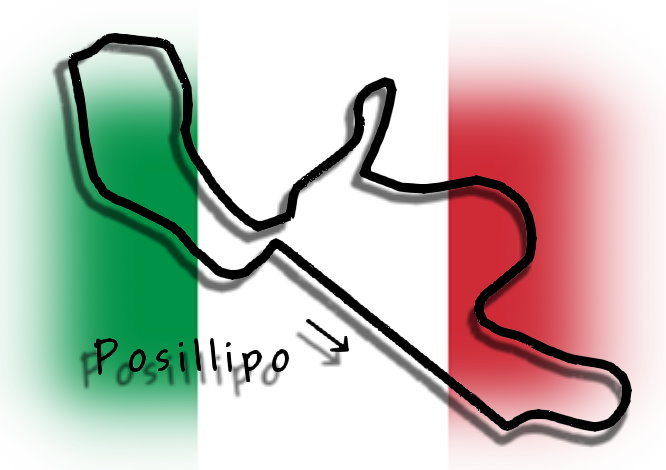

Race details
- Date: 8 May 1955
- Official name: VIII Gran Premio di Napoli
- Location: Posillipo Circuit, Posillipo, Naples
- Course: Street circuit
- Course length: 2.55 mi (4.10 km)
- Distance: 60 laps, 152.86 mi (246.00 km)

Pole position
| Driver | (Italy) Alberto Ascari | Lancia |
- Time: 2:08.1

Fastest lap
| Driver | (France) Jean Behra | Maserati |
- Time: 2:09.4

Podium
| First | (Italy) Alberto Ascari | Lancia |
| Second | (Italy) Luigi Musso | Maserati |
| Third | (Italy) Luigi Villoresi | Lancia |

The 8th Naples Grand Prix was a motor race, run to Formula One rules, held on 8 May 1955 at Posillipo Circuit, Naples. The race was run over 60 laps of the circuit, and was won by Italian driver Alberto Ascari in a Lancia D50.

== Results ==
| Pos | No. | Driver | Entrant | Constructor | Time/Position | Grid |
|---|---|---|---|---|---|---|
| 1 | 6 | (Italy) Alberto Ascari | Scuderia Lancia | Lancia D50 | 2:13:03.6 110.93 km/h | 1 |
| 2 | 16 | (Italy) Luigi Musso | Officine Alfieri Maserati | Maserati 250F | 2:14:20.6 (+77.0s) | 2 |
| 3 | 12 | (Italy) Luigi Villoresi | Scuderia Lancia | Lancia D50 | 59 laps | 4 |
| 4 | 2 | (France) Jean Behra | Officine Alfieri Maserati | Maserati 250F | 55 laps | 3 |
| 5 | 8 | (Italy) Giorgio Scarlatti | Giorgio Scarlatti | Ferrari 500 | 54 laps | 6 |
| 6 | 4 | (Italy) Berardo Taraschi | Berardo Taraschi | Ferrari 166 | 53 laps | 7 |
| 7 | 14 | (Switzerland) Ottorino Volonterio | Ottorino Volonterio | Maserati A6GCM | 47 laps | 9 |
| Ret. | 10 | (Argentina) Roberto Mieres | Officine Alfieri Maserati | Maserati 250F | 23 laps - oil leak | 5 |
| Ret. | 18 | (United Kingdom) Ted Whiteaway | E.N. Whiteaway | HWM-Alta | 17 laps - engine | 8 |

| Previous race: 1955 BRDC International Trophy | Formula One non-championship races 1955 season | Next race: 1956 Aintree 100 |
| Previous race: 1955 Albi Grand Prix | Naples Grand Prix | Next race: 1956 Naples Grand Prix |
