= 1956 Naples Grand Prix =

- Non-championship race in the 1956 Formula One season
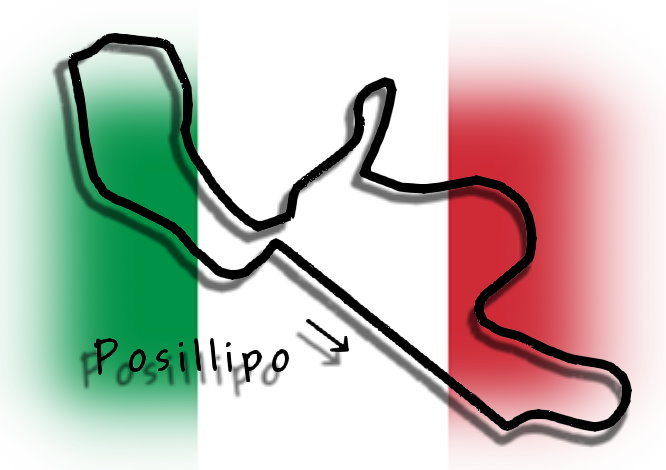

Race details
- Date: 6 May 1956
- Official name: IX Gran Premio di Napoli
- Location: Posillipo Circuit, Posillipo, Naples
- Course: Street circuit
- Course length: 4.10 km (2.55 mi)
- Distance: 60 laps, 246.02 km (152.87 mi)

Pole position
Driver	(Italy) Eugenio Castellotti	Ferrari
- Time: 2:07.7

Fastest lap
Driver	(Italy) Luigi Musso	Ferrari
- Time: 2:12.3

Podium
First	(France) Robert Manzon	Equipe Gordini
Second	(United Kingdom) Horace Gould	Gould's Garage (Bristol)
Third	(Italy) Gerino Gerini	Scuderia Guastalla

The 9th Naples Grand Prix was a motor race, run to Formula One rules, held on 6 May 1956 at Posillipo Circuit, Naples. The race was run over 60 laps of the circuit, and was won by French driver Robert Manzon in a Gordini Type 16.

== Results ==
Pos	Driver	Entrant	Constructor	Time/Position	Grid
1	(France) Robert Manzon	Equipe Gordini	Gordini Type 16	2:20:43.8, 104.89 km/h	3
2	(United Kingdom) Horace Gould	Gould's Garage (Bristol)	Maserati 250F	2:20:54.9 (+11.1s)	6
3	(Italy) Gerino Gerini	Scuderia Guastalla	Maserati 250F	57 laps	7
4	(Italy) Giorgio Scarlatti	Giorgio Scarlatti	Ferrari 500	56 laps	8
5	(Switzerland) Ottorino Volonterio	Ottorino Volonterio	Maserati 250F	49 laps	9
6	(Italy) Berardo Taraschi	Berardo Taraschi	Ferrari 166	45 laps	10
Ret.	(Italy) Luigi Musso	Scuderia Ferrari	Lancia-Ferrari D50	37 laps - engine	2
Ret.	(Spain) Paco Godia	Scuderia Centro Sud	Maserati 250F	36 laps - accident	5
Ret.	(Italy) Luigi Villoresi	Scuderia Centro Sud	Maserati 250F	21 laps - engine	4
Ret.	(Italy) Eugenio Castellotti	Scuderia Ferrari	Lancia-Ferrari D50	2 laps - oil pump	1

Previous race: 1956 BRDC International Trophy	Formula One non-championship races 1956 season	Next race: 1956 Aintree 100
Previous race: 1955 Naples Grand Prix	Naples Grand Prix	Next race: 1957 Naples Grand Prix
