= Stuart Lewis-Evans =

British racing driver (1930–1958)

- Lewis-Evans at the 1958 Italian Grand Prix
- Born: Stuart Nigel Lewis-Evans; 20 April 1930; Luton, Bedfordshire, England
- Died: 25 October 1958 (aged 28); East Grinstead, Sussex, England
- Cause of death: Injuries sustained at the 1958 Moroccan Grand Prix

Formula One World Championship career
- Nationality: (United Kingdom) British
- Active years: 1957–1958
- Team(s): Connaught, Vanwall
- Entries: 14
- Championships: 0
- Wins: 0
- Podiums: 2
- Career points: 16
- Pole positions: 2
- Fastest laps: 0
- First entry: 1957 Monaco Grand Prix
- Last entry: 1958 Moroccan Grand Prix

Stuart Nigel Lewis-Evans (20 April 1930 – 25 October 1958) was a British racing driver, who competed in Formula One at 14 Grands Prix from 1957 to 1958.

Born in Luton and raised in Kent, Lewis-Evans served in the Royal Corps of Signals before starting his racing career in 1951, driving a Cooper 500. After winning the non-championship 1957 Glover Trophy, he debuted in Formula One at the Monaco Grand Prix with Connaught. Lewis-Evans contested five further Grands Prix in 1957 with Vanwall, taking his maiden pole position at the Italian Grand Prix before retiring with engine issues.

Retaining his seat for 1958, Lewis-Evans also retired from pole at the Dutch Grand Prix, before taking his maiden podiums in Belgium and Portugal. During the season-ending Moroccan Grand Prix at Ain-Diab, Lewis-Evans collided with a barrier after an engine seizure, suffering fatal burns. He ended his career with two pole position, two podiums, and 16 championship points, finishing the season ninth in the World Drivers' Championship.

== Early life ==
Lewis-Evans was born in Luton, Bedfordshire, but largely grew up in Kent, where his father, Lewis "Pop" Lewis-Evans, owned and ran a garage business. Pop Lewis-Evans had previously been a mechanic for the well-known racing driver Earl Howe, but had not previously raced himself. On leaving school, Lewis-Evans was apprenticed for three years to Vauxhall Motors, back in Bedfordshire, before he was called up for National Service. During this time, he served as a motorcycle despatch rider for the Royal Corps of Signals.

== Career ==
Lewis-Evans began racing in 1951 with a Cooper 500 Formula 3 car, encouraged by and sometimes racing against his father. He achieved many wins and podia and continued to race in 500s until 1956, with the engines prepared by Francis Beart during the later years, including a 1–2 victory at Nurburgring in May 1954 with Stirling Moss in Coopers, with Moss, first, in a Beart Cooper and Lewis-Evans, second, in a Cooper with a Beart-prepared engine.

In 1957, he won the 1957 Glover Trophy, run to Formula One rules at Goodwood. In his first championship Formula One race, the 1957 Monaco Grand Prix, Lewis-Evans finished fourth in an inferior Connaught Type B, beaten only by multiple winners Fangio and Brooks, and Masten Gregory in one of the dominant Maserati 250F cars. This performance brought him to the attention of Tony Vandervell, owner of the rising Vanwall team, and by the next Grand Prix Lewis-Evans was driving the third Vanwall. The 1957 Vanwall was fast when its engine held together, but not always reliable. Lewis-Evans achieved his best finish for Vanwall when he was 2nd at the year's non-championship Moroccan Grand Prix. He took pole position at the final World Championship event, the Italian Grand Prix, but had to retire with engine problems.

The 1958 Formula One season would prove to be a much better year, at least initially, for the entire Vanwall team. Principal drivers Stirling Moss and Tony Brooks took three victories each for Vanwall, with Moss also having won the season opener in the Rob Walker Cooper. Lewis-Evans' podium finishes in the Belgian and Portuguese events added nothing to the team's points haul as these races were won by Vanwall, but it reduced the points won by other makes. He also took pole position at the Dutch Grand Prix, but failed to finish in the race. This was not his only retirement of the year – indeed his only other finish, although points-scoring, was a fourth place at the British Grand Prix.

Lewis-Evans crashed heavily at the dusty Ain-Diab Circuit during the season-ending Moroccan Grand Prix. His car's engine seized and sent him lurching into barriers at high speed, where it burst into flames. He was airlifted back to the UK, but died of his burns in hospital six days after the accident. His death cast a pall over Vanwall's victory in the 1958 International Cup for F1 Manufacturers, an achievement to which Lewis-Evans had contributed significantly. Vandervell never fully recovered from Lewis-Evans's death and withdrew from motorsport at the end of 1958.

== Racing record ==
=== Complete Formula One World Championship results ===
(key; Grands Prix in bold indicate pole position)

Year	Entrant	Chassis	Engine	1	2	3	4	5	6	7	8	9	10	11	WDC	Points
1957	Connaught Engineering	Connaught Type B	Alta Straight-4	ARG	MON; 4	500									12th	5
1957	Vandervell Products Ltd.	Vanwall	Vanwall Straight-4				FRA; Ret	GBR; 7	GER; Ret	PES; 5	**ITA**; Ret				12th	5
1958	Vandervell Products Ltd.	Vanwall	Vanwall Straight-4	ARG	MON; Ret	**NED**; Ret	500	BEL; 3	FRA; Ret	GBR; 4	GER; DNA	POR; 3	ITA; Ret	MOR; Ret	9th	11

=== Non-Championship Formula One results ===
(key)

Year	Entrant	Chassis	Engine	1	2	3	4	5	6	7	8	9	10	11	12	13
1956	Connaught Engineering	Connaught Type B	Alta Straight-4	NZL	BUE	GLO	SYR	BAR	INT	NAP	AIN	VAN	CAE	SUS	**BRS**; 2	AUS
1957	Connaught Engineering	Connaught Type B	Alta Straight-4	BUE	SYR	PAU	GLV; 1	NAP; Ret								
1957	Vandervell Products Ltd.	Vanwall	Vanwall Straight-4						RMS; 3	CAE	INT	MOD	MOR; 2			
1958	Connaught Engineering	Connaught Type B	Alta Straight-4	BUE	GLV; 5	SYR										
1958	British Racing Partnership	Cooper T45	Climax Straight-4				AIN; 5	INT; 7	CAE; 5							

== See also ==
- Bernie Ecclestone

Preceded by Peter Collins	Formula One fatal accidents 19 October 1958 (Date of accident); 25 October 1958 (Date of death)	Succeeded by Jerry Unser Jr.
