= Luigi Musso =

Italian racing driver (1924–1958)

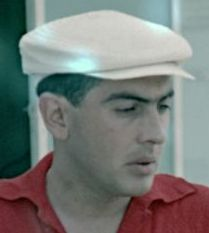
- Musso at the 1957 Argentine Grand Prix
- Born: 28 July 1924; Rome, Kingdom of Italy
- Died: 6 July 1958 (aged 33); Reims, France
- Cause of death: Injuries sustained at the 1958 French Grand Prix

Formula One World Championship career
- Nationality: (Italy) Italian
- Active years: 1953–1958
- Team(s): Maserati, Ferrari
- Entries: 25 (24 starts)
- Championships: 0
- Wins: 1
- Podiums: 7
- Career points: 44
- Pole positions: 0
- Fastest laps: 1
- First entry: 1953 Italian Grand Prix
- First win: 1956 Argentine Grand Prix
- Last entry: 1958 French Grand Prix

Luigi Musso (28 July 1924 – 6 July 1958) was an Italian racing driver, who competed in Formula One from 1953 to 1958. Musso won the 1956 Argentine Grand Prix with Ferrari. Born in Rome, Musso started his career in sportscar racing before progressing to Formula One in 1953 with Maserati at the Italian Grand Prix. He returned in 1954, finishing second at the Spanish Grand Prix to score his maiden podium finish. Musso raced full-time for Maserati in 1955, repeating his podium feat at the Dutch Grand Prix.

After three seasons at Maserati, he joined rivals Ferrari in 1956. In his debut for Ferrari, Musso won the Argentine Grand Prix alongside Juan Manuel Fangio, (Note: From 1950 to 1961, multiple drivers could compete under the same entry in Formula One, sharing the race classification and points with their teammates.) completing 30 of the 98 laps, but his season was curtailed after a sportscar crash at the Nürburgring. During his time at Ferrari, Musso entered into a fierce rivalry with British drivers Mike Hawthorn and Peter Collins. Multiple podiums followed in 1957, as Musso beat both Hawthorn and Collins to third in the World Drivers' Championship, amongst winning the 1000km Buenos Aires in the World Sportscar Championship as well as the 1958 Targa Florio, plus several podiums with Ferrari sportscars.

During the 1958 French Grand Prix at the fast Reims circuit, Musso was chasing Hawthorn when his Ferrari 246 left the road. He was critically injured and died later. He achieved one win, one fastest lap, and seven podiums in Formula One, as well as three non-championship race victories.

== Racing career ==
Musso was born in Rome and began his racing career driving sports cars before making his début on the Formula One circuit on 17 January 1954, driving a Maserati. In 1954 he won the Coppa Acerbo, a non-championship Formula One race. At Zandvoort, in the 1955 Dutch Grand Prix, Musso placed third in a Maserati. At the end of the 1955 Formula 1 season, he switched to Ferrari. He shared victory in the 1956 Argentine Grand Prix with Juan Manuel Fangio; however, his season was cut short after a crash in a sports car race at Nürburgring.

Musso triumphed in a Ferrari 290 MM in the City of Buenos Aires sports car race on 20 January 1957. He was the third driver of the car. Stirling Moss finished second in a 'light powered' Maserati 300S. Moss made a last-ditch effort for his team at the end, but came up short. A second Ferrari 290 MM, driven by Eugenio Castellotti, came in third. The Ferrari team gained eight points toward the 1957 World Sports Car Championship in the event.

The same year he won the Grand Prix de la Marne. Although the Marne was not part of the Drivers' Championship, Musso still finished third in the overall standings for the season. With Olivier Gendebien he won the 1958 Targa Florio driving a Ferrari Testa Rossa. Later in the year, he shared a 4-litre modified Formula One Ferrari 412 MI with Phil Hill and Mike Hawthorn in the second Race of Two Worlds on the Monza banked oval. They finished third overall in a car that gave way to the purpose-built American oval-track racing cars.

== Rivalry with Hawthorn and Collins ==
Many years after Musso's death, Fiamma Breschi, Musso's girlfriend at the time of his death, revealed the nature of Musso's rivalry with fellow team Ferrari drivers Mike Hawthorn and Peter Collins in a television documentary, The Secret Life of Enzo Ferrari. Breschi recalled that the antagonism between them encouraged all three to take more risks. She said: "The Englishmen (Hawthorn and Collins) had an agreement. Whichever of them won, they would share the winnings equally. It was the two of them against Luigi, who was not part of the agreement. Strength comes in numbers, and they were united against him. This antagonism was actually favourable rather than damaging to Ferrari. The faster the drivers went, the more likely it was that a Ferrari would win." Breschi related that at the time of his death, Musso was in debt, and thus winning the French Grand Prix (traditionally the largest monetary prize of the season) was all-important to him.

Within a year, Collins and Hawthorn were also dead, and Breschi could not suppress a feeling of release. She said: "I had hated them both, first because I was aware of certain facts that were not right, and also because when I came out of the hospital and went back to the hotel, I found them in the square outside the hotel, laughing and playing a game of football with an empty beer-can. So when they died, too, it was liberating for me. Otherwise I would have had unpleasant feelings towards them for ever. This way I could find a sense of peace."

== Death ==
Musso was fatally injured during the 1958 French Grand Prix at Reims when his Ferrari hurtled off the course on the tenth lap of the 50 lap race. Running wide at the tricky Gueux Curve while chasing the leader, fellow Ferrari driver Mike Hawthorn, Musso's Ferrari struck a ditch and somersaulted. Musso was airlifted to hospital with critical head injuries and died later that day. Hawthorn went on to win the race.

== Racing record ==
=== Complete World Drivers' Championship results ===
(key) (Races in italics indicate fastest lap)

| Yr | Entrant | Chassis | Engine | 1 | 2 | 3 | 4 | 5 | 6 | 7 | 8 | 9 | 10 | 11 | WDC | Points |
|---|---|---|---|---|---|---|---|---|---|---|---|---|---|---|---|---|
| 1953 | Officine Alfieri Maserati | Maserati A6GCM | Maserati Straight-6 | ARG | 500 | NED | BEL | FRA | GBR | GER | SUI | ITA; 7* | | | NC | 0 |
| 1954 | Officine Alfieri Maserati | Maserati A6GCM/250F | Maserati Straight-6 | ARG; DNS | 500 | BEL | FRA | GBR | GER | SUI | | | | | 8th | 6 |
| 1954 | Officine Alfieri Maserati | Maserati 250F | Maserati Straight-6 | | | | | | | | ITA; Ret | ESP; 2 | | | 8th | 6 |
| 1955 | Officine Alfieri Maserati | Maserati 250F | Maserati Straight-6 | ARG; 7† | MON; Ret | 500 | BEL; 7 | NED; 3 | GBR; 5 | ITA; Ret | | | | | 10th | 6 |
| 1956 | Scuderia Ferrari | Lancia D50 | Lancia V8 | ARG; 1‡ | MON; Ret | 500 | BEL | FRA | GBR | GER; Ret | ITA; Ret | | | | 11th | 4 |
| 1957 | Scuderia Ferrari | Lancia D50A | Lancia V8 | ARG; Ret | MON | 500 | | | | | | | | | **3rd** | **16** |
| 1957 | Scuderia Ferrari | Ferrari 801 | Lancia V8 | | | | FRA; 2 | GBR; 2 | GER; 4 | PES; Ret | ITA; 8 | | | | **3rd** | **16** |
| 1958 | Scuderia Ferrari | Ferrari Dino 246 | Ferrari V6 | ARG; 2 | MON; 2 | NED; 7 | 500 | BEL; Ret | FRA; Ret | GBR | GER | POR | ITA | MOR | 8th | 12 |

* Shared drive with Sergio Mantovani.
† Shared drive with Sergio Mantovani and Harry Schell.
‡ Shared drive with Juan Manuel Fangio.

=== Non-Championship results ===
(key) (Races in bold indicate pole position) (Races in italics indicate fastest lap)

| Year | Entrant | Chassis | Engine | 1 | 2 | 3 | 4 | 5 | 6 | 7 | 8 | 9 | 10 | 11 | 12 | 13 | 14 | 15 | 16 | 17 | 18 | 19 | 20 | 21 | 22 | 23 | 24 |
|---|---|---|---|---|---|---|---|---|---|---|---|---|---|---|---|---|---|---|---|---|---|---|---|---|---|---|---|
| 1954 | Officine Alfieri Maserati | Maserati 250F | Maserati Straight-6 | SYR | PAU | LAV | BOR | INT | BAR | CUR | ROM; Ret | FRO | COR | BRC | CRY | ROU | CAE | AUG | COR | OUL | RED | PES; 1 | JOE | CAD | BER | GOO | DAI |
| 1955 | Officine Alfieri Maserati | Maserati 250F | Maserati Straight-6 | NZL | BUE | VAL; Ret | PAU; Ret | GLO | BOR; 2 | INT | NAP; 2 | ALB | CUR | COR | LON | DAR | RED; DNA | DAT; DNS | OUT; 8 | AVO | SYR'; 2 | | | | | | |
| 1956 | Scuderia Ferrari | Lancia D50 | Lancia V8 | BUE; Ret | GLV | SYR; 2 | AIN | INT | NAP; Ret | 100 | VNW | CAE | BRH | | | | | | | | | | | | | | |
| 1957 | Scuderia Ferrari | Lancia D50 | Lancia V8 | BUE; 3 | SYR; 2 | PAU | GLV | | RMS; 1 | CAE | INT | | | | | | | | | | | | | | | | |
| 1957 | Scuderia Ferrari | Dino 156 F2 | Ferrari V6 | | | | | NAP; 3 | | | | MOD; 2 | MOR | | | | | | | | | | | | | | |
| 1958 | Scuderia Ferrari | Ferrari Dino 246 | Ferrari V6 | BUE | GLV | **SYR**; 1 | AIN | INT | CAE | | | | | | | | | | | | | | | | | | |

== See also ==
- Formula One drivers from Italy

| Preceded by Pat O'Connor | Formula One fatal accidents 6 July 1958 | Succeeded by Peter Collins |
