= 1956 Formula One season =

10th season of FIA's Formula One motor racing

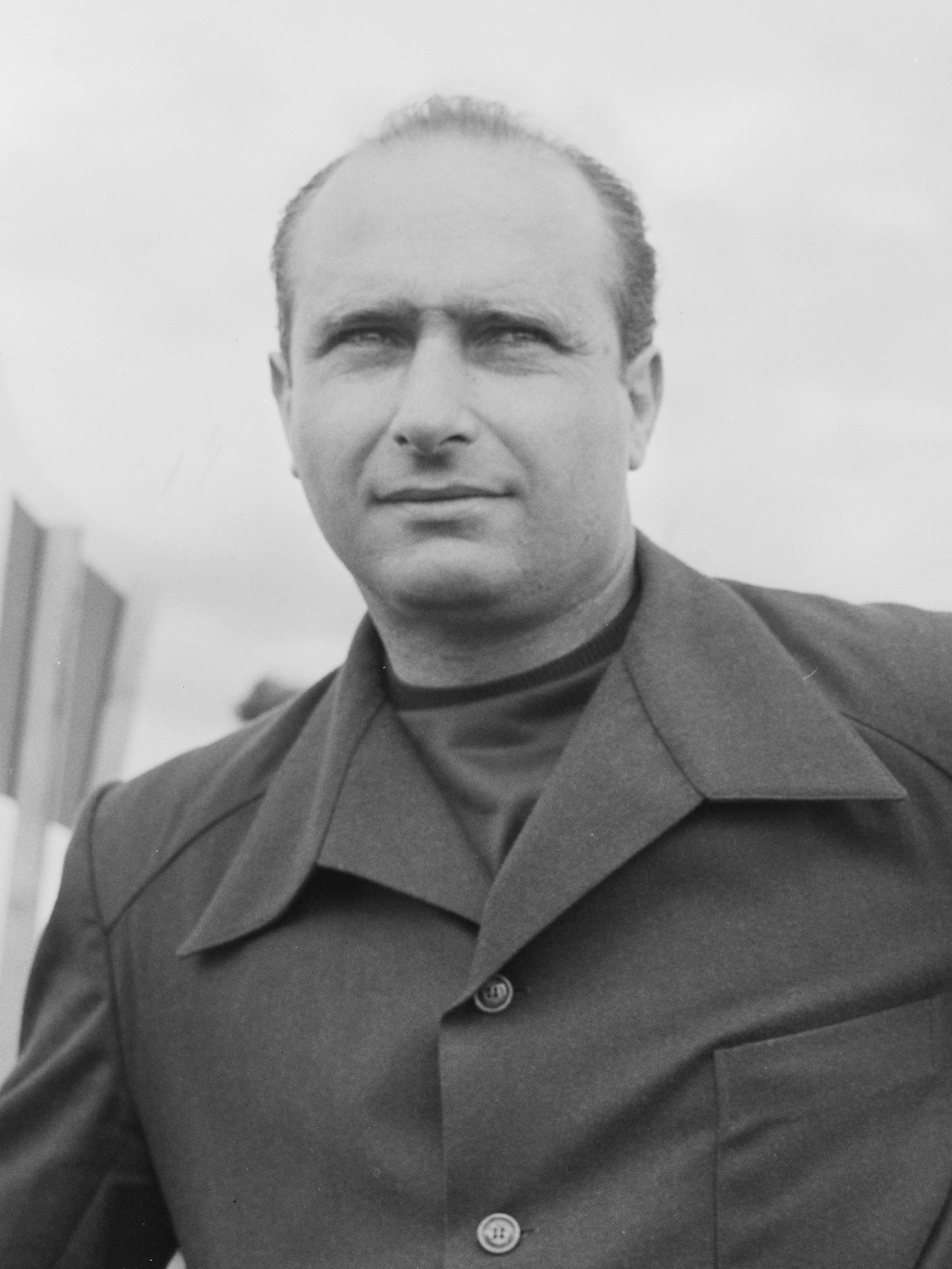
Juan Manuel Fangio (pictured in 1957) driving for Ferrari won his record-extending fourth Drivers' Championship.

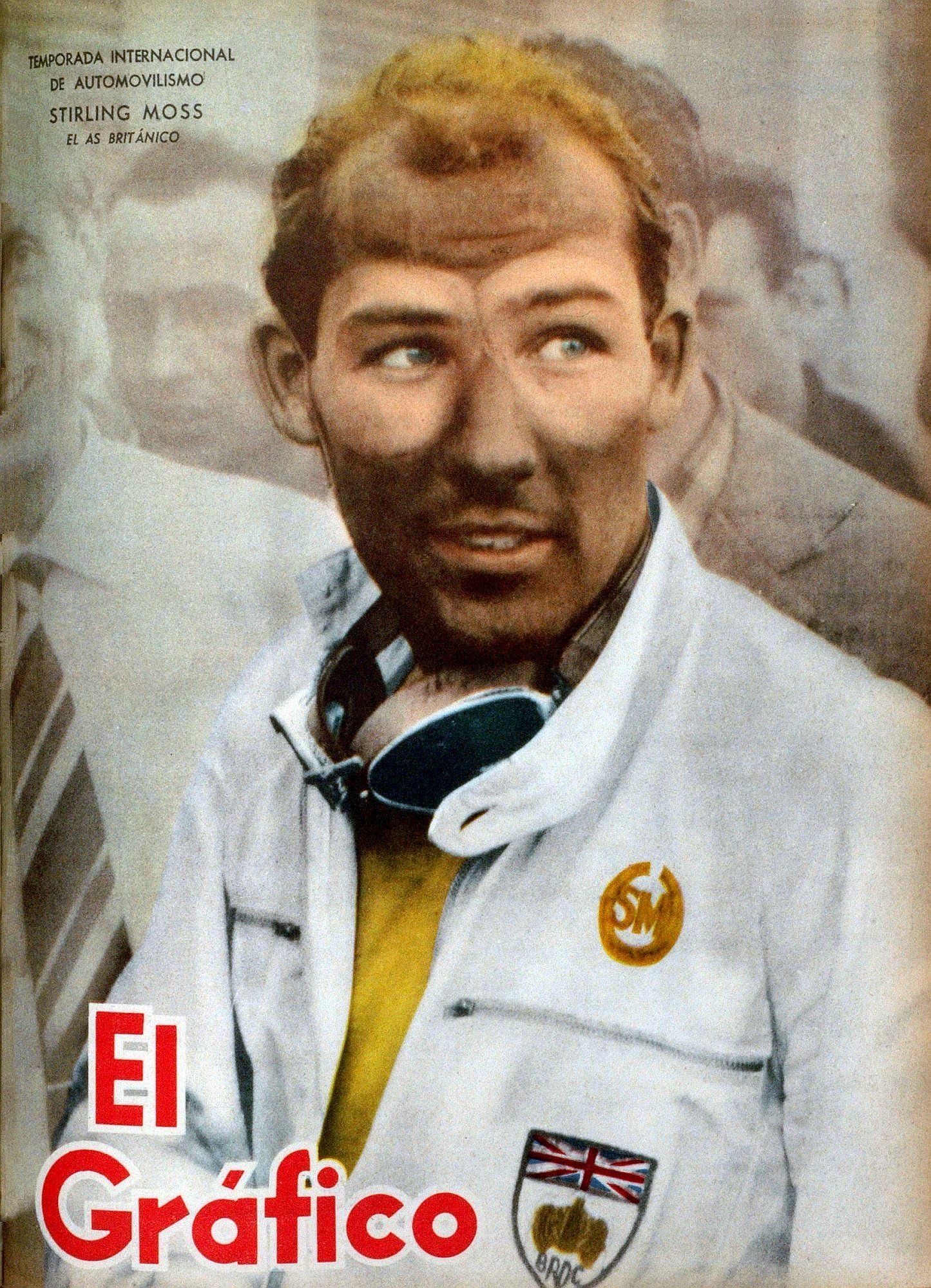
Stirling Moss finished runner-up in the World Championship of Drivers.

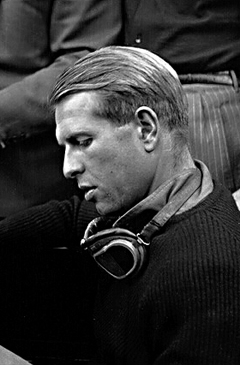
Peter Collins finished third in the World Championship of Drivers.

The 1956 Formula One season was the tenth season of FIA Formula One motor racing. It featured the seventh World Championship of Drivers, which was contested over eight races between 22 January and 2 September 1956. The season also included nine non-championship races for Formula One cars.

Juan Manuel Fangio driving for Ferrari won his third consecutive championship. It was his fourth in total, a record that would not be beaten until Michael Schumacher in 2002. Fangio's main rivals were his teammate Peter Collins and Maserati driver Stirling Moss.

None of the championship races were won by a British constructor. This would not happen again until 2006.

At 29 October, veteran racer Louis Rosier crashed in a sports car race at Montlhéry. He sustained head injuries and succumbed to them three weeks later.

== Teams and drivers ==
The following teams and drivers competed in the 1956 FIA World Championship. The list does not include those who only contested the Indianapolis 500.

Entrant	Constructor	Chassis	Engine	Tyre	Driver	Rounds
(Italy) Officine Alfieri Maserati	Maserati	250F	Maserati 250F1 2.5 L6	P	(United Kingdom) Stirling Moss	1–2, 4–8
(Italy) Officine Alfieri Maserati	Maserati	250F	Maserati 250F1 2.5 L6	P	(France) Jean Behra	1–2, 4–8
(Italy) Officine Alfieri Maserati	Maserati	250F	Maserati 250F1 2.5 L6	P	(Argentina) Carlos Menditeguy	1
(Italy) Officine Alfieri Maserati	Maserati	250F	Maserati 250F1 2.5 L6	P	(Italy) Luigi Piotti	1
(Italy) Officine Alfieri Maserati	Maserati	250F	Maserati 250F1 2.5 L6	P	(Brazil) Chico Landi	1
(Italy) Officine Alfieri Maserati	Maserati	250F	Maserati 250F1 2.5 L6	P	(Italy) Gerino Gerini	1
(Italy) Officine Alfieri Maserati	Maserati	250F	Maserati 250F1 2.5 L6	P	(Argentina) José Froilán González	1
(Italy) Officine Alfieri Maserati	Maserati	250F	Maserati 250F1 2.5 L6	P	(Italy) Cesare Perdisa	2, 4–7
(Italy) Officine Alfieri Maserati	Maserati	250F	Maserati 250F1 2.5 L6	P	(Spain) Paco Godia	4–8
(Italy) Officine Alfieri Maserati	Maserati	250F	Maserati 250F1 2.5 L6	P	(United Kingdom) Mike Hawthorn	4
(Italy) Officine Alfieri Maserati	Maserati	250F	Maserati 250F1 2.5 L6	P	(Italy) Piero Taruffi	5
(Italy) Officine Alfieri Maserati	Maserati	250F	Maserati 250F1 2.5 L6	P	(Italy) Umberto Maglioli	7–8
(Italy) Officine Alfieri Maserati	Maserati	250F	Maserati 250F1 2.5 L6	P	(Italy) Luigi Villoresi	8
(Italy) Officine Alfieri Maserati	Maserati	250F	Maserati 250F1 2.5 L6	P	(Sweden) Jo Bonnier	8
(United Kingdom) Owen Racing Organisation	Maserati	250F	Maserati 250F1 2.5 L6	P D	(United Kingdom) Mike Hawthorn	1
(United Kingdom) Owen Racing Organisation	BRM	P25	BRM P25 2.5 L4	P D	(United Kingdom) Mike Hawthorn	2, 6
(United Kingdom) Owen Racing Organisation	BRM	P25	BRM P25 2.5 L4	P D	(United Kingdom) Tony Brooks	2, 6
(United Kingdom) Owen Racing Organisation	BRM	P25	BRM P25 2.5 L4	P D	(United Kingdom) Ron Flockhart	6
(Uruguay) Alberto Uría	Maserati	A6GCM	Maserati 250F1 2.5 L6	P	(Uruguay) Alberto Uría	1
(Uruguay) Alberto Uría	Maserati	A6GCM	Maserati 250F1 2.5 L6	P	(Uruguay) Óscar González	1
(Italy) Scuderia Ferrari	Ferrari	D50; 555	Ferrari DS50 2.5 V8; Ferrari 555 2.5 L4	E P	(Argentina) Juan Manuel Fangio	1–2, 4–8
(Italy) Scuderia Ferrari	Ferrari	D50; 555	Ferrari DS50 2.5 V8; Ferrari 555 2.5 L4	E P	(Italy) Eugenio Castellotti	1–2, 4–8
(Italy) Scuderia Ferrari	Ferrari	D50; 555	Ferrari DS50 2.5 V8; Ferrari 555 2.5 L4	E P	(Italy) Luigi Musso	1–2, 7–8
(Italy) Scuderia Ferrari	Ferrari	D50; 555	Ferrari DS50 2.5 V8; Ferrari 555 2.5 L4	E P	(United Kingdom) Peter Collins	1–2, 4–8
(Italy) Scuderia Ferrari	Ferrari	D50; 555	Ferrari DS50 2.5 V8; Ferrari 555 2.5 L4	E P	(Belgium) Olivier Gendebien	1, 5
(Italy) Scuderia Ferrari	Ferrari	D50; 555	Ferrari DS50 2.5 V8; Ferrari 555 2.5 L4	E P	(Belgium) Paul Frère	4
(Italy) Scuderia Ferrari	Ferrari	D50; 555	Ferrari DS50 2.5 V8; Ferrari 555 2.5 L4	E P	(Belgium) André Pilette	4
(Italy) Scuderia Ferrari	Ferrari	D50; 555	Ferrari DS50 2.5 V8; Ferrari 555 2.5 L4	E P	(Spain) Alfonso de Portago	5–8
(Italy) Scuderia Ferrari	Ferrari	D50; 555	Ferrari DS50 2.5 V8; Ferrari 555 2.5 L4	E P	(West Germany) Wolfgang von Trips	8
(France) Equipe Gordini	Gordini	T16; T32	Gordini 23 2.5 L6; Gordini 25 2.5 L8	E	(France) Robert Manzon	2, 5–8
(France) Equipe Gordini	Gordini	T16; T32	Gordini 23 2.5 L6; Gordini 25 2.5 L8	E	(France) Élie Bayol	2
(France) Equipe Gordini	Gordini	T16; T32	Gordini 23 2.5 L6; Gordini 25 2.5 L8	E	(Belgium) André Pilette	2, 5, 7
(France) Equipe Gordini	Gordini	T16; T32	Gordini 23 2.5 L6; Gordini 25 2.5 L8	E	(Brazil) Hermano da Silva Ramos	2, 5–6, 8
(France) Equipe Gordini	Gordini	T16; T32	Gordini 23 2.5 L6; Gordini 25 2.5 L8	E	(Belgium) André Milhoux	7
(France) Equipe Gordini	Gordini	T16; T32	Gordini 23 2.5 L6; Gordini 25 2.5 L8	E	(France) André Simon	8
(France) Ecurie Rosier	Maserati	250F	Maserati 250F1 2.5 L6	P	(France) Louis Rosier	2, 4–7
(United Kingdom) Vandervell Products	Vanwall	VW 2	Vanwall 254 2.5 L4	P	(France) Maurice Trintignant	2, 4, 6, 8
(United Kingdom) Vandervell Products	Vanwall	VW 2	Vanwall 254 2.5 L4	P	(United States) Harry Schell	2, 4–6, 8
(United Kingdom) Vandervell Products	Vanwall	VW 2	Vanwall 254 2.5 L4	P	(United Kingdom) Mike Hawthorn	5
(United Kingdom) Vandervell Products	Vanwall	VW 2	Vanwall 254 2.5 L4	P	(United Kingdom) Colin Chapman	5
(United Kingdom) Vandervell Products	Vanwall	VW 2	Vanwall 254 2.5 L4	P	(Argentina) José Froilán González	6
(United Kingdom) Vandervell Products	Vanwall	VW 2	Vanwall 254 2.5 L4	P	(Italy) Piero Taruffi	8
(United Kingdom) Gould's Garage (Bristol) (United Kingdom) H.H. Gould	Maserati	250F	Maserati 250F1 2.5 L6	D	(United Kingdom) Horace Gould	2, 4, 6–7
(Italy) Giorgio Scarlatti	Ferrari	500	Ferrari 500 2.0 L4	P	(Italy) Giorgio Scarlatti	2
(Italy) Scuderia Centro Sud	Maserati	250F	Maserati 250F1 2.5 L6	P	(Monaco) Louis Chiron	2
(Italy) Scuderia Centro Sud	Maserati	250F	Maserati 250F1 2.5 L6	P	(Italy) Luigi Villoresi	4
(Italy) Scuderia Centro Sud	Maserati	250F	Maserati 250F1 2.5 L6	P	(United States) Harry Schell	7
(Italy) Scuderia Centro Sud	Maserati	250F	Maserati 250F1 2.5 L6	P	(Switzerland) Toulo de Graffenried	8
(Italy) Scuderia Centro Sud	Ferrari	500	Ferrari 500 2.0 L4	P	(Italy) Giorgio Scarlatti	7
(Italy) Piero Scotti	Connaught-Alta	B	Alta GP 2.5 L4	P	(Italy) Piero Scotti	4
(France) Automobiles Bugatti	Bugatti	T251	Bugatti 2.5 L8	E	(France) Maurice Trintignant	5
(Italy) Luigi Piotti	Maserati	250F	Maserati 250F1 2.5 L6	P	(Italy) Luigi Villoresi	5–7
(Italy) Luigi Piotti	Maserati	250F	Maserati 250F1 2.5 L6	P	(Italy) Luigi Piotti	7–8
(France) André Simon	Maserati	250F	Maserati 250F1 2.5 L6	P	(France) André Simon	5
(Italy) Scuderia Guastalla	Maserati	250F	Maserati 250F1 2.5 L6	P	(Italy) Umberto Maglioli	6
(Italy) Scuderia Guastalla	Maserati	250F	Maserati 250F1 2.5 L6	P	(Italy) Gerino Gerini	8
(United Kingdom) Connaught Engineering	Connaught-Alta	B	Alta GP 2.5 L4	P A	(United Kingdom) Archie Scott Brown	6, 8
(United Kingdom) Connaught Engineering	Connaught-Alta	B	Alta GP 2.5 L4	P A	(United Kingdom) Desmond Titterington	6
(United Kingdom) Connaught Engineering	Connaught-Alta	B	Alta GP 2.5 L4	P A	(United Kingdom) Jack Fairman	6, 8
(United Kingdom) Connaught Engineering	Connaught-Alta	B	Alta GP 2.5 L4	P A	(United Kingdom) Les Leston	8
(United Kingdom) Connaught Engineering	Connaught-Alta	B	Alta GP 2.5 L4	P A	(United Kingdom) Ron Flockhart	8
(United Kingdom) Bob Gerard	Cooper-Bristol	T23	Bristol BS1 2.0 L6	D	(United Kingdom) Bob Gerard	6
(United Kingdom) Gilby Engineering	Maserati	250F	Maserati 250F1 2.5 L6	D	(United Kingdom) Roy Salvadori	6–8
(United Kingdom) Bruce Halford	Maserati	250F	Maserati 250F1 2.5 L6	D	(United Kingdom) Bruce Halford	6–8
(Australia) Jack Brabham	Maserati	250F	Maserati 250F1 2.5 L6	D	(Australia) Jack Brabham	6
(United Kingdom) Emeryson Cars	Emeryson-Alta	56	Alta GP 2.5 L4	D	(United Kingdom) Paul Emery	6
(Switzerland) Ottorino Volonterio	Maserati	A6GCM	Maserati 250F1 2.5 L6	P	(Switzerland) Ottorino Volonterio	7

=== Team and driver changes ===
- Mercedes had withdrawn from all motorsport activities after the 1955 Le Mans disaster. Reigning champion Juan Manuel Fangio moved to Scuderia Ferrari, which had taken over the assets from Lancia. Fangio would go on to win the championship in the Lancia D50. Besides remaining driver Eugenio Castellotti, the squad was completed by Luigi Musso and Peter Collins, both coming from Maserati.
- Stirling Moss, 1955 runner-up and Fangio's teammate at Mercedes, had moved to rival team Maserati.
- Maurice Trintignant moved from Ferrari to Vanwall to replace Ken Wharton.

==== Mid-season changes ====
- Paco Godia joined the Maserati team from the Belgian Grand Prix on.
- Alfonso de Portago made his debut when he joined Scuderia Ferrari from the French Grand Prix on.
- Also at the French Grand Prix, Colin Chapman made his F1 racing debut with Vanwall but crashed into his team leader during practice and did not start the race. It would be his only race entry, but he would go on to become a legendary race engineer.
- And finally in France, Bugatti made a one-off appearance with their Type 251 driven by Maurice Trintignant.
- For the first time since 1951, BRM used their own chassis, which made its debut at the British Grand Prix. It was also the championship debut for driver Tony Brooks.

== Calendar ==
Round	Grand Prix	Circuit	Date
1	Argentine Grand Prix	(Argentina) Autódromo Oscar Alfredo Gálvez, Buenos Aires	22 January
2	Monaco Grand Prix	Circuit de Monaco, Monte Carlo	13 May
3	Indianapolis 500	(United States) Indianapolis Motor Speedway, Speedway	30 May (Note: The Indianapolis 500 also counted towards the 1956 USAC Championship Car season, and was run for USAC Championship cars, but was not run to Formula One regulations.)
4	Belgian Grand Prix	(Belgium) Circuit de Spa-Francorchamps, Stavelot	3 June
5	French Grand Prix	(France) Reims-Gueux, Gueux	1 July
6	British Grand Prix	(United Kingdom) Silverstone Circuit, Silverstone	14 July
7	German Grand Prix	(West Germany) Nürburgring, Nürburg	5 August
8	Italian Grand Prix	(Italy) Autodromo Nazionale di Monza, Monza	2 September

=== Calendar changes ===
- The Swiss Grand Prix was removed from the calendar after the Swiss Government banned motor racing as a result of the 1955 Le Mans disaster. The French Grand Prix and the German Grand Prix were already cancelled in 1955, but were back on the calendar for 1956.
- The Dutch Grand Prix was supposed to have been held on 17 June but was cancelled due to the Suez Crisis. The Spanish Grand Prix, like the French and German rounds, was supposed to return to the calendar, to be held on 28 October, but was cancelled due to the Suez Crisis.
- The British Grand Prix was moved from Aintree Motor Racing Circuit to Silverstone Circuit, in keeping with the event-sharing arrangement between the two circuits.

== Championship report ==
=== Rounds 1 to 3 ===
Argentinian racing driver Juan Manuel Fangio had already won three Formula One World Championships, while driving for three different constructors. Now he was aiming to make it four in four: after his previous employer Mercedes had withdrawn, he moved to Scuderia Ferrari for 1956. The first race of the season was his home race, the Argentine Grand Prix, and he managed to take pole position in front of the adoring crowd. Teammates Eugenio Castellotti and Luigi Musso started alongside him on the front row. Behind them came a series of Maserati, with the whole field consisting of just thirteen cars, all of them Italian. At the start, sixth-starting Argentinian Carlos Menditeguy managed to take the lead, ahead of teammate Stirling Moss. Fangio was able to follow until his fuel pump broke on lap 21. Musso was called into the pits to give his car to the team leader, but Fangio spun off and was almost lapped by Menditeguy. The latter, however, spun off in sympathy and retired on the spot. Fangio made an inspiring recovery drive until he was in second place and, on lap 70, took the lead when his 1955 teammate Moss's engine failed. He won the race, but received half the points because of the shared drive, ahead of Frenchman Jean Behra and Brit Mike Hawthorn.

As it had been since the inclusion of the Argentine Grand Prix on the calendar, there was a four-month gap to the second race in the championship, the Monaco Grand Prix. Constructors Vanwall, BRM and Gordini attended, but it was Fangio who once again started on pole, ahead of Moss and Castellotti. It was Moss who reached the hairpin first and quickly extended his lead, with the Ferrari trio of Fangio, Collins and Castellotti in pursuit. Suddenly, Fangio spun and ended up facing the wrong way. Hurrying to turn round, he got in the way of Luigi Musso and Harry Schell, who avoided the Ferrari but in doing so, both crashed out. Like in Argentina, Fangio made an impressive recovery drive up to second place. But through the narrow streets of Monte Carlo, there is little margin for error and the reigning champion tapped a wall, bent his rear wheel and retreated into the pits. But again, like in Argentina, he received the car of a teammate - Collins sacrificed his second place - so he could continue. From almost being lapped by Moss, he pressed on to get within six seconds of the lead, but could not stop the Brit from taking his second career victory. Behra finished third, a lap down.

The Indianapolis 500 was included in the Formula One championship, but no active drivers attended. Former champion Nino Farina did, but he failed to qualify. Pat Flaherty won the race.

In the Drivers' Championship, Jean Behra (Maserati) was leading with 10 points, ahead of Juan Manuel Fangio (Scuderia Ferrari) on 9 and Stirling Moss (Maserati) and Pat Flaherty (winner of the Indianapolis 500) on 8.

=== Rounds 4 to 6 ===
The Belgian Grand Prix began with a tense qualifying battle, in which the Maseratis and Ferraris seemed evenly matched, until Juan Manuel Fangio set a lap that was more than ten seconds under the lap record and almost five seconds faster than his closest competitor. However, as it had happened already two times this year, the reigning champion fell back at the race start. Stirling Moss (Maserati) and Peter Collins (Ferrari) had started next to Fangio on the front row and led away. Moss was leading over six seconds before Fangio recovered to second place, but after nine laps, it was the Argentinian leading the Brit by the same distance. Things took a turn when Moss's left rear wheel came off and Castellotti retired with a broken transmission. Moss took over the car from one of his teammates but was over a lap down, while Fangio was setting multiple lap records. Collins was in second place, until on lap 24, the leader's Ferrari suddenly came to a halt at the far end of the circuit, providing no opportunity for a car swap in the pit. So Collins won the race, ahead of teammate and local hero Paul Frère and Moss.

Fangio scored his fourth pole position in a row during the French Grand Prix, with teammates Castellotti and Collins making it an all-Ferrari front row. Two Vanwalls separated them from their main rivals, Maserati. Fangio again lost the lead at the start, but the trio of red cars did run away from the rest of the field. Moss and Schell retired and the Ferrari team even occupied five positions at the front. Schell, however, took over the car from one of his teammates, set a new lap record and managed to close up to the unsighted leaders. The green car from Britain was faster on the straight, so the Italian squad drove side-by-side to try to block him. But going into one of the hairpins, Schell managed to pass Collins and Castellotti in one move and immediately dove into Fangio's slipstream. The reigning champion held on, however, and Schell's valiant drive came to a halt when technical issues forced a pit stop. On lap 40, Fangio also pitted with a split fuel line. It seemed not one race was going smoothly this year. Collins was carefree as he scored his second win in a row, ahead of teammate Castellotti and Frenchman Jean Behra.

The British Grand Prix saw three local drivers qualify on the front row, which the wide Silverstone circuit allowed to consist of four cars: Moss, Fangio, Hawthorn (BRM) and Collins. The BRM seemed the odd one out, even more so when he took the lead at the start and was closely followed by his teammate Brooks. Fangio got past into second place on lap six, but in an attempt to catch the leader, he spun off and fell back to fifth. Moss was the next to pass Brooks for second and managed to get Hawthorn on lap 16. Both BRMs then sadly retired, as did fellow Brit Salvadori, who was running second at one stage, and Collins. When Moss pitted for motor oil, Fangio closed right up, and when the Brit pitted again due to his engine losing power, there was nothing left to stop the Argentinian from winning. In second came Collins, who had taken over the car from one of his teammates, and in third came Behra.

In the Drivers' Championship, Peter Collins (Ferrari) was leading with 22 points, ahead of Juan Manuel Fangio (Ferrari) with 21 and Jean Behra (Maserati) with 18.

=== Rounds 7 and 8 ===
After an exhilarating British Grand Prix with lots of local drivers, no British teams entered the German Grand Prix. So the grid consisted of the Italian Ferraris and Maseratis, and a few French Gordinis at the back. Juan Manuel Fangio qualified on pole position, three tenths ahead of rival and teammate Peter Collins. Once again, Fangio lost the lead at the start, but he retook it later in the opening lap. Stirling Moss started fourth in his Maserati but overtook Ferrari's Eugenio Castellotti. The leading trio got into a rhythm in which they focussed on finishing the race instead of fighting. They all broke the lap record that was set in 1939. Collins suddenly pitted, he was barely conscious at the wheel. After examining the car, they figured that a leaking fuel line had sent fumes into the cockpit. Collins recovered quickly and took over the car from one of his teammates. But trying everything to catch the leaders, he spun off the track. Fangio won the race quite comfortably, ahead of Moss and Jean Behra. The Frenchman was not in the spotlights but this fifth podium of the year brought him to a shared second place in the championship.

Collins was trailing Fangio by 8 points and the only way for him to win the championship, was to win the Italian Grand Prix and for Fangio to score three points or less, because then his result would not count towards the championship. This scenario would end in both men equalling on 30 points, but Collins winning on countback. The extra point for a fastest lap could make a big difference as well. Future race winner Wolfgang von Trips made his debut with the Ferrari team, but he crashed in practice while doing around 130 mph (210 km/h). He was thrown out and escaped with scratches and bruises, but the car was a complete wreck. The Ferrari team accepted it as the cost of a young driver in a fast car and were blind to the fact that it was caused by a tyre blowout. Fangio scored his sixth pole of the year, ahead of teammates Castellotti and Musso. It might not have surprised anyone, but Fangio lost the lead at the start, this time to both his teammates, who decided to have a personal battle and completely overlook any team tactics. Harry Schell managed to put his Vanwall ahead of Fangio, putting the championship leader close to Moss and Collins. After just five laps, the fierce fighting led to tyre troubles for the leading pair and they both pitted. Castellotti would have another puncture on lap 10, this time crashing out on the steep Monza banking. Schell, Moss and Fangio were released and for the next six laps, there was nothing between them. Collins pitted for new tyres, but the championship leader retired with a broken right front suspension. Moss managed to overtake Schell and grew a big lead, so when Collins came in for another tyre change, he gave his car to Fangio in a gesture of great sportsmanship. A win at Monza would mean so much to the Ferrari team, so he granted his teamleader the opportunity to try to catch the Maserati. Moss pitted twice, bringing him very close to Fangio, but in similar fashion to Monaco, Moss won with a six seconds lead over Fangio. Ron Flockhart took advantage of all the tyre troubles and finished third in his Connaught.

Juan Manuel Fangio (Ferrari) had gathered 30 points and was awarded the 1956 Drivers' Championship. Stirling Moss (Maserati) finished second on 27 points, Peter Collins (Ferrari) third on 25.

== Results and standings ==
=== Grands Prix ===
Round	Grand Prix	Pole position	Fastest lap	Winning driver	Winning constructor	Tyre	Report
1	(Argentina) Argentine Grand Prix	(Argentina) Juan Manuel Fangio	(Argentina) Juan Manuel Fangio	(Italy) Luigi Musso (Argentina) Juan Manuel Fangio	(Italy) Ferrari	E	Report
2	Monaco Grand Prix	(Argentina) Juan Manuel Fangio	(Argentina) Juan Manuel Fangio	(United Kingdom) Stirling Moss	(Italy) Maserati	P	Report
3	(United States) Indianapolis 500	(United States) Pat Flaherty	(United States) Paul Russo	(United States) Pat Flaherty	(United States) Watson-Offenhauser	F	Report
4	(Belgium) Belgian Grand Prix	(Argentina) Juan Manuel Fangio	(United Kingdom) Stirling Moss	(United Kingdom) Peter Collins	(Italy) Ferrari	E	Report
5	(France) French Grand Prix	(Argentina) Juan Manuel Fangio	(Argentina) Juan Manuel Fangio	(United Kingdom) Peter Collins	(Italy) Ferrari	E	Report
6	(United Kingdom) British Grand Prix	(United Kingdom) Stirling Moss	(United Kingdom) Stirling Moss	(Argentina) Juan Manuel Fangio	(Italy) Ferrari	E	Report
7	(West Germany) German Grand Prix	(Argentina) Juan Manuel Fangio	(Argentina) Juan Manuel Fangio	(Argentina) Juan Manuel Fangio	(Italy) Ferrari	E	Report
8	(Italy) Italian Grand Prix	(Argentina) Juan Manuel Fangio	(United Kingdom) Stirling Moss	(United Kingdom) Stirling Moss	(Italy) Maserati	P	Report

=== Scoring system ===
Points were awarded to the top five classified finishers, with an additional point awarded for setting the fastest lap, regardless of finishing position or even classification. Only the best five results counted towards the championship. Shared drives result in shared points for each driver if they finished in a points-scoring position, however, if both cars driven in a shared drive finished in a points-scoring position, only the highest finishing position would count. If more than one driver set the same fastest lap time, the fastest lap point would be divided equally between the drivers. Numbers without parentheses are championship points; numbers in parentheses are total points scored. Points were awarded in the following system:

Position	1st	2nd	3rd	4th	5th	FL
Race	8	6	4	3	2	1

=== World Championship of Drivers standings ===
Pos.	Driver	ARG (Argentina)	MON (Monaco)	500 (United States)	BEL (Belgium)	FRA (France)	GBR (United Kingdom)	GER (West Germany)	ITA (Italy)	Pts.
1	(Argentina) Juan Manuel Fangio	1† / Ret^{P}^{F}	2† / 4†^{P}^{F}		Ret^{P}	4^{P}^{F}	1	1^{P}^{F}	(2† / 8†^{P})	30 (33)
2	(United Kingdom) Stirling Moss	Ret	1		3† / Ret^{F}	5† / Ret	(Ret^{P}^{F})	2	1^{F}	27 (28)
3	(United Kingdom) Peter Collins	Ret	2†		1	1	2† / Ret	Ret† / Ret	2†	25
4	(France) Jean Behra	2	3		7	3	3	3	Ret† / Ret	22
5	(United States) Pat Flaherty			1^{P}						8
6	(Italy) Eugenio Castellotti	Ret	4† / Ret		Ret	2	10†	Ret† / Ret	8† / Ret	7.5
7	(United States) Sam Hanks			2						6
=	(Belgium) Paul Frère				2					6
9	(Spain) Paco Godia				Ret	7	8	4	4	6
10	(United Kingdom) Jack Fairman						4		5	5
11	(Italy) Luigi Musso	1†	Ret					Ret†	Ret	4
=	(United Kingdom) Mike Hawthorn	3	DNS		DNS	10†	Ret			4
=	(United Kingdom) Ron Flockhart						Ret		3	4
=	(United States) Don Freeland			3						4
15	(Spain) Alfonso de Portago					Ret	2† / 10†	Ret†	Ret	3
=	(Italy) Cesare Perdisa		7		3†	5†	7	DNS		3
=	(United States) Harry Schell		Ret		4	10† / Ret	Ret	Ret	Ret	3
=	(United States) Johnnie Parsons			4						3
19	(France) Louis Rosier		Ret		8	6	Ret	5		2
=	(Italy) Luigi Villoresi				5	Ret	6	Ret	Ret†	2
=	(Brazil) Hermano da Silva Ramos		5			8	Ret		Ret	2
=	(United Kingdom) Horace Gould		8		Ret		5	Ret		2
=	(Belgium) Olivier Gendebien	5				Ret				2
=	(United States) Dick Rathmann			5						2
25	(Italy) Gerino Gerini	4†							10	1.5
=	(Brazil) Chico Landi	4†								1.5
27	(United States) Paul Russo			Ret^{F}						1
—	(Belgium) André Pilette		6†		6	11		DNS		0
—	(Italy) Luigi Piotti	Ret						DNS	6	0
—	(United States) Bob Sweikert			6						0
—	(Uruguay) Óscar González	6†								0
—	(Uruguay) Alberto Uría	6†								0
—	(France) Élie Bayol		6†							0
—	(United States) Bob Veith			7						0
—	(Switzerland) Toulo de Graffenried								7	0
—	(United States) Rodger Ward			8						0
—	(France) Robert Manzon		Ret			9	9	Ret	Ret	0
—	(France) André Simon					Ret			9	0
—	(United States) Jimmy Reece			9						0
—	(United States) Cliff Griffith			10						0
—	(United Kingdom) Roy Salvadori						Ret	Ret	11	0
—	(United States) Gene Hartley			11						0
—	(United Kingdom) Bob Gerard						11			0
—	(United States) Fred Agabashian			12						0
—	(United States) Bob Christie			13						0
—	(United States) Al Keller			14						0
—	(United States) Eddie Johnson			15						0
—	(United States) Billy Garrett			16						0
—	(United States) Duke Dinsmore			17						0
—	(United States) Pat O'Connor			18						0
—	(United States) Jimmy Bryan			19						0
—	(Switzerland) Ottorino Volonterio							NC		0
—	(France) Maurice Trintignant		Ret		Ret	Ret	Ret		Ret	0
—	(Italy) Umberto Maglioli						Ret	Ret	Ret†	0
—	(United Kingdom) Bruce Halford						Ret	DSQ	Ret	0
—	(Argentina) José Froilán González	Ret					Ret			0
—	(Italy) Piero Taruffi					Ret			Ret	0
—	(United Kingdom) Tony Brooks		DNS				Ret			0
—	(Italy) Giorgio Scarlatti		DNQ					Ret		0
—	(Argentina) Carlos Menditeguy	Ret								0
—	(United States) Jim Rathmann			Ret						0
—	(United States) Johnnie Tolan			Ret						0
—	(United States) Tony Bettenhausen			Ret						0
—	(United States) Jimmy Daywalt			Ret						0
—	(United States) Jack Turner			Ret						0
—	(United States) Keith Andrews			Ret						0
—	(United States) Andy Linden			Ret						0
—	(United States) Al Herman			Ret						0
—	(United States) Ray Crawford			Ret						0
—	(United States) Johnny Boyd			Ret						0
—	(United States) Troy Ruttman			Ret						0
—	(United States) Johnny Thomson			Ret						0
—	(Italy) Piero Scotti				Ret					0
—	(United Kingdom) Desmond Titterington						Ret			0
—	(United Kingdom) Archie Scott Brown						Ret			0
—	(United Kingdom) Paul Emery						Ret			0
—	(Australia) Jack Brabham						Ret			0
—	(Belgium) André Milhoux							Ret		0
—	(United Kingdom) Les Leston								Ret	0
—	(United States) Ed Elisian			Ret†						0
—	(United States) Eddie Russo			Ret†						0
—	(Sweden) Jo Bonnier								Ret†	0
—	(Monaco) Louis Chiron		DNS							0
—	(United Kingdom) Colin Chapman					DNS				0
—	(West Germany) Wolfgang von Trips								DNS	0
Pos.	Driver	ARG (Argentina)	MON (Monaco)	500 (United States)	BEL (Belgium)	FRA (France)	GBR (United Kingdom)	GER (West Germany)	ITA (Italy)	Pts.

Key
Colour	Result
Gold	Winner
Silver	Second place
Bronze	Third place
Green	Other points position
Blue	Other classified position
Blue	Not classified, finished (NC)
Purple	Not classified, retired (Ret)
Red	Did not qualify (DNQ)
Black	Disqualified (DSQ)
White	Did not start (DNS)
White	Race cancelled (C)
Blank	Did not practice (DNP)
Blank	Excluded (EX)
Blank	Did not arrive (DNA)
Blank	Withdrawn (WD)
Blank	Did not enter (empty cell)
Annotation	Meaning
P	Pole position
F	Fastest lap

- † Position shared between multiple drivers of the same car
- Only the best five results counted towards the championship. Numbers without parentheses are championship points; numbers in parentheses are total points scored.

== Non-championship races ==
The following non-championship races for Formula One cars were also held in 1956:

Race name	Circuit	Date	Winning driver	Constructor	Report
(United Kingdom) IV Glover Trophy	Goodwood	2 April	(United Kingdom) Stirling Moss	(Italy) Maserati	Report
(Italy) VI Gran Premio di Siracusa	Syracuse	15 April	(Argentina) Juan Manuel Fangio	(Italy) Lancia-Ferrari	Report
(United Kingdom) XI BARC Aintree 200	Aintree	21 April	(United Kingdom) Stirling Moss	(Italy) Maserati	Report
(United Kingdom) VIII BRDC International Trophy	Silverstone	5 May	(United Kingdom) Stirling Moss	(United Kingdom) Vanwall	Report
(Italy) IX Gran Premio di Napoli	Posillipo	6 May	(France) Robert Manzon	(France) Gordini	Report
(United Kingdom) I Aintree 100	Aintree	24 June	(United Kingdom) Horace Gould	(Italy) Maserati	Report
(United Kingdom) I Vanwall Trophy	Snetterton	22 July	(United Kingdom) Roy Salvadori	(Italy) Maserati	Report
(France) IV Grand Prix de Caen	Caen	26 August	(United States) Harry Schell	(Italy) Maserati	Report
(United Kingdom) I BRSCC Formula 1 Race	Brands Hatch	14 October	(United Kingdom) Archie Scott Brown	(United Kingdom) Connaught-Alta	Report
