= 1957 Naples Grand Prix =

- Non-championship race in the 1957 Formula One season
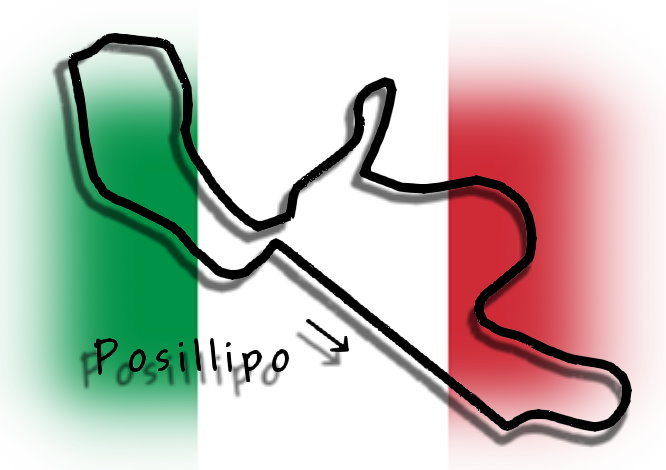

Race details
- Date: 28 April 1957
- Official name: X Gran Premio di Napoli
- Location: Posillipo Circuit, Posillipo, Naples
- Course: Street circuit
- Course length: 4.10 km (2.55 mi)
- Distance: 60 laps, 246.02 km (152.87 mi)

Pole position
Driver	(United Kingdom) Mike Hawthorn	Ferrari
- Time: 2:08.0

Fastest lap
Driver	(United Kingdom) Mike Hawthorn	Ferrari
- Time: 2:05.6

Podium
First	(United Kingdom) Peter Collins	Ferrari
Second	(United Kingdom) Mike Hawthorn	Ferrari
Third	(Italy) Luigi Musso	Maserati

The 10th Naples Grand Prix was a motor race, run to Formula One rules, held on 28 April 1957 at Posillipo Circuit, Naples. The race was run over 60 laps of the circuit, and was won by British driver Peter Collins in a Lancia-Ferrari D50.

== Results ==
Pos	Driver	Entrant	Constructor	Time/Position	Grid
1	(United Kingdom) Peter Collins	Scuderia Ferrari	Lancia-Ferrari D50	2:10:31.2, 113.10 km/h	2
2	(United Kingdom) Mike Hawthorn	Scuderia Ferrari	Lancia-Ferrari D50	2:11:02.1 (+31.9s)	1
3	(Italy) Luigi Musso	Scuderia Ferrari	Ferrari Dino 156	2:11:02.4 (+32.2s)	3
4	(United Kingdom) Horace Gould	Gould's Garage (Bristol)	Maserati 250F	59 laps	4
5	(United States) Masten Gregory	Scuderia Centro Sud	Maserati 250F	58 laps	6
6	(United Kingdom) Bruce Halford	Bruce Halford	Maserati 250F	57 laps	16
7	(Italy) Luigi Bellucci	Luigi Bellucci	Maserati A6GCS	56 laps	14
8	(Italy) Umberto Maglioli	Umberto Maglioli	Porsche RSK	53 laps	8
9	(Italy) Fernando Natella	Fernando Natella	OSCA F2	50 laps	12
Ret.	(Italy) Berardo Taraschi	Berardo Taraschi	Ferrari 166	47 laps - fuel tank	9
Ret.	(Italy) Piero Fiordelesi	Piero Fiordelesi	Fiordelesi-Alfa Romeo	47 laps - engine	10
Ret.	(United Kingdom) Stuart Lewis-Evans	Connaught Engineering	Connaught B Type-Alta	44 laps - front hub	5
Ret.	(Brazil) Hermano da Silva Ramos	Equipe Gordini	Gordini Type 16	14 laps - brakes	7
Ret.	(Italy) Marino Brandoli	Marino Brandoli	Lancia-Marino	9 laps - water pipe	11
Ret.	(Switzerland) Ottorino Volonterio	Ottorino Volonterio	Maserati 250F	4 laps - cylinder block	17
Ret.	(Italy) Alan Mann	Alan Mann	HWM-Alta	3 laps - magneto	13

Previous race: 1957 Glover Trophy	Formula One non-championship races 1957 season	Next race: 1957 Reims Grand Prix
Previous race: 1956 Naples Grand Prix	Naples Grand Prix	Next race: 1961 Naples Grand Prix
