= Grand Prix of Naples =

Non-Championship Motor Race Held In Campania, Italy

- Posillipo Circuit
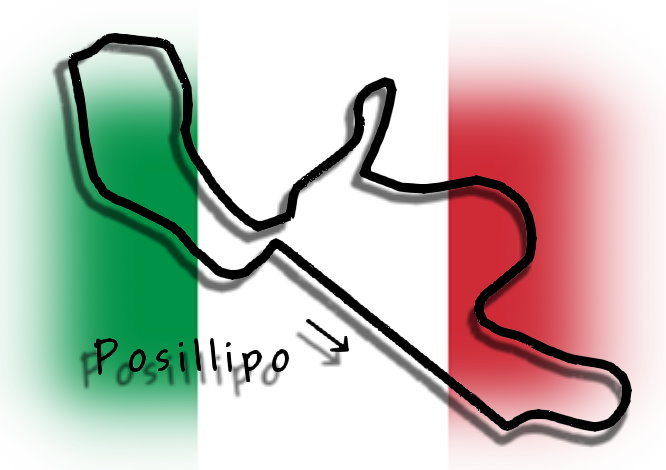

Race information
- Number of times held: 15
- First held: 1948
- Last held: 1962
- Most wins (drivers): (Italy) Giuseppe Farina (2 wins)
- Most wins (constructors): (Italy) Ferrari (8 wins)
- Circuit length: 4.100 km (2.491 miles)

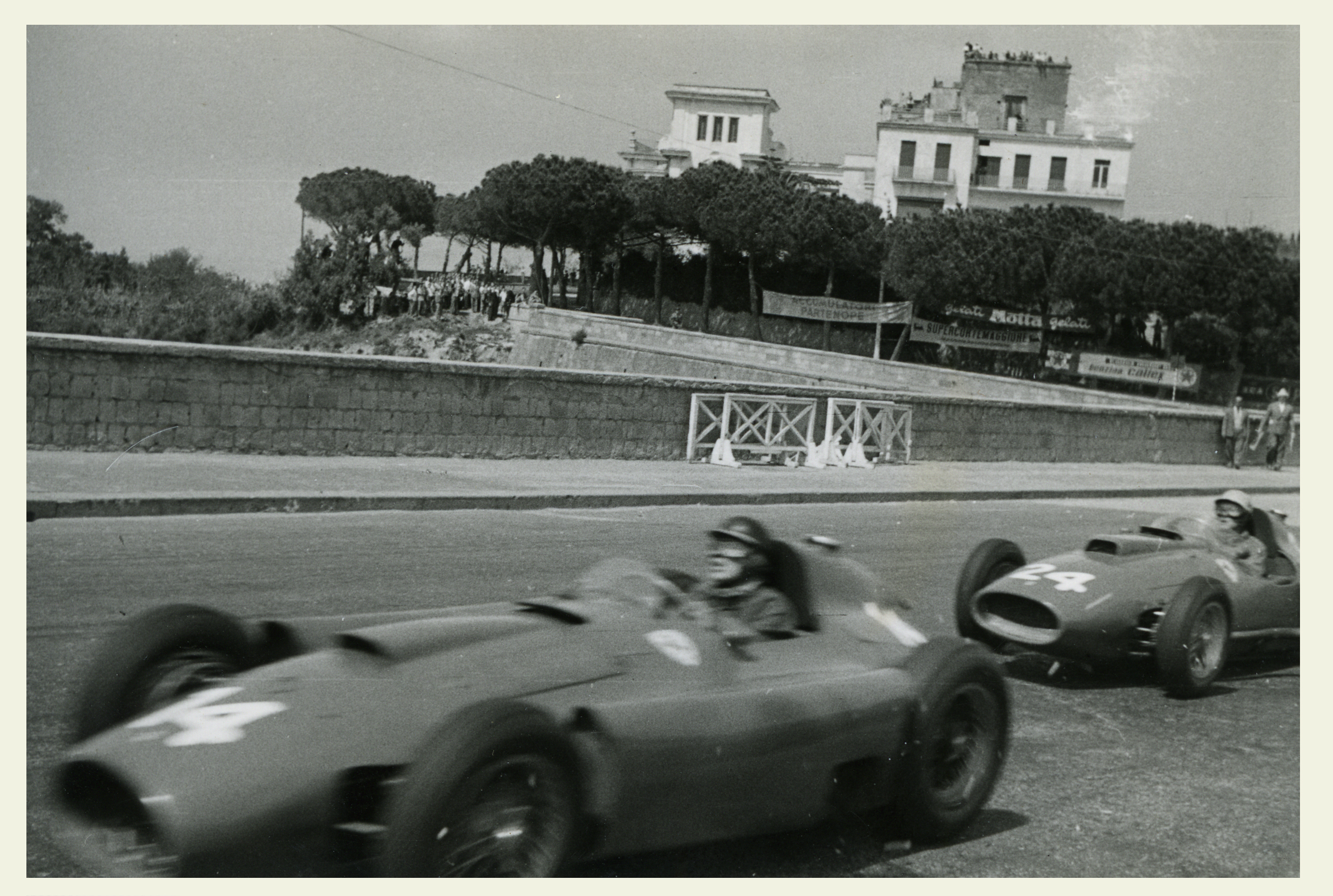
Mike Hawthorn (Ferrari D50) leading Luigi Musso (Dino 156 F2) at the 1957 Grand Prix of Naples

The Grand Prix of Naples was an auto racing event, held in Posillipo, in Naples.

In its original incarnation, it began in 1934. Known as the Coppa Principessa di Piemonte in honor of Marie-José of Belgium, it continued from the same event held in 1933 in the Circuito Province Meridionale. It was held again from 1937 to 1939, although from 1938 it was purely a Voiturette race and attracted all-Maserati entries.

After World War II it was restarted as the Gran Premio di Napoli, starting in 1948. The race took place at the 4,100 metres (2.5 mi) Circuito di Posillipo, going along the Via A. Manzoni and Via Nuova Parco. Starting in Formula Two regulations, but from 1954 it became either a sports car race or a non-Championship Formula One race. It was last held in 1962.

In 1998, the Naples circuit received the Rievocazione Storica Gran Premio di Napoli (Grand Prix of Naples Historic Revival). The name Gran Premio di Napoli now refers to a cycling event.

== Winners ==
Year	Driver/s	Vehicle	Race title
1933	(Italy) Gianfranco Comotti	Alfa Romeo 8C 2600 Monza	I Coppa Principesa di Piemonte‡
1934	(Italy) Tazio Nuvolari	Maserati 6C	II Coppa Principesa di Piemonte
1935 – 1936	Not held		
1937	(Italy) Giuseppe Farina (Italy) Carlo Felice Trossi	Alfa Romeo 12C	III Coppa Principesa di Piemonte
1938	(Italy) Aldo Marazza	Maserati 4CS	IV Coppa Principesa di Piemonte
1939	(United Kingdom) John Peter Wakefield	Maserati 6CL	V Coppa Principesa di Piemonte
1940 – 1947	Not held		
1948	(Italy) Luigi Villoresi	Osca MT4	I Gran Premio di Napoli
1949	(Italy) Roberto Vallone	Ferrari 166C	II Gran Premio di Napoli
1950	(Italy) Franco Cortese	Ferrari 166 F2	III Gran Premio di Napoli
1951	(Italy) Alberto Ascari	Ferrari 166 F2	IV Gran Premio di Napoli
1952	(Italy) Giuseppe Farina	Ferrari 500 F2	V Gran Premio di Napoli
1953	(Italy) Giuseppe Farina	Ferrari 500 F2	VI Gran Premio di Napoli
1954	(Italy) Luigi Musso	Maserati A6 GCS	VII Gran Premio di Napoli
1955	(Italy) Alberto Ascari	Lancia D50	VIII Gran Premio di Napoli
1956	(France) Robert Manzon	Gordini T16	IX Gran Premio di Napoli
1957	(United Kingdom) Peter Collins	Lancia-Ferrari D50	X Gran Premio di Napoli
1958	(Sweden) Joakim Bonnier	Maserati 200S	XI Gran Premio di Napoli
1959	(United States) Tony Settember	WRE Maserati	XII Gran Premio di Napoli
1960	(Italy) Menato Boffa	WRE Maserati	XIII Gran Premio di Napoli
1961	(Italy) Giancarlo Baghetti	Ferrari 156	XIV Gran Premio di Napoli
1962	(Belgium) Willy Mairesse	Ferrari 156	XV Gran Premio di Napoli

  - ‡ - Not held in Naples
