= Giorgio Scarlatti =

Italian racing driver (1921–1990)

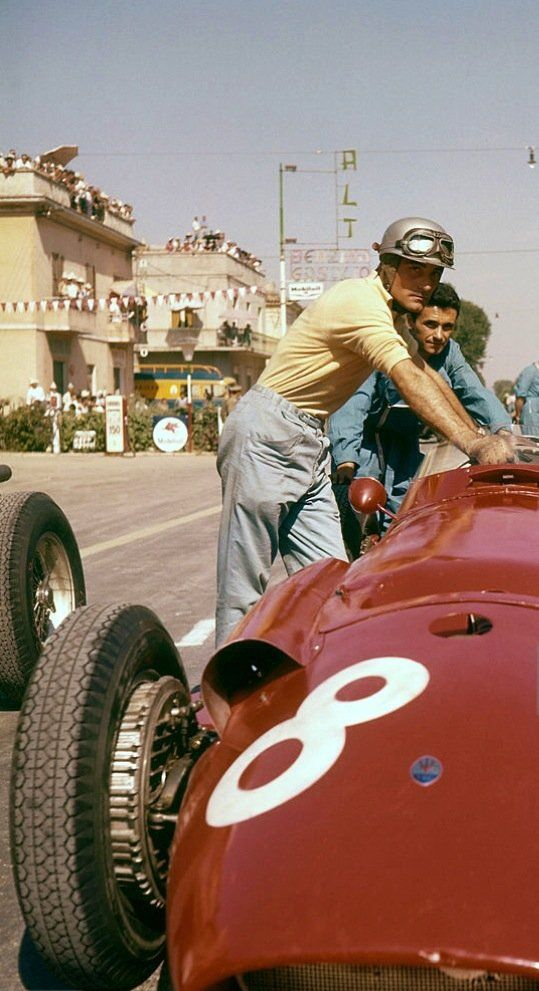
- Scarlatti and his Maserati 250F at the 1957 Pescara Grand Prix
- Born: 2 October 1921; Rome, Italy
- Died: 26 July 1990 (aged 68); Rome, Italy

Formula One World Championship career
- Nationality: (Italy) Italian
- Active years: 1956 – 1961
- Team(s): Maserati and Cooper (Inc. non-works); Non-works Ferrari and De Tomaso
- Entries: 15 (12 starts)
- Championships: 0
- Wins: 0
- Podiums: 0
- Career points: 1
- Pole positions: 0
- Fastest laps: 0
- First entry: 1956 Monaco Grand Prix
- Last entry: 1961 French Grand Prix

Giorgio Scarlatti (2 October 1921 – 26 July 1990) was a racing driver from Italy. He participated in 15 Formula One World Championship Grands Prix, debuting on 13 May 1956.

== Formula One career ==
Scarlatti was born in Rome. He got interested in racing right after the end of World War II. His first outings were with a Maserati A6. In 1955, he entered the Naples Grand Prix at the wheel of a Ferrari 500 F2 and finished fourth.

Scarlatti's performance caught the eye of Maserati, who decided to hire him for the 1957 Formula One season. Scarlatti's best results were at the Pescara Grand Prix, where he narrowly missed out on the points-scoring positions when his Maserati 250F was overtaken in the latter stages by Stuart Lewis-Evans and the Italian Grand Prix, where he finished fifth, sharing the car with Harry Schell.

== Sports car racing ==
In 1957, Scarlatti competed at the 24 Hours of Le Mans, sharing a Maserati with Joakim Bonnier. Bonnier and Scarlatti were forced to retire after seven hours due to a clutch problem.

In 1958, Scarlatti finished second at the Targa Florio together with Jean Behra on a Porsche 718. In 1961, Scarlatti and Lorenzo Bandini won the 4 Hours of Pescara on a Ferrari 250 Testa Rossa.

== Complete Formula One World Championship results ==
(key)

Year	Entrant	Chassis	Engine	1	2	3	4	5	6	7	8	9	10	11	WDC	Points
1956	Giorgio Scarlatti	Ferrari 500	Ferrari Straight-4	ARG	MON; DNQ	500	BEL	FRA	GBR						NC	0
1956	Scuderia Centro Sud	Ferrari 500	Ferrari Straight-4							GER; Ret	ITA				NC	0
1957	Officine Alfieri Maserati	Maserati 250F	Maserati Straight-6	ARG	MON; Ret*	500	FRA	GBR	GER; 10	PES; 6	ITA; 5*				20th	1
1958	Giorgio Scarlatti	Maserati 250F	Maserati Straight-6	ARG	MON; Ret	NED; Ret	500	BEL	FRA	GBR	GER	POR	ITA	MOR	NC	0
1959	Scuderia Ugolini	Maserati 250F	Maserati Straight-6	MON; DNQ	500	NED	FRA; 8	GBR	GER	POR					NC	0
1959	Cooper Car Company	Cooper T51	Climax Straight-4								ITA; 12	USA			NC	0
1960	Giorgio Scarlatti	Maserati 250F	Maserati Straight-6	ARG; Ret											NC	0
1960	Scuderia Castellotti	Cooper T51	Ferrari Straight-4		MON; DNQ	500	NED	BEL	FRA	GBR	POR				NC	0
1960	Scuderia Centro Sud	Cooper T51	Maserati Straight-4									ITA; Ret	USA		NC	0
1961	Scuderia Serenissima	De Tomaso F1	O.S.C.A. Straight-4	MON	NED	BEL	FRA; Ret	GBR							NC	0
1961	Scuderia Serenissima	De Tomaso F1	Alfa Romeo Straight-4						GER; DNA	ITA	USA				NC	0

* Indicates shared drive with Harry Schell
