= Lancia D50 =

Racing automobile

Lancia D50/Ferrari D50
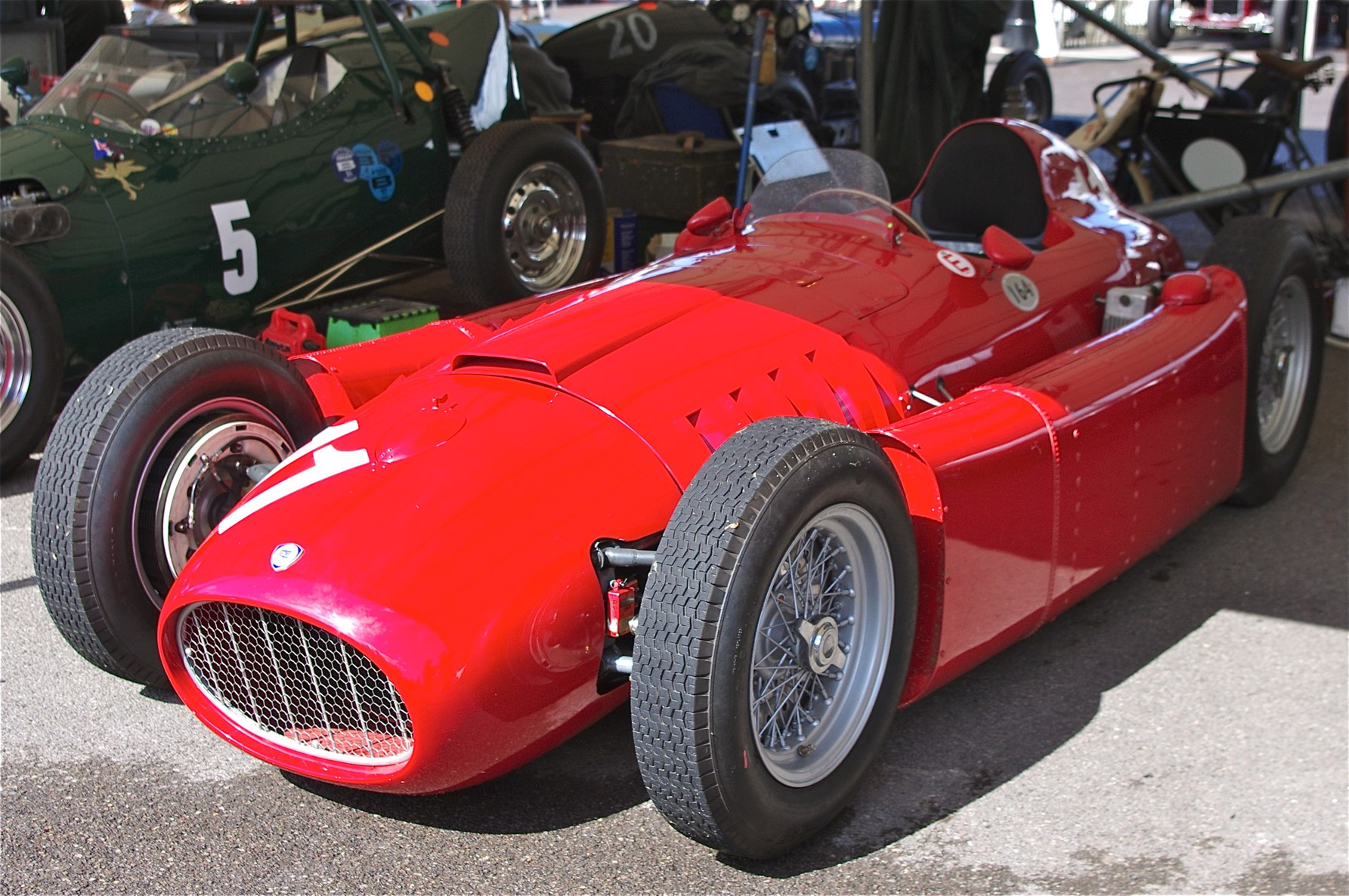
- Category: Formula One
- Constructor: Lancia/Ferrari
- Designer: Vittorio Jano
- Predecessor: Ferrari 553
- Successor: Ferrari 246 F1

Technical specifications
- Chassis: Multi-tubular, with stressed engine
- Suspension (front): Unequal length, tubular double wishbone, with transverse leaf spring and inboard dampers
- Suspension (rear): De Dion tube, with transverse leaf spring and inboard dampers
- Axle track: F: 1,294 mm (50.9 in); R: 1,330 mm (52.4 in)
- Wheelbase: 2,280 mm (89.8 in)
- Engine: Lancia DS50 2,488 cc (152 cu in) 90° V8 Naturally aspirated front-mounted 1954: 260 bhp (194 kW). 1955/6: 285 bhp (213 kW)
- Transmission: Lancia 5-speed manual transaxle
- Weight: 620 kg (1,367 lb)
- Fuel: gasoline
- Tyres: Pirelli/Englebert

Competition history
- Notable entrants: Scuderia Lancia; Scuderia Ferrari
- Notable drivers: (Italy) Alberto Ascari (Italy) Luigi Villoresi (Italy) Eugenio Castellotti (Argentina) Juan Manuel Fangio (Italy) Luigi Musso (United Kingdom) Peter Collins (Spain) Alfonso de Portago
- Debut: 1954 Spanish Grand Prix
Races	Wins	Poles	F/Laps
14; Lancia: 4 Ferrari: 10	5; 0; 5	8; 2; 6	5; 1; 4
- Drivers' Championships: 1 (1956: Fangio)
- Unless otherwise stated, all data refer to Formula One World Championship Grands Prix only.

The Lancia D50 was a Formula One racing car designed by Vittorio Jano for Lancia in 1954. The car's design made use of many innovative features, such as the use of the engine as a stressed chassis member, the off-centre positioning of the engine to allow a lower overall height, and pannier fuel cells for better weight distribution and aerodynamics. Six of the cars were built, and two of them are displayed in Italian museums.

== Description ==
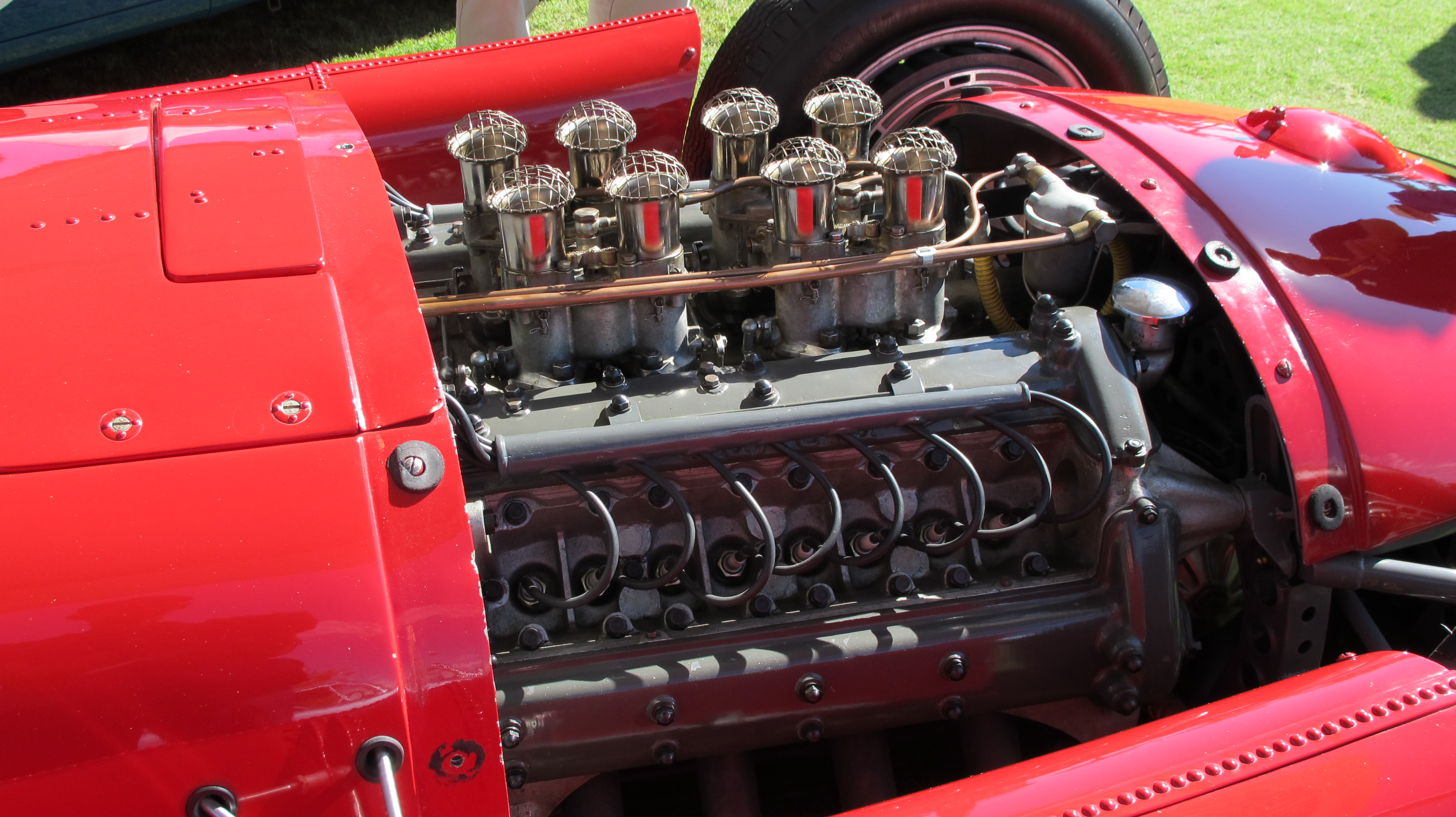
The Jano designed V-8 in the D50

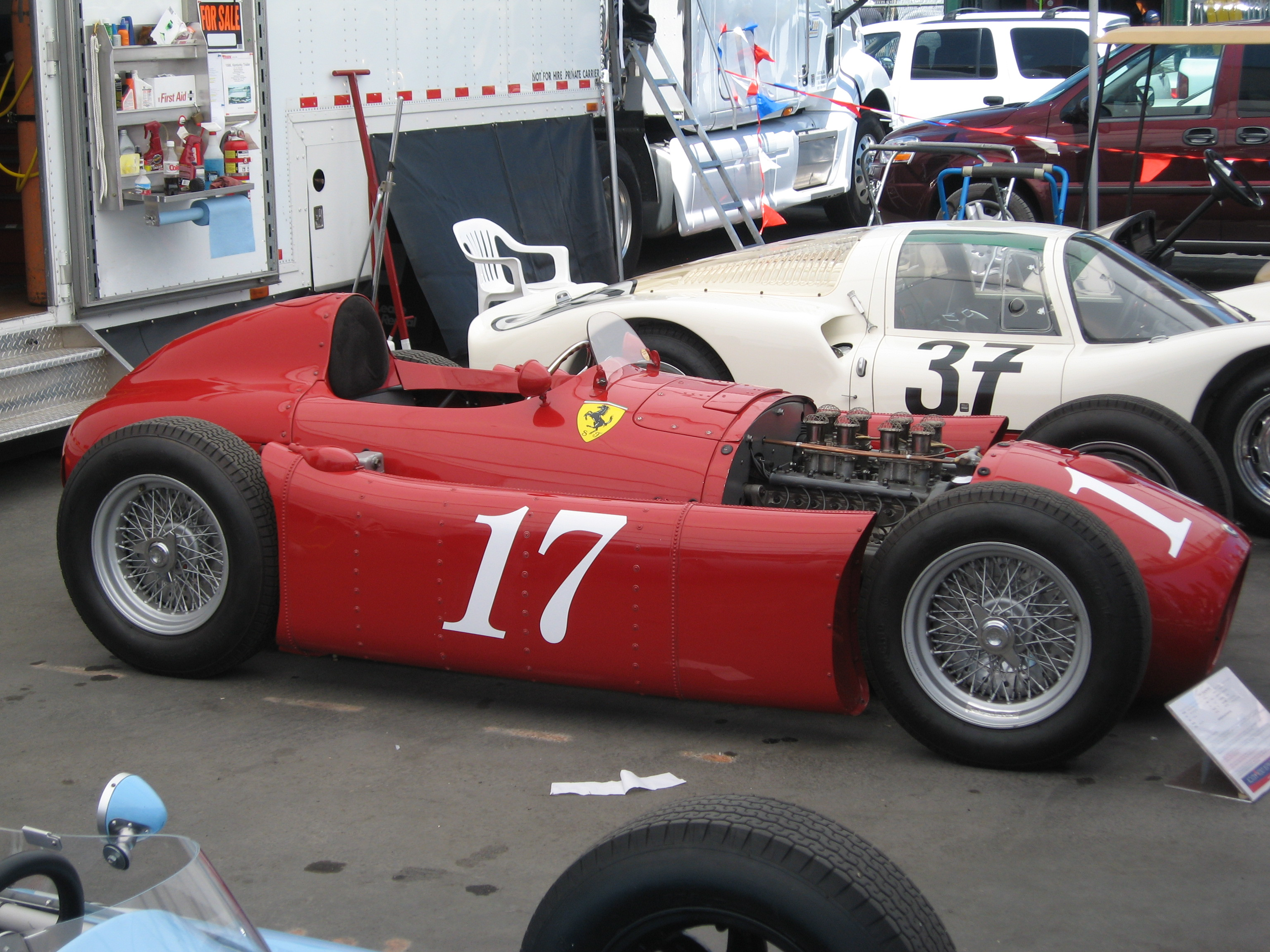
Lancia D50 of Scuderia Ferrari

The D50 made its race debut toward the end of the 1954 Formula One season in the hands of two-time and reigning World Champion, Italian driver Alberto Ascari. In its first event Ascari took both pole position in qualifying and fastest race lap, although his car's clutch failed after only ten laps. Following Ascari's death, and in increasing financial trouble, the Lancia family sold their controlling share in the Lancia company, and the assets of Scuderia Lancia were given to Scuderia Ferrari. Ferrari continued to develop the car, although they removed many of Jano's most innovative designs, and the car was rebadged as the "Lancia-Ferrari D50" and later simply the "Ferrari D50". Juan Manuel Fangio won the 1956 World Championship of Drivers with this car modified by Ferrari. During their competition lifespan D50s were entered into 14 World Championship Formula One Grands Prix, winning five.

== Ferrari 801 ==
The D50s lived on into the 1957 season, much modified as "Ferrari 801s" but were largely uncompetitive against the latest generation of Maserati 250Fs.

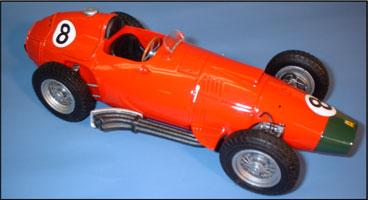
Ferrari 801 scale model

== Technical data ==
Technical data	D50	Ferrari 801
Engine:	Front mounted 8 cylinder V engine
displacement:	2488 cm^{3}	2486 cm^{3}
Bore × stroke:	73.6 × 73.1 mm	76 × 68.5 mm
Max power at rpm:	250 hp at 8 100 rpm	275 hp at 8 400 rpm
Max torque at rpm:	210 Nm at 6 000 rpm	205 Nm at 5 500 rpm
Compression:	11.9:1	11.5:1
Valve control:	2 overhead camshafts per cylinder row, 2 valves per cylinder
Carburetor:	4 Solex ZIL	4 Solex 40 PII
Gearbox:	5-speed manual, transaxle
suspension front:	Double wishbones, transverse leaf springs, hydraulic shock absorbers	Double wishbones, coil springs, anti-roll bars
suspension rear:	De Dion axle, transverse leaf springs, hydraulic shock absorbers	De Dion axle, double longitudinal links, transverse leaf spring
Brakes:	Hydraulic drum brakes
Chassis & body:	Fackverk frame with aluminum body
Wheelbase:	228 cm
Dry weight:	640 kg	654 kg
Top speed:	300 km/h	280 km/h

== Complete Formula One World Championship results ==
(key) (results in bold indicate pole position, results in italics indicate fastest lap)

Year	Designation	Engine	Tyres	Drivers	1	2	3	4	5	6	7	8	9
1954	Lancia D50	Lancia DS50 2.5 V8	**P**		ARG	500	BEL	FRA	GBR	GER	SWI	ITA	ESP
1954	Lancia D50	Lancia DS50 2.5 V8	**P**	Alberto Ascari									**Ret**
1954	Lancia D50	Lancia DS50 2.5 V8	**P**	Luigi Villoresi									Ret
1955	Lancia D50	Lancia DS50 2.5 V8	**P**		ARG	MON	500	BEL	NED	GBR	ITA		
1955	Lancia D50	Lancia DS50 2.5 V8	**P**	Alberto Ascari	Ret	Ret							
1955	Lancia D50	Lancia DS50 2.5 V8	**P**	Luigi Villoresi	Ret^{1}	5							
1955	Lancia D50	Lancia DS50 2.5 V8	**P**	Eugenio Castellotti	Ret^{1}	2		**Ret**					
1955	Lancia D50	Lancia DS50 2.5 V8	**P**	Louis Chiron		6							
1955	Ferrari D50	Lancia DS50 2.5 V8	**E**	Giuseppe Farina							DNS		
1955	Ferrari D50	Lancia DS50 2.5 V8	**E**	Eugenio Castellotti							DNS		
1955	Ferrari D50	Lancia DS50 2.5 V8	**E**	Luigi Villoresi							DNS		
1956	Ferrari D50	Ferrari DS50 2.5 V8	**P** **E**		ARG	MON	500	BEL	FRA	GBR	GER	ITA	
1956	Ferrari D50	Ferrari DS50 2.5 V8	**P** **E**	Juan Manuel Fangio	**1^{1}/** **Ret**	**2^{1}/4^{1}**		**Ret**	**4**	1	**1**	**2^{1}/8^{1}**	
1956	Ferrari D50	Ferrari DS50 2.5 V8	**P** **E**	Eugenio Castellotti	Ret	4^{1}/ Ret		Ret	2	10^{1}	Ret^{1} /Ret	8^{1}/ Ret	
1956	Ferrari D50	Ferrari DS50 2.5 V8	**P** **E**	Luigi Musso	1^{1}	Ret					Ret^{1}	Ret	
1956	Ferrari D50	Ferrari DS50 2.5 V8	**P** **E**	Peter Collins		2^{1}		1	1	2^{1}/ Ret	Ret^{1} /Ret	2^{1}	
1956	Ferrari D50	Ferrari DS50 2.5 V8	**P** **E**	Olivier Gendebien					Ret	DNA			
1956	Ferrari D50	Ferrari DS50 2.5 V8	**P** **E**	Paul Frère				2					
1956	Ferrari D50	Ferrari DS50 2.5 V8	**P** **E**	André Pilette				6					
1956	Ferrari D50	Ferrari DS50 2.5 V8	**P** **E**	Alfonso de Portago					Ret	2^{1}/ 10^{1}	Ret^{1}	Ret	
1956	Ferrari D50	Ferrari DS50 2.5 V8	**P** **E**	Wolfgang von Trips								DNS	
1957	Ferrari D50A; Ferrari 801	DS50 2.5 V8	**E**		ARG	MON	500	FRA	GBR	GER	PES	ITA	
1957	Ferrari D50A; Ferrari 801	DS50 2.5 V8	**E**	Peter Collins	6^{1}/ Ret	Ret		3	Ret	3		Ret	
1957	Ferrari D50A; Ferrari 801	DS50 2.5 V8	**E**	Luigi Musso	Ret			2	2	4	Ret	8	
1957	Ferrari D50A; Ferrari 801	DS50 2.5 V8	**E**	Eugenio Castellotti	Ret								
1957	Ferrari D50A; Ferrari 801	DS50 2.5 V8	**E**	Mike Hawthorn	Ret	Ret^{1}		4	3	2		6	
1957	Ferrari D50A; Ferrari 801	DS50 2.5 V8	**E**	Wolfgang von Trips	6^{1}	7^{1}						3	
1957	Ferrari D50A; Ferrari 801	DS50 2.5 V8	**E**	Cesare Perdisa	6^{1}								
1957	Ferrari D50A; Ferrari 801	DS50 2.5 V8	**E**	Alfonso de Portago	5^{1}								
1957	Ferrari D50A; Ferrari 801	DS50 2.5 V8	**E**	José Froilán González	5^{1}								
1957	Ferrari D50A; Ferrari 801	DS50 2.5 V8	**E**	Maurice Trintignant		5		Ret	4	DNS			

^{1} Shared drive
