= 1957 Italian Grand Prix =

| ← Previous race | Next race → |
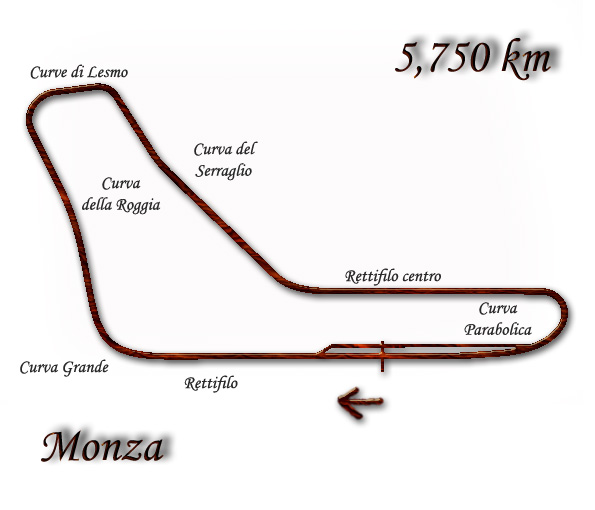
- Autodromo Nazionale di Monza layout

Race details
- Date: 8 September 1957
- Official name: XXVIII Gran Premio d'Italia
- Location: Autodromo Nazionale di Monza, Monza, Italy
- Course: Permanent road course
- Course length: 5.750 km (3.573 miles)
- Distance: 87 laps, 500.25 km (310.84 miles)

Pole position
| Driver | (United Kingdom) Stuart Lewis-Evans | Vanwall |
- Time: 1:42.4

Fastest lap
| Driver | (United Kingdom) Tony Brooks | Vanwall |
- Time: 1:43.7

Podium
| First | (United Kingdom) Stirling Moss | Vanwall |
| Second | (Argentina) Juan Manuel Fangio | Maserati |
| Third | (Germany) Wolfgang von Trips | Ferrari |

The 1957 Italian Grand Prix was a Formula One motor race held on 8 September 1957 at Monza. It was the eighth and final race in the 1957 World Championship of Drivers.

== Classification ==
=== Qualifying ===
| Pos | No | Driver | Constructor | Time | Gap |
|---|---|---|---|---|---|
| 1 | 20 | (United Kingdom) Stuart Lewis-Evans | Vanwall | 1:42.4 | — |
| 2 | 18 | (United Kingdom) Stirling Moss | Vanwall | 1:42.7 | +0.3 |
| 3 | 22 | (United Kingdom) Tony Brooks | Vanwall | 1:42.9 | +0.5 |
| 4 | 2 | (Argentina) Juan Manuel Fangio | Maserati | 1:43.1 | +0.7 |
| 5 | 6 | (France) Jean Behra | Maserati | 1:43.9 | +1.5 |
| 6 | 4 | (United States) Harry Schell | Maserati | 1:45.1 | +2.7 |
| 7 | 30 | (United Kingdom) Peter Collins | Ferrari | 1:45.3 | +2.9 |
| 8 | 36 | (Germany) Wolfgang von Trips | Ferrari | 1:45.5 | +3.1 |
| 9 | 32 | (Italy) Luigi Musso | Ferrari | 1:45.7 | +3.3 |
| 10 | 34 | (United Kingdom) Mike Hawthorn | Ferrari | 1:46.1 | +3.7 |
| 11 | 26 | (United States) Masten Gregory | Maserati | 1:48.9 | +6.5 |
| 12 | 8 | (Italy) Giorgio Scarlatti | Maserati | 1:49.2 | +6.8 |
| 13 | 24 | (Sweden) Jo Bonnier | Maserati | 1:49.7 | +7.3 |
| 14 | 16 | (United Kingdom) Bruce Halford | Maserati | 1:51.6 | +9.2 |
| 15 | 10 | (Spain) Paco Godia | Maserati | 1:52.2 | +9.8 |
| 16 | 28 | (France) André Simon | Maserati | 1:52.8 | +10.4 |
| 17 | 12 | (Italy) Luigi Piotti | Maserati | 1:52.9 | +10.5 |
| 18 | 14 | (United Kingdom) Horace Gould | Maserati | 1:53.7 | +11.3 |

=== Race ===
| Pos | No | Driver | Constructor | Laps | Time/Retired | Grid | Points |
|---|---|---|---|---|---|---|---|
| 1 | 18 | (United Kingdom) Stirling Moss | Vanwall | 87 | 2:35:03.9 | 2 | 8 |
| 2 | 2 | (Argentina) Juan Manuel Fangio | Maserati | 87 | +41.2 secs | 4 | 6 |
| 3 | 36 | (Germany) Wolfgang von Trips | Ferrari | 85 | +2 Laps | 8 | 4 |
| 4 | 26 | (United States) Masten Gregory | Maserati | 84 | +3 Laps | 11 | 3 |
| 5 | 8 | (Italy) Giorgio Scarlatti (United States) Harry Schell | Maserati | 84 | +3 Laps | 12 | 1; 1 |
| 6 | 34 | (United Kingdom) Mike Hawthorn | Ferrari | 83 | +4 Laps | 10 | |
| 7 | 22 | (United Kingdom) Tony Brooks | Vanwall | 82 | +5 Laps | 3 | 1^{1} |
| 8 | 32 | (Italy) Luigi Musso | Ferrari | 82 | +5 Laps | 9 | |
| 9 | 10 | (Spain) Paco Godia | Maserati | 81 | +6 Laps | 15 | |
| 10 | 14 | (United Kingdom) Horace Gould | Maserati | 78 | +9 Laps | 18 | |
| 11 | 28 | (France) André Simon (Switzerland) Ottorino Volonterio | Maserati | 72 | +15 Laps | 16 | |
| Ret | 30 | (United Kingdom) Peter Collins | Ferrari | 62 | Engine | 7 | |
| Ret | 20 | (United Kingdom) Stuart Lewis-Evans | Vanwall | 49 | Engine | 1 | |
| Ret | 6 | (France) Jean Behra | Maserati | 49 | Overheating | 5 | |
| Ret | 16 | (United Kingdom) Bruce Halford | Maserati | 47 | Engine | 14 | |
| Ret | 4 | (United States) Harry Schell | Maserati | 34 | Oil Leak | 6 | |
| Ret | 24 | (Sweden) Jo Bonnier | Maserati | 31 | Overheating | 13 | |
| Ret | 12 | (Italy) Luigi Piotti | Maserati | 3 | Engine | 17 | |

Notes

- ^1 – 1 point for fastest lap

== Shared drives ==
- Car #8: Giorgio Scarlatti (50 laps) and Harry Schell (34 laps). They shared the 2 points for fifth place.
- Car #28: André Simon (40 laps) and Ottorino Volonterio (32 laps).

== Notes ==
- This was the 35th and last podium finish for Juan Manuel Fangio; a record that would be broken by Graham Hill at the 1969 Monaco Grand Prix.

== Final Championship standings ==
- **Bold text** indicates the World Champion.

Drivers' Championship standings

| Pos | Driver | Points |
|---|---|---|
| 1 | (Argentina) **Juan Manuel Fangio** | 40 (46) |
| 2 | (United Kingdom) Stirling Moss | 25 |
| 3 | (Italy) Luigi Musso | 16 |
| 4 | (United Kingdom) Mike Hawthorn | 13 |
| 5 | (United Kingdom) Tony Brooks | 11 |

- Note: Only the top five positions are included. Only the best 5 results counted towards the Championship. Numbers without parentheses are Championship points; numbers in parentheses are total points scored.

| Previous race: 1957 Pescara Grand Prix | FIA Formula One World Championship; 1957 season | Next race: 1958 Argentine Grand Prix |
| Previous race: 1956 Italian Grand Prix | Italian Grand Prix | Next race: 1958 Italian Grand Prix |
