= Ottorino Volonterio =

Swiss racing driver (1917–2003)

- Born: 7 December 1917; Orselina, Switzerland
- Died: 10 March 2003 (aged 85); Lugano, Switzerland

Formula One World Championship career
- Nationality: (Switzerland) Swiss
- Active years: 1954, 1956–1957
- Team: privately entered Maserati
- Entries: 3
- Championships: 0
- Wins: 0
- Podiums: 0
- Career points: 0
- Pole positions: 0
- Fastest laps: 0
- First entry: 1954 Spanish Grand Prix
- Last entry: 1957 Italian Grand Prix

Ottorino Volonterio (7 December 1917 – 10 March 2003) was a racing driver from Switzerland.

== Biography ==
A member of Swiss nobility, Volonterio was born in Orselina and was trained as a lawyer, before he began participating in sports car racing.

Volonterio debuted in Formula One at the 1954 Spanish Grand Prix at Pedralbes in a Maserati 250F which he shared with Emmanuel de Graffenried, but the compatriots retired with engine failure. He contested two other World Championship Grands Prix, the 1956 German Grand Prix on the Nürburgring Nordschleife where he was unclassified having finished 6 laps behind race winner Juan Manuel Fangio, and the 1957 Italian Grand Prix at Monza with André Simon where he finished 11th some 15 laps behind the winner Stirling Moss.

Volonterio continued to compete in non-championship Formula One races and sports cars, with his best result a second place in the Coupe de Paris at Montlhéry in 1955. He also fielded Grand Prix cars for other drivers. He continued racing until 1973, and died in Lugano in 2003.

== Complete Formula One World Championship results ==
(key)

Year	Entrant	Chassis	Engine	1	2	3	4	5	6	7	8	9	WDC	Points
1954	Baron de Graffenried	Maserati 250F	Maserati Straight-6	ARG	500	BEL	FRA	GBR	GER	SUI	ITA	ESP; Ret *	NC	0
1956	Scuderia Centro Sud	Maserati A6GCM/250F	Maserati Straight-6	ARG	MON	500	BEL	FRA	GBR; DNA				NC	0
1956	Ottorino Volonterio	Maserati A6GCM/250F	Maserati Straight-6							GER; NC	ITA		NC	0
1957	Ottorino Volonterio	Maserati 250F	Maserati Straight-6	ARG	MON	500	FRA	GBR	GER	PES	ITA; 11†		NC	0

* Indicates shared drive with Toulo de Graffenried
† Indicates shared drive with André Simon
