= 1957 Monaco Grand Prix =

Coordinates: 43°44′4.74″N 7°25′16.8″E

| ← Previous race | Next race → |

Race details
- Date: 19 May 1957
- Official name: XV Grand Prix Automobile de Monaco
- Location: Circuit de Monaco
- Course: Street Circuit
- Course length: 3.145 km (1.954 miles)
- Distance: 105 laps, 330.225 km (205.17 miles)

Pole position
| Driver | (Argentina) Juan Manuel Fangio | Maserati |
- Time: 1:42.7

Fastest lap
| Driver | (Argentina) Juan Manuel Fangio | Maserati |
- Time: 1:45.6

Podium
| First | (Argentina) Juan Manuel Fangio | Maserati |
| Second | (United Kingdom) Tony Brooks | Vanwall |
| Third | (United States) Masten Gregory | Maserati |

The 1957 Monaco Grand Prix was a Formula One motor race held on 19 May 1957 at Monaco. It was race 2 of 8 in the 1957 World Championship of Drivers.

== Race report ==
Despite a hesitant start, Moss led away on the first lap from Collins, Fangio, and Hawthorn. On lap 4 coming out of the tunnel, there was mayhem. Moss went straight through the chicane, sending debris from the wrecked barrier crashing onto the circuit. Collins crashed through the quayside barriers trying to avoid it. Fangio and Brooks slowed to make their way through the carnage. Brooks' effort was for nought, being hit by Mike Hawthorn's Ferrari, which lost a wheel. Fangio took the lead from Brooks' damaged car and held it to the chequered flag.

On lap 96, with nine laps to go, von Trips lost a certain third place when his engine blew up. Brabham inherited it, but he in turn lost the place when the engine in his Cooper T43-Climax cut out at Casino five laps from the end. He coasted to the harbour and pushed the car home for 6th place.

== Classification ==
=== Qualifying ===
| Pos | No | Driver | Constructor | Time | Gap |
|---|---|---|---|---|---|
| 1 | 32 | (Argentina) Juan Manuel Fangio | Maserati | 1:42.7 | — |
| 2 | 26 | (United Kingdom) Peter Collins | Ferrari | 1:43.3 | +0.6 |
| 3 | 18 | (United Kingdom) Stirling Moss | Vanwall | 1:43.6 | +0.9 |
| 4 | 20 | (United Kingdom) Tony Brooks | Vanwall | 1:44.4 | +1.7 |
| 5 | 28 | (United Kingdom) Mike Hawthorn | Ferrari | 1:44.6 | +1.9 |
| 6 | 30 | (France) Maurice Trintignant | Ferrari | 1:46.7 | +4.0 |
| 7 | 36 | (Argentina) Carlos Menditeguy | Maserati | 1:46.7 | +4.0 |
| 8 | 38 | (United States) Harry Schell | Maserati | 1:47.3 | +4.6 |
| 9 | 24 | (Germany) Wolfgang von Trips | Ferrari | 1:47.9 | +5.2 |
| 10 | 2 | (United States) Masten Gregory | Maserati | 1:48.4 | +5.7 |
| 11 | 6 | (United Kingdom) Ron Flockhart | BRM | 1:48.6 | +5.9 |
| 12 | 22 | (United Kingdom) Horace Gould | Maserati | 1:48.7 | +6.0 |
| 13 | 10 | (United Kingdom) Stuart Lewis-Evans | Connaught-Alta | 1:49.1 | +6.4 |
| 14 | 34 | (Italy) Giorgio Scarlatti | Maserati | 1:49.2 | +6.5 |
| 15 | 14 | (Australia) Jack Brabham | Cooper-Climax | 1:49.3 | +6.6 |
| 16 | 12 | (United Kingdom) Ivor Bueb | Connaught-Alta | 1:49.4 | +6.7 |
| DNQ | 8 | (United Kingdom) Roy Salvadori | BRM | 1:49.6 | +6.9 |
| DNQ | 40 | (Germany) Hans Herrmann | Maserati | 1:49.9 | +7.2 |
| DNQ | 4 | (France) André Simon | Maserati | 1:51.7 | +9.0 |
| DNQ | 42 | (Italy) Luigi Piotti | Maserati | 1:54.3 | +11.6 |
| DNQ | 16 | (United Kingdom) Les Leston | Cooper-Climax | 1:58.9 | +16.2 |

=== Race ===
| Pos | No | Driver | Constructor | Laps | Time/Retired | Grid | Points |
|---|---|---|---|---|---|---|---|
| 1 | 32 | (Argentina) Juan Manuel Fangio | Maserati | 105 | 3:10:12.8 | 1 | 9^{1} |
| 2 | 20 | (United Kingdom) Tony Brooks | Vanwall | 105 | +25.2 secs | 4 | 6 |
| 3 | 2 | (United States) Masten Gregory | Maserati | 103 | +2 Laps | 10 | 4 |
| 4 | 10 | (United Kingdom) Stuart Lewis-Evans | Connaught-Alta | 102 | +3 Laps | 13 | 3 |
| 5 | 30 | (France) Maurice Trintignant | Ferrari | 100 | +5 Laps | 6 | 2 |
| 6 | 14 | (Australia) Jack Brabham | Cooper-Climax | 100 | +5 Laps | 15 | |
| Ret | 24 | (Germany) Wolfgang von Trips (United Kingdom) Mike Hawthorn | Ferrari | 95 | Engine | 9 | |
| Ret | 34 | (Italy) Giorgio Scarlatti (United States) Harry Schell | Maserati | 64 | Oil Leak | 14 | |
| Ret | 6 | (United Kingdom) Ron Flockhart | BRM | 60 | Engine | 11 | |
| Ret | 36 | (Argentina) Carlos Menditeguy | Maserati | 51 | Spun Off | 7 | |
| Ret | 12 | (United Kingdom) Ivor Bueb | Connaught-Alta | 47 | Fuel Leak | 16 | |
| Ret | 38 | (United States) Harry Schell | Maserati | 23 | Suspension | 8 | |
| Ret | 22 | (United Kingdom) Horace Gould | Maserati | 10 | Accident | 12 | |
| Ret | 26 | (United Kingdom) Peter Collins | Ferrari | 4 | Accident | 2 | |
| Ret | 18 | (United Kingdom) Stirling Moss | Vanwall | 4 | Accident | 3 | |
| Ret | 28 | (United Kingdom) Mike Hawthorn | Ferrari | 4 | Accident | 5 | |
| DNQ | 8 | (United Kingdom) Roy Salvadori | BRM | | | | |
| DNQ | 40 | (Germany) Hans Herrmann | Maserati | | | | |
| DNQ | 4 | (France) André Simon | Maserati | | | | |
| DNQ | 42 | (Italy) Luigi Piotti | Maserati | | | | |
| DNQ | 16 | (United Kingdom) Les Leston | Cooper-Climax | | | | |

Notes

- ^1 – Includes 1 point for fastest lap

== Notes ==
This race marked the Formula One World Championship debuts of Masten Gregory, Stuart Lewis-Evans, and Ivor Bueb. Gregory's third place was the first Formula One podium for an American driver (excluding Indianapolis 500 races).

It was also the debut World Championship podium for Vanwall as both a constructor and an engine supplier.

Lastly, it was also the debut race for the Coventry Climax engine, the 4-cylinder FPF, still undersized at 1,964 cc, and mounted in the Cooper T43 in Rear mid-engine, rear-wheel-drive layout similar to the Bugatti Type 251 at the 1956 French Grand Prix. It was also the first F1 finish for both Cooper and Climax even though Brabham pushed the car over the line.

== Shared drives ==
- Car #24: Wolfgang von Trips (92 laps) and Mike Hawthorn (3 laps).
- Car #34: Giorgio Scarlatti (42 laps) and Harry Schell (22 laps).

== Championship standings after the race ==
Drivers' Championship standings

| | Pos | Driver | Points |
|---|---|---|---|
| | 1 | (Argentina) Juan Manuel Fangio | 17 |
| | 2 | (France) Jean Behra | 6 |
| 14 | 3 | (United Kingdom) Tony Brooks | 6 |
| 1 | 4 | (Argentina) Carlos Menditeguy | 4 |
| 12 | 5 | (United States) Masten Gregory | 4 |

- Note: Only the top five positions are included.

| Previous race: 1957 Argentine Grand Prix | FIA Formula One World Championship; 1957 season | Next race: 1957 Indianapolis 500 |
| Previous race: 1956 Monaco Grand Prix | Monaco Grand Prix | Next race: 1958 Monaco Grand Prix |
