= 1956 Aintree 100 =

- Non-championship race in the 1956 Formula One season
- Aintree Circuit

Race details
- Date: 24 June 1956
- Official name: I Aintree 100
- Location: Aintree Circuit, United Kingdom
- Course: Permanent racing facility
- Course length: 4.81 km (3.00 miles)
- Distance: 34 laps, 163.61 km (102.00 miles)

Pole position
Driver	(United Kingdom) Archie Scott-Brown	Connaught
- Time: 2:05.8

Fastest lap
Driver	(United Kingdom) Horace Gould	Maserati
- Time: 2:06.0

Podium
First	(United Kingdom) Horace Gould	Maserati
Second	(United Kingdom) Bob Gerard	Cooper
Third	(United Kingdom) Bruce Halford	Maserati

The 1956 Aintree 100 was a non-championship Formula One race held on 24 June 1956. The race was won by Horace Gould, in a privately entered Maserati 250F.

== Results ==
Pos	No	Driver	Constructor	Car	Time/Retired	Grid
1	7	(United Kingdom) Horace Gould	Gould's Garage (Bristol)	Maserati 250F	1h13m39.8, 83.08mph	3
2	12	(United Kingdom) Bob Gerard	F.R. Gerard	Cooper T23-Bristol	+35.2s	9
3	9	(United Kingdom) Bruce Halford	B. Halford	Maserati 250F	+50.2s	7
4	10	(United Kingdom) Roy Salvadori	Gilby Engineering	Connaught Type A-Lea Francis	+1:43.0	2
5	4	(United Kingdom) Bill Holt	Connaught Engineering	Connaught Type A-Lea Francis	+1 lap	4
6	6	(United Kingdom) Dick Gibson	R. Gibson	Connaught Type A-Lea Francis	+3 laps	6
7	11	(United Kingdom) Paul Emery	Emeryson Cars	Emeryson-Alta	+4 laps	8
Ret	2	(United Kingdom) Archie Scott-Brown	Connaught Engineering	Connaught Type B-Alta	8 laps - oil leak	1
DNS	1	(United Kingdom) Tony Brooks	Owen Racing Organisation	BRM P25	engine	5
DNA	3	(United Kingdom) Tommy Atkins	C.T. Atkins	Connaught Type A-Lea Francis	car driven by Salvadori	-
DNA	5	(United Kingdom) John Young	J.A. Young	Connaught Type A-Lea Francis	-	-
DNA	8	(Australia) Jack Brabham	J.A. Brabham	Maserati 250F	-	

Previous race: 1956 Naples Grand Prix	Formula One non-championship races 1956 season	Next race: 1956 Vanwall Trophy
Previous race: None	Aintree 100	Next race: None
