= Sergio Mantovani =

Italian racing driver (1929–2001)

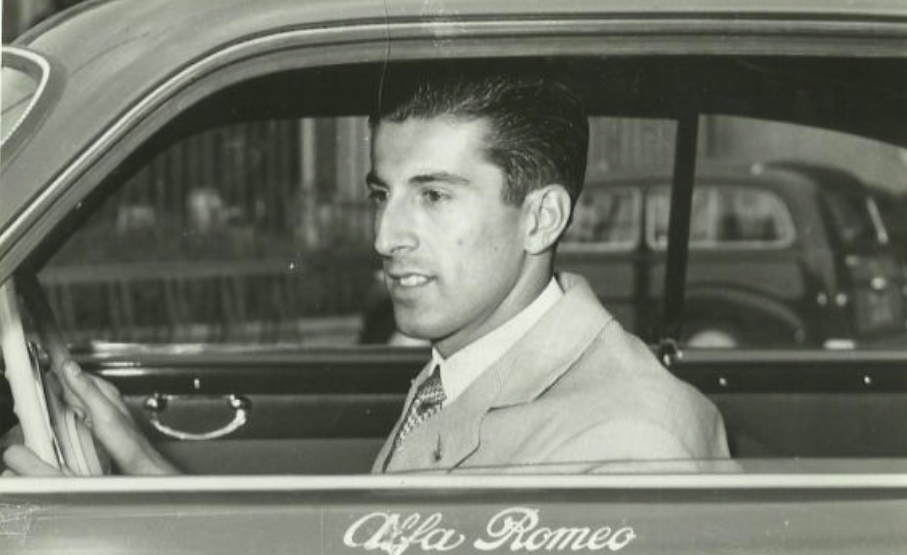
- Born: 22 May 1929; Cusano Milanino, Kingdom of Italy
- Died: 23 February 2001 (aged 71); Milan, Italy

Formula One World Championship career
- Nationality: (Italy) Italian
- Active years: 1953-1955
- Team: Maserati
- Entries: 8 (7 starts)
- Championships: 0
- Wins: 0
- Podiums: 0
- Career points: 4
- Pole positions: 0
- Fastest laps: 0
- First entry: 1953 Italian Grand Prix
- Last entry: 1955 Argentine Grand Prix

Sergio Mantovani (May 22, 1929 - February 23, 2001) was a racing driver from Milan, Italy. He entered 8 Formula One World Championship Grands Prix, debuting on September 13, 1953. He started seven of those races, all for Maserati. His best results were two fifth-place finishes, and he scored a total of four championship points. In non-Championship F1 events, he finished third in the Syracuse and Rome Grands Prix in 1954.

After he lost a leg in a crash during practice for the 1955 Valentino Grand Prix, Mantovani retired and became involved with the Italian Sporting Commission.

== Complete Formula One World Championship results ==
(key)

| Year | Entrant | Chassis | Engine | 1 | 2 | 3 | 4 | 5 | 6 | 7 | 8 | 9 | WDC | Points |
|---|---|---|---|---|---|---|---|---|---|---|---|---|---|---|
| 1953 | Officine Alfieri Maserati | Maserati A6GCM | Maserati Straight-6 | ARG | 500 | NED | BEL | FRA | GBR | GER | SUI | ITA; 7 * | NC | 0 |
| 1954 | Officine Alfieri Maserati | Maserati 250F | Maserati Straight-6 | ARG | 500 | BEL; 7 | FRA; DNS | GBR | GER; 5 | SUI; 5 | ITA; 9 | ESP; Ret | 16th | 4 |
| 1955 | Officine Alfieri Maserati | Maserati 250F | Maserati Straight-6 | ARG; 7 † | MON | 500 | BEL | NED | GBR | ITA | | | NC | 0 |

* Indicates shared drive with Luigi Musso
† Indicates shared drive with Luigi Musso and Harry Schell in Musso's car. Mantovani shared his own car with Musso and Jean Behra before it developed fuel system problems and was retired from the race.
