= Arzani-Volpini =

Italian Formula One constructor

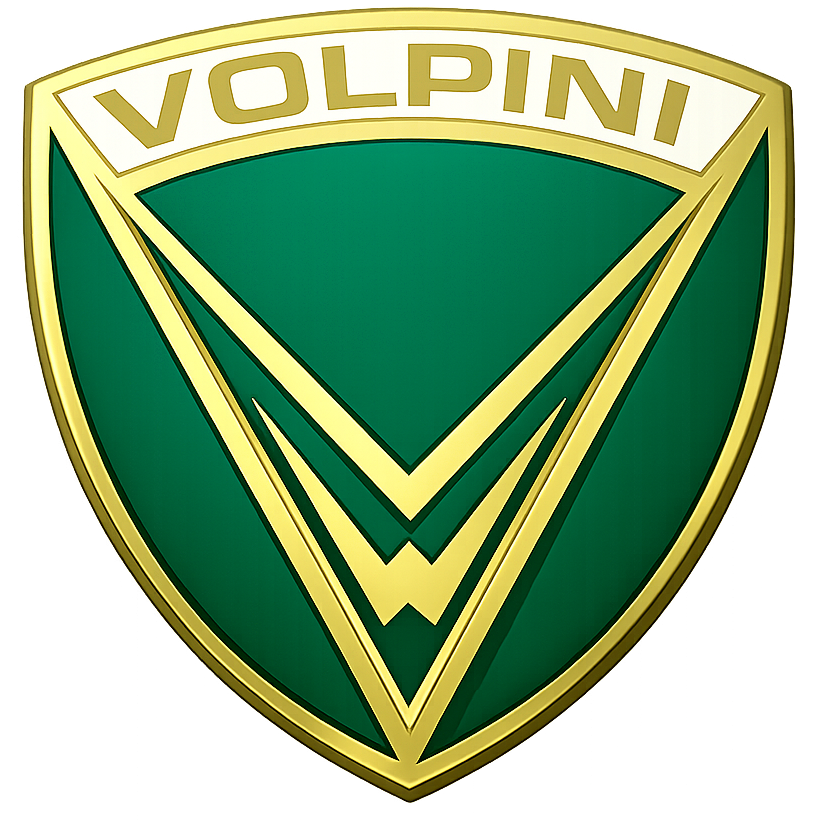
- Full name: (Italy) Scuderia Arzani-Volpini
- Base: Italy
- Founder(s): Gian Paolo Volpini; Egidio Arzani
- Noted drivers: (Italy) Luigi Piotti

Formula One World Championship career
- First entry: 1955 Italian Grand Prix
- Races entered: 1 (0 starts)
- Constructors' Championships: 0
- Drivers' Championships: 0
- Race victories: 0
- Pole positions: 0
- Fastest laps: 0
- Final entry: 1955 Italian Grand Prix

Arzani-Volpini (also known as Scuderia Volpini) was an Italian Formula One constructor, established by Gian Paolo Volpini and engine-builder Egidio Arzani.

Volpini was initially involved in the lower classes of Formula racing, such as Formula Junior and Formula Three. Volpini joined forces with Arzani in 1954, hoping to enter the Formula One World Championship. To this end, the team purchased the chassis of the 1950 Scuderia Milano-Maserati for the 1955 Formula One season. The team subsequently improved the engine and the bodywork of the car. The body was constructed by Carrozzeria Colli. It was entered in the 1955 Valentino Grand Prix for Mario Alborghetti, but it could not be constructed in time. The team made its debut in the 1955 Grand Prix de Pau, where Alborghetti suffered a fatal crash.

The team contested only one Formula One World Championship Grand Prix, the 1955 Italian Grand Prix. Luigi Piotti drove the car, but did not start the race due to a problem with his Maserati-Speluzzi CLT 2.5-litre L4 engine. The team did not return to Formula One afterwards, continuing to construct cars for Formula Junior and Formula Three. One of the customers was Lorenzo Bandini.

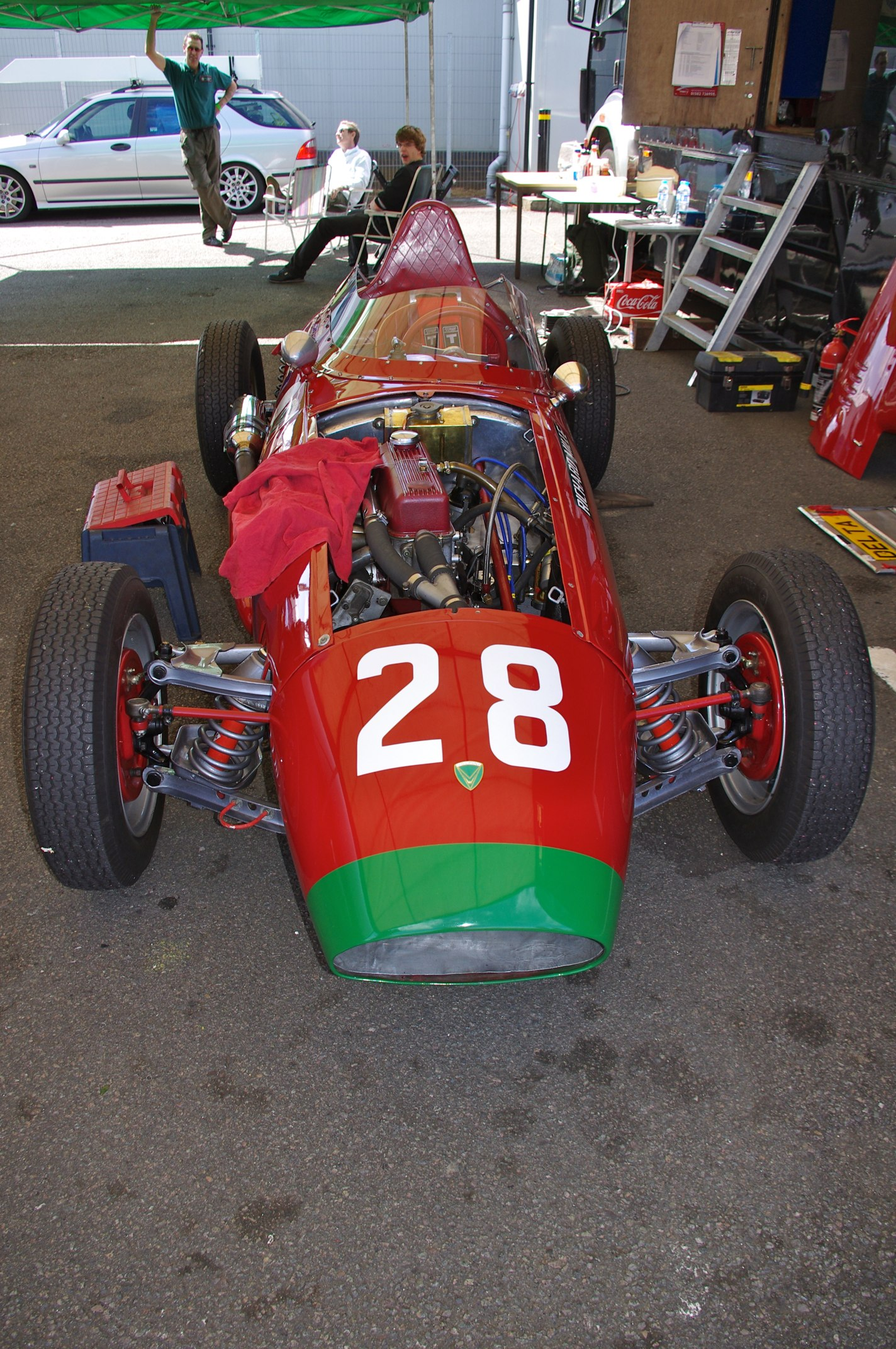
Volpini racecar from 1958

== Complete Formula One World Championship results ==
(key)

Year	Chassis	Engine	Tyres	Driver	1	2	3	4	5	6	7
1955	Arzani-Volpini Special	Maserati L4	P		ARG	MON	500	BEL	NED	GBR	ITA
1955	Arzani-Volpini Special	Maserati L4	P	(Italy) Luigi Piotti							DNS
