= Jerry Hoyt =

American racing driver (1929–2000)

- Born: Gerald Frederick Hoyt; January 29, 1929 Chicago, Illinois, U.S.
- Died: July 10, 1955 (aged 26) Oklahoma City, Oklahoma, U.S.

Champ Car career
- 19 races run over 5 years
- Years active: 1950–1951, 1953–1955
- Best finish: 19th – 1954
- First race: 1950 Indianapolis 500 (Indianapolis)
- Last race: 1955 Langhorne 100 (Langhorne)
| Wins | Podiums | Poles |
|---|---|---|
| 0 | 1 | 1 |

Formula One World Championship career
- Active years: 1950–1951, 1953–1955
- Team(s): Kurtis Kraft, Stevens, Ewing
- Entries: 5 (4 starts)
- Championships: 0
- Wins: 0
- Podiums: 0
- Career points: 0
- Pole positions: 1
- Fastest laps: 0
- First entry: 1950 Indianapolis 500
- Last entry: 1955 Indianapolis 500

Gerald Frederick Hoyt (January 29, 1929 – July 11, 1955) was an American racing driver from Chicago, mainly competing in the National Championship. He died on July 11, 1955, after crashing in a sprint car race at Oklahoma City.

== Indy 500 ==
In the 1955 Indianapolis 500, Hoyt surprised many, including himself, by winning the pole (first starting position) in qualifications. His average speed for the run of 140.045 miles per hour was at the time the second fastest ever at the speedway. However an oil leak would force him to retire from the race after 40 laps. As the 500 was part of the FIA World Championship at the time, Hoyt was credited for being the youngest pole sitter in the history of the series to that point. In his four races at the speedway, he would never complete more than 130 laps in the 200 lap race.

== Death ==
On July 11, 1955, two months after winning the pole at Indianapolis, Hoyt was entered into a sprint car race in Oklahoma City. On the first lap, his car made contact with a fence, causing it to overturn. The cars of the time provided little protection for the driver's head, and Hoyt died the next morning of brain injuries. He had been married just two weeks earlier.

Hoyt is buried at Crown Hill Cemetery in Section 223, Lot 63 at the coordinates 39.8264892°N 86.176888°W in Indianapolis, Indiana.

== Indianapolis 500 results ==
| Year | Car | Start | Qual | Rank | Finish | Laps | Led | Retired |
|---|---|---|---|---|---|---|---|---|
| 1950 | 81 | 15 | 129.520 | 31 | 21 | 125 | 0 | Flagged |
| 1953 | 55 | 7 | 135.731 | 24 | 23 | 107 | 0 | Overheating |
| 1954 | 99 | 30 | 137.825 | 27 | 26 | 130 | 0 | Engine |
| 1955 | 23 | 1 | 140.045 | 10 | 31 | 40 | 0 | Oil leak |
| Totals | | | | | | 402 | 0 | |

| Starts | 4 |
| Poles | 1 |
| Front Row | 1 |
| Wins | 0 |
| Top 5 | 0 |
| Top 10 | 0 |
| Retired | 3 |

- Although Hoyt started the 1955 race from the pole position, his qualifying speed ranked tenth behind fastest qualifier Jack McGrath. This is the lowest speed rank for a pole sitter in the Indianapolis modern era.

== Complete Formula One World Championship results ==
(key) (Races in bold indicate pole position; races in italics indicate fastest lap)

| Year | Entrant | Chassis | Engine | 1 | 2 | 3 | 4 | 5 | 6 | 7 | 8 | 9 | WDC | Points |
|---|---|---|---|---|---|---|---|---|---|---|---|---|---|---|
| 1950 | Ludson Morris | Kurtis Kraft | Offenhauser L4 | GBR | MON | 500; 21 | SUI | BEL | FRA | ITA | | | NC | 0 |
| 1951 | Pat Clancy | Ewing | Offenhauser L4 | SUI | 500; DNQ | BEL | FRA | GBR | GER | ITA | ESP | | NC | 0 |
| 1953 | John Zink | Kurtis Kraft | Offenhauser L4 | ARG | 500; 23* | NED | BEL | FRA | GBR | GER | SUI | ITA | NC | 0 |
| 1954 | Hoosier Racing | Kurtis Kraft | Offenhauser L4 | ARG | 500; 8 † | BEL | FRA | GBR | GER | | | | NC | 0 |
| 1955 | Jim Robbins | Stevens | Offenhauser L4 | ARG | MON | **500**; 31 | BEL | NED | GBR | ITA | | | NC | 0 |

- * Indicates shared drive with Andy Linden and Chuck Stevenson
- † Indicates shared drive with Paul Russo

== World Championship career summary ==
The Indianapolis 500 was part of the FIA World Championship from 1950 through 1960. Drivers competing at Indy during those years were credited with World Championship points and participation. Jerry Hoyt participated in 4 World Championship races, starting on the pole once but scoring no World Championship points.

Records
| Preceded by José Froilán González; 28 years, 282 days (1951 British GP) | Youngest Grand Prix polesitter 26 years, 121 days (1955 Indianapolis 500) | Succeeded by Eugenio Castellotti; 24 years, 238 days (1955 Belgian GP) |
