= Hans Herrmann =

German racing driver (1928–2026)

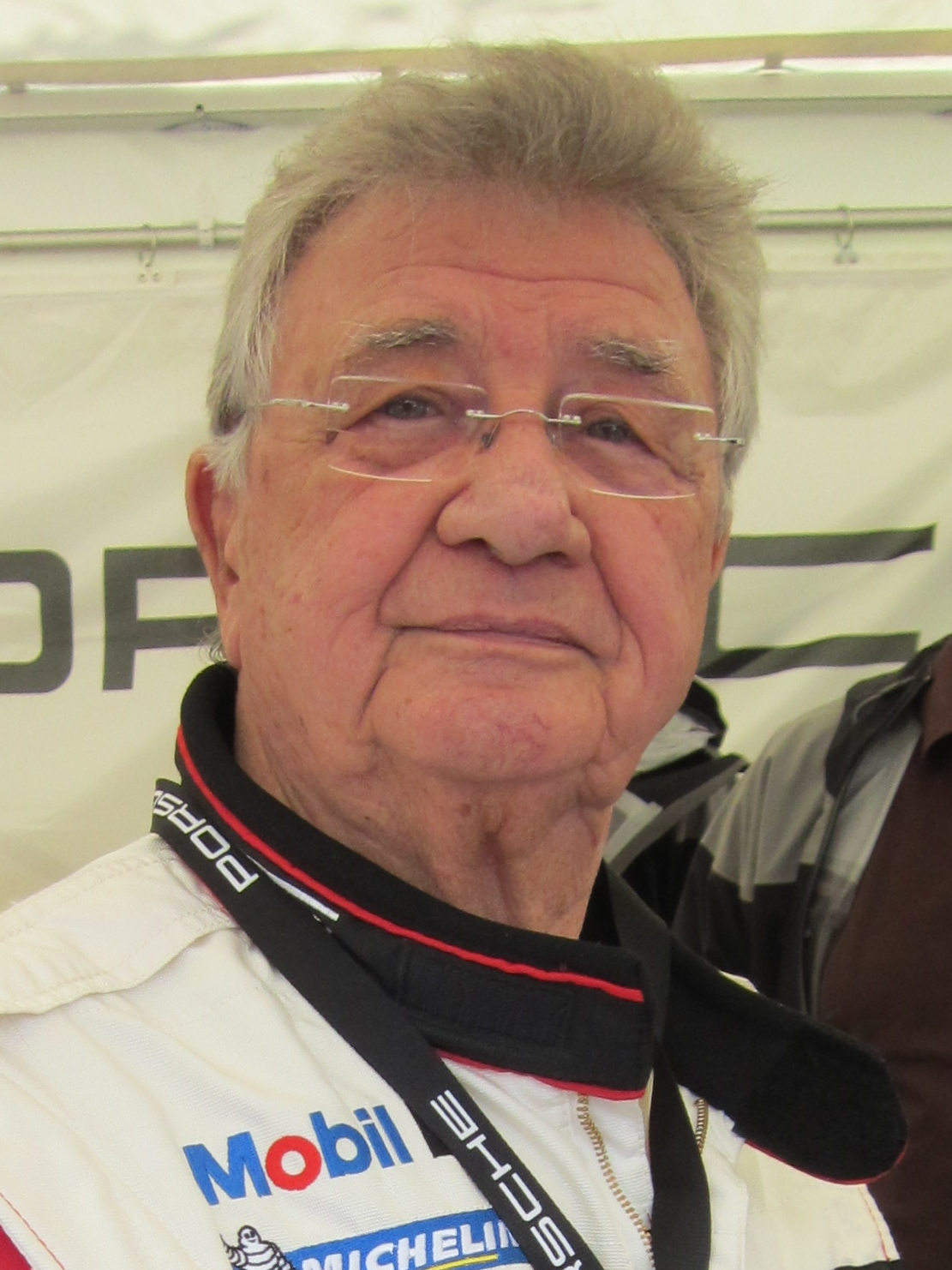
- Herrmann in 2011
- Born: 23 February 1928; Stuttgart, Württemberg, Germany
- Died: 9 January 2026 (aged 97); Germany

Formula One World Championship career
- Nationality: (Germany) German
- Active years: 1953–1955, 1957–1961, 1966, 1969
- Team(s): Veritas, Mercedes, Maserati, Cooper, BRM, Porsche
- Entries: 22 (18 starts)
- Championships: 0
- Wins: 0
- Podiums: 1
- Career points: 10
- Pole positions: 0
- Fastest laps: 1
- First entry: 1953 German Grand Prix
- Last entry: 1969 German Grand Prix

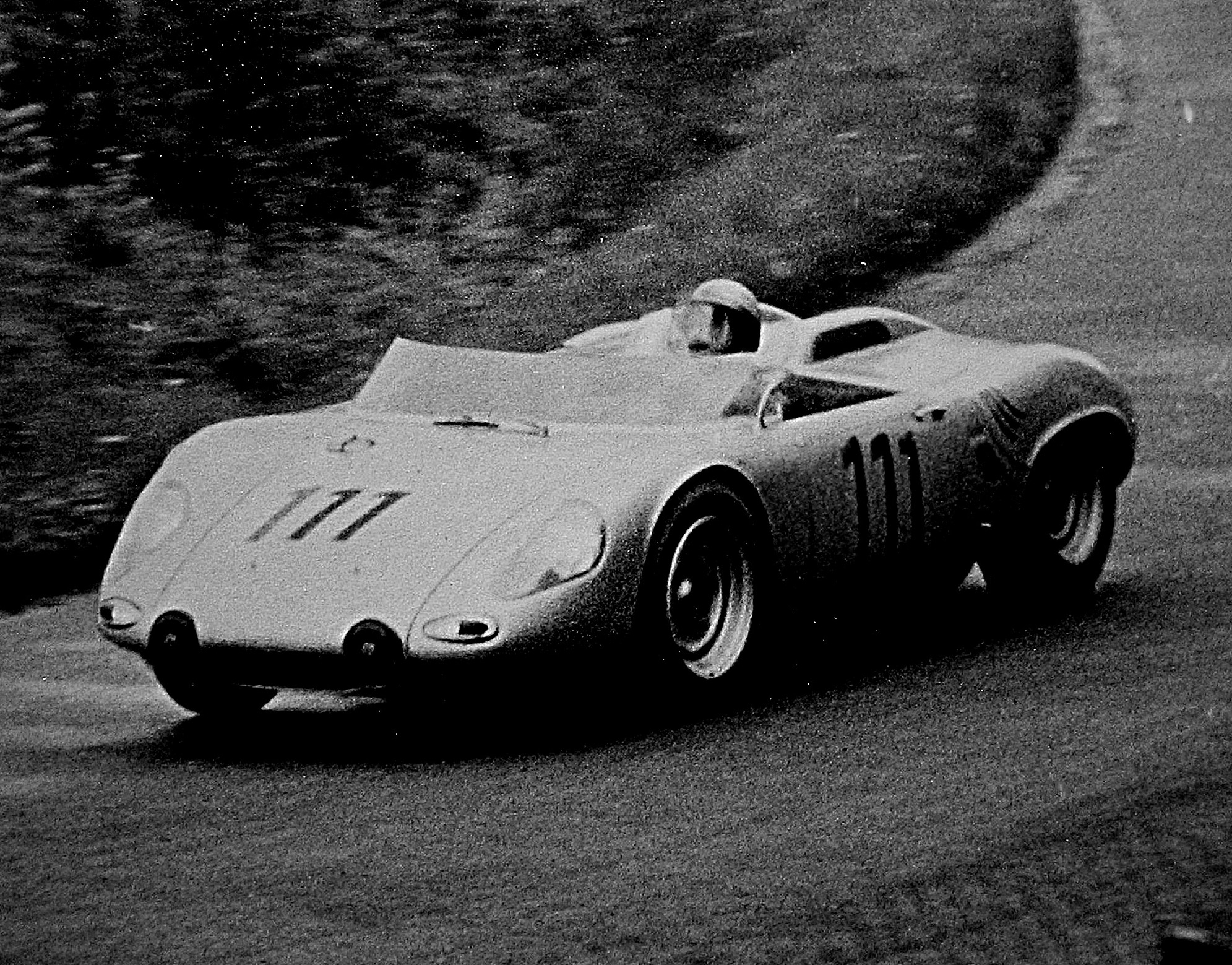
Hans Herrmann driving RS 61 at the Nürburgring 1962

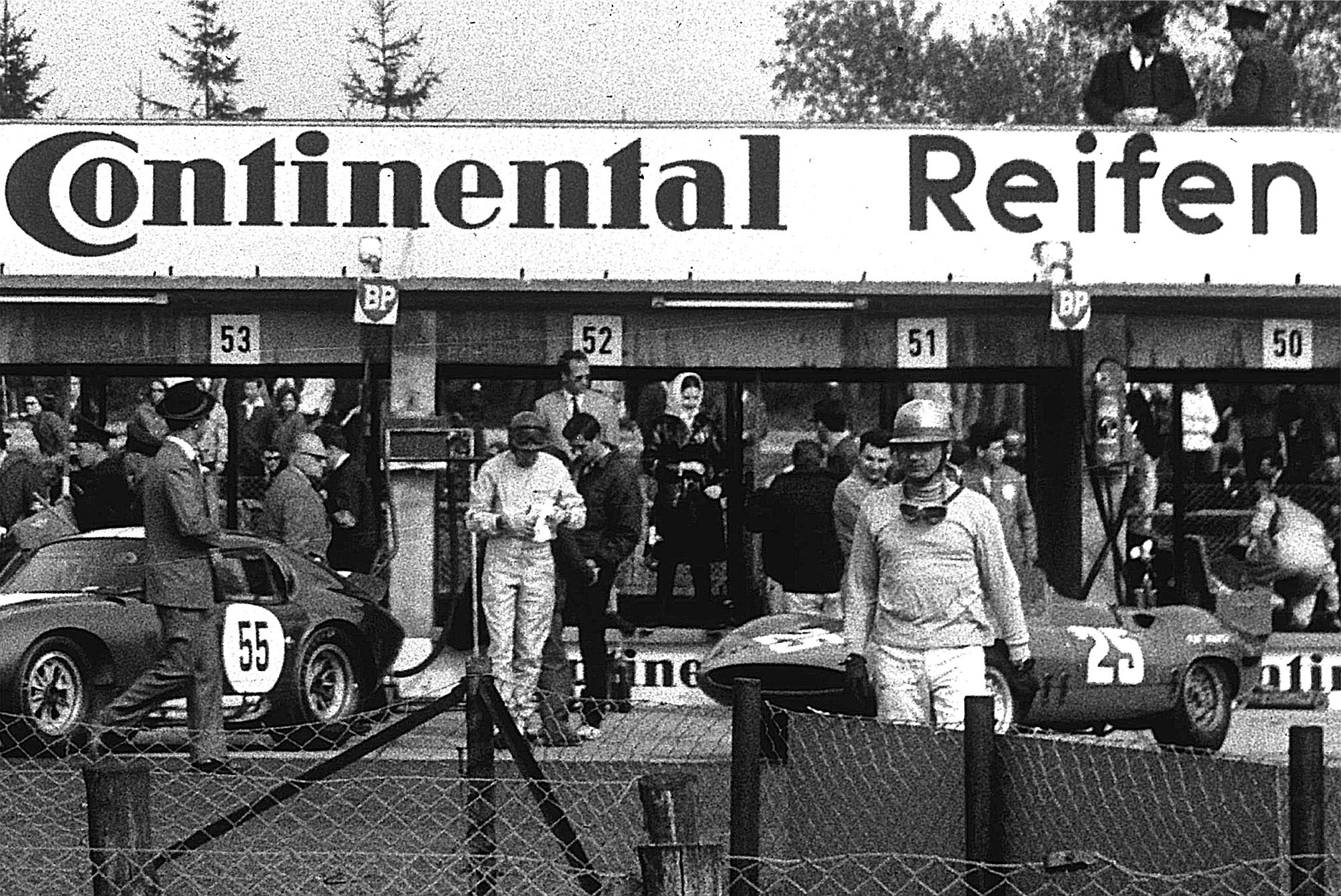
Hans Herrmann before the start of the 1965 1000km Nürburgring, behind him the Fiat Abarth

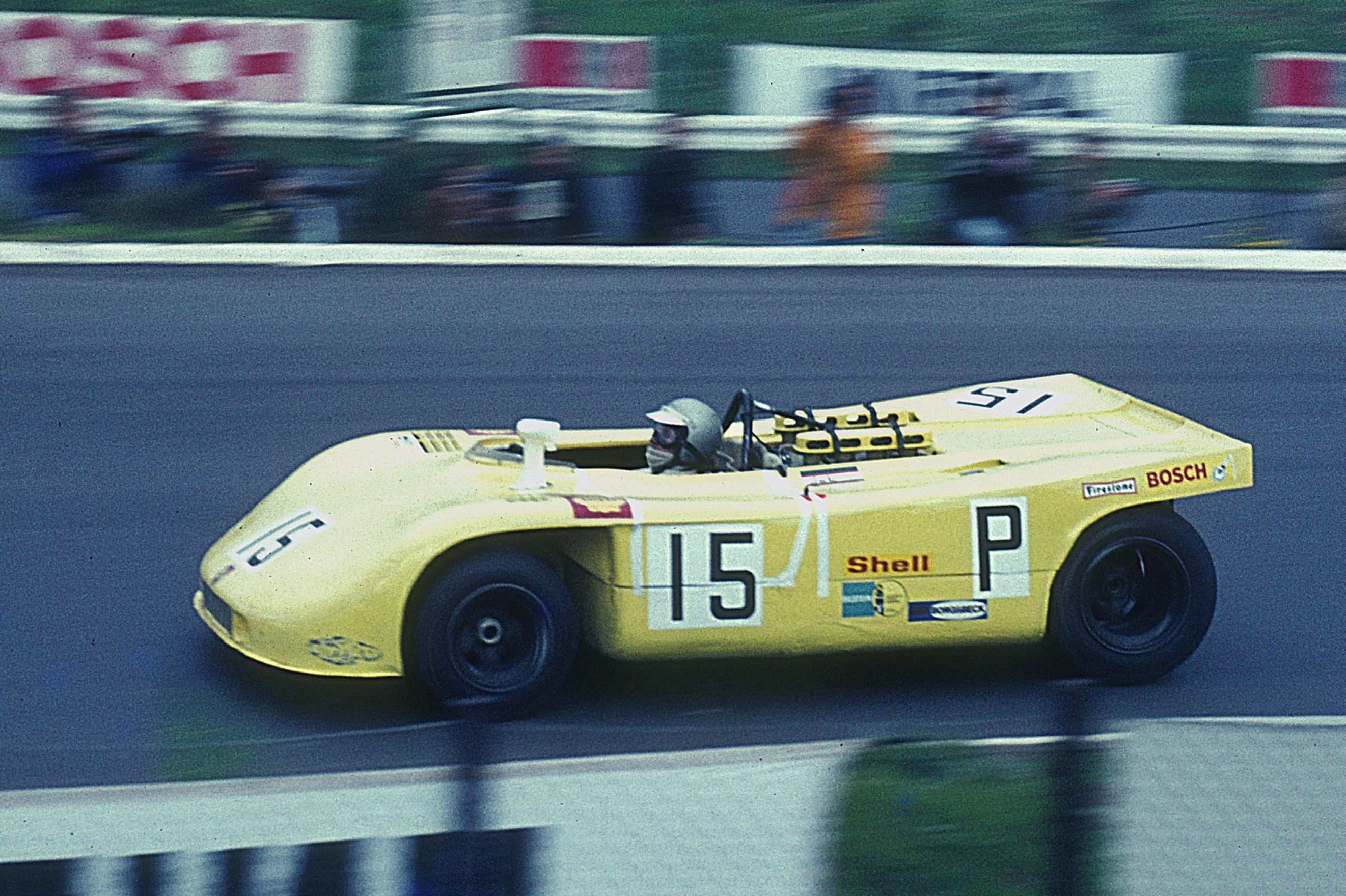
Hans Herrmann drives the 1970 Porsche 908/03

Hans Herrmann (23 February 1928 – 9 January 2026) was a German Formula One and sports car racing driver from Stuttgart.

In F1, Herrmann participated in 19 World Championship Grands Prix, debuting on 2 August 1953. He achieved one podium, and scored a total of 10 championship points.

In sports car racing, Herrmann also scored the first overall win at the 24 Hours of Le Mans for Porsche in 1970, in a Porsche 917.

After the death of Tony Brooks in 2022, Herrmann became the last surviving F1 podium finisher from the 1950s.

== Early career ==
The racing career of Herrmann, who was a baker by trade, spans from cooperation with pre-war legends like Alfred Neubauer to the beginning of the dominance of Porsche at the 24 Hours of Le Mans. He took part in now legendary road races like Mille Miglia, Targa Florio and Carrera Panamericana and was one of the few remaining witnesses of this era. Hans im Glück (lucky John) escaped from several spectacular incidents or accidents.

Herrmann had a remarkable Mille Miglia race in 1954, when the gates of a railroad crossing were lowered in the last moment before the fast train to Rome passed. Driving a very low Porsche 550 Spyder, Herrmann decided it was too late for a brake attempt anyway, knocked on the back of the helmet of his navigator Herbert Linge to make him duck, and they barely passed below the gates and before the train, to the surprise of the spectators.

== Mercedes-Benz ==
From 1954 to 1955, Herrmann was part of the Mercedes-Benz factory team, as a junior driver behind Juan Manuel Fangio, Karl Kling, Hermann Lang and later Stirling Moss. When the Silver Arrows came back for the 1954 French Grand Prix to score a 1–2 win, Herrmann drove the fastest lap but had to retire. A podium finish at the 1954 Swiss Grand Prix was his best result in that year as he had to use older versions of the Mercedes-Benz W196, or the least reliable car.

In the 1955 Argentine Grand Prix, his teammates Kling and Moss had to abandon early due to the extremely hot conditions on the southern hemisphere in January. Herrmann was called in to share his car with them for a fourth-place finish, giving one point each. Fangio won with two laps more. Herrmann was quick in the 1955 Mille Miglia with the Mercedes-Benz 300 SLR, comparably or even faster than Moss, but was less lucky than in 1954, as he had to abandon the race.

A crash in practice for the 1955 Monaco Grand Prix put Herrmann out for the ill-fated 1955 season, even though a comeback in the Targa Florio was intended.

== Various marques ==
The next years saw Herrmann racing for many marques, in F1 for Cooper, Maserati and BRM. In Berlin's AVUS during the 1959 German Grand Prix the brakes of his BRM failed, he crashed in a spectacular way, being thrown out of the car and sliding along the track with the car somersaulting in the air.

With different versions of the Porsche 718 being used as a sportscar and as a Formula Two car, Herrmann scored some wins for Porsche, mainly both the 1960 12 Hours of Sebring and 1960 Targa Florio. When the open wheeled single seater version of the 718, the Porsche 787 became eligible for Formula One in 1961 due to the rule changes, the results in F1 were disappointing. Herrmann finished 15th (last) in the 1961 Dutch Grand Prix, which was the first ever F1 World Championship race to have no retirements. He left Porsche at the beginning of the 1962 season feeling that he as a local from Stuttgart was No Prophet In His Own Land compared to Californian Dan Gurney and Jo Bonnier from Sweden. Gurney scored two F1 wins (one non-championship) with the new flat-8 Porsche 804, but Porsche retired from F1 anyway at the end of 1962, to return to GT and sportscar racing.

== Abarth ==
With the small cars of the Italian Abarth marque Herrmann spent 1962 to 1965 driving in minor races and hillclimbing events. He only took outright wins in lesser sports car racing events, such as at AVUS or the 500 km Nürburgring. The Abarths were hard to beat in their classes from 850cc to 1600cc, though. Being the only pro in a small team Herrmann learned a lot about testing and developing, which helped him later. However, being dissatisfied with the preparation of his car for the 1965 Schauinsland practice, Hans went home to witness the birth of his son, Dino. At the end of the year, he left Abarth for good to return to the manufacturer closer to his home.

== Porsche ==
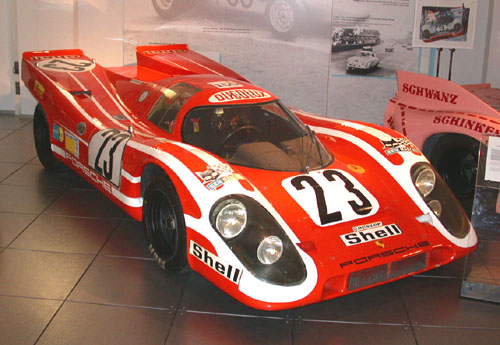
Porsche 917K 4.5L of Herrmann/Attwood, winner 1970 24 Hours of Le Mans

In 1966, Herrmann returned to Porsche for a comeback with the brand in which he had started his career in 1953. Led by the young engineer and grandson of Ferdinand Porsche, Ferdinand Piëch, Porsche started a serious effort in the 1966 World Sportscar Championship, with the Porsche 906 Carrera 6 that featured the first flat-6 engine, related to the one in the Porsche 911. It was run as a prototype until 50 were built and homologation as a Group 4 sportscar was completed. Starting the season in North America, Herrmann scored the best Porsche 906 results at the 1966 24 Hours of Daytona and the Sebring 12 Hours, important to win customers.

Following several podium finishes with the still underpowered two liter Porsche 906 and later models, he won the 1968 24 Hours of Daytona in a Porsche 907 as well as the Sebring 12 Hours again, now together with Swiss Jo Siffert. The overall win of the 1000km Nürburgring always eluded him, even though Herrmann had taken part in each of these races at the Nürburgring since they were introduced in 1953, and had finished second three times in a row from 1968 to 1970, behind teammates Jo Siffert and/or Vic Elford. Herrmann could not repeat a win at the Targa, a special race for which Porsche prepared its factory drivers with nauseating onboard films, and private early morning practise runs in the weeks before the race in May. At the 1969 Targa Florio Porsche entered no less than six brand new open top Porsche 908/02 for a dominating 1-2-3-4 finish.

Herrmann missed the win in the 1969 24 Hours of Le Mans with a Porsche 908 by only 120 meters , but it was he who finally scored the long-awaited first overall victory at the Le Mans 24 Hours for Porsche in 1970. He was assigned to Porsche Salzburg, the Austria-based factory-backed team owned by the Porsche family, which mainly entered cars painted red and white, the Austrian colors. In heavy rain, he and his teammate Richard Attwood survived with their Porsche 917K #23 as the best of only seven finishers.

== Retirement and death ==
Half jokingly, Herrmann had promised to his wife before the Le Mans race that he would retire in case of a win there. Having witnessed fatal accidents of colleagues too many times, e.g. before the 1969 German Grand Prix when his teammate and neighbor Gerhard Mitter died, the 42-year-old announced his retirement on TV, after having driven the winning car in a parade through Stuttgart from the factory to the town hall. To get out of his contract with Porsche Salzburg, Herrmann had to recommend a replacement driver to Louise Piëch.

Using his contacts, Herrmann built a successful company for automotive supplies. He was kidnapped once in the 1990s and kept in a car trunk for many hours before escaping.

Herrmann remained engaged in the racing community through his retirement, demonstrating historical cars at events such as the Solitude-Revival.

Herrmann died on 9 January 2026, at the age of 97.

== Racing record ==
=== Complete 24 Hours of Le Mans results ===
Year	Team	Co-Drivers	Car	Class	Laps	Pos.	Class Pos.
1953	(West Germany) Porsche KG	(West Germany) Helmut Glöckler	Porsche 550 Coupé	S 1.5	247	16th	2nd
1954	(West Germany) Porsche KG	(West Germany) Helmut Polensky	Porsche 550/4 RS 1500 Spyder	S 1.5	148	DNF	DNF
1956	(West Germany) Porsche KG	(Italy) Umberto Maglioli	Porsche 550A/4 RS	S 1.5	136	DNF	DNF
1957	(West Germany) Automobiles Porsche	(West Germany) Richard von Frankenberg	Porsche 500A RS	S 1.5	87	DNF	DNF
1958	(West Germany) Porsche KG	(France) Jean Behra	Porsche 718 RSK Spyder	S 2.0	291	3rd	1st
1959	(West Germany) Porsche KG	(Italy) Umberto Maglioli	Porsche 718 RSK	S 2.0	78	DNF	DNF
1960	(West Germany) Porsche KG	(France) Maurice Trintignant	Porsche 718 RS 60	S 2.0	57	DNF	DNF
1961	(Germany) Porsche System Engineering	(Germany) Edgar Barth	Porsche 718/4 RS Coupe	S 2.0	306	7th	2nd
1962	(Germany) Porsche System Engineering	(Germany) Edgar Barth	Porsche 356B Abarth	GT 1.6	287	7th	1st
1966	(Germany) Porsche System Engineering	(Germany) Herbert Linge	Porsche 906/6L Carrera 6	P 2.0	338	5th	2nd
1967	(West Germany) Porsche System Engineering	(Switzerland) Jo Siffert	Porsche 907/6L	P 2.0	358	5th	1st
1968	(West Germany) Porsche System Engineering	(Switzerland) Jo Siffert	Porsche 908	P 3.0	59	DNF	DNF
1969	(West Germany) Porsche System Engineering	(France) Gérard Larrousse	Porsche 908 Coupé	P 3.0	372	2nd	1st
1970	(Austria) Porsche KG Salzburg	(United Kingdom) Richard Attwood	Porsche 917K	S 5.0	343	1st	1st

=== Complete Formula One World Championship results ===
(key) (Races in italics indicate fastest lap)

Year	Entrant	Chassis	Engine	1	2	3	4	5	6	7	8	9	10	11	WDC	Pts
1953	Hans Herrmann	Veritas Meteor	Veritas 2.0 L6	ARG	500	NED	BEL	FRA	GBR	GER; 9	SUI	ITA			NC	0
1954	Daimler Benz AG	Mercedes-Benz W196	Mercedes M196 2.5 L8	ARG	500	BEL	FRA; Ret	GBR	GER; Ret	SUI; 3	ITA; 4	ESP; Ret			7th	8
1955	Daimler Benz AG	Mercedes-Benz W196	Mercedes M196 2.5 L8	ARG; 4^{1}	MON; DNQ	500	BEL	NED	GBR	ITA					22nd	1
1957	Officine Alfieri Maserati	Maserati 250F	Maserati 250F1 2.5 L6	ARG	MON; DNQ	500	FRA	GBR							NC	0
1957	Scuderia Centro Sud	Maserati 250F	Maserati 250F1 2.5 L6						GER; Ret	PES	ITA				NC	0
1958	Scuderia Centro Sud	Maserati 250F	Maserati 250F1 2.5 L6	ARG	MON	NED	500	BEL	FRA	GBR	GER; Ret	POR			NC	0
1958	Jo Bonnier	Maserati 250F	Maserati 250F1 2.5 L6										ITA; Ret	MOR; 9	NC	0
1959	Scuderia Centro Sud	Cooper T51	Maserati 250S 2.5 L4	MON	500	NED	FRA	GBR; Ret							NC	0
1959	British Racing Partnership	BRM P25	BRM P25 2.5 L4						GER; Ret	POR	ITA	USA			NC	0
1960	Porsche System Engineering	Porsche 718	Porsche 547/3 1.5 F4	ARG	MON	500	NED	BEL	FRA	GBR	POR	ITA; 6	USA		28th	1
1961	Porsche System Engineering	Porsche 718	Porsche 547/3 1.5 F4	MON; 9					GER; 13	ITA	USA				NC	0
1961	Ecurie Maarsbergen	Porsche 718	Porsche 547/3 1.5 F4		NED; 15	BEL	FRA; WD	GBR							NC	0
1966	Roy Winkelmann Racing	Brabham BT18 (F2)	Ford Cosworth SCA 1.0 L4	MON	BEL	FRA	GBR	NED	GER; 11	ITA	USA	MEX			NC	0
1969	Roy Winkelmann Racing	Lotus 59B (F2)	Ford Cosworth FVA 1.6 L4	RSA	ESP	MON	NED	FRA	GBR	GER; WD	CAN	ITA	USA	MEX	NC	0

Notes

- ^1 – Shared drive with Karl Kling and Stirling Moss

Sporting positions
Preceded by Jacky Ickx; Jackie Oliver	Winner of the 24 Hours of Le Mans; 1970; With: Richard Attwood	Succeeded by Helmut Marko; Gijs van Lennep
Records
Preceded by José Froilán González; 29 years, 338 days (1952 Italian GP)	Youngest driver to set fastest lap in Formula One; 26 years, 131 days (1954 French Grand Prix)	Succeeded by Stirling Moss; 24 years, 303 days (1954 British GP)
