= 1955 Valentino Grand Prix =

- Non-championship race in the 1955 Formula One season
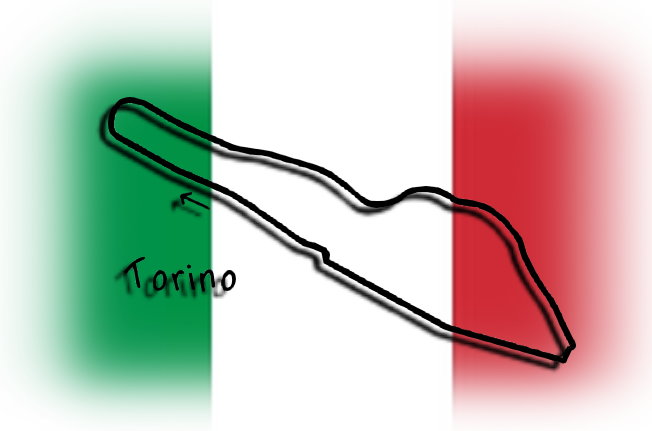

Race details
- Date: 27 March 1955
- Official name: VII Gran Premio del Valentino
- Location: Parco del Valentino, Turin
- Course: Temporary Street Circuit
- Course length: 4.185 km (2.609 miles)
- Distance: 90 laps, 376.635 km (234.810 miles)

Pole position
Driver	(Italy) Alberto Ascari	Lancia D50
- Time: 1:42.0

Fastest lap
Driver	(France) Jean Behra	Maserati 250F
- Time: 1:43.1

Podium
First	(Italy) Alberto Ascari	Lancia D50
Second	(Argentina) Roberto Mieres	Maserati 250F
Third	(Italy) Luigi Villoresi	Lancia D50

The 1955 Gran Premio del Valentino was a non-championship Formula One motor race held on 27 March 1955 at the Parco del Valentino in Turin. The Grand Prix was won by Alberto Ascari driving a Lancia D50; Ascari also set pole position. Roberto Mieres in a Maserati 250F finished second and Luigi Villoresi in a Lancia D50 was third. Maserati driver Jean Behra set fastest lap.

This was the last motor race to be held at the Parco del Valentino.

== Classification ==
=== Race ===
Pos	No	Driver	Entrant	Car	Time/Retired	Grid
1	6	(Italy) Alberto Ascari	Scuderia Lancia	Lancia D50	2:40:21.2, 87.86mph	1
2	32	(Argentina) Roberto Mieres	Officine Alfieri Maserati	Maserati 250F	+27.1s	5
3	30	(Italy) Luigi Villoresi	Scuderia Lancia	Lancia D50	+1:44.2	6
4	22	(Italy) Eugenio Castellotti	Scuderia Lancia	Lancia D50	+1:44.8	8
5	20	(United States) Harry Schell	Scuderia Ferrari	Ferrari 625	+3 laps	9
6	36	(Italy) Louis Rosier	Equipe Rosier	Maserati 250F	+11 laps	12
7	26	(Italy) Berardo Taraschi	Berardo Taraschi	Ferrari 166	+11 laps	14
8	18	(France) Maurice Trintignant	Scuderia Ferrari	Ferrari 625	+15 laps, rear axle	7
14	20	(Thailand) B. Bira	Prince Bira	Maserati 250F	+24 laps	13
Ret	12	(Italy) Lorenzo Girard	Lorenzo Girard	Ferrari 500	44 laps, mechanical	15
Ret	10	(Spain) Alfonso de Portago	Marquis de Portago	Ferrari 625	34 laps, sump	11
Ret	34	(Italy) Luigi Musso	Officine Alfieri Maserati	Maserati 250F	21 laps, oil leak	3
Ret	8	(France) Jean Behra	Officine Alfieri Maserati	Maserati 250F	12 laps, suspension	2
Ret	24	(Italy) Cesare Perdisa	Officine Alfieri Maserati	Maserati 250F	12 laps, suspension	10
DNS	4	(Italy) Sergio Mantovani	Officine Alfieri Maserati	Maserati 250F	Crash	-
DNA	16	(Switzerland) Ottorino Volonterio	Ottorino Volonterio	Maserati A6GCM	Car not ready	-
DNA	28	(Italy) Mario Alborghetti	Scuderia Volpini	Maserati 4CLT/48	Car not ready	-

Previous race: 1954 Daily Telegraph Trophy	Formula One non-championship races 1955 season	Next race: 1955 Pau Grand Prix
Previous race: 1952 Valentino Grand Prix	Valentino Grand Prix	Next race: —
