= Ted Whiteaway =

British racing driver (1928–1995)

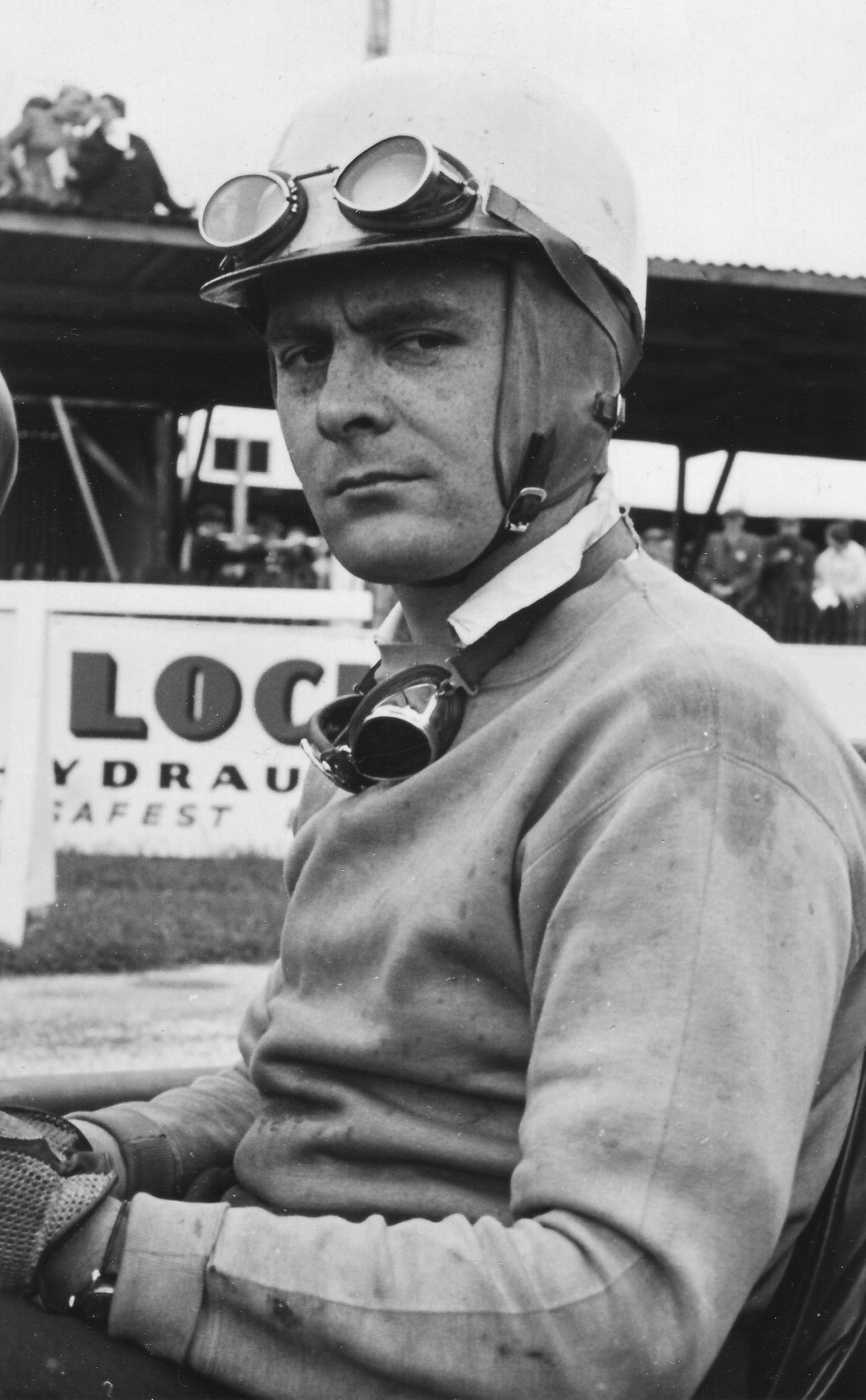
- Whiteaway in his racing days
- Born: 1 November 1928; Feltham, Middlesex, England
- Died: 18 October 1995 (aged 66); Perth, Australia

Formula One World Championship career
- Nationality: (United Kingdom) British
- Active years: 1955
- Team: privateer HWM
- Entries: 1 (0 starts)
- Championships: 0
- Wins: 0
- Podiums: 0
- Career points: 0
- Pole positions: 0
- Fastest laps: 0
- First entry: 1955 Monaco Grand Prix

Edward Norton Whiteaway (1 November 1928 – 18 October 1995) was a British racing driver from England, who raced from 1951 to 1963. His single World Championship Formula One entry was at the 1955 Monaco Grand Prix in his privately entered HWM, but he failed to qualify. He also competed in some non-Championship Formula One races.

At Le Mans in 1959, Whiteaway teamed up with John Turner in Mrs. Waugh's ACE Bristol. They won the 2 litre class and came seventh overall.

== Complete Formula One World Championship results ==
(key)

Year	Entrant	Chassis	Engine	1	2	3	4	5	6	7	WDC	Points
1955	E N Whiteaway	HWM 54	Alta Straight-4	ARG	MON; DNQ	500	BEL	NED	GBR	ITA	NC	0

== Sources ==
All Formula One World Championship race results are taken from "The Official Formula 1 website".
