= 1955 Formula One season =

9th season of FIA's Formula One motor racing

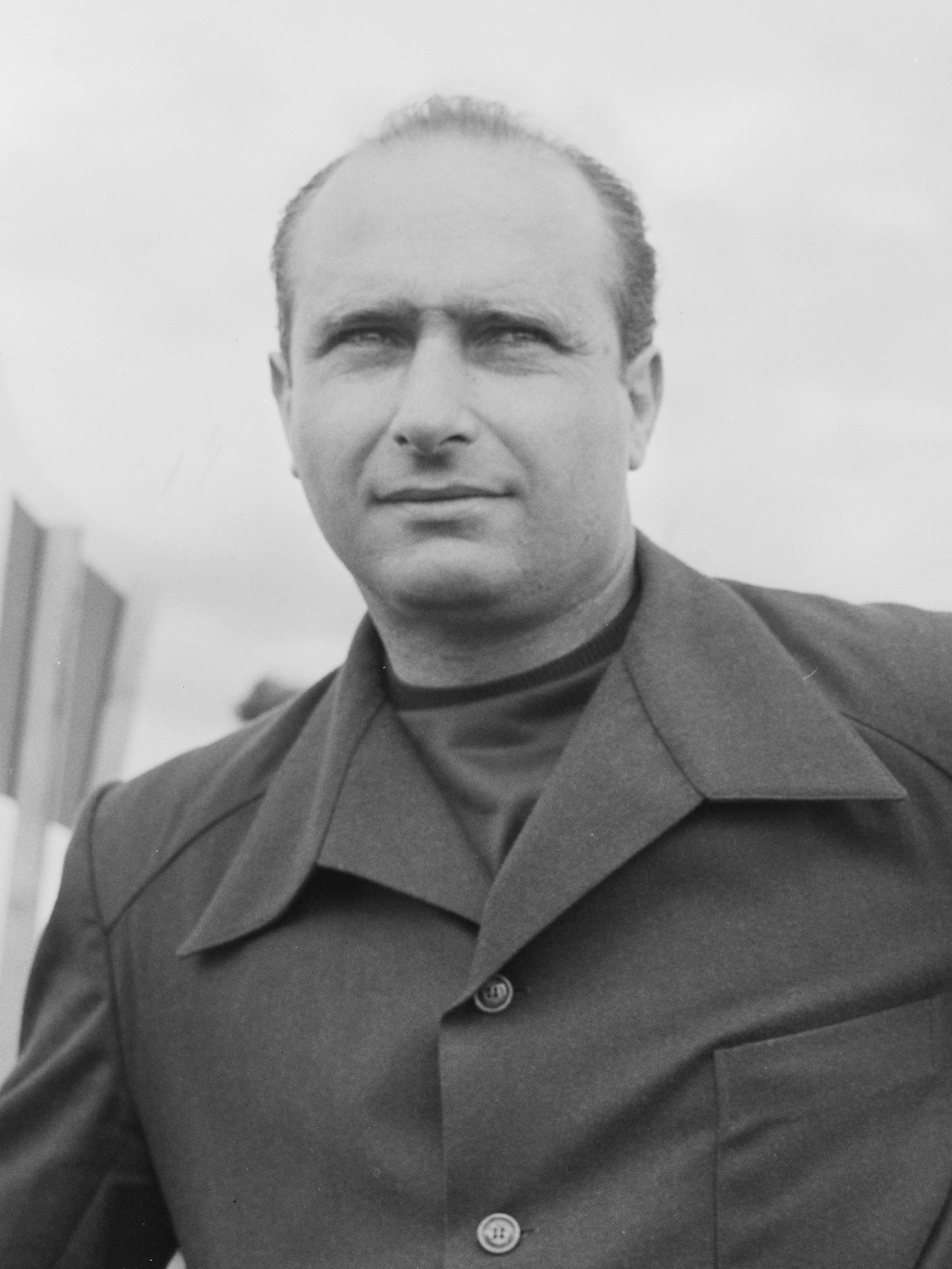
Juan Manuel Fangio driving for Mercedes won a then record-breaking third Drivers' Championship.

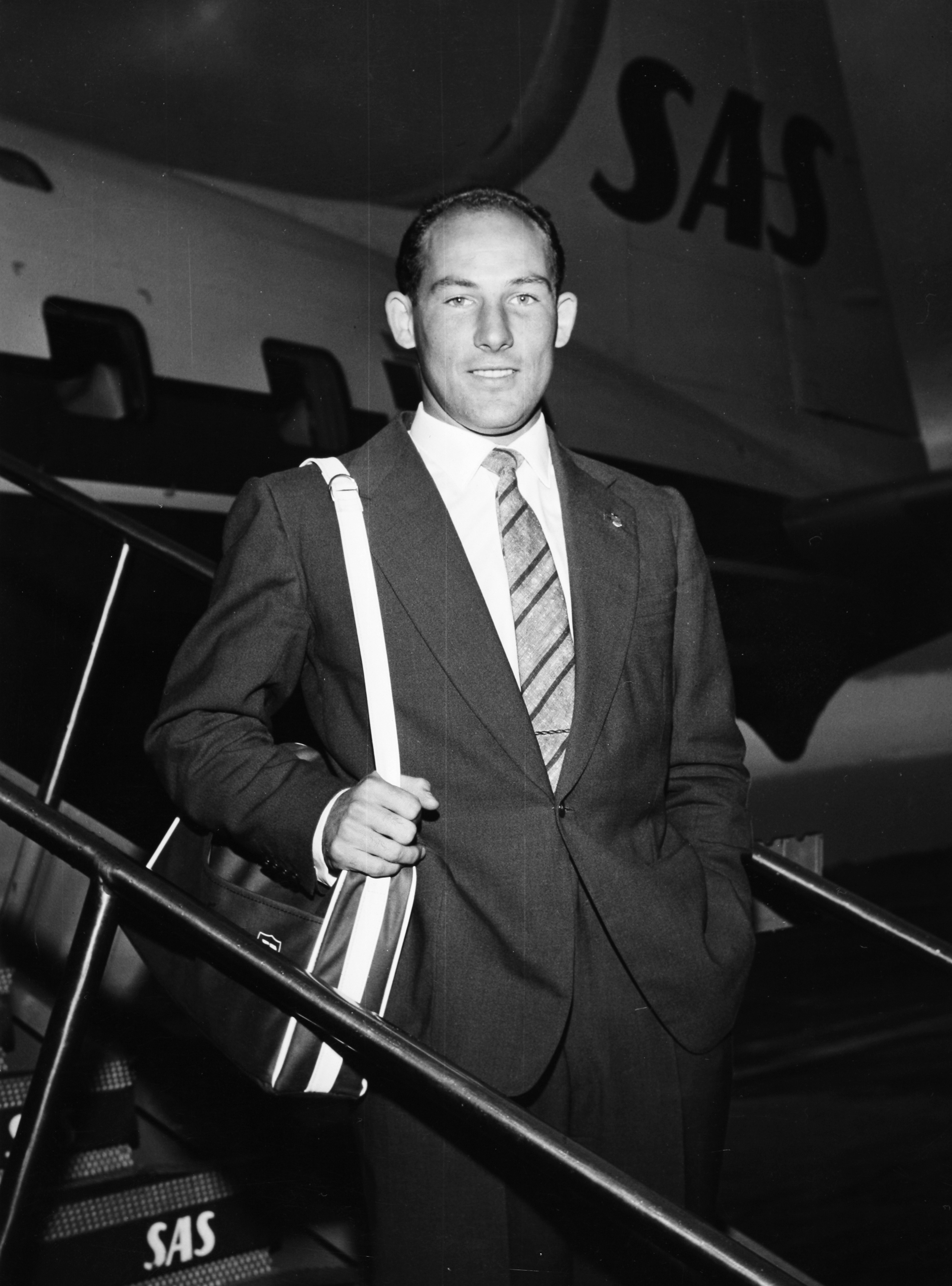
Fangio's teammate Stirling Moss finished runner-up in the World Championship of Drivers.

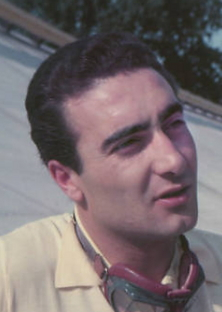
Eugenio Castellotti finished third in the World Championship of Drivers.

The 1955 Formula One season was the ninth season of FIA Formula One motor racing. It featured the sixth World Championship of Drivers, which was contested over seven races between 16 January and 11 September 1955. The season also included several non-championship races for Formula One cars.

Juan Manuel Fangio won his second consecutive World Championship title, his third in total. This was the last championship for a Mercedes driver until Lewis Hamilton in 2014.

The season was coloured by tragedy. Two drivers were killed during the 1955 Indianapolis 500: Manny Ayulo and Bill Vukovich, winner of the two previous editions. Italian Mario Alborghetti died at the non-championship Pau Grand Prix. Alberto Ascari, World Champion of 1952 and 1953, was killed while testing a Ferrari 750 Monza at Monza. Four Grands Prix were cancelled after ex-Formula One driver Pierre Levegh was killed in the 1955 Le Mans disaster, along with 83 spectators. As of 2026, with just seven rounds completed during the season, the 1955 World Championship Grand Prix season jointly holds the record (along with the inaugural World Championship of Drivers season in 1950) for the fewest World Championship races held in a year for Grand Prix cars in the history of what is today referred to as the Formula One World Championship.

== Teams and drivers ==
The following teams and drivers competed in the 1955 FIA World Championship. The list does not include those who only contested the Indianapolis 500.

Entrant	Constructor	Chassis	Engine	Tyre	Driver	Rounds
(West Germany) Daimler Benz AG	Mercedes	W196	Mercedes M196 2.5 L8	C	(Argentina) Juan Manuel Fangio	1–2, 4–7
(West Germany) Daimler Benz AG	Mercedes	W196	Mercedes M196 2.5 L8	C	(West Germany) Karl Kling	1, 4–7
(West Germany) Daimler Benz AG	Mercedes	W196	Mercedes M196 2.5 L8	C	(United Kingdom) Stirling Moss	1–2, 4–7
(West Germany) Daimler Benz AG	Mercedes	W196	Mercedes M196 2.5 L8	C	(West Germany) Hans Herrmann	1–2
(West Germany) Daimler Benz AG	Mercedes	W196	Mercedes M196 2.5 L8	C	(France) André Simon	2
(West Germany) Daimler Benz AG	Mercedes	W196	Mercedes M196 2.5 L8	C	(Italy) Piero Taruffi	6–7
(Italy) Scuderia Ferrari	Ferrari	625; 555	Ferrari 555 2.5 L4	E	(Italy) Umberto Maglioli	1, 7
(Italy) Scuderia Ferrari	Ferrari	625; 555	Ferrari 555 2.5 L4	E	(Argentina) José Froilán González	1
(Italy) Scuderia Ferrari	Ferrari	625; 555	Ferrari 555 2.5 L4	E	(France) Maurice Trintignant	1–2, 4–7
(Italy) Scuderia Ferrari	Ferrari	625; 555	Ferrari 555 2.5 L4	E	(United States) Harry Schell	2, 4
(Italy) Scuderia Ferrari	Ferrari	625; 555	Ferrari 555 2.5 L4	E	(Italy) Piero Taruffi	2, 4
(Italy) Scuderia Ferrari	Ferrari	625; 555	Ferrari 555 2.5 L4	E	(Belgium) Paul Frère	2, 4
(Italy) Scuderia Ferrari	Ferrari	625; 555	Ferrari 555 2.5 L4	E	(United Kingdom) Mike Hawthorn	5–7
(Italy) Scuderia Ferrari	Ferrari	625; 555	Ferrari 555 2.5 L4	E	(Italy) Eugenio Castellotti	5–7
(Italy) Scuderia Ferrari	Ferrari	625; 555	Ferrari 555 2.5 L4	E	(Italy) Giuseppe Farina	1–2, 4
(Italy) Scuderia Ferrari	Lancia	D50	Lancia DS50 2.5 V8	E	(Italy) Giuseppe Farina	7
(Italy) Officine Alfieri Maserati	Maserati	250F	Maserati 250F1 2.5 L6	P	(France) Jean Behra	1–2, 4–7
(Italy) Officine Alfieri Maserati	Maserati	250F	Maserati 250F1 2.5 L6	P	(Argentina) Roberto Mieres	1–2, 4–7
(Italy) Officine Alfieri Maserati	Maserati	250F	Maserati 250F1 2.5 L6	P	(Italy) Sergio Mantovani	1
(Italy) Officine Alfieri Maserati	Maserati	250F	Maserati 250F1 2.5 L6	P	(Italy) Luigi Musso	1–2, 4–7
(Italy) Officine Alfieri Maserati	Maserati	250F	Maserati 250F1 2.5 L6	P	(Argentina) Carlos Menditeguy	1, 7
(Italy) Officine Alfieri Maserati	Maserati	250F	Maserati 250F1 2.5 L6	P	(Argentina) Clemar Bucci	1
(Italy) Officine Alfieri Maserati	Maserati	250F	Maserati 250F1 2.5 L6	P	(United States) Harry Schell	1
(Italy) Officine Alfieri Maserati	Maserati	250F	Maserati 250F1 2.5 L6	P	(Italy) Cesare Perdisa	2, 4
(Italy) Officine Alfieri Maserati	Maserati	250F	Maserati 250F1 2.5 L6	P	(France) André Simon	6
(Italy) Officine Alfieri Maserati	Maserati	250F	Maserati 250F1 2.5 L6	P	(United Kingdom) Peter Collins	7
(Italy) Officine Alfieri Maserati	Maserati	250F	Maserati 250F1 2.5 L6	P	(United Kingdom) Horace Gould	7
(Uruguay) Alberto Uría	Maserati	A6GCM	Maserati 250F1 2.5 L6	P	(Uruguay) Alberto Uría	1
(Italy) Scuderia Lancia	Lancia	D50	Lancia DS50 2.5 V8	P	(Italy) Alberto Ascari	1–2
(Italy) Scuderia Lancia	Lancia	D50	Lancia DS50 2.5 V8	P	(Italy) Luigi Villoresi	1–2, 7
(Italy) Scuderia Lancia	Lancia	D50	Lancia DS50 2.5 V8	P	(Italy) Eugenio Castellotti	1–2, 4
(Italy) Scuderia Lancia	Lancia	D50	Lancia DS50 2.5 V8	P	(Monaco) Louis Chiron	2
(France) Equipe Gordini	Gordini	T16	Gordini 23 2.5 L6	E	(France) Élie Bayol	1–2
(France) Equipe Gordini	Gordini	T16	Gordini 23 2.5 L6	E	(Argentina) Pablo Birger	1
(France) Equipe Gordini	Gordini	T16	Gordini 23 2.5 L6	E	(Argentina) Jesús Iglesias	1
(France) Equipe Gordini	Gordini	T16	Gordini 23 2.5 L6	E	(France) Robert Manzon	2, 5–6
(France) Equipe Gordini	Gordini	T16	Gordini 23 2.5 L6	E	(France) Jacques Pollet	2, 5, 7
(France) Equipe Gordini	Gordini	T16	Gordini 23 2.5 L6	E	(Brazil) Hermano da Silva Ramos	5–7
(France) Equipe Gordini	Gordini	T16	Gordini 23 2.5 L6	E	(France) Mike Sparken	6
(France) Equipe Gordini	Gordini	T16	Gordini 23 2.5 L6	E	(France) Jean Lucas	7
(France) Ecurie Rosier	Maserati	250F	Maserati 250F1 2.5 L6	P	(France) Louis Rosier	2, 4–5
(United Kingdom) Vandervell Products	Vanwall	VW 55	Vanwall 254 2.5 L4	P	(United Kingdom) Mike Hawthorn	2, 4
(United Kingdom) Vandervell Products	Vanwall	VW 55	Vanwall 254 2.5 L4	P	(United Kingdom) Ken Wharton	6–7
(United Kingdom) Vandervell Products	Vanwall	VW 55	Vanwall 254 2.5 L4	P	(United States) Harry Schell	6–7
(United Kingdom) Stirling Moss Ltd	Maserati	250F	Maserati 250F1 2.5 L6	D	(United Kingdom) Lance Macklin	2, 6
(United Kingdom) Stirling Moss Ltd	Maserati	250F	Maserati 250F1 2.5 L6	D	(Belgium) Johnny Claes	4
(United Kingdom) Stirling Moss Ltd	Maserati	250F	Maserati 250F1 2.5 L6	D	(United Kingdom) Peter Walker	5
(United Kingdom) Stirling Moss Ltd	Maserati	250F	Maserati 250F1 2.5 L6	D	(United States) John Fitch	7
(United Kingdom) E.N. Whiteaway	HWM-Alta	53	Alta GP 2.5 L4	D	(United Kingdom) Ted Whiteaway	2
(Belgium) Equipe Nationale Belge	Ferrari	625	Ferrari 625 2.5 L4	E	(Belgium) Johnny Claes	5
(United Kingdom) Gould's Garage (Bristol)	Maserati	250F	Maserati 250F1 2.5 L6	D	(United Kingdom) Horace Gould	5–6
(United Kingdom) Connaught Engineering	Connaught-Alta	B	Alta GP 2.5 L4	D	(United Kingdom) Kenneth McAlpine	6
(United Kingdom) Connaught Engineering	Connaught-Alta	B	Alta GP 2.5 L4	D	(United Kingdom) Jack Fairman	6
(United Kingdom) R.R.C. Walker Racing Team	Connaught-Alta	B	Alta GP 2.5 L4	D	(United Kingdom) Tony Rolt	6
(United Kingdom) R.R.C. Walker Racing Team	Connaught-Alta	B	Alta GP 2.5 L4	D	(United Kingdom) Peter Walker	6
(United Kingdom) Leslie Marr	Connaught-Alta	B	Alta GP 2.5 L4	D	(United Kingdom) Leslie Marr	6
(United Kingdom) Cooper Car Company	Cooper-Bristol	T40	Bristol BS1 2.0 L6	D	(Australia) Jack Brabham	6
(United Kingdom) Owen Racing Organisation	Maserati	250F	Maserati 250F1 2.5 L6	D	(United Kingdom) Peter Collins	6
(United Kingdom) Gilby Engineering	Maserati	250F	Maserati 250F1 2.5 L6	D	(United Kingdom) Roy Salvadori	6
(Italy) Scuderia Volpini	Arzani-Volpini-Maserati	F1	Maserati 4CLT 2.5 L4	P	(Italy) Luigi Piotti	7

=== Team and driver changes ===
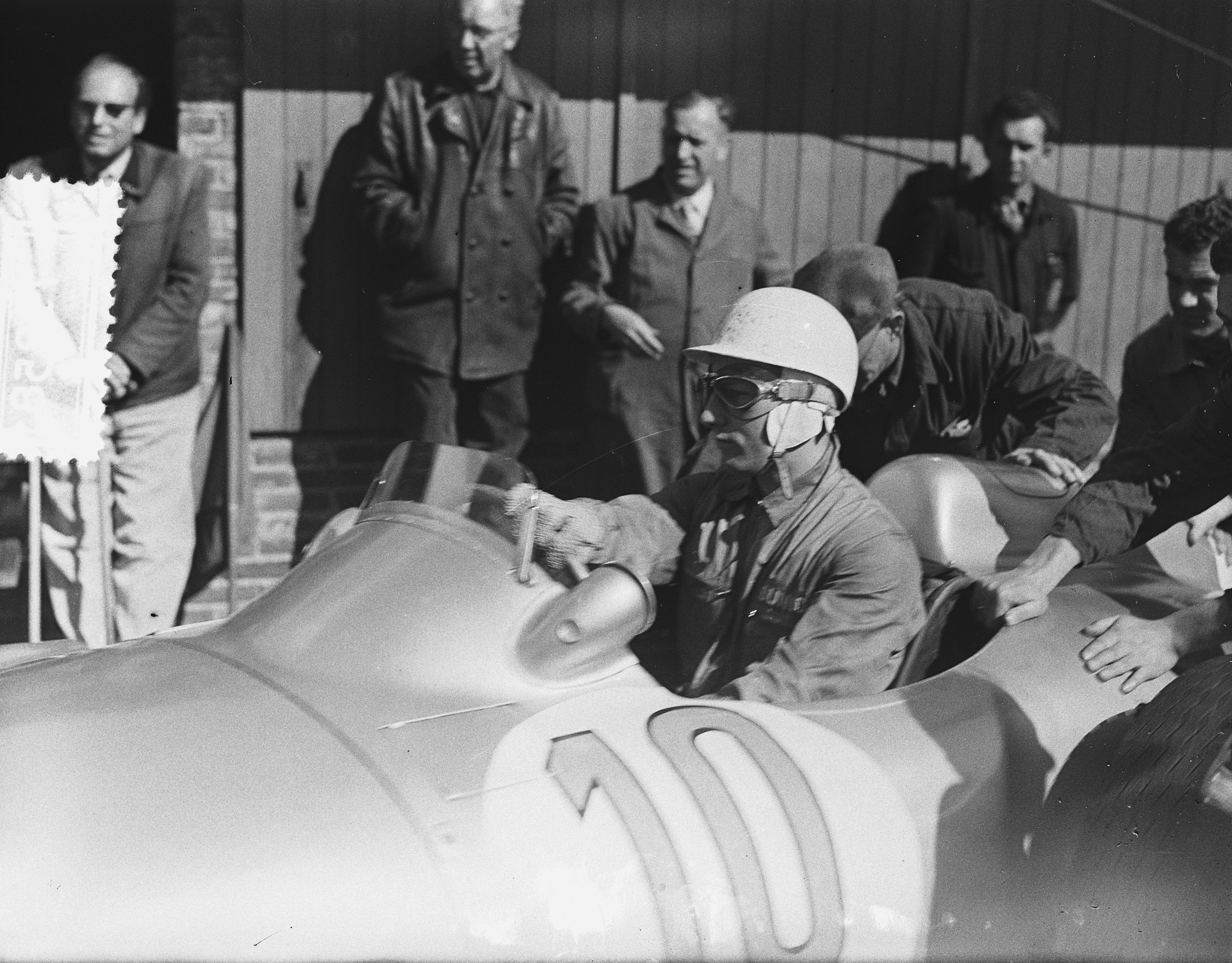
Stirling Moss joined Juan Manuel Fangio at Mercedes.

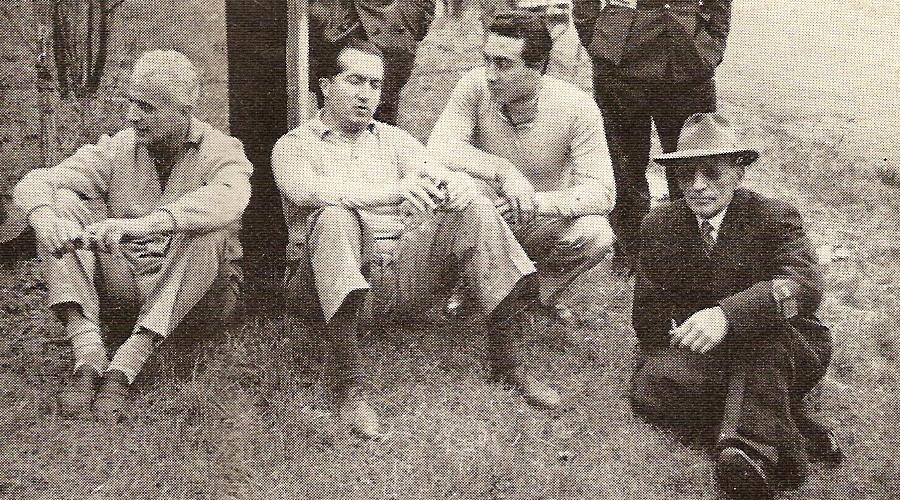
The three drivers of the Lancia team (left Luigi Villoresi, middle Alberto Ascari, right Eugenio Castellotti), with their engineer Vittorio Jano (far right).

- Stirling Moss moved from Maserati to Mercedes, like Juan Manuel Fangio had done already during the 1954 season.
- Maserati hired Jean Behra from Gordini, after which the French team reunited with Robert Manzon, their driver from 1953 and the years before.
- Vanwall hired Mike Hawthorn from Ferrari, so Peter Collins moved to Owen Racing Organisation, which would later become British Racing Motors.
- Lancia had made their debut at the end of 1954 and entered the 1955 season with full-time ambitions. They were able to hire top-class drivers Alberto Ascari, Luigi Villoresi and Eugenio Castellotti.

==== Mid-season changes ====
- Maserati driver Sergio Mantovani lost a leg in a crash during practice for the non-championship Valentino Grand Prix. The team hired Cesare Perdisa, who finished third on his debut.
- Peter Collins had been driving a Maserati 250F for Owen Racing Organisation when Maserati's team leader, impressed with his results, offered him a seat at the works team, starting at the Italian Grand Prix. However, Collins parted with the team after just one race, as Ferrari offered him a seat for 1956.
- André Simon substituted for Mercedes driver Karl Kling in the Monaco Grand Prix.
- Double World Champion Alberto Ascari lost his life while testing a Ferrari 750 Monza at Monza. Along with serious financial troubles, this led to Lancia's team owner to halt operations and hand all assets to Enzo Ferrari. Ferrari brought back Mike Hawthorn to drive, after the Brit had spent half a year with Vanwall.
- The 1955 24 Hours of Le Mans did not only see tragedy during the race: in Friday practice, Élie Bayol (driving in F1 for Gordini) had to avoid two spectators crossing the road. This caused him to have a severe crash, suffering a fractured skull and broken vertebrae. He was out of racing for the rest of the year, so the Gordini team hired sports car and rally driver Hermano da Silva Ramos.
- Gordini's team manager Jean Lucas took the wheel in the Italian Grand Prix, because Robert Manzon was unavailable.

== Calendar ==
Round	Grand Prix	Circuit	Date
1	Argentine Grand Prix	(Argentina) Autódromo Oscar Alfredo Gálvez, Buenos Aires	16 January
2	Monaco Grand Prix	Circuit de Monaco, Monte Carlo	22 May
3	Indianapolis 500	(United States) Indianapolis Motor Speedway, Speedway	30 May (Note: The Indianapolis 500 also counted towards the 1955 AAA Championship Car season, and was run for AAA Championship cars, but was not run to Formula One regulations.)
4	Belgian Grand Prix	(Belgium) Circuit de Spa-Francorchamps, Stavelot	5 June
5	Dutch Grand Prix	(Netherlands) Circuit Zandvoort, Zandvoort	19 June
6	British Grand Prix	(United Kingdom) Aintree Motor Racing Circuit, Merseyside	16 July
7	Italian Grand Prix	(Italy) Autodromo Nazionale di Monza, Monza	11 September

=== Calendar changes ===
- The Monaco and Dutch Grand Prix returned to the calendar after they had been run for the last time in 1952 and 1953, respectively.
- The British Grand Prix was moved from Silverstone to Aintree, in keeping with the event-sharing arrangement between the two circuits.

==== Cancelled rounds ====
In the aftermath of the 11 June 1955 Le Mans disaster, the 19 June 1955 Dutch GP took place, but the French Grand Prix was postponed from 3 July to 25 September and later cancelled altogether, along with the German, Swiss and Spanish rounds.

Grand Prix	Circuit	Original date
(France) French Grand Prix	Reims-Gueux, Gueux	3 July (25 September)
(West Germany) German Grand Prix	Nürburgring, Nürburg	31 July
(Switzerland) Swiss Grand Prix	Circuit Bremgarten, Bern	21 August
(Spain) Spanish Grand Prix	Pedralbes Circuit, Barcelona	23 October

The circuits at Pedralbes and Bremgarten were never used again for racing. Motor racing head to head on circuits was banned altogether in Switzerland until the 2018 Zürich ePrix.

== Championship report ==
=== Rounds 1 to 3 ===
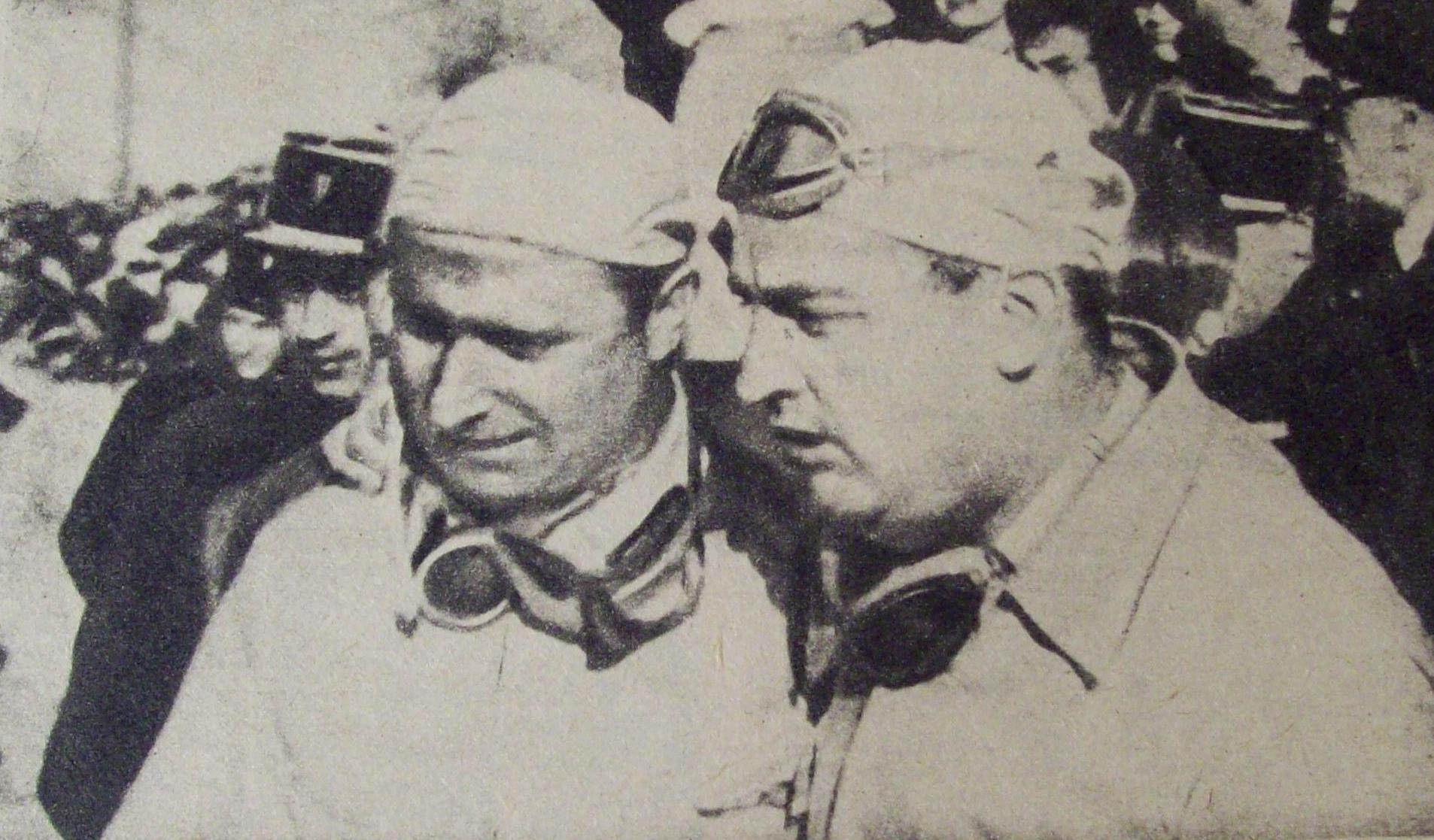
Juan Manuel Fangio (left) and José Froilan González (right)

For the third year in a row, the championship opened early with the 16 January 1955 Argentine Grand Prix, followed a week later with the 1955 1000 km Buenos Aires opening the sports cars WC season. The Ferrari factory entries got disqualified, but a private Ferrari won anyway. The speed weeks ended with the 1955 Buenos Aires Grand Prix Formula Libre two-heat sprint race in which most drivers used their regular F1 cars. Mercedes took the opportunity to test the enlarged pump gas 3.0 version of the F1 engine intended for sports car racing in the upcoming 300 SLR, with Fangio winning a second race for Mercedes.

The Grand Prix was held in very hot weather of the Argentine summer. José Froilan González started on pole position. The Argentine had been a full-time Ferrari driver in 1954, but it would be his only race this year. Next to him on the front row started two double World Champions: Alberto Ascari in the Lancia and Juan Manuel Fangio in the Mercedes. Fangio took the lead at the start, but lost it to Ascari on lap 3. Teammate Stirling Moss went from eighth to third, while behind them, drivers and cars were beginning to succumb to the heat of 52 °C (126 °F). On lap 21, Ascari crashed out by himself, leaving González in the lead. However, he was still recovering from his accident in the 1954 RAC Tourist Trophy and got exhausted. Fearing he could not hold Fangio behind, he pitted to hand the car to teammate and 1950 World Champion Nino Farina. Fangio pitted as well, for new tyres and to cool off, while Moss retired due to a vapor lock in the fuel pump. This left another local driver, Roberto Mieres in the Maserati, in the lead after starting sixteenth. Sadly, his fuel pump faltered as well and he spent 10 minutes in the pits, coming home in fifth. Besides Mieres, Fangio would be the only classified driver not to have switched cars during the race, and went on to win. Two Ferraris completed the podium, but each had seen three different drivers behind the wheel, so Fangio had an immediate lead in the championship.

With the F1 season having a four month break, teams and drivers focussed on testing or sportscar racing in Sebring or at the Mille Miglia.

The 22 May 1955 Monaco Grand Prix returned to the F1 calendar, after the 1950 pile-up race. The 1952 edition had been run with sportscars rather than F2. The 1955 GP was given the honorary title of European Grand Prix. A new rule to qualifying had been added: only the times recorded in the first practice session on Thursday afternoon would count for the front row of the grid and, thus, for pole position. The rest of the starting places would be decided by the remaining sessions on Friday and Saturday morning. This was done to entice spectators to come and watch every session, but it was an unpopular idea with the drivers. Fangio set the fastest time, ahead of Ascari and Moss, so they could relax and use the remaining sessions to try out car set-ups for the race. At the start of the race, Fangio held on to the lead, but Ascari fell back. Moss took second place after a few laps and was slowly closing up to his teammate in front. After the two drivers behind Moss pitted, Ascari was left in a lonely third place until, at half-distance, Fangio stopped on track with a broken transmission and, on lap 81, Moss's engine blew up. Ascari took the unexpected lead of the race, but mere seconds later, crashed coming out of the harbour chicane and plunged into the water. He was lucky to escape with just a cut on the nose. Maurice Trintignant took the win for Ferrari, the first of his career, ahead of Eugenio Castellotti for Lancia and Cesare Perdisa in Jean Behra's Maserati.

The Indianapolis 500 was included in the Formula One championship, but no F1 drivers attended. Bob Sweikert won the race.

In the Drivers' Championship, Maurice Trintignant (Ferrari) was leading with 11$\tfrac{1}{3}$ points, ahead of Juan Manuel Fangio (Mercedes) with 10 and Bob Sweikert (Kurtis Kraft) with 8. Sweikert would not compete in any other rounds.

=== Rounds 4 to 6 ===
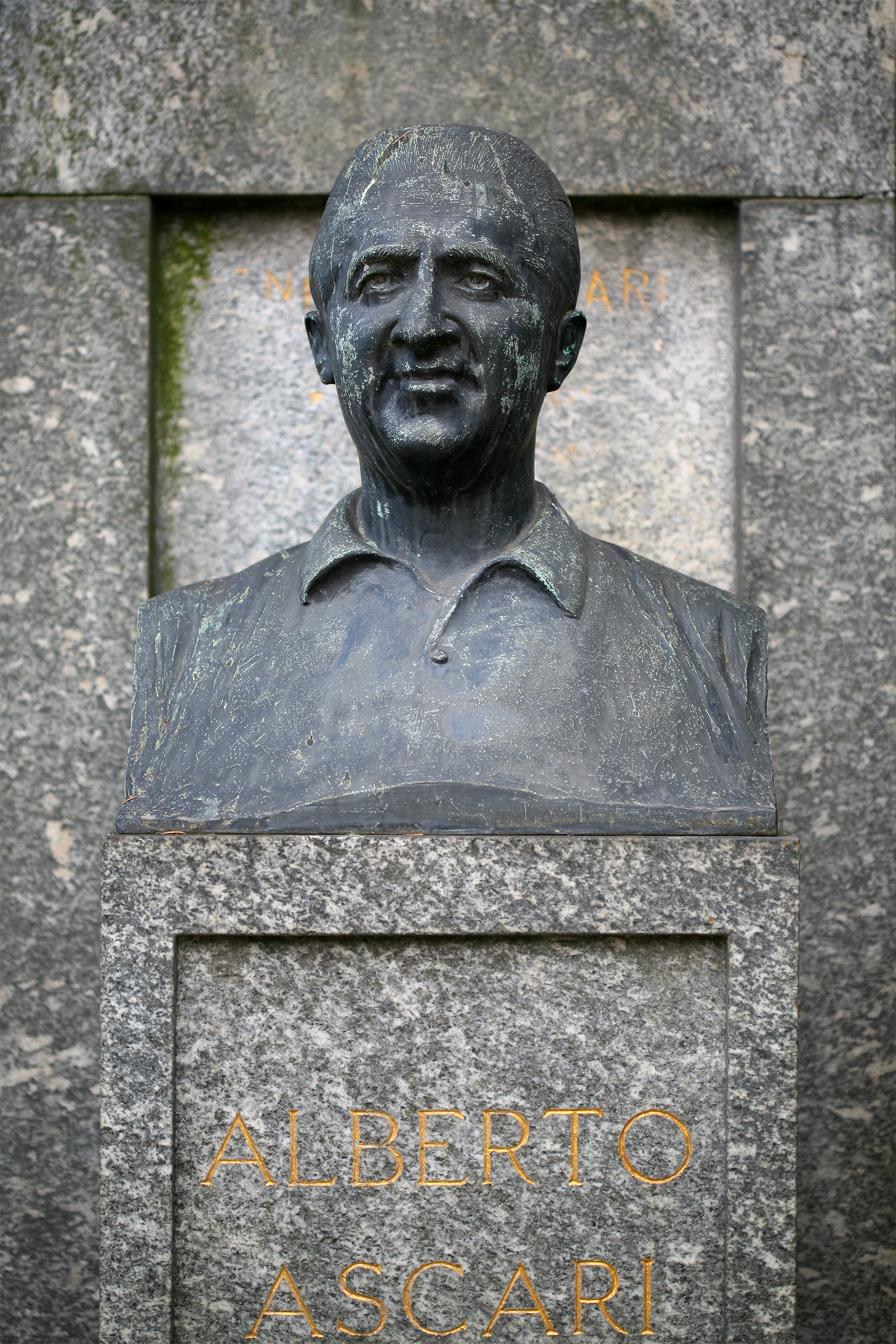
A statue in Milan to honour the memory of Alberto Ascari.

Four days after the Monaco Grand Prix, double World Champion Alberto Ascari was tragically killed in a test session at Monza. Further burdened by financial troubles, the Lancia team was left with two cars and just one driver. Soon, all assets would be merged into the Ferrari team, but this did not stop Eugenio Castellotti from scoring his first career pole position in the Belgian Grand Prix. The Mercedes cars of Juan Manuel Fangio and Stirling Moss started beside him on the front row. Championship leader Maurice Trintignant started down in eleventh out of thirteen. At the start, Fangio and Moss quickly took the lead and never looked back. Castellotti retired on lap 16, allowing 1950 World Champion Nino Farina to finish third for Ferrari.

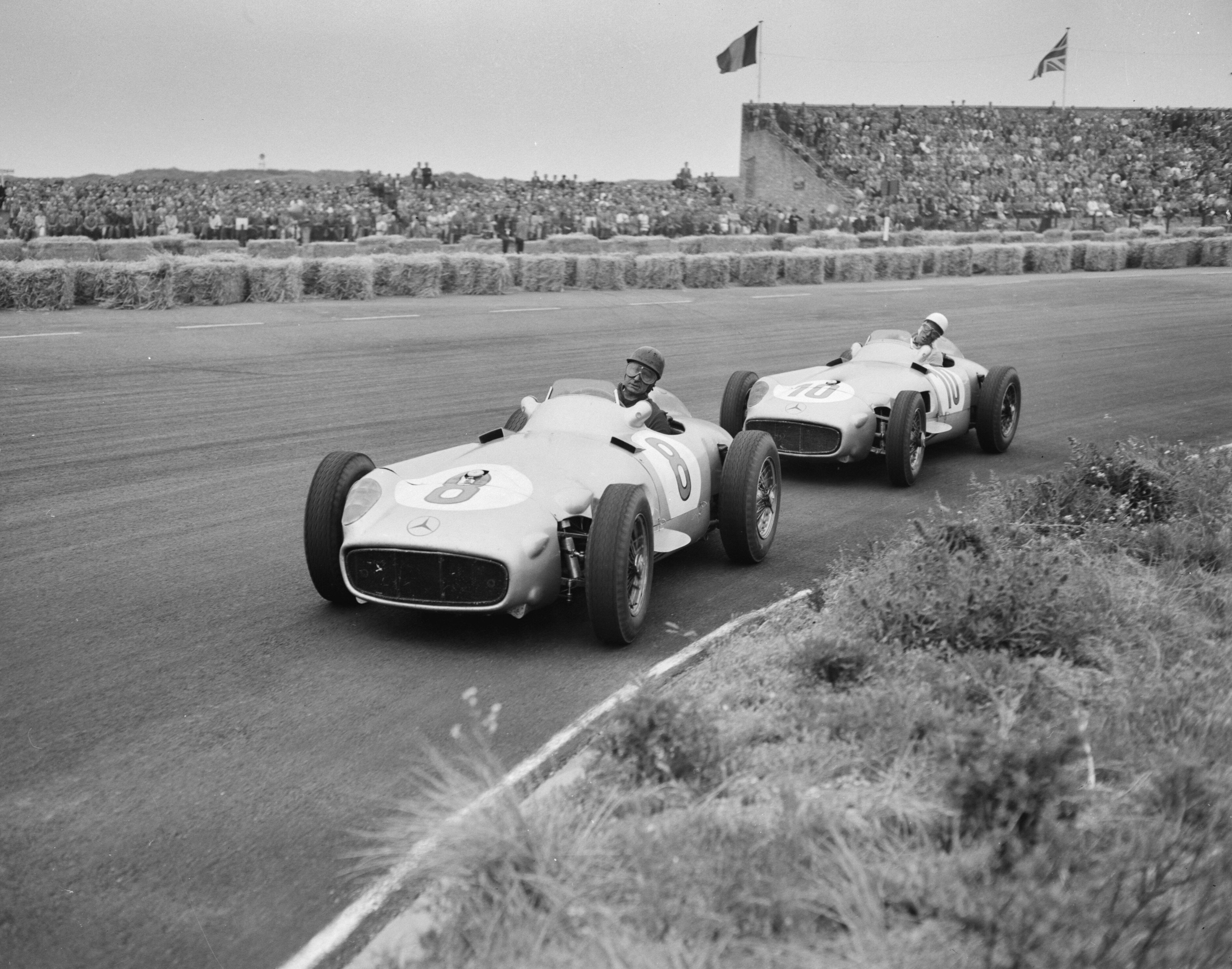
Fangio leading Stirling Moss in the 1955 Dutch Grand Prix

On 11 June, the 24 Hours of Le Mans took place and many F1 drivers participated. During the race, Pierre Levegh crashed into the spectator area, killing 83 people and injuring at least 120 others. This led the FIA to postpone the French Grand Prix. However, the Dutch Grand Prix was next on the F1 championship and went on undisturbed. Mercedes managed to occupy the front row with Fangio, Moss and Karl Kling. At the start, Luigi Musso put his Maserati into second position, but was outbraved by Moss. Kling tried his best to keep up with the leading trio but, on lap 21, spun off and retired. Fangio and Moss scored another one-two finish, a minute ahead of Musso. This was the first race since the 1950 French Grand Prix that none of the cars on the podium were powered by a Ferrari engine.

For the British Grand Prix, Stirling Moss scored his first career pole position in front of his home crowd. Fangio started second, Jean Behra third for Maserati. The second row was filled by two more Mercedes: Karl Kling and Piero Taruffi. Fangio had the best start, but Moss regained the lead on lap 3, his car set up with a lower top speed but better acceleration out of the corners. Behra retired on lap 10, handing the top four positions to Mercedes, with Fangio once again in front. A couple of laps later, Moss retook the lead, grew his advantage to ten seconds and set a new lap record. Unused to having the team leader behind him, Moss looked back on the last lap and hesitated. But Fangio hang back, two tenths behind, leaving the home hero to take the win.

In the Drivers' Championship, Juan Manuel Fangio (Mercedes) led with 33 points, ahead of Stirling Moss (Mercedes) with 22 and Maurice Trintignant (Ferrari) with 11$\tfrac{1}{3}$ points. After the British Grand Prix, the German, Swiss, French and Spanish Grand Prix were cancelled, in the aftermath of the 1955 Le Mans disaster. This left just one race in the championship and effectively handed the title to Fangio.

=== Round 7 ===
The Italian Grand Prix was run on the 10 km (6.2 mi) Monza layout including a new steep banking. Nino Farina crashed in practice when his rear tyre came apart under the load of the banked turn and the heat of the sun. He escaped unhurt but his Ferrari-run Lancia was written off, and although Sunday was substantially cooler, the other Lancia was withdrawn as a precaution. Like in Zandvoort, Mercedes occupied the front row in the order of Fangio, Moss, Kling. Moss took the lead at the start, but gave way to his Argentinian team leader before the first lap was run. The fourth Mercedes of Taruffi went from ninth to fourth, the team repeating their procession run from last race. However, Moss pitted on lap 19 for a new windscreen and subsequently retired on lap 28 when his engine cut out. Kling's gearbox broke and he retired as well, leaving the German team worried, but Fangio and Taruffi finished the race untroubled, scoring another Mercedes 1–2, ahead of Eugenio Castellotti for Ferrari.

Juan Manuel Fangio (Mercedes) had collected 40 points and won his third Drivers' Championship, his second in a row. Teammate Stirling Moss was second with 23 points and Eugenio Castellotti third with 12. Mercedes withdrew from F1 after this season, marking it the final race until the team's revival in 2010, their final win until the 2012 Chinese Grand Prix and final championship title until 2014.

== Results and standings ==
=== Grands Prix ===
Round	Grand Prix	Pole position	Fastest lap	Winning driver	Winning constructor	Tyre	Report
1	(Argentina) Argentine Grand Prix	(Argentina) José Froilán González	(Argentina) Juan Manuel Fangio	(Argentina) Juan Manuel Fangio	(West Germany) Mercedes	C	Report
2	Monaco Grand Prix	(Argentina) Juan Manuel Fangio	(Argentina) Juan Manuel Fangio	(France) Maurice Trintignant	(Italy) Ferrari	E	Report
3	(United States) Indianapolis 500	(United States) Jerry Hoyt	(United States) Bill Vukovich	(United States) Bob Sweikert	(United States) Kurtis Kraft-Offenhauser	F	Report
4	(Belgium) Belgian Grand Prix	(Italy) Eugenio Castellotti	(Argentina) Juan Manuel Fangio	(Argentina) Juan Manuel Fangio	(West Germany) Mercedes	C	Report
5	(Netherlands) Dutch Grand Prix	(Argentina) Juan Manuel Fangio	(Argentina) Roberto Mieres	(Argentina) Juan Manuel Fangio	(West Germany) Mercedes	C	Report
6	(United Kingdom) British Grand Prix	(United Kingdom) Stirling Moss	(United Kingdom) Stirling Moss	(United Kingdom) Stirling Moss	(West Germany) Mercedes	C	Report
7	(Italy) Italian Grand Prix	(Argentina) Juan Manuel Fangio	(United Kingdom) Stirling Moss	(Argentina) Juan Manuel Fangio	(West Germany) Mercedes	C	Report

=== Scoring system ===
Points were awarded to the top five classified finishers, with an additional point awarded for setting the fastest lap, regardless of finishing position or even classification. Only the best five results counted towards the championship. Shared drives result in shared points for each driver if they finished in a points-scoring position. If more than one driver set the same fastest lap time, the fastest lap point would be divided equally between the drivers. Numbers without parentheses are championship points; numbers in parentheses are total points scored. Points were awarded in the following system:

Position	1st	2nd	3rd	4th	5th	FL
Race	8	6	4	3	2	1

=== World Championship of Drivers standings ===
Pos.	Driver	ARG (Argentina)	MON (Monaco)	500 (United States)	BEL (Belgium)	NED (Netherlands)	GBR (United Kingdom)	ITA (Italy)	Pts.
1	(Argentina) Juan Manuel Fangio	1^{F}	(Ret^{P}^{F})		1^{F}	1^{P}	2	1^{P}	40 (41)
2	(United Kingdom) Stirling Moss	4† / Ret	9		2	2	1^{P}^{F}	Ret^{F}	23
3	(Italy) Eugenio Castellotti	Ret†	2		Ret^{P}	5	6† / Ret	3	12
4	(France) Maurice Trintignant	2† / 3† / Ret	1		6	Ret	Ret	8	11 1/3
5	(Italy) Nino Farina	2† / 3†	4		3			DNS	10 1/3
6	(Italy) Piero Taruffi		8†		DNS		4	2	9
7	(United States) Bob Sweikert			1					8
8	(Argentina) Roberto Mieres	5	Ret		5†	4^{F}	Ret	7	7
9	(France) Jean Behra	6† / Ret† / Ret	3† / Ret†		5† / Ret	6	Ret	4	6
10	(Italy) Luigi Musso	7† / Ret†	Ret		7	3	5	Ret	6
11	(West Germany) Karl Kling	4† / Ret			Ret	Ret	3	Ret	5
12	(United States) Jimmy Davies			3					4
13	(United States) Tony Bettenhausen			2†					3
14	(United States) Paul Russo			2†					3
15	(Belgium) Paul Frère		8†		4				3
16	(United States) Johnny Thomson			4					3
17	(Argentina) José Froilán González	2†^{P}							2
18	(Italy) Cesare Perdisa		3† / Ret†		8				2
19	(Italy) Luigi Villoresi	Ret† / Ret	5					DNS	2
20	(Argentina) Carlos Menditeguy	Ret† / Ret						5	2
21	(Italy) Umberto Maglioli	3†						6	1 1/3
22	(West Germany) Hans Herrmann	4†	DNQ						1
23	(United States) Walt Faulkner			5†					1
24	(United States) Bill Homeier			5†					1
25	(United States) Bill Vukovich			Ret^{F}					1
—	(United Kingdom) Mike Hawthorn		Ret		Ret	7	6†	10	0
—	(United States) Harry Schell	6† / 7† / Ret†	Ret		DNS		9† / Ret	Ret	0
—	(Monaco) Louis Chiron		6						0
—	(United States) Andy Linden			6					0
—	(France) Jacques Pollet		7			10		Ret	0
—	(United States) Al Herman			7					0
—	(France) Mike Sparken						7		0
—	(Italy) Sergio Mantovani	7† / Ret†							0
—	(Brazil) Hermano da Silva Ramos					8	Ret	Ret	0
—	(United Kingdom) Lance Macklin		DNQ				8		0
—	(United States) Pat O'Connor			8					0
—	(France) Louis Rosier		Ret		9	9			0
—	(United Kingdom) Ken Wharton						9†	Ret	0
—	(United States) Jimmy Daywalt			9					0
—	(United States) John Fitch							9	0
—	(United States) Pat Flaherty			10					0
—	(United States) Duane Carter			11					0
—	(Belgium) Johnny Claes				DNS	11			0
—	(United States) Chuck Weyant			12					0
—	(United States) Eddie Johnson			13					0
—	(United States) Jim Rathmann			14					0
—	(France) Robert Manzon		Ret			Ret	Ret		0
—	(United Kingdom) Horace Gould					Ret	Ret	Ret	0
—	(Italy) Alberto Ascari	Ret	Ret						0
—	(France) Élie Bayol	Ret	Ret						0
—	(France) André Simon		Ret				Ret		0
—	(United Kingdom) Peter Collins						Ret	Ret	0
—	(United Kingdom) Peter Walker					Ret	Ret†		0
—	(Argentina) Jesus Iglesias	Ret							0
—	(Argentina) Pablo Birger	Ret							0
—	(Uruguay) Alberto Uría	Ret							0
—	(United States) Don Freeland			Ret					0
—	(United States) Cal Niday			Ret					0
—	(United States) Art Cross			Ret					0
—	(United States) Shorty Templeman			Ret					0
—	(United States) Sam Hanks			Ret					0
—	(United States) Keith Andrews			Ret					0
—	(United States) Johnnie Parsons			Ret					0
—	(United States) Eddie Russo			Ret					0
—	(United States) Ray Crawford			Ret					0
—	(United States) Jimmy Bryan			Ret					0
—	(United States) Jack McGrath			Ret					0
—	(United States) Al Keller			Ret					0
—	(United States) Johnny Boyd			Ret					0
—	(United States) Ed Elisian			Ret					0
—	(United States) Rodger Ward			Ret					0
—	(United States) Jerry Hoyt			Ret^{P}					0
—	(United States) Jimmy Reece			Ret					0
—	(United States) Fred Agabashian			Ret					0
—	(United Kingdom) Kenneth McAlpine						Ret		0
—	(Australia) Jack Brabham						Ret		0
—	(United Kingdom) Roy Salvadori						Ret		0
—	(United Kingdom) Leslie Marr						Ret		0
—	(France) Jean Lucas							Ret	0
—	(Argentina) Clemar Bucci	Ret†							0
—	(United Kingdom) Tony Rolt						Ret†		0
—	(United Kingdom) Ted Whiteaway		DNQ						0
—	(United Kingdom) Jack Fairman						DNS		0
—	(Italy) Luigi Piotti							DNS	0
Pos.	Driver	ARG (Argentina)	MON (Monaco)	500 (United States)	BEL (Belgium)	NED (Netherlands)	GBR (United Kingdom)	ITA (Italy)	Pts.

Key
Colour	Result
Gold	Winner
Silver	Second place
Bronze	Third place
Green	Other points position
Blue	Other classified position
Blue	Not classified, finished (NC)
Purple	Not classified, retired (Ret)
Red	Did not qualify (DNQ)
Black	Disqualified (DSQ)
White	Did not start (DNS)
White	Race cancelled (C)
Blank	Did not practice (DNP)
Blank	Excluded (EX)
Blank	Did not arrive (DNA)
Blank	Withdrawn (WD)
Blank	Did not enter (empty cell)
Annotation	Meaning
P	Pole position
F	Fastest lap

- † Position shared between multiple drivers of the same car.

== Non-championship races ==
Other Formula One races were also held in 1955, which did not count towards the World Championship.

Race name	Circuit	Date	Winning driver	Constructor	Report
(Italy) VII Gran Premio del Valentino	Valentino Park	27 March	(Italy) Alberto Ascari	(Italy) Lancia	Report
(France) XVI Pau Grand Prix	Pau	11 April	(France) Jean Behra	(Italy) Maserati	Report
(United Kingdom) III Glover Trophy	Goodwood	11 April	(United Kingdom) Roy Salvadori	(Italy) Maserati	Report
(France) IV Grand Prix de Bordeaux	Bordeaux	25 April	(France) Jean Behra	(Italy) Maserati	Report
(United Kingdom) VII BRDC International Trophy	Silverstone	7 May	(United Kingdom) Peter Collins	(Italy) Maserati	Report
(Italy) VIII Gran Premio di Napoli	Posillipo	8 May	(Italy) Alberto Ascari	(Italy) Lancia	Report
(France) XVII Grand Prix d'Albi	Albi (Les Planques)	29 May	(France) André Simon	(Italy) Maserati	Report
(United Kingdom) III Curtis Trophy	Snetterton	29 May	(United Kingdom) Roy Salvadori	(Italy) Maserati	Report
(United Kingdom) III Cornwall MRC Formula 1 Race	Davidstow	30 May	(United Kingdom) Leslie Marr	(United Kingdom) Connaught-Alta	Report
(United Kingdom) III London Trophy	Crystal Palace	30 July	(United Kingdom) Mike Hawthorn	(Italy) Maserati	Report
(United Kingdom) III Daily Record Trophy	Charterhall	6 August	(United Kingdom) Bob Gerard	(Italy) Maserati	Report
(United Kingdom) III RedeX Trophy	Snetterton	13 August	(United States) Harry Schell	(United Kingdom) Vanwall	Report
(United Kingdom) II Daily Telegraph Trophy	Aintree	3 September	(United Kingdom) Roy Salvadori	(Italy) Maserati	Report
(United Kingdom) II International Gold Cup	Oulton Park	24 September	(United Kingdom) Stirling Moss	(Italy) Maserati	Report
(United Kingdom) I Avon Trophy	Castle Combe	1 October	(United States) Harry Schell	(United Kingdom) Vanwall	Report
(Italy) V Gran Premio di Siracusa	Syracuse	23 October	(United Kingdom) Tony Brooks	(United Kingdom) Connaught-Alta	Report
