= Jack McGrath (racing driver) =

American racing driver (1919–1955)

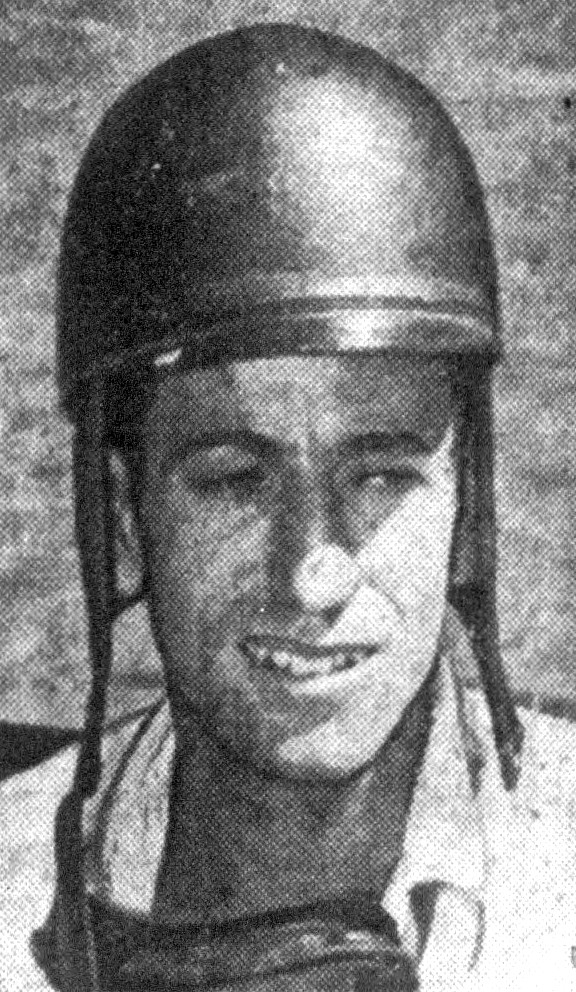
- McGrath, circa 1951
- Born: John James McGrath; October 8, 1919 Los Angeles, California, U.S.
- Died: November 6, 1955 (aged 36) Phoenix, Arizona, U.S.

Awards
- Indianapolis Motor Speedway Hall of Fame (1987)

Champ Car career
- 67 races run over 8 years
- Years active: 1948–1955
- Best finish: 2nd – 1953
- First race: 1948 H. H. Wheler Memorial Cup (Arlington)
- Last race: 1955 Bobby Ball Memorial (Phoenix)
- First win: 1950 Langhorne 100 (Langhorne)
- Last win: 1953 Rex Mays Classic (Milwaukee)
Wins	Podiums	Poles
4	13	9

Formula One World Championship career
- Active years: 1950–1955
- Team: Kurtis Kraft
- Entries: 6
- Championships: 0
- Wins: 0
- Podiums: 2
- Career points: 9
- Pole positions: 1
- Fastest laps: 1
- First entry: 1950 Indianapolis 500
- Last entry: 1955 Indianapolis 500

John James McGrath (October 8, 1919 – November 6, 1955) was an American racecar driver. McGrath died in an accident at Bobby Ball Memorial; he lost control of his car at Turn 3, crashed and flipped, dying instantly.

== Biography ==
McGrath was born in Los Angeles, California, and grew up in South Pasadena, California.

A major player in the "mighty midgets" at Los Angeles's Gilmore Speedway in the late 1940s, McGrath won the first CRA (California Roadster Association) championship in 1946 and was dubbed "King of the Hot Rods". His efforts, along with those of friend and teammate Manuel Ayulo, helped establish track roadsters as viable race cars. The west coast roadsters evolved into sprint cars in the early 1950s.

Major wins at the AAA national level included the 1951 Syracuse and Langhorne 100 mile races, the 1952 Syracuse 100, and the 1953 Milwaukee 200. He finished the 1952 and 1953 AAA championship seasons in second place, and led the first 44 laps of the 1954 Indianapolis 500.

McGrath's storied 26-lap duel with Bill Vukovich in the ill-fated 1955 Indianapolis 500 ended when the magneto on his Hinckle Special Kurtis 500C's Offenhauser (Meyer-Drake) engine failed on lap 54. Fellow Californian and two-time Indy winner Vukovich died three laps later in a chain-reaction crash while in the lead.

The "Splendid Splinter" himself was killed in the final AAA dirt-track race of the 1955 season, the Bobby Ball Memorial at the one-mile dirt oval at the Arizona State Fairgrounds in Phoenix, Arizona.

== Complete AAA Championship Car results ==
Year	1	2	3	4	5	6	7	8	9	10	11	12	13	14	15	Pos	Points
1948	ARL; 9	INDY; 21	MIL	LAN; DNQ	MIL	SPR	MIL	DUQ	ATL	PIK	SPR	DUQ				54th	5.2
1949	ARL	INDY; 26	MIL; 8	TRE; 14	SPR	MIL	DUQ	PIK	SYR	DET	SPR	LAN	SAC	DMR		44th	50
1950	INDY; 14	MIL; 9	LAN; 1	SPR; 14	MIL; DNS	PIK	SYR; 1	DET; 17	SPR; 14	SAC; 14	PHX; 9	BAY; 5	DAR; 9			9th	736.5
1951	INDY; 3	MIL; 18	LAN; 7	DAR; 5	SPR; 2	MIL; 2	DUQ; 16	DUQ; 11	PIK	SYR; 7	DET	DNC; 3	SJS; 4	PHX; 14	BAY; 18	4th	1.460,4
1952	INDY; 11	MIL; 13	RAL; 2	SPR; 2	MIL; 15	DET; 4	DUQ; 5	PIK	SYR; 1	DNC; 6	SJS; 4	PHX; 16				5th	1.200
1953	INDY; 5	MIL; 1	SPR; 4	DET; 16	SPR; 13	MIL; 4	DUQ; 4	PIK	SYR; 9	ISF; DNQ	SAC; 10	PHX; 13				2nd	1.250
1954	INDY; 3	MIL; 4	LAN; DNQ	DAR; 21	SPR; 8	MIL; DNQ	DUQ; 9	PIK	SYR; 10	ISF; 4	SAC; 2	PHX; DNQ	LVG			3rd	1.220
1955	INDY; 26	MIL; 8	LAN	SPR; 10	MIL; 21	DUQ; 2	PIK	SYR; 17	ISF; 15	SAC; 18	PHX; 13					18th	240

== Indy 500 results ==
Year	Car	Start	Qual	Rank	Finish	Laps	Led	Retired
1948	52	13	124.580	16	21	70	0	Stalled
1949	33	3	128.884	8	26	39	0	Oil pump
1950	49	6	131.868	10	14	131	0	Spun T2
1951	9	3	134.303	8	3rd	200	11	Running
1952	4	3	136.664	5	11	200	6	Running
1953	5	3	136.602	13	5	200	0	Running
1954	2	1	141.033	1	3rd	200	47	Running
1955	3	3	142.580	1	26	54	6	Magneto
Totals						1094	70	

Starts	8
Poles	1
Front Row	6
Wins	0
Top 5	3
Top 10	3
Retired	4

- McGrath's starting positions from 1951 to 1955 represent the best 5-year starting position streak in the Roadster Era.
- McGrath was the fastest overall qualifier of the Roadster Era.
- Although McGrath twice posted the fastest qualifying speed, he started from the pole only once when he was the first driver ever to crack the 140-mile-per-hour mark. That was in 1954, with Jimmy Daywalt and 1958 Indy 500 winner Jimmy Bryan to his right. In 1955, he started on the outside of the first row behind pole-day qualifiers Jerry Hoyt and Tony Bettenhausen.

== World Championship career summary ==
The Indianapolis 500 was part of the FIA World Championship from 1950 through 1960. Drivers competing at Indy during those years were credited with World Championship points and participation. McGrath participated in six World Championship races. He started on the pole once, set one fastest lap, and finished on the podium twice. He accumulated a total of nine championship points.

== Sources ==
- Ludvigsen, K.: Indy Cars of the 1950s; Hudson, Wisconsin: Iconografix, 2000.
- Popely, R.; Riggs, L. S.: Indianapolis 500 Chronicles; Lincolnwood, Illinois: Publications International, 1998.
- Scalzo, J.: City of Speed: Los Angeles and the Rise of American Racing; St. Paul, Minnesota: MBI Publishing, 2007.
- Vintage section of the Open Wheel Racers 3 website.
