= Cesare Perdisa =

Italian racing driver (1932–1998)

- Perdisa at the 1955 Monaco Grand Prix
- Born: 21 October 1932; Bologna, Emilia-Romagna, Italy
- Died: 10 May 1998 (aged 65); Bologna, Emilia-Romagna, Italy
- Parent: Luigi Perdisa (father)

Formula One World Championship career
- Nationality: (Italy) Italian
- Active years: 1955–1957
- Team(s): Maserati, Ferrari
- Entries: 8 (7 starts)
- Championships: 0
- Wins: 0
- Podiums: 2
- Career points: 5
- Pole positions: 0
- Fastest laps: 0
- First entry: 1955 Monaco Grand Prix
- Last entry: 1957 Argentine Grand Prix

Cesare Perdisa (21 October 1932 – 10 May 1998) was an Italian racing driver and agricultural journalist, who competed in Formula One at eight Grands Prix from 1955 and 1957.

Born and raised in Bologna, Perdisa was the son of Luigi Perdisa, an agronomist and faculty dean from the University of Bologna, and editor of local agricultural magazine Terra e Vita. (Note: English: Soil and Life) Perdisa participated in eight Formula One Grands Prix, debuting at the 1955 Monaco Grand Prix with Maserati, finishing third alongside Jean Behra. He achieved a further podium with Maserati at the 1956 Belgian Grand Prix alongside Stirling Moss. He competed for Ferrari at the 1957 Argentine Grand Prix, driving a Lancia D50.

Upon retiring from motor racing, Perdisa took over Terra e Vita alongside his brother Sergio, published by Rizzoli until its sale.

== Racing career ==
Perdisa was born on 21 October 1931 in Bologna, Emilia-Romagna, Italy. His father, Luigi Perdisa, was an agronomist from Ravenna and the editor of one of Italy's most popular magazines on agriculture, Terra e Vita; he was also a professor and faculty dean at the University of Bologna, founder of the publishing house Edagricole, and was appointed a Knight of the Order of Merit for Labour in 1976. Perdisa's older brother, Sergio, was to follow his father footsteps and join a publishing house specialized in books on farming but Cesare was more interested in a racing career. His Formula One debut was at the 1955 Monaco Grand Prix where he finished third on a Maserati behind Maurice Trintignant in a Ferrari and Eugenio Castellotti in a Lancia. Castellotti and Perdisa were significantly younger than the majority of the drivers around at the time, and forged a friendship that would last until Castellotti's death in 1957.

During the course of his brief racing career, possibly due to his young age, Perdisa was often asked to give his car to his more experienced teammates when they encountered troubles. This happened, for example, on the 11th lap of the 1956 Belgian Grand Prix, when Stirling Moss lost the right rear wheel of his Maserati. Moss brought his car to a stop and ran a quarter of a mile back to the pits where he took over Perdisa's Maserati, which he drove to the finish.

In January 1957 at the Argentine Grand Prix, Perdisa gave his Ferrari to Wolfgang von Trips first and then to Peter Collins in an attempt to stop Juan-Manuel Fangio's dominance on his Maserati. Despite their best efforts, the trio couldn't keep up with Fangio and finished sixth. In March 1957 Perdisa was set to participate to the 12 Hours of Sebring but he withdrew his entry after he learned of the death of his teammate Eugenio Castellotti at the Modena Autodrome. Castellotti succumbed to his injuries after crashing a Ferrari he was testing for the event. Although Perdisa initially declared his decision to be of a temporary nature, his inability to overcome the shock for the loss of Castellotti eventually brought him to permanently retire from racing.

== Life after racing ==
A few months after his retirement, Perdisa hit the news again in September 1957 when he rushed Juan Manuel Fangio and his partner, Andrea, to a hospital in Bologna. The couple had been thrown from their 2.5 litre Lancia Aurelia while trying to avoid a truck entering the highway. Travelling at close to 100 mph, Fangio's car had smashed into a utility pole, although he and his wife only sustained minor injuries.

Following their father's retirement in the mid-1960s, Perdisa and his brother Sergio continued to edit Terra e Vita. The magazine, initially published by Rizzoli, was eventually purchased by Calderini Agricole, the largest agricultural company in Italy, and switch its focus on farming regulations and technological development.

== Complete Formula One World Championship results ==
(key)

Year	Entrant	Chassis	Engine	1	2	3	4	5	6	7	8	WDC	Points
1955	Officine Alfieri Maserati	Maserati 250F	Maserati Straight-6	ARG	MON; 3 *	500	BEL; 8	NED	GBR	ITA		18th	2
1956	Officine Alfieri Maserati	Maserati 250F	Maserati Straight-6	ARG	MON; 7	500	BEL; 3 †	FRA; 5 †	GBR; 7	GER; DNS	ITA	16th	3
1957	Scuderia Ferrari	Lancia D50	Ferrari V8	ARG; 6 ‡	MON	500	FRA	GBR	GER	PES	ITA	NC	0

* Indicates shared drive with Jean Behra
† Indicates shared drive with Stirling Moss
‡ Indicates shared drive with Peter Collins and Wolfgang von Trips
