= 1957 Argentine Grand Prix =

← Previous race	Next race →

Race details
- Date: 13 January 1957
- Official name: V Gran Premio de la Republica Argentina
- Location: Autódromo Municipal Ciudad de Buenos Aires, Buenos Aires
- Course: Permanent racing facility
- Course length: 3.912 km (2.431 miles)
- Distance: 100 laps, 391.2 km (243.1 miles)

Pole position
Driver	(United Kingdom) Stirling Moss	Maserati
- Time: 1:42.6

Fastest lap
Driver	(United Kingdom) Stirling Moss	Maserati
- Time: 1:44.7

Podium
First	(Argentina) Juan Manuel Fangio	Maserati
Second	(France) Jean Behra	Maserati
Third	(Argentina) Carlos Menditeguy	Maserati

The 1957 Argentine Grand Prix was a Formula One motor race held on 13 January 1957 at the Buenos Aires circuit. It was race 1 of 8 in the 1957 World Championship of Drivers.

== Race report ==
Juan Manuel Fangio had left Ferrari for Maserati to attempt to win a fifth world championship with the help of their much modified 250Fs. Even without him, Ferrari had one of the strongest driver lineups in history, with Mike Hawthorn moving from BRM to join Peter Collins, Luigi Musso and Eugenio Castellotti.

Since the British teams were not present, Stirling Moss — who had signed for Vanwall — was part of the Maserati line-up with Jean Behra as third driver.

Fangio and Behra raced away into the distance as the rest of the field floundered. Moss's throttle linkage broke on the startline and he lost 10 laps having it fixed. The Ferraris were all suffering terribly with clutch problems, as both Collins and Musso burnt theirs out, while Hawthorn's was slipping badly.

Both Collins and Wolfgang von Trips took over Cesare Perdisa's Ferrari in an attempt to stop the Maseratis, but were powerless to stop them taking the first four places. Moss rejoined and set fastest lap on his way to 8th place.

== Classification ==
=== Qualifying ===
Pos	No	Driver	Constructor	Time	Gap
1	4	(United Kingdom) Stirling Moss	Maserati	1:42.6	—
2	2	(Argentina) Juan Manuel Fangio	Maserati	1:43.7	+1.1
3	6	(France) Jean Behra	Maserati	1:44.0	+1.4
4	14	(Italy) Eugenio Castellotti	Ferrari	1:44.2	+1.6
5	10	(United Kingdom) Peter Collins	Ferrari	1:44.6	+2.0
6	12	(Italy) Luigi Musso	Ferrari	1:44.8	+2.2
7	16	(United Kingdom) Mike Hawthorn	Ferrari	1:44.8	+2.2
8	8	(Argentina) Carlos Menditeguy	Maserati	1:45.1	+2.5
9	22	(United States) Harry Schell	Maserati	1:46.4	+3.8
10	20	(Argentina) José Froilán González	Ferrari	1:46.8	+4.2
11	18	(Italy) Cesare Perdisa	Ferrari	1:48.6	+6.0
12	26	(Argentina) Alejandro de Tomaso	Ferrari	1:56.1	+13.5
13	24	(Sweden) Jo Bonnier	Maserati	1:58.2	+15.6
14	28	(Italy) Luigi Piotti	Maserati	1:58.2	+15.6

=== Race ===
Pos	No	Driver	Constructor	Laps	Time/Retired	Grid	Points
1	2	(Argentina) Juan Manuel Fangio	Maserati	100	3:00:55.9	2	8
2	6	(France) Jean Behra	Maserati	100	+18.3 secs	3	6
3	8	(Argentina) Carlos Menditeguy	Maserati	99	+1 Lap	8	4
4	22	(United States) Harry Schell	Maserati	98	+2 Laps	9	3
5	20	(Spain) Alfonso de Portago (Argentina) José Froilán González	Ferrari	98	+2 Laps	10	1; 1
6	18	(Italy) Cesare Perdisa (United Kingdom) Peter Collins (Germany) Wolfgang von Trips	Ferrari	98	+2 Laps	11	
7	24	(Sweden) Jo Bonnier	Maserati	95	+5 Laps	13	
8	4	(United Kingdom) Stirling Moss	Maserati	93	+7 Laps	1	1^{1}
9	26	(Argentina) Alejandro de Tomaso	Ferrari	91	+9 Laps	12	
10	28	(Italy) Luigi Piotti	Maserati	90	+10 Laps	14	
Ret	14	(Italy) Eugenio Castellotti	Ferrari	75	Wheel	4	
Ret	16	(United Kingdom) Mike Hawthorn	Ferrari	35	Clutch	7	
Ret	12	(Italy) Luigi Musso	Ferrari	31	Clutch	6	
Ret	10	(United Kingdom) Peter Collins	Ferrari	26	Clutch	5	

Notes

- ^1 – 1 point for fastest lap

== Notes ==
- This was the Formula One World Championship debut for Argentinian driver Alejandro de Tomaso.

== Shared drives ==
- Car #20: Alfonso de Portago (49 laps) and José Froilán González (49 laps). They shared the 2 points for fifth place.
- Car #18: Cesare Perdisa (30 laps), Peter Collins (35 laps) and Wolfgang von Trips (33 laps).

== Championship standings after the race ==
Drivers' Championship standings

Pos	Driver	Points
1	(Argentina) Juan Manuel Fangio	8
2	(France) Jean Behra	6
3	(Argentina) Carlos Menditeguy	4
4	(United States) Harry Schell	3
5=	(Spain) Alfonso de Portago	1
5=	(Argentina) José Froilán González	1
5=	(United Kingdom) Stirling Moss	1

- Note: Only the top five positions are included.

Previous race: 1956 Italian Grand Prix	FIA Formula One World Championship; 1957 season	Next race: 1957 Monaco Grand Prix
Previous race: 1956 Argentine Grand Prix	Argentine Grand Prix	Next race: 1958 Argentine Grand Prix
