= 1955 Belgian Grand Prix =

← Previous race	Next race →
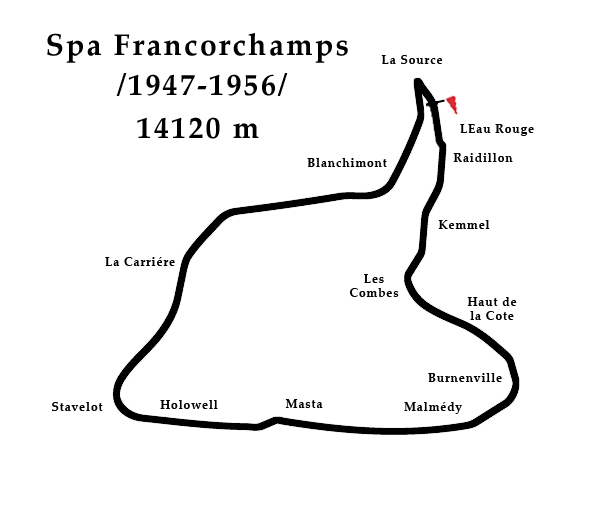
- Spa-Francorchamps layout

Race details
- Date: June 5, 1955
- Official name: XVII Grand Prix de Belgique
- Location: Circuit de Spa-Francorchamps
- Course: Permanent racing facility
- Course length: 14.120 km (8.774 miles)
- Distance: 36 laps, 508.320 km (315.855 miles)

Pole position
Driver	(Italy) Eugenio Castellotti	Lancia
- Time: 4:18.1

Fastest lap
Driver	(Argentina) Juan Manuel Fangio	Mercedes
- Time: 4:20.6

Podium
First	(Argentina) Juan Manuel Fangio	Mercedes
Second	(United Kingdom) Stirling Moss	Mercedes
Third	(Italy) Nino Farina	Ferrari

The 1955 Belgian Grand Prix was a Formula One motor race held at Spa-Francorchamps on June 5, 1955. It was race 4 of 7 in the 1955 World Championship of Drivers. The 36-lap race was won by Mercedes driver Juan Manuel Fangio after he started from second position. His teammate Stirling Moss finished second and Ferrari driver Nino Farina came in third.

== Race report ==
Mercedes returned empty-handed from the 1955 Monaco Grand Prix despite entering three cars and a fourth driver after Hans Herrmann suffered season-ending injury. The promising Lancia D50 was as fast as the silver cars in the hands of Alberto Ascari, but he slipped on oil from Moss's W196 and crashed into the harbour. Even worse, Ascari died a few days later when testing a Ferrari sportscar in Monza, and Lancia stopped its F1 effort. The cars were later given to Ferrari, only the car of Eugenio Castellotti arrived as a private entry in Belgium.

Harry Schell set a grid time but his car was driven by teammate Maurice Trintignant. Castellotti secured pole position with the Lancia D50, becoming the youngest driver to do so (at age 24 years, seven months and 26 days), a record that stood for 13 years until Jacky Ickx's pole position at the 1968 German Grand Prix.

The 1955 Belgian GP was the easiest of 1-2 wins for Mercedes. With the absence of Lancia as a factory team, there was very little competition. Fangio disappeared into the distance with Moss tracking him round while Kling in the third Mercedes suffered an oil leak. Private entrant Eugenio Castellotti retired after 16 laps, Jean Behra crashed and Hawthorn's Vanwall also had an oil leak.

The domination of the silver cars was such that they came in over 2 minutes ahead of Farina in third place after he had lost a great deal of time attempting unsuccessfully to pass Castellotti.

== Entries ==
Team	No	Driver	Car	Engine	Tyre
(Italy) Scuderia Ferrari	2	(Italy) Nino Farina	Ferrari 555	Ferrari 555 2.5 L4	E
(Italy) Scuderia Ferrari	4	(France) Maurice Trintignant	Ferrari 555	Ferrari 555 2.5 L4	E
(Italy) Scuderia Ferrari	4	(United States) Harry Schell	Ferrari 555	Ferrari 555 2.5 L4	E
(Italy) Scuderia Ferrari	6	(Belgium) Paul Frère	Ferrari 555	Ferrari 555 2.5 L4	E
(Italy) Scuderia Ferrari	8	(Italy) Piero Taruffi	Ferrari 555	Ferrari 555 2.5 L4	E
(Germany) Daimler Benz AG	10	(Argentina) Juan Manuel Fangio	Mercedes-Benz W196	Mercedes M196 2.5 L8	C
(Germany) Daimler Benz AG	12	(Germany) Karl Kling	Mercedes-Benz W196	Mercedes M196 2.5 L8	C
(Germany) Daimler Benz AG	14	(United Kingdom) Stirling Moss	Mercedes-Benz W196	Mercedes M196 2.5 L8	C
(Italy) Officine Alfieri Maserati	22	(Italy) Luigi Musso	Maserati 250F	Maserati 250F1 2.5 L6	P
(Italy) Officine Alfieri Maserati	24	(France) Jean Behra	Maserati 250F	Maserati 250F1 2.5 L6	P
(Italy) Officine Alfieri Maserati	24	(Argentina) Roberto Mieres	Maserati 250F	Maserati 250F1 2.5 L6	P
(Italy) Officine Alfieri Maserati	26	(Italy) Cesare Perdisa	Maserati 250F	Maserati 250F1 2.5 L6	P
(France) Ecurie Rosier	28	(France) Louis Rosier	Maserati 250F	Maserati 250F1 2.5 L6	P
(Italy) Scuderia Lancia	30	(Italy) Eugenio Castellotti	Lancia D50	Lancia DS50 2.5 V8	P
(United Kingdom) Stirling Moss Ltd	38	(Belgium) Johnny Claes	Maserati 250F	Maserati 250F1 2.5 L6	D
(United Kingdom) Vandervell Products	40	(United Kingdom) Mike Hawthorn	Vanwall VW 55	Vanwall 254 2.5 L4	P

== Classification ==
=== Qualifying ===
Pos	No	Driver	Constructor	Time	Gap
1	30	(Italy) Eugenio Castellotti	Lancia	4:18.1	—
2	10	(Argentina) Juan Manuel Fangio	Mercedes	4:18.6	+0.5
3	14	(United Kingdom) Stirling Moss	Mercedes	4:19.2	+1.1
4	2	(Italy) Nino Farina	Ferrari	4:20.9	+2.8
5	24	(France) Jean Behra	Maserati	4:23.6	+5.5
6	12	(Germany) Karl Kling	Mercedes	4:24.0	+5.9
7	22	(Italy) Luigi Musso	Maserati	4:26.4	+8.3
8	6	(Belgium) Paul Frère	Ferrari	4:29.7	+11.6
9	4	(United States) Harry Schell	Ferrari	4:31.0	+12.9
10	40	(United Kingdom) Mike Hawthorn	Vanwall	4:33.0	+14.9
11	4	(France) Maurice Trintignant	Ferrari	4:33.2	+15.1
12	26	(Italy) Cesare Perdisa	Maserati	4:50.9	+32.8
13	28	(France) Louis Rosier	Maserati	4:55.4	+37.3
14	24	(Argentina) Roberto Mieres	Maserati	5:09.0	+50.9
DNS	8	(Italy) Piero Taruffi	Ferrari	No time	
DNS	38	(Belgium) Johnny Claes	Maserati	No time	

=== Race ===
Pos	No	Driver	Constructor	Laps	Time/Retired	Grid	Points
1	10	(Argentina) Juan Manuel Fangio	Mercedes	36	2:39:29.0	2	9^{1}
2	14	(United Kingdom) Stirling Moss	Mercedes	36	+8.1	3	6
3	2	(Italy) Nino Farina	Ferrari	36	+1:40.5	4	4
4	6	(Belgium) Paul Frère	Ferrari	36	+3:25.5	8	3
5	24	(Argentina) Roberto Mieres (France) Jean Behra	Maserati	35	+1 Lap	13	1; 1
6	4	(France) Maurice Trintignant	Ferrari	35	+1 Lap	10	
7	22	(Italy) Luigi Musso	Maserati	34	+2 Laps	7	
8	26	(Italy) Cesare Perdisa	Maserati	33	+3 Laps	11	
9	28	(France) Louis Rosier	Maserati	33	+3 Laps	12	
Ret	12	(Germany) Karl Kling	Mercedes	21	Oil Leak	6	
Ret	30	(Italy) Eugenio Castellotti	Lancia	16	Gearbox	1	
Ret	40	(United Kingdom) Mike Hawthorn	Vanwall	8	Gearbox	9	
Ret	20	(France) Jean Behra	Maserati	3	Spun Off	5	
DNS	38	(Belgium) Johnny Claes	Maserati		Engine		
DNS	48	(Italy) Piero Taruffi	Ferrari				
DNS	4	(United States) Harry Schell	Ferrari				

Notes

- ^1 – Includes 1 point for fastest lap

== Shared drive ==
- Car #24: Roberto Mieres (10 laps) and Jean Behra (25 laps). They shared the 2 points for fifth place.

== Championship standings after the race ==
Drivers' Championship standings

	Pos	Driver	Points
1	1	(Argentina) Juan Manuel Fangio	19
1	2	(France) Maurice Trintignant	11 1/3
1	3	(Italy) Nino Farina	10 1/3
1	4	(United States) Bob Sweikert	8
11	5	(United Kingdom) Stirling Moss	7

- Note: Only the top five positions are included. Constructors' Championship not introduced until 1958.

Previous race: 1955 Indianapolis 500	FIA Formula One World Championship; 1955 season	Next race: 1955 Dutch Grand Prix
Previous race: 1954 Belgian Grand Prix	Belgian Grand Prix	Next race: 1956 Belgian Grand Prix
