= 1955 Monaco Grand Prix =

Coordinates: 43°44′4.74″N 7°25′16.8″E

← Previous race	Next race →

Race details
- Date: 22 May 1955
- Official name: XIII Grand Prix Automobile de Monaco
- Location: Circuit de Monaco
- Course: Street circuit
- Course length: 3.145 km (1.955 miles)
- Distance: 100 laps, 314.5 km (195.5 miles)

Pole position
Driver	(Argentina) Juan Manuel Fangio	Mercedes
- Time: 1:41.1

Fastest lap
Driver	(Argentina) Juan Manuel Fangio	Mercedes
- Time: 1:42.4

Podium
First	(France) Maurice Trintignant	Ferrari
Second	(Italy) Eugenio Castellotti	Lancia
Third	(France) Jean Behra; (Italy) Cesare Perdisa	Maserati

The 1955 Monaco Grand Prix was a Formula One motor race held at Monaco on 22 May 1955. It was race 2 of 7 in the 1955 World Championship of Drivers and was given an honorary name, Grand Prix d'Europe. The 100-lap race was won by Ferrari driver Maurice Trintignant after he started from ninth position. Eugenio Castellotti finished second for the Lancia team and Maserati drivers Jean Behra and Cesare Perdisa came in third.

== Race report ==
The prestigious race was won from 1935 to 1937 by the Silver Arrows of Mercedes-Benz, but was not held from 1938 to 1954, except for 1948, 1950 and 1952.

The 1955 F1 season had opened in January with the 1955 Argentine Grand Prix that saw no less than four Mercedes-Benz W196 being entered, as the 1954 lineup of Fangio, Karl Kling and Hans Herrmann had been expanded by Stirling Moss who had been signed also to compete in the 1955 World Sportscar Championship for which usually two drivers per car were needed. Earlier in May, at the 1955 Mille Miglia, Mercedes entered a new Mercedes-Benz 300 SLR for each of the four F1 drivers. Moss won this Mille Miglia after driving for over 10 hours, possibly his greatest win, beating Fangio by half an hour. Kling crashed near Rome, broke some ribs, and was absent in Monaco. As Mercedes had hired extra drivers to man three cars at Le Mans, André Simon was at hand when Hans Herrmann crashed near the sea in practice and was out for the season.

Initially, the Silver Arrows of Fangio and Moss dominated, running 1–2 until half distance, trailed by Ascari and Castellotti. At the halfway mark, Fangio retired with transmission trouble, giving the lead to Moss. Almost a lap ahead, a seemingly sure win for Moss was ended on Lap 80 when his Benz's engine blew. The new leader, Ascari, miscalculated the chicane coming out of the tunnel, and his Lancia crashed through the barriers into the harbour. Ascari had to swim to safety. Maurice Trintignant, in a Ferrari 625 thought to be uncompetitive, inherited the lead and scored his first Formula One victory.

This race marked the Grand Prix debut for Cesare Perdisa. It was the only Grand Prix appearance for Ted Whiteaway. This was the last Grand Prix appearance for Alberto Ascari; he was killed four days later testing a Ferrari sports car at Monza.

It was the first win for Maurice Trintignant and Englebert tyres. It was also the first podium and points for Eugenio Castellotti and Cesare Perdisa, and the first win for a French Formula One driver.

== Entries ==
Team	No	Driver	Car	Engine	Tyre
(West Germany) Daimler Benz AG	2	(Argentina) Juan Manuel Fangio	Mercedes-Benz W196	Mercedes M196 2.5 L8	C
(West Germany) Daimler Benz AG	4	(France) André Simon	Mercedes-Benz W196	Mercedes M196 2.5 L8	C
(West Germany) Daimler Benz AG	4	(West Germany) Hans Herrmann	Mercedes-Benz W196	Mercedes M196 2.5 L8	C
(West Germany) Daimler Benz AG	6	(United Kingdom) Stirling Moss	Mercedes-Benz W196	Mercedes M196 2.5 L8	C
(France) Equipe Gordini	8	(France) Robert Manzon	Gordini T16	Gordini 23 2.5 L6	E
(France) Equipe Gordini	10	(France) Jacques Pollet	Gordini T16	Gordini 23 2.5 L6	E
(France) Equipe Gordini	12	(France) Élie Bayol	Gordini T16	Gordini 23 2.5 L6	E
(United Kingdom) Vandervell Products	18	(United Kingdom) Mike Hawthorn	Vanwall VW 55	Vanwall 254 2.5 L4	P
(United Kingdom) Stirling Moss Ltd	22	(United Kingdom) Lance Macklin	Maserati 250F	Maserati 250F1 2.5 L6	D
(United Kingdom) E.N. Whiteaway	24	(United Kingdom) Ted Whiteaway	HWM 53	Alta GP 2.5 L4	D
(Italy) Scuderia Lancia	26	(Italy) Alberto Ascari	Lancia D50	Lancia DS50 2.5 V8	P
(Italy) Scuderia Lancia	28	(Italy) Luigi Villoresi	Lancia D50	Lancia DS50 2.5 V8	P
(Italy) Scuderia Lancia	30	(Italy) Eugenio Castellotti	Lancia D50	Lancia DS50 2.5 V8	P
(Italy) Scuderia Lancia	32	(Monaco) Louis Chiron	Lancia D50	Lancia DS50 2.5 V8	P
(Italy) Officine Alfieri Maserati	34	(France) Jean Behra	Maserati 250F	Maserati 250F1 2.5 L6	P
(Italy) Officine Alfieri Maserati	36	(Argentina) Roberto Mieres	Maserati 250F	Maserati 250F1 2.5 L6	P
(Italy) Officine Alfieri Maserati	38	(Italy) Luigi Musso	Maserati 250F	Maserati 250F1 2.5 L6	P
(Italy) Officine Alfieri Maserati	40	(Italy) Cesare Perdisa	Maserati 250F	Maserati 250F1 2.5 L6	P
(Italy) Scuderia Ferrari	42	(Italy) Nino Farina	Ferrari 625 F1	Ferrari 555 2.5 L4	E
(Italy) Scuderia Ferrari	44	(France) Maurice Trintignant	Ferrari 555	Ferrari 555 2.5 L4	E
(Italy) Scuderia Ferrari	46	(United States) Harry Schell	Ferrari 555	Ferrari 555 2.5 L4	E
(Italy) Scuderia Ferrari	48	(Italy) Piero Taruffi	Ferrari 555	Ferrari 555 2.5 L4	E
(Italy) Scuderia Ferrari	48	(Belgium) Paul Frère	Ferrari 555	Ferrari 555 2.5 L4	E

== Classification ==
=== Qualifying ===
Pos	No	Driver	Constructor	Time	Gap
1	2	(Argentina) Juan Manuel Fangio	Mercedes	1:41.1	
2	26	(Italy) Alberto Ascari	Lancia	1:41.1	+0.0
3	6	(United Kingdom) Stirling Moss	Mercedes	1:41.2	+0.1
4	30	(Italy) Eugenio Castellotti	Lancia	1:42.0	+0.9
5	34	(France) Jean Behra	Maserati	1:42.6	+1.5
6	36	(Argentina) Roberto Mieres	Maserati	1:43.7	+2.6
7	28	(Italy) Luigi Villoresi	Lancia	1:43.7	+2.6
8	38	(Italy) Luigi Musso	Maserati	1:44.3	+3.2
9	44	(France) Maurice Trintignant	Ferrari	1:44.4	+3.3
10	4	(France) André Simon	Mercedes	1:45.5	+4.4
11	40	(Italy) Cesare Perdisa	Maserati	1:45.6	+4.5
12	18	(United Kingdom) Mike Hawthorn	Vanwall	1:45.6	+4.5
13	8	(France) Robert Manzon	Gordini	1:46.0	+4.9
14	42	(Italy) Nino Farina	Ferrari	1:46.0	+4.9
15	48	(Italy) Piero Taruffi	Ferrari	1:46.0	+4.9
16	12	(France) Élie Bayol	Gordini	1:46.5	+5.4
17	14	(France) Louis Rosier	Maserati	1:46.7	+5.6
18	46	(United States) Harry Schell	Ferrari	1:46.8	+5.7
19	32	(Monaco) Louis Chiron	Lancia	1:47.3	+6.2
20	10	(France) Jacques Pollet	Gordini	1:49.4	+8.3
DNQ	22	(United Kingdom) Lance Macklin	Maserati	1:49.4	+8.3
DNQ	24	(United Kingdom) Ted Whiteaway	HWM-Alta	1:57.2	+16.1

=== Race ===
Pos	No	Driver	Constructor	Laps	Time/Retired	Grid	Points
1	44	(France) Maurice Trintignant	Ferrari	100	2:58:09.8	9	8
2	30	(Italy) Eugenio Castellotti	Lancia	100	+ 20.2	4	6
3	34	(France) Jean Behra (Italy) Cesare Perdisa	Maserati	99	+ 1 lap	5	2; 2
4	42	(Italy) Nino Farina	Ferrari	99	+ 1 lap	14	3
5	28	(Italy) Luigi Villoresi	Lancia	99	+ 1 lap	7	2
6	32	(Monaco) Louis Chiron	Lancia	95	+ 5 laps	19	
7	10	(France) Jacques Pollet	Gordini	91	+ 9 laps	20	
8	48	(Italy) Piero Taruffi (Belgium) Paul Frère	Ferrari	86	+ 14 laps	15	
9	6	(United Kingdom) Stirling Moss	Mercedes	81	+ 19 laps	3	
Ret	40	(Italy) Cesare Perdisa (France) Jean Behra	Maserati	86	Spun off	11	
Ret	26	(Italy) Alberto Ascari	Lancia	80	Accident	2	
Ret	46	(United States) Harry Schell	Ferrari	68	Engine	18	
Ret	36	(Argentina) Roberto Mieres	Maserati	64	Transmission	6	
Ret	12	(France) Élie Bayol	Gordini	63	Transmission	16	
Ret	2	(Argentina) Juan Manuel Fangio	Mercedes	49	Transmission	1	1^{1}
Ret	8	(France) Robert Manzon	Gordini	38	Gearbox	13	
Ret	4	(France) André Simon	Mercedes	24	Engine	10	
Ret	18	(United Kingdom) Mike Hawthorn	Vanwall	22	Throttle	12	
Ret	14	(France) Louis Rosier	Maserati	8	Fuel leak	17	
Ret	38	(Italy) Luigi Musso	Maserati	7	Transmission	8	
DNQ	22	(United Kingdom) Lance Macklin	Maserati				
DNQ	24	(United Kingdom) Ted Whiteaway	HWM-Alta				
DNQ	4	(West Germany) Hans Herrmann	Mercedes		Driver injured		

Notes

- ^1 – 1 point for fastest lap

== Shared drives ==
  - Car #34: Jean Behra (42 laps) and Cesare Perdisa (57 laps). They shared the 4 points for third place.
  - Car #48: Piero Taruffi (50 laps) and Paul Frère (36 laps).
  - Car #40: Cesare Perdisa (40 laps) and Jean Behra (46 laps).

== Summary ==
- Formula 1 debut for Cesare Perdisa, who shared third place drive with Jean Behra, and Ted Whiteaway, who failed to qualify
- Juan Manuel Fangio broke the track record that had stood since 1937, when Rudolf Caracciola turned a lap in 1:46.5 in a 5.6-litre Mercedes W125, running the circuit in 1:41.1 on the first day of practice in his Mercedes W196.
- Alberto Ascari matched Fangio's time in his Lancia D50 during the Saturday practice, though the order had been set on the first day of practice in a singular exception to the policy of the time of all practice laps counting towards grid position.
- In practice, Mercedes youngster Hans Herrmann crashed into a harbour wall and suffered injuries that took him out for the rest of the season.
- Ascari was driving the number 26 car, the same number that had been on the P2 Alfa Romeo his father, Antonio Ascari, had been driving when killed in the 26 July 1925 French Grand Prix. The superstitious Ascari was between Mercedes drivers Fangio and Stirling Moss in the numbers 2 and 6 respectively.
- Andre Simon's was the first Mercedes to leave the race, with engine failure. Of the other Mercedes, Fangio left the race with transmission problems on lap 50, leaving Stirling Moss in first and Ascari in second. Lap 80 saw Moss taken out by a minor problem in his car's sophisticated valve train, leaving Ascari in first. Ascari never made it past the pits to see that, however: his Lancia didn't make the chicane (possibly losing traction on oil from Moss's engine failure) and he flipped over the barrier and into the harbour. His Lancia was craned out of 25 feet of water while he spent the night in the hospital.
- Later events indicate that he probably should have kept his superstitions up and taken this as an omen, but his motivation wouldn't quit and four days later he was back in the cockpit at Monza, where he was killed in a bizarre accident testing a Ferrari on the 26th of the month. There are no definite explanations for either of Ascari's accidents, but the Monza incident was, apart from possible undetected brain injuries after the Monaco crash, probably caused by an improperly-sized tire – 7.00x16 rather than 6.50x16 – combined with an imperfect track surface.
- Mercedes also had not seen the last of their troubles – after all three cars left contention with mechanical problems at Monaco, the worst accident in racing history involved a Mercedes.
- Louis Chiron's start made him the oldest driver to start a Grand Prix (55 years, 292 days).

== Championship standings after the race ==
Drivers' Championship standings

	Pos	Driver	Points
1	1	(France) Maurice Trintignant	11 1/3
1	2	(Argentina) Juan Manuel Fangio	10
1	3	(Italy) Nino Farina	6 1/3
10	4	(Italy) Eugenio Castellotti	6
1	5	(Argentina) José Froilán González	2

- Note: Only the top five positions are included.

Previous race: 1955 Argentine Grand Prix	FIA Formula One World Championship; 1955 season	Next race: 1955 Indianapolis 500
Previous race: 1952 Monaco Grand Prix	Monaco Grand Prix	Next race: 1956 Monaco Grand Prix
Previous race: 1954 German Grand Prix	European Grand Prix (Designated European Grand Prix)	Next race: 1956 Italian Grand Prix
