= Ferrari non-championship Formula One results =

The table below details the non-championship Formula One results for Scuderia Ferrari's factory team-entered and privately entered Formula One cars since 1955, with a separate list provided.

== Non-championship Formula One results ==
(key)

Year	Chassis	Engine	Driver	1	2	3	4	5	6	7	8	9	10	11	12	13	14	15	16	17	18	19	20	21
1955	625	555 2.5 L4		NZL	BUE	VAL	PAU	GLO	BOR	INT	NAP	ALB	CUR	COR	LON	DRT	RED	DTT	OUL	AVO	SYR			
1955	625	555 2.5 L4	(United States) Harry Schell			5																		
1955	625	555 2.5 L4	(Spain) Alfonso de Portago			Ret	8		Ret	DNS									Ret					
1955	625	555 2.5 L4	(Italy) Giuseppe Farina			Ret				DNA														
1955	555	555 2.5 L4	(Italy) Giuseppe Farina						Ret/ Ret^{†}															
1955	625	555 2.5 L4	(France) Maurice Trintignant			8				DNA														
1955	555	555 2.5 L4	(France) Maurice Trintignant						Ret^{†}															
1955	Lancia D50	Lancia DS50 2.5 V8	(Italy) Eugenio Castellotti																7					
1955	Lancia D50	Lancia DS50 2.5 V8	(United Kingdom) Mike Hawthorn																2^{P}	DNA				
1956	Lancia D50	Lancia DS50 2.5 V8		BUE	GLV	SYR	AIN	INT	NAP	100	VNW	CAE	SUS	BRH										
1956	Lancia D50	Lancia DS50 2.5 V8	(Argentina) Juan Manuel Fangio	1^{P}^{F}		1^{P}^{F}		Ret																
1956	Lancia D50	Lancia DS50 2.5 V8	(Italy) Eugenio Castellotti	Ret		Ret			Ret^{P}															
1956	Lancia D50	Lancia DS50 2.5 V8	(Italy) Luigi Musso	Ret		2			Ret^{F}															
1956	Lancia D50	Lancia DS50 2.5 V8	(United Kingdom) Peter Collins			3		Ret																
1956	555	555 2.5 L4	(United Kingdom) Peter Collins	5																				
1956	555	555 2.5 L4	(Belgium) Olivier Gendebien	6																				
1957	Lancia D50	Lancia DS50 2.5 V8		BUE	SYR	PAU	GLV	NAP	RMS	CAE	INT	MOD	MOR											
1957	Lancia D50	Lancia DS50 2.5 V8	(United Kingdom) Peter Collins	3^{†}/ 8^{†}^{F}	1^{P}			1	Ret															
1957	Lancia D50	Lancia DS50 2.5 V8	(Italy) Eugenio Castellotti	5^{†}																				
1957	Lancia D50	Lancia DS50 2.5 V8	(Italy) Luigi Musso	3^{†}/ 5^{†}	2				1															
1957	Lancia D50	Lancia DS50 2.5 V8	(Italy) Cesare Perdisa	7																				
1957	Lancia D50	Lancia DS50 2.5 V8	(Germany) Wolfgang von Trips	8^{†}																				
1957	Lancia D50	Lancia DS50 2.5 V8	(United States) Masten Gregory	Ret																				
1957	Lancia D50	Lancia DS50 2.5 V8	(United Kingdom) Mike Hawthorn					2^{P}^{F}	Ret															
1957	Lancia D50	Lancia DS50 2.5 V8	(Belgium) Olivier Gendebien						Ret															
1957	246	143 2.4 V6	(Italy) Luigi Musso					3					2^{F}											
1957	246	143 2.4 V6	(United Kingdom) Peter Collins									4	Ret											
1957	246	143 2.4 V6	(United Kingdom) Mike Hawthorn										Ret											
1958	246	143 2.4 V6		GLV	SYR	AIN	INT	CAE																
1958	246	143 2.4 V6	(United Kingdom) Mike Hawthorn	1^{F}																				
1958	246	143 2.4 V6	(Italy) Luigi Musso		1^{P}^{F}																			
1958	246	143 2.4 V6	(United Kingdom) Peter Collins				1^{F}																	
1959	246	155 2.4 V6		GLV	AIN	INT	OUL	SIL																
1959	246	155 2.4 V6	(France) Jean Behra		1																			
1959	246	155 2.4 V6	(United Kingdom) Tony Brooks		2	Ret																		
1959	246	155 2.4 V6	(United States) Phil Hill			4																		
1960	246	155 2.4 V6		GLV	INT	SIL	LOM	OUL																
1960	246	155 2.4 V6	(United States) Phil Hill		5	4																		
1960	246	155 2.4 V6	(United Kingdom) Cliff Allison		8																			
1960	246	155 2.4 V6	(United States) Richie Ginther			9																		
1961	156	178 1.5 V6		LOM	GLV	PAU	BRX	VIE	AIN	SYR	NAP	LON	SIL	SOL	KAN	DAN	MOD	FLG	OUL	LEW	VAL	RAN	NAT	RSA
1961	156	178 1.5 V6	(Italy) Giancarlo Baghetti							1	1^{F}													
1961	156	178 1.5 V6	(United States) Richie Ginther							WD														
1961	156	178 1.5 V6	(United States) Phil Hill											WD										
1961	156	178 1.5 V6	(Germany) Wolfgang von Trips											WD										
1962	156	178 1.5 V6		CAP	BRX	LOM	LAV	GLV	PAU	AIN	INT	NAP	MAL	CLP	RMS	SOL	KAN	MED	DAN	OUL	MEX	RAN	NAT	
1962	156	178 1.5 V6	(Belgium) Willy Mairesse		1^{F}							1^{F}			DNA									
1962	156	178 1.5 V6	(Mexico) Ricardo Rodríguez						2						DNA									
1962	156	178 1.5 V6	(Italy) Lorenzo Bandini						5			2						1^{P}^{F}						
1962	156	178 1.5 V6	(United States) Phil Hill							3			WD					2^{F}						
1962	156	178 1.5 V6	(Italy) Giancarlo Baghetti							4					DNA									
1962	156	178 1.5 V6	(United Kingdom) Innes Ireland								4													
1963	156	178 1.5 V6		LOM	GLV	PAU	IMO	SYR	AIN	INT	ROM	SOL	KAN	MED	AUT	OUL	RAN							
1963	156	178 1.5 V6	(United Kingdom) John Surtees				DNA	DNA		Ret				1^{P}^{F}			1^{P}^{F}							
1963	156	178 1.5 V6	(Belgium) Willy Mairesse				DNA			Ret														
1963	156	178 1.5 V6	(Italy) Lorenzo Bandini														2							
1964	158	205B 1.5 V8		DMT	NWT	SYR	AIN	INT	SOL	MED	RAN													
1964	158	205B 1.5 V8	(United Kingdom) John Surtees	DNA	DNA	1	DNA		2															
1964	156	178 1.5 V6	(United Kingdom) John Surtees					Ret																
1964	156	178 1.5 V6	(Italy) Lorenzo Bandini	DNA	DNA	2^{P}^{F}		DNA	Ret															
1965	158	205B 1.5 V8		ROC	SYR	SMT	INT	MED	RAN															
1965	158	205B 1.5 V8	(United Kingdom) John Surtees	Ret	2		2^{F}																	
1965	1512	207 1.5 F12	(Italy) Lorenzo Bandini	WD	3		7																	
1966	312/66	218 3.0 V12		RSA	SYR	INT	OUL																	
1966	312/66	218 3.0 V12	(United Kingdom) John Surtees		1^{P}^{F}	2																		
1966	246	228 2.4 V6	(Italy) Lorenzo Bandini		2																			
1967	312/66	242 3.0 V12; 218 3.0 V12		ROC	SPC	INT	SYR	OUL	ESP															
1967	312/66	242 3.0 V12; 218 3.0 V12	(Italy) Lorenzo Bandini	2																				
1967	312/66	242 3.0 V12; 218 3.0 V12	(Italy) Ludovico Scarfiotti	5			1^{F}																	
1967	312/66	242 3.0 V12; 218 3.0 V12	(United Kingdom) Mike Parkes			1	1																	
1967	312/66	242 3.0 V12; 218 3.0 V12	(Italy) Andrea de Adamich						Ret															
1968	312/66	242 3.0 V12; 242C 3.0 V12		ROC	INT	OUL																		
1968	312/66	242 3.0 V12; 242C 3.0 V12	(New Zealand) Chris Amon	4	3^{F}	2																		
1968	312/66	242 3.0 V12; 242C 3.0 V12	(Belgium) Jacky Ickx	8	4	Ret																		
1968	312/66	242 3.0 V12; 242C 3.0 V12	(Italy) Andrea de Adamich	DNS																				
1968	312/66	242 3.0 V12; 242C 3.0 V12	(United Kingdom) Derek Bell			Ret																		
1969	312/66	255C 3.0 V12		ROC	INT	MAD	OUL																	
1969	312/66	255C 3.0 V12	(United Kingdom) Derek Bell		9																			
1969	312/66	255C 3.0 V12	(New Zealand) Chris Amon		10																			
1971	312B	001 3.0 F12		ARG	ROC	QUE	SPR	INT	RIN	OUL	VIC													
1971	312B	001 3.0 F12	(Switzerland) Clay Regazzoni		1				NC															
1971	312B	001 3.0 F12	(United States) Mario Andretti			1			DNA															
1971	312B	001 3.0 F12	(Belgium) Jacky Ickx			11			1^{P}^{F}															
1974	312B3	001/11 3.0 F12		PRE	ROC	INT																		
1974	312B3	001/11 3.0 F12	(Switzerland) Clay Regazzoni		5																			
1974	312B3	001/11 3.0 F12	(Austria) Niki Lauda		2																			
1975	312T	015 3.0 F12		ROC	INT	SUI																		
1975	312T	015 3.0 F12	(Austria) Niki Lauda		1																			
1975	312T	015 3.0 F12	(Switzerland) Clay Regazzoni			1																		
1976	312T2	015 3.0 F12		ROC	INT																			
1976	312T2	015 3.0 F12	(Austria) Niki Lauda	Ret																				
1976	312T2	015 3.0 F12	(Italy) Giancarlo Martini	DNS	10																			
1979	312T3	015 3.0 F12		ROC	DIN																			
1979	312T3	015 3.0 F12	(Canada) Gilles Villeneuve	1																				
1979	312T4	015 3.0 F12	(Canada) Gilles Villeneuve		7																			
1979	312T4	015 3.0 F12	(South Africa) Jody Scheckter		3																			
1980	312T5	015 3.0 F12		ESP																				
1980	312T5	015 3.0 F12	(South Africa) Jody Scheckter	WD																				
1980	312T5	015 3.0 F12	(Canada) Gilles Villeneuve	WD																				
1983	126C2B	021 1.5 V6 t		ROC																				
1983	126C2B	021 1.5 V6 t	(France) René Arnoux	Ret^{F}																				
