= André Wicky =

Swiss racing driver (1928–2016)

- Nationality: (Switzerland) Swiss
- Born: 22 May 1928 Lausanne, Switzerland
- Died: 14 May 2016 (aged 87) Lausanne, Switzerland

André Wicky (22 May 1928 – 14 May 2016) was a Swiss racing driver, active from the late 1950s to the late 1970s. He was mainly involved in sports car racing, as an entrant and team owner as well as a driver, but also took part in several non-championship Formula One races during the 1960s.

== Career ==
Wicky entered the 24 Hours of Le Mans in 1960 and 1961 with an AC Ace, winning the 2.0 GT class in 1960. He returned to Le Mans in 1966, and raced every year until 1975, campaigning Porsches. From 1969, he drove for his own team, the Wicky Racing Team, and his best overall result was 17th in 1971, driving a Porsche 908. The same year, Walter Brun finished seventh in a Wicky Porsche. Occasionally Wicky campaigned other marques besides Porsche; in 1974 he entered a BMW 3.0CSL for Brun, although it retired after one lap, and a De Tomaso Pantera for Max Cohen-Olivar and Philippe Carron, which retired after 16 laps.

From 1961, he participated in occasional Formula One races, first with a Cooper T53, but this car suffered engine failures in every race that Wicky entered. At the 1963 Mediterranean Grand Prix, he drove a Lotus 24 for Scuderia Filipinetti, and achieved his best Formula One result of ninth from 11th on the grid. He subsequently bought the Lotus and entered it in the next two Syracuse Grands Prix, but found little success with the car, only able to repeat his ninth-place finish in the 1965 race, albeit a distant last.

== Racing record ==
=== 24 Hours of Le Mans results ===
Year	Team	Co-Drivers	Car	Class	Laps	Pos.	Class Pos.
1960	(Switzerland) Ecurie Lausannoise	(Switzerland) Georges Gachnang (Switzerland) Jean Gretener	AC Ace-Bristol	GT; 2.0	239	NC	NC
1961	(Switzerland) Ecurie Lausannoise	(Switzerland) Edgar Berney	AC Ace-Bristol	GT; 2.0	115	DNF	DNF
1966	(Italy) Prototip Bizzarrini SRL	(Switzerland) Edgar Berney	Bizzarrini P538-Chevrolet	P +5.0	8	DNF	DNF
1967	(France) Philippe Farjon	(France) Philippe Farjon	Porsche 911S	GT; 2.0	126	DNF	DNF
1968	(France) Jean-Pierre Hanrioud	(France) Jean-Pierre Hanrioud	Porsche 910	P 2.0	248	DNF	DNF
1969	(Switzerland) Wicky Racing Team	(Switzerland) Edgar Berney	Porsche 911T	GT; 2.0	34	DNF	DNF
1970	(Switzerland) Wicky Racing Team	(France) Jean-Pierre Hanrioud	Porsche 907	P 2.5	161	DNF	DNF
1971	(Switzerland) Wicky Racing Team	(Morocco) Max Cohen-Olivar	Porsche 908/02	P 3.0	236	DNF	DNF
1972	(Switzerland) Wicky Racing Team	(Switzerland) Walter Brun (Morocco) Max Cohen-Olivar	Porsche 908/02	S 3.0	-	DNS	DNS
1973	(Switzerland) Wicky Racing Team	(Morocco) Max Cohen-Olivar (Switzerland) Philippe Carron	Porsche 908/02	S 3.0	270	21st	9th
1974	(Switzerland) Wicky Racing Team	(France) Jacques Boucard (France) Louis Cosson	Porsche 908/02	S 3.0	41	DNF	DNF
1975	(Switzerland) Wicky Racing Team	(France) Jose Thibault (France) Elio Cogo	De Tomaso Pantera-Ford	GTS	-	DNQ	DNQ

=== Complete Formula One non-championship results ===
(key)

Year	Entrant	Chassis	Engine	1	2	3	4	5	6	7	8	9	10	11	12	13	14	15	16	17	18	19	20	21
1961	André Wicky	Cooper T51	Climax FPF 1.5 L4	LOM	GLV	PAU; Ret	BRX	VIE	AIN	SYR	NAP; DNA	LON	SIL	SOL	KAN	DAN	MOD	FLG	OUL	LEW	VAL	RAN	NAT	RSA
1963	André Wicky	Cooper T53	Climax FPF 1.5 L4	LOM	GLV	PAU; 7	IMO	SYR; Ret	AIN	INT	ROM; Ret	SOL	KAN											
1963	Ecurie Filipinetti	Lotus 24	BRM P56 1.5 V8											MED; 9	AUT	OUL	RAN							
1964	André Wicky	Lotus 24	BRM P56 1.5 V8	DMT	NWT; DNA	SYR; DNQ	AIN	INT	SOL	MED	RAN													
1965	André Wicky	Lotus 24	BRM P56 1.5 V8	ROC	SYR; 9	SMT	INT	MED	RAN															
1966	André Wicky	Cooper T53	BRM P56 2.0 V8	RSA	SYR; DNS	INT	OUL																	
1967	André Wicky	Cooper T66	Porsche 906 3.0 F6	ROC	SPR	INT	SYR; DNA	OUL	ESP															
