= 1957 Syracuse Grand Prix =

- Non-championship race in the 1957 Formula One season
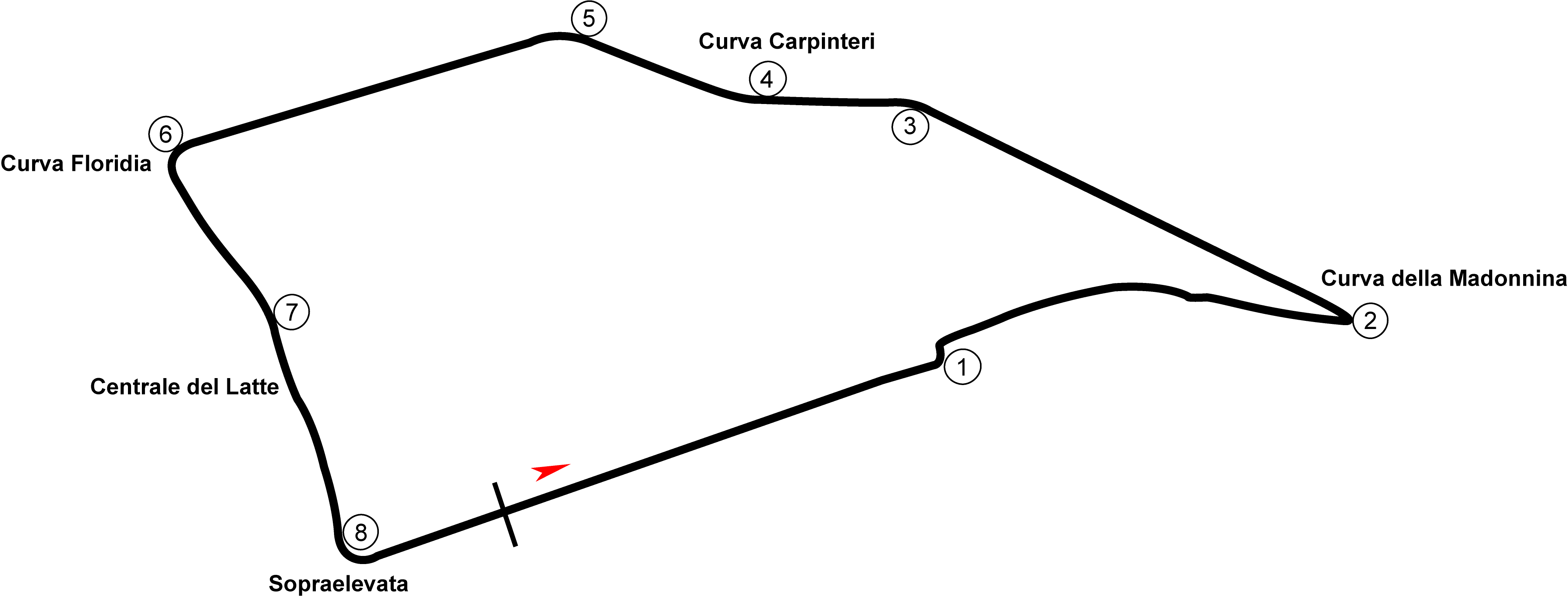

Race details
- Date: 7 April 1957
- Official name: VII Gran Premio di Siracusa
- Location: Syracuse Circuit, Syracuse, Sicily
- Course: Temporary road circuit
- Course length: 5.60 km (3.48 miles)
- Distance: 80 laps, 447.82 km (278.25 miles)

Pole position
Driver	(United Kingdom) Peter Collins	Ferrari
- Time: 1:55.5

Fastest lap
Driver	(United Kingdom) Stirling Moss	Vanwall
- Time: 1:54.3

Podium
First	(United Kingdom) Peter Collins	Ferrari
Second	(Italy) Luigi Musso	Ferrari
Third	(United Kingdom) Stirling Moss	Vanwall

The 7th Syracuse Grand Prix was a motor race, run to Formula One rules, held on 7 April 1957 at Syracuse Circuit, Sicily. The race was run over 80 laps of the circuit, and was won by British driver Peter Collins in a Ferrari 801, who also took pole position. Stirling Moss, driving a Vanwall, set fastest lap.

== Results ==
Pos	No.	Driver	Entrant	Constructor	Time/Retired	Grid
1	32	(United Kingdom) Peter Collins	Scuderia Ferrari	Lancia-Ferrari D50	2h 40m 11.9s, 164.81 km/h	1
2	22	(Italy) Luigi Musso	Scuderia Ferrari	Lancia-Ferrari D50	2h 41m 26.7s (+1m 15.2s)	2
3	20	(United Kingdom) Stirling Moss	Vandervell Products Ltd.	Vanwall	77 laps	3
4	36	(Italy) Piero Taruffi	Scuderia Centro Sud	Maserati 250F	77 laps	7
5	8	(United Kingdom) Ivor Bueb	Connaught Engineering	Connaught Type B-Alta	75 laps	10
6	12	(Australia) Jack Brabham	R.R.C. Walker Racing Team	Cooper T41-Climax	70 laps	14
7	26	(United Kingdom) Bruce Halford	Bruce Halford	Maserati 250F	65 laps - engine	11
8	14	(United Kingdom) Peter Walker	R.R.C. Walker Racing Team	Connaught Type B-Alta	64 laps - spin/stall	17
9	10	(United Kingdom) George Wicken	George Wicken	Cooper T43-Climax	61 laps	16
Ret.	22	(Spain) Francesco Godia-Sales	Francesco Godia-Sales	Maserati 250F	50 laps - engine	8
Ret.	28	(United Kingdom) Bill Whitehouse	Bill Whitehouse	Cooper T41-Climax	38 laps - engine	2
Ret.	34	(Germany) Hans Herrmann	Scuderia Centro Sud	Maserati 250F	66 laps - engine	12
Ret.	130	(United Kingdom) Jack Fairman	Connaught Engineering	Connaught Type B-Alta	35 laps - fuel injection pump	9
Ret.	4	(United Kingdom) Tony Brooks	Vandervell Products	Vanwall	34 laps - water leak	4
Ret	2	(Italy) Luigi Piotti	Luigi Piotti	Maserati 250F	20 laps - gearbox	13
Ret	16	(France) Jean Behra	Officine Alfieri Maserati	Maserati 250F	17 laps - front brake	6
Ret	16	(United States) Harry Schell	Officine Alfieri Maserati	Maserati 250F	1 lap - engine	5
DNS	18	(United Kingdom) Les Leston	Connaught Engineering	Connaught Type B-Alta	Crash	-
DNS	38	(Italy) Giorgio Scarlatti	Officine Alfieri Maserati	Maserati 250F	Engine	-
DNA	34	(United States) Carroll Shelby	Scuderia Centro Sud	Maserati 250F		-
DNA	36	(United States) Masten Gregory	Scuderia Centro Sud	Maserati 250F		-

Previous race: 1957 Buenos Aires Grand Prix	Formula One non-championship races 1957 season	Next race: 1957 Pau Grand Prix
Previous race: 1956 Syracuse Grand Prix	Syracuse Grand Prix	Next race: 1958 Syracuse Grand Prix
