= 1953 Syracuse Grand Prix =

1952 Syracuse Grand Prix
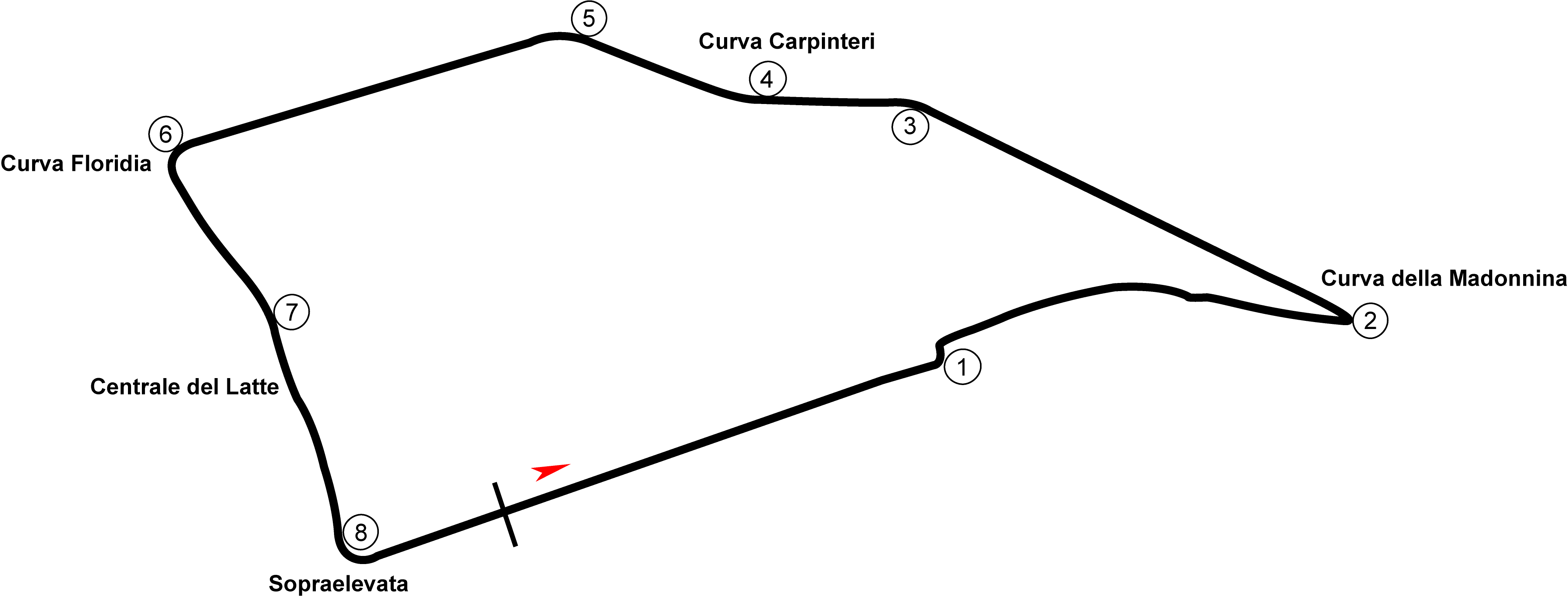

Race details
- Date: 16 March 1952
- Official name: III Gran Premio di Siracusa
- Location: Syracuse Circuit, Syracuse, Sicily
- Course: Temporary road circuit
- Course length: 5.400 km (3.355 miles)
- Distance: 80 laps, 431.979 km (269.440 miles)

Pole position
Driver	(Italy) Alberto Ascari	Ferrari

Fastest lap
Driver	(Italy) Alberto Ascari	Ferrari
- Time: 2:05.0

Podium
First	(Switzerland) Emmanuel de Graffenried	Maserati
Second	(France) Louis Chiron	O.S.C.A.
Third	(United Kingdom) Rodney Nuckey	Cooper T23-Bristol

The 3rd Syracuse Grand Prix was a non-championship Formula Two motor race held in Syracuse, Sicily on 22 March 1953. The race was won by Emmanuel de Graffenried in a Maserati A6GCM. Louis Chiron was second in an O.S.C.A. Tipo 20 and Rodney Nuckey third in a Cooper T23-Bristol. Alberto Ascari started from pole and set fastest lap but retired with mechanical failure, as did every other works Ferrari, in contrast to last year's 1-2-3 walkover.

== Classification ==
=== Race ===
Pos	No	Driver	Entrant	Car	Time/Retired	Grid
1	8	(Switzerland) Emmanuel de Graffenried	Scuderia Enrico Platé	Maserati A6GCM	2:57:31, 148.10kph	4
2	4	(France) Louis Chiron	Louis Chiron	O.S.C.A. Tipo 20	+3 laps	7
3	16	(United Kingdom) Rodney Nuckey	Rodney Nuckey	Cooper T23-Bristol	+6 laps	10
4	14	(United Kingdom) Eric Brandon	Cooper Car Company	Cooper T20-Bristol	+6 laps	9
5	6	(United Kingdom) Peter Whitehead	Peter Whitehead	Cooper T24-Alta	+6 laps	8
NC	30	(Belgium) Charles de Tornaco	Ecurie Francorchamps	Ferrari 500		14
NC	18	(Italy) Giovanni de Riu	Scuderia Enrico Platé	Maserati 4CLT/48		12
NC	22	(Italy) Mario Raffaeli	Scuderia Marzotto	Ferrari 166		13
Ret	2	(Italy) Giuseppe Farina	Scuderia Ferrari	Ferrari 500	61 laps, mechanical	2
Ret	26	(United Kingdom) Mike Hawthorn (Italy) Alberto Ascari	Scuderia Ferrari	Ferrari 500	57 laps, valves	5
Ret	24	(Italy) Alberto Ascari	Scuderia Ferrari	Ferrari 500	37 laps, valves	1
Ret	28	(Italy) Sergio Mantovani	Officine Alfieri Maserati	Maserati A6GCM	36 laps, accident	11
Ret	10	(United States) Tom Cole	Atlantic Stable	Cooper T23-Bristol	36 laps, accident	6
Ret	12	(Italy) Luigi Villoresi	Scuderia Ferrari	Ferrari 500	3 laps, valves	3
DNA	20		Officine Alfieri Maserati	Maserati A6GCM	entry withdrawn	-

Previous race: 1953 Buenos Aires Grand Prix	Formula One non-championship races 1953 season	Next race: 1953 Pau Grand Prix
Previous race: 1952 Syracuse Grand Prix	Syracuse Grand Prix	Next race: 1954 Syracuse Grand Prix
