= 1952 Syracuse Grand Prix =

- Non-championship race in the 1952 Formula One season
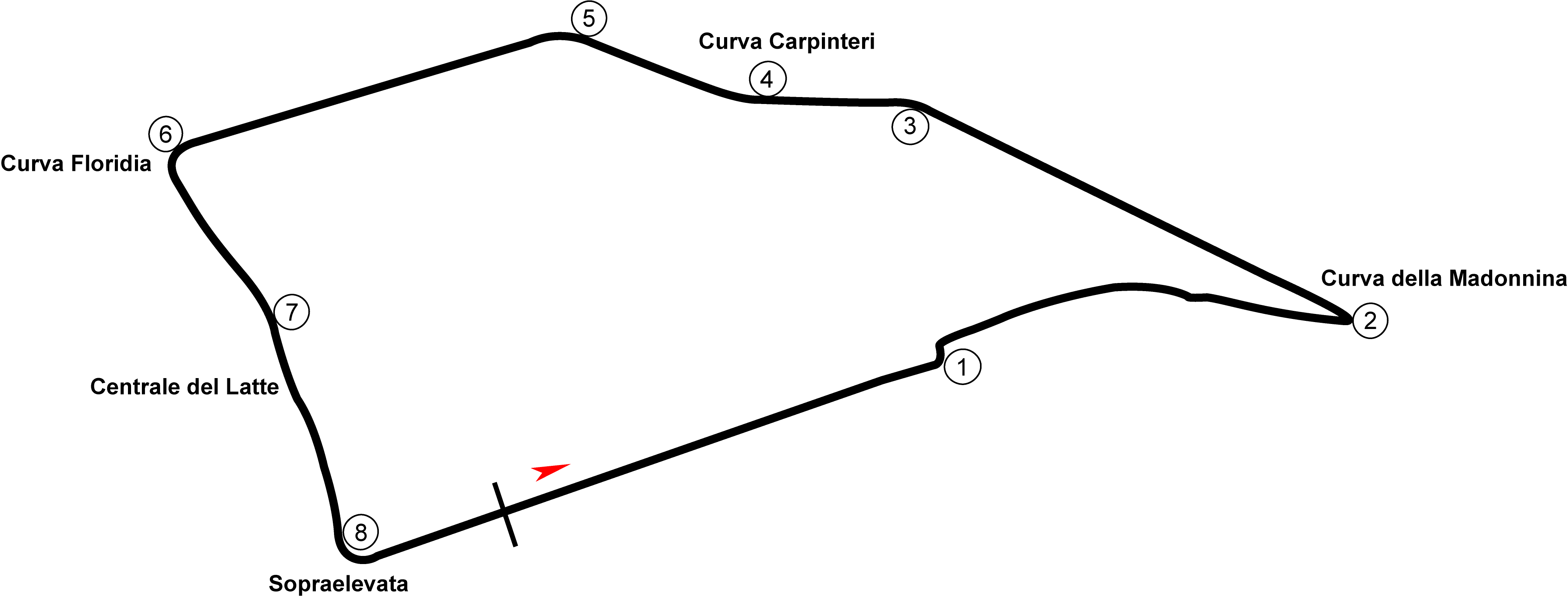

Race details
- Date: 16 March 1952
- Official name: II Gran Premio di Siracusa
- Location: Syracuse Circuit, Syracuse, Sicily
- Course: Temporary road circuit
- Course length: 5.400 km (3.355 miles)
- Distance: 60 laps, 324.016 km (200.130 miles)

Pole position
| Driver | (Italy) Alberto Ascari | Ferrari |
- Time: 2:16.0

Fastest lap
| Driver | (Italy) Luigi Villoresi | Ferrari |
- Time: 2:13.2

Podium
| First | (Italy) Alberto Ascari | Ferrari |
| Second | (Italy) Piero Taruffi | Ferrari |
| Third | (Italy) Giuseppe Farina | Ferrari |

The 2nd Syracuse Grand Prix was a non-championship Formula Two motor race held in Syracuse, Sicily on 16 March 1952. Alberto Ascari, starting from pole, headed teammates Piero Taruffi and Giuseppe Farina in a Scuderia Ferrari 1-2-3. Luigi Villoresi set fastest lap in another works Ferrari.

== Classification ==
=== Race ===
| Pos | No | Driver | Entrant | Car | Time/Retired | Grid |
|---|---|---|---|---|---|---|
| 1 | 24 | (Italy) Alberto Ascari | Scuderia Ferrari | Ferrari 500 | 2:16:24.6, 146.171kph | 1 |
| 2 | 12 | (Italy) Piero Taruffi | Scuderia Ferrari | Ferrari 500 | +58.6s | 4 |
| 3 | 6 | (Italy) Giuseppe Farina | Scuderia Ferrari | Ferrari 500 | +25.8s | 3 |
| 4 | 4 | (Switzerland) Rudi Fischer | Ecurie Espadon | Ferrari 500 | +2 laps | 5 |
| 5 | 8 | (United Kingdom) Peter Whitehead | Peter Whitehead | Ferrari 125 | +2 laps | 8 |
| 6 | 2 | (Italy) Franco Comotti | Scuderia Marzotto | Ferrari 166 | +2 laps | 6 |
| NC | 16 | (Italy) Luigi Villoresi | Scuderia Ferrari | Ferrari 500 | +7 laps | 2 |
| Ret | 32 | (Italy) Vittorio Marzotto | Scuderia Marzotto | Ferrari 166C | 48 laps | 12 |
| Ret | 30 | (Italy) Piero Carini | Scuderia Marzotto | Ferrari 125 | 30 laps | 11 |
| Ret | 28 | (Italy) Maurizio Pinzero | Maurizio Pinzero | Lancia S6 | | 14 |
| Ret | 26 | (Italy) Domenica Tramontana | Domenica Tramontana | Ferrari 125 | | 15 |
| Ret | 20 | (Italy) Sergio Sighinolfi | Scuderia Marzotto | Ferrari 166 | | 7 |
| Ret | 22 | (Switzerland) Emmanuel de Graffenried | Enrico Platé | Maserati 4CLT/48 | | 10 |
| Ret | 10 | (Italy) Franco Cortese | Franco Cortese | Ferrari 166 S | engine | 9 |
| Ret | 18 | (Germany) Hans Stuck | Alex von Falkenhausen Motorenbau | AFM-Küchen | 3 laps, engine | 13 |

| Previous race: 1952 Rio de Janeiro Grand Prix | Formula One non-championship races 1952 season | Next race: 1952 Valentino Grand Prix |
| Previous race: 1951 Syracuse Grand Prix | Syracuse Grand Prix | Next race: 1953 Syracuse Grand Prix |
