= 1964 Syracuse Grand Prix =

- Non-championship race in the 1964 Formula One season
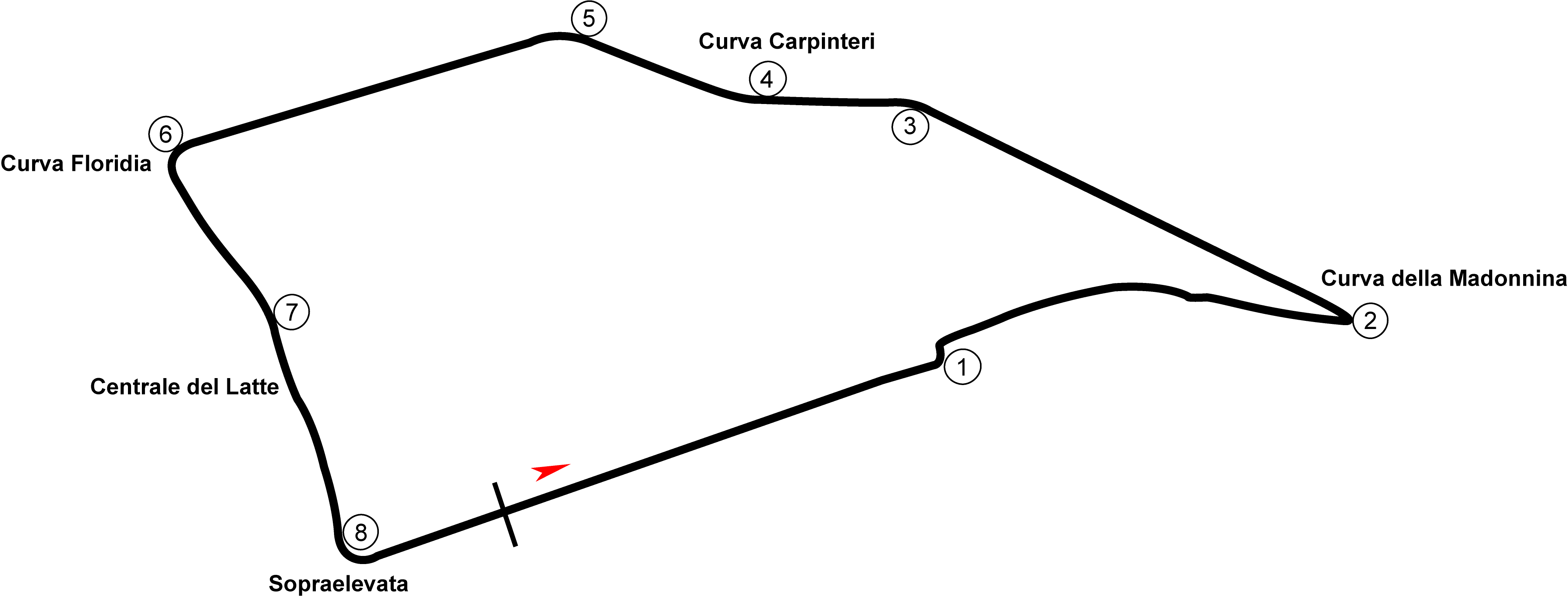

Race details
- Date: 12 April 1964
- Official name: XIII Gran Premio di Siracusa
- Location: Syracuse Circuit, Syracuse, Sicily
- Course: Temporary road circuit
- Course length: 5.612 km (3.487 miles)
- Distance: 56 (reduced to 40) laps, 224.47 km (139.48 miles)
- Weather: Wet

Pole position
Driver	(Italy) Lorenzo Bandini	Ferrari
- Time: 1:50.5

Fastest lap
Driver	(Italy) Lorenzo Bandini	Ferrari
- Time: 1:53.9

Podium
First	(United Kingdom) John Surtees	Ferrari
Second	(Italy) Lorenzo Bandini	Ferrari
Third	(United Kingdom) Mike Spence; (United Kingdom) Peter Arundell	Lotus-Climax

The 13th Syracuse Grand Prix was a motor race, run to Formula One rules, held on 12 April 1964 at Syracuse Circuit, Sicily. The race was run over 40 laps of the circuit, reduced from the original race distance of 56 laps due to bad weather, after lobbying from Jo Bonnier on behalf of the GPDA. The race was won easily by British driver John Surtees in a Ferrari 158.

Jo Siffert was injured in a crash during the practice sessions, in which he rolled his Lotus 24.

During the race, Peter Arundell's Lotus developed gearbox trouble, and he swapped cars with Mike Spence. Arundell took the healthy Lotus to third place after a close fight with Lorenzo Bandini, while Spence retired the other one soon after the swap.

== Results ==
Pos	Driver	Entrant	Constructor	Time/Retired	Grid
1	(United Kingdom) John Surtees	SEFAC Ferrari	Ferrari	1.19:51.8	2
2	(Italy) Lorenzo Bandini	SEFAC Ferrari	Ferrari	+ 37.3	1
3	(United Kingdom) Mike Spence / Peter Arundell	Team Lotus	Lotus-Climax	+ 37.4	13
4	(Sweden) Jo Bonnier	Rob Walker Racing Team	Cooper-Climax	+ 1:09.2	6
5	(New Zealand) Chris Amon	Reg Parnell Racing	Lotus-BRM	+ 1:19.4	4
6	(United States) Masten Gregory	Scuderia Centro Sud	BRM	39 laps	12
7	(United Kingdom) Mike Hailwood	Reg Parnell Racing	Lotus-BRM	39 laps	3
8	(United Kingdom) Ian Raby	Ian Raby (Racing)	Brabham-BRM	36 laps	7
9	(United Kingdom) Jackie Epstein	Epstein-Eyre Racing Team	BRM	33 laps	14
Ret	(Switzerland) Jean-Claude Rudaz	Fabre Urbain	Cooper-Climax	Suspension	10
Ret	(Italy) Giancarlo Baghetti	Scuderia Centro Sud	BRM	Electrics	15
Ret	(United Kingdom) Peter Arundell / Mike Spence	Team Lotus	Lotus-Climax	Gearbox	11
Ret	(Belgium) André Pilette	Equipe Scirocco Belge	Scirocco-Climax	Gear linkage	8
Ret	(United States) Peter Revson	Revson Racing (America)	Lotus-BRM	Accident	9
DNS	(Switzerland) Jo Siffert	Siffert Racing Team	Lotus-BRM	Practice accident	(5)
DNQ	(Switzerland) André Wicky	André Wicky	Lotus-BRM		-
WD	(Netherlands) Carel Godin de Beaufort	Ecurie Maarsbergen	Porsche		-
WD	(United Kingdom) Bob Anderson	DW Racing Enterprises	Brabham-Climax	Car not delivered	-

- The first session practice times for Arundell and Spence were disallowed as punishment for missing scrutineering. The first session was dry, and the second was wet, so their times in the wet resulted in their low grid positions.

Previous race: 1964 News of the World Trophy	Formula One non-championship races 1964 season	Next race: 1964 Aintree 200
Previous race: 1963 Syracuse Grand Prix	Syracuse Grand Prix	Next race: 1965 Syracuse Grand Prix
