= 1955 Syracuse Grand Prix =

- Non-championship race in the 1955 Formula One season
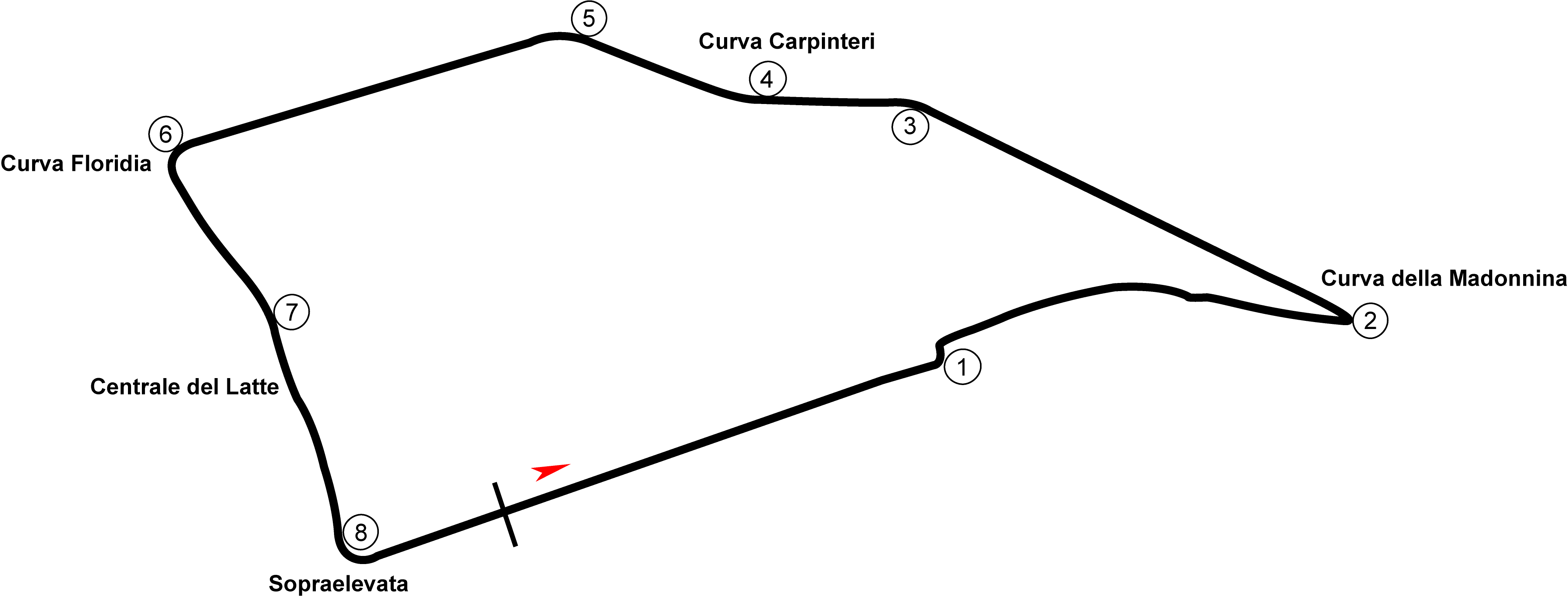

Race details
- Date: 23 October 1955
- Official name: Gran Premio di Siracusa
- Location: Syracuse, Sicily
- Course: Temporary road circuit
- Course length: 5.597 km (3.479 miles)
- Distance: 70 laps, 391.81 km (243.46 miles)

Pole position
Driver	(Italy) Luigi Musso	Maserati
- Time: 2:03.6

Fastest lap
Driver	(United Kingdom) Tony Brooks	Connaught
- Time: 2:00.2

Podium
First	(United Kingdom) Tony Brooks	Connaught
Second	(Italy) Luigi Musso	Maserati
Third	(Italy) Luigi Villoresi	Maserati

The 1955 Syracuse Grand Prix was a Formula One race, held on 23 October at the Syracuse Circuit in Sicily. The race was won by Tony Brooks, in his first Formula One race, driving a Connaught type B. This was the first international Grand Prix win for a British car since the 1924 San Sebastián Grand Prix.

== Background ==
After two fairly poor seasons, Connaught were close to running out of money, and were considering withdrawing from racing altogether. However they received an invitation to the Syracuse Grand Prix which included an offer of substantial starting money, so decided they would enter. They did not, however, have enough money to afford them an experienced driver. Instead they looked to dental student Tony Brooks, who had had some success in Aston Martin and Connaught sports cars earlier in the year but had never even driven a Formula One car before, as well as Formula Three driver Les Leston.

Although Ferrari did not enter, Maserati entered a full team of five cars, to the relief of the race organisers. Few expected the Maserati team to have any trouble against the Connaughts, Gordinis, several privately entered Maseratis and two privately entered Ferraris.

== Report ==
=== Practice/Qualifying ===
The first practice session was on Friday afternoon. As expected the works Maseratis dominated, with Luigi Musso and Luigi Villoresi (who had driven for Lancia earlier in the year before the team folded) easily the fastest. The Connaughts had yet to arrive, however, so Brooks and Leston attempted to learn the circuit on borrowed Vespas.

The Connaughts arrived on Saturday in time for the second practice session, the cars being ready immediately after arriving at the circuit after a five day journey across Europe. Musso and Villoresi went slower than on Friday as they had no reason to believe any of their competitors would be able to challenge their times, Musso's best having been 2 minutes and 5 seconds. However it took Brooks remarkably little time to familiarise himself with the circuit and was able to set fairly quick times, eventually down to 2 minutes and 6 seconds, fastest so far in the Saturday session. This was cause for concern in the Maserati pits, so Musson and Villoresi went back out to try to hold onto the first two starting positions. Eventually Musso got down to 2 minutes 3.6 seconds, Villoresi 2 minutes 4.7 seconds and Brooks not far behind with 2 minutes 5.4 seconds, which was enough to give him a front row start (on the 3–2–3 grid) ahead of the other works Maseratis, two of which were driven by Americans Carroll Shelby and Harry Schell, who shared the second row. None of the other drivers came close, with Robert Manzon in sixth place in the first of the two Gordinis and a second behind Schell.

=== Race ===
At the start the two Maseratis on the front row lead away, staying side-by-side for some way with Musso eventually taking the lead. Meanwhile Brooks, who hadn't practiced a race start in the Connaught, made a slow start. At the end of the first lap, Musso lead Villoresi, Schell and Brooks, followed by Leston in fifth place after starting from the fifth row of the grid. The order at the front remained for three laps before Brooks was able to overtake Schell. Over the following laps Brooks continued to close the gap on Villoresi until he was able to overtake him too by the tenth lap. Leston had spun off and dropped down the order.

On lap 11 Brooks was able to overtake Musso for the lead, but was unable to pull away and Musso retook the lead the next lap and on the following lap Brooks overtook again. For several laps Musso was almost touching Brooks' tail, and both drivers were lapping very fast, with the lap record being broken three times, first by Brooks, then twice by Musso. On several occasions Musso was able to temporarily get ahead of Brooks by braking later on approach to the hairpin roughly a third of the way into the lap, but Brooks was always able to take the lead back under acceleration. This suited Brooks as he knew the disc-brakes on his Connaught would last much longer than the drum-brakes on the Maserati, and so eventually Brooks started to pull away as Musso suffered brake fade.

By half distance Brooks lead Musso by 40 seconds and continued to pull away. He set the fastest lap of 2 minutes 00.2 seconds, 3.4 seconds faster than Musso's pole time, on lap 55, and then began to slow as it was clear Musso would not be able to catch him. Musso tried however, lowering the gap to 32 seconds at which point Brooks increased his pace again, eventually winning by just over 50 seconds, with Villoresi still third, two laps behind.

== Classification ==
=== Qualifying ===
Pos	No	Driver	Constructor	Time	Gap
1	12	(Italy) Luigi Musso	Maserati	2:03.6	
2	24	(Italy) Luigi Villoresi	Maserati	2:04.7	+1.1
3	22	(United Kingdom) Tony Brooks	Connaught	2:05.4	+1.8
4	28	(United States) Carroll Shelby	Maserati	2:08.0	+4.4
5	18	(United States) Harry Schell	Maserati	2:08.7	+5.1
6	22	(France) Robert Manzon	Gordini	2:09.7	+6.1
7	10	(United Kingdom) Horace Gould	Maserati	2:09.9	+6.3
8	4	(France) Louis Rosier	Maserati	2:10.9	+7.3
9	20	(France) Jacques Pollet	Gordini	2:12.1	+8.5
10	14	(United Kingdom) Roy Salvadori	Maserati	2:12.7	+9.1
11	26	(United Kingdom) Les Leston	Connaught	2:13.0	+9.4
12	8	(Italy) Luigi Piotti	Maserati	2:13.6	+10.0
13	6	(France) Jean-Claude Vidilles	Ferrari	2:14.2	+10.6
14	2	(Italy) Giorgio Scarlatti	Ferrari	2:30.4	+26.8
15	30	(Switzerland) Ottorino Volonterio	Maserati	2:58.4	+54.8

=== Race ===
Pos	No	Driver	Constructor	Laps	Time/Retired	Grid
1	22	(United Kingdom) Tony Brooks	Connaught	70	2h24m55.7	3
2	12	(Italy) Luigi Musso	Maserati	70	+50.5	1
3	24	(Italy) Luigi Villoresi	Maserati	68	+2 laps	2
4	10	(United Kingdom) Horace Gould	Maserati	68	+2 laps	7
5	18	(United States) Harry Schell	Maserati	68	+2 laps	5
6	28	(United States) Carroll Shelby	Maserati	66	+4 laps	4
NC	8	(Italy) Luigi Piotti	Maserati	62	+8 laps	12
NC	2	(Italy) Giorgio Scarlatti	Ferrari	62	+8 laps	14
NC	26	(United Kingdom) Les Leston	Connaught	62	+8 laps	11
Ret	6	(France) Jean-Claude Vidilles	Ferrari	24	Gearbox	13
Ret	22	(France) Robert Manzon	Gordini	22	Oil leak	6
Ret	30	(Switzerland) Ottorino Volonterio	Maserati	17	Transmission	15
Ret	4	(France) Louis Rosier	Maserati	17	Drag link	8
Ret	14	(United Kingdom) Roy Salvadori	Maserati	15	Fuel tank	10
Ret	20	(France) Jacques Pollet	Gordini	9	Rear axle	9

Previous race: 1955 Avon Trophy	Formula One non-championship races 1955 season	Next race: 1956 Glover Trophy
Previous race: 1954 Syracuse Grand Prix	Syracuse Grand Prix	Next race: 1956 Syracuse Grand Prix
