= 1956 Syracuse Grand Prix =

- Non-championship race in the 1956 Formula One season
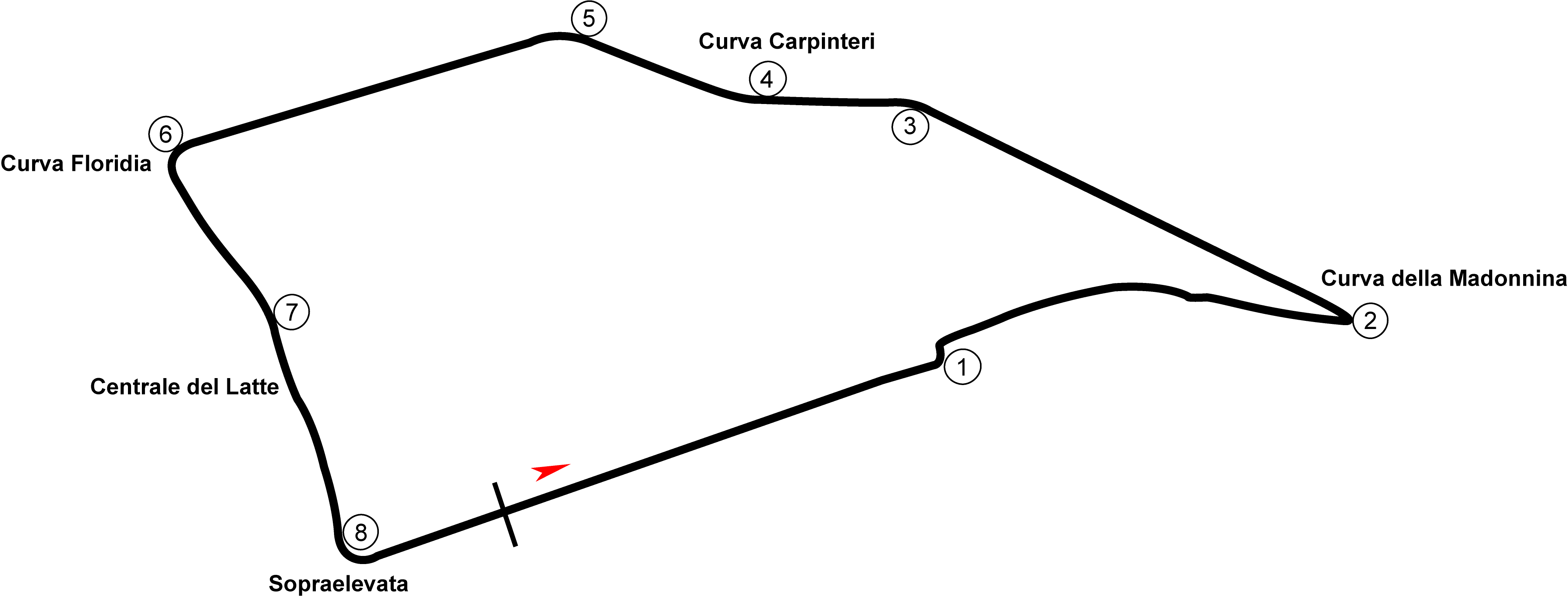

Race details
- Date: 15 April 1956
- Official name: VI Gran Premio di Siracusa
- Location: Syracuse, Sicily
- Course: Temporary road circuit
- Course length: 5.599 km (3.479 miles)
- Distance: 80 laps, 447.688 km (278.167 miles)

Pole position
Driver	(Argentina) Juan Manuel Fangio	Ferrari
- Time: 1:58.0

Fastest lap
Driver	(Argentina) Juan Manuel Fangio	Ferrari
- Time: 1:59.8

Podium
First	(Argentina) Juan Manuel Fangio	Ferrari
Second	(Italy) Luigi Musso	Ferrari
Third	(United Kingdom) Peter Collins	Ferrari

The 1956 Syracuse Grand Prix was a motor race, set to Formula One rules, held on 15 April 1956 at the Syracuse Circuit, Sicily. The race was won by Argentinean Juan Manuel Fangio, in his Scuderia Ferrari entered Lancia D50.

== Classification ==
=== Entry list ===
No	Driver	Entrant	Car	Engine
2	(Italy) Gerino Gerini	Scuderia Guastalla	Maserati 250F	Maserati
4	(Argentina) Juan Manuel Fangio	Scuderia Ferrari	Lancia D50	Lancia
6	(United Kingdom) Horace Gould	Gould's Garage	Maserati 250F	Maserati
8	(Italy) Giorgio Scarlatti	Giorgio Scarlatti	Ferrari 500	Ferrari
10	(Italy) Piero Scotti	Connaught Engineering	Connaught Type B	Alta
12	(Italy) Luigi Villoresi	Scuderia Centro Sud	Maserati 250F	Maserati
14	(Italy) Luigi Piotti	Luigi Piotti	Maserati 250F	Maserati
16	(Italy) Eugenio Castellotti	Scuderia Ferrari	Lancia D50	Lancia
18	(Italy) Berardo Taraschi	Berardo Taraschi	Ferrari 166	Ferrari
20	(Brazil) Hermano da Silva Ramos	Equipe Gordini	Gordini Type 16	Gordini
22	(United Kingdom) Desmond Titterington	Connaught Engineering	Connaught Type B	Alta
24	(France) Robert Manzon	Equipe Gordini	Gordini Type 16	Gordini
26	(Italy) Luigi Musso	Scuderia Ferrari	Lancia D50	Lancia
28	(United Kingdom) Peter Collins	Scuderia Ferrari	Lancia D50	Lancia
30	(France) Jean Behra	Officine Alfieri Maserati	Maserati 250F	Maserati

=== Qualifying ===
Pos	No	Driver	Constructor	Time	Gap
1	4	(Argentina) Juan Manuel Fangio	Ferrari	1:58.0	–
2	16	(Italy) Eugenio Castellotti	Ferrari	1:58.9	+0.9
3	30	(France) Jean Behra	Maserati	1:59.6	+1.6
4	26	(Italy) Luigi Musso	Ferrari	2:00.3	+2.3
5	12	(Italy) Luigi Villoresi	Maserati	2:01.5	+3.5
6	28	(United Kingdom) Peter Collins	Ferrari	2:02.1	+4.1
7	24	(France) Robert Manzon	Gordini	2:05.1	+7.1
8	22	(United Kingdom) Desmond Titterington	Connaught-Alta	2:06.6	+8.6
9	14	(Italy) Luigi Piotti	Maserati	2:07.1	+9.1
10	6	(United Kingdom) Horace Gould	Maserati	2:09.1	+11.1
11	2	(Italy) Gerino Gerini	Maserati	2:10.5	+12.5
12	20	(Brazil) Hermano da Silva Ramos	Gordini	2:11.8	+13.8
13	8	(Italy) Giorgio Scarlatti	Ferrari	-	-
14	18	(Italy) Berardo Taraschi	Ferrari	-	-
15	10	(Italy) Piero Scotti	Connaught-Alta	-	-

=== Race ===
Pos	No	Driver	Constructor	Laps	Time/Retired	Grid
1	4	(Argentina) Juan Manuel Fangio	Ferrari	80	2:48'59.9	1
2	26	(Italy) Luigi Musso	Ferrari	80	+0.2	4
3	28	(United Kingdom) Peter Collins	Ferrari	80	+0.5	6
4	12	(Italy) Luigi Villoresi	Maserati	77	+3 Laps	5
5	2	(Italy) Gerino Gerini	Maserati	77	+6 Laps	11
6	24	(France) Robert Manzon	Gordini	76	+4 Laps	7
7	24	(Italy) Luigi Piotti	Maserati	74	+6 Laps	9
Ret	20	(Brazil) Hermano da Silva Ramos	Gordini	42	Mechanical	12
Ret	16	(Italy) Eugenio Castellotti	Ferrari	40	Accident	2
Ret	22	(United Kingdom) Desmond Titterington	Connaught-Alta	23	Ignition	8
Ret	10	(Italy) Piero Scotti	Connaught-Alta	21	Gearbox	15
Ret	18	(Italy) Berardo Taraschi	Ferrari	20	Mechanical	14
Ret	8	(Italy) Giorgio Scarlatti	Ferrari	20	Mechanical	13
Ret	6	(United Kingdom) Horace Gould	Maserati	2	Final Drive	10
Ret	30	(France) Jean Behra	Maserati	1	Lubrication	3

Previous race: 1956 Glover Trophy	Formula One non-championship races 1956 season	Next race: 1956 BARC Aintree 200
Previous race: 1955 Syracuse Grand Prix	Syracuse Grand Prix	Next race: 1957 Syracuse Grand Prix
