= 1954 Syracuse Grand Prix =

- Non-championship race in the 1954 Formula One season
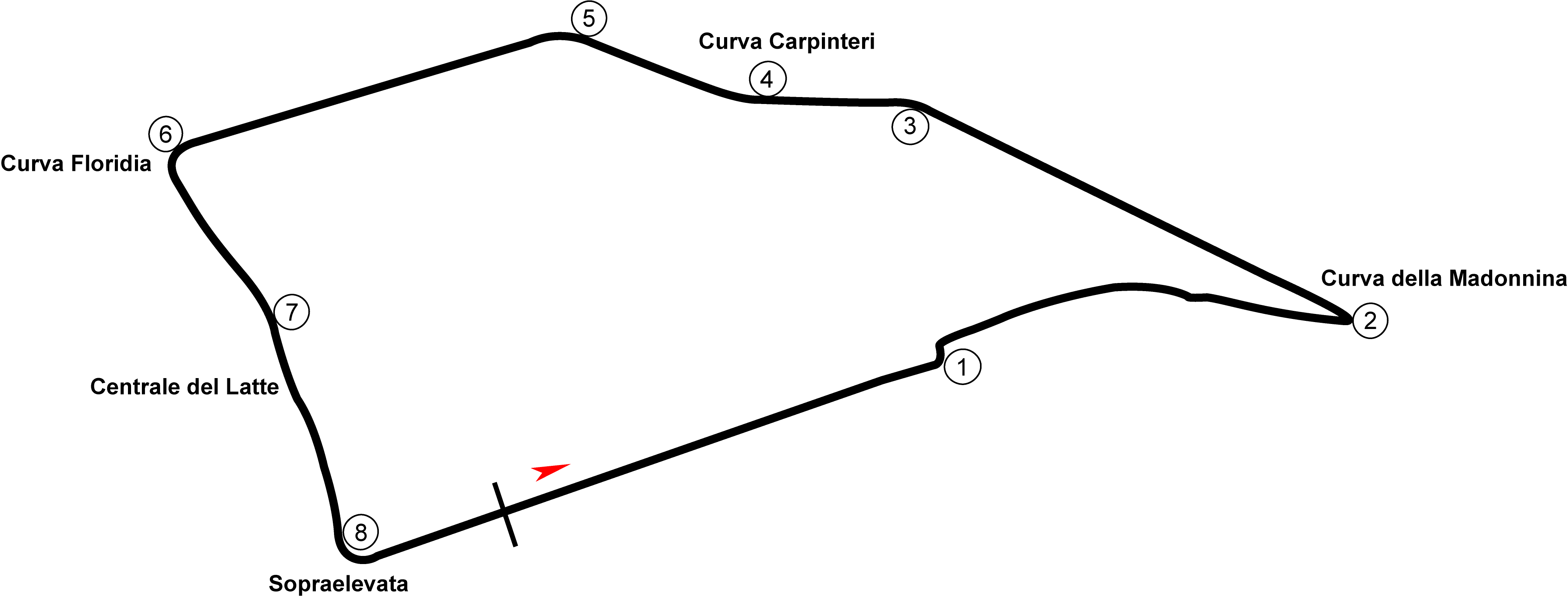

Race details
- Date: 11 April 1954
- Official name: Gran Premio di Siracusa
- Location: Syracuse, Sicily
- Course: Temporary road circuit
- Course length: 5.597 km (3.479 miles)
- Distance: 80 laps, 446.30 km (278.24 miles)

Pole position
| Driver | (Argentina) Onofre Marimón | Maserati |
- Time: 2:02.6

Fastest lap
| Driver | (Argentina) Onofre Marimón | Maserati |
- Time: 2:03.8

Podium
| First | (Italy) Giuseppe Farina | Ferrari |
| Second | (France) Maurice Trintignant | Ferrari |
| Third | (Italy) Sergio Mantovani | Maserati |

The 1954 Syracuse Grand Prix was a Formula One race, held on 11 April at the Syracuse Circuit in Sicily. The race was won by Giuseppe Farina driving a Ferrari 625.

== Classification ==
=== Qualifying ===
| Pos | No | Driver | Entrant | Time | Gap |
|---|---|---|---|---|---|
| 1 | 18 | (Argentina) Onofre Marimón | Officine Alfieri Maserati | 2:02.6 | |
| 2 | 4 | (Argentina) José Froilán González | Scuderia Ferrari | 2:02.6 | |
| 3 | 2 | (Italy) Giuseppe Farina | Scuderia Ferrari | 2:03.0 | +0.4 |
| 4 | 6 | (United Kingdom) Mike Hawthorn | Scuderia Ferrari | 2:08.0 | +4.4 |
| 5 | 8 | (France) Maurice Trintignant | Scuderia Ferrari | | |
| 6 | 16 | (Italy) Sergio Mantovani | Officine Alfieri Maserati | | |
| 7 | 12 | (Belgium) Roger Laurent | Ecurie Francorchamps | | |
| 8 | 10 | (France) Robert Manzon | Robert Manzon | | |
| | 14 | (Argentina) Juan Manuel Fangio | Officine Alfieri Maserati | DNA | |
| | 20 | (Thailand) B. Bira | Prince Bira | DNA | |
| | 22 | (United States) Harry Schell | Harry Schell | DNA | |
| | 24 | (Argentina) Roberto Mieres | Roberto Mieres | DNA | |
| | 26 | (France) Giovanni de Riu | Giovanni de Riu | DNA | |

=== Race ===
| Pos | No. | Driver | Car | Laps | Time/Retired | Grid |
|---|---|---|---|---|---|---|
| 1 | 2 | (Italy) Giuseppe Farina | Ferrari 625 | 80 | 2h21m57.2 | 3 |
| 2 | 8 | (France) Maurice Trintignant | Ferrari 625 | 78 | +2 laps | 5 |
| 3 | 16 | (Italy) Sergio Mantovani | Maserati 250F | 75 | +5 laps | 6 |
| 4 | 12 | (Belgium) Roger Laurent | Ferrari 625 | 73 | +7 laps | 7 |
| 5 | 18 | (Argentina) Onofre Marimón | Maserati 250F | 71 | +9 laps | 1 |
| 6 | 10 | (France) Robert Manzon | Ferrari 625 | 68 | +12 laps | 8 |
| NC | 4 | (Argentina) José Froilán González | Ferrari 553 | 6 | stopped to help Hawthorn | 2 |
| NC | 6 | (United Kingdom) Mike Hawthorn | Ferrari 625 | 6 | crash | 4 |

| Previous race: 1953 Curtis Trophy | Formula One non-championship races 1954 season | Next race: 1954 Pau Grand Prix |
| Previous race: 1953 Syracuse Grand Prix | Syracuse Grand Prix | Next race: 1955 Syracuse Grand Prix |
