= 1958 Syracuse Grand Prix =

- Non-championship race in the 1958 Formula One season
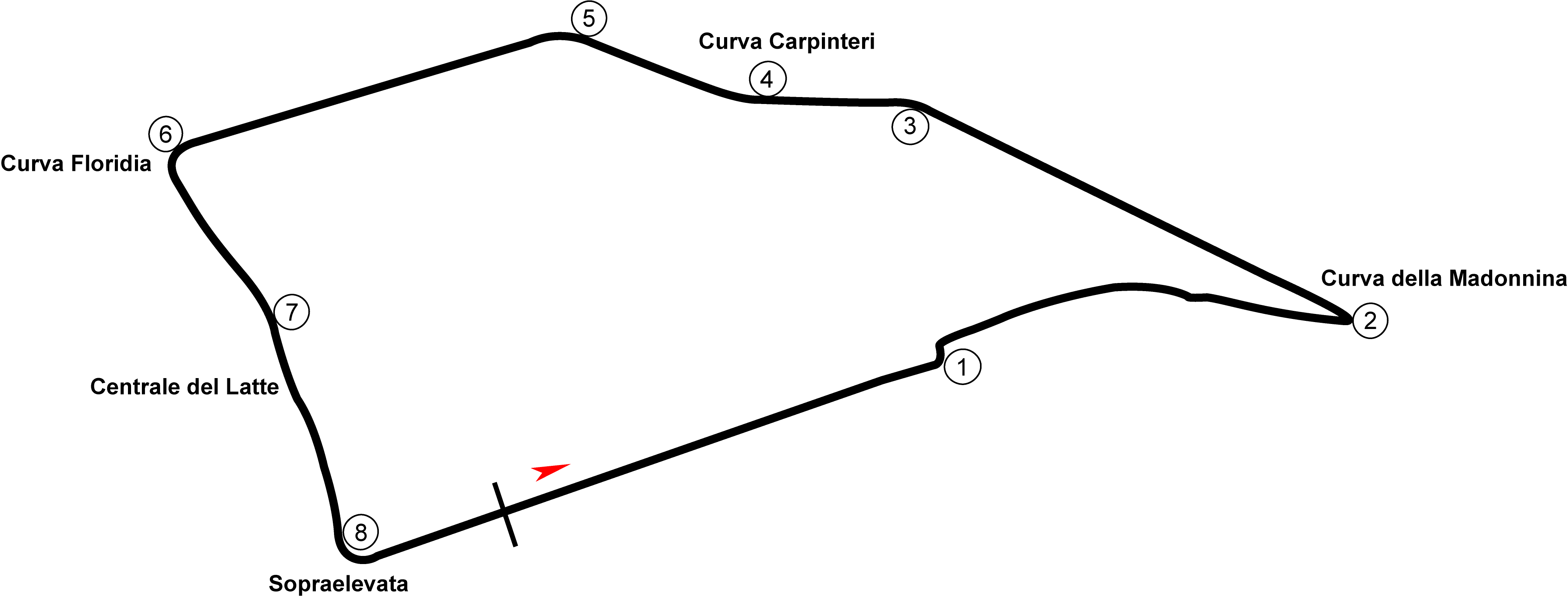

Race details
- Date: 13 April 1958
- Official name: VIII Gran Premio di Siracusa
- Location: Syracuse Circuit, Syracuse, Sicily
- Course: Temporary road circuit
- Course length: 5.60 km (3.48 miles)
- Distance: 60 laps, 336.00 km (208.77 miles)

Pole position
Driver	(Italy) Luigi Musso	Ferrari
- Time: 1:58.4

Fastest lap
Driver	(Italy) Luigi Musso	Ferrari
- Time: 1:59.1

Podium
First	(Italy) Luigi Musso	Ferrari
Second	(Sweden) Jo Bonnier	Maserati
Third	(Spain) Francesco Godia-Sales	Maserati

The 8th Syracuse Grand Prix was a motor race, run to Formula One rules, held on 13 April 1958 at Syracuse Circuit, Sicily. The race was run over 60 laps of the circuit, and was won by Italian driver Luigi Musso in a Ferrari Dino 246, who also took pole position and fastest lap.

== Results ==
Pos	No.	Driver	Entrant	Constructor	Time/Retired	Grid
1	12	(Italy) Luigi Musso	Scuderia Ferrari	Ferrari Dino 246	2h 2m 44.5s, 161.33 km/h	1
2	10	(Sweden) Jo Bonnier	Joakim Bonnier	Maserati 250F	2h 4m 16.9s, 59 laps	3
3	20	(Spain) Chico Godia	Francesco Godia-Sales	Maserati 250F	58 laps	4
4	4	(United Kingdom) Horace Gould	Horace Gould	Maserati 250F	57 laps	6
5	6	(Italy) Maria Teresa de Filippis	Maria Teresa de Filippis	Maserati 250F	56 laps	8
6	14	(Australia) Ken Kavanagh	Ken Kavanagh	Maserati 250F	54 laps	9
Ret.	24	(Monaco) Andre Testut	Andre Testut	Maserati 250F	51 laps - engine	12
Ret.	22	(United States) Masten Gregory	Scuderia Centro Sud	Maserati 250F	36 laps - con-rod	5
Ret.	28	(Italy) Giorgio Scarlatti	Giorgio Scarlatti	Maserati 250F	33 laps - magneto	2
Ret.	8	(Spain) Antonio Creus	Antonio Creus	Maserati 250F	26 laps - crash	10
Ret.	18	(Germany) Wolfgang Seidel	Scuderia Centro Sud	Maserati 250F	18 laps - water in fuel	7
Ret.	2	(Italy) Giulio Cabianca	Officine Specializate Costruzione Automobili	OSCA F2	2 laps - magneto	11
DNA	16	(United States) Carroll Smith	Carroll Smith	Cooper T43-Climax		-
DNA	26	(United Kingdom) Geoff Richardson	Geoff Richardson	Connaught Type B-Alta		-

Previous race: 1958 Glover Trophy	Formula One non-championship races 1958 season	Next race: 1958 BARC Aintree 200
Previous race: 1957 Syracuse Grand Prix	Syracuse Grand Prix	Next race: 1959 Syracuse Grand Prix
