= 1957 Buenos Aires Grand Prix =

- Non-championship race in the 1957 Formula One season

Race details
- Date: 27 January 1957
- Official name: XI Gran Premio Ciudad de Buenos Aires
- Location: Autódromo Oscar y Juan Gálvez, Buenos Aires
- Course: Permanent racing facility
- Course length: 4.556 km (2.840 miles)
- Distance: 60 (2 x 30) laps, 273.978 km (170.809 miles)

Pole position
| Driver | (Argentina) Juan Manuel Fangio | Maserati |
- Time: 2:17.9

Fastest lap
| Drivers | (Argentina) Juan Manuel Fangio | Maserati |
| | (United Kingdom) Peter Collins | Ferrari |
- Time: 2:19.6

Podium
| First | (Argentina) Juan Manuel Fangio | Maserati |
| Second | (France) Jean Behra | Maserati |
| Third | (Italy) Luigi Musso; (United Kingdom) Peter Collins | Ferrari |

The 1957 Buenos Aires Grand Prix was a Formula Libre race held at Buenos Aires on 27 January 1957, at the Autódromo Oscar Alfredo Gálvez. The race was held over two heats of 30 laps each, with the result declared as an aggregate of the two. Juan Manuel Fangio finished first and third, his aggregate time giving him a win only 25 seconds ahead of Jean Behra's two second places. The race was run in extremely hot conditions which led to several cases of driver exhaustion, with some retiring and handing over to a team mate.

== Classification ==
| Pos | No | Driver | Entrant | Car | Time/Retired |
|---|---|---|---|---|---|
| 1 | 2 | (Argentina) Juan Manuel Fangio | Officine Alfieri Maserati | Maserati 250F | 2h22m30.3, 119.18kph |
| 2 | 6 | (France) Jean Behra | Officine Alfieri Maserati | Maserati 250F | +24.8s |
| 3 | 12 | (Italy) Luigi Musso (United Kingdom) Peter Collins | Scuderia Ferrari | Lancia Ferrari D-50 | +1:26.9 |
| 4 | 16 | (United Kingdom) Mike Hawthorn | Scuderia Ferrari | Lancia Ferrari D-50 | +2:05.3 |
| 5 | 14 | (Italy) Eugenio Castellotti (Italy) Luigi Musso | Scuderia Ferrari | Lancia Ferrari D-50 | +2:13.3 |
| 6 | 8 | (Argentina) Carlos Menditéguy (United Kingdom) Stirling Moss | Officine Alfieri Maserati | Maserati 250F | +3:30.2 |
| 7 | 18 | (Italy) Cesare Perdisa | Scuderia Ferrari | Lancia Ferrari D-50 | 59 laps |
| 8 | 20 | (Germany) Wolfgang von Trips (United Kingdom) Peter Collins | Scuderia Ferrari | Lancia Ferrari D-50 | 59 laps |
| 9 | 28 | (Argentina) Alejandro de Tomaso (Italy) Luigi Piotti | Luigi Piotti | Maserati 250F | 55 laps |
| 10 | 22 | (United States) Harry Schell | Scuderia Centro Sud | Maserati 250F | 51 laps |
| Ret | 10 | (United Kingdom) Peter Collins (United States) Masten Gregory | Scuderia Ferrari | Lancia Ferrari D-50 | 40 laps |
| Ret | 26 | (Argentina) Enrique Sticoni | Scuderia Centro Sud | Maserati 250F | 29 laps |
| Ret | 4 | (United Kingdom) Stirling Moss | Officine Alfieri Maserati | Maserati 250F | 24 laps |
| Ret | 30 | (Argentina) José Froilán González | José Froilán González | Ferrari 625 | 23 laps |
| Ret | 24 | (Italy) Giorgio Scarlatti | Scuderia Centro Sud | Maserati 250F | 3 laps |

| Previous race: 1956 BRSCC Formula 1 Race | Formula One non-championship races 1957 season | Next race: 1957 Syracuse Grand Prix |
| Previous race: 1956 Buenos Aires Grand Prix | Buenos Aires Grand Prix | Next race: 1958 Buenos Aires Grand Prix |
