= 1965 Syracuse Grand Prix =

- Non-championship race in the 1965 Formula One season
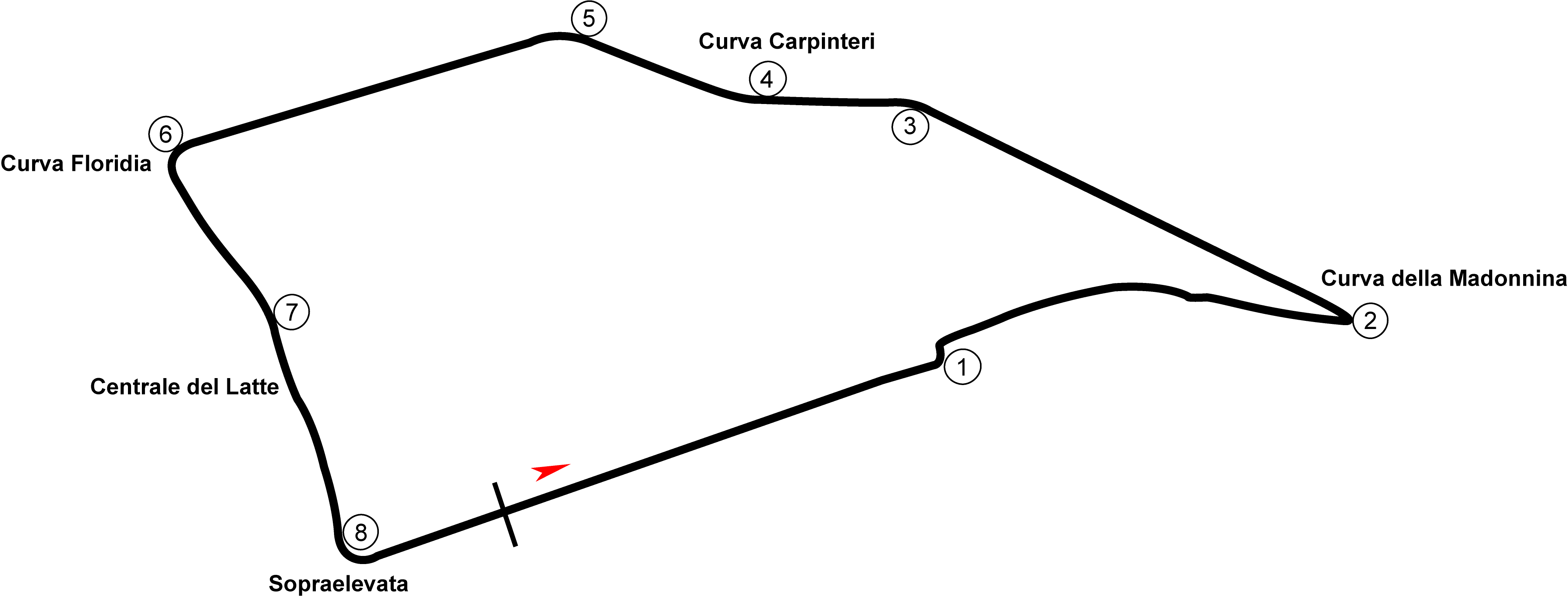

Race details
- Date: 4 April 1965
- Official name: XIV Gran Premio di Siracusa
- Location: Syracuse Circuit, Syracuse, Sicily
- Course: Temporary road circuit
- Course length: 5.612 km (3.487 miles)
- Distance: 56 laps, 314.43 km (195.27 miles)

Pole position
Driver	(United Kingdom) Jim Clark	Lotus-Climax
- Time: 1:46.5

Fastest lap
Driver	(United Kingdom) Jim Clark	Lotus-Climax
- Time: 1:46.0

Podium
First	(United Kingdom) Jim Clark	Lotus-Climax
Second	(United Kingdom) John Surtees	Ferrari
Third	(Italy) Lorenzo Bandini	Ferrari

The 14th Syracuse Grand Prix was a motor race, run to Formula One rules, held on 4 April 1965 at Syracuse Circuit, Sicily. The race was run over 56 laps of the circuit, and was won by British driver Jim Clark in a Lotus 33.

== Results ==
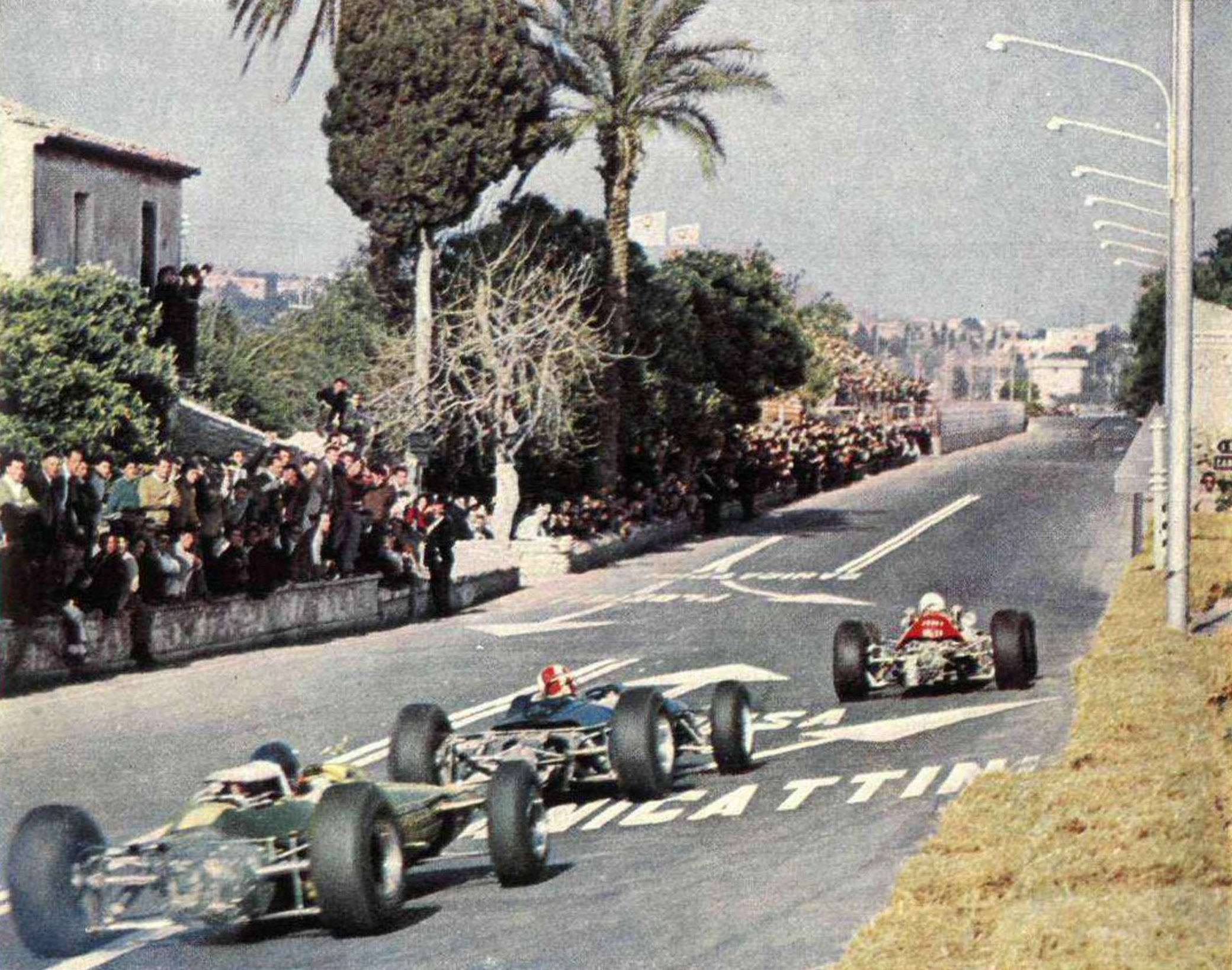
Surtees' Ferrari 158 leads the race ahead Siffert's Brabham BT11 and Clark's Lotus 33 on the main straight. Clark won the race ahead of Surtees, while Siffert was forced to retire due to overheating on lap 44.

Pos	Driver	Entrant	Constructor	Time/Retired	Grid
1	(United Kingdom) Jim Clark	Team Lotus	Lotus-Climax	1.43:47.0	1
2	(United Kingdom) John Surtees	SEFAC Ferrari	Ferrari	+ 42.1 s	2
3	(Italy) Lorenzo Bandini	SEFAC Ferrari	Ferrari	+ 56.3 s	5
4	(Sweden) Jo Bonnier	Rob Walker Racing Team	Brabham-Climax	55 laps	3
5	(Italy) Ludovico Scarfiotti	Scuderia Centro Sud	BRM	54 laps	9
6	(United Kingdom) Bob Anderson	DW Racing Enterprises	Brabham-Climax	47 laps	11
7	(France) Bernard Collomb	Bernard Collomb	Lotus-Climax	47 laps	14
8	(United Kingdom) Ian Raby	Ian Raby (Racing)	Brabham-BRM	47 laps	12
9	(Switzerland) André Wicky	André Wicky	Lotus-BRM	34 laps	15
Ret	(Switzerland) Jo Siffert	Rob Walker Racing Team	Brabham-BRM	Con-rod	4
Ret	(United Kingdom) Mike Spence	Team Lotus	Lotus-Climax	Accident	6
Ret	(United States) Masten Gregory	Scuderia Centro Sud	BRM	Suspension	10
Ret	(United Kingdom) Mike Hailwood	Reg Parnell (Racing)	Lotus-BRM	Ignition / accident	8
Ret	(United Kingdom) Innes Ireland	Reg Parnell (Racing)	Lotus-BRM	Gearbox	7
DNS	(Italy) Roberto Bussinello	Scuderia Centro Sud	BRM	Gearbox in practice	(13)
WD	(Australia) Paul Hawkins	DW Racing Enterprises	Lotus-Climax		-

Previous race: 1965 Race of Champions	Formula One non-championship races 1965 season	Next race: 1965 Sunday Mirror Trophy
Previous race: 1964 Syracuse Grand Prix	Syracuse Grand Prix	Next race: 1966 Syracuse Grand Prix
