= 1961 Syracuse Grand Prix =

- Non-championship race in the 1961 Formula One season
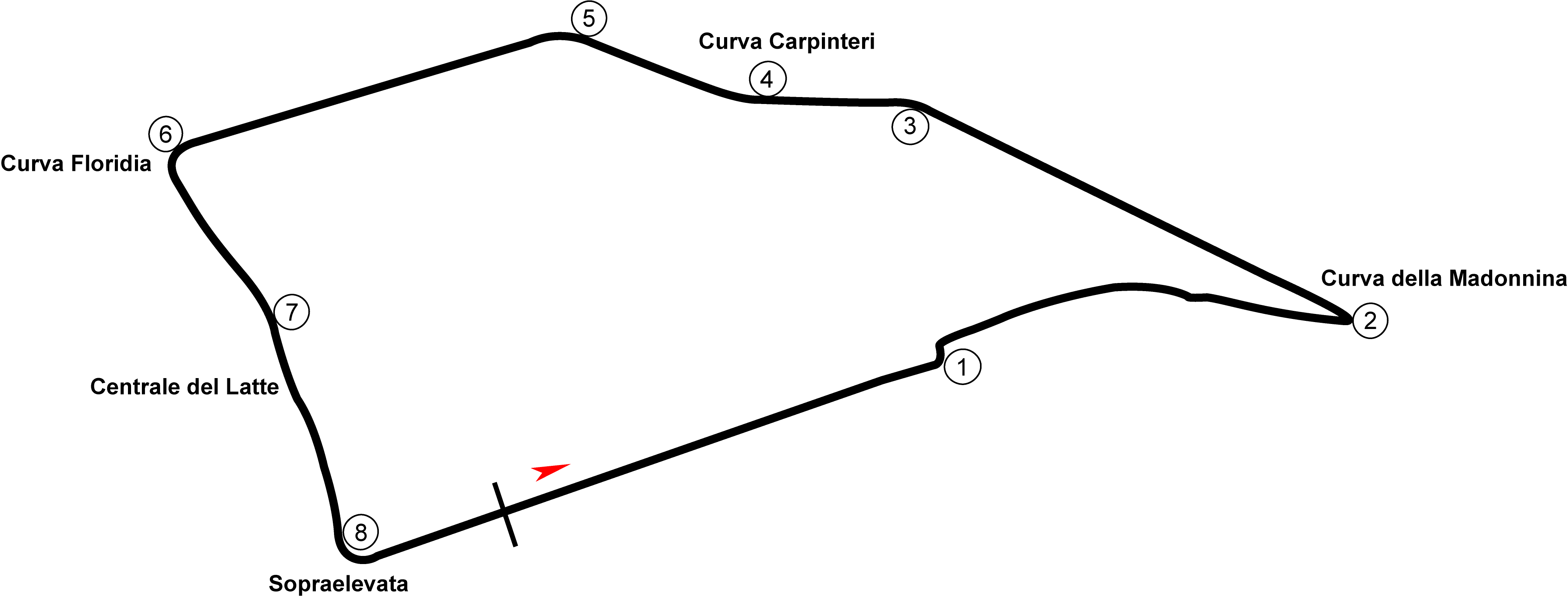

Race details
- Date: 25 April 1961
- Official name: XI Gran Premio di Siracusa
- Location: Syracuse Circuit, Syracuse, Sicily
- Course: Temporary road circuit
- Course length: 5.612 km (3.487 miles)
- Distance: 56 laps, 314.26 km (195.27 miles)

Pole position
Driver	(United States) Dan Gurney	Porsche
- Time: 1:56.8

Fastest lap
Driver	(United States) Dan Gurney	Porsche
- Time: 1:54.9

Podium
First	(Italy) Giancarlo Baghetti	Ferrari
Second	(United States) Dan Gurney	Porsche
Third	(Sweden) Jo Bonnier	Porsche

The 11th Syracuse Grand Prix was a motor race, run to Formula One rules, held on 25 April 1961 at Syracuse Circuit, Sicily. The race was run over 56 laps of the circuit, and was won by Italian driver Giancarlo Baghetti in a Ferrari 156 in his first Formula One race, the only driver to achieve this feat. Baghetti went on to win his next two Formula One races, including his first World Championship race.

== Results ==
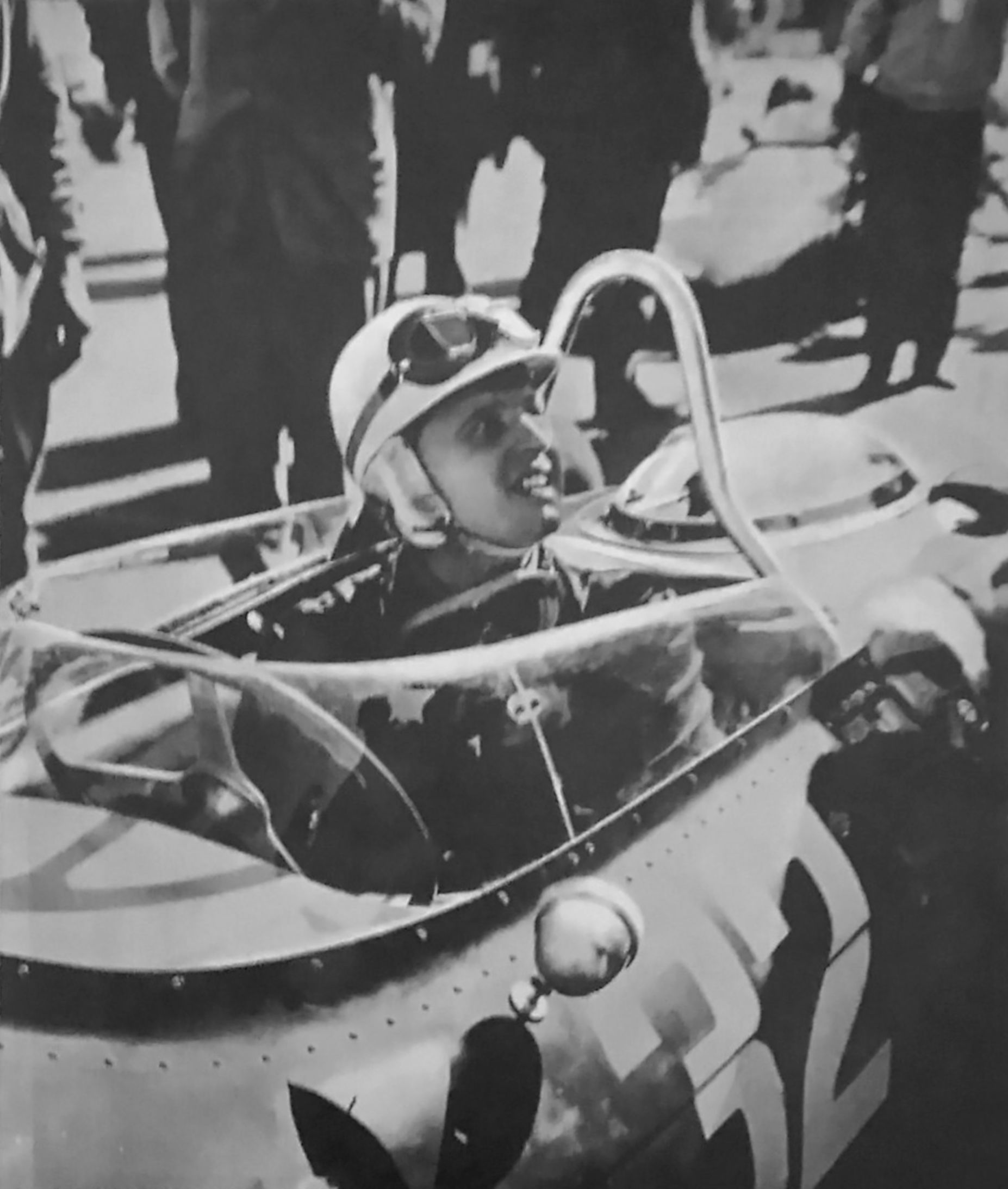
Race winner Giancarlo Baghetti in his Ferrari 156 F1 prior the start

Pos	Driver	Entrant	Constructor	Time/Retired	Grid
1	(Italy) Giancarlo Baghetti	FISA	Ferrari	1.50:08.2	2
2	(United States) Dan Gurney	Porsche System Engineering	Porsche	+ 5.0 s	1
3	(Sweden) Jo Bonnier	Porsche System Engineering	Porsche	55 laps	6
4	(Australia) Jack Brabham	Cooper Car Company	Cooper-Climax	55 laps	5
5	(United Kingdom) Roy Salvadori	Yeoman Credit Racing Team	Cooper-Climax	55 laps	8
6	(United Kingdom) Jim Clark	Team Lotus	Lotus-Climax	53 laps	12
7	(Italy) Lorenzo Bandini	Scuderia Centro Sud	Cooper-Maserati	53 laps	10
8	(United Kingdom) Stirling Moss	Rob Walker Racing Team	Lotus-Climax	52 laps	7
NC	(United Kingdom) Graham Hill	Owen Racing Organisation	BRM-Climax	52 laps	4
9	(Italy) Menato Boffa	Menato Boffa	Cooper-Climax	49 laps	17
10	(Germany) Wolfgang Seidel	Scuderia Colonia	Lotus-Climax	49 laps	19
11	(Belgium) Willy Mairesse	Equipe Nationale Belge	Emeryson-Maserati	42 laps	16
12	(Italy) Renato Pirocchi	Pescara Racing Club	Cooper-Climax	37 laps	18
Ret	(United Kingdom) Innes Ireland	Team Lotus	Lotus-Climax	Accident	9
Ret	(Italy) Massimo Natili	Scuderia Centro Sud	Cooper-Maserati	Engine	13
Ret	(France) Maurice Trintignant	Scuderia Serenissima	Cooper-Maserati	Piston	15
Ret	(United Kingdom) Tony Brooks	Owen Racing Organisation	BRM-Climax	Con-rod	14
Ret	(United Kingdom) John Surtees	Yeoman Credit Racing Team	Cooper-Climax	Fuel pump	3
Ret	(Belgium) Olivier Gendebien	Equipe Nationale Belge	Emeryson-Maserati	Gearbox	11
DNQ	(Italy) Ernesto Prinoth	Scuderia Dolomiti	Lotus-Climax		-
DNQ	(Italy) Giuseppe Maugeri	Giuseppe Maugeri	Cooper-Climax		-
DNQ	(Italy) Gino Munaron	Gino Munaron	Cooper-Alfa Romeo		-
WD	(United Kingdom) Cliff Allison	UDT Laystall Racing Team	Lotus-Climax		-
WD	(New Zealand) Bruce McLaren	Cooper Car Company	Cooper-Climax		-
WD	(United States) Richie Ginther	SEFAC Ferrari	Ferrari	Car not ready	-
WD	(Italy) Giorgio Scarlatti	Scuderia Serenissima	Cooper-Climax	Car not ready	-
WD	(United Kingdom) Henry Taylor	UDT Laystall Racing Team	Lotus-Climax		-

Previous race: 1961 Aintree 200	Formula One non-championship races 1961 season	Next race: 1961 BRDC International Trophy
Previous race: 1960 Syracuse Grand Prix	Syracuse Grand Prix	Next race: 1963 Syracuse Grand Prix
