= Syracuse Grand Prix =

Non-championship motor race in Sicily, Italy

- Syracuse Circuit
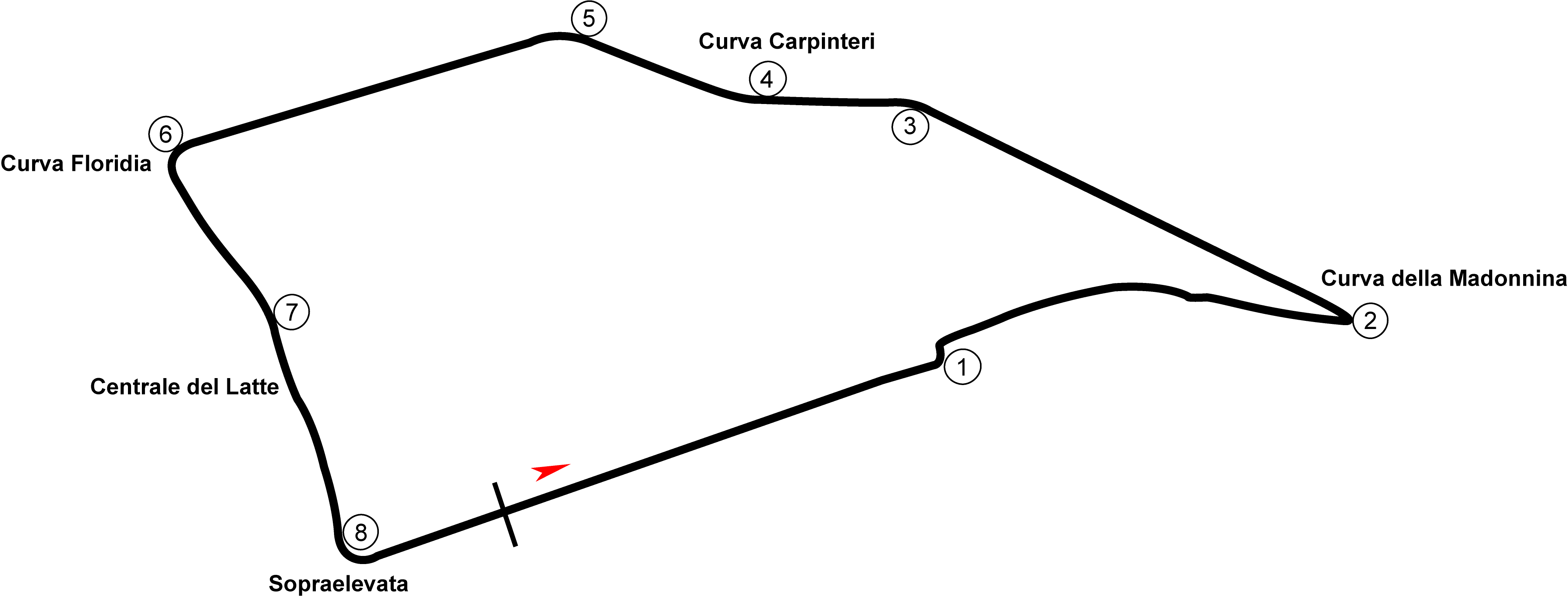

Race information
- Number of times held: 16
- First held: 1951
- Last held: 1967
- Most wins (drivers): (United Kingdom) John Surtees (2 wins)
- Most wins (constructors): (Italy) Ferrari (9 wins)
- Circuit length: 5.598 km (3.478 miles)

The Syracuse Grand Prix was a motor race held at Syracuse Circuit in Sicily, Italy. For most of its existence, it formed part of the Formula One non-Championship calendar, usually being held near the beginning of the season before the World Championship races.

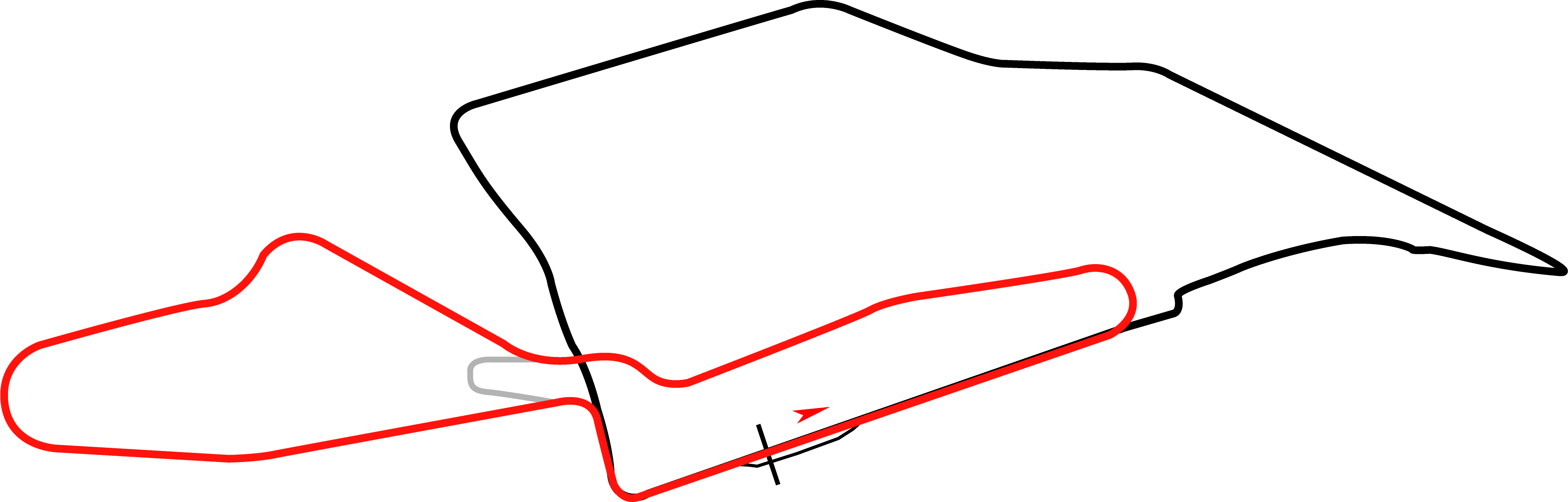
Comparison of the old and revival layouts of Syracuse Circuit

== Results ==
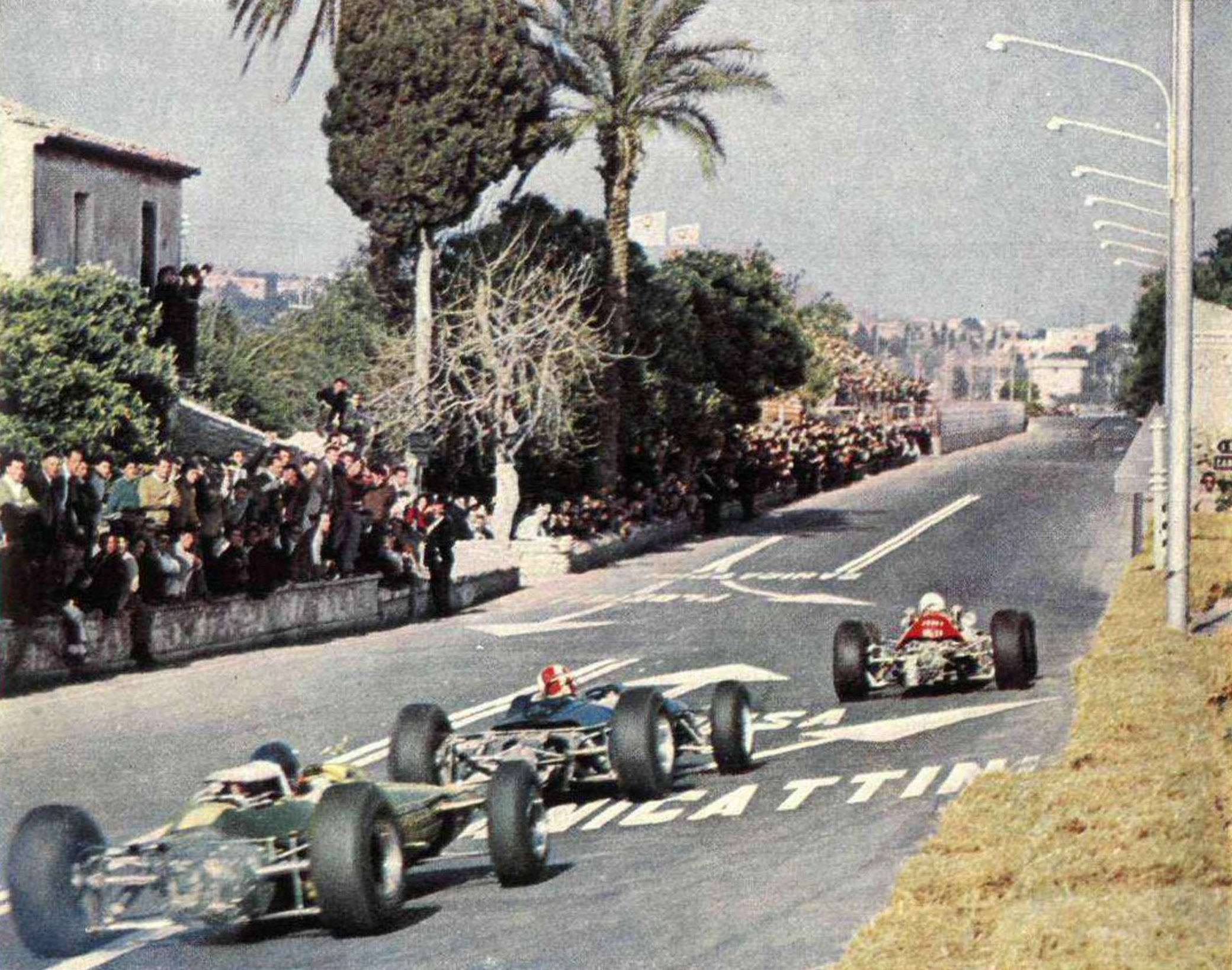
John Surtees' Ferrari 158 ahead Jo Siffert's Brabham BT11 and Jim Clark's Lotus 33 in the 1965 edition.

Formula 2 events

Year	Date	Winning driver	Winning constructor	Report
1951	March 11	(Italy) Luigi Villoresi	Ferrari	Report
1952	March 16	(Italy) Alberto Ascari	Ferrari	Report
1953	March 22	(Switzerland) Toulo de Graffenried	Maserati	Report
1954	April 11	(Italy) Giuseppe Farina	Ferrari	Report
1955	October 23	(United Kingdom) Tony Brooks	Connaught	Report
1956	April 15	(Argentina) Juan Manuel Fangio	Lancia-Ferrari	Report
1957	April 7	(United Kingdom) Peter Collins	Lancia-Ferrari	Report
1958	April 13	(Italy) Luigi Musso	Ferrari	Report
1959	April 25	(United Kingdom) Stirling Moss	Cooper-Borgward	Report
1960	March 19	(West Germany) Wolfgang von Trips	Ferrari	Report
1961	April 25	(Italy) Giancarlo Baghetti	Ferrari	Report
1962	not held			
1963	April 25	(Switzerland) Jo Siffert	Lotus-BRM	Report
1964	April 12	(United Kingdom) John Surtees	Ferrari	Report
1965	April 4	(United Kingdom) Jim Clark	Lotus-Climax	Report
1966	May 1	(United Kingdom) John Surtees	Ferrari	Report
1967	May 21	(United Kingdom) Mike Parkes (Italy) Ludovico Scarfiotti (Dead heat)	Ferrari	Report
