= 1964 News of the World Trophy =

- Non-championship race in the 1964 Formula One season

Race details
- Date: 30 March 1964
- Official name: I News of the World Trophy
- Location: Goodwood Circuit, West Sussex
- Course: Permanent racing facility
- Course length: 3.862 km (2.4 miles)
- Distance: 42 laps, 162.2 km (100.8 miles)

Pole position
Driver	(Australia) Jack Brabham	Brabham-Climax
- Time: 1:21.0

Fastest lap
Driver	(United Kingdom) Graham Hill	BRM
- Time: 1:21.0

Podium
First	(United Kingdom) Jim Clark	Lotus-Climax
Second	(United Kingdom) Peter Arundell	Lotus-Climax
Third	(United Kingdom) Trevor Taylor	Lotus-BRM

The 1st News of the World Trophy was a motor race, run to Formula One rules, held on 30 March 1964 at Goodwood Circuit, England. The race was run over 42 laps of the circuit, and was won by British driver Jim Clark in a Lotus 25, after Graham Hill dropped out having led for 40 laps.

== Results ==
Pos	Driver	Entrant	Constructor	Time/Retired	Grid
1	(United Kingdom) Jim Clark	Team Lotus	Lotus-Climax	57:39.0	2
2	(United Kingdom) Peter Arundell	Team Lotus	Lotus-Climax	+ 1:21.6	4
3	(United Kingdom) Trevor Taylor	British Racing Partnership	Lotus-BRM	41 laps	8
4	(United Kingdom) Richard Attwood	Owen Racing Organisation	BRM	41 laps	9
5	(United Kingdom) Mike Hailwood	Reg Parnell Racing	Lotus-BRM	40 laps	16
6	(Belgium) André Pilette	Equipe Scirocco Belge	Scirocco-Climax	37 laps	15
7	(United Kingdom) John Taylor	Gerard Racing	Cooper-Ford	37 laps	11
8	(United States) Peter Revson	Revson Racing (America)	Lotus-BRM	35 laps	13
9	(Italy) Giancarlo Baghetti	Scuderia Centro Sud	BRM	35 laps	10
Ret	(United Kingdom) Graham Hill	Owen Racing Organisation	BRM	Rotor arm	3
Ret	(Sweden) Jo Bonnier	Rob Walker Racing Team	Cooper-Climax	Accident	7
Ret	(France) Bernard Collomb	Bernard Collomb	Lotus-Climax	Accident	14
Ret	(United Kingdom) Ian Raby	Ian Raby (Racing)	Brabham-BRM	Ignition	12
Ret	(Australia) Jack Brabham	Brabham Racing Organisation	Brabham-Climax	Wheel rim	1
Ret	(United Kingdom) Innes Ireland	British Racing Partnership	BRP-BRM	Accident	5
Ret	(New Zealand) Bruce McLaren	Cooper Car Company	Cooper-Climax	Accident	6
WD	(United States) Phil Hill	Cooper Car Company	Cooper-Climax		-
WD	(New Zealand) Chris Amon	Reg Parnell Racing	Lotus-BRM		-
WD	(Switzerland) André Wicky	André Wicky	Lotus-BRM		-

- Three other cars were entered, two for SEFAC Ferrari, and one for the Brabham Racing Organisation. All three were withdrawn before the event, with no drivers named.

Previous race: 1964 Daily Mirror Trophy	Formula One non-championship races 1964 season	Next race: 1964 Syracuse Grand Prix
Previous race: —	News of the World Trophy	Next race: —
