= 1966 Syracuse Grand Prix =

- Non-championship race in the 1966 Formula One season
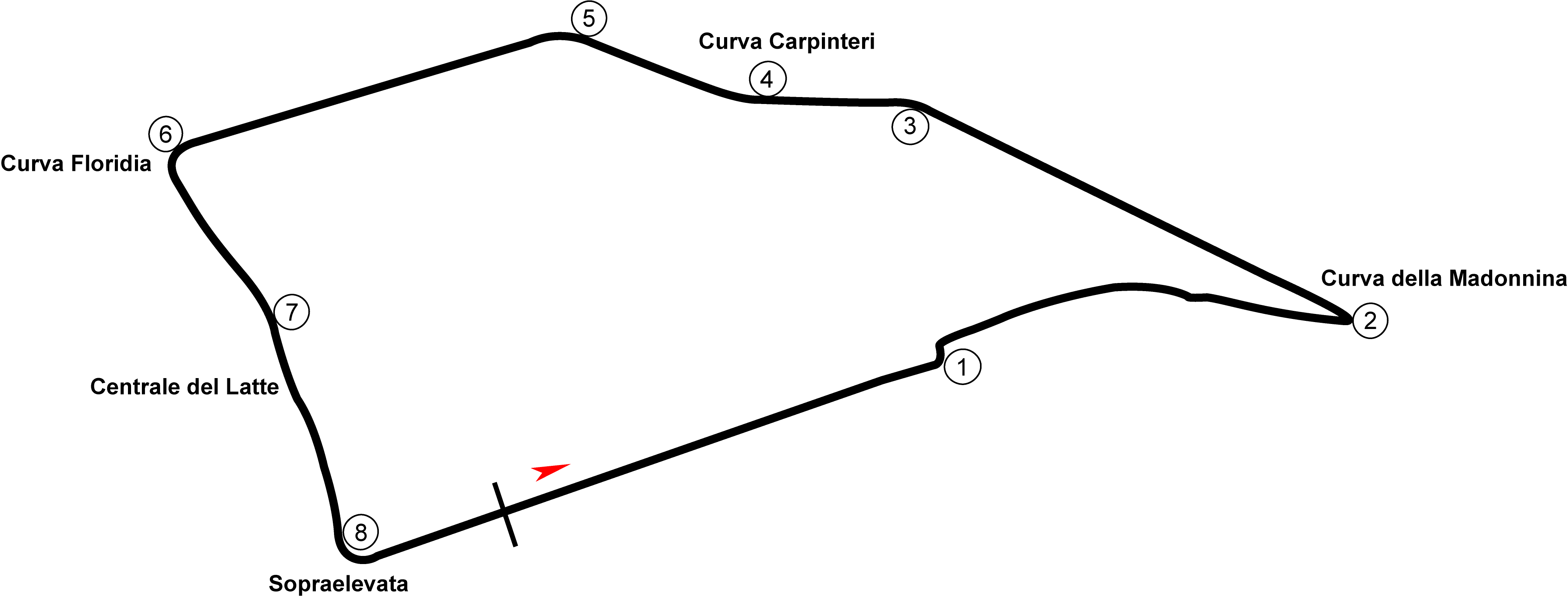

Race details
- Date: 1 May 1966
- Official name: XV Gran Premio di Siracusa
- Location: Syracuse Circuit, Syracuse, Sicily
- Course: Temporary road circuit
- Course length: 5.615 km (3.489 miles)
- Distance: 56 laps, 314.46 km (195.4 miles)

Pole position
Driver	(United Kingdom) John Surtees	Ferrari
- Time: 1:42.3

Fastest lap
Driver	(United Kingdom) John Surtees	Ferrari
- Time: 1:43.4

Podium
First	(United Kingdom) John Surtees	Ferrari
Second	(Italy) Lorenzo Bandini	Ferrari
Third	(United Kingdom) David Hobbs	Lotus-BRM

The 15th Syracuse Grand Prix was a motor race, run to Formula One rules, held on 1 May 1966 at Syracuse Circuit, Sicily. The race was run over 56 laps of the circuit, and was won by British driver John Surtees in a Ferrari 312.

Jack Brabham, Vic Wilson and Denny Hulme all failed to post a time during practice, and lined up on the grid behind the last driver to post a time, André Wicky, whose time was 37.4 seconds slower than Surtees's pole time.

== Results ==
Pos	Driver	Entrant	Constructor	Time/Retired	Grid
1	(United Kingdom) John Surtees	SEFAC Ferrari	Ferrari	1.40:08.3	1
2	(Italy) Lorenzo Bandini	SEFAC Ferrari	Ferrari	+ 24.6 s	2
3	(United Kingdom) David Hobbs	Reg Parnell (Racing)	Lotus-BRM	54 laps	7
4	(United Kingdom) Vic Wilson	Team Chamaco Collect	BRM	53 laps	11
5	(Sweden) Jo Bonnier	Rob Walker Racing Team	Brabham-BRM	52 laps	4
NC	(France) Guy Ligier	Guy Ligier	Cooper-Maserati	39 laps - Ignition	5
Ret	(Australia) Paul Hawkins	Reg Parnell (Racing)	Lotus-Climax		6
Ret	(Switzerland) Jo Siffert	Rob Walker Racing Team	Cooper-Maserati	Driveshaft	3
Ret	(New Zealand) Denny Hulme	Brabham Racing Organisation	Brabham-Climax	Engine	12
Ret	(Australia) Jack Brabham	Brabham Racing Organisation	Brabham-Repco	Engine	10
DNS	(Italy) Giancarlo Baghetti	Anglo-Suisse Racing Team	Lotus-Climax	Gearbox	8
DNS	(Switzerland) André Wicky	André Wicky	Cooper-BRM	Battery	9
DNS	(United Kingdom) Bob Anderson	DW Racing Enterprises	Brabham-Climax	Piston in practice	-
DNA	(Italy) Roberto Bussinello	Alf Francis	Cooper-ATS		-

Previous race: 1966 South African Grand Prix	Formula One non-championship races 1966 season	Next race: 1966 BRDC International Trophy
Previous race: 1965 Syracuse Grand Prix	Syracuse Grand Prix	Next race: 1967 Syracuse Grand Prix
