= 1963 Syracuse Grand Prix =

- Non-championship race in the 1963 Formula One season
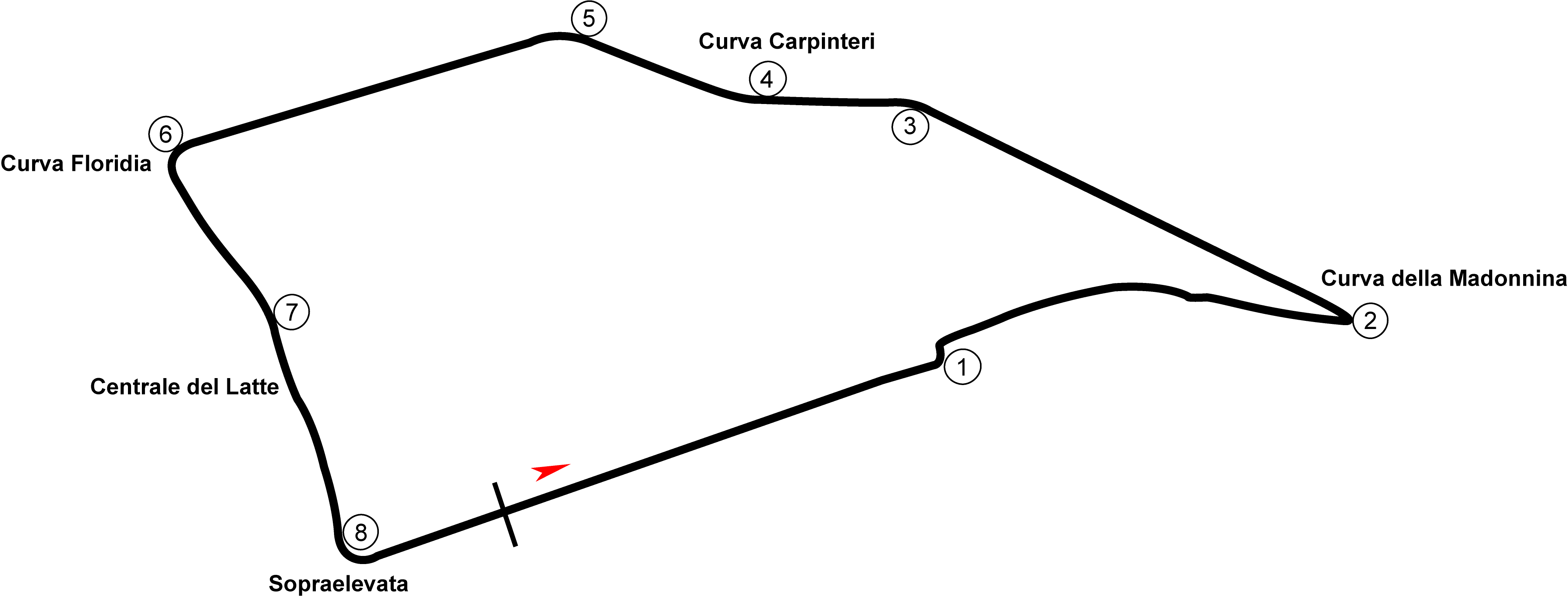

Race details
- Date: 25 April 1963
- Official name: XII Gran Premio di Siracusa
- Location: Syracuse Circuit, Syracuse, Sicily
- Course: Temporary road circuit
- Course length: 5.612 km (3.487 miles)
- Distance: 56 laps, 314.26 km (195.27 miles)

Pole position
Driver	(Switzerland) Jo Siffert	Lotus-BRM
- Time: 1:59.0

Fastest lap
Driver	(Switzerland) Jo Siffert	Lotus-BRM
- Time: 2:00.4

Podium
First	(Switzerland) Jo Siffert	Lotus-BRM
Second	(Netherlands) Carel Godin de Beaufort	Porsche
Third	(Italy) Carlo Abate	Cooper-Maserati

The 12th Syracuse Grand Prix was a motor race, run to Formula One rules, held on 25 April 1963 at Syracuse Circuit, Sicily. The race was run over 56 laps of the circuit, and was won easily by Swiss driver Jo Siffert in a Lotus 24.

== Results ==
Pos	Driver	Entrant	Constructor	Time/Retired	Grid
1	(Switzerland) Jo Siffert	Ecurie Filipinetti	Lotus-BRM	2.06:25.4	1
2	(Netherlands) Carel Godin de Beaufort	Ecurie Maarsbergen	Porsche	+ 1:20.6 s	4
3	(Italy) Carlo Abate	Scuderia Centro Sud	Cooper-Maserati	+ 1 Lap	5
4	(United Kingdom) Bob Anderson	DW Racing Enterprises	Lola-Climax	+ 4 Laps	2
5	(Sweden) Jo Bonnier	Rob Walker Racing Team	Lotus-Climax	+ 7 Laps	3
6	(Italy) Gaetano Starrabba	Gaetano Starrabba	Lotus-Maserati	+ 7 Laps	10
Ret	(Germany) Günther Seiffert	Autosport Team Wolfgang Seidel	Lotus-BRM	Gearbox casing	9
Ret	(France) Bernard Collomb	Bernard Collomb	Lotus-Climax	Front wishbone	7
Ret	(Italy) Lorenzo Bandini	Scuderia Centro Sud	Cooper-Maserati	Oil pipe	6
Ret	(Switzerland) André Wicky	André Wicky	Cooper-Climax	Engine	8
WD	(United States) Phil Hill	Ecurie Filipinetti	Lotus-BRM	Car not ready	-
WD	(United Kingdom) Jim Clark	Team Lotus	Lotus-Climax		-
WD	(United Kingdom) Trevor Taylor	Team Lotus	Lotus-Climax		-
WD	(United Kingdom) John Surtees	SEFAC Ferrari	Ferrari	Car not ready	-
WD	(Argentina) Nasif Estéfano	Scuderia Tomaso	De Tomaso	Car not ready	-

Previous race: 1963 Imola Grand Prix	Formula One non-championship races 1963 season	Next race: 1963 Aintree 200
Previous race: 1961 Syracuse Grand Prix	Syracuse Grand Prix	Next race: 1964 Syracuse Grand Prix
