= 1967 Syracuse Grand Prix =

- Non-championship race in the 1967 Formula One season
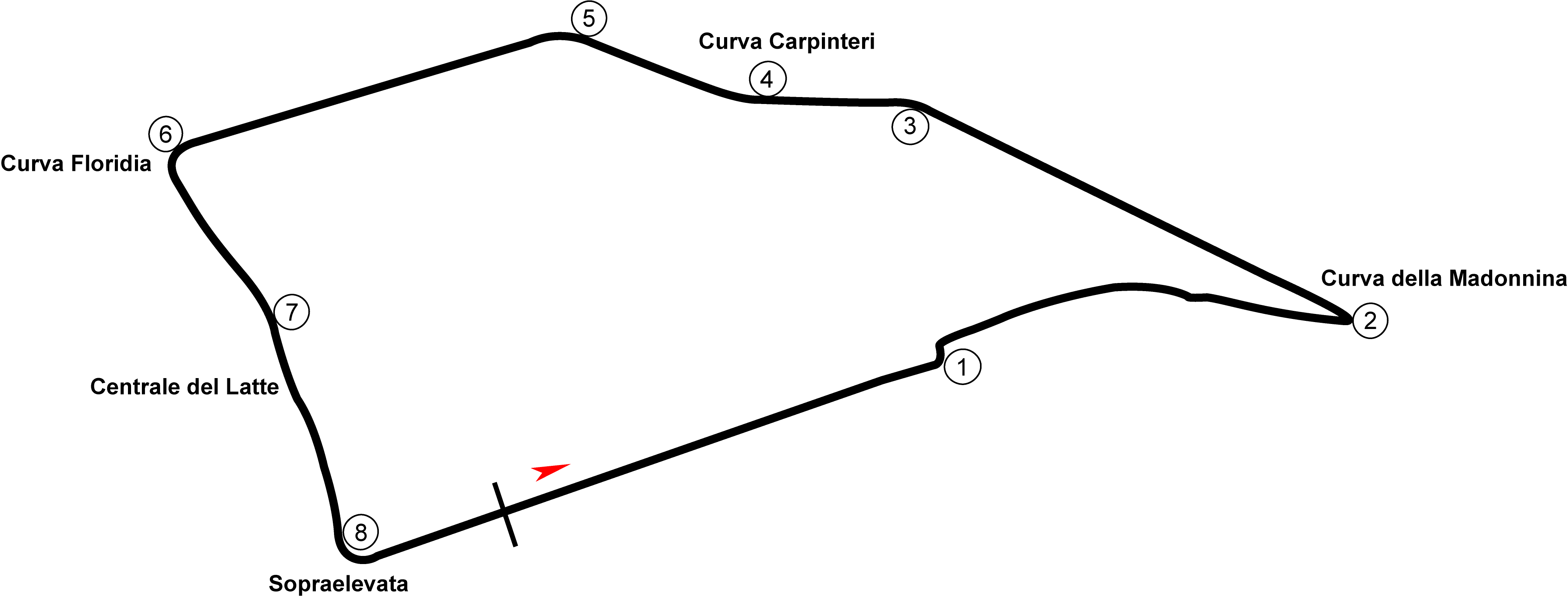

Race details
- Date: 21 May 1967
- Official name: XVI Gran Premio di Siracusa
- Location: Syracuse Circuit, Syracuse, Sicily
- Course: Temporary road circuit
- Course length: 5.598 km (3.478 miles)
- Distance: 56 laps, 313.475 km (194.784 miles)

Pole position
Driver	(United Kingdom) Mike Parkes	Ferrari
- Time: 1:41.6

Fastest lap
Driver	(Italy) Ludovico Scarfiotti	Ferrari
- Time: 1:41.0

Podium
First	(United Kingdom) Mike Parkes; (Italy) Ludovico Scarfiotti	Ferrari; Ferrari
Second	- (Dead heat)	-
Third	(Switzerland) Jo Siffert	Cooper-Maserati

The 16th Syracuse Grand Prix was a motor race, run to Formula One rules, held at Syracuse Circuit, Sicily on 21 May 1967, two weeks after the 1967 Monaco Grand Prix in which Ferrari-driver Lorenzo Bandini suffered burns that led to his death three days later. A week earlier, also on Sicily, the 1967 Targa Florio had taken place, with Sicilian Nino Vaccarella leading in the sole factory V12 Ferrari before crashing out.

Instead of its other current F1 driver, Chris Amon and his current No. 20 car, Ferrari sent its reserve sportscar drivers with two 1966 Ferrari 312s. Ludovico Scarfiotti had chassis #011 with No. 16 and an older V12 engine with white exhaust pipes on each side. Mike Parkes, who was over 190cm tall, had the elongated chassis #012 and the newer spaghetti or snake nest type of exhaust with all 12 white pipes inside the hot V. As No. 18 had been the number of Bandini, it was changed to No. 28.

The event attracted a very small entry of mostly outdated cars, and this was the last Syracuse Grand Prix to be held as a Formula One event. The race was run over 56 laps of the circuit. The two Ferrari team mates, who had finished 2nd behind Bandini/Amon for a Ferrari 1-2-3 at the 1967 24 Hours of Daytona, had dominated the practise, being about 2.5 seconds ahead of Siffert. Spence was another 2 seconds slower. With the other cars at least two laps down, Parkes and Scarfiotti honoured Bandini and finished in an extremely unusual dead heat.

== Results ==
Pos	No.	Driver	Entrant	Car	Time/Retired	Grid
1	28	(United Kingdom) Mike Parkes	SEFAC Ferrari	Ferrari 312	1.40:58.4	1
1	16	(Italy) Ludovico Scarfiotti	SEFAC Ferrari	Ferrari 312	+ 0.0 s	2
3	20	(Switzerland) Jo Siffert	Rob Walker Racing Team	Cooper T81-Maserati	54 laps	3
4	14	(United Kingdom) Chris Irwin	Reg Parnell (Racing)	Lotus 25-BRM	53 laps	7
5	6	(Sweden) Jo Bonnier	Ecurie Bonnier	Cooper T81-Maserati	53 laps	5
Ret	22	(United Kingdom) Mike Spence	Reg Parnell (Racing)	BRM P261	Oil pressure	4
Ret	10	(Switzerland) Silvio Moser	Fritz Baumann	Cooper T77-ATS	Clutch	6
DNS		(France) Jo Schlesser	Ford (France)	F2 Matra MS6-Cosworth FVA	Accident in practice	(8)
WD		(France) Guy Ligier	Guy Ligier	Cooper-Maserati		-
WD		(United Kingdom) Bob Anderson	DW Racing Enterprises	Brabham-Climax		-
WD		(United Kingdom) David Hobbs	Bernard White Racing	BRM		-
WD		(Switzerland) André Wicky	André Wicky	Cooper-Porsche		-

Previous race: 1967 BRDC International Trophy	Formula One non-championship races 1967 season	Next race: 1967 International Gold Cup
Previous race: 1966 Syracuse Grand Prix	Syracuse Grand Prix	Next race: —
