= Luigi Piotti =

Italian racing driver (1913–1971)

- Born: 27 October 1913; Milan, Italy
- Died: 19 April 1971 (aged 57); Godiasco, Italy

Formula One World Championship career
- Nationality: (Italy) Italian
- Active years: 1955–1958
- Team(s): Maserati (inc. as privateer), O.S.C.A
- Entries: 9 (5 starts)
- Championships: 0
- Wins: 0
- Podiums: 0
- Career points: 0
- Pole positions: 0
- Fastest laps: 0
- First entry: 1955 Italian Grand Prix
- Last entry: 1958 Monaco Grand Prix

Luigi Piotti (October 27, 1913 in Milan – April 19, 1971 in Godiasco) was a racing driver from Italy. He participated in nine Formula One World Championship Grands Prix, debuting on January 22, 1956. He scored no championship points.

== Complete Formula One World Championship results ==
(key)

Year	Entrant	Chassis	Engine	1	2	3	4	5	6	7	8	9	10	11	WDC	Pts
1955	Scuderia Volpini	Arzani-Volpini F1	Maserati 4CLT 2.5 L4	ARG	MON	500	BEL	NED	GBR	ITA; DNS					NC	0
1956	Officine Alfieri Maserati	Maserati 250F	Maserati 250F1 2.5 L6	ARG; Ret	MON	500	BEL	FRA	GBR						NC	0
1956	Luigi Piotti	Maserati 250F	Maserati 250F1 2.5 L6							GER; DNS	ITA; 6				NC	0
1957	Luigi Piotti	Maserati 250F	Maserati 250F1 2.5 L6	ARG; 10	MON; DNQ	500	FRA	GBR	GER	PES; Ret	ITA; Ret				NC	0
1958	OSCA Automobili	OSCA F2	OSCA 372 1.5 L4	ARG	MON; DNQ	NED	500	BEL	FRA	GBR	GER	POR	ITA	MOR	NC	0
