= Scuderia Centro Sud =

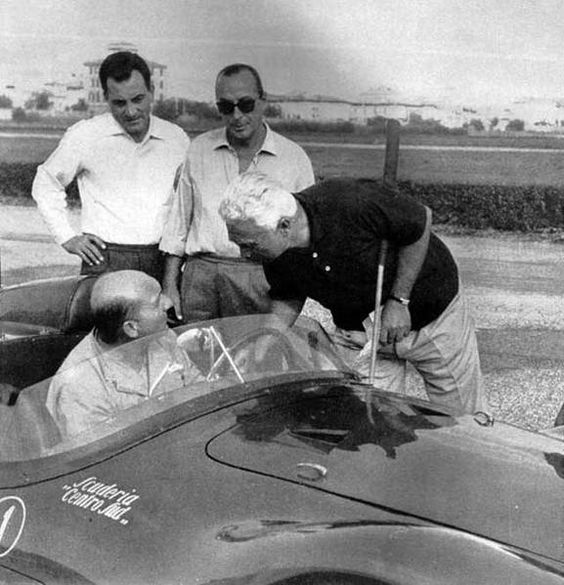
Founder "Mimmo" Dei (center, with sunglasses) surrounded by Guerino Bertocchi (mechanic, seated in Maserati A6GCS/53) and team drivers Giorgio Scarlatti (left) and Piero Taruffi (right).

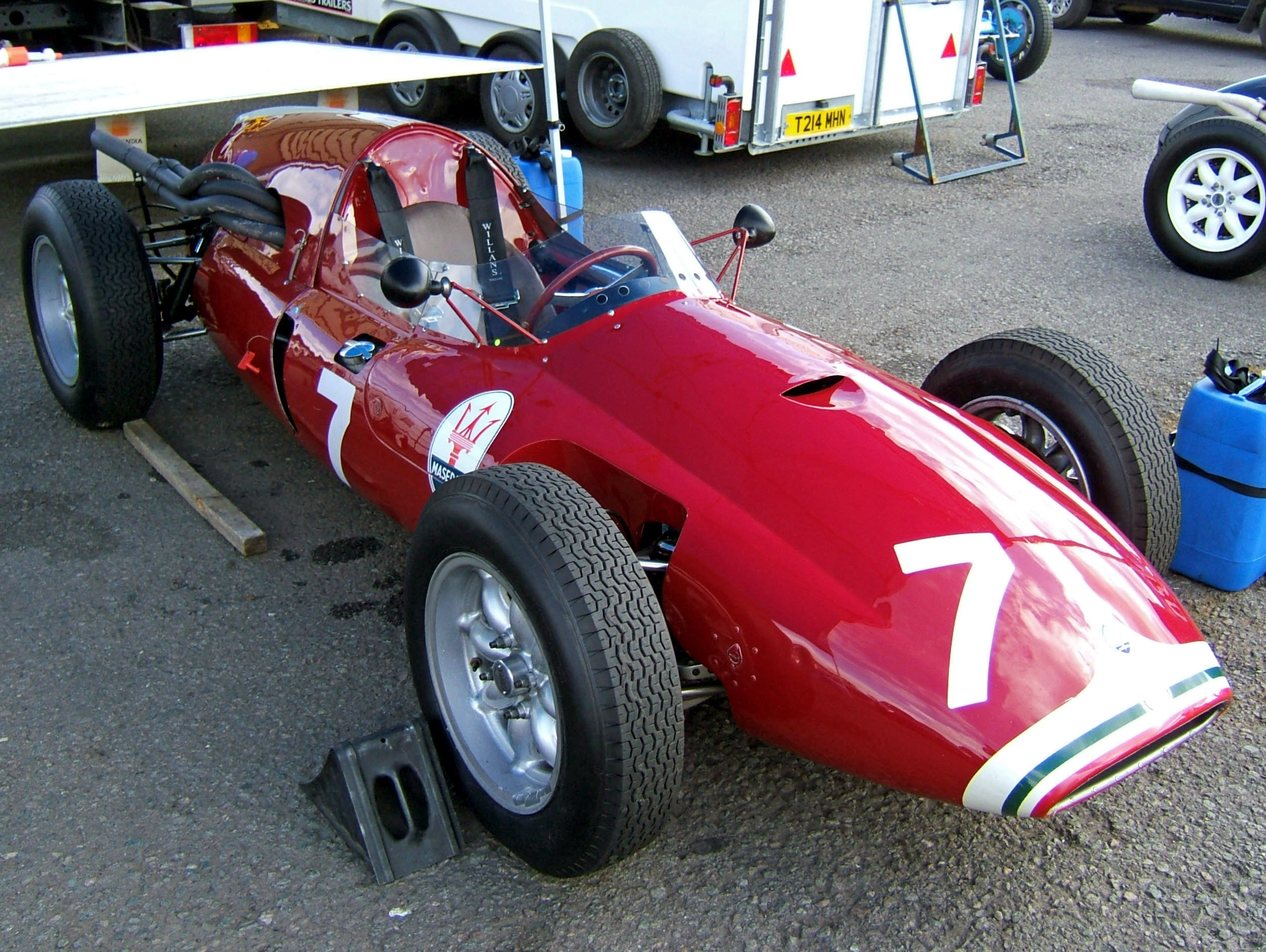
A Cooper-Maserati T51 in Scuderia Centro Sud's rosso corsa livery.

Scuderia Centro Sud was a privateer racing team founded in Modena by Guglielmo "Mimmo" Dei and active in Formula One and sports car racing between 1956 and 1965.

Dei had been an amateur driver in the 1930s. In the early 1950s he opened a Maserati dealership in Rome. Keen on maintaining a relationship with motorsport, in 1956 he founded his own team. The name "Centro Sud" refers to the parts of Italy where his adoptive and native cities are (Modena and Rome).

Over the course of nine seasons, Scuderia Centro Sud entered a total of 49 World Championship rounds, with cars such as the Maserati 250F, various Maserati-powered Coopers and, in the 1960s, a BRM P57. After a very promising start (they scored their first points at their debut with Luigi Villoresi), Centro Sud went on to earn a further total of 24 points, mostly with Masten Gregory and Tony Maggs. But they never won a race: Gregory's third place at the 1957 Monaco Grand Prix was the team's best result.

Centro Sud was the only Italian racing team that took part in the Tasman races in Australia and New Zealand during the winter of 1961-1962.

One of their most notable feats was to be the first team in the history of Formula One to run a female driver, when Maria Teresa de Filippis (who had already raced as a privateer in the 1958 Belgian Grand Prix a few weeks earlier) competed in the 1958 Portuguese Grand Prix as a Centro Sud team driver. Future 1963 24 Hours of Le Mans, and 1967 24 Hours of Daytona winner Lorenzo Bandini made his Formula One debut with the team at the 1961 Belgian Grand Prix.

== Complete Formula One World Championship results ==
(key)

Year	Chassis	Engine(s)	Tyres	Driver	1	2	3	4	5	6	7	8	9	10	11
1956	Maserati 250F	Maserati Straight-6	P		ARG	MON	500	BEL	FRA	GBR	GER	ITA			
1956	Maserati 250F	Maserati Straight-6	P	(Monaco) Louis Chiron		DNS									
1956	Maserati 250F	Maserati Straight-6	P	(Italy) Luigi Villoresi				5							
1956	Maserati 250F	Maserati Straight-6	P	(United States) Harry Schell							Ret				
1956	Maserati 250F	Maserati Straight-6	P	(Switzerland) Toulo de Graffenried								7			
1956	Ferrari 500	Ferrari Straight-4	P	(Italy) Giorgio Scarlatti							Ret				
1957	Maserati 250F	Maserati Straight-6	P		ARG	MON	500	FRA	GBR	GER	PES	ITA			
1957	Maserati 250F	Maserati Straight-6	P	(United States) Harry Schell	4										
1957	Maserati 250F	Maserati Straight-6	P	(Sweden) Joakim Bonnier	7						Ret	Ret			
1957	Maserati 250F	Maserati Straight-6	P	(United States) Masten Gregory		3				8	4	4			
1957	Maserati 250F	Maserati Straight-6	P	(France) André Simon		DNQ									
1957	Maserati 250F	Maserati Straight-6	P	(Germany) Hans Herrmann						Ret					
1957	Ferrari 500	Ferrari Straight-4	P	(Argentina) Alejandro de Tomaso	9										
1958	Maserati 250F	Maserati Straight-6	P		ARG	MON	NED	500	BEL	FRA	GBR	GER	POR	ITA	MOR
1958	Maserati 250F	Maserati Straight-6	P	(Sweden) Joakim Bonnier	DNA							Ret			
1958	Maserati 250F	Maserati Straight-6	P	(Italy) Gerino Gerini		DNQ					9	Ret		Ret	12
1958	Maserati 250F	Maserati Straight-6	P	(France) Maurice Trintignant					7						
1958	Maserati 250F	Maserati Straight-6	P	(United States) Masten Gregory					Ret						
1958	Maserati 250F	Maserati Straight-6	P	(Germany) Wolfgang Seidel					Ret						Ret
1958	Maserati 250F	Maserati Straight-6	P	(United States) Carroll Shelby						Ret	9			Ret*	
1958	Maserati 250F	Maserati Straight-6	P	(United States) Troy Ruttman						10		DNS			
1958	Maserati 250F	Maserati Straight-6	P	(Germany) Hans Herrmann								Ret			
1958	Maserati 250F	Maserati Straight-6	P	(United Kingdom) Cliff Allison									Ret		
1958	Maserati 250F	Maserati Straight-6	P	(Italy) Maria Teresa de Filippis									Ret		
1959	Cooper T51	Maserati Straight-4	D		MON	500	NED	FRA	GBR	GER	POR	ITA	USA		
1959	Cooper T51	Maserati Straight-4	D	(United Kingdom) Ian Burgess				Ret	Ret	6		14			
1959	Cooper T51	Maserati Straight-4	D	(United Kingdom) Colin Davis				Ret				11			
1959	Cooper T51	Maserati Straight-4	D	(Germany) Hans Herrmann					Ret						
1959	Cooper T51	Maserati Straight-4	D	(Portugal) Mário de Araújo Cabral							10				
1959	Maserati 250F	Maserati Straight-6	D	(Uruguay) Asdrúbal Fontes Bayardo				DNQ							
1959	Maserati 250F	Maserati Straight-6	D	(Brazil) Fritz d'Orey				10	Ret						
1960	Cooper T51	Maserati Straight-4	D		ARG	MON	500	NED	BEL	FRA	GBR	POR	ITA	USA	
1960	Cooper T51	Maserati Straight-4	D	(Argentina) Roberto Bonomi	11										
1960	Cooper T51	Maserati Straight-4	D	(Argentina) Carlos Menditeguy	4										
1960	Cooper T51	Maserati Straight-4	D	(United States) Masten Gregory		DNQ		DNS		9	14	Ret			
1960	Cooper T51	Maserati Straight-4	D	(United Kingdom) Ian Burgess		DNQ				10	Ret			Ret	
1960	Cooper T51	Maserati Straight-4	D	(France) Maurice Trintignant		Ret		Ret		Ret				15	
1960	Cooper T51	Maserati Straight-4	D	(Portugal) Mário de Araújo Cabral								Ret			
1960	Cooper T51	Maserati Straight-4	D	(United States) Alfonso Thiele									Ret		
1960	Cooper T51	Maserati Straight-4	D	(Germany) Wolfgang von Trips										9	
1961	Cooper T53	Maserati Straight-4	D		MON	NED	BEL	FRA	GBR	GER	ITA	USA			
1961	Cooper T53	Maserati Straight-4	D	(Italy) Lorenzo Bandini			Ret		12	Ret	8				
1961	Cooper T51	Maserati Straight-4	D	(Italy) Massimo Natili					Ret		DNS				
1963	BRM P57	BRM V8	D		MON	BEL	NED	FRA	GBR	GER	ITA	USA	MEX	RSA	
1963	BRM P57	BRM V8	D	(Italy) Lorenzo Bandini				10	5	Ret					
1963	BRM P57	BRM V8	D	(France) Maurice Trintignant							9				
1963	BRM P57	BRM V8	D	(Mexico) Moisés Solana									11		
1963	Cooper T60	Climax V8	D	(Portugal) Mário de Araújo Cabral						Ret	DNQ				
1963	Cooper T53	Maserati Straight-4	D	(Italy) Ernesto Brambilla							DNQ				
1964	BRM P57	BRM V8	D		MON	NED	BEL	FRA	GBR	GER	AUT	ITA	USA	MEX	
1964	BRM P57	BRM V8	D	(South Africa) Tony Maggs		DNS	DNS		Ret	6	4				
1964	BRM P57	BRM V8	D	(Italy) Giancarlo Baghetti	DNA	10	8		12	Ret	7	8			
1965	BRM P57	BRM V8	D		RSA	MON	BEL	FRA	GBR	NED	GER	ITA	USA	MEX	
1965	BRM P57	BRM V8	D	(Belgium) Lucien Bianchi			12								
1965	BRM P57	BRM V8	D	(United States) Masten Gregory			Ret		12		8	Ret			
1965	BRM P57	BRM V8	D	(Italy) Roberto Bussinello							DNQ	13			
1965	BRM P57	BRM V8	D	(Italy) Giorgio Bassi								Ret			

* After retiring his Scuderia Centro Sud-entered car, Shelby subsequently took over Masten Gregory's car, entered by Temple Buell, finishing fourth.

== Bibliography ==
- Mimmo Dei, Dei ex Machina: La storia della Scuderia Centro-Sud, Milan, Fucina Editore, 2008. (IT)
