= Syracuse Circuit =

Former Italian race track

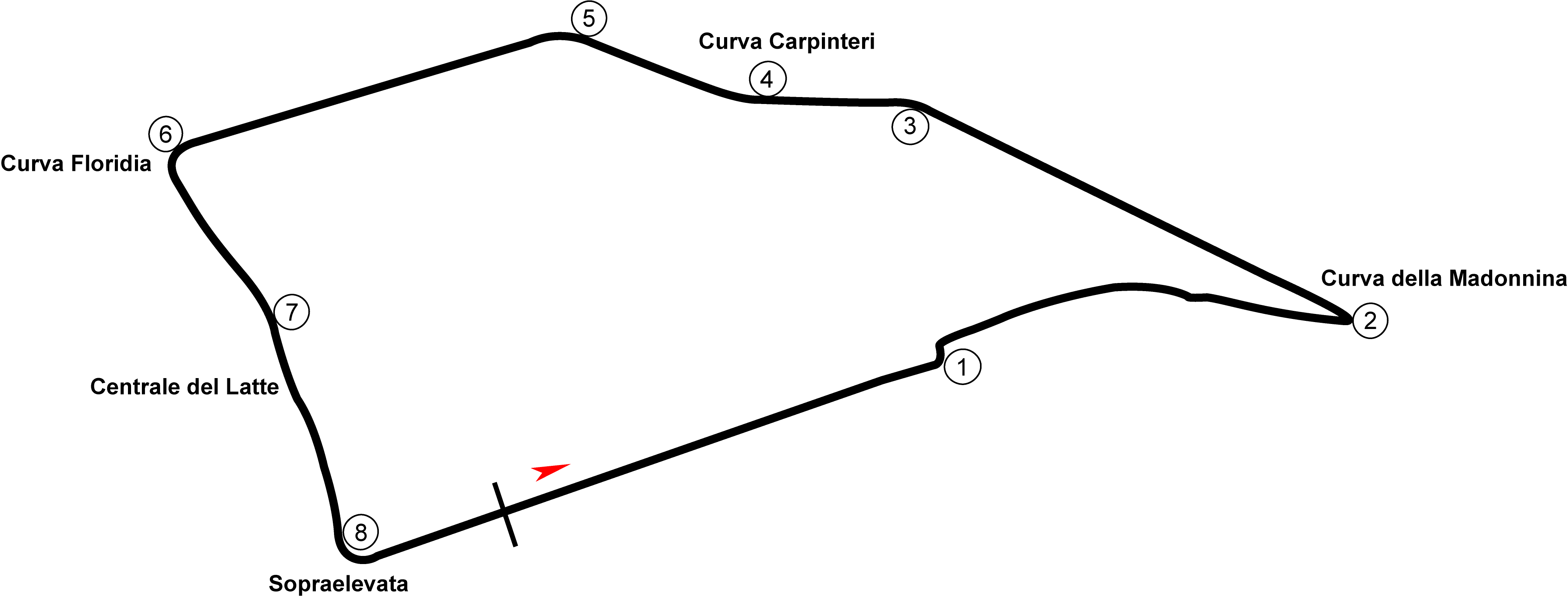
- Grand Prix Circuit (1951–1967)
- Location: Syracuse, Italy
- Coordinates: 37°04′22.39″N 15°15′14.54″E
- Opened: 1950
- Closed: 1969
- Major events: Formula One; Syracuse Grand Prix (1951, 1954–1958, 1961, 1963–1967); Formula Two; Syracuse Grand Prix (1952–1953, 1959–1960)

Grand Prix Circuit (1951–1967)
- Length: 5.598 km (3.478 mi)
- Turns: 11 (8 numbered)
- Race lap record: 1:41.000 ( (Italy) Ludovico Scarfiotti, Ferrari 312, 1967, F1)

Syracuse Circuit, official name: Circuito di Siracusa was a 5.598 kilometres (3.478 mi) race track located in Syracuse, Italy.

From 1951 to 1967, it held the non-championship Syracuse Grand Prix, run to Formula One and Formula Two regulations, with several high-profile drivers winning the event, such as Jim Clark and John Surtees. The track was predominantly made up of local roads.

After closing in 1969 due to safety concerns, the circuit has had several attempts to be revived, with attempts to resume racing in 1983, 2000 and 2025.
