= BARC 200 =

The BARC 200 was an annual motor race organised by the British Automobile Racing Club from 1954 to 1984. it was a revival of the pre-war 200 mile races organised at Brooklands and Donington Park by the BARC's predecessor, the Junior Car Club, and inspired by the construction of the new motor racing circuit at Aintree.

The first event took place on 29 May 1954 as a Formula Libre race and was won by Stirling Moss in a Maserati 250F. Subsequent races at Aintree took place either as a Formula One or mixed Formula One/Formula Two event, with Moss winning on a further three occasions and Jack Brabham winning twice.

Racing at Aintree was scaled back to club-level racing following the 1964 race and, after being scheduled (and twice being cancelled due to the vagaries of British spring weather) variously at Silverstone and Oulton Park, the event moved in 1968 to be a permanent fixture at Thruxton. By now it was a purely Formula Two event, counting as a round of the European Formula Two Championship. Future Formula One World Champion Jochen Rindt won the race four times in succession, leading to a subsequent trophy being awarded in his name.

== Winners of the BARC 200 ==
Year	Date	Formula	Circuit	Driver	Entrant	Constructor	Report
1954	29 May	Formula Libre	Aintree	(United Kingdom) Stirling Moss	Equipe Moss	Maserati 250F	Report
1956	21 April	Formula One	Aintree	(United Kingdom) Stirling Moss	Stirling Moss Ltd.	Maserati 250F	Report
1958	19 April	Formula One/ Formula Two	Aintree	(United Kingdom) Stirling Moss (F1)	Rob Walker Racing	Cooper T45-Climax	Report
1958	19 April	Formula One/ Formula Two	Aintree	(United Kingdom) Tony Brooks (F2)	Rob Walker Racing	Cooper T43-Climax	Report
1959	18 April	Formula One/ Formula Two	Aintree	(France) Jean Behra (F1)	Scuderia Ferrari	Ferrari Dino 246	Report
1959	18 April	Formula One/ Formula Two	Aintree	(United Kingdom) Mike Taylor (F2)	Equipe Alan Brown	Cooper T45-Climax	Report
1960	30 April	Formula Two	Aintree	(United Kingdom) Stirling Moss	R.R.C. Walker Racing Team	Porsche 718/2	Report
1961	22 April	Formula One	Aintree	(Australia) Jack Brabham	Cooper Car Company	Cooper T55-Climax	Report
1962	28 April	Formula One	Aintree	(United Kingdom) Jim Clark	Team Lotus	Lotus 24-Climax	Report
1963	27 April	Formula One	Aintree	(United Kingdom) Graham Hill	Owen Racing Organisation	BRM P57	Report
1964	18 April	Formula One/ Formula Two	Aintree	(Australia) Jack Brabham (F1)	Brabham Racing Organisation	Brabham BT7-Climax	Report
1964	18 April	Formula One/ Formula Two	Aintree	(United Kingdom) Mike Spence (F2)	Ron Harris Team Lotus	Lotus 32-Cosworth	Report
1965	20 March	Formula Two	Silverstone	Race cancelled - waterlogged track			
1966	2 April	Formula Two	Oulton Park	Race cancelled - snow on track			
1967	27 March	Formula Two	Silverstone	(Austria) Jochen Rindt	Roy Winkelmann Racing	Brabham BT23-Cosworth	Report
1968	15 April	Formula Two	Thruxton	(Austria) Jochen Rindt	Roy Winkelmann Racing	Brabham BT23C-Cosworth	Report
1969	7 April	Formula Two	Thruxton	(Austria) Jochen Rindt	Roy Winkelmann Racing	Lotus 59B-Cosworth	Report
1970	30 March	Formula Two	Thruxton	(Austria) Jochen Rindt	Jochen Rindt Racing	Lotus 69-Cosworth	Report
1971	12 April	Formula Two	Thruxton	(United Kingdom) Graham Hill	Rondel Racing	Brabham BT36-Cosworth	Report
1972	3 April	Formula Two	Thruxton	(Sweden) Ronnie Peterson	STP March Engineering	March 722-Cosworth	Report
1973	23 April	Formula Two	Thruxton	(France) Henri Pescarolo	Motel Rondel Racing	Motul M1-Cosworth	Report
1974	15 April	Formula Two	Thruxton	Race cancelled			
1975	31 March	Formula Two	Thruxton	(France) Jacques Laffite	Écurie Elf Ambrozium	Martini Mk 16-BMW	Report
1976	19 April	Formula Two	Thruxton	(Italy) Maurizio Flammini	March Cars Ltd./BMW Motorsport	March 762-BMW	Report
1977	11 April	Formula Two	Thruxton	(United Kingdom) Brian Henton	Netherton & Worth Boxer Cars	Boxer PR276-Hart	Report
1978	27 March	Formula Two	Thruxton	(Italy) Bruno Giacomelli	Polifac BMW Junior Team	March 782-BMW	Report
1979	16 April	Formula Two	Thruxton	(South Africa) Rad Dougall	Toleman Group Motorsport	March 782-Hart	Report
1980	7 April	Formula Two	Thruxton	(United Kingdom) Brian Henton	Toleman Group Motorsport	Toleman TG280-Hart	Report
1981	20 April	Formula Two	Thruxton	(Colombia) Roberto Guerrero	Maurer Motorsport	Maurer MM81-BMW	Report
1982	12 April	Formula Two	Thruxton	(Venezuela) Johnny Cecotto	March Racing Ltd.	March 822-BMW	Report
1983	4 April	Formula Two	Thruxton	(Italy) Beppe Gabbiani	Onyx Race Engineering	March 832-BMW	Report
1984	23 April	Formula Two	Thruxton	(United Kingdom) Mike Thackwell	Ralt Racing Ltd.	Ralt RH6-Mugen/Honda	Report
