= 1956 BARC Aintree 200 =

1956 Aintree 200
- Non-championship race in the 1956 Formula One season
- Aintree Circuit

Race details
- Date: 21 April 1956
- Official name: XI BARC Aintree 200
- Location: Aintree Circuit, United Kingdom
- Course: Permanent racing facility
- Course length: 4.828 km (2.999 miles)
- Distance: 67 laps, 323.409 km (200.957 miles)

Pole position
Driver	(United Kingdom) Archie Scott-Brown	Connaught-Alta
- Time: 2:03.8

Fastest lap
Driver	(United Kingdom) Tony Brooks	BRM
- Time: 2:04.69

Podium
First	(United Kingdom) Stirling Moss	Maserati
Second	(United Kingdom) Tony Brooks	BRM
Third	(Australia) Jack Brabham	Maserati

The 1956 Aintree 200 was a non-championship Formula One race held on 21 April 1956. The race was won by Stirling Moss, in a privately entered Maserati 250F.

== Entry list ==
No	Driver	Entrant	Car	Engine
1	(United Kingdom) Mike Hawthorn	Owen Racing Organisation	BRM 25	BRM
2	(United Kingdom) Tony Brooks	Owen Racing Organisation	BRM 25	BRM
3	(United Kingdom) Archie Scott-Brown	Connaught Engineering	Connaught B	Alta
4	(United Kingdom) Desmond Titterington	Connaught Engineering	Connaught B	Alta
7	(United Kingdom) Stirling Moss	Stirling Moss Ltd	Maserati 250F	Maserati
8	(United Kingdom) Reg Parnell	R.R.C Walker Racing Team	Connaught B	Alta
9	(Australia) Jack Brabham	Jack Brabham	Maserati 250F	Maserati
10	(United Kingdom) Roy Salvadori	Gilby Engineering	Maserati 250F	Maserati
12	(United Kingdom) Bruce Halford	Bruce Halford	Maserati 250F	Maserati
14	(France) Louis Rosier	Ecurie Rosier	Maserati 250F	Maserati
17	(United Kingdom) Bob Gerard	Bob Gerard	Cooper 23	Bristol
18	(United Kingdom) John Young	John Young	Connaught A	Lea Francis
19	(United Kingdom) Dick Gibson	Dick Gibson	Connaught A	Lea Francis

== Results ==
=== Qualifying ===
Pos	No	Driver	Constructor	Time	Gap
1	3	(United Kingdom) Archie Scott-Brown	Connaught-Alta	2:03.8	-
2	1	(United Kingdom) Mike Hawthorn	BRM	2:06.0	+2.2
3	4	(United Kingdom) Desmond Titterington	Connaught-Alta	2:06.2	+2.4
4	7	(United Kingdom) Stirling Moss	Maserati	2:06.6	+2.8
5	10	(United Kingdom) Roy Salvadori	Maserati	2:06.6	+2.8
6	2	(United Kingdom) Tony Brooks	BRM	2:06.6	+2.8
7	14	(France) Louis Rosier	Maserati	2:11.8	+8.0
8	8	(United Kingdom) Reg Parnell	Connaught-Alta	2:12.4	+8.6
9	18	(United Kingdom) John Young	Connaught-Lea Francis	2:15.2	+11.4
10	9	(Australia) Jack Brabham	Maserati	2:18.2	+14.4
11	17	(United Kingdom) Bob Gerard	Cooper-Bristol	2:24.4	+20.6
12	12	(United Kingdom) Bruce Halford	Maserati	2:27.2	+23.4
13	19	(United Kingdom) Dick Gibson	Connaught-Lea Francis	2:28.2	+24.4

=== Race ===
Pos	No	Driver	Constructor	Laps	Time/Retired
1	7	(United Kingdom) Stirling Moss	Maserati	67	2:23'06.4
2	2	(United Kingdom) Tony Brooks	BRM	66	+1 Laps
3	9	(Australia) Jack Brabham	Maserati	64	+3 Laps
4	14	(France) Louis Rosier	Maserati	62	+5 Laps
5	19	(United Kingdom) Dick Gibson (United Kingdom) Bob Berry	Connaught-Lea Francis	59	+8 Laps
Ret	4	(United Kingdom) Desmond Titterington	Connaught-Alta	53	Brakes
Ret	12	(United Kingdom) Bruce Halford	Maserati	39	Accident
Ret	17	(United Kingdom) Bob Gerard	Cooper-Bristol	35	Engine
Ret	18	(United Kingdom) John Young	Connaught-Lea Francis	30	Gearbox
Ret	3	(United Kingdom) Archie Scott-Brown	Connaught-Alta	13	Piston
Ret	10	(United Kingdom) Roy Salvadori	Maserati	5	Bearings
Ret	8	(United Kingdom) Reg Parnell	Connaught-Alta	5	Overheating
Ret	1	(United Kingdom) Mike Hawthorn	BRM	4	Brakes

Previous race: 1956 Syracuse Grand Prix	Formula One non-championship races 1956 season	Next race: 1956 BRDC International Trophy
Previous race: 1954 BARC Aintree 200	Aintree 200	Next race: 1958 BARC Aintree 200
