= 1961 Aintree 200 =

Motor race at Aintree Circuit, England

- Non-championship race in the 1961 Formula One season

Race details
- Date: 22 April 1961
- Official name: VI Aintree 200
- Location: Aintree Circuit, Merseyside
- Course: Permanent racing facility
- Course length: 4.828 km (3 miles)
- Distance: 50 laps, 241.4 km (150 miles)
- Weather: Wet

Pole position
Driver	(United Kingdom) Graham Hill	BRM-Climax
- Time: 2:00.2

Fastest lap
Driver	(Australia) Jack Brabham	Cooper-Climax
- Time: 2:15.0

Podium
First	(Australia) Jack Brabham	Cooper-Climax
Second	(New Zealand) Bruce McLaren	Cooper-Climax
Third	(United Kingdom) Graham Hill	BRM-Climax

The 6th Aintree 200 was a Formula One motor race held on 22 April 1961 at Aintree Circuit, Merseyside. The race was run over 50 laps of the circuit, and was won by Australian driver Jack Brabham in a Cooper T55-Climax, setting fastest lap in the process. Teammate Bruce McLaren was second and Graham Hill, starting from pole position, was third in a BRM-Climax.

== Results ==
Pos	Driver	Entrant	Constructor	Time/Retired	Grid
1	(Australia) Jack Brabham	Cooper Car Company	Cooper-Climax	1.55:17.2	2
2	(New Zealand) Bruce McLaren	Cooper Car Company	Cooper-Climax	+ 28.4 s	3
3	(United Kingdom) Graham Hill	Owen Racing Organisation	BRM-Climax	+ 1:09.8 s	1
4	(United Kingdom) John Surtees	Yeoman Credit Racing Team	Cooper-Climax	+ 1:58.2 s	4
5	(United States) Masten Gregory	Camoradi International	Cooper-Climax	49 laps	26
6	(United Kingdom) Jack Lewis	H & L Motors	Cooper-Climax	49 laps	6
7	(United Kingdom) Tony Marsh	Tony Marsh	Lotus-Climax	49 laps	8
8	(United Kingdom) Roy Salvadori	Yeoman Credit Racing Team	Cooper-Climax	48 laps	9
9	(United Kingdom) Jim Clark	Team Lotus	Lotus-Climax	48 laps	5
10	(United Kingdom) Innes Ireland	Team Lotus	Lotus-Climax	48 laps	7
11	(United Kingdom) Gerry Ashmore	Tim Parnell	Lotus-Climax	48 laps	12
12	(United Kingdom) Shane Summers	Terry Bartram	Cooper-Climax	47 laps	13
13	(United Kingdom) Keith Greene	Gilby Engineering	Gilby-Climax	47 laps	27
14	(United States) Dan Gurney	Louise Bryden-Brown	Lotus-Climax	47 laps	15
15	(United Kingdom) Cliff Allison	UDT-Laystall Racing Team	Lotus-Climax	46 laps	11
16	(Belgium) André Pilette	Emeryson Cars	Emeryson-Climax	45 laps	22
17	(United Kingdom) Tony Brooks	Owen Racing Organisation	BRM-Climax	44 laps	10
18	(United Kingdom) Graham Eden	Graham Eden	Cooper-Climax	43 laps	19
19	(United Kingdom) Trevor Taylor	Team Lotus	Lotus-Climax	41 laps	14
DSQ	(United Kingdom) Ian Burgess	Camoradi International	Lotus-Climax	Took on extra oil	25
Ret	(United Kingdom) Henry Taylor	UDT-Laystall Racing Team	Lotus-Climax	Gearbox	17
Ret	(France) Bernard Collomb	Bernard Collomb	Cooper-Climax	Engine	20
Ret	(United Kingdom) Peter Procter	Anthony Brooke	Lotus-Climax	Ignition	24
Ret	(United Kingdom) Tim Parnell	Tim Parnell	Lotus-Climax	Engine	28
Ret	(Switzerland) Michael May	Scuderia Colonia	Lotus-Climax	Engine	21
Ret	(United Kingdom) Stirling Moss	Rob Walker Racing Team	Cooper-Climax	Engine	23
Ret	(United Kingdom) George Morgan	Tommy Atkins	Cooper-Climax	Accident	16
Ret	(Belgium) Lucien Bianchi	Equipe Nationale Belge	Emeryson-Maserati	Accident	18
WD	(United States) Lloyd Casner	Camoradi International	Lotus-Climax	No car	-
WD	(United Kingdom) Brian Naylor	JBW Car Co	JBW-Maserati	Car not ready	-
WD	(Germany) Wolfgang Seidel	Scuderia Colonia	Lotus-Climax	No car	-
WD	(Belgium) Willy Mairesse	Equipe Nationale Belge	Emeryson-Maserati	No car	-
WD	(United Kingdom) John Campbell-Jones	John Campbell-Jones	Cooper-Climax		-

Previous race: 1961 Vienna Grand Prix	Formula One non-championship races 1961 season	Next race: 1961 Syracuse Grand Prix
Previous race: 1959 BARC "200"	Aintree 200	Next race: 1962 Aintree 200
