= 1962 Aintree 200 =

- Non-championship race in the 1962 Formula One season

Race details
- Date: 28 April 1962
- Official name: VII Aintree 200
- Location: Aintree Circuit, Merseyside
- Course: Permanent racing facility
- Course length: 4.828 km (3 miles)
- Distance: 50 laps, 241.4 km (150 miles)

Pole position
Driver	(United Kingdom) Jim Clark	Lotus-Climax
- Time: 1:53.8

Fastest lap
Driver	(United Kingdom) Jim Clark	Lotus-Climax
- Time: 1:54.0

Podium
First	(United Kingdom) Jim Clark	Lotus-Climax
Second	(New Zealand) Bruce McLaren	Cooper-Climax
Third	(United States) Phil Hill	Ferrari

The 7th Aintree 200 was a Formula One motor race held on 28 April 1962 at Aintree Circuit, Merseyside. The race was run over 50 laps of the circuit, and was won by British driver Jim Clark in a Lotus 24-Climax. Clark also set pole position and fastest lap. Bruce McLaren in a Cooper-Climax was second and Ferrari driver Phil Hill was third.

== Results ==
Pos	Driver	Entrant	Constructor	Time/Retired	Grid
1	(United Kingdom) Jim Clark	Team Lotus	Lotus-Climax	1.37.08.2	1
2	(New Zealand) Bruce McLaren	Cooper Car Company	Cooper-Climax	+ 30.2 s	6
3	(United States) Phil Hill	SEFAC Ferrari	Ferrari	+ 34.2 s	8
4	(Italy) Giancarlo Baghetti	SEFAC Ferrari	Ferrari	+ 35.0 s	9
5	(United Kingdom) Trevor Taylor	Team Lotus	Lotus-Climax	49 laps	20
6	(United Kingdom) John Campbell-Jones	Emeryson Cars	Emeryson-Climax	48 laps	11
7	(New Zealand) Tony Shelly	John Dalton	Lotus-Climax	48 laps	13
8	(United States) Tony Settember	Emeryson Cars	Emeryson-Climax	48 laps	19
9	(United Kingdom) Tim Parnell	Tim Parnell	Lotus-Climax	46 laps	16
10	(United Kingdom) Keith Greene	Gilby Engineering	Gilby-Climax	40 laps	12
11	(United Kingdom) David Piper	Speed Sport	Lotus-Climax	38 laps	17
12	(Germany) Günther Seiffert	Autosport Team Wolfgang Seidel	Lotus-Climax	37 laps	22
13	(United Kingdom) Ian Burgess	Anglo-American Equipe	Cooper Special-Climax	24 laps	21
Ret	(United Kingdom) Graham Hill	Owen Racing Organisation	BRM	Piston	2
Ret	(United Kingdom) John Surtees	Bowmaker Racing Team	Lola-Climax	Valve gear	3
Ret	(United States) Masten Gregory	UDT-Laystall Racing Team	Lotus-Climax	Valve	7
Ret	(United Kingdom) Innes Ireland	UDT-Laystall Racing Team	Lotus-Climax	Valve	5
Ret	(United States) Richie Ginther	Owen Racing Organisation	BRM	Gearbox	4
Ret	(Germany) Wolfgang Seidel	Autosport Team Wolfgang Seidel	Porsche	Differential	14
Ret	(United Kingdom) Roy Salvadori	Bowmaker Racing Team	Lola-Climax	Throttle linkage	15
Ret	(United Kingdom) Tony Marsh	Owen Racing Organisation	BRM	Oil leak	10
Ret	(Australia) Jack Brabham	Brabham Racing Organisation	Lotus-Climax	Gearbox	23
DSQ	(United States) Jay Chamberlain	Jay Chamberlain	Lotus-Climax	Push-start	18
WD	(United Kingdom) Stirling Moss	UDT-Laystall Racing Team	Lotus-Climax	Driver injured	-
WD	(United Kingdom) Jack Lewis	Ecurie Galloise	BRM	Car not ready	-
WD	(New Zealand) Ross Greenville	Ross Greenville	Cooper-Climax		-

Previous race: 1962 Pau Grand Prix	Formula One non-championship races 1962 season	Next race: 1962 BRDC International Trophy
Previous race: 1961 Aintree 200	Aintree 200	Next race: 1963 Aintree 200
