= 1964 Aintree 200 =

- Non-championship race in the 1964 Formula One season

Race details
- Date: 18 April 1964
- Official name: IX Aintree 200
- Location: Aintree Circuit, Merseyside
- Course: Permanent racing facility
- Course length: 4.828 km (3 miles)
- Distance: 67 laps, 323.476 km (201 miles)

Pole position
Driver	(United Kingdom) Graham Hill	BRM
- Time: 1:53.8

Fastest lap
Driver	(United Kingdom) Jim Clark	Lotus-Climax
- Time: 1:52.2

Podium
First	(Australia) Jack Brabham-Climax	Brabham
Second	(United Kingdom) Graham Hill	BRM
Third	(United Kingdom) Peter Arundell	Lotus-Climax

The 9th Aintree 200 was a Formula One motor race held on 18 April 1964 at Aintree Circuit, Merseyside. The race was run over 67 laps of the circuit, and was won by Australian driver Jack Brabham in a Brabham BT7-Climax. BRM driver Graham Hill started from pole position and finished second, and Lotus driver Peter Arundell was third. Arundell's teammate Jim Clark set fastest lap.

During most of the race, Brabham duelled for the lead with Clark, but the Australian won easily after Clark was obstructed by André Pilette and crashed on lap 47.

There was also a class for Formula Two cars in this race, which was won by Lotus driver Mike Spence after the two cars in front of him retired on the last lap; Brian Hart suffering a driveshaft failure and Alan Rees running out of fuel.

This was the last occasion on which the BARC 200 was held at Aintree, and the last occasion on which it was run as a Formula One race.

== Results ==
Note: a blue background indicates a Formula Two entrant.

Pos	Driver	Entrant	Constructor	Time/Retired	Grid
1	(Australia) Jack Brabham	Brabham Racing Organisation	Brabham-Climax	2.09:02.6	2
2	(United Kingdom) Graham Hill	Owen Racing Organisation	BRM	+ 34.0	1
3	(United Kingdom) Peter Arundell	Team Lotus	Lotus-Climax	+ 1:31.0	3
4	(Sweden) Jo Bonnier	Rob Walker Racing Team	Cooper-Climax	66 laps	8
5	(United Kingdom) John Taylor	Gerard Racing	Cooper-Ford	65 laps	12
6	(United Kingdom) Mike Spence	Ron Harris / Team Lotus	Lotus-Cosworth	64 laps	18
7	(South Africa) Tony Maggs	Midland Racing Partnership	Lola-Cosworth	64 laps	20
8	(United Kingdom) Richard Attwood	Midland Racing Partnership	Lola-Cosworth	64 laps	16
9	(Italy) Giancarlo Baghetti	Scuderia Centro Sud	BRM	63 laps	14
10	(New Zealand) Denny Hulme	Brabham Racing Developments	Brabham-Cosworth	63 laps	11
11	(Belgium) André Pilette	Equipe Scirocco Belge	Scirocco-Climax	61 laps	25
12	(United Kingdom) Brian Hart	Cosworth Engineering	Lotus-Cosworth	Halfshaft	15
13	(United Kingdom) Alan Rees	Roy Winkelmann Racing	Brabham-Cosworth	Out of fuel	19
14	(United Kingdom) John Fenning	Ron Harris / Team Lotus	Lotus-Ford	60 laps	23
15	(United Kingdom) Ian Raby	Ian Raby (Racing)	Brabham-BRM	55 laps	22
Ret	(United Kingdom) Jim Clark	Team Lotus	Lotus-Climax	Accident	4
Ret	(United Kingdom) Innes Ireland	British Racing Partnership	BRP-BRM	Rear wishbone	7
Ret	(United Kingdom) Tony Hegbourne	Normand Ltd.	Cooper-Cosworth	Engine	17
Ret	(United States) Dan Gurney	Brabham Racing Organisation	Brabham-Climax	Transmission	21
Ret	(United Kingdom) Mike Hailwood	Reg Parnell Racing	Lotus-BRM	Engine	13
Ret	(United Kingdom) David Hobbs	Merlyn Racing	Merlyn-Cosworth	Overheating	24
Ret	(United Kingdom) Trevor Taylor	British Racing Partnership	BRP-BRM	Piston rings	9
Ret	(New Zealand) Bruce McLaren	Cooper Car Company	Cooper-Climax	Overheating	5
Ret	(United States) Phil Hill	Cooper Car Company	Cooper-Climax	Gearbox	10
Ret	(New Zealand) Chris Amon	Reg Parnell Racing	Lotus-BRM	Fuel feed	27
DNS	(United States) Richie Ginther	Owen Racing Organisation	BRM	Practice accident	(6)
DNS	(Portugal) Mário Cabral	Mario Cabral	Cooper-Climax	Gearbox	(26)
WD	(United Kingdom) John Surtees	SEFAC Ferrari	Ferrari		-
WD	(United States) Peter Revson	Revson Racing (America)	Lotus-BRM	Car not ready	-
WD	(United Kingdom) Bob Anderson	DW Racing Enterprises	Brabham-Climax	Car not delivered	-
WD	(Switzerland) Jo Siffert	Siffert Racing Team	Lotus-BRM	Driver injured	-
WD	(United Kingdom) Mike Beckwith	Normand Ltd.	Cooper-Cosworth	Gearbox	-

Previous race: 1964 Syracuse Grand Prix	Formula One non-championship races 1964 season	Next race: 1964 BRDC International Trophy
Previous race: 1963 Aintree 200	Aintree 200	Next race: —
