= T58 =

T58 may refer to:

== Aviation ==
- General Electric T58, an American turboshaft engine
- Slingsby T.58, a British replica aircraft
- Sukhoi T-58, a Soviet prototype interceptor aircraft

== Other uses ==
- Cooper T58, a Formula One racing car
- T58-class minesweeper, of the Soviet Navy
