= 1963 Aintree 200 =

- Non-championship race in the 1963 Formula One season

Race details
- Date: 27 April 1963
- Official name: VIII Aintree 200
- Location: Aintree Circuit, Merseyside
- Course: Permanent racing facility
- Course length: 4.828 km (3 miles)
- Distance: 50 laps, 241.4 km (150 miles)

Pole position
| Driver | (United Kingdom) Jim Clark | Lotus-Climax |
- Time: 1:53.8

Fastest lap
| Driver | (United Kingdom) Jim Clark | Lotus-Climax |
- Time: 1:51.8

Podium
| First | (United Kingdom) Graham Hill | BRM |
| Second | (United Kingdom) Innes Ireland | Lotus-BRM |
| Third | (United Kingdom) Trevor Taylor (United Kingdom) Jim Clark | Lotus-Climax |

The 8th Aintree 200 was a motor race, run to Formula One rules, held on 27 April 1963 at Aintree Circuit, England. The race was run over 50 laps of the circuit, and was won by British driver Graham Hill in a BRM P57.

== Characteristics ==
This race saw one of the last instances of car changing in Formula One, as it was already illegal in World Championship races. Jim Clark's Lotus 25 was left on the starting line with a flat battery and joined the race a lap down, but after 16 laps, he swapped cars with his team-mate Trevor Taylor who was in fifth place at the time. Clark moved up to finish third, while Taylor was left in seventh place. Clark set the fastest lap of the race in Taylor's car.

Jack Brabham qualified in second place but failed to start after suffering a broken piston in practice.

== Results ==
| Pos | Driver | Entrant | Constructor | Time/Retired | Grid |
|---|---|---|---|---|---|
| 1 | (United Kingdom) Graham Hill | Owen Racing Organisation | BRM | 1:35.20.8 | 4 |
| 2 | (United Kingdom) Innes Ireland | British Racing Partnership | Lotus-BRM | + 15.0 s | 3 |
| 3 | (United Kingdom) Trevor Taylor (United Kingdom) Jim Clark | Team Lotus | Lotus-Climax | + 28.6 s | 6 |
| 4 | (United States) Richie Ginther | Owen Racing Organisation | BRM | + 31.8 s | 5 |
| 5 | (New Zealand) Bruce McLaren | Cooper Car Company | Cooper-Climax | + 1:12.4 s | 7 |
| 6 | (New Zealand) Chris Amon | Reg Parnell (Racing) | Lola-Climax | 48 laps | 10 |
| 7 | (United Kingdom) Jim Clark (United Kingdom) Trevor Taylor | Team Lotus | Lotus-Climax | 47 laps | 1 |
| 8 | (United Kingdom) Jimmy Blumer | Reg Parnell (Racing) | Lotus-Climax | 47 laps | 14 |
| 9 | (United Kingdom) John Taylor | Gerard Racing | Cooper-Ford | 42 laps | 11 |
| Ret | (United Kingdom) Ian Raby | Ian Raby (Racing) | Gilby-BRM | Engine | 9 |
| Ret | (United Kingdom) John Campbell-Jones | Tim Parnell | Lotus-BRM | Oil leak | 13 |
| DSQ | (United Kingdom) Tim Parnell | Tim Parnell | Lotus-Climax | Push-start | 17 |
| Ret | (United Kingdom) Jock Russell | Jock Russell | Lotus-Climax | Rear suspension | 15 |
| Ret | (South Africa) Tony Maggs | Cooper Car Company | Cooper-Climax | Brakes / Ignition | 18 |
| Ret | (United Kingdom) Philip Robinson | A. Robinson & Sons | Lotus-Climax | Engine | 12 |
| Ret | (United States) Jim Hall | British Racing Partnership | Lotus-BRM | Throttle linkage | 8 |
| DNS | (Australia) Jack Brabham | Brabham Racing Organisation | Brabham-Climax | Piston | (2) |
| DNS | (Belgium) André Pilette | André Pilette | Lotus-Climax | Withdrew after practice | (16) |
| WD | (United Kingdom) Morris Nunn | Morris Nunn | Cooper-Climax | Car not ready | - |

- Wolfgang Seidel entered two cars under the Autosport Team Wolfgang Seidel banner, but these were withdrawn before the event.

| Previous race: 1963 Syracuse Grand Prix | Formula One non-championship races 1963 season | Next race: 1963 BRDC International Trophy |
| Previous race: 1962 Aintree 200 | Aintree 200 | Next race: 1964 Aintree 200 |
