= Cooper T55 =

Formula One race car

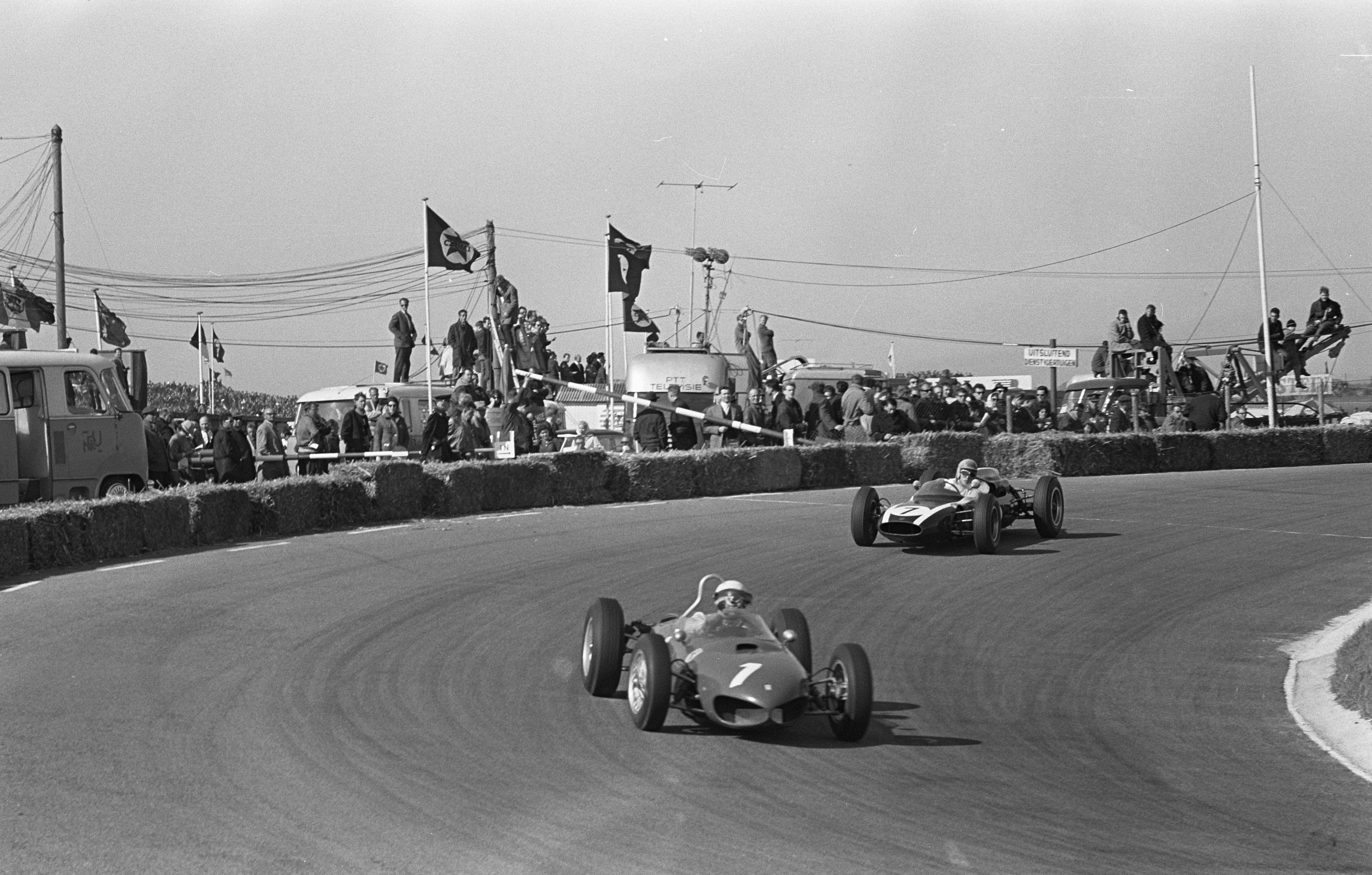
- Tony Maggs' T55 pursues Phil Hill's Ferrari at the 1962 Dutch Grand Prix
- Category: Formula One
- Constructor: Cooper Car Company
- Designer: Owen Maddock
- Predecessor: Cooper T53
- Successor: Cooper T58

Technical specifications
- Chassis: Steel spaceframe
- Suspension (front): Double wishbone, coil spring and damper
- Suspension (rear): Double wishbone, coil spring and damper
- Axle track: F: 1,190 mm (47 in); R: 1,220 mm (48 in)
- Wheelbase: 2,310 mm (91 in)
- Engine: Coventry Climax FPF 1.5-litre straight-4, naturally aspirated, rear mid, longitudinally mounted.
- Transmission: Cooper 6-speed manual gearbox.
- Weight: 500 kg (1,100 lb)
- Tyres: Dunlop

Competition history
- Notable entrants: Cooper Car Company
- Notable drivers: (Australia) Jack Brabham (New Zealand) Bruce McLaren (South Africa) Tony Maggs (Rhodesia) John Love
- Debut: 1961 Monaco Grand Prix
Races	Podiums
14	1

The Cooper-Climax T55 is a Formula One car built by the Cooper Car Company for the 1961 Formula One season. Its best result was third-place for Bruce McLaren at the 1961 Italian Grand Prix.

== Development ==
The T55 was a stop-gap development of the Cooper T53 for the start of the 1961 Formula One season, pending the introduction of a new chassis to take the Climax FWMV V8 for the new 1.5 litre formula. Smaller and lighter than the T53, it was powered by the 170 hp (130 kW) naturally aspirated Coventry-Climax FPF four-cylinder engine driving through a new Cooper six-speed gearbox.

== Racing history ==
The T55 debuted at the non-championship 1961 Aintree 200. Jack Brabham and Bruce McLaren finished first and second, and Brabham set fastest lap. However, it would be unable to match the power of the new Ferrari 156 in the World Championship events, where McLaren's third place at Monza would be its best result. Cooper would finish fourth in the Constructors' championship.

The works team continued with the T55 at the start of 1962, along with the V8-powered T60, primarily driven by Brabham's replacement Tony Maggs, although McLaren used it in some non-championship events. John Love then obtained one of the cars and campaigned with it in several South African events, including its last World Championship appearance at the 1965 South African Grand Prix.

== Complete Formula One World Championship results ==
Year	Entrants	Engine	Tyres	Drivers	1	2	3	4	5	6	7	8	9	10	Points^{1}	WCC
1961	Cooper Car Company	Climax FPF; 1.5 in-line 4	D		MON	NED	BEL	FRA	GBR	GER	ITA	USA			14 (18)^{2}	4th
1961	Cooper Car Company	Climax FPF; 1.5 in-line 4	D	Jack Brabham	Ret	6	Ret	Ret	4						14 (18)^{2}	4th
1961	Cooper Car Company	Climax FPF; 1.5 in-line 4	D	Bruce McLaren	6	12	Ret	5	8	6	3	4			14 (18)^{2}	4th
1962	Cooper Car Company	Climax FPF; 1.5 in-line 4	D		NED	MON	BEL	FRA	GBR	GER	ITA	USA	RSA		29 (37)^{2}	3rd
1962	Cooper Car Company	Climax FPF; 1.5 in-line 4	D	Tony Maggs	6	Ret				9					29 (37)^{2}	3rd
1962	John Love	Climax FPF; 1.5 in-line 4	D	John Love									8		29 (37)^{2}	3rd
1963	John Love	Climax FPF; 1.5 in-line 4	D		MON	BEL	NED	FRA	GBR	GER	ITA	USA	MEX	RSA	25 (26)^{3}	5th
1963	John Love	Climax FPF; 1.5 in-line 4	D	John Love										9	25 (26)^{3}	5th
1965	John Love	Climax FPF; 1.5 in-line 4	D		RSA	MON	BEL	FRA	GBR	NED	GER	ITA	USA	MEX	14^{3}	5th
1965	John Love	Climax FPF; 1.5 in-line 4	D	John Love	Ret										14^{3}	5th

^{1} Points were awarded on an 8-6-4-3-2-1 (1961) and 9-6-4-3-2-1 (1962 onwards) basis to the first six finishers at each round, but only the best placed car for each make was eligible to score points. In 1961 and 1962 only the best five results from the season were retained, and only the best six results for 1963 and 1965.
^{2} Includes points scored by other Cooper-Climax models
^{3} All points scored by other Cooper-Climax models
