= Jack Brabham =

Australian racing driver and motorsport executive (1926–2014)

Sir Jack Brabham AO OBE
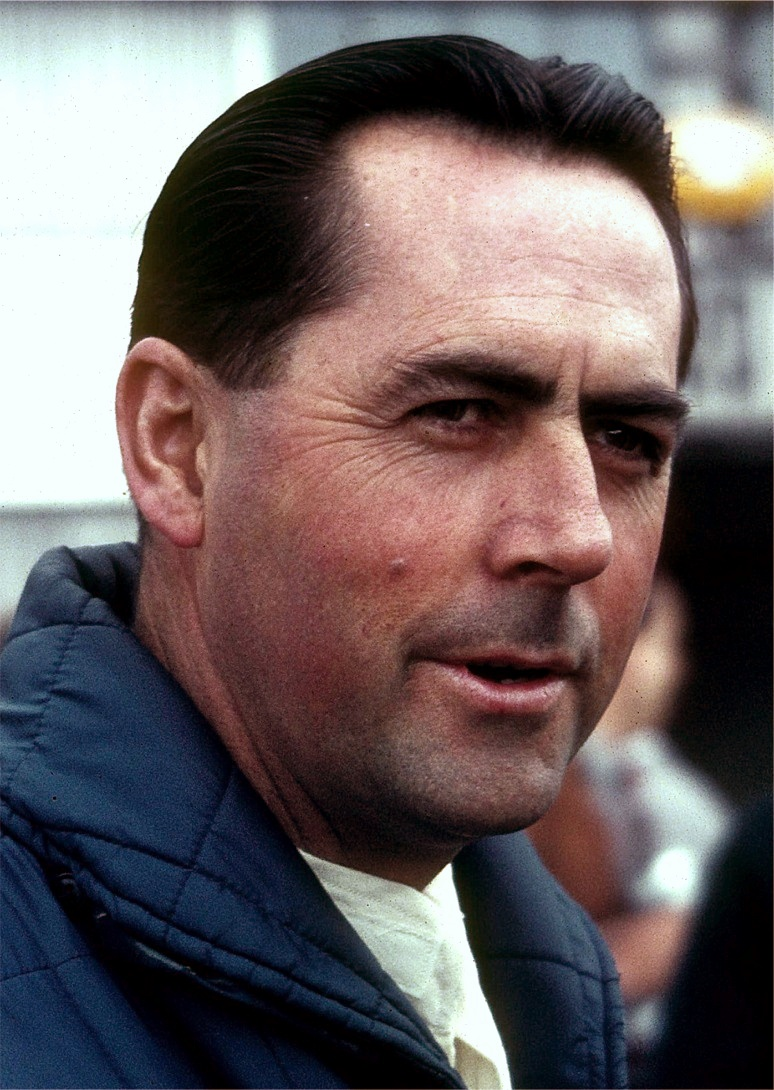
- Brabham in 1966
- Born: John Arthur Brabham; 2 April 1926; Hurstville, New South Wales, Australia
- Died: 19 May 2014 (aged 88); Gold Coast, Queensland, Australia
- Spouses: Betty Beresford (m. 1951; div. 1994) Margaret Taylor (m. 1995)
- Children: Geoff; Gary; David
- Relatives: Matthew Brabham (grandson); Sam Brabham (grandson)

Formula One World Championship career
- Nationality: (Australia) Australian
- Active years: 1955–1970
- Team(s): Cooper, privateer Maserati, Walker, Brabham
- Entries: 128 (126 starts)
- Championships: 3 (1959, 1960, 1966)
- Wins: 14
- Podiums: 31
- Career points: 253 (261) (Note: Up until 1990, not all points scored by a driver contributed to their final World Championship tally (see list of points scoring systems for more information). Numbers without parentheses are Championship points; numbers in parentheses are total points scored.)
- Pole positions: 13
- Fastest laps: 12
- First entry: 1955 British Grand Prix
- First win: 1959 Monaco Grand Prix
- Last win: 1970 South African Grand Prix
- Last entry: 1970 Mexican Grand Prix

Sir John Arthur Brabham (2 April 1926 – 19 May 2014) was an Australian racing driver and motorsport executive, who competed in Formula One from 1955 to 1970. Brabham won three Formula One World Drivers' Championship titles, in 1959, 1960 and 1966, and 14 Grands Prix across 16 seasons. He co-founded Brabham in 1960, leading the team to two World Constructors' Championship titles, and remains the only driver to have won the World Drivers' Championship in an eponymous car.

Brabham was a Royal Australian Air Force flight mechanic and ran a small engineering workshop before he started racing midget cars in 1948. His successes with midgets in Australian and New Zealand road racing events led to his going to Britain to further his racing career. There he became part of the Cooper Car Company's racing team, building as well as racing cars. He contributed to the design of the mid-engined cars that Cooper introduced to Formula One and the Indianapolis 500, and won the Formula One world championship in 1959 and 1960. In 1962 he established his own Brabham marque with fellow Australian Ron Tauranac, which in the 1960s became the largest manufacturer of custom racing cars in the world. In the 1966 Formula One season Brabham became the only man to win the Formula One world championship driving one of his own cars. At the time of his death, he was the last surviving World Champion of the 1950s.

After the 1970 Formula One season, Brabham retired to Australia, where he bought a farm and maintained business interests, which included the Engine Developments racing engine manufacturer and several garages.

== Early life ==
John Arthur 'Jack' Brabham was born on 2 April 1926 in Hurstville, New South Wales, then a commuter town outside Sydney. Brabham was involved with cars and mechanics from an early age. At the age of 12, he learned to drive the family car and the trucks of his father's grocery business. Brabham attended technical college, studying metalwork, carpentry, and technical drawing.

Brabham's early career continued the engineering theme. At the age of 15, he left school to work, combining a job at a local garage with an evening course in mechanical engineering. Brabham soon branched out into his own business selling motorbikes, which he bought and repaired for sale, using his parents' back veranda as his workshop.

One month after his 18th birthday on 19 May 1944, Brabham enlisted into the Royal Australian Air Force (RAAF). Although he was keen on becoming a pilot, there was already a surplus of trained aircrew and the Air Force instead put his mechanical skills to use as a flight mechanic, of which there was a wartime shortage. He was based at RAAF Station Williamtown, where he maintained Bristol Beaufighters at No. 5 Operational Training Unit. On his 20th birthday, 2 April 1946, Brabham was discharged from the RAAF with the rank of leading aircraftman. He then started a small service, repair, and machining business in a workshop built by his uncle on a plot of land behind his grandfather's house.

== Racing career ==
=== Australia ===
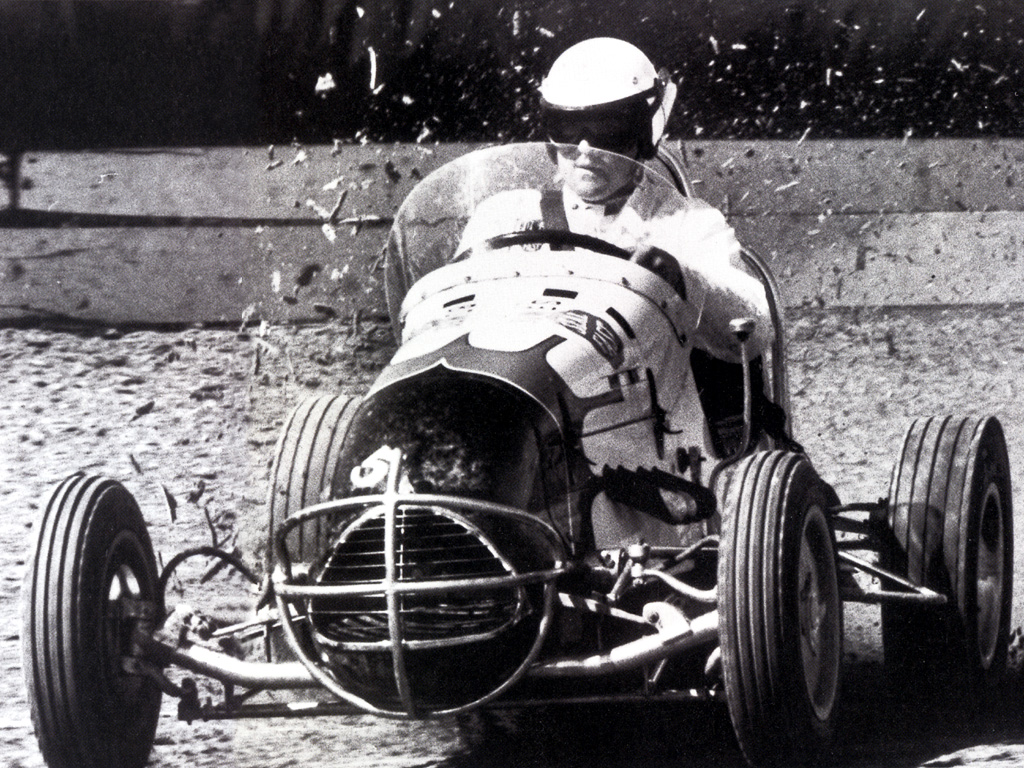
A midget car similar to those driven by Brabham

Brabham started racing after an American friend, Johnny Schonberg, persuaded him to watch a midget car race. Midget racing was a category for small open-wheel cars racing on dirt ovals. It was popular in Australia, attracting crowds of up to 40,000. Brabham records that he was not taken with the idea of driving, being convinced that the drivers "were all lunatics" but he agreed to build a car with Schonberg.

At first, Schonberg drove the homemade device, powered by a modified JAP motorcycle engine built by Brabham in his workshop. In 1948, Schonberg's wife persuaded him to stop racing and on his suggestion Brabham took over. He almost immediately found that he had a knack for the sport, winning on his third night's racing. From there he was a regular competitor and winner in Midgets (known as Speedcars in Australia) at tracks such Sydney's Cumberland Speedway, the Sydney Showground, and the Sydney Sports Ground, as well as interstate tracks such as Adelaide's Kilburn and Rowley Park speedways and the Ekka in Brisbane. Brabham has since said that it was "terrific driver training. You had to have quick reflexes: in effect you lived—or possibly died—on them." Due to the time required to prepare the car, the sport also became his living. Brabham won the 1948 Australian Speedcar Championship, the 1949 Australian and South Australian Speedcar championships, and the 1950–1951 Australian championship with the car.

After successfully running the midget at some hillclimbing events in 1951, Brabham became interested in road racing. He bought and modified a series of racing cars from the Cooper Car Company, a British constructor, and from 1953 concentrated on this form of racing, in which drivers compete on closed tarmac circuits. He was supported by his father and by the Redex fuel additive company, although his commercially aware approach—including the title RedeX Special painted on the side of his Cooper-Bristol—did not go down well with the Confederation of Australian Motor Sport (CAMS), which banned the advertisement. Brabham competed in Australia and New Zealand until early 1955, taking "a long succession of victories", including the 1953 Queensland Road Racing championship. During this time, he picked up the nickname "Black Jack", which has been variously attributed to his dark hair and stubble, to his "ruthless" approach on the track, and to his "propensity for maintaining a shadowy silence". After the 1954 New Zealand Grand Prix, Brabham was persuaded by Dean Delamont, competitions manager of the Royal Automobile Club in the United Kingdom, to try a season of racing in Europe, then the international centre of road racing.

=== Europe ===
==== Cooper ====
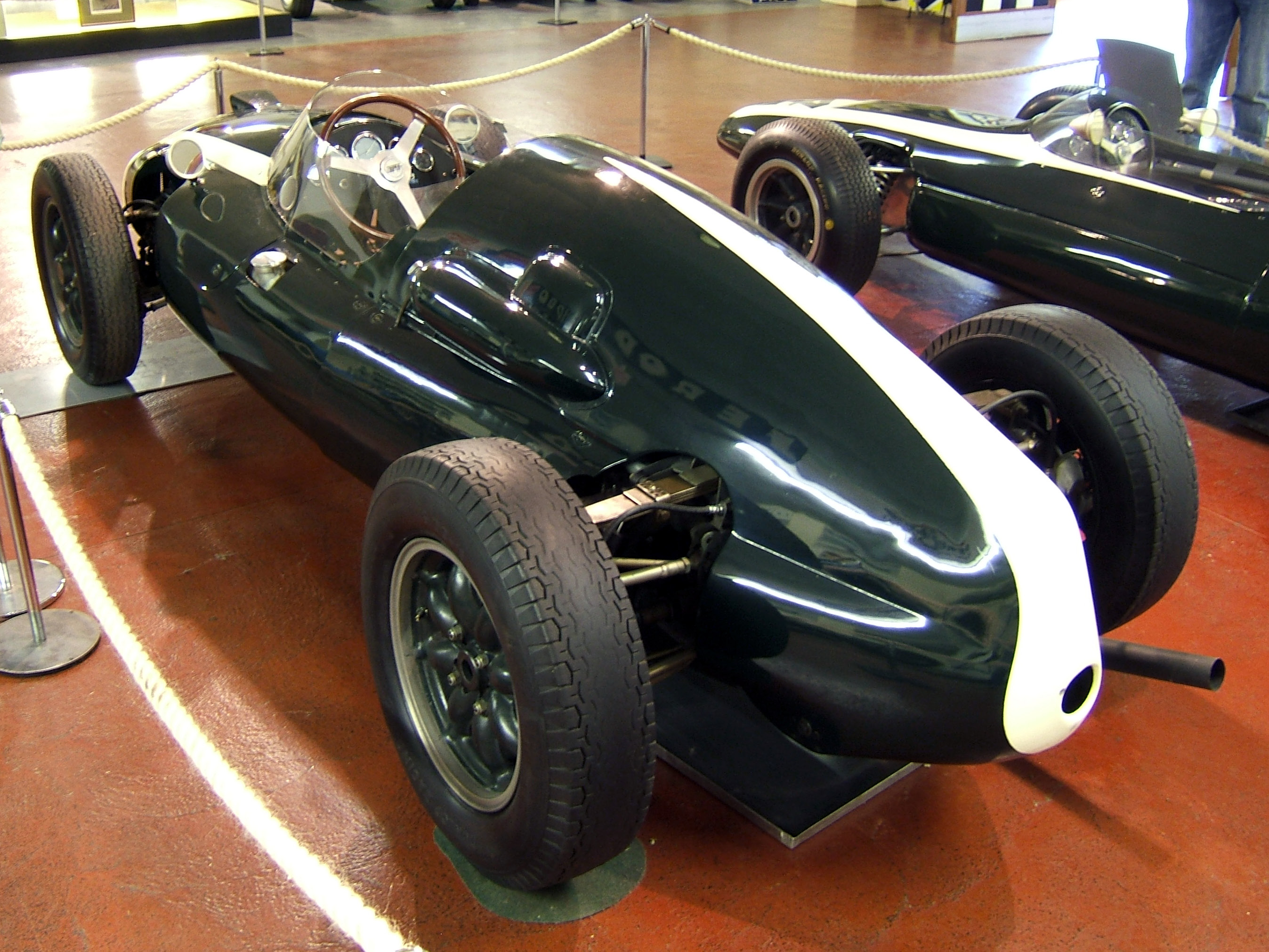
A rear-engined T51 of the type Brabham used to win his first world championship

Upon arriving in Europe on his own in early 1955, Brabham based himself in the UK, where he bought another Cooper to race in national events. His crowd-pleasing driving style initially betrayed his dirt track origins: as he put it, he took corners "by using full [steering] lock and lots of throttle". Visits to the Cooper factory for parts led to a friendship with Charlie and John Cooper, who told the story that after many requests for a drive with the factory team, Brabham was given the keys to the transporter taking the cars to a race. Brabham soon "seemed to merge into Cooper Cars": he was not an employee, but he started working at Cooper daily from the midpoint of the 1955 season building a modified Bobtail mid-engined sports car, powered by a Bristol engine, intended for Formula One, the top category of single seater racing. (Note: Formula One rules did not at that time prevent the use of cars with enclosed wheels.) He made his Grand Prix debut at the age of 29 driving the car at the 1955 British Grand Prix. It had a 2-litre engine, half a litre less than permitted, and ran slowly with a broken clutch before retiring. Later in the year Brabham, again driving the Bobtail, tussled with Stirling Moss for third place in a non-championship Formula One race at Snetterton. Although Moss finished ahead, Brabham saw the race as a turning point, proving that he could compete at this level. He shipped the Bobtail back to Australia, where he used it to win the 1955 Australian Grand Prix before selling it to help fund a permanent move to the UK the following year with his wife Betty and their son Geoff.

Brabham briefly and unsuccessfully campaigned his own second hand Formula One Maserati 250F during 1956, but his season was saved by drives for Cooper in sports cars and Formula Two, the junior category to Formula One. At that time, almost all racing cars had their engines mounted at the front but Coopers were different, having the engine placed behind the driver, which improved their handling. In 1957, Brabham drove another mid-engined Cooper, again only fitted with a 2-litre engine, at the Monaco Grand Prix. He avoided a large crash at the first corner and was running third towards the end of the race when the fuel pump mount failed. After more than three hours of racing, the exhausted Brabham, who "hated to be beaten", pushed the car to the line to finish sixth. The following year, he was Autocar Formula Two champion in a Cooper, while continuing to score minor points-scoring positions with the small-engined Coopers in the World Drivers' Championship and driving for Aston Martin in Sportscars. His schedule necessitated a considerable amount of travel on the roads of Europe. Brabham's driving on public roads was described as "safe as houses", unlike many of his contemporaries—on the way back from the 1957 Pescara Grand Prix, passenger Tony Brooks took over driving after Brabham refused to overtake a long line of lorries. In late 1958, Brabham rekindled his interest in flying and began taking lessons. He bought his own plane and on gaining his licence began to make heavy use of it piloting himself, his family, and members of his team around Europe to races.

In 1959, Cooper obtained 2.5-litre engines for the first time and Brabham put the extra power to good use by winning his first world championship race at the season-opening Monaco Grand Prix after Jean Behra's Ferrari and Stirling Moss's Cooper failed. More podium places were followed by a win in the British Grand Prix at Aintree after Brabham preserved his tyres to the end of the race, enabling him to finish ahead of Moss who had to pit to replace worn tyres. This gave him a 13-point championship lead with four races to go. At the Portuguese Grand Prix at Monsanto Park, Brabham was chasing race leader Moss when a backmarker moved over on him and launched the Cooper into the air. The airborne car hit a telegraph pole, throwing Brabham onto the track, where he narrowly avoided being hit by one of his teammates but escaped with no serious injury. With two wins each, Brabham, Moss, and Ferrari's Tony Brooks were all capable of winning the championship at the final event of the season, the United States Grand Prix at Sebring. Brabham was among those up until 1 am the morning before the race working on the Cooper team cars. The next day, after pacing himself behind Moss, who soon retired with a broken gearbox, he led almost to the end of the race before running out of fuel on the last lap. He again pushed the car to the finish line to place fourth, although in the event this was unnecessary as his other title rival, Brooks, finished only third. His championship-winning margin over Brooks was four points. According to Gerald Donaldson, "some thought [his title] owed more to stealth than skill, an opinion at least partly based on Brabham's low-key presence."

Despite his success with Cooper, Brabham was sure he could do better. He considered buying Cooper in partnership with Roy Salvadori and then in late 1959 he asked his friend Ron Tauranac to come to the UK and work with him, producing upgrade kits for Sunbeam Rapier and Triumph Herald road cars at his car dealership, Jack Brabham Motors, but with the long-term aim of designing racing cars. Brabham continued to drive for Cooper, but on the long flight back from the 1960 season-opening Argentine Grand Prix, he had a heart-to-heart with John Cooper. John's father Charlie and the designer Owen Maddock had been reluctant to update their car, but although a Cooper had won in Argentina, other cars had been faster before they broke down. Brabham helped design the more advanced Cooper T53, including advice from Tauranac. Brabham spun the new car out of the next championship race, the Monaco Grand Prix, but then embarked on a series of five straight victories. He won from the front at the Dutch, French, and Belgian Grands Prix, where title rival Moss was badly injured in a practice accident that put him out for two months. Two other drivers were killed during the race. At the British Grand Prix, Brabham was closing on Graham Hill's BRM before Hill spun off, leaving Brabham the victory. He then came back from eighth place to second at the Portuguese Grand Prix after sliding off on tramlines and won after race leader John Surtees crashed. Brabham's points total was put out of reach when the British teams withdrew from the Italian GP on safety grounds. Mike Lawrence writes that Brabham's expertise in setting up the cars was a significant factor in Cooper's 1960 drivers' and constructors' titles.

Coventry Climax were late in producing the smaller 1.5-litre engine required for the 1961 season and the Cooper-Climaxes were outclassed by new mid-engined cars from Porsche, Lotus, and championship-winners Ferrari. Brabham scored only three points and finished 11th in the championship. He had a little more success in the non-championship Formula One races, where he ran his own private Coopers and took three victories at Snetterton (26 March), Brussels (9 April), and Aintree (22 April).

The same year, Brabham entered the famous Indianapolis 500 oval race for the first time in a modified version of the Formula One Cooper. It had a 2.7-litre Climax engine producing 268 bhp (200 kW; 272 PS) compared to the 4.4-litre, 430 bhp (321 kW; 436 PS) Offenhauser engines used by the front-engined roadsters driven by all the other entrants. Jack qualified a respectable 17th at 145.144 mp/h (pole winner Eddie Sachs qualified at 147.481 mp/h), and while the front-engined roadsters were much faster on the long front and back straights, the rear-engined Cooper's superior handling through the turns and the shorter north and south sections kept the reigning World Champion competitive. Brabham ran as high as third before finishing ninth, completing all 200 laps. Although most of the doubters in the American Indycar scene claimed that rear-engine cars were for drivers who like to be pushed around, as Brabham put it, it "triggered the rear-engined revolution at Indy" and within five years most of the cars that raced at Indianapolis would be rear-engined.

==== Brabham ====
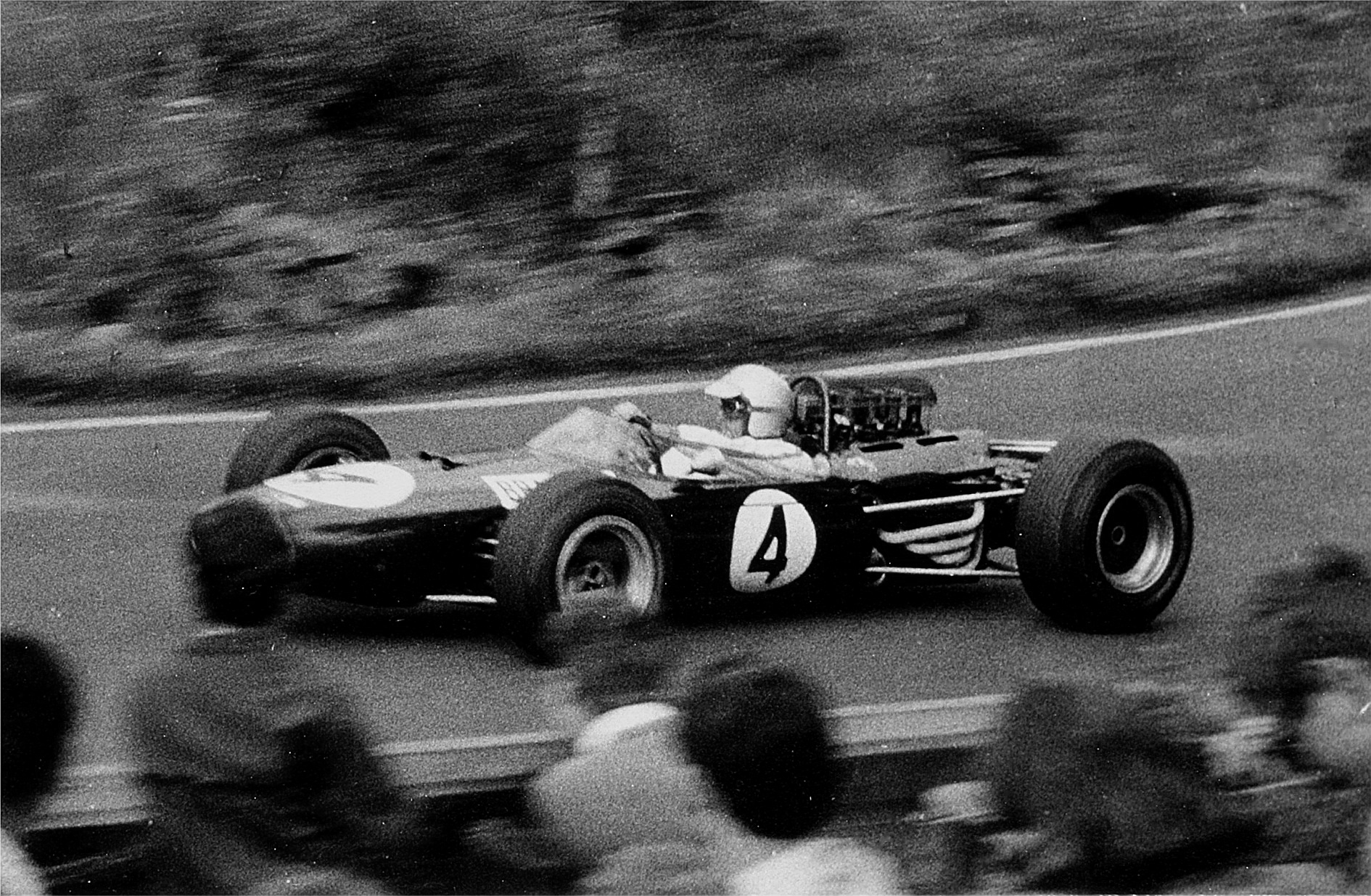
Brabham at the 1965 German Grand Prix at the Nürburgring.

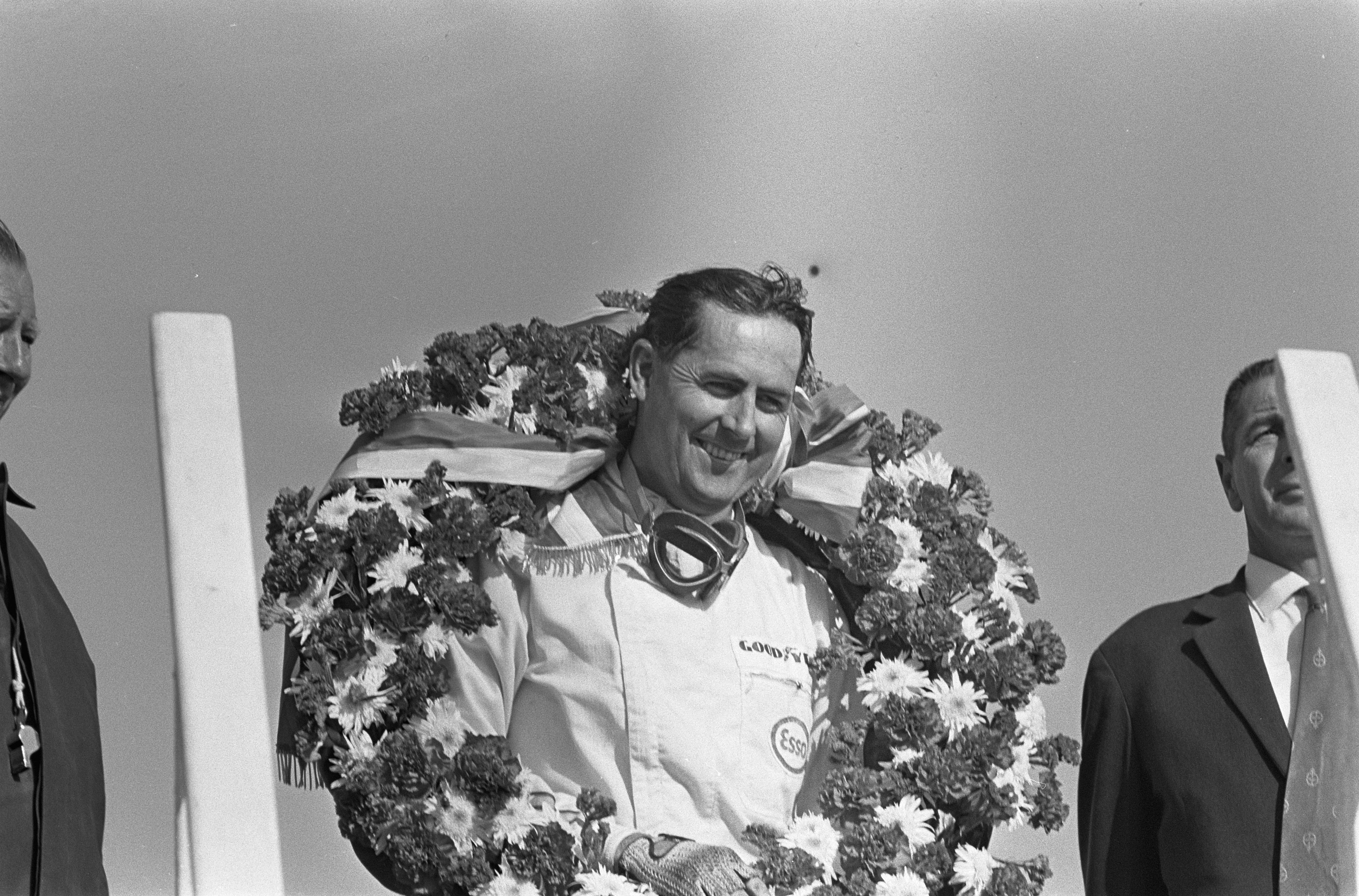
Brabham after winning the 1966 Dutch Grand Prix at Zandvoort.

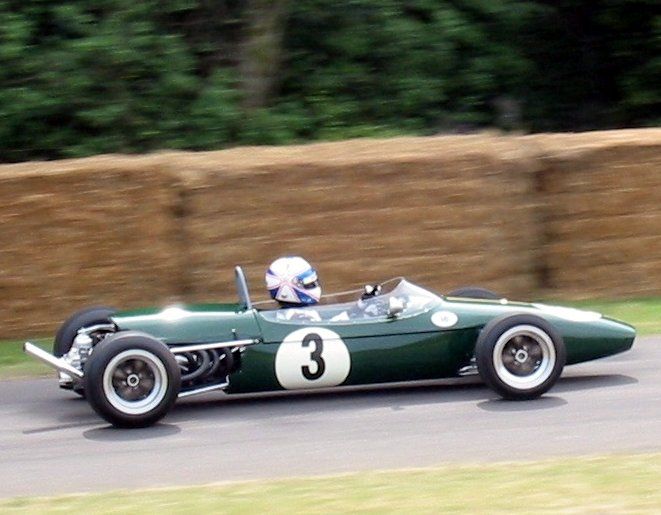
Brabham BT18-Honda of the type with which Jack Brabham dominated Formula Two in 1966

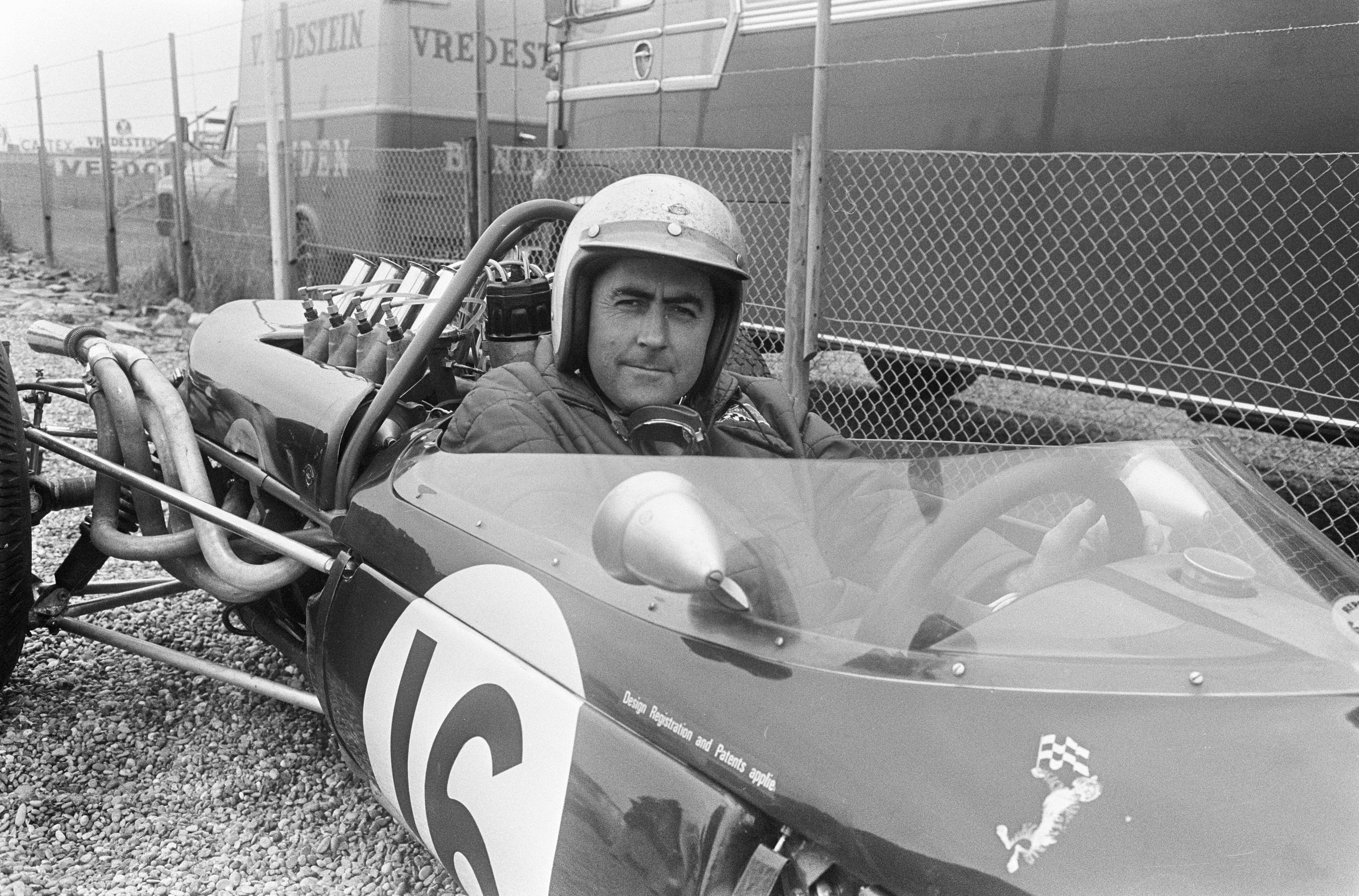
Brabham in the car before the 1966 Dutch Grand Prix at Zandvoort.

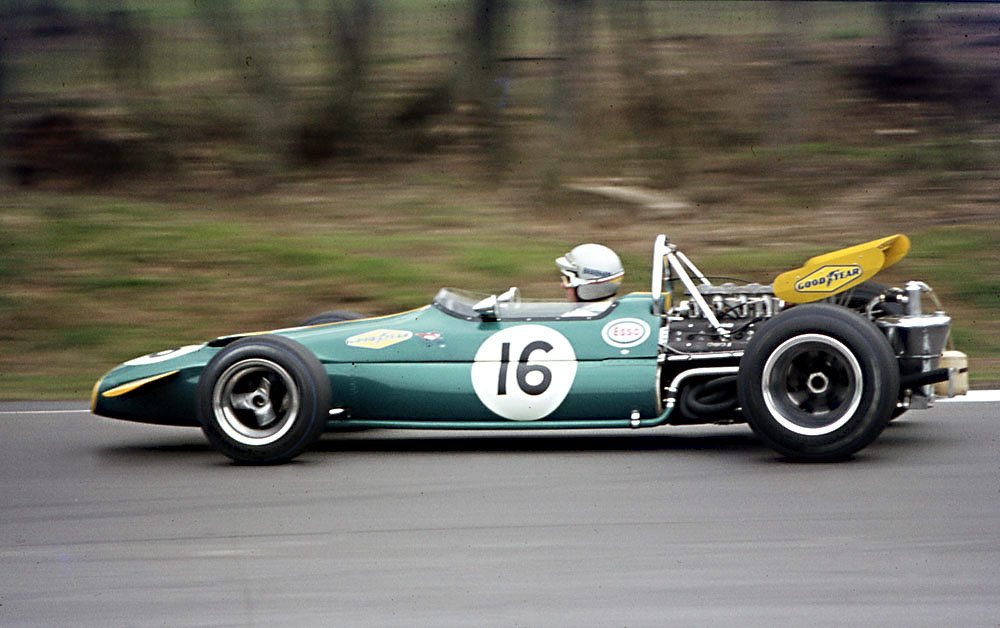
Brabham in his Brabham BT33 at the 1970 Race of Champions at Brands Hatch.

Brabham and Tauranac set up a company called Motor Racing Developments (MRD), which produced customer racing cars, while Brabham himself continued to race for Cooper. MRD produced cars for Formula Junior, with the first one appearing in mid-1961. Brabham left Cooper in 1962 to drive for his own team: the Brabham Racing Organisation, using cars built by Motor Racing Developments. (Note: Brabham, Nye (2004) pp. 14, 145–9 Brabham's and Tauranac's (Lawrence 1999 p. 32) accounts differ on whether the BRO was formed for the purpose of F1, or was already in existence.) A newly introduced engine limit in Formula One of 1500 cc did not suit Brabham and he did not win a single race with a 1500 cc car. His team suffered poor reliability during this period and motorsport authors Mike Lawrence and David Hodges have said that Brabham's reluctance to spend money may have cost the team results, a view echoed by Tauranac. (Note: Tauranac says (Lawrence (1999) p.48) that he feels a third mechanic would have reduced the reliability problems. Lawrence himself notes (Lawrence (1999) p.71) that 'If only Jack had been prepared to spend a little more money, the results could have been so much better'. Hodges (1990, p.32) notes, 'Economy was a watchword. ...It was this attitude, perhaps, which cost [Brabham] some races'.) During the 1965 season, Brabham started to consider retirement to manage his team. Dan Gurney, who had taken the team's first championship race win the previous year, took the lead driver role while Brabham gave up his car to several other drivers towards the end of the season. At the end of the season, Gurney announced his intention to leave and set up his own team and Brabham decided to carry on.

In 1966, a new 3-litre formula was created for Formula One. The new engines under development by other suppliers all had at least 12 cylinders and proved difficult to develop, being heavy and unreliable. Brabham took a different approach to the problem of obtaining a suitable engine: he persuaded Australian engineering company Repco to develop a new 3-litre eight-cylinder engine for him. Repco had experience in importing, servicing and producing Climax FPF F1 engines. Brabham had identified a suitable engine block in Oldsmobile's aluminium alloy F-85 215ci engine and persuaded the company that an engine could be designed around the block. Brabham and Repco were aware that the engine would not compete in terms of outright power, but felt that a lightweight, reliable engine could achieve good championship results while other teams were still making their new designs reliable.

The combination of the Repco-Brabham V8 engine, designed by Phil Irving, and the Brabham BT19 chassis designed by Tauranac worked. At the French Grand Prix at Reims-Gueux, Jack Brabham took his first Formula One world championship win since 1960 and became the first man to win such a race in a car of his own construction. Only his two former teammates, Bruce McLaren and Dan Gurney, have since matched this achievement. It was the first in a run of four straight wins for the Australian veteran. The 40-year-old Brabham was annoyed by press stories about his age and, in a highly uncharacteristic stunt, at the Dutch Grand Prix he hobbled to his car on the starting grid before the race wearing a long false beard and leaning on a cane before going on to win the race. Brabham confirmed his third championship at the Italian Grand Prix and became the only driver to win the Formula One World Championship in a car that carried his own name.

The 1966 season saw the fruition of Brabham's relationship with Japanese engine manufacturer Honda in Formula Two. After a generally unsuccessful 1965 season, Honda completely revised their 1-litre engine for 1966. While there was no European Formula Two championship that year, Brabham won ten of the year's 16 European Formula Two races in his Brabham-Honda, and won the Trophées de France, a championship consisting of six of the French Formula Two races.

In 1967, the Formula One title went to Brabham's teammate Denny Hulme. Hulme had better reliability through the year, possibly due to Brabham's desire to try new parts first.

Despite taking pole position in the first two rounds, mechanical problems halted his chances of victory. He spun numerous times in South Africa, and at Monaco, his engine blew up at the start, and the win went to his teammate Denny Hulme. At the Dutch Grand Prix, he scored his first podium of the season, with second place, behind Scotsman Jim Clark. He retired in the Belgian Grand Prix with another blown engine. He fixed this by winning the French Grand Prix at the Bugatti Circuit in Le Mans. He came fourth at the British Grand Prix, behind Chris Amon, his teammate Hulme, and Clark. At the German Grand Prix, he had a huge battle with Amon, and Brabham eventually finished ahead of the New Zealander, by only half a second. Hulme was the winner. At the first ever Canadian Grand Prix at Mosport Park, he took a huge win, ahead of Hulme, in cold and rainy conditions. At the Italian Grand Prix at Monza, Brabham had to finish second, only a few car lengths behind John Surtees, who took his last GP win. Hulme retired from the race, cutting the gap to 3 points between the two, as the circus headed for the United States, at Watkins Glen for the United States Grand Prix. Brabham outqualified his teammate, and finished fifth in the race, and with Hulme on the podium, this meant the championship chances were looking slim for Black Jack, as the circus went to Mexico for the championship deciding and final race of the season. Once again, he outqualified his teammate, and needed to win, with Hulme fifth or lower. But Jim Clark was simply too fast during the whole weekend, and dominated the race from pole to win, with Brabham finishing over 1 minute and 25 seconds behind. Hulme finished third, and so the New Zealander won the championship, while Brabham settled for second place. The team secured the Constructors' Championship, with 67 total points scored, and 23 points ahead of Lotus which scored a total of 44 points.

Brabham raced alongside his teammate Jochen Rindt during the 1968 season. It wasn't a good season for him. He retired from the first seven races, before scoring two points for fifth place at the German Grand Prix. He retired from the remaining four races. At the end of the year, he fulfilled a desire to fly from Britain to Australia in a small twin-engined Beechcraft Queen Air. Partway through the 1969 season, Brabham suffered serious injuries to his foot in a testing accident. He returned to racing before the end of the year, but promised his wife that he would retire after the season finished and sold his share of the team to Tauranac.

"I felt very sad, [...] I didn't feel I was giving up racing because I couldn't do the job. I felt I was just as competitive then as at any other time, and I really should have won the championship in 1970. [...] I'd have been a lot better off if I'd stayed, but sometimes family pressures don't allow you to make the decisions you'd like to."

— The World according to Jack, Motor Sport (May 1999) p.36

Finding no top drivers available despite coming close to bringing Rindt back to the team, Brabham decided to race for one more year. He began auspiciously, winning the first race of the season, the South African Grand Prix, and then led the third race, the Monaco Grand Prix until the very last turn of the last lap. Brabham was about to hold off the onrushing Rindt (the eventual 1970 F1 champion) when his front wheels locked in a skid on the sharp right turn only yards from the finish and he ended up second. While leading at the British Grand Prix at Brands Hatch, he ran out of fuel at Clearways and Rindt passed him to take the win while Brabham coasted to the finish in second place. After the 13th and final race of the season, the Mexican Grand Prix, Brabham did retire. He had tied Jackie Stewart for fifth in the points standings in the season he drove at the age of 44. Brabham also drove for the works Matra team during the 1970 World Sportscar Championship season and won the final race of the season and his final top level race at the Paris 1000 km in October that year. He then made a complete break from racing and returned to Australia, to the relief of his wife who had been "scared stiff" each time he drove.

== Retirement ==
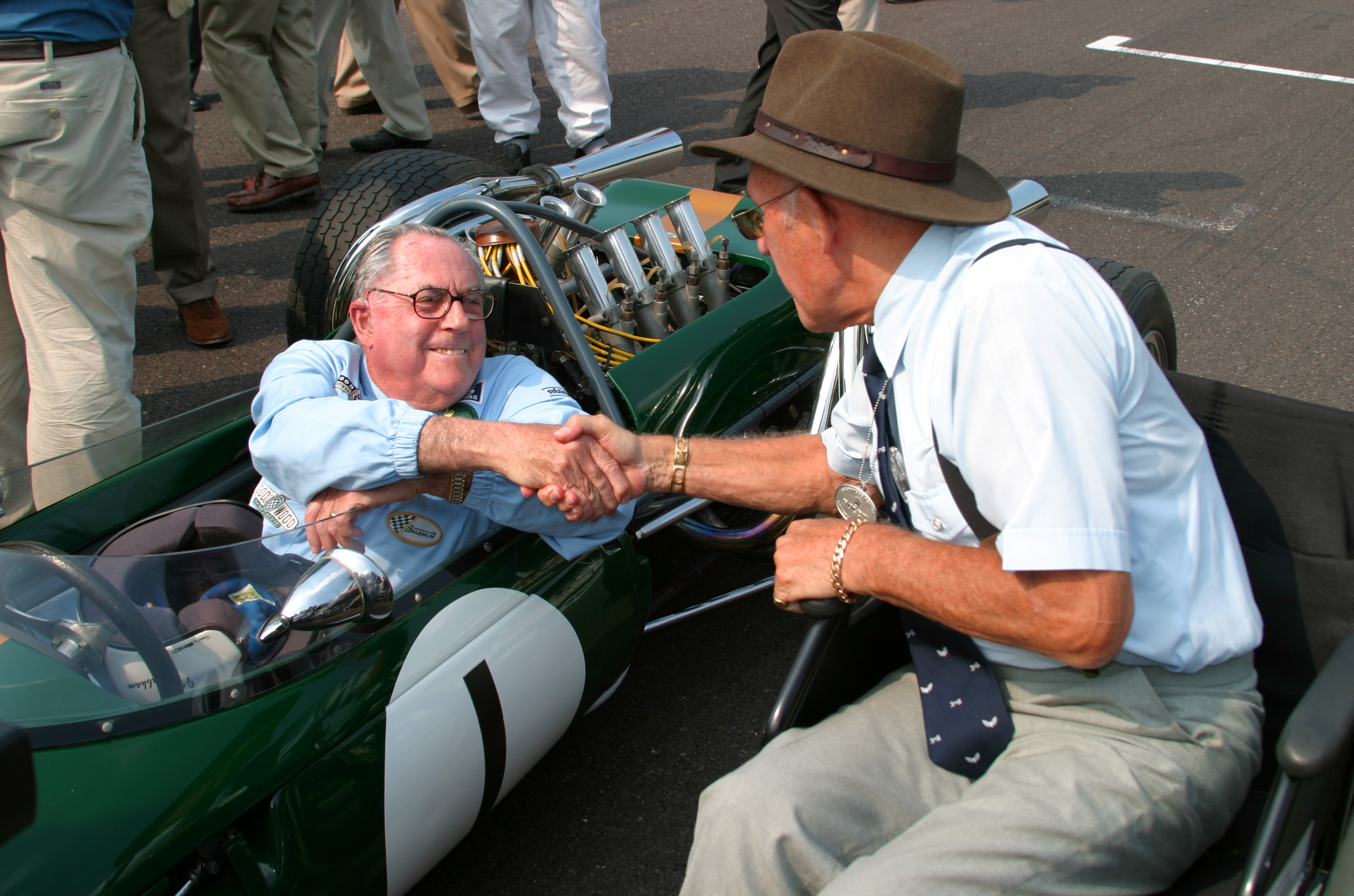
Brabham continued his involvement in motorsport after his retirement. Former rivals Brabham and Stirling Moss shake hands at the 2004 Goodwood Revival meeting.

Following his retirement, Brabham and his family moved to a farm between Sydney and Melbourne. Brabham says that he "never really wanted" the move, but his wife Betty hoped their sons could grow up away from motorsport. As well as running the new venture, he continued his interest in businesses in the UK and Australia, including a small aviation company and garages and car dealerships. He also set up Engine Developments Ltd. in 1971 with John Judd, who had worked for Brabham on the Repco engine project in the mid-1960s. The company builds engines for racing applications. Brabham was also a shareholder in Jack Brabham Engines Pty Ltd., an Australian company marketing Jack Brabham memorabilia.

The Brabham team continued in Formula One, winning two further Drivers' Championships in the early 1980s under Bernie Ecclestone's ownership. Although the original organisation went into administration in 1992, the name was attached to a German company selling cars and accessories in 2008, and an unsuccessful attempt to set up a new Formula One team the following year. On both occasions the Brabham family, which was unconnected to the ventures, announced its intention to take legal advice. In September 2014, Brabham's youngest son David announced Project Brabham, a new team planning to use a crowdsourcing business model to enter the 2015 FIA World Endurance Championship in the LMP2 category.

During his own retirement from international motorsport, Brabham continued to be semi-involved as both a driver in Australia, mostly racing touring cars in the famed Bathurst 1000 race, and supporting the racing ambitions of his 3 sons. His last ever international race came in December 1984 at the age of 58 in the last round of the 1984 World Sportscar Championship held at Sandown Park in Melbourne, the 1984 Sandown 1000. Jack drove as a guest driver in a Rothmans sponsored Porsche 956 co-driving with 1984 British Formula 3 champion and Scottish Aristocrat, Johnny Dumfries. The pair, driving a car with an in-car camera showing Jack up close and personal at the wheel for the first time, were not classified as finishers after only completing 108 laps. The race was Australia's first ever FISA World Championship road racing event, preceding the 1985 Australian Grand Prix in Adelaide by 11 months.

Despite his three titles, and although John Cooper considered him "the greatest", (Note: Drackett (1985) p.17 "Of course, he turned out one of the best. In my book, taking everything into consideration, the greatest. He was a damn good driver because he used his nut. Later when Bruce McLaren joined the team, what Bruce didn't know, Jack taught him. They were both good engineers. They could set up the cars and they didn't mind getting their hands dirty and working on them.") Formula One journalist Adam Cooper wrote in 1999 that Brabham is never listed among the Top 10 of all time, noting that "Stirling Moss and Jim Clark dominated the headlines when Jack was racing, and they still do". Brabham was the first post-war racing driver to be knighted when he received the honour in 1978 for services to motorsport. He has received several other honours and in 2011, the suburb of Brabham in Perth, Western Australia, was named after him. A race circuit and an automotive training school were also named after him in the early 2010s.

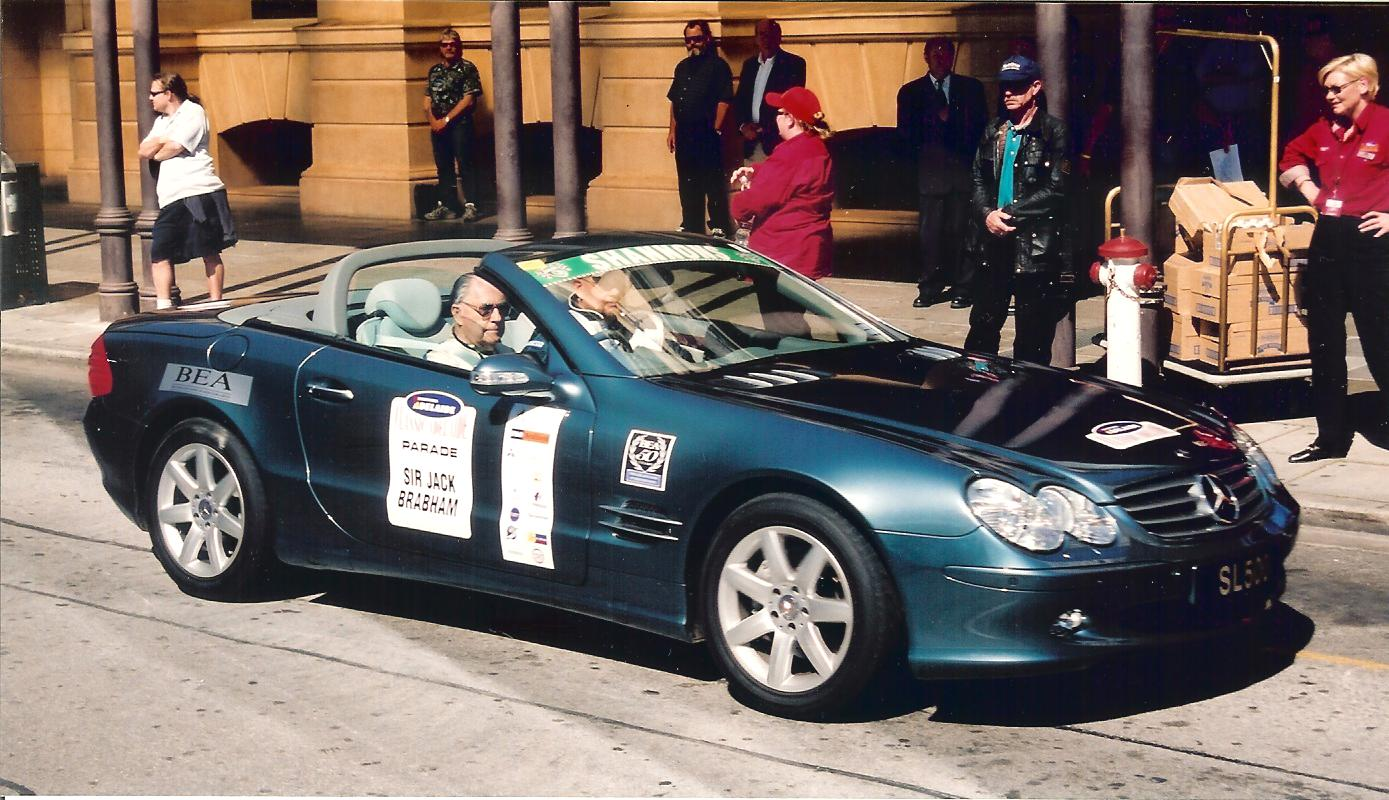
Brabham at the Classic Adelaide rally in 2002.

In retirement, Brabham continued to be involved in motorsport events, appearing at contemporary and historic motorsport events around the world where he often drove his former Cooper and Brabham cars until the early 2000s. In 1999, after competing at the Goodwood Revival at the age of 73 he commented that driving stopped him getting old. Despite a large accident at the 2000 Revival, the first racing accident to put him in hospital overnight, he continued to drive until at least 2004. By the late 2000s, ill-health was preventing him from driving in competition. In addition to the deafness caused by years of motor racing without adequate ear protection, his eyesight was reduced due to macular degeneration and he had kidney disease for which by 2009 he was receiving dialysis three times a week. Nonetheless, that year he attended a celebration of the 50th anniversary of his first world championship at the Phillip Island Classic festival of motorsport, and in 2010 flew to Bahrain with most of the other Formula One world Drivers' Champions for a celebration of 60 years of the Formula One world championship. Brabham was the oldest surviving F1 champion.

Brabham and Betty had three sons together: Geoff, Gary, and David. All three became involved in motorsport, with support from Brabham in their early years. Between them, they have won sportscar and single-seater races and championships. Geoff was an Indycar and sportscar racer who won five North American sportscar championships as well as the 24 Hours of Le Mans, while David competed in Formula One for the Brabham team and has also won the Le Mans race as well as three Japanese and North American sportscar titles. Gary also drove briefly in Formula One, although his F1 career consisted of two DNPQ's for the Life team. Brabham and Betty divorced in 1994 after 43 years. Brabham married his second wife, Margaret in 1995 and they lived on the Gold Coast, Queensland. Brabham's grandson Matthew (son of Geoff) graduated from karts in 2010 and won two ladders of the Road to Indy, eventually racing in the 2016 Indianapolis 500 and winning three Stadium Super Trucks championships. Another grandson, Sam, the son of David and Lisa, whose brother Mike also was an F1 driver, stepped up to car racing from karts in 2013 when he made his debut in the British Formula Ford Championship. The Brabham family have been involved in world-class motorsport for over 60 years.

== Death ==
Brabham made his last public appearance on 18 May 2014, appearing with one of the cars he built. He died at his home on the Gold Coast on 19 May 2014, aged 88, following a lengthy battle with liver disease. He was eating breakfast with his wife, Margaret, when he died. In a statement on the family's website, Brabham's son David confirmed his father's death.

"It's a very sad day for all of us", David Brabham stated. "My father passed away peacefully at home at the age of 88 this morning. He lived an incredible life, achieving more than anyone would ever dream of and he will continue to live on through the astounding legacy he leaves behind."

Brabham was the last surviving world champion from the 1950s era.

At his request, Brabham's ashes were scattered at the Tamborine Rainforest Skywalk in the Gold Coast hinterland on 4 September 2014. Brabham was a frequent visitor of the skywalk.

The suburb of Brabham, Western Australia is named after him and features an estate development, also called Brabham, located on the former site of the Caversham Motor Raceway.

== Honours and awards ==
- Hawthorn Memorial Trophy (1959, 1960 and 1966)
- Officer of the Order of the British Empire (OBE; for services to international motor-car racing, 1966)
- Australian of the Year (1966)
- Knight Bachelor (for distinguished service to the sport of motor racing, 1979)
- Inductee, Sport Australia Hall of Fame (1985, elevated to Legend status in 2003)
- Inductee, International Motorsports Hall of Fame (1990)
- Australian Sports Medal (2000)
- Centenary Medal (2001)
- Officer of the Order of Australia (AO; for service to motor sport as an ambassador, mentor and promoter of safety, and to the community through support of charitable organisations, 2008)
- Inductee, Australian Speedway Hall of Fame (2011)
- Named a National Living Treasure (2012)

== Racing record ==
=== Career summary ===
Season	Series	Team	Races	Wins	Poles	F/laps	Podiums	Points	Position
1955	Formula One	Cooper Car Company	1	0	0	0	0	0	NC
1956	Formula One	Jack Brabham	1	0	0	0	0	0	NC
1957	Formula One	Cooper Car Company	3	0	0	0	0	0	NC
1957	Formula One	Rob Walker Racing Team	2	0	0	0	0	0	NC
1957	World Sportscar Championship	Cooper Cars	1	0	0	0	0	0	NC
1957	24 Hours of Le Mans	Cooper Cars	1	0	0	0	0	N/A	15th
1958	Formula One	Cooper Car Company	9	0	0	0	0	3	18th
1958	World Sportscar Championship	David Brown, Aston Martin Ltd.	3	1	0	0	2	0	NC
1958	24 Hours of Le Mans	David Brown Racing Dept.	1	0	0	0	0	N/A	DNF
1959	Formula One	Cooper Car Company	8	2	1	1	5	31	**1st**
1959	World Sportscar Championship	John Coombs Racing Organisation	1	0	0	0	0	0	NC
1960	Formula One	Cooper Car Company	8	5	3	3	5	43	**1st**
1960	Formula Two	Cooper Car Company	5	2	1	0	3	20	**1st**
1961	Formula One	Cooper Car Company	8	0	1	1	0	4	11th
1961	USAC Championship Car	Cooper Car Company	1	0	0	0	0	200	20th
1962	Formula One	Brabham Racing Organisation	8	0	0	0	0	9	9th
1963	Formula One	Brabham Racing Organisation	10	0	0	0	1	14	7th
1963	British Saloon Car Championship	Alan Brown Racing Ltd	1	1	0	1	1	9	22nd
1964	Formula One	Brabham Racing Organisation	10	0	0	1	2	11	8th
1964	Tasman Series	Ecurie Vitesse	6	3	0	0	4	3	**2nd**
1964	USAC Championship Car	John Zink	1	0	0	0	0	0	NC
1964	British Saloon Car Championship	Alan Brown Racing Ltd	2	1	1	0	2	14	12th
1965	Formula One	Brabham Racing Organisation	6	0	0	0	1	9	10th
1965	Tasman Series	Ecurie Vitesse	3	0	0	0	3	21	**3rd**
1965	British Saloon Car Championship	Alan Brown Racing Ltd	3	1	1	0	1	12	15th
1966	Formula One	Brabham Racing Organisation	9	4	3	1	5	42	**1st**
1966	Tasman Series	Ecurie Vitesse	2	0	0	0	1	4	10th
1966	British Saloon Car Championship	Alan Brown Racing Ltd	3	1	1	1	3	20	12th
1967	Formula One	Brabham Racing Organisation	11	2	2	0	6	46	**2nd**
1967	Tasman Series	Ecurie Vitesse	6	1	0	0	2	18	**3rd**
1967	World Sportscar Championship	Sidney Taylor	1	0	0	0	0	0	NC
1968	Formula One	Brabham Racing Organisation	11	0	0	0	0	2	23rd
1968	Tasman Series	Brabham	2	0	0	0	0	0	NC
1968	World Sportscar Championship	Alan Mann Racing Limited	0	0	0	0	0	0	NC
1969	Formula One	Motor Racing Developments Ltd	8	0	2	1	2	14	10th
1969	Tasman Series	Brabham	1	0	0	0	1	4	8th
1969	World Sportscar Championship	Alan Mann Racing Ltd.	0	0	0	0	0	0	NC
1969	USAC Championship Car	Brabham	1	0	0	0	0	0	NC
1970	Formula One	Motor Racing Developments Ltd	13	1	1	4	4	25	6th
1970	World Sportscar	Matra Sports / Equipe Matra-Elf	4	0	0	0	0	0	NC
1970	24 Hours of Le Mans	Equipe Matra-Simca	1	0	0	0	0	N/A	DNF
1970	USAC Championship Car	Brabham	1	0	0	0	0	0	NC
1976	Bathurst 1000	Esmonds Motors	1	0	0	0	0	N/A	DNF
1977	Bathurst 1000	John Goss Racing Pty Limited	1	0	0	0	0	N/A	18th
1978	Bathurst 1000	Jack Brabham Holdings Pty Ltd	1	0	0	0	0	N/A	6th
1980	British Saloon Car Championship	SRG	1	0	0	0	0	2	37th
1984	World Sportscar Championship	Rothmans Porsche	0	0	0	0	0	0	NC

=== Complete Formula One World Championship results ===
(key) (Races in bold indicate pole position; races in italics indicate fastest lap)

Year	Entrant	Chassis	Engine	1	2	3	4	5	6	7	8	9	10	11	12	13	WDC	Points
1955	Cooper Car Company	Cooper T40	Bristol BS1 2.0 L6	ARG	MON	500	BEL	NED	GBR; Ret	ITA							NC	0
1956	Jack Brabham	Maserati 250F	Maserati 250F1 2.5 L6	ARG	MON	500	BEL	FRA	GBR; Ret	GER	ITA						NC	0
1957	Cooper Car Company	Cooper T43	Climax FPF 2.0 L4	ARG	MON; 6	500	FRA; 7 *			PES; 7	ITA						NC	0
1957	Rob Walker Racing Team	Cooper T43	Climax FPF 2.0 L4					GBR; Ret									NC	0
1957	Rob Walker Racing Team	Cooper T43	Climax FPF 1.5 L4						GER; Ret †								NC	0
1958	Cooper Car Company	Cooper T45	Climax FPF 2.0 L4	ARG	MON; 4	NED; 8	500	BEL; Ret	FRA; 6	GBR; 6		POR; 7	ITA; Ret				18th	3
1958	Cooper Car Company	Cooper T45	Climax FPF 1.5 L4								GER; Ret †			MOR; 11 †			18th	3
1959	Cooper Car Company	Cooper T51	Climax FPF 2.5 L4	MON; 1	500	NED; 2	FRA; 3	**GBR**; 1	GER; Ret	POR; Ret	ITA; 3	USA; 4					**1st**	**31 (34)**
1960	Cooper Car Company	Cooper T51	Climax FPF 2.5 L4	ARG; Ret													**1st**	**43**
1960	Cooper Car Company	Cooper T53	Climax FPF 2.5 L4		MON; DSQ	500	NED; 1	**BEL**; 1	**FRA**; 1	**GBR**; 1	POR; 1	ITA	USA; 4				**1st**	**43**
1961	Cooper Car Company	Cooper T55	Climax FPF 1.5 L4	MON; Ret	NED; 6	BEL; Ret	FRA; Ret	GBR; 4									11th	4
1961	Cooper Car Company	Cooper T58	Climax FWMV 1.5 V8						GER; Ret	ITA; Ret	**USA**; Ret						11th	4
1962	Brabham Racing Organisation	Lotus 24	Climax FWMV 1.5 V8	NED; Ret	MON; 8	BEL; 6	FRA; Ret	GBR; 5									9th	9
1962	Brabham Racing Organisation	Brabham BT3	Climax FWMV 1.5 V8						GER; Ret	ITA	USA; 4	RSA; 4					9th	9
1963	Brabham Racing Organisation	Lotus 25	Climax FWMV 1.5 V8	MON; 9													7th	14
1963	Brabham Racing Organisation	Brabham BT3	Climax FWMV 1.5 V8		BEL; Ret					ITA; 5							7th	14
1963	Brabham Racing Organisation	Brabham BT7	Climax FWMV 1.5 V8			NED; Ret	FRA; 4	GBR; Ret	GER; 7		USA; 4	MEX; 2	RSA; 13				7th	14
1964	Brabham Racing Organisation	Brabham BT7	Climax FWMV 1.5 V8	MON; Ret	NED; Ret	BEL; 3	FRA; 3	GBR; 4	GER; 12								8th	11
1964	Brabham Racing Organisation	Brabham BT11	Climax FWMV 1.5 V8							AUT; 9	ITA; 14	USA; Ret	MEX; Ret				8th	11
1965	Brabham Racing Organisation	Brabham BT11	Climax FWMV 1.5 V8	RSA; 8	MON; Ret	BEL; 4	FRA	GBR; DNS	NED	GER; 5	ITA	USA; 3	MEX; Ret				10th	9
1966	Brabham Racing Organisation	Brabham BT19	Repco 620 3.0 V8	MON; Ret	BEL; 4	FRA; 1	**GBR**; 1	**NED**; 1	GER; 1	ITA; Ret							**1st**	**42 (45)**
1966	Brabham Racing Organisation	Brabham BT20	Repco 620 3.0 V8								**USA**; Ret	MEX; 2					**1st**	**42 (45)**
1967	Brabham Racing Organisation	Brabham BT20	Repco 620 3.0 V8	**RSA**; 6													**2nd**	**46 (48)**
1967	Brabham Racing Organisation	Brabham BT19	Repco 740 3.0 V8		**MON**; Ret	NED; 2											**2nd**	**46 (48)**
1967	Brabham Racing Organisation	Brabham BT24	Repco 740 3.0 V8				BEL; Ret	FRA; 1	GBR; 4	GER; 2	CAN; 1	ITA; 2	USA; 5	MEX; 2			**2nd**	**46 (48)**
1968	Brabham Racing Organisation	Brabham BT24	Repco 740 3.0 V8	RSA; Ret													23rd	2
1968	Brabham Racing Organisation	Brabham BT26	Repco 860 3.0 V8		ESP; DNS	MON; Ret	BEL; Ret	NED; Ret	FRA; Ret	GBR; Ret	GER; 5	ITA; Ret	CAN; Ret	USA; Ret	MEX; 10		23rd	2
1969	Motor Racing Developments Ltd	Brabham BT26A	Ford Cosworth DFV 3.0 V8	**RSA**; Ret	ESP; Ret	MON; Ret	NED; 6	FRA	GBR	GER	ITA; Ret	CAN; 2	USA; 4	**MEX**; 3			10th	14
1970	Motor Racing Developments Ltd	Brabham BT33	Ford Cosworth DFV 3.0 V8	RSA; 1	**ESP**; Ret	MON; 2	BEL; Ret	NED; 11	FRA; 3	GBR; 2	GER; Ret	AUT; 13	ITA; Ret	CAN; Ret	USA; 10	MEX; Ret	6th	25

* Indicates shared drive with Mike MacDowel
† Indicates Formula 2 car

=== Formula One non-championship results ===
(key) (Races in bold indicate pole position) (Races in italics indicate fastest lap)

Year	Entrant	Chassis	Engine	1	2	3	4	5	6	7	8	9	10	11	12	13	14	15	16	17	18	19	20	21
1955	J. A. Brabham	Cooper T24	Alta Straight-4	BUE	VLN	PAU	GLV; Ret	BOR	INT; 7	NAP	ALB	CUR	CRN											
1955	J. A. Brabham	Cooper T40	Bristol Straight-6													RDX; 4	TLG	OUL	AVO	SYR				
1955	Cooper Car Company	Cooper T40	Bristol Straight-6											LON; DNS	REC; 4									
1956	J. A. Brabham	Maserati 250F	Maserati Straight-6	BUE	GLV; DNA	SYR	AIN; 3	INT; DSQ	NAP	100; DNA	VNW; 3	CAE	BRH											
1957	Rob Walker Racing Team	Cooper T41 (F2)	Climax Straight-4	BUE	SYR; NC	PAU																		
1957	Rob Walker Racing Team	Cooper T43	Climax Straight-4										MOR; DSQ											
1957	Cooper Car Company	Cooper T43	Climax Straight-4				GLV; 4	NAP	RMS; NC	CAE; Ret	INT; Ret	MOD												
1958	Cooper Car Company	Cooper T45	Climax Straight-4	BUE	GLV; 2	SYR	AIN; 2	INT; 5	CAE															
1959	Cooper Car Company	Cooper T51	Climax Straight-4	GLV; 2	AIN; Ret	INT; 1	OUL; 2	SIL; 2																
1960	Cooper Car Company	Cooper T51	Climax Straight-4	BUE; Ret	GLV																			
1960	Cooper Car Company	Cooper T53	Climax Straight-4			INT; 2	SIL; 1	LOM	OUL; 2															
1961	Cooper Car Company	Cooper T53	Climax Straight-4	LOM; 1	GLV	**PAU**; Ret	BRX; 1	VIE					SIL; Ret	SOL; 5	KAN; Ret	DAN; Ret	MOD; 5	FLG; 2						
1961	Cooper Car Company	Cooper T55	Climax Straight-4						AIN; 1	SYR; 4	NAP	LON							OUL; 2	LEW	VAL	RAN	NAT	RSA
1962	Brabham Racing Organisation	Lotus 21	Climax V8	CAP	BRX	LOM; DNA	LAV	GLV	PAU; Ret	AIN; Ret														
1962	Brabham Racing Organisation	Lotus 24	Climax V8								INT; 6	NAP	MAL; 2	CLP	RMS; 4	SOL	KAN	MED	**DAN**; 1					
1962	Brabham Racing Organisation	Brabham BT3	Climax V8																	OUL; 3	MEX; 2	RAN	NAT	
1963	Brabham Racing Organisation	Brabham BT3	Climax V8	LOM	GLV; 6	PAU	IMO	SYR	AIN; DNS	INT; 7	ROM	SOL; 1			AUT; 1									
1963	Brabham Racing Organisation	Brabham BT7	Climax V8										**KAN**; 3	MED; 12		OUL; 4	RAN							
1964	Brabham Racing Organisation	Brabham BT7	Climax V8	DMT; Ret	**NWT**; Ret	SYR	AIN; 1	INT; 1	SOL; Ret	MED	RAN													
1965	Brabham Racing Organisation	Brabham BT11	Climax V8	ROC; Ret	SYR	SMT; 3	INT; Ret	MED; 6																
1965	Scuderia Scribante	Brabham BT11	Climax V8						**RAN**; 1															
1966	Brabham Racing Organisation	Brabham BT19	Repco V8	**RSA**; Ret	SYR; Ret	**INT**; 1	**OUL**; 1																	
1967	Brabham Racing Organisation	Brabham BT20	Repco V8	ROC; 7	SPC; 1	INT; 2	SYR																	
1967	Brabham Racing Organisation	Brabham BT24	Repco V8					**OUL**; 1																
1967	Brabham Racing Organisation	Brabham BT19	Repco V8						ESP; 3															
1968	Brabham Racing Organisation	Brabham BT26	Repco V8	ROC	INT	OUL; Ret																		
1969	Brabham Racing Organisation	Brabham BT26A	Cosworth V8	ROC; Ret	INT; 1	MAD	OUL																	
1970	Brabham Racing Organisation	Brabham BT33	Cosworth V8	ROC; 4	INT; Ret	OUL																		

=== Complete Tasman Series results ===
Year	Car	1	2	3	4	5	6	7	8	Rank	Points
1964	Brabham BT7A	LEV	PUK; Ret	WIG; 2	TER	SAN; 1	WAR; 1	LAK; 1	LON; Ret	2nd	33
1965	Brabham BT11A	PUK	LEV	WIG	TER	WAR; 2	SAN; 1	LON; 2		3rd	21
1966	Brabham BT19	PUK	LEV	WIG	TER	WAR	LAK	SAN; Ret	LON; 3	10th	4
1967	Brabham BT23A	PUK; Ret	WIG; 13	LAK; 2	WAR; 4	SAN; NC	LON; 1			3rd	18
1968	Brabham BT21E	PUK	LEV	WIG	TER	SUR	WAR; 7	SAN; Ret	LON	NC	0
1969	Brabham BT31B	PUK	LEV	WIG	TER	LAK	WAR	SAN; 3		8th	4

=== Complete World Sportscar Championship results ===
Colour	Result
Gold	Winner
Silver	Second place
Bronze	Third place
Green	Points classification
Blue	Non-points classification
Blue	Non-classified finish (NC)
Purple	Retired, not classified (Ret)
Red	Did not qualify (DNQ)
Red	Did not pre-qualify (DNPQ)
Black	Disqualified (DSQ)
White	Did not start (DNS)
White	Withdrew (WD)
White	Race cancelled (C)
Blank	Did not practice (DNP)
Blank	Did not arrive (DNA)
Blank	Excluded (EX)

(Races in bold indicate pole position) (Races in italics indicate fastest lap)

Year	Team	Car	1	2	3	4	5	6	7	8	9	10	11	12	13	14	DC	Points
1957	Cooper Cars	Cooper T39	BUE	SEB	TAR	NUR	LMS; 15	SWE	VEN								NC	0
1958	David Brown, Aston Martin Ltd.	Aston Martin DBR1/300	BUE	SEB	TAR	NUR; 1	LMS; Ret	RAC; 2									NC	0
1959	John Coombs Racing Organisation	Cooper-Climax Monaco T49	SEB	TAR	NUR	LMS	RAC; Ret										NC	0
1967	Sidney Taylor	Lola T70 Chevrolet	DAY	SEB	MNZ	SPA	TAR	NUR	LMS	HOC	MUG	BRA; Ret	PER	ZEL	VIL	NUR	NC	0
1968	Alan Mann Racing Limited	Ford F3L	DAY	SEB	BRA; DNS	MNZ	TAR	NUR	SPA	WAT	ZEL	LMS					NC	0
1969	Alan Mann Racing Ltd.	Ford F3L	DAY	SEB	BRA; DNS	MNZ	TAR	SPA	NUR	LMS	WAT	ZEL					NC	0
1970	Matra Sports / Equipe Matra-Elf	Matra MS650	DAY; 10	SEB	BRA; 12	MNZ; 5	TAR	SPA	NUR	LMS; Ret	WAT	ZEL					NC	0
1984	Rothmans Porsche GTi Engineering	Porsche 956B	MNZ	SIL	LMS	NUR	BRA	MOS	SPA	IMO	FJI	KYL	SAN; NC				NC	0

=== Complete 24 Hours of Le Mans results ===
Results
Year	Team	Co-drivers	Car	Class	Laps	Pos.	Class pos.
1957	(United Kingdom) Cooper Cars	(United Kingdom) Ian Raby	Cooper T39	S 1.1	254	15th	**3rd**
1958	(United Kingdom) David Brown Racing Dept.	(United Kingdom) Stirling Moss	Aston Martin DBR1/300	S3.0	30	DNF (Con rod)	
1970	(France) Equipe Matra-Simca	(France) François Cevert	Matra-Simca MS650	P 3.0	76	DNF	

=== Indianapolis 500 results ===
Year	Car	Start	Qual	Rank	Finish	Laps	Led	Retired
1961	17	13	145.144	17	9	200	0	Running
1964	52	25	152.504	15	20	77	0	Fuel Tank
1969	95	29	163.875	29	24	58	0	Ignition
1970	32	26	166.397	22	13	175	1	Piston
**Totals**						510	1	

Starts	4
Poles	0
Front row	0
Wins	0
Top 5	0
Top 10	1
Retired	3

=== Complete British Saloon Car Championship results ===
(key) (Races in bold indicate pole position; races in italics indicate fastest lap.)

Year	Team	Car	Class	1	2	3	4	5	6	7	8	9	10	11	Pos.	Pts	Class
1963	Alan Brown Racing Ltd	Ford Galaxie	D	SNE	OUL	GOO	AIN	SIL	CRY	SIL	BRH	BRH	OUL	SIL ovr:1 cls:1	22nd	9	6th
1964	Alan Brown Racing Ltd	Ford Galaxie	D	**SNE** ovr:1 cls:1	GOO; DNS	OUL	AIN	SIL	CRY	BRH	OUL ovr:3 cls:1				12th	14	5th
1965	Alan Brown Racing Ltd	Ford Mustang	D	BRH	OUL	SNE	GOO	SIL	CRY ovr:6† cls:3†	**BRH** ovr:1 cls:1	OUL; DSQ				15th	12	4th
1966	Alan Brown Racing Ltd	Ford Mustang	D	SNE ovr:1 cls:1	**GOO** ovr:2 cls:2	SIL; DNS	CRY ovr:2† cls:2†	BRH	BRH	OUL	BRH				12th	20	4th
1980	SRG	Renault 5 Gordini	B	MAL	OUL	THR	SIL	SIL	BRH ovr:18 cls:5	MAL	BRH	THR	SIL		37th	2	12th

† Events with 2 races staged for the different classes.

=== Complete Bathurst 1000 results ===
Year	Team	Co-drivers	Car	Class	Laps	Pos.	Class pos.
1976	(Australia) Esmonds Motors	(United Kingdom) Stirling Moss	Holden LH Torana SL/R 5000 L34	3001cc – 6000cc	37	DNF	
1977	(Australia) John Goss Racing Pty Limited	(Australia) Geoff Brabham	Ford XC Falcon GS500 Hardtop	3001cc – 6000cc	141	18th	9th
1978	(Australia) Jack Brabham Holdings Pty Ltd	(Australia) Brian Muir	Holden LX Torana SS A9X 4 Door	A	153	6th	6th

== Notes ==
Sporting positions
Preceded by Peter Collins	BRDC International Trophy; Winner; 1959	Succeeded by Innes Ireland
Preceded by Mike Hawthorn	Formula One World Champion; 1959–1960	Succeeded by Phil Hill
Preceded by Jim Clark	BRDC International Trophy; Winner; 1964	Succeeded by Jackie Stewart
Preceded by Jackie Stewart	BRDC International Trophy; Winner; 1966	Succeeded by Mike Parkes
Preceded by Jim Clark	Formula One World Champion; 1966	Succeeded by Denny Hulme
Preceded by Denny Hulme	BRDC International Trophy; Winner; 1969	Succeeded by Chris Amon
Awards
Preceded by Inaugural award	Hawthorn Memorial Trophy; 1959–1960	Succeeded by Stirling Moss
Preceded by Jim Clark	Hawthorn Memorial Trophy; 1966	Succeeded by Denny Hulme
Records
Preceded by Maurice Trintignant; 84 entries, 82 starts (1950–1964)	Most Grand Prix entries 128 entries, 126 starts (1955 – 1970), 85th at the 1966 Monaco GP	Succeeded by Graham Hill; 178 entries (176 starts), 129th at the 1971 Dutch GP
