= Cooper T58 =

Formula One race car

- Category: Formula One
- Constructor: Cooper
- Designer: Owen Maddock
- Predecessor: Cooper T55
- Successor: Cooper T60

Technical specifications
- Chassis: tubular spaceframe
- Suspension (front): Double wishbone, coil spring and damper
- Suspension (rear): Double wishbone, coil spring and damper
- Engine: Coventry Climax FWMV, 1496cc, 90° V8 Naturally aspirated mid-mounted
- Transmission: Cooper 5-speed manual
- Weight: 465 kg (1,025 lb)
- Tyres: Dunlop

Competition history
- Notable entrants: Cooper Car Company
- Notable drivers: Jack Brabham
- Debut: 1961 German Grand Prix
Races	Wins	Poles	F/Laps
3	0	1	1
- Constructors' Championships: 0
- Drivers' Championships: 0
- Unless otherwise stated, all data refer to Formula One World Championship Grands Prix only.

The Cooper T58 was a Formula One car built by Cooper Car Company for the 1961 Formula One season. Only one example was built; it set one pole position and one fastest lap but scored no wins.

== Development ==
The car was effectively a T55 modified to act as a test mule for the Coventry Climax FWMV V8 engine.

== Racing history ==
The T58 made its debut at the 1961 German Grand Prix. Jack Brabham qualified second behind Phil Hill's Ferrari and briefly led the race but crashed on the first lap. Brabham qualified tenth at the Italian and on pole and set fastest lap at the United States but retired from both races due to overheating.

The Cooper team scored 14 World Championship points during 1961 but none were scored with the T58, the team reverted to the older T55 and the newer Cooper T60 for 1962.

The car was then sold to the Reg Parnell Racing team, who entered it in one race only, the non-championship 1962 Mexican Grand Prix, fitted with a BRM V8 engine. Driver Moises Solana withdrew from the race, claiming that the car was too slow, although his times were faster than at least four other drivers who did take part.

== Complete Formula One World Championship results ==
Year	Entrants	Engine	Tyres	Drivers	1	2	3	4	5	6	7	8	Points	WCC
1961	Cooper Car Company	Coventry Climax FWMV 3.0 V8	D		MON	NED	BEL	FRA	GBR	GER	ITA	USA	14 (18) (Note: All the points scored in 1961 were with the Cooper T53 and Cooper T55.)	4th
1961	Cooper Car Company	Coventry Climax FWMV 3.0 V8	D	Jack Brabham						Ret	Ret	Ret	14 (18)	4th
