= 1954 BARC Aintree 200 =

1954 Aintree 200
- Aintree Circuit

Race details
- Date: 29 May 1954
- Official name: BARC Daily Telegraph Aintree 200
- Location: Aintree Circuit, Merseyside
- Course: Permanent racing facility
- Course length: 2.999 mi (4.826 km)
- Distance: 34 laps, 101.97 mi (164.10 km)
- Weather: Wet
- Attendance: 25,000

Fastest lap
| Driver | (United Kingdom) Peter Collins | Ferrari |
- Time: 2:12

Podium
| First | (United Kingdom) Stirling Moss | Maserati |
| Second | (United Kingdom) Reg Parnell | Ferrari |
| Third | (United Kingdom) Ron Flockhart | BRM |

The 1954 Aintree 200 was a Formula Libre race held on 29 May 1954. The race was held over two heats of 17 laps and a final of 34 laps. Reg Parnell won the first heat and Ron Flockhart the second, and Stirling Moss won the final in a Maserati 250F. Peter Collins set the fastest lap in the first heat and also fastest of the day in the final, with Roy Salvadori fastest in the second heat.

== Results ==
=== Final ===
| Pos | Driver | Constructor | Time/Retired |
|---|---|---|---|
| 1 | (United Kingdom) Stirling Moss | Maserati 250F | 1:18:48.4 |
| 2 | (United Kingdom) Reg Parnell | Ferrari 625 | +48.2 |
| 3 | (United Kingdom) Ron Flockhart | BRM Type 15 | +1:44.2 |
| 4 | (United Kingdom) Bob Gerard | Cooper-Bristol | +1:45.6 |
| 5 | (United Kingdom) Roy Salvadori | Maserati | +1 lap |
| 6 | (United Kingdom) Kenneth McAlpine | Connaught Type A-Lea Francis | |
| 7 | (United Kingdom) Graham Whitehead | ERA | |
| 8 | (United Kingdom) Leslie Marr | Connaught Type A-Lea Francis | |
| 9 | (France) Philippe Étancelin | Talbot-Lago T26C | |
| 10 | (France) André Pilette | Gordini Type 16 | |
| 11 | (Thailand) B. Bira | Maserati | |
| | (United Kingdom) Charles Boulton | Connaught Type A-Lea Francis | |
| | (United Kingdom) Rodney Nuckey | Cooper-Bristol | |
| | (United Kingdom) Leslie Thorne | Connaught Type A-Lea Francis | |
| | (United Kingdom) Jack Fairman | Turner-Alta | |
| Ret | (France) Jean Behra | Gordini Type 16 | |
| Ret | (United Kingdom) Keith Hall | Cooper-Bristol | Gasket |
| Ret | (United Kingdom) Ken Wharton | BRM Type 15 | Brakes |
| Ret | (United Kingdom) Peter Collins | Ferrari 375 Thinwall Special | |
| Ret | (United Kingdom) Tony Rolt | Connaught Type A-Lea Francis | |
| Ret | (United Kingdom) Alastair Birrell | ERA | |
