= Aintree Motor Racing Circuit =

Motor racing circuit in Liverpool, England

- Location: Aintree, Merseyside, England
- Coordinates: 53°28′37″N 2°56′26″W
- Opened: 1954
- Major events: Formula One; British Grand Prix (1955, 1957, 1959, 1961–1962)

Grand Prix Circuit (1954–1964)
- Length: 4.828 km (3.000 mi)
- Turns: 8
- Race lap record: 1:51.800 ( (United Kingdom) Jim Clark, Lotus 25, 1963, F1)

Club Circuit (1954–present)
- Length: 2.470 km (1.535 mi)
- Turns: 4

Aintree Motor Racing Circuit is a 3.000 mi (4.828 km) motor-racing circuit in the village of Aintree, Metropolitan Borough of Sefton, Merseyside, England. The circuit is within the Aintree Racecourse, and used the same grandstands as horse racing. It was built in 1954 as the "Goodwood of the North", because the two venues had so many things in common. The track was well-surfaced and relatively flat, ranging from 49 to 98 ft (15 to 30 m) in elevation.

== History ==
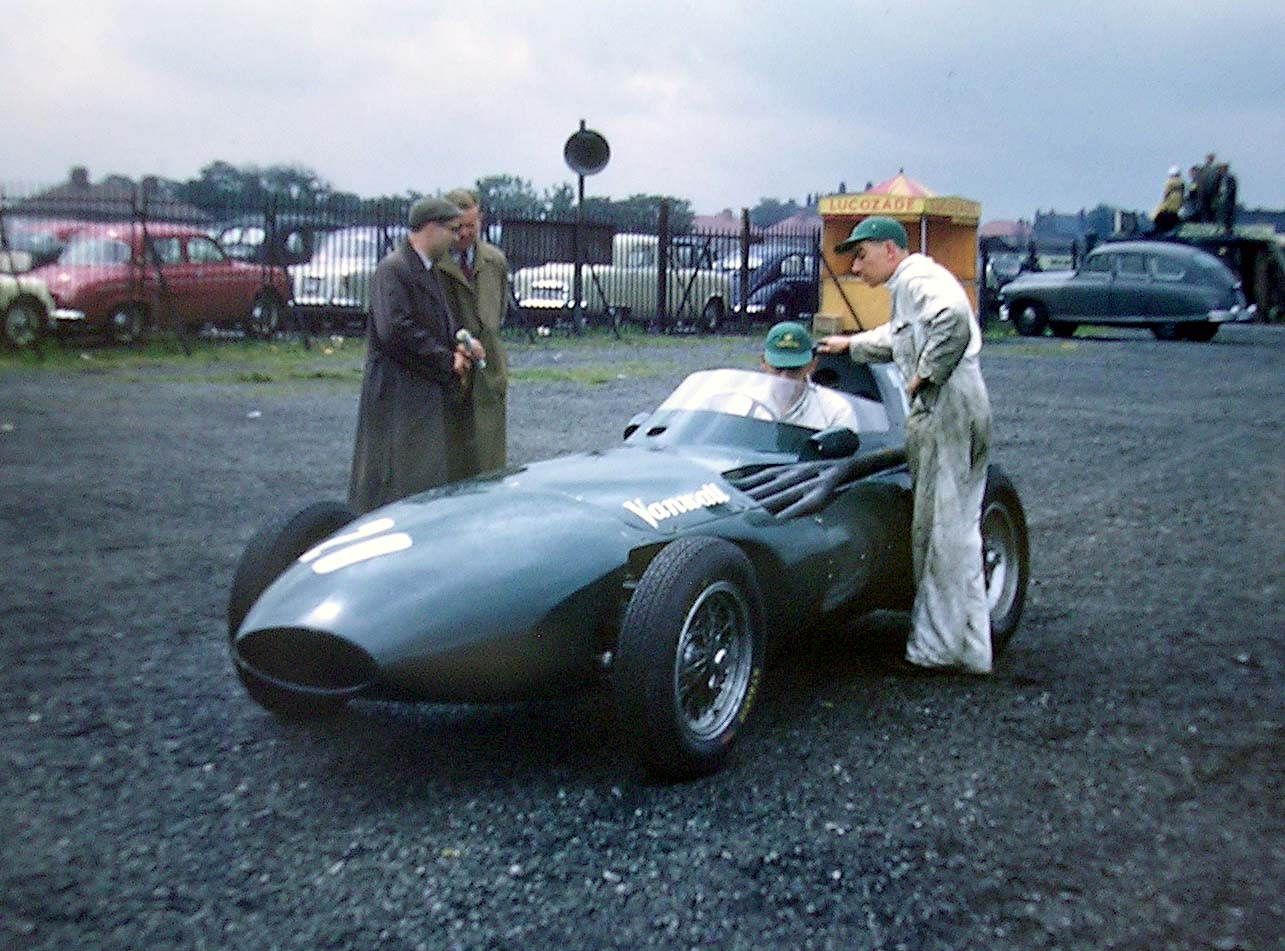
A Vanwall VW5 before the start of the 1957 British Grand Prix

The circuit hosted the Formula One British Grand Prix five times, in 1955, 1957, 1959, 1961 and 1962.

In addition to the Grands Prix, which were organised by the British Automobile Racing Club, the circuit held eleven non-championship Formula One races, known as the Aintree 200, first won by Stirling Moss in 1954 with the last winner being Jack Brabham, in April 1964 (Brabham had made his Formula One debut at the circuit in the 1955 British GP). Aintree was the location for the famous race in 1955 in which Moss won his first British Grand Prix, driving a Mercedes. Two years later, he and Tony Brooks became the first British drivers to win the British Grand Prix and a round of the Formula One World Championship in a British car, the Vanwall. The 1957 Grand Prix, titled the "European Grand Prix", was the premier Formula One event of the season, attracting 150,000 spectators.

The full Grand Prix circuit was last raced on in 1964, but part of it – the 1.535 mi (2.470 km) Club Circuit – remained open, and was operated by the Aintree Circuit Club from the mid-1960s to the late 1990s. In the 1980s the 108 Car Club (St. Helens) brought rallying back to Aintree Circuit revitalising the circuit's use with new ideas. The Club Circuit is situated within the Aintree Grand National Course, and itself encloses a public nine-hole golf course operated by Aintree Racecourse.

== Events ==
A limited amount of motorsport continues today in the form of car sprints, track days and motorcycle racing on the Club Circuit.

Motorcycle events have been organised by Aintree Motor Cycle Racing Club since 1982; it holds six events at Aintree each year.

Car events are organised by Liverpool Motor Club in the form of three sprints, in May, June and September, and two track days in April and August on the Club Circuit.

In addition, the Club Circuit sees occasional use by visiting events such as the Greenpower Electric Car Races for Schools, Sporting Bears Motor Club giving Dream Rides for charity, and bicycle racing.

== Records ==
Nick Algar, the 2010 British Sprint Champion, set a new course record of 0:35.82 seconds on the 1.148 mi (1.847 km) sprint course on 26 June 2010 in a Gould GR55 3500cc. The record was previously set by Roy Dawson on 8 September 2007 in the same car, in a time of 0:36.03 seconds. Nick Algar's speed through the finish line speed trap was 172 mph (277 km/h), although he did manage a speed of 176 mph (283 km/h) on an earlier run that day. As of March 2023, his record still stood, despite several drivers attempting to beat it.

The fastest official race lap records at the Aintree Motor Racing Circuit are listed as:

Category	Time	Driver	Vehicle	Event
Full Circuit (1954–1964): 3.000 mi (4.828 km)
Formula One	1:51.800	Jim Clark	Lotus 25	1963 Aintree 200
Formula Two	2:04.400	Tony Brooks	Cooper T43	1958 BARC Aintree 200
