= Fred Wacker =

American racing driver (1918–1998)

- Born: July 10, 1918; Chicago, Illinois, U.S.
- Died: June 16, 1998 (aged 79); Lake Bluff, Illinois, U.S.

Formula One World Championship career
- Nationality: (United States) American
- Active years: 1953–1954
- Team: Gordini
- Entries: 5 (3 starts)
- Championships: 0
- Wins: 0
- Podiums: 0
- Career points: 0
- Pole positions: 0
- Fastest laps: 0
- First entry: 1953 Dutch Grand Prix
- Last entry: 1954 Italian Grand Prix

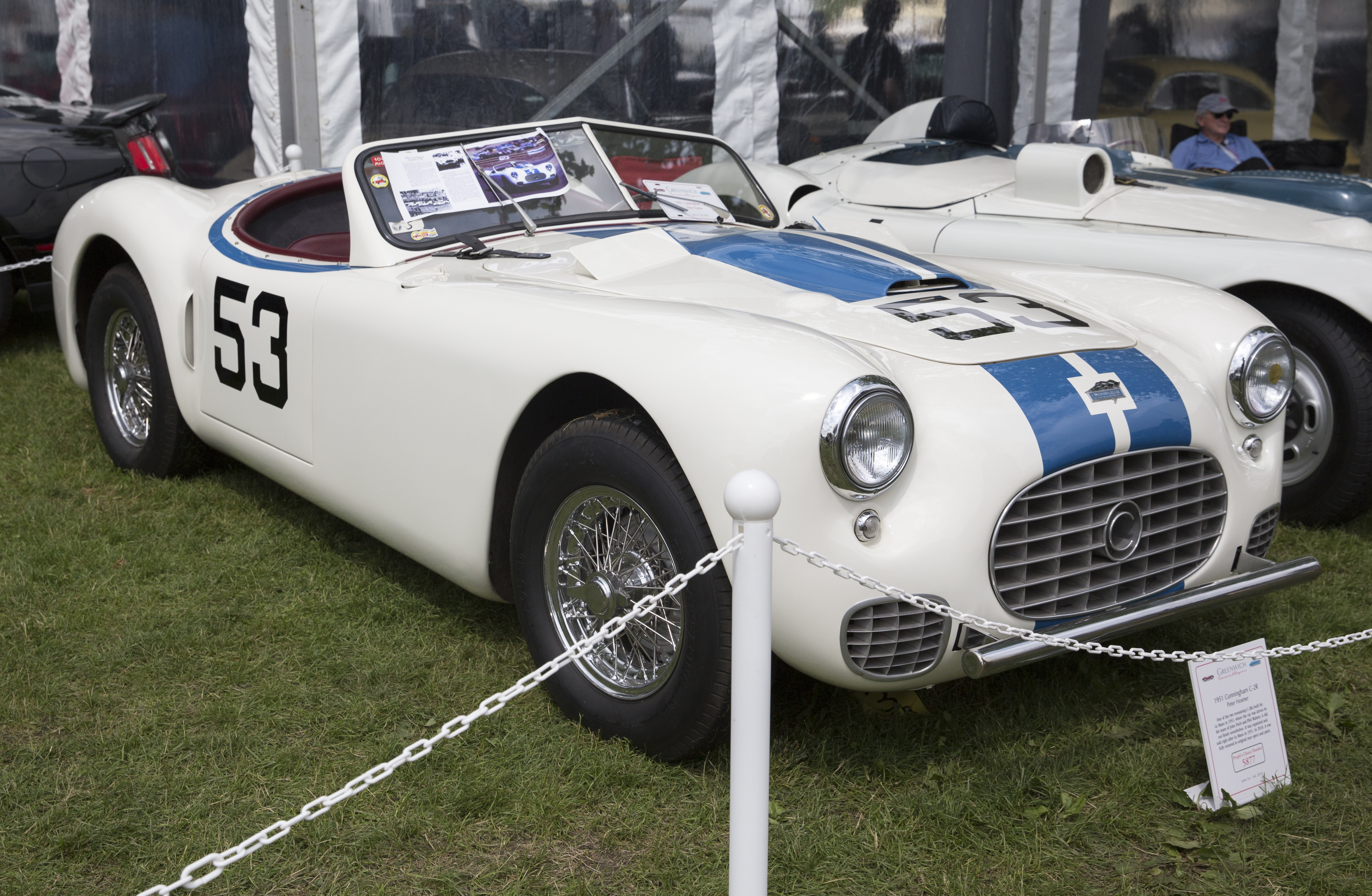
The Cunningham C2-R driven by Wacker in the 1951 24 Hours of Le Mans

Frederick Glade Wacker Jr. (July 10, 1918 Chicago – June 16, 1998) was an engineer and former president of two large Chicago companies. He was also a prominent Chicago socialite, a jazz musician, and a racing driver. He participated in five Formula One World Championship races, debuting on June 21, 1953. He scored no championship points. He also participated in several non-Championship Formula One races.

Wacker was the grandson of Charles H. Wacker, who was the first chairman of the Chicago Plan Commission and the man for whom Wacker Drive in Chicago is named. He attended The Hotchkiss School and Yale University. He worked with AC Spark Plug before enlisting in the United States Navy.

Wacker was involved in a fatal accident during the second lap of the 1952 Watkins Glen Grand Prix, which at the time was a street course. While preparing for a right hand turn, his Allard J2 came dangerously close to a Cunningham driven by John Fitch, and both drivers swerved to avoid a collision. The back end of the Allard came out slightly to the left and closer to a throng of spectators sitting on the curb along the side of the course. Ten people were injured and a seven-year-old boy was killed. The tragedy caused the end of street racing at the Glen and elsewhere in the United States.

== Complete World Championship results ==
(key)

Year	Entrant	Chassis	Engine	1	2	3	4	5	6	7	8	9	WDC	Points
1953	Equipe Gordini	Gordini Type 16	Gordini Straight-6	ARG	500	NED; DNS	BEL; 9	FRA	GBR	GER	SUI; DNS	ITA	NC	0
1954	Equipe Gordini	Gordini Type 16	Gordini Straight-6	ARG	500	BEL	FRA	GBR	GER	SUI; Ret	ITA; 6	ESP; DNA	NC	0
