= Jorge Daponte =

Argentine racing driver (1923–1963)

- Born: Jorge Alberto Daponte; 5 June 1923; Buenos Aires, Argentina
- Died: 9 March 1963 (aged 39); Buenos Aires, Argentina

Formula One World Championship career
- Nationality: (Argentina) Argentine
- Active years: 1953-1954
- Team: privateer Maserati
- Entries: 3 (2 starts)
- Championships: 0
- Wins: 0
- Podiums: 0
- Career points: 0
- Pole positions: 0
- Fastest laps: 0
- First entry: 1953 Indianapolis 500
- Last entry: 1954 Italian Grand Prix

Jorge Alberto Daponte (5 June 1923 – 9 March 1963) was a racing driver from Argentina.

Daponte was born in Buenos Aires. He participated in two World Championship Formula One Grands Prix, appearing for the first time on 17 January 1954, and scoring no championship points. He also participated in several non-Championship races. He died at 39 years of age, possibly of suicide.

== Complete Formula One World Championship results ==
(key)

Year	Entrant	Chassis	Engine	1	2	3	4	5	6	7	8	9	WDC	Points
1953	Wayne	Johnson	Wayne Straight-6	ARG	500; DNQ	NED	BEL	FRA	GBR	GER	SUI	ITA	NC	0
1954	Jorge Daponte	Maserati A6GCM/250F	Maserati Straight-6	ARG; Ret	500	BEL	FRA	GBR	GER	SUI	ITA; NC	ESP	NC	0
