= Giovanni de Riu =

Italian racing driver (1925–2008)

- Born: 10 March 1925; Macomer, Sardinia
- Died: 11 December 2008 (aged 83); Stresa, Piedmont

Formula One World Championship career
- Nationality: (Italy) Italian
- Active years: 1954
- Team: privateer Maserati
- Entries: 1 (0 starts)
- Championships: 0
- Wins: 0
- Podiums: 0
- Career points: 0
- Pole positions: 0
- Fastest laps: 0
- First entry: 1954 Italian Grand Prix

Giovanni de Riu (10 March 1925 – 11 December 2008) was a racing driver from Italy. He failed to qualify for the 1954 Italian Grand Prix, with a privately entered Maserati.

== Complete Formula One World Championship results ==
(key)

Year	Entrant	Chassis	Engine	1	2	3	4	5	6	7	8	9	WDC	Points
1954	Giovanni de Riu	Maserati A6GCM/250F	Maserati Straight-6	ARG	500	BEL	FRA	GBR	GER	SUI	ITA; DNQ	ESP; DNA	NC	0
