= 1954 Buenos Aires Grand Prix =

Race details
- Date: 31 January 1954
- Official name: X Gran Premio Ciudad de Buenos Aires
- Location: Argentina
- Course: Permanent racing facility
- Course length: 4.706 km (2.924 mi)
- Distance: 65 laps, 305.89 km (190.07 mi)

Pole position
Driver	(Italy) Giuseppe Farina	Ferrari

Fastest lap
Driver	(Italy) Giuseppe Farina	Ferrari
- Time: 2:22.6

Podium
First	(France) Maurice Trintignant	Ferrari
Second	(Argentina) Roberto Mieres	Maserati
Third	(Argentina) José Froilán González (Italy) Giuseppe Farina	Ferrari

The 10th Gran Premio Ciudad de Buenos Aires was a Formula Libre motor race held on 31 January 1954 at the Autódromo 17 de Octubre in Buenos Aires. The race was won by Maurice Trintignant in the Ecurie Rosier Ferrari 625. Roberto Mieres in a Maserati A6GCM was second and José Froilán González and Giuseppe Farina shared another Ferrari 625 for third, Farina's car having retired earlier. Farina also qualified on pole and set fastest lap.

The event was marred by the death of team owner Enrico Platé, killed when Jorge Daponte's car spun and crashed into the pit lane.

== Classification ==
Pos	No.	Driver	Entrant	Constructor	Time/Retired
1	26	(France) Maurice Trintignant	Ecurie Rosier	Ferrari 625	2:38:36.0
2	32	(Argentina) Roberto Mieres	Roberto Mieres	Maserati A6GCM	+29.4s
3	12	(Argentina) José Froilán González (Italy) Giuseppe Farina	Scuderia Ferrari	Ferrari 625	+37.6s
4	28	(United States) Harry Schell	Harry Schell	Maserati A6GCM	+1:44.5
5	18	(France) Jean Behra	Equipe Gordini	Gordini Type 16	+1:45.4
6	14	(United Kingdom) Mike Hawthorn	Scuderia Ferrari	Ferrari 625	64 laps, engine
7	8	(Thailand) B. Bira	Enrico Platé	Maserati A6GCM	+1 lap
8	16	(Italy) Umberto Maglioli	Scuderia Ferrari	Ferrari 625	+1 lap
9	52	(Argentina) Alfredo Pián	Alfredo Pián	Pián-Ford	+8 laps
10	20	(France) Élie Bayol (France) Roger Loyer	Equipe Gordini	Gordini Type 16	+10 laps
Ret.	4	(Argentina) Onofre Marimón	Officine Alfieri Maserati	Maserati 250F	
Ret.	2	(Argentina) Juan Manuel Fangio	Officine Alfieri Maserati	Maserati 250F	
Ret.	10	(Italy) Giuseppe Farina	Scuderia Ferrari	Ferrari 625	1 lap, transmission
Ret.	38	(Brazil) Francisco Landi	Francisco Landi	Ferrari 375	
Ret.	22	(France) Roger Loyer	Equipe Gordini	Gordini Type 16	
Ret.		(Argentina) Clemar Bucci	Clemar Bucci	Alfa Romeo 12C	
Ret.	34	(Argentina) Jorge Daponte	Jorge Daponte	Maserati A6GCM	Crash
Ret.		(Argentina) Carlos Fortunatti Firpo		Maserati 4CLT	
Ret.	24	(France) Louis Rosier	Ecurie Rosier	Ferrari 500	
Ret.		(Argentina) José Félix López		Ferrari 166	
DNA		(Switzerland) Emmanuel de Graffenried	Enrico Platé	Maserati A6GCM	
