= 1954 Rome Grand Prix =

- Non-championship race in the 1954 Formula One season

Race details
- Date: 6 June 1954
- Official name: XIII Gran Premio di Roma
- Location: Castelfusano, Rome
- Course: Temporary Street Circuit
- Course length: 6.567 km (4.094 miles)
- Distance: 60 laps, 394.01 km (245.64 miles)

Pole position
Driver	(Argentina) Onofre Marimón	Maserati
- Time: 2:15.4

Fastest lap
Driver	(Argentina) Onofre Marimón	Maserati
- Time: 2:15.7

Podium
First	(Argentina) Onofre Marimón	Maserati
Second	(United States) Harry Schell	Maserati
Third	(Italy) Sergio Mantovani	Maserati

The 13th Rome Grand Prix was a non-championship Formula One motor race held on 6 June 1954 on a street circuit in Castelfusano park, Rome, Lazio. The Grand Prix was won by Onofre Marimón in a Maserati 250F. This was his one and only Formula One win. Marimón also took pole position and fastest lap. Harry Schell finished second in a Maserati A6GCM and Sergio Mantovani was third in another Maserati 250F.

== Classification ==
=== Race ===
Pos	No	Driver	Entrant	Car	Time/Retired	Grid
1	16	(Argentina) Onofre Marimón	Officine Alfieri Maserati	Maserati 250F	2:18:49.6, 170.35kph	1
2	14	(United States) Harry Schell	Harry Schell	Maserati A6GCM	+2 laps	6
3	18	(Italy) Sergio Mantovani	Officine Alfieri Maserati	Maserati 250F	+2 laps	8
4	26	(France) André Simon (France) Jean Behra	Equipe Gordini	Gordini T16	+3 laps	5
5	4	(France) Louis Rosier	Equipe Rosier	Ferrari 625	+3 laps	7
NC	10	(United Kingdom) Stirling Moss	A.E. Moss	Maserati 250F	+7 laps, rear drive	3
Ret	2	(France) Robert Manzon	Equipe Rosier	Ferrari 625	40 laps, water loss	2
Ret	20	(Italy) Luigi Musso	Officine Alfieri Maserati	Maserati 250F	31 laps, engine	10
Ret	24	(France) Jean Behra	Equipe Gordini	Gordini T16	15 laps, stub axle	4
Ret	12	(Argentina) Roberto Mieres	Roberto Mieres	Maserati A6GCM	12 laps, connecting rod	9
Ret	34	(Italy) Berardo Taraschi	Berardo Taraschi	Giaur-Giannini-Fiat	5 laps, engine	12
Ret	8	(Italy) Giovanni de Riu	Giovanni de Riu	Maserati A6GCM	3 laps	11
Ret	30	(Italy) Fabrizio Serena	Fabrizio Serena	Ferrari 125	1 lap	14
Ret	32	(Italy) Carlo Mancini	Carlo Mancini	Ferrari 166	0 laps	15
DNS	28	(Italy) Guido Mancini	Guido Mancini	Ferrari 500	-	13
DNA	6	(Italy) Alberto Ascari	SpA Lancia	Lancia D50	car not ready	-
DNA	22	(Argentina) Juan Manuel Fangio	Officine Alfieri Maserati	Maserati 250F	driver not available^{1}	-
DNA	36	(Argentina) José Froilán González	Scuderia Ferrari	Ferrari 625	car not ready	-
DNA	38	(France) Maurice Trintignant	Scuderia Ferrari	Ferrari 625	car not ready	-
DNA	40	(Italy) Umberto Maglioli	Scuderia Ferrari	Ferrari 625	car not ready	-
DNA	42	(United Kingdom) Paul Emery	Emeryson Cars Ltd.	Emeryson Mk.1-Alta	car & driver elsewhere	-

^{1}Mercedes-Benz had contracted Fangio to drive for them once their car was ready. Until then he was allowed to drive for Maserati, but only in World Championship races.

Previous race: 1954 Curtis Trophy	Formula One non-championship races 1954 season	Next race: 1954 Grand Prix des Frontières
Previous race: 1951 Rome Grand Prix	Rome Grand Prix	Next race: 1956 Rome Grand Prix
