= Umberto Maglioli =

Italian racing driver (1928–1999)

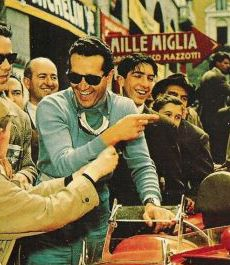
- Maglioli at the 1954 Mille Miglia
- Born: 5 June 1928; Bioglio, Piedmont, Kingdom of Italy
- Died: 7 February 1999 (aged 70); Monza, Lombardy, Italy

Formula One World Championship career
- Nationality: (Italy) Italian
- Active years: 1953–1957
- Team(s): Ferrari, Maserati, Porsche
- Entries: 10
- Championships: 0
- Wins: 0
- Podiums: 2
- Career points: 3 1/3
- Pole positions: 0
- Fastest laps: 0
- First entry: 1953 Italian Grand Prix
- Last entry: 1957 German Grand Prix

Umberto Maglioli (5 June 1928 – 7 February 1999) was an Italian racing driver, who competed in Formula One at 10 Grands Prix from 1953 to 1957. In endurance racing, Maglioli was a three-time winner of the Targa Florio.

Maglioli participated in ten Grands Prix with Ferrari, Maserati, and Porsche. He achieved two podiums, and scored 3 1/3 championship points. He participated in the Targa Florio race nineteen times, winning it three times, and the Mille Miglia ten times, with the best result being a second place in the Lancia Aurelia B20 GT in 1951.

== Life and career ==
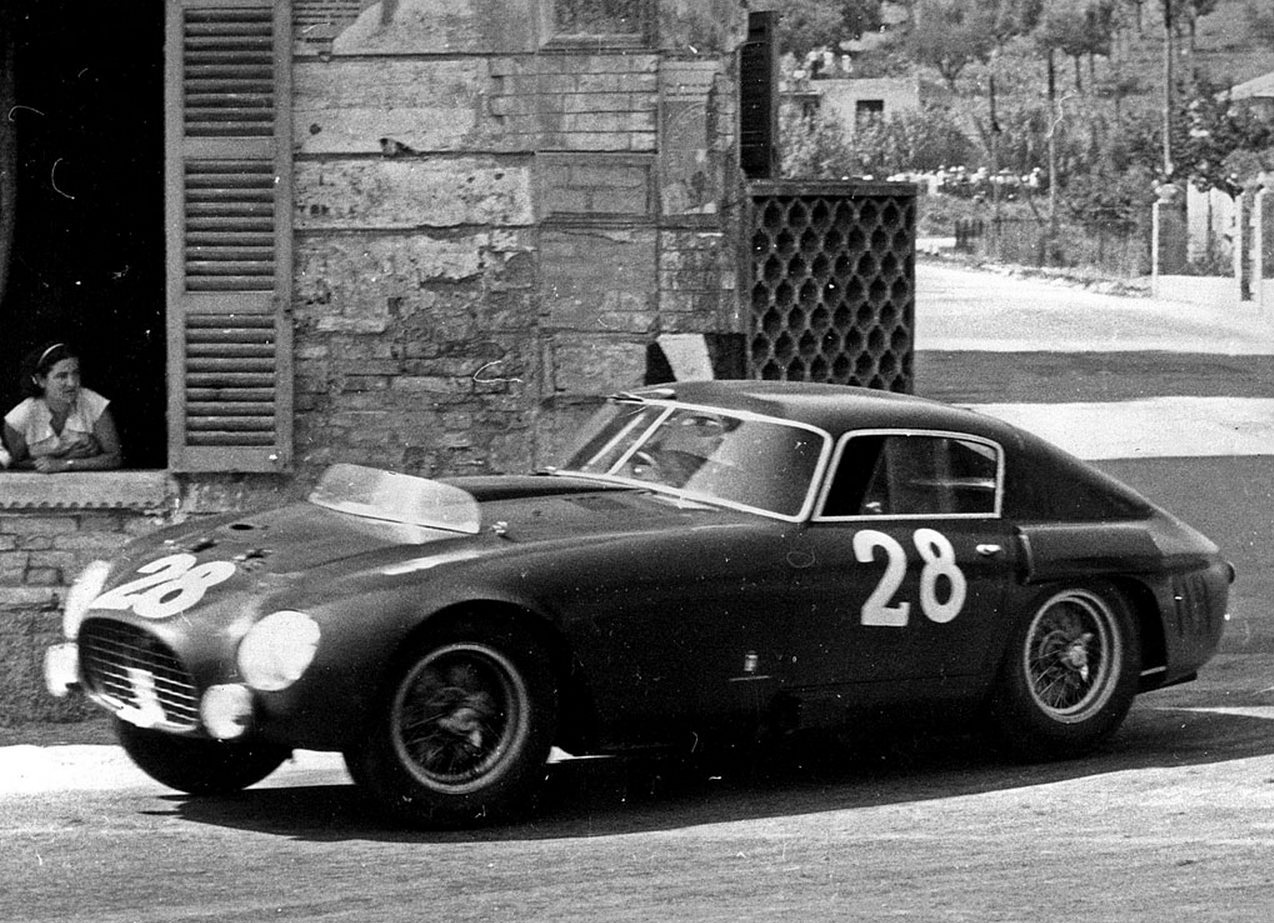
Mike Hawthorn and Umberto Maglioli in the #28 Ferrari 340/375 MM at the 2nd Pescara GP on Aug 16, 1953. This is chassis #0320AM.

Born in Bioglio, Vercelli, he was introduced to racing by Giovanni Bracco and accompanied him on several Mille Miglias and Targa Florios. In 1953, he won the Targa (single-handed) for the first time, in a Lancia D20, and also the Pescara 12hr race, driving a Ferrari 375 MM with Mike Hawthorn. Maglioli also won the last Carrera Panamericana in 1954, driving a Ferrari 375 Plus. The same year he also won the 1000 km Buenos Aires driving the Ferrari 375 MM with Giuseppe Farina and the 1000Km Supercortemaggiore at Monza, again with Hawthorn, this time driving a Ferrari 735 S. His Ferrari 750 Monza won the 1955 non-championship road race at Mugello, but he failed to finish the 1955 Targa Florio due to a lost wheel. Maglioli left Scuderia Ferrari at the end of the season.

Maglioli joined Porsche in 1956 and won the Targa Florio, again single-handed. In 1957, under established rules which allowed F2 cars to enter Grand Prix, Porsche entered two 550RSs for the German Grand Prix, one driven by Maglioli and the other by Edgar Barth. Maglioli though failed to finish. Later that year he crashed his Porsche during the Gaisburg hillclimb in Austria. He recuperated in a hospital in Salzburg with leg injuries so severe that doctors initially feared he may not walk again.

In 1964, Maglioli won the Sebring 12hrs for Ferrari and in 1968 scored his third Targa victory (this time with Vic Elford) in a works Porsche 907. In 1970, he entered his final Targa Florio driving a Alfa Romeo T33/3, but he failed to complete a lap and never raced again.

Immediately after retiring from motor racing, he went into business, purchasing Swiss watchmaker Orfina. The company in 1972 collaborated with Porsche Design, headed by Ferdinand Alexander, to produce the Chronograph One wristwatch. The Quartz crisis meant the production run ended only after a couple of years, however the watch went on to be worn by Mario Andretti and Gianni Agnelli amongst others. After Hans Rüefli resigned from the board and the death of Roland Rüefli, Maglioli became the Chairman of the company until its liquidation in 1995. He died in Monza in 1999.

== Racing record ==
=== Complete Formula One World Championship results ===
(key)

Year	Entrant	Chassis	Engine	1	2	3	4	5	6	7	8	9	WDC	Points
1953	Scuderia Ferrari	Ferrari 553	Ferrari Straight-4	ARG	500	NED	BEL	FRA	GBR	GER	SUI	ITA; 8	NC	0
1954	Scuderia Ferrari	Ferrari 625	Ferrari Straight-4	ARG; 9	500	BEL	FRA	GBR	GER		ITA; 3 *	ESP	18th	2
1954	Scuderia Ferrari	Ferrari 553	Ferrari Straight-4							SUI; 7			18th	2
1955	Scuderia Ferrari	Ferrari 625	Ferrari Straight-4	ARG; 3 †	MON	500	BEL	NED	GBR				21st	1 1/3
1955	Scuderia Ferrari	Ferrari 555	Ferrari Straight-4							ITA; 6			21st	1 1/3
1956	Scuderia Guastalla	Maserati 250F	Maserati Straight-6	ARG	MON	500	BEL	FRA	GBR; Ret				NC	0
1956	Officine Alfieri Maserati	Maserati 250F	Maserati Straight-6							GER; Ret	ITA; Ret ‡		NC	0
1957	Dr Ing F Porsche KG	Porsche 550RS F2	Porsche Flat-4	ARG	MON	500	FRA	GBR	GER; Ret	PES	ITA		NC	0

* Indicates Shared Drive with José Froilán González
† Indicates Shared Drive with Giuseppe Farina and Maurice Trintignant
‡ Indicates Shared Drive with Jean Behra

=== Non-Championship results ===
(key) (Races in bold indicate pole position) (Races in italics indicate fastest lap)

Year	Entrant	Chassis	Engine	1	2	3	4	5	6	7	8	9	10	11	12	13	14	15	16	17	18	19	20	21	22	23	24	25
1954	Scuderia Ferrari	Ferrari 625	Ferrari I4	SYR	PAU	LAV	BOR	INT; Ret	BAR; 7	CUR	ROM; DNA	FRO	COR	BRC	CRY	ROU	CAE	AUG	COR	OUL	RED	PES; DNS	SAC	JOE	CAD	BER	GOO	DAI
1957	Umberto Maglioli	Porsche RSK	Porsche 547/3 1.5 F4	BUE	SYR	PAU	GLV	NAP; NC	RMS	CAE	INT	MOD	MOR															
