= 1954 Italian Grand Prix =

← Previous race	Next race →
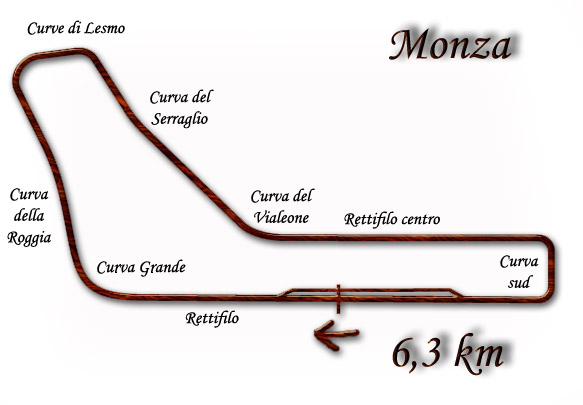
- Autodromo Nazionale di Monza layout

Race details
- Date: 5 September 1954
- Official name: XXV Gran Premio d'Italia
- Location: Autodromo Nazionale di Monza, Monza, Italy
- Course: Permanent road course
- Course length: 6.300 km (3.915 miles)
- Distance: 80 laps, 504.000 km (313.171 miles)
- Weather: Sunny, mild, dry

Pole position
Driver	(Argentina) Juan Manuel Fangio	Mercedes
- Time: 1:59.0

Fastest lap
Driver	(Argentina) José Froilán González	Ferrari
- Time: 2:00.8 on lap 2

Podium
First	(Argentina) Juan Manuel Fangio	Mercedes
Second	(United Kingdom) Mike Hawthorn	Ferrari
Third	(Italy) Umberto Maglioli; (Argentina) José Froilán González	Ferrari

The 1954 Italian Grand Prix was a Formula One motor race held on 5 September 1954 at Monza. It was race 8 of 9 in the 1954 World Championship of Drivers. The 80-lap race was won by Mercedes driver Juan Manuel Fangio after he started from pole position. Mike Hawthorn finished second for the Ferrari team and his teammates Umberto Maglioli and José Froilán González came in third.

Among the spectators at this race was 14-year-old future Indianapolis 500 winner and Formula 1 World Champion Mario Andretti.

== Entries ==
Team	No	Driver	Car	Engine	Tyre
(Italy) Giovanni de Riu	2	(Italy) Giovanni de Riu	Maserati A6GCM	Maserati A6 2.0 L6	P
(France) Ecurie Rosier	6	(France) Robert Manzon	Ferrari 625 F1	Ferrari 625 2.5 L4	P
(Argentina) Jorge Daponte	8	(Argentina) Jorge Daponte	Maserati A6GCM	Maserati A6 2.0 L6	P
(United Kingdom) Vandervell Products	10	(United Kingdom) Peter Collins	Vanwall	Vanwall 254 2.5 L4	P
(Germany) Daimler Benz AG	12	(Germany) Hans Herrmann	Mercedes-Benz W196 (Open-wheel)	Mercedes M196 2.5 L8	C
(Germany) Daimler Benz AG	14	(Germany) Karl Kling	Mercedes-Benz W196 (Streamliner)	Mercedes M196 2.5 L8	C
(Germany) Daimler Benz AG	16	(Argentina) Juan Manuel Fangio	Mercedes-Benz W196 (Streamliner)	Mercedes M196 2.5 L8	C
(Italy) Officine Alfieri Maserati	18	(Italy) Sergio Mantovani	Maserati 250F Maserati A6GCM	Maserati 250F1 2.5 L6 Maserati A6 2.0 L6	P
(Italy) Officine Alfieri Maserati	20	(Italy) Luigi Musso	Maserati 250F Maserati A6GCM	Maserati 250F1 2.5 L6 Maserati A6 2.0 L6	P
(Italy) Officine Alfieri Maserati	22	(Italy) Luigi Villoresi	Maserati 250F Maserati A6GCM	Maserati 250F1 2.5 L6 Maserati A6 2.0 L6	P
(Italy) Officine Alfieri Maserati	24	(Argentina) Roberto Mieres	Maserati 250F Maserati A6GCM	Maserati 250F1 2.5 L6 Maserati A6 2.0 L6	P
(Italy) Officine Alfieri Maserati	26	(France) Louis Rosier	Maserati 250F Maserati A6GCM	Maserati 250F1 2.5 L6 Maserati A6 2.0 L6	P
(Italy) Officine Alfieri Maserati	28	(United Kingdom) Stirling Moss	Maserati 250F Maserati A6GCM	Maserati 250F1 2.5 L6 Maserati A6 2.0 L6	P
(Italy) Scuderia Ferrari	30	(France) Maurice Trintignant	Ferrari 553 Ferrari 625 F1	Ferrari 554 2.5 L4 Ferrari 625 2.5 L4	P
(Italy) Scuderia Ferrari	32	(Argentina) José Froilán González	Ferrari 553 Ferrari 625 F1	Ferrari 554 2.5 L4 Ferrari 625 2.5 L4	P
(Italy) Scuderia Ferrari	34	(Italy) Alberto Ascari	Ferrari 553 Ferrari 625 F1	Ferrari 554 2.5 L4 Ferrari 625 2.5 L4	P
(Italy) Scuderia Ferrari	38	(Italy) Umberto Maglioli	Ferrari 553 Ferrari 625 F1	Ferrari 554 2.5 L4 Ferrari 625 2.5 L4	P
(Italy) Scuderia Ferrari	40	(United Kingdom) Mike Hawthorn	Ferrari 553 Ferrari 625 F1	Ferrari 554 2.5 L4 Ferrari 625 2.5 L4	P
(France) Equipe Gordini	42	(United States) Fred Wacker	Gordini T16	Gordini 23 2.5 L6	E
(France) Equipe Gordini	44	(France) Jean Behra	Gordini T16	Gordini 23 2.5 L6	E
(France) Equipe Gordini	46	(Argentina) Clemar Bucci	Gordini T16	Gordini 23 2.5 L6	E

== Classification ==
=== Qualifying ===
Pos	No	Driver	Constructor	Time	Gap
1	16	(Argentina) Juan Manuel Fangio	Mercedes	1:59.0	—
2	34	(Italy) Alberto Ascari	Ferrari	1:59.2	+ 0.2
3	28	(United Kingdom) Stirling Moss	Maserati	1:59.3	+ 0.3
4	14	(Germany) Karl Kling	Mercedes	1:59.6	+ 0.6
5	32	(Argentina) José Froilán González	Ferrari	2:00.0	+ 1.0
6	22	(Italy) Luigi Villoresi	Maserati	2:00.2	+ 1.2
7	40	(United Kingdom) Mike Hawthorn	Ferrari	2:00.2	+ 1.2
8	12	(Germany) Hans Herrmann	Mercedes	2:01.4	+ 2.4
9	18	(Italy) Sergio Mantovani	Maserati	2:01.6	+ 2.6
10	24	(Argentina) Roberto Mieres	Maserati	2:01.7	+ 2.7
11	30	(France) Maurice Trintignant	Ferrari	2:02.3	+ 3.3
12	44	(France) Jean Behra	Gordini	2:02.4	+ 3.4
13	38	(Italy) Umberto Maglioli	Ferrari	2:03.5	+ 4.5
14	20	(Italy) Luigi Musso	Maserati	2:03.5	+ 4.5
15	6	(France) Robert Manzon	Ferrari	2:04.7	+ 5.7
16	10	(United Kingdom) Peter Collins	Vanwall	2:05.2	+ 6.2
17	46	(Argentina) Clemar Bucci	Gordini	2:05.5	+ 6.5
18	42	(United States) Fred Wacker	Gordini	2:08.0	+ 9.0
19	8	(Argentina) Jorge Daponte	Maserati	2:09.5	+ 10.5
20	26	(France) Louis Rosier	Maserati	2:11.0	+ 12.0
DNQ	2	(Italy) Giovanni de Riu	Maserati	3:47.9	+ 1:48.9

=== Race ===
Pos	No	Driver	Constructor	Laps	Time/Retired	Grid	Points
1	16	(Argentina) Juan Manuel Fangio	Mercedes	80	2:47:47.9	1	8
2	40	(United Kingdom) Mike Hawthorn	Ferrari	79	+1 Lap	7	6
3	38	(Italy) Umberto Maglioli (Argentina) José Froilán González	Ferrari	78	+2 Laps	13	2; 3^{1}
4	12	(Germany) Hans Herrmann	Mercedes	77	+3 Laps	8	3
5	30	(France) Maurice Trintignant	Ferrari	75	+5 Laps	11	2
6	42	(United States) Fred Wacker	Gordini	75	+5 Laps	18	
7	10	(United Kingdom) Peter Collins	Vanwall	75	+5 Laps	16	
8	26	(France) Louis Rosier	Maserati	74	+6 Laps	20	
9	18	(Italy) Sergio Mantovani	Maserati	74	+6 Laps	9	
10	28	(United Kingdom) Stirling Moss	Maserati	71	+9 Laps	3	
11	8	(Argentina) Jorge Daponte	Maserati	70	+10 Laps	19	
Ret	34	(Italy) Alberto Ascari	Ferrari	48	Engine	2	
Ret	22	(Italy) Luigi Villoresi	Maserati	42	Clutch	6	
Ret	14	(Germany) Karl Kling	Mercedes	36	Accident	4	
Ret	24	(Argentina) Roberto Mieres	Maserati	34	Suspension	10	
Ret	20	(Italy) Luigi Musso	Maserati	32	Transmission	14	
Ret	32	(Argentina) José Froilán González	Ferrari	16	Gearbox	5	
Ret	6	(France) Robert Manzon	Ferrari	16	Engine	15	
Ret	46	(Argentina) Clemar Bucci	Gordini	13	Transmission	17	
Ret	44	(France) Jean Behra	Gordini	2	Engine	12	
DNQ	2	(Italy) Giovanni de Riu	Maserati		Did not qualify		

Notes

- ^1 – Includes 1 point for fastest lap

== Shared drive ==
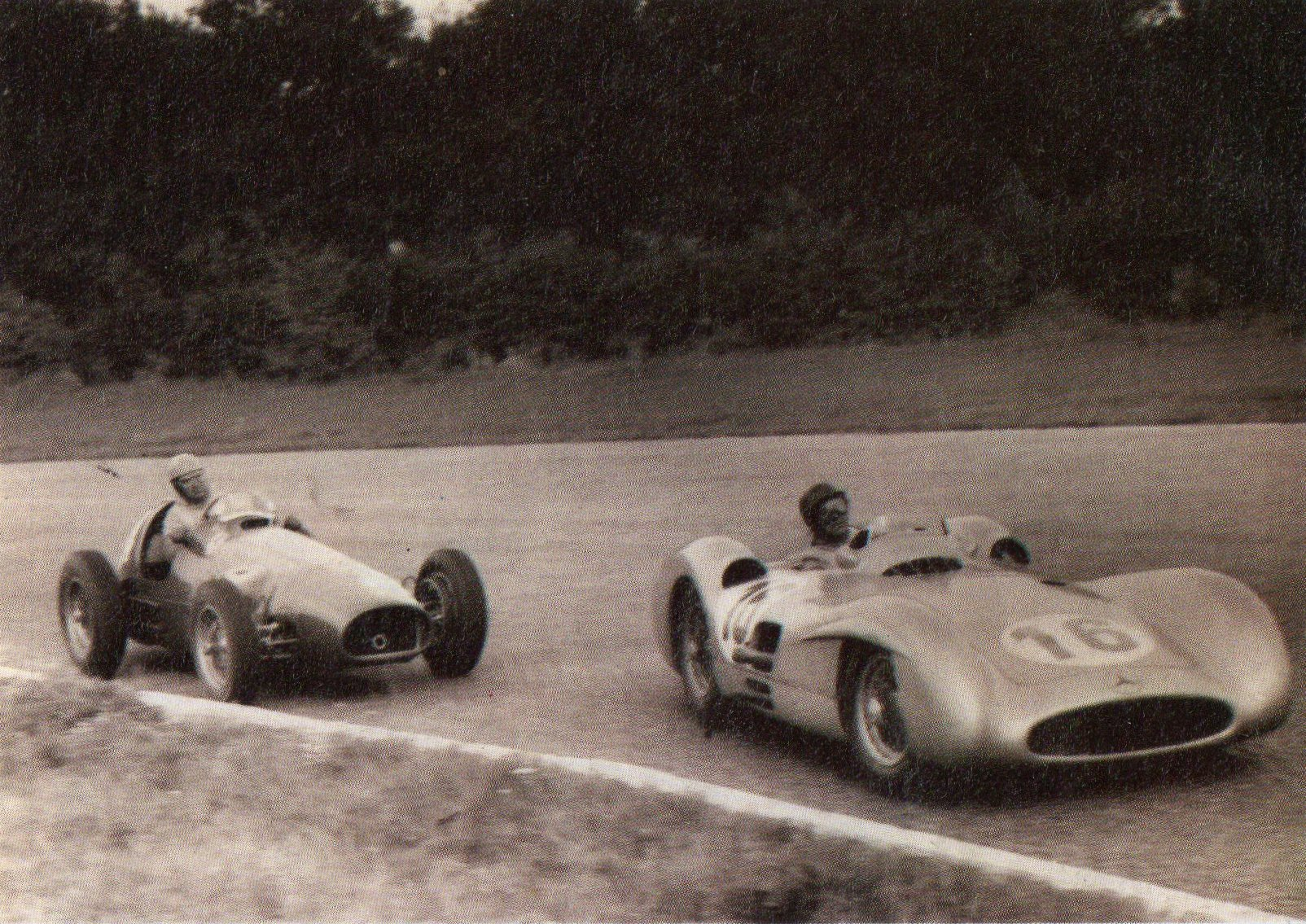
Juan Manuel Fangio in a Mercedes leads Alberto Ascari in a Ferrari.

- Shared Drives: Car #38: Umberto Maglioli (30 laps) and José Froilán González (48 laps)

== Championship standings after the race ==
- **Bold text** indicates the World Champion.

Drivers' Championship standings

Pos	Driver	Points
1	(Argentina) **Juan Manuel Fangio**	42 (53 1/7)
2	(Argentina) José Froilán González	25 1/7 (26 9/14)
3	(France) Maurice Trintignant	17
4	(United Kingdom) Mike Hawthorn	16 9/14
5	(Germany) Karl Kling	10

- Note: Only the top five positions are included. Only the best 5 results counted towards the Championship. Numbers without parentheses are Championship points; numbers in parentheses are total points scored.

Previous race: 1954 Swiss Grand Prix	FIA Formula One World Championship; 1954 season	Next race: 1954 Spanish Grand Prix
Previous race: 1953 Italian Grand Prix	Italian Grand Prix	Next race: 1955 Italian Grand Prix
