= List of Formula One World Drivers' Champions =

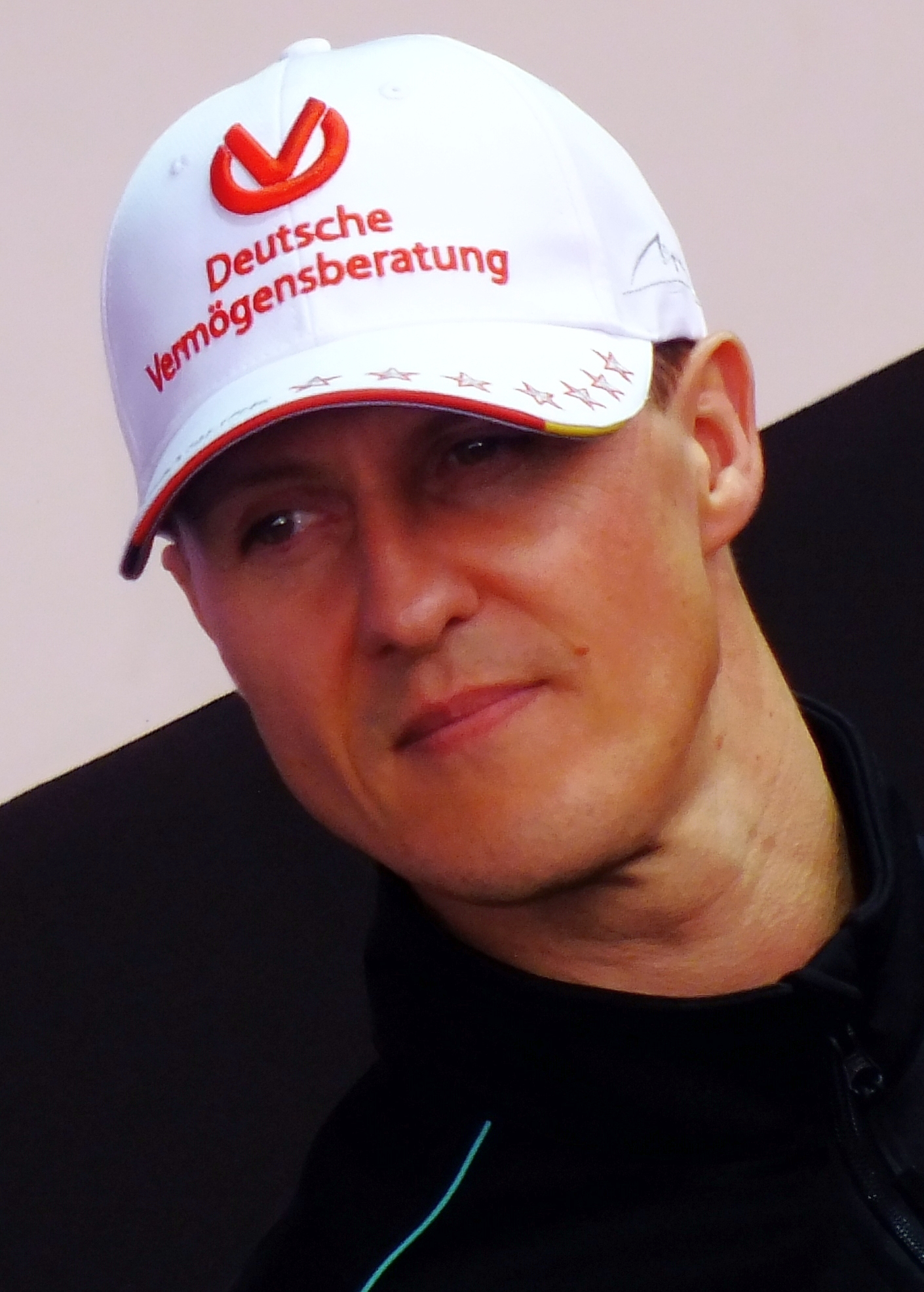
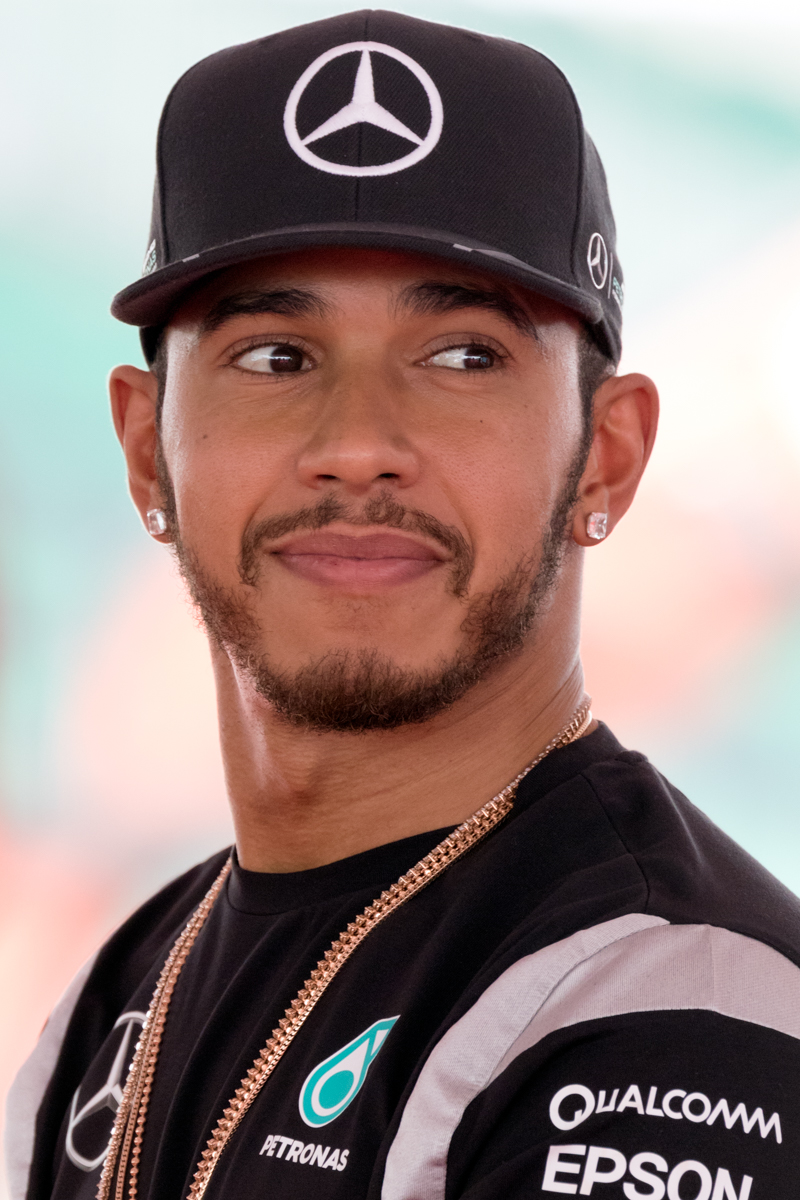
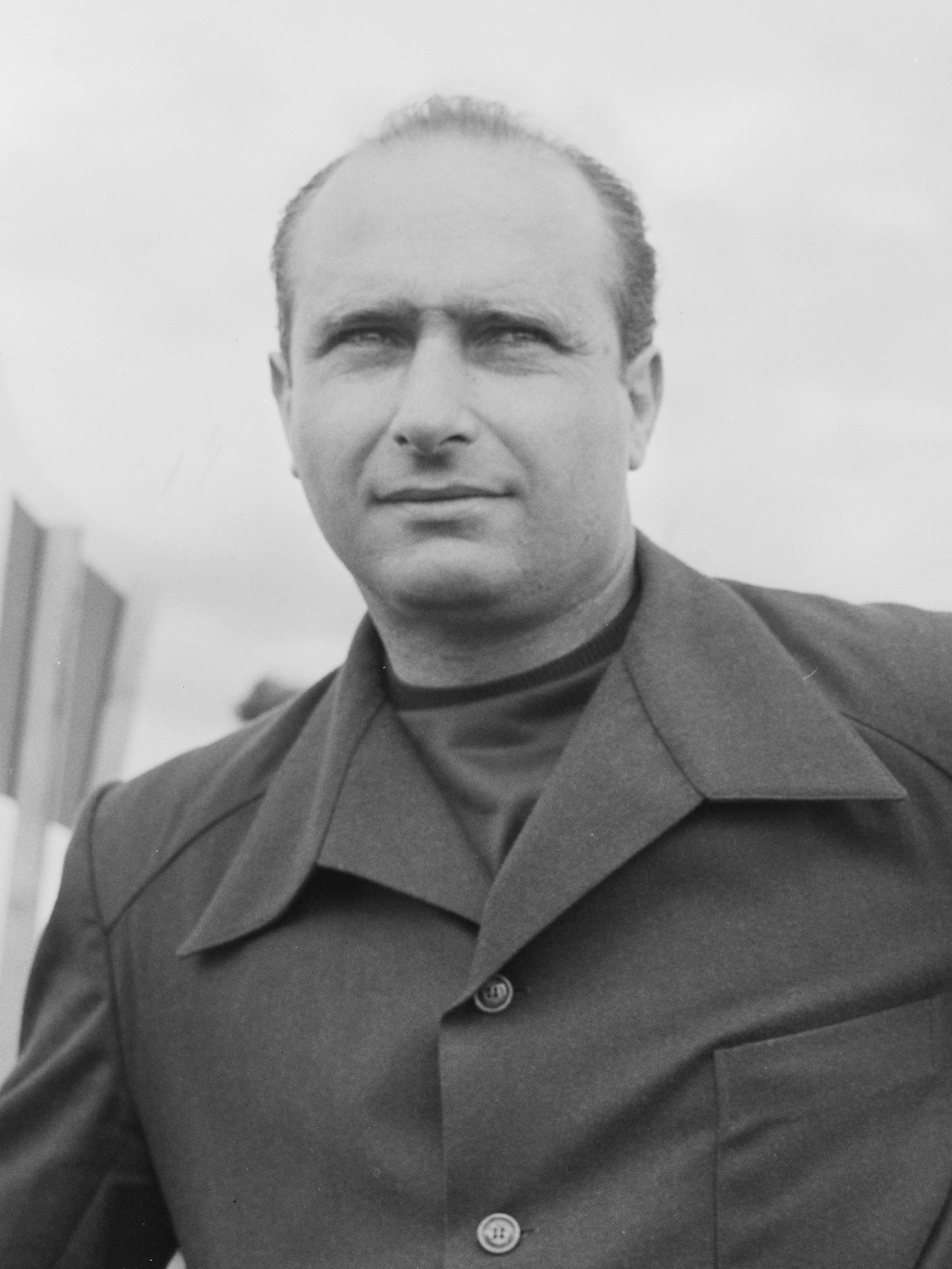
Michael Schumacher (top left) and Lewis Hamilton (top right) have each won the championship a record seven times during their careers. Kimi Antonelli (bottom left) is the current World Drivers' Champion, having won the 2026 title; he also holds the record for being the youngest World Drivers' Champion, having won the 2026 Formula One World Championship at 20 years and 68 days old. Juan Manuel Fangio (bottom right) is the oldest champion, having won the 1957 Formula One World Championship at 46 years and 41 days old.

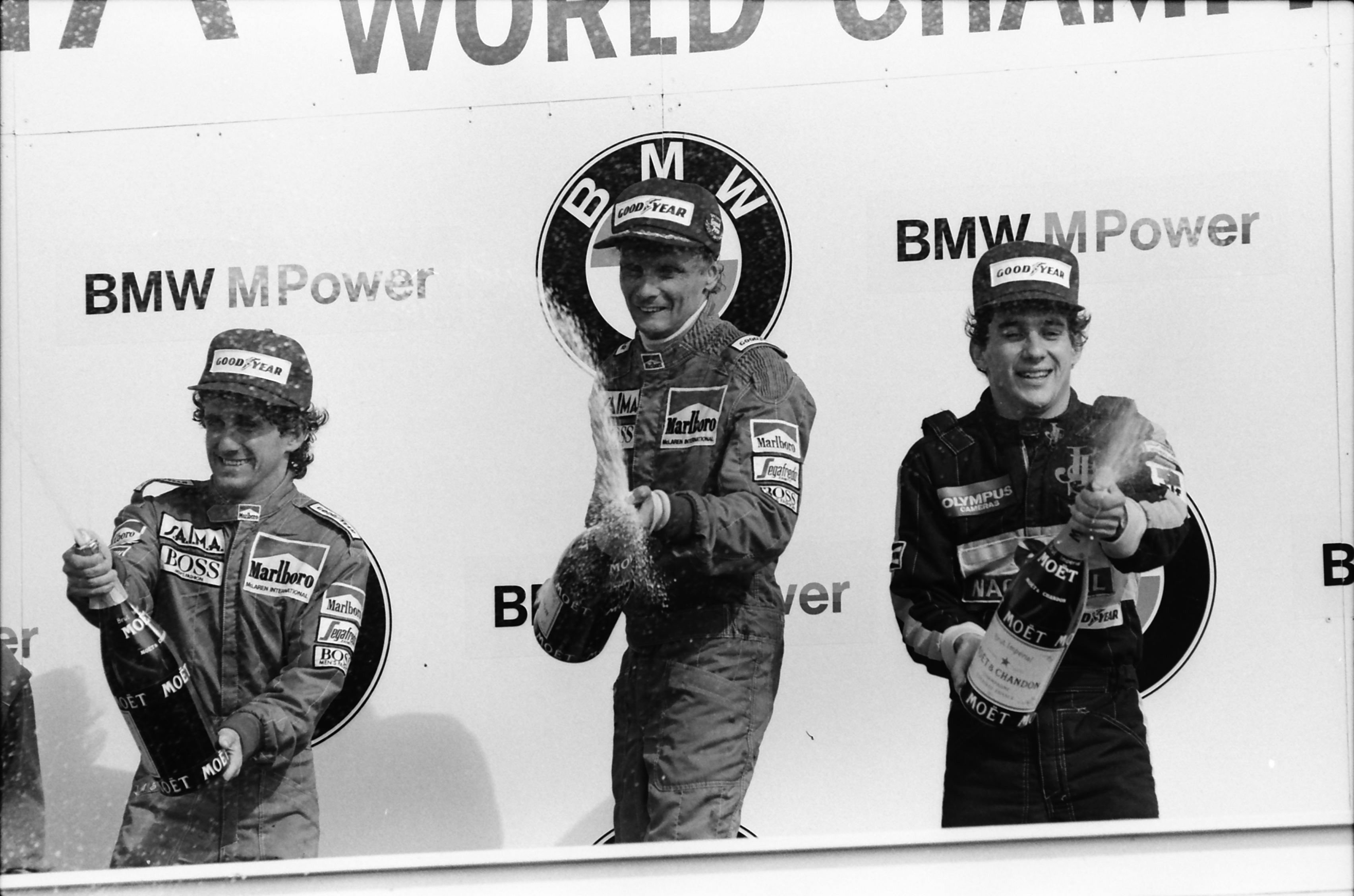
Alain Prost, Niki Lauda and Ayrton Senna, three World Drivers' Champions, commemorating the podium of the 1985 Dutch Grand Prix

The World Drivers' Championship is presented by the Fédération Internationale de l'Automobile (FIA), motorsport's world governing body, to the most successful driver over the course of the season of Formula One races, through a points system based on individual race results. The World Championship is awarded at the FIA Prize Giving Ceremony after the season.

Michael Schumacher and Lewis Hamilton hold the record for the most World Drivers' championships—seven—trailed by Juan Manuel Fangio with five. Schumacher holds the record for the most consecutive titles: five, from the 2000 to 2004 seasons. Nigel Mansell competed in the most seasons before winning the title: 13; he entered Formula One in 1980 and won the title in 1992. Nico Rosberg has the highest number of Grand Prix starts before winning his first title: 206, from the 2006 Bahrain and the 2016 Abu Dhabi Grand Prix. Kimi Antonelli is the youngest champion; he was 20 years and 68 days old when he won in 2026. Juan Manuel Fangio is the oldest; he was 46 years and 41 days old when he won the 1957 title.

As of the 2026 season, the 77 titles have been won by 36 of the 783 drivers who have started a Grand Prix. The first champion was Giuseppe Farina, in 1950; the current title holder is Antonelli in the 2026 season. The title has been won by 11 drivers from the United Kingdom a total of 21 times, more than any other nation, followed by Brazil, Finland, Germany and Italy with three drivers each. The title has been won by drivers from Scuderia Ferrari 15 times between 9 drivers, more than any other team, followed by McLaren with 13 titles between 8 drivers. The championship has been won in the final race of the season 31 times in the 76 seasons it has been awarded. Schumacher won the championship with six races left in a season, a record: the 2002 title at that year's French Grand Prix. The points system has twice crowned a champion—John Surtees in 1964 and Ayrton Senna in 1988—who scored fewer points overall than the driver who finished second. Max Verstappen won the 2023 title with 290 points more than the second-place Sergio Pérez, a record, while Niki Lauda won the 1984 title with the closest gap: 0.5 points over Alain Prost. All champions won titles driving cars entered by works teams of respective constructors except for Jackie Stewart in 1969 who won a title driving a car entered by a privateer team. Only one driver—Jack Brabham in 1966—won a title in a car of his own construction.

== By season ==
Key
Bold	indicates the constructor also won the Constructors' Championship (awarded since 1958)

World Drivers' Champions by season
Season	Driver	Age	Constructor		Tyres	Poles	Wins	Podiums	Fastest laps	Points	% Points	Clinched	# of rounds remaining	Margin	% Margin
Season	Driver	Age	Chassis	Engine	Tyres	Poles	Wins	Podiums	Fastest laps	Points	% Points	Clinched	# of rounds remaining	Margin	% Margin
1950	(Italy) Giuseppe Farina	43	(Italy) Alfa Romeo	Alfa Romeo	**P**	2	3	3	3	30	83.333 (47.619)	Round 7 of 7	0	3	10.000
1951	(Argentina) Juan Manuel Fangio	40	(Italy) Alfa Romeo	Alfa Romeo	**P**	4	3	5	5	31	86.111 (51.389)	Round 8 of 8	0	6	19.355
1952 (Note: The 1952 and 1953 season were run to Formula Two regulations.)	(Italy) Alberto Ascari	34	(Italy) Ferrari	Ferrari	**F** **P**	5	6	6	6	36	100.000 (74.306)	Round 6 of 8	2	12	33.333
1953	(Italy) Alberto Ascari	35	(Italy) Ferrari	Ferrari	**P**	6	5	5	4	34.5	95.833 (57.407)	Round 8 of 9	1	6.5	18.841
1954	(Argentina) Juan Manuel Fangio	43	(Italy) Maserati	Maserati	**P**	5	6	7	3	42	93.333 (70.547)	Round 7 of 9	2	16.857	40.136
1954	(Argentina) Juan Manuel Fangio	43	(Germany) Mercedes	Mercedes	**C**	5	6	7	3	42	93.333 (70.547)	Round 7 of 9	2	16.857	40.136
1955	(Argentina) Juan Manuel Fangio	44	(Germany) Mercedes	Mercedes	**C**	3	4	5	3	40	88.889 (65.079)	Round 6 of 7	1	16.5	41.250
1956	(Argentina) Juan Manuel Fangio	45	(Italy) Ferrari	Ferrari	**E**	6	3	5	4	30	66.667 (45.833)	Round 8 of 8	0	3	10.000
1957	(Argentina) Juan Manuel Fangio	46	(Italy) Maserati	Maserati	**P**	4	4	6	2	40	88.889 (63.889)	Round 6 of 8	2	15	37.500
1958	(United Kingdom) Mike Hawthorn	29	(Italy) Ferrari	Ferrari	**E**	4	1	7	5	42	77.778 (49.495)	Round 11 of 11	0	1	2.381
1959	(Australia) Jack Brabham	33	(United Kingdom) **Cooper**	**Climax**	**D**	1	2	5	1	31	68.889 (41.975)	Round 9 of 9	0	4	12.903
1960	(Australia) Jack Brabham	34	(United Kingdom) **Cooper**	**Climax**	**D**	3	5	5	3	43	89.583 (53.750)	Round 8 of 10	2	9	20.930
1961	(United States) Phil Hill	34	(Italy) **Ferrari**	**Ferrari**	**D**	5	2	6	2	34	75.556 (52.778)	Round 7 of 8	1	1	2.941
1962	(United Kingdom) Graham Hill	33	(United Kingdom) **BRM**	**BRM**	**D**	1	4	6	3	42	93.333 (64.198)	Round 9 of 9	0	12	28.571
1963	(United Kingdom) Jim Clark	27	(United Kingdom) **Lotus**	**Climax**	**D**	7	7	9	6	54	100.000 (81.111)	Round 7 of 10	3	21	38.889
1964	(United Kingdom) John Surtees	30	(Italy) **Ferrari**	**Ferrari**	**D**	2	2	6	2	40	74.074 (44.444)	Round 10 of 10	0	1	2.500
1965	(United Kingdom) Jim Clark	29	(United Kingdom) **Lotus**	**Climax**	**D**	6	6	6	6	54	100.000 (60.000)	Round 7 of 10	3	14	25.926
1966	(Australia) Jack Brabham	40	(United Kingdom) **Brabham**	**Repco**	**G**	3	4	5	1	42	93.333 (55.556)	Round 7 of 9	2	14	33.333
1967	(New Zealand) Denny Hulme	31	(United Kingdom) **Brabham**	**Repco**	**G**	0	2	8	2	51	62.963 (51.515)	Round 11 of 11	0	5	9.804
1968	(United Kingdom) Graham Hill	39	(United Kingdom) **Lotus**	**Ford**	**F**	2	3	6	0	48	53.333 (44.444)	Round 12 of 12	0	12	25.000
1969	(United Kingdom) Jackie Stewart	30	(France) **Matra**	**Ford**	**D**	2	6	7	5	63	77.778 (63.636)	Round 8 of 11	3	26	41.270
1970	(Austria) Jochen Rindt	28	(United Kingdom) **Lotus**	**Ford**	**F**	3	5	5	1	45	45.455 (38.462)	Round 12 of 13 (Note: Rindt's championship was confirmed two rounds after he had been killed in an accident during qualifying for the Italian Grand Prix.)	1	5	11.111
1971	(United Kingdom) Jackie Stewart	32	(United Kingdom) **Tyrrell**	**Ford**	**G**	6	6	7	3	62	76.543 (62.626)	Round 8 of 11	3	29	46.774
1972	(Brazil) Emerson Fittipaldi	25	(United Kingdom) **Lotus**	**Ford**	**F**	3	5	8	0	61	67.778 (56.481)	Round 10 of 12	2	16	26.230
1973	(United Kingdom) Jackie Stewart	34	(United Kingdom) Tyrrell	Ford	**G**	3	5	8	1	71	60.684 (52.593)	Round 13 of 15	2	16	22.535
1974	(Brazil) Emerson Fittipaldi	27	(United Kingdom) **McLaren**	**Ford**	**G**	2	3	7	0	55	47.009 (40.741)	Round 15 of 15	0	3	5.455
1975	(Austria) Niki Lauda	26	(Italy) **Ferrari**	**Ferrari**	**G**	9	5	8	2	64.5	59.722 (55.128)	Round 13 of 14	1	19.5	30.233
1976	(United Kingdom) James Hunt	29	(United Kingdom) McLaren	Ford	**G**	8	6	8	2	69	54.762 (47.917)	Round 16 of 16	0	1	1.449
1977	(Austria) Niki Lauda	28	(Italy) **Ferrari**	**Ferrari**	**G**	2	3	10	3	72	53.333 (47.059)	Round 15 of 17	2	17	23.611
1978	(United States) Mario Andretti	38	(United Kingdom) **Lotus**	**Ford**	**G**	8	6	7	3	64	50.794 (44.444)	Round 14 of 16	2	13	20.313
1979	(South Africa) Jody Scheckter	39	(Italy) **Ferrari**	**Ferrari**	**M**	1	3	6	0	51	70.833 (44.444)	Round 13 of 15	2	4	7.843
1980	(Australia) Alan Jones	34	(United Kingdom) **Williams**	**Ford**	**G**	3	5	10	5	67	74.444 (56.349)	Round 13 of 14	1	13	19.403
1981	(Brazil) Nelson Piquet	29	(United Kingdom) Brabham	Ford	**M** **G**	4	3	7	1	50	50.505 (37.037)	Round 15 of 15	0	1	2.000
1982	(Finland) Keke Rosberg	34	(United Kingdom) Williams	Ford	**G**	1	1	6	0	44	44.444 (30.556)	Round 16 of 16	0	5	11.364
1983	(Brazil) Nelson Piquet	31	(United Kingdom) Brabham	BMW	**M**	1	3	8	4	59	59.596 (43.704)	Round 15 of 15	0	2	3.390
1984	(Austria) Niki Lauda	35	(United Kingdom) **McLaren**	**TAG**	**M**	0	5	9	5	72	72.727 (51.613)	Round 16 of 16	0	0.5	0.694
1985	(France) Alain Prost	30	(United Kingdom) **McLaren**	**TAG**	**G**	2	5	11	5	73	73.737 (52.778)	Round 14 of 16	2	20	27.397
1986	(France) Alain Prost	31	(United Kingdom) McLaren	TAG	**G**	1	4	11	2	72	72.727 (51.389)	Round 16 of 16	0	2	2.778
1987	(Brazil) Nelson Piquet	35	(United Kingdom) **Williams**	**Honda**	**G**	4	3	11	4	73	73.737 (52.778)	Round 15 of 16	1	12	16.438
1988	(Brazil) Ayrton Senna	28	(United Kingdom) **McLaren**	**Honda**	**G**	13	8	11	3	90	90.909 (65.278)	Round 15 of 16	1	3	3.333
1989	(France) Alain Prost	34	(United Kingdom) **McLaren**	**Honda**	**G**	2	4	11	5	76	76.768 (56.250)	Round 15 of 16	1	16	21.053
1990	(Brazil) Ayrton Senna	30	(United Kingdom) **McLaren**	**Honda**	**G**	10	6	11	2	78	78.788 (54.167)	Round 15 of 16	1	7	8.974
1991	(Brazil) Ayrton Senna	31	(United Kingdom) **McLaren**	**Honda**	**G**	8	7	12	2	96	61.935	Round 15 of 16	1	24	25.000
1992	(United Kingdom) Nigel Mansell	39	(United Kingdom) **Williams**	**Renault**	**G**	14	9	12	8	108	67.500	Round 11 of 16	5	52	48.148
1993	(France) Alain Prost	38	(United Kingdom) **Williams**	**Renault**	**G**	13	7	12	6	99	61.875	Round 14 of 16	2	26	26.263
1994	(Germany) Michael Schumacher	25	(United Kingdom) Benetton	Ford	**G**	6	8	10	8	92	57.500	Round 16 of 16	0	1	1.087
1995	(Germany) Michael Schumacher	26	(United Kingdom) **Benetton**	**Renault**	**G**	4	9	11	8	102	60.000	Round 15 of 17	2	33	32.353
1996	(United Kingdom) Damon Hill	36	(United Kingdom) **Williams**	**Renault**	**G**	9	8	10	5	97	60.625	Round 16 of 16	0	19	19.588
1997	(Canada) Jacques Villeneuve	26	(United Kingdom) **Williams**	**Renault**	**G**	10	7	8	3	81	47.647	Round 17 of 17	0	39 (Note: Schumacher scored 78 points during the 1997 season, 3 points behind Villeneuve, but was disqualified from the championship for deliberately colliding with Villeneuve in the final race of the season, the European Grand Prix. This left Villeneuve with a 39-point margin over Frentzen with 42 points.)	48.148
1998	(Finland) Mika Häkkinen	30	(United Kingdom) **McLaren**	**Mercedes**	**B**	9	8	11	6	100	62.500	Round 16 of 16	0	14	14.000
1999	(Finland) Mika Häkkinen	31	(United Kingdom) McLaren	Mercedes	**B**	11	5	10	6	76	47.500	Round 16 of 16	0	2	2.632
2000	(Germany) Michael Schumacher	31	(Italy) **Ferrari**	**Ferrari**	**B**	9	9	12	2	108	63.529	Round 16 of 17	1	19	17.593
2001	(Germany) Michael Schumacher	32	(Italy) **Ferrari**	**Ferrari**	**B**	11	9	14	3	123	72.353	Round 13 of 17	4	58	47.154
2002	(Germany) Michael Schumacher	33	(Italy) **Ferrari**	**Ferrari**	**B**	7	11	17	7	144	84.706	Round 11 of 17	6	67	46.528
2003	(Germany) Michael Schumacher	34	(Italy) **Ferrari**	**Ferrari**	**B**	5	6	8	5	93	58.125	Round 16 of 16	0	2	2.151
2004	(Germany) Michael Schumacher	35	(Italy) **Ferrari**	**Ferrari**	**B**	8	13	15	10	148	82.222	Round 14 of 18	4	34	22.973
2005	(Spain) Fernando Alonso	24	(France) **Renault**	**Renault**	**M**	6	7	15	2	133	70.000	Round 17 of 19	2	21	15.789
2006	(Spain) Fernando Alonso	25	(France) **Renault**	**Renault**	**M**	6	7	14	5	134	74.444	Round 18 of 18	0	13	9.701
2007	(Finland) Kimi Räikkönen	28	(Italy) **Ferrari**	**Ferrari**	**B**	3	6	12	6	110	64.706	Round 17 of 17	0	1	0.909
2008	(United Kingdom) Lewis Hamilton	23	(United Kingdom) McLaren	Mercedes	**B**	7	5	10	1	98	54.444	Round 18 of 18	0	1	1.020
2009	(United Kingdom) Jenson Button	29	(United Kingdom) **Brawn**	**Mercedes**	**B**	4	6	9	2	95	57.576	Round 16 of 17	1	11	11.579
2010	(Germany) Sebastian Vettel	23	(Austria) **Red Bull**	**Renault**	**B**	10	5	10	3	256	53.895	Round 19 of 19	0	4	1.563
2011	(Germany) Sebastian Vettel	24	(Austria) **Red Bull**	**Renault**	**P**	15	11	17	3	392	82.526	Round 15 of 19	4	122	31.122
2012	(Germany) Sebastian Vettel	25	(Austria) **Red Bull**	**Renault**	**P**	6	5	10	6	281	56.200	Round 20 of 20	0	3	1.068
2013	(Germany) Sebastian Vettel	26	(Austria) **Red Bull**	**Renault**	**P**	9	13	16	7	397	83.579	Round 16 of 19	3	155	39.043
2014	(United Kingdom) Lewis Hamilton	29	(Germany) **Mercedes**	**Mercedes**	**P**	7	11	16	7	384	76.800	Round 19 of 19	0	67	17.448
2015	(United Kingdom) Lewis Hamilton	30	(Germany) **Mercedes**	**Mercedes**	**P**	11	10	17	8	381	80.211	Round 16 of 19	3	59	15.486
2016	(Germany) Nico Rosberg	31	(Germany) **Mercedes**	**Mercedes**	**P**	8	9	16	6	385	73.333	Round 21 of 21	0	5	1.299
2017	(United Kingdom) Lewis Hamilton	32	(Germany) **Mercedes**	**Mercedes**	**P**	11	9	13	7	363	72.600	Round 18 of 20	2	46	12.672
2018	(United Kingdom) Lewis Hamilton	33	(Germany) **Mercedes**	**Mercedes**	**P**	11	11	17	3	408	77.714	Round 19 of 21	2	88	21.569
2019	(United Kingdom) Lewis Hamilton	34	(Germany) **Mercedes**	**Mercedes**	**P**	5	11	17	6	413	75.641	Round 19 of 21	2	87	21.065
2020	(United Kingdom) Lewis Hamilton	35	(Germany) **Mercedes**	**Mercedes**	**P**	10	11	14	6	347	78.507	Round 14 of 17	3	124	35.735
2021	(Netherlands) Max Verstappen	24	(Austria) Red Bull	Honda	**P**	10	10	18	6	395.5	69.692	Round 22 of 22	0	8	2.023
2022	(Netherlands) Max Verstappen	25	(Austria) **Red Bull**	**RBPT**	**P**	7	15	17	5	454	76.174	Round 18 of 22	4	146	32.159
2023	(Netherlands) Max Verstappen	26	(Austria) **Red Bull**	**Honda RBPT**	**P**	12	19	21	9	575	92.742	Round 17 of 22	5	290	50.435
2024	(Netherlands) Max Verstappen	27	(Austria) Red Bull	Honda RBPT	**P**	8	9	14	3	437	65.030	Round 22 of 24	2	63	14.416
2025	(United Kingdom) Lando Norris	26	(United Kingdom) **McLaren**	**Mercedes**	**P**	7	7	18	6	423	65.278	Round 24 of 24	0	2	0.473
2026*	(Italy) Kimi Antonelli	20	(Germany) **Mercedes**	**Mercedes**	**P**	7	9	16	8	390	71.168	Round 19 of 23	4		
Season	Driver	Age	Chassis	Engine	Tyres	Poles	Wins	Podiums	Fastest laps	Points	% Points	Clinched	# of rounds remaining	Margin	% Margin
Season	Driver	Age	Constructor		Tyres	Poles	Wins	Podiums	Fastest laps	Points	% Points	Clinched	# of rounds remaining	Margin	% Margin

- Season ongoing. Information accurate as of the 2026 Mexico City Grand Prix.

== By driver ==
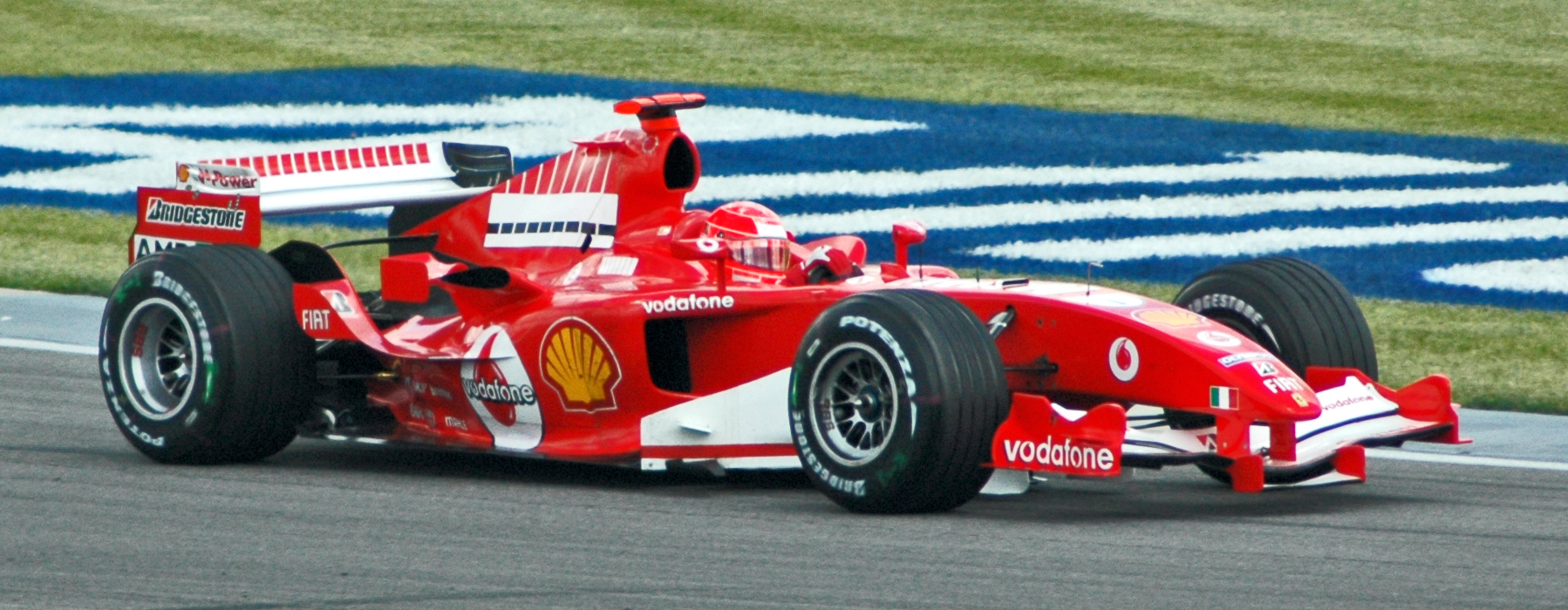
Michael Schumacher has won the World Drivers' Championship a record seven times – twice with Benetton and five times with Ferrari.

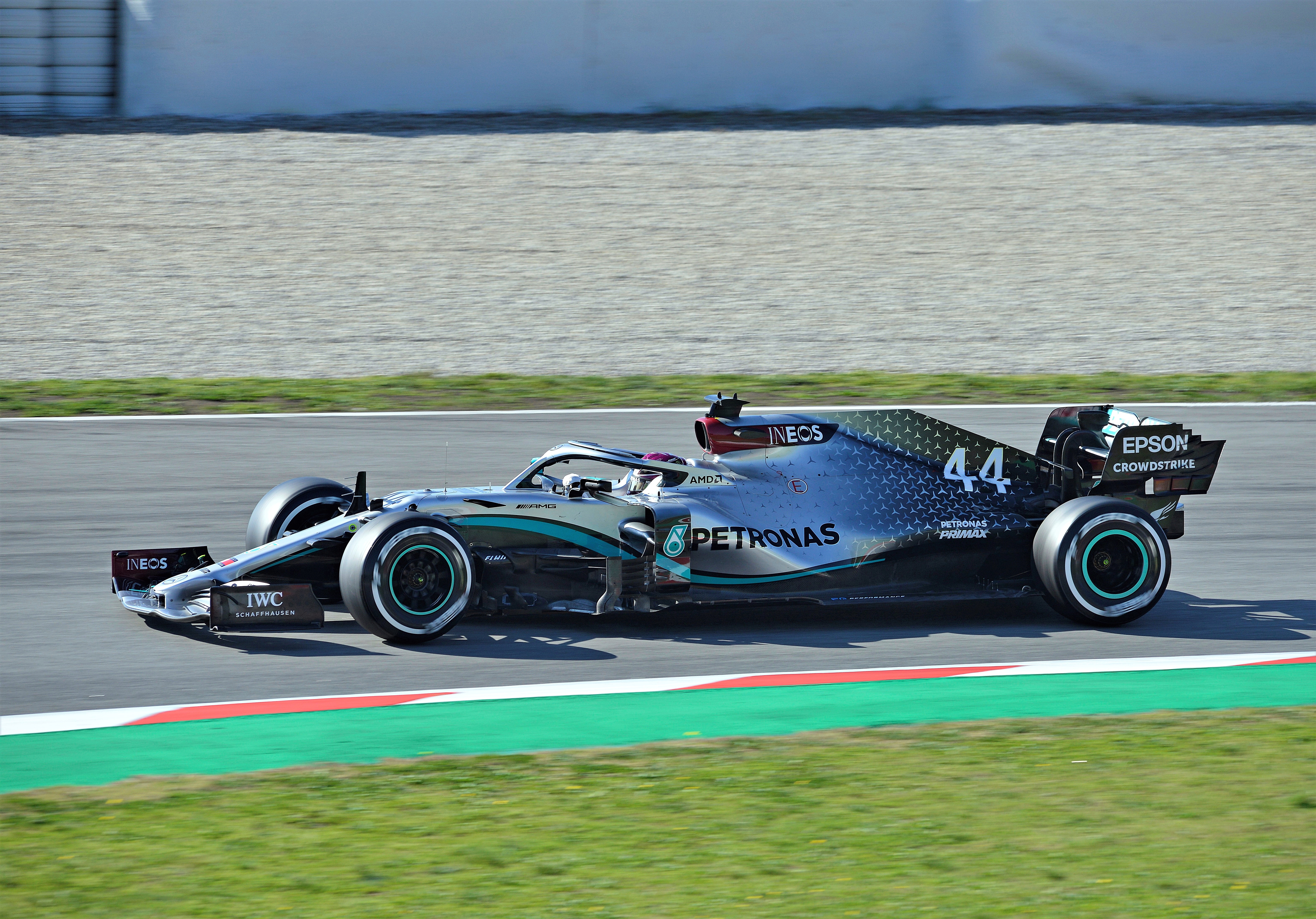
Lewis Hamilton equaled Schumacher's record in 2020, winning one with McLaren and six with Mercedes.

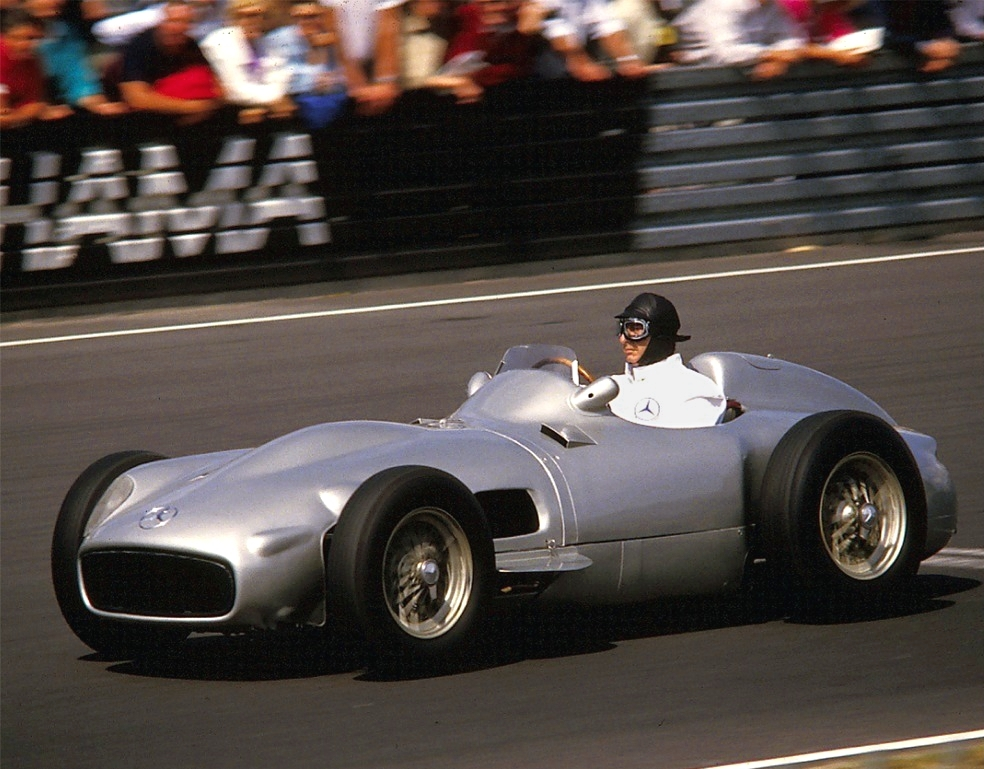
Juan Manuel Fangio won the World Drivers' Championship five times with Alfa Romeo, Maserati, Mercedes and Ferrari. He held the record from 1955 until 2003.

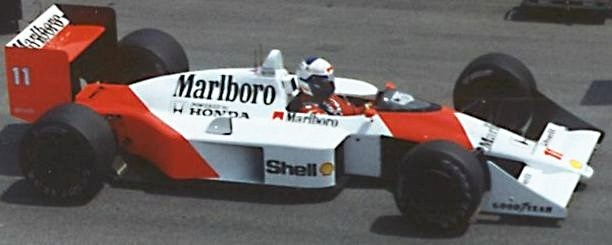
Alain Prost has four titles, three for McLaren and one for Williams. He also just missed winning the title for Renault (finished second, by two points) and for Ferrari (finished second, by seven points).

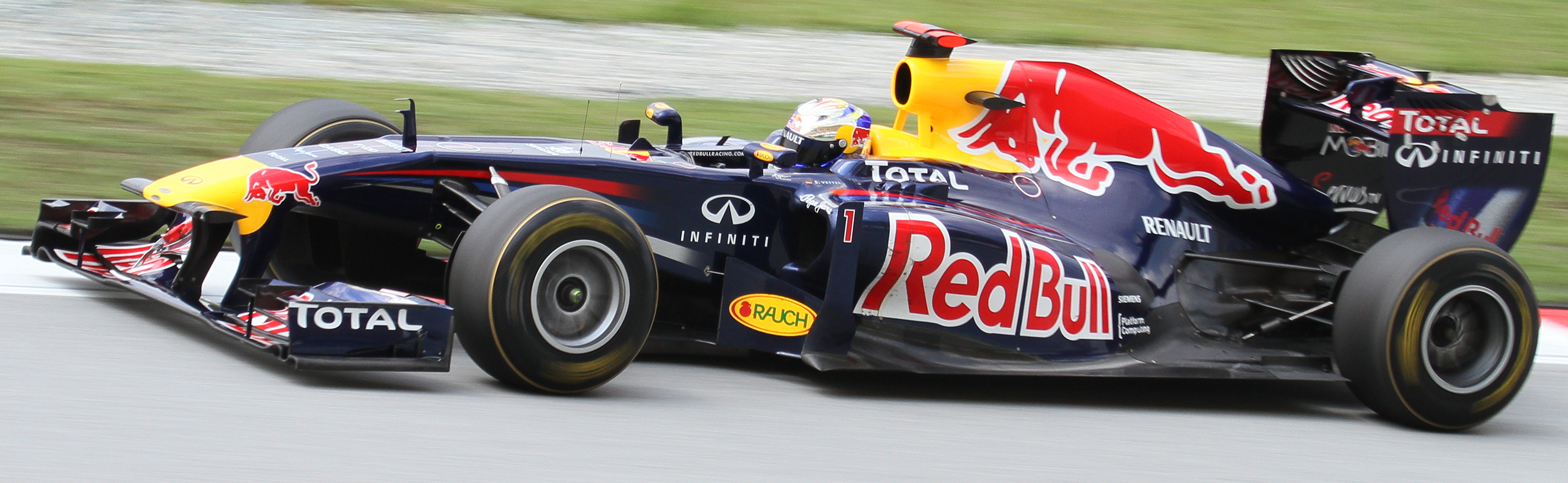
Sebastian Vettel has four titles to his name, all of which he won consecutively with Red Bull Racing.

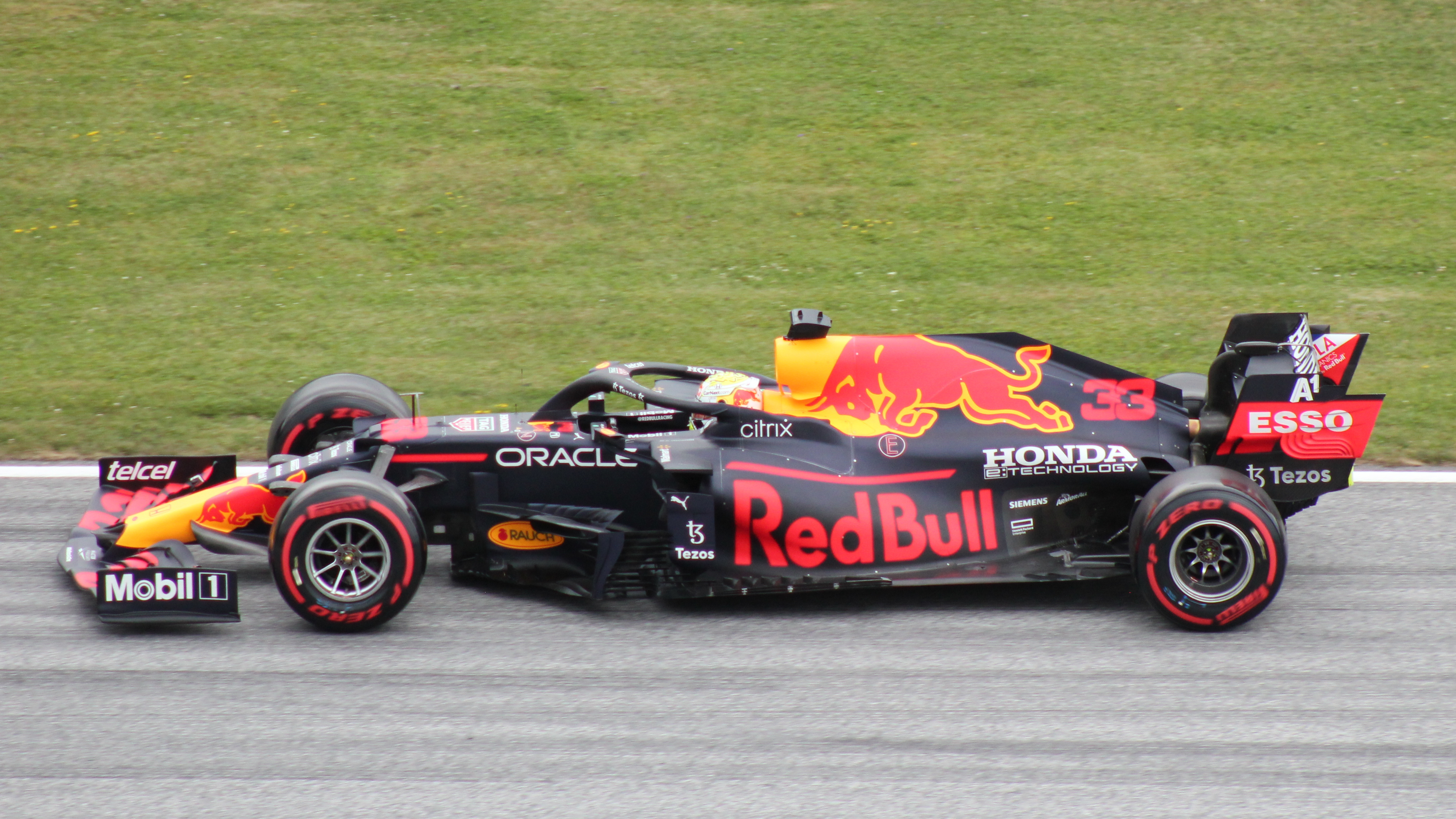
Max Verstappen won four consecutive World Drivers' Championships in 2021, 2022, 2023 and 2024 with Red Bull Racing.

Drivers in bold have competed in the 2026 World Championship.

Drivers by number of World Drivers' Championships won
Driver	Titles	Season(s)
(Germany) Michael Schumacher	7	1994, 1995, 2000, 2001, 2002, 2003, 2004
(United Kingdom) **Lewis Hamilton**	7	2008, 2014, 2015, 2017, 2018, 2019, 2020
(Argentina) Juan Manuel Fangio	5	1951, 1954, 1955, 1956, 1957
(France) Alain Prost	4	1985, 1986, 1989, 1993
(Germany) Sebastian Vettel	4	2010, 2011, 2012, 2013
(Netherlands) **Max Verstappen**	4	2021, 2022, 2023, 2024
(Australia) Jack Brabham	3	1959, 1960, 1966
(United Kingdom) Jackie Stewart	3	1969, 1971, 1973
(Austria) Niki Lauda	3	1975, 1977, 1984
(Brazil) Nelson Piquet	3	1981, 1983, 1987
(Brazil) Ayrton Senna	3	1988, 1990, 1991
(Italy) Alberto Ascari	2	1952, 1953
(United Kingdom) Graham Hill	2	1962, 1968
(United Kingdom) Jim Clark	2	1963, 1965
(Brazil) Emerson Fittipaldi	2	1972, 1974
(Finland) Mika Häkkinen	2	1998, 1999
(Spain) **Fernando Alonso**	2	2005, 2006
(Italy) Giuseppe Farina	1	1950
(United Kingdom) Mike Hawthorn	1	1958
(United States) Phil Hill	1	1961
(United Kingdom) John Surtees	1	1964
(New Zealand) Denny Hulme	1	1967
(Austria) Jochen Rindt	1	1970
(United Kingdom) James Hunt	1	1976
(United States) Mario Andretti	1	1978
(South Africa) Jody Scheckter	1	1979
(Australia) Alan Jones	1	1980
(Finland) Keke Rosberg	1	1982
(United Kingdom) Nigel Mansell	1	1992
(United Kingdom) Damon Hill	1	1996
(Canada) Jacques Villeneuve	1	1997
(Finland) Kimi Räikkönen	1	2007
(United Kingdom) Jenson Button	1	2009
(Germany) Nico Rosberg	1	2016
(United Kingdom) **Lando Norris**	1	2025
(Italy) **Kimi Antonelli**	1	2026
36 drivers		77 titles

== By driver nationality ==
World Drivers' Champions by nationality
Country	Titles	Drivers	Seasons	By driver (titles)
United Kingdom	21	11	1958, 1962–1965, 1968–1969, 1971, 1973, 1976, 1992, 1996, 2008–2009, 2014–2015, 2017–2020, 2025	**Lewis Hamilton** (7)
United Kingdom	21	11	1958, 1962–1965, 1968–1969, 1971, 1973, 1976, 1992, 1996, 2008–2009, 2014–2015, 2017–2020, 2025	Jackie Stewart (3)
United Kingdom	21	11	1958, 1962–1965, 1968–1969, 1971, 1973, 1976, 1992, 1996, 2008–2009, 2014–2015, 2017–2020, 2025	Jim Clark (2)
United Kingdom	21	11	1958, 1962–1965, 1968–1969, 1971, 1973, 1976, 1992, 1996, 2008–2009, 2014–2015, 2017–2020, 2025	Graham Hill (2)
United Kingdom	21	11	1958, 1962–1965, 1968–1969, 1971, 1973, 1976, 1992, 1996, 2008–2009, 2014–2015, 2017–2020, 2025	Jenson Button (1)
United Kingdom	21	11	1958, 1962–1965, 1968–1969, 1971, 1973, 1976, 1992, 1996, 2008–2009, 2014–2015, 2017–2020, 2025	Mike Hawthorn (1)
United Kingdom	21	11	1958, 1962–1965, 1968–1969, 1971, 1973, 1976, 1992, 1996, 2008–2009, 2014–2015, 2017–2020, 2025	Damon Hill (1)
United Kingdom	21	11	1958, 1962–1965, 1968–1969, 1971, 1973, 1976, 1992, 1996, 2008–2009, 2014–2015, 2017–2020, 2025	James Hunt (1)
United Kingdom	21	11	1958, 1962–1965, 1968–1969, 1971, 1973, 1976, 1992, 1996, 2008–2009, 2014–2015, 2017–2020, 2025	Nigel Mansell (1)
United Kingdom	21	11	1958, 1962–1965, 1968–1969, 1971, 1973, 1976, 1992, 1996, 2008–2009, 2014–2015, 2017–2020, 2025	**Lando Norris** (1)
United Kingdom	21	11	1958, 1962–1965, 1968–1969, 1971, 1973, 1976, 1992, 1996, 2008–2009, 2014–2015, 2017–2020, 2025	John Surtees (1)
Germany	12	3	1994–1995, 2000–2004, 2010–2013, 2016	Michael Schumacher (7)
Germany	12	3	1994–1995, 2000–2004, 2010–2013, 2016	Sebastian Vettel (4)
Germany	12	3	1994–1995, 2000–2004, 2010–2013, 2016	Nico Rosberg (1)
Brazil	8	3	1972, 1974, 1981, 1983, 1987–1988, 1990–1991	Nelson Piquet (3)
Brazil	8	3	1972, 1974, 1981, 1983, 1987–1988, 1990–1991	Ayrton Senna (3)
Brazil	8	3	1972, 1974, 1981, 1983, 1987–1988, 1990–1991	Emerson Fittipaldi (2)
Argentina	5	1	1951, 1954–1957	Juan Manuel Fangio (5)
Australia	4	2	1959–1960, 1966, 1980	Jack Brabham (3)
Australia	4	2	1959–1960, 1966, 1980	Alan Jones (1)
Austria	4	2	1970, 1975, 1977, 1984	Niki Lauda (3)
Austria	4	2	1970, 1975, 1977, 1984	Jochen Rindt (1)
France	4	1	1985–1986, 1989, 1993	Alain Prost (4)
Finland	4	3	1982, 1998–1999, 2007	Mika Häkkinen (2)
Finland	4	3	1982, 1998–1999, 2007	Kimi Räikkönen (1)
Finland	4	3	1982, 1998–1999, 2007	Keke Rosberg (1)
Netherlands	4	1	2021–2024	**Max Verstappen** (4)
Italy	4	3	1950, 1952–1953, 2026	Alberto Ascari (2)
Italy	4	3	1950, 1952–1953, 2026	Giuseppe Farina (1)
Italy	4	3	1950, 1952–1953, 2026	**Kimi Antonelli** (1)
United States	2	2	1961, 1978	Mario Andretti (1)
United States	2	2	1961, 1978	Phil Hill (1)
Spain	2	1	2005–2006	**Fernando Alonso** (2)
New Zealand	1	1	1967	Denny Hulme (1)
South Africa	1	1	1979	Jody Scheckter (1)
Canada	1	1	1997	Jacques Villeneuve (1)
15 countries	77 titles	36 drivers		

Drivers in bold have competed in the 2026 World Championship.

== Records ==
=== Youngest Drivers' champions ===
Youngest World Drivers' Championship winners
	Driver	Age	Season
1	(Italy) **Kimi Antonelli**	20 years, 68 days	2026
2	(Germany) Sebastian Vettel	23 years, 134 days	2010
3	(United Kingdom) **Lewis Hamilton**	23 years, 300 days	2008
4	(Spain) **Fernando Alonso**	24 years, 58 days	2005
5	(Netherlands) **Max Verstappen**	24 years, 73 days	2021
6	(Brazil) Emerson Fittipaldi	25 years, 273 days	1972
7	(Germany) Michael Schumacher	25 years, 314 days	1994
8	(United Kingdom) **Lando Norris**	26 years, 24 days	2025
9	(Austria) Niki Lauda	26 years, 197 days	1975
10	(Canada) Jacques Villeneuve	26 years, 200 days	1997

Where drivers have won more than one World Drivers' Championship, only their first win is noted here. Drivers in bold have competed in the 2026 World Championship.

=== Oldest Drivers' champions ===
Oldest World Drivers' Championship winners
	Driver	Age	Season
1	(Argentina) Juan Manuel Fangio	46 years, 41 days	1957
2	(Italy) Giuseppe Farina	43 years, 308 days	1950
3	(Australia) Jack Brabham	40 years, 155 days	1966
4	(United Kingdom) Graham Hill	39 years, 262 days	1968
5	(United Kingdom) Nigel Mansell	39 years, 8 days	1992
6	(France) Alain Prost	38 years, 214 days	1993
7	(United States) Mario Andretti	38 years, 193 days	1978
8	(United Kingdom) Damon Hill	36 years, 26 days	1996
9	(United Kingdom) **Lewis Hamilton**	35 years, 313 days	2020
10	(Austria) Niki Lauda	35 years, 242 days	1984

Where drivers have won more than one World Drivers' Championship, only their last win is noted here. Drivers in bold have competed in the 2026 World Championship.

=== Consecutive Drivers' championships ===
A total of 11 drivers have achieved consecutive wins in the World Drivers' Championship. Of those, only Michael Schumacher and Lewis Hamilton have won two sets of consecutive Formula One Drivers' championships.

Consecutive World Drivers' Championship wins
Championships	Driver	Seasons
5	(Germany) Michael Schumacher	2000–2004
4	(Argentina) Juan Manuel Fangio	1954–1957
4	(Germany) Sebastian Vettel	2010–2013
4	(United Kingdom) **Lewis Hamilton**	2017–2020
4	(Netherlands) **Max Verstappen**	2021–2024
2	(Italy) Alberto Ascari	1952–1953
2	(Australia) Jack Brabham	1959–1960
2	(France) Alain Prost	1985–1986
2	(Brazil) Ayrton Senna	1990–1991
2	(Germany) Michael Schumacher	1994–1995
2	(Finland) Mika Häkkinen	1998–1999
2	(Spain) **Fernando Alonso**	2005–2006
2	(United Kingdom) **Lewis Hamilton**	2014–2015

Drivers in bold have competed in the 2026 World Championship.

=== Drivers' Champions for constructors that did not win the Constructors' Championship in that year ===
Drivers' Champions for constructors who did not claim the Constructors' Championship that year
Championships	Drivers (Note: Juan Manuel Fangio, Alberto Ascari and Giuseppe Farina are not on the list, because they were champions before the first Constructors' Championship was awarded in 1958.)	Years
2	(Brazil) Nelson Piquet	1981, 1983
2	(Netherlands) **Max Verstappen**	2021, 2024
1	(United Kingdom) Mike Hawthorn	1958
1	(United Kingdom) Jackie Stewart	1973
1	(United Kingdom) James Hunt	1976
1	(Finland) Keke Rosberg	1982
1	(France) Alain Prost	1986
1	(Germany) Michael Schumacher	1994
1	(Finland) Mika Häkkinen	1999
1	(United Kingdom) **Lewis Hamilton**	2008

Drivers in bold have competed in the 2026 World Championship.

== By chassis constructor ==
Constructors in bold have competed in the 2026 World Championship.

Constructors by number of World Drivers' Championships won
Constructor	Titles	Season(s)
**(Italy) Ferrari**	15	1952, 1953, 1956, 1958, 1961, 1964, 1975, 1977, 1979, 2000, 2001, 2002, 2003, 2004, 2007
**(United Kingdom) McLaren**	13	1974, 1976, 1984, 1985, 1986, 1988, 1989, 1990, 1991, 1998, 1999, 2008, 2025
**(Germany) Mercedes** (Note: Fangio competed in the 1954 Argentine and Belgian Grands Prix with Maserati, then completed the season with Mercedes. This shared championship is counted for each of these constructors.)	10	1954, 1955, 2014, 2015, 2016, 2017, 2018, 2019, 2020, 2026
**(Austria) Red Bull Racing**	8	2010, 2011, 2012, 2013, 2021, 2022, 2023, 2024
**(United Kingdom) Williams**	7	1980, 1982, 1987, 1992, 1993, 1996, 1997
**(United Kingdom)** Lotus	6	1963, 1965, 1968, 1970, 1972, 1978
**(United Kingdom)** Brabham	4	1966, 1967, 1981, 1983
**(Italy)** Alfa Romeo	2	1950, 1951
**(Italy)** Maserati	2	1954, 1957
**(United Kingdom)** Cooper	2	1959, 1960
**(United Kingdom)** Tyrrell	2	1971, 1973
**(United Kingdom)** Benetton	2	1994, 1995
**(France)** Renault	2	2005, 2006
**(United Kingdom)** BRM	1	1962
**(France)** Matra	1	1969
**(United Kingdom)** Brawn	1	2009
16 constructors	78 titles	

== By engine manufacturer ==
Engine manufacturers in bold have competed in the 2026 World Championship.

Engine manufacturers by World Drivers' Championship wins
Manufacturer	Titles	Season(s)
**Ferrari**	15	1952, 1953, 1956, 1958, 1961, 1964, 1975, 1977, 1979, 2000, 2001, 2002, 2003, 2004, 2007
**Mercedes** (Note: Fangio competed in the 1954 Argentine and Belgian Grands Prix with Maserati, then completed the season with Mercedes. This shared championship is counted for each of these engine manufacturers.) (Note: In 1998 and 1999 built by Ilmor.)	15	1954, 1955, 1998, 1999, 2008, 2009, 2014, 2015, 2016, 2017, 2018, 2019, 2020, 2025, 2026
Ford (Note: Built by Cosworth.)	13	1968, 1969, 1970, 1971, 1972, 1973, 1974, 1976, 1978, 1980, 1981, 1982, 1994
Renault (Note: Built by Mecachrome.)	11	1992, 1993, 1995, 1996, 1997, 2005, 2006, 2010, 2011, 2012, 2013
**Honda**	6	1987, 1988, 1989, 1990, 1991, 2021
Climax	4	1959, 1960, 1963, 1965
TAG (Note: Built by Porsche.)	3	1984, 1985, 1986
Alfa Romeo	2	1950, 1951
Maserati	2	1954, 1957
Repco	2	1966, 1967
Honda RBPT	2	2023, 2024
BRM	1	1962
BMW	1	1983
RBPT (Note: Built by Honda.)	1	2022
14 manufacturers	78 titles	

== By tyres used ==
Tyre manufacturers in bold have competed in the 2026 World Championship.

World Drivers' Championship victories by tyre manufacturer
Rank	Manufacturer		Titles	Seasons
1	G	Goodyear	24 (7) (Note: Goodyear was the sole tyre supplier for the 1987, 1988 and 1992–1996 seasons.)	1966–1967, 1971, 1973–1978, 1980, 1982, 1985–1997
2	P	**Pirelli**	22 (16) (Note: Pirelli has been the sole tyre supplier since the 2011 season.)	1950–1954, (Note: Fangio competed in the 1954 Argentine and Belgian Grands Prix on Pirelli tyres, then completed the season on Continental. This shared championship is counted for each of these manufacturers.) (Note: Ascari competed in the 1952 Indianapolis 500 on Firestone tyres, then completed the season on Pirelli.) 1957, 2011–2026
3	B	Bridgestone	11 (6) (Note: Bridgestone was the sole tyre supplier for the 1999, 2000 and 2007–2010 seasons.)	1998–2004, 2007–2010
4	D	Dunlop	8 (4) (Note: Dunlop was the sole tyre supplier for the 1960–1963 seasons.)	1959–1965, 1969
5	M	Michelin	6	1979, 1981, 1983–1984, 2005–2006
6	F	Firestone	4	1952, 1968, 1970, 1972
7	C	Continental	2	1954–1955
7	E	Englebert	2	1956, 1958

Numbers in parentheses indicate championships won as the sole tyre supplier.

== See also ==
- History of Formula One
- List of Formula One driver records
- List of Formula One drivers
- List of Formula One World Constructors' Champions
