= 1953 Belgian Grand Prix =

← Previous race	Next race →
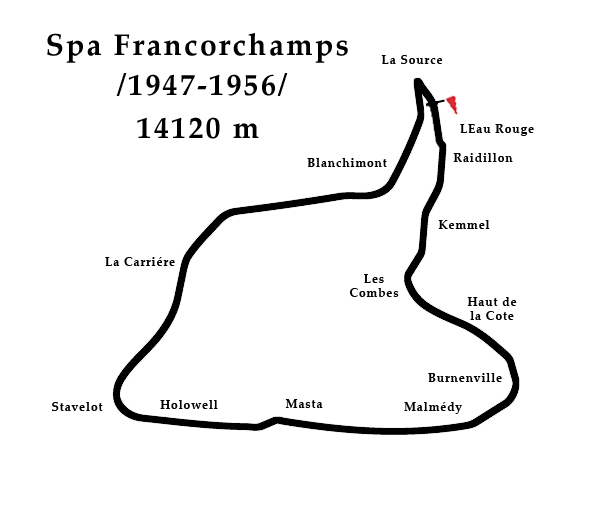
- Spa-Francorchamps layout

Race details
- Date: 21 June 1953
- Official name: XV Grand Prix de Belgique
- Location: Circuit de Spa-Francorchamps, Francorchamps, Belgium
- Course: Permanent racing circuit
- Course length: 14.120 km (8.774 miles)
- Distance: 36 laps, 508.320 km (315.855 miles)
- Weather: Hot, dry

Pole position
Driver	(Argentina) Juan Manuel Fangio	Maserati
- Time: 4:30.0

Fastest lap
Driver	(Argentina) José Froilán González	Maserati
- Time: 4:34.0 on lap 2

Podium
First	(Italy) Alberto Ascari	Ferrari
Second	(Italy) Luigi Villoresi	Ferrari
Third	(Argentina) Onofre Marimón	Maserati

The 1953 Belgian Grand Prix was a Formula Two race held on 21 June 1953 at Circuit de Spa-Francorchamps. It was race 4 of 9 in the 1953 World Championship of Drivers, which was run to Formula Two rules in 1952 and 1953, rather than the Formula One regulations normally used. The 36-lap race was won by Ferrari driver Alberto Ascari after he started from second position. His teammate Luigi Villoresi finished second and Maserati driver Onofre Marimón came in third.

== Race report ==
Two weeks after the previous World Championship race, the Dutch Grand Prix, the teams headed to the Circuit de Spa-Francorchamps in Belgium. Ferrari were once again unchanged from the previous race, retaining the lineup of Alberto Ascari, Nino Farina, Luigi Villoresi and Mike Hawthorn, while there were also privateer Ferraris for Louis Rosier and the Ecurie Francorchamps duo of Jacques Swaters and Charles de Tornaco. The Maserati factory team added Johnny Claes and a third Argentine, Onofre Marimón, to their lineup of Juan Manuel Fangio and José Froilán González, while Felice Bonetto missed this race. Toulo de Graffenried drove the only privateer Maserati at Spa. Jean Behra, whose injuries prevented his participation at Zandvoort, returned for Gordini alongside Maurice Trintignant, and the American pairing of Harry Schell and Fred Wacker, while HWM called on the services of Paul Frère (as they had done the previous year) in their third car in addition to regulars Peter Collins and Lance Macklin. The field was completed by several privateers—Berger in a Simca-Gordini, Legat in a Veritas and Pilette in a Connaught.

A record crowd of over 100,000 spectators crammed into the forest track to watch this dramatic race. The Maseratis were definitely capable of matching the Ferraris for sheer speed – Juan Manuel Fangio put in a record-shattering practice lap of 117 mph, breaking Ascari's run of five consecutive pole positions (excluding the Indianapolis 500). The defending World Champion had to settle for second place on the grid this time. The Maserati of González completed the front row, while row two consisted of the Ferraris of Farina and Villoresi. On the third row were Marimón in a Maserati, the remaining works Ferrari of Hawthorn, and Trintignant in the leading Gordini. Toulo de Graffenried, in his own Maserati, out-qualified the fourth works Maserati of Johnny Claes, with both starting from row four, while the remaining Gordinis were split between the fifth and sixth rows of the grid.

At the flag, Fangio waved González past and stunned everyone with another blitzkrieg lap of 110 mph from a standing start. After 11 laps, González had pulled out a full minute's lead, but it had taken its toll on his engine which expired, leaving Fangio half a minute clear. On lap 13, it was the other Argentine's turn to fall prey to engine troubles and so Ascari inherited the lead, initially ahead of Farina, before his race was ended by engine problems, handing second place to Hawthorn, while Marimón and Villoresi were third and fourth, respectively. Engine problems for Marimón allowed Villoresi to move up to third on lap 28, and a fuel leak for Hawthorn meant that Villoresi inherited second place on the following lap. Shortly after his own car had retired, Fangio took over Claes's, and made something of a charge through the field: before Fangio retired on lap 14, Claes had been in ninth; by lap 30, Fangio had taken the car to third, behind only Ascari and Villoresi, who took another 1–2 victory. However, Fangio crashed heavily on the final lap of the race, giving his teammate Onofre Marimón his first podium position in the process. The remaining points were taken by the privateer Maserati of de Graffenried and the Gordini of Trintignant, while Hawthorn, in sixth place, just missed out.

Alberto Ascari, who had taken his ninth consecutive World Championship victory (ignoring the Indy 500), already had a large lead in the points standings. He was twelve points ahead of his teammate Villoresi, while Bill Vukovich, who won at Indianapolis, was third. González, who took the fastest lap point for this race, now had seven points, putting him eighteen points behind Ascari, and the remaining Ferraris of Farina and Hawthorn only had six points each.

== Entries ==
No	Driver	Entrant	Constructor	Chassis	Engine	Tyre
2	(Argentina) José Froilán González	Officine Alfieri Maserati	Maserati	Maserati A6GCM-53	Maserati A6G 2.0 L6	P
4	(Argentina) Juan Manuel Fangio	Officine Alfieri Maserati	Maserati	Maserati A6GCM-53	Maserati A6G 2.0 L6	P
6	(Belgium) Johnny Claes^{1}	Officine Alfieri Maserati	Maserati	Maserati A6GCM-53	Maserati A6G 2.0 L6	P
8	(Italy) Luigi Villoresi	Scuderia Ferrari	Ferrari	Ferrari 500	Ferrari Type 500 2.0 L4	P
10	(Italy) Alberto Ascari	Scuderia Ferrari	Ferrari	Ferrari 500	Ferrari Type 500 2.0 L4	P
12	(Italy) Nino Farina	Scuderia Ferrari	Ferrari	Ferrari 500	Ferrari Type 500 2.0 L4	P
14	(United Kingdom) Mike Hawthorn	Scuderia Ferrari	Ferrari	Ferrari 500	Ferrari Type 500 2.0 L4	P
16	(France) Jean Behra	Equipe Gordini	Gordini	Gordini T16	Gordini 20 2.0 L6	E
18	(France) Maurice Trintignant	Equipe Gordini	Gordini	Gordini T16	Gordini 20 2.0 L6	E
20	(United States) Harry Schell	Equipe Gordini	Gordini	Gordini T16	Gordini 20 2.0 L6	E
22	(United Kingdom) Lance Macklin	HW Motors	HWM-Alta	HWM 53	Alta F2 2.0 L4	D
24	(Belgium) Paul Frère	HW Motors	HWM-Alta	HWM 53	Alta F2 2.0 L4	D
26	(United Kingdom) Peter Collins	HW Motors	HWM-Alta	HWM 53	Alta F2 2.0 L4	D
28	(Argentina) Onofre Marimón	Officine Alfieri Maserati	Maserati	Maserati A6GCM-53	Maserati A6G 2.0 L6	P
30	(Switzerland) Toulo de Graffenried	Emmanuel de Graffenried	Maserati	Maserati A6GCM-53	Maserati A6G 2.0 L6	P
32	(France) Louis Rosier	Ecurie Rosier	Ferrari	Ferrari 500	Ferrari Type 500 2.0 L4	D
34	(Belgium) Georges Berger	Georges Berger	Simca-Gordini-Gordini	Simca-Gordini T15	Gordini 1500 1.5 L4	E
36	(Belgium) Arthur Legat	Arthur Legat	Veritas	Veritas Meteor	Veritas 2.0 L6	E
38	(United States) Fred Wacker	Equipe Gordini	Gordini	Gordini T16	Gordini 20 2.0 L6	E
40	(Belgium) André Pilette	Ecurie Belge	Connaught-Lea Francis	Connaught A	Lea Francis 2.0 L4	E
42	(Belgium) Jacques Swaters	Ecurie Francorchamps	Ferrari	Ferrari 500	Ferrari Type 500 2.0 L4	E
44	(Belgium) Charles de Tornaco	Ecurie Francorchamps	Ferrari	Ferrari 500	Ferrari Type 500 2.0 L4	E

^1 — Johnny Claes qualified and drove 14 laps of the race in the #6 Maserati. Juan Manuel Fangio, whose own car had already retired, took over the car for the remainder of the race.

== Classification ==
=== Qualifying ===
Pos	No	Driver	Constructor	Time	Gap
1	4	(Argentina) Juan Manuel Fangio	Maserati	4:30	—
2	10	(Italy) Alberto Ascari	Ferrari	4:32	+2
3	2	(Argentina) José Froilán González	Maserati	4:32	+2
4	12	(Italy) Nino Farina	Ferrari	4:36	+6
5	8	(Italy) Luigi Villoresi	Ferrari	4:39	+9
6	28	(Argentina) Onofre Marimón	Maserati	4:40	+10
7	14	(United Kingdom) Mike Hawthorn	Ferrari	4:42	+12
8	18	(France) Maurice Trintignant	Gordini	4:45	+15
9	30	(Switzerland) Toulo de Graffenried	Maserati	4:49	+19
10	6	(Belgium) Johnny Claes	Maserati	4:50	+20
11	24	(Belgium) Paul Frère	HWM-Alta	4:52	+22
12	20	(United States) Harry Schell	Gordini	4:53	+23
13	32	(France) Louis Rosier	Ferrari	4:56	+26
14	16	(France) Jean Behra	Gordini	4:57	+27
15	38	(United States) Fred Wacker	Gordini	5:03	+33
16	26	(United Kingdom) Peter Collins	HWM-Alta	5:03	+33
17	22	(United Kingdom) Lance Macklin	HWM-Alta	5:14	+44
18	40	(Belgium) André Pilette	Connaught-Lea-Francis	5:23	+53
19	36	(Belgium) Arthur Legat	Veritas	5:41	+1:11
20	34	(Belgium) Georges Berger	Simca-Gordini-Gordini	5:58	+1:28
21	42	(Belgium) Jacques Swaters	Ferrari	No time	—
22	44	(Belgium) Charles de Tornaco	Ferrari	No time	—

=== Race ===
Pos	No	Driver	Constructor	Laps	Time/Retired	Grid	Points
1	10	(Italy) Alberto Ascari	Ferrari	36	2:48:30.3	2	8
2	8	(Italy) Luigi Villoresi	Ferrari	36	+ 2:48.2	5	6
3	28	(Argentina) Onofre Marimón	Maserati	35	+ 1 Lap	6	4
4	30	(Switzerland) Toulo de Graffenried	Maserati	35	+ 1 Lap	9	3
5	18	(France) Maurice Trintignant	Gordini	35	+ 1 Lap	8	2
6	14	(United Kingdom) Mike Hawthorn	Ferrari	35	+ 1 Lap	7	
7	20	(United States) Harry Schell	Gordini	33	+ 3 Laps	12	
8	32	(France) Louis Rosier	Ferrari	33	+ 3 Laps	13	
9	38	(United States) Fred Wacker	Gordini	32	+ 4 Laps	15	
10	24	(Belgium) Paul Frère	HWM-Alta	30	+ 6 Laps	11	
11	40	(Belgium) André Pilette	Connaught-Lea-Francis	29	+ 7 Laps	18	
Ret	6	(Belgium) Johnny Claes^{2} (Argentina) Juan Manuel Fangio^{2}	Maserati	35	Accident	10	
Ret	22	(United Kingdom) Lance Macklin	HWM-Alta	19	Engine	17	
Ret	12	(Italy) Nino Farina	Ferrari	16	Engine	4	
Ret	4	(Argentina) Juan Manuel Fangio	Maserati	13	Engine	1	
Ret	2	(Argentina) José Froilán González	Maserati	11	Throttle	3	1^{1}
Ret	16	(France) Jean Behra	Gordini	9	Engine	14	
Ret	26	(United Kingdom) Peter Collins	HWM-Alta	4	Clutch	16	
Ret	34	(Belgium) Georges Berger	Simca-Gordini-Gordini	3	Engine	20	
Ret	36	(Belgium) Arthur Legat	Veritas	0	Transmission	19	
DNS	42	(Belgium) Jacques Swaters	Ferrari		Did not start		
DNS	44	(Belgium) Charles de Tornaco	Ferrari		Did not start		

Notes

- ^1 – 1 point for fastest lap
- ^2 Car #6: Johnny Claes (13 laps) and Juan Manuel Fangio (22 laps).

== Notes ==
- Juan Manuel Fangio was pointless in this race. For the next 21 races, Fangio would end the race with at least one point. This record streak only came at an end at the 1956 Belgian Grand Prix.

== Championship standings after the race ==
Drivers' Championship standings

	Pos	Driver	Points
	1	(Italy) Alberto Ascari	25
1	2	(Italy) Luigi Villoresi	13
1	3	(United States) Bill Vukovich	9
2	4	(Argentina) José Froilán González	7
1	5	(Italy) Nino Farina	6

- Note: Only the top five positions are included.

Previous race: 1953 Dutch Grand Prix	FIA Formula One World Championship; 1953 season	Next race: 1953 French Grand Prix
Previous race: 1952 Belgian Grand Prix	Belgian Grand Prix	Next race: 1954 Belgian Grand Prix
