= 1953 Italian Grand Prix =

Race 9 of 9 in the 1953 Formula One season
← Previous race	Next race →
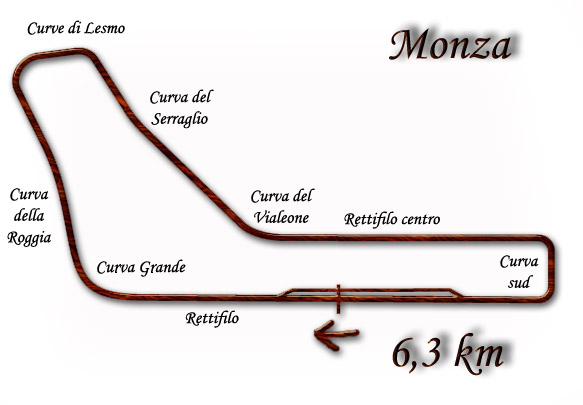
- Autodromo Nazionale di Monza layout

Race details
- Date: 13 September 1953
- Official name: XXIV Gran Premio d'Italia
- Location: Autodromo Nazionale di Monza, Monza, Italy
- Course: Permanent road course
- Course length: 6.300 km (3.915 miles)
- Distance: 80 laps, 504.000 km (313.171 miles)
- Weather: Sunny, mild, dry

Pole position
Driver	(Italy) Alberto Ascari	Ferrari
- Time: 2:02:7

Fastest lap
Driver	(Argentina) Juan Manuel Fangio	Maserati
- Time: 2:04.5 on lap 39

Podium
First	(Argentina) Juan Manuel Fangio	Maserati
Second	(Italy) Nino Farina	Ferrari
Third	(Italy) Luigi Villoresi	Ferrari

The 1953 Italian Grand Prix was a Formula Two race held on 13 September 1953 at Monza. It was the ninth and final race in the 1953 World Championship of Drivers, which was run to Formula Two rules in 1952 and 1953, rather than the Formula One regulations normally used. This made it the last World Championship race to run under the Formula Two regulations. The 80-lap race was won by Maserati driver Juan Manuel Fangio after he started from second position. Nino Farina finished second for the Ferrari team and his teammate Luigi Villoresi came in third.

== Race report ==
The initial part of the race was a four-way battle between Alberto Ascari, Giuseppe Farina, Juan Manuel Fangio and Onofre Marimón. With five drivers running together on the last lap, the race saw a spectacular finish with Ascari and Farina ahead of Fangio approaching the last corner. Ascari made a mistake and spun. To avoid him, Farina pulled to the grass but recovered later. Fangio pounced on this window of opportunity and took a famous win. Ascari claimed the World Championship for Drivers' for the second, and final, time.

== Entries ==
Team	No	Driver	Car	Engine	Tyre
(Italy) Scuderia Ferrari	2	(Italy) Luigi Villoresi	Ferrari Tipo 500	Ferrari 500 2.0 L4	P
(Italy) Scuderia Ferrari	4	(Italy) Alberto Ascari	Ferrari Tipo 500	Ferrari 500 2.0 L4	P
(Italy) Scuderia Ferrari	6	(Italy) Nino Farina	Ferrari Tipo 500	Ferrari 500 2.0 L4	P
(Italy) Scuderia Ferrari	8	(United Kingdom) Mike Hawthorn	Ferrari Tipo 500	Ferrari 500 2.0 L4	P
(Italy) Scuderia Ferrari	10	(Italy) Umberto Maglioli	Ferrari 553	Ferrari 553 2.0 L4	P
(Italy) Scuderia Ferrari	12	(Italy) Piero Carini	Ferrari 553	Ferrari 553 2.0 L4	P
(United Kingdom) HW Motors	14	(United Kingdom) Lance Macklin	HWM 53	Alta GP 2.5 L4	D
(United Kingdom) HW Motors	16	(France) Yves Giraud Cabantous	HWM 53	Alta GP 2.5 L4	D
(United Kingdom) HW Motors	18	(United States) John Fitch	HWM 53	Alta GP 2.5 L4	D
(United Kingdom) Connaught Engineering	20	(United Kingdom) Jack Fairman	Connaught Type A	Lea-Francis 2.0 L4	D
(United Kingdom) Connaught Engineering	22	(United Kingdom) Roy Salvadori	Connaught Type A	Lea-Francis 2.0 L4	D
(United Kingdom) Connaught Engineering	24	(United Kingdom) Kenneth McAlpine	Connaught Type A	Lea-Francis 2.0 L4	D
(Belgium) Ecurie Belge	26	(Belgium) Johnny Claes	Connaught Type A	Lea-Francis 2.0 L4	E
(United Kingdom) Cooper Car Company	28	(United Kingdom) Stirling Moss	Cooper T24	Alta GP 2.5 L4	D
(United Kingdom) Ken Wharton	30	(United Kingdom) Ken Wharton	Cooper T23	Bristol BS1 2.0 L6	D
(Monaco) Louis Chiron	32	(Monaco) Louis Chiron	OSCA 20	OSCA 2000 2.0 L6	P
(Italy) OSCA Automobili	34	(France) Élie Bayol	OSCA 20	OSCA 2000 2.0 L6	P
(France) Equipe Gordini	36	(France) Maurice Trintignant	Gordini Type 16	Gordini 20 2.0 L6	E
(France) Equipe Gordini	38	(United States) Harry Schell	Gordini Type 16	Gordini 20 2.0 L6	E
(France) Equipe Gordini	40	(Argentina) Roberto Mieres	Gordini Type 16	Gordini 20 2.0 L6	E
(Italy) Scuderia Milano	42	(Brazil) Chico Landi	Maserati A6GCM	Maserati A6 2.0 L6	P
(Italy) Scuderia Milano	44	(Thailand) Prince Bira	Maserati A6GCM	Maserati A6 2.0 L6	P
(United Kingdom) Equipe Anglaise	46	(United Kingdom) Alan Brown	Cooper T23	Bristol BS1 2.0 L6	D
(West Germany) Hans Stuck	48	(West Germany) Hans Stuck	AFM 6	Bristol BS1 2.0 L6	D
(Italy) Officine Alfieri Maserati	50	(Argentina) Juan Manuel Fangio	Maserati A6GCM	Maserati A6 2.0 L6	P
(Italy) Officine Alfieri Maserati	52	(Italy) Felice Bonetto	Maserati A6GCM	Maserati A6 2.0 L6	P
(Italy) Officine Alfieri Maserati	54	(Argentina) Onofre Marimón	Maserati A6GCM	Maserati A6 2.0 L6	P
(Italy) Officine Alfieri Maserati	56	(Italy) Sergio Mantovani	Maserati A6GCM	Maserati A6 2.0 L6	P
(Switzerland) Emmanuel de Graffenried	58	(Switzerland) Toulo de Graffenried	Maserati A6GCM	Maserati A6 2.0 L6	P
(France) Ecurie Rosier	64	(France) Louis Rosier	Ferrari Tipo 500	Ferrari 500 2.0 L4	D E

== Classification ==
=== Qualifying ===
Pos	No	Driver	Constructor	Time	Gap
1	4	(Italy) Alberto Ascari	Ferrari	2:02.7	—
2	50	(Argentina) Juan Manuel Fangio	Maserati	2:03.2	+ 0.5
3	6	(Italy) Nino Farina	Ferrari	2:03.9	+ 1.2
4	54	(Argentina) Onofre Marimón	Maserati	2:04.1	+ 1.4
5	2	(Italy) Luigi Villoresi	Ferrari	2:04.6	+ 1.9
6	8	(United Kingdom) Mike Hawthorn	Ferrari	2:04.9	+ 2.2
7	52	(Italy) Felice Bonetto	Maserati	2:05.1	+ 2.4
8	36	(France) Maurice Trintignant	Gordini	2:05.7	+ 3.0
9	58	(Switzerland) Toulo de Graffenried	Maserati	2:05.9	+ 3.2
10	28	(United Kingdom) Stirling Moss	Cooper-Alta	2:06.6	+ 3.9
11	10	(Italy) Umberto Maglioli	Ferrari	2:06.9	+ 4.2
12	56	(Italy) Sergio Mantovani	Maserati	2:07.5	+ 4.8
13	34	(France) Élie Bayol	OSCA	2:07.8	+ 5.1
14	22	(United Kingdom) Roy Salvadori	Connaught-Lea-Francis	2:08.0	+ 5.3
15	38	(United States) Harry Schell	Gordini	2:08.5	+ 5.8
16	40	(Argentina) Roberto Mieres	Gordini	2:08.8	+ 6.1
17	64	(France) Louis Rosier	Ferrari	2:08.9	+ 6.2
18	24	(United Kingdom) Kenneth McAlpine	Connaught-Lea-Francis	2:09.0	+ 6.3
19	30	(United Kingdom) Ken Wharton	Cooper-Bristol	2:09.3	+ 6.6
20	12	(Italy) Piero Carini	Ferrari	2:09.5	+ 6.8
21	42	(Brazil) Chico Landi	Maserati	2:09.7	+ 7.0
22	20	(United Kingdom) Jack Fairman	Connaught-Lea-Francis	2:09.9	+ 7.2
23	44	(Thailand) Prince Bira	Maserati	2:10.1	+ 7.4
24	46	(United Kingdom) Alan Brown	Cooper-Bristol	2:10.5	+ 7.8
25	32	(Monaco) Louis Chiron	OSCA	2:10.8	+ 8.1
26	18	(United States) John Fitch	HWM-Alta	2:11.0	+ 8.3
27	14	(United Kingdom) Lance Macklin	HWM-Alta	2:11.5	+ 8.8
28	16	(France) Yves Giraud Cabantous	HWM-Alta	2:11.9	+ 9.2
29	48	(West Germany) Hans Stuck	AFM-Bristol	2:13.0	+ 10.3
30	26	(Belgium) Johnny Claes	Connaught-Lea-Francis	2:14.6	+ 11.9

=== Race ===
Pos	No	Driver	Constructor	Laps	Time/Retired	Grid	Points
1	50	(Argentina) Juan Manuel Fangio	Maserati	80	2:49:45.9	2	9^{1}
2	6	(Italy) Nino Farina	Ferrari	80	+ 1.4	3	6
3	2	(Italy) Luigi Villoresi	Ferrari	79	+ 1 Lap	5	4
4	8	(United Kingdom) Mike Hawthorn	Ferrari	79	+ 1 Lap	6	3
5	36	(France) Maurice Trintignant	Gordini	79	+ 1 Lap	8	2
6	40	(Argentina) Roberto Mieres	Gordini	77	+ 3 Laps	16	
7	56	(Italy) Sergio Mantovani (Italy) Luigi Musso	Maserati	76	+ 4 Laps	12	
8	10	(Italy) Umberto Maglioli	Ferrari	75	+ 5 Laps	11	
9	38	(United States) Harry Schell	Gordini	75	+ 5 Laps	15	
10	32	(Monaco) Louis Chiron	OSCA	72	+ 8 Laps	25	
11	44	(Thailand) Prince Bira	Maserati	72	+ 8 Laps	23	
12	46	(United Kingdom) Alan Brown	Cooper-Bristol	70	+ 10 Laps	24	
13	28	(United Kingdom) Stirling Moss	Cooper-Alta	70	+ 10 Laps	10	
14	48	(Germany) Hans Stuck	AFM-Bristol	67	+ 13 Laps	29	
15	16	(France) Yves Giraud Cabantous	HWM-Alta	67	+ 13 Laps	28	
16	64	(France) Louis Rosier	Ferrari	65	+ 15 Laps	17	
Ret	4	(Italy) Alberto Ascari	Ferrari	79	Accident	1	
Ret	52	(Italy) Felice Bonetto	Maserati	77	Out of fuel	7	
Ret	54	(Argentina) Onofre Marimón	Maserati	75	Accident	4	
Ret	58	(Switzerland) Toulo de Graffenried	Maserati	70	Engine	9	
NC	20	(United Kingdom) Jack Fairman	Connaught-Lea-Francis	61	Not Classified	22	
NC	30	(United Kingdom) Ken Wharton	Cooper-Bristol	57	Not Classified	19	
NC	24	(United Kingdom) Kenneth McAlpine	Connaught-Lea-Francis	56	Not Classified	18	
Ret	12	(Italy) Piero Carini	Ferrari	40	Engine	20	
Ret	22	(United Kingdom) Roy Salvadori	Connaught-Lea-Francis	33	Throttle	14	
Ret	42	(Brazil) Chico Landi	Maserati	18	Engine	21	
Ret	34	(France) Élie Bayol	OSCA	17	Engine	13	
Ret	18	(United States) John Fitch	HWM-Alta	14	Engine	26	
Ret	26	(Belgium) Johnny Claes	Connaught-Lea-Francis	7	Fuel System	30	
Ret	14	(United Kingdom) Lance Macklin	HWM-Alta	6	Engine	27	

Notes

- ^1 – Includes 1 point for fastest lap

== Shared drive ==
- Car #56: Mantovani (38 laps) then Musso (38 laps)

== Final Championship standings ==
- **Bold text** indicates the World Champion.

Drivers' Championship standings

	Pos	Driver	Points
	1	(Italy) **Alberto Ascari**	34.5 (46.5)
1	2	(Argentina) Juan Manuel Fangio	28 (29.5)
1	3	(Italy) Nino Farina	26 (32)
	4	(United Kingdom) Mike Hawthorn	19 (27)
1	5	(Italy) Luigi Villoresi	17

- Note: Only the top five positions are included. Only the best 4 results counted towards the Championship. Numbers without parentheses are Championship points; numbers in parentheses are total points scored.

Previous race: 1953 Swiss Grand Prix	FIA Formula One World Championship; 1953 season	Next race: 1954 Argentine Grand Prix
Previous race: 1952 Italian Grand Prix	Italian Grand Prix	Next race: 1954 Italian Grand Prix
