= 1954 Argentine Grand Prix =

← Previous race	Next race →

Race details
- Date: 17 January 1954
- Official name: II Gran Premio de la Republica Argentina
- Location: Autódromo 17 de Octubre, Buenos Aires, Argentina
- Course: Permanent racing facility
- Course length: 3.912 km (2.431 miles)
- Distance: 87 laps, 340.344 km (211.480 miles)
- Weather: Overcast, wet

Pole position
Driver	(Italy) Nino Farina	Ferrari
- Time: 1:44.8

Fastest lap
Driver	(Argentina) José Froilán González	Ferrari
- Time: 1:48.2

Podium
First	(Argentina) Juan Manuel Fangio	Maserati
Second	(Italy) Nino Farina	Ferrari
Third	(Argentina) José Froilán González	Ferrari

The 1954 Argentine Grand Prix was a Formula One motor race held at Autódromo 17 de Octubre in Buenos Aires, Argentina on 17 January 1954. It was race 1 of 9 in the 1954 World Championship of Drivers. Giuseppe Farina scored the pole position at an age of 47 years and 79 days, which still is a record today.

Juan Manuel Fangio won the race, marking his first home victory. He would go on to win the Argentine Grand Prix in the following three years as well.

This race was unique in that the track was run in the opposite direction compared to all other editions.

== Entries ==
Team	No	Driver	Car	Engine	Tyre
(Italy) Officine Alfieri Maserati	2	(Argentina) Juan Manuel Fangio	Maserati 250F	Maserati 250F1 2.5 L6	P
(Italy) Officine Alfieri Maserati	4	(Argentina) Onofre Marimón	Maserati 250F	Maserati 250F1 2.5 L6	P
(Italy) Officine Alfieri Maserati	6	(Italy) Luigi Musso	Maserati 250F/Maserati A6GCM	Maserati 250F1 2.5 L6/Maserati A6 2.0 L6	P
(Italy) Officine Alfieri Maserati	8	(Thailand) Prince Bira	Maserati A6GCM	Maserati A6 2.0 L6	P
(Italy) Scuderia Ferrari	10	(Italy) Nino Farina	Ferrari 625 F1	Ferrari 625 2.5 L4	P
(Italy) Scuderia Ferrari	12	(Argentina) José Froilán González	Ferrari 625 F1	Ferrari 625 2.5 L4	P
(Italy) Scuderia Ferrari	14	(United Kingdom) Mike Hawthorn	Ferrari 625 F1	Ferrari 625 2.5 L4	P
(Italy) Scuderia Ferrari	16	(Italy) Umberto Maglioli	Ferrari 625 F1	Ferrari 625 2.5 L4	P
(France) Equipe Gordini	18	(France) Jean Behra	Gordini T16	Gordini 23 2.5 L6	E
(France) Equipe Gordini	20	(France) Élie Bayol	Gordini T16	Gordini 23 2.5 L6	E
(France) Equipe Gordini	22	(France) Roger Loyer	Gordini T16	Gordini 23 2.5 L6	E
(France) Ecurie Rosier	24	(France) Louis Rosier	Ferrari 625 F1	Ferrari 625 2.5 L4	P
(France) Ecurie Rosier	26	(France) Maurice Trintignant	Ferrari 625 F1	Ferrari 625 2.5 L4	P
(United States) Harry Schell	28	(United States) Harry Schell	Maserati A6GCM	Maserati A6 2.0 L6	P
(Switzerland) Emmanuel de Graffenried	30	(Switzerland) Toulo de Graffenried	Maserati A6GCM	Maserati A6 2.0 L6	P
(Argentina) Roberto Mieres	32	(Argentina) Roberto Mieres	Maserati A6GCM	Maserati A6 2.0 L6	P
(Argentina) Jorge Daponte	34	(Argentina) Jorge Daponte	Maserati A6GCM	Maserati A6 2.0 L6	P
(Argentina) Onofre Marimón	36	(Argentina) Carlos Menditeguy	Maserati A6GCM	Maserati A6 2.0 L6	P

== Classification ==
=== Qualifying ===
Pos	No	Driver	Constructor	Time	Gap
1	10	(Italy) Nino Farina	Ferrari	1:44.8	—
2	12	(Argentina) José Froilán González	Ferrari	1:44.9	+ 0.1
3	2	(Argentina) Juan Manuel Fangio	Maserati	1:45.6	+ 0.8
4	14	(United Kingdom) Mike Hawthorn	Ferrari	1:47.0	+ 2.2
5	26	(France) Maurice Trintignant	Ferrari	1:47.4	+ 2.6
6	4	(Argentina) Onofre Marimón	Maserati	1:47.4	+ 2.6
7	6	(Italy) Luigi Musso	Maserati	1:48.2	+ 3.4
8	32	(Argentina) Roberto Mieres	Maserati	1:49.0	+ 4.2
9	36	(Argentina) Carlos Menditeguy	Maserati	1:49.2	+ 4.4
10	8	(Thailand) Prince Bira	Maserati	1:49.3	+ 4.5
11	28	(United States) Harry Schell	Maserati	1:50.0	+ 5.2
12	16	(Italy) Umberto Maglioli	Ferrari	1:50.2	+ 5.4
13	30	(Switzerland) Toulo de Graffenried	Maserati	1:50.7	+ 5.9
14	24	(France) Louis Rosier	Ferrari	1:51.1	+ 6.3
15	20	(France) Élie Bayol	Gordini	1:51.6	+ 6.8
16	22	(France) Roger Loyer	Gordini	1:52.6	+ 7.8
17	18	(France) Jean Behra	Gordini	1:53.0	+ 8.2
18	34	(Argentina) Jorge Daponte	Maserati	1:56.7	+ 11.9

=== Race ===
Pos	No	Driver	Constructor	Laps	Time/Retired	Grid	Points
1	2	(Argentina) Juan Manuel Fangio	Maserati	87	3:00:55.8	3	8
2	10	(Italy) Nino Farina	Ferrari	87	+1:19.0	1	6
3	12	(Argentina) José Froilán González	Ferrari	87	+2:01.0	2	5^{1}
4	26	(France) Maurice Trintignant	Ferrari	86	+1 lap	5	3
5	20	(France) Élie Bayol	Gordini	85	+2 laps	15	2
6	28	(United States) Harry Schell	Maserati	84	+3 laps	11	
7	8	(Thailand) Prince Bira	Maserati	83	+4 laps	10	
8	30	(Switzerland) Toulo de Graffenried	Maserati	83	+4 laps	13	
9	16	(Italy) Umberto Maglioli	Ferrari	82	+5 laps	12	
DSQ	18	(France) Jean Behra	Gordini	61	Push Start	17	
DSQ	14	(United Kingdom) Mike Hawthorn	Ferrari	52	Push Start	4	
Ret	4	(Argentina) Onofre Marimón	Maserati	48	Engine	6	
Ret	32	(Argentina) Roberto Mieres	Maserati	37	Oil Leak	8	
Ret	22	(France) Roger Loyer	Gordini	19	Oil Pressure	16	
Ret	34	(Argentina) Jorge Daponte	Maserati	19	Gearbox	18	
Ret	24	(France) Louis Rosier	Ferrari	1	Accident	14	
DNS	6	(Italy) Luigi Musso	Maserati		Engine	7	
DNS	36	(Argentina) Carlos Menditeguy	Maserati		Engine	9	

Notes

- ^1 – Includes 1 point for fastest lap

== Championship standings after the race ==
Drivers' Championship standings

Pos	Driver	Points
1	(Argentina) Juan Manuel Fangio	8
2	(Italy) Nino Farina	6
3	(Argentina) José Froilán González	5
4	(France) Maurice Trintignant	3
5	(France) Élie Bayol	2

- Note: Only the top five positions are included. Only the best 5 results counted towards the Championship.

Previous race: 1953 Italian Grand Prix	FIA Formula One World Championship; 1954 season	Next race: 1954 Indianapolis 500
Previous race: 1953 Argentine Grand Prix	Argentine Grand Prix	Next race: 1955 Argentine Grand Prix
