= 1954 Swiss Grand Prix =

| ← Previous race | Next race → |
- Circuit Bremgarten track layout

Race details
- Date: 22 August 1954
- Official name: XIV Großer Preis der Schweiz
- Location: Bremgarten, Bern, Switzerland
- Course: Temporary street/road circuit
- Course length: 7.280 km (4.524 miles)
- Distance: 66 laps, 480.480 km (298.556 miles)
- Weather: Rain

Pole position
| Driver | (Argentina) José Froilán González | Ferrari |
- Time: 2:39.5

Fastest lap
| Driver | (Argentina) Juan Manuel Fangio | Mercedes |
- Time: 2:39.7 on lap 34

Podium
| First | (Argentina) Juan Manuel Fangio | Mercedes |
| Second | (Argentina) José Froilán González | Ferrari |
| Third | (Germany) Hans Herrmann | Mercedes |

The 1954 Swiss Grand Prix was a Formula One motor race held at Bremgarten on 22 August 1954. It was race 7 of 9 in the 1954 World Championship of Drivers. The 66-lap race was won by Mercedes driver Juan Manuel Fangio after he started from second position. José Froilán González finished second for the Ferrari team and Fangio's teammate Hans Herrmann came in third.

== Race report ==
The Mercedes dominance continued as Juan Manuel Fangio led from start to finish. Stirling Moss soon passed José Froilán González for 2nd and battled ferociously to catch Fangio. However, he was himself soon under pressure as Mike Hawthorn caught him. The two duelled furiously, which ended only when Moss' engine gave way. Hawthorn himself succumbed to fuel feed problems. Gonzalez thus ended in second, whilst Fangio lapped the entire field up to second, winning by nearly a minute. Hans Herrmann in the sister Mercedes took the final podium spot.

The Driver's championship was to be decided at this race. Works Ferrari driver José Froilán González needed to win to stay in contention to beat Mercedes driver Juan Manuel Fangio on points and after finishing 2nd to Fangio, he still had 23 1/7 points to Fangio's 42. With the rules in place at the time, González could not overhaul Fangio's total with 2 races left, and so the title went to Fangio for the 2nd time.

This would be the last F1 race in Switzerland. Following the 1955 Le Mans disaster the Swiss government banned all forms of motor racing. Two Swiss Grands Prix were subsequently held in 1975 (non-championship) and 1982 but both races took place at the Dijon-Prenois circuit in France.

There would not be any form of circuit motor racing in Switzerland for nearly sixty four years. In 2015, Switzerland lifted their ban on motor racing for electric vehicles only. The first race organized after the ban was lifted was a Formula E Championship race taking place in the streets of Zürich in 2018.

== Entries ==
| Team | No | Driver | Car | Engine | Tyre |
|---|---|---|---|---|---|
| (Belgium) Ecurie Francorchamps | 2 | (Belgium) Jacques Swaters | Ferrari 500 | Ferrari 500 2.0 L4 | E |
| (Germany) Daimler Benz AG | 4 | (Argentina) Juan Manuel Fangio | Mercedes-Benz W196 | Mercedes M196 2.5 L8 | C |
| (Germany) Daimler Benz AG | 6 | (Germany) Hans Herrmann | Mercedes-Benz W196 | Mercedes M196 2.5 L8 | C |
| (Germany) Daimler Benz AG | 8 | (Germany) Karl Kling | Mercedes-Benz W196 | Mercedes M196 2.5 L8 | C |
| (France) Equipe Gordini | 10 | (France) Jean Behra | Gordini T16 | Gordini 23 2.5 L6 | E |
| (France) Equipe Gordini | 12 | (Argentina) Clemar Bucci | Gordini T16 | Gordini 23 2.5 L6 | E |
| (France) Equipe Gordini | 14 | (United States) Fred Wacker | Gordini T16 | Gordini 23 2.5 L6 | E |
| (United Kingdom) Gilby Engineering | 16 | (United Kingdom) Roy Salvadori | Maserati 250F | Maserati 250F1 2.5 L6 | D |
| (United Kingdom) Owen Racing Organisation | 18 | (United Kingdom) Ken Wharton | Maserati 250F | Maserati 250F1 2.5 L6 | D |
| (Italy) Scuderia Ferrari | 20 | (Argentina) José Froilán González | Ferrari 553 Ferrari 625 F1 | Ferrari 554 2.5 L4 Ferrari 625 2.5 L4 | P |
| (Italy) Scuderia Ferrari | 22 | (United Kingdom) Mike Hawthorn | Ferrari 553 Ferrari 625 F1 | Ferrari 554 2.5 L4 Ferrari 625 2.5 L4 | P |
| (Italy) Scuderia Ferrari | 24 | (Italy) Umberto Maglioli | Ferrari 553 Ferrari 625 F1 | Ferrari 554 2.5 L4 Ferrari 625 2.5 L4 | P |
| (Italy) Scuderia Ferrari | 24 | (France) Robert Manzon | Ferrari 553 Ferrari 625 F1 | Ferrari 554 2.5 L4 Ferrari 625 2.5 L4 | P |
| (Italy) Scuderia Ferrari | 26 | (France) Maurice Trintignant | Ferrari 553 Ferrari 625 F1 | Ferrari 554 2.5 L4 Ferrari 625 2.5 L4 | P |
| (Italy) Officine Alfieri Maserati | 28 | (Italy) Sergio Mantovani | Maserati A6GCM Maserati 250F | Maserati A6 2.0 L6 Maserati 250F1 2.5 L6 | P |
| (Italy) Officine Alfieri Maserati | 30 | (Argentina) Roberto Mieres | Maserati A6GCM Maserati 250F | Maserati A6 2.0 L6 Maserati 250F1 2.5 L6 | P |
| (Italy) Officine Alfieri Maserati | 32 | (United Kingdom) Stirling Moss | Maserati A6GCM Maserati 250F | Maserati A6 2.0 L6 Maserati 250F1 2.5 L6 | P |
| (Italy) Officine Alfieri Maserati | 34 | (United States) Harry Schell | Maserati A6GCM Maserati 250F | Maserati A6 2.0 L6 Maserati 250F1 2.5 L6 | P |
| (Switzerland) Emmanuel de Graffenried | 36 | (Switzerland) Toulo de Graffenried | Maserati A6GCM | Maserati A6 2.0 L6 | P |

== Classification ==
=== Qualifying ===
| Pos | No | Driver | Constructor | Time | Gap |
|---|---|---|---|---|---|
| 1 | 20 | (Argentina) José Froilán González | Ferrari | 2:39.5 | — |
| 2 | 4 | (Argentina) Juan Manuel Fangio | Mercedes | 2:39.7 | + 0.2 |
| 3 | 32 | (United Kingdom) Stirling Moss | Maserati | 2:41.4 | + 1.9 |
| 4 | 26 | (France) Maurice Trintignant | Ferrari | 2:41.7 | + 2.2 |
| 5 | 8 | (Germany) Karl Kling | Mercedes | 2:41.9 | + 2.4 |
| 6 | 22 | (United Kingdom) Mike Hawthorn | Ferrari | 2:43.2 | + 3.7 |
| 7 | 6 | (Germany) Hans Herrmann | Mercedes | 2:45.0 | + 5.5 |
| 8 | 18 | (United Kingdom) Ken Wharton | Maserati | 2:46.2 | + 6.7 |
| 9 | 28 | (Italy) Sergio Mantovani | Maserati | 2:56.9 | + 17.4 |
| 10 | 12 | (Argentina) Clemar Bucci | Gordini | 3:04.1 | + 24.6 |
| 11 | 24 | (Italy) Umberto Maglioli | Ferrari | 3:08.2 | + 28.7 |
| 12 | 30 | (Argentina) Roberto Mieres | Maserati | 3:09.3 | + 29.8 |
| 13 | 34 | (United States) Harry Schell | Maserati | 3:12.1 | + 32.6 |
| 14 | 10 | (France) Jean Behra | Gordini | 3:16.4 | + 36.9 |
| 15 | 14 | (United States) Fred Wacker | Gordini | 3:20.3 | + 40.8 |
| 16 | 2 | (Belgium) Jacques Swaters | Ferrari | 3:20.4 | + 40.9 |
| 17 | 24 | (France) Robert Manzon | Ferrari | No time | — |
| DNA | 16 | (United Kingdom) Roy Salvadori | Maserati | No time | — |
| DNA | 36 | (Switzerland) Toulo de Graffenried | Maserati | No time | — |

=== Race ===
| Pos | No | Driver | Constructor | Laps | Time/retired | Grid | Points |
|---|---|---|---|---|---|---|---|
| 1 | 4 | (Argentina) Juan Manuel Fangio | Mercedes | 66 | 3:00:34.5 | 2 | 9^{1} |
| 2 | 20 | (Argentina) José Froilán González | Ferrari | 66 | +57.8 | 1 | 6 |
| 3 | 6 | (Germany) Hans Herrmann | Mercedes | 65 | +1 lap | 7 | 4 |
| 4 | 30 | (Argentina) Roberto Mieres | Maserati | 64 | +2 laps | 12 | 3 |
| 5 | 28 | (Italy) Sergio Mantovani | Maserati | 64 | +2 laps | 9 | 2 |
| 6 | 18 | (United Kingdom) Ken Wharton | Maserati | 64 | +2 laps | 8 | |
| 7 | 24 | (Italy) Umberto Maglioli | Ferrari | 61 | +5 laps | 11 | |
| 8 | 2 | (Belgium) Jacques Swaters | Ferrari | 58 | +8 laps | 16 | |
| Ret | 8 | (Germany) Karl Kling | Mercedes | 38 | Fuel system | 5 | |
| Ret | 26 | (France) Maurice Trintignant | Ferrari | 33 | Engine | 4 | |
| Ret | 22 | (United Kingdom) Mike Hawthorn | Ferrari | 30 | Oil leak | 6 | |
| Ret | 34 | (United States) Harry Schell | Maserati | 23 | Oil pump | 13 | |
| Ret | 32 | (United Kingdom) Stirling Moss | Maserati | 21 | Oil pump | 3 | |
| Ret | 14 | (United States) Fred Wacker | Gordini | 10 | Transmission | 15 | |
| Ret | 10 | (France) Jean Behra | Gordini | 8 | Clutch | 14 | |
| Ret | 12 | (Argentina) Clemar Bucci | Gordini | 0 | Fuel pump | 10 | |
| DNS | 24 | (France) Robert Manzon | Ferrari | | Accident | | |

Notes

- ^1 – Includes 1 point for fastest lap

== Championship standings after the race ==
- **Bold text** indicates the World Champion.

Drivers' Championship standings

| Pos | Driver | Points |
|---|---|---|
| 1 | (Argentina) **Juan Manuel Fangio** | 42 (45 1/7) |
| 2 | (Argentina) José Froilán González | 23 9/14 |
| 3 | (France) Maurice Trintignant | 15 |
| 4 | (United Kingdom) Mike Hawthorn | 10 9/14 |
| 5 | (Germany) Karl Kling | 10 |

- Note: Only the top five positions are included. Only the best 5 results counted towards the Championship. Numbers without parentheses are Championship points; numbers in parentheses are total points scored.

| Previous race: 1954 German Grand Prix | FIA Formula One World Championship; 1954 season | Next race: 1954 Italian Grand Prix |
| Previous race: 1953 Swiss Grand Prix | Swiss Grand Prix | Next race: 1975 Swiss Grand Prix |
