= Formula One drivers from Germany =

List of Formula One drivers who competed as German

- Drivers: 57
- Grands Prix: 996
- Entries: 2498
- Starts: 2362
- Best season finish: 1st (12 times: 1994, 1995, 2000, 2001, 2002, 2003, 2004, 2010, 2011, 2012, 2013, 2016)
- Wins: 179
- Podiums: 416
- Pole positions: 166
- Fastest laps: 159
- Points: 8061.5
- First entry: 1950 Italian Grand Prix
- First win: 1961 Dutch Grand Prix
- Latest win: 2019 Singapore Grand Prix
- Latest entry: 2026 Las Vegas Grand Prix
- 2026 drivers: Nico Hülkenberg

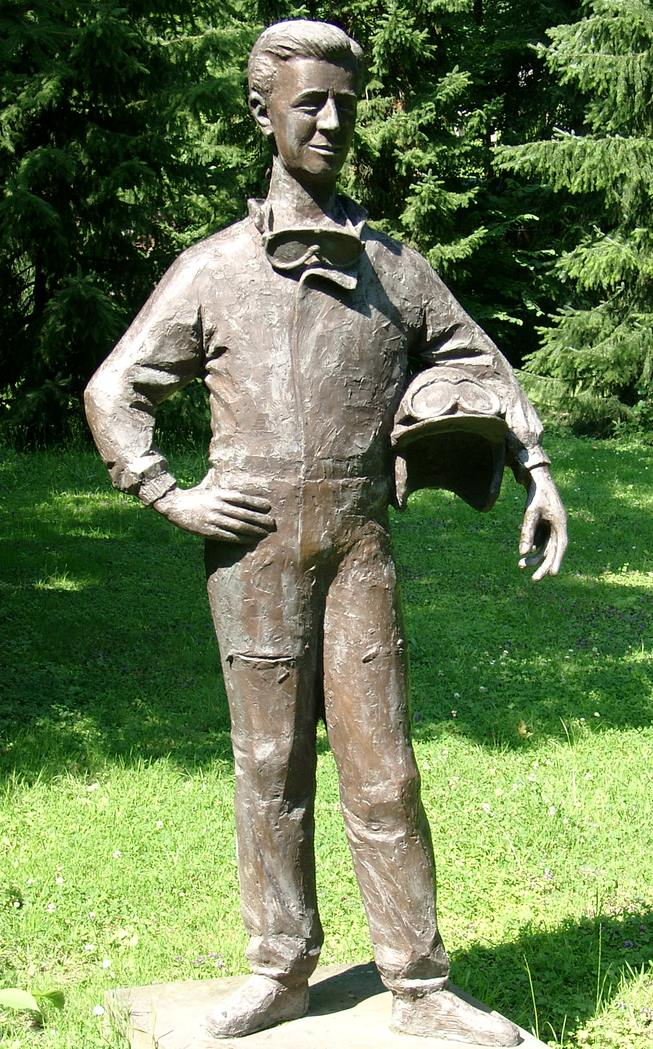
Statue of Wolfgang von Trips, the first German to win a Formula One race

There have been 57 Formula One drivers from Germany including three world champions. Michael Schumacher holds many records in F1 including the most world championship titles and the most consecutive titles. In 2008 Sebastian Vettel became the youngest ever driver to win a race (which was later broken) and, in 2010, became the youngest world championship winner. In 2016, Nico Rosberg became the third driver from Germany to win the F1 World Drivers' Championship. 1970 champion Jochen Rindt was born in Germany, but chose to race under the Austrian flag. Nico Hülkenberg is currently the only active German race driver in Formula One.

== World champions and race winners ==
Since the first season in 1950 Germany has produced three F1 World Drivers' Champions. The first title did not come until 1994 when Michael Schumacher claimed his first of seven championship victories. Sebastian Vettel is the second German drivers' champion, winning back-to-back titles in 2010, 2011, 2012 and 2013. Nico Rosberg is the third German drivers' champion, winning the title in 2016. Wolfgang von Trips was leading the championship in 1961 at the time of his fatal accident, and finished 2nd in the standings, just 1 point behind eventual champion Phil Hill.

There have been seven race winners from Germany, with Michael Schumacher having by far the most victories (91). Vettel scored 53 wins and Nico Rosberg won 23. Ralf Schumacher won six Grands Prix and Heinz-Harald Frentzen won three. Wolfgang von Trips, who became the first German driver to win a Grand Prix, won two races, both of which were in 1961. Jochen Mass won one.

List of German Formula One World Champions
Name	Year(s) of title(s)
Michael Schumacher	1994, 1995, 2000, 2001, 2002, 2003, 2004
Sebastian Vettel	2010, 2011, 2012, 2013
Nico Rosberg	2016

== Active drivers ==
Nico Hülkenberg joined F1 in 2010, replacing Rosberg in the Williams team. Despite some good performances he was dropped by the team for the following season and he became a test driver for Force India. For the 2012 season he was given a race seat, and he went on to achieve his career best result at the 2012 Belgian Grand Prix, finishing fourth. Continuing to race for Force India until the end of 2016, Hülkenberg then drove for Renault from 2017 to 2019, but was dropped by the team at the end of the season. In 2020, he drove three races for Racing Point, replacing drivers who were ill. In 2022, he drove two races for Aston Martin, replacing Sebastian Vettel, who was suffering from COVID-19. After Haas decided not to renew their contract with Mick Schumacher for 2023, the team decided to hire Hülkenberg to fill his place.

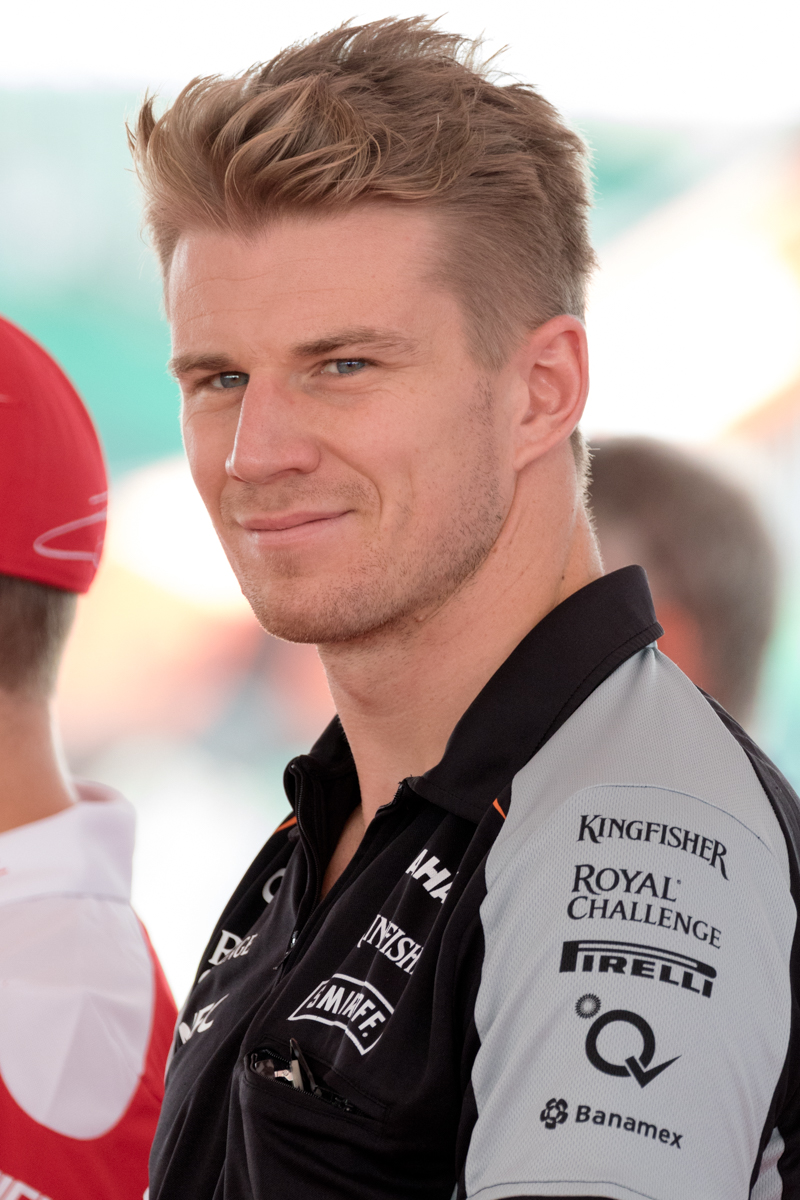
Nico Hülkenberg
2026 season position: 15th

== Former drivers ==
=== Notable former drivers ===
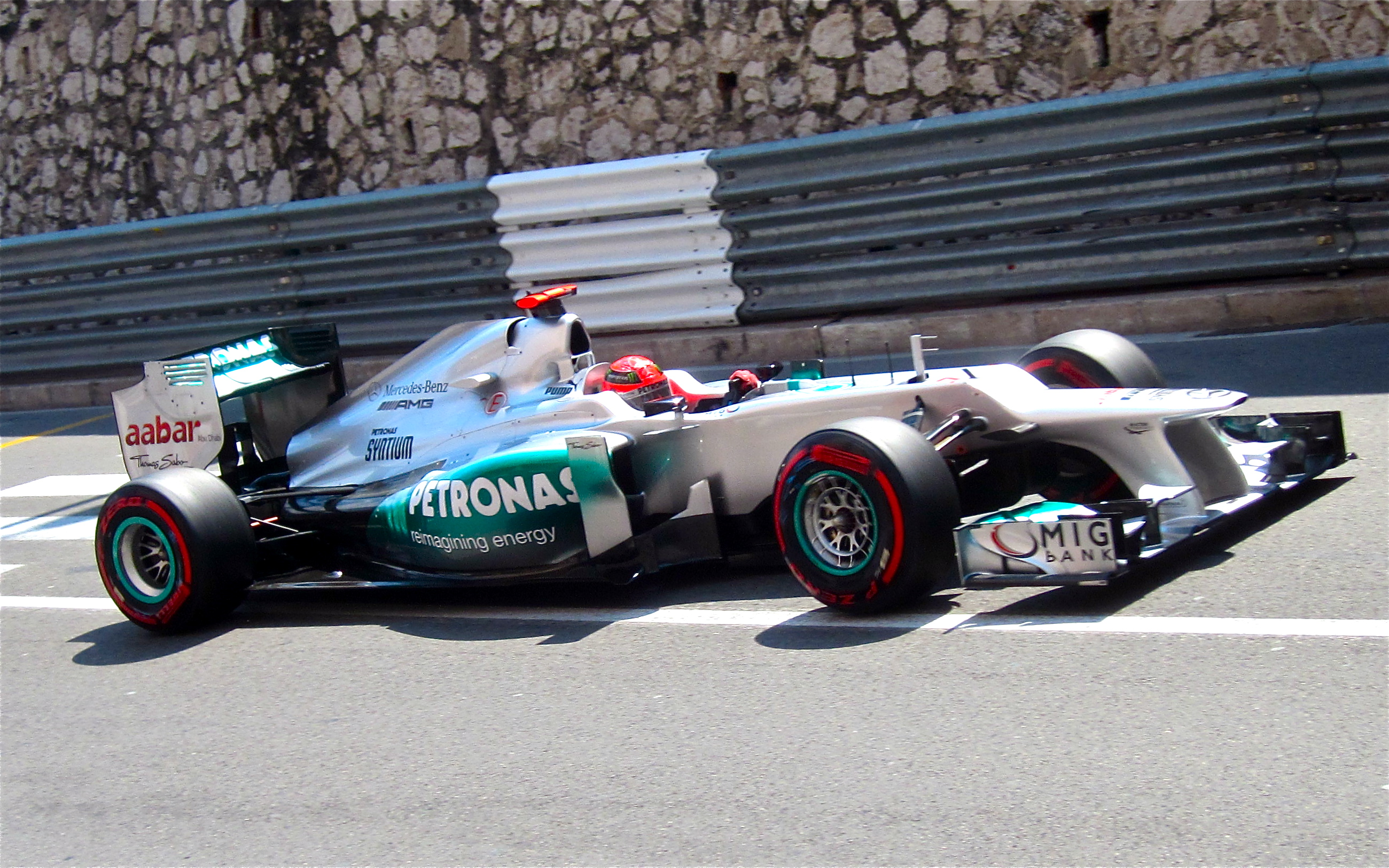
Michael Schumacher in Monaco, 2012

Michael Schumacher has often been listed as one of the greatest drivers in the history of Formula One and the "most dominant driver in the history of the sport". He is statistically one of the most successful drivers, holding many records including the most world championships and most fastest laps, and formerly held the record for most pole positions and most wins (both surpassed by Lewis Hamilton) and most points (surpassed by 8 drivers). He won an unprecedented seven world championship titles, firstly in 1994 and then his second in 1995. Those titles came while Schumacher was a driver for Benetton but in 1996 he left to join Ferrari, a team who were, at the time, in disarray and without a champion driver since 1979. Over the next few seasons Schumacher and Ferrari saw some success and some controversy, including his disqualification from the 1997 season. However, the combination eventually proved highly successful and Schumacher won five consecutive championships between 2000 and 2004.

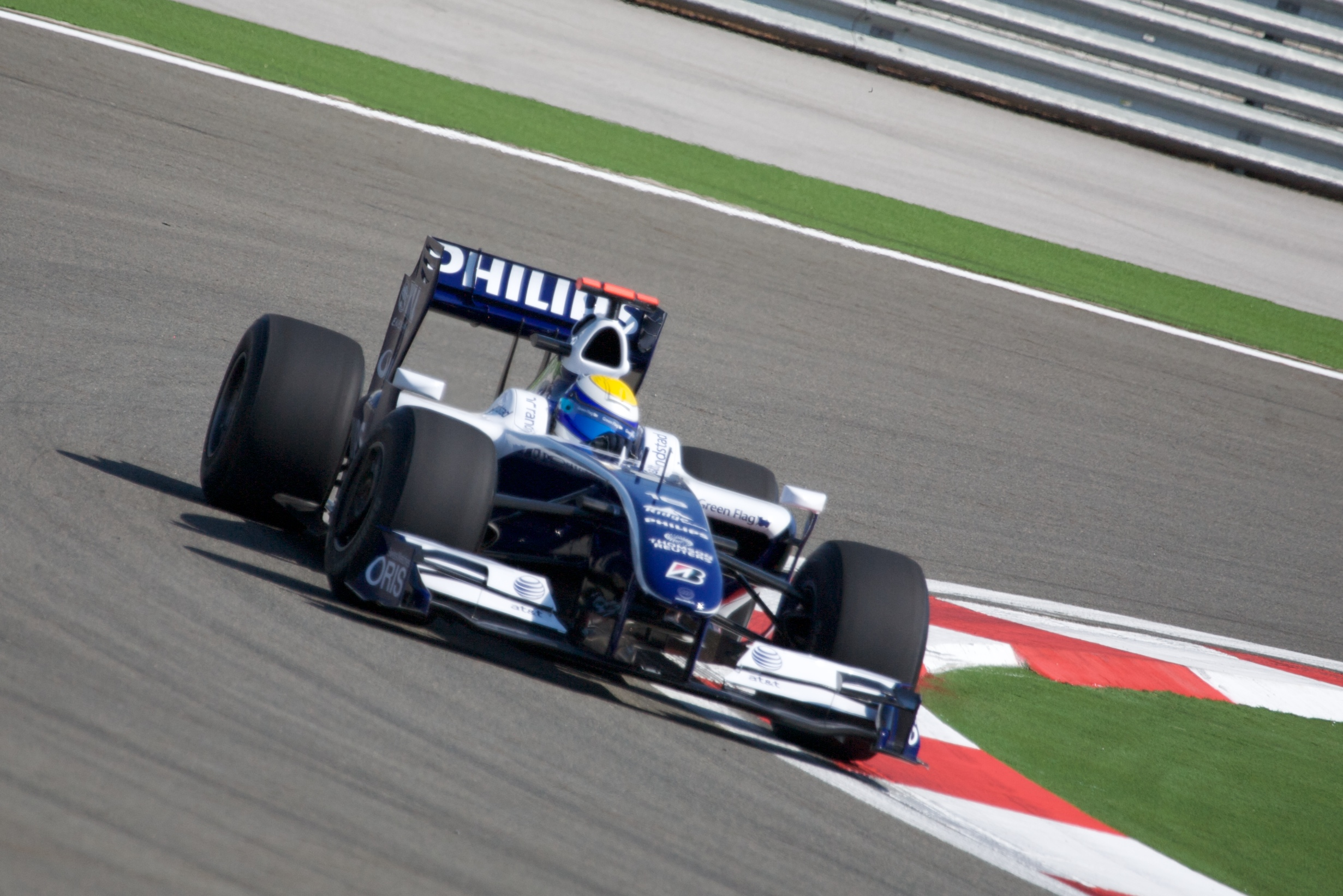
Rosberg driving for Williams at the 2009 Turkish Grand Prix

2016 World Champion Nico Rosberg, the son of 1982 World Champion Keke Rosberg, drove for Germany even though his father represented Finland. He joined Formula One as a driver with Williams before moving to Mercedes in 2010. He scored his first pole position at the 2012 Chinese Grand Prix and held on to win the race. He became the second son of a former champion to win a title.

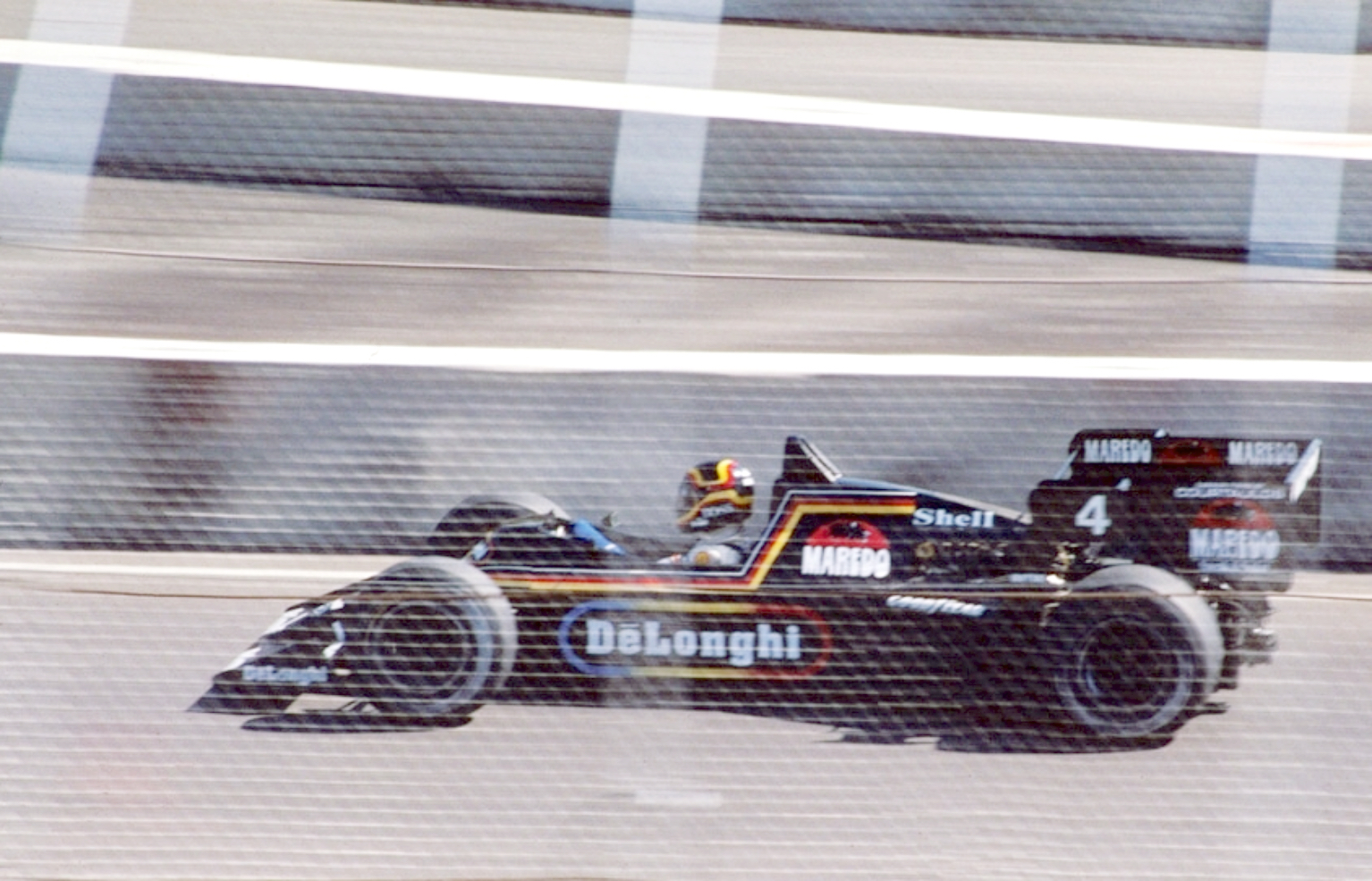
Stefan Bellof in a Tyrrell 012 at the 1984 Dallas Grand Prix

Stefan Bellof has been described as the "ultimate 'what-might-have-been' driver". He joined Formula One in 1984, the same year that saw Ayrton Senna join the sport. Senna's performance at the 1984 Monaco Grand Prix marked him out as an immensely talented driver, but Bellof's race had shown what potential the German had as well. Starting last on a very wet grid, Bellof quickly rose through the order, passing seven cars by the end of the first lap. He was in fourth place when the race was stopped due to safety concerns brought on by the weather. It would prove to be his best result in Formula One and, in 1985, Bellof died at the Circuit de Spa-Francorchamps while competing in the World Sportscar Championship. Former teammate Martin Brundle later said of Bellof "as it is with Ayrton, the good ones are taken from us far too young".

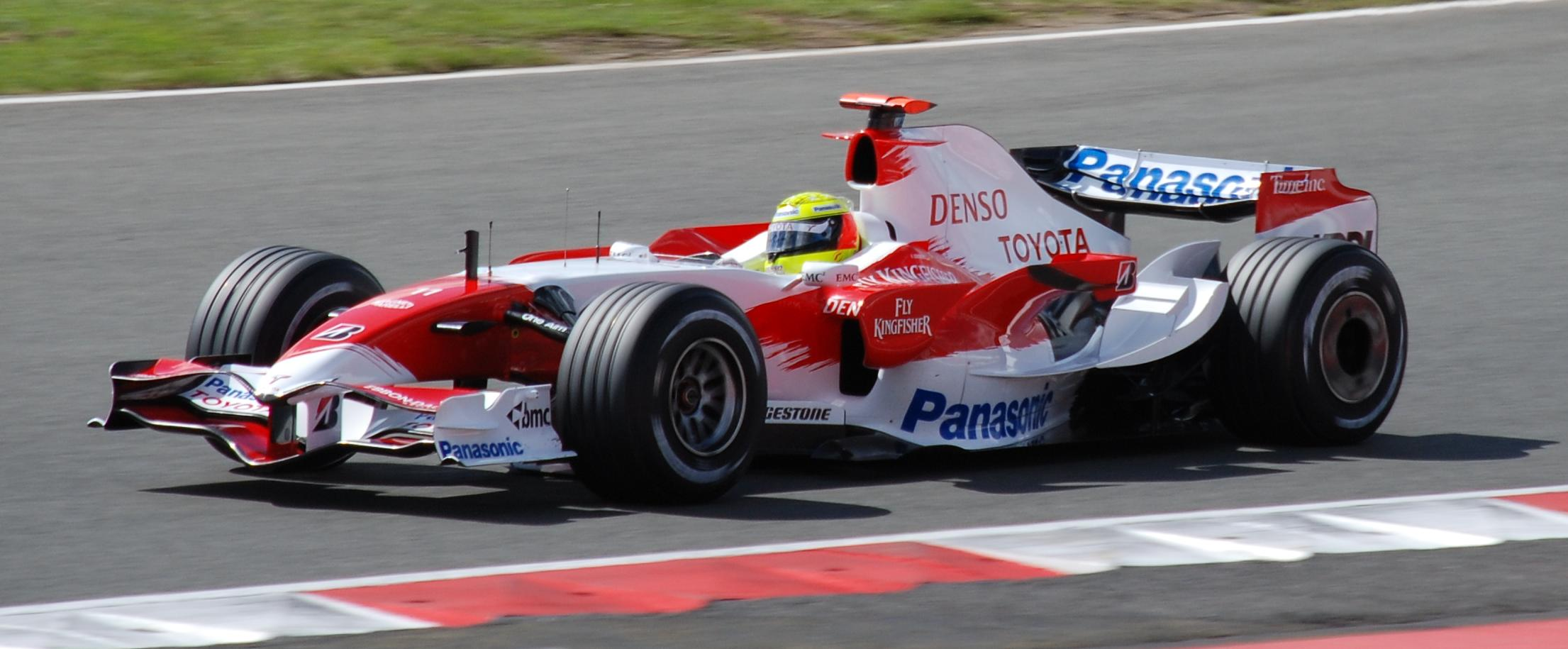
Schumacher driving for Toyota at the 2007 British Grand Prix

Ralf Schumacher, younger brother of Michael, won six Grands Prix in a career that spanned eleven seasons starting in 1997. All six wins came in the middle of his F1 career as a driver for Williams. Heinz-Harald Frentzen won three Grands Prix over ten seasons, once finishing in runner up in the drivers' championship thanks to the disqualification of Michael Schumacher in 1997 and 3rd in 1999.

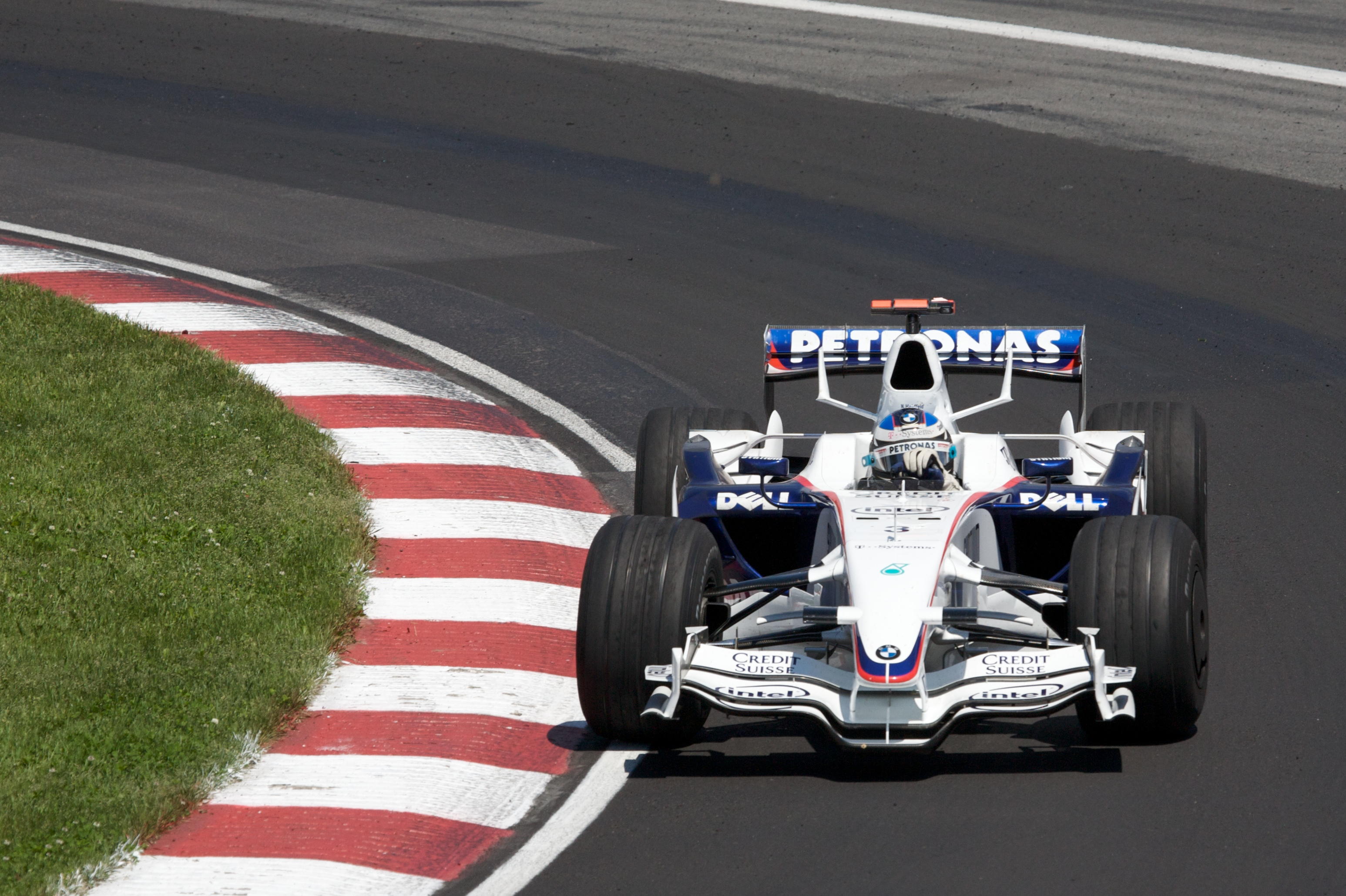
Heidfeld driving for BMW-Sauber at the 2008 Canadian Grand Prix

Nick Heidfeld holds the record for the most podium finishes without a win (13).

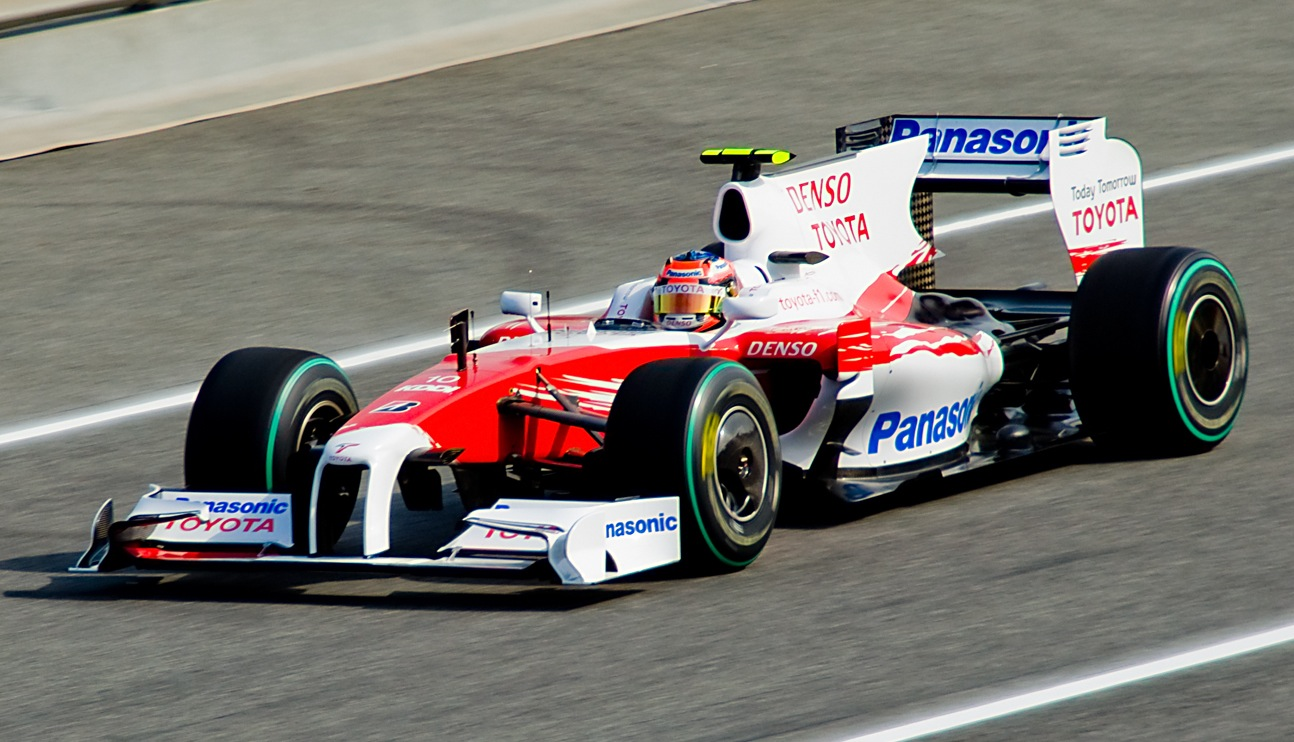
Glock driving for Toyota at the 2009 Spanish Grand Prix

Timo Glock was the third driver for Jordan in 2004 and was called up for racing duty when Giorgio Pantano was unable to drive due to a sponsorship dispute. Glock finished 7th, becoming one of only a handful of drivers who have scored championship points on their debut. He again would take over from Pantano for the final three races of the season but would not return to F1 until 2008.

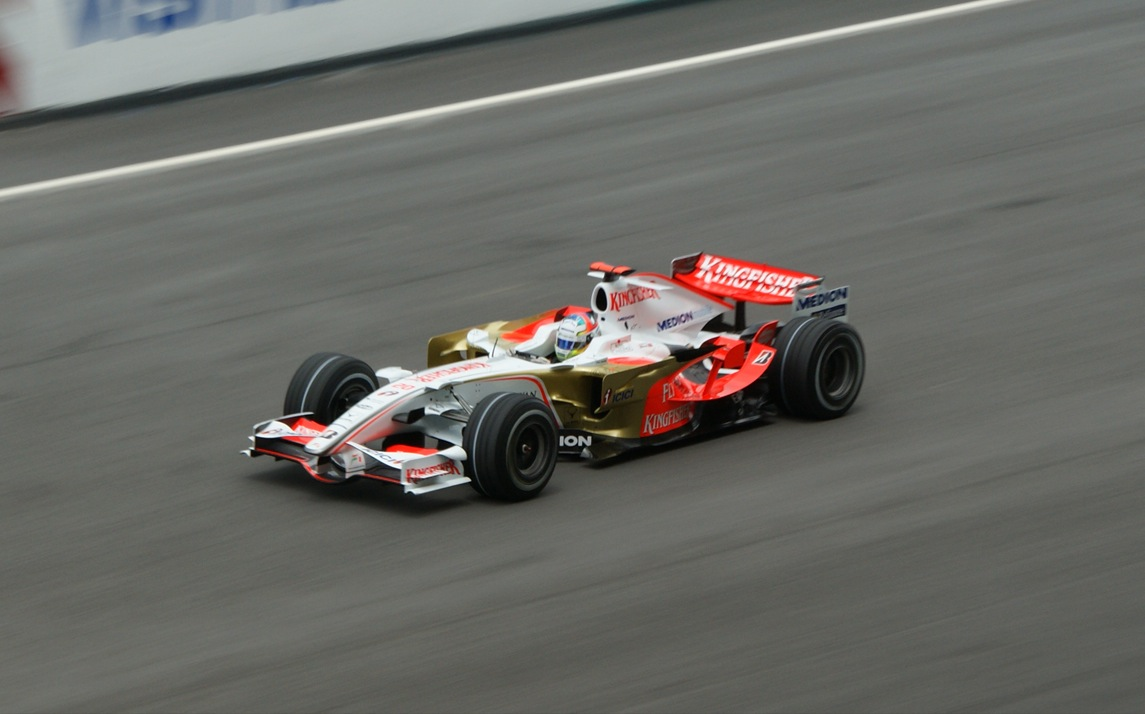
Sutil driving for Force India at the 2008 Malaysian Grand Prix

Adrian Sutil entered Formula One in 2007 with Spyker. He stayed with the team (which was renamed Force India for 2008) for the next four seasons, before a year out of the sport, and then returning to Force India in 2013. For 2014, Sutil moved to Sauber but was not retained for 2015.

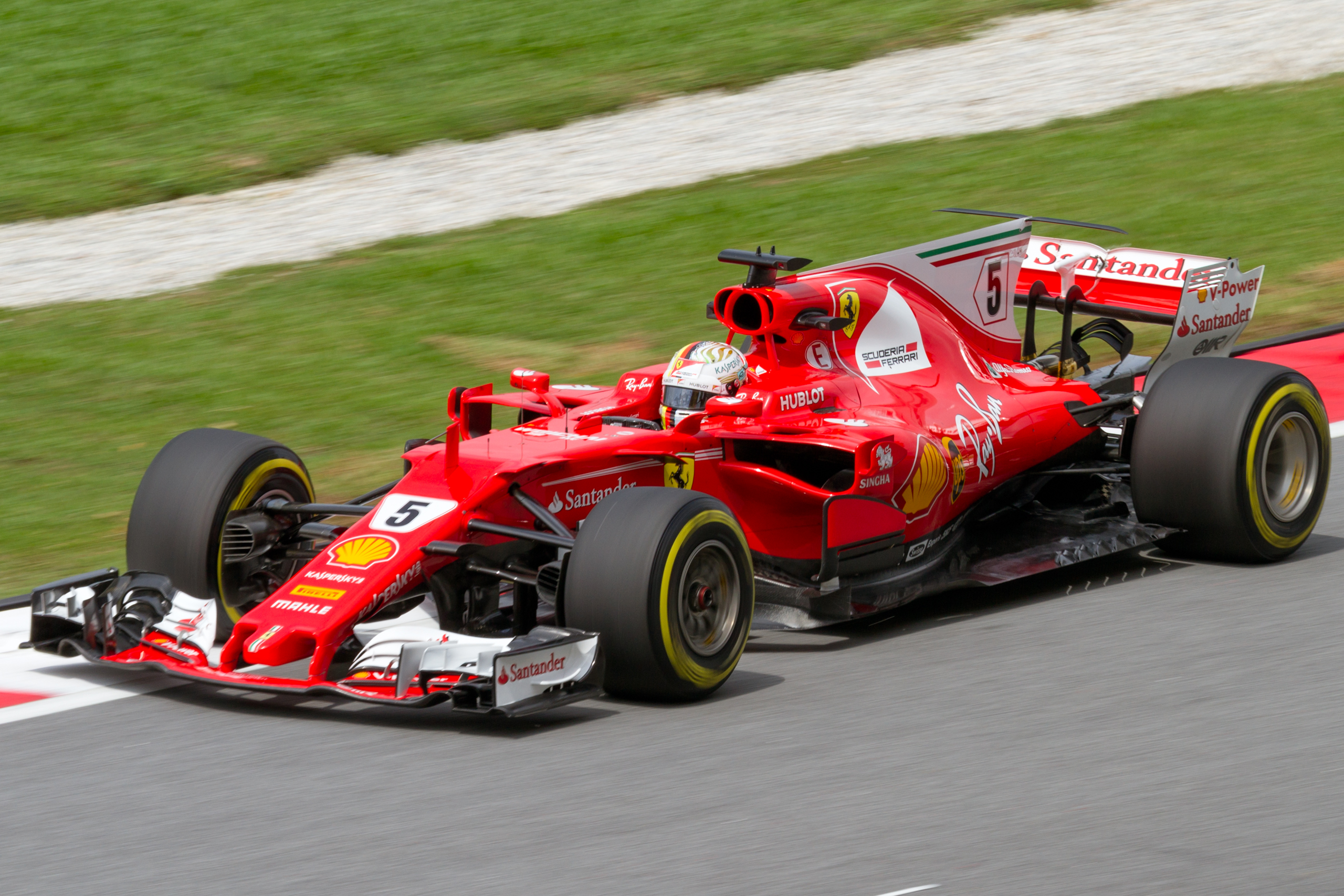
Vettel driving for Ferrari at the 2017 Malaysian Grand Prix

Sebastian Vettel won the World Championship in 2010, 2011, 2012 and 2013. He is the youngest driver to win the title. Vettel is seen as one of the greatest qualifiers in the sport and holds the record for the most consecutive front row starts, having qualified in first or second at 25 consecutive races. Vettel retired at the end of the 2022 season.

== Timeline ==
Drivers	Active Years	Entries	Wins	Podiums	Career Points	Poles	Fastest Laps	Championships
Paul Pietsch	1950–1952	3	0	0	0	0	0	0
Hans Stuck	1951–1953	5 (3 starts)	0	0	0	0	0	0
Adolf Brudes	1952	1	0	0	0	0	0	0
Ludwig Fischer	1952	1 (0 starts)	0	0	0	0	0	0
Hans Klenk	1952	1	0	0	0	0	0	0
Willi Krakau	1952	1 (0 starts)	0	0	0	0	0	0
Harry Merkel	1952	1 (0 starts)	0	0	0	0	0	0
Helmut Niedermayr	1952	1	0	0	0	0	0	0
Josef Peters	1952	1	0	0	0	0	0	0
Fritz Riess	1952	1	0	0	0	0	0	0
Toni Ulmen	1952	2	0	0	0	0	0	0
Karl-Gunther Bechem	1952–1953	2	0	0	0	0	0	0
Willi Heeks	1952–1953	2	0	0	0	0	0	0
Ernst Klodwig	1952–1953	2	0	0	0	0	0	0
Rudolf Krause	1952–1953	2	0	0	0	0	0	0
Theo Helfrich	1952–1954	3	0	0	0	0	0	0
Kurt Adolff	1953	1	0	0	0	0	0	0
Erwin Bauer	1953	1	0	0	0	0	0	0
Theo Fitzau	1953	1	0	0	0	0	0	0
Helm Glocker	1953	1 (0 starts)	0	0	0	0	0	0
Oswald Karch	1953	1	0	0	0	0	0	0
Ernst Loof	1953	1	0	0	0	0	0	0
Hermann Lang	1953–1954	2	0	0	2	0	0	0
Hans Herrmann	1953–1955, 1957–1961, 1966, 1969	21 (18 starts)	0	1	10	0	1	0
Edgar Barth	1953, 1957–1958, 1960, 1964	6 (5 starts)	0	0	0	0	0	0
Wolfgang Seidel	1953, 1958, 1960–1962	12 (10 starts)	0	0	0	0	0	0
Karl Kling	1954–1955	11	0	2	17	0	1	0
Wolfgang Von Trips	1956–1961	29 (27 starts)	2	6	56	1	0	0
Gunther Seiffert	1962	1 (0 starts)	0	0	0	0	0	0
Kurt Kuhnke	1963	1 (0 starts)	0	0	0	0	0	0
Gerhard Mitter	1963–1967, 1969	7 (5 starts)	0	0	3	0	0	0
Kurt Ahrens Jr.	1966–1969	4	0	0	0	0	0	0
Hubert Hahne	1966–1970	5 (3 starts)	0	0	0	0	0	0
Rolf Stommelen	1969–1976, 1978	63 (54 starts)	0	1	14	0	0	0
Jochen Mass	1973–1980, 1982	114 (105 starts)	1	8	71	0	2	0
Hans-Joachim Stuck	1974–1979	81 (74 starts)	0	2	29	0	0	0
Hans Heyer	1977	1	0	0	0	0	0	0
Manfred Winkelhock	1980, 1982–1985	56 (47 starts)	0	0	2	0	0	0
Stefan Bellof	1984–1985	22 (20 starts)	0	0	4	0	0	0
Christian Danner	1985–1987, 1989	47 (36 starts)	0	0	4	0	0	0
Bernd Schneider	1988–1990	34 (9 starts)	0	0	0	0	0	0
Volker Weidler	1989	10 (0 starts)	0	0	0	0	0	0
Joachim Winkelhock	1989	7 (0 starts)	0	0	0	0	0	0
Michael Bartels	1991	4 (0 starts)	0	0	0	0	0	0
Michael Schumacher	1991–2006, 2010–2012	308 (306 starts)	91	155	1566	68	77	7 (1994, 1995, 2000, 2001, 2002, 2003, 2004)
Heinz-Harald Frentzen	1994–2003	160 (156 starts)	3	18	174	2	6	0
Ralf Schumacher	1997–2007	182 (180 starts)	6	27	329	6	8	0
Nick Heidfeld	2000–2011	185 (183 starts)	0	13	259	1	2	0
Timo Glock	2004, 2008–2012	95 (91 starts)	0	3	51	0	1	0
Nico Rosberg	2006–2016	206	23	57	1594.5	30	20	1 (2016)
Markus Winkelhock	2007	1	0	0	0	0	0	0
Adrian Sutil	2007–2011, 2013–2014	128	0	0	124	0	1	0
Sebastian Vettel	2007–2022	300 (299 starts)	53	122	3098	57	38	4 (2010, 2011, 2012, 2013)
Nico Hulkenberg	2010, 2012–2020, 2022–2026	275 (269 starts)	0	1	636	1	2	0
Andre Lotterer	2014	1	0	0	0	0	0	0
Pascal Wehrlein	2016–2017	40 (39 starts)	0	0	6	0	0	0
Mick Schumacher	2021–2022	44 (43 starts)	0	0	12	0	0	0

== See also ==
- Formula One drivers from East Germany
- List of Formula One Grand Prix winners
