= BMW Grand Prix results =

These are the complete results achieved by BMW cars and engines in Formula One, including Formula Two races that were held concurrently.

== Complete Formula One results ==
=== As a constructor ===
(key)

Year	Entrant	Chassis	Engine	Tyres	Drivers	1	2	3	4	5	6	7	8	9	10	11	WCC	Points
1969	Bayerische Motoren Werke AG	BMW 269	BMW M12/1 1.6 L4	D		RSA	ESP	MON	NED	FRA	GBR	GER	ITA	CAN	USA	MEX	—N/a^{1}	
1969	Bayerische Motoren Werke AG	BMW 269	BMW M12/1 1.6 L4	D	(Germany) Hubert Hahne							DNS					—N/a^{1}	
1969	Bayerische Motoren Werke AG	BMW 269	BMW M12/1 1.6 L4	D	(Germany) Gerhard Mitter							DNS					—N/a^{1}	
1969	Bayerische Motoren Werke AG	BMW 269	BMW M12/1 1.6 L4	D	(Austria) Dieter Quester							DNS					—N/a^{1}	

Notes

- ^1 – Formula 2 entry.

=== As an engine supplier ===
(key)

Year	Entrant	Chassis	Engine	Tyres	Drivers	1	2	3	4	5	6	7	8	9	10	11	12	13	14	15	16	17	18	19	WCC	Points
1952	Tony Crook	Frazer-Nash 421	328 2.0 L6	D		SUI	500	BEL	FRA	GBR	GER	NED	ITA												—N/a^{2}	
1952	Tony Crook	Frazer-Nash 421	328 2.0 L6	D	(United Kingdom) Tony Crook					21															—N/a^{2}	
1952	Marcel Balsa	Balsa Spécial	328 2.0 L6	E	(France) Marcel Balsa						Ret														—N/a^{2}	
1952	Willi Heeks	AFM 8	328 2.0 L6	?	(Germany) Willi Heeks						Ret														—N/a^{2}	
1952	Helmut Niedermayr	AFM 6	328 2.0 L6	?	(Germany) Helmut Niedermayr						9														—N/a^{2}	
1952	Bernhard Nacke	Nacke Eigenbau	328 2.0 L6	?	(Germany) Günther Bechem						Ret														—N/a^{2}	
1952	Ludwig Fischer	AFM 8	328 2.0 L6	?	(Germany) Ludwig Fischer						DNS														—N/a^{2}	
1952	Willi Krakau	AFM 6	328 2.0 L6	?	(Germany) Willi Krakau						DNS														—N/a^{2}	
1952	Willi Krakau	Krakau Eigenbau	328 2.0 L6	?	(Germany) Harry Merkel						DNS														—N/a^{2}	
1952	Ernst Klodwig	Heck Eigenbau	328 2.0 L6	?	(Germany) Ernst Klodwig						12														—N/a^{2}	
1952	Rudolf Krause	Reif Eigenbau	328 2.0 L6	?	(Germany) Rudolf Krause						Ret														—N/a^{2}	
1953	Helmut Niedermayr	AFM U8	328 2.0 L6	D		ARG	500	NED	BEL	FRA	GBR	GER	SUI	ITA											—N/a^{2}	
1953	Helmut Niedermayr	AFM U8	328 2.0 L6	D	(Germany) Theo Fitzau							Ret													—N/a^{2}	
1953	Dora Greifzu	Greifzu Eigenbau	328 2.0 L6	D	(Germany) Rudolf Krause							14													—N/a^{2}	
1953	Ernst Klodwig	Heck Eigenbau	328 2.0 L6	D	(Germany) Ernst Klodwig							15													—N/a^{2}	
1953	Günther Bechem	AFM 50–5	328 2.0 L6	D	(Germany) Günther Bechem							Ret													—N/a^{2}	
1954	Hans Klenk	Klenk Meteor	328 2.0 L6	P		ARG	500	BEL	FRA	GBR	GER	SUI	ITA	ESP											—N/a^{2}	
1954	Hans Klenk	Klenk Meteor	328 2.0 L6	P	(Germany) Theo Helfrich						Ret														—N/a^{2}	
1955 – 1966: BMW did not supply engines to other teams.
1967	Bayerische Motoren Werke AG	Lola T100	M10 2.0 L4	D		RSA	MON	NED	BEL	FRA	GBR	GER	CAN	ITA	USA	MEX									—N/a^{3}	
1967	Bayerische Motoren Werke AG	Lola T100	M10 2.0 L4	D	(Germany) Hubert Hahne							Ret													—N/a^{3}	
1967	Lola Cars	Lola T100	M10 2.0 L4	F	(United Kingdom) David Hobbs							10													—N/a^{3}	
1968	Bayerische Motoren Werke AG	Lola T102	M12/1 1.6 L4	D		RSA	ESP	MON	BEL	NED	FRA	GBR	GER	ITA	CAN	USA	MEX								NC	0
1968	Bayerische Motoren Werke AG	Lola T102	M12/1 1.6 L4	D	(Germany) Hubert Hahne								10												NC	0
1969 – 1980: BMW did not supply engines to other teams.
1981	Parmalat Racing Team	Brabham BT50	M12/13 1.5 L4t	G		USW	BRA	ARG	SMR	BEL	MON	ESP	FRA	GBR	GER	AUT	NED	ITA	CAN	CPL					NC	0
1981	Parmalat Racing Team	Brabham BT50	M12/13 1.5 L4t	G	(Brazil) Nelson Piquet									PO											NC	0
1982	Parmalat Racing Team	Brabham BT50	M12/13 1.5 L4t	G		RSA	BRA	USW	SMR	BEL	MON	DET	CAN	NED	GBR	FRA	GER	AUT	SUI	ITA	CPL				7th	22
1982	Parmalat Racing Team	Brabham BT50	M12/13 1.5 L4t	G	(Brazil) Nelson Piquet	Ret				5	Ret	DNQ	1	2	Ret	Ret	Ret^{F}	Ret^{P}^{F}	4	Ret	Ret				7th	22
1982	Parmalat Racing Team	Brabham BT50	M12/13 1.5 L4t	G	(Italy) Riccardo Patrese	Ret				Ret				15	Ret	Ret^{F}	Ret	Ret	5	Ret	Ret				7th	22
1983	Fila Sport	Brabham BT52	M12/13 1.5 L4t	MI		BRA	USW	FRA	SMR	MON	BEL	DET	CAN	GBR	GER	AUT	NED	ITA	EUR	RSA					3rd	72
1983	Fila Sport	Brabham BT52	M12/13 1.5 L4t	MI	(Brazil) Nelson Piquet	1^{F}	Ret	2	Ret	2^{F}	4	4	Ret	2	13	3	Ret^{P}	1^{F}	1	3^{F}					3rd	72
1983	Fila Sport	Brabham BT52	M12/13 1.5 L4t	MI	(Italy) Riccardo Patrese	Ret	10	Ret	Ret^{F}	Ret	Ret	Ret	Ret	Ret	3	Ret	9	Ret^{P}	7	1					3rd	72
1983	Team ATS	ATS D6	M12/13 1.5 L4t	G	(Germany) Manfred Winkelhock	16	Ret	Ret	11	Ret	Ret	Ret	9	Ret	DNQ	Ret	DSQ	Ret	8	Ret					NC	0
1984	MRD International	Brabham BT53	M12/13 1.5 L4t	MI		BRA	RSA	BEL	SMR	FRA	MON	CAN	DET	DAL	GBR	GER	AUT	NED	ITA	EUR	POR				4th	38
1984	MRD International	Brabham BT53	M12/13 1.5 L4t	MI	(Brazil) Nelson Piquet	Ret	Ret^{P}	9	Ret^{P}^{F}	Ret	Ret	1^{P}^{F}	1^{P}	Ret	7^{P}	Ret	2^{P}	Ret	Ret^{P}	3^{P}^{F}	6^{P}				4th	38
1984	MRD International	Brabham BT53	M12/13 1.5 L4t	MI	(Italy) Teo Fabi	Ret	Ret	Ret	Ret	9			3		Ret	Ret	4	5	Ret	Ret					4th	38
1984	MRD International	Brabham BT53	M12/13 1.5 L4t	MI	(Italy) Corrado Fabi						Ret	Ret		7											4th	38
1984	MRD International	Brabham BT53	M12/13 1.5 L4t	MI	(Germany) Manfred Winkelhock																10				4th	38
1984	Team ATS	ATS D7	M12/13 1.5 L4t	P	(Germany) Manfred Winkelhock	EX	Ret	Ret	Ret	Ret	Ret	8	Ret	8	Ret	Ret	DNS	Ret	DNS						NC	0
1984	Team ATS	ATS D7	M12/13 1.5 L4t	P	(Austria) Gerhard Berger												12		6*	Ret	13				NC	0
1984	Barclay Nordica Arrows BMW	Arrows A7	M12/13 1.5 L4t	G	(Switzerland) Marc Surer				Ret					Ret	11	Ret	6	Ret	Ret	Ret	Ret				9th	3
1984	Barclay Nordica Arrows BMW	Arrows A7	M12/13 1.5 L4t	G	(Belgium) Thierry Boutsen			Ret		11	DNQ	Ret	Ret	Ret	Ret	Ret	5	Ret	10	9	Ret				9th	3
1985	Motor Racing Developments	Brabham BT54	M12/13 1.5 L4t	P		BRA	POR	SMR	MON	CAN	DET	FRA	GBR	GER	AUT	NED	ITA	BEL	EUR	RSA	AUS				5th	26
1985	Motor Racing Developments	Brabham BT54	M12/13 1.5 L4t	P	(Brazil) Nelson Piquet	Ret	Ret	8	Ret	Ret	6	1	4	Ret	Ret	8^{P}	2	5	Ret	Ret	Ret				5th	26
1985	Motor Racing Developments	Brabham BT54	M12/13 1.5 L4t	P	(France) François Hesnault	Ret	Ret	Ret	DNQ																5th	26
1985	Motor Racing Developments	Brabham BT54	M12/13 1.5 L4t	P	(Switzerland) Marc Surer					15	8	8	6	Ret	6	10	4	8	Ret	Ret	Ret				5th	26
1985	Barclay Arrows BMW	Arrows A8	M12/13 1.5 L4t	G	(Austria) Gerhard Berger	Ret	Ret	Ret	Ret	13	11	Ret	8	7	Ret	9	Ret	7	10	5	6				8th	14
1985	Barclay Arrows BMW	Arrows A8	M12/13 1.5 L4t	G	(Belgium) Thierry Boutsen	11	Ret	2	9	9	7	9	Ret	4	8	Ret	9	10	6	6	Ret				8th	14
1986	Motor Racing Developments	Brabham BT54; Brabham BT55	M12/13/1 1.5 L4t	P		BRA	ESP	SMR	MON	BEL	CAN	DET	FRA	GBR	GER	HUN	AUT	ITA	POR	MEX	AUS				9th	2
1986	Motor Racing Developments	Brabham BT54; Brabham BT55	M12/13/1 1.5 L4t	P	(Italy) Riccardo Patrese	Ret	Ret	6	Ret	8	Ret	6	7	Ret	Ret	Ret	Ret	Ret	Ret	13	Ret				9th	2
1986	Motor Racing Developments	Brabham BT54; Brabham BT55	M12/13/1 1.5 L4t	P	(Italy) Elio de Angelis	8	Ret	Ret	Ret																9th	2
1986	Motor Racing Developments	Brabham BT54; Brabham BT55	M12/13/1 1.5 L4t	P	(United Kingdom) Derek Warwick						Ret	10	9	8	7	Ret	DNS	Ret	Ret	Ret	Ret				9th	2
1986	Barclay Arrows BMW	Arrows A8; Arrows A9	M12/13 1.5 L4t	G	(Switzerland) Marc Surer	Ret	Ret	9	9	9															10th	1
1986	Barclay Arrows BMW	Arrows A8; Arrows A9	M12/13 1.5 L4t	G	(Germany) Christian Danner							Ret	11	DNS	Ret	Ret	6	8	11	9	Ret				10th	1
1986	Barclay Arrows BMW	Arrows A8; Arrows A9	M12/13 1.5 L4t	G	(Belgium) Thierry Boutsen	Ret	7	7	8	Ret	Ret	Ret	NC	NC	Ret	Ret	Ret	7	10	7	Ret				10th	1
1986	Benetton Formula Ltd	Benetton B186	M12/13 1.5 L4t	P	(Italy) Teo Fabi	10	5	Ret	Ret	7	Ret	Ret	Ret	Ret	Ret	Ret	Ret^{P}	Ret^{P}^{F}	8	Ret	10				6th	19
1986	Benetton Formula Ltd	Benetton B186	M12/13 1.5 L4t	P	(Austria) Gerhard Berger	6	6	3	Ret	10	Ret	Ret	Ret	Ret	10^{F}	Ret	7^{F}	5	Ret	1	Ret				6th	19
1987	Motor Racing Developments	Brabham BT56	M12/13/1 1.5 L4t	G		BRA	SMR	BEL	MON	DET	FRA	GBR	GER	HUN	AUT	ITA	POR	ESP	MEX	JPN	AUS				8th	10
1987	Motor Racing Developments	Brabham BT56	M12/13/1 1.5 L4t	G	(Italy) Riccardo Patrese	Ret	9	Ret	Ret	9	Ret	Ret	Ret	5	Ret	Ret	Ret	13	3	11					8th	10
1987	Motor Racing Developments	Brabham BT56	M12/13/1 1.5 L4t	G	(Italy) Stefano Modena																Ret				8th	10
1987	Motor Racing Developments	Brabham BT56	M12/13/1 1.5 L4t	G	(Italy) Andrea de Cesaris	Ret	Ret	3	Ret	Ret	Ret	Ret	Ret	Ret	Ret	Ret	Ret	Ret	Ret	Ret	8				8th	10
1987	USF&G Arrows Megatron	Arrows A10	Megatron M12/13 1.5 L4t	G	(United Kingdom) Derek Warwick	Ret	11	Ret	Ret	Ret	Ret	5	Ret	6	Ret	Ret	13	10	Ret	10	Ret				7th	11
1987	USF&G Arrows Megatron	Arrows A10	Megatron M12/13 1.5 L4t	G	(United States) Eddie Cheever	Ret	Ret	4	Ret	6	Ret	Ret	Ret	8	Ret	Ret	6	8	4	9	Ret				7th	11
1987	Ligier Loto	Ligier JS29B; Ligier JS29C	Megatron M12/13 1.5 L4t	G	(France) René Arnoux		DNS	6	11	10	Ret	Ret	Ret	Ret	10	10	Ret	Ret	Ret	Ret	Ret				11th	1
1987	Ligier Loto	Ligier JS29B; Ligier JS29C	Megatron M12/13 1.5 L4t	G	(Italy) Piercarlo Ghinzani		Ret	7	12	NC	Ret	EX	Ret	12	8	8	Ret	Ret	Ret	13	Ret				11th	1
1988	USF&G Arrows Megatron	Arrows A10; Arrows A10B	Megatron M12/13 1.5 L4t	G		BRA	SMR	MON	MEX	CAN	DET	FRA	GBR	GER	HUN	BEL	ITA	POR	ESP	JPN	AUS				5th	23
1988	USF&G Arrows Megatron	Arrows A10; Arrows A10B	Megatron M12/13 1.5 L4t	G	(United Kingdom) Derek Warwick	4	9	4	5	7	Ret	Ret	6	7	Ret	5	4	4	Ret	Ret	Ret				5th	23
1988	USF&G Arrows Megatron	Arrows A10; Arrows A10B	Megatron M12/13 1.5 L4t	G	(United States) Eddie Cheever	8	7	Ret	6	Ret	Ret	11	7	10	Ret	6	3	Ret	Ret	Ret	Ret				5th	23
1989 – 1999: BMW did not supply engines to other teams.
2000	BMW WilliamsF1 Team	Williams FW22	E41 3.0 V10	B		AUS	BRA	SMR	GBR	ESP	EUR	MON	CAN	FRA	AUT	GER	HUN	BEL	ITA	USA	JPN	MAL			3rd	36
2000	BMW WilliamsF1 Team	Williams FW22	E41 3.0 V10	B	(Germany) Ralf Schumacher	3	5	Ret	4	4	Ret	Ret	14^{†}	5	Ret	7	5	3	3	Ret	Ret	Ret			3rd	36
2000	BMW WilliamsF1 Team	Williams FW22	E41 3.0 V10	B	(United Kingdom) Jenson Button	Ret	6	Ret	5	17^{†}	10^{†}	Ret	11	8	5	4	9	5	Ret	Ret	5	Ret			3rd	36
2001	BMW WilliamsF1 Team	Williams FW23	P80 3.0 V10	MI		AUS	MAL	BRA	SMR	ESP	AUT	MON	CAN	EUR	FRA	GBR	GER	HUN	BEL	ITA	USA	JPN			3rd	80
2001	BMW WilliamsF1 Team	Williams FW23	P80 3.0 V10	MI	(Germany) Ralf Schumacher	Ret	5	Ret^{F}	1^{F}	Ret	Ret	Ret	1^{F}	4	2^{P}	Ret	1	4	8	3^{F}	Ret	6^{F}			3rd	80
2001	BMW WilliamsF1 Team	Williams FW23	P80 3.0 V10	MI	(Colombia) Juan Pablo Montoya	Ret	Ret	Ret	Ret	2	Ret	Ret	Ret	2^{F}	Ret	4	Ret^{P}^{F}	8	Ret^{P}	1^{P}	Ret^{F}	2			3rd	80
2002	BMW WilliamsF1 Team	Williams FW24	P82 3.0 V10	MI		AUS	MAL	BRA	SMR	ESP	AUT	MON	CAN	EUR	GBR	FRA	GER	HUN	BEL	ITA	USA	JPN			2nd	92
2002	BMW WilliamsF1 Team	Williams FW24	P82 3.0 V10	MI	(Germany) Ralf Schumacher	Ret	1	2	3	11^{†}	4	3	7	4	8	5	3	3	5	Ret	16	11^{†}			2nd	92
2002	BMW WilliamsF1 Team	Williams FW24	P82 3.0 V10	MI	(Colombia) Juan Pablo Montoya	2	2^{F}	5^{P}^{F}	4	2	3	Ret^{P}	Ret^{P}^{F}	Ret^{P}	3^{P}	4^{P}	2	11	3	Ret^{P}	4	4			2nd	92
2003	BMW WilliamsF1 Team	Williams FW25	P83 3.0 V10	MI		AUS	MAL	BRA	SMR	ESP	AUT	MON	CAN	EUR	FRA	GBR	GER	HUN	ITA	USA	JPN				2nd	144
2003	BMW WilliamsF1 Team	Williams FW25	P83 3.0 V10	MI	(Colombia) Juan Pablo Montoya	2	12	Ret	7	4	Ret	1	3	2	2^{F}	2	1^{P}^{F}	3^{F}	2	6	Ret				2nd	144
2003	BMW WilliamsF1 Team	Williams FW25	P83 3.0 V10	MI	(Germany) Ralf Schumacher	8	4	7	4	5	6	4^{P}	2^{P}	1	1^{P}	9	Ret	4	PO	Ret	12^{F}				2nd	144
2003	BMW WilliamsF1 Team	Williams FW25	P83 3.0 V10	MI	(Spain) Marc Gené														5						2nd	144
2004	BMW WilliamsF1 Team	Williams FW26	P84 3.0 V10	MI		AUS	MAL	BHR	SMR	ESP	MON	EUR	CAN	USA	FRA	GBR	GER	HUN	BEL	ITA	CHN	JPN	BRA		4th	88
2004	BMW WilliamsF1 Team	Williams FW26	P84 3.0 V10	MI	(Colombia) Juan Pablo Montoya	5	2^{F}	13	3	Ret	4	8	DSQ	DSQ	8	5	5	4	Ret	5	5	7	1^{F}		4th	88
2004	BMW WilliamsF1 Team	Williams FW26	P84 3.0 V10	MI	(Germany) Ralf Schumacher	4	Ret	7	7	6	10^{†}	Ret	DSQ^{P}	Ret							Ret	2	5		4th	88
2004	BMW WilliamsF1 Team	Williams FW26	P84 3.0 V10	MI	(Spain) Marc Gené										10	12									4th	88
2004	BMW WilliamsF1 Team	Williams FW26	P84 3.0 V10	MI	(Brazil) Antônio Pizzonia												7	7	Ret	7					4th	88
2005	BMW WilliamsF1 Team	Williams FW27	P84/85 3.0 V10	MI		AUS	MAL	BHR	SMR	ESP	MON	EUR	CAN	USA	FRA	GBR	GER	HUN	TUR	ITA	BEL	BRA	JPN	CHN	5th	66
2005	BMW WilliamsF1 Team	Williams FW27	P84/85 3.0 V10	MI	(Australia) Mark Webber	5	Ret	6	7	6	3	Ret	5	DNS	12	11	NC	7	Ret	14	4	NC	4	7	5th	66
2005	BMW WilliamsF1 Team	Williams FW27	P84/85 3.0 V10	MI	(Germany) Nick Heidfeld	Ret	3	Ret	6	10	2	2^{P}	Ret	DNS	14	12	11	6	Ret						5th	66
2005	BMW WilliamsF1 Team	Williams FW27	P84/85 3.0 V10	MI	(Brazil) Antônio Pizzonia															7	15^{†}	Ret	Ret	13^{†}	5th	66

Notes

- ^2 – The Constructors World Championship did not exist before 1958.
- ^3 – Ineligible for the Constructors World Championship.
- ^{*} Ineligible for points.

=== Non-championship results ===
Year	Entrant	Chassis	Engine	Tyres	Drivers	1	2	3	4	5	6
1967	Bayerische Motoren Werke AG	Lola T100	M12 2.0 L4	D		ROC	SPR	INT	SYR	OUL	ESP
1967	Bayerische Motoren Werke AG	Lola T100	M12 2.0 L4	D	(Switzerland) Jo Siffert						Ret
1967	Bayerische Motoren Werke AG	Lola T100	M12 2.0 L4	D	(Germany) Hubert Hahne						Ret
1968	Frank Lythgoe Racing	Brabham BT21	M12 2.0 L4	F		ROC	INT	OUL			
1968	Frank Lythgoe Racing	Brabham BT21	M12 2.0 L4	F	(United Kingdom) Peter Gethin	NC					
1968	Lola Cars	Lola T100	M12 2.0 L4	F	(United Kingdom) John Surtees	DNS					
1983	Fila Sport	Brabham BT52	M12/13 1.5 L4t	MI		ROC					
1983	Fila Sport	Brabham BT52	M12/13 1.5 L4t	MI	(Mexico) Héctor Rebaque	Ret					

=== As BMW Sauber (2006–2009) ===
(key)

Year	Chassis	Engine	Tyres	Drivers	1	2	3	4	5	6	7	8	9	10	11	12	13	14	15	16	17	18	Points	WCC
2006	F1.06	BMW P86 2.4 V8	MI		BHR	MAL	AUS	SMR	EUR	ESP	MON	GBR	CAN	USA	FRA	GER	HUN	TUR	ITA	CHN	JPN	BRA	36	5th
2006	F1.06	BMW P86 2.4 V8	MI	(Germany) Nick Heidfeld	12	Ret	4	13	10	8	7	7	7	Ret	8	Ret	3	14	8	7	8	17^{†}	36	5th
2006	F1.06	BMW P86 2.4 V8	MI	(Canada) Jacques Villeneuve	Ret	7	6	12	8	12	14	8	Ret	Ret	11	Ret							36	5th
2006	F1.06	BMW P86 2.4 V8	MI	(Poland) Robert Kubica													DSQ	12	3	13	9	9	36	5th
2007	F1.07	BMW P86/7 2.4 V8	B		AUS	MAL	BHR	ESP	MON	CAN	USA	FRA	GBR	EUR	HUN	TUR	ITA	BEL	JPN	CHN	BRA		101	2nd
2007	F1.07	BMW P86/7 2.4 V8	B	(Germany) Nick Heidfeld	4	4	4	Ret	6	2	Ret	5	6	6	3	4	4	5	14^{†}	7	6		101	2nd
2007	F1.07	BMW P86/7 2.4 V8	B	(Poland) Robert Kubica	Ret	18	6	4	5	Ret		4	4	7	5	8	5	9	7	Ret	5		101	2nd
2007	F1.07	BMW P86/7 2.4 V8	B	(Germany) Sebastian Vettel							8												101	2nd
2008	F1.08	BMW P86/8 2.4 V8	B		AUS	MAL	BHR	ESP	TUR	MON	CAN	FRA	GBR	GER	HUN	EUR	BEL	ITA	SIN	JPN	CHN	BRA	135	3rd
2008	F1.08	BMW P86/8 2.4 V8	B	(Germany) Nick Heidfeld	2	6^{F}	4	9	5	14	2	13	2	4^{F}	10	9	2	5	6	9	5	10	135	3rd
2008	F1.08	BMW P86/8 2.4 V8	B	(Poland) Robert Kubica	Ret	2	3^{P}	4	4	2	1	5	Ret	7	8	3	6	3	11	2	6	11	135	3rd
2009	F1.09	BMW P86/9 2.4 V8	B		AUS	MAL	CHN	BHR	ESP	MON	TUR	GBR	GER	HUN	EUR	BEL	ITA	SIN	JPN	BRA	ABU		36	6th
2009	F1.09	BMW P86/9 2.4 V8	B	(Poland) Robert Kubica	14^{†}	Ret	13	18	11	Ret	7	13	14	13	8	4	Ret	8	9	2	10		36	6th
2009	F1.09	BMW P86/9 2.4 V8	B	(Germany) Nick Heidfeld	10	2^{‡}	12	19	7	11	11	15	10	11	11	5	7	Ret	6	Ret	5		36	6th

^{‡} Half points awarded as less than 75% of race distance was completed.
