= Erwin Bauer =

German racing driver (1912–1958)

- Born: 17 July 1912; Stuttgart, German Empire
- Died: 3 June 1958 (aged 45); Cologne, West Germany

Formula One World Championship career
- Nationality: (Germany) German
- Active years: 1953
- Team: non-works Veritas
- Entries: 1
- Championships: 0
- Wins: 0
- Podiums: 0
- Career points: 0
- Pole positions: 0
- Fastest laps: 0
- First entry: 1953 German Grand Prix

Erwin Erich Bauer (17 July 1912 – 3 June 1958) was a German Formula One driver who raced a privately entered Veritas in his one World Championship Grand Prix.

== Racing career ==
In April, 1953, Bauer co-drove a Porsche 356 Super 1500 with Hans Herrmann at the Mille Miglia. They finished the race in the 30th position.

Bauer became famous for racing an undermatched Lotus to a fourth place in the 1954 1000km Nürburgring, and thus, providing Lotus with one of its earliest successes. His sole race in the Formula One World Championship came in 1953 at the German Grand Prix at the Nürburgring. In a field of thirty four, Bauer qualified 33rd, only ahead of fellow Veritas entrant Oswald Karch. He made it onto the second lap, which was more than could be said for Hans Stuck and Ernst Loof, but then his engine expired. He had jumped up to 28th, leaping ahead of the two retiring cars plus Rudolf Krause and Maurice Trintignant.

== Death ==
Five years later, again at the Nürburgring racetrack, Bauer was killed in a 2-litre sports Ferrari where, not realising he had passed the chequered flag, kept on racing and crashed fatally on what was supposed to be his slowing-down lap.

== Complete Formula One results ==
(key)

Year	Entrant	Chassis	Engine	1	2	3	4	5	6	7	8	9	WDC	Points
1953	Erwin Bauer	Veritas RS	Veritas Straight-6	ARG	500	NED	BEL	FRA	GBR	GER; Ret	SUI	ITA	NC	0
