= Formula One drivers from East Germany =

List of Formula One driver from East Germany

- Drivers: 4
- Grands Prix: 2
- Entries: 6
- Starts: 6
- Best season finish: NC (1952, 1953)
- Wins: 0
- Podiums: 0
- Pole positions: 0
- Fastest laps: 0
- Points: 0
- First entry: 1952 German Grand Prix
- Latest entry: 1953 German Grand Prix

There were 4 Formula One drivers from East Germany, with one of them (Edgar Barth) later racing as a West German. With the exception of Barth, no East German raced in Formula One outside of Germany or after 1953.

== Former drivers ==
Although East Germany was not represented in the FIA until 1957, there have been 4 World Championship drivers who are recorded as having competed under the East German flag, including:

- Ernst Klodwig is the most successful driver to race in the World Drivers' Championship while a resident of East Germany. Klodwig competed in the 1952 German Grand Prix where he finished 12th, and in the 1953 German Grand Prix where he finished 15th.
- Rudolf Krause also competed in the German Grands Prix of 1952-53. He made his debut in 1952, but retired from the race. In 1953 he finished 14th.
- Edgar Barth made his debut in the 1953 German Grand Prix, but retired from the race. Barth later competed in several other Formula One seasons, racing under a West German licence.
- Theo Fitzau also made his debut at the 1953 German Grand Prix, however he retired from the race.

== Timeline ==
Former drivers
Name	Year
Ernst Klodwig	1952–1953
Rudolf Krause	1952–1953
Edgar Barth	1953*
Theo Fitzau	1953

* Competed under West German racing license in 1957–1958, 1960–1961, 1964

== See also ==
- Formula One drivers from Germany
