= Kurt Adolff =

German racing driver (1921–2012)

- Born: 5 November 1921; Stuttgart, Weimar Republic
- Died: 24 January 2012 (aged 90); Kreuth, Germany

Formula One World Championship career
- Nationality: (Germany) German
- Active years: 1953
- Team: non-works Ferrari
- Entries: 1
- Championships: 0
- Wins: 0
- Podiums: 0
- Career points: 0
- Pole positions: 0
- Fastest laps: 0
- First entry: 1953 German Grand Prix

Kurt Adolff (5 November 1921 – 24 January 2012) was a racing driver from Germany.

Adolff was born in Stuttgart, Germany, into a family that owned a textile company, and served as a paratrooper during the Second World War. Adolff competed in Formula Two races in the early 1950s racing BMW-engined cars, achieving modest success including second place at a race at the Munich-Riem Airport. He later competed in a Ferrari 500 during 1953, and participated in the 1953 German Grand Prix, driving Rudi Fischer's Ferrari 500 for the Ecurie Espadon Team. He retired after only a few laps, and left single-seater racing to concentrate on his business interests. Adolff later enjoyed some success in hillclimbs and touring car racing with Jaguar, and also served as a consul to Chile.

== Complete Formula One World Championship results ==
(key)

| Year | Entrant | Chassis | Engine | 1 | 2 | 3 | 4 | 5 | 6 | 7 | 8 | 9 | WDC | Pts |
|---|---|---|---|---|---|---|---|---|---|---|---|---|---|---|
| 1953 | Ecurie Espadon | Ferrari 500 | Ferrari 500 2.0 L4 | ARG | 500 | NED | BEL | FRA | GBR | GER; Ret | SUI | ITA | NC | 0 |
