= Oswald Karch =

German racing driver (1917–2009)

- Born: 6 March 1917; Ludwigshafen, Germany
- Died: 28 January 2009 (aged 91); Mannheim, Germany

Formula One World Championship career
- Nationality: (Germany) German
- Active years: 1953
- Team: privateer Veritas
- Entries: 1
- Championships: 0
- Wins: 0
- Podiums: 0
- Career points: 0
- Pole positions: 0
- Fastest laps: 0
- First entry: 1953 German Grand Prix

Oswald Karch (6 March 1917 – 28 January 2009) was a racing driver from Germany. He participated in one World Championship Formula One Grand Prix, the 1953 German Grand Prix. Despite not setting a time during qualifying, he was allowed to start the race in 34th position. He retired from the race with engine failure on lap 11 while running 22nd.

During the 1950s, Karch raced in both East and West Germany in Formula Two, initially driving a BMW Eigenbau, and subsequently a Veritas RS. After his appearance in the German Grand Prix in 1953, he competed nationally during 1954, and also finished sixth in his class at the 1954 12 Hours of Casablanca.

Karch died after a period of illness in a nursing home in Mannheim in 2009.

== Complete Formula One World Championship results ==
(key)

| Year | Entrant | Chassis | Engine | 1 | 2 | 3 | 4 | 5 | 6 | 7 | 8 | 9 | WDC | Points |
|---|---|---|---|---|---|---|---|---|---|---|---|---|---|---|
| 1953 | Oswald Karch | Veritas RS | Veritas S6 | ARG | 500 | NED | BEL | FRA | GBR | GER; Ret | SUI | ITA | NC | 0 |
