= Ernst Klodwig =

German racing driver (1903–1973)

- Born: 23 May 1903; Aschersleben, Germany
- Died: 15 April 1973 (aged 69); Hamburg, West Germany

Formula One World Championship career
- Nationality: (East Germany) East German
- Active years: 1952–1953
- Team: non-works BMW
- Entries: 2
- Championships: 0
- Wins: 0
- Podiums: 0
- Career points: 0
- Pole positions: 0
- Fastest laps: 0
- First entry: 1952 German Grand Prix
- Last entry: 1953 German Grand Prix

Ernst Klodwig (23 May 1903 – 15 April 1973) was an East German racing driver. He participated in two Formula One World Championship Grands Prix, driving privately run BMWs with different engines. He was classified in both races with a best finish of 12th.

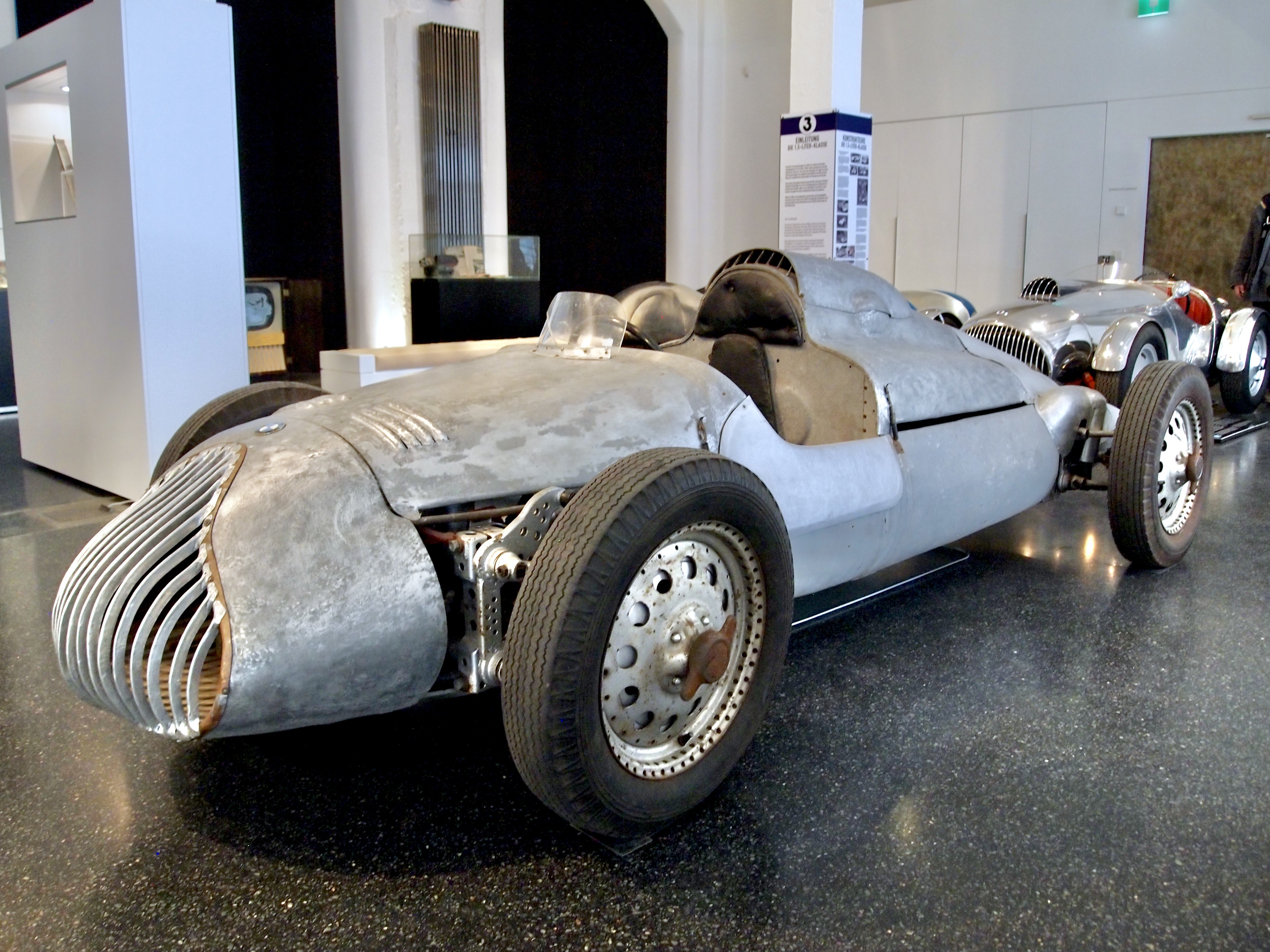
Ernst Klodwig's home-built Formula 2 car, which he used in the 1952 and 1953 German Grands Prix

== Complete Formula One World Championship results ==
(key)

Year	Entrant	Chassis	Engine	1	2	3	4	5	6	7	8	9	WDC	Points
1952	Ernst Klodwig	Heck Eigenbau	BMW 328 2.0 L6	SUI	500	BEL	FRA	GBR	GER; 12	NED	ITA		NC	0
1953	Ernst Klodwig	Heck Eigenbau	BMW 328 2.0 L6	ARG	500	NED	BEL	FRA	GBR	GER; 15	SUI	ITA	NC	0
