= Theo Fitzau =

German racing driver (1923–1982)

- Born: 10 February 1923; Köthen, Germany
- Died: 18 March 1982 (aged 59); Groß-Gerau, West Germany

Formula One World Championship career
- Nationality: (East Germany) East German
- Active years: 1953
- Team: non-works AFM
- Entries: 1
- Championships: 0
- Wins: 0
- Podiums: 0
- Career points: 0
- Pole positions: 0
- Fastest laps: 0
- First entry: 1953 German Grand Prix

Theodor Fitzau (10 February 1923 – 18 March 1982) was a racing driver from East Germany. Generally a Formula Two racer, he participated in one World Championship Grand Prix, the 1953 German Grand Prix, driving an AFM owned by fellow driver Helmut Niedermayr. He retired from the race, scoring no championship points.

== Complete World Championship results ==
(key)

Year	Entrant	Chassis	Engine	1	2	3	4	5	6	7	8	9	WDC	Points
1953	Helmut Niedermayr	AFM U8	BMW Straight-6	ARG	500	NED	BEL	FRA	GBR	GER; Ret	SUI	ITA	NC	0
