= 1953 German Grand Prix =

← Previous race	Next race →
- Nürburgring layout

Race details
- Date: 2 August 1953
- Official name: XVI Großer Preis von Deutschland
- Location: Nürburgring, Nürburg, West Germany
- Course: Permanent road course
- Course length: 22.810 km (14.173 miles)
- Distance: 18 laps, 410.580 km (255.123 miles)
- Weather: Sunny, mild, dry

Pole position
Driver	(Italy) Alberto Ascari	Ferrari
- Time: 9:59.8

Fastest lap
Driver	(Italy) Alberto Ascari	Ferrari
- Time: 9:56.0 on lap 12

Podium
First	(Italy) Nino Farina	Ferrari
Second	(Argentina) Juan Manuel Fangio	Maserati
Third	(United Kingdom) Mike Hawthorn	Ferrari

The 1953 German Grand Prix was a Formula Two motor racing event held on 2 August 1953 at the Nürburgring Nordschleife. It was race 7 of 9 in the 1953 World Championship of Drivers, which was run to Formula Two rules in 1952 and 1953, rather than the Formula One regulations normally used. This race had the highest number of cars on the grid of any World Drivers' Championship race, with 34 starters.

This race was won by Nino Farina in a Ferrari, just over 1 minute ahead of Juan Manuel Fangio. This was Farina's last victory in Formula One.

Ferrari driver Alberto Ascari clinched his second consecutive World Drivers' Championship as neither Mike Hawthorn nor Juan Manuel Fangio won the race and now could not beat his points total with two races left. Ascari became the first back-to-back World Drivers' Champion.

Four East German drivers partook in this race; these four drivers were the only ever drivers to race under an East German licence. This race was the last time any driver competed under an East German licence: Theo Fitzau, Ernst Klodwig and Rudolf Krause would never race in Formula One again, while Edgar Barth would race again under a West German licence.

During his tour of Europe that saw Japan's 19-year old Crown Prince Akihito visit the Coronation of Queen Elizabeth II, he also attended the German Grand Prix.

== Entries ==
Team	No	Driver	Car	Engine	Tyre
(Italy) Scuderia Ferrari	1	(Italy) Alberto Ascari	Ferrari Tipo 500	Ferrari 500 2.0 L4	P
(Italy) Scuderia Ferrari	2	(Italy) Nino Farina	Ferrari Tipo 500	Ferrari 500 2.0 L4	P
(Italy) Scuderia Ferrari	3	(United Kingdom) Mike Hawthorn	Ferrari Tipo 500	Ferrari 500 2.0 L4	P
(Italy) Scuderia Ferrari	4	(Italy) Luigi Villoresi	Ferrari Tipo 500	Ferrari 500 2.0 L4	P
(Italy) Officine Alfieri Maserati	5	(Argentina) Juan Manuel Fangio	Maserati A6GCM	Maserati A6 2.0 L6	P
(Italy) Officine Alfieri Maserati	7	(Italy) Felice Bonetto	Maserati A6GCM	Maserati A6 2.0 L6	P
(Italy) Officine Alfieri Maserati	8	(Argentina) Onofre Marimón	Maserati A6GCM	Maserati A6 2.0 L6	P
(France) Equipe Gordini	9	(France) Jean Behra	Gordini Type 16	Gordini 20 2.0 L6	E
(France) Equipe Gordini	10	(France) Maurice Trintignant	Gordini Type 16	Gordini 20 2.0 L6	E
(France) Equipe Gordini	11	(United States) Harry Schell	Gordini Type 16	Gordini 20 2.0 L6	E
(Belgium) Ecurie Belge	12	(Belgium) Johnny Claes	Connaught Type A	Lea-Francis 2.0 L4	E
(United Kingdom) Connaught Engineering	14	(Thailand) Prince Bira	Connaught Type A	Lea-Francis 2.0 L4	D
(United Kingdom) Connaught Engineering	15	(United Kingdom) Roy Salvadori	Connaught Type A	Lea-Francis 2.0 L4	D
(United Kingdom) Connaught Engineering	16	(United Kingdom) Kenneth McAlpine	Connaught Type A	Lea-Francis 2.0 L4	D
(Switzerland) Emmanuel de Graffenried	17	(Switzerland) Toulo de Graffenried	Maserati A6GCM	Maserati A6 2.0 L6	P
(Belgium) Ecurie Francorchamps	18	(Belgium) Jacques Swaters	Ferrari Tipo 500	Ferrari 500 2.0 L4	E
(United Kingdom) Cooper Car Company	19	(United Kingdom) Stirling Moss	Cooper T24	Alta GP 2.5 L4	D
(France) Ecurie Rosier	20	(France) Louis Rosier	Ferrari Tipo 500	Ferrari 500 2.0 L4	D
(West Germany) Hans Stuck	21	(West Germany) Hans Stuck	AFM 6	Bristol BS1 2.0 L6	D
(West Germany) Wolfgang Seidel	22	(West Germany) Wolfgang Seidel	Veritas RS	Veritas 2.0 L6	D
(West Germany) Willi Heeks	23	(West Germany) Willi Heeks	Veritas Meteor	Veritas 2.0 L6	D
(West Germany) Theo Helfrich	24	(West Germany) Theo Helfrich	Veritas RS	Veritas 2.0 L6	D
(West Germany) Oswald Karch	26	(West Germany) Oswald Karch	Veritas RS	Veritas 2.0 L6	D
(West Germany) Helmut Niedermayr	28	(West Germany) Theo Fitzau	AFM U8	BMW 328 2.0 L6	D
(West Germany) Ernst Loof	30	(West Germany) Ernst Loof	Veritas Meteor	Veritas 2.0 L6	D
(West Germany) Hans Herrmann	31	(West Germany) Hans Herrmann	Veritas Meteor	Veritas 2.0 L6	D
(West Germany) Erwin Bauer	32	(West Germany) Erwin Bauer	Veritas RS	Veritas 2.0 L6	D
(Switzerland) Ecurie Espadon	34	(West Germany) Kurt Adolff	Ferrari Tipo 500	Ferrari 500 2.0 L4	P
(East Germany) Rennkollektiv EMW	35	(East Germany) Edgar Barth	EMW R2	EMW 6 2.0 L6	D
(East Germany) Dora Greifzu	36	(East Germany) Rudolf Krause	Eigenbau	BMW 328 2.0 L6	D
(East Germany) Ernst Klodwig	37	(East Germany) Ernst Klodwig	Eigenbau	BMW 328 2.0 L6	D
(United Kingdom) Equipe Anglaise	38	(United Kingdom) Alan Brown	Cooper T23	Bristol BS1 2.0 L6	D
(United Kingdom) Equipe Anglaise	39	(West Germany) Helm Glöckler	Cooper T23	Bristol BS1 2.0 L6	D
(United Kingdom) Rodney Nuckey	40	(United Kingdom) Rodney Nuckey	Cooper T23	Bristol BS1 2.0 L6	D
(West Germany) Günther Bechem	41	(West Germany) Günther Bechem	AFM 50-5	BMW 328 2.0 L6	D

== Classification ==
=== Qualifying ===
Pos	No	Driver	Constructor	Time	Gap
1	1	(Italy) Alberto Ascari	Ferrari	9:59.8	—
2	5	(Argentina) Juan Manuel Fangio	Maserati	10:03.7	+ 3.9
3	2	(Italy) Nino Farina	Ferrari	10:04.1	+ 4.3
4	3	(United Kingdom) Mike Hawthorn	Ferrari	10:12.6	+ 12.8
5	10	(France) Maurice Trintignant	Gordini	10:21.7	+ 21.9
6	4	(Italy) Luigi Villoresi	Ferrari	10:22.8	+ 23.0
7	7	(Italy) Felice Bonetto	Maserati	10:40.8	+ 41.0
8	8	(Argentina) Onofre Marimón	Maserati	10:41.0	+ 41.2
9	9	(France) Jean Behra	Gordini	10:45.5	+ 45.7
10	11	(United States) Harry Schell	Gordini	10:46.2	+ 46.4
11	17	(Switzerland) Toulo de Graffenried	Maserati	10:46.6	+ 46.8
12	19	(United Kingdom) Stirling Moss	Cooper-Alta	10:48.3	+ 48.5
13	15	(United Kingdom) Roy Salvadori	Connaught-Lea-Francis	10:57.5	+ 57.7
14	31	(West Germany) Hans Herrmann	Veritas	10:59.8	+ 1:00.0
15	14	(Thailand) Prince Bira	Connaught-Lea-Francis	11:02.1	+ 1:02.3
16	16	(United Kingdom) Kenneth McAlpine	Connaught-Lea-Francis	11:07.3	+ 1:07.5
17	38	(United Kingdom) Alan Brown	Cooper-Bristol	11:08.7	+ 1:08.9
18	23	(West Germany) Willi Heeks	Veritas	11:18.0	+ 1:18.2
19	18	(Belgium) Jacques Swaters	Ferrari	11:18.9	+ 1:19.1
20	40	(United Kingdom) Rodney Nuckey	Cooper-Bristol	11:22.1	+ 1:22.3
21	28	(West Germany) Theo Fitzau	AFM-BMW	11:23.4	+ 1:23.6
22	20	(France) Louis Rosier	Ferrari	11:27.4	+ 1:27.6
23	21	(West Germany) Hans Stuck	AFM-Bristol	11:37.2	+ 1:37.4
24	35	(East Germany) Edgar Barth	EMW	11:40.8	+ 1:41.0
25	12	(Belgium) Johnny Claes	Connaught-Lea-Francis	11:45.5	+ 1:45.7
26	36	(East Germany) Rudolf Krause	Greifzu-BMW	11:49.5	+ 1:49.7
27	34	(West Germany) Kurt Adolff	Ferrari	11:53.1	+ 1:53.3
28	24	(West Germany) Theo Helfrich	Veritas	11:56.3	+ 1:56.5
29	22	(West Germany) Wolfgang Seidel	Veritas	11:59.3	+ 1:59.5
30	41	(West Germany) Günther Bechem	AFM-BMW	12:13.3	+ 2:13.5
31	30	(West Germany) Ernst Loof	Veritas	12:16.8	+ 2:17.0
32	37	(East Germany) Ernst Klodwig	Heck-BMW	12:24.6	+ 2:24.8
33	32	(West Germany) Erwin Bauer	Veritas	No time	—
34	26	(West Germany) Oswald Karch	Veritas	No time	—
35	39	(West Germany) Helm Glöckler	Cooper-Bristol	No time	—

=== Race ===
Pos	No	Driver	Constructor	Laps	Time/Retired	Grid	Points
1	2	(Italy) Nino Farina	Ferrari	18	3:02:25.0	3	8
2	5	(Argentina) Juan Manuel Fangio	Maserati	18	+ 1:04.0	2	6
3	3	(United Kingdom) Mike Hawthorn	Ferrari	18	+ 1:43.6	4	4
4	7	(Italy) Felice Bonetto	Maserati	18	+ 8:48.6	7	3
5	17	(Switzerland) Toulo de Graffenried	Maserati	17	+ 1 Lap	11	2
6	19	(United Kingdom) Stirling Moss	Cooper-Alta	17	+ 1 Lap	12	
7	18	(Belgium) Jacques Swaters	Ferrari	17	+ 1 Lap	19	
8	1	(Italy) Alberto Ascari (Italy) Luigi Villoresi	Ferrari	17	+ 1 Lap	1	
9	31	(West Germany) Hans Herrmann	Veritas	17	+ 1 Lap	14	
10	20	(France) Louis Rosier	Ferrari	17	+ 1 Lap	22	
11	40	(United Kingdom) Rodney Nuckey	Cooper-Bristol	16	+ 2 Laps	20	
12	24	(West Germany) Theo Helfrich	Veritas	16	+ 2 Laps	28	
13	16	(United Kingdom) Kenneth McAlpine	Connaught-Lea-Francis	16	+ 2 Laps	16	
14	36	(East Germany) Rudolf Krause	Greifzu-BMW	16	+ 2 Laps	26	
15	37	(East Germany) Ernst Klodwig	Heck-BMW	15	+ 3 Laps	32	
16	22	(West Germany) Wolfgang Seidel	Veritas	14	+ 4 Laps	29	
Ret	4	(Italy) Luigi Villoresi (Italy) Alberto Ascari	Ferrari	15	Engine	6	1^{1}
Ret	38	(United Kingdom) Alan Brown	Cooper-Bristol	15	Engine	17	
Ret	8	(Argentina) Onofre Marimón	Maserati	13	Suspension	8	
Ret	35	(East Germany) Edgar Barth	EMW	12	Exhaust	24	
Ret	12	(Belgium) Johnny Claes	Connaught-Lea-Francis	12	Engine	25	
Ret	26	(West Germany) Oswald Karch	Veritas	10	Engine	34	
Ret	23	(West Germany) Willi Heeks	Veritas	8	Transmission	18	
Ret	9	(France) Jean Behra	Gordini	7	Gearbox	9	
Ret	11	(United States) Harry Schell	Gordini	6	Engine	10	
Ret	14	(Thailand) Prince Bira	Connaught-Lea-Francis	6	Suspension	15	
Ret	28	(West Germany) Theo Fitzau	AFM-BMW	3	Engine	21	
Ret	34	(West Germany) Kurt Adolff	Ferrari	3	Transmission	27	
Ret	41	(West Germany) Günther Bechem	AFM-BMW	2	Engine	30	
Ret	10	(France) Maurice Trintignant	Gordini	1	Differential	5	
Ret	15	(United Kingdom) Roy Salvadori	Connaught-Lea-Francis	1	Engine	13	
Ret	32	(West Germany) Erwin Bauer	Veritas	1	Engine	33	
Ret	21	(West Germany) Hans Stuck	AFM-Bristol	0	Engine	23	
Ret	30	(West Germany) Ernst Loof	Veritas	0	Fuel Pump	31	
DNS	39	(West Germany) Helm Glöckler	Cooper-Bristol	0	Engine		

Notes

- ^1 – 1 point for fastest lap

== Shared drives ==
- : (Ascari and Villoresi switched cars)
  - Car #1: Ascari (9 laps) then Villoresi (8 laps)
  - Car #4: Villoresi (10 laps) then Ascari (5 laps)

== Championship standings after the race ==
Drivers' Championship standings

	Pos	Driver	Points
	1	(Italy) Alberto Ascari	33.5 (37.5)
4	2	(Italy) Nino Farina	20
2	3	(Argentina) Juan Manuel Fangio	19
2	4	(United Kingdom) Mike Hawthorn	18 (20)
2	5	(Argentina) José Froilán González	13.5 (14.5)

- Note: Only the top five positions are included. Only the best 4 results counted towards the Championship. Numbers without parentheses are Championship points; numbers in parentheses are total points scored.

Previous race: 1953 British Grand Prix	FIA Formula One World Championship; 1953 season	Next race: 1953 Swiss Grand Prix
Previous race: 1952 German Grand Prix	German Grand Prix	Next race: 1954 German Grand Prix
