= Veritas RS =

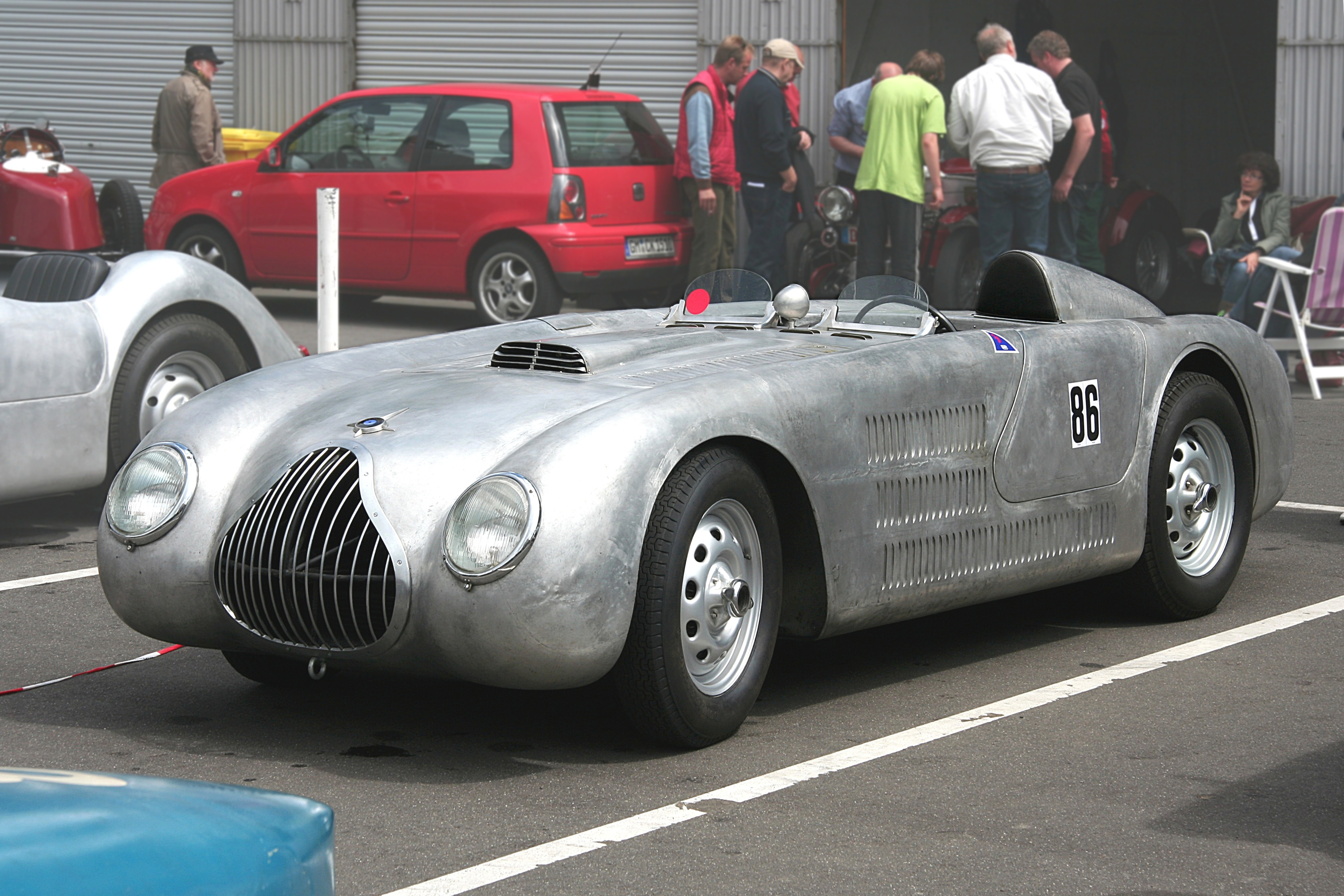
1948 Veritas RS BMW

The Veritas RS was a Veritas sports car based on the BMW 328, which also competed in Formula One. It participated in five World Championship Grands Prix: the 1952 Swiss Grand Prix, the 1952 Belgian Grand Prix, the 1952 German Grand Prix, the 1953 Belgian Grand Prix, and the 1953 German Grand Prix. Its best result in Formula One racing was a 7th-place finish at the 1952 German Grand Prix, driven by Fritz Riess.

== History ==
In 1949, work was completed on the racing sports car based on the BMW 328, with the engine output increased to 125 hp (93 kW) (with some models reaching up to 135 hp (101 kW)). However, 1949 also saw the launch of the Veritas Komet coupé, a road version of the RS. Additionally, in the same year, Veritas relocated to Muggensturm, where it abandoned the 2-litre BMW engine of the 328 in favour of a 2 L (120 cu in) engine (specifically, 1998 cm³) manufactured by Heinkel. Despite receiving 200 orders for motorised Veritas models, poor financial management led to the end of series production in 1950.

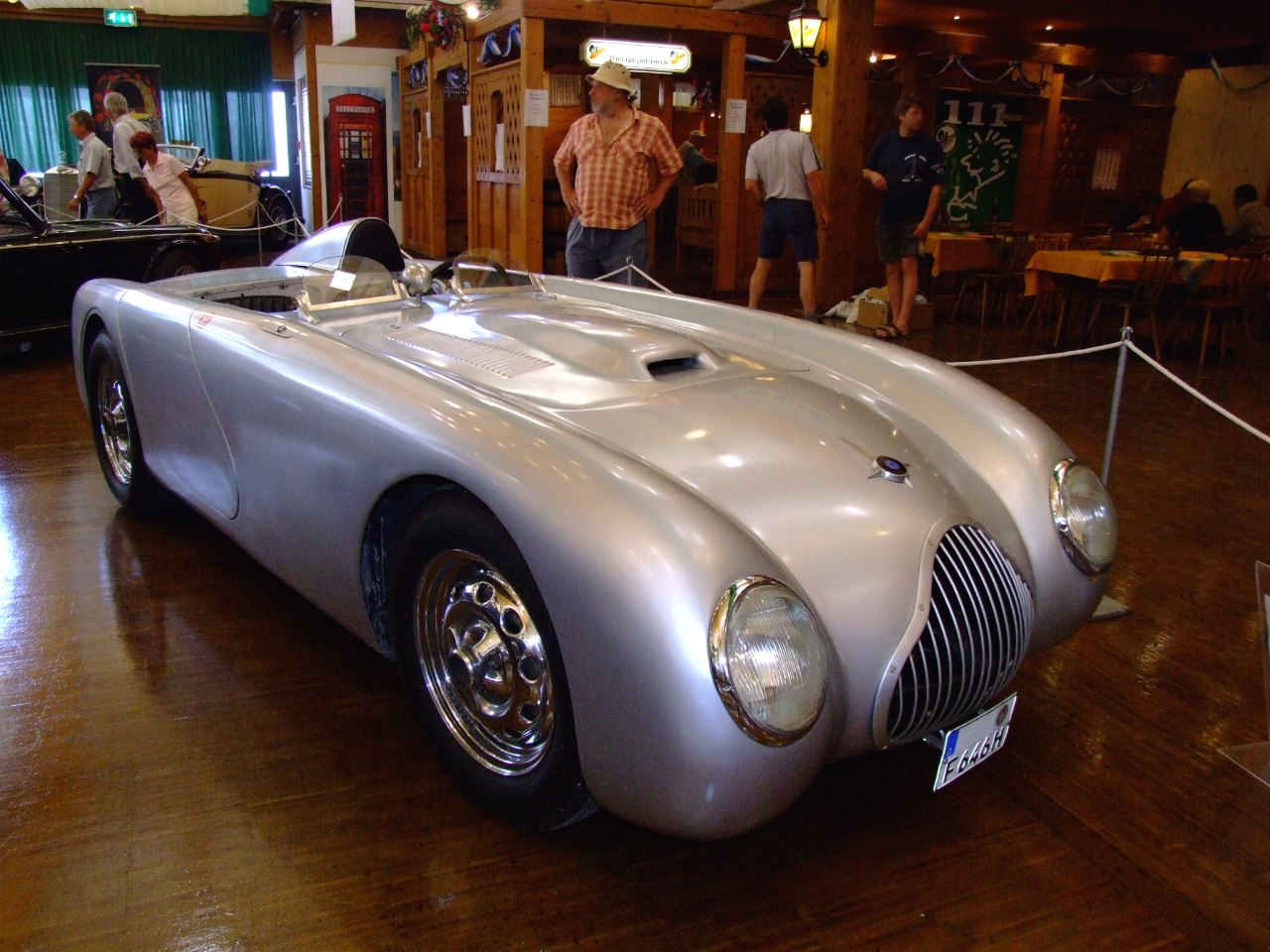
1948 Veritas RS car

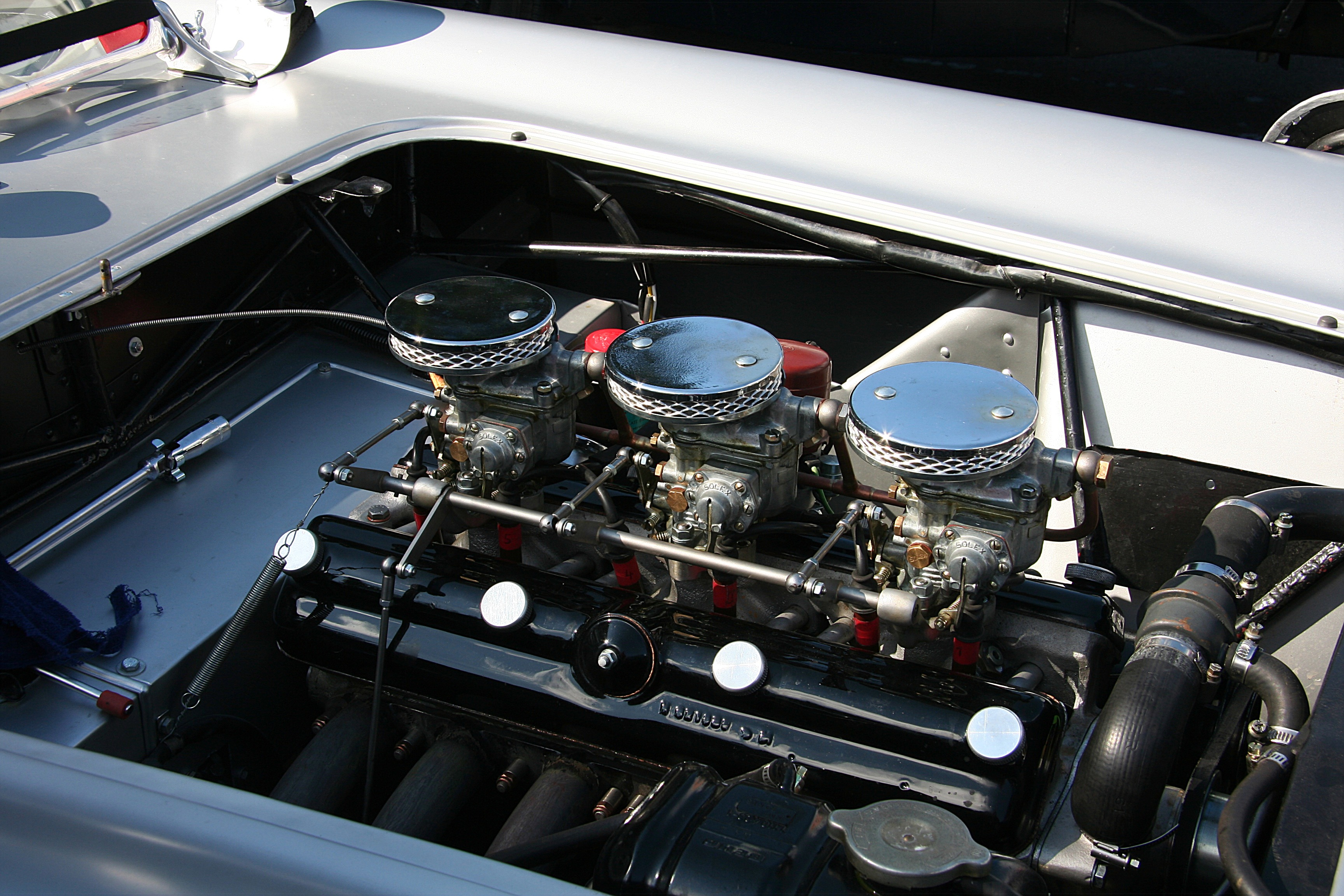
The engine of the BMW 328

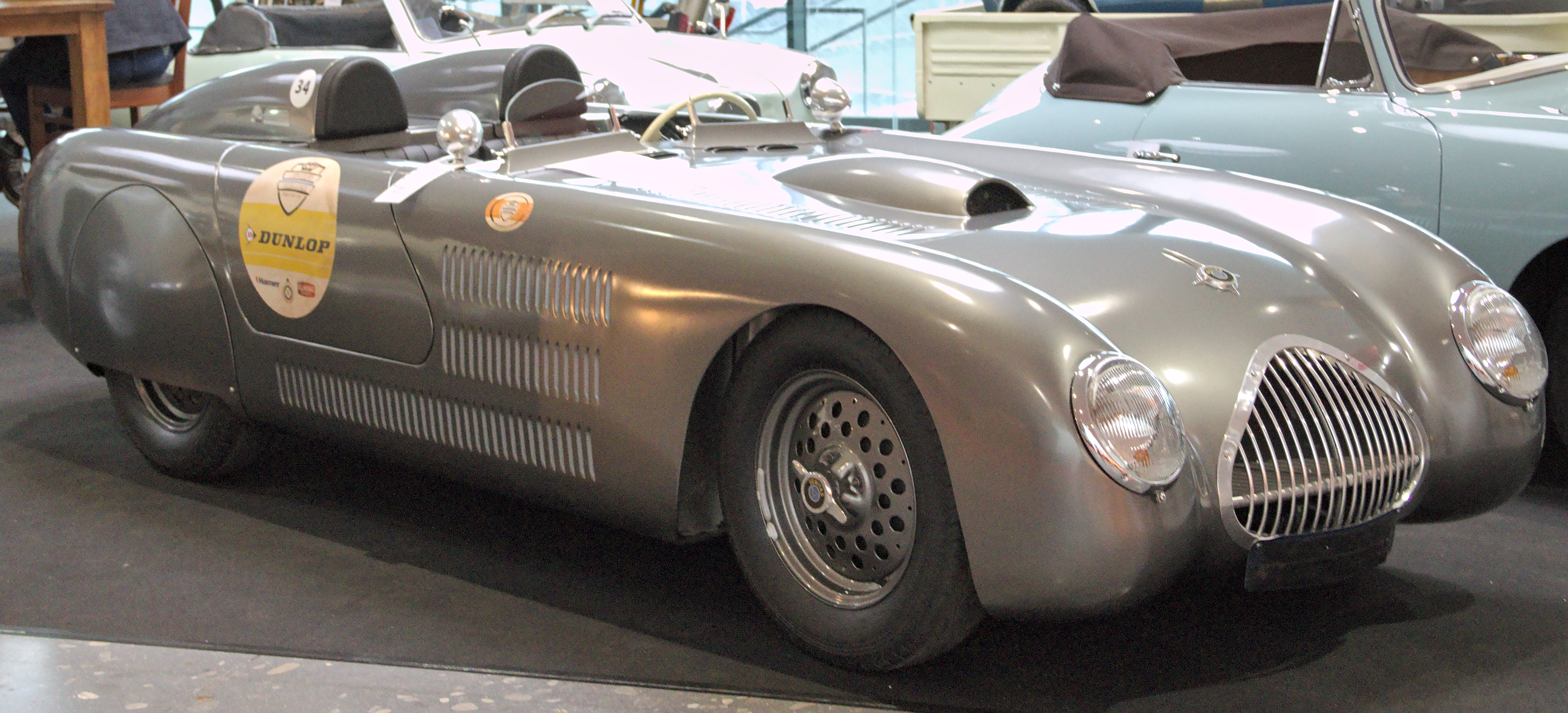
1949 Veritas car
