= Rudolf Krause =

German racing driver (1907–1987)

- Born: 30 March 1907; Oberreichenbach, Reichenbach im Vogtland, German Empire
- Died: 11 April 1987 (aged 80); Reichenbach im Vogtland, East Germany

Formula One World Championship career
- Nationality: (East Germany) East German
- Active years: 1952–1953
- Team: non-works BMW
- Entries: 2
- Championships: 0
- Wins: 0
- Podiums: 0
- Career points: 0
- Pole positions: 0
- Fastest laps: 0
- First entry: 1952 German Grand Prix
- Last entry: 1953 German Grand Prix

Rudolf Krause (30 March 1907 – 11 April 1987) was a racing driver from East Germany.

== Biography ==
Born in Reichenbach im Vogtland, Krause is mainly known as one of the leading sportsmen in motor racing in Formula Two, during his career between 1927 and 1954, beside other Formula Two drivers like Hans Stuck. In 1952 and 1953 he participated in two World Championship Grands Prix. He scored no championship points and his only finish was 14th in the 1953 German Grand Prix. When Krause’s career began in 1927, he mainly raced in motorcycles. He switched to self-modified cars in the beginning of the 1930s.

Soon after Krause’s career began, he set up his own mechanic shop inside of his garage in Reichenbach, and raced in his own BMW sports car. Krause’s formula racing career debuted in 1949 when racing in East Germany itself began races after the Second World War. Krause was a top contender when East Germany ran its own formula racing Grand Prix and championships between 1950 and 1953, placing in top positions several times and winning the formula 2 East German Championship in its last year of existence. He mainly drove in BMW race cars, many of which were at least partially built in his own workshop in Reichenbach.

When Krause retired in 1954, it was mainly because of his age. However, it also awards him the distinction of one of the few East German drivers to not defect to western Germany to further his career.

== Complete World Championship Grand Prix results ==
(key)

Year	Entrant	Chassis	Engine	1	2	3	4	5	6	7	8	9	WDC	Points
1952	Rudolf Krause	Reif	BMW	SUI	500	BEL	FRA	GBR	GER; Ret	NED	ITA		NC	0
1953	Dora Greifzu	Greifzu	BMW	ARG	500	NED	BEL	FRA	GBR	GER; 14	SUI	ITA	NC	0
