= 1953 British Grand Prix =

← Previous race	Next race →
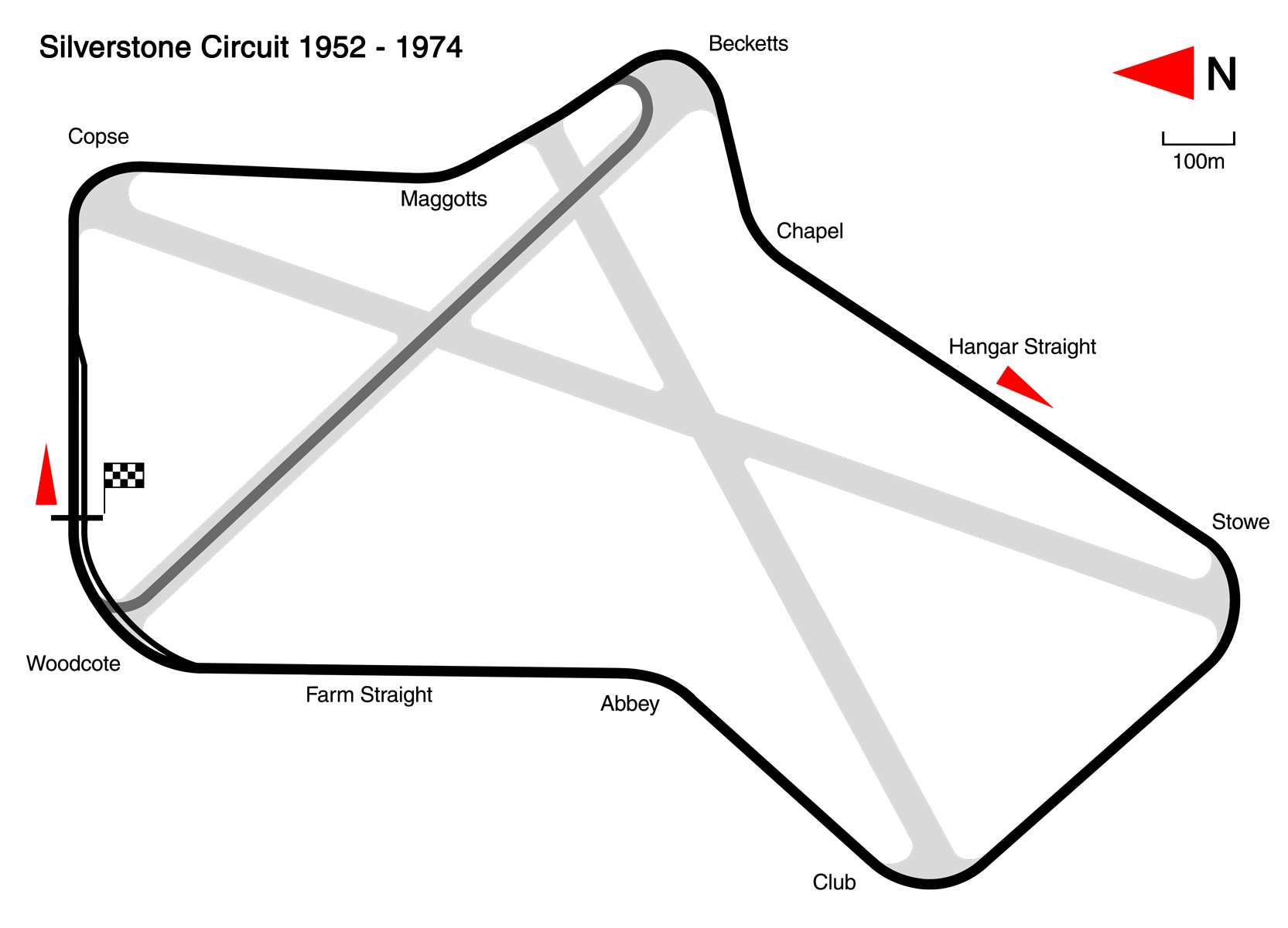
- Silverstone Circuit in 1952–1973 configuration

Race details
- Date: 18 July 1953
- Official name: 6th RAC British Grand Prix
- Location: Silverstone Circuit; Silverstone, England
- Course: Permanent racing facility
- Course length: 4.7105 km (2.927 miles)
- Distance: 90 laps, 423.949 km (263.43 miles)
- Weather: Overcast, showers
- Attendance: 100,000

Pole position
Driver	(Italy) Alberto Ascari	Ferrari
- Time: 1:48.0

Fastest lap
Drivers	(Italy) Alberto Ascari	Ferrari
	(Argentina) José Froilán González	Maserati
- Time: 1:50.0

Podium
First	(Italy) Alberto Ascari	Ferrari
Second	(Argentina) Juan Manuel Fangio	Maserati
Third	(Italy) Nino Farina	Ferrari

The 1953 British Grand Prix was a Formula Two motor race held on 18 July 1953 at Silverstone Circuit. It was race 6 of 9 in the 1953 World Championship of Drivers, which was run to Formula Two rules in 1952 and 1953, rather than the Formula One regulations normally used. The 90-lap race was won by Ferrari driver Alberto Ascari after he started from pole position. Juan Manuel Fangio finished second for the Maserati team and Ascari's teammate Nino Farina came in third.

== Background ==
The Ferrari and Maserati lineup was unchanged from the French Grand Prix. Initially three Cooper Mk IIs were entered for Peter Whitehead, Tony Crook and Stirling Moss. However, due to Moss's retirement at the French Grand Prix his car had to be withdrawn.

== Entries ==
Team	No	Driver	Car	Engine	Tyre
(United Kingdom) HW Motors	1	(United Kingdom) Lance Macklin	HWM 53	Alta GP 2.0 L4	D
(United Kingdom) HW Motors	2	(United Kingdom) Peter Collins	HWM 53	Alta GP 2.0 L4	D
(United Kingdom) HW Motors	3	(United Kingdom) Duncan Hamilton	HWM 53	Alta GP 2.0 L4	D
(United Kingdom) HW Motors	4	(United Kingdom) Jack Fairman	HWM 53	Alta GP 2.0 L4	D
(Italy) Scuderia Ferrari	5	(Italy) Alberto Ascari	Ferrari Tipo 500	Ferrari 500 2.0 L4	P
(Italy) Scuderia Ferrari	6	(Italy) Nino Farina	Ferrari Tipo 500	Ferrari 500 2.0 L4	P
(Italy) Scuderia Ferrari	7	(Italy) Luigi Villoresi	Ferrari Tipo 500	Ferrari 500 2.0 L4	P
(Italy) Scuderia Ferrari	8	(United Kingdom) Mike Hawthorn	Ferrari Tipo 500	Ferrari 500 2.0 L4	P
(France) Ecurie Rosier	9	(France) Louis Rosier	Ferrari Tipo 500	Ferrari 500 2.0 L4	D
(United Kingdom) Connaught Engineering	10	(Thailand) Prince Bira	Connaught Type A	Lea-Francis 2.0 L4	D
(United Kingdom) Connaught Engineering	11	(United Kingdom) Kenneth McAlpine	Connaught Type A	Lea-Francis 2.0 L4	D
(United Kingdom) Connaught Engineering	12	(United Kingdom) Roy Salvadori	Connaught Type A	Lea-Francis 2.0 L4	D
(United Kingdom) R.R.C. Walker Racing Team	14	(United Kingdom) Tony Rolt	Connaught Type A	Lea-Francis 2.0 L4	D
(United Kingdom) Ecurie Ecosse	15	(United Kingdom) Ian Stewart	Connaught Type A	Lea-Francis 2.0 L4	D
(United Kingdom) Ecurie Ecosse	18	(United Kingdom) Jimmy Stewart	Cooper T20	Bristol BS1 2.0 L6	D
(United Kingdom) Ken Wharton	16	(United Kingdom) Ken Wharton	Cooper T23	Bristol BS1 2.0 L6	D
(United Kingdom) Bob Gerard	17	(United Kingdom) Bob Gerard	Cooper T23	Bristol BS1 2.0 L6	D
(United Kingdom) R.J. Chase	19	(United Kingdom) Alan Brown	Cooper T23	Bristol BS1 2.0 L6	D
(United Kingdom) Atlantic Stable	20	(United Kingdom) Peter Whitehead	Cooper T24	Alta GP 2.0 L4	D
(United Kingdom) Tony Crook	22	(United Kingdom) Tony Crook	Cooper T20	Bristol BS1 2.0 L6	D
(Italy) Officine Alfieri Maserati	23	(Argentina) Juan Manuel Fangio	Maserati A6GCM	Maserati A6 2.0 L6	P
(Italy) Officine Alfieri Maserati	24	(Argentina) José Froilán González	Maserati A6GCM	Maserati A6 2.0 L6	P
(Italy) Officine Alfieri Maserati	25	(Italy) Felice Bonetto	Maserati A6GCM	Maserati A6 2.0 L6	P
(Italy) Officine Alfieri Maserati	26	(Argentina) Onofre Marimón	Maserati A6GCM	Maserati A6 2.0 L6	P
(Monaco) Louis Chiron	27	(Monaco) Louis Chiron	OSCA 20	OSCA 2000 2.0 L6	P
(France) Equipe Gordini	28	(United States) Harry Schell	Gordini Type 16	Gordini 20 2.0 L6	E
(France) Equipe Gordini	29	(France) Maurice Trintignant	Gordini Type 16	Gordini 20 2.0 L6	E
(France) Equipe Gordini	30	(France) Jean Behra	Gordini Type 16	Gordini 20 2.0 L6	E
(Switzerland) Emmanuel de Graffenried	31	(Switzerland) Toulo de Graffenried	Maserati A6GCM	Maserati A6 2.0 L6	P

== Classification ==
=== Qualifying ===
Pos	No	Driver	Constructor	Time	Gap
1	5	(Italy) Alberto Ascari	Ferrari	1:48.0	—
2	24	(Argentina) José Froilán González	Maserati	1:49.0	+ 1.0
3	8	(United Kingdom) Mike Hawthorn	Ferrari	1:49.2	+ 1.2
4	23	(Argentina) Juan Manuel Fangio	Maserati	1:50.0	+ 2.0
5	6	(Italy) Nino Farina	Ferrari	1:50.5	+ 2.5
6	7	(Italy) Luigi Villoresi	Ferrari	1:51.0	+ 3.0
7	26	(Argentina) Onofre Marimón	Maserati	1:51.3	+ 3.3
8	29	(France) Maurice Trintignant	Gordini	1:52.0	+ 4.0
9	28	(United States) Harry Schell	Gordini	1:52.0	+ 4.0
10	14	(United Kingdom) Tony Rolt	Connaught-Lea-Francis	1:54.0	+ 6.0
11	16	(United Kingdom) Ken Wharton	Cooper-Bristol	1:54.0	+ 6.0
12	1	(United Kingdom) Lance Macklin	HWM-Alta	1:57.0	+ 9.0
13	11	(United Kingdom) Kenneth McAlpine	Connaught-Lea-Francis	1:57.6	+ 9.6
14	20	(United Kingdom) Peter Whitehead	Cooper-Alta	1:57.8	+ 9.8
15	18	(United Kingdom) Jimmy Stewart	Cooper-Bristol	1:58.0	+ 10.0
16	25	(Italy) Felice Bonetto	Maserati	1:58.2	+ 10.2
17	3	(United Kingdom) Duncan Hamilton	HWM-Alta	2:02.0	+ 14.0
18	17	(United Kingdom) Bob Gerard	Cooper-Bristol	2:02.0	+ 14.0
19	10	(Thailand) Prince Bira	Connaught-Lea-Francis	2:04.0	+ 16.0
20	15	(United Kingdom) Ian Stewart	Connaught-Lea-Francis	2:04.0	+ 16.0
21	19	(United Kingdom) Alan Brown	Cooper-Bristol	2:04.0	+ 16.0
22	30	(France) Jean Behra	Gordini	2:04.0	+ 16.0
23	2	(United Kingdom) Peter Collins	HWM-Alta	2:05.0	+ 17.0
24	9	(France) Louis Rosier	Ferrari	2:07.0	+ 19.0
25	22	(United Kingdom) Tony Crook	Cooper-Bristol	2:07.4	+ 19.4
26	31	(Switzerland) Toulo de Graffenried	Maserati	2:08.0	+ 20.0
27	4	(United Kingdom) Jack Fairman	HWM-Alta	2:08.4	+ 20.4
28	12	(United Kingdom) Roy Salvadori	Connaught-Lea-Francis	2:09.0	+ 21.0
29	27	(Monaco) Louis Chiron	OSCA	No time	—

=== Race ===
Pos	No	Driver	Constructor	Laps	Time/Retired	Grid	Points
1	5	(Italy) Alberto Ascari	Ferrari	90	2:50:00	1	8.5^{1}
2	23	(Argentina) Juan Manuel Fangio	Maserati	90	+ 1:00	4	6
3	6	(Italy) Nino Farina	Ferrari	88	+ 2 Laps	5	4
4	24	(Argentina) José Froilán González	Maserati	88	+ 2 Laps	2	3.5^{1}
5	8	(United Kingdom) Mike Hawthorn	Ferrari	87	+ 3 Laps	3	2
6	25	(Italy) Felice Bonetto	Maserati	82	+ 8 Laps	16	
7	10	(Thailand) Prince Bira	Connaught-Lea-Francis	82	+ 8 Laps	19	
8	16	(United Kingdom) Ken Wharton	Cooper-Bristol	80	+ 10 Laps	11	
9	20	(United Kingdom) Peter Whitehead	Cooper-Alta	79	+ 11 Laps	14	
10	9	(France) Louis Rosier	Ferrari	78	+ 12 Laps	24	
Ret	18	(United Kingdom) Jimmy Stewart	Cooper-Bristol	79	Spun off	15	
Ret	14	(United Kingdom) Tony Rolt	Connaught-Lea-Francis	70	Halfshaft	10	
Ret	7	(Italy) Luigi Villoresi	Ferrari	65	Axle	6	
Ret	26	(Argentina) Onofre Marimón	Maserati	65	Engine	7	
Ret	19	(United Kingdom) Alan Brown	Cooper-Bristol	56	Overheating	21	
Ret	2	(United Kingdom) Peter Collins	HWM-Alta	56	Spun off	23	
Ret	4	(United Kingdom) Jack Fairman	HWM-Alta	54	Clutch	27	
Ret	12	(United Kingdom) Roy Salvadori	Connaught-Lea-Francis	50	Wheel	28	
Ret	31	(Switzerland) Toulo de Graffenried	Maserati	34	Clutch	26	
Ret	1	(United Kingdom) Lance Macklin	HWM-Alta	31	Clutch	12	
Ret	30	(France) Jean Behra	Gordini	30	Fuel Pump	22	
Ret	15	(United Kingdom) Ian Stewart	Connaught-Lea-Francis	24	Ignition	20	
Ret	29	(France) Maurice Trintignant	Gordini	14	Axle	8	
Ret	3	(United Kingdom) Duncan Hamilton	HWM-Alta	14	Clutch	17	
Ret	17	(United Kingdom) Bob Gerard	Cooper-Bristol	8	Suspension	18	
Ret	28	(United States) Harry Schell	Gordini	5	Electrical	9	
Ret	11	(United Kingdom) Kenneth McAlpine	Connaught-Lea-Francis	0	Retirement	13	
Ret	22	(United Kingdom) Tony Crook	Cooper-Bristol	0	Fuel System	25	
DNS	27	(Monaco) Louis Chiron	OSCA	0	Did not start		

Notes

- ^1 – Includes 0.5 points for shared fastest lap

== Championship standings after the race ==
Drivers' Championship standings

	Pos	Driver	Points
	1	(Italy) Alberto Ascari	33.5 (36.5)
	2	(United Kingdom) Mike Hawthorn	16
1	3	(Argentina) José Froilán González	13.5 (14.5)
1	4	(Italy) Luigi Villoresi	13
2	5	(Argentina) Juan Manuel Fangio	13

- Note: Only the top five positions are included. Only the best 4 results counted towards the Championship. Numbers without parentheses are Championship points; numbers in parentheses are total points scored.

Previous race: 1953 French Grand Prix	FIA Formula One World Championship; 1953 season	Next race: 1953 German Grand Prix
Previous race: 1952 British Grand Prix	British Grand Prix	Next race: 1954 British Grand Prix
