= 1953 French Grand Prix =

← Previous race	Next race →
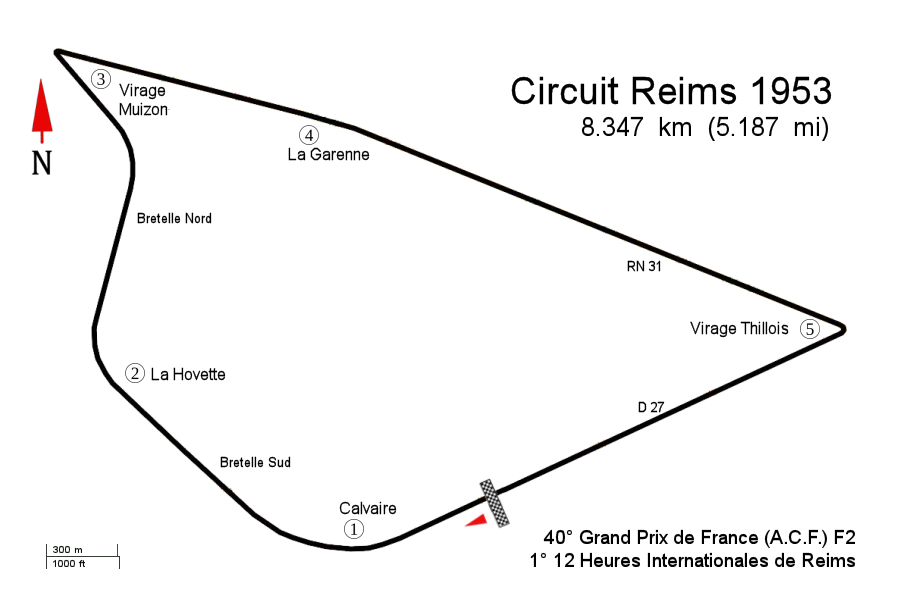
- Reims-Gueux layout

Race details
- Date: 5 July 1953
- Official name: XL Grand Prix de l'ACF
- Location: Reims Circuit, Gueux, France
- Course: Temporary road course
- Course length: 8.347 km (5.187 miles)
- Distance: 60 laps, 500.820 km (311.195 miles)
- Weather: Hot, dry

Pole position
Driver	(Italy) Alberto Ascari	Ferrari
- Time: 2:41.2

Fastest lap
Driver	(Argentina) Juan Manuel Fangio (Note: Some sources credit Alberto Ascari with equal fastest lap.)	Maserati
- Time: 2:41.1 on lap 25

Podium
First	(United Kingdom) Mike Hawthorn	Ferrari
Second	(Argentina) Juan Manuel Fangio	Maserati
Third	(Argentina) José Froilán González	Maserati

The 1953 French Grand Prix was a Formula Two race held on 5 July 1953 at Reims. It was race 5 of 9 in the 1953 World Championship of Drivers, which was run to Formula Two rules in 1952 and 1953, rather than the Formula One regulations normally used.

It is popularly known as The Race of the Century because of the sixty lap battle between Briton Mike Hawthorn and Argentine Juan Manuel Fangio. Hawthorn won the duel after they reportedly swapped the lead at virtually every corner on the Reims circuit. In addition, after 500 km of racing, the four lead cars were less than 5 seconds apart.

== Background ==
For 1953, the Reims-Gueux circuit's layout changed. The new, faster and slightly longer circuit bypassed the town of Gueux and as a result, the circuit was now called just Reims.

Coming into the French Grand Prix, Ferrari driver, and 1952 World Champion Alberto Ascari had a large lead in the championship, having won the first three races of the season (not including the Indianapolis 500 in which none of the Grand Prix contenders took part). Meanwhile, early favourite, 1951 World Champion Juan Manuel Fangio, driving for Maserati, had yet to even finish a World Championship qualifying event in 1953.

Unlike in 1952, in 1953 Maserati and Ferrari were quite evenly matched. The Maseratis had slightly more power, and hence straight-line speed, but the Ferraris had slightly better brakes, road holding, and low-end acceleration. Both works teams sent four drivers. For Ferrari there was Ascari, Luigi Villoresi, Nino Farina and Mike Hawthorn. Maserati had Fangio, José Froilán González, Onofre Marimón and Felice Bonetto. Both Ferrari and Maserati were also represented by a single private entry each, Louis Rosier driving a Ferrari and Toulo de Graffenried a Maserati.

All of the other entries had little chance of winning, as they had significantly less power than the Ferraris and Maseratis, as well as generally worse road holding. They consisted of two privately entered OSCAs (one to be driven by Louis Chiron in his last French Grand Prix start), four works Gordinis and three of each of Connaught, HWM and Cooper. The works Gordinis were poorly prepared, the team instead focusing on the 12 hour race which ran from midnight to midday on the same day as the Grand Prix. Two of the Connaughts were works entries, and were notable as the first fuel injected cars to start the French Grand Prix.

== Entries ==
Team	No	Driver	Car	Engine	Tyre
(France) Equipe Gordini	2	(France) Jean Behra	Gordini Type 16	Gordini 20 2.0 L6	E
(France) Equipe Gordini	4	(France) Maurice Trintignant	Gordini Type 16	Gordini 20 2.0 L6	E
(France) Equipe Gordini	6	(United States) Harry Schell	Gordini Type 16	Gordini 20 2.0 L6	E
(France) Equipe Gordini	8	(Argentina) Roberto Mieres	Gordini Type 16	Gordini 20 2.0 L6	E
(Italy) Scuderia Ferrari	10	(Italy) Alberto Ascari	Ferrari Tipo 500	Ferrari 500 2.0 L4	P
(Italy) Scuderia Ferrari	12	(Italy) Luigi Villoresi	Ferrari Tipo 500	Ferrari 500 2.0 L4	P
(Italy) Scuderia Ferrari	14	(Italy) Nino Farina	Ferrari Tipo 500	Ferrari 500 2.0 L4	P
(Italy) Scuderia Ferrari	16	(United Kingdom) Mike Hawthorn	Ferrari Tipo 500	Ferrari 500 2.0 L4	P
(Italy) Officine Alfieri Maserati	18	(Argentina) Juan Manuel Fangio	Maserati A6GCM	Maserati A6 2.0 L6	P
(Italy) Officine Alfieri Maserati	20	(Argentina) José Froilán González	Maserati A6GCM	Maserati A6 2.0 L6	P
(Italy) Officine Alfieri Maserati	22	(Argentina) Onofre Marimón	Maserati A6GCM	Maserati A6 2.0 L6	P
(Italy) Officine Alfieri Maserati	24	(Italy) Felice Bonetto	Maserati A6GCM	Maserati A6 2.0 L6	P
(United Kingdom) HW Motors	26	(United Kingdom) Lance Macklin	HWM 53	Alta GP 2.5 L4	D
(United Kingdom) HW Motors	28	(United Kingdom) Peter Collins	HWM 53	Alta GP 2.5 L4	D
(United Kingdom) HW Motors	30	(France) Yves Giraud Cabantous	HWM 53	Alta GP 2.5 L4	D
(Monaco) Louis Chiron	32	(Monaco) Louis Chiron	OSCA 20	OSCA 2000 2.0 L6	P
(France) Élie Bayol	34	(France) Élie Bayol	OSCA 20	OSCA 2000 2.0 L6	P
(United Kingdom) Cooper Car Company	36	(United Kingdom) Stirling Moss	Cooper T24	Alta GP 2.5 L4	D
(United Kingdom) Bob Gerard	38	(United Kingdom) Bob Gerard	Cooper T23	Bristol BS1 2.0 L6	D
(United Kingdom) Ken Wharton	40	(United Kingdom) Ken Wharton	Cooper T23	Bristol BS1 2.0 L6	D
(United Kingdom) Connaught Engineering	42	(Thailand) Prince Bira	Connaught Type A	Lea-Francis 2.0 L4	D
(United Kingdom) Connaught Engineering	50	(United Kingdom) Roy Salvadori	Connaught Type A	Lea-Francis 2.0 L4	D
(France) Ecurie Rosier	44	(France) Louis Rosier	Ferrari Tipo 500	Ferrari 500 2.0 L4	D
(Switzerland) Emmanuel de Graffenried	46	(Switzerland) Toulo de Graffenried	Maserati A6GCM	Maserati A6 2.0 L6	P
(Belgium) Ecurie Belge	48	(Belgium) Johnny Claes	Connaught Type A	Lea-Francis 2.0 L4	E

== Practice and qualifying ==
There was very little activity in the earlier practice sessions, with the Ferrari team only arriving just in time for the final session. González was the early pacesetter for Maserati, but was eventually outdone by both Villoresi and Ascari for Ferrari. González would again set the fastest time of 2:41.5, but in Bonetto's car, but Ascari would finally take pole position with a time of 2:41.2 late in the session. The front row of the 3-2-3 grid was therefore Ascari, Bonetto and Villoresi, with Fangio and González sharing row two.

The fastest six cars were separated by just 1.3 seconds, with the Ferraris and Maseratis clearly quite evenly matched. The first non-Ferrari or Maserati was the Connaught of Prince Bira with 2:53.2, 12 seconds slower than Ascari and around 2 seconds slower than Rosier in the slowest Ferrari.

=== Qualifying classification ===
Pos	No	Driver	Constructor	Time	Gap
1	10	(Italy) Alberto Ascari	Ferrari	2:41.2	—
2	24	(Italy) Felice Bonetto^{1}	Maserati	2:41.5	+ 0.3
3	12	(Italy) Luigi Villoresi	Ferrari	2:41.9	+ 0.7
4	18	(Argentina) Juan Manuel Fangio	Maserati	2:42.0	+ 0.8
5	20	(Argentina) José Froilán González^{1}	Maserati	2:42.4	+ 1.2
6	14	(Italy) Nino Farina	Ferrari	2:42.5	+ 1.3
7	16	(United Kingdom) Mike Hawthorn	Ferrari	2:43.5	+ 2.3
8	22	(Argentina) Onofre Marimón	Maserati	2:44.4	+ 3.2
9	46	(Switzerland) Toulo de Graffenried	Maserati	2:46.1	+ 4.9
10	44	(France) Louis Rosier	Ferrari	2:51.1	+ 9.9
11	42	(Thailand) Prince Bira	Connaught-Lea-Francis	2:53.2	+ 12.0
12	38	(United Kingdom) Bob Gerard	Cooper-Bristol	2:54.2	+ 13.0
13	36	(United Kingdom) Stirling Moss	Cooper-Alta	2:55.7	+ 14.5
14	40	(United Kingdom) Ken Wharton	Cooper-Bristol	2:55.8	+ 14.6
15	34	(France) Élie Bayol	OSCA	2:56.9	+ 15.7
16	26	(United Kingdom) Lance Macklin	HWM-Alta	2:57.2	+ 16.0
17	28	(United Kingdom) Peter Collins	HWM-Alta	3:02.0	+ 20.8
18	30	(France) Yves Giraud Cabantous	HWM-Alta	3:06.7	+ 25.5
19	50	(United Kingdom) Roy Salvadori	Connaught-Lea-Francis	3:23.0	+ 41.8
20	6	(United States) Harry Schell	Gordini	3:25.8	+ 44.6
21	48	(Belgium) Johnny Claes	Connaught-Lea-Francis	4:06.5	+ 1:25.3
22	2	(France) Jean Behra	Gordini	No time	—
23	4	(France) Maurice Trintignant	Gordini	No time	—
24	8	(Argentina) Roberto Mieres	Gordini	No time	—
25	32	(Monaco) Louis Chiron	OSCA	No time	—

Notes

- ^1 – González set the second placed time of 2:41.5, however he was driving Bonetto's car. Thus Bonetto started from second place, while González started in fifth with his fastest time in his own car of 2:42.4

== Pre-race controversy ==
The Grand Prix was preceded by the 12 hour sportscar race which ran from midnight to midday. During that race, the leading Ferrari, driven by Umberto Maglioli and Piero Carini, was disqualified, ostensibly for receiving a push start, and for switching off sidelights before the appointed time. Many, including Ferrari team manager Ugolini, felt this quite unfair, since the push-start had been to get clear of spilt petrol in the pitlane, and nearly every other car in the race had already switched off their sidelights by the time Maglioli did the same. Many in the crowd also disagreed with the disqualification, with the crowd booing and throwing rubbish at head officials Charles Faroux and Toto Roche.

As a result, Ferrari threatened to withdraw their cars from the Grand Prix, which would have surely handed Maserati an easy win. However, after several phone calls between Reims and Modena, the Ferraris were eventually allowed to start in the Grand Prix.

== Race ==
For the race, González decided to start with half a tank of fuel and make a pitstop in the race, while all of the other main contenders started with full tanks hoping to last the whole distance. This of course meant that González would need to build a large enough gap to make his pitstop.

At the start, from the front row Bonetto and Ascari both made good starts, while Villoresi was slow away, leaving a gap for González to quickly move into the lead with his much lighter car. At the end of the first lap González had built a 2.8 second gap over the other Italian cars, the order being Ascari, Villoresi, Bonetto, Fangio, Hawthorn, Farina and Marimón, with the gap from second to eighth just 2.2 seconds. Further back was the first of the non-Italian cars, with Bira just ahead of the Gordini of Maurice Trintignant, who had started from the back having not set a lap in practice.

On the second lap, González continued to pull away from the main pack, now led by the Ferraris of Ascari, Villoresi and Hawthorn, all disputing second place, with Farina close behind. They were followed by the Maseratis of Fangio and Marimón, with Bonetto dropping to ninth after a spin, behind Trintignant, Bira and de Graffenried. Apart from the three Ferraris contesting second place, the order near the front remained the same for the next 20 laps or so, at which point González ceased increasing his lead, making it unlikely he would be able to hold it when he made his stop.

On lap 23, Fangio overtook Farina, who responded by setting the then fastest lap of the race and retaking the position. On the following lap Fangio overtook Farina again, setting the fastest lap of the race in the process. This increase in pace of Fangio and Farina had now placed them in the middle of the three Ferraris, Fangio now in third place. Some shuffling of the pack took place by the time González made his pitstop on lap 29, with Fangio now leading it ahead of Hawthorn, with Villoresi dropping back to Marimón. González's pitstop took just 27 seconds, but this allowed Fangio into the lead, with González dropping all the way down to sixth, ahead of Villoresi but behind Marimón who had just passed him.

At half distance, Fangio lead Hawthorn and Ascari, the top three separated by less than a second, followed at small intervals by Farina, Marimón, then González and Villoresi just a second apart, around 20 seconds behind Fangio. Bonetto was over a minute and 20 seconds behind Fangio, and no other drivers were still on the lead lap.

Over the next few laps, Fangio and Hawthorn would swap the lead several times, sometimes more than once a lap, pulling slowly away from Ascari who was locked in a close battle with Farina, González and Marimón. Villoresi, meanwhile, fell back, but not enough to be challenged for seventh place. González continued to push, catching and overtaking Farina then Ascari on lap 37. This spurred Ascari on, and he and González duelled for third place over the following 20 laps. Both the duels, for first place and for third place, would last until very near the end of the race, with the drivers separated by not more than a carlength at any stage.

With two laps to go, Fangio and Hawthorn crossed the finish line side by side, followed less than a second later by González and Ascari, also side by side. Hawthorn led into the last lap, with González very close now, but Ascari well off the pace having eased off. Coming into the final straight González was able to overlap slightly on Fangio, but Hawthorn lead the pair, winning the race by just one second from Fangio, with González just 0.4 seconds behind in third place.

=== Race classification ===
Pos	No	Driver	Constructor	Laps	Time/Retired	Grid	Points
1	16	(United Kingdom) Mike Hawthorn	Ferrari	60	2:44:18.6	7	8
2	18	(Argentina) Juan Manuel Fangio	Maserati	60	+ 1.0	4	7^{1}
3	20	(Argentina) José Froilán González	Maserati	60	+ 1.4	5	4
4	10	(Italy) Alberto Ascari	Ferrari	60	+ 4.6	1	3
5	14	(Italy) Nino Farina	Ferrari	60	+ 1:07.6	6	2
6	12	(Italy) Luigi Villoresi	Ferrari	60	+ 1:15.9	3	
7	46	(Switzerland) Toulo de Graffenried	Maserati	58	+ 2 Laps	9	
8	44	(France) Louis Rosier	Ferrari	56	+ 4 Laps	10	
9	22	(Argentina) Onofre Marimón	Maserati	55	+ 5 Laps	8	
10	2	(France) Jean Behra	Gordini	55	+ 5 Laps	22	
11	38	(United Kingdom) Bob Gerard	Cooper-Bristol	55	+ 5 Laps	12	
12	48	(Belgium) Johnny Claes	Connaught-Lea-Francis	53	+ 7 Laps	21	
13	28	(United Kingdom) Peter Collins	HWM-Alta	52	+ 8 Laps	17	
14	30	(France) Yves Giraud Cabantous	HWM-Alta	50	+ 10 Laps	18	
15	32	(Monaco) Louis Chiron	OSCA	43	+ 17 Laps	25	
Ret	24	(Italy) Felice Bonetto	Maserati	42	Engine	2	
Ret	36	(United Kingdom) Stirling Moss	Cooper-Alta	38	Clutch	13	
Ret	42	(Thailand) Prince Bira	Connaught-Lea-Francis	29	Differential	11	
Ret	34	(France) Élie Bayol	OSCA	18	Engine	15	
Ret	40	(United Kingdom) Ken Wharton	Cooper-Bristol	17	Wheel bearing	14	
Ret	4	(France) Maurice Trintignant	Gordini	14	Transmission	23	
Ret	26	(United Kingdom) Lance Macklin	HWM-Alta	9	Clutch	16	
Ret	6	(United States) Harry Schell	Gordini	4	Engine	20	
Ret	8	(Argentina) Roberto Mieres	Gordini	4	Axle	24	
Ret	50	(United Kingdom) Roy Salvadori	Connaught-Lea-Francis	2	Ignition	19	

Notes

- ^1 – Includes 1 point for fastest lap

== Championship standings after the race ==
Drivers' Championship standings

	Pos	Driver	Points
	1	(Italy) Alberto Ascari	28
5	2	(United Kingdom) Mike Hawthorn	14
1	3	(Italy) Luigi Villoresi	13
	4	(Argentina) José Froilán González	11
2	5	(United States) Bill Vukovich	9

- Note: Only the top five positions are included.

== Notes ==
Previous race: 1953 Belgian Grand Prix	FIA Formula One World Championship; 1953 season	Next race: 1953 British Grand Prix
Previous race: 1952 French Grand Prix	French Grand Prix	Next race: 1954 French Grand Prix
