= Peter Collins (racing driver) =

British racing driver (1931–1958)

- Born: Peter John Collins; 6 November 1931; Kidderminster, Worcestershire, England
- Died: 3 August 1958 (aged 26); Bonn, West Germany
- Cause of death: Injuries sustained at the 1958 German Grand Prix
- Spouse: Louise King (m. 1957)

Formula One World Championship career
- Nationality: (United Kingdom) British
- Active years: 1952–1958
- Team(s): HWM, Vanwall, BRM, Maserati, Ferrari
- Entries: 35 (32 starts)
- Championships: 0
- Wins: 3
- Podiums: 9
- Career points: 47
- Pole positions: 0
- Fastest laps: 0
- First entry: 1952 Swiss Grand Prix
- First win: 1956 Belgian Grand Prix
- Last win: 1958 British Grand Prix
- Last entry: 1958 German Grand Prix

24 Hours of Le Mans career
- Years: 1952–1958
- Teams: Aston Martin, Ferrari
- Best finish: 2nd (1955, 1956)
- Class wins: 2 (1955, 1956)

Peter John Collins (6 November 1931 – 3 August 1958) was a British racing driver, who competed in Formula One from 1952 to 1958. Collins won three Formula One Grands Prix across seven seasons. In endurance racing, Collins won the 12 Hours of Sebring in 1958 with Ferrari.

Born and raised in Kidderminster, Collins started his racing career aged 17 in a 500cc Cooper 500. The 500cc category became Formula Three in 1950, where he finished third in the 1951 Autosport National Formula 3 Championship. He then progressed to Formula Two with HWM in 1952, who promoted him to Formula One that season to replace Stirling Moss, making his debut at the Swiss Grand Prix.

Collins made intermittent appearances over the next four seasons for HWM, Vanwall and Maserati; despite scoring no World Championship points, he took major wins at the 1953 RAC Tourist Trophy with Aston Martin and the non-championship 1955 BRDC International Trophy. Following his victory at the 1955 Targa Florio with Mercedes, Collins was signed by Ferrari in 1956.

He was immediately successful at Ferrari, taking his maiden wins at the Belgian and French Grands Prix amongst several podiums, and finishing third in the World Drivers' Championship. After a winless 1957 season, Collins died during the 1958 German Grand Prix at the Nürburgring, just weeks after winning the British Grand Prix. He had achieved three wins and nine podiums—with four non-championship race wins—in Formula One.

Outside of Formula One, Collins was twice runner-up in the 24 Hours of Le Mans in 1955 and 1956 with Aston Martin, as well as in the 1956 Mille Miglia with Ferrari. In popular culture, Collins was portrayed by Jack O'Connell in the sports drama film Ferrari (2023).

== Early life and racing career ==
Born on 6 November 1931, Collins grew up in Mustow Green, Kidderminster, Worcestershire, England. The son of a motor-garage owner and haulage merchant, Collins became interested in motor vehicles at a young age. He was expelled from school at 16 owing to spending time at a local fairground during school hours. He became an apprentice in his father's garage and began competing in local trials races.

In common with many British drivers of the time, Collins began racing in the 500 cc category (adopted as Formula 3 at the end of 1950), when his parents bought him a Cooper 500 from the fledgling Cooper Car Company. Success for Collins started once he switched to the JBS-Norton in 1951. Those small vehicles, powered by Norton motorcycle engines, were also the proving ground of many of Collins's F1 contemporaries, including Stirling Moss.

Collins' breakthrough came away from the track when at a party hosted by the great pre-war lady racer, Kay Petre, he managed to inveigle himself with John Wyer, the team principal at Aston Martin, earning his test drive at Silverstone. During that test, Aston was joined by the Formula 2 team, HWM – and by the time the teams were preparing to leave, Collins had a contract with both.

At HWM, Collins became part of a three-car team with Lance Macklin and Moss, and they competed in most of the F2 races in Britain and Europe. Collins showed his speed, but the underfinanced HWM-Alta rarely finished a race. His best result was second place in the Grand Prix des Sables d'Olonne. Collins got his Formula One break in 1952 with HWM when he replaced Moss. His best result in a World Championship event that year was sixth in the French Grand Prix at Rouen-Les-Essarts.

Success did not come the team's way, and Collins left after the 1953 season. Not known for his technical knowledge, Collins was happy to have his mechanics set up his car, and he simply drove it with his consummate natural skill. This was evident in 1954, when Tony Vandervell signed Collins to drive the fearsome "Thinwall Special". The potent machine was a crowd pleaser at Formula Libre events. He was also among the first to handle the "Vanwall Special" on the world stage, but he only finished seventh in the Italian Grand Prix at Monza.

After being a constant thorn in BRM's side, Collins joined the team for the 1955 season. He raced a Maserati 250F belonging to team owner, Alfred Owen, winning the BRDC International Trophy and the London Trophy. These results led to a drive with the works Maserati in the Italian Grand Prix.

Meanwhile, Collins had better success in sportscars. Throughout the first half of the 1950s, he was a stalwart performer for the Aston Martin team, scoring a sensational victory at the 1952 Goodwood Nine Hours race. The following year he took the Aston Martin DB3S he shared with Pat Griffith to victory in the RAC Tourist Trophy at Dundrod. Further successes included second place finishes in an Aston Martin DB3S at Le Mans in 1955 and 1956 with Paul Frère and Moss respectively.

== Later career ==
For the 1956 season, Collins joined Ferrari on the strength of a superb drive in the previous year's Targa Florio, in which he partnered Moss to victory in a Mercedes-Benz 300 SLR. This proved to be a turning point, with a solid second-place finish behind Moss at the Monaco Grand Prix, and wins at the Belgian and French Grands Prix. In those early days at Ferrari, Collins earned the unstinting admiration of Enzo Ferrari, devastated by the untimely death of his son, Dino, at age 24 from muscular dystrophy, Ferrari turned to Collins for solace, treating him as a member of the family.

Collins was on the verge of becoming Britain's first F1 World Champion when he magnanimously handed his Lancia-Ferrari D50 over to team leader Juan Manuel Fangio toward the end of the Italian Grand Prix at Monza. Collins eventually finished second, but the advantage handed to Moss, and the extra points gained by Fangio's finish, demoted Collins to third place in the championship. Collins's selfless act gained him respect from Enzo Ferrari and high praise from Fangio: "I was moved almost to tears by the gesture. Peter was one of the finest and greatest gentlemen I ever met in my racing career."

Meanwhile, in sports cars, Collins finished second in a Ferrari 860 Monza in the Mille Miglia and at the Swedish Sports Car GP in a Ferrari 290MM with Wolfgang von Trips in 1956; and then in 1957 he finished second in the 1000km of Nürburgring with Olivier Gendebien and won the Venezuelan Grand Prix with Phil Hill, all in a Ferrari 335 S. Finally, in 1958, he won the 1000 km Buenos Aires and the 12 Hours of Sebring in a Ferrari 250 TR with Phil Hill. These three races were back-to-back wins. His last World Sports Car Championship podium was another second place at the 'Ring with Mike Hawthorn.

Also, in 1956, Collins moved to Monaco to avoid compulsory military service in the British Army and thus continue his racing career.

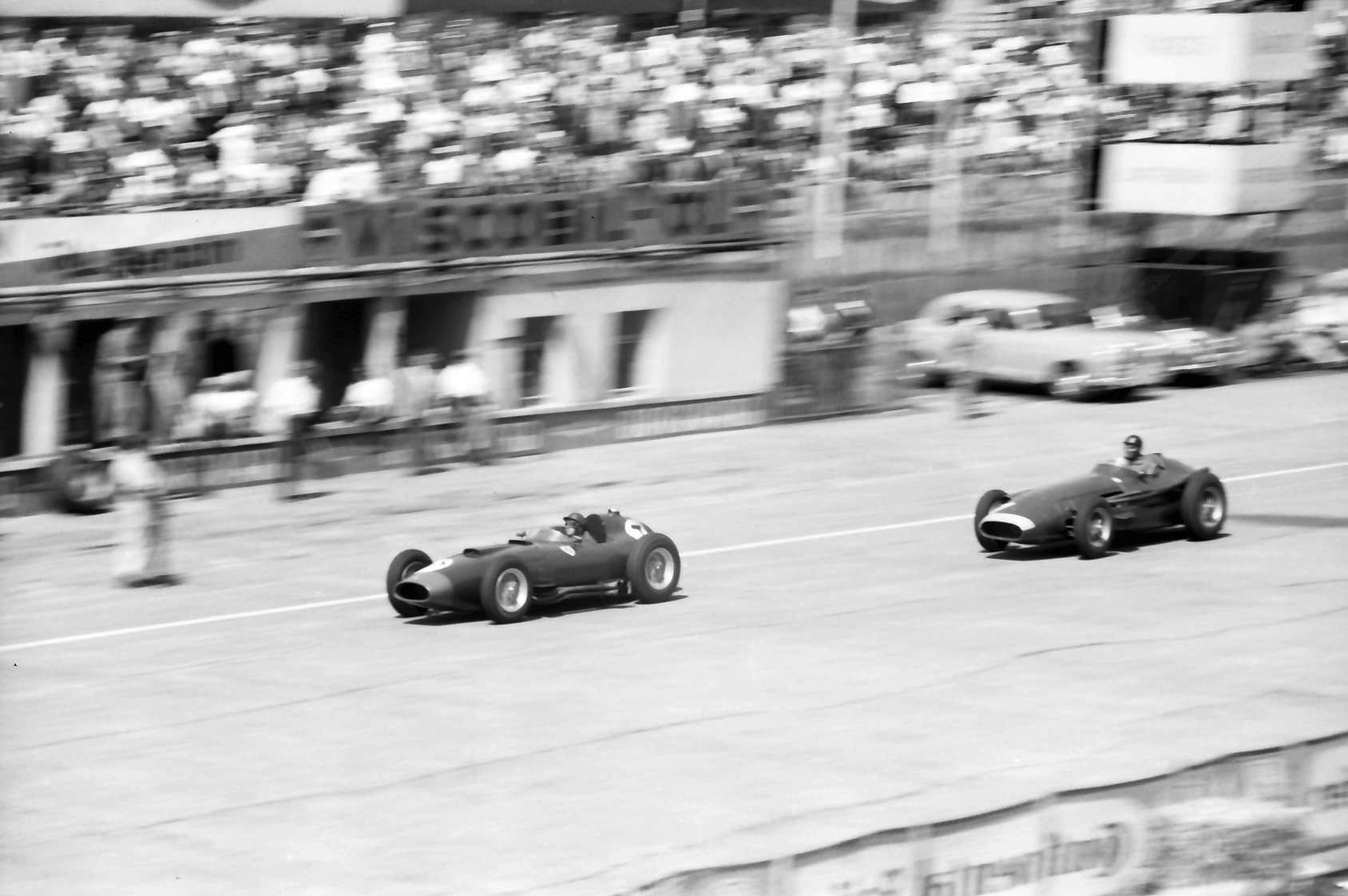
Collins, in a Ferrari 801, is chased by Juan Manuel Fangio's Maserati 250F during the 1957 German Grand Prix.

In January 1957, Collins married American actress Louise King, daughter of the executive assistant to UN Secretary General Dag Hammarskjöld, and the couple took up residence on a yacht in Monaco harbour. In the same year, Collins was joined at Ferrari by Mike Hawthorn. The two became close friends, even arranging to split their winnings between each other, and together engaged in a fierce rivalry with fellow Ferrari driver Luigi Musso. However, despite a third-place finish at the German Grand Prix, Ferrari were disadvantaged for much of the season as the 801 model (an evolution of the 1954 Lancia D50) was overweight and underpowered. However, Collins did score some wins that season, taking victory in the non-championship Syracuse and Naples Grands Prix.

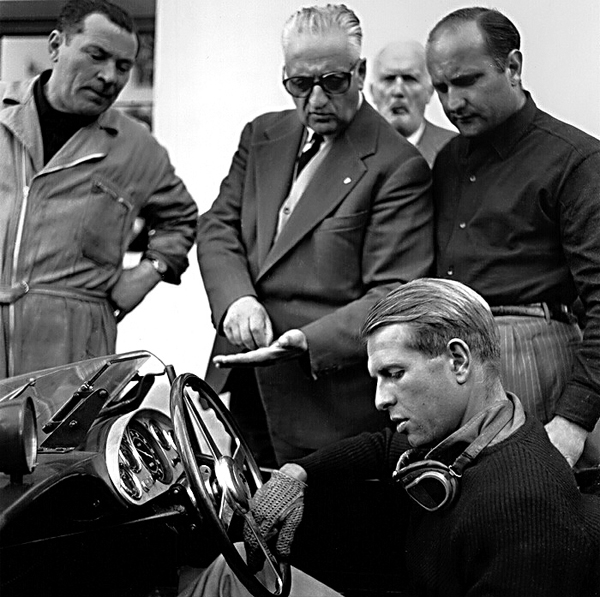
Collins with Ferrari (centre background) shortly before the 1957 Mille Miglia

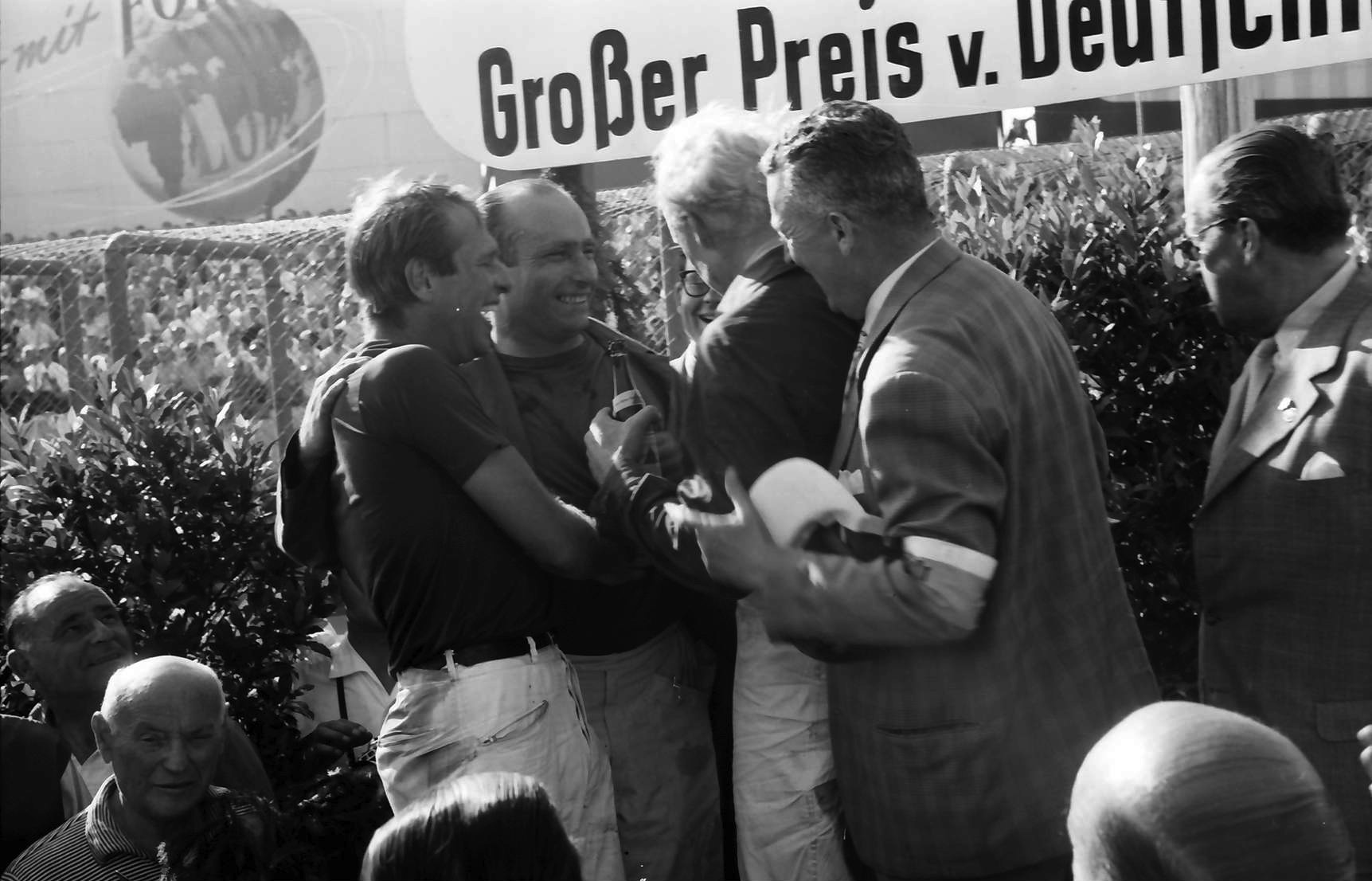
Collins (left) and teammate Mike Hawthorn celebrate with race winner Juan Manuel Fangio, after the 1957 German Grand Prix.

The year 1958 saw the introduction of the new, improved Ferrari Dino 246 and results started to improve for Scuderia Ferrari. Although achieving few results in the first half of the season, Collins improved and won the non-championship BRDC International Trophy at Silverstone, then finished third at the Monaco Grand Prix. However, Enzo Ferrari felt Collins was distracted by his "supposed" playboy lifestyle. The Monaco yacht where he lived was considered a perpetual party boat by Ferrari, who thought Collins was preoccupied and no longer focused entirely on driving and developing sports cars.

Collins was sacked by Ferrari after deliberately damaging the clutch in his car, which he shared with Mike Hawthorn during the 24 Hours of Le Mans, rather than race in a rainstorm, and was subsequently found drinking in a pub in England before the end of the race. Ferrari ultimately relented and allowed Collins to drive an F2 car until the end of the season. At the French Grand Prix at Reims, Hawthorn refused to start unless Collins was allowed to start in a F1 car. He did, and finished fifth. Ferrari immediately sacked Collins again. Hawthorn responded by flying to Italy and storming the Ferrari headquarters in Modena. Having smashed down locked doors, Hawthorn told Enzo Ferrari he would not drive for him again unless Collins was given his Formula One seat again; Ferrari again relented.

Following Musso's death at Reims, Ferrari was left without one of his top drivers, and so Collins's position was safe for now. At the British Grand Prix at Silverstone, Collins attained perhaps his greatest driving performance. Under team orders and desiring to help his friend Hawthorn win the Championship, Collins led from the start, running flat out in an effort to beat the Vanwall of Moss. Although in an inferior car to the main contenders, by driving at the limit for 45 laps, Collins gradually pulled away from Moss until his Vanwall expired and Collins won. The Ferrari team management decided not to slow Collins down and flag Hawthorn through to the win after Collins's great drive. Moss's future patron, Rob Walker, told Collins after the race that he found Collins's driving frightening and he should never drive like that again. It was his third and final career victory.

== Death ==
During the 1958 German Grand Prix at the Nürburgring, whilst chasing Tony Brooks's Vanwall, Collins had a fatal crash. After pushing hard to keep pace, Collins went into the Pflanzgarten section of the circuit too quickly, which caused his Ferrari to run wide where he encountered a ditch. Collins lost control of his car and it flipped into the air and landed upside down. Collins was thrown from the car and struck a tree, sustaining critical head injuries. Despite treatment, Collins died later in the afternoon at a hospital in Bonn. His death was almost identical to the fate which his Ferrari teammate Luigi Musso suffered. Teammate and close friend Mike Hawthorn was so disturbed by Collins's death that he retired from racing immediately after winning the 1958 Drivers' Championship. Hawthorn himself died later on the following year in an automobile accident on the A3 bypass near Guildford, Surrey, England. In Tony Brooks' autobiography, he recalled that he drove harder in that race, in the duel with Collins and Hawthorn, than at any other time in his life but, as in earlier duels with Fangio, the Ferrari pair were passing and repassing only on the safer North and South curves.

== Rivalry with Luigi Musso ==
Many years after the death of Collins, Fiamma Breschi, Luigi Musso's girlfriend at the time of his death, revealed in a television documentary entitled, The Secret Life of Enzo Ferrari, the rivalry between teammates Collins, Hawthorn and Musso. Breschi recalled that the antagonism between Musso and the two English drivers encouraged all three to take risks. She said: "The Englishmen (Hawthorn and Collins) had an agreement. Whichever of them won, they would share the winnings equally. It was the two of them against Luigi, who was not part of the agreement. Strength comes in numbers, and they were united against him. This antagonism was actually favourable rather than damaging to Ferrari. The faster the drivers went, the more likely it was that a Ferrari would win."

== Personal life ==
Collins married Louise King in 1957 one week after they met in Miami, having proposed after only two days. Louise was American, and her father was a U.S. representative to the United Nations. She would be widowed in 1958 when Collins crashed at the Nürburgring. She was interviewed in the movie Ferrari: Race to Immortality.

== Racing record ==
=== Career highlights ===
Season	Series	Position	Team	Car
1949	Silverstone 100 Mile Race	**1st**		Cooper-Norton Mk III
1950	Goodwood International Trophy [500cc]	2nd		Cooper-Norton Mk III
	"Royal" Meeting Grand Prix d'Europe [500cc]	3rd		Cooper-Norton Mk III
	Brighton Speed Trials	3rd		Cooper-Norton Mk III
1951	Autosport National Formula 3 Championship	3rd		JBS-Norton
1952	9 Hours of Goodwood	**1st**	David Brown	Aston Martin DB3
	Grand Prix des Sables d'Olonne	2nd	HW Motors Ltd.	HWM-Alta 52
	Grands Prix de France	7th	HW Motors Ltd.	HWM-Alta 52
1953	RAC Tourist Trophy	**1st**	Aston Martin	Aston Martin DB3S
	9 Hours of Goodwood	2nd	David Brown	Aston Martin DB3S
	Internationales ADAC-Eifelrennen	3rd	HW Motors Ltd.	HWM-Alta 52
1954	Whitsuntide Race	**1st**	Vandervell Products Ltd.	Ferrari Thinwall
	WECC Trophy	**1st**	Vandervell Products Ltd.	Ferrari Thinwall
	Woodcote Trophy	**1st**	Vandervell Products Ltd.	Ferrari Thinwall
	Crystal Palace Trophy	2nd	R.R.C. Walker Racing Team	Connaught-Lea Francis A
	Goodwood Trophy	2nd	Vandervell Products Ltd.	Vanwall
	Aintree International	2nd	Aston Martin	Aston Martin DB3S
	1000 km Buenos Aires	3rd	David Brown	Aston Martin DB3S
1955	Chichester Cup	**1st**	Owen Racing Organisation	BRM P30 MkII
	BRDC International Trophy	**1st**	Owen Racing Organisation	Maserati 250F
	London Trophy	**1st**	Owen Racing Organisation	Maserati 250F
	BARC Trophy	**1st**	Owen Racing Organisation	BRM P30 MkII
	Targa Florio	**1st**	Daimler Benz AG	Mercedes-Benz 300 SLR
	Les 24 Heures du Mans	2nd	Aston Martin	Aston Martin DB3S
	9 Hours of Goodwood	3rd	Aston Martin	Aston Martin DB3S
	Oulton Park International	3rd	Peter Collins	Aston Martin DB3S
1956	Giro di Sicilla	**1st**	Scuderia Ferrari	Ferrari 857 S
	Grote Prijs van Belgie	**1st**	Scuderia Ferrari	Ferrari 555
	Gran Premio Supercortemaggiore	**1st**	Scuderia Ferrari	Ferrari 500 TR Touring
	Grand Prix de l'ACF	**1st**	Scuderia Ferrari	Ferrari 555
	Mile Miglia	2nd	Scuderia Ferrari	Ferrari 860 Monza Scaglietti
	Grand Prix Automobile de Monaco	2nd	Scuderia Ferrari	Ferrari 555
	RAC British Grand Prix	2nd	Scuderia Ferrari	Ferrari 555
	24 Heures du Mans	2nd	David Brown	Aston Martin DB3S
	Sveriges Grand Prix	2nd	Scuderia Ferrari	Ferrari 290 MM
	Gran Premio d'Italia	2nd	Scuderia Ferrari	Ferrari 555
	FIA Formula One World Championship	3rd	Scuderia Ferrari	Lancia-Ferrari D50; Ferrari 555
	Gran Premio di Siracusa	3rd	Scuderia Ferrari	Lancia-Ferrari D50A
1957	Gran Premio di Siracusa	**1st**	Scuderia Ferrari	Ferrari 801
	Gran Premio di Napoli	**1st**	Scuderia Ferrari	Lancia-Ferrari D50
	Gran Premio de Venezuela	**1st**	Scuderia Ferrari	Ferrari 335 S
	Internationales ADAC 1000 Kilometer Rennen auf dem Nürburgring	2nd	Scuderia Ferrari	Ferrari 335 S
	Sveriges Grand Prix	2nd	Scuderia Ferrari	Ferrari 335 S
	1000 km Buenos Aires	3rd	Scuderia Ferrari	Ferrari 290 MM
	Gran Premio Ciudad de Buenos Aires	3rd	Scuderia Ferrari	Ferrari 801
	Großer Preis von Deutschland	3rd	Scuderia Ferrari	Ferrari 801
	FIA Formula One World Championship	9th	Scuderia Ferrari	Ferrari 801
1958	1000 km Buenos Aires	**1st**	Scuderia Ferrari	Ferrari 250 TR 58
	12-Hour International Grand Prix of Endurance	**1st**	Scuderia Ferrari	Ferrari 250 TR 58
	BRDC International Trophy	**1st**	Scuderia Ferrari	Ferrari Dino 246
	RAC British Grand Prix	**1st**	Scuderia Ferrari	Ferrari Dino 246
	Sussex Trophy	2nd	Scuderia Ferrari	Ferrari Dino 206 S
	Internationales ADAC 1000 Kilometer Rennen Nürburgring	2nd	Scuderia Ferrari	Ferrari 205 TR 58
	Coupe International de Vitesse	2nd	Scuderia Ferrari	Ferrari Dino 516
	Grand Prix Automobile de Monaco	3rd	Scuderia Ferrari	Ferrari Dino 246
	FIA Formula One World Championship	5th	Scuderia Ferrari	Ferrari Dino 246

=== Complete World Drivers' Championship results ===
(key)

Year	Entrant	Chassis	Engine	1	2	3	4	5	6	7	8	9	10	11	WDC	Pts
1952	HW Motors	HWM 52	Alta F2 2.0 L4	SUI; Ret	500	BEL; Ret	FRA; 6	GBR; Ret	GER; DNS	NED	ITA; DNQ				NC	0
1953	HW Motors	HWM 53	Alta GP 2.5 L4	ARG	500	NED; 8	BEL; Ret	FRA; 13	GBR; Ret	GER	SUI	ITA			NC	0
1954	Vandervell Products	Vanwall Special	Vanwall 254 2.5 L4	ARG	500	BEL	FRA	GBR; Ret	GER	SUI	ITA; 7	ESP; DNS			NC	0
1955	Owen Racing Organisation	Maserati 250F	Maserati 250F1 2.5 L6	ARG	MON	500	BEL	NED	GBR; Ret						NC	0
1955	Officine Alfieri Maserati	Maserati 250F	Maserati 250F1 2.5 L6							ITA; Ret					NC	0
1956	Scuderia Ferrari	Ferrari 555	Ferrari 555 2.5 L4	ARG; Ret											**3rd**	**25**
1956	Scuderia Ferrari	Lancia-Ferrari D50	Ferrari DS50 2.5 V8		MON; 2*	500	BEL; 1	FRA; 1	GBR; 2*	GER; Ret*	ITA; 2*				**3rd**	**25**
1957	Scuderia Ferrari	Lancia-Ferrari D50	Ferrari DS50 2.5 V8	ARG; 6*											9th	8
1957	Scuderia Ferrari	Ferrari 801	Ferrari DS50 2.5 V8		MON; Ret	500	FRA; 3	GBR; 4*	GER; 3	PES	ITA; Ret				9th	8
1958	Scuderia Ferrari	Ferrari 246	Ferrari 143 2.4 V6	ARG; Ret	MON; 3	NED; Ret	500	BEL; Ret	FRA; 5	GBR; 1	GER; Ret	POR	ITA	MOR	5th	14

* Shared drive

=== Non-championship results ===
(key) (Races in bold indicate pole position) (Races in italics indicate fastest lap)

Year	Entrant	Chassis	Engine	1	2	3	4	5	6	7	8	9	10	11	12	13	14	15	16	17	18	19	20	21	22	23	24	25	26	27	28	29	30	31	32	33	34	35
1952	HW Motors	HWM 52	Alta F2 2.0 L4	RIO	SYR	VAL	RIC	LAV	PAU; Ret	IBS	MAR; 7	AST	INT; 9	ELÄ	NAP	EIF	PAR; Ret	ALB	FRO	ULS	MNZ	LAC	ESS	MAR; Ret	SAB; 2	CAE	DMT	COM; Ret	NAT	BAU; 4	MOD	CAD; Ret	SKA	MAD	AVU	JOE	NEW	RIO
1953	HW Motors	HWM 52	Alta F2 2.0 L4	SYR	PAU	LAV	AST	BOR	INT; 11	ELÄ	NAP	ULS; Ret	WIN	FRO	COR; 7	EIF; 3	ALB	PRI	ESS	MID	ROU	CRY	AVU	USF	LAC; Ret	BRI	CHE	SAB; 6	NEW	CAD	RED	SKA	LON	MOD	MAD	JOE	CUR	
1954	R.R.C. Walker Racing Team	Connaught A	Lea-Francis 2.0 L4	SYR	PAU	LAV	BOR	INT	BAR	CUR	ROM	FRO	COR	BRC	CRY; 2	ROU	CAE	AUG	COR	OUL	RED	PES	JOE	CAD	BER													
1954	Vandervell Products	Vanwall Special	Vanwall 254 2.5 L4																							GOO; 2	DTT											
1955	Owen Racing Organisation	Maserati 250F	Maserati 250F1 2.5 L6	NZL	BUE	VAL	PAU	GLO	BOR	INT; 1	NAP	ALB	CUR	COR	LON	DRT	RED			AVO; Ret	SYR																	
1955	Owen Racing Organisation	BRM P25	BRM P25 2.5 L4															DTT; DNS	OUL; Ret																			
1956	Scuderia Ferrari	Ferrari 555	Ferrari 555 2.5 L4	BUE; 5	GLV																																	
1956	Scuderia Ferrari	Lancia-Ferrari D50	Lancia DS50 2.5 V8			SYR; 3	AIN	INT; Ret	NAP	100	VNW	CAE	BRH																									
1957	Scuderia Ferrari	Lancia-Ferrari D50	Lancia DS50 2.5 V8	BUE; 3	**SYR**; 1	PAU	GLV	NAP; 1	RMS; Ret	CAE	INT																											
1957	Scuderia Ferrari	Ferrari Dino 156	Ferrari D156 1.5 V6									MOD; 4																										
1957	Scuderia Ferrari	Ferrari Dino 156	Ferrari 143 2.4 V6										MOR; Ret																									
1958	Scuderia Ferrari	Ferrari 246	Ferrari 143 2.4 V6	BUE	GLV	SYR	AIN	INT; 1	CAE																													

=== Complete 24 Hours of Le Mans results ===
Year	Team	Co-Drivers	Car	Class	Laps	Pos.	Class Pos.
1952	(United Kingdom) Aston Martin Ltd.	(United Kingdom) Lance Macklin	Aston Martin DB3	S3.0		DNF	DNF
1953	(United Kingdom) Aston Martin Ltd.	(United Kingdom) Reg Parnell	Aston Martin DB3S	S3.0	16	DNF	DNF
1954	(United Kingdom) David Brown	(Thailand) "Bira"	Aston Martin DB3S	S3.0	137	DNF	DNF
1955	(United Kingdom) Aston Martin Ltd.	(Belgium) Paul Frère	Aston Martin DB3S	S3.0	302	**2nd**	**1st**
1956	(United Kingdom) David Brown	(United Kingdom) Stirling Moss	Aston Martin DB3S	S3.0	299	**2nd**	**1st**
1957	(Italy) Scuderia Ferrari	(United States) Phil Hill	Ferrari 335 S	S3.0	2	DNF	DNF
1958	(Italy) Scuderia Ferrari	(United Kingdom) Mike Hawthorn	Ferrari 250 TR 58	S3.0	112	DNF	DNF

=== Complete 12 Hours of Sebring results ===
Year	Team	Co-Drivers	Car	Class	Laps	Pos.	Class Pos.
1953	(United Kingdom) Aston Martin, Ltd.	(United Kingdom) Geoff Duke	Aston Martin DB3	S3.0	52	DNF	DNF
1954	(United Kingdom) Aston Martin, Ltd.	(United Kingdom) Pat Griffith	Aston Martin DB3S	S3.0	26	DNF	DNF
1956	(United Kingdom) David Brown & Sons, Ltd.	(United Kingdom) Stirling Moss	Aston Martin DB3S	S3.0	51	DNF	DNF
1956	(Italy) Ferrari Factory	(France) Maurice Trintignant	Ferrari 315 S	S5.0	198	6th	5th
1958	(Italy) Scuderia Ferrari	(United States) Phil Hill	Ferrari 250 TR 58	S3.0	200	**1st**	**1st**

=== Complete Mille Miglia results ===
Year	Team	Co-Drivers	Car	Class	Pos.	Class Pos.
1953	(United Kingdom) Aston Martin Lagonda	(United Kingdom) Mike Keen	Aston Martin DB3	S+2.0	16th	10th
1954	(United Kingdom) David Brown	(United Kingdom) Pat Griffith	Aston Martin DB3S	S+2.0	DNF	DNF
1955	(United Kingdom) Aston Martin Ltd.		Aston Martin DB3S	S+2.0	DNF	DNF
1956	(Italy) Scuderia Ferrari	(United Kingdom) Louis Klemantaski	Ferrari 860 Monza	S+2.0	**2nd**	**2nd**
1957	(Italy) Scuderia Ferrari	(United Kingdom) Louis Klemantaski	Ferrari 335 S	S+2.0	DNF	DNF

== See also ==
- Formula One drivers from the United Kingdom

Preceded by Luigi Musso	Formula One fatal accidents 3 August 1958	Succeeded by Stuart Lewis-Evans
Sporting positions
Preceded by José Froilán González	BRDC International Trophy; Winner; 1955	Succeeded by Stirling Moss
Preceded by Jean Behra	BRDC International Trophy; Winner; 1958	Succeeded by Jack Brabham
