= 1954 Formula One season =

8th season of FIA's Formula One motor racing

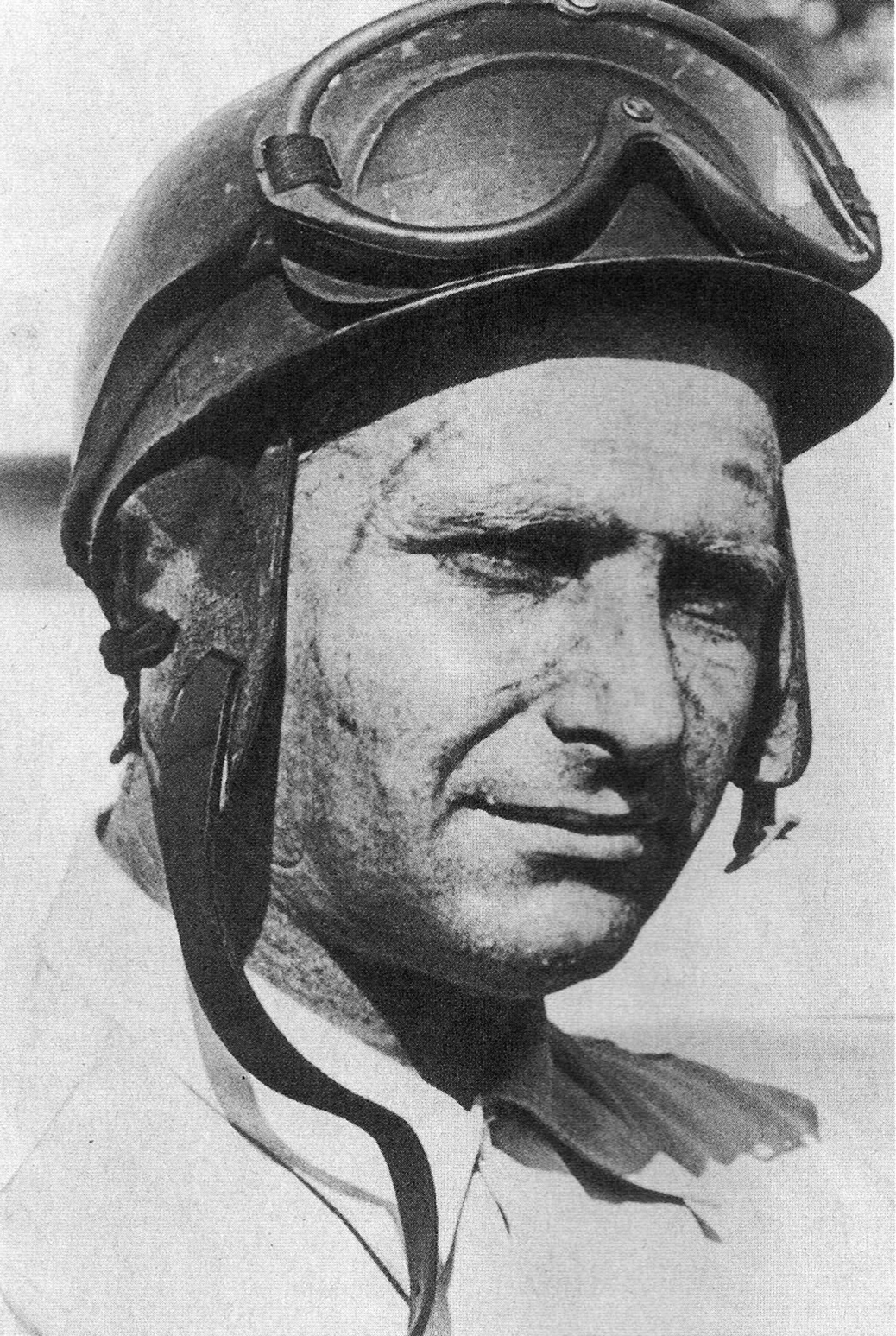
Juan Manuel Fangio (pictured in 1952) won his then record-equalling second Drivers' Championship and first of four consecutive with Maserati.

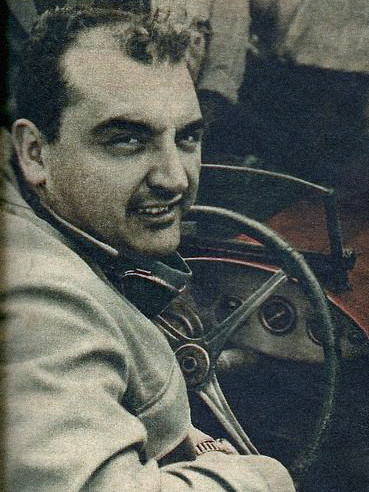
José Froilán González finished runner-up in the World Championship of Drivers with Ferrari.

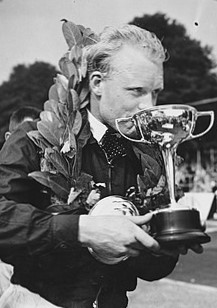
González's teammate Mike Hawthorn finished third in the World Championship of Drivers.

The 1954 Formula One season was the eighth season of FIA Formula One motor racing. It featured the fifth World Championship of Drivers, which was contested over nine races between 17 January and 24 October 1954. The season also included several non-championship races for Formula One cars.

Juan Manuel Fangio won his second Drivers' Championship, after previously winning it in 1951. After the first couple of races, he switched teams, going from Maserati to Mercedes-Benz, making him the only F1 driver in history to win a championship driving for more than one team in the same season.

After the championship had been run under Formula Two regulations for two seasons, the maximum engine displacement was increased to 2.5 litres for 1954. This increased average power outputs attracted several new constructors. At the same time, some F2 constructors withdrew, while others intended to compete but could not get an F1 chassis ready in time.

Argentinian Onofre Marimón suffered a fatal accident during practice for the German Grand Prix. Coming over one of the steep hills, he went straight through the corner at the bottom. His Maserati hit a ditch, somersaulted and landed on top of him. It was the first fatality during an F1 championship weekend.

In 1955, the movie The Racers came out, the story of which was based on the life of Rudolf Caracciola. Real-life racing footage from the 1954 F1 season was used, including in-race shots from a camera car that started behind the drivers in the Belgian Grand Prix. This approach would be recreated in the 1966 film Grand Prix.

== Teams and drivers ==
The following teams and drivers competed in the 1954 FIA World Championship of Drivers. The list does not include those who only contested the Indianapolis 500.

Entrant	Constructor	Chassis	Engine	Tyre	Driver	Rounds
(Italy) Officine Alfieri Maserati	Maserati	250F; A6GCM	Maserati 250F1 2.5 L6; Maserati A6 2.0 L6	P	(Argentina) Juan Manuel Fangio	1, 3
(Italy) Officine Alfieri Maserati	Maserati	250F; A6GCM	Maserati 250F1 2.5 L6; Maserati A6 2.0 L6	P	(Argentina) Onofre Marimón	1, 3–6
(Italy) Officine Alfieri Maserati	Maserati	250F; A6GCM	Maserati 250F1 2.5 L6; Maserati A6 2.0 L6	P	(Italy) Luigi Musso	1, 8–9
(Italy) Officine Alfieri Maserati	Maserati	250F; A6GCM	Maserati 250F1 2.5 L6; Maserati A6 2.0 L6	P	(Thailand) Birabongse Bhanudej	1
(Italy) Officine Alfieri Maserati	Maserati	250F; A6GCM	Maserati 250F1 2.5 L6; Maserati A6 2.0 L6	P	(Italy) Sergio Mantovani	3–4, 6–9
(Italy) Officine Alfieri Maserati	Maserati	250F; A6GCM	Maserati 250F1 2.5 L6; Maserati A6 2.0 L6	P	(Italy) Alberto Ascari	4–5
(Italy) Officine Alfieri Maserati	Maserati	250F; A6GCM	Maserati 250F1 2.5 L6; Maserati A6 2.0 L6	P	(Italy) Luigi Villoresi	4–6, 8
(Italy) Officine Alfieri Maserati	Maserati	250F; A6GCM	Maserati 250F1 2.5 L6; Maserati A6 2.0 L6	P	(Argentina) Roberto Mieres	7–9
(Italy) Officine Alfieri Maserati	Maserati	250F; A6GCM	Maserati 250F1 2.5 L6; Maserati A6 2.0 L6	P	(United Kingdom) Stirling Moss	7–9
(Italy) Officine Alfieri Maserati	Maserati	250F; A6GCM	Maserati 250F1 2.5 L6; Maserati A6 2.0 L6	P	(United States) Harry Schell	7
(Italy) Officine Alfieri Maserati	Maserati	250F; A6GCM	Maserati 250F1 2.5 L6; Maserati A6 2.0 L6	P	(France) Louis Rosier	8
(Italy) Officine Alfieri Maserati	Maserati	250F; A6GCM	Maserati 250F1 2.5 L6; Maserati A6 2.0 L6	P	(Spain) Paco Godia	9
(Italy) Scuderia Ferrari	Ferrari	625; 553; 500	Ferrari 625 2.5 L4; Ferrari 554 2.5 L4; Ferrari 500 2.0 L4	P	(Italy) Giuseppe Farina	1, 3
(Italy) Scuderia Ferrari	Ferrari	625; 553; 500	Ferrari 625 2.5 L4; Ferrari 554 2.5 L4; Ferrari 500 2.0 L4	P	(Argentina) José Froilán González	1, 3–8
(Italy) Scuderia Ferrari	Ferrari	625; 553; 500	Ferrari 625 2.5 L4; Ferrari 554 2.5 L4; Ferrari 500 2.0 L4	P	(United Kingdom) Mike Hawthorn	1, 3–9
(Italy) Scuderia Ferrari	Ferrari	625; 553; 500	Ferrari 625 2.5 L4; Ferrari 554 2.5 L4; Ferrari 500 2.0 L4	P	(Italy) Umberto Maglioli	1, 7–8
(Italy) Scuderia Ferrari	Ferrari	625; 553; 500	Ferrari 625 2.5 L4; Ferrari 554 2.5 L4; Ferrari 500 2.0 L4	P	(France) Maurice Trintignant	3–9
(Italy) Scuderia Ferrari	Ferrari	625; 553; 500	Ferrari 625 2.5 L4; Ferrari 554 2.5 L4; Ferrari 500 2.0 L4	P	(Italy) Piero Taruffi	6
(Italy) Scuderia Ferrari	Ferrari	625; 553; 500	Ferrari 625 2.5 L4; Ferrari 554 2.5 L4; Ferrari 500 2.0 L4	P	(France) Robert Manzon	7
(Italy) Scuderia Ferrari	Ferrari	625; 553; 500	Ferrari 625 2.5 L4; Ferrari 554 2.5 L4; Ferrari 500 2.0 L4	P	(Italy) Alberto Ascari	8
(France) Equipe Gordini	Gordini	T16	Gordini 23 2.5 L6	E	(France) Jean Behra	1, 3–9
(France) Equipe Gordini	Gordini	T16	Gordini 23 2.5 L6	E	(France) Élie Bayol	1
(France) Equipe Gordini	Gordini	T16	Gordini 23 2.5 L6	E	(France) Roger Loyer	1
(France) Equipe Gordini	Gordini	T16	Gordini 23 2.5 L6	E	(Belgium) Paul Frère	3–4, 6
(France) Equipe Gordini	Gordini	T16	Gordini 23 2.5 L6	E	(Belgium) André Pilette	3, 5–6
(France) Equipe Gordini	Gordini	T16	Gordini 23 2.5 L6	E	(France) Jacques Pollet	4, 9
(France) Equipe Gordini	Gordini	T16	Gordini 23 2.5 L6	E	(Argentina) Clemar Bucci	5–8
(France) Equipe Gordini	Gordini	T16	Gordini 23 2.5 L6	E	(United States) Fred Wacker	7–8
(France) Ecurie Rosier	Ferrari Maserati	500; 625; 250F	Ferrari 500 2.0 L4; Ferrari 625 2.5 L4; Maserati 250F1 2.5 L6	D P	(France) Louis Rosier	1, 4–6, 9
(France) Ecurie Rosier	Ferrari Maserati	500; 625; 250F	Ferrari 500 2.0 L4; Ferrari 625 2.5 L4; Maserati 250F1 2.5 L6	D P	(France) Maurice Trintignant	1
(France) Ecurie Rosier	Ferrari Maserati	500; 625; 250F	Ferrari 500 2.0 L4; Ferrari 625 2.5 L4; Maserati 250F1 2.5 L6	D P	(France) Robert Manzon	4–6, 8–9
(United States) Harry Schell	Maserati	A6GCM; 250F	Maserati A6 2.0 L6; Maserati 250F1 2.5 L6	P	(United States) Harry Schell	1, 4–6, 9
(Switzerland) Emmanuel de Graffenried	Maserati	A6GCM	Maserati A6 2.0 L6	P	(Switzerland) Toulo de Graffenried	1, 9
(Switzerland) Emmanuel de Graffenried	Maserati	A6GCM	Maserati A6 2.0 L6	P	(Switzerland) Ottorino Volonterio	9
(Argentina) Roberto Mieres	Maserati	A6GCM; 250F	Maserati A6 2.0 L6; Maserati 250F1 2.5 L6	P	(Argentina) Roberto Mieres	1, 3–6
(Argentina) Jorge Daponte	Maserati	A6GCM	Maserati A6 2.0 L6	P	(Argentina) Jorge Daponte	1, 8
(Argentina) Onofre Marimón	Maserati	A6GCM	Maserati A6 2.0 L6	P	(Argentina) Carlos Menditeguy	1
(Belgium) Ecurie Francorchamps	Ferrari	500	Ferrari 500 2.0 L4	E	(Belgium) Jacques Swaters	3, 7, 9
(Thailand) Birabongse Bhanudej	Maserati	250F	Maserati 250F1 2.5 L6	P	(Thailand) Birabongse Bhanudej	3–6, 9
(Thailand) Birabongse Bhanudej	Maserati	250F	Maserati 250F1 2.5 L6	P	(United Kingdom) Ron Flockhart	5
(United Kingdom) Equipe Moss (United Kingdom) A.E. Moss	Maserati	250F	Maserati 250F1 2.5 L6	P	(United Kingdom) Stirling Moss	3, 5–6
(West Germany) Daimler Benz AG	Mercedes	W196	Mercedes M196 2.5 L8	C	(Argentina) Juan Manuel Fangio	4–9
(West Germany) Daimler Benz AG	Mercedes	W196	Mercedes M196 2.5 L8	C	(West Germany) Karl Kling	4–9
(West Germany) Daimler Benz AG	Mercedes	W196	Mercedes M196 2.5 L8	C	(West Germany) Hans Herrmann	4, 6–9
(West Germany) Daimler Benz AG	Mercedes	W196	Mercedes M196 2.5 L8	C	(West Germany) Hermann Lang	6
(Belgium) Georges Berger	Gordini	T16	Gordini 23 2.5 L6	E	(Belgium) Georges Berger	4
(United Kingdom) HW Motors	HWM-Alta	53	Alta GP 2.5 L4	D	(United Kingdom) Lance Macklin	4
(United Kingdom) Owen Racing Organisation	Maserati	250F	Maserati 250F1 2.5 L6	D	(United Kingdom) Ken Wharton	4–7, 9
(United Kingdom) Owen Racing Organisation	Maserati	250F	Maserati 250F1 2.5 L6	D	(Italy) Guerino Bertocchi	9
(United Kingdom) Gilby Engineering	Maserati	250F	Maserati 250F1 2.5 L6	D	(United Kingdom) Roy Salvadori	4–5
(Italy) Scuderia Ambrosiana	Ferrari	500	Ferrari 500 2.0 L4	A	(United Kingdom) Reg Parnell	5
(United Kingdom) G.A. Vandervell (United Kingdom) Vandervell Products	Vanwall	Special	Vanwall 254 2.5 L4	P	(United Kingdom) Peter Collins	5, 8–9
(United Kingdom) Peter Whitehead	Cooper-Alta	T24	Alta GP 2.5 L4	D	(United Kingdom) Peter Whitehead	5
(United Kingdom) Bill Whitehouse	Connaught-Lea-Francis	A	Lea-Francis 2.0 L4	D	(United Kingdom) Bill Whitehouse	5
(United Kingdom) Leslie Marr	Connaught-Lea-Francis	A	Lea-Francis 2.0 L4	D	(United Kingdom) Leslie Marr	5
(United Kingdom) R.R.C. Walker Racing Team	Connaught-Lea-Francis	A	Lea-Francis 2.0 L4	D	(United Kingdom) John Riseley-Prichard	5
(United Kingdom) Sir Jeremy Boles	Connaught-Lea-Francis	A	Lea-Francis 2.0 L4	D	(United Kingdom) Don Beauman	5
(United Kingdom) Ecurie Ecosse	Connaught-Lea-Francis	A	Lea-Francis 2.0 L4	D	(United Kingdom) Leslie Thorne	5
(United Kingdom) R.J. Chase	Cooper-Bristol	T23	Bristol BS1 2.0 L6	D	(United Kingdom) Alan Brown	5
(United Kingdom) Gould's Garage (Bristol)	Cooper-Bristol	T23	Bristol BS1 2.0 L6	D	(United Kingdom) Horace Gould	5
(United Kingdom) Bob Gerard	Cooper-Bristol	T23	Bristol BS1 2.0 L6	D	(United Kingdom) Bob Gerard	5
(United Kingdom) Ecurie Richmond	Cooper-Bristol	T23	Bristol BS1 2.0 L6	D	(United Kingdom) Eric Brandon	5
(United Kingdom) Ecurie Richmond	Cooper-Bristol	T23	Bristol BS1 2.0 L6	D	(United Kingdom) Rodney Nuckey	5
(West Germany) Hans Klenk	Klenk-BMW	Meteor	BMW 328 2.0 L6	P	(West Germany) Theo Helfrich	6
(Italy) Giovanni de Riu	Maserati	A6GCM	Maserati A6 2.0 L6	P	(Italy) Giovanni de Riu	8
(Italy) Scuderia Lancia	Lancia	D50	Lancia DS50 2.5 V8	P	(Italy) Alberto Ascari	9
(Italy) Scuderia Lancia	Lancia	D50	Lancia DS50 2.5 V8	P	(Italy) Luigi Villoresi	9

=== Team and driver changes ===
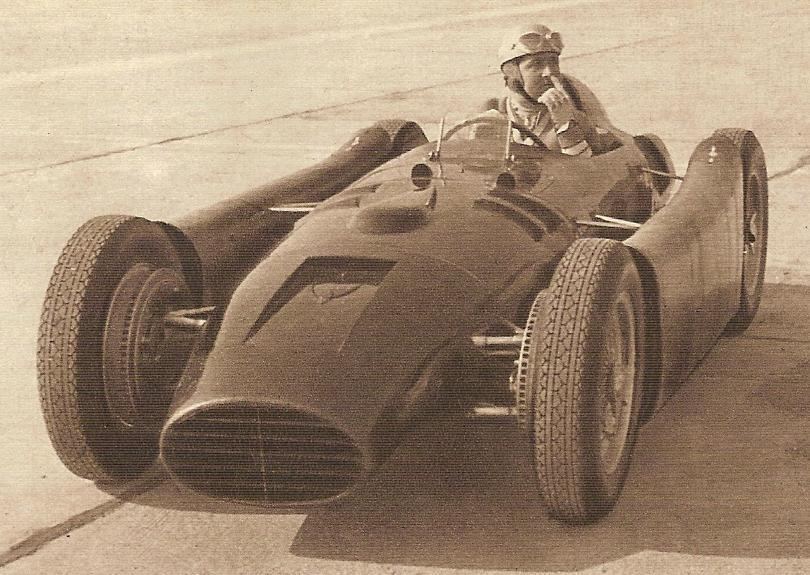
Lancia designed the D50, but it was only ready for the last race of the season.

- Cooper and Connaught did not enter with their works team, because they could not get a car prepared in time that adhered to the new regulations.
- HWM did build an F1 chassis, but it lacked pace. Driver Lance Macklin only entered one championship round and retired with engine failure.
- Veritas, OSCA and AFM withdrew from the championship because of the changed regulations.
- Over the winter, Maserati had lost their driver Felice Bonetto when he suffered a fatal accident in the 1953 Carrera Panamericana. First Prince Bira and then Sergio Mantovani took over the drive.
- After winning two consecutive championships with the team, Alberto Ascari left Ferrari over a salary dispute to join newcomers Lancia. Teammate and personal mentor Luigi Villoresi made the same change. The team hired Maurice Trintignant from Gordini.
- Gordini hired Élie Bayol, who had driven for OSCA in 1953 alongside Louis Chiron, so Harry Schell competed in a private Maserati.

==== Mid-season changes ====
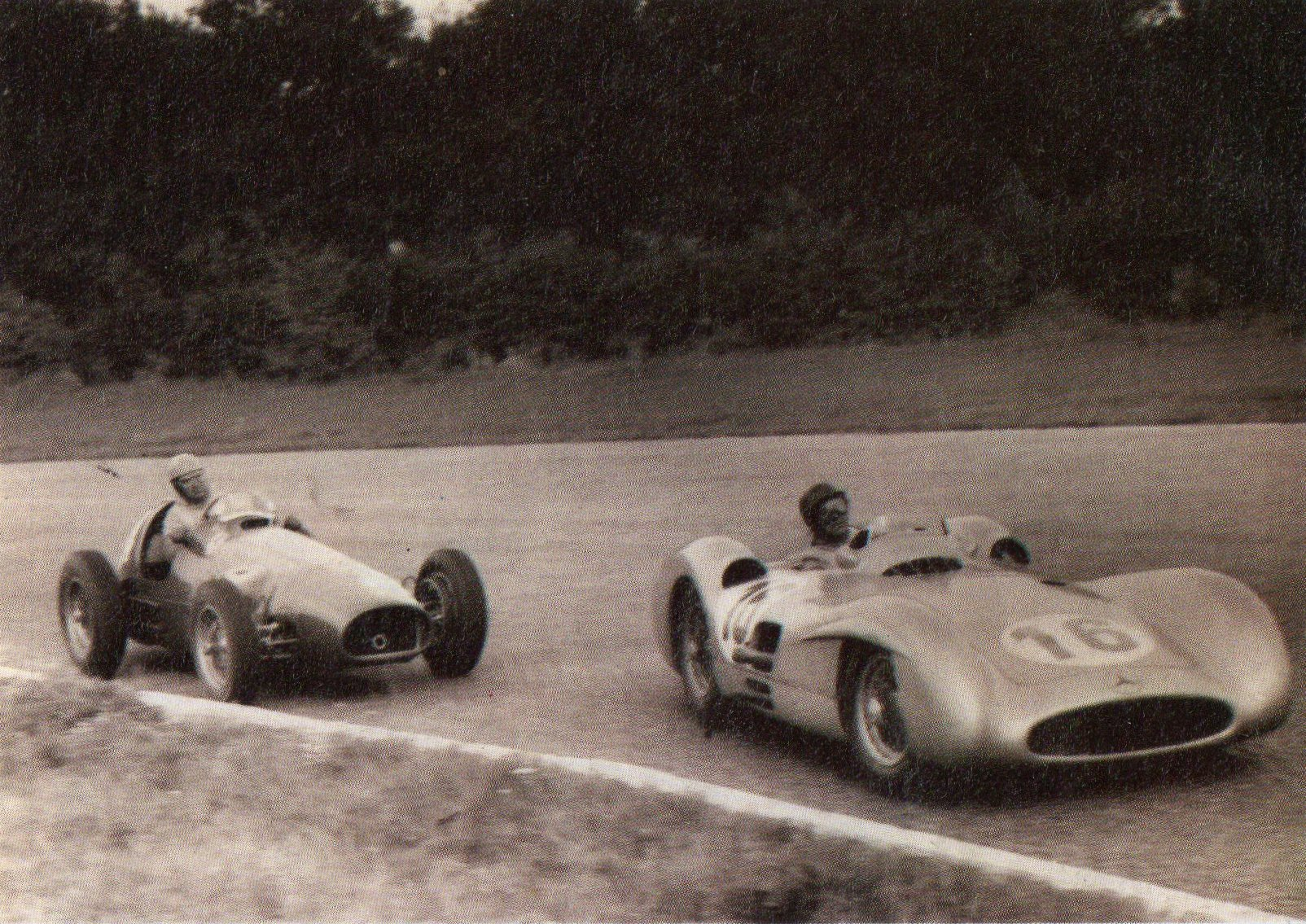
Mercedes competed with the W196, which sported closed-wheel streamlined bodywork, and was the fastest car on debut.

- Unable to get their cars ready any sooner, Mercedes joined the championship from the French Grand Prix on. Juan Manuel Fangio left Maserati to join the German squad, alongside Karl Kling and Hans Herrmann.
- At the same race, British Racing Motors, under the name of Owen Racing Organisation, returned to the sport, having done a one-off race in 1951. It would be the start of their 24-years involvement in the championship.
- Vanwall made their debut in the British Grand Prix with ex-HWM driver Peter Collins. Their chassis was prepared by Cooper.
- Lancia joined the championship as well, but could only manage to prepare their car for the last race of the season. Drivers Alberto Ascari and Luigi Villoresi were loaned to Maserati and Ferrari in the meantime.
- Élie Bayol was fired from Gordini after he refused to let team leader Jean Behra take his car during the non-championship Bordeaux Grand Prix.
- 1950 champion Nino Farina became Ferrari's team leader when Ascari left. However, on 27 June, he suffered a crash in the 1954 Supercortemaggiore Grand Prix, a sports car race at Monza, due to which he had to spend 20 days in hospital and did not return to F1 for the rest of the year.
- After Onofre Marimón suffered his fatal accident, countryman Roberto Mieres and Brit Stirling Moss, who had both been racing Maseratis under their own name, were promoted to the Maserati works team.

== Calendar ==
Round	Grand Prix	Circuit	Date
1	Argentine Grand Prix	(Argentina) Autódromo Oscar Alfredo Gálvez, Buenos Aires	17 January
2	Indianapolis 500	(United States) Indianapolis Motor Speedway, Speedway	31 May (Note: The Indianapolis 500 also counted towards the 1954 AAA Championship Car season, and was run for AAA Championship cars, but was not run to Formula One regulations.)
3	Belgian Grand Prix	(Belgium) Circuit de Spa-Francorchamps, Stavelot	20 June
4	French Grand Prix	(France) Reims-Gueux, Gueux	4 July
5	British Grand Prix	(United Kingdom) Silverstone Circuit, Silverstone	17 July
6	German Grand Prix	(West Germany) Nürburgring, Nürburg	1 August
7	Swiss Grand Prix	(Switzerland) Circuit Bremgarten, Bern	22 August
8	Italian Grand Prix	(Italy) Autodromo Nazionale di Monza, Monza	5 September
9	Spanish Grand Prix	(Spain) Pedralbes Circuit, Barcelona	24 October

=== Calendar changes ===
- The Spanish Grand Prix at Pedrables returned to the calendar for the first time since 1951. It was cancelled in the past two years due to monetary reasons.
- The Dutch Grand Prix was originally scheduled to be held on 6 June but was cancelled due to monetary reasons.

== Regulation changes ==
The maximum allowed engine displacement was increased from 2.0 to 2.5 litres for naturally-aspirated engines. The limit for compressed engines was set at 750 cc, as it had been since 1952, but no constructor would build one before they were outright banned in 1961.

== Championship report ==
=== Rounds 1 to 3 ===
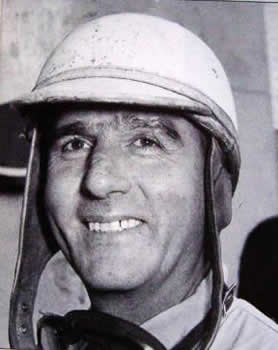
1950 champion Nino Farina scored his only podium of the year in the Argentine Grand Prix.

The championship started off with the Argentine Grand Prix. Multiple constructors intended to compete, but none of their cars were ready yet. The grid consisted of Ferraris, Maseratis and Gordinis, all of them adapting their 1953 chassis for the new regulations. 1950's champion Nino Farina qualified on pole position - he is the oldest F1 driver in history to start on pole - ahead of teammate José Froilán González and local hero Juan Manuel Fangio in the Maserati. At the start, González fell back to fourth, but after a remarkable recovery drive, he took the lead on lap 15. A third of the way in, a rainstorm arrived and the leader spun off. Farina pitted for a new helmet visor and third Ferrari driver Mike Hawthorn spun off as well. This left Fangio in a comfortable lead, until the track dried and he fell back to third behind González and Farina. A second period of rain caused the order to switch back around, putting Fangio ahead of the two Ferraris, but when the Maserati driver pitted for new tyres, he was back in third. Ferrari's team manager Nello Ugolini protested his rivals' pit stop, claiming they had too many mechanics working on the car. Confident that the protest would be granted, he signalled the leading pair to bring the cars home and not fight the charging Fangio. So they did, and they finished second and third behind the home hero. But then the FIA rejected Ferrari's protest and upheld the results, granting Fangio his first home win.

The Indianapolis 500 was included in the Formula One championship, but no F1 drivers attended. Bill Vukovich won the race for the second year in a row.

In qualifying for the Belgian Grand Prix, Fangio broke his 1951 lap record and started on pole position, ahead of González and Farina. The Argentine was contracted by Mercedes, but since their car was not ready yet, he was loaned to his former team. González was allowed into the lead when Fangio messed up the start, but when his engine cut out on the opening lap, Farina was in front. Roberto Mieres's car burst into flames, as his fuel filler cap had been left open and fuel had leaked onto the exhaust. The Maserati driver jumped out, escaping with burns on his back, and the drivers avoided his car. Fangio got up to second place by lap 2 and took the lead on lap 3. When his helmet visor broke on lap 10, he pitted to put on his goggles, but then recovered to pass Farina for the second time, just before the Ferrari engine cut out, sending the Italian out of the race. Hawthorn's exhaust pipe split, sending fumes into the cockpit and making him feel dizzy. He pitted and collapsed over the wheel, so the team dragged him out and González took over his car. The team only found out why the Brit was unwell when González pointed it out a lap later. Fangio took a comfortable win, ahead of Maurice Trintignant (Ferrari) and Stirling Moss (Maserati).

In the Drivers' Championship, Juan Manuel Fangio (Maserati/Mercedes) was in the lead with 17 points, ahead of Maurice Trintignant (Ferrari) and Bill Vukovich (Kurtis Kraft) with 8. Vukovich would not compete in any other rounds.

=== Rounds 4 to 7 ===
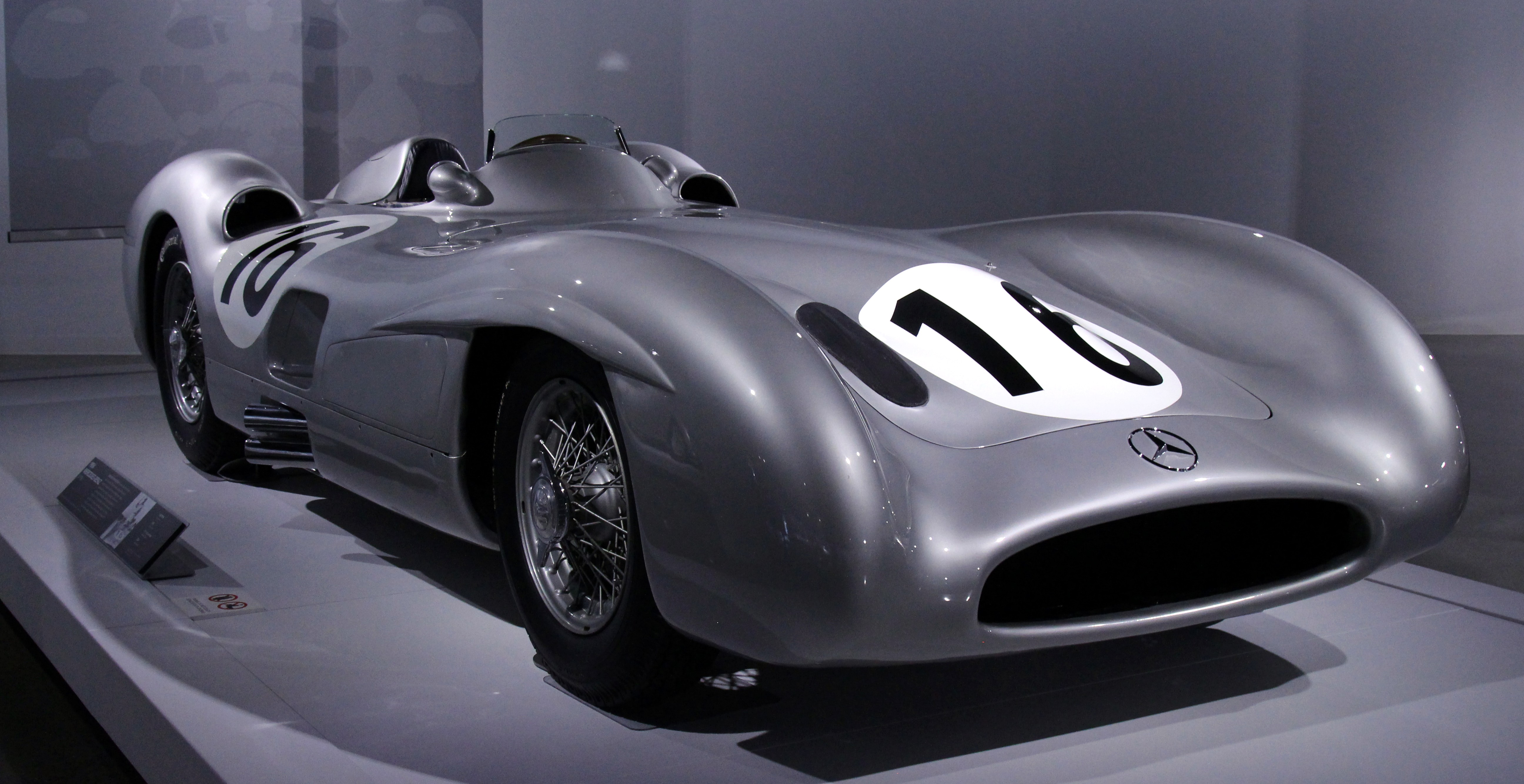
Mercedes debuted in the French Grand Prix with the revolutionary designed W196.

The long-awaited Mercedes team arrived for the French Grand Prix and their drivers were quickest of all from the get-go. Championship leader Juan Manuel Fangio could finally say goodbye to Maserati and was joined by Germans Karl Kling and Hans Herrmann. Fangio's seat was taken up by 1952 and 1953 champion Alberto Ascari, whose new employer Lancia did not have their cars ready yet. Teammate and mentor Luigi Villoresi was loaned to Maserati likewise. Fangio and Kling set the fastest times in qualifying, putting their silver-coloured streamlined W196s at the front of the grid. In the opening laps, González was the only one to stay with the leading pair, but his Ferraris overheated, so his focus shifted to keeping the third Mercedes of Herrmann behind. On lap 13, the Ferrari engine gave up. Teammate Mike Hawthorn retired with similar issues, before Herrmann broke the lap record but then stopped in a cloud of smoke. Fangio and Kling did their laps at a comfortable pace, most straights running side-by-side, only upping their pace for the final sprint. Coming out of the last corner, Fangio managed to take the win by just a couple of yards. Robert Manzon in a private Ferrari finished third out of just six finishers.

Fangio was again at pole position for the British Grand Prix, but the Mercedes' streamlined bodywork gave them less of an advantage at the Silverstone Circuit, compared to Reims two weeks ago. The Ferraris of González and Hawthorn, and the private Maserati of Stirling Moss completed the four-wide front row. González took the lead at the start and created a gap of some five seconds, while Moss and Hawthorn were in a fierce fight. Rain fell and there were several accidents. Fangio went off and damaged the nose of his car, but kept putting pressure on his countryman in front, until his pace was hindered by technical trouble and he fell back to fourth. González scored a win to be proud of, ahead of Ferrari teammate Hawthorn and Onofre Marimón for Maserati, as with 10 laps to go, Moss's back axle had failed. Fangio finished fourth on a lap down. Seven drivers set the fastest lap, as it was not measured any more precise than in whole seconds, so they all received an extra $\tfrac{1}{7}$ championship point.

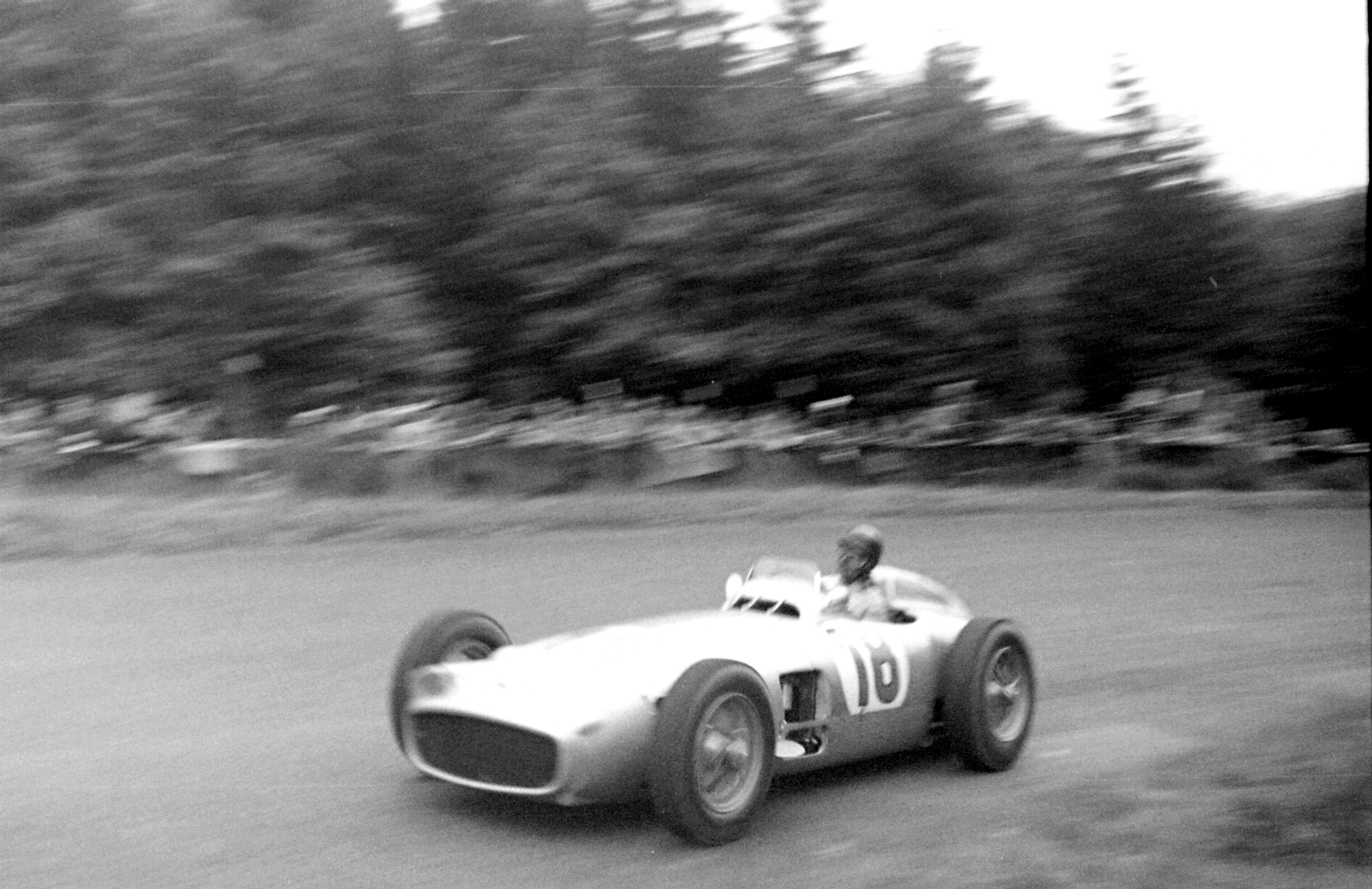
Juan Manuel Fangio won the German Grand Prix for Mercedes.

The German Grand Prix was given the honorary title of Grand Prix of Europe. Four Mercedes cars arrived, with three of them carrying open-wheeled bodywork, the team seemingly having learned from their defeat in Britain. Practice was overshadowed by the fatal accident of Marimón, one of the more popular and younger drivers on the grid, and the Maserati works team withdrew from the race. Fangio scored his third pole position in a row, ahead of Hawthorn and Moss, but it was González who took the lead at the start. Hawthorn fell back behind the fast-starting Mercedes of Lang and Herrmann. Fangio passed his countryman going into lap 2 and Moss retired with dramatic technical failing. Hawthorn retired as well, giving way to the fourth Mercedes of Kling, who had started last. Herrmann retired with a fuel leak, but when González dropped off the pace, the other Mercedes were sitting in a dominant 1–2–3. Lang, however, spun off and Kling was putting unnecessary pressure on Fangio. Hawthorn took over González's car, before Kling pitted a broken rear suspension. Fangio upheld Mercedes's honour with a win, ahead of the two Ferraris of Hawthorn/González and Maurice Trintignant, with Kling in fourth.

Fangio had the opportunity to clinch the championship in the Swiss Grand Prix. All he had to do was prevent González from winning and his lead in points would be large enough. González started on pole but immediately lost the lead to Fangio. Moss, who had been promoted to the Maserati works team, started third and was eager to put the Ferrari another place down. Hawthorn had started down in sixth but was lapping two seconds faster than the leader, and managed to overtake both González and Moss. In quick succession, Moss, Hawthorn, Trintignant and Kling retired, removing all excitement from the race. Fangio led González home by almost a minute, while Herrmann finished a lap down.

In the Drivers' Championship, Juan Manuel Fangio (Maserati/Mercedes) stood on 42 points and he had done enough to secure his second title. José Froilán González (Ferrari) was currently in second with 23$\tfrac{9}{14}$ points and Maurice Trintignant (Ferrari) third with 15.

=== Rounds 8 and 9 ===
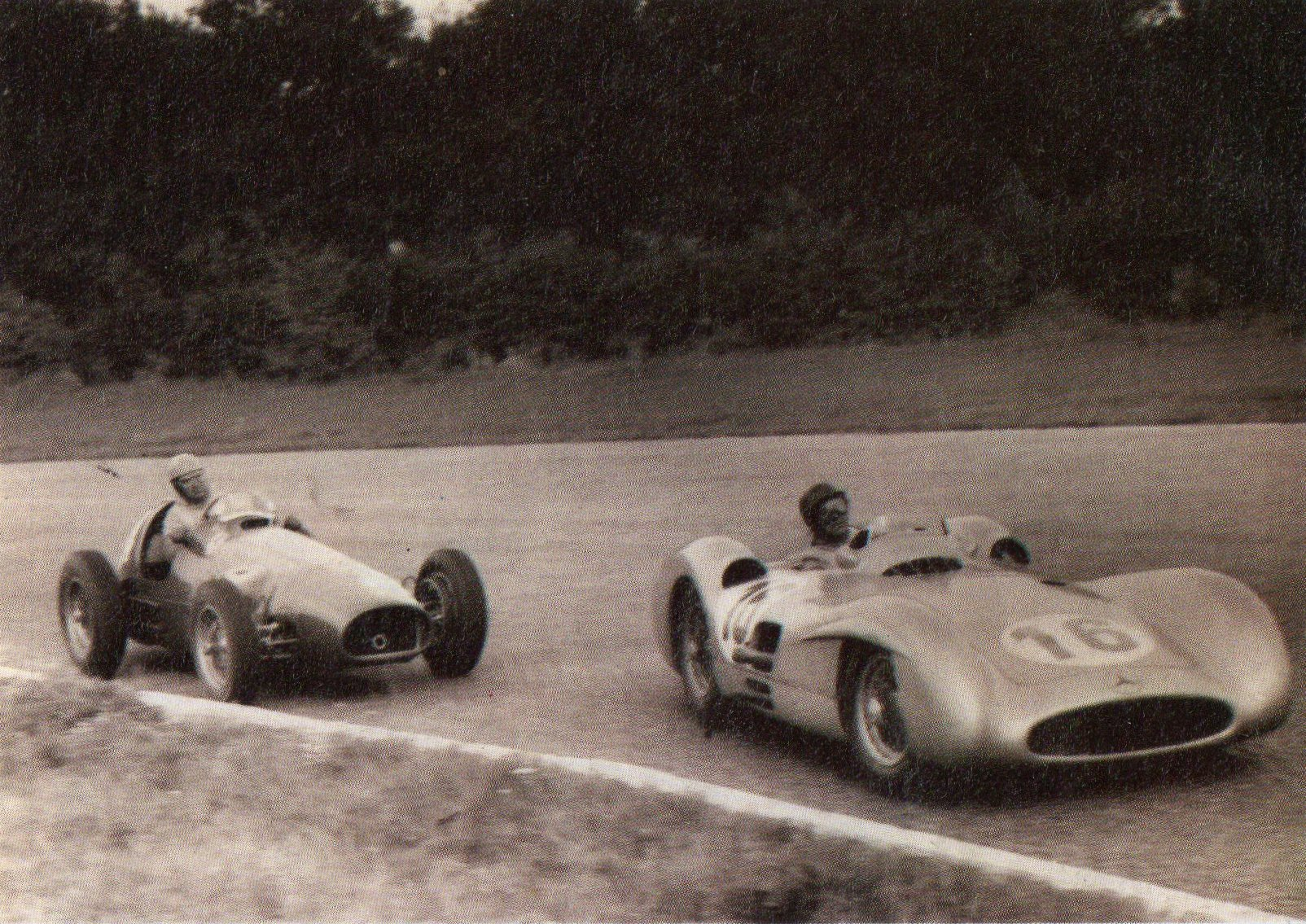
Juan Manuel Fangio leading Alberto Ascari in the Italian Grand Prix

Even with the championship in the bag, Juan Manuel Fangio showed no signs of slowing down going into the Italian Grand Prix. He scored another pole position for Mercedes, ahead of Alberto Ascari, now with Ferrari, since Lancia were still not ready, and Stirling Moss for Maserati. At the start, Fangio lost the lead to fourth-starting teammate Karl Kling and the Silver Arrows with their streamlined bodywork looked set to repeat their feat in Reims. However, Kling made a slight mistake on lap 5, bringing him down to fifth, and José Froilán González, second in the championship, managed to get alongside Fangio, before Ascari went passed all of them. González retired, so the old rivals Fangio and Ascari were free to fight. And so they did for more than twenty laps, until Maserati drivers Moss and Luigi Villoresi joined the scrap. The latter had overworked his clutch and soon dropped back, but Moss took the lead. Ascari suddenly retired with engine failure, which gave Moss the opportunity to stretch his lead, until on lap 68, his oil pressure dropped and he needed to pit. The oil was topped off, but on the next lap, it was streaming from the bottom of the car and he needed to retire. His teammate Sergio Mantovani had been fighting for second place with Mike Hawthorn, but that Maserati ran into trouble as well. Fangio won the race, just like last year, ahead of Hawthorn and Umberto Maglioli, who had taken over the car from González.

The season closed with the Spanish Grand Prix and Lancia joined the grid with their D50s. This meant that Ascari could finally try the car and he did so with success, scoring his first pole position of the year. The front row was completed by Fangio (Mercedes), Hawthorn (Ferrari) and Harry Schell (private Maserati). The latter took the lead at the start, ahead of Hawthorn and Ascari, while Fangio fell back to sixth. Ascari was in front on lap 3 and was drawing away, until on lap 9, his clutch gave out. Teammate Villoresi had already stopped on the first lap, so both Lancias had been quick but brittle. Maurice Trintignant joined the pack and took the lead. Moss joined as well, but before long retired with a failing oil pump. Schell spun off while leading on lap 29, and then retired with a broken gearbox, before Trintignant retired from the lead with similar issues. Hawthorn could relax and he brought his Ferrari home to win, ahead of Maserati's Luigi Musso, who had overtaken Fangio's Mercedes six laps from the end, to make it three different constructors on the podium.

In the Drivers' Championship, Juan Manuel Fangio (Maserati/Mercedes) gathered 42 points and won his second title, ahead of José Froilán González (Ferrari) with 25$\tfrac{1}{7}$ points and Mike Hawthorn (Ferrari) with 24$\tfrac{9}{14}$.

== Results and standings ==
=== Grands Prix ===
Round	Grand Prix	Pole position	Fastest lap	Winning driver	Winning constructor	Tyre	Report
1	(Argentina) Argentine Grand Prix	(Italy) Giuseppe Farina	(Argentina) José Froilán González	(Argentina) Juan Manuel Fangio	(Italy) Maserati	P	Report
2	(United States) Indianapolis 500	(United States) Jack McGrath	(United States) Jack McGrath	(United States) Bill Vukovich	(United States) Kurtis Kraft-Offenhauser	F	Report
3	(Belgium) Belgian Grand Prix	(Argentina) Juan Manuel Fangio	(Argentina) Juan Manuel Fangio	(Argentina) Juan Manuel Fangio	(Italy) Maserati	P	Report
4	(France) French Grand Prix	(Argentina) Juan Manuel Fangio	(West Germany) Hans Herrmann	(Argentina) Juan Manuel Fangio	(West Germany) Mercedes	C	Report
5	(United Kingdom) British Grand Prix	(Argentina) Juan Manuel Fangio	(Italy) Alberto Ascari (France) Jean Behra (Argentina) Juan Manuel Fangio (Argentina) José Froilán González (United Kingdom) Mike Hawthorn (Argentina) Onofre Marimón (United Kingdom) Stirling Moss	(Argentina) José Froilán González	(Italy) Ferrari	P	Report
6	(West Germany) German Grand Prix	(Argentina) Juan Manuel Fangio	(West Germany) Karl Kling	(Argentina) Juan Manuel Fangio	(West Germany) Mercedes	C	Report
7	(Switzerland) Swiss Grand Prix	(Argentina) José Froilán González	(Argentina) Juan Manuel Fangio	(Argentina) Juan Manuel Fangio	(West Germany) Mercedes	C	Report
8	(Italy) Italian Grand Prix	(Argentina) Juan Manuel Fangio	(Argentina) José Froilán González	(Argentina) Juan Manuel Fangio	(West Germany) Mercedes	C	Report
9	(Spain) Spanish Grand Prix	(Italy) Alberto Ascari	(Italy) Alberto Ascari	(United Kingdom) Mike Hawthorn	(Italy) Ferrari	P	Report

=== Scoring system ===
Points were awarded to the top five classified finishers, with an additional point awarded for setting the fastest lap, regardless of finishing position or even classification. Only the best five results counted towards the championship. Shared drives result in half points for each driver if they finished in a points-scoring position. If more than one driver set the same fastest lap time, the fastest lap point would be divided equally between the drivers. Numbers without parentheses are championship points; numbers in parentheses are total points scored. Points were awarded in the following system:

Position	1st	2nd	3rd	4th	5th	FL
Race	8	6	4	3	2	1

=== World Championship of Drivers standings ===
Pos.	Driver	ARG (Argentina)	500‡ (United States)	BEL (Belgium)	FRA (France)	GBR (United Kingdom)	GER (West Germany)	SUI (Switzerland)	ITA (Italy)	ESP (Spain)	Pts.
1	(Argentina) Juan Manuel Fangio	1		1^{P}^{F}	1^{P}	(4^{P}^{F}*)	1^{P}	1^{F}	(1^{P})	(3)	42 (57 1/7)
2	(Argentina) José Froilán González	3^{F}		(4)† / Ret	Ret	1^{F}*	2†	2^{P}	3† / Ret^{F}		25 1/7 (26 9/14)
3	(United Kingdom) Mike Hawthorn	DSQ		4†	Ret	2^{F}*	2† / Ret	Ret	2	1	24 9/14
4	(France) Maurice Trintignant	4		2	Ret	5	3	Ret	5	Ret	17
5	(West Germany) Karl Kling				2	7	4^{F}	Ret	Ret	5	12
6	(United States) Bill Vukovich		1								8
7	(West Germany) Hans Herrmann				Ret^{F}		Ret	3	4	Ret	8
8	(Italy) Luigi Musso	DNS							Ret	2	6
9	(Italy) Nino Farina	2^{P}		Ret							6
10	(United States) Jimmy Bryan		2								6
11	(Argentina) Roberto Mieres	Ret		Ret	Ret	6	Ret	4	Ret	4	6
12	(United States) Jack McGrath		3^{P}^{F}								5
13	(United Kingdom) Stirling Moss			3		Ret^{F}*	Ret	Ret	10	Ret	4 1/7
14	(Argentina) Onofre Marimón	Ret		Ret	Ret	3^{F}*	DNS				4 1/7
15	(France) Robert Manzon				3	Ret	9	DNS	Ret	Ret	4
16	(Italy) Sergio Mantovani			7			5	5	9	Ret	4
17	(Thailand) Prince Bira	7		6	4	Ret†	Ret			9	3
18	(Italy) Umberto Maglioli	9						7	3†		2
19	(Belgium) André Pilette			5		9	Ret				2
20	(Italy) Luigi Villoresi				5	Ret†	DNS		Ret	Ret	2
21	(France) Élie Bayol	5									2
22	(United States) Mike Nazaruk		5								2
23	(United States) Troy Ruttman		4†								1 1/2
24	(United States) Duane Carter		4† / 15†								1 1/2
25	(Italy) Alberto Ascari				Ret	Ret / Ret†^{F}*			Ret	Ret^{P}^{F}	1 1/7
26	(France) Jean Behra	DSQ		Ret	6	Ret^{F}*	10	Ret	Ret	Ret	1/7
—	(United States) Harry Schell	6			Ret	12	7	Ret		Ret	0
—	(United Kingdom) Ken Wharton				Ret	8	DNS	6		8	0
—	(United States) Fred Wacker							Ret	6		0
—	(United States) Fred Agabashian		6								0
—	(Italy) Piero Taruffi						6				0
—	(Spain) Paco Godia									6	0
—	(France) Louis Rosier	Ret			Ret	Ret	8		8	7	0
—	(United Kingdom) Peter Collins					Ret			7	DNS	0
—	(United States) Don Freeland		7								0
—	(Belgium) Jacques Swaters			Ret				8		Ret	0
—	(Switzerland) Toulo de Graffenried	8								Ret†	0
—	(United States) Paul Russo		8								0
—	(United States) Larry Crockett		9								0
—	(United States) Cal Niday		10								0
—	(United Kingdom) Bob Gerard					10					0
—	(Argentina) Jorge Daponte	Ret							11		0
—	(United States) Art Cross		11								0
—	(United Kingdom) Don Beauman					11					0
—	(United States) Chuck Stevenson		12								0
—	(United States) Manny Ayulo		13								0
—	(United Kingdom) Leslie Marr					13					0
—	(United States) Bob Sweikert		14								0
—	(United Kingdom) Leslie Thorne					14					0
—	(United Kingdom) Horace Gould					15					0
—	(United States) Jimmy Jackson		15†								0
—	(United States) Ernie McCoy		16								0
—	(United States) Jimmy Reece		17								0
—	(United States) Ed Elisian		18								0
—	(United States) Frank Armi		19								0
—	(Argentina) Clemar Bucci					Ret	Ret	Ret	Ret		0
—	(Belgium) Paul Frère			Ret	Ret		Ret				0
—	(United Kingdom) Roy Salvadori				Ret	Ret					0
—	(France) Jacques Pollet				Ret					Ret	0
—	(France) Roger Loyer	Ret									0
—	(United States) Sam Hanks		Ret								0
—	(United States) Pat O'Connor		Ret								0
—	(United States) Rodger Ward		Ret								0
—	(United States) Gene Hartley		Ret								0
—	(United States) Andy Linden		Ret								0
—	(United States) Johnny Thomson		Ret								0
—	(United States) Jerry Hoyt		Ret								0
—	(United States) Jimmy Daywalt		Ret								0
—	(United States) Tony Bettenhausen		Ret								0
—	(United States) Spider Webb		Ret								0
—	(United States) Bill Homeier		Ret								0
—	(United States) Johnnie Parsons		Ret								0
—	(United States) Len Duncan		Ret								0
—	(United States) Pat Flaherty		Ret†								0
—	(United States) Jim Rathmann		Ret†								0
—	(United Kingdom) Lance Macklin				Ret						0
—	(Belgium) Georges Berger				Ret						0
—	(United Kingdom) Bill Whitehouse					Ret					0
—	(United Kingdom) John Riseley-Prichard					Ret					0
—	(United Kingdom) Reg Parnell					Ret					0
—	(United Kingdom) Peter Whitehead					Ret					0
—	(United Kingdom) Eric Brandon					Ret					0
—	(United Kingdom) Ron Flockhart					Ret†					0
—	(West Germany) Hermann Lang						Ret				0
—	(West Germany) Theo Helfrich						Ret				0
—	(Switzerland) Ottorino Volonterio									Ret†	0
—	(Argentina) Carlos Menditeguy	DNS									0
—	(United Kingdom) Alan Brown					DNS					0
—	(United Kingdom) Rodney Nuckey					DNS					0
—	(Italy) Giovanni de Riu								DNQ		0
Pos.	Driver	ARG (Argentina)	500‡ (United States)	BEL (Belgium)	FRA (France)	GBR (United Kingdom)	GER (West Germany)	SUI (Switzerland)	ITA (Italy)	ESP (Spain)	Pts.

Key
Colour	Result
Gold	Winner
Silver	Second place
Bronze	Third place
Green	Other points position
Blue	Other classified position
Blue	Not classified, finished (NC)
Purple	Not classified, retired (Ret)
Red	Did not qualify (DNQ)
Black	Disqualified (DSQ)
White	Did not start (DNS)
White	Race cancelled (C)
Blank	Did not practice (DNP)
Blank	Excluded (EX)
Blank	Did not arrive (DNA)
Blank	Withdrawn (WD)
Blank	Did not enter (empty cell)
Annotation	Meaning
P	Pole position
F	Fastest lap

- † Position shared between multiple drivers of the same car.
- * Fastest lap shared between multiple drivers.
- ‡ Several cars were shared in this race. See the race page for details.

== Non-championship races ==
The following is a summary of the races for Formula One cars staged during the 1954 season that did not count towards the 1954 World Championship of Drivers.

Race name	Circuit	Date	Winning driver	Constructor	Report
(Italy) IV Gran Premio di Siracusa	Syracuse	11 April	(Italy) Nino Farina	(Italy) Ferrari	Report
(France) XV Pau Grand Prix	Pau	19 April	(France) Jean Behra	(France) Gordini	Report
(United Kingdom) VI Lavant Cup	Goodwood	19 April	(United Kingdom) Reg Parnell	(Italy) Ferrari	Report
(France) III Grand Prix de Bordeaux	Bordeaux	9 May	(Argentina) José Froilán González	(Italy) Ferrari	Report
(United Kingdom) VI BRDC International Trophy	Silverstone	15 May	(Argentina) José Froilán González	(Italy) Ferrari	Report
(Italy) VII Gran Premio di Bari	Bari	22 May	(Argentina) José Froilán González	(Italy) Ferrari	Report
(United Kingdom) II Curtis Trophy	Snetterton	5 June	(United Kingdom) Roy Salvadori	(Italy) Maserati	Report
(Italy) XIII Gran Premio di Roma	Castelfusano	6 June	(Argentina) Onofre Marimón	(Italy) Maserati	Report
(Belgium) XXIV Grand Prix des Frontières	Chimay	6 June	(Thailand) Birabongse Bhanudej	(Italy) Maserati	Report
(United Kingdom) I Cornwall MRC Formula 1 Race	Davidstow	7 June	(United Kingdom) John Riseley-Prichard	(United Kingdom) Connaught-Lea Francis	Report
(United Kingdom) I BARC Formula 1 Race	Goodwood	7 June	(United Kingdom) Reg Parnell	(Italy) Ferrari	Report
(United Kingdom) II Crystal Palace Trophy	Crystal Palace	19 June	(United Kingdom) Reg Parnell	(Italy) Ferrari	Report
(France) IV Grand Prix de Rouen-les-Essarts	Rouen	11 July	(France) Maurice Trintignant	(Italy) Ferrari	Report
(France) III Grand Prix de Caen	Caen	25 July	(France) Maurice Trintignant	(Italy) Ferrari	Report
(United Kingdom) I August Cup	Crystal Palace	2 August	(United Kingdom) Reg Parnell	(Italy) Ferrari	Report
(United Kingdom) II Cornwall MRC Formula 1 Race	Davidstow	2 August	(United Kingdom) John Coombs	(United Kingdom) Lotus-Lea Francis	Report
(United Kingdom) I International Gold Cup	Oulton Park	7 August	(United Kingdom) Stirling Moss	(Italy) Maserati	Report
(United Kingdom) II RedeX Trophy	Snetterton	14 August	(United Kingdom) Reg Parnell	(Italy) Ferrari	Report
(Italy) XXIII Circuito di Pescara	Pescara	15 August	(Italy) Luigi Musso	(Italy) Maserati	Report
(United Kingdom) III Joe Fry Memorial Trophy	Castle Combe	28 August	(United Kingdom) Horace Gould	(United Kingdom) Cooper-Bristol	Report
(France) V Circuit de Cadours	Cadours	12 September	(France) Jean Behra	(France) Gordini	Report
(West Germany) I Grosser Preis von Berlin	AVUS	19 September	(West Germany) Karl Kling	(West Germany) Mercedes	Report
(United Kingdom) VII Goodwood Trophy	Goodwood	25 September	(United Kingdom) Stirling Moss	(Italy) Maserati	Report
(United Kingdom) I Daily Telegraph Trophy	Aintree	2 October	(United Kingdom) Stirling Moss	(Italy) Maserati	Report
