= 1954 Goodwood Trophy =

- Non-championship race in the 1954 Formula One season

Race details
- Date: 25 September 1954
- Official name: VII Goodwood Trophy
- Location: Goodwood Circuit, West Sussex
- Course: Permanent racing facility
- Course length: 3.809 km (2.367 miles)
- Distance: 21 laps, 79.989 km (49.707 miles)

Pole position
Driver	(United Kingdom) Stirling Moss	Maserati
- Time: 1:32.1

Fastest lap
Driver	(United Kingdom) Stirling Moss	Maserati
- Time: 1:33.0

Podium
First	(United Kingdom) Stirling Moss	Maserati
Second	(United Kingdom) Peter Collins	Vanwall
Third	(United Kingdom) Roy Salvadori	Maserati

The 7th Goodwood Trophy was a motor race, run to Formula One rules, held on 25 September 1954 at Goodwood Circuit, West Sussex. The race was run over 21 laps of the circuit and was won by British driver Stirling Moss in a Maserati 250F. Peter Collins was second in a Vanwall and Roy Salvadori third in a 250F.

== Results ==
Pos	No.	Driver	Entrant	Car	Time/Retired	Grid
1	7	(United Kingdom) Stirling Moss	Officine Alfieri Maserati	Maserati 250F	33:03.2, 91.48 mph	1
2	8	(United Kingdom) Peter Collins	Vandervell Products Ltd.	Vanwall Special	+20.4s	2
3	10	(United Kingdom) Roy Salvadori	Gilby Engineering	Maserati 250F	+1:17.4	5
4	11	(United Kingdom) Bob Gerard	F.R. Gerard	Cooper T23-Bristol	+1:21.6	3
5	23	(United Kingdom) Don Beauman	Sir Jeremy Boles	Connaught Type A-Lea Francis	+1:25.2	15
6	24	(United Kingdom) Mike Keen	R.J. Chase	Cooper T23-Alta	+1 lap	8
7	21	(United Kingdom) John Riseley-Prichard	John Riseley-Prichard	Connaught Type A-Lea Francis	+1 lap	7
8	1	(United Kingdom) Louis Rosier	Equipe Rosier	Maserati 250F	+1 lap	12
9	20	(United Kingdom) Leslie Marr	Leslie Marr	Connaught Type A-Lea Francis	+1 lap	6
10	17	(United Kingdom) Jock Lawrence	Ecurie Ecosse	Cooper T20-Bristol	+1 lap	13
11	26	(United Kingdom) Keith Hall	Border Reivers	Cooper T20-Bristol	+2 laps	17
12	16	(United Kingdom) Dick Gibson	R. Gibson	Cooper T23-Bristol	+2 laps	18
Ret	19	(United Kingdom) Michael Young	Roebuck Engineering	Connaught Type A-Lea Francis	19 laps, mechanical	14
Ret	18	(United Kingdom) Peter Hughes	Ecurie Ecosse	Connaught Type A-Lea Francis	+4 laps, piston	11
Ret	15	(United Kingdom) Bruce Halford	Equipe Devone	Cooper T20-Bristol	11 laps	20
Ret	14	(United Kingdom) Horace Gould	Gould's Garage (Bristol)	Maserati 250F	10 laps, mechanical	9
Ret	22	(United Kingdom) Charles Boulton	Ecurie Ane	Connaught Type A-Lea Francis	9 laps	16
Ret	28	(United Kingdom) Ted Whiteaway	E.N. Whiteaway	HWM-Alta	5 laps, mechanical	21
Ret	25	(United Kingdom) Horace Richards	H.A. Richards	H.A.R.-Riley	4 laps	19
Ret	27	(United Kingdom) Paul Emery	Emeryson Cars	Emeryson Mk.1-Alta	4 laps	10
Ret	5	(United Kingdom) Reg Parnell	Scuderia Ambrosiana	Ferrari 625	3 laps, piston	4
DNS	2	(United Kingdom) Ken Wharton	Owen Racing Organisation	Maserati 250F	car damaged in practice	22
DNA	12	(United Kingdom) Rodney Nuckey	Ecurie Richmond	Cooper T23-Bristol		-

Previous race: 1954 Berlin Grand Prix	Formula One non-championship races 1954 season	Next race: 1954 Daily Telegraph Trophy
Previous race: 1953 Goodwood Trophy	Goodwood Trophy	Next race: 1956 Goodwood Trophy
