= Cornwall MRC Formula 1 Race =

UK series of non-championship motor races

The Cornwall MRC Formula 1 Race was a series of non-championship motor races run according to Formula One rules, held at Davidstow Circuit, in Cornwall, UK.

== History ==
Davidstow Circuit was built on the site of former Royal Air Force base RAF Davidstow Moor, using the perimeter roads and runways of the airfield, and held its first race meeting in 1952. The circuit was renowned for its poor weather conditions, thick fog and torrential rain being a frequent occurrence, and its altitude. The circuit was almost 1000 ft above sea level and situated near Brown Willy, the highest point on Bodmin Moor. Facilities at the track were basic – latrines were dug into the ground, and spectators were separated from the race track by waist-high scaffolding bars.

The Formula One race was first held on 7 June 1954 and was staged on two more occasions, a second fixture in 1954 and one in 1955, before the event was abandoned. Following the last of these events the circuit ceased to host motor racing events. These races marked the first victories in Formula One for both Lotus and Connaught.

Although officially classified as Formula One races, the majority of drivers competed in obsolescent 2-litre Formula Two cars. In fact over the course of the three F1 races held at the circuit, only a single Formula One car took part: Leslie Marr drove his streamlined Connaught to a comfortable victory in the 1955 event.

== Results ==
The Formula One races at Davidstow generally had very small fields due to its remote location and rudimentary facilities. The 1955 event had just six starters, as did the second race of 1954, while the inaugural event saw seven cars on the grid for the start.

| Year | Date | Winning driver | Winning constructor | Report |
|---|---|---|---|---|
| 1954 (I) | June 7 | (United Kingdom) John Riseley-Prichard | Connaught | Report |
| 1954 (II) | August 2 | (United Kingdom) John Coombs | Lotus-Connaught | Report |
| 1955 | May 30 | (United Kingdom) Leslie Marr | Connaught | Report |
