= 1955 Cornwall MRC Formula 1 Race =

- Non-championship race in the 1955 Formula One season
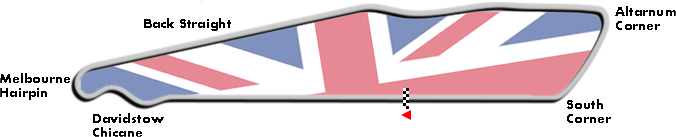

Race details
- Date: 30 May 1955
- Official name: III Cornwall MRC Formula 1 Race
- Location: Davidstow Circuit, Davidstow, Cornwall
- Course: Permanent racing facility
- Course length: 2.973 km (1.8475 miles)
- Distance: 20 laps, 59.46 km (36.95 miles)
- Weather: Dry, sunny

Pole position
Driver	(United Kingdom) Leslie Marr	Connaught-Alta

Fastest lap
Driver	(United Kingdom) Leslie Marr	Connaught-Alta
- Time: 1:15.4

Podium
First	(United Kingdom) Leslie Marr	Connaught-Alta
Second	(United Kingdom) Charles Boulton	Connaught-Lea Francis
Third	(United Kingdom) Tom Kyffin	Cooper-Bristol

The 3rd Cornwall MRC Formula 1 Race was a motor race, run to Formula One rules, held on 30 May 1955 at the Davidstow Circuit, Cornwall. The race was run over 20 laps of the little circuit, and was won by British driver Leslie Marr in a Connaught Type B.

This was the third and last Formula One race to be held in Cornwall.

== Results ==
Pos	Driver	Entrant	Constructor	Time/Retired	Grid
1	(United Kingdom) Leslie Marr	L. Marr	Connaught-Alta	25:57.2	1
2	(United Kingdom) Charles Boulton	Ecurie Ane	Connaught-Lea Francis	20 laps	3
3	(United Kingdom) Tom Kyffin	Equipe Devone	Cooper-Bristol	20 laps	2
4	(United Kingdom) Dick Gibson	Tony Crook	Cooper-Bristol	19 laps	6
5	(United Kingdom) Freddie Sowrey	F. Sowrey	Cooper-JAP	19 laps	5
Ret	(United Kingdom) Robert Harris	Dick Gibson	Connaught-Lea Francis		4
DNS	(United Kingdom) Gordon Rolls	G.H. & J.F. Rolls	Tojeiro-Bristol		-
WD	(United Kingdom) Ken Tyrrell	R.K. Tyrrell	Cooper-Norton		-
WD	(United Kingdom) Tony Crook	Tony Crook	Cooper-Bristol	Car raced by Gibson	-
DNA	(United Kingdom) Tony Rolt	Rob Walker Racing Team	Connaught-Alta	Car not ready	-
DNA	(United Kingdom) Peter Collins †	Owen Racing Organisation	Maserati	Raced elsewhere	-

† Collins entered a Maserati 250F but elected to race at Crystal Palace instead.

Previous race: 1955 Curtis Trophy	Formula One non-championship races 1955 season	Next race: 1955 London Trophy
Previous race: 1954 II Cornwall MRC Formula 1 Race	Cornwall MRC Formula 1 Race	Next race: —
