= Davidstow Circuit =

Motor racing circuit and airfield in Cornwall, England

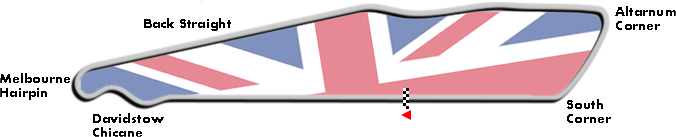
- 1953-1955 Track Layout
- Location: Cornwall, UK
- Coordinates: 50.639°N 4.618°W
- Opened: 1952
- Closed: 1955
- Major events: F1

1952 Circuit
- Length: 4.2 km (2.6 mi)
- Race lap record: (Leslie Marr, F1, Connaught-Alta B3 (89.88mph), 1955)

1953-1955 Circuit
- Length: 3.1 km (1.9 mi)

Davidstow Circuit is a disused motor racing circuit and airfield built in Cornwall, in the United Kingdom. The circuit was built on the site of a World War II RAF Coastal Command base, RAF Davidstow Moor, opened in 1942. Davidstow circuit opened in 1952, and held three Formula 1 races between 1954 and 1955. The circuit hosted its last race in 1955, and was one of many of Britain's airfields to be transformed into motor racing venues. Davidstow circuit is notable for the first victory in a Formula One race by a Lotus.

== Track layout ==
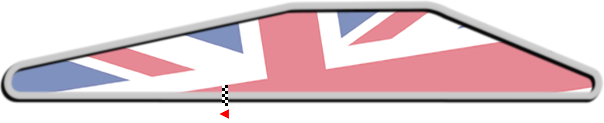
Davidstow circuit layout 1952

The original track layout of Davidstow circuit was used in 1952 and contained three corners; some drivers considered this layout straightforward. The track was 4.2 km (2.6 mi) long and used the main runways of RAF Davidstow Moor.

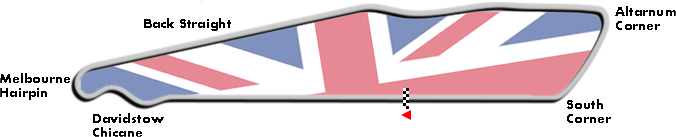
Davidstow circuit layout 1953-55

The layout of Davidstow Circuit was changed for 1953. This layout was kept for 1954 and 1955 as well. The new layout contained a chicane before the first corner and was considerably shorter. This layout cut out the end of the original layout, which meant that this layout was only 3.1 km (1.9 mi) long. The start/finish straight remained in the same place on this layout.

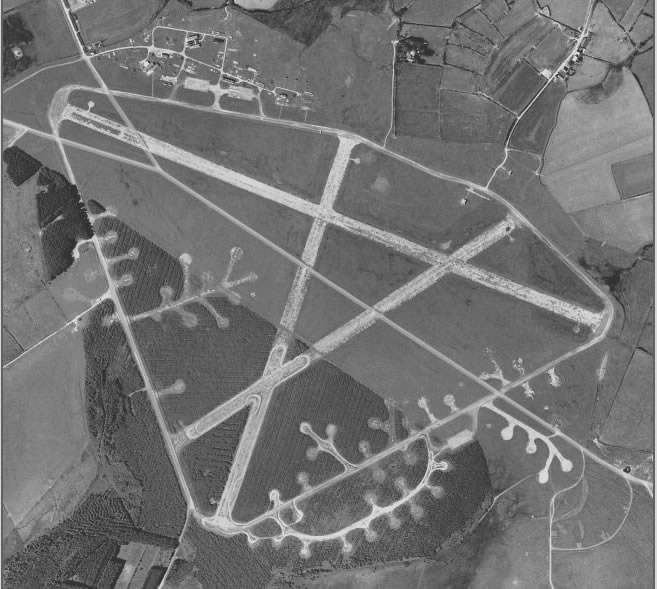
RAF Davidstow Airfield - 2 June 1951. The circuit can be seen to use the runway and perimeter roads at the top of the picture.

== Motorsport activities ==
Motor racing commenced on 9 August 1952 when three races were run over the 2.6 mile circuit; from 1953, the shorter 1.85 mile circuit was used.

Davidstow ran 44 races. The first race meetings were organised by the Cornish Vintage Car Club – itself only founded in 1949 – and by the Plymouth Motor Club which was formed in 1908. When the racing arrived, it was hampered by the weather. The preceding few days had seen members of the promoting clubs working in all conditions to prepare the track and facilities and as race day dawned there was no let-up in the weather. Despite this, the expected crowd of 800 had been surpassed when 3,000 arrived. Even with the weather, the crowds at the track were still spectators to the races.

If Davidstow had one clear advantage over other circuits it was that there was a distinct absence of complaining populace. Two meetings were planned for 1953, on the Whitsun Bank Holiday Monday and on 1 August. The Bank Holiday dawned over Cornwall as a lovely summer's day and a crowd of 20,000 was hoped for, but this being Bodmin Moor it was blanketed in fog. After sheep were cleared from the bank straight, the weather had improved sufficiently to allow the drivers to have their statutory three laps of practice. So Davidstow's first race commenced (as opposed to speed trails and relay races) over five laps for the first heat of the sports car race up to 1,500 cc. It was won by M.G. Llewellyn in an MG TD. After more fog related problems, Davidstow witnessed its first race for real racing cars – Formula Three over 20 laps. Two Kiefts won from two Coopers, Paulson and Westcott leading home Nurse and Piers. The winner's average speed was 71.53 mph, with the fastest lap being shared between three drivers at 73.9 mph.

The meeting on 1 August saw the return of Formula Three cars, this time in better weather. Their event was expanded on this occasion to be run as two heats and a final, and attracted some of the great names of the day. Don Parker won the first heat in his Kieft from Stuart Lewis-Evans (Cooper), with Les Leston (Leston Special) third and Ken Tyrrell (Cooper) fourth. Both heats were run over 10 laps, with the second being won by Eric Brandon (Cooper) from Don Truman (Cooper) second, third was N. Berrow Johnson (Martin Special) and fourth, A.A. Butler (Cooper). The final was over 20 laps, Brandon winning at 75.99 mph and equalling his lap record he set in the early heat, with Parker second from Lewis-Evans and Leston. The season had ended on a high note and there were hopes for a better 1954.

For 1954, two meetings were organised for Bank Holiday Mondays, with Permits of National Status, with the bonus that races would be run for Formula One, superseded 2-litre Formula Two and Formula Libre cars in addition to the usual sports cars and Formula Three.

The first meeting was held on 7 June, which dawned to high winds and driving rain. Despite this the promise of a Formula One race in Cornwall drew a crowd of 20,000 spectators. The Formula One race was the eighth race of the programme and was over 20 laps. There were only seven starters although, there was a true Formula One car amongst them, the majority of the entrants being runners in the early superseded 2-litre Formula Two race; John Riseley-Prichard (Connaught-Lea Francis Type A) won at a speed of 74.2 mph from Jack Walton (Cooper-Bristol) and Anthony Brooks (HWM-Alta), with another Cooper-Bristol fourth in the hands of Tom Kyffin. Later, the meeting was abandoned due to the bridge over the track collapsing.

The next meeting of 1954 also featured a Formula One race. This was scheduled for Bank Holiday Monday, 2 August. Once again the weather took a hand, as the circuit was blanketed in fog, which later turned to a penetrating drizzle. The fifth race of eight was billed as being for Formula One and superseded 2-litre Formula Two, but in truth like before, no Formula One car was in sight, and only seven cars came to the start (and some of them were sports cars). The race was planned for 30 laps but reduced to 20; John Coombs won in the Lea Francis engined Lotus Mk8 at 72.65 mph. The next three places were all taken by Cooper-Bristol's piloted by Tom Kyffin, Dick Gibson and Gordon Rolls. This was Lotus's first Formula One win; although the Mk8 was built as a sports car its engine capacity met the Formula One limit of 2.5 litres allowing it to compete as a Formula One car under the contemporary regulations. Their first win in a World Championship race using a recognised Formula One car was Stirling Moss's victory in Monaco 1960, driving the Rob Walker entered Lotus 18.

For the 1955 season the organisers decided to concentrate on just one race meeting and this was held on Whit Monday, 30 May. It was their intention that this race meeting would be the last at Davidstow, but so it was to be. However, the circuit bowed out a high note. At the very end real Formula One cars completed at Davidstow. There was much excitement when it became known that Peter Collins had entered a Maserati 250F and an Aston Martin DB3S, but with only three days to ago, learned he was also entered into a meeting at Crystal Palace. Three Connaughts and three Coopers formed up on the grid, among the notable entries was the Connaught B3 driven by Leslie Marr. This was the streamlined car, of which was one of only two streamlined cars to compete at this level. The other being the Mercedes-Benz W196. There were three other non-starters in addition to Collins; Tony Rolt's Connaught B4, entered by Rob Walker was not ready in time. Tyrrell decided not to run against the assembled company of Kyffin, Charles Boulton and Bob Harris in their Connaughts and Gibson and F. Sowery, both in Coopers. Rolls's Tojeiro-Bristol was present but was withdrawn prior to the race. Marr was in his element, winning comfortably at 85.84 mph from Boulton, Kyffin, and Gibson. Not surprisingly Marr set the fastest lap at 88.21 mph.

In the very last race to be held at Davidstow, a Formula Libre race, Marr left the outright lap record at a fraction less than 90 mph in the B3, officially stopped the watch at 1min 14sec, a speed of 89.88 mph.

So Davidstow ended as a motor racing circuit; it had a short career of three years.

== Today ==
There is an ultralight and microlight flying school at the airfield today.

== Results ==
Year	Date	Event	Winning driver	Winning constructor	Report
1954	7 June	Cornwall MRC Formula 1 Race	(United Kingdom) John Riseley-Prichard	Connaught-Lea Francis	Report
1954	2 August	Cornwall MRC Formula 1 Race	(United Kingdom) John Coombs	Lotus-Lea Francis	Report
1955	30 May	Cornwall MRC Formula 1 Race	(United Kingdom) Leslie Marr	Connaught-Alta	Report

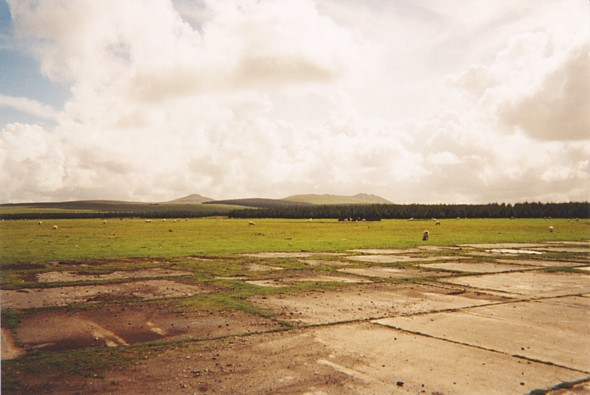
Davidstow Airfield
