= RAF Davidstow Moor =

Former Royal Air Force station in Cornwall, England

RAF Davidstow Moor
- Near Davidstow, Cornwall in England
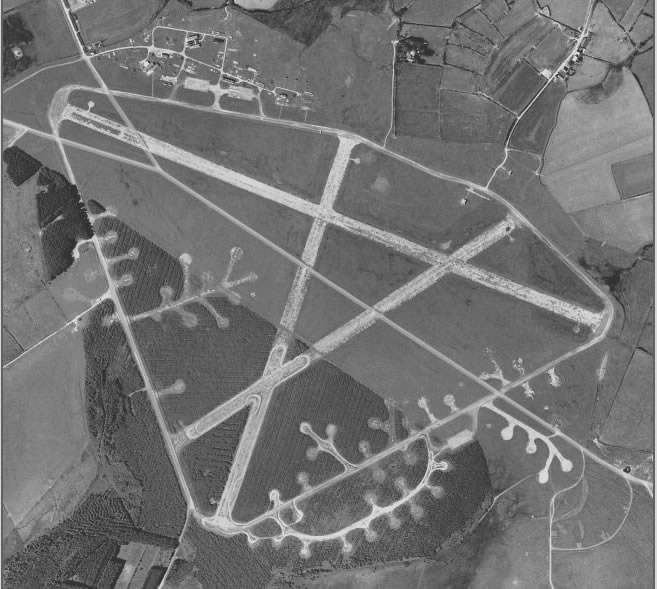
- RAF Davidstow Airfield – 2 June 1951

Site information
- Type: Royal Air Force station
- Owner: Air Ministry
- Operator: Royal Air Force 1943-44; United States Army Air Forces 1942
- Controlled by: RAF Coastal Command * No. 19 Group RAF

Location
- Shown within Cornwall
- Coordinates: 50°38′07″N 004°37′04″W

Site history
- Built: 1941/42
- In use: October 1942 - December 1945

Airfield information
- Elevation: 295 metres (968 ft) AMSL
Runways
Direction	Length and surface
06/24	1,290 metres (4,232 ft) Concrete
12/30	1,820 metres (5,971 ft) Concrete
18/36	1,280 metres (4,199 ft) Concrete

Royal Air Force Davidstow, or more simply RAF Davidstow Moor, is a former Royal Air Force station located 2.9 miles (4.7 km) north east of Camelford, Cornwall and 11.5 miles (18.5 km) west of Launceston, Cornwall, England.

It was used from late 1942 until 1945, and despite a few periods of intense activity it was one of Coastal Command's lesser used airfields.

== History ==
The land was acquired in 1941, and a three-runway airfield with extensive dispersal areas was constructed in the first half of 1942. Despite the moorland conditions, construction was reasonably straightforward, although it did involve the removal of various field boundaries, the closure of minor roads and some drainage work.

RAF Davidstow Moor closed in December 1945 at the end of World War II and many of the buildings, including the hangars were soon removed. It became a motor racing circuit, known as Davidstow Circuit and in the early 1950s, three Formula One races were held there (the Cornwall MRC Formula 1 Races) including the first success for the Lotus marque.

=== Posted units ===
Squadron	Dates stationed	Planes used	Duties
53 Sqn	1 January 1943 – 18 February 1943	Lockheed Hudson	
144 Sqn	10 May 1944 – 1 July 1944	Bristol Beaufighter	Covered the west flank of the Normandy landings. Helped to destroy the German naval forces in Western France
192 Sqn			
206 Sqn	18 March 1944 – 12 April 1944	Consolidated Liberator, Boeing Fortress	
269 Sqn	8 January 1944 – 8 March 1944	Lockheed Hudson, Supermarine Walrus	Air-sea rescue duties
280 Sqn			
281 Sqn det	December 1943 – February 1945	Vickers Warwick	Air sea rescue duties
282 Sqn	1 February 1944 – 19 September 1944	Vickers Warwick	Air sea rescue duties
304 Sqn	7 June 1943 – 13 December 1943	Vickers Wellington	Anti-submarine patrols over the Bay of Biscay
404 Sqn RCAF	8 May 1944 – September 1944	Bristol Beaufighter	
524 Sqn	7 April 1944 – 1 July 1944	Vickers Wellington	Patrols against E-Boats off the French coast
547 Sqn	31 May 1943 – 25 October 1943	Vickers Wellington	Anti-submarine patrols over the Bay of Biscay
612 (County of Aberdeen) Sqn AAF	12 April 1943 – 25 May 1943	Vickers Wellington	Anti-submarine patrols over the Channel and the Bay of Biscay
845 Naval Air Squadron			
1603 (AAC) Flt	16 December 1942 – 27 January 1943	Hawker Henley	Target towing

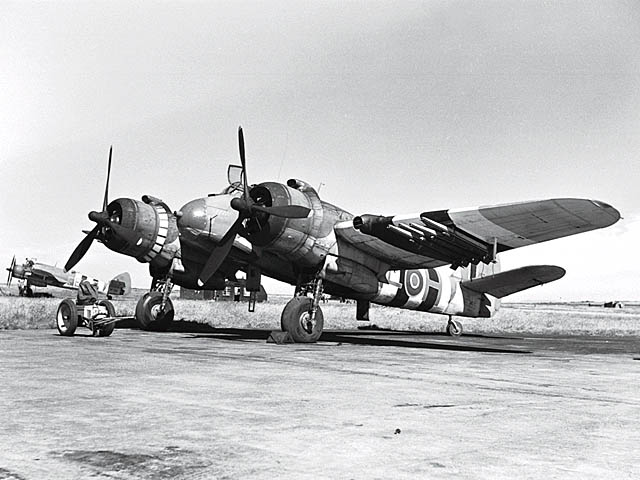
Bristol Beaufighter Mk X. This machine is NE255/EE-H of No. 404 Squadron RCAF at RAF Davidstow Moor on 21 August 1944

A number of RAF Regiment units were also posted here at some point:

Wings;

- 1329, 1330 & 1331

Squadrons;

- 2708, 2731, 2738, 2743, 2748, 2776, 2778, 2786, 2792, 2793, 2796, 2802, 2810, 2886, 2889, 2954 & 2955

== Current use ==
The disused former watch office/air traffic control tower is clearly visible on the airfield.

The airfield is still partly used by microlights and motor gliders with three runways in use. The runway lengths and directions are: 02–20, 395m, 06–24, 489m, 12–30, 1,450m. PPR (prior permission required) is essential for this site. It is currently run by Davidstow Flying Club.

=== Davidstow Airfield and Cornwall at War Museum ===
The Davidstow Airfield and Cornwall at War Museum has been set up to commemorate the work and people of RAF Davidstow Moor.

It is located next to a creamery where Davidstow and Cathedral City cheeses are produced. Many exhibits cover life in the Second World War in Cornwall, including other airfields along the North Cornwall coast, the Royal Navy, Army and civilian services, and life on the home front. Other exhibits include artifacts from the Royal Observer Corps and the Light Infantry, vehicles and weapons. A new hangar was completed in 2016 and now houses a growing collection of larger exhibits including a Fairey Gannet and Hawker Hunter F.6 aircraft, the cockpit section of a de Havilland Vampire T.11 as well as a number of rare airfield and military vehicles.

=== Davidstow Moor RAF Memorial Museum ===
The adjacent yet separate Davidstow Moor RAF Memorial Museum is located in the former sergeants' shower block and focuses on the airfield's history during the Second World War using archive photographs and memorabilia.

=== Unauthorised festival ===
An unauthorised open-air music and dance event was held on the site in June 2022.

== See also ==
- List of former Royal Air Force stations
