= 1954 II Cornwall MRC Formula 1 Race =

1954 (II) Cornwall MRC Formula 1 Race
- Non-championship race in the 1954 Formula One season
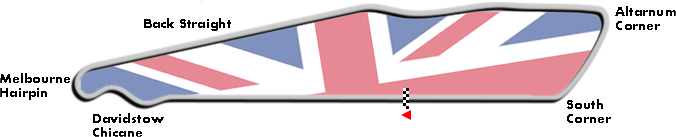

Race details
- Date: 2 August 1954
- Official name: II Cornwall MRC Formula 1 Race
- Location: Davidstow Circuit, Davidstow, Cornwall
- Course: Permanent racing facility
- Course length: 2.973 km (1.8475 miles)
- Distance: 20 (reduced from 30) laps, 59.46 km (36.95 miles)
- Weather: Wet

Pole position
Driver	(United Kingdom) Rodney Nuckey	Cooper-Bristol

Fastest lap
Drivers	(United Kingdom) Rodney Nuckey	Cooper-Bristol
	(United Kingdom) John Coombs	Lotus-Lea Francis
- Time: 1:29.0

Podium
First	(United Kingdom) John Coombs	Lotus-Lea Francis
Second	(United Kingdom) Tom Kyffin	Cooper-Bristol
Third	(United Kingdom) Dick Gibson	Cooper-Bristol

The 2nd Cornwall MRC Formula 1 Race was a motor race, run to Formula One rules, held on 2 August 1954 at the Davidstow Circuit, Cornwall. The race was to be run over 30 laps of the little circuit, but this was reduced to 20 laps due to the bad weather. The race was won by British driver John Coombs in a Lotus Mk VIII.

This was the second of three Formula One races held in Cornwall during 1954 and 1955, and the first Formula One race to be won by a Lotus.

Rodney Nuckey led the race until lap 17, when he suffered oil pressure problems, leaving Coombs and Tom Kyffin to battle for the lead until the end.

== Results ==
Pos	Driver	Entrant	Constructor	Time/Retired	Grid
1	(United Kingdom) John Coombs	J. Coombs	Lotus-Lea Francis		6
2	(United Kingdom) Tom Kyffin	Equipe Devone	Cooper-Bristol		2
3	(United Kingdom) Dick Gibson	R. Gibson	Cooper-Bristol		3
4	(United Kingdom) Gordon Rolls	Equipe Devone	Cooper-Bristol	19 laps	4
Ret	(United Kingdom) Rodney Nuckey	Eric Brandon	Cooper-Bristol	Oil pressure	1
Ret	(United Kingdom) Albert Wake	A. Wake	Alta-Bristol		5
DNS	(United Kingdom) Jack Walton	J.H. Walton	Cooper-Bristol		–
DNS	(United Kingdom) Peter Bolton	J.H. Walton	Frazer Nash-BMW		–
DNS	(United Kingdom) Eric Brandon	E. Brandon	Cooper-Aston Martin	Engine in practice	–

- Brandon's Cooper-Aston Martin blew its engine in practice, and a Bristol engine was installed in its place. This car was the Cooper-Bristol that Nuckey used during the race.

Previous race: 1954 August Cup	Formula One non-championship races 1954 season	Next race: 1954 International Gold Cup
Previous race: 1954 I Cornwall MRC Formula 1 Race	Cornwall MRC Formula 1 Race	Next race: 1955 Cornwall MRC Formula 1 Race
