= Don Beauman =

British racing driver (1928–1955)

- Born: 26 July 1928; Farnborough, Hampshire, England
- Died: 9 July 1955 (aged 26); Rathnew, County Wicklow, Ireland

Formula One World Championship career
- Nationality: (United Kingdom) British
- Active years: 1954
- Team: privateer Connaught
- Entries: 1
- Championships: 0
- Wins: 0
- Podiums: 0
- Career points: 0
- Pole positions: 0
- Fastest laps: 0
- First entry: 1954 British Grand Prix

Donald Bentley Beauman (26 July 1928 – 9 July 1955) was a British racing driver who took part in one Formula One World Championship Grand Prix.

Beauman was born in Farnborough, Hampshire, the only son of Brigadier Archibald Bentley Beauman. He had a career as a hotelier but began motor racing in 1950.

Beauman ran a Cooper 500 for two years in Formula Three before switching to sports car racing, and took on Formula One in 1954 with a Connaught A-Type, sponsored by wealthy privateer Sir Jeremy Boles. He finished eleventh in the British Grand Prix at Silverstone. He achieved some success in Formula Two, with several third and fourth-place finishes and a second place in the Madgwick Cup at Goodwood. In 1955, the weekend before the British Grand Prix, he was killed when he crashed his Connaught during the Leinster Trophy race in Wicklow. He had set the fastest time of 82.94 mph (133.45 km/h) on his first lap but crashed near the Beehive pub on his second and was killed instantly. Beauman's death plus other fatal racing accidents that year brought an end to motor car racing at the Curragh.

== Complete Formula One results ==
(key)

Year	Entrant	Chassis	Engine	1	2	3	4	5	6	7	8	9	WDC	Points
1954	Sir Jeremy Boles	Connaught A Type	Lea-Francis Straight-4	ARG	500	BEL	FRA	GBR; 11	GER	SUI	ITA	ESP	NC	0
