= 1954 I Cornwall MRC Formula 1 Race =

1954 (I) Cornwall MRC Formula 1 Race
- Non-championship race in the 1954 Formula One season
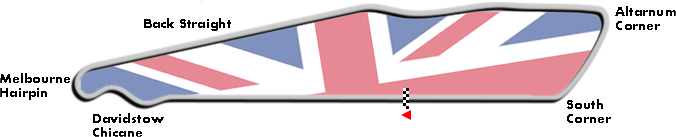

Race details
- Date: 7 June 1954
- Official name: I Cornwall MRC Formula 1 Race
- Location: Davidstow Circuit, Davidstow, Cornwall
- Course: Permanent racing facility
- Course length: 2.973 km (1.8475 miles)
- Distance: 20 laps, 59.46 km (36.95 miles)
- Weather: Wet

Pole position
Driver	(United Kingdom) John Riseley-Prichard	Connaught-Lea Francis

Fastest lap
Driver	(United Kingdom) John Riseley-Prichard	Connaught-Lea Francis
- Time: 1:27.7

Podium
First	(United Kingdom) John Riseley-Prichard	Connaught-Lea Francis
Second	(United Kingdom) Jack Walton	Cooper-Bristol
Third	(United Kingdom) Anthony Brooke	HWM-Alta

The 1st Cornwall MRC Formula 1 Race was the first Cornwall MRC motor race, run to Formula One rules, held on 7 June 1954 at the Davidstow Circuit, Cornwall. The race was run over 20 laps of the little circuit, and was won by British driver John Riseley-Prichard in a Connaught Type A.

This was the first of three Formula One races held in Cornwall during 1954 and 1955, and was the first Formula One event to include a Kieft on the grid, driven by Horace Gould.

Gould later caused the entire meeting to be ended prematurely when he crashed his car transporter (a converted double-decker bus) into a footbridge, bringing it down on to the track.

== Results ==
Pos	Driver	Entrant	Constructor	Time/Retired	Grid
1	(United Kingdom) John Riseley-Prichard	J. Riseley-Prichard	Connaught-Lea Francis	29:54.9	1
2	(United Kingdom) Jack Walton	J.H. Walton	Cooper-Bristol		4
3	(United Kingdom) Anthony Brooke	A. Brooke	HWM-Alta		7
4	(United Kingdom) Tom Kyffin	Equipe Devone	Cooper-Bristol		6
Ret	(United Kingdom) Charles Boulton	C.D. Boulton	Connaught-Lea Francis		5
Ret	(United Kingdom) Horace Gould	H.H. Gould	Kieft-Bristol	Engine	3
Ret	(United Kingdom) Leslie Marr	L. Marr	Connaught-Lea Francis	Accident	2
DNA	(United Kingdom) R. E. Dixon	J.H. Walton	Frazer Nash-BMW		–
DNA	(United Kingdom) Dick Gibson	R. Gibson	Cooper-Bristol		–
DNA	(United Kingdom) David Watts	Equipe Devone	Cooper-Bristol		–

Previous race: 1954 BARC Formula 1 Race / 1954 Grand Prix des Frontières	Formula One non-championship races 1954 season	Next race: 1954 Grand Prix des Frontières / 1954 Crystal Palace Trophy
Previous race: —	Cornwall MRC Formula 1 Race	Next race: 1954 II Cornwall MRC Formula 1 Race
