= 1954 Berlin Grand Prix =

- Non-championship race in the 1954 Formula One season

Race details
- Date: 19 September 1954
- Official name: I Großer Preis von Berlin
- Location: Berlin, Germany
- Course: AVUS
- Course length: 8.300 km (5.157 miles)
- Distance: 60 laps, 498.00 km (309.42 miles)

Pole position
Driver	(Argentina) Juan Manuel Fangio	Mercedes-Benz
- Time: 2:12.3

Fastest lap
Driver	(Argentina) Juan Manuel Fangio	Mercedes-Benz
- Time: 2:13.4

Podium
First	(Germany) Karl Kling	Mercedes-Benz
Second	(Argentina) Juan Manuel Fangio	Mercedes-Benz
Third	(Germany) Hans Herrmann	Mercedes-Benz

The 1st Großer Preis von Berlin was a non-championship Formula One motor race held on 19 September 1954 at the AVUS circuit in Berlin. The Grand Prix was won by Karl Kling in a Mercedes-Benz W196. Kling's team-mates Juan Manuel Fangio and Hans Herrmann were second and third, with Fangio setting pole position and fastest lap.

This was Mercedes' only participation in a non-championship Formula 1 race, the team wanting to demonstrate their cars to their home nation, especially on a track that would suit them. As such it was a processional race, with less than a second separating the three cars, and fourth placed André Pilette coming in 3 laps behind in his Gordini T16.

== Classification ==
=== Race ===
Pos	No	Driver	Entrant	Car	Time/Retired	Grid
1	4	(Germany) Karl Kling	Daimler Benz AG	Mercedes-Benz W196	2:19:59.8, 212.79kph	3
2	2	(Argentina) Juan Manuel Fangio	Daimler Benz AG	Mercedes-Benz W196	+0.5s	1
3	6	(Germany) Hans Herrmann	Daimler Benz AG	Mercedes-Benz W196	+0.9s	2
4	17	(Belgium) André Pilette	Equipe Gordini	Gordini T16	+3 laps	7
5	18	(Belgium) Jacques Swaters	Ecurie Francorchamps	Ferrari 500	+4 laps	5
6	16	(United States) Fred Wacker	Equipe Gordini	Gordini T16	+5 laps	9
7	24	(Germany) Helmut Niedermayr	Hans Klenk	Klenk Meteor-BMW	+8 laps, steering	10
8	22	(United States) Harry Schell	Harry Schell	Maserati A6GCM	+10 laps	11
Ret	14	(France) Jean Behra	Equipe Gordini	Gordini T16	14 laps, engine	4
Ret	20	(France) Louis Rosier	Equipe Rosier	Maserati 250F	0 laps, driveshaft	6
DNA	8	(United Kingdom) Stirling Moss	Officine Alfieri Maserati	Maserati 250F	car not repaired	-
DNA	10	(Italy) Sergio Mantovani	Officine Alfieri Maserati	Maserati 250F	car not repaired	-
DNA	26	(Germany) Rudolf Krause	Dora Greifzu	Eigenbau-BMW		-

Previous race: 1954 Circuit de Cadours	Formula One non-championship races 1954 season	Next race: 1954 Goodwood Trophy
Previous race: —	Großer Preis von Berlin	Next race: 1955 Berlin Grand Prix
