= 1954 BARC Formula 1 Race =

- Non-championship race in the 1954 Formula One season

Race details
- Date: 7 June 1954
- Official name: I BARC Formula 1 Race
- Location: Goodwood Circuit, West Sussex
- Course: Permanent racing facility
- Course length: 3.809 km (2.367 miles)
- Distance: 5 laps, 18.983 km (11.835 miles)

Pole position
Driver	(United Kingdom) Gerry Dunham	DHS-Rover
- Grid positions set by ballot

Fastest lap
Driver	(United Kingdom) Roy Salvadori	Maserati
- Time: 1:35.0

Podium
First	(United Kingdom) Reg Parnell	Ferrari
Second	(United Kingdom) Roy Salvadori	Maserati
Third	(United Kingdom) Jimmy Somervail	Cooper-Bristol

The 1st BARC Formula 1 Race was a motor race, run to Formula One rules, held on 7 June 1954 as part of the Whitsun Trophy meeting at Goodwood Circuit, West Sussex. The race was run over 5 laps of the circuit and lasted just over 8 minutes, making it one of the shortest scheduled Formula 1 races ever run. It was won by British driver Reg Parnell in a Ferrari 625. Roy Salvadori in a Maserati 250F and Jimmy Somervail in a Cooper T20-Bristol were second and third, with Salvadori setting fastest lap.

== Results ==
Pos	No.	Driver	Entrant	Constructor	Time/Retired
1	5	(United Kingdom) Reg Parnell	Scuderia Ambrosiana	Ferrari 625	8:12.3, 87.60 mph
2	10	(United Kingdom) Roy Salvadori	Gilby Engineering	Maserati 250F	+1.5s
3	7	(United Kingdom) Jimmy Somervail	Border Reivers	Cooper T20-Bristol	+26.5s
4	6	(United Kingdom) Jock Lawrence	Ecurie Ecosse	Cooper T20-Bristol	+49.1s
5	11	(United Kingdom) Michael Young	Michael Young	Connaught Type A-Lea Francis	5 laps
6	18	(United Kingdom) Gerry Dunham	C.G.H. Dunham	DHS-Rover	5 laps
7	82	(United Kingdom) Paul Emery	Emeryson Cars	Emeryson Mk.1-Alta	5 laps
8	15	(United Kingdom) John Webb	John Webb	Turner-Lea Francis	
9	14	(United Kingdom) Ted Whiteaway	E.N. Whiteaway	HWM-Alta	
Ret	21	(United Kingdom) Les Leston	Les Leston	Cooper-JAP	
DNA	9	(United Kingdom) Albert Wake	Albert Wake	Alta F2-Bristol	
DNA	12	(United Kingdom) Leslie Brooke	H.L. Brooke	Connaught Type A-Lea Francis	
DNA	16	(United Kingdom) Eric Brandon	Ecurie Richmond	Cooper T23-Alta	
DNA	17	(United Kingdom) Rodney Nuckey	Ecurie Richmond	Cooper T23-Bristol	

Previous race: 1954 Grand Prix des Frontières	Formula One non-championship races 1954 season	Next race: 1954 I Cornwall MRC Formula 1 Race
Previous race: —	BARC Formula 1 Race	Next race: —
