= John Coombs =

British racing driver

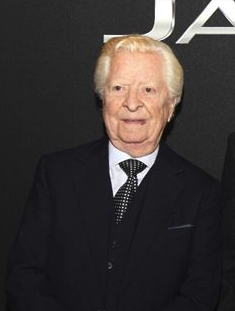
- Coombs in 2012
- Nationality: (United Kingdom) British
- Born: 1 February 1922 Chertsey, Surrey
- Died: 3 August 2013 (aged 91) Monaco
- Years active: 1949–c. 1955

John Coombs (1 February 1922 – 3 August 2013) was a British racing driver and racing team owner. After a driving career in various formulae, including a win in a minor Formula One race, he became a team owner in sports car racing and Formula Two. During the 1960s and 1970s, working closely with Tyrrell Racing, he ran cars for several top drivers of the time, including Jackie Stewart, Graham Hill and Jack Brabham.

== Driving career ==
The owner of a Jaguar dealership in Guildford, Coombs began racing in 1949 with a Cooper, fitted with an engine from a Rover 10. He graduated to Formula Three and campaigned a JBS in 1951, and later a Cooper-Norton and a British-built Erskine Staride. He finished on the podium on several occasions, and won two races in 1952 with the Cooper – at Thruxton and in the Commander Yorke Trophy at Silverstone, beating Bob Gerard. He also achieved the lap record at Fairwood Circuit, which still stands as the circuit was redeveloped into Swansea Airport in the late 1950s. He won at Thruxton again in 1953 in the Staride.

Also in 1953, Coombs earned a test at Snetterton with the Connaught Engineering factory team, alongside Roy Salvadori, Jack Fairman and Ian Stewart. Salvadori was fastest with Coombs second, and Coombs was subsequently entered into a number of Formula Two races both in the UK and abroad. In 1954, he bought a 1.5 litre Connaught and soon replaced it with a Lotus Mark VIII, retaining the Connaught engine. With this car he achieved a number of second place finishes, and won the Cornwall MRC Formula 1 Race at Davidstow Circuit on 2 August 1954, marking the first victory for a Lotus in a Formula One race, although the Mark VIII was not a Formula One car.

He progressed to a Cooper-Bristol and a Lotus Eleven, but found that his business commitments were compromising his driving career. He therefore decided to give up driving and concentrate on preparing cars for other drivers.

== Team ownership ==
=== Sports cars ===
Coombs began by running a Lotus 15 in sports car racing for Ron Flockhart and Roy Salvadori with some success, before switching to a pair of Cooper Monacos, his drivers including Jack Brabham and Bruce McLaren. With the backing of his car dealership contacts, Coombs also ran Jaguar Mark 1s for Flockhart, Duncan Hamilton and occasionally other drivers such as Walt Hansgen. When they became available, he also prepared Mark 2s to a high specification, one of which was raced by Colin Chapman, who subsequently bought one.

In 1961 Coombs used the new Jaguar E-Type, and by the following year, Graham Hill had joined his list of drivers. He also bought a Ferrari 250 GTO and lent it to Jaguar at the end of 1962 to help them prepare a new lightweight E-Type, which found success with Hill at the wheel. Coombs' team was by now racing Jaguar saloons, the E-Types, two Ferrari GTOs and an Aston Martin DB4 GT Zagato. Mike Parkes, Jack Sears and Jackie Stewart had joined as drivers, although Salvadori had left.

=== Formula Two ===
In 1964, Coombs expanded his operation to include Formula Two, running a Cooper-Cosworth for Graham Hill. Switching to a Brabham-BRM, Hill beat Jim Clark at Snetterton and achieved a number of podium finishes. After Hill left the team to join Lotus in 1967, Coombs hired Piers Courage who drove a McLaren M4A. For 1968, and with support from Ken Tyrrell, Coombs prepared Matras for Stewart and Johnny Servoz-Gavin, the latter winning the 1969 European Formula Two Championship. Coombs switched back to a Brabham in 1970, for Stewart and Jack Brabham himself. During the 1970s, several up and coming drivers raced for Coombs, including Patrick Depailler and François Cevert.

== Later life ==
During the 1980s, Coombs scaled down his racing operations, and switched his car dealership from Jaguar to BMW. Eventually becoming dissatisfied with BMW, he sold his dealership and retired to Monaco, although he retained a workshop in Guildford. He continued his interest in racing cars, preparing historic cars for use at the Goodwood Revival until shortly before his death in a Monaco hospital, aged 91.
