= 1952 12 Hours of Sebring =

Sports car endurance race

The Sebring International Grand Prix of Endurance, was a non-championship race. The race was held at the Sebring International Raceway, on March 15, 1952. Victory overall went to the No. 9 J. S. Donaldson Frazer Nash Le Mans Replica driven by Larry Kulok and Harry Grey.

== Race results ==
Class winners in bold.

Pos	Class	No	Team	Drivers	Car	Laps
1	**S2.0**	**9**	**(United States) J. S. Donaldson**	**(United States) Larry Kulok (United States) Harry Grey**	**Frazer Nash Le Mans Replica**	**145**
2	**S5.0**	**23**	**(United States) C. M. Schott**	**(United States) Charles Schott (United States) Morris Carroll**	**Jaguar XK120**	**140**
3	**S1.5**	**1**	**(United States) R. H. Irish**	**(United States) Dick Irish (United States) Robert Fergus**	**Siata 1400 Gran Sport**	**139**
4	S2.0	57	(United States) Bob O'Brien	(United States) Robert O'Brien (United States) Richard Cicurel	Ferrari 166 MM Berlinetta Le Mans	138
5	S5.0	89	(United States) Jack Pry Motors	(United States) Charles Wallace (United States) Dickson Yates	Jaguar XK120	138
6	S1.5	4	(United States) David H. Ash	(United States) David Ash (United States) John van Driel	MG TD Mk II Special	133
7	**S750**	**25**	**(France) Automobiles D. B.**	**(United States) Steve Lansing (United States) Wade Morehouse (France) René Bonnet**	**DB**	**130**
8	S1.5	2	(United States) R. K. Thompson Jr.	(United States) Dick Thompson (United States) William Kinchloe	MG TD Mk II Special	129
9	**S3.0**	**7**	**(United States) S. F. Wilder**	**(United States) Gus Ehrman (United States) Steve Wilder**	**Morgan +4**	**128**
10	S1.5	52	(United States) F. R. Pearsall	(United States) Walt Hansgen (United States) Randy Pearsall	MG TD	128
11	S1.5	10	(United States) H. L. Brundage	(United States) Hubert L. Brundage (United States) Ira Stacy Brundage	VW Special Aero Roadster	128
12	S1.5	5	(United States) Fred F. Allen	(United States) Frank O'Hare (United States) Fred Allen	MG TD Mk II	125
13	S750	24	(France) Automobiles D. B.	(France) René Bonnet (United States) Bill Cook	DB	99
14	S750	40	(United States) G. F. Schrafft	(United States) George Schrafft (United States) David Viall	Crosley Le Mans	94
15	**S1.1**	**26**	**(United States) John Gifford Motors**	**(United States) Roger Wing (United States) Stephen Spitler**	**Morris Minor**	**75**
16	S750	50	(United States) G. Sanderson	(United States) George Sanderson	Crosley HotShot	72
17	S5.0	13	(United States) F. N. Dagavar	(United States) Johnnie Rogers (United States) Fred Dagavar	Jaguar XK120	64
18 DNF	S1.1	47	(United States) Paul Ceresole	(United States) John Greenwood (United States) Paul Ceresole	Cisitalia 202 SMM Spider Nuvolari	105
19 DNF	S5.0	11	(United States) R. S. Grier	(United States) Robert Grier (United States) Myke Collins	Allard J2	73
20 DNF	S1.5	39	(United States) Speed Craft Enterprises	(United States) Otto Linton (United States) Thomas Scatchard	Siata	67
21 DNF	S1.5	34	(United States) N. K. Patton Jr.	(United States) Norm Patton (United States) Bruce Bailey	MG TD	63
22 DNF	S1.1	51	(United States) C. R. Hasson	(United States) Beau Clarke (United States) Charles Hassan	Bandini S 750	55
23 DNF	S5.0	8	(United States) W. C. Spear	(United States) Bill Spear (United States) Briggs Cunningham	Ferrari 340 America	51
24 DNF	S3.0	12	(United States) Paul Ramos	(United States) Paul Ramos (United States) Tony Cummings	MG TC	43
25 DNF	S5.0	45	(United States) Robert O'Brien	(United States) Gary McDonald (United States) Bob Kennedy	Jaguar XK120	37
26 DNF	S1.1	22	(United States) B. S. Cunningham	(United States) George Huntoon (United States) Phil Stiles	Siata 300BC	31
27 DNF	S3.0	38	(United States) D. Hirsch	(United States) David Hirsch (United States) Bob Gegen	Aston Martin DB2	29
28 DNF	S2.0	28	(United States) J. Simpson Jr.	(United States) James Simpson (United States) George Colby	Ferrari 166 MM Berlinetta Le Mans	26
29 DNF	S1.5	29	(United States) J. Keeley	(United States) James Keeley (United States) Jack Norcross	MG TC	20
30 DNF	S1.5	18	(United States) R. E. Belfield	(United States) Robert Belfield (United States) A. Tarpanian (United States) Joseph Ferguson	Siata Daina	14
31 DNF	S1.5	43	(United States) W. A. Rauch	(United States) Chuck Sarle (United States) William Rauch	MG TD	4
32 DNF	S5.0	54	(United States) Al Scully	(United States) Rex Easton (United States) Al Scully	Mercury	1
33 DNF	S1.5	16	(United States) Joe F. Ferguson	(United States) Joseph Ferguson	Siata Daina Berlinetta	?
