= List of Formula One constructor records =

The World Constructors' Championship has been held since 1958. Constructor records listed here include all rounds which formed part of the World Championship since 1950: this includes the Indianapolis 500 from 1950 to 1960 (although it was not run to Formula One rules), and the 1952 and 1953 World Championship Grands Prix (which were run to Formula Two rules). Formula One races that were not qualification rounds for the World Championship are not included, and sprints are only included when specified.

== Races entered and started ==
Constructors are considered to be entered into a race if they attempt to compete in at least one official practice session with the intent of participating in the race. These constructors are noted on the entry list for that race. A constructor is considered to have started a race if at least one of their drivers line up on the grid or at the pit lane exit for the start of the race. If a race is stopped and restarted, participation in any portion of the race is counted only if that portion was in any way counted towards the final classification (e.g. races stopped before the end of the leader's second lap were declared null and void prior to 2005).

=== Total races started ===
	Constructor	Entries	Starts	Seasons
1	(Italy) **Ferrari**	1145	1143	1950–2026
2	(United Kingdom) **McLaren**	1019	1014	1966–2026
3	(United Kingdom) **Williams**	872	871	1978–2026
4	(Switzerland) / (Germany) Sauber/BMW Sauber (Note: Sauber held a Swiss licence from 1993–2005, 2010–2018 and from 2024–2025 (in 2010 as BMW Sauber and from 2024–2025 as Kick Sauber), and a German licence (as BMW Sauber) from 2006–2009.)	513	510	1993–2018, 2024–2025
5	(United Kingdom) Lotus	491	489	1958–1994
6	(United Kingdom) / (Austria) **Red Bull Racing** (Note: Red Bull held a British licence from 2005 to 2006, and an Austrian licence from 2007 onwards)	439	438	2005–2026
7	(United Kingdom) Tyrrell	433	430	1970–1998
8	(France) / (United Kingdom) Renault (Note: Renault held a French licence from 1977–1985, 2002–2010 and 2016–2020, and a British licence in 2011.)	403	400	1977–1985, 2002–2011,2016–2020
9	(United Kingdom) Brabham	403	394	1962–1987, 1989–1992
10	(United Kingdom) Arrows	394	382	1978–2002

Notes

- Source combines Williams FW of 1975 and Wolf–Williams Racing of 1976 with Williams
- Source separates Sauber, BMW Sauber and Kick Sauber statistics.
- Source unites Lotus, Team Lotus and Lotus F1 statistics.
- Source separates Arrows and Footwork Arrows statistics.

=== Most races with a single engine manufacturer ===
	Constructor	Engine	Seasons	Starts
1	(Italy) **Ferrari**	Ferrari	1950–2026 (ongoing)	1143
2	(United Kingdom) **McLaren**	Mercedes	1995–2014, 2021–2026 (ongoing)	485
3	(France) / (United Kingdom) Renault	Renault	1977–1985, 2002–2011,2016–2020	400
4	(Germany) **Mercedes**	Mercedes	1954–1955, 2010–2026 (ongoing)	362
5	(United Kingdom) Tyrrell	Ford Cosworth	1970–1985, 1987–1990, 1997–1998	310
6	(United Kingdom) **Williams**	Mercedes	2014–2026 (ongoing)	273
7	(United Kingdom) Lotus	Ford Cosworth	1963, 1965–1983, 1992–1993	238
8	(United Kingdom) **McLaren**	Ford Cosworth	1968–1983, 1993	236
9	(United States) **Haas**	Ferrari	2016–2026 (ongoing)	235
10	(United Kingdom) BRM	BRM	1958–1960, 1962–1974	189

Notes

- Source unites Lotus, Team Lotus and Lotus F1 statistics.
- Source unites Force India and Racing Point Force India statistics.

== 1–2 finishes ==
=== Total 1–2 finishes ===
	Constructor	Seasons	Races	1–2s	Percentage
1	(Italy) **Ferrari**	1950–2026	1143	87	7.61%
2	(Germany) **Mercedes**	1954–1955, 2010–2026	362	63	17.40%
3	(United Kingdom) **McLaren**	1966–2026	1014	56	5.52%
4	(United Kingdom) **Williams**	1978–2026	871	33	3.79%
5	(United Kingdom) / (Austria) **Red Bull Racing**	2005–2026	438	31	7.08%
6	(United Kingdom) Lotus	1958–1994	489	8	1.64%
6	(United Kingdom) Brabham	1962–1987, 1989–1992	394	8	2.03%
6	(United Kingdom) Tyrrell	1970–1998	430	8	1.86%
9	(United Kingdom) Cooper	1950–1969	129	6	4.65%
10	(United Kingdom) BRM	1951–1977	197	5	2.54%

Notes

- Source unites Lotus, Team Lotus and Lotus F1 statistics.

=== Most 1–2 finishes in a season ===
	Constructor	Season	Races	1–2s	Percentage
1	(Germany) **Mercedes**	2015	19	12	63.16%
2	(Germany) **Mercedes**	2014	19	11	57.89%
3	(United Kingdom) **McLaren**	1988	16	10	62.50%
4	(Italy) **Ferrari**	2002	17	9	52.94%
4	(Germany) **Mercedes**	2019	21	9	42.86%
6	(Italy) **Ferrari**	2004	18	8	44.44%
6	(Germany) **Mercedes**	2016	21	8	38.10%
8	(United Kingdom) **McLaren**	2025	24	7	29.17%
9	(Italy) **Ferrari**	1952	8	6	75.00%
9	(United Kingdom) **Williams**	1992	16	6	37.50%
9	(United Kingdom) **Williams**	1996	16	6	37.50%
9	(Austria) **Red Bull Racing**	2023	22	6	27.27%

=== Most consecutive 1–2 finishes ===
	Constructor	Season(s)	1–2s	Races
1	(Italy) **Ferrari**	1952	5	1952 Belgian Grand Prix – 1952 Dutch Grand Prix
1	(Italy) **Ferrari**	2002	5	2002 Hungarian Grand Prix – 2002 Japanese Grand Prix
1	(Germany) **Mercedes**	2014	5	2014 Malaysian Grand Prix – 2014 Monaco Grand Prix
1	(Germany) **Mercedes**	2015–2016	5	2015 United States Grand Prix – 2016 Australian Grand Prix
1	(Germany) **Mercedes**	2019	5	2019 Australian Grand Prix – 2019 Spanish Grand Prix
6	(Germany) **Mercedes**	1955	4	1955 Belgian Grand Prix – 1955 Italian Grand Prix
6	(Germany) **Mercedes**	2014	4	2014 Japanese Grand Prix – 2014 Brazilian Grand Prix
6	(Germany) **Mercedes**	2016	4	2016 United States Grand Prix – 2016 Abu Dhabi Grand Prix
6	(United Kingdom) **Williams**	1980–1981	4	1980 Canadian Grand Prix – 1981 Brazilian Grand Prix
6	(United Kingdom) **McLaren**	1988	4	1988 Mexican Grand Prix – 1988 French Grand Prix
6	(United Kingdom) **McLaren**	2025	4	2025 Austrian Grand Prix – 2025 Hungarian Grand Prix

== Wins ==
=== Total wins ===
	Constructor	Seasons	Starts	Wins	Percentage
1	(Italy) **Ferrari**	1950–2026	1143	250	21.87%
2	(United Kingdom) **McLaren**	1966–2026	1014	206	20.32%
3	(Germany) **Mercedes**	1954–1955, 2010–2026	362	143	39.50%
4	(United Kingdom) / (Austria) **Red Bull Racing**	2005–2026	438	134	30.59%
5	(United Kingdom) **Williams**	1978–2026	871	114	13.09%
6	(United Kingdom) Lotus	1958–1994	489	79	16.16%
7	(United Kingdom) Brabham	1962–1987, 1989–1992	394	35	8.88%
7	(France) / (United Kingdom) Renault	1977–1985, 2002–2011, 2016–2020	400	35	8.75%
9	(United Kingdom) / (Italy) Benetton (Note: Benetton held a British licence from 1986 to 1995, and an Italian licence from 1996 to 2001)	1986–2001	260	27	10.38%
10	(United Kingdom) Tyrrell	1970–1998	430	23	5.35%

Notes

- Source unites Lotus, Team Lotus and Lotus F1 statistics.

=== Percentage wins ===
	Constructor	Races	Wins	Percentage
1	(United Kingdom) Brawn	17	8	47.06%
2	(Germany) **Mercedes**	362	143	39.50%
3	(United Kingdom) Vanwall	28	9	32.14%
4	(United Kingdom) / (Austria) **Red Bull Racing**	438	134	30.59%
5	(Italy) **Ferrari**	1143	250	21.87%
6	(United Kingdom) **McLaren**	1014	206	20.32%
7	(United Kingdom) Lotus	489	79	16.16%
8	(France) Matra	61	9	14.75%
9	(United Kingdom) **Williams**	871	114	13.09%
10	(United Kingdom) Cooper	129	16	12.40%

Notes

- Source includes Kurtis Kraft, Epperly and Watson in the top 10, but the Indianapolis 500 did not count towards the International Cup for F1 Manufacturers.
- Source unites Lotus, Team Lotus and Lotus F1 statistics.

=== Most wins in a season ===
	Constructor	Season	Races	Wins	Percentage
1	(Austria) **Red Bull Racing**	2023	22	21	95.45%
2	(Germany) **Mercedes**	2016	21	19	90.48%
3	(Austria) **Red Bull Racing**	2022	22	17	77.27%
4	(Germany) **Mercedes**	2014	19	16	84.21%
4	(Germany) **Mercedes**	2015	19	16	84.21%
6	(United Kingdom) **McLaren**	1988	16	15	93.75%
6	(Italy) **Ferrari**	2002	17	15	88.24%
6	(Italy) **Ferrari**	2004	18	15	83.33%
6	(Germany) **Mercedes**	2019	21	15	71.43%
10	(United Kingdom) **McLaren**	2025	24	14	58.33%

=== Highest percentage of wins in a season ===
	Constructor	Season	Races	Wins	Percentage
1	(Austria) **Red Bull Racing**	2023	22	21	95.45%
2	(United Kingdom) **McLaren**	1988	16	15	93.75%
3	(Germany) **Mercedes**	2016	21	19	90.48%
4	(Italy) **Ferrari**	2002	17	15	88.24%
5	(Italy) **Ferrari**	1952	8	7	87.50%
6	(Italy) Alfa Romeo	1950	7	6	85.71%
7	(Germany) **Mercedes**	2014	19	16	84.21%
7	(Germany) **Mercedes**	2015	19	16	84.21%
9	(Italy) **Ferrari**	2004	18	15	83.33%
10	(Italy) **Ferrari**	1953	9	7	77.78%

=== Most seasons with a win ===
	Constructor	Seasons with a win
1	(Italy) **Ferrari**	60
2	(United Kingdom) **McLaren**	40
3	(United Kingdom) **Williams**	23
4	(United Kingdom) Lotus	21
5	(Austria) **Red Bull Racing**	17
6	(Germany) **Mercedes**	16
7	(United Kingdom) Brabham	14
8	(France) Renault	10
9	(United Kingdom) BRM	9
9	(United Kingdom) Tyrrell	9
9	(United Kingdom) / (Italy) Benetton	9

Notes

- Source unites Lotus, Team Lotus and Lotus F1 statistics.

=== Most consecutive wins ===
	Constructor	Wins	Season(s)	Races
1	(Austria) **Red Bull Racing**	15	2022–2023	2022 Abu Dhabi Grand Prix – 2023 Italian Grand Prix
2	(United Kingdom) **McLaren**	11	1988	1988 Brazilian Grand Prix – 1988 Belgian Grand Prix
3	(Italy) **Ferrari**	10	2002	2002 Canadian Grand Prix – 2002 Japanese Grand Prix
3	(Germany) **Mercedes**	10	2015–2016	2015 Japanese Grand Prix – 2016 Russian Grand Prix
3	(Germany) **Mercedes**	10	2016	2016 Monaco Grand Prix – 2016 Singapore Grand Prix
3	(Germany) **Mercedes**	10	2018–2019	2018 Brazilian Grand Prix – 2019 French Grand Prix
7	(Austria) **Red Bull Racing**	9	2013	2013 Belgian Grand Prix – 2013 Brazilian Grand Prix
7	(Austria) **Red Bull Racing**	9	2022	2022 French Grand Prix – 2022 Mexico City Grand Prix
7	(Austria) **Red Bull Racing**	9	2023–2024	2023 Japanese Grand Prix – 2024 Saudi Arabian Grand Prix
10	(United Kingdom) **McLaren**	8	1984–1985	1984 British Grand Prix – 1985 Brazilian Grand Prix
10	(Italy) **Ferrari**	8	2003–2004	2003 Italian Grand Prix – 2004 Spanish Grand Prix
10	(Germany) **Mercedes**	8	2014–2015	2014 Italian Grand Prix – 2015 Australian Grand Prix

=== Most consecutive wins from first race of season ===
	Constructor	Wins	Season	Races
1	(Austria) **Red Bull Racing**	14	2023	2023 Bahrain Grand Prix – 2023 Italian Grand Prix
2	(United Kingdom) **McLaren**	11	1988	1988 Brazilian Grand Prix – 1988 Belgian Grand Prix
3	(Germany) **Mercedes**	8	2019	2019 Australian Grand Prix – 2019 French Grand Prix
4	(Germany) **Mercedes**	6	2014	2014 Australian Grand Prix – 2014 Monaco Grand Prix
4	(Germany) **Mercedes**	6	2026	2026 Australian Grand Prix – 2026 Monaco Grand Prix
6	(United Kingdom) **Williams**	5	1992	1992 South African Grand Prix – 1992 San Marino Grand Prix
6	(United Kingdom) **Williams**	5	1996	1996 Australian Grand Prix – 1996 San Marino Grand Prix
6	(Italy) **Ferrari**	5	2004	2004 Australian Grand Prix – 2004 Spanish Grand Prix
9	(United Kingdom) **McLaren**	4	1991	1991 United States Grand Prix – 1991 Monaco Grand Prix
9	(United Kingdom) Benetton	4	1994	1994 Brazilian Grand Prix – 1994 Monaco Grand Prix
9	(France) Renault	4	2005	2005 Australian Grand Prix – 2005 San Marino Grand Prix
9	(Germany) **Mercedes**	4	2016	2016 Australian Grand Prix – 2016 Russian Grand Prix
9	(Germany) **Mercedes**	4	2020	2020 Austrian Grand Prix – 2020 British Grand Prix

=== Most wins in the same Grand Prix ===
	Constructor	Wins	Grand Prix	Seasons
1	(Italy) **Ferrari**	21	German Grand Prix	1951, 1952, 1953, 1956, 1959, 1963, 1964, 1972, 1974, 1977, 1982, 1983, 1985, 1994, 1999, 2000, 2002, 2004, 2006, 2010, 2012
2	(Italy) **Ferrari**	20	Italian Grand Prix	1951, 1952, 1960, 1961, 1964, 1966, 1970, 1975, 1979, 1988, 1996, 1998, 2000, 2002, 2003, 2004, 2006, 2010, 2019, 2024
3	(Italy) **Ferrari**	19	British Grand Prix	1951, 1952, 1953, 1954, 1956, 1958, 1961, 1976, 1978, 1990, 1998, 2002, 2003, 2004, 2007, 2011, 2018, 2022, 2026
4	(Italy) **Ferrari**	18	Belgian Grand Prix	1952, 1953, 1956, 1961, 1966, 1975, 1976, 1979, 1984, 1996, 1997, 2001, 2002, 2007, 2008, 2009, 2018, 2019
5	(Italy) **Ferrari**	17	French Grand Prix	1952, 1953, 1956, 1958, 1959, 1961, 1968, 1975, 1990, 1997, 1998, 2001, 2002, 2004, 2006, 2007, 2008
6	(United Kingdom) **McLaren**	16	Monaco Grand Prix	1984, 1985, 1986, 1988, 1989, 1990, 1991, 1992, 1993, 1998, 2000, 2002, 2005, 2007, 2008, 2025
7	(United Kingdom) **McLaren**	15	British Grand Prix	1973, 1975, 1977, 1981, 1982, 1984, 1985, 1988, 1989, 1999, 2000, 2001, 2005, 2008, 2025
7	(United Kingdom) **McLaren**	15	Belgian Grand Prix	1968, 1974, 1982, 1987, 1988, 1989, 1990, 1991, 1999, 2000, 2004, 2005, 2010, 2012, 2025
9	(United Kingdom) **McLaren**	14	Hungarian Grand Prix	1988, 1991, 1992, 1999, 2000, 2005, 2007, 2008, 2009, 2011, 2012, 2024, 2025, 2026
9	(United Kingdom) **McLaren**	14	Brazilian Grand Prix	1974, 1984, 1985, 1987, 1988, 1991, 1993, 1998, 1999, 2001, 2005, 2012, 2025, 2026
10	(United Kingdom) **McLaren**	13	Canadian Grand Prix	1968, 1973, 1974, 1976, 1988, 1990, 1992, 1999, 2005, 2007, 2010, 2011, 2012

Notes

- Source distinguishes between the Brazilian Grand Prix and the São Paulo Grand Prix

=== Most consecutive seasons with a win ===
	Constructor	Seasons	Number of seasons
1	(Italy) **Ferrari**	1994–2013	20
2	(United Kingdom) **McLaren**	1981–1993	13
3	(United Kingdom) Lotus	1960–1970	11
3	(Germany) **Mercedes**	2012–2022	11
3	(Austria) **Red Bull Racing**	2016–2026 (ongoing)	11
6	(United Kingdom) **Williams**	1979–1987	9
6	(United Kingdom) **Williams**	1989–1997	9
6	(United Kingdom) **McLaren**	1997–2005	9
9	(United Kingdom) Benetton	1989–1995	7

=== Fewest starts before first win ===
	Constructor	Number of starts before first win
1	(Italy) / (Switzerland) Alfa Romeo (Note: Alfa Romeo held an Italian licence from 1950–1951 and 1979–1985, and a Swiss licence from 2019–2023.)	1
1	(Germany) **Mercedes**	1
1	(Canada) Wolf	1
1	(United Kingdom) Brawn	1
5	(United Kingdom) March	2
6	(United Kingdom) Tyrrell	5
7	(France) Matra	8
7	(Italy) AlphaTauri	8
9	(Italy) **Ferrari**	9
10	(Japan) Honda	11

Notes

- Source includes Epperly, Kurtis Kraft, Kuzma and Watson in the top 10, but the Indianapolis 500 did not count towards the International Cup for F1 Manufacturers.

=== Most races started before first win ===
	Constructor	Number of starts before first win
1	(Republic of Ireland) Jordan	127
2	(United Kingdom) / (Austria) **Red Bull Racing**	74
3	(United States) / (United Kingdom) Shadow (Note: Shadow held an American licence from 1973–1975, and a British licence from 1976–1980.)	69
4	(United Kingdom) **Williams**	50
5	(Italy) Toro Rosso	49
6	(United Kingdom) Stewart	47
7	(United Kingdom) Racing Point	37
8	(Italy) Maserati	27
9	(France) Renault	25
10	(France) Ligier/Talbot Ligier	24

Notes

- Source separates Sauber, BMW Sauber and Kick Sauber statistics.

=== Most races started without a win ===
	Constructor	Seasons	Starts	Best result
1	(United Kingdom) Arrows	1978–2002	382	2nd
2	(Italy) Minardi	1985–2005	340	2nd
3	(United States) **Haas**	2016–2026	235	4th
4	Force India	2008–2018	212	2nd
5	(United Kingdom) Lola	1962–1963, 1967–1968, 1974–1975, 1985–1991, 1993, 1997	149	2nd
6	(United Kingdom) **Aston Martin**	1959–1960, 2021–2026	140	2nd
7	(Japan) Toyota	2002–2009	139	2nd
8	(Italy) Osella	1980–1990	132	4th
9	(United Kingdom) Surtees	1970–1978	118	2nd
10	(United Kingdom) BAR	1999–2005	117	2nd

Notes

- Source separates Sauber, BMW Sauber and Kick Sauber statistics. Therefore, it has achieved its only win as BMW Sauber.
- Source separates Arrows and Footwork Arrows statistics.
- Source unites Force India and Racing Point Force India statistics.
- Source unites Aston Martin and Aston Martin Aramco statistics. The Aston Martin factory team competed as Aston Martin in 1959, 1960, and 2021, and is competing as Aston Martin Aramco from 2022 onwards.

== Pole positions ==
=== Total pole positions ===
	Constructor	Seasons	Poles	Entries	Percentage
1	(Italy) **Ferrari**	1950–2026	255	1145	22.27%
2	(United Kingdom) **McLaren**	1966–2026	181	1019	17.76%
3	(Germany) **Mercedes**	1954–1955, 2010–2026	155	362	42.82%
4	(United Kingdom) **Williams**	1978–2026	128	872	14.68%
5	(United Kingdom) / (Austria) **Red Bull Racing**	2005–2026	114	439	25.97%
6	(United Kingdom) Lotus	1958–1994	107	492	21.75%
7	(France) / (United Kingdom) Renault	1977–1985, 2002–2011, 2016–2020	51	403	12.66%
8	(United Kingdom) Brabham	1962–1987, 1989–1992	39	403	9.68%
9	(United Kingdom) / (Italy) Benetton	1986–2001	15	260	5.77%
10	(United Kingdom) Tyrrell	1970–1998	14	433	3.23%

Notes

- Source unites Lotus, Team Lotus and Lotus F1 statistics.

=== Percentage of pole positions ===
	Constructor	Seasons	Poles	Entries	Percentage
1	(Italy) Lancia	1954–1955	2	4	50.00%
2	(Germany) **Mercedes**	1954–1955, 2010–2026	155	362	42.82%
3	(United Kingdom) Brawn	2009	5	17	29.41%
4	(United Kingdom) / (Austria) **Red Bull Racing**	2005–2026	114	439	25.97%
5	(United Kingdom) Vanwall	1954–1960	7	29	24.14%
6	(Italy) **Ferrari**	1950–2026	255	1145	22.27%
7	(United Kingdom) Lotus	1958–1994	107	491	21.79%
8	(United Kingdom) **McLaren**	1966–2026	181	1019	17.76%
9	(United Kingdom) **Williams**	1978–2026	128	872	14.68%
10	(Italy) Maserati	1950–1960	10	71	14.08%

Notes

- Source includes Epperly, Kurtis Kraft and Watson in the top 10, but the Indianapolis 500 did not count towards the International Cup for F1 Manufacturers.
- Source unites Lotus, Team Lotus and Lotus F1 statistics.

=== Most pole positions in a season ===
	Constructor	Season	Races	Poles	Percentage
1	(Germany) **Mercedes**	2016	21	20	95.24%
2	(Austria) **Red Bull Racing**	2011	19	18	94.74%
2	(Germany) **Mercedes**	2014	19	18	94.74%
2	(Germany) **Mercedes**	2015	19	18	94.74%
5	(United Kingdom) **McLaren**	1988	16	15	93.75%
5	(United Kingdom) **McLaren**	1989	16	15	93.75%
5	(United Kingdom) **Williams**	1992	16	15	93.75%
5	(United Kingdom) **Williams**	1993	16	15	93.75%
5	(Austria) **Red Bull Racing**	2010	19	15	78.95%
5	(Germany) **Mercedes**	2017	20	15	75.00%
5	(Germany) **Mercedes**	2020	17	15	88.24%

=== Highest percentage of pole positions in a season ===
	Constructor	Season	Races	Poles	Percentage
1	(Germany) **Mercedes**	2016	21	20	95.24%
2	(Germany) **Mercedes**	2014	19	18	94.74%
2	(Germany) **Mercedes**	2015	19	18	94.74%
2	(Austria) **Red Bull Racing**	2011	19	18	94.74%
5	(United Kingdom) **Williams**	1992	16	15	93.75%
5	(United Kingdom) **Williams**	1993	16	15	93.75%
5	(United Kingdom) **McLaren**	1988	16	15	93.75%
5	(United Kingdom) **McLaren**	1989	16	15	93.75%
9	(Germany) **Mercedes**	2020	17	15	88.24%
10	(Italy) **Ferrari**	1952	8	7	87.50%

=== Most seasons with a pole position ===
	Constructor	Seasons with a pole position
1	(Italy) **Ferrari**	58
2	(United Kingdom) **McLaren**	33
3	(United Kingdom) **Williams**	25
4	(United Kingdom) Brabham	17
4	(Germany) **Mercedes**	17
6	(United Kingdom) Lotus	16
7	(Austria) **Red Bull Racing**	15
8	(France) Renault	11
9	(United Kingdom) BRM	7
10	(United Kingdom) Tyrrell	6

Notes

- Source unites Lotus, Team Lotus and Lotus F1 statistics.
- Source includes Kurtis Kraft in the top 10, but the Indianapolis 500 did not count towards the International Cup for F1 Manufacturers.

=== Most consecutive pole positions ===
	Constructor	Poles	Season(s)	Races
1	(United Kingdom) **Williams**	24	1992–1993	1992 French Grand Prix – 1993 Japanese Grand Prix
2	(Germany) **Mercedes**	23	2014–2015	2014 British Grand Prix – 2015 Italian Grand Prix
3	(Germany) **Mercedes**	18	2016–2017	2016 Canadian Grand Prix – 2017 Bahrain Grand Prix
4	(United Kingdom) **McLaren**	17	1988–1989	1988 German Grand Prix – 1989 German Grand Prix
5	(Austria) **Red Bull Racing**	16	2010–2011	2010 Abu Dhabi Grand Prix – 2011 Japanese Grand Prix
6	(Germany) **Mercedes**	14	2019–2020	2019 Abu Dhabi Grand Prix – 2020 Emilia Romagna Grand Prix
7	(United Kingdom) **McLaren**	12	1989–1990	1989 Belgian Grand Prix – 1990 Mexican Grand Prix
8	(Germany) **Mercedes**	11	2015–2016	2015 Japanese Grand Prix – 2016 Spanish Grand Prix
9	(United Kingdom) Lotus	10	1967–1968	1967 Dutch Grand Prix – 1968 South African Grand Prix
9	(United Kingdom) **Williams**	10	1996–1997	1996 Belgian Grand Prix – 1997 Spanish Grand Prix
9	(Germany) **Mercedes**	10	2026	2026 Australian Grand Prix – 2026 Belgian Grand Prix

Notes

- Source unites Lotus, Team Lotus and Lotus F1 statistics.

=== Most consecutive pole positions from first race of season ===
	Constructor	Poles	Season	Races
1	(United Kingdom) **Williams**	15	1993	1993 South African Grand Prix – 1993 Japanese Grand Prix
1	(Austria) **Red Bull Racing**	15	2011	2011 Australian Grand Prix – 2011 Japanese Grand Prix
3	(Germany) **Mercedes**	13	2020	2020 Austrian Grand Prix – 2020 Emilia Romagna Grand Prix
4	(Germany) **Mercedes**	12	2015	2015 Australian Grand Prix – 2015 Italian Grand Prix
5	(Germany) **Mercedes**	10	2026	2026 Australian Grand Prix – 2026 Belgian Grand Prix
6	(United Kingdom) **McLaren**	9	1989	1989 Brazilian Grand Prix – 1989 German Grand Prix
6	(United Kingdom) **McLaren**	9	1998	1998 Australian Grand Prix – 1998 British Grand Prix
8	(United Kingdom) **McLaren**	7	1988	1988 Brazilian Grand Prix – 1988 French Grand Prix
8	(Austria) **Red Bull Racing**	7	2010	2010 Bahrain Grand Prix – 2010 Turkish Grand Prix
8	(Germany) **Mercedes**	7	2014	2014 Australian Grand Prix – 2014 Canadian Grand Prix
8	(Austria) **Red Bull Racing**	7	2024	2024 Bahrain Grand Prix – 2024 Emilia Romagna Grand Prix

=== Most pole positions in the same Grand Prix ===
	Constructor	Poles	Grand Prix
1	(Italy) **Ferrari**	23	Italian Grand Prix
2	(Italy) **Ferrari**	20	German Grand Prix
3	(Italy) **Ferrari**	18	French Grand Prix
4	(Italy) **Ferrari**	17	Belgian Grand Prix
5	(Italy) **Ferrari**	16	British Grand Prix
6	(Italy) **Ferrari**	14	Spanish Grand Prix
7	(United Kingdom) **Williams**	13	British Grand Prix
7	(Italy) **Ferrari**	13	Monaco Grand Prix
9	(United Kingdom) **McLaren**	12	German Grand Prix
9	(United Kingdom) **McLaren**	12	Italian Grand Prix
9	(United Kingdom) **McLaren**	12	Monaco Grand Prix
9	(United Kingdom) **McLaren**	12	Belgian Grand Prix
9	(United Kingdom) **McLaren**	12	Brazilian Grand Prix
9	(Germany) **Mercedes**	12	British Grand Prix

Notes

- Source distinguishes between the Brazilian Grand Prix and the São Paulo Grand Prix

=== Most consecutive seasons with a pole position ===
	Constructor	Seasons	Number of seasons
1	(Italy) **Ferrari**	1994–2008	15
1	(Germany) **Mercedes**	2012–2026 (ongoing)	15
3	(United Kingdom) Lotus	1960–1970	11
4	(United Kingdom) **McLaren**	2003–2012	10
5	(United Kingdom) **Williams**	1989–1997	9
5	(Austria) **Red Bull Racing**	2018–2026 (ongoing)	9
7	(Italy) **Ferrari**	1951–1956	6
7	(Italy) **Ferrari**	1974–1979	6
7	(Italy) **Ferrari**	2021–2026 (ongoing)	6
7	(France) Renault	1979–1984	6
7	(United Kingdom) Brabham	1980–1985	6
7	(United Kingdom) **McLaren**	1988–1993	6

=== Fewest starts before first pole position ===
	Constructor	Number of starts before first pole position
1	(Italy) / (Switzerland) Alfa Romeo	1
1	(Germany) **Mercedes**	1
1	(Italy) Lancia	1
1	(United Kingdom) Lola	1
1	(United Kingdom) March	1
1	(United Kingdom) Tyrrell	1
1	(United Kingdom) Brawn	1
8	(Italy) **Ferrari**	9
9	(Canada) Wolf	11
10	(United Kingdom) Benetton	12

Notes

- Source includes Ewing, Kurtis Kraft, Stevens, Lesovsky and Watson in the top 10, but the Indianapolis 500 did not count towards the International Cup for F1 Manufacturers.

=== Most races started before first pole position ===
	Constructor	Number of starts before first pole position
1	(United States) **Haas**	143
2	(France) **Alpine**	127
3	(United Kingdom) BAR	87
4	(United Kingdom) / (Austria) **Red Bull Racing**	74
5	(United Kingdom) **McLaren**	67
6	(Japan) Toyota	59
6	(Republic of Ireland) Jordan	59
8	(United Kingdom) Toleman	50
8	(United Kingdom) **Williams**	50
10	(Italy) Toro Rosso	49

Notes

- Source separates Sauber, BMW Sauber and Kick Sauber statistics.

=== Most races started without a pole position ===
	Constructor	Seasons	Starts	Best grid position
1	(Italy) Minardi	1985–2005	340	2nd
2	(United Kingdom) **Aston Martin**	1959–1960, 2021–2026	140	2nd
3	(Italy) Osella	1980–1990	132	8th
4	(United Kingdom) Surtees	1970–1978	118	2nd
5	(United Kingdom) Ensign	1973–1982	98	3rd
6	(Germany) ATS	1977–1984	89	4th
7	(United Kingdom) Jaguar	2000–2004	85	2nd
8	(France) Prost	1997–2001	83	3rd
8	(Italy) AlphaTauri	2020–2023	83	2nd
10	(Italy) Dallara	1998–1992	78	3rd

Notes

- Source separates Sauber, BMW Sauber and Kick Sauber statistics. Therefore, it has achieved its only pole position as BMW Sauber.
- Source separates Arrows and Footwork Arrows statistics.
- Source unites Aston Martin and Aston Martin Aramco statistics. The Aston Martin factory team competed as Aston Martin in 1959, 1960, and 2021, and competes as Aston Martin Aramco from 2022 onwards.

=== Percentage pole positions converted to wins (at least 10 poles) ===
	Constructor	Seasons	Poles	Wins	Percentage
1	(United Kingdom) Cooper	1950–1969	11	10	90.91%
2	(Germany) **Mercedes**	1954–1955, 2010–2026	155	118	76.13%
3	(Italy) / (Switzerland) Alfa Romeo	1950–1951, 1979–1985, 2019–2023	12	9	75.00%
4	(United Kingdom) / (Austria) **Red Bull Racing**	2005–2026	114	83	72.81%
5	(United Kingdom) Tyrrell	1970–1998	14	10	71.43%
6	(United Kingdom) **McLaren**	1966–2026	181	106	58.56%
7	(United Kingdom) **Williams**	1978–2026	128	70	54.69%
8	(Italy) **Ferrari**	1950–2026	255	137	53.73%
9	(Italy) Maserati	1950–1960	10	5	50.00%
10	(France) / (United Kingdom) Renault	1977–1985, 2002–2011, 2016–2020	51	24	47.06%

=== Total 1–2 qualifying results ===
	Constructor	Seasons	1–2s
1	(Germany) **Mercedes**	1954–1955, 2010–2026	88
2	(Italy) **Ferrari**	1950–2026	83
3	(United Kingdom) **McLaren**	1966–2026	71
4	(United Kingdom) **Williams**	1978–2026	62
5	(United Kingdom) / (Austria) **Red Bull Racing**	2005–2026	28
6	(France) / (United Kingdom) Renault	1977–1985, 2002–2011, 2016–2020	22
7	(United Kingdom) Lotus	1958–1994	14
8	(Italy) / (Switzerland) Alfa Romeo	1950–1951, 1979–1985, 2019–2023	9
9	(United Kingdom) Brabham	1962–1987, 1989–1992	6
10	(France) Ligier/Talbot Ligier	1976–1996	5

Notes

- Source includes Kurtis Kraft in top 10, but the Indianapolis 500 did not count towards the International Cup for F1 Manufacturers.
- Source unites Lotus, Team Lotus and Lotus F1 statistics.

=== Total front-row lockouts ===
The "front row" refers to the cars at the front of each column of cars on the starting grid. Since the 1973 German Grand Prix, the starting grid has been formed of two columns of cars, so the front row has consisted of two cars. Previously, the front row consisted of either two, three, or four cars.

	Constructor	Number
1	(Germany) **Mercedes**	86
2	(United Kingdom) **McLaren**	70
3	(Italy) **Ferrari**	68
4	(United Kingdom) **Williams**	62
5	(Austria) **Red Bull Racing**	28
6	(France) Renault	22
7	(United Kingdom) Lotus	9
8	(France) Ligier/Talbot Ligier	5
9	(Italy) / (Switzerland) Alfa Romeo	4
9	(United Kingdom) Brabham	4

Notes

- Source unites Lotus, Team Lotus and Lotus F1 statistics.

== Fastest laps ==
=== Total fastest laps ===
	Constructor	Seasons	Fastest laps
1	(Italy) **Ferrari**	1950–2026	271
2	(United Kingdom) **McLaren**	1966–2026	185
3	(United Kingdom) **Williams**	1978–2026	134
4	(Germany) **Mercedes**	1954–1955, 2010–2026	125
5	(United Kingdom) / (Austria) **Red Bull Racing**	2005–2026	104
6	(United Kingdom) Lotus	1958–1994	71
7	(United Kingdom) Brabham	1962–1987, 1989–1992	41
8	(United Kingdom) / (Italy) Benetton	1986–2001	36
9	(France) / (United Kingdom) Renault	1977–1985, 2002–2011, 2016–2020	33
10	(United Kingdom) Tyrrell	1970–1998	20

Notes

- Source credits an extra fastest lap for **McLaren** in the 1970 South African Grand Prix.
- Source unites Lotus, Team Lotus and Lotus F1 statistics.

=== Most fastest laps in a season ===
	Constructor	Season	Races	Fastest laps	Percentage
1	(Italy) **Ferrari**	2004	18	14	77.78%
2	(Italy) **Ferrari**	2008	18	13	72.22%
2	(Germany) **Mercedes**	2015	19	13	68.42%
4	(United Kingdom) **McLaren**	2000	17	12	70.59%
4	(United Kingdom) **McLaren**	2005	19	12	63.16%
4	(United Kingdom) **McLaren**	2025	24	12	50.00%
4	(Italy) **Ferrari**	2002	17	12	70.59%
4	(Italy) **Ferrari**	2007	17	12	70.59%
4	(Austria) **Red Bull Racing**	2013	19	12	63.16%
4	(Germany) **Mercedes**	2014	19	12	63.16%

=== Highest percentage of fastest laps in a season ===
	Constructor	Season	Races	Fastest laps	Percentage
1	(Italy) Alfa Romeo	1951	8	7	87.50%
1	(Italy) **Ferrari**	1952	8	7	87.50%
3	(Italy) **Ferrari**	2004	18	14	77.78%
4	(Italy) **Ferrari**	2008	18	13	72.22%
5	(United Kingdom) **McLaren**	2000	17	12	70.59%
5	(Italy) **Ferrari**	2002	17	12	70.59%
5	(Italy) **Ferrari**	2007	17	12	70.59%
8	(United Kingdom) **Williams**	1986	16	11	68.75%
8	(United Kingdom) **Williams**	1992	16	11	68.75%
8	(United Kingdom) **Williams**	1996	16	11	68.75%

=== Most seasons with a fastest lap ===
	Constructor	Seasons with a fastest lap
1	(Italy) **Ferrari**	59
2	(United Kingdom) **McLaren**	46
3	(United Kingdom) **Williams**	27
4	(United Kingdom) Lotus	19
5	(Austria) **Red Bull Racing**	18
6	(United Kingdom) Brabham	17
6	(Germany) **Mercedes**	17
8	(United Kingdom) / (Italy) Benetton	12
8	(France) Renault	12
10	(United Kingdom) BRM	9
10	(United Kingdom) Tyrrell	9

Notes

- Source unites Lotus, Team Lotus and Lotus F1 statistics.

=== Most consecutive races with a fastest lap ===
	Constructor	Fastest Laps	Season(s)	Races
1	(Italy) **Ferrari**	9	2004	2004 Bahrain Grand Prix – 2004 British Grand Prix
2	(Italy) **Ferrari**	8	1970–1971	1970 German Grand Prix – 1971 Spanish Grand Prix
3	(Italy) **Ferrari**	7	1952–1953	1952 Belgian Grand Prix – 1953 Argentine Grand Prix
3	(Germany) **Mercedes**	7	2014	2014 British Grand Prix – 2014 Japanese Grand Prix
5	(Italy) Alfa Romeo	6	1951	1951 Belgian Grand Prix – 1951 Spanish Grand Prix
5	(United Kingdom) **McLaren**	6	1988	1988 San Marino Grand Prix – 1988 French Grand Prix
5	(United Kingdom) **McLaren**	6	1999	1999 French Grand Prix – 1999 Belgian Grand Prix
5	(United Kingdom) **McLaren**	6	2005	2005 French Grand Prix – 2005 Italian Grand Prix
5	(United Kingdom) **Williams**	6	1993	1993 Hungarian Grand Prix – 1993 Australian Grand Prix
5	(Italy) **Ferrari**	6	2002	2002 German Grand Prix – 2002 Japanese Grand Prix
5	(Italy) **Ferrari**	6	2007	2007 United States Grand Prix – 2007 Turkish Grand Prix
5	(Italy) **Ferrari**	6	2008	2008 Spanish Grand Prix – 2008 British Grand Prix
5	(Italy) **Ferrari**	6	2008	2008 Hungarian Grand Prix – 2008 Japanese Grand Prix

=== Most fastest laps in the same Grand Prix ===
	Constructor	Fastest laps	Grand Prix
1	(Italy) **Ferrari**	21	British Grand Prix
2	(Italy) **Ferrari**	19	Italian Grand Prix
2	(Italy) **Ferrari**	19	Belgian Grand Prix
4	(Italy) **Ferrari**	17	German Grand Prix
4	(Italy) **Ferrari**	17	Monaco Grand Prix
6	(Italy) **Ferrari**	16	French Grand Prix
6	(United Kingdom) **McLaren**	16	Italian Grand Prix
8	(Italy) **Ferrari**	14	Spanish Grand Prix
9	(Italy) **Ferrari**	13	United States Grand Prix
10	(United Kingdom) **McLaren**	12	Monaco Grand Prix

Notes

- Source distinguishes between the Brazilian Grand Prix and the São Paulo Grand Prix

=== Most consecutive seasons with a fastest lap ===
	Constructor	Seasons	Number of seasons
1	(Austria) **Red Bull Racing**	2009–2026 (ongoing)	18
2	(Italy) **Ferrari**	1995–2011	17
3	(Germany) **Mercedes**	2012–2026 (ongoing)	15
4	(United Kingdom) **McLaren**	1981–1993	13
4	(United Kingdom) **Williams**	1985–1997	13
6	(United Kingdom) **McLaren**	1997–2008	12
7	(United Kingdom) Benetton	1990–1998	9
8	(United Kingdom) **McLaren**	1970–1977	8
8	(United Kingdom) Brabham	1977–1984	8
10	(Italy) Maserati	1952–1958	7
10	(United Kingdom) Tyrrell	1971–1977	7
10	(Italy) **Ferrari**	2013–2019	7
10	(United Kingdom) **McLaren**	2020–2026 (ongoing)	7

Notes

- Source includes Kurtis Kraft in top 10, but the Indianapolis 500 did not count towards the International Cup for F1 Manufacturers.

=== Fewest starts before first fastest lap ===
	Constructor	Number of starts before first fastest lap
1	(Italy) / (Switzerland) Alfa Romeo	1
1	(Germany) **Mercedes**	1
1	(Italy) Lancia	1
4	(United Kingdom) Brawn	2
5	(United Kingdom) March	4
6	(France) Matra	5
7	(United Kingdom) Tyrrell	6
7	(United States) Parnelli	6
7	(Canada) Wolf	6
7	(United Kingdom) Toleman	6

Notes

- Source includes Epperly and Kurtis Kraft in the top 10, but the Indianapolis 500 did not count towards the International Cup for F1 Manufacturers.

=== Most races started before first fastest lap ===
	Constructor	Number of starts before first fastest lap
1	(Switzerland) / (Germany) Sauber/BMW Sauber	255
2	(Italy) Toro Rosso	190
3	(France) **Alpine**	85
4	(United Kingdom) / (Austria) **Red Bull Racing**	79
4	(United Kingdom) Ensign	79
6	(Japan) Toyota	66
7	(United Kingdom) **Aston Martin**	62
8	(United States) **Haas**	56
9	(United Kingdom) **McLaren**	34
10	(United Kingdom) Cooper	32

Notes

- Source separates Sauber, BMW Sauber and Kick Sauber statistics.
- Source separates **Racing Bulls** and **RB** statistics.

=== Most races started without a fastest lap ===
	Constructor	Seasons	Starts
1	(United Kingdom) Arrows	1978–2002	382
2	(Italy) Minardi	1985–2005	340
3	(United Kingdom) Lola	1962–1963, 1967–1968, 1974–1975, 1985–1991, 1993, 1997	149
4	(Italy) Osella	1980–1990	132
5	(United Kingdom) BAR	1999–2005	117
6	(Germany) ATS	1977–1984	89
7	(United Kingdom) Jaguar	2000–2004	85
8	(France) Prost	1997–2001	83
9	(Italy) Dallara	1998–1992	78
10	(Russia) / (United Kingdom) Marussia (Note: Marussia held a Russian licence from 2012 to 2014, and a British licence in 2015)	2012–2015	73

Notes

- Source separates Arrows and Footwork Arrows statistics.

== Podiums ==
=== Total podiums ===
	Constructor	Podiums	Podium races (Note: Races in which the constructor scored one or more podium finishes.)	Seasons
1	(Italy) **Ferrari**	849	651	1950–2026
2	(United Kingdom) **McLaren**	568	451	1966–2026
3	(Germany) **Mercedes**	334	229	1954–1955, 2010–2026
4	(United Kingdom) **Williams**	315	246	1978–2026
5	(United Kingdom) / (Austria) **Red Bull Racing**	313	247	2005–2026
6	(United Kingdom) Lotus	172	157	1958–1994
7	(United Kingdom) Brabham	124	106	1962–1987, 1989–1992
8	(France) / (United Kingdom) Renault	103	91	1977–1985, 2002–2011, 2016–2020
9	(United Kingdom) / (Italy) Benetton	102	94	1986–2001
10	(United Kingdom) Tyrrell	77	66	1970–1998

Notes

- Source unites Lotus, Team Lotus and Lotus F1 statistics.

=== Most podiums in a season ===
	Constructor	Season	Podiums	Entries	Percentage
1	(United Kingdom) **McLaren**	2025	34	48	70.83%
2	(Germany) **Mercedes**	2016	33	42	78.57%
3	(Germany) **Mercedes**	2015	32	38	84.21%
3	(Germany) **Mercedes**	2019	32	42	76.19%
5	(Germany) **Mercedes**	2014	31	38	81.58%
6	(Austria) **Red Bull Racing**	2023	30	44	68.18%
7	(Italy) **Ferrari**	2004	29	36	80.56%
8	(Germany) **Mercedes**	2021	28	44	63.64%
8	(Austria) **Red Bull Racing**	2022	28	44	63.64%
10	(Italy) **Ferrari**	2002	27	34	79.41%
10	(Austria) **Red Bull Racing**	2011	27	38	71.05%

=== Most seasons with a podium ===
	Constructor	Seasons with a podium
1	(Italy) **Ferrari**	75
2	(United Kingdom) **McLaren**	53
3	(United Kingdom) **Williams**	38
4	(United Kingdom) Lotus	29
5	(United Kingdom) Brabham	22
6	(United Kingdom) / (Austria) **Red Bull Racing**	21
7	(Germany) **Mercedes**	18
8	(France) / (United Kingdom) Renault	17
9	(United Kingdom) BRM	16
9	(United Kingdom) / (Italy) Benetton	16

Notes

- Source unites Lotus, Team Lotus and Lotus F1 statistics.

=== Most consecutive races with a podium ===
	Constructor	Podiums	Season(s)	Races
1	(Italy) **Ferrari**	53	1999–2002	1999 Malaysian Grand Prix – 2002 Japanese Grand Prix
2	(Germany) **Mercedes**	28	2014–2015	2014 Australian Grand Prix – 2015 British Grand Prix
3	(Italy) **Ferrari**	22	2003–2005	2003 Italian Grand Prix – 2005 Australian Grand Prix
3	(Germany) **Mercedes**	22	2017–2018	2017 Canadian Grand Prix – 2018 French Grand Prix
5	(Germany) **Mercedes**	21	2016–2017	2016 Monaco Grand Prix – 2017 Spanish Grand Prix
6	(United Kingdom) **McLaren**	19	2007–2008	2007 Australian Grand Prix – 2008 Malaysian Grand Prix
6	(Austria) **Red Bull Racing**	19	2010–2011	2010 Brazilian Grand Prix – 2011 Indian Grand Prix
6	(Austria) **Red Bull Racing**	19	2022	2022 Saudi Arabian Grand Prix – 2022 Mexico City Grand Prix
6	(Germany) **Mercedes**	19	2026	2026 Australian Grand Prix – 2026 Mexico City Grand Prix
10	(United Kingdom) **Williams**	17	1993–1994	1993 South African Grand Prix – 1994 Brazilian Grand Prix
10	(France) Renault	17	2005–2006	2005 Turkish Grand Prix – 2006 French Grand Prix
10	(Germany) **Mercedes**	17	2021–2022	2021 French Grand Prix – 2022 Bahrain Grand Prix

=== Most consecutive seasons with a podium ===
	Constructor	Seasons	Number of seasons
1	(Italy) **Ferrari**	1981–2026 (ongoing)	46
2	(United Kingdom) **McLaren**	1981–2012	32
3	(United Kingdom) Lotus	1960–1988	29
4	(United Kingdom) **Williams**	1978–2005	28
5	(Italy) **Ferrari**	1950–1972	23
6	(United Kingdom) / (Austria) **Red Bull Racing**	2006–2026 (ongoing)	21
7	(United Kingdom) / (Italy) Benetton	1986–2001	16
8	(United Kingdom) BRM	1958–1972	15
8	(Germany) **Mercedes**	2012–2026 (ongoing)	15
10	(United Kingdom) **McLaren**	1968–1972	12

=== Fewest starts before first podium ===
	Constructor	Number of starts before first podium
1	(Italy) / (Switzerland) Alfa Romeo	1
1	(Italy) **Ferrari**	1
1	(France) Gordini	1
1	(Germany) **Mercedes**	1
1	(United Kingdom) March	1
1	(Canada) Wolf	1
1	(Brazil) Fittipaldi	1
1	(United Kingdom) Brawn	1
9	(Italy) Maserati	2
9	(United States) Shadow	2
9	(France) Prost	2

Notes

- Source includes Diedt, Kurtis Kraft, Kuzma, and Epperly in the top 15, but the Indianapolis 500 did not count towards the International Cup for F1 Manufacturers.

=== Most races started before first podium ===
	Constructor	Number of starts before first podium
1	(Japan) Toyota	53
2	(Republic of Ireland) Jordan	50
3	(Italy) Toro Rosso	49
4	(Switzerland) / (Germany) Sauber/BMW Sauber	43
5	(Brazil) Fittipaldi	42
6	(United Kingdom) BAR	38
7	(United Kingdom) Toleman	34
8	Force India	30
9	(United Kingdom) Racing Point	29
10	(United Kingdom) Surtees	28

Notes

- Source separates Arrows and Footwork Arrows statistics.
- Source separates Copersucar and Fittipaldi statistics.
- Source separates Sauber, BMW Sauber and Kick Sauber statistics.

=== Most races started without a podium ===
	Constructor	Seasons	Starts	Best finish
1	(Italy) Minardi	1985–2005	340	4th
2	(United States) **Haas**	2016–2026	235	4th
3	(Italy) Osella	1980–1990	132	4th
4	(United Kingdom) Ensign	1973–1982	98	4th
5	(Germany) ATS	1977–1984	89	5th
6	(Russia) / (United Kingdom) Marussia	2012–2015	73	9th
7	(Spain) HRT	2010–2012	56	13th
7	(Malaysia) Caterham	2012–2014	56	11th
9	(Germany) Zakspeed	1985–1989	53	5th
10	(France) AGS	1986–1991	47	6th

Notes

- Source indicates Ensign with an extra start, but DNQ in the 1977 British Grand Prix.

=== Most podiums without a win ===
	Constructor	Seasons	Podiums
1	(United Kingdom) BAR	1999–2005	15
2	(Japan) Toyota	2002–2009	13
3	(United Kingdom) **Aston Martin**	1959–1960, 2021–2026	9
4	(United Kingdom) Arrows	1978–2002	8
5	Force India	2008–2018	6
6	(United Kingdom) Lola	1962–1963, 1967–1968, 1974–1975, 1985–1991, 1993, 1997	3
6	(Brazil) Fittipaldi	1975–1982	3
6	(United Kingdom) Toleman	1981–1985	3
6	(France) Prost	1997–2001	3
10	(France) Talbot-Lago	1950–1951	2
10	(France) Gordini	1952–1956	2
10	(United Kingdom) Surtees	1970–1978	2
10	(Italy) Dallara	1988–1992	2
10	(United Kingdom) Jaguar	2000–2004	2

Notes

- Source includes Diedt in the top 10, but the Indianapolis 500 did not count towards the International Cup for F1 Manufacturers.
- Source separates Sauber, BMW Sauber and Kick Sauber statistics.
- Source separates Arrows and Footwork Arrows statistics.
- Source unites Force India and Racing Point Force India statistics.
- Source unites Aston Martin and Aston Martin Aramco statistics. The Aston Martin factory team competed as Aston Martin in 1959, 1960, and 2021, and is competing as Aston Martin Aramco from 2022 onwards.

== Points ==
Throughout the history of the World Championship, the points-scoring positions and the number of points awarded to each position have varied – see the List of Formula One World Championship points scoring systems for details.

=== Total points ===
	Constructor	WCC points
1	(Italy) **Ferrari**	11239
2	(Germany) **Mercedes**	8815.5
3	(United Kingdom) / (Austria) **Red Bull Racing**	8728
4	(United Kingdom) **McLaren**	8220.5
5	(United Kingdom) **Williams**	3790
6	(France) / (United Kingdom) Renault	1777
7	(United Kingdom) Lotus	1368
8	Force India	987
9	(Switzerland) / (Germany) Sauber/BMW Sauber	939
10	(United Kingdom) Brabham	864

Notes

- Source unites Lotus, Team Lotus and Lotus F1 statistics.
- Source unites Force India and Racing Point Force India statistics.
- Source unites Williams and Atlassian Williams statistics. Williams Grand Prix Engineering has been competing as Williams for the majority of its history, but as Atlassian Williams from 2026 onwards.
- Source separates Sauber, BMW Sauber and Kick Sauber statistics.

=== Total points-scoring races ===
	Constructor	Points finishes
1	(Italy) **Ferrari**	895
2	(United Kingdom) **McLaren**	778
3	(United Kingdom) **Williams**	517
4	(United Kingdom) / (Austria) **Red Bull Racing**	388
5	(Germany) **Mercedes**	336
6	(United Kingdom) Lotus	294
7	(France) / (United Kingdom) Renault	249
8	(Switzerland) / (Germany) Sauber/BMW Sauber	222
9	(United Kingdom) Brabham	184
10	(United Kingdom) / (Italy) Benetton	165

Notes

- Source unites Lotus, Team Lotus and Lotus F1 statistics.
- Source unites Williams and Atlassian Williams statistics. Williams Grand Prix Engineering has been competing as Williams for the majority of its history, but as Atlassian Williams from 2026 onwards.
- Source separates Sauber, BMW Sauber and Kick Sauber statistics.

=== Most seasons with a point-scoring race ===
	Constructor	Seasons with a point-scoring race
1	(Italy) **Ferrari**	69
2	(United Kingdom) **McLaren**	60
3	(United Kingdom) **Williams**	49
4	(United Kingdom) Lotus	36
5	(United Kingdom) Brabham	29
6	(Switzerland) / (Germany) Sauber/BMW Sauber	27
7	(United Kingdom) Tyrrell	25
8	(United Kingdom) Arrows	24
9	(France) / (United Kingdom) Renault	23
10	(United Kingdom) / (Austria) **Red Bull Racing**	22

Notes

- Source unites Lotus, Team Lotus and Lotus F1 statistics.
- Source separates Sauber, BMW Sauber and Kick Sauber statistics.
- Source separates Arrows and Footwork Arrows statistics.

=== Most championship points in a season ===
	Constructor	Points	Season	WCC	Races	Average
1	(Austria) **Red Bull Racing**	860	2023	1st	22	39.09
2	(United Kingdom) **McLaren**	833	2025	1st	24	34.71
3	(Germany) **Mercedes**	765	2016	1st	21	36.42
4	(Austria) **Red Bull Racing**	759	2022	1st	22	34.50
5	(Germany) **Mercedes**	739	2019	1st	21	35.19
6	(Germany) **Mercedes**	703	2015	1st	19	37.00
7	(Germany) **Mercedes**	701	2014	1st	19	36.89
8	(Germany) **Mercedes**	668	2017	1st	20	33.40
9	(United Kingdom) **McLaren**	666	2024	1st	24	27.75
10	(Germany) **Mercedes**	666*	2026	1st	21*	31.71*

Notes

- * Season still in progress.

=== Most consecutive points finishes ===
	Driver	Points finishes	Races
1	(Italy) **Ferrari**	81	2010 German Grand Prix – 2014 Singapore Grand Prix
2	(Austria) **Red Bull Racing**	77	2022 Saudi Arabian Grand Prix – 2025 Canadian Grand Prix
3	(United Kingdom) **McLaren**	64	2010 Bahrain Grand Prix – 2013 Monaco Grand Prix
4	(Germany) **Mercedes**	62	2012 Brazilian Grand Prix – 2016 Russian Grand Prix
4	(Germany) **Mercedes**	62	2021 French Grand Prix – 2024 Saudi Arabian Grand Prix
6	(United Kingdom) **McLaren**	59	2023 Austrian Grand Prix – 2025 São Paulo Grand Prix
7	(Italy) **Ferrari**	55	1999 Malaysian Grand Prix – 2003 Malaysian Grand Prix
7	(Germany) **Mercedes**	55	2018 British Grand Prix – 2021 Monaco Grand Prix
9	(Italy) **Ferrari**	46	2006 San Marino Grand Prix – 2008 Italian Grand Prix
9	(Italy) **Ferrari**	46	2017 Malaysian Grand Prix – 2019 United States Grand Prix

=== Most consecutive seasons with points finishes ===
	Constructor	Seasons	Number of seasons
1	(Italy) **Ferrari**	1958–2026 (ongoing)	69
2	(United Kingdom) **Williams**	1978–2019	42
3	(United Kingdom) **McLaren**	1966–2006	41
4	(United Kingdom) Lotus	1958–1993	36
5	(United Kingdom) Brabham	1962–1987	26
6	(United Kingdom) / (Austria) **Red Bull Racing**	2005–2026 (ongoing)	22
7	(United Kingdom) **McLaren**	2008–2026 (ongoing)	19
8	(United Kingdom) BRM	1958–1974	17
8	(Germany) **Mercedes**	2010–2026 (ongoing)	17
10	(United Kingdom) / (Italy) Benetton	1986–2001	16

=== Most points without a World Constructors Championship ===
	Constructor	Points	Best WCC finish
1	Force India	987	4th in 2016 and 2017
2	(Switzerland) / (Germany) Sauber/BMW Sauber	939	2nd in 2007
3	(United Kingdom) Lotus F1	706	4th in 2012 and 2013
4	(France) **Alpine**	622	4th in 2022
5	(United Kingdom) **Aston Martin**	602	5th in 2023 and 2024
6	(Italy) Toro Rosso	500	6th in 2008 and 2019
7	(United States) **Haas**	417	5th in 2018
8	(France) Ligier/Talbot Ligier	388	2nd in 1980
9	(Italy) AlphaTauri	309	6th in 2021
10	(Republic of Ireland) Jordan	291	3rd in 1999

Notes

- Source unites Force India and Racing Point Force India statistics.
- Source unites Lotus, Team Lotus and Lotus F1 statistics.
- Source separates **Racing Bulls** and **RB** statistics.
- Source separates Sauber, BMW Sauber and Kick Sauber statistics.

=== Most points without a win ===
	Constructor	Points	Best finish
1	Force India	987	2nd place
2	(United Kingdom) **Aston Martin**	602	2nd place
3	(United States) **Haas**	417	4th place
4	(Japan) Toyota	278.5	2nd place
5	(Italy) **Racing Bulls**	252	3rd place
6	(United Kingdom) BAR	227	2nd place
7	(United Kingdom) Arrows	167	2nd place
8	(United Kingdom) Surtees	53	2nd place
9	(United Kingdom) Racing Point Force India	52	5th place
10	(United Kingdom) Jaguar	49	3rd place

Notes

- Source unites Force India and Racing Point Force India statistics.
- Source unites Aston Martin and Aston Martin Aramco statistics. The Aston Martin factory team competed as Aston Martin in 1959, 1960, and 2021, and is competing as Aston Martin Aramco from 2022 onwards.
- Source separates Arrows and Footwork Arrows statistics.
- Source separates **Racing Bulls** and **RB** statistics.
- Source separates Sauber, BMW Sauber and Kick Sauber statistics. Therefore, it has achieved its only win as BMW Sauber.

== Race leaders ==
=== Led for at least one lap, total races ===
	Constructor	Entries	Races led	Percentage
1	(Italy) **Ferrari**	1145	518	45.24%
2	(United Kingdom) **McLaren**	1019	375	36.80%
3	(United Kingdom) **Williams**	872	226	25.92%
4	(United Kingdom) / (Austria) **Red Bull Racing**	439	212	48.29%
5	(Germany) **Mercedes**	362	209	57.73%
6	(United Kingdom) Lotus	491	146	29.74%
7	(United Kingdom) Brabham	403	91	22.58%
8	(France) Renault	403	88	21.84%
9	(United Kingdom) / (Italy) Benetton	260	55	21.15%
10	(United Kingdom) BRM	197	40	20.30%

Notes

- Source unites Lotus, Team Lotus and Lotus F1 statistics.

=== Total laps led ===
	Constructor	Laps
1	(Italy) **Ferrari**	16243
2	(United Kingdom) **McLaren**	12105
3	(Germany) **Mercedes**	8142
4	(United Kingdom) / (Austria) **Red Bull Racing**	7697
5	(United Kingdom) **Williams**	7585
6	(United Kingdom) Lotus	5499
7	(United Kingdom) Brabham	2719
8	(France) Renault	2514
9	(United Kingdom) / (Italy) Benetton	1544
10	(United Kingdom) Tyrrell	1493

Notes

- Source unites Lotus, Team Lotus and Lotus F1 statistics.

=== Total distance led ===
	Constructor	Distance (km)
1	(Italy) **Ferrari**	84179
2	(United Kingdom) **McLaren**	57965
3	(Germany) **Mercedes**	42368
4	(United Kingdom) / (Austria) **Red Bull Racing**	38749
5	(United Kingdom) **Williams**	35246
6	(United Kingdom) Lotus	26179
7	(United Kingdom) Brabham	13226
8	(France) Renault	12146
9	(United Kingdom) / (Italy) Benetton	7338
10	(United Kingdom) Tyrrell	6737

Notes

- Source unites Lotus, Team Lotus and Lotus F1 statistics.

=== Most seasons with a race led ===
	Constructor	Seasons with a race lead
1	(Italy) **Ferrari**	74
2	(United Kingdom) **McLaren**	51
3	(United Kingdom) **Williams**	31
4	(United Kingdom) Lotus	23
5	(United Kingdom) / (Austria) **Red Bull Racing**	21
6	(Germany) **Mercedes**	19
7	(United Kingdom) Brabham	17
8	(United Kingdom) BRM	15
9	(United Kingdom) / (Italy) Benetton	13
9	(France) Renault	13

Notes

- Source unites Lotus, Team Lotus and Lotus F1 statistics.

=== Most consecutive races led for at least one lap ===
	Constructor	Races led	Races
1	(Germany) **Mercedes**	39	2018 Brazilian Grand Prix – 2020 Sakhir Grand Prix
2	(United Kingdom) **Williams**	31	1995 French Grand Prix – 1997 San Marino Grand Prix
3	(United Kingdom) **McLaren**	28	1988 Brazilian Grand Prix – 1989 Italian Grand Prix
3	(Germany) **Mercedes**	28	2014 Australian Grand Prix – 2015 British Grand Prix
5	(United Kingdom) **Williams**	26	1986 Belgian Grand Prix – 1987 Mexican Grand Prix
5	(United Kingdom) **Williams**	26	1992 French Grand Prix – 1994 Brazilian Grand Prix
7	(Austria) **Red Bull Racing**	24	2010 Japanese Grand Prix – 2012 Australian Grand Prix
8	(Italy) **Ferrari**	22	2003 Italian Grand Prix – 2005 Australian Grand Prix
9	(Germany) **Mercedes**	21	2016 Monaco Grand Prix – 2017 Spanish Grand Prix
10	(Italy) **Ferrari**	18	2002 Canadian Grand Prix – 2003 Canadian Grand Prix

=== Most consecutive laps in the lead ===
	Constructor	Laps led	Races
1	(United Kingdom) **McLaren**	477	1988 Brazilian Grand Prix – 1988 French Grand Prix
2	(United Kingdom) **Williams**	419	1993 Canadian Grand Prix – 1993 Italian Grand Prix
3	(Germany) **Mercedes**	413	2014 Australian Grand Prix – 2014 Canadian Grand Prix
4	(United Kingdom) **Williams**	407	1992 South African Grand Prix – 1992 Monaco Grand Prix
5	(Austria) **Red Bull Racing**	344	2023 Azerbaijan Grand Prix – 2023 Austrian Grand Prix
6	(Italy) **Ferrari**	340	1975 Italian Grand Prix – 1976 Spanish Grand Prix
7	(Italy) **Ferrari**	305	1952 Belgian Grand Prix – 1952 Dutch Grand Prix
8	(Germany) **Mercedes**	284	2016 British Grand Prix – 2016 Singapore Grand Prix
9	(United Kingdom) **McLaren**	282	1989 San Marino Grand Prix – 1989 Canadian Grand Prix
10	(Germany) **Mercedes**	276	1955 Belgian Grand Prix – 1955 Italian Grand Prix

=== Most consecutive distance led ===
	Constructor	Distance (km)	Races
1	(United Kingdom) **Williams**	2146	1993 Canadian Grand Prix – 1993 Italian Grand Prix
2	(Italy) **Ferrari**	2075	1952 Belgian Grand Prix – 1952 Dutch Grand Prix
3	(United Kingdom) **McLaren**	2021	1988 Brazilian Grand Prix – 1988 French Grand Prix
4	(Germany) **Mercedes**	1979	2014 Australian Grand Prix – 2014 Canadian Grand Prix
5	(Germany) **Mercedes**	1862	1955 Belgian Grand Prix – 1955 Italian Grand Prix
6	(United Kingdom) **Williams**	1763	1992 South African Grand Prix – 1992 Monaco Grand Prix
7	(Italy) **Ferrari**	1625	1975 Italian Grand Prix – 1976 Spanish Grand Prix
8	(Austria) **Red Bull Racing**	1579	2023 Azerbaijan Grand Prix – 2023 Austrian Grand Prix
9	(Germany) **Mercedes**	1509	2016 British Grand Prix – 2016 Singapore Grand Prix
10	(Italy) **Ferrari**	1470	1953 French Grand Prix – 1953 Italian Grand Prix

=== Most consecutive seasons leading a race ===
	Constructor	Seasons	Number of seasons
1	(United Kingdom) **McLaren**	1981–2014	34
2	(Italy) **Ferrari**	1993–2019	27
3	(Italy) **Ferrari**	1950–1972	23
4	(Austria) **Red Bull Racing**	2007–2026 (ongoing)	20
5	(Italy) **Ferrari**	1974–1991	18
6	(Germany) **Mercedes**	2010–2026 (ongoing)	17
7	(United Kingdom) Lotus	1960–1970	11
7	(United Kingdom) **McLaren**	1968–1978	11
7	(United Kingdom) / (Italy) Benetton	1989–1999	11
10	(United Kingdom) **Williams**	1979–1987	9
10	(United Kingdom) **Williams**	1989–1997	9

Notes

- Source includes Kurtis Kraft in the top 10, but the Indianapolis 500 did not count towards the International Cup for F1 Manufacturers.

=== Most races led in a season ===
	Constructor	Season	Total races	Races led	Percentage
1	(Germany) **Mercedes**	2019	21	21	100.00%
1	(Austria) **Red Bull Racing**	2023	22	21	95.45%
3	(Germany) **Mercedes**	2016	21	20	95.24%
3	(Germany) **Mercedes**	2026	21*	20	95.24%*
4	(Austria) **Red Bull Racing**	2011	19	19	100.00%
4	(Austria) **Red Bull Racing**	2022	22	19	86.36%
4	(Germany) **Mercedes**	2014	19	19	100.00%
4	(United Kingdom) **McLaren**	2025	24	19	79.17%
9	(Italy) **Ferrari**	2004	18	18	100.00%
9	(Austria) **Red Bull Racing**	2013	19	18	94.74%
9	(Austria) **Red Bull Racing**	2021	22	18	81.82%

* Season still in progress.

=== Most laps led in a season ===
	Constructor	Season	Total laps	Laps led	Percentage
1	(Austria) **Red Bull Racing**	2023	1325	1149	86.72%
2	(Germany) **Mercedes**	2016	1268	1055	83.20%
3	(United Kingdom) **McLaren**	1988	1031	1003	97.28%
4	(Germany) **Mercedes**	2014	1134	978	86.24%
5	(Germany) **Mercedes**	2015	1149	936	81.46%
6	(United Kingdom) **Williams**	1992	1036	867	83.69%
7	(Italy) **Ferrari**	2002	1090	865	79.36%
8	(Germany) **Mercedes**	2020	1037	860	82.93%
9	(United Kingdom) **McLaren**	2025	1444	825	57.13%
10	(Austria) **Red Bull Racing**	2011	1133	798	70.43%

=== Most distance led in a season ===
	Constructor	Season	Total distance (km)	Distance led (km)	Percentage
1	(Austria) **Red Bull Racing**	2023	6697	5780	86.31%
2	(Germany) **Mercedes**	2016	6397	5389	84.24%
3	(Germany) **Mercedes**	2014	5717	4922	86.09%
4	(Germany) **Mercedes**	2015	5778	4704	81.41%
5	(United Kingdom) **McLaren**	1988	4747	4622	97.37%
6	(Germany) **Mercedes**	2020	5229	4291	82.06%
7	(Italy) **Ferrari**	2002	5176	4210	81.34%
8	(United Kingdom) **Williams**	1992	4849	4098	84.51%
9	(Austria) **Red Bull Racing**	2011	5794	4064	70.14%
10	(United Kingdom) **McLaren**	2025	7313	4060	55.52%

=== Highest percentage of races led in a season ===
	Constructor	Season	Total races	Races led	Percentage
1	(United Kingdom) **Williams**	1993	16	16	100%
1	(United Kingdom) **Williams**	1996	16	16	100%
1	(United Kingdom) **McLaren**	1988	16	16	100%
1	(Italy) **Ferrari**	2004	18	18	100%
1	(Austria) **Red Bull Racing**	2011	19	19	100%
1	(Germany) **Mercedes**	2014	19	19	100%
1	(Germany) **Mercedes**	2019	21	21	100%
8	(Austria) **Red Bull Racing**	2023	22	21	95.45%
9	(Germany) **Mercedes**	2016	21	20	95.24%
10	(Germany) **Mercedes**	2026	21*	20	95.24%*

* Season still in progress.

=== Highest percentage of laps led in a season ===
	Constructor	Season	Total laps	Laps led	Percentage
1	(United Kingdom) **McLaren**	1988	1031	1003	97.28%
2	(Austria) **Red Bull Racing**	2023	1325	1149	86.72%
3	(Germany) **Mercedes**	2014	1134	978	86.24%
4	(United Kingdom) **Williams**	1992	1036	867	83.69%
5	(Germany) **Mercedes**	2016	1268	1055	83.20%
6	(Germany) **Mercedes**	2020	1037	860	82.93%
7	(Germany) **Mercedes**	2015	1149	936	81.46%
8	(Italy) **Ferrari**	2002	1090	865	79.36%
9	(United Kingdom) **Williams**	1996	1014	765	75.44%
10	(United Kingdom) **McLaren**	1989	1039	745	71.70%

=== Highest percentage of distance led in a season ===
	Constructor	Season	Total distance (km)	Distance led (km)	Percentage
1	(United Kingdom) **McLaren**	1988	4747	4622	97.37%
2	(Austria) **Red Bull Racing**	2023	6697	5780	86.31%
3	(Germany) **Mercedes**	2014	5717	4922	86.09%
4	(United Kingdom) **Williams**	1992	4849	4098	84.51%
5	(Germany) **Mercedes**	2016	6397	5389	84.24%
6	(Germany) **Mercedes**	2020	5229	4291	82.06%
7	(Germany) **Mercedes**	2015	5778	4704	81.41%
8	(Italy) **Ferrari**	2002	5176	4210	81.34%
9	(Italy) Alfa Romeo	1950	3003	2364	78.72%
10	(United Kingdom) **McLaren**	1989	4775	3515	73.61%

== Multiple achievements at the same race ==
=== Wins from pole position ===
This is sometimes referred to as a "double".

	Constructor	Races
1	(Italy) **Ferrari**	137
2	(Germany) **Mercedes**	118
3	(United Kingdom) **McLaren**	106
4	(Austria) **Red Bull Racing**	83
5	(United Kingdom) **Williams**	70
6	(United Kingdom) Lotus	47
7	(France) Renault	24
8	(United Kingdom) Brabham	11
9	(United Kingdom) Cooper	10
9	(United Kingdom) Tyrrell	10

Notes

- Source unites Lotus, Team Lotus and Lotus F1 statistics.

=== Pole, win, and fastest lap in same race ===
This is sometimes referred to as a "hat-trick" or "hat trick".

	Constructor	Races
1	(Italy) **Ferrari**	90
2	(Germany) **Mercedes**	63
3	(United Kingdom) **McLaren**	59
4	(United Kingdom) **Williams**	52
5	(Austria) **Red Bull Racing**	42
6	(United Kingdom) Lotus	26
7	(France) Renault	11
8	(Italy) / (Switzerland) Alfa Romeo	9
8	(United Kingdom) Brabham	9
10	(United Kingdom) Cooper	7

Notes

- Source unites Lotus, Team Lotus and Lotus F1 statistics.

=== Pole, win, fastest lap, and led every lap ===
This is sometimes referred to as a Grand Slam or a grand chelem.

	Constructor	Races
1	(Italy) **Ferrari**	42
2	(Germany) **Mercedes**	36
3	(United Kingdom) **McLaren**	34
4	(United Kingdom) **Williams**	32
5	(Austria) **Red Bull Racing**	20
6	(United Kingdom) Lotus	16
7	(United Kingdom) Brabham	6
8	(Italy) / (Switzerland) Alfa Romeo	5
8	(United Kingdom) Tyrrell	5
10	(United Kingdom) Cooper	4

Notes

- Source unites Lotus, Team Lotus and Lotus F1 statistics.

== Championships ==
=== Total World Constructors' Championships ===
	Constructor	WCC	Seasons
1	(Italy) **Ferrari**	16	1961, 1964, 1975, 1976, 1977, 1979, 1982, 1983, 1999, 2000, 2001, 2002, 2003, 2004, 2007, 2008
2	(United Kingdom) **McLaren**	10	1974, 1984, 1985, 1988, 1989, 1990, 1991, 1998, 2024, 2025
3	(United Kingdom) **Williams**	9	1980, 1981, 1986, 1987, 1992, 1993, 1994, 1996, 1997
3	(Germany) **Mercedes**	9	2014, 2015, 2016, 2017, 2018, 2019, 2020, 2021, 2026
5	(United Kingdom) Lotus	7	1963, 1965, 1968, 1970, 1972, 1973, 1978
6	(Austria) **Red Bull Racing**	6	2010, 2011, 2012, 2013, 2022, 2023
7	(United Kingdom) Cooper	2	1959, 1960
7	(United Kingdom) Brabham	2	1966, 1967
7	(France) Renault	2	2005, 2006
10	(United Kingdom) Vanwall	1	1958
10	(United Kingdom) BRM	1	1962
10	(France) Matra	1	1969
10	(United Kingdom) Tyrrell	1	1971
10	(United Kingdom) Benetton	1	1995
10	(United Kingdom) Brawn	1	2009

=== Total World Drivers' Championships ===
	Constructor	WDC	Seasons
1	(Italy) **Ferrari**	15	1952, 1953, 1956, 1958, 1961, 1964, 1975, 1977, 1979, 2000, 2001, 2002, 2003, 2004, 2007
2	(United Kingdom) **McLaren**	13	1974, 1976, 1984, 1985, 1986, 1988, 1989, 1990, 1991, 1998, 1999, 2008, 2025
3	(Germany) **Mercedes**	10	1954 (Note: Fangio competed in the 1954 Argentine and Belgian Grands Prix with Maserati, then completed the season with Mercedes. This shared championship is counted for each of these constructors.), 1955, 2014, 2015, 2016, 2017, 2018, 2019, 2020, 2026
4	(Austria) **Red Bull Racing**	8	2010, 2011, 2012, 2013, 2021, 2022, 2023, 2024
5	(United Kingdom) **Williams**	7	1980, 1982, 1987, 1992, 1993, 1996, 1997
6	(United Kingdom) Lotus	6	1963, 1965, 1968, 1970, 1972, 1978
7	(United Kingdom) Brabham	4	1966, 1967, 1981, 1983
8	(Italy) Alfa Romeo	2	1950, 1951
8	(Italy) Maserati	2	1954, 1957
8	(United Kingdom) Cooper	2	1959, 1960
8	(United Kingdom) Tyrrell	2	1971, 1973
8	(United Kingdom) Benetton	2	1994, 1995
8	(France) Renault	2	2005, 2006

=== Most consecutive World Constructors' Championships ===
	Constructor	Titles	Seasons
1	(Germany) **Mercedes**	8	2014, 2015, 2016, 2017, 2018, 2019, 2020, 2021
2	(Italy) **Ferrari**	6	1999, 2000, 2001, 2002, 2003, 2004
3	(United Kingdom) **McLaren**	4	1988, 1989, 1990, 1991
3	(Austria) **Red Bull Racing**	4	2010, 2011, 2012, 2013
4	(Italy) **Ferrari**	3	1975, 1976, 1977
4	(United Kingdom) **Williams**	3	1992, 1993, 1994
7	(United Kingdom) Cooper	2	1959, 1960
7	(United Kingdom) Brabham	2	1966, 1967
7	(United Kingdom) Team Lotus	2	1972, 1973
7	(United Kingdom) **Williams**	2	1980, 1981
7	(United Kingdom) **Williams**	2	1986, 1987
7	(United Kingdom) **Williams**	2	1996, 1997
7	(Italy) **Ferrari**	2	1982, 1983
7	(Italy) **Ferrari**	2	2007, 2008
7	(United Kingdom) **McLaren**	2	1984, 1985
7	(United Kingdom) **McLaren**	2	2024, 2025
7	(France) Renault	2	2005, 2006
7	(Austria) **Red Bull Racing**	2	2022, 2023

=== Largest gap between World Constructors' Championships ===
	Constructor	Seasons	Years	
1	(United Kingdom) **McLaren**	26	1998	2024
2	(Italy) **Ferrari**	16	1983	1999
3	(Italy) **Ferrari**	11	1964	1975
4	(United Kingdom) **McLaren**	10	1974	1984
5	(Austria) **Red Bull Racing**	9	2013	2022
6	(United Kingdom) **McLaren**	7	1991	1998
7	(United Kingdom) Lotus	5	1973	1978
7	(United Kingdom) **Williams**	5	1981	1986
7	(United Kingdom) **Williams**	5	1987	1992
7	(Germany) **Mercedes**	5	2021	2026

== Sprints ==
Sprint races were introduced in 2021 as addition to select races; since 2022 the top eight finishers score points.

=== Most sprint wins ===
	Constructor	Starts	Wins	Percentage
1	(Austria) **Red Bull Racing**	30	15	50.00%
2	(United Kingdom) **McLaren**	30	7	23.33%
2	(Germany) **Mercedes**	30	7	23.33%
4	(Italy) **Ferrari**	30	1	3.33%

=== Most sprint pole positions ===
	Constructor	Entries	Poles	Percentage
1	(Austria) **Red Bull Racing**	30	11	36.67%
2	(United Kingdom) **McLaren**	30	9	30.00%
3	(Germany) **Mercedes**	30	6	20.00%
4	(Italy) **Ferrari**	30	3	10.00%
5	(United States) **Haas**	30	1	3.33%

=== Most sprint fastest laps ===
	Constructor	Starts	Fastest laps	Percentage
1	(Austria) **Red Bull Racing**	30	12	40.00%
2	(Italy) **Ferrari**	30	6	20.00%
3	(Germany) **Mercedes**	30	5	16.67%
3	(United Kingdom) **McLaren**	30	5	16.67%
5	(United States) **Haas**	30	1	3.33%
5	(France) **Alpine**	30	1	3.33%

=== Most sprint podium finishes ===
	Constructor	Podium finishes	Podium races
1	(Austria) **Red Bull Racing**	25	19
1	(United Kingdom) **McLaren**	25	17
3	(Italy) **Ferrari**	20	16
4	(Germany) **Mercedes**	18	14
5	(France) **Alpine**	1	1
5	(United Kingdom) **Williams**	1	1

=== Most points scored in sprints ===
	Constructor	Starts	Points	Average
1	(Italy) **Ferrari**	30	235	7.83
2	(Austria) **Red Bull Racing**	30	225	7.5
3	(United Kingdom) **McLaren**	30	215	7.17
4	(Germany) **Mercedes**	30	209	6.97
5	(United States) **Haas**	30	24	0.8
6	(United Kingdom) **Aston Martin**	30	23	0.77
7	(France) **Alpine**	30	19	0.63
8	(United Kingdom) **Williams**	30	15	0.5
9	(Italy) **Racing Bulls**	18	18	1
10	(Italy) AlphaTauri	12	3	0.25

Notes

- Source separates **Racing Bulls** and **RB** statistics.

=== Total sprint laps led ===
	Constructor	Laps
1	(Austria) **Red Bull Racing**	263
2	(Germany) **Mercedes**	145
3	(United Kingdom) **McLaren**	136
4	(Italy) **Ferrari**	54
5	(United States) **Haas**	2

=== Total sprint distance led ===
	Constructor	Distance (km)
1	(Austria) **Red Bull Racing**	1350
2	(Germany) **Mercedes**	706
3	(United Kingdom) **McLaren**	689
4	(Italy) **Ferrari**	290
5	(United States) **Haas**	9

== Other constructor records ==
=== Race starts and entries, other ===
Description	Record	Details	Ref
Longest time between successive starts	60 years, 256 days	(United Kingdom) **Aston Martin** (1960 British Grand Prix – 2021 Bahrain Grand Prix)	
Most races between successive starts	945	(United Kingdom) **Aston Martin** (1960 British Grand Prix – 2021 Bahrain Grand Prix)	
Most seasons with a start	77	(Italy) **Ferrari** (1950–2026)	
Most consecutive race starts	799	(Italy) **Ferrari** (1982 Italian Grand Prix – 2026 Las Vegas Grand Prix) (ongoing)	
Most entries with the same engine	1145	(Italy) **Ferrari**	

=== Wins, other ===
Description	Record	Details	Ref
Wins at most different Grands Prix	37	(Germany) **Mercedes**	
Wins at most different circuits	51	(United Kingdom) **McLaren**	
Most wins at the same circuit	20	(Italy) **Ferrari** (Monza)	
Longest time between first and last wins	74 years, 356 days	(Italy) **Ferrari** (1951 British Grand Prix – 2026 British Grand Prix)	
Longest time between successive wins	56 years, 217 days	(Germany) **Mercedes** (1955 Italian Grand Prix – 2012 Chinese Grand Prix)	
Most races between successive wins	813	(Germany) **Mercedes** (1955 Italian Grand Prix – 2012 Chinese Grand Prix)	
Most consecutive wins at the same Grand Prix	8 (2014 - 2021)	(Germany) **Mercedes** (Russian Grand Prix) (ongoing)	
Most different constructor winners in a season	7 (1982)	(France) Renault – 4 wins (United Kingdom) **McLaren** – 4 wins (Italy) **Ferrari** – 3 wins (United Kingdom) Brabham – 2 wins (United Kingdom) Lotus – 1 win (United Kingdom) **Williams** – 1 win (United Kingdom) Tyrrell – 1 win	
Most different race winners in consecutive races	7 (1982 - 1983)	(Italy) **Ferrari** (1982 German Grand Prix) (United Kingdom) Lotus (1982 Austrian Grand Prix) (United Kingdom) **Williams** (1982 Swiss Grand Prix) (France) Renault (1982 Italian Grand Prix) (United Kingdom) Tyrrell (1982 Caesars Palace Grand Prix) (United Kingdom) Brabham (1983 Brazilian Grand Prix) (United Kingdom) **McLaren** (1983 United States Grand Prix West)	
Fewest wins in a World Championship-winning season	3	(Italy) **Ferrari** (1964, 1982)	

=== Pole positions, other ===
Description	Record	Details	Ref
Pole positions at most different Grands Prix	39	(Germany) **Mercedes**	
Pole positions at most different circuits	53	(Italy) **Ferrari**	
Most pole positions at the same circuit	23	(Italy) **Ferrari** (Monza)	
Longest time between first and last pole positions	75 years, 110 days	(Italy) **Ferrari** (1951 British Grand Prix – 2026 Mexico City Grand Prix)	
Longest time between successive pole positions	56 years, 217 days	(Germany) **Mercedes** (1955 Italian Grand Prix – 2012 Chinese Grand Prix)	
Most races between successive pole positions	813	(Germany) **Mercedes** (1955 Italian Grand Prix – 2012 Chinese Grand Prix)	
Most consecutive pole positions at the same Grand Prix	9 (2013 - 2021)	(Germany) **Mercedes** (Spanish Grand Prix)	

=== Fastest laps, other ===
Description	Record	Details	Ref
Fastest laps at most different Grands Prix	40	(United Kingdom) **McLaren**	
Fastest laps at most different circuits	54	(Italy) **Ferrari**	
Most fastest laps at the same circuit	19	(Italy) **Ferrari** (Monza, Silverstone)	
Longest time between first and last fastest laps	74 years, 167 days	(Italy) **Ferrari** (1952 Swiss Grand Prix – 2026 Mexico City Grand Prix)	
Longest time between successive fastest laps	56 years, 287 days	(Germany) **Mercedes** (1955 Italian Grand Prix – 2012 European Grand Prix)	
Most races between successive fastest laps	818	(Germany) **Mercedes** (1955 Italian Grand Prix – 2012 European Grand Prix)	

=== Podium finishes, other ===
Description	Record	Details	Ref
Podiums at most different Grands Prix	45	(Italy) **Ferrari**	
Podiums at most different circuits	70	(Italy) **Ferrari**	
Longest time between first and last podiums	76 years, 164 days	(Italy) **Ferrari** (1950 Monaco Grand Prix – 2026 Mexico City Grand Prix)	
Longest time between successive podiums	54 years, 206 days	(Germany) **Mercedes** (1955 Italian Grand Prix – 2010 Malaysian Grand Prix)	
Most races between successive podiums	775	(Germany) **Mercedes** (1955 Italian Grand Prix – 2010 Malaysian Grand Prix)	
Most second places	300	(Italy) **Ferrari**	
Most third places	299	(Italy) **Ferrari**	
Most second and third places	599	(Italy) **Ferrari**	

=== Points, other ===
Description	Record	Details	Ref
Longest time between successive points finishes	37 years, 129 days	(Japan) Honda (1968 Mexican Grand Prix – 2006 Bahrain Grand Prix)	
Most races between successive points finishes	595	(Italy) Alfa Romeo (1984 European Grand Prix – 2019 Australian Grand Prix)	

=== Championships, other ===
Description	Record	Details	Ref
Most races left in a season when becoming World Constructors' Champions	6	(Austria) **Red Bull Racing** (2023) (United Kingdom) **McLaren** (2025)	
Most races as World Constructors' Championship leader	240	(Italy) **Ferrari**	
Most consecutive races as World Constructors' Championship leader	58	(Germany) **Mercedes** (2014 Malaysian Grand Prix – 2017 Australian Grand Prix)	
Most consecutive days as World Constructors' Championship leader	1092	(Germany) **Mercedes** (2014 Malaysian Grand Prix – 2017 Australian Grand Prix)	
Most points between first and second in the World Constructors' Championship	451 (2023)	(Austria) **Red Bull Racing** (860 pts.) and (Germany) **Mercedes** (409 pts.)	
Fewest points between first and second in the World Constructors' Championship	3 (1964)	(Italy) **Ferrari** (45 pts.) and (United Kingdom) BRM (42 pts.)	
Longest time between successive World Drivers' Championships	21 years, 29 days	(Italy) **Ferrari** (1979 and 2000)	
Most World Constructors' Championship runners-up	21	(Italy) **Ferrari** (1958, 1959, 1966, 1970, 1974, 1978, 1984, 1985, 1988, 1990, 1996, 1997, 1998, 2006, 2012, 2015, 2017, 2018, 2019, 2022, 2024)	

=== Sprints, other ===
Description	Record	Details	Ref
Most sprint wins in a season	5	(Austria) **Red Bull Racing** (2023)	

=== Other ===
Description	Record	Details	Ref
Fastest pit stop	1.80 s	(United Kingdom) **McLaren** for (United Kingdom) Lando Norris ( 2023 Qatar Grand Prix, lap 27)	
Slowest pit stop (Classified as DNF)	43 h 15 min	(Germany) **Mercedes** for (Finland) Valtteri Bottas ( 2021 Monaco Grand Prix, lap 30)	
Slowest pit stop (Finished the race)	72 s	(Italy) **Ferrari** for (Brazil) Rubens Barrichello ( (Malaysia) 2001 Malaysian Grand Prix, lap 4)	
