= Robert O'Brien (racing driver) =

American racing driver (1908–1987)

- Born: April 11, 1908; Lyndhurst, New Jersey
- Died: February 10, 1987 (aged 78); Hackensack, New Jersey

Formula One World Championship career
- Nationality: (United States) American
- Active years: 1952
- Team: privateer Simca-Gordini
- Entries: 1
- Championships: 0
- Wins: 0
- Podiums: 0
- Career points: 0
- Pole positions: 0
- Fastest laps: 0
- First entry: 1952 Belgian Grand Prix

Robert O'Brien (April 11, 1908 – February 10, 1987) was a racing driver from the United States. He participated in one Formula One World Championship Grand Prix, the 1952 Belgian Grand Prix.

== Career ==
O'Brien was born in Lyndhurst, New Jersey. He mostly raced sports cars in the US, finishing fourth in the 1952 12 Hours of Sebring in a Ferrari 166 MM shared with Richard Cicurel.

O'Brien later made a few appearances in Europe through his contacts in Belgium. This included an appearance at the 1952 Belgian Grand Prix driving a Simca-Gordini T15 at Spa-Francorchamps. Qualifying slowest of the 22 entrants, 1 minute 23 seconds slower than the fastest time of Alberto Ascari, O'Brien circulated at the back and finished 14th of the 15 finishers. He subsequently drove (and retired) the same car in a race at the Grenzlandring in Germany before returning to the US.

O'Brien is one of the more obscure drivers to have participated in the Formula One World Championship, and unsubstantiated rumours arose that he was involved with the CIA and operated as a spy. He was later involved in the motor industry in his home state and in New York.

O'Brien died in Hackensack, New Jersey in 1987.

== Complete Formula One World Championship results ==
(key)

Year	Entrant	Chassis	Engine	1	2	3	4	5	6	7	8	WDC	Pts
1952	Robert O'Brien	Simca-Gordini 15	Gordini 1500 1.5 L4	SUI	500	BEL; 14	FRA	GBR	GER	NED	ITA	NC	0
