= Ferrari 166 MM Berlinetta Le Mans =

Racecar

See also the 166 S/MM

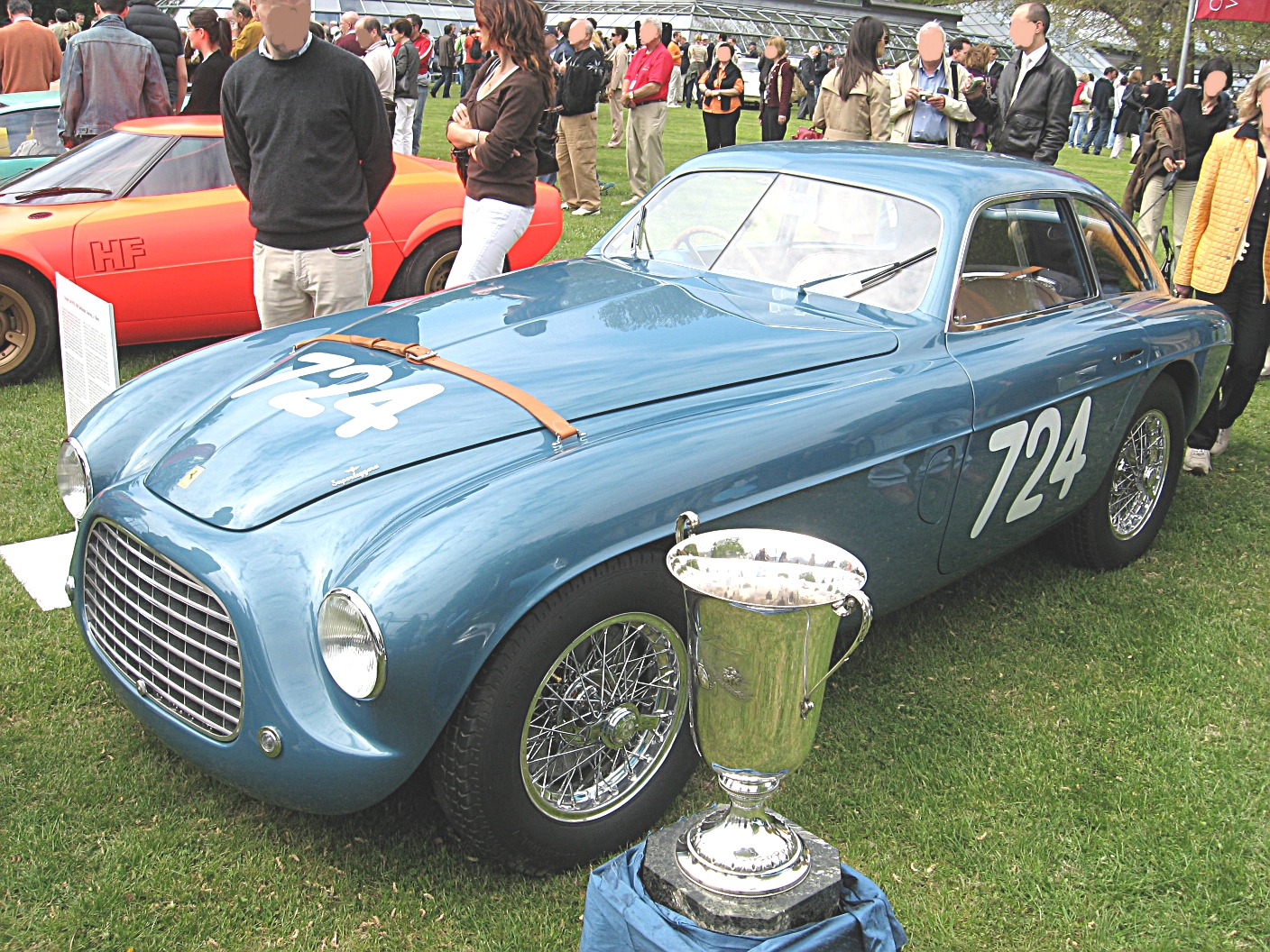
Ferrari 166 MM/195 S Berlinetta Touring

The Ferrari 166 MM Berlinetta Le Mans is a car built by Ferrari in 1950. Only 6 were produced. It was designed primarily for racing, and was an improvement of earlier models of the Ferrari 166, such as the 166 MM Barchetta. This "Berlinetta" design was a little heavier than previous models, but was supposed to perform better in high-speed races such as the Le Mans races. The two cars that were entered in 1950 for the Le Mans did not finish.

== Specs ==
The Ferrari 166MM Berlinetta was fitted the same chassis as the Ferrari 166 Barchettas. The bodies were crafted by Superleggera and were completely aluminum. This design of the chassis was created in 1937 by Anderloni. Small diameter tubing was gas welded to create the steel skeleton, which was later fastened to the car. The front suspension was independent with a transverse leaf spring while the rear suspension had a live axle with leaf springs. Large drum brakes were placed on the wheels to better the stopping power, something that Ferrari would continue for several years. The engine of one example updated to 195 S-spec received a boost from previous models, now producing 170 horsepower instead of 140. The Berlinetta was produced as a 2-door fastback coupe with a spark ignition four-stroke V-12 engine. Just like all the other 166s, the car had a three-carburetor set up. The berlinetta was rear wheel drive. It had a manual 5-speed transmission with a top speed of a 189 km/h, or 117 mph. The 0–60 mph time was 8.5 seconds.

== History ==
Recent 166 Berlinettas that have been either sold at auction or featured in magazines include:

=== Chassis 0066M ===
The Chassis number 0066M is equipped with the engine number 0066M. The car was finished on June 14, 1949. It was purchased by Anteo Allazetta of Trieste straight from the factory. The car originally had a single carburetor, but was later converted to a three-carburetor setup to match the other 166 MM Berlinettas in 1950 so that it could be raced.

Allazetta raced in the Trieste-Opicina Hill climb on June 21, 1953. The car placed 1st in its class and 4th overall. It was then raced on July 12, 1953, in the Coppa d’Oro Dolomiti where the car placed second in its class and 5th overall in the race. In the Trieste-Opicinia Hill climb, the car placed fourth in class and 5th overall. The 166 Berlinetta was then sold in 1958 to David Francis Leopold in the United States. It was then purchased by George Smith of Cincinnati, Ohio, a year later and then sold again in 1961 to Donald Williams. Fred Leydorf then purchased the car and gave it a complete restoration along with an engine rebuild. In 1972, the 166 Berlinetta was sold to John R. Bond of California where it would be featured on the cover of Road & Track in the late 1970s. The car was then imported to Yokohama, Japan, after being bought by Tohru Horinouchi in 1984. Horinouchi also gave the car another complete, four-year, restoration. It was then sold at the Gooding and Company auction in Pebble Beach, California. It sold for $2,200,000 in 2008.

=== Chassis 020I ===
The Chassis Number 020I was constructed by Colombo, Ferrari's chief engineer. It was one of the first vehicles to actually have the name "Ferrari". It was driven by Cortese Franco and was at its best when raced on tracks with many corners. It won its first Gran Prix in Rome, and its second race won in Vercelli. It then was damaged at the Terme di Caracalla and therefore could not race. However it was repaired and was able to race again, but this time Tazio Nuvolariwas behind the wheel. He won at the Forlio Circuit and at the Coppa Luigi Arcangeli in Parma. 020I suffered another accident in testing and was given a new body along with an engine replacement. The car originally had the chassis number "02C", however at some point in time, the "C" was mistaken for an "O" and then an "I" was added, to create the serial number "020I".
