= 1952 Belgian Grand Prix =

← Previous race	Next race →
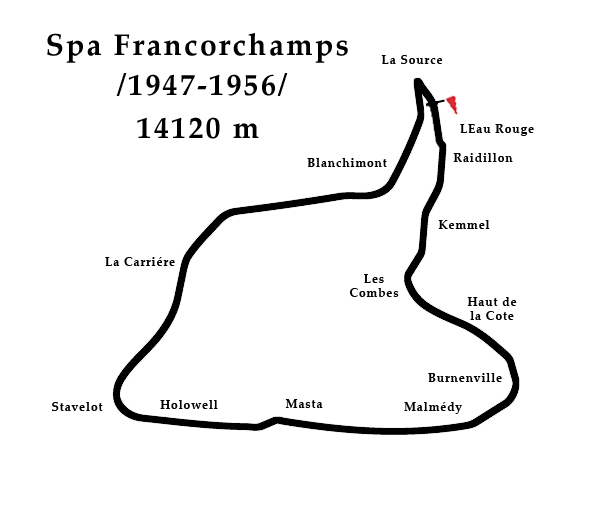

Race details
- Date: 22 June 1952
- Official name: XIV Grand Prix de Belgique
- Location: Spa-Francorchamps, Francorchamps, Belgium
- Course: Grand Prix Circuit
- Course length: 14.12 km (8.774 miles)
- Distance: 36 laps, 508.320 km (315.864 miles)
- Weather: Rain

Pole position
Driver	(Italy) Alberto Ascari	Ferrari
- Time: 4:37.0

Fastest lap
Driver	(Italy) Alberto Ascari	Ferrari
- Time: 4:54.0

Podium
First	(Italy) Alberto Ascari	Ferrari
Second	(Italy) Nino Farina	Ferrari
Third	(France) Robert Manzon	Gordini

The 1952 Belgian Grand Prix was a Formula Two race held on 22 June 1952 at Circuit de Spa-Francorchamps. It was race 3 of 8 in the 1952 World Championship of Drivers, in which each Grand Prix was run to Formula Two rules rather than the Formula One regulations normally used.

== Report ==
Maserati's new A6GCM was still not ready, and, to compound this, their lead driver Juan Manuel Fangio had suffered back injuries at the non-championship Monza Grand Prix. This meant that Ferrari were once again favoured for success in the race, with their driver lineup consisting of Alberto Ascari (in place of André Simon), Nino Farina and Piero Taruffi. There were also two privateer Ferrari entries: local driver Charles de Tornaco of Ecurie Francorchamps, and Louis Rosier. The Gordini team expanded their lineup to include Belgian driver Johnny Claes, alongside Behra, Manzon and Bira. American Robert O'Brien also drove a Simca-Gordini for this race. HWM also recruited a pair of Belgian drivers — Paul Frère and Roger Laurent — who raced alongside regular drivers Peter Collins and Lance Macklin. Stirling Moss switched from HWM to ERA for this race. A handful of other privateer entrants also took part, including future World Champion Mike Hawthorn, who made his debut in a Cooper-Bristol.

Ascari headed an all-Ferrari front row, with teammates Farina and Taruffi in second and third, respectively. The Gordinis of Manzon and Behra made up row two, while the third row consisted of Hawthorn, Ken Wharton (in a Frazer-Nash), and Frère, who was the highest qualifier of the five Belgian drivers on the grid.

Taruffi started badly in the rain, dropping to ninth by the end of the first lap, while Behra overhauled the two leading Ferraris to take the lead of the race. Moss also started well, before his car broke down halfway through the first lap. Behra's lead was short-lived, as both Ascari and Farina overtook him on the second lap, subsequently holding first and second for the remainder of the race. Behra dropped to fourth when the recovering Taruffi passed him on lap 13. On the following lap Taruffi spun at Malmédy and Behra hit him, causing both to retire. Manzon overtook Hawthorn to assume what was now third place. Despite suffering from fuel leakage problems, Hawthorn was able to maintain fourth place until the end of the race. His fellow debutant Paul Frère also finished in the points, in fifth.

Ascari's win (with fastest lap), and Taruffi's retirement, meant that the two now shared the lead of the Championship, on nine points each. Indianapolis 500 winner Troy Ruttman was in third, while Farina's second-place finish raised him to fourth in the standings, three points adrift of the joint Championship leaders.

== Entries ==
No	Driver	Entrant	Constructor	Chassis	Engine	Tyre
2	(Italy) Nino Farina	Scuderia Ferrari	Ferrari	Ferrari 500	Ferrari Type 500 2.0 L4	P
4	(Italy) Alberto Ascari	Scuderia Ferrari	Ferrari	Ferrari 500	Ferrari Type 500 2.0 L4	P
6	(Italy) Piero Taruffi	Scuderia Ferrari	Ferrari	Ferrari 500	Ferrari Type 500 2.0 L4	P
8	(United Kingdom) Mike Hawthorn	Leslie D. Hawthorn	Cooper-Bristol	Cooper T20	Bristol BS1 2.0 L6	D
10	(United Kingdom) Alan Brown	Ecurie Richmond	Cooper-Bristol	Cooper T20	Bristol BS1 2.0 L6	D
12	(United Kingdom) Eric Brandon	Ecurie Richmond	Cooper-Bristol	Cooper T20	Bristol BS1 2.0 L6	D
14	(France) Robert Manzon	Equipe Gordini	Gordini	Gordini T16	Gordini 20 2.0 L6	E
16	(France) Jean Behra	Equipe Gordini	Gordini	Gordini T16	Gordini 20 2.0 L6	E
18	(Belgium) Johnny Claes	Equipe Gordini	Gordini	Gordini T16	Gordini 20 2.0 L6	E
20	(Thailand) Prince Bira	Equipe Gordini	Simca-Gordini	Simca-Gordini T15	Gordini 1500 1.5 L4	E
22	(France) Louis Rosier	Ecurie Rosier	Ferrari	Ferrari 500	Ferrari Type 500 2.0 L4	D
24	(United Kingdom) Lance Macklin	HW Motors	HWM-Alta	HWM 52	Alta F2 2.0 L4	D
26	(United Kingdom) Peter Collins	HW Motors	HWM-Alta	HWM 52	Alta F2 2.0 L4	D
28	(Belgium) Paul Frère	HW Motors	HWM-Alta	HWM 52	Alta F2 2.0 L4	D
30	(Belgium) Roger Laurent	HW Motors	HWM-Alta	HWM 52	Alta F2 2.0 L4	D
32	(United Kingdom) Stirling Moss	English Racing Automobiles Ltd.	ERA-Bristol	ERA G	Bristol BS1 2.0 L6	D
34	(Belgium) Charles de Tornaco	Ecurie Francorchamps	Ferrari	Ferrari 500	Ferrari Type 500 2.0 L4	E
36	(United Kingdom) Ken Wharton	Scuderia Franera	Frazer Nash-Bristol	Frazer Nash FN48	Bristol BS1 2.0 L6	D
38	(Belgium) Arthur Legat	Arthur Legat	Veritas	Veritas Meteor	Veritas 2.0 L6	E
40	(United Kingdom) Robin Montgomerie-Charrington	Robin Montgomerie-Charrington	Aston Butterworth	Aston NB41	Aston Butterworth F4 2.0 L6	D
42	(Australia) Tony Gaze	Tony Gaze	HWM-Alta	HWM 51	Alta F2 2.0 L4	D
44	(United States) Robert O'Brien	Robert O'Brien	Simca-Gordini	Simca-Gordini T15	Gordini 1500 1.5 L4	E

== Classification ==
=== Qualifying ===
Pos	No	Driver	Constructor	Time	Gap
1	4	(Italy) Alberto Ascari	Ferrari	4:37.0	–
2	2	(Italy) Nino Farina	Ferrari	4:40.0	+ 3.0
3	6	(Italy) Piero Taruffi	Ferrari	4:46.0	+ 9.0
4	14	(France) Robert Manzon	Gordini	4:52.0	+ 15.0
5	16	(France) Jean Behra	Gordini	4:56.0	+ 19.0
6	8	(United Kingdom) Mike Hawthorn	Cooper-Bristol	4:58.0	+ 21.0
7	36	(United Kingdom) Ken Wharton	Frazer Nash-Bristol	5:01.0	+ 24.0
8	28	(Belgium) Paul Frère	HWM-Alta	5:05.0	+ 28.0
9	10	(United Kingdom) Alan Brown	Cooper-Bristol	5:07.0	+ 30.0
10	32	(United Kingdom) Stirling Moss	ERA-Bristol	5:07.6	+ 30.6
11	26	(United Kingdom) Peter Collins	HWM-Alta	5:09.0	+ 32.0
12	12	(United Kingdom) Eric Brandon	Cooper-Bristol	5:11.0	+ 34.0
13	34	(Belgium) Charles de Tornaco	Ferrari	5:14.5	+ 37.5
14	24	(United Kingdom) Lance Macklin	HWM-Alta	5:17.1	+ 40.1
15	40	(United Kingdom) Robin Montgomerie-Charrington	Aston Butterworth	5:19.3	+ 42.3
16	42	(Australia) Tony Gaze	HWM-Alta	5:22.8	+ 45.8
17	22	(France) Louis Rosier	Ferrari	5:25.7	+ 48.7
18	20	(Thailand) Prince Bira	Simca-Gordini-Gordini	5:28.4	+ 51.4
19	18	(Belgium) Johnny Claes	Gordini	5:31.1	+ 54.1
20	30	(Belgium) Roger Laurent	HWM-Alta	5:37.9	+ 60.9
21	38	(Belgium) Arthur Legat	Veritas	5:45.0	+ 68.0
22	44	(United States) Robert O'Brien	Simca-Gordini-Gordini	5:51.0	+ 74.0

=== Race ===
Pos	No	Driver	Constructor	Laps	Time/Retired	Grid	Points
1	4	(Italy) Alberto Ascari	Ferrari	36	3:03:46.3	1	9^{1}
2	2	(Italy) Nino Farina	Ferrari	36	+1:55.2	2	6
3	14	(France) Robert Manzon	Gordini	36	+4:28.4	4	4
4	8	(United Kingdom) Mike Hawthorn	Cooper-Bristol	35	+1 lap	6	3
5	28	(Belgium) Paul Frère	HWM-Alta	34	+2 laps	8	2
6	10	(United Kingdom) Alan Brown	Cooper-Bristol	34	+2 laps	9	
7	34	(Belgium) Charles de Tornaco	Ferrari	33	+3 laps	13	
8	18	(Belgium) Johnny Claes	Gordini	33	+3 laps	19	
9	12	(United Kingdom) Eric Brandon	Cooper-Bristol	33	+3 laps	12	
10	20	(Thailand) Prince Bira	Simca-Gordini-Gordini	32	+4 laps	18	
11	24	(United Kingdom) Lance Macklin	HWM-Alta	32	+4 laps	14	
12	30	(Belgium) Roger Laurent	HWM-Alta	32	+4 laps	20	
13	38	(Belgium) Arthur Legat	Veritas	31	+5 laps	21	
14	44	(United States) Robert O'Brien	Simca-Gordini-Gordini	30	+6 laps	22	
15	42	(Australia) Tony Gaze	HWM-Alta	30	+6 laps	16	
Ret	40	(United Kingdom) Robin Montgomerie-Charrington	Aston Butterworth	17	Engine	15	
Ret	6	(Italy) Piero Taruffi	Ferrari	13	Accident	3	
Ret	16	(France) Jean Behra	Gordini	13	Accident	5	
Ret	36	(United Kingdom) Ken Wharton	Frazer-Nash-Bristol	10	Spun off	7	
Ret	22	(France) Louis Rosier	Ferrari	6	Transmission	17	
Ret	26	(United Kingdom) Peter Collins	HWM-Alta	3	Halfshaft	11	
Ret	32	(United Kingdom) Stirling Moss	ERA-Bristol	0	Engine	10	

Notes

- ^1 – Includes 1 point for fastest lap

== Championship standings after the race ==
Drivers' Championship standings

	Pos	Driver	Points
	1	(Italy) Piero Taruffi	9
41	2	(Italy) Alberto Ascari	9
1	3	(United States) Troy Ruttman	8
26	4	(Italy) Nino Farina	6
2	5	(Switzerland) Rudi Fischer	6

- Note: Only the top five positions are included. Only the best 4 results counted towards the Championship.

Previous race: 1952 Indianapolis 500	FIA Formula One World Championship; 1952 season	Next race: 1952 French Grand Prix
Previous race: 1951 Belgian Grand Prix	Belgian Grand Prix	Next race: 1953 Belgian Grand Prix
Previous race: 1951 French Grand Prix	European Grand Prix (Designated European Grand Prix)	Next race: 1954 German Grand Prix
